= 2023–24 BNXT League =

- League: BNXT League
- Sport: Basketball
- Duration: 22 September 2023–17 February 2024 (National phase); 1 March–3 May 2024 (Cross-border phase); 8 May–12 June 2023 (Playoffs)
- Teams: 20

Regular season
- Season MVP: (United States) Damien Jefferson (Oostende)
- Top scorer: (United States) Tyreke Key (Leuven Bears)

National playoffs
- Belgian champions: Oostende (25th title)
- Belgian runners-up: Antwerp Giants
- Dutch champions: ZZ Leiden (6th title)
- Dutch runners-up: Heroes Den Bosch

Finals
- Champions: Oostende (1st title)
- Runners-up: ZZ Leiden
- Finals MVP: Damien Jefferson (Oostende)

BNXT seasons
- ← 2022–23 2024–25 →

The 2023–24 BNXT League was the third season of the BNXT League, the highest professional basketball league in Belgium and the Netherlands.

== Competition formula ==
| | Teams entering in this round |
|---|---|
| National regular season (20 teams) | 11 Belgian teams; 9 Dutch teams; All teams play each other home and away |
| Elite Gold (10 teams) | Best 5 Dutch teams; Best 5 Belgian teams; Teams play 10 games |
| Elite Silver (10 teams) | Bottom-4 Dutch teams; Bottom-6 Belgian teams; Teams play 12 games |
| National play-offs (8 teams) | All Gold teams from each country go quarterfinals; Best three Silver teams joins the quarter-finals |
| BNXT League play-offs (2 teams) | Belgian and Dutch national champions will compete for the title of BNXT League Champion. |

== Teams ==
=== Arenas and locations ===
Location of teams in the BNXT League

Note: Table lists in alphabetical order.

| Club | Location | Venue | Capacity |
Netherlands
| BAL | Weert | Sporthal Boshoven | 1,000 |
| Den Helder Suns | Den Helder | Sporthal Sportlaan | 1,000 |
| Donar | Groningen | MartiniPlaza | 4,350 |
| Feyenoord | Rotterdam | Topsportcentrum Rotterdam | 2,500 |
| Heroes Den Bosch | 's-Hertogenbosch | Maaspoort | 2,800 |
| Landstede Hammers | Zwolle | Landstede Sportcentrum | 1,200 |
| LWD Basket | Leeuwarden | Kalverdijkje | 1,700 |
| Yoast United | Bemmel | De Kooi | 650 |
| ZZ Leiden | Leiden | Vijf Meihal | 2,000 |
Belgium
| Antwerp Giants | Antwerp | Lotto Arena | 5,218 |
| Brussels Basketball | Brussels | Sports Complex Neder-Over-Heembeek | 1,200 |
| Kangoeroes Mechelen | Mechelen | Winketkaai | 1,500 |
| Kortrijk Spurs | Kortrijk | Sportcampus Lange Munte | 2,400 |
| Leuven Bears | Leuven | Sportoase | 3,400 |
| Liège Basket | Liège | Country Hall | 5,000 |
| Limburg United | Hasselt | Alverberg Sporthal | 1,730 |
| Mons-Hainaut | Mons | Mons Arena | 4,000 |
| Okapi Aalst | Aalst | Okapi Forum | 2,800 |
| Oostende | Ostend | Coretec Dôme | 5,000 |
| Spirou | Charleroi | Spiroudome | 6,200 |

== National Round ==
=== Netherlands ===
==== Standings ====
| Pos | Team | Pld | W | L | PF | PA | PD | Pts | Qualification |
|---|---|---|---|---|---|---|---|---|---|
| 1 | Heroes Den Bosch | 16 | 15 | 1 | 1323 | 1084 | +239 | 31 | Advance to Elite Gold |
| 2 | ZZ Leiden | 16 | 12 | 4 | 1255 | 1131 | +124 | 28 | Advance to Elite Gold |
| 3 | Landstede Hammers | 16 | 11 | 5 | 1236 | 1082 | +154 | 27 | Advance to Elite Gold |
| 4 | Donar | 16 | 8 | 8 | 1133 | 1086 | +47 | 24 | Advance to Elite Gold |
| 5 | BAL | 16 | 8 | 8 | 1131 | 1148 | −17 | 24 | Advance to Elite Gold |
| 6 | Feyenoord | 16 | 6 | 10 | 1163 | 1285 | −122 | 22 | Advance to Elite Silver |
| 7 | LWD Basket | 16 | 4 | 12 | 1210 | 1315 | −105 | 20 | Advance to Elite Silver |
| 8 | Den Helder Suns | 16 | 4 | 12 | 1054 | 1259 | −205 | 20 | Advance to Elite Silver |
| 9 | Yoast United | 16 | 4 | 12 | 1186 | 1301 | −115 | 20 | Advance to Elite Silver |

Source: BNXT League

=== Belgium ===
==== Standings ====
| Pos | Team | Pld | W | L | PF | PA | PD | Pts | Qualification |
|---|---|---|---|---|---|---|---|---|---|
| 1 | Oostende | 20 | 18 | 2 | 1600 | 1414 | +186 | 38 | Advance to Elite Gold |
| 2 | Antwerp Giants | 20 | 16 | 4 | 1655 | 1440 | +215 | 36 | Advance to Elite Gold |
| 3 | Hubo Limburg United | 20 | 14 | 6 | 1555 | 1440 | +115 | 34 | Advance to Elite Gold |
| 4 | Liège Basket | 20 | 12 | 8 | 1572 | 1567 | +5 | 32 | Advance to Elite Gold |
| 5 | Spirou | 20 | 11 | 9 | 1474 | 1504 | −30 | 31 | Advance to Elite Gold |
| 6 | Brussels Basketball | 20 | 10 | 10 | 1562 | 1535 | +27 | 30 | Advance to Elite Silver |
| 7 | Kangoeroes Mechelen | 20 | 8 | 12 | 1506 | 1540 | −34 | 28 | Advance to Elite Silver |
| 8 | Kortrijk Spurs | 20 | 8 | 12 | 1552 | 1623 | −71 | 28 | Advance to Elite Silver |
| 9 | Leuven Bears | 20 | 5 | 15 | 1483 | 1589 | −106 | 25 | Advance to Elite Silver |
| 10 | Mons-Hainaut | 20 | 5 | 15 | 1479 | 1632 | −153 | 25 | Advance to Elite Silver |
| 11 | Okapi Aalst | 20 | 3 | 17 | 1516 | 1670 | −154 | 23 | Advance to Elite Silver |

Source: BNXT League

== International Round ==
=== Elite Gold ===
==== Standings ====
| Pos | Team | Pld | W | L | PF | PA | PD | Pts | Qualification |
|---|---|---|---|---|---|---|---|---|---|
| 1 | (Belgium) Oostende | 10 | 10 | 0 | 2522 | 2108 | +414 | 39 | Advance to National Playoffs Quarterfinals (BE) |
| 2 | (Netherlands) Heroes Den Bosch | 10 | 5 | 5 | 2428 | 2156 | +272 | 34 | Advance to National Playoffs Quarterfinals (NL) |
| 3 | (Belgium) Antwerp Giants | 10 | 6 | 4 | 2479 | 2159 | +320 | 34 | Advance to National Playoffs Quarterfinals (BE) |
| 4 | (Netherlands) ZZ Leiden | 10 | 5 | 5 | 2270 | 2152 | +118 | 33 | Advance to National Playoffs Quarterfinals (NL) |
| 5 | (Belgium) Limburg United | 10 | 6 | 4 | 2327 | 2182 | +145 | 33 | Advance to National Playoffs Quarterfinals (BE) |
| 6 | (Belgium) Spirou | 10 | 7 | 3 | 2236 | 2193 | +43 | 31 | Advance to National Playoffs Quarterfinals (BE) |
| 7 | (Belgium) Liege Basket | 10 | 6 | 4 | 2426 | 2350 | +76 | 31 | Advance to National Playoffs Quarterfinals (BE) |
| 8 | (Netherlands) Landstede Hammers | 10 | 1 | 9 | 2249 | 2164 | +85 | 28 | Advance to National Playoffs Quarterfinals (NL) |
| 9 | (Netherlands) Donar | 10 | 3 | 7 | 2182 | 2214 | −32 | 28 | Advance to National Playoffs Quarterfinals (NL) |
| 10 | (Netherlands) BAL | 10 | 1 | 9 | 2110 | 2324 | −214 | 26 | Advance to National Playoffs Quarterfinals (NL) |

Source: BNXT League

=== Elite Silver ===
==== Standings ====
| Pos | Team | Pld | W | L | PF | PA | PD | Pts | Qualification |
|---|---|---|---|---|---|---|---|---|---|
| 1 | (Belgium) Kangoeroes Mechelen | 12 | 10 | 2 | 2533 | 2446 | +87 | 36 | Advance to National Playoffs Quarterfinals (BE) |
| 2 | (Belgium) Mons-Hainaut | 12 | 11 | 1 | 2533 | 2558 | −25 | 36 | Advance to National Playoffs Quarterfinals (BE) |
| 3 | (Belgium) Leuven Bears | 12 | 10 | 2 | 2457 | 2452 | +5 | 35 | Advance to National Playoffs Quarterfinals (BE) |
| 4 | (Belgium) Phoenix Brussels | 12 | 7 | 5 | 2529 | 2460 | +69 | 34 | |
| 5 | (Belgium) Okapi Aalst | 12 | 8 | 4 | 2486 | 2536 | −50 | 32 | |
| 6 | (Belgium) Kortrijk Spurs | 12 | 4 | 8 | 2573 | 2611 | −38 | 30 | |
| 7 | (Netherlands) LWD Basket | 12 | 4 | 8 | 2464 | 2686 | −222 | 29 | Advance to National Playoffs Quarterfinals (NL) |
| 8 | (Netherlands) Feyenoord | 12 | 2 | 10 | 2390 | 2658 | −268 | 28 | Advance to National Playoffs Quarterfinals (NL) |
| 9 | (Netherlands) Yoast United | 12 | 3 | 9 | 2313 | 2585 | −272 | 28 | Advance to National Playoffs Quarterfinals (NL) |
| 10 | (Netherlands) Den Helder Suns | 12 | 1 | 11 | 2131 | 2590 | −459 | 26 | |

Source: BNXT League

== National Playoffs ==
In the national playoffs, quarterfinals will be played best-of-three format (1–1–1), semifinals and finals will be played in a best-of-five format (1–1–1–1–1).

=== Belgium ===
==== Bracket ====
Quarterfinals
1 | Oostende | 2
8 | Leuven Bears | 0
4 | Spirou | 0
5 | Liege Basket | 2
2 | Antwerp Giants | 2
7 | Mons-Hainaut | 0
3 | Limburg United | 2
6 | Kangoeroes Mechelen | 1

Semifinals
1 | Oostende | 3
5 | Liege Basket | 1
2 | Antwerp Giants | 3
3 | Limburg United | 2

Finals
1 | Oostende | 3
2 | Antwerp Giants | 1

==== Quarterfinals ====
| Team 1 | Series | Team 2 | Game 1 | Game 2 | Game 3 |
|---|---|---|---|---|---|
| Oostende (Belgium) | 2–0 | (Belgium) Leuven Bears | 83–64 | 80–69 | — |
| Antwerp Giants (Belgium) | 2–0 | (Belgium) Mons-Hainaut | 80–64 | 86–71 | — |
| Limburg United (Belgium) | 2–1 | (Belgium) Kangoeroes Mechelen | 90–84 | 70–75 | 81–69 |
| Spirou (Belgium) | 0–2 | (Belgium) Liege Basket | 93–98 | 64–82 | — |

==== Semifinals ====
| Team 1 | Series | Team 2 | Game 1 | Game 2 | Game 3 | Game 4 | Game 5 |
|---|---|---|---|---|---|---|---|
| Oostende (Belgium) | 3–1 | (Belgium) Liege Basket | 82–64 | 77–72 | 89–95 | 83–63 | — |
| Antwerp Giants (Belgium) | 3–2 | (Belgium) Limburg United | 76–81 | 77–66 | 90–68 | 70–71 | 76–64 |

==== Finals ====
| Team 1 | Series | Team 2 | Game 1 | Game 2 | Game 3 | Game 4 | Game 5 |
|---|---|---|---|---|---|---|---|
| Oostende (Belgium) | 3–1 | (Belgium) Antwerp Giants | 93–89 | 66–87 | 82–69 | 74–71 | — |

=== Netherlands ===
==== Bracket ====
Quarterfinals
1 | Heroes Den Bosch | 2
8 | Yoast United | 0
4 | Donar | 2
5 | BAL | 1
2 | ZZ Leiden | 2
7 | Feyenoord | 0
3 | Landstede Hammers | 2
6 | LWD Basket | 0

Semifinals
1 | Heroes Den Bosch | 3
4 | Donar | 2
2 | ZZ Leiden | 3
3 | Landstede Hammers | 0

Finals
1 | Heroes Den Bosch | 1
2 | ZZ Leiden | 3

==== Quarterfinals ====
| Team 1 | Series | Team 2 | Game 1 | Game 2 | Game 3 |
|---|---|---|---|---|---|
| Heroes Den Bosch (Netherlands) | 2–0 | (Netherlands) Yoast United | 94–59 | 90–54 | — |
| Donar (Netherlands) | 2–1 | (Netherlands) BAL | 78–66 | 71–85 | 89–57 |
| ZZ Leiden (Netherlands) | 2–0 | (Netherlands) Feyenoord | 91–68 | 79–66 | — |
| Landstede Hammers (Netherlands) | 2–0 | (Netherlands) LWD Basket | 90–61 | 88–80 | — |

==== Semifinals ====
| Team 1 | Series | Team 2 | Game 1 | Game 2 | Game 3 | Game 4 | Game 5 |
|---|---|---|---|---|---|---|---|
| ZZ Leiden (Netherlands) | 3–0 | (Netherlands) Landstede Hammers | 68–60 | 64–58 | 79–71 | — | — |
| Heroes Den Bosch (Netherlands) | 3–2 | (Netherlands) Donar | 90–79 | 75–82 | 100–90 | 80–88 | 90–83 |

==== Finals ====
| Team 1 | Series | Team 2 | Game 1 | Game 2 | Game 3 | Game 4 | Game 5 |
|---|---|---|---|---|---|---|---|
| Heroes Den Bosch (Netherlands) | 1–3 | (Netherlands) ZZ Leiden | 89–96 | 65–83 | 79–65 | 81–92 | — |

== BNXT Playoffs ==
=== Finals ===
| Team 1 | Agg. | Team 2 | 1st leg | 2nd leg |
|---|---|---|---|---|
| Oostende (Belgium) | 164–124 | (Netherlands) ZZ Leiden | 85–58 | 79–66 |

== Individual awards ==
The winner of individual awards were announced on May 6, 2024.

| Category | Player | Team | Nominees | Ref. |
|---|---|---|---|---|
| Most Valuable Player (MVP) | (United States) Damien Jefferson | (Belgium) Oostende | (Belgium) Pierre-Antoine Gillet (Filou Oostende) (United States) Damien Jefferson (Filou Oostende) (United States) Rasir Bolton (Antwerp Giants) | |
| BNXT Finals MVP | (United States) Damien Jefferson | (Belgium) Oostende | – | |
| Belgian Playoff Finals MVP | (United States) Damien Jefferson | (Belgium) Oostende | – | |
| Dutch Playoff Finals MVP | (United States) Brock Gardner | (Netherlands) ZZ Leiden | – | |
| Dream Team | (Puerto Rico) Ángel Rodríguez | (Belgium) Liège Basket | – | |
| Dream Team | (United States) Damien Jefferson | (Belgium) Filou Oostende | – | |
| Dream Team | (Belgium) Pierre-Antoine Gillet | (Belgium) Filou Oostende | – | |
| Dream Team | (United States) Rasir Bolton | (Belgium) Telenet Giants Antwerp | – | |
| Dream Team | (Serbia) Nikola Jovanović | (Belgium) Telenet Giants Antwerp | – | |
| Dutch Player of the Year | (Netherlands) Marijn Ververs | (Netherlands) ZZ Leiden | (Netherlands) Marijn Ververs (ZZ Leiden) (Netherlands) Boy Van Vliet (Heroes Den Bosch) (Netherlands) Luuk Van Bree (ZZ Leiden) | |
| Belgian Player of the Year | (Belgium) Pierre-Antoine Gillet | (Belgium) Filou Oostende | (Belgium) Pierre-Antoine Gillet (Filou Oostende) (Belgium) Kevin Tumba (Liege Basket) (Belgium) Olivier Troisfontaines (Liege Basket) | |
| Rising Star of the Year (Netherlands) | (Netherlands) Jibbe Sicking | (Netherlands) ZZ Leiden | (Netherlands) Jibbe Sicking (ZZ Leiden) (Netherlands) Florian Rijkers (Yoast United) (Netherlands) Armin Stroijl (BAL) | |
| Rising Star of the Year (Belgium) | (Belgium) Jo Van Buggenhout | (Belgium) Telenet Giants Antwerp | (Belgium) Jo Van Buggenhout (Antwerp) (Belgium) Joppe Mennes (Filou Oostende) (Belgium) Siebe Ledegen (Okapi Aalst) | |
| Sixth Man of the Year | (Serbia) Nikola Jovanović | (Belgium) Telenet Giants Antwerp | (Belgium) Olivier Troisfontaines (Liege Basket) (Serbia) Nikola Jovanović (Antwerp Giants) (Netherlands) Roeland Schaftenaar (ZZ Leiden)) | |
| Defensive Player of the Year | (United States) Osun Osunniyi | (Belgium) Limburg United | (United States) Osun Osunniyi (Limburg United) (Belgium) Kevin Tumba (Liege Basket) (Belgium) Olivier Troisfontaines (Liege Basket) | |
| Coach of the Year (Netherlands) | (Netherlands) Radenko Varagić | (Netherlands) BAL | (Netherlands) Radenko Varagić (BAL) (Netherlands) Erik Braal (Heroes Den Bosch) (Germany) Doug Spradley (ZZ Leiden) | |
| Coach of the Year (Belgium) | (Croatia) Dario Gjergja | (Belgium) Filou Oostende | (Croatia) Dario Gjergja (Filou Oostende) (Belgium) Raymond Westphalen (Limburg United) (Belgium) Sam Rotsaert (Spirou) | |
| Referee of the Year (Netherlands) | (Netherlands) Tijmen Last | – | (Netherlands) Mohamed Shouman (Netherlands) Tijmen Last (Netherlands) Bert Van Slooten | |
| Referee of the Year (Belgium) | (Belgium) Nick Van Den Broeck | – | (Belgium) Renaud Geller (Belgium) Tom Delange (Belgium) Nick Van Den Broeck | |

== Statistics ==
The following were the statistical leaders in the 2023–24 regular season.

=== Individual statistic leaders ===
| Category | Player | Team(s) | Statistic |
|---|---|---|---|
| Points per game | Tyreke Key | Leuven Bears | 19.3 |
| Rebounds per game | Elyjah Goss | BAL | 10.1 |
| Assists per game | Boy Van Vliet | Heroes Den Bosch | 6.4 |
| Steals per game | Ángel Rodríguez | Liège Basket | 2.6 |
| Blocks per game | Osun Osunniyi | Limburg United | 1.8 |
| Efficiency per game | Noah Dickerson | Landstede Hammers | 23.3 |
| FT% | Brevin Pritzl | Kortrijk Spurs | 91.8% |
| 2P% | Shaquille Doorson | LWD Basket | 70.8% |
| 3P% | Tajion Jones | ZZ Leiden | 44.0% |

== BNXT clubs in European competitions ==
| Team | Competition | Result |
|---|---|---|
| (Basketball Belgium) Filou Oostende | Champions League | Play-ins |
| (Basketball Belgium) Antwerp Giants | Champions League | Qualifying round |
| (Basketball Nederland) Heroes Den Bosch | Champions League | Qualifying round |
| (Basketball Nederland) ZZ Leiden | FIBA Europe Cup | Second round |
| (Basketball Nederland) Heroes Den Bosch | FIBA Europe Cup | Regular season |
| (Basketball Nederland) Donar Groningen | FIBA Europe Cup | Qualifying tournament |

== BNXT clubs in Regional competitions ==
| Team | Competition | Results |
|---|---|---|
| (Basketball Belgium) Liège Basket | European North Basketball League | 3rd place |
| (Basketball Nederland) Landstede Hammers | European North Basketball League | Regular season |
