= 2022–23 BNXT League =

- League: BNXT League
- Sport: Basketball
- Duration: 30 September 2022–18 February 2023 (National phase); 3 March–28 April 2023 (Cross-border phase); 3 May–13 June 2023 (Playoffs)
- Teams: 20
- TV partner(s): Sporza; NPO 1 Ziggo Sport

Regular season
- Top seed: (Belgium) Antwerp Giants
- Season MVP: (United States) Brian Fobbs (Mechelen)
- Top scorer: (United States) Vincent Cole (Yoast United)

National playoffs
- Belgian champions: Oostende (24th title)
- Belgian runners-up: Antwerp Giants
- Dutch champions: ZZ Leiden (5th title)
- Dutch runners-up: Donar

Finals
- Champions: ZZ Leiden (2nd title)
- Runners-up: Oostende
- Finals MVP: David Collins (ZZ Leiden)

BNXT seasons
- ← 2021–22 2023–24 →

The 2022–23 BNXT League was the second season of the BNXT League, the highest professional basketball league in Belgium and the Netherlands. ZZ Leiden was the defending champion.

The season began on 30 September 2022.

== Competition formula ==
The league consisted of different stages with national championships and a common BeNeLeague championship.

	Teams entering in this round
National regular season (20 teams) 30.09.2022–18.02.2023	10 Belgian teams; 10 Dutch teams; All teams play each other home and away (18 games)
Elite Gold (10 teams) 03.03.2023–28.04.2023	Best 5 Dutch teams; Best 5 Belgian teams; Teams play 10 games
Elite Silver (10 teams) 03.03.2023–28.04.2023	Bottom-5 Dutch teams; Bottom-5 Belgian teams; Teams play 10 games
National play-offs (6 teams) Schedule: 03.05.2023–29.05.2023	Top two Gold teams from each country go directly to semifinals; Three other Gold teams play in quarter-finals; Best Silver team joins the quarter-finals
BNXT League play-offs (20 teams) Schedule: 03.05.2023–13.06.2023	BNXT playoffs R1: Elite Silver playoff (8 teams); BNXT playoffs R2: 4 Winners Elite Silver Playoff vs. 4 national PO . quarter-finalists dropping out; BNXT playoffs R3: Winners BNXT PO1 vs. losing semi-finalists national PO; BNXT playoffs R4: BNXT PO2 winners compete against each other; BNXT Quarter-finals: Winners BNXT PO3 vs. losing finalists national PO; BNXT Semi-finals: Winners BNXT PO4 vs. champions national PO; BNXT Finals: Winners BNXT PO5 will compete for the title of BNXT League Champion.

== Teams ==
On 20 June 2022, the league announced 20 teams obtained a club license. The Hague Royals were not granted a license.

Phoenix Brussels changed their name to Circus Brussels Basketball after they signed a new sponsorship deal.

=== Arenas and locations ===
Location of teams in the BNXT League

Note: Table lists in alphabetical order.

Club	Location	Venue	Capacity
Netherlands
Apollo Amsterdam	Amsterdam	Apollohal	1,500
Aris Leeuwarden	Leeuwarden	Kalverdijkje	1,700
BAL	Weert	Sporthal Boshoven	1,000
Den Helder Suns	Den Helder	Sporthal Sportlaan	1,000
Donar	Groningen	MartiniPlaza	4,350
Feyenoord	Rotterdam	Topsportcentrum Rotterdam	2,500
Heroes Den Bosch	's-Hertogenbosch	Maaspoort	2,800
Landstede Hammers	Zwolle	Landstede Sportcentrum	1,200
Yoast United	Bemmel	De Kooi	650
ZZ Leiden	Leiden	Vijf Meihal	2,000
Belgium
Antwerp Giants	Antwerp	Lotto Arena	5,218
Brussels Basketball	Brussels	Sports Complex Neder-Over-Heembeek	1,200
Kangoeroes Mechelen	Mechelen	Winketkaai	1,500
Leuven Bears	Leuven	Sportoase	3,400
Liège Basket	Liège	Country Hall	5,000
Limburg United	Hasselt	Alverberg Sporthal	1,730
Mons-Hainaut	Mons	Mons Arena	4,000
Okapi Aalst	Aalst	Okapi Forum	2,800
Oostende	Ostend	Coretec Dôme	5,000
Spirou	Charleroi	Spiroudome	6,200

=== Personnel and sponsorship ===
Team	Manager	Captain	Kit manufacturer	Main sponsor
Antwerp Giants	(Croatia) Ivica Skelin	(Belgium) Jean-Marc Mwema	Spalding	Telenet
Apollo Amsterdam	(Netherlands) Wierd Goedee		Nike	Behind The Arc
Aris Leeuwarden	(Netherlands) Vincent van Sliedregt	(Netherlands) Tim Hoeve	Craft	Vriezon
BAL	(Serbia) Radenko Varagić		Spalding	Enerparking
Brussels Basketball	(Belgium) Jean-Marc Jaumin	(Belgium) Terry Deroover	Macron	Circus
Den Helder Suns	(Netherlands) Peter van Noord	(Netherlands) Nino Gorissen	Spalding	TekPark
Donar	(Croatia) Andrej Štimac		Macron	FlexVirtual
Feyenoord	(Netherlands) Toon van Helfteren		Adidas	Zeeuw & Zeeuw
Heroes Den Bosch	(Netherlands) Erik Braal	(Netherlands) Boy van Vliet	Macron	Inamood
Kangoeroes Mechelen	(Belgium) Kristof Michiels	(Belgium) Wen Mukubu	Spalding	Bengal
Landstede Hammers	(Netherlands) Mark van Schutterhoef (a.i.)		Acerbis	Landstede
Leuven Bears	(Belgium) Eddy Casteels	(United States) Joshua Heath	Spalding	Stella Artois
Liège Basket	(United States) Brad Greenberg	(Belgium) Brieuc Lemaire	Ohka	Solidbeton
Limburg United	(Belgium) Raymond Westphalen	(United States) Clifford Hammonds	K1x	Hubo Belgium
Mons-Hainaut	(Bosnia and Herzegovina) Vedran Bosnić	(United States) Justin Cage	Olympic	Belfius
Okapi Aalst	(Belgium) Thomas Crab	(Belgium) Ivan Maras	Spalding	CheckNet
Oostende	(Croatia) Dario Gjergja	(Serbia) Dušan Đorđević	Spalding	Filou
Spirou	(Belgium) Sam Rotsaert	(Belgium) Alex Libert	Spalding	RTL
Yoast United	(Belgium) Paul Vervaeck		Jako	Yoast SEO
ZZ Leiden	(United States) Doug Spradley	(Netherlands) Marijn Ververs	Peak	Zorg en Zekerheid

=== Coaching changes ===
Team	Outgoing coach	Manner of departure	Date of vacancy	Position in table	Incoming coach	Date of appointment
Antwerp Giants	Luc Smout	End of interim spell	10 May 2022	Pre-season	Ivica Skelin	10 May 2022
ZZ Leiden	Geert Hammink	Signed with Skyliners Frankfurt	17 June 2022	Pre-season	Doug Spradley	15 August 2022
Donar	Matthew Otten	Fired	13 October 2022	10th (0–1)	Andrej Štimac	13 October 2022
Liège Basket	Lionel Bosco	Fired	15 December 2022	10th (2-6)	Brad Greenberg	7 January 2023
Landstede Hammers	Herman van den Belt	Mutual agreement	7 March 2023		Mark van Schutterhoef (interim)	7 March 2023
Feyenoord	Toon van Helfteren	Fired	21 April 2023	18th (1–7 in Elite Gold)	Armand Salomon (interim)	21 April 2023

== National Round ==
=== Netherlands ===
==== Standings ====
Pos	Team	Pld	W	L	PF	PA	PD	Pts	Qualification
1	Heroes Den Bosch	18	18	0	1607	1177	+430	36	Advance to Elite Gold
2	ZZ Leiden	18	13	5	1411	1173	+238	31	Advance to Elite Gold
3	Landstede Hammers	18	11	7	1477	1367	+110	29	Advance to Elite Gold
4	Aris Leeuwarden	18	11	7	1457	1386	+71	29	Advance to Elite Gold
5	Donar	18	10	8	1383	1269	+114	28	Advance to Elite Gold
6	Yoast United	18	10	8	1475	1448	+27	28	Advance to Elite Silver
7	Feyenoord	18	8	10	1336	1335	+1	26	Advance to Elite Silver
8	Den Helder Suns	18	4	14	1264	1553	−289	22	Advance to Elite Silver
9	BAL	18	4	14	1222	1483	−261	22	Advance to Elite Silver
10	Apollo Amsterdam	18	1	17	1126	1567	−441	19	Advance to Elite Silver

Updated to match(es) played on completed. Source: BNXT League

==== Results ====
Home \ Away	AMS	ARI	BAL	DON	DHE	FEY	HDB	LAN	YOA	ZZL
Apollo Amsterdam	—	68–86	74–79	58–87	84–81	63–81	50–112	69–95	74–98	0–20
Aris Leeuwarden	110–94	—	74–55	88–80	91–67	83–72	74–78	79–69	92–94	75–76
BAL	89–80	62–73	—	52–78	75–77	65–82	63–103	85–109	93–100	58–72
Donar	100–57	70–76	76–63	—	96–57	64–57	65–77	72–69	78–68	62–70
Den Helder Suns	81–79	75–77	78–72	71–103	—	61–88	62–79	71–93	80–93	79–105
Feyenoord	84–56	87–70	66–69	89–87	52–66	—	57–70	77–82	77–73	80–75
Heroes Den Bosch	89–41	85–70	99–50	94–59	96–61	111–74	—	91–78	91–71	79–74
Landstede Hammers	94–62	93–76	69–79	63–68	80–72	85–73	63–80	—	78–73	84–83
Yoast United	86–68	74–93	74–70	76–70	97–66	85–74	84–85	81–108	—	68–79
ZZ Leiden	95–49	87–70	99–43	84–68	93–59	70–66	81–88	76–65	72–80	—

Updated to match(es) played on completed. Source: BNXT League
Legend: Blue = home team win; Red = away team win.

=== Belgium ===
==== Standings ====
Pos	Team	Pld	W	L	PF	PA	PD	Pts	Qualification
1	Oostende	18	14	4	1589	1385	+204	32	Advance to Elite Gold
2	Antwerp Giants	18	12	6	1431	1309	+122	30	Advance to Elite Gold
3	Kangoeroes Mechelen	18	11	7	1504	1425	+79	29	Advance to Elite Gold
4	Limburg United	18	10	8	1528	1473	+55	28	Advance to Elite Gold
5	Spirou	18	10	8	1447	1363	+84	28	Advance to Elite Gold
6	Leuven Bears	18	8	10	1376	1379	−3	26	Advance to Elite Silver
7	Okapi Aalst	18	8	10	1419	1457	−38	26	Advance to Elite Silver
8	Mons-Hainaut	18	7	11	1469	1539	−70	25	Advance to Elite Silver
9	Liège Basket	18	6	12	1379	1556	−177	24	Advance to Elite Silver
10	Circus Brussels	18	4	14	1321	1577	−256	22	Advance to Elite Silver

Updated to match(es) played on completed. Source: BNXT League

==== Results ====
Home \ Away	ANT	BRU	LEU	LIE	LIM	MEC	MON	OKA	OOS	SPI
Antwerp Giants	—	89–55	61–57	84–64	90–79	84–75	79–62	96–62	64–80	66–77
Circus Brussels	67–93	—	73–71	82–77	71–79	81–73	114–110	68–78	84–115	55–74
Leuven Bears	59–74	69–53	—	92–76	84–76	72–68	83–94	88–69	75–79	83–81
Liège Basket	81–89	86–81	78–74	—	85–105	65–81	86–95	82–73	87–78	69–74
Limburg United	80–66	102–81	80–76	90–78	—	91–99	101–79	80–76	75–82	90–78
Kangoeroes Mechelen	99–77	85–71	91–75	84–85	85–79	—	89–80	90–98	91–97	82–71
Mons-Hainaut	75–77	110–85	71–93	99–70	98–87	67–80	—	72–62	80–78	66–102
Okapi Aalst	78–76	85–80	83–74	84–86	80–82	77–81	88–71	—	80–82	86–80
Oostende	91–88	101–54	103–75	108–62	85–77	79–63	78–70	95–67	—	88–101
Spirou	68–78	80–66	69–76	83–62	80–75	76–88	114–110	74–93	92–70	—

Updated to match(es) played on completed. Source: BNXT League
Legend: Blue = home team win; Red = away team win.

== International Round ==
=== Elite Gold ===
==== Standings ====
Pos	Team	Pld	W	L	PF	PA	PD	Pts	Qualification
1	(Belgium) Antwerp Giants	10	10	0	2194	1951	+243	35	Advance to National Playoffs Semifinals (BE)
2	(Belgium) Oostende	10	8	2	2424	2055	+369	34	Advance to National Playoffs Semifinals (BE)
3	(Belgium) Kangoeroes Mechelen	10	8	2	2281	2145	+136	33	Advance to National Playoffs Quarterfinals (BE)
4	(Netherlands) ZZ Leiden	10	5	5	2156	1919	+237	31	Advance to National Playoffs Semifinals (NL)
5	(Netherlands) Heroes Den Bosch	10	2	8	2319	1937	+382	30	Advance to National Playoffs Semifinals (NL)
6	(Netherlands) Donar	10	6	4	2082	1950	+132	30	Advance to National Playoffs Quarterfinals (NL)
7	(Netherlands) Landstede Hammers	10	3	7	2115	2135	−20	28	Advance to National Playoffs Quarterfinals (NL)
8	(Belgium) Limburg United	10	4	6	2305	2210	+95	28	Advance to National Playoffs Quarterfinals (BE)
9	(Belgium) Spirou	10	4	6	2236	2193	+43	28	Advance to National Playoffs Quarterfinals (BE)
10	(Netherlands) Aris Leeuwarden	10	0	10	2211	2291	−80	25	Advance to National Playoffs Quarterfinals (NL)

Source: BNXT League

==== Results ====
Home \ Away	ANT	ARI	DON	HDB	LAN	LIM	MEC	OOS	SPI	ZZL
Antwerp Giants	—	83–63	88–81	55–54	81–64	—	—	—	—	76–64
Aris Leeuwarden	68–87	—	—	—	—	75–88	90–96	78–97	84–99	—
Donar	51–65	—	—	—	—	68–66	73–48	63–60	69–55	—
Heroes Den Bosch	65–70	—	—	—	—	92–88	71–74	76–86	88–64	—
Landstede Hammers	57–81	—	—	—	—	77–72	84–81	66–77	97–83	—
Limburg United	—	96–77	77–88	84–77	81–51	—	—	—	—	70–73
Kangoeroes Mechelen	—	76–61	74–72	70–53	101–62	—	—	—	—	80–79
Oostende	—	100–80	80–63	82–56	97–52	—	—	—	—	81–56
Spirou	—	83–78	68–71	87–80	95–79	—	—	—	—	89–98
ZZ Leiden	75–77	—	—	—	—	59–55	75–77	80–75	86–66	—

Source: BNXT League
Legend: Blue = home team win; Red = away team win.

=== Elite Silver ===
==== Standings ====
Pos	Team	Pld	W	L	PF	PA	PD	Pts	Qualification
1	(Belgium) Leuven Bears	10	10	0	2238	2034	+204	33	Advance to National Playoffs Quarterfinals (BE)
2	(Belgium) Okapi Aalst	10	9	1	2361	2237	+124	32	Advance to BNXT Playoffs
3	(Belgium) Mons-Hainaut	10	8	2	2276	2268	+8	31	Advance to BNXT Playoffs
4	(Belgium) Liège Basket	10	7	3	2231	2313	−82	29	Advance to BNXT Playoffs
5	(Netherlands) Yoast United	10	3	7	2276	2288	−12	27	Advance to National Playoffs Quarterfinals (NL)
6	(Belgium) Phoenix Brussels	10	5	5	2173	2431	−258	26	Advance to BNXT Playoffs
7	(Netherlands) Feyenoord	10	2	8	2107	2170	−63	25	Advance to BNXT Playoffs
8	(Netherlands) BAL	10	3	7	1954	2302	−348	24	Advance to BNXT Playoffs
9	(Netherlands) Den Helder Suns	10	2	8	2026	2462	−436	23	Advance to BNXT Playoffs
10	(Netherlands) Apollo Amsterdam	10	1	9	1835	2479	−644	20	Advance to BNXT Playoffs

Source: BNXT League

==== Results ====
Home \ Away	AMS	BAL	BRU	DHE	FEY	LEU	LIE	MON	OKA	YOA
Apollo Amsterdam	—	—	75–86	—	—	57–82	69–64	79–87	90–106	—
BAL	—	—	69–74	—	—	71–74	82–88	70–66	91–89	—
Phoenix Brussels	86–81	71–77	—	104–109	97–105	—	—	—	—	89–84
Den Helder Suns	—	—	90–89	—	—	77–87	72–87	69–89	76–77	—
Feyenoord	—	—	82–87	—	—	76–88	76–95	65–66	72–78	—
Leuven Bears	104–58	83–65	—	85–56	69–62	—	—	—	—	98–71
Liège Basket	103–60	93–66	—	98–68	74–96	—	—	—	—	79–67
Mons-Hainaut	90–64	79–74	—	88–64	82–72	—	—	—	—	64–82
Okapi Aalst	104–76	102–67	—	105–81	99–65	—	—	—	—	97–83
Yoast United	—	—	82–69	—	—	62–92	101–71	90–96	79–85	—

Source: BNXT League
Legend: Blue = home team win; Red = away team win.

== National Playoffs ==
In the national playoffs, quarterfinals will be played best-of-three format (1–1–1), semifinals and finals will be played in a best-of-five format (1–1–1–1–1).

=== Netherlands ===
==== Bracket ====
Quarterfinals; 3–7 May
4	Landstede Hammers	1
5	Aris Leeuwarden	2
3	Donar	2
6	Yoast United	0

Semifinals; 10–18 May
1	ZZ Leiden	3
5	Aris Leeuwarden	0
2	Heroes Den Bosch	1
3	Donar	3

Finals; 21 May–29 May
1	ZZ Leiden	3
3	Donar	2

==== Quarterfinals ====
Team 1	Series	Team 2	Game 1	Game 2	Game 3
Donar (Netherlands)	2–0	(Netherlands) Yoast United	75–65	89–72	—
Landstede Hammers (Netherlands)	1–2	(Netherlands) Aris Leeuwarden	98–101	80–76	82–101

==== Semifinals ====
Team 1	Series	Team 2	Game 1	Game 2	Game 3	Game 4	Game 5
ZZ Leiden (Netherlands)	3–0	(Netherlands) Aris Leeuwarden	99–93	72–64	98–94	—	—
Heroes Den Bosch (Netherlands)	1–3	(Netherlands) Donar	71–68	60–69	65–78	54–67	—

==== Finals ====
Team 1	Series	Team 2	Game 1	Game 2	Game 3	Game 4	Game 5
ZZ Leiden (Netherlands)	3–2	(Netherlands) Donar	91–94	68–65	55–64	68–45	82–81

=== Belgium ===
==== Bracket ====
Quarterfinals; 3–7 May
4	Limburg United	2
5	Spirou	0
3	Kangoeroes Mechelen	2
6	Leuven Bears	1

Semifinals; 10–18 May
1	Antwerp Giants	3
4	Limburg United	1
2	Oostende	3
3	Kangoeroes Mechelen	2

Finals; 21–29 May
1	Antwerp Giants	1
2	Oostende	3

==== Quarterfinals ====
Team 1	Series	Team 2	Game 1	Game 2	Game 3
Limburg United (Belgium)	2–0	(Belgium) Spirou	81–71	83–77	—
Kangoeroes Mechelen (Belgium)	2–1	(Belgium) Leuven Bears	75–62	62–86	98–89

==== Semifinals ====
Team 1	Series	Team 2	Game 1	Game 2	Game 3	Game 4	Game 5
Antwerp Giants (Belgium)	3–1	(Belgium) Limburg United	59–77	62–50	89–74	77–70	—
Oostende (Belgium)	3–2	(Belgium) Kangoeroes Mechelen	87–77	70–73	84–74	77–92	82–59

==== Finals ====
Team 1	Series	Team 2	Game 1	Game 2	Game 3	Game 4	Game 5
Antwerp Giants (Belgium)	1–3	(Belgium) Oostende	63–62	60–94	70–86	60–81	—

== BNXT Playoffs ==
The highest ranked team before the start of the playoffs always has the home court advantage. This means that they always play the last game of a playoff series or a home and away matchup at home.

=== First round ===
Team 1	Agg.	Team 2	1st leg	2nd leg
Okapi Aalst (Belgium)	188–161	(Netherlands) Apollo Amsterdam	87–94	101–67
Circus Brussels Basketball (Belgium)	152–137	(Netherlands) Feyenoord	77–75	75–62
Mons-Hainaut (Belgium)	176–165	(Netherlands) Den Helder Suns	98–82	78–83
Liège Basket (Belgium)	170–120	(Netherlands) BAL	80–68	90–52

=== Second round ===
Team 1	Agg.	Team 2	1st leg	2nd leg
Leuven Bears (Belgium)	176–146	(Belgium) Okapi Aalst	75–81	101–65
Spirou (Belgium)	169–144	(Belgium) Circus Brussels Basketball	84–61	85–83
Landstede Hammers (Netherlands)	179–186	(Belgium) Liège Basket	79–94	100–92
Yoast United (Netherlands)	166–168	(Belgium) Mons-Hainaut	75–86	91–82

=== Third round ===
Team 1	Agg.	Team 2	1st leg	2nd leg
Heroes Den Bosch (Netherlands)	141–154	(Belgium) Leuven Bears	70–80	71–74
Aris Leeuwarden (Netherlands)	149–177	(Belgium) Spirou	84–91	65–86
Limburg United (Belgium)	179–157	(Belgium) Liège Basket	88–79	91–78
Kangoeroes Mechelen (Belgium)	158–117	(Belgium) Mons-Hainaut	93–61	65–56

=== Fourth round ===
Team 1	Agg.	Team 2	1st leg	2nd leg
Leuven Bears (Belgium)	154–162	(Belgium) Spirou	82–83	72–79
Limburg United (Belgium)	176–144	(Belgium) Kangoeroes Mechelen	93–71	83–73

=== Quarterfinals ===
Team 1	Agg.	Team 2	1st leg	2nd leg
Antwerp Giants (Belgium)	134–162	(Belgium) Spirou	67–85	67–77
Donar (Netherlands)	164–175	(Belgium) Limburg United	67–87	97–88

=== Semifinals ===
Team 1	Agg.	Team 2	1st leg	2nd leg
ZZ Leiden (Netherlands)	157–125	(Belgium) Spirou	86–67	71–58
Oostende (Belgium)	190–154	(Belgium) Limburg United	86–87	104–67

=== Finals ===
Team 1	Series	Team 2	Game 1	Game 2	Game 3
Oostende (Belgium)	1–2	(Netherlands) ZZ Leiden	66–79	76–63	80–91

== Individual awards ==
The winner of individual awards were announced on April 25, 2023.

Category	Player	Team	Nominees	Ref.
Most Valuable Player (MVP)	(United States) Brian Fobbs	(Belgium) Kangoeroes Mechelen	(United States) Desonta Bradford (Antwerp Giants) (United States) Brian Fobbs (Kangoeroes) (United States) Breein Tyree (Filou Oostende)	
BNXT Finals MVP	(United States) David Collins	(Netherlands) ZZ Leiden	–	
Belgian Playoff Finals MVP	(Belgium) Vrenz Bleijenbergh	(Belgium) Filou Oostende	–	
Dutch Playoff Finals MVP	(United States) Thomas Rutherford	(Netherlands) ZZ Leiden	–	
Dream Team	(United States) Breein Tyree	(Belgium) Filou Oostende	–	
Dream Team	(United States) Brian Fobbs	(Belgium) Kangoeroes Mechelen	–	
Dream Team	(Belgium) Pierre-Antoine Gillet	(Belgium) Filou Oostende	–	
Dream Team	(United States) Vincent Cole	(Netherlands) Yoast United	–	
Dream Team	(Belgium) Thijs De Ridder	(Belgium) Telenet Giants Antwerp	–	
Dutch Player of the Year	(Netherlands) Thomas van der Mars	(Netherlands) Heroes Den Bosch	(Netherlands) Marijn Ververs (ZZ Leiden) (Netherlands) Sam Van Oostrum (Den Helder Suns) (Netherlands) Thomas van der Mars (Heroes Den Bosch)	
Belgian Player of the Year	(Belgium) Pierre-Antoine Gillet	(Belgium) Filou Oostende	(Belgium) Pierre-Antoine Gillet (Filou Oostende) (Belgium) Jonas Delalieux (Limburg United) (Belgium) Domien Loubry (Kangoeroes)	
Rising Star of the Year (Netherlands)	(Netherlands) Oshean Brathwaite	(Netherlands) BAL	(Netherlands) Oshean Brathwaite (BAL) (Netherlands) Isaï Sow (Feyenoord) (Netherlands) Jibbe Sicking (Apollo Amsterdam)	
Rising Star of the Year (Belgium)	(Belgium) Thijs De Ridder	(Belgium) Telenet Giants Antwerp	(Belgium) Jo Van Buggenhout (Kangoeroes Mechelen) (Belgium) Thijs De Ridder (Antwerp Giants) (Belgium) Siebe Ledegen (Okapi Aalst)	
Sixth Man of the Year	(Belgium) Thijs De Ridder	(Belgium) Telenet Giants Antwerp	(Belgium) Olivier Troisfontaines (Filou Oostende) (Netherlands) Maarten Bouwknecht (ZZ Leiden) (Belgium) Thijs De Ridder (Antwerp Giants)	
Defensive Player of the Year	(Belgium) Wen Mukubu	(Belgium) Kangoeroes Mechelen	(Norway) Chris Ebou N'Dow (Heroes Den Bosch) (Belgium) Jean-Marc Mwema (Antwerp Giants) (Belgium) Wen Mukubu (Kangoeroes)	
Coach of the Year (Netherlands)	(Germany) Doug Spradley	(Netherlands) ZZ Leiden	(Netherlands) Vincent Van Sliedregt (Aris Leeuwarden) (Netherlands) Erik Braal (Heroes Den Bosch) (Germany) Doug Spradley (ZZ Leiden)	
Coach of the Year (Belgium)	(Croatia) Ivica Skelin	(Belgium) Telenet Giants Antwerp	(Belgium) Kristof Michiels (Kangoeroes) (Croatia) Ivica Skelin (Antwerp Giants) (Belgium) Sam Rotsaert (Spirou)	
Referee of the Year (Netherlands)	(Netherlands) Tijmen Last	–	(Netherlands) John Van Dam (Netherlands) Tijmen Last (Netherlands) Bert Van Slooten	
Referee of the Year (Belgium)	(Belgium) Nick Van Den Broeck	–	(Belgium) Renaud Geller (Belgium) Martin Van Hoye (Belgium) Nick Van Den Broeck	

== Statistics ==
The following were the statistical leaders in the 2022–23 regular season.

=== Individual statistic leaders ===
Category	Player	Team(s)	Statistic
Points per game	Vincent Cole	Yoast United	22.3
Rebounds per game	Arnaldo Toro Barea	Landstede Hammers	12.8
Assists per game	Joshua Heath	Leuven Bears	7.3
Steals per game	Ángel Rodríguez	Liège Basket	3.7
Blocks per game	Kevin Tumba	Liège Basket	1.5
Efficiency per game	Ivan Maraš	Okapi Aalst	25.1
FT%	Terry Deroover	Circus Brussels	93.9%
2P%	Haris Bratanovic	Filou Oostende	76.8%
3P%	Keime Helfrich	Heroes Den Bosch	47.7%

== In European competitions ==
Team	Competition	Progress
Oostende	Champions League	Play-ins
Heroes Den Bosch	Champions League	Qualifying rounds
Heroes Den Bosch	FIBA Europe Cup	Second Round
Kangoeroes Mechelen	FIBA Europe Cup	Regular season
Donar Groningen	FIBA Europe Cup	Regular season
Antwerp Giants	FIBA Europe Cup	Regular season
ZZ Leiden	FIBA Europe Cup	Qualifying rounds
