= Niels Van Den Eynde =

Belgian basketball player

Niels Van den Eynde
No. 9 – Okapi Aalst
- Position: Point guard
- League: BNXT League

Personal information
- Born: 27 December 2000 (age 25) Lier, Belgium
- Listed height: 1.80 m (5 ft 11 in)
- Listed weight: 74 kg (163 lb)

Career information
- Playing career: 2019–present

Career history
- 2019–2022: Antwerp Giants
- 2022–2023: Liège Basket
- 2023–2024: Kangoeroes Basket Mechelen
- 2024–present: Okapi Aalst

Career highlights
- BNXT Belgian Player of the Year (2026)
Medals
Men's basketball
Representing Belgium
FIBA U20 European Championship Division B
Bronze medal – third place	2019 Portugal	Team
FIBA U18 European Championship Division B
Bronze medal – third place	2018 Macedonia	Team

Niels Van Den Eynde (born 27 December 2000) is a Belgian basketball player for Okapi Aalst of the BNXT League and for Belgian national team. His cousins Bastiaan Van den Eynde and Matthijs Van den Eynde both play basketball professionally.

== Professional career ==
Van Den Eynde played for BC Guco Lier in his younger years, and helped the team promote to the Belgian Second Division. He averaged 23 points, 4 rebounds and 5 assists in the 2019–20 national second division.

On 15 May 2020, he signed a professional contract with Telenet Giants Antwerp. In his rookie year, he averaged 5.3 points per game. In his second year, he averaged 7.2 points and 2.9 assists per game in 16.2 minutes. Twice, he was selected for the BNXT League Rising Star of the Year, but never won the award.

On 16 April 2022 he signed with Liège Basket of the BNXT League. where he averaged 13.5 points, 4.2 assists and 2.3 rebounds per game in 26.2 minutes. On 5 June 2023 he announced that he will no longer play for Liège Basket in the 2023–2024 season.

During the 2023–2024 season, he played for Kangoeroes Basket Mechelen.

Since 2023, he was a member of the Belgian Lions. He participated in the EuroBasket Qualifiers 2025, playing twice against Latvia.

After a difficult season in Mechelen, he signed for Okapi Aalst. After coming of the bench in the first 10 games, he became a starter for Eddy Casteels’s team. At the end of the regular season, he was selected second, behind Niels De Ridder, for the BNXT League Player of the Year. He averaged 14.8 points and dished out 5.2 assists.

He represented Belgium in EuroBasket 2025.

Niels Van Den Eynde enjoyed a breakout second season with Okapi Aalst, establishing himself as one of the top guards in the Belgian league. During the campaign, Van Den Eynde averaged 14.8 points and 7.5 assists per game, leading Okapi Aalst's offense with his playmaking and scoring ability. His performances earned him the league's BNXT League Player of the Year, recognizing his impact throughout the season. Under his leadership, Okapi Aalst finished third in the regular-season standings, marking one of the club's strongest recent campaigns. Van Den Eynde was widely praised for his court vision, leadership, and consistency, becoming a fan favorite in Aalst. His standout season significantly raised his profile within Belgian basketball and cemented his reputation as one of the country's premier point guards.
