= Pierre-Antoine Gillet =

Belgian basketball player

No. 30 – Oostende
- Position: Power forward
- League: BNXT League

Personal information
- Born: 16 April 1991 (age 35) Huy, Belgium
- Listed height: 6 ft 9 in (2.06 m)
- Listed weight: 232 lb (105 kg)

Career information
- NBA draft: 2013: undrafted
- Playing career: 2009–present

Career history
- 2009–2013: Liège
- 2013–2017: Oostende
- 2017–2018: Élan Chalon
- 2018–2019: Tenerife
- 2019–2020: Fuenlabrada
- 2020–present: Oostende

Career highlights
- Belgian Cup MVP (2025); BNXT League champion (2024); 2× BNXT Belgian Player of the Year (2023, 2024); 2× BNXT League Dream Team (2023, 2024); 3x Belgian Player of the Year (2015, 2023, 2024); 9× Belgian League champion (2014–2017, 2021-2025); 6× Belgian Cup winner (2014–2017, 2021, 2025); Belgian League Most Promising Player (2014); 3× Belgian Supercup winner (2009, 2014, 2015)

Pierre-Antoine Gillet (born 16 April 1991) is a Belgian professional basketball player for Filou Oostende of the BNXT League. He also represents the Belgian national basketball team. Standing at 6 ft 9 in (2.06 m), he plays at the Power Forward position.

== Early life ==
Gillet started playing basketball at the age of nine.

== Professional career ==
On 31 August 2020 Gillet signed a three-year deal with Filou Oostende of the Belgian Pro Basketball League. He helped the team win the league title, averaging 10.6 points, 4.8 rebounds, and 1.5 assists per game. Gillet re-signed with the team on 11 August 2021.

== International career ==
He represented Belgium at the EuroBasket 2015 where they lost to Greece in eighth finals with 75–54.
