= Fobbs =

Fobbs is a surname. Notable people with the surname include:

- Brandon Fobbs (born 1981), American actor
- Brian Fobbs (born 1998), American basketball player
- Broderick Fobbs (born 1974), American college football coach
- Lee Fobbs (1950–2026), American football player and coach
