= Marijn Ververs =

Dutch basketball player

No. 3 – Hubo Limburg United
- Position: Point guard / shooting guard
- League: BNXT League

Personal information
- Born: September 17, 1998 (age 28) Netherlands
- Listed height: 1.94 cm (1 in)
- Listed weight: 84 kg (185 lb)

Career information
- Playing career: 2016–present

Career history
- 2016–2024: ZZ Leiden
- 2024–2025: BG Göttingen
- 2025: Filou Oostende
- 2025–present: Limburg United

Career highlights
- Belgian League champion (2025); Belgian Cup winner (2025); 2x BNXT Dutch Player of the Year (2024, 2026); BNXT Sixth Man of the Year (2024); 2× BNXT League champion (2022, 2023); 3× Dutch League champion (2021, 2023, 2024); 2× Dutch Cup winner (2019, 2023); 2× Dutch Supercup winner (2021, 2023); DBL All-Rookie Team (2017)

Marijn Ververs (born 17 September 1998) is a Dutch basketball player for Limburg United of the BNXT League. Having played in ZZ Leiden's youth academy, he made his professional debut in 2016. Ververs played eight seasons with Leiden, winning three national championships in the process and being named the BNXT League Best Dutch Player in 2024. He joined BG Göttingen, his first foreign club, in 2024. He has been a player for the Netherlands national team.

== Professional career ==
=== ZZ Leiden (2016–2024) ===
Ververs, a product of the ZZ Leiden youth academy, made his professional debut with the senior team the 2016–17 season under coach Paul Vervaeck. In June 2020, Ververs signed a 2-year extension with Leiden. In the 2020–21 season, he was named captain of the team. In the 2020–21 season, he won his first DBL championship with Leiden.

On 14 June 2022, Ververs extended his contract with Leiden for three more seasons, until 2025. He won his second national championship in 2023, and his third championship in 2024.

=== BG Göttingen (2024–2025) ===
Ververs signed in Germany with BG Göttingen of the Basketball Bundesliga (BBL) on 17 June 2024. ZZ Leiden agreed to terminate his contract in order for him to be able to sign for Göttingen.

=== BC Oostende (2025) ===
On January 28, 2025, he signed with Filou Oostende of the BNXT League.

=== Limburg United (2025–present) ===
On June 20, 2025, he signed with Limburg United of the BNXT League.

== National team career ==
In the summer of 2021, Ververs was selected for the 20-man preliminary team of the Netherlands national basketball team. He played his first international match for the Orange Lions against Russia in Perm on 24 February 2022. Ververs was on the preliminary roster for EuroBasket 2022, but was cut from the team two days before the tournament during the final selection.
