= Damien Jefferson =

American basketball player (born 1997)

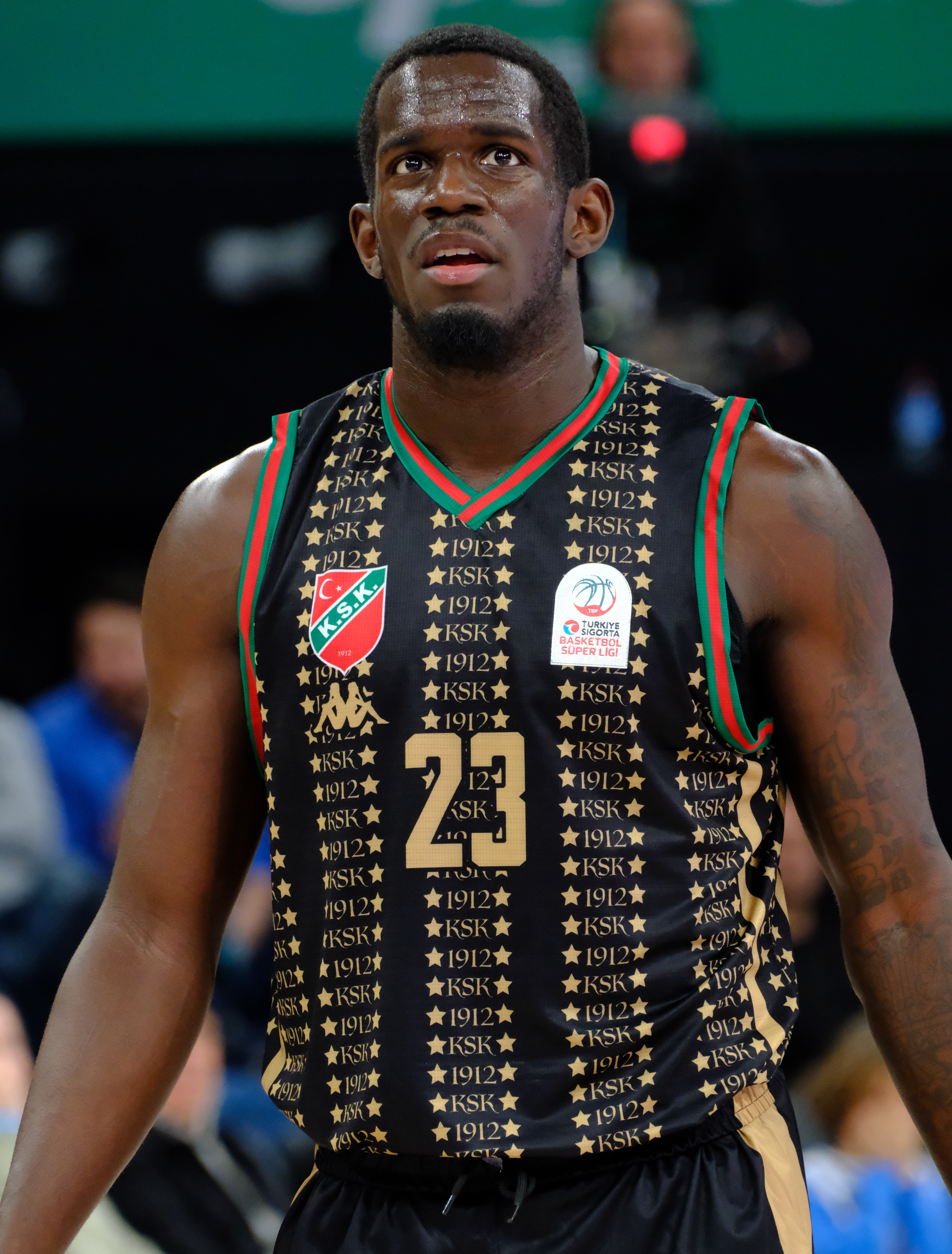
- Jefferson with Karşıyaka in 2024

No. 23 – Pizza Bulls Bordo Bandırma
- Position: Small forward
- League: BSL

Personal information
- Born: October 3, 1997 (age 29) East Chicago, Indiana, U.S.
- Listed height: 6 ft 5 in (1.96 m)
- Listed weight: 220 lb (100 kg)

Career information
- High school: Central (East Chicago, Indiana)
- College: New Mexico (2016–2017); Creighton (2018–2021)
- NBA draft: 2021: undrafted
- Playing career: 2021–present

Career history
- 2021–2022: Stockton Kings
- 2022–2023: Memphis Hustle
- 2023–2024: Oostende
- 2024: Karşıyaka
- 2025–2026: Karditsa
- 2026–present: Bandırma Bordo Basketbol

Career highlights
- BNXT League champion (2024); Belgian League champion (2024); BNXT Supercup winner (2023); BNXT League MVP (2024); BNXT League Finals MVP (2024); BNXT Belgian Finals MVP (2024); BNXT League Dream Team (2024); Second-team All-Big East (2021)
- Stats at NBA.com
- Stats at Basketball Reference

Damien Jefferson (born October 3, 1997) is an American professional basketball player for Pizza Bulls Bordo Bandırma of the Basketbol Süper Ligi (BSL). He played college basketball for the New Mexico Lobos and the Creighton Bluejays.

== Early life ==
Jefferson attended Central High School in East Chicago, Indiana. As a senior, he averaged 26.1 points and 8.1 rebounds per game and was named The Times of Northwest Indiana Player of the Year. Jefferson led his team to a Class 4A sectional title and was named an Indiana All-Star. He committed to playing college basketball for New Mexico, his father's alma mater.

== College career ==
Jefferson averaged 5.3 points and 2.3 rebounds as a freshman at New Mexico. For his sophomore season, he transferred to Creighton and sat out for one year due to transfer rules. As a sophomore, Jefferson averaged 6.2 points and four rebounds per game before his season was cut short due to a high ankle sprain injury. In his junior season, he averaged 9.4 points and 5.5 rebounds per game. Jefferson declared for the 2020 NBA draft before withdrawing and returning to college. On December 17, 2020, he flirted with a triple-double, recording 10 points, 10 rebounds and eight assists in a 94–76 win over St. John's. As a senior, Jefferson earned Second Team All-Big East honors. He averaged 11.9 points and 5.4 rebounds per game. Jefferson declared for the 2021 NBA draft, forgoing an additional season of eligibility the NCAA granted due to the COVID-19 pandemic.

== Professional career ==
Jefferson joined the Sacramento Kings for the 2021 NBA Summer League, winning a summer league championship. He joined the Stockton Kings as an affiliate player on October 25, 2021, but was later waived on January 29, 2022. He was acquired by the Memphis Hustle on February 14.

On July 31, 2023, Jefferson signed with Filou Oostende of the BNXT League.

On August 11, 2024, he signed with Karşıyaka Basket of the Basketbol Süper Ligi (BSL).

On August 8, 2025, Jefferson signed with Greek club Karditsa.

On July 2, 2026, he signed with Bandırma Bordo Basketbol of the Basketbol Süper Ligi (BSL).

== Career statistics ==
Legend
GP	Games played	GS	Games started	MPG	Minutes per game
FG%	Field goal percentage	3P%	3-point field goal percentage	FT%	Free throw percentage
RPG	Rebounds per game	APG	Assists per game	SPG	Steals per game
BPG	Blocks per game	PPG	Points per game	**Bold**	Career high

=== College ===
Year	Team	GP	GS	MPG	FG%	3P%	FT%	RPG	APG	SPG	BPG	PPG
2016–17	New Mexico	29	6	15.1	.438	.214	.490	2.3	1.0	.4	.1	5.3
2017–18	Creighton	Redshirt										
2018–19	Creighton	26	16	18.0	**.535**	**.412**	.634	4.0	.8	.4	.1	6.2
2019–20	Creighton	30	29	27.1	.533	.217	**.635**	**5.5**	1.4	.6	.2	9.4
2020–21	Creighton	**31**	**31**	**30.9**	.512	.348	.605	5.4	**2.4**	**1.2**	**.3**	**11.9**
Career		116	82	23.0	.509	.304	.592	4.4	1.4	.7	.2	8.3

== Personal life ==
Jefferson's father, Everette, played college basketball at New Mexico.
