= List of Belgian basketball champions =

The Belgian men's basketball champions are the winners of the highest-level basketball league in Belgium, which currently is the BNXT League. This page lists the winners and runners-up over the history of basketball in Belgium.

In the 1979–80 season, playoffs were introduced for the highest level of Belgian basketball.

== Winners ==
| Season | Champions | Score | Runners-up |
|---|---|---|---|
| 1927–28 | Brussels Athletic Club | | |
| 1928–1929 | Daring C.B. | | |
| 1929–1930 | Brussels Athletic Club | | |
| 1930–1931 | Brussels Athletic Club | | |
| 1931–1932 | Daring C.B. | | |
| 1932–1933 | Brussels Athletic Club | | |
| 1933–1934 | Daring C.B. | | |
| 1934–1935 | Amicale Sportive Bruxelles | 2–0 | Sporting Club Liègeois |
| 1935–1936 | Amicale Sportive Bruxelles | 2–0 | Sporting Club Liègeois |
| 1936–1937 | Fresh Air Sc | 2–0 | Sporting Club Liègeois |
| 1937–1938 | Fresh Air | 2–0 | Sporting Club Liègeois |
| 1938–1939 | Anciens IV | 2–0 | Sporting Club Liègeois |
| 1939–1940 | geen competitie | | |
| 1940–1941 | geen competitie | | |
| 1941–1942 | Royal IV | | |
| 1942–1943 | No competition due to World War II | | |
| 1943–1944 | No competition due to World War II | | |
| 1944–1945 | No competition due to World War II | | |
| 1945–1946 | Semailles BC | | |
| 1946–1947 | Semailles BC | | |
| 1947–1948 | Semailles BC | | |
| 1948–1949 | Semailles BC | | |
| 1949–1950 | Semailles BC | | |
| 1950–1951 | Semailles BC | | |
| 1951–1952 | Royal IV | | |
| 1952–1953 | Royal IV | | |
| 1953–1954 | Royal IV | | |
| 1954–1955 | Hellas Gent | | |
| 1955–1956 | Antwerpse B.B.C. | | |
| 1956–1957 | Royal IV | | |
| 1957–1958 | Royal IV | | |
| 1958–1959 | Antwerpse B.B.C. | | |
| 1959–1960 | Antwerpse B.B.C. | | |
| 1960–1961 | Antwerpse B.B.C. | | |
| 1961–1962 | Antwerpse B.B.C. | | |
| 1962–1963 | Antwerpse B.B.C. | | |
| 1963–1964 | Antwerpse B.B.C. | | |
| 1964–1965 | Racing Mechelen | | |
| 1965–1966 | Racing Mechelen | | |
| 1966–1967 | Racing Mechelen | | |
| 1967–1968 | Standard Luik | | |
| 1968–1969 | Racing Bell Mechelen | | |
| 1969–1970 | Standard Luik | | |
| 1970–1971 | Bus Lier | | |
| 1971–1972 | Bus Lier | | |
| 1972–1973 | Racing Ford Antwerpse | | |
| 1973–1974 | Racing Maes Pils Mechelen | | |
| 1974–1975 | Racing Maes Pils Mechelen | | |
| 1975–1976 | Racing Maes Pils Mechelen | | |
| 1976–1977 | Standard Luik | | |
| 1977–1978 | Royal Fresh Air | | |
| 1978–1979 | Royal Fresh Air | | |
| 1979–1980 | Racing Maes Pils Mechelen (7) | 3–1 | Royal Fresh Air |
| 1980–1981 | Sunair Oostende | 3–2 | Racing Maes Pils Mechelen |
| 1981–1982 | Sunair Oostende | 3–2 | Toptours Aarschot |
| 1982–1983 | Sunair Oostende | 3–0 | Racing Maes Pils Mechelen |
| 1983–1984 | Sunair Oostende | 3–1 | Hellas Gent |
| 1984–1985 | Sunair Oostende | 3–0 | Racing Maes Pils Mechelen |
| 1985–1986 | Sunair Oostende | 3–1 | Maccabi Brussel |
| 1986–1987 | Racing Maes Pils Mechelen | 3–1 | Castors Braine |
| 1987–1988 | Sunair Oostende | 3–1 | Castors Braine |
| 1988–1989 | Racing Maes Pils Mechelen | 3–2 | Castors Braine |
| 1989–1990 | Racing Maes Pils Mechelen | 3–2 | Castors Braine |
| 1990–1991 | Racing Maes Pils Mechelen | 3–2 | Sunair Oostende |
| 1991–1992 | Racing Maes Pils Mechelen | 3–2 | Castors Braine |
| 1992–1993 | Racing Maes Pils Mechelen | 3–2 | Spirou Charleroi |
| 1993–1994 | Racing Maes Pils Mechelen | 3–2 | Spirou Charleroi |
| 1994–1995 | Sunair Oostende | 3–2 | Spirou Charleroi |
| 1995–1996 | Spirou Charleroi | 3–0 | Sunair Oostende |
| 1996–1997 | Spirou Charleroi | 3–0 | Sunair Oostende |
| 1997–1998 | Spirou Charleroi | 3–0 | Racing Basket Antwerpen |
| 1998–1999 | Spirou Charleroi | 3–1 | Racing Basket Antwerpen |
| 1999–2000 | Racing Basket Antwerpen | 3-1 | Spirou Charleroi |
| 2000–2001 | Telindus Oostende | 3–0 | Spirou Charleroi |
| 2001–2002 | Telindus Oostende | 3–2 | Spirou Charleroi |
| 2002–2003 | Spirou Charleroi | 3–0 | Royal BC Verviers-Pepinster |
| 2003–2004 | Spirou Charleroi | 3–2 | Liège Basket |
| 2004–2005 | Euphony Bree | 3–1 | Spirou Charleroi |
| 2005–2006 | Telindus Oostende | 3–1 | Dexia Mons-Hainaut |
| 2006–2007 | Telindus Oostende | 3–2 | Euphony Bree |
| 2007–2008 | Spirou Charleroi | 3–0 | Euphony Bree |
| 2008–2009 | Spirou Charleroi | 3–0 | Dexia Mons-Hainaut |
| 2009–2010 | Spirou Charleroi | 3–1 | Liège Basket |
| 2010–2011 | Spirou Charleroi | 3–0 | Okapi Aalstar |
| 2011–2012 | Oostende (12) | 3–2 | Spirou Charleroi |
| 2012–2013 | Oostende (13) | 3–0 | Mons-Hainaut |
| 2013–2014 | Oostende (15) | 3–2 | Okapi Aalstar |
| 2014–2015 | Oostende (16) | 3–1 | Mons-Hainaut |
| 2015–2016 | Oostende (17) | 3–1 | Okapi Aalst |
| 2016–2017 | Oostende (18) | 3–1 | Brussels |
| 2017–2018 | Oostende (19) | 3–0 | Antwerp Giants |
| 2018–2019 | Oostende (20) | 3–1 | Antwerp Giants |
| 2019–2020 | Oostende (21) | – (Note: Not finished because of the COVID-19 pandemic.) | Mons-Hainaut |
| 2020–2021 | Oostende (22) | 3-1 | Mons-Hainaut |
| 2021–22 | Oostende (23) | 3–1 | Kangoeroes Basket Mechelen |
| 2022–23 | Oostende (24) | 3–1 | Antwerp Giants |
| 2023–24 | Oostende (25) | 3–1 | Antwerp Giants |
| 2024–25 | Oostende (26) | 3–1 | Kangoeroes Basket Mechelen |
| 2025–26 | Antwerp Giants (2) | 3–2 | Oostende |

== Performance by club ==
The following table lists all winners and runners-up of the Belgian basketball championship, as well as finals appearances (if possible as these were introduced in 1980). Twelve teams have won the championship, with Oostende holding the record with twenty-six titles. Only three active clubs (Oostende, Antwerp Giants and Spirou) have won a league title.

Teams in bold are currently active in the national top division. Teams in italic have been folded.

| Club | Winners | Runners-up | Finals apps | Pct | Years won | Years runner-up |
|---|---|---|---|---|---|---|
| **Oostende** | 26 | 5 | 31 | .839 | 1981, 1982, 1983, 1984, 1985, 1986, 1988, 1995, 2001, 2002, 2006, 2007, 2012, 2013, 2014, 2015, 2016, 2017, 2018, 2019, 2020, 2021, 2022, 2023, 2024, 2025 | 1991, 1996, 1997, 2000, 2026 |
| Racing Mechelen | 15 | 3 | 11 | .727 | 1965, 1966, 1967, 1969, 1974, 1975, 1976, 1980, 1987, 1989, 1990, 1991, 1992, 1993, 1994 | 1981, 1983, 1985 |
| **Spirou** | 10 | 7 | 17 | .588 | 1996, 1997, 1998, 1999, 2003, 2004, 2008, 2009, 2010, 2011 | 1993, 1994, 1995, 2001, 2002, 2005, 2012 |
| Antwerpse BC | 8 | — | — | — | 1956, 1959, 1960, 1961, 1962, 1963, 1964, 1973 | — |
| Royal IV | 8 | — | — | — | 1939, 1942, 1952, 1953, 1954, 1957, 1958 | — |
| Semailles | 7 | — | — | — | 1946, 1947, 1948, 1949, 1950, 1951 | — |
| Fresh Air | 4 | — | — | — | 1937, 1938, 1978, 1979 | — |
| Brussels AC | 4 | — | — | — | 1928, 1930, 1931, 1933 | — |
| **Antwerp Giants** | 2 | 5 | 7 | .222 | 2000, 2026 | 1998, 1999, 2018, 2019, 2023, 2024 |
| Lier | 2 | — | — | — | 1971, 1972 | — |
| Amicale Sportive | 2 | — | — | — | 1935, 1936 | — |
| Bree | 1 | 2 | 3 | .333 | 2005 | 2007, 2008 |
| **Mons-Hainaut** | — | 6 | 5 (Note: Mons-Hainaut was the runners-up six times, but did not play a play-off final in the 2020–21 season as this season was cancelled early due to the COVID-19 pandemic. However, the league decided that Mons-Hainaut finished second based on their place in the standings.) | .000 | — | 2006, 2009, 2013, 2015, 2020, 2021 |
| Sporting Club Liègeois | – | 5 | — | — | — | 1935, 1936, 1937, 1938, 1939 |
| Castors Braine | — | 5 | 5 | .000 | — | 1987, 1988, 1989, 1990, 1992 |
| **Okapi Aalst** | — | 3 | 3 | .000 | — | 2011, 2014, 2016 |
| **Liège Basket** | — | 2 | 2 | .000 | — | 2004, 2010 |
| **Kangoeroes** | — | 2 | 2 | .000 | — | 2022, 2025 |
| GSG Aarschot | – | 1 | 1 | .000 | — | 1982 |
| Gent Hawks | – | 1 | 1 | .000 | — | 1984 |
| Maccabi Brussels | – | 1 | 1 | .000 | — | 1986 |
| Verviers-Pepinster | — | 1 | 1 | .000 | — | 2003 |
| **Brussels Basketball** | — | 1 | 1 | .000 | — | 2017 |

== Sources ==
- List of Champions in Europe
