= Wen Mukubu =

Congolese-born Belgian basketball player

Filou Oostende
- Title: Assistant coach
- League: BNXT League

Personal information
- Born: 2 August 1983 (age 43) Kinshasa, DR Congo
- Listed height: 2.00 m (6 ft 7 in)
- Listed weight: 216 lb (98 kg)

Career information
- High school: Miami Beach (Miami Beach, Florida)
- College: Arkansas (2002–2004); UAB (2005–2007)
- NBA draft: 2007: undrafted
- Playing career: 2007–2026
- Position: Forward
- Number: 4

Career history

Playing
- 2007–2008: STB Le Havre
- 2009: Sutor Montegranaro
- 2009–2010: SIG Strasbourg
- 2010: Cocodrilos de Caracas
- 2010: Ferrara
- 2010–2011: Pistoia 2000
- 2011: Liège
- 2011–2012: Wolves Verviers-Pepinster
- 2012–2013: Liège
- 2013–2015: Spirou Charleroi
- 2015–2016: BCM Gravelines
- 2016: JA Vichy-Clermont Métropole
- 2016–2021: Limburg United
- 2021–2024: Kangoeroes Mechelen
- 2024–2026: Leuven Bears

Coaching
- 2026–present: Oostende (assistant)

Career highlights
- BNXT Defensive Player of the Year (2023); BNXT Belgian Player of the Year (2022); BNXT League Dream Team (2022)

Wen Boss Mukubu (born 2 August 1983) is a Congolese-born Belgian professional basketball coach and former player who played at the forward position. He has also played for the Belgian national team, with whom he participated at the EuroBasket 2015. He is the current aasistant coach for Coretec Oostende of the BNXT League.

== Professional career ==
In May 2021, Mukubu signed with Kangoeroes Mechelen.

On 6 June 2024 he signed with Leuven Bears of the BNXT League.

== Coaching career ==
On September 1, 2026, he signed with Oostende of the BNXT League as an assistant coach, for starting his coaching career.
