= Vrenz Bleijenbergh =

Belgian basketball player (born 2000)

- Bleijenbergh with Galatasaray in 2026

No. 12 – Galatasaray
- Position: Small forward / power forward
- League: Basketbol Süper Ligi

Personal information
- Born: 14 October 2000 (age 26) Brasschaat, Belgium
- Listed height: 2.11 m (6 ft 11 in)
- Listed weight: 95 kg (209 lb)

Career information
- NBA draft: 2021: undrafted
- Playing career: 2018–present

Career history
- 2018–2021: Antwerp Giants
- 2021–2022: Real Betis
- 2022: Windy City Bulls
- 2022–2023: Oostende
- 2023–2026: Yukatel Merkezefendi
- 2026–present: Galatasaray

Career highlights
- Belgian League champion (2023); BNXT Belgian Finals MVP (2023); BNXT Supercup winner (2022); PBL Rising Star (2021)
Medals
Men's basketball
Representing Belgium
FIBA U20 European Championship Division B
Bronze medal – third place	2019 Portugal	Team
FIBA U18 European Championship Division B
Bronze medal – third place	2018 Macedonia	Team

Vrenz Paul M. Bleijenbergh (born 14 October 2000) is a Belgian professional basketball player for Galatasaray of the Basketbol Süper Ligi (BSL).

== Early life and youth career ==
Bleijenbergh was born in Brasschaat, Belgium. He started playing basketball by the age of four with his local club Ticino Merksem. He played the point guard position in the youth divisions even though he was tall enough to be a power forward.

== Professional career ==
=== Antwerp Giants (2018–2021) ===
In October 2018, Bleijenbergh signed a long-term professional contract with the Antwerp Giants. He turned down college offers from Arizona, Texas Tech and UCLA, among others. Bleijenbergh left secondary school to focus on basketball. He declared for the 2019 NBA draft before withdrawing. In the 2020–21 season, Bleijenbergh became a regular starter with the Antwerp Giants. He was named Pro Basketball League Rising Star at the end of the season.

On 1 June 2021, Bleijenbergh declared for the 2021 NBA draft but went undrafted.

=== Real Betis (2021–2022) ===
On 10 August 2021, Bleijenbergh signed with Real Betis of the Spanish Liga ACB. On 7 February 2022, he terminated his contract with the team.

=== Windy City Bulls (2022) ===
On 26 February 2022, Bleijenbergh was acquired by the Windy City Bulls of the NBA G League. He appeared in three games to finish the 2021–22 NBA G League season.

Bleijenbergh joined the Phoenix Suns for the 2022 NBA Summer League.

=== Oostende (2022–2023) ===
On 1 August 2022, Bleijenbergh signed with Filou Oostende of the BNXT League. On 17 September, he scored 12 points in his Oostende debut during the 2022 BNXT Supercup, which the team won over Heroes Den Bosch. He was the 2023 Belgian League Finals MVP.

=== Yukatel Merkezefendi (2023–2026) ===
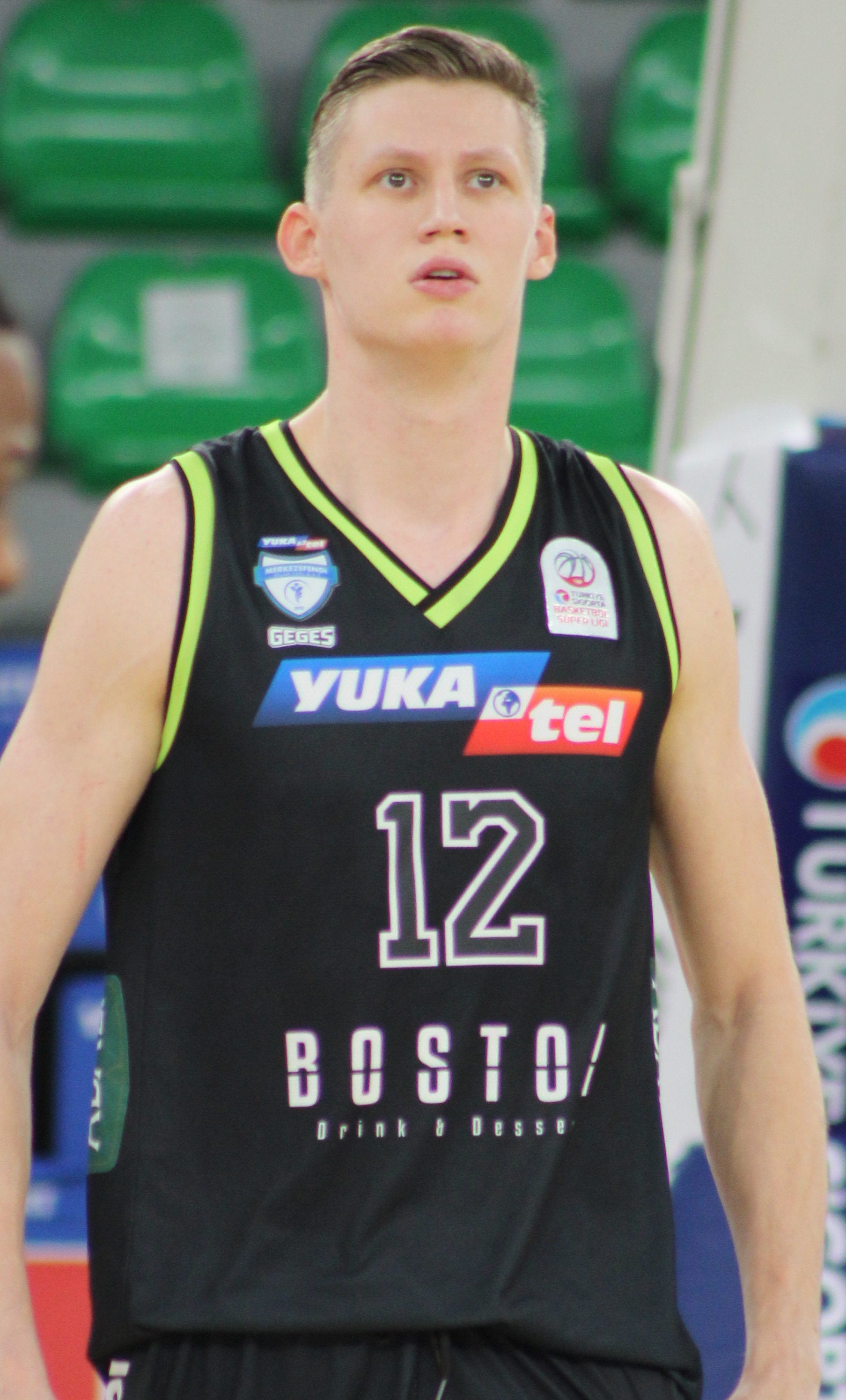
Bleijenbergh with Yukatel Merkezefendi in 2024

On 26 July 2023, Bleijenbergh signed with Yukatel Merkezefendi of the Basketbol Süper Ligi (BSL). He averaged 8.1 points, 6.8 rebounds, 3.3 assists and 1.6 steals per game in 2023–24. He re-signed with the team on 18 July 2024.

On 9 July 2025, Bleijenbergh signed with the South East Melbourne Phoenix of the Australian National Basketball League (NBL) for the 2025–26 season. He was released by the Phoenix on 16 September, prior to the start of the regular season. Bleijenbergh played for the Adelaide 36ers of the NBL at the Pavlos Giannakopoulos Tournament.

On November 13, 2025, Bleijenbergh signed Yukatel Merkezefendi of the Basketbol Süper Ligi (BSL) and completed his return.

=== Galatasaray (2026–present) ===
On July 13, 2026, Bleijenbergh signed with Galatasaray of the Basketbol Süper Ligi (BSL).

== National team career ==
Bleijenbergh has represented Belgium at several youth international tournaments. He averaged 13.5 points, eight rebounds, a tournament-high six assists and two blocks per game at the 2018 FIBA U18 European Championship Division B in Macedonia, leading his team to a bronze medal. He was named to the All-Tournament Team. At the 2019 FIBA U20 European Championship Division B in Portugal, Bleijenbergh averaged 9.3 points, 6.6 rebounds, 5.6 assists and 2.6 steals per game. He led Belgium to another bronze medal and earned All-Tournament Team honors.

On 24 February 2019, Bleijenbergh made his Belgian senior national team debut, scoring three points against Iceland during EuroBasket 2022 Pre-Qualifiers.
