= BNXT League Dream Team =

The BNXT League Dream Team is an annual BNXT League honor bestowed on the best players in the league following every season.

== Teams ==
The player in bold was named the BNXT League Most Valuable Player of the given season.

=== 2021–2024 ===
Season	Pos	Player	Team	Ref.
2021–22	G/F	(United States) Myles Stephens	(Belgium) Kangoeroes Mechelen	
2021–22	SF	(United States) **Levi Randolph**	(Belgium) Filou Oostende	
2021–22	PF	(Netherlands) Emmanuel Nzekwesi	(Belgium) Belfius Mons-Hainaut	
2021–22	C	(Denmark) Asbjørn Midtgaard	(Netherlands) ZZ Leiden	
2021–22	F	(Belgium) Wen Mukubu	(Belgium) Kangoeroes Mechelen	
2022–23	G	(United States) Breein Tyree	(Belgium) Filou Oostende	
2022–23	SG	(United States) **Brian Fobbs**	(Belgium) Kangoeroes Mechelen	
2022–23	PF	(Belgium) Pierre-Antoine Gillet	(Belgium) Filou Oostende	
2022–23	F	(United States) Vincent Cole	(Netherlands) Yoast United	
2022–23	SF	(Belgium) Thijs De Ridder	(Belgium) Telenet Giants Antwerp	
2023–24	PG	(Puerto Rico) Ángel Rodríguez	(Belgium) Liège Basket	
2023–24	PG	(United States) Rasir Bolton	(Belgium) Antwerp Giants	
2023–24	PF	(Belgium) Pierre-Antoine Gillet	(Belgium) Filou Oostende	
2023–24	SF	(United States) **Damien Jefferson**	(Belgium) Filou Oostende	
2023–24	F/C	(Serbia) Nikola Jovanović	(Belgium) Antwerp Giants	

=== 2024–2025 season ===
Beginning with the 2024–25 season, two teams have been announced each year instead of just one.

Season	First team		Second team		Ref.
Season	Players	Teams	Players	Teams	Ref.
2024–25	(United States) Trenton Gibson	(Belgium) Kangoeroes Basket Mechelen	(United States) TreVion Crews	(Netherlands) Den Helder Suns	
2024–25	(United States) Eric Reed Jr.	(Belgium) House of Talents Spurs	(United States) Michael Flowers	(Belgium) Windrose Giants Antwerp	
2024–25	(United States) **Timmy Allen**	(Belgium) Filou Oostende	(United States) Samuell Williamson	(Netherlands) Heroes Den Bosch	
2024–25	(United States) Aundre Hyatt	(Belgium) Kangoeroes Basket Mechelen	(Czech Republic) James Karnik	(Netherlands) Donar Groningen	
2024–25	(Belgium) Niels De Ridder	(Belgium) House of Talents Spurs	(Netherlands) Shaquille Doorson	(Netherlands) LWD Basket	

=== 2025–present ===
Following the 2025–26 season, the award began to be presented again to a single team.

Season	Pos	Player	Team	Ref.
2025–26	G	(United States) **Dante Maddox Jr.**	(Belgium) Okapi Aalst	
2025–26	G	(United States) Rasheed Bello	(Belgium) Windrose Antwerp Giants	
2025–26	PG	(United States) Enoch Cheeks	(Belgium) Windrose Antwerp Giants	
2025–26	SF	(United States) Tytan Anderson	(Belgium) Filou Oostende	
2025–26	F	(Sweden) Zaba Bangala	(Belgium) Kangoeroes Mechelen	
