= Thijs De Ridder =

Belgian basketball player (born 2003)

No. 28 – Virginia Cavaliers
- Position: Power forward / small forward
- League: Atlantic Coast Conference

Personal information
- Born: 31 January 2003 (age 23) Brasschaat, Belgium
- Listed height: 6 ft 9 in (2.06 m)
- Listed weight: 238 lb (108 kg)

Career information
- College: Virginia (2025–present)
- Playing career: 2020–present

Career history
- 2020–2023: Antwerp Giants
- 2023–2025: Bilbao Basket

Career highlights
- FIBA Europe Cup champion (2025); All-Liga ACB Young Players Team (2025); BNXT League Dream Team (2023); BNXT League Sixth Man of the Year (2023); BNXT Belgian Rising Star of the Year (2023); Belgian Cup winner (2023); First-team All-ACC (2026); ACC All-Rookie team (2026)

Thijs De Ridder (/tɛs/ TESS; born 31 January 2003) is a Belgian college basketball player for the Virginia Cavaliers of the Atlantic Coast Conference (ACC). He played formerly for Surne Bilbao Basket in Spain's Liga Endesa. In 2023, he won two awards at the BNXT Awards: Rising Star and Sixth Man. His brother Niels De Ridder also plays basketball professionally.

== College career ==
As a freshman, de Ridder averaged 15.6 points and 6.2 rebounds per game. He was named to the First Team All-ACC and helped lead Virginia to the second round of the NCAA Tournament. Coming into his sophomore season, de Ridder was named Preseason ACC Player of the Year.
