= Osun Osunniyi =

American basketball player (born 1998)

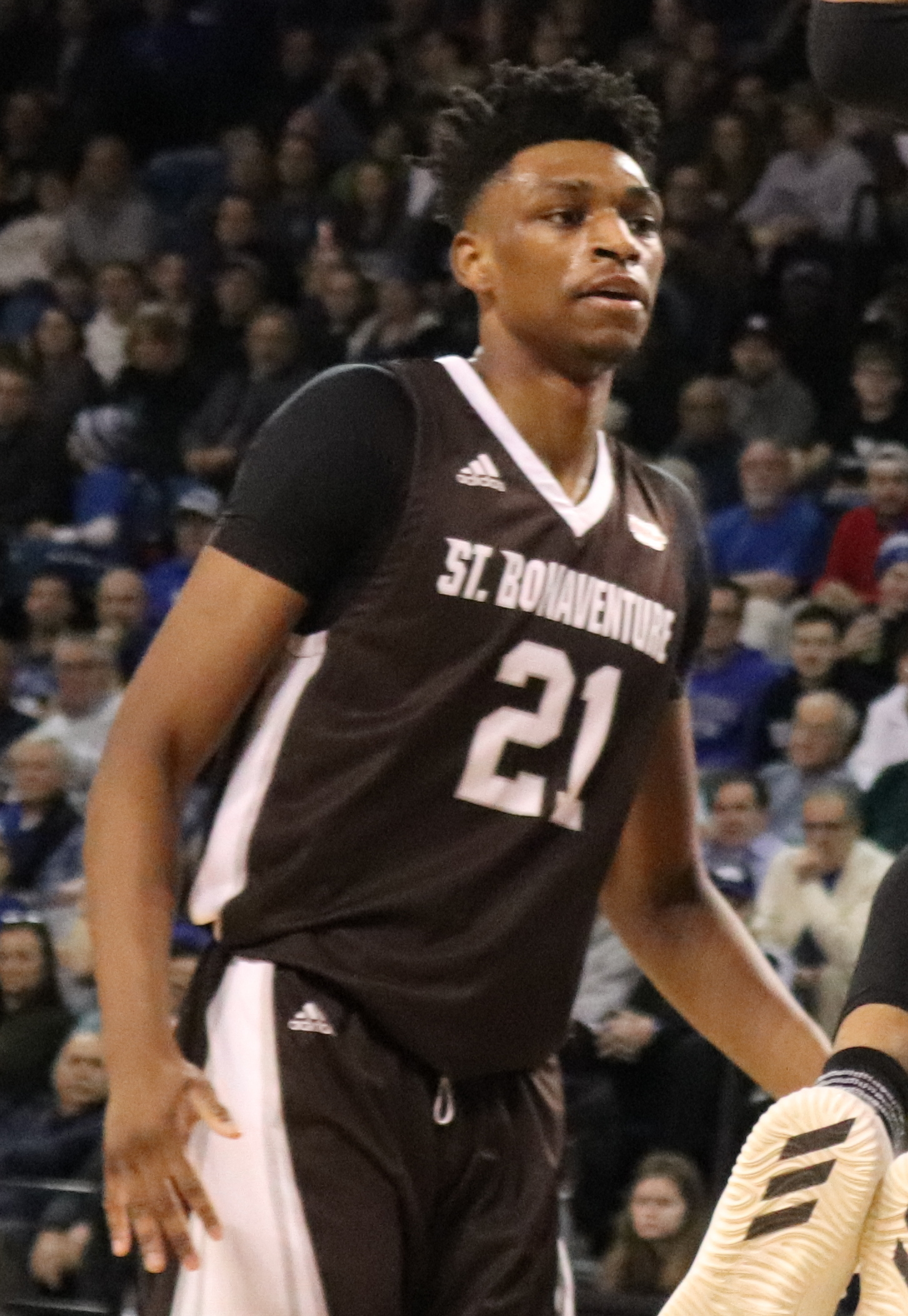
- Osunniyi with St. Bonaventure in 2019

No. 23 – Dziki Warsaw
- Position: Power forward / center
- League: PLK

Personal information
- Born: October 21, 1998 (age 28)
- Listed height: 6 ft 10 in (2.08 m)
- Listed weight: 220 lb (100 kg)

Career information
- High school: Mainland (Linwood, New Jersey); Putnam Science Academy (Putnam, Connecticut)
- College: St. Bonaventure (2018–2022); Iowa State (2022–2023)
- NBA draft: 2023: undrafted
- Playing career: 2023–present

Career history
- 2023–2024: Hubo Limburg United
- 2024–2026: MLP Academics Heidelberg
- 2026–present: Dziki Warsaw

Career highlights
- Belgian Cup MVP (2024); Belgian Cup winner (2024); BNXT Defensive Player of the Year (2024); 2× Second-team All-Atlantic 10 (2021, 2022); Third-team All-Atlantic 10 (2020); 2× Atlantic 10 Defensive Player of the Year (2021, 2022); 4× Atlantic 10 All-Defensive Team (2019–2022); Atlantic 10 All-Rookie Team (2019); Atlantic 10 tournament MOP (2021)

Osun Bowale Osunniyi (born October 21, 1998) is an American basketball player for Dziki Warsaw of the Polish Basketball League (PLK). He played college basketball for the St. Bonaventure Bonnies and Iowa State Cyclones.

== High school career ==
Osunniyi started playing basketball in eighth grade, after moving from Pleasantville, New Jersey to Somers Point. He attended Mainland Regional High School in Linwood, New Jersey, joining the varsity team as a junior and starting for the first time in his senior year. His coach, Dan Williams, considered him an NCAA Division III prospect before he grew three inches (7.6 cm) prior to his senior season. Osunniyi played a postgraduate season at Putnam Science Academy in Putnam, Connecticut. He led his team to the National Prep Championship, where he was named MVP of the title game. He initially committed to playing college basketball for La Salle before switching his commitment to St. Bonaventure. He turned down offers from traditional basketball powers, such as Syracuse and Georgetown.

== College career ==
As a freshman at St. Bonaventure, Osunniyi averaged 7.5 points, 7.6 rebounds and 2.6 blocks per game. He led all NCAA Division I freshmen and ranked sixth in the nation in blocks. He was named to the Atlantic 10 All-Rookie and All-Defensive teams. As a sophomore, Osunniyi averaged 10.8 points, 8.4 rebounds and 2.5 blocks per game. He earned Third Team All-Atlantic 10 and All-Defensive Team honors. In his junior season, Osunniyi was a Second Team All-Atlantic 10 selection and Atlantic 10 Defensive Player of the Year. He recorded 14 points, 12 rebounds and three blocks in a 74–65 win over VCU at the Atlantic 10 tournament final. He was named tournament most outstanding player. As a junior, Osunniyi averaged 10.7 points, 9.4 rebounds, and 2.9 blocks per game. He was again named to the Second Team All-Atlantic 10 as a senior as well as Defensive Player of the Year.

On May 5, 2022, Osunniyi announced he was transferring to Iowa State University.

== Professional career ==
On June 23, 2023, Osunniyi signed to play with the Washington Wizards in the NBA Summer League in Las Vegas, but did not make the Wizards' roster. On July 21, 2023, Osunniyi signed with Limburg United of the BNXT League.

On June 19, 2024, Osunniyi signed with MLP Academics Heidelberg of the Basketball Bundesliga.

On July 12, 2026, he signed with Dziki Warsaw of the Polish Basketball League (PLK).

== Career statistics ==
Legend
| GP | Games played | GS | Games started | MPG | Minutes per game |
| FG% | Field goal percentage | 3P% | 3-point field goal percentage | FT% | Free throw percentage |
| RPG | Rebounds per game | APG | Assists per game | SPG | Steals per game |
| BPG | Blocks per game | PPG | Points per game | **Bold** | Career high |

=== College ===
| Year | Team | GP | GS | MPG | FG% | 3P% | FT% | RPG | APG | SPG | BPG | PPG |
|---|---|---|---|---|---|---|---|---|---|---|---|---|
| 2018–19 | St. Bonaventure | **34** | 21 | 27.2 | .571 | – | .667 | 7.6 | .8 | .5 | 2.7 | 7.5 |
| 2019–20 | St. Bonaventure | 24 | 19 | 30.0 | **.615** | – | .576 | 8.4 | 1.2 | .7 | 2.4 | 10.8 |
| 2020–21 | St. Bonaventure | 21 | 21 | **34.3** | .571 | .000 | **.681** | **9.4** | **2.4** | **.8** | **2.9** | 10.7 |
| 2021–22 | St. Bonaventure | 32 | **32** | 30.6 | .613 | **.500** | .641 | 7.5 | 1.5 | .5 | **2.9** | **11.3** |
| 2022–23 | Iowa State | 33 | 29 | 18.3 | .577 | .231 | .672 | 3.9 | 1.1 | .4 | 1.1 | 8.2 |
| Career | | 144 | 122 | 27.4 | .591 | .250 | .648 | 7.1 | 1.3 | .6 | 2.4 | 9.5 |

== Personal life ==
Osunniyi is of Nigerian descent. His name, Osun Bowale, translates to "angel of love and fertility has returned home."
