= Brian Fobbs =

American basketball player (born 1998)

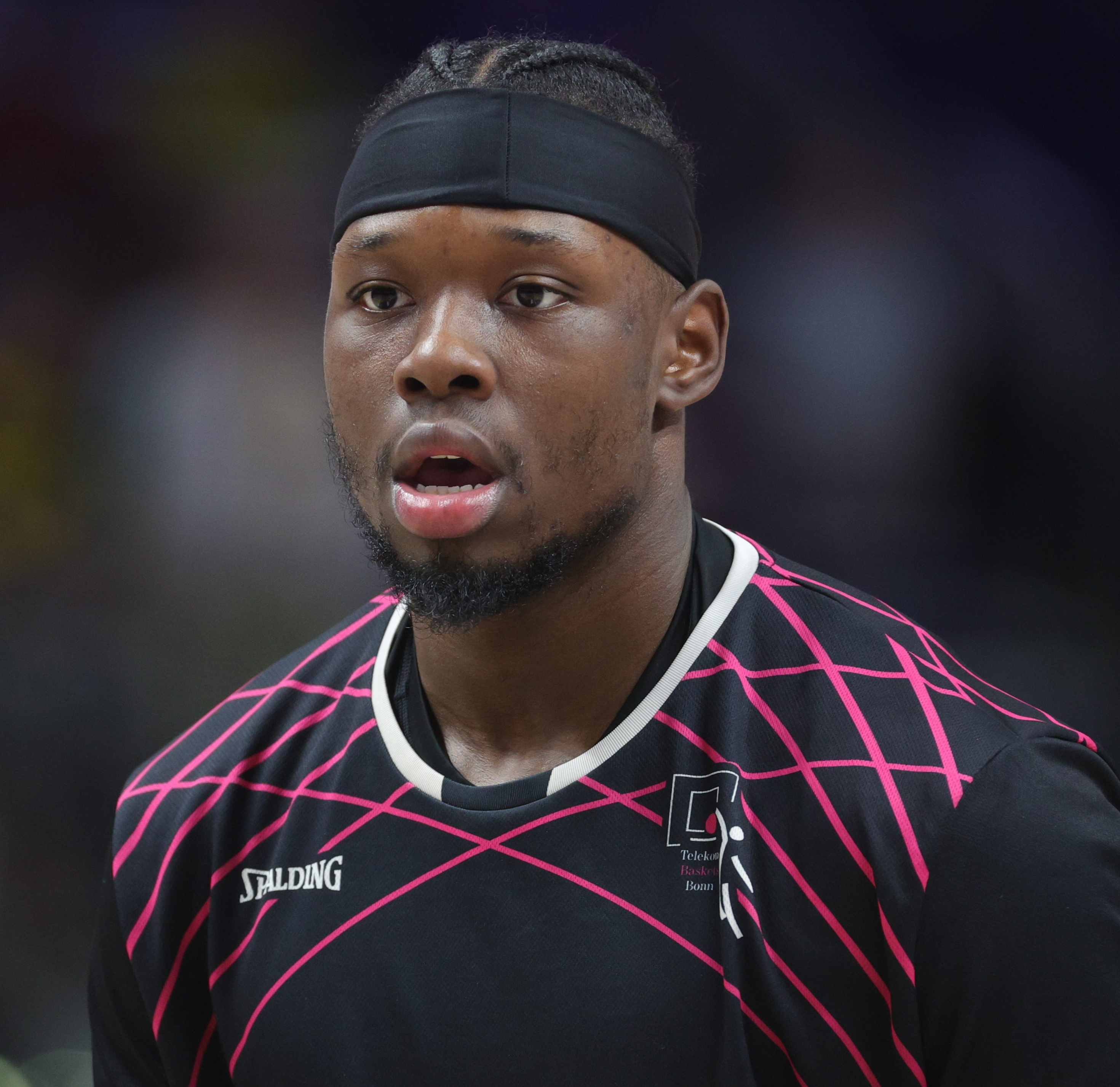

No. 4 – EWE Baskets Oldenburg
- Position: Shooting guard
- League: Basketball Bundesliga

Personal information
- Born: February 17, 1998 (age 28)
- Listed height: 6 ft 5 in (1.96 m)
- Listed weight: 210 lb (95 kg)

Career information
- High school: Bishop Kearney (Irondequoit, New York)
- College: Genesee CC (2016–2018); Towson (2018–2020)
- NBA draft: 2020: undrafted
- Playing career: 2021–present

Career history
- 2021–2022: Vilpas Vikings
- 2022–2023: Kangoeroes Mechelen
- 2023–2024: Telekom Baskets Bonn
- 2024–2025: Dinamo Sassari
- 2025–present: EWE Baskets Oldenburg

Career highlights
- BNXT League MVP (2023); BNXT League Dream Team (2023); 2x Second-team All-CAA (2019, 2020)

Brian Fobbs (born February 17, 1998) is an American professional basketball player for EWE Baskets Oldenburg in the Basketball Bundesliga (BBL). He played college basketball for Genesee Community College and Towson.

== High school career ==
Fobbs attended Bishop Kearney High School in Irondequoit, New York. He was not the featured player on offense as a junior, averaging about seven points per game. As a senior, Fobbs averaged 10 points per game. He did not receive any notable collegiate offers, so he committed to Genesee Community College.

== College career ==
As a sophomore at Genesee, Fobbs averaged 26.4 points and 12.7 rebounds per game. He had nine games in which he scored 30 or more points, including a single-game program record of 46 points. Fobbs was named a NJCAA Division II First Team All-American.

He signed with Towson over an offer from Robert Morris. On December 11, 2018, he scored 32 points in an 80–76 overtime win against UMBC, including the game-winning three-pointer with 10.4 seconds left. Fobbs averaged 17.5 points and 5.9 rebounds per game as a junior, earning Second Team All-CAA honors. On December 10, 2019, he scored a career-high 33 points and hit seven three-pointers in a 77–71 win against UMBC. As a senior, Fobbs averaged 16.3 points and 4.9 rebounds per game. He was again named to the Second Team All-CAA. Fobbs finished his career with 1,083 points at Towson, becoming the first junior college transfer to score over 1,000 points since 1978.

== Professional career ==
On September 13, 2021, Fobbs signed his first professional contract with the Vilpas Vikings of the Korisliiga.

On July 12, 2022, he has signed with Kangoeroes Mechelen of the BNXT League.

On June 19, 2024, he signed with Dinamo Sassari of the Lega Basket Serie A (LBA).

On August 13, 2025, he signed with EWE Baskets Oldenburg in the Basketball Bundesliga (BBL).

== Personal life ==
Fobbs is the son of Joseph and Monica Fobbs. He has a sister, Briana. Fobbs cites LeBron James as his role model.
