= BNXT League Coach of the Year =

The BNXT League Coach of the Year award is given annually at the end of the regular season of the BNXT League, which is the highest professional basketball league in Belgium and the Netherlands. This award is given to the coach who has achieved the most outstanding results with the talent at his disposal. This award will be given to both a Belgian and a Dutch coach.

The current award, given by the BNXT League, began when the BNTX League started (with the 2021–22 season).

Beginning with the 2024–25 season, only one coach of the year have been announced each year instead of two separate coaches from both countries.

== BNXT League Coach of the Year winners (2022–present) ==
^	Denotes coach who is still active in the BNXT League
*	Inducted into the FIBA Hall of Fame
†	Denotes coach whose team won championship that year
Player (X)	Denotes the number of times the Coach has been named Coach of the Year
Team (X)	Denotes the number of times a coach from this team has won

- Coach nationalities by national team:

Season	Country	Coach	Nationality	Team	Ref.
2021–22	Belgium	Kristof Michiels^	Belgium	(Belgium) Kangoeroes Mechelen	
2021–22	Netherlands	Geert Hammink	Netherlands	(Netherlands) ZZ Leiden	
2022–23	Belgium	Ivica Skelin	Belgium	(Belgium) Telenet Giants Antwerp	
2022–23	Netherlands	Doug Spradley^	Netherlands	(Netherlands) ZZ Leiden (2)	
2023–24	Belgium	Dario Gjergja	Belgium	(Belgium) Filou Oostende	
2023–24	Netherlands	Radenko Varagić^	Netherlands	(Netherlands) BAL	
2024–25	–	Johan Roijakkers^	Belgium	(Belgium) House of Talents Spurs	
2025–26	–	Olivier Foucart^	Belgium	(Belgium) Okapi Aalst	
