= Doug Spradley =

American-German basketball player and coach

Hapoel Be'er Sheva
- Position: Head coach
- League: Israeli Basketball Premier League

Personal information
- Born: September 14, 1966 (age 60) Tacoma, Washington
- Listed height: 6 ft 4 in (1.93 m)

Career information
- College: Gonzaga (1985–1989)
- Playing career: 1989–2001

Career history

Playing
- 1989–1992: Canadians Amsterdam
- 1992–1996: Paderborn
- 1996–1998: SG Braunschweig
- 1998–2000: SSV Weißenfels
- 2000–2001: Paderborn

Coaching
- 2001–2009: Paderborn
- 2009–2013: Bremerhaven
- 2014–2016: Würzburg
- 2017–2018: Rasta Vechta
- 2019–2020: Tigers Tübingen
- 2022–2026: ZZ Leiden
- 2026–present: Hapoel Be'er Sheva

Career highlights
- As head coach: 2× German Second Division champion (2006, 2017–18); BNXT League champion (2023); 2× Dutch League champion (2023, 2024); Dutch Cup winner (2023); 2× Dutch Supercup winner (2023, 2024); BNXT Dutch Coach of the Year (2023)

Douglas "Doug" Spradley (born September 14, 1966) is an American-German professional basketball coach, and former professional player. He is currently the head coach of Hapoel Be'er Sheva in the Israeli Basketball Premier League, appointed on August 20, 2026, ahead of the 2026–27 season. Spradley has previously won the 2. Basketball Bundesliga in 2006 with Paderborn, and in 2018 with Rasta Vechta. He coached ZZ Leiden to the triple crown (BNXT League champion, Dutch champion, Dutch Cup winner) in 2023.

== Playing career ==
Spradley played college basketball at Gonzaga University (1986–89), where he earned West Coast Conference First team honors in 1987-88 and 1988-89 as well as Honorable Mention status in 1986-87. He amassed 1,427 points during his GU career and became a member of Gonzaga's 40 Point Club after scoring 40 points against Loyola Marymount on February 18, 1989.

Coming out of college in 1989, Spradley signed with the Amsterdam Canadians, a professional basketball team from the Netherlands. He spent three years with the club, before accepting an offer from the Paderborn Baskets of Germany. He helped the team earn promotion to Germany's top-flight Basketball Bundesliga in 1994. He left Paderborn in 1996 and spent two years at SG Braunschweig, followed by another two years at SSV Weißenfels before rounding out his playing days with the Paderborn team in the 2000-01 season.

== Coaching career ==
Following his playing career, Spradley took over as head coach of the Paderborn Baskets in 2001. In 2005-06, he led Paderborn to an undefeated season, which resulted in winning the 2. Bundesliga championship and gaining promotion to the first German division. In 2009, Spradley left Paderborn after eight years at the helm to take on a new challenge at Eisbären Bremerhaven. During his four-year tenure, he guided Bremerhaven to the Bundesliga semifinals in 2010 and to the quarterfinals one year later. Spradley parted company with the Eisbären organization at the conclusion of the 2012-13 campaign.

In May 2014, he was appointed as the new head coach of s.Oliver Würzburg. In his first year at the helm, Spradley steered the team to promotion to Germany's top tier. In 2015-16, he coached Würzburg to a quarterfinal appearance in the Bundesliga playoffs. On December 30, 2016, he was sacked by s.Oliver Würzburg after seven defeats in ten games.

On February 8, 2017, struggling Bundesliga side SC Rasta Vechta announced the appointment of Doug Spradley as head coach, but could not avoid relegation from the German top tier. In the 2017-18 season, he led Vechta to the ProA championship and thus to promotion to the Bundesliga. He parted ways with Vechta at the end of the campaign.

Spradley was named head coach of German ProA team Tigers Tübingen prior to the 2019-20 season. He was sacked on January 1, 2020. Under Spradley's guidance, Tübingen won eight of 16 games.

After the Tigers, he went on to have a sabbatical of two years. On August 14, 2022, Spradley signed a one-year contract with current BNXT League champion ZZ Leiden from the Netherlands. On 12 March 2023, he won the Dutch Basketball Cup with Leiden after defeating Landstede Hammers in the final and added a Dutch championship in May 2023. In June 2023, he completed another championship run with his Leiden team by winning the BNXT League. Spradley won a second Dutch championship in 2024.

== Personal life ==
Spradley was granted German citizenship in 1998. He has two children with his German wife Tanja.
