= Shaquille Doorson =

Dutch basketball players

Free Agent
- Position: Center

Personal information
- Born: 26 February 1994 (age 32) Amsterdam, Netherlands
- Listed height: 2.13 m (7 ft 0 in)
- Listed weight: 125 kg (276 lb)

Career information
- College: Rutgers (2014–2019)
- NBA draft: 2019: undrafted
- Playing career: 2013–present

Career history
- 2013: Apollo Amsterdam
- 2019–2020: Marín Peixegalego
- 2020: Melilla
- 2020–2021: Rapla
- 2021–2024: Aris Leeuwarden
- 2024: Montreal Alliance
- 2024–2025: LWD Basket

Career highlights
- BNXT Dutch Player of the Year (2025); BNXT Defensive Player of the Year (2025); BNXT League Second Team (2025); 2× BNXT League blocks leader (2022, 2025)

Shaquille Doorson (born 26 February 1994) is a Dutch basketball player who last played for LWD Basket of the BNXT League. Standing at 2.13 m (7 ft 0 in), he plays as center. Having played collegiate for Rutgers, he played for several pro teams in Spain, Estonia and the Netherlands.

Doorson also played for the Netherlands national team as he made his debut in 2025.

== Early life and career ==
Born in Amsterdam, Doorson started playing basketball at the age of 18, after playing football before. He joined the Under-20 team of Apollo Amsterdam. In the 2012–13 season, he made his debut with Apollo's senior team in the Dutch Basketball League, playing two games. He made his DBL debut on 30 March 2013, playing 14 minutes in a loss against Den Bosch. Later, he moved to Spain to join the Canarias Basketball Academy.

== College career ==
Doorson was scouted in Spain by Rutgers and joined the team in 2014. In his second season, he suffered a foot injury and was sidelined for the entire season. In his senior year, he started in all 31 games for the Scarlet Knights and averaged 3.7 points and 4.3 rebounds per game.

== Professional career ==
In July 2019, Doorson signed his first professional contract with Marín Peixegalego in the Spanish LEB Oro. He averaged 6.6 points and 5.6 rebounds over 24 games.

Doorson started the 2020–21 season with Melilla, also in the LEB Oro. In November, he agreed with the team to terminate his contract after appearing in four games.

In December 2020, Doorson transferred to Estonian club Rapla. He averaged 7.6 points and 5.4 rebounds in the LEBL.

On 9 July 2021, Doorson signed with Aris Leeuwarden of the BNXT League, marking his return to his native country.

== National team career ==
In February 2025, Doorson made his debut with the Netherlands national team, becoming the first LWD Basket to be selected in club history. He made his debut on February 24, 2025, in a 53–63 loss to Greece, and scored 6 points in the game.

== Career statistics ==
Year	Team	League	GP	MPG	PPG	RPG	APG
2012–13	Apollo Amsterdam	DBL	2	11.0	1.0	1.5	.0
2019–20	Marín Peixegalego	LEB Oro	24	21.7	6.6	5.6	.3
2020–21	Mellila	LEB Oro	4	16.5	4.0	4.0	.0
2020–21	Rapla	LEBL	14	20.2	7.6	5.4	1.2

== Personal ==
Doorson was named after Basketball Hall of Famer Shaquille O'Neal.
