= BNXT League Defensive Player of the Year =

The BNXT League Defensive Player of the Year award is given annually at the end of the regular season of the BNXT League, the highest professional basketball league in Belgium and the Netherlands, to the player who has excelled defensively throughout the season.

The current award, given by the BNXT League, began when that league started, with the 2021–22 season.

== BNXT League Defensive Player of the Year winners (2022–present) ==
^	Denotes player who is still active in the BNXT League
*	Inducted into the FIBA Hall of Fame
†	Denotes player whose team won championship that year
Player (X)	Denotes the number of times the player has been named Defensive Player of the Year
Team (X)	Denotes the number of times a player from this team has won

- Player nationalities by national team:

Season	Player	Pos.	Nationality	Team	Ref.
2021–22	Worthy de Jong	G/F	Netherlands	(Netherlands) ZZ Leiden	
2022–23	Wen Mukubu^	F	Belgium	(Belgium) Kangoeroes Mechelen	
2023–24	Osun Osunniyi	F	United States	(Belgium) Limburg United	
2024–25	Shaquille Doorson	C	Netherlands	(Netherlands) LWD Basket	
2025–26	Enoch Cheeks^	PG	United States	(Belgium) Windrose Antwerp Giants	
