= BNXT League Player of the Year =

The BNXT League Player of the Year award is given annually at the end of the regular season of the BNXT League, the highest professional basketball league in Belgium and the Netherlands, to the best player from Belgium and the Netherlands.

The current award, given by the BNXT League, began when that league started, with the 2021–22 season.

== BNXT League Player of the Year winners (2022–present) ==
^	Denotes player who is still active in the BNXT League
*	Inducted into the FIBA Hall of Fame
†	Denotes player whose team won championship that year
Player (X)	Denotes the number of times the player has been named Player of the Year
Team (X)	Denotes the number of times a player from this team has won

- Player nationalities by national team:

Season	Country	Player	Pos.	Nationality	Team	Ref.
2021–22	Belgium	Wen Mukubu^	F	Belgium	(Belgium) Kangoeroes Mechelen	
2021–22	Netherlands	Worthy de Jong	G/F	Netherlands	(Netherlands) ZZ Leiden	
2022–23	Belgium	Pierre-Antoine Gillet^	PF	Belgium	(Belgium) Filou Oostende	
2022–23	Netherlands	Thomas van der Mars	C	Netherlands	(Netherlands) Heroes Den Bosch	
2023–24	Belgium	Pierre-Antoine Gillet^ (2)	PF	Belgium	(Belgium) Filou Oostende (2)	
2023–24	Netherlands	Marijn Ververs^	G	Netherlands	(Netherlands) ZZ Leiden (2)	
2024–25	Belgium	Niels De Ridder^	PF	Belgium	(Belgium) House of Talents Spurs	
2024–25	Netherlands	Shaquille Doorson	C	Netherlands	(Netherlands) LWD Basket	
2025–26	Belgium	Niels Van Den Eynde^	G	Belgium	(Belgium) Okapi Aalst	
2025–26	Netherlands	Marijn Ververs^ (2)	PG	Netherlands	(Belgium) Limburg United	
