= Radenko Varagić =

Serbian-Dutch basketball coach

ZZ Leiden
- Position: Head coach
- League: BNXT League

Personal information
- Born: 23 September 1973 (age 53) Belgrade, Serbia

Career history

Coaching
- 2007: Serbia Men U20 (assistant)
- 2012–2013: Serbia Women U20
- 2019–present: Netherlands Men U16
- 2016–2017: BSW
- 2017–2026: BAL
- 2022–2023: Netherlands (interim head coach)
- 2026–present: ZZ Leiden

Career highlights
- As coach: BNXT Dutch Coach of the Year (2024); Dutch Cup champion (2021)
Medals
Men's basketball
Assistant Coach for Serbia
U20 European Championship
Gold medal – first place	2007 Italy / Slovenia	Team

Radenko Varagić (born 23 September 1973) is a Serbian Dutch basketball coach. He currently serves as a head coach for ZZ Leiden of the BNXT League.

== Coaching career ==
Born in Serbia, Varagić started his coaching career in 2005 with Ribnica and during 2007 to 2011, he worked for Kraljevo, Krusevac and Novi Sad.

After a period in the youth academy of Red Star Belgrade, he moved to the Netherlands in 2014. On 13 September 2016, Varagić was appointed as head coach of BSW of the Dutch Basketball League (DBL). After the 2016–17 season, the club went bankrupt and was replaced by BAL, as he took over as head coach of the club's new DBL team.

In the 2020–21 season, he coached BAL to their first playoffs appearance after finishing in eighth place. On 2 May 2021, Varagić won the 2021 DBL Cup with his team after beating Yoast United in the final.

On 6 October 2022, Varagic was appointed as interim head coach of the Netherlands national team after the firing of Maurizio Buscaglia. He was already coaching Netherlands U-16 since 2019.

On 15 April 2026, BAL announced that Varagic will be head coach of ZZ Leiden.

== Personal ==
Varagić received the Dutch nationality in 2022. He is married to Vesna and has three children.

== Coaching record ==
=== Dutch Basketball League ===
Team	Year	G	W	L	W–L%	Result
BSW	2016–17	28	4	24	.143	
BAL	2017–18	28	4	24	.143	
BAL	2018–19	34	5	29	.147	
BAL	2019–20	24	9	15	.375	
BAL	2020–21	21	12	9	.571	Quarterfinalist
Career		135	34	101	.252	
