= Tommy Rutherford =

American basketball player

No. 42 – MHP Riesen Ludwigsburg
- Position: Center
- League: BBL

Personal information
- Born: January 9, 1997 (age 29) San Diego, California, U.S.
- Listed height: 6 ft 8.3 in (2.04 m)
- Listed weight: 240 lb (109 kg)

Career information
- High school: Grossmont (El Cajon, California)
- College: UC Irvine (2016–2020)
- NBA draft: 2020: undrafted
- Playing career: 2020–present

Career history
- 2020–2021: Racing Luxembourg
- 2021–2022: Starwings Basel
- 2022–2023: ZZ Leiden
- 2023–2024: Neptūnas Klaipėda
- 2024: South Bay Lakers
- 2025: Motor City Cruise
- 2025–2026: BC Kalev
- 2026: Jonava Hipocredit
- 2026–present: Riesen Ludwigsburg

Career highlights
- BNXT League champion (2023); BNXT Dutch Finals MVP (2023); Dutch League champion (2023); Dutch Cup winner (2023); First-team All-Big West (2018); Big West Hustle Player of The Year (2019)

Thomas Rutherford (born January 9, 1997) is an American professional basketball player for Riesen Ludwigsburg of the Basketball Bundesliga (BBL). Listed at 6 feet 8.3 inches (2.04 m) and 240 pounds (109 kg), he plays the center position. He played college basketball for the UC Irvine Anteaters.

== College career ==
After graduating Grossmont High School, Rutherford played with the UC Irvine Anteaters men's basketball team from 2016 to 2020. He was a first-team All-Big West in 2018.

== Professional career ==
Rutherford started his professional career in 2020, when he played his rookie season with Racing Luxembourg in the Luxembourg League. He averaged a double-double of 19.7 points and a league-leading 16.5 rebounds per game.

In the 2021–22 season, Rutherford played in Switzerland for Starwings Basel. He averaged 15.3 points and a league-leading 11.4 rebounds per game in the Swiss Basketball League (SBL).

On August 22, 2022, Rutherford signed with Dutch club ZZ Leiden of the BNXT League. With Leiden, he won the Dutch Cup, Dutch League and BNXT championship in the 2022–23 season. In Game 5 of the Dutch League finals, Rutherford scored the decisive two free-throws that sealed Leiden's fifth national title. He was also named Dutch Finals MVP after the series.

On August 2, 2023, Rutherford signed with Neptūnas Klaipėda of the Lithuanian Basketball League (LKL).

On October 26, 2024, Rutherford joined the Santa Cruz Warriors after being selected in the 2024 NBA G League draft. However, he was waived on November 6 and on December 6, he joined the South Bay Lakers, but was waived on December 13.

On January 11, 2025, Rutherford joined the Motor City Cruise.

On August 13, 2025, it was announced that Rutherford will join Estonian club Kalev of the Korvpalli Meistriliiga for the 2025–26 season.

On February 24, 2026, Rutherford signed with Jonava Hipocredit of the Lithuanian Basketball League (LKL).

On August 24, 2026, Rutherford signed a contract with Riesen Ludwigsburg of the Basketball Bundesliga (BBL).

== Personal life ==
Rutherford has an older brother and an older sister. He studied civil engineering at the University of California, Irvine.
