= Rasheed Bello =

American basketball player (born 2003)

- Bello with Virtus Bologna in 2026

No. 0 – Virtus Bologna
- Position: Point guard
- League: LBA; EuroLeague

Personal information
- Born: July 21, 2003 (age 23) Chicago, Illinois, U.S.
- Listed height: 183 cm (6 ft 0 in)
- Listed weight: 94 kg (207 lb)

Career information
- High school: DePaul College Prep (Chicago, Illinois)
- College: Parkside Rangers (2021–2023); Purdue Fort Wayne (2023–2025)
- NBA draft: 2025: undrafted
- Playing career: 2025–present

Career history
- 2025–2026: Antwerp Giants
- 2026–present: Virtus Bologna

Career highlights
- BNXT League champion (2026); Belgian Cup winner (2026); BNXT Belgian Finals MVP (2026); BNXT League Dream Team (2026); All-Horizon League First Team (2025); All-Horizon League Freshman Team (2025)

Rasheed Bello (born 21 July, 2003) is an American professional basketball player for Virtus Bologna of the Italian Lega Basket Serie A (LBA) and the EuroLeague. He played college basketball for the Parkside Rangers and Purdue Fort Wayne.

== College career ==
Bello started his collegiate career at the University of Wisconsin–Parkside, where he played for the Rangers in NCAA Division II. During his freshman season, he was named GLIAC Freshman of the Year, quickly establishing himself as one of the conference's top young guards. He continued his development over the following season, earning GLIAC Player of the Year honors thanks to his all-around production and defensive impact.

Ahead of the 2023–24 season, Bello transferred to Purdue University Fort Wayne, joining the Mastodons in NCAA Division I. In his lone season with the program, he became one of the Horizon League's most productive guards, leading the conference in steals while averaging double figures in scoring and ranking among the league leaders in assists. His performances earned him All-Horizon League First Team recognition and attracted the attention of European professional clubs.

== Professional career ==
=== Antwerp Giants (2025–2026) ===
In 2025, Bello signed his first professional contract with the Antwerp Giants of the BNXT League. He immediately emerged as one of the league's premier guards, averaging around 17 points and more than five assists per game while showcasing his scoring ability, transition play, and perimeter defense. Bello played a key role in one of the most successful seasons in Antwerp's recent history. He helped the Giants capture the BNXT League championship, ending Filou Oostende's long domestic dominance, and was named BNXT League Finals MVP after leading his team throughout the championship series. Antwerp also won the Belgian Basketball Cup, completing a historic campaign.

=== Virtus Bologna (2026–present) ===
On July 3, 2026, Bello signed a multi-year contract with Virtus Bologna, of the Italian Lega Basket Serie A (LBA) and the EuroLeague.
