= Thomas van der Mars =

Dutch basketball player

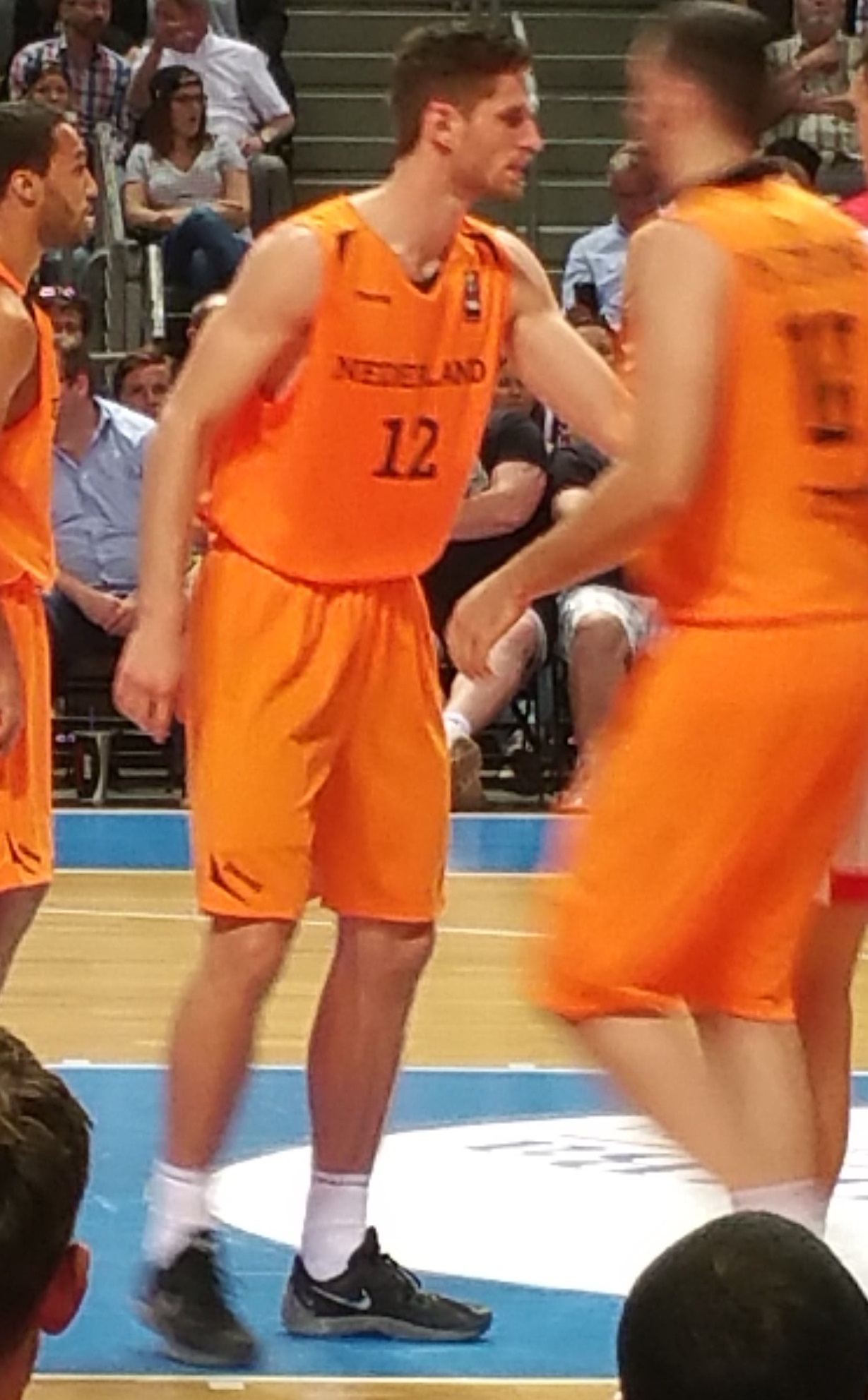
- Van der Mars playing for the Netherlands in 2016

Personal information
- Born: 15 November 1990 (age 36) Amersfoort, Netherlands
- Listed height: 6 ft 10 in (2.08 m)
- Listed weight: 236 lb (107 kg)

Career information
- High school: Canarias Basketball Academy (Las Palmas, Gran Canaria)
- College: Portland (2011–2015)
- NBA draft: 2015: undrafted
- Playing career: 2015–2024
- Position: Center

Career history
- 2015–2016: Kavala
- 2016–2017: Rapla
- 2017–2018: Kalev
- 2018–2019: Okapi Aalstar
- 2019–2024: Heroes Den Bosch

Career highlights
- BNXT Dutch Player of the Year (2023); BNXT Dutch Champion (2022); BNXT Dutch Finals MVP (2022); Dutch Cup winner (2024); KML Most Valuable Player (2017); All-KML Team (2017); KML All-Star (2017); First-team Academic All-American (2015); Third-team Academic All-American (2014)

Thomas van der Mars (born 15 November 1990) is a Dutch former professional basketball player. Standing at 6 ft 10 in (2.08 m), he played at the center position.

== Early career ==
A native of Gouda, van der Mars played for Canarias Basketball Academy in Spain.

== College ==
Thomas van der Mars played four years at Portland, averaging 13.5 points and 7.2 rebounds as a junior and 10.4 points and 8.0 rebounds as a senior.

== Professional career ==
In August 2015, Van der Mars signed with Kavala B.C. of the Greek Basket League. In January 2016, he parted ways with Kavala and signed with AVIS Rapla of the Estonian KML. Van der Mars had a successful season, as he claimed KML Most Valuable Player and All-KML Team honors on his way to the league finals. Over the 2017–18 season, he averaged 15.5 points (fifth in the league) and 12.3 rebounds per game (first in the league). With Rapla, he qualified for the team's first ever KML finals. However, Van der Mars and Rapla lost to Kalev Cramo, being swept 0–4.

In the 2017 offseason, he signed with Estonian defending champions Kalev Cramo.

On 4 July 2018, Van der Mars signed with Crelan Okapi Aalstar of the Belgian Pro Basketball League (PBL).

On 30 July 2019, van der Mars returned to the Netherlands by signing a three-year contract with New Heroes Den Bosch of the Dutch Basketball League (DBL). On 29 May 2022, he won his first national title with Den Bosch and was named the BNXT Dutch Finals MVP after averaging 11.4 points and 9.4 rebounds in the series against ZZ Leiden. Van der Mars had a game-high 16 rebounds in the decisive Game 5 win away in Leiden and was praised for his defence on Leiden' star player Asbjørn Midtgaard.

On 13 June 2022, he re-signed with Den Bosch for two more seasons; extending his contract to 2024.

== International career ==
Van der Mars made his debut for the Netherlands national basketball team on 5 August 2016, in an 84–79 loss against Poland.
