= BNXT League Sixth Man of the Year =

The BNXT League Sixth Man of the Year award is given annually at the end of the regular season of the BNXT League, the highest professional basketball league in Belgium and the Netherlands, to the player who performs best for his team as a substitute (or sixth man). To be eligible for this award, the player must come off the bench in more games than he started in the starting five.

The current award, given by the BNXT League, began when that league started, with the 2021–22 season.

== BNXT League Sixth Man of the Year winners (2022–present) ==
^	Denotes player who is still active in the BNXT League
*	Inducted into the FIBA Hall of Fame
†	Denotes player whose team won championship that year
Player (X)	Denotes the number of times the player has been named Sixth Man of the Year
Team (X)	Denotes the number of times a player from this team has won

- Player nationalities by national team:

Season	Player	Pos.	Nationality	Team	Ref.
2021–22	Mikael Jantunen	PF	Finland	(Belgium) Filou Oostende	
2022–23	Thijs De Ridder	SF	Belgium	(Belgium) Telenet Giants Antwerp	
2023–24	Nikola Jovanović	F/C	Serbia	(Belgium) Telenet Giants Antwerp (2)	
2024–25	Bram Bogaerts^	SF	Belgium	(Belgium) House of Talents Spurs	
2025–26	Dante Maddox Jr.^	G	United States	(Belgium) Okapi Aalst	
