= BNXT League Finals MVP =

The BNXT League Finals Most Valuable Player (MVP) award is given annually to the best performing player in the finals series of a BNXT League season, the highest professional basketball league in Belgium and the Netherlands. The winner of the award is determined by the average efficiency rating over the finals series.

Worthy de Jong was the inaugural award winner after receiving it on 11 June 2022.

== Winners ==
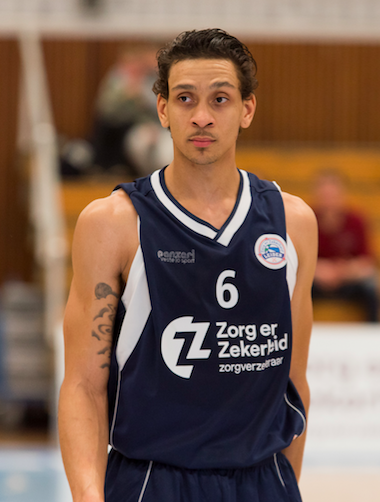
Worthy de Jong won the inaugural award in 2022

*	Inducted into the FIBA Hall of Fame
Player (X)	Denotes the number of times the player has been named Finals MVP
Team (X)	Denotes the number of times a player from this team has won

Season	Player	Pos.	Nationality	Team	Ref.
2022	Worthy de Jong	SG / SF	Netherlands	(Netherlands) ZZ Leiden	
2023	David Collins	PG / SG	United States	(Netherlands) ZZ Leiden (2)	
2024	Damien Jefferson	SF	United States	(Belgium) Filou Oostende	
