= BNXT League National Finals MVP =

The BNXT League National Finals MVP Player award is given annually at the end of the finals of the national playoffs of the BNXT League, the highest professional basketball league in Belgium and the Netherlands.

The award is given to the player on the championship team with the highest index rating over all the finals games.

== Key ==
Player (X)	Denotes the number of times the player has been named MVP
Team (X)	Denotes the number of times a player from this team has won

== List of winners ==
=== Netherlands ===
Season	Player	Pos.	Nationality	Team	Index per game	Ref.
2021–22	Thomas van der Mars	C	Netherlands	Heroes Den Bosch	16.2	
2022–23	Thomas Rutherford	F/C	USA	ZZ Leiden	18.0	
2023–24	Brock Gardner	SF	USA	ZZ Leiden (2)	25.5	
2024–25	Le’Tre Darthard	G	USA	Heroes Den Bosch	24.3	
2025–26	Jalen Thomas	C	USA	Landstede Hammers	21.5	

=== Belgium ===
Season	Player	Pos.	Nationality	Team	Index per game	Ref.
2021–22	Keye van der Vuurst de Vries	G	Netherlands	Filou Oostende	15.5	
2022–23	Vrenz Bleijenbergh	F	Belgium	Filou Oostende (2)	16.5	
2023–24	Damien Jefferson	SF	United States	Filou Oostende (3)	23.3	
2024–25	Timmy Allen	SF	United States	Filou Oostende (4)	20.5	
2025–26	Rasheed Bello	G	United States	Antwerp Giants	20.6	
