= BNXT League Rising Star of the Year =

The BNXT League Rising Star of the Year award is given annually at the end of the regular season of the BNXT League, the highest professional basketball league in Belgium and the Netherlands. This award is given to two young upcoming basketball talents in the BNXT League. One Belgian and one Dutch player has been awarded. To be eligible, players must be under 23 years old.

The current award, given by the BNXT League, began when that league started, with the 2021–22 season.

== BNXT League Player of the Year winners (2022–present) ==
^	Denotes player who is still active in the BNXT League
*	Inducted into the FIBA Hall of Fame
†	Denotes player whose team won championship that year
Player (X)	Denotes the number of times the player has been named Rising Star
Team (X)	Denotes the number of times a player from this team has won

- Player nationalities by national team:

Season	Country	Player	Pos.	Nationality	Team	Ref.
2021–22	Belgium	Haris Bratanovic^	C	Belgium	(Belgium) Filou Oostende	
2021–22	Netherlands	Sander Hollanders	SG	Netherlands	(Netherlands) BAL	
2022–23	Belgium	Thijs De Ridder	SF	Belgium	(Belgium) Telenet Giants Antwerp	
2022–23	Netherlands	Oshean Brathwaite^	SF	Netherlands	(Netherlands) BAL (2)	
2023–24	Belgium	Jo Van Buggenhout	PG	Belgium	(Belgium) Telenet Giants Antwerp (2)	
2023–24	Netherlands	Jibbe Sicking^	F	Netherlands	(Netherlands) ZZ Leiden	
2024–25	Belgium	Noah Meeusen	G	Belgium	(Belgium) Filou Oostende (2)	
2024–25	Netherlands	Matthijs Verhallen^	G	Netherlands	(Netherlands) Den Helder Suns	
2025–26	Belgium	Letto Van Drom^	G	Belgium	(Belgium) Windrose Antwerp Giants (3)	
2025–26	Netherlands	Tjall de Vaal^	G	Netherlands	(Netherlands) Rotterdam City Basketball	
