= Ángel Rodríguez (basketball) =

Puerto Rican basketball player (born 1992)

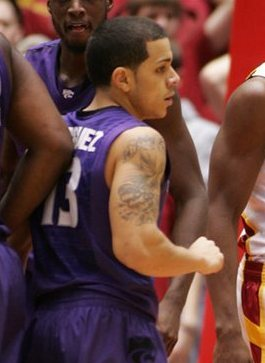
- Rodríguez with Kansas State, 2012

No. 24 – Cangrejeros de Santurce
- Position: Point guard
- League: Baloncesto Superior Nacional

Personal information
- Born: December 5, 1992 (age 33) Río Piedras, Puerto Rico USA
- Listed height: 6 ft 0 in (1.83 m)
- Listed weight: 180 lb (82 kg)

Career information
- High school: Dr. Krop (Miami, Florida)
- College: Kansas State (2011–2013); Miami (Florida) (2014–2016)
- NBA draft: 2016: undrafted
- Playing career: 2016–present

Career history
- 2016–2017: Cholet Basket
- 2017–2018: Maccabi Haifa
- 2018: Vaqueros de Bayamón
- 2018–2019: Rio Grande Valley Vipers
- 2019–2020: Austin Spurs
- 2020–2022: Vaqueros de Bayamón
- 2022–2023: Liège Basket
- 2023–2024: Vaqueros de Bayamón
- 2023–2024: Liège Basket
- 2024–present: Cangrejeros de Santurce

Career highlights
- BNXT League Dream Team (2024); 2× BSN champion (2020, 2022); BSN Finals Most Valuable Player (2020); BSN Most Valuable Player (2021); BSN Rookie of the Year (2018); Third-team All-ACC (2016); Second-team All-Big 12 (2013); Big 12 All-Defensive Team (2013)
- Stats at Basketball Reference
Medals
Men's basketball
Representing Puerto Rico
Centrobasket U18
Gold medal – first place	2009 Aguas Calientes

Ángel Daniel Rodríguez Tricoche (born December 5, 1992) is a Puerto Rican professional basketball player for Cangrejeros de Santurce of the Baloncesto Superior Nacional (BSN). He played college basketball for Kansas State University and the University of Miami.

== College career ==
Rodriguez began his collegiate career at Kansas State. As a sophomore, he averaged 11.4 points and 5.2 assists per game. Following the season, he opted to transfer to Miami (Florida) to be closer to his home in Puerto Rico. Rodríguez averaged 12.6 points per game, 1.7 steals per game and 4.5 assists per game as a senior. On March 6, 2016, Rodríguez was named to the Third-team All-ACC. He also led his team to the Sweet 16 of the NCAA tournament.

== Professional career ==
=== NBA Summer League ===
Rodríguez went undrafted in the 2016 NBA draft. After going undrafted, Rodríguez received an invitation to play in the 2016 NBA Summer League with the San Antonio Spurs.

=== Cholet Basket (2016–2017) ===
In July 2016, Rodríguez joined the San Antonio Spurs for the 2016 NBA Summer League and on July 9, 2016, Rodríguez signed a one-year deal with Cholet Basket.

=== Maccabi Haifa (2017–2018) ===
On August 3, 2017, Rodríguez signed with the Israeli club Maccabi Haifa for the 2017–18 season. On May 7, 2018, Rodríguez recorded a career-high 31 points, shooting 4-of-5 from three-point range, along with 4 assists and 3 steals in a 92–79 win over Maccabi Rishon LeZion.

In 31 games played during the 2017–18 season, Rodríguez led the Israeli League in steals (2.4 per game) and was the fifth leading player in assists (4.7 per game). Rodríguez also averaged 13.1 points and 3.5 rebounds per game.

=== Rio Grande Valley Vipers (2018–2019) ===
For the 2018–19 season, Rodríguez was signed by the Houston Rockets of the National Basketball Association (NBA) for training camp. He was waived on October 13. He was the added to the training camp roster of the Rockets’ NBA G League affiliate, the Rio Grande Valley Vipers. On October 27, 2019, Rodríguez was included in the training camp roster of the Rio Grande Valley Vipers. On November 7, 2019, Rodríguez was included in the opening night roster of the Rio Grande Valley Vipers. He tallied 29 points, nine assists, four rebounds, two steals and two blocks during a win over the Iowa Wolves on December 29.

=== Austin Spurs (2019–2020) ===
On December 31, 2019, Rodríguez was traded to the Austin Spurs by the Rio Grande Valley Vipers for the returning right of Josh Huestis.

=== Vaqueros de Bayamon (2020–2022) ===
On 2020, Rodriguez Tricoche returned to the Baloncesto Superior Nacional to play for the Vaqueros de Bayamón. On March 12, 2020, the league announced that they will be postponing the tournament because of the coronavirus. The BSN resumed the competition on November 10, 2020, in a bubble format, similar to what the NBA did. The bubble took place at the Wyndham Grand Rio Mar Puerto Rico Golf & Beach Resort, in Rio Grande, Puerto Rico with a duration of six weeks. The Vaqueros were crowned champions after sweeping the Piratas de Quebradillas in the Serie Final Chrysler. Angel carried the finals Most Valuable Player award after helping Bayamon to won their 15th championship in league's history.

The next season, even he was named Most Valuable Player and dominated the league with 19 points, 5.6 rebounds, and led the tournament in assists averaging 8.4 per game, not everything were good news for the team. On September 27, 2021, the point guard injured his right hand thumb and that kept him out for the rest of the season. The Vaqueros still went to the playoffs but were eliminated in the semifinals by the Mets de Guaynabo (basketball).

In the 2022 season, he won his second championship with Bayamón when they defeated Atléticos de San Germán in the finals.

=== Cangrejeros de Santurce (BCL Americas) ===
After recovering from his injury, Angel and his Vaqueros de Bayamon teammate, the shooting guard Benito Santiago Jr. reunited in the Cangrejeros de Santurce (basketball) to represent Puerto Rico in the Basketball Champions League Americas. Rodriguez has registered 19 assists in their first two games.

== National team career ==
Rodríguez played for Puerto Rico at the 2017 FIBA AmeriCup where he averaged 10.7 points, 3.3 rebounds, 2.0 assists and 2.3 steals per game in two games played.
