= BNXT League Most Valuable Player =

The BNXT League Most Valuable Player award is given annually at the end of the regular season of the BNXT League, the highest professional basketball league in Belgium and the Netherlands, to the most valuable player of the league.

The award is the first tier MVP award in both the Dutch and Belgian system, replacing the Pro Basketball League MVP and DBL Most Valuable Player Award. The current award, given by the BNXT League, began when that league started, with the 2021–22 season.

== BNXT League MVP winners (2022–present) ==
^	Denotes player who is still active in the BNXT League
*	Inducted into the FIBA Hall of Fame
†	Denotes player whose team won championship that year
Player (X)	Denotes the number of times the player has been named MVP
Team (X)	Denotes the number of times a player from this team has won

- Player nationalities by national team:

Season	Player	Pos.	Nationality	Team	Ref.
2021–22	Levi Randolph	G/F	United States	(Belgium) Filou Oostende	
2022–23	Brian Fobbs	SG	United States	(Belgium) Kangoeroes Mechelen	
2023–24	Damien Jefferson	SF	United States	(Belgium) Filou Oostende (2)	
2024–25	Timmy Allen	SF	United States	(Belgium) Filou Oostende (3)	
2025–26	Dante Maddox Jr.	G	United States	(Belgium) Okapi Aalst	
