= Mons.Arena =

Multi-purpose indoor arena in Mons, Belgium

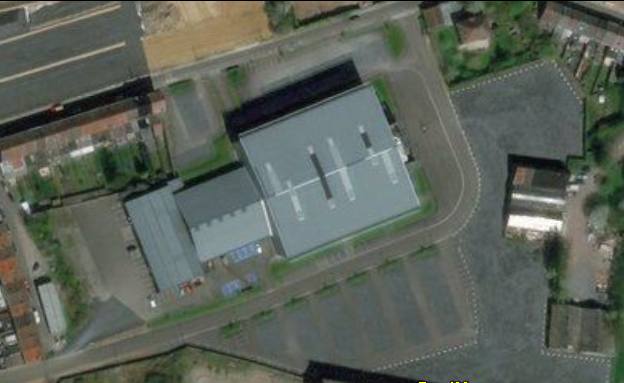
- Satellite photo of the Mons.Arena
- Interactive map of Mons.Arena
- Address: Rue des Laminoirs 2
- Location: Mons, Belgium
- Coordinates: 50.450249°N 3.876135°E
- Owner: Municipality-owned
- Capacity: 3,700

Tenant
- Belfius Mons-Hainaut

Mons.Arena is a multi-purpose indoor arena in Mons (Jemappes), Belgium. Mons.Arena has a capacity of 3,700 people. It hosts the home games of Belfius Mons-Hainaut basketball club.

In March 2019, the name was changed to Diamonte Mons.Arena until 31 December 2020 because of sponsorship agreements.
