= BNXT League =

Professional basketball league in Belgium and the Netherlands

- Organising body: Dutch Basketball League; Pro Basketball League
- Founded: December 10, 2020; 5 years ago
- First season: 2021–22
- Country: Belgium; Netherlands
- Confederation: (European Union) FIBA Europe
- Number of teams: 18
- Level on pyramid: 1
- Relegation to: Top Division Men One (Belgium); Promotiedivisie (Netherlands)
- Domestic cup(s): Basketball Cup (Belgium); Basketball Cup (Netherlands)
- Supercup: BNXT Supercup; Dutch Supercup
- International cup(s): Champions League; FIBA Europe Cup
- Current champions: Windrose Giants Antwerp (1st title) (2025–26 BNXT League)
- Most championships: ZZ Leiden (2 titles)
- CEO: Wim Van de Keere
- President: Ramses Braakman
- TV partners: bnxt.tv (PlaySight Interactive)
- Website: bnxtleague.com
- 2026–27 BNXT League

The BNXT League is a professional basketball league in Belgium and the Netherlands. The league is the first tier in both the Dutch and Belgian systems, replacing the DBL and PBL. The inaugural season was the 2021–22 season, which started in September 2021.

== History ==
On 10 December 2020, it was announced that the Belgian Pro Basketball League and Dutch Basketball League would merge to form a new multinational league. All clubs from the Dutch DBL voted for, while 9 of 10 teams in Belgium voted in favor of the decision. Serious talks about the initiative had been ongoing since fall 2019. On 20 May 2021, the new name "BNXT League" and logo of the league were announced.

The league started its inaugural season amidst an ongoing COVID-19 pandemic and a great number of games had to be played behind locked doors as a result of national lockdowns. On 11 June 2022, ZZ Leiden were crowned the inaugural BNXT champions. The following year, on 13 June 2023, Leiden repeated as champions.

On 19th of March, Den Helder Suns announced they were unable to continue in the league and would not apply for a license in the next season. They stated that it was increasingly difficult to sustain a competitive team while simultaneously investing in the required improvements the league demanded, like a general manager and a basketball floor. This decision was followed by LWD Basket and BAL, who battled with the same problems. This small exodus of Dutch teams and the promotion of CB Liège into the league meant that in the 2026-27 season, the balance of teams became heavily skewed towards Belgium, with 11 Belgium teams and only 5 Dutch teams.

== Sponsorship ==
On 10 September 2021, the league announced its first name sponsorship when Belgian betting company betFirst signed to become naming sponsor for three seasons.

== Competition formula ==
From 2021–22 to 2023–24, the league consisted of different stages. In the first stage, teams played each other home and away in the national regular season. After this, the teams were divided in the Elite Gold and Elite Silver group for the cross-border season. Next, the teams from the Elite Gold and the 3 best teams from the Elite Silver played in the national playoffs to compete for the national championships. The two winners of the national playoffs then played in the BNXT League Final.

Starting from the 2024–25 season, the league will have a new format in which all 19 teams play each other home and away in the regular season. The highest ranked teams from each country play national playoffs, and the two national winners play for the BNXT championship.

== Teams ==
The following 18 teams were to play in the 2025–26 season. All teams from the Pro Basketball League and Dutch Basketball League transferred to the BNXT League in 2021. The newest club to have joined the BNXT League are the CB Liège, who joined in 2026.

=== Stadiums and locations ===
Location of teams in the BNXT League

Note: Table lists in alphabetical order.

Club	Location	Venue	Capacity
Netherlands
Donar	Groningen	MartiniPlaza	4,350
Heroes Den Bosch	's-Hertogenbosch	Maaspoort	2,800
Landstede Hammers	Zwolle	Landstede Sportcentrum	1,200
Rotterdam City Basketball	Rotterdam	Topsportcentrum Rotterdam	2,500
ZZ Leiden	Leiden	Vijf Meihal	2,000
Belgium
Antwerp Giants	Antwerp	Lotto Arena	5,218
Brussels Basketball	Brussels	Sports Complex Neder-Over-Heembeek	1,200
CB Liège	Waremme	Province Ballons Arena	900
Kangoeroes Mechelen	Mechelen	Winketkaai	1,500
Kortrijk Spurs	Kortrijk	Sportcampus Lange Munte	2,400
Leuven Bears	Leuven	Sportoase	3,400
Limburg United	Hasselt	Alverberg Sporthal	1,730
CityX Mons	Mons	Mons Arena	4,000
Okapi Aalst	Aalst	Okapi Forum	2,800
Oostende	Ostend	Coretec Dôme	5,000
Spirou	Charleroi	Spiroudome	6,200

=== Former teams ===
Club	Location	Venue	Capacity	Founded	Seasons	Last season	Reason
(Netherlands) Apollo Amsterdam	Amsterdam	Apollohal	1,500	2011	2	2022–23	Failed to meet the financial requirements
(Netherlands) BAL	Weert	Sporthal Boshoven	1,000	2013	5	2025–26	Voluntarily relegated due to financial reasons
(Netherlands) Den Helder Suns	Den Helder	Sporthal Quelderduijn	1,250	2016	5	2025–26	Voluntarily relegated due to financial reasons
(Belgium) Liège Basket	Liège	Country Hall	5,000	1967	3	2023–24	Dissolution of the club due to financial reasons
(Netherlands) LWD Basket	Leeuwarden	Kalverdijkje	1,700	2004	5	2025–26	Voluntarily relegated due to financial reasons
(Netherlands) QSTA United	Bemmel	De Kooi	650	2020	4	2024–25	Relegation
(Netherlands) The Hague Royals	The Hague	Sportcampus Zuiderpark	3,500	2020	1	2021–22	Dissolution of the club due to financial reasons

== BNXT champions ==
The finals were played in a two-legged format in 2022, after that season the format was changed to a best-of-three playoffs series. Since the 2024–25 season, the BNXT League championship has been awarded to the club that finishes first in the regular season.

Season	Champions	Score	Runners-up	Finals MVP
2021–22	ZZ Leiden	146–142 (75–72, 71–70)	Donar	Worthy de Jong
2022–23	ZZ Leiden (2)	2–1	Filou Oostende	David Collins
2023–24	Filou Oostende	164–124 (85–58, 79–66)	ZZ Leiden	Damien Jefferson
2024–25	Kangoeroes Basket Mechelen	—N/a	House of Talents Spurs	—N/a
2025–26	Windrose Giants Antwerp	—N/a	Filou Oostende	—N/a

== National champions ==
=== Netherlands ===
Season	Champions	Score	Runners-up	Finals MVP
2021–22	Heroes Den Bosch	3–2	ZZ Leiden	Thomas van der Mars
2022–23	ZZ Leiden	3–2	Donar	Thomas Rutherford
2023–24	ZZ Leiden	3–1	Heroes Den Bosch	Brock Gardner
2024–25	Heroes Den Bosch	3–0	ZZ Leiden	Le'Tre Darthard
2025–26	Landstede Hammers	3–1	ZZ Leiden	Jalen Thomas

=== Belgium ===
Season	Champions	Score	Runners-up	Finals MVP
2021–22	Oostende	3–1	Kangoeroes Mechelen	Keye van der Vuurst de Vries
2022–23	Oostende	3–1	Antwerp Giants	Vrenz Bleijenbergh
2023–24	Oostende	3–1	Antwerp Giants	Damien Jefferson
2024–25	Oostende	3–1	Kangoeroes Mechelen	Timmy Allen
2025–26	Antwerp Giants	3–2	Oostende	Rasheed Bello

== Awards ==
- Most Valuable Player (MVP)
- Finals MVP (BNXT)
- Finals MVP (Belgium)
- Finals MVP (Netherlands)
- Dream Team
- Player of the Year (Netherlands)
- Player of the Year (Belgium)
- Rising Star of the Year (Netherlands)
- Rising Star of the Year (Belgium)
- Sixth Man of the Year
- Defensive Player of the Year
- Coach of the Year (Netherlands)
- Coach of the Year (Belgium)

== Broadcasting partners ==
- BNXT.tv (online)
- NPO 1
- Proximus
- Sporza
- Ziggo Sport
