= 2013–14 Dutch Basketball League squads =

The 2013–14 Dutch Basketball League season was the 54th season of the Dutch Basketball League. The following ten squads participated.

== BC Apollo ==
BC Apollo roster
Players
Coaches

Pos.	No.	Nat.	Name	Ht.
PG	4	(Netherlands)	de Vries Andries, Jeffrey	1.84 m (6 ft 0 in)
SG	5	(Netherlands)	van der Laan, Jos	1.84 m (6 ft 0 in)
PG	6	(Netherlands)	Royé, Aron	1.83 m (6 ft 0 in)
SG	7	(Netherlands)	Ridderhof, Mark	1.92 m (6 ft 4 in)
PG	8	(Netherlands)	Brunink, Yannick	1.90 m (6 ft 3 in)
SG	9	(Netherlands)	Slagter, Gian	1.93 m (6 ft 4 in)
PF	10	(Netherlands)	Weijs, Berend	2.07 m (6 ft 9 in)
SF	11	(Netherlands)	van Sauers, Julius	2.00 m (6 ft 7 in)
PG	12	(Netherlands)	Dawson, Andrew	1.88 m (6 ft 2 in)
F	13	(Netherlands)	Brandt, Joël	1.98 m (6 ft 6 in)
C	14	(Netherlands)	Steijn, Lucas	2.08 m (6 ft 10 in)
C	15	(Netherlands)	Krabbendam, Robert (L)	2.10 m (6 ft 11 in)

Head coach

(Netherlands) Hakim Salem

Assistant coach(es)

(Netherlands) Patrick Faydherbe

Legend

- (C) Team captain
- Injured

- L: left during the season.

== SPM Shoeters Den Bosch ==
SPM Shoeters Den Bosch roster
Players
Coaches

Pos.	No.	Nat.	Name	Ht.
G	4	(Netherlands)	Nguyen, Vincent	1.78 m (5 ft 10 in)
SG	5	(United States)	Farokhmanesh, Ali	1.83 m (6 ft 0 in)
PF	6	(United States)	Wesley, Tai	2.00 m (6 ft 7 in)
PF	7	(Netherlands)	Wessels, Stefan	2.03 m (6 ft 8 in)
SG	8	(United States)	Gonzalvez, David	1.93 m (6 ft 4 in)
SG	9	(Netherlands)	Schilder, Mike	1.70 m (5 ft 7 in)
PF	10	(Netherlands)	de Pagter, Ralf	2.00 m (6 ft 7 in)
PG	11	(United States)	Johnson, Tony	1.83 m (6 ft 0 in)
SF	12	(Netherlands)	Akerboom, Jr., Kees	2.00 m (6 ft 7 in)
PF	13	(Netherlands)	Adriaans, Frerik	1.99 m (6 ft 6 in)
SG	14	(Netherlands)	de Vries, Pim	1.93 m (6 ft 4 in)
C	15	(Netherlands)	Aarts, Marcel	2.13 m (7 ft 0 in)

Head coach

(United States) Sam Jones

Assistant coach(es)

(Netherlands) Sander van der Holst

Legend

- (C) Team captain
- Injured

== Den Helder Kings ==
Den Helder Kings roster
Players
Coaches

Pos.	No.	Nat.	Name	Ht.
SG	4	(Netherlands)	Jansen, Rogier	1.88 m (6 ft 2 in)
SF	5	(Netherlands)	Bach, Philip	1.95 m (6 ft 5 in)
PG	6	(Netherlands)	Landman, Kevin	1.85 m (6 ft 1 in)
C	7	(Netherlands)	Essenstam, Luke	2.06 m (6 ft 9 in)
SF	8	(Netherlands)	Bleeker, Steve	1.93 m (6 ft 4 in)
SG	9	(Netherlands)	Theeuwkens, Ties	1.90 m (6 ft 3 in)
PF	10	(Netherlands)	van Schaik, Max	2.09 m (6 ft 10 in)
C	11	(Netherlands)	van der List, Jeroen	2.13 m (7 ft 0 in)
PF	12	(Netherlands)	Treffers, Quincy	2.02 m (6 ft 8 in)
PG	13	(Puerto Rico)	Ubilla, Emanuel	1.88 m (6 ft 2 in)
SF	14	(United States)	Cowels III, Raymond	1.94 m (6 ft 4 in)
PF	15	(United States)	Keely, Reggie (L)	2.05 m (6 ft 9 in)
PF	15	(United States)	Knox, Justin	2.05 m (6 ft 9 in)
C	21	(Netherlands)	Halman, Dyon	2.03 m (6 ft 8 in)
PG	22	(United States)	Primm, J.P. (A)	1.85 m (6 ft 1 in)

Head coach

(Belgium) Jean-Marc Jaumin

Assistant coach(es)

(Netherlands) Mike Nahar

Legend

- (C) Team captain
- Injured

- L: left during season.
- A: acquired during season.

== GasTerra Flames ==
GasTerra Flames roster
Players
Coaches

Pos.	No.	Nat.	Name	Ht.
G	4	(Netherlands)	Slagter, Arvin	1.91 m (6 ft 3 in)
PF	5	(United States)	Robinson, Jeff (A/L)	1.98 m (6 ft 6 in)
PF	22	(United States)	Coleman, Dan	2.06 m (6 ft 9 in)
SF	6	(Netherlands)	van der Ark, Yannick	1.92 m (6 ft 4 in)
PG	7	(Netherlands)	Bouwknecht, Maarten	1.85 m (6 ft 1 in)
SF	8	(United States)	Dourisseau, Jason	1.96 m (6 ft 5 in)
C	9	(Netherlands)	Osaikhwuwuomwan, Craig	2.11 m (6 ft 11 in)
PG	11	(United States)	Wright, Cashmere	1.83 m (6 ft 0 in)
PF	12	(Canada)	Bekkering, Ross	2.03 m (6 ft 8 in)
F	13	(Netherlands)	Hof, Mark-Peter	1.99 m (6 ft 6 in)
SG	14	(United States)	Pryor, Quentin	1.93 m (6 ft 4 in)
C	15	(Netherlands)	Koenis, Thomas	2.10 m (6 ft 11 in)
SG	21	(Netherlands)	Voorn, Jessey	1.93 m (6 ft 4 in)
C	23	(Netherlands)	van der Reijden, Benny	1.93 m (6 ft 4 in)

Head coach

(Croatia) Ivica Skelin

Assistant coach(es)

(Netherlands) Anjo Mekel

Legend

- (C) Team captain
- Injured

- A: acquired during season.
- L: left during season.

== Aris Leeuwarden ==
Aris Leeuwarden roster
Players
Coaches

Pos.	No.	Nat.	Name	Ht.
PF	4	(Netherlands)	Visser, Jelmer	2.02 m (6 ft 8 in)
SG	5	(Netherlands)	de Paula, Tjoe	1.85 m (6 ft 1 in)
SG	6	(Netherlands)	Swart, Enzo	1.88 m (6 ft 2 in)
PF	7	(United States)	Lumpkins, Stephen	2.03 m (6 ft 8 in)
PG	8	(Netherlands)	Hope, Dexter	1.85 m (6 ft 1 in)
PF	9	(United States Virgin Islands)	Washington, Greg (L)	2.08 m (6 ft 10 in)
PF	9	(United States)	Rochford, Kinu (A/L)	1.98 m (6 ft 6 in)
PF	9	(United States)	Healy, Nathan (A)	2.01 m (6 ft 7 in)
PG	10	(United States)	Theus, Darius	1.90 m (6 ft 3 in)
SF	11	(United States)	Snikkers, Tom	1.94 m (6 ft 4 in)
C	12	(Netherlands)	Markusse, Jesse	2.06 m (6 ft 9 in)
F	14	(United States)	Kamczyc, Tim	2.00 m (6 ft 7 in)
SF	15	(Netherlands)	van der Kooij, Jan	1.98 m (6 ft 6 in)

Head coach

(Netherlands) Ed Molthoff

Assistant coach(es)

(Netherlands) Tom Simpson

Legend

- (C) Team captain
- Injured

- A: acquired during season.
- L = left during the season.

== Zorg en Zekerheid Leiden ==
Zorg en Zekerheid Leiden roster
Players
Coaches

Pos.	No.	Nat.	Name	Ht.
G	4	(Netherlands)	Franke, Yannick (L)	1.90 m (6 ft 3 in)
SG	4	(United States)	Wright, DeJuan (A)	1.91 m (6 ft 3 in)
G	5	(Netherlands)	Averink, Kasper	1.83 m (6 ft 0 in)
SG	6	(Netherlands)	de Jong, Worthy	1.94 m (6 ft 4 in)
F	7	(Netherlands)	Dijkhuizen, Jaron	1.95 m (6 ft 5 in)
PF	8	(Australia)	Duinker, Joshua	2.10 m (6 ft 11 in)
F	9	(United States)	Schachtner, Mike	2.06 m (6 ft 9 in)
F	10	(Netherlands)	Breel, Thomas	1.97 m (6 ft 6 in)
PF	11	(Netherlands)	Kherrazi, Mohamed	2.00 m (6 ft 7 in)
C	12	(Netherlands)	Nelemans, Bas	2.06 m (6 ft 9 in)
PG	13	(United States)	Holcomb-Faye, Whit	1.85 m (6 ft 1 in)
G	14	(United States)	Cunningham, Sean	1.88 m (6 ft 2 in)
C	15	(United States)	Conrad, Jason (L)	2.13 m (7 ft 0 in)
F	23	(Netherlands)	Prins, Jake	1.95 m (6 ft 5 in)
C	15	(United States)	Thompson, Kevin (A)	2.05 m (6 ft 9 in)

Head coach

(Netherlands) Toon van Helfteren

Assistant coach(es)

(Netherlands) Raoul Straathof

Legend

- (C) Team captain
- Injured

- L: left during season.
- A: acquired during season.

== Matrixx Magixx ==
Matrixx Magixx roster
Players
Coaches

Pos.	No.	Nat.	Name	Ht.
G	4	(Netherlands)	Biesters, Kay	1.95 m (6 ft 5 in)
PG	5	(Netherlands)	Mladenovic, Stefan	1.91 m (6 ft 3 in)
SF	7	(United States)	Franklin, Roger	1.96 m (6 ft 5 in)
SG	8	(Netherlands)	Vermeulen, Thijs	1.94 m (6 ft 4 in)
SF	9	(United States)	Richard, Patrick	1.93 m (6 ft 4 in)
PF	10	(Canada)	Sihota, Robbie	1.98 m (6 ft 6 in)
C	11	(Netherlands)	van Tongeren, Matthew	1.98 m (6 ft 6 in)
PG	13	(Netherlands)	van der Horst, Dimeo	1.95 m (6 ft 5 in)
C	14	(Netherlands)	Oudendag, Nick	2.09 m (6 ft 10 in)
C	15	(Netherlands)	Poels, Sjors	2.09 m (6 ft 10 in)
SF	6	(United States)	Martin, Kelvin (A)	1.95 m (6 ft 5 in)

Head coach

(Netherlands) Michael Schuurs

Assistant coach(es)

(Netherlands) Max van der Wielen

Legend

- (C) Team captain
- Injured

- A: acquired during season.

== Rotterdam Basketbal College ==
Rotterdam Basketbal College roster
Players
Coaches

Pos.	No.	Nat.	Name	Ht.
PG	4	(United States)	Anderson, La'Shard	1.85 m (6 ft 1 in)
G	5	(Lithuania)	Tamasauskas, Vaidas	1.80 m (5 ft 11 in)
G	6	(Netherlands)	Rigters, Don	1.93 m (6 ft 4 in)
SF	7	(Netherlands)	Plasmans, Twan	2.00 m (6 ft 7 in)
PG	7	(Netherlands)	Franke, Yannick (A)	2.13 m (7 ft 0 in)
G	8	(Netherlands)	Filipan, Ivan	1.93 m (6 ft 4 in)
F	9	(Netherlands)	Kok, Michael	1.86 m (6 ft 1 in)
SG	10	(United States)	Otten, Matthew	1.96 m (6 ft 5 in)
PF	11	(Netherlands)	Addow, Hoessein	2.05 m (6 ft 9 in)
C	12	(Netherlands)	Stolk, Bart	2.08 m (6 ft 10 in)
C	13	(Netherlands)	Krabbendam, Robert (A)	2.10 m (6 ft 11 in)
PF	14	(United States)	Echols, Cameron	2.03 m (6 ft 8 in)
C	15	(Netherlands)	Dalgliesh, Seraino	2.13 m (7 ft 0 in)
PG	21	(Netherlands)	Maxwell, Richard	1.85 m (6 ft 1 in)
C	22	(Netherlands)	Pijp, Rik	2.05 m (6 ft 9 in)

Head coach

(Netherlands) Ferry Steenmetz

Assistant coach(es)

(Netherlands) Armand Salomon

Legend

- (C) Team captain
- Injured

- A: acquired during season.

== Maxxcom BSW ==
Maxxcom BSW roster
Players
Coaches

Pos.	No.	Nat.	Name	Ht.
G	4	(Netherlands)	Ormskerk, Jeremy	1.88 m (6 ft 2 in)
G	5	(Netherlands)	Doekhi, Dyon	1.87 m (6 ft 2 in)
F	6	(Netherlands)	Padberg, Joost	2.02 m (6 ft 8 in)
G	7	(Netherlands)	Elilyas, Yunis	1.84 m (6 ft 0 in)
SF	8	(Netherlands)	Besseling, Sjors	1.98 m (6 ft 6 in)
PF	9	(Russia)	Grigoryev, Roman	2.00 m (6 ft 7 in)
SF	10	(Netherlands)	Eduardo, Akeel	1.91 m (6 ft 3 in)
PG	11	(Netherlands)	Mulder, Stefan	1.83 m (6 ft 0 in)
G	13	(Netherlands)	de Jager, Thomas	1.80 m (5 ft 11 in)
C	14	(Netherlands)	Aarts, Roel	2.02 m (6 ft 8 in)
C	15	(Netherlands)	van Kempen, Kenneth	2.08 m (6 ft 10 in)

Head coach

(Netherlands) Niels Vorenhout

Legend

- (C) Team captain
- Injured

== Landstede Basketbal ==
Landstede Basketbal roster
Players
Coaches

Pos.	No.	Nat.	Name	Ht.
PG	4	(United States)	Tiller, J. T.	1.92 m (6 ft 4 in)
G	5	(Netherlands)	Williams, Leon	1.89 m (6 ft 2 in)
F	6	(Netherlands)	Witteveen, Lenno	1.97 m (6 ft 6 in)
F	7	(United States)	Greiner, Holden	2.07 m (6 ft 9 in)
PF	8	(Netherlands)	Hulzebos, Nikki	2.09 m (6 ft 10 in)
PF	9	(Netherlands)	Tönjann, Torben	2.03 m (6 ft 8 in)
SG	10	(Netherlands)	Lietmeijer, Valentijn	1.91 m (6 ft 3 in)
G	11	(Netherlands)	van Veen, Emil	1.92 m (6 ft 4 in)
F	12	(United States)	Stommes, Justin	2.00 m (6 ft 7 in)
C	13	(Netherlands)	Zondervan, Kenrick	2.06 m (6 ft 9 in)
G	14	(Netherlands)	Kloos, Ewoud	1.85 m (6 ft 1 in)
PF	15	(Suriname)	de Randamie, Sergio	2.01 m (6 ft 7 in)

Head coach

(Netherlands) Herman van den Belt

Assistant coach(es)

(Netherlands) Mark van Schutterhoef
(Netherlands) Rein van der Kamp

Legend

- (C) Team captain
- Injured
