= 2013–14 GasTerra Flames season =

GasTerra Flames
2013–14 season
- Chairman: Hans Haerkens
- Head coach: Ivica Skelin
- Arena: MartiniPlaza
- Dutch Basketball League: Champions (defeated SPM Shoeters)
- EuroChallenge: Regular season
- NBB Cup: Champions (defeated ZZ Leiden)
Home	Away

In the 2013–14 season, the GasTerra Flames from Groningen competed in the Dutch Basketball League, the NBB Cup and the EuroChallenge.

It was the second season under head coach Ivica Skelin. This season, Flames won its first "double" ever, after the team won the NBB Cup by beating ZZ Leiden in the final and beating SPM Shoeters Den Bosch 4–3 in the playoff finals to take the DBL title.

== Players ==
=== Squad information ===
GasTerra Flames roster
Players
Coaches

Pos.	No.	Nat.	Name	Ht.	Age
SG	6	(Netherlands)	van der Ark, Yannick	1.93 m (6 ft 4 in)	33 – 12 April 1993
SF	8	(United States)	Dourisseau, Jason	1.96 m (6 ft 5 in)	42 – 7 December 1983
C	15	(Netherlands)	Koenis, Thomas	2.07 m (6 ft 9 in)	36 – 11 December 1989
SG	21	(Netherlands)	Voorn, Jessey	1.93 m (6 ft 4 in)	36 – 17 March 1990
C	9	(Netherlands)	Osaikhwuwuomwan, Craig	2.11 m (6 ft 11 in)	35 – 12 October 1990
G	4	(Netherlands)	Slagter, Arvin	1.90 m (6 ft 3 in)	40 – 19 September 1985
PF	12	(Canada) (Netherlands)	Bekkering, Ross	2.03 m (6 ft 8 in)	38 – 17 August 1987
SF	13	(Netherlands)	Hof, Mark-Peter	1.99 m (6 ft 6 in)	36 – 2 January 1990
PF	22	(United States)	Coleman, Dan	2.06 m (6 ft 9 in)	41 – 13 February 1985
PG	11	(United States)	Wright, Cashmere	1.83 m (6 ft 0 in)	36 – 9 January 1990
G	14	(United States)	Pryor, Quentin	1.93 m (6 ft 4 in)	42 – 28 September 1983
G	7	(Netherlands)	Bouwknecht, Maarten	1.93 m (6 ft 4 in)	31 – 14 December 1994
C	23	(Netherlands)	van der Reijden, Benny	2.10 m (6 ft 11 in)	31 – 1 July 1994
PF	5	(United States)	Robinson, Jeff ( (Note: Robinson was acquired as a replacement of Coleman during his injury. He played three months for Groningen.))	1.98 m (6 ft 6 in)	37 – 8 July 1988

Head coach

(Croatia) Ivica Skelin

Assistant coach(es)

(Netherlands) Anjo Mekel

Legend

- (C) Team captain
- Injured

- Roster

=== Depth chart ===
Pos.	Starting 5	Bench 1	Bench 2
C	Thomas Koenis	Craig Osaikhwuwuomwan	Benny van der Reijden
PF	Dan Coleman; Jeff Robinson	Ross Bekkering
SF	Jason Dourisseau	Mark-Peter Hof
SG	Quentin Pryor	Jessey Voorn	Yannick van der Ark
PG	Cashmere Wright	Arvin Slagter	Maarten Bouwknecht

=== Roster changes ===
==== In ====
Player	Pos.	Moving from
(Netherlands) Craig Osaikhwuwuomwan	C	(Netherlands) Aris Leeuwarden
(Netherlands) Arvin Slagter	G	(Netherlands) Zorg en Zekerheid Leiden
(Canada) Ross Bekkering	C	(Netherlands) Zorg en Zekerheid Leiden
(Netherlands) Mark-Peter Hof	SF	(Netherlands) De Groene Uilen
(United States) Cashmere Wright	PG	(United States) Cincinnati Bearcats (NCAA)
(United States) Dan Coleman	PF	(Finland) Kataja Basket Club
(United States) Quentin Pryor	G	(Austria) Kapfenberg Bulls
(Netherlands) Maarten Bouwknecht	G	(Netherlands) GasTerra Flames (youth)

==== Out ====
Player	Position	Moving to
(Australia) Michael Kingma	C	(Australia) Rockhampton Cyclones
(Suriname) Sergio de Randamie	PF	(Netherlands) Landstede Basketbal
(Netherlands) Rogier Jansen	G	(Netherlands) Den Helder Kings
(Netherlands) Ties Theeuwkens	SF	(Netherlands) Den Helder Kings
(Netherlands) Dimeo van der Horst	PG	(Netherlands) Matrixx Magixx
(United States) Jamal Boykin	PF	(Germany) s.Oliver Baskets
(United States) Nate Rohnert	PG	no club

== Preseason ==
31 August 2013
20:00

Kangoeroes Basket Willebroek (Belgium)	65–59	(Netherlands) GasTerra Flames

Willebroek

6 September 2013
19:00

GasTerra Flames (Netherlands)	77–39	(Netherlands) Rotterdam Basketbal College

Veendam

7 September 2013
20:00

GasTerra Flames (Netherlands)	78–75	(Belgium) Kangoeroes Basket Willebroek

Leek

11 September 2013
19:30

Port of Antwerp Giants (Belgium)	77–57	(Netherlands) GasTerra Flames

Mechelen

15 September 2013
17:00

Belfius Mons-Hainaut (Belgium)	66–68	(Netherlands) GasTerra Flames

Mons

16 September 2013
19:00

BC Telenet Oostende (Belgium)	78–51	(Netherlands) GasTerra Flames

Ostend

20 September 2013
19:30

GasTerra Flames (Netherlands)	78–73	(Netherlands) Den Helder Kings

Uithuizen

23 September 2013
21:00

Groene Uilen (Netherlands)	44–83	(Netherlands) GasTerra Flames

Groningen

28 September 2013
16:00

Report

GasTerra Flames (Netherlands)	69–56	(Germany) Eisbären Bremerhaven

Martiniplaza, Groningen
Attendance: 2,000

== Dutch Basketball League ==
- Flags are the flags of the city of the teams.

=== Regular season ===
5 October 2013
20:30

Report

Zorg en Zekerheid Leiden	66–60	GasTerra Flames
Pts: Cunningham 21; Rebs: Kherrazi 8 Asts: Averink 3		Pts: Wright 23; Rebs: Bekkering 7 Asts: Dourisseau 4

Vijf Meihal, Leiden

12 October 2013
19:30

Report

GasTerra Flames	52–68	SPM Shoeters Den Bosch
Pts: Dourisseau 18; Rebs: Koenis, Bekkering 5 Asts: Slagter 5		Pts: Wesley 19; Rebs: Wesley 12; Asts: Wesley 4

Martiniplaza, Groningen

15 October 2013
19:30

Report

GasTerra Flames	81–45	BC Apollo
Pts: Koenis 13; Rebs: Bekkering 9 Asts: three players 3		Pts: Royé, Weijs 12; Rebs: Krabbendam 6 Asts: de Vries Andries, Royé 2

Martiniplaza, Groningen
Attendance: 1,650

17 October 2013
19:30

Report

GasTerra Flames	79–70	Den Helder Kings
Pts: Koenis, Slagter 15; Rebs: Koenis 11; Asts: Wright 5		Pts: Keely 22; Rebs: Cowels III 9 Asts: Ubilla 6

Martiniplaza, Groningen
Attendance: 2,360

19 October 2013
19:30

Report

Matrixx Magixx	60–63	GasTerra Flames
Pts: Vermeulen 14; Rebs: Sihota 11; Asts: Richard 3		Pts: Wright, Pryor 12; Rebs: Robinson 8 Asts: Slagter, Pryor 4

Sportcentrum De Arcus, Wijchen

24 October 2013
19:30

Report

GasTerra Flames	81–44	Maxxcom BSW
Pts: Robinson 23; Rebs: Robinson, Koenis 7 Asts: Slagter 6		Pts: Ormskerk 11; Rebs: van Kempen 10; Asts: Ormskerk, Eduardo 2

Martiniplaza, Groningen
Attendance: 2,850

27 October 2013
17:00

Report

BC Apollo	54–71	GasTerra Flames
Pts: Krabbendam, Dawson 10; Rebs: Krabbendam, Weijs 9 Asts: Royé 3		Pts: Robinson 20; Rebs: Robinson 11; Asts: Slagter, Pryor 7

Apollohal, Amsterdam

29 October 2013
19:30

Report

GasTerra Flames	91–57	Aris Leeuwarden
Pts: Bekkering 23; Rebs: Bekkering 12; Asts: Slagter 6		Pts: Theus 13; Rebs: Lumpkins, Markusse 7 Asts: de Paula 4

Martiniplaza, Groningen
Attendance: 2,640

9 November 2013
19:30

Den Helder Kings	64–74	GasTerra Flames

Kingsdome, Den Helder

=== Playoffs ===
==== Qualifying ====
Pos	Team	Pld	W	L	PF	PA	PD
1	GasTerra Flames	36	32	4	2759	2141	+618
2	SPM Shoeters Den Bosch	36	29	7	2865	2382	+483
3	Den Helder Kings	36	24	12	2832	2608	+224
4	Zorg en Zekerheid Leiden	36	22	14	2732	2512	+220
5	Landstede Basketbal	36	22	14	2807	2559	+248
6	Matrixx Magixx	36	20	16	2788	2542	+246
7	Aris Leeuwarden	36	13	23	2759	2996	−237
8	BC Apollo	36	7	29	2144	2702	−558

==== Quarterfinals: BC Apollo ====
16 October 2014
19:30

Report

GasTerra Flames	81–62	BC Apollo
Scoring by quarter: 36–19, 15–12, 14–19, 16–12
Pts: Dan Coleman 20; Rebs: Thomas Koenis 8 Asts: Cashmere Wright 4		Pts: Mark Ridderhof 24; Rebs: Lucas Steijn 7 Asts: Aron Royé 5

MartiniPlaza, Groningen
Attendance: 2.850

27 April 2014
11:00

Report

BC Apollo	58–71	GasTerra Flames
Scoring by quarter: 7–16, 9–21, 20–21, 22–13
Pts: Aron Royé 22; Rebs: 3 spelers 5 Asts: Jeffrey de Vries Andries 4		Pts: Arvin Slagter 14; Rebs: Thomas Koenis 11; Asts: Cashmere Wright 5

Apollohal, Amsterdam

==== Semifinals: Zorg en Zekerheid Leiden ====
1 May 2014
19:30

Report

GasTerra Flames	44–73	Zorg en Zekerheid Leiden
Scoring by quarter: 11–15, 8–16, 11–21, 14–21
Pts: Jason Dourisseau 11; Rebs: Ross Bekkering 8 Asts: Cashmere Wright 3		Pts: Mike Schachtner 13; Rebs: DeJuan Wright 8 Asts: Whit Holcomb-Faye 5

MartiniPlaza, Groningen

3 May 2014
20:30

Report

Zorg en Zekerheid Leiden	62–59 (OT)	GasTerra Flames
Scoring by quarter: 18–18, 9–7, 15–17, 11–11, Overtime: 11–11
Pts: DeJuan Wright 19; Rebs: de Jong, Duinker 7 Asts: Whit Holcomb-Faye 6		Pts: Jason Dourisseau 14; Rebs: Ross Bekkering 12; Asts: Jason Dourisseau 3

Vijf Meihal, Leiden
Attendance: 2.000

6 May 2014
19:30

Report

GasTerra Flames	74–66	Zorg en Zekerheid Leiden
Scoring by quarter: 20–15, 11–14, 20–23, 23–14
Pts: Jason Dourisseau 24; Rebs: Dourisseau, Koenis 10; Asts: Arvin Slagter 4		Pts: Holcomb-Faye, Cunningham 16; Rebs: Duinker 5 Asts: de Jong, Holcomb-Faye 3

MartiniPlaza, Groningen
Attendance: 3.260

8 May 2014
20:00

Report

Zorg en Zekerheid Leiden	66–72	GasTerra Flames
Scoring by quarter: 14–18, 12–17, 26–16, 14–21
Pts: Mike Schachtner 21; Rebs: 3 spelers 5 Asts: Whit Holcomb-Faye 6		Pts: Ross Bekkering 28; Rebs: Ross Bekkering 10; Asts: Dourisseau, Pryor 3

Vijf Meihal, Leiden

NOS

11 May 2014
15:00

Report

GasTerra Flames	76–62	Zorg en Zekerheid Leiden
Scoring by quarter: 26–12, 14–14, 25–20, 17–16
Pts: Ross Bekkering 16; Rebs: Dan Coleman 8 Asts: Quentin Pryor 7		Pts: Whit Holcomb-Faye 18; Rebs: Thompson, de Jong 7 Asts: Mike Schachtner 2
Groningen wint met 3–2.

MartiniPlaza, Groningen
Attendance: 4.350

==== Finals: SPM Shoeters Den Bosch ====
13 May 2014
19:30

Report

GasTerra Flames	59–52	SPM Shoeters Den Bosch
Scoring by quarter: 9–10, 17–9, 13–20, 20–13
Pts: Slagter, Voorn 12; Rebs: Ross Bekkering 10; Asts: 3 spelers 2		Pts: Kees Akerboom jr. 20; Rebs: Wesley, Wessels 7 Asts: Tony Johnson 3

MartiniPlaza, Groningen
Attendance: 3.020

15 May 2014
20:00

Report

SPM Shoeters Den Bosch	77–67	GasTerra Flames
Scoring by quarter: 16–15, 16–20, 18–16, 27–16
Pts: Kees Akerboom jr. 18; Rebs: Tai Wesley 7 Asts: David Gonzalvez 4		Pts: Ross Bekkering 16; Rebs: Bekkering, Coleman 5 Asts: Jason Dourisseau 5

Maaspoort Sports & Events, 's-Hertogenbosch
Attendance: 1.900

17 May 2014
19:30

Report

GasTerra Flames	92–85	SPM Shoeters Den Bosch
Scoring by quarter: 19–22, 26–19, 23–16, 24–28
Pts: Cashmere Wright 31; Rebs: Thomas Koenis 7 Asts: Slagter, Wright 3		Pts: Tai Wesley 22; Rebs: Stefan Wessels 6 Asts: 4 spelers 3

MartiniPlaza, Groningen
Attendance: 3.840

22 May 2014
20:00

Report

SPM Shoeters Den Bosch	75–61	GasTerra Flames
Scoring by quarter: 20–12, 13–20, 23–14, 19–15
Pts: Wesley, Wessels 13; Rebs: Stefan Wessels 14; Asts: Tai Wesley 6		Pts: Cashmere Wright 21; Rebs: Ross Bekkering 7 Asts: Slagter, Wright 3

Maaspoort Sports & Events, 's-Hertogenbosch

25 May 2014
15:00

Report

GasTerra Flames	69–67	SPM Shoeters Den Bosch
Scoring by quarter: 14–12, 10–12, 18–22, 27–21
Pts: Arvin Slagter 14; Rebs: Jason Dourisseau 10; Asts: Arvin Slagter 3		Pts: Kees Akerboom jr. 18; Rebs: Stefan Wessels 12; Asts: Ali Farokhmanesh 4

MartiniPlaza, Groningen
Attendance: 4.350

RTV Noord

27 May 2014
19:00

Report

SPM Shoeters Den Bosch	69–63	GasTerra Flames
Scoring by quarter: 23–11, 9–13, 21–16, 16–23
Pts: Kees Akerboom jr. 22; Rebs: Stefan Wessels 10; Asts: Wessels, Wesley 3		Pts: Pryor, Slagter 14; Rebs: Dan Coleman 9 Asts: Arvin Slagter 6

Maaspoort Sports & Events, 's-Hertogenbosch

1 June 2014
13:00

Boxscore

GasTerra Flames	76–68	SPM Shoeters Den Bosch
Scoring by quarter: 21–20, 15–10, 24–11, 16–27
Pts: Jason Dourisseau 23; Rebs: Quentin Pryor 10; Asts: Quentin Pryor 6		Pts: Tai Wesley 15; Rebs: Stefan Wessels 8 Asts: Wesley, Johnson 4
GasTerra Flames wins series 4–3

MartiniPlaza, Groningen
Attendance: 4.310

== EuroChallenge ==
Groningen played the EuroChallenge, which was the first time back in Europe since the 2011–12 season. The team wasn't able to reach the last 16, as the Flames were able to win just 2 out of 6 games.

9 November 2013
19:30

Okapi Aalstar (Belgium)	83–82 (OT)	(Netherlands) GasTerra Flames
Scoring by quarter: 18–14, 18–15, 19–18, 19–27, Overtime: 9–8
Pts: Raivio 29; Rebs: Young 9 Asts: Releford 3		Pts: Robinson 21; Rebs: Robinson 9 Asts: Bekkering 3

Forum, Aalst
Attendance: 800
Referees: Haydn Jones, Anastasios Manos, Marko Vladic

9 November 2013
19:30

Pallacanestro Reggiana (Italy)	78–61	(Netherlands) GasTerra Flames
Scoring by quarter: 20–13, 12–20, 24–15, 22–13
Pts: Bunner 15; Rebs: Bunner 11; Asts: Cinciarini 6		Pts: Robinson 14; Rebs: Robinson, Koenis 6 Asts: Slagter 2

PalaBigi, Reggio Emilia
Attendance: 2,813
Referees: Johann Jeanneau (FRA), Nikolaos Somos (GRE), Bernard Vassallo (MLT)

25 November 2013

GasTerra Flames (Netherlands)	72–76	(Finland) Team TEHO Sport
Pts: Wright 15; Rebs: Robinson 9 Asts: Slagter 5		Pts: Ayers 24; Rebs: Ayers 6 Asts: Curry 9

Martiniplaza, Groningen
Attendance: 1,820

3 December 2013

Team TEHO Sport (Finland)	72–76	(Netherlands) GasTerra Flames
Pts: Wright 15; Rebs: Robinson 9 Asts: Slagter 5		Pts: Wright 15; Rebs: Robinson 8 Asts: Slagter, Koenis 3

Kotka
Attendance: 1,114

25 November 2013

GasTerra Flames (Netherlands)	63–70	(Belgium) Okapi Aalstar
Pts: Bekkering 13; Rebs: Slagter 7 Asts: Slagter 8		Pts: Cummard 23; Rebs: Young 6 Asts: Cummard 5

Martiniplaza, Groningen
Attendance: 3,340

17 December 2013

GasTerra Flames (Netherlands)	85–60	(Italy) Pallacanestro Reggiana
Pts: Robinson 20; Rebs: Robinson 6 Asts: Slagter 6		Pts: Bell 17; Rebs: Silins, Cervi 6 Asts: Cinciarini 6

Martiniplaza, Groningen
Attendance: 1,820
