= Donar past rosters =

This page shows all players of the professional basketball club Donar from Groningen, Netherlands from the period since 2011.

== List (2011–present) ==
| Pos | G | Guard | F | Forward | C | Center |
| No | Jersey number | | | | | |
| Yrs | Number of seasons played with Donar | | | | | |
| * | Denotes player who has been inducted to the Basketball Hall of Fame | | | | | |
| ^ | Denotes player who is currently on the Donar roster | | | | | |
| † | Denotes player who has spent his entire career with Donar | | | | | |
| ^{#} | Denotes a jersey number that was retired by Donar | | | | | |
| ^{≠} | Denotes player who left the season before the end | | | | | |

| Player | Nationality | Pos | No^{[a]} | Yrs | From^{[b]} | To^{[b]} | Notes and achievements^{[c]} | Ref. |
|---|---|---|---|---|---|---|---|---|
| Marquis Addison | USA | G | 34 | 1 | 2021 | 2022 | | |
| Sheyi Adetunji | NED | G | 3 | 3† | 2019 | 2022 | • Youth academy | |
| Nesta Agasi | NED | F | 1 | 1 | 2020 | 2021 | • Youth academy | |
| Yannick van der Ark | NED | G | 6 | 4† | 2010 | 2014 | • Youth academy | |
| David Bell | USA | G | 11 | 2 | 2011 | 2013^{≠} | • 2× DBL champion (2014, 2018) • DBL All-Star Team (2018) | |
| Ross Bekkering | NEDCAN | F/C | 12 | 3 | 2013 | 2016 | • 2× DBL champion (2014, 2016) • DBL All-Star Team (2016) | |
| Maarten Bouwknecht | NED | G | 7 | 2 | 2013 | 2015 | • Youth academy • DBL champion (2014) | |
| Jamal Boykin | USA | F | 7 | 1 | 2012 | 2013 | | |
| Reinier Brandsma | NED | C | 15 | 1 | 2018 | 2019 | • Youth academy | |
| Willem Brandwijk | NED | F/C | 19 | 2 | 2020 | 2022 | | |
| Ken Brown | USA | G | 2 | 1 | 2015 | 2016 | • DBL champion (2016) | |
| Evan Bruinsma | USA | F | 24 | 1 | 2017 | 2018 | • DBL champion (2018) • DBL All-Star Team (2018) | |
| Dražen Bubnić | SLOCRO | F | 11 | 1 | 2015 | 2016 | • DBL champion (2016) | |
| Bradford Burgess | USA | F/C | 23 | 1 | 2017 | 2018 | • DBL champion (2018) | |
| Jordan Callahan | USA | G | 30 | 1 | 2018 | 2019^{≠} | | |
| Henry Caruso | ITAUSA | F | 21 | 2 | 2020 | 2022 | | |
| Bill Clark | USA | G | 14 | 1 | 2014 | 2015 | | |
| Nick Cochran | CANGBR | G | 4 | 1 | 2014 | 2015^{≠} | | |
| Dan Coleman | USA | F | 22 | 1 | 2013 | 2014 | • DBL champion (2014) | |
| Sean Cunningham | USA; NED | G | 6 | 5 | 2014 | 2019 | • 3× DBL champion (2016–2018) • DBL Defensive Player of the Year (2018) | |
| Brandyn Curry | USA | G | 20 | 1 | 2017 | 2018 | • DBL champion (2018) • DBL MVP (2018) • DBL Play-offs MVP (2018) • DBL All-Star Team (2018) | |
| Bryan Davis | USA | C | 15 | 1 | 2011 | 2012^{≠} | | |
| Bryan Defares | NED | G | 14 | 1 | 2010 | 2011 | | |
| LaRon Dendy | USA | F/C | 23 | 1 | 2018 | 2019 | | |
| Tjoe de Paula | DOMNED | G | 5 | 1 | 2016 | 2017 | • DBL champion (2017) | |
| Sergio De Randamie | SUR | F | 5 | 2 | 2011 | 2013 | | |
| Sander de Roos | NED | G/F | 7 | 4† | 2008 | 2012 | • Youth academy | |
| Stephen Domingo | USA; NGR | G/F | 31 | 1 | 2017 | 2018 | • DBL champion (2018) | |
| Jason Dourisseau | USA; NED | G | 8^{#} | 10 | 2009 2015 | 2014 2020 | • 5× DBL champion (2010, 2014, 2016–2018) • DBL MVP (2011) • DBL All-Star Team (2011) | |
| Amanze Egekeze | USA; NGR | F | 12 | 1 | 2021 | 2022 | | |
| Chase Fieler | USA | F | 20 | 2 | 2015 | 2017 | • 2× DBL champion (2016, 2017) • DBL Play-offs MVP (2017) • DBL All-Star Team (2017) | |
| Yannick Franke | NED | G | 7 | 1 | 2015 | 2016^{≠} | | |
| Deshawn Freeman | USA | F | 6 | 1 | 2019 | 2020^{≠} | | |
| Jimmy Gavin | USA | G | 9 | 1 | 2021 | 2022 | | |
| Teddy Gipson | USA | G | 5 | 2 | 2017 | 2019 | • DBL champion (2018) | |
| Shane Hammink | NED | G/F | 11 | 2 | 2018 | 2020 | | |
| Tim Hoeve | NED | G/F | 21 | 1 | 2016 | 2017 | • Youth academy • DBL champion (2017) | |
| Yoeri Hoexum | NED | G/F | 7 | 1 | 2019 | 2020 | • Youth academy | |
| Mark-Peter Hof | NED | F | 13 | 4 | 2008 2013 | 2011 2014 | • Youth academy • 2× DBL champion (2010, 2014) | |
| Dexter Hope | NED | G | 5 | 1 | 2015 | 2016 | • DBL champion (2016) | |
| Dimeo van der Horst | NED | G | 13 | 1 | 2012 | 2013 | | |
| Donte Ingram | USA | F | 2 | 1 | 2021 | 2022 | | |
| Juwann James | USA | C | 33 | 1 | 2020 | 2021 | | |
| Rogier Jansen | NED | G | 4 14 | 5 | 2003 2007 2012 | 2005 2009 2013 | | |
| Lance Jeter | USA | G | 4 34 | 3 | 2014 2016 2018 | 2015 2017 2019 | • 2× DBL champion (2016, 2017) • 2× DBL MVP (2015, 2017) • DBL Play-offs MVP (2016) • 3× DBL All-Star Team (2015–2017) | |
| Michael Kingma | AUSNED | C | 14 | 1 | 2012 | 2013 | | |
| Craig Osaikhwuwuomwan | NED | C | 9 | 2 | 2013 | 2015 | • DBL champion (2014) | |
| Thomas Koenis | NED | C | 14 15 | 9 | 2011 2017 | 2015 2022 | • 2× DBL champion (2014, 2018) • DBL All-Star Team (2018) | |
| Sjoerd Koopmans | NED | G/F | 6 | 2 | 2016 | 2018 | • Youth academy • 2× DBL champion (2017, 2018) | |
| DaVonté Lacy | USA | G | 7 | 1 | 2020 | 2021 | | |
| Carrington Love | USA | G | 12 | 1 | 2019 | 2020 | | |
| Austin Luke | USA | G | 1 | 1 | 2021 | 2022 | | |
| Tommy Mason-Griffin | USA | G | 2 | 1 | 2015 | 2016^{≠} | | |
| Daan Maring | NED | F/C | 12 | 1 | 2016 | 2017 | • Youth academy • 2× DBL champion (2017, 2018) | |
| Rienk Mast | NED | F/C | 15 | 2 | 2017 | 2019 | • Youth academy • DBL champion (2018) • DBL MVP Under 23 (2019) | |
| Matt McCarthy | AUS | C | 33 | 1 | 2019 | 2020 | | |
| Kevin McCleery | NEDCAN | C | 12 | 1 | 2011 | 2012 | | |
| Maurice Miller | USA | G | 4 | 1 | 2012 | 2013^{≠} | | |
| Stefan Mladenović | NEDSRB | G | 7 | 3 | 2007 2014 2016 | 2008 2015 2017 | • Youth academy • DBL champion (2017) | |
| Will Moreton | USA | G | 22 | 1 | 2020 | 2021 | | |
| Niek Nieboer | NED | G | 6 | 1† | 2015 | 2016 | • Youth academy • DBL champion (2016) | |
| Lotanna Nwogbo | NGRUSA | C | 24 | 1 | 2021 | 2022 | | |
| Jarred Ogungbemi-Jackson | CANJAM | G | 3 | 1 | 2020 | 2021 | • DBL All-Star Team (2021) | |
| Drago Pašalić | CRO | C | 33 | 3 | 2016 | 2019 | • 2× DBL champion (2017, 2018) • DBL All-Star Team (2017) | |
| Eric Peutz | NED | F | 22 | 1† | 2014 | 2015 | • Youth academy | |
| Quentin Pryor | USA | G | 14 | 1 | 2013 | 2014 | • DBL champion (2014) | |
| Benny van der Reijden | NED | C | 23 | 1 | 2013 | 2014 | • Youth academy • DBL champion (2014) | |
| Mark Ridderhof | NED | G | 8 | 1 | 2014 | 2015 | | |
| Jeff Robinson | USA | F | 5 | 1 | 2013 | 2014^{≠} | | |
| Nate Rohnert | USA | G | 4 | 1 | 2012 | 2013 | | |
| Mark Roorda | NED | F | 27 | 1 | 2021 | 2022 | • Youth academy | |
| Aron Royé | NED | G | 3 | 4 | 2008 2017 | 2011 2018^{≠} | • DBL champion (2010) | |
| Damjan Rudež | CRO | F | 9 | 1 | 2020 | 2021 | | |
| Skip Samson | NEDUSA | G | 4 | 1 | 2015 | 2016 | • DBL champion (2016) | |
| Mark Sanchez | USA; MEX | F | 5 | 1 | 2014 | 2015 | | |
| Max van Schaik | NED | F | 10 | 1 | 2011 | 2012 | | |
| Jeffrey Sedoc | NED | F | 28 | 1† | 2019 | 2020 | • Youth academy | |
| Garrick Sherman | USA | C | 11 | 1 | 2015 | 2016^{≠} | • DBL champion (2016) | |
| Grant Sitton | USA | F | 00 | 1 | 2018 | 2019 | | |
| Arvin Slagter | NED | G | 4 44 | 4 | 2013 2016 | 2014 2019 | • 3× DBL champion (2014, 2017, 2018) • DBL MVP (2014) • DBL All-Star Team (2014) | |
| Drew Smith | USA; LAT | C | 11 | 2 | 2016 2019 | 2017 2020 | • DBL champion (2017) | |
| Will Sullivan | USA | G | 3 | 1 | 2015 | 2016 | • DBL champion (2016) | |
| Vernon Taylor | USA | G | 42 | 1 | 2019 | 2020 | | |
| Ties Theeuwkens | NED | G/F | 9 | 2 | 2011 | 2013 | | |
| Donte Thomas | USA | F | 1 0 | 2 | 2019 2021 | 2020 2022 | | |
| Bas Veenstra | NED | F | 9 | 3 | 2014 | 2017 | • DBL champion (2017) | |
| Jessey Voorn | NED | G | 21 | 3 | 2011 | 2014 | • DBL champion (2014) • DBL MVP Under 23 (2013) | |
| Jef de Vries | NED | G | 9 | 1 | 2019 | 2020 | • Youth academy | |
| Jobi Wall | USA | F | 3 | 1 | 2018 | 2019^{≠} | | |
| Justin Watts | USA | F | 24 | 1 | 2020 | 2021 | | |
| Leon Williams^ | NED | G | 5 | 3 | 2019 | 2022 | | |
| Matt Williams Jr. | USA | G | 0 | 1 | 2019 | 2020 | | |
| Alex Wesby | USA | G | 4 | 1 | 2011 | 2012 | | |
| Cashmere Wright | USA | G | 11 | 1 | 2013 | 2014 | • DBL champion (2014) | |
| DeJuan Wright | USA | G | 11 | 1 | 2014 | 2015 | | |
| Avis Wyatt | USA | F/C | 14 | 1 | 2011 | 2012 | | |
| Kjeld Zuidema^ | NED | F | 32 | 2 | 2020 | 2026 | • Youth academy | |

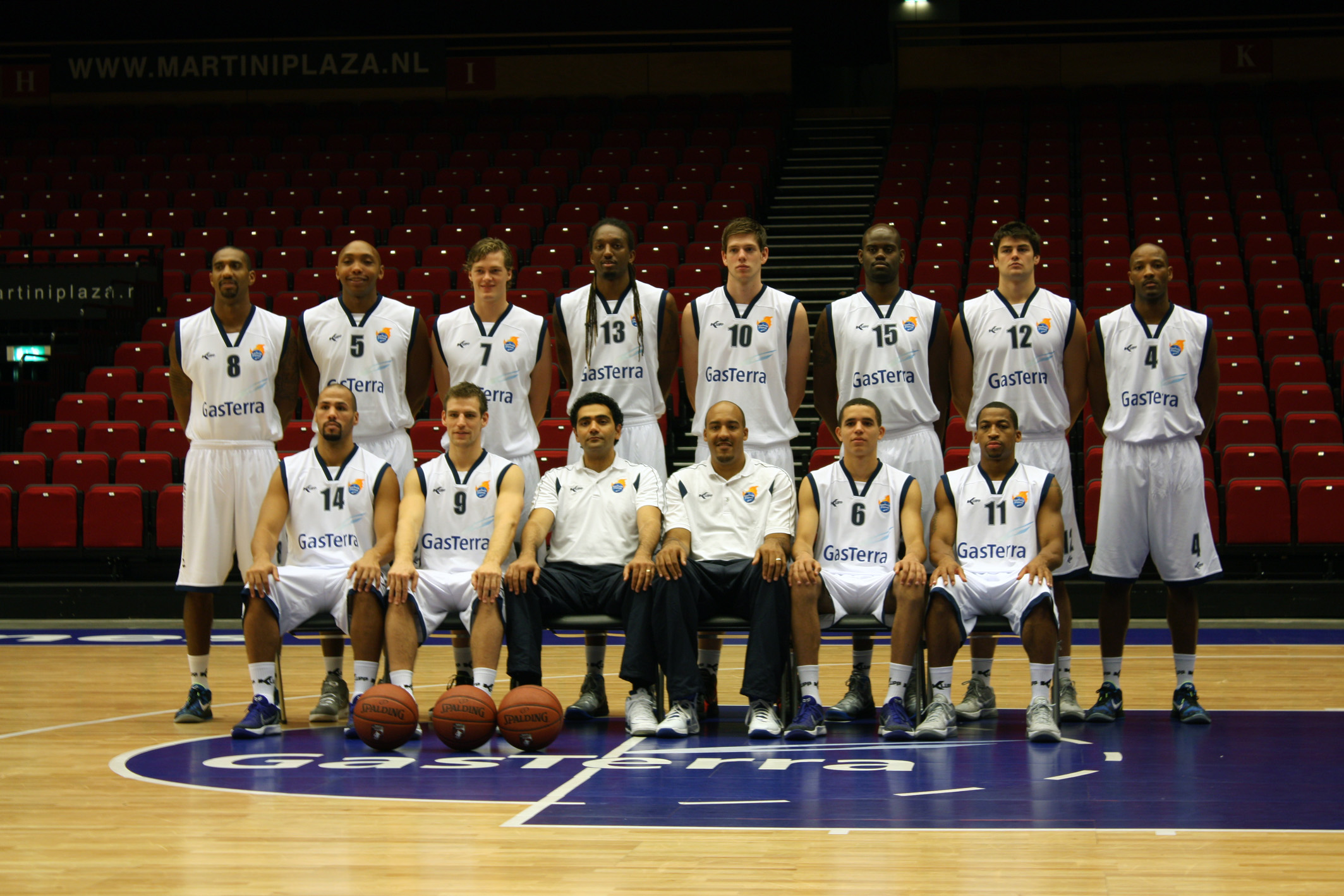
Squad for the 2011–2012 season
