= 2014 DBL All-Star Gala =

All-star game in the Dutch Basketball League

The 2014 DBL All-Star Gala was an all-star game event organised by the Dutch Basketball League (DBL). It consisted of the best players of the 2013–14 DBL season. The event was held on 23 February 2014 in the KingsDome in Den Helder.

== All-star game ==
Best Dutch players
Pos.	Player	Team	No of selections	Votes
Starters
G	(Netherlands) Arvin Slagter	GasTerra Flames	4	378
G	(Netherlands) Leon Williams	Landstede Basketbal	1	289
F	(Netherlands) Kees Akerboom, Jr.	SPM Shoeters Den Bosch	8	473
F	(Netherlands) Stefan Wessels	SPM Shoeters Den Bosch	5	329
C	(Netherlands) (Canada) Ross Bekkering	GasTerra Flames	3	288
Reserves
G	(Netherlands) (United States) Sean Cunningham	Zorg en Zekerheid Leiden	1	–
G	(Netherlands) Rogier Jansen	Den Helder Kings	2	–
G	(Netherlands) Worthy de Jong	Zorg en Zekerheid Leiden	3	–
G	(Netherlands) Aron Royé	BC Apollo	2	–
F	(Netherlands) Jeroen van der List	Den Helder Kings	2	–
C	(Netherlands) (Australia) Joshua Duinker	Zorg en Zekerheid Leiden	1	–
C	(Netherlands) Kenneth van Kempen	Maxxcom BSW	2	–
Coaches: (Netherlands) (United States) Sam Jones (SPM Shoeters Den Bosch) and (Netherlands) Toon van Helfteren (Zorg en Zekerheid Leiden)

Best foreign players
Pos.	Player	Team	No of selections	Votes
Starters
G	(United States) La'Shard Anderson	Challenge Sports Rotterdam	1	476
G	(United States) Cashmere Wright	GasTerra Flames	1	422
F	(United States) Jason Dourisseau	GasTerra Flames	4	479
F	(United States) Justin Stommes	Landstede Basketbal	1	427
C	(United States) Tai Wesley	SPM Shoeters Den Bosch	2	591
Reserves
G	(United States) Darius Theus	Aris Leeuwarden	1	–
G	(United States) David Gonzalvez	SPM Shoeters Den Bosch	2	–
G	(United States) (Puerto Rico) Emanuel Ubilla	Den Helder Kings	1	–
F	(United States) Patrick Richard	Matrixx Magixx	1	–
F	(United States) Dan Coleman	GasTerra Flames	1	–
F	(United States) Holden Greiner	Landstede Basketbal	1	–
C	(United States) Justin Knox	Den Helder Kings	1	–
Coaches: (Croatia) Ivica Skelin (GasTerra Flames) and (Belgium) Jean-Marc Jaumin (Den Helder Kings)

The Dutch players won the game, Jeroen van der List was voted the All-Star Game MVP.

== U23 all-star game ==
Team Noord
Pos.	Player	Team
Players
G	Dexter Hope	Aris Leeuwarden
G	Jos van der Laan	BC Apollo
G	Leon Williams^{1}	Landstede Basketbal
G	Yannick van der Ark	GasTerra Flames
G	Valentijn Lietmeijer	Landstede Basketbal
F	Joël Brandt	BC Apollo
F	Gian Slagter	BC Apollo
F	Steve Bleeker	Den Helder Kings
C	Max van Schaik	Den Helder Kings
C	Quincy Treffers	Den Helder Kings
C	Benny van der Reijden	GasTerra Flames
Coach: Hakim Salem (BC Apollo)

Team South
Pos.	Player	Team
Spelers
G	Yannick Franke	Challenge Sports Rotterdam
G	Dimeo van der Horst	Matrixx Magixx
G	Mike Schilder	SPM Shoeters Den Bosch
G	Kasper Averink	Zorg en Zekerheid Leiden
F	Akeel Eduardo	Maxxcom BSW
F	Stefan Mulder	Maxxcom BSW
F	Joost Padberg^{Injured}	Maxxcom BSW
F	Don Rigters	Challenge Sports Rotterdam
F	Matthew van Tongeren	Matrixx Magixx
F	Pim de Vries	SPM Shoeters Den Bosch
C	Roel Aarts	Maxxcom BSW
Coach: Niels Vorenhout (Maxxcom BSW)

^{1} Williams didn't play because he was also selected for the all-star game. Team North won the contest, Quincy Treffers was voted the MVP.

== Three point contest ==
The top 8 shooters in the 2013–14 DBL season were selected.

- (Netherlands) Arvin Slagter (GasTerra Flames) with 49,4%
- (United States) Raymond Cowels III (Den Helder Kings with 47,5%
- (Netherlands) Kees Akerboom, Jr. (SPM Shoeters Den Bosch) with 47,3%
- (Netherlands) Thijs Vermeulen (Matrixx Magixx) with 42,9%
- (United States) Justin Stommes (Landstede Basketbal) with 42,3%
- (United States) David Gonzalvez (SPM Shoeters Den Bosch) with 41,3%
- (United States) Sean Cunningham (Zorg en Zekerheid Leiden) with 40,2%
- (Netherlands) Tjoe de Paula (Aris Leeuwarden) with 39,3%

Arvin Slagter won the contest.

== Dunk contest ==
Van der List won the Dunk contest by beating Kelvin Martin and Ross Bekkering in the Final.
