= 2014–15 Dutch Basketball League/squads =

Nine teams competed in the 2014–15 Dutch Basketball League.

== Note ==
As of 14 December 2014.

Note: Flags indicate national team eligibility at FIBA-sanctioned events. Players may hold other non-FIBA nationalities not displayed.

BC Apollo Amsterdam

BC Apollo roster
Players
Coaches

Pos.	No.	Nat.	Name
PF	14	(Netherlands)	van Stein, Harvey
F/C	10	(Netherlands)	van Schaik, Max
PG	13	(Netherlands)	van der Horst, Dimeo
G	8	(Netherlands)	Mulder, Stefan
G/F	9	(Netherlands)	Slagter, Gian
G	6	(Netherlands)	Candiff, Paul
F	11	(United States)	Keely, Reggie
G	4	(Netherlands)	Kherrazi, Hicham
SG	5	(Netherlands)	van der Laan, Jos
G	7	(Netherlands)	Chaoui, Rani
SF	11	(Netherlands)	Jaring, Julian

Head coach

(Estonia) Jaanus Liivak

Assistant coach(es)

(Netherlands) Patrick Faydherbe

Legend

- (C) Team captain
- Injured

- Roster
Updated: 16/10/2014

Donar Groningen

Donar roster
Players
Coaches

Pos.	No.	Nat.	Name
G	7	(Netherlands)	Bouwknecht, Maarten
PF	12	(Canada) (Netherlands)	Bekkering, Ross
C	15	(Netherlands)	Koenis, Thomas
SF	9	(Netherlands)	Veenstra, Bas
F	5	(United States)	Sanchez, Mark
G	6	(Netherlands) (United States)	Cunningham, Sean
PF	9	(Netherlands)	Osaikhwuwuomwan, Craig
SG	8	(Netherlands)	Ridderhof, Mark
C	23	(Netherlands)	van der Reijden, Benny
PG	21	(Netherlands)	Löwik, Daan
F	22	(Netherlands)	Peutz, Eric
CG	4	(United States)	Jeter, Lance
SG	11	(United States)	Wright, DeJuan

Head coach

(Croatia) Ivica Skelin

Assistant coach(es)

(Netherlands) Anjo Mekel

Legend

- (C) Team captain
- Injured

- Roster
Updated: 28 September 2014

Aris Leeuwarden

Aris Leeuwarden roster
Players
Coaches

Pos.	No.	Nat.	Name	Ht.
PF	11	(Netherlands)	Visser, Jelmer	2.02 m (6 ft 8 in)
SG	5	(Netherlands)	de Paula, Tjoe	1.85 m (6 ft 1 in)
PG	8	(Netherlands)	Hope, Dexter	1.85 m (6 ft 1 in)
PF	12	(Netherlands)	Treffers, Quincy	2.02 m (6 ft 8 in)
CG	15	(Netherlands) (United Kingdom)	Van Oostrum, Nigel	1.96 m (6 ft 5 in)
SF	10	(Netherlands) (France)	Bach, Philip	1.94 m (6 ft 4 in)
SF	14	(Norway)	Sommerfeldt, Torgrim	1.98 m (6 ft 6 in)
C	7	(United States)	Watkins, Ryan	2.06 m (6 ft 9 in)
PF	6	(United States)	Simmons, Marquise	2.01 m (6 ft 7 in)
PG	9	(United States)	Jackson-Cartwright, Miles	1.90 m (6 ft 3 in)
C	13	(Netherlands)	Pijp, Rik	2.05 m (6 ft 9 in)

Head coach

(Netherlands) Tom Simpson

Legend

- (C) Team captain
- Injured

- Roster
Updated: 16/11/2014

Port of Den Helder Kings

Den Helder Kings roster
Players
Coaches

Pos.	No.	Nat.	Name	Ht.
PG	4	(Netherlands)	Landman, Kevin	1.85 m (6 ft 1 in)
C	7	(Netherlands)	Essenstam, Luke	2.06 m (6 ft 9 in)
F	9	(Netherlands) (United States)	Smith, Jamal	1.97 m (6 ft 6 in)
SF	8	(Netherlands)	Bleeker, Steve	1.93 m (6 ft 4 in)
G	7	(United Kingdom) (Netherlands)	Van Oostrum, Nigel	1.96 m (6 ft 5 in)
G/F	11	(Netherlands)	Rigters, Don	1.93 m (6 ft 4 in)
PF	12	(Netherlands)	Treffers, Quincy	2.02 m (6 ft 8 in)
PF	10	(Suriname)	de Randamie, Sergio	2.01 m (6 ft 7 in)
C	15	(Netherlands)	Halman, Dyon	2.03 m (6 ft 8 in)
PG	5	(United States)	Frazier, Branden	1.90 m (6 ft 3 in)
SG	8	(United States)	Creek, Maurice	1.96 m (6 ft 5 in)
PF	14	(United States)	Dickerson, Cole	2.01 m (6 ft 7 in)
C	13	(Netherlands)	Hilliman, Patrick	2.06 m (6 ft 9 in)

Head coach

(Belgium) Jean-Marc Jaumin

Assistant coach(es)

(Netherlands) Mike Nahar

Legend

- (C) Team captain
- Injured

- Roster
Updated: 16/10/2014

Maxxcom BSW Weert

Maxxcom BSW roster
Players
Coaches

Pos.	No.	Nat.	Name
C	15	(Netherlands)	van Kempen, Kenneth
G	8	(Netherlands)	Ormskerk, Jeremy
PF	9	(Netherlands)	Padberg, Joost
G	10	(Netherlands)	Eduardo, Akeel
PF	13	(Netherlands)	Aarts, Roel
SF	13	(Netherlands)	Rosenmuller, Daan
F	11	(Netherlands)	Hamers, Kamiel
G	7	(Netherlands)	Faye, Mactar

Head coach

(Netherlands) Niels Vorenhout

Legend

- (C) Team captain
- Injured

- Roster
Updated: 16/11/2014

Landstede Basketbal Zwolle

Landstede Basketbal roster
Players
Coaches

Pos.	No.	Nat.	Name	Ht.
PG	4	(United States)	Tiller, J.T.	1.92 m (6 ft 4 in)
G	5	(Netherlands)	Williams, Leon	1.89 m (6 ft 2 in)
F	6	(Netherlands)	Witteveen, Lenno	1.97 m (6 ft 6 in)
G/F	7	(United States)	Gibbs, Grant	1.95 m (6 ft 5 in)
PF	8	(Netherlands)	Hulzebos, Nikki	2.09 m (6 ft 10 in)
PF	9	(Netherlands)	Tönjann, Torben	2.03 m (6 ft 8 in)
SG	10	(Netherlands)	Lietmeijer, Valentijn	1.91 m (6 ft 3 in)
G	11	(Netherlands)	van Veen, Emil	1.92 m (6 ft 4 in)
PF	15	(Canada)	Hinz, Tyson	2.01 m (6 ft 7 in)
C	13	(Netherlands)	Zondervan, Kenrick	2.06 m (6 ft 9 in)
G	14	(Netherlands)	Kloos, Ewoud	1.85 m (6 ft 1 in)
C	12	(United States)	Burton, Joe	2.01 m (6 ft 7 in)

Head coach

(Netherlands) Herman van den Belt

Assistant coach(es)

(Netherlands) Mark van Schutterhoef
(Netherlands) Rein van der Kamp

Legend

- (C) Team captain
- Injured

- Roster
Updated: 24 August 2014
