= 2014 DBL Playoffs =

Tournament details
- Country: Netherlands
- Dates: 24 April – 1 June 2014
- Season: 2013–14
- Teams: 8
- Defending champions: ZZ Leiden

Final positions
- Champions: GasTerra Flames (4th title)
- Runner-up: SPM Shoeters Den Bosch
- Semifinalists: ZZ Leiden; Port of Den Helder Kings

Tournament statistics
- Matches played: 24

The 2014 DBL Playoffs was the postseason tournament of the Dutch Basketball League's (DBL) 2013–14 season. The tournament concluded with GasTerra Flames playing SPM Shoeters Den Bosch in the Final. The Playoffs started on 24 April and ended 1 June 2014.

Apollo Amsterdam made the postseason tournament for the first time in club history.

== Playoff qualifying ==
Pos	Team	Pld	W	L	PF	PA	PD	Pts	Seeding
1	GasTerra Flames	36	32	4	2759	2141	+618	64	Seeded teams
2	SPM Shoeters Den Bosch	36	29	7	2865	2382	+483	58	Seeded teams
3	Den Helder Kings	36	24	12	199	150	+49	48	Seeded teams
4	ZZ Leiden	36	22	14	2732	2512	+220	44 (Note: ZZ Leiden won 3–1 head-to-head vs Landstede.)	Seeded teams
5	Landstede	36	22	14	2807	2559	+248	44	Unseeded teams
6	Matrixx Magixx	36	20	16	249	249	0	40	Unseeded teams
7	Aris Leeuwarden	36	13	23	2759	2996	−237	26	Unseeded teams
8	Apollo Amsterdam	36	7	29	2144	2702	−558	14	Unseeded teams

Source: DBL

== Quarterfinals ==
=== (1) GasTerra Flames – (8) Apollo Amsterdam ===
24 April 2014	GasTerra Flames	81–62 (Series: 1–0)	Apollo Amsterdam	MartiniPlaza, Groningen
19:30	Scoring by quarter: 36–19, 15–12, 14–19, 16–12
	Pts: Dan Coleman 20; Rebs: Thomas Koenis 8 Asts: Cashmere Wright 4	Report	Pts: Mark Ridderhof 24; Rebs: Lucas Steijn 7 Asts: Aron Royé 5	Attendance: 2.850

27 April 2014	Apollo Amsterdam	58–71 (Series: 0–2)	GasTerra Flames	Apollohal, Amsterdam
11:00	Scoring by quarter: 7–16, 9–21, 20–21, 22–13
	Pts: Aron Royé 22; Rebs: 3 spelers 5 Asts: Jeffrey de Vries Andries 4	Report	Pts: Arvin Slagter 14; Rebs: Thomas Koenis 11; Asts: Cashmere Wright 5

=== (2) SPM Shoeters Den Bosch – (7) Aris Leeuwarden ===
24 April 2014	SPM Shoeters Den Bosch	110–63 (Series: 1–0)	Aris Leeuwarden	Maaspoort Sports & Events, 's-Hertogenbosch
20:00	Scoring by quarter: 26–16, 40–17, 26–12, 18–18
	Pts: Ali Farokhmanesh 22; Rebs: Stefan Wessels 11; Asts: Wesley, Johnson 7	Report	Pts: de Paula, Healy 13; Rebs: Stephen Lumpkins 6 Asts: Darius Theus 6

27 April 2014	Aris Leeuwarden	80–88 (Series: 0–2)	SPM Shoeters Den Bosch	Sportcentrum Kalverdijkje, Leeuwarden
17:00	Scoring by quarter: 15–19, 24–21, 18–29, 23–19
	Pts: Nathan Healy 26; Rebs: Stephen Lumpkins 14; Asts: Darius Theus 6	Report	Pts: Kees Akerboom jr. 19; Rebs: Tai Wesley 11; Asts: Tai Wesley 5

=== (3) Port of Den Helder Kings – (6) Matrixx Magixx ===
24 April 2014	Port of Den Helder Kings	77–65 (Series: 1–0)	Matrixx Magixx	KingsDome, Den Helder
19:30	Scoring by quarter: 11–14, 19–21, 28–17, 19–13
	Pts: Rogier Jansen 26; Rebs: Emanuel Ubilla 7 Asts: Emanuel Ubilla 12	Report	Pts: Kelvin Martin 17; Rebs: Patrick Richard 7 Asts: Patrick Richard 5

27 April 2014	Matrixx Magixx	68–83 (Series: 0–2)	Port of Den Helder Kings	Sportcentrum De Arcus, Wijchen
16:00	Scoring by quarter: 19–24, 19–15, 16–25, 14–19
	Pts: Patrick Richard 23; Rebs: Robbie Sihota 11; Asts: Patrick Richard 3	Report	Pts: Jansen, Knox 15; Rebs: Jeroen van der List 8 Asts: Emanuel Ubilla 5

=== (4) Zorg en Zekerheid Leiden – (5) Landstede Basketbal ===
24 April 2014	Zorg en Zekerheid Leiden	77–58 (Series: 1–0)	Landstede Basketbal	Vijf Meihal, Leiden
20:00	Scoring by quarter: 25–17, 21–11, 17–12, 14–18
	Pts: Whit Holcomb-Faye 20; Rebs: Joshua Duinker 7 Asts: Sean Cunningham 5	Report	Pts: Nikki Hulzebos 13; Rebs: J.T. Tiller 9 Asts: J.T. Tiller 10

27 April 2014	Landstede Basketbal	78–77 (Series: 1–1)	Zorg en Zekerheid Leiden	Landstede Sportcentrum, Zwolle
15:00	Scoring by quarter: 21–16, 26–19, 19–20, 12–22
	Pts: Holden Greiner 20; Rebs: Kenrick Zondervan 11; Asts: J.T. Tiller 6	Report	Pts: DeJuan Wright 22; Rebs: DeJuan Wright 7 Asts: Whit Holcomb-Faye 4

29 April 2014	Zorg en Zekerheid Leiden	61–57 (Series: 2–1)	Landstede Basketbal	Vijf Meihal, Leiden
20:00	Scoring by quarter: 12–10, 15–17, 19–10, 15–20
	Pts: DeJuan Wright 20; Rebs: Joshua Duinker 12; Asts: de Jong, Cunningham 2	Report	Pts: Holden Greiner 15; Rebs: Hulzebos, Zondervan 7 Asts: Justin Stommes 4

== Semifinals ==
=== (1) GasTerra Flames – (4) Zorg en Zekerheid Leiden ===
1 May 2014	GasTerra Flames	44–73 (Series: 0–1)	Zorg en Zekerheid Leiden	MartiniPlaza, Groningen
19:30	Scoring by quarter: 11–15, 8–16, 11–21, 14–21
	Pts: Jason Dourisseau 11; Rebs: Ross Bekkering 8 Asts: Cashmere Wright 3	Report	Pts: Mike Schachtner 13; Rebs: DeJuan Wright 8 Asts: Whit Holcomb-Faye 5

3 May 2014	Zorg en Zekerheid Leiden	62–59OT (Series: 2–0)	GasTerra Flames	Vijf Meihal, Leiden
20:30	Scoring by quarter: 18–18, 9–7, 15–17, 11–11, Overtime: 11–11
	Pts: DeJuan Wright 19; Rebs: de Jong, Duinker 7 Asts: Whit Holcomb-Faye 6	Report	Pts: Jason Dourisseau 14; Rebs: Ross Bekkering 12; Asts: Jason Dourisseau 3	Attendance: 2.000

6 May 2014	GasTerra Flames	74–66 (Series: 1–2)	Zorg en Zekerheid Leiden	MartiniPlaza, Groningen
19:30	Scoring by quarter: 20–15, 11–14, 20–23, 23–14
	Pts: Jason Dourisseau 24; Rebs: Dourisseau, Koenis 10; Asts: Arvin Slagter 4	Report	Pts: Holcomb-Faye, Cunningham 16; Rebs: Duinker 5 Asts: de Jong, Holcomb-Faye 3	Attendance: 3.260

8 May 2014	Zorg en Zekerheid Leiden	66–72 (Series: 2–2)	GasTerra Flames	Vijf Meihal, Leiden
20:00	Scoring by quarter: 14–18, 12–17, 26–16, 14–21
	Pts: Mike Schachtner 21; Rebs: 3 spelers 5 Asts: Whit Holcomb-Faye 6	Report	Pts: Ross Bekkering 28; Rebs: Ross Bekkering 10; Asts: Dourisseau, Pryor 3

11 May 2014	GasTerra Flames	76–62 (Series: 3–2)	Zorg en Zekerheid Leiden	MartiniPlaza, Groningen
15:00	Scoring by quarter: 26–12, 14–14, 25–20, 17–16
	Pts: Ross Bekkering 16; Rebs: Dan Coleman 8 Asts: Quentin Pryor 7	Report	Pts: Whit Holcomb-Faye 18; Rebs: Thompson, de Jong 7 Asts: Mike Schachtner 2	Attendance: 4.350

=== (2) SPM Shoeters Den Bosch – (3) Den Helder Kings ===
1 May 2014	SPM Shoeters Den Bosch	89–78 (Series: 1–0)	Port of Den Helder Kings	Maaspoort Sports & Events, 's-Hertogenbosch
20:00	Scoring by quarter: 20–15, 25–17, 20–20, 24–26
	Pts: Kees Akerboom jr. 17; Rebs: Stefan Wessels 11; Asts: Tai Wesley 15	Report	Pts: Emanuel Ubilla 23; Rebs: Justin Knox 7 Asts: Rogier Jansen 6

4 May 2014	Port of Den Helder Kings	73–81 (Series: 0–2)	SPM Shoeters Den Bosch	Kingsdome, Den Helder
14:00	Scoring by quarter: 24–16, 27–23, 13–15, 9–27
	Pts: Jeroen van der List 21; Rebs: Emanuel Ubilla 9 Asts: Emanuel Ubilla 6	Report	Pts: Ali Farokhmanesh 17; Rebs: Stefan Wessels 7 Asts: Tony Johnson 7

6 May 2014	SPM Shoeters Den Bosch	89–68 (Series: 3–0)	Port of Den Helder Kings	Maaspoort Sports & Events, 's-Hertogenbosch
20:00	Scoring by quarter: 24–18, 20–10, 27–19, 18–21
	Pts: Kees Akerboom jr. 20; Rebs: Stefan Wessels 9 Asts: Tai Wesley 5	Report	Pts: Emanuel Ubilla 17; Rebs: Quincy Treffers 6 Asts: Emanuel Ubilla 6	Attendance: 2.800

== Finals ==
=== (1) GasTerra Flames – (2) SPM Shoeters Den Bosch ===
13 May 2014	GasTerra Flames	59–52 (Series: 1–0)	SPM Shoeters Den Bosch	MartiniPlaza, Groningen
19:30	Scoring by quarter: 9–10, 17–9, 13–20, 20–13
	Pts: Slagter, Voorn 12; Rebs: Ross Bekkering 10; Asts: 3 spelers 2	Report	Pts: Kees Akerboom jr. 20; Rebs: Wesley, Wessels 7 Asts: Tony Johnson 3	Attendance: 3.020

15 May 2014	SPM Shoeters Den Bosch	77–67 (Series: 1–1)	GasTerra Flames	Maaspoort Sports & Events, 's-Hertogenbosch
20:00	Scoring by quarter: 16–15, 16–20, 18–16, 27–16
	Pts: Kees Akerboom jr. 18; Rebs: Tai Wesley 7 Asts: David Gonzalvez 4	Report	Pts: Ross Bekkering 16; Rebs: Bekkering, Coleman 5 Asts: Jason Dourisseau 5	Attendance: 1.900

17 May 2014	GasTerra Flames	92–85 (Series: 2–1)	SPM Shoeters Den Bosch	MartiniPlaza, Groningen
19:30	Scoring by quarter: 19–22, 26–19, 23–16, 24–28
	Pts: Cashmere Wright 31; Rebs: Thomas Koenis 7 Asts: Slagter, Wright 3	Report	Pts: Tai Wesley 22; Rebs: Stefan Wessels 6 Asts: 4 spelers 3	Attendance: 3.840

22 May 2014	SPM Shoeters Den Bosch	75–61 (Series: 2–2)	GasTerra Flames	Maaspoort Sports & Events, 's-Hertogenbosch
20:00	Scoring by quarter: 20–12, 13–20, 23–14, 19–15
	Pts: Wesley, Wessels 13; Rebs: Stefan Wessels 14; Asts: Tai Wesley 6	Report	Pts: Cashmere Wright 21; Rebs: Ross Bekkering 7 Asts: Slagter, Wright 3

25 May 2014	GasTerra Flames	69–67 (Series: 3–2)	SPM Shoeters Den Bosch	MartiniPlaza, Groningen
15:00	Scoring by quarter: 14–12, 10–12, 18–22, 27–21
	Pts: Arvin Slagter 14; Rebs: Jason Dourisseau 10; Asts: Arvin Slagter 3	Report	Pts: Kees Akerboom jr. 18; Rebs: Stefan Wessels 12; Asts: Ali Farokhmanesh 4	Attendance: 4.350

27 May 2014	SPM Shoeters Den Bosch	69–63 (Series: 3–3)	GasTerra Flames	Maaspoort Sports & Events, 's-Hertogenbosch
19:00	Scoring by quarter: 23–11, 9–13, 21–16, 16–23
	Pts: Kees Akerboom jr. 22; Rebs: Stefan Wessels 10; Asts: Wessels, Wesley 3	Report	Pts: Pryor, Slagter 14; Rebs: Dan Coleman 9 Asts: Arvin Slagter 6

1 June 2014	GasTerra Flames	76–68 (Series: 4–3)	SPM Shoeters Den Bosch	MartiniPlaza, Groningen
13:00	Scoring by quarter: 21–20, 15–10, 24–11, 16–27
	Pts: Jason Dourisseau 23; Rebs: Quentin Pryor 10; Asts: Quentin Pryor 6	Boxscore	Pts: Tai Wesley 15; Rebs: Stefan Wessels 8 Asts: Wesley, Johnson 4	Attendance: 4.310
