= Stefan Mladenović =

Serbian-Dutch basketball player

Personal information
- Born: June 28, 1990 (age 36) Belgrade, SR Serbia, SFR Yugoslavia
- Listed height: 188 cm (6 ft 2 in)
- Listed weight: 90 kg (198 lb)

Career information
- NBA draft: 2012: undrafted
- Playing career: 2007–present
- Position: Point guard / shooting guard

Career history
- 2007–2008: Donar
- 2011–2012: Rotterdam
- 2012–2013: Den Helder Kings
- 2013–2014: Matrixx Magixx
- 2014–2015: Donar
- 2015–2016: Rotterdam
- 2016–2017: Donar
- 2017–2018: Aris Leeuwarden
- 2018–2019: AV Ohrid
- 2019–2020: Rabotnički

Career highlights
- DBL champion (2017)

Stefan Mladenović (born June 28, 1990) is a Serbian-Dutch professional basketball player, who last played for Rabotnički. Standing at 188 cm (6 ft 2 in), he primarily plays as guard. He spent several years playing in the Netherlands, winning the national championship in 2017.

== Early life ==
Mladenović was born in Belgrade, Serbia. He and his family moved to Groningen, Netherlands, when he was 8. He also holds Macedonian citizenship.

== Professional career ==
Mladenović spent four seasons with Donar, during three different periods. In the 2016–17 season, he won the Dutch Basketball League with Donar.

== International career ==
Mladenović made his debut for the Netherlands men's national basketball team on 19 July 2013 against Switzerland. He played in a total of seven national team games over his career.
