= Ties Theeuwkens =

Dutch basketball player

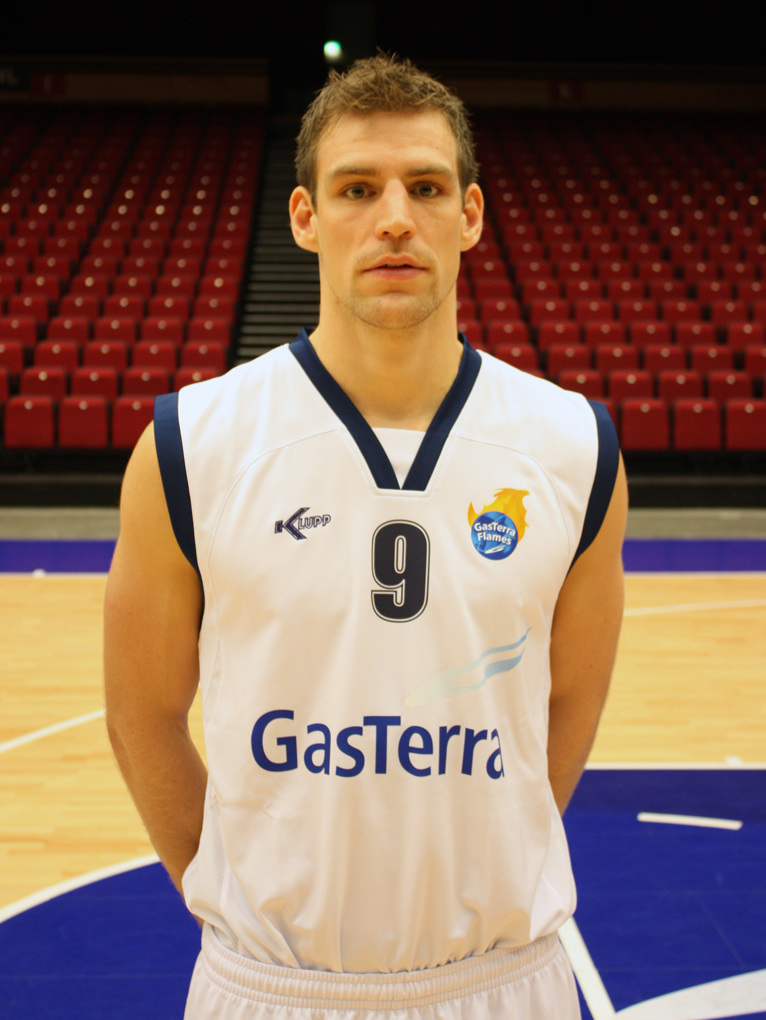
- Theeuwkens in his GasTerra Flames jersey in 2011

Personal information
- Born: 15 January 1985 (age 41) Barendrecht, Netherlands
- Listed height: 1.90 m (6 ft 3 in)
- Listed weight: 85 kg (187 lb)

Career information
- Playing career: 2004–2019
- Position: Small forward / shooting guard
- Number: 9

Career history
- 2004–2005: Den Helder Seals
- 2006–2009: Rotterdam
- 2009–2011: West-Brabant Giants
- 2011–2013: Donar
- 2013–2014: Den Helder Kings
- 2014–2019: Rotterdam / Feyenoord

Ties Theeuwkens (born 15 January 1985) is a Dutch retired basketball player. He was a member of the Dutch national basketball team, where he played a total of 55 games for his country.

== Honours ==
- DBL three-point field goal percentage leader: 2012–13
