= Reggie Keely =

American basketball player (born 1991)

Personal information
- Born: June 9, 1991 (age 35) University Heights, Ohio, U.S.
- Listed height: 6 ft 9 in (2.06 m)
- Listed weight: 240 lb (109 kg)

Career information
- High school: Cleveland Heights (Cleveland Heights, Ohio)
- College: Ohio (2009–2013)
- NBA draft: 2013: undrafted
- Playing career: 2013–2022
- Position: Power forward

Career history
- 2013–2014: Den Helder Kings
- 2014–2015: Apollo Amsterdam
- 2015: MZT Skopje
- 2015: Strumica
- 2015–2016: Slávia TU Košice
- 2016–2017: Levickí Patrioti
- 2017: Politehnica Iași
- 2017–2018: Faros Larissas
- 2018–2019: BC Brno
- 2019–2020: Kobrat
- 2020–2021: Helios Suns
- 2021–2022: Þór Akureyri

Career highlights
- Third-team All-MAC (2013)

Reggie Keely (born June 9, 1991) is an American professional basketball player who plays for Þór Akureyri of the Úrvalsdeild karla. He played collegiately for the Ohio Bobcats.

== College career ==
Keely played four seasons for Ohio University, the team he committed to in 2008. In his time with the Bobcats, he scored a total 1,131 points for the team. This made him the fifth all-time scorer for Ohio. Keely is also the seventh all-time blocker for the Bobcats with a total of 107 blocks.

College recruiting
Name	Hometown	School	Height	Weight	Commit date
Reggie Keely; PF	University Heights, OH	Cleveland Heights HS	6 ft 8 in (2.03 m)	263 lb (119 kg)	Sep 22, 2008
Reggie Keely; PF	Recruit ratings: Scout: (85)				
Overall recruit ranking:
Note: In many cases, Scout, Rivals, 247Sports, On3, and ESPN may conflict in their listings of height and weight.; In these cases, the average was taken. ESPN grades are on a 100-point scale.; Sources:

=== Honours ===
- MAC All-Tournament Team (2013)
- All-MAC Third Team (2013)

=== Statistics ===
Season	Team	Min	FGM-FGA	FG%	3PM-3PA	3P%	FTM-FTA	FT%	Reb	Ast	Blk	Stl	PF	TO	PTS
2009–10	Ohio	16.3	2.2–4.5	.497	0.0–0.0	.000	0.9–2.3	.405	4.3	0.5	0.7	0.3	2.3	1.1	5.4
2010–11	Ohio	18.3	2.1–4.5	.453	0.0–0.0	.000	1.2–1.7	.707	4.6	0.7	1.1	0.5	2.5	1.4	5.3
2011–12	Ohio	21.4	3.5–6.8	.510	0.0–0.0	.000	2.1–3.1	.690	4.9	0.5	0.4	0.6	2.7	1.9	9.0
2012–13	Ohio	23.2	4.8–7.9	.600	0.0–0.1	.200	2.6–3.8	.674	4.5	0.7	0.8	0.8	2.4	1.2	12.1

== Professional career ==
Keely's professional career started in 2013, when he signed with the Den Helder Kings in the Netherlands. After 10 games Keely was waived by the Kings.

For the 2014–15 season he signed with BC Apollo Amsterdam. After 2 games he signed with the Hungarian team Sopron KC. After a short try-out he returned to Apollo.

On February 18, 2015, he signed with MZT Skopje of the Macedonian First League.

On December 28, 2017, Keely joined Faros Larissas of the Greek Basket League.

On August 24, 2018, Keely signed a one-year deal with Czech club BC Brno.

In November 2021, Keely signed with Þór Akureyri of the Úrvalsdeild karla.
