= Niels Vorenhout =

Dutch basketball player and coach

Personal information
- Born: March 17, 1980 (age 46) Leek, Netherlands
- Listed height: 6 ft 8 in (2.03 m)

Career information
- Playing career: 1996–2013
- Position: Small forward
- Number: 9, 10
- Coaching career: 2013–2015

Career history

Playing
- 1996–1998: RZG Donar
- 1998–2000: Omniworld Almere
- 2000–2002: MPC Donar
- 2003–2006: Den Helder Seals
- 2006: Licher Basket Baeren
- 2006–2013: BSW

Coaching
- 2013–2015: BSW

Niels Vorenhout (born March 17, 1980) is a former Dutch basketball player and coach.

== Coaching career ==
In May 2013 Vorenhout became head coach of his former club, Maxxcom BSW from Weert. In 2015, his contract expired.
