= Quincy Treffers =

Dutch basketball player

Personal information
- Born: February 4, 1991 (age 35) Den Helder, Netherlands
- Listed height: 2.02 m (6 ft 8 in)

Career information
- Playing career: 2010–2016
- Position: Power forward / center
- Number: 12

Career history
- 2010–2011: West-Brabant Giants
- 2011–2012: BSW Weert
- 2012–2014: Den Helder Kings
- 2014–2016: Aris Leeuwarden

Career highlights
- DBL U23 All-Star Game MVP (2014)

Quincy Treffers (born February 4, 1991, in Den Helder, Netherlands) is a former Dutch basketball player. He played for Dutch Basketball League clubs Bergen op Zoom, Den Helder, Weert and Aris Leeuwarden.

== Honours ==
Individual

- U23 All-Star Game MVP (1): 2014
