= Yannick van der Ark =

Dutch basketball player

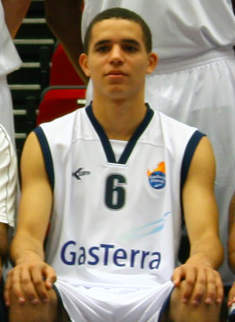
- Van der Ark in 2011

Personal information
- Born: April 12, 1993 (age 33) Groningen
- Listed height: 1.92 m (6 ft 4 in)

Career information
- Playing career: 2010–2014
- Position: Shooting guard
- Number: 6

Career history
- 2010–2014: GasTerra Flames

Career highlights
- Dutch Champion (2014); 2x Dutch Cup (2011, 2014)

Yannick van der Ark (born April 12, 1993) is a former professional basketball player. He played four seasons with the GasTerra Flames from Groningen. He won a Dutch Championship and two Cups with the team.
