= Nathan Healy =

American basketball player (born 1990)

Personal information
- Born: August 13, 1990 (age 36) New Bern, North Carolina, U.S.
- Listed height: 6 ft 7 in (2.01 m)
- Listed weight: 220 lb (100 kg)

Career information
- High school: New Bern (New Bern, North Carolina); Blair Academy (Blairstown, New Jersey)
- College: Appalachian State (2009–2013)
- NBA draft: 2013: undrafted
- Playing career: 2013–2015
- Position: Small forward / power forward
- Number: 9

Career history
- 2013: Starogard Gdański
- 2013–2014: Aris Leeuwarden
- 2014–2015: ZTE
- 2015: Brussels
- 2015: Kataja

Nathan Healy (born August 13, 1990) is an American former professional basketball player. Healy played 4 seasons for the Appalachian State Mountaineers.

== Professional career ==
Healy signed for the 2013–14 season with Polpharma Starogard Gdański. He left Poland early, in November. Healy recorded 2.3 points and 2.3 rebounds per game in 3 games for Starogard Gdański.

In November 2013, Healy signed with Aris Leeuwarden from Leeuwarden, Netherlands. Former foreign players Kinu Rochford and Greg Washington were released by Aris, so Healy was signed.

For the 2014–15 season Healy signed a one-year deal with Zalakeramia-ZTE KK in Hungary.

In April 2015, Healy signed with Basic-Fit Brussels.
