= Don Rigters =

Dutch basketball player

Personal information
- Born: 6 March 1992 (age 34) The Hague, Netherlands
- Listed height: 1.93 m (6 ft 4 in)
- Listed weight: 205 lb (93 kg)

Career information
- College: Pensascola JC (2011–2012)
- Playing career: 2012–2016
- Position: Point guard / shooting guard
- Number: 6

Career history
- 2012–2014: Rotterdam
- 2014: Den Helder Kings
- 2015–2016: Rotterdam

Don Rigters (born 6 March 1992) is a Dutch retired basketball player.

In his first two professional seasons, Rigters played for Challenge Sports Rotterdam. For 2014–15 he signed with Port of Den Helder Kings. In December 2014 Kings went bankrupt and the team was dissolved.

== In popular culture ==
In 2016 Rigters appeared in the music video "What Is Love 2016" by Belgian DJ Lost Frequencies In the video directed by Soulvizion, he plays the role of David, a basketball player who is severely injured and is trying to make a comeback to the game.
