= Robert Krabbendam =

Dutch basketball player

Free Agent
- Position: Center

Personal information
- Born: June 11, 1986 (age 40) Hoorn, Netherlands
- Listed height: 2.12 m (6 ft 11 in)
- Listed weight: 112 kg (247 lb)

Career information
- College: Virginia Tech (2004–2007)
- NBA draft: 2007: undrafted
- Playing career: 2003–present

Career history
- 2003–2004: ABC Amsterdam
- 2007–2010: ABC Amsterdam
- 2010–2011: BC Kalev
- 2011: ABC Amsterdam
- 2011–2013: Apollon Limassol
- 2013–2014: Apollo Amsterdam
- 2014–2019: Rotterdam / Feyenoord

Career highlights
- 2x Dutch League champion (2008–2009); Dutch Cup champion (2004); Estonian League champion (2011)

Robert Krabbendam (born 11 July 1986) is a Dutch basketball player who last played for Feyenoord Basketball of the Dutch Basketball League (DBL). Standing at 2.12 m (6 ft 11 1/2 in), he plays as center.

== Career ==
In the 2003-2004 season, Krabbedam played for the back then named Demon Astronauts from Amsterdam in the Dutch Basketball League. After that year he played college basketball for three seasons for the Virginia Tech Hokies men's basketball team. In 2007, he returned to the Netherlands, where he signed with Amsterdam again. In 2008 and 2009, he won the Dutch championship with the team. In 2010, Krabbendam left the Netherlands to play in Estonia for BC Kalev/Cramo. He won the Estonian championship that season. In 2011, he played for ABC Amsterdam in just one game, because he left the team early in the season for Apollon Limassol BC in Cyprus. In 2013, he signed with BC Apollo, also from Amsterdam and playing in the DBL. In the middle of the season, Krabbendam left Apollo for Rotterdam Basketbal College. He signed till the end of the 2014–15 season with the club from Rotterdam.

On 17 August 2018, Feyenoord Basketbal announced it re-signed Krabbendam for the 2018–19 season.

== National team ==
Krabbendam played for the Dutch national basketball team from 2008 till 2010.

== Honours ==
- Dutch Basketball League (2): 2007–08, 2008–09
- NBB Cup (1): 2003–04
- Korvpalli Meistriliiga (1): 2010–11
