= Bas Veenstra =

Dutch basketball player

Personal information
- Born: 7 June 1995 (age 31) Zwolle, Netherlands
- Listed height: 6 ft 8 in (2.03 m)

Career information
- Playing career: 2011–present
- Position: Power forward

Career history
- 2011–2013: Landstede Zwolle
- 2014–2017: Donar
- 2017–2018: Zamora
- 2018–2019: Aris Leeuwarden

Bas Veenstra (born 7 June 1995) is a Dutch professional basketball player. Veenstra usually plays as power forward and occasionally as center or small forward.

== Professional career ==
Veenstra started his professional career with his hometown team Landstede Basketbal.

He missed the 2013–14 season, because of a knee injury.

In July 2014, Veenstra signed a 1-year deal with Donar Groningen. In June 2015, he extended his contract with 2 years.

In July 2018, Veenstra signed a one-year contract with Aris Leeuwarden.

== Honours ==
Donar

- Dutch Basketball League (2): 2015–16, 2016-17
- NBB Cup (2): 2014–15, 2016–17
- Dutch Basketball Supercup (2): 2015, 2016
