= Jeff Robinson (basketball) =

American basketball player

Personal information
- Born: July 8, 1988 (age 38) Trenton, New Jersey, U.S.
- Listed height: 6 ft 7 in (2.01 m)
- Listed weight: 250 lb (113 kg)

Career information
- High school: St. Patrick (Elizabeth, New Jersey)
- College: Memphis (2007–2009); Seton Hall (2009–2011)
- NBA draft: 2011: undrafted
- Playing career: 2011–2017
- Position: Power forward / small forward

Career history
- 2011–2012: Panthers Fürstenfeld
- 2012–2013: AZS Koszalin
- 2013: Huracanes del Atlántico
- 2013: GasTerra Flames
- 2014: AZS Koszalin
- 2014–2015: Ironi Ramat Gan
- 2015–2016: Dzūkija Alytus
- 2017: GUG

Jeff Robinson (born July 8, 1988) is an American former professional basketball player. Robinson is 6 ft 6 in tall and usually plays the power forward or small forward position.

== Career ==
After recording 12.1 points and 6.4 rebounds per game in his senior year with the Seton Hall Pirates, Robinson started his professional career with Fürstenfeld in Austria. Robinson averaged 15.5 points and 6.9 rebounds in the Österreichische Basketball Bundesliga.

In the 2012–13 season, Robinson played in Poland for AZS Koszalin. In the summer of 2013, Robinson played in the Dominican Republic for Huracanes del Atlantico. In October 2013, Robinson signed a three month-contract with the GasTerra Flames in the Netherlands. Despite Robinson saying he wanted to stay and the club's intentions to keep him, both couldn't reach an agreement.

On January 30, 2014, it was announced that Robinson returned to his old Polish club AZS Koszalin.

== The Basketball Tournament ==
Jeff Robinson played for Hall In in the 2018 edition of The Basketball Tournament. In 2 games, he averaged 13.5 points, 4.5 rebounds, and 1.5 steals per game. Hall In reached the second round before falling to the Golden Eagles.
