= Kenrick Zondervan =

Dutch basketball player

Personal information
- Born: 28 November 1985 (age 40) Heemstede, Netherlands
- Listed height: 2.06 m (6 ft 9 in)

Career information
- College: UCF (2005–2009)
- NBA draft: 2009: undrafted
- Playing career: 2009–2016
- Position: Center
- Number: 13

Career history
- 2009: Egaleo
- 2010: AMSB
- 2011–2016: Landstede Zwolle

Kenrick Zondervan (born 28 November 1985) is a Dutch retired basketball player. Standing at 2.06 m (6 ft 9 in), he mainly played as center.

== Career ==
Zondervan played college basketball in the NCAA for the UCF Knights. After that, he played in Greece for Egaleo and for AMSB in France. Zondervan spent five years in the Dutch Basketball League playing for Landstede Basketbal. In September 2016, Zondervan was forced to retire after a shoulder injury.
