= Thijs Vermeulen =

Dutch basketball player

Personal information
- Born: March 11, 1985 (age 41) Rosmalen, Netherlands
- Listed height: 1.94 m (6 ft 4 in)

Career information
- Playing career: 2004–2014
- Position: Shooting guard
- Number: 8

Career history
- 2004–2007: EiffelTowers Den Bosch
- 2007–2014: Matrixx Magixx

Career highlights
- 2× DBL champion (2006, 2007)

Thijs Vermeulen (born March 11, 1985) is a Dutch former basketball player. He was a long-time member of the DBL team Matrixx Magixx, which led to fans giving him the nickname "Mr. Magixx". Vermeulen played as shooting guard and was well known for his three point shooting qualities. After Magixx went bankrupt and left competition in 2014, he retired.

Vermeulen played in three games for the Netherlands men's national basketball team after making his debut on 5 September 2007 against Albania.

== Honours ==
EiffelTowers Den Bosch

- Dutch Basketball League (2): 2006, 2007
