= Tony Johnson (basketball) =

American basketball player (born 1991)

Personal information
- Born: September 21, 1991 (age 34) Folsom, California, U.S.
- Listed height: 6 ft 0 in (1.83 m)
- Listed weight: 177 lb (80 kg)

Career information
- High school: Folsom (Folsom, California)
- College: Lafayette (2009–2013)
- NBA draft: 2013: undrafted
- Playing career: 2013–2016
- Position: Point guard
- Number: 3, 11

Career history
- 2013–2014: SPM Shoeters Den Bosch
- 2014–2016: Fuerza Regia de Monterrey

Career highlights
- Second-team All-Patriot League (2012); First-team All-Patriot League (2013); Patriot League All-Tournament Team (2013)

Anthony Johnson (born September 21, 1991) is an American former professional basketball player. He played college basketball at Lafayette, and went undrafted in the 2013 NBA draft. He played for SPM Shoeters Den Bosch and Fuerza Regia de Monterrey.

== Early life and high school ==
Johnson grew up in Folsom, California and attended Folsom High School. In a game against Monte Vista High School on March 13, 2009, Johnson scored 9 points and shot 3 for 3 from the field in the 63–42 loss, the team's first loss in 29 games. Johnson was named to The Sacramento Bee's All-Metro first-team, and an honorable mention for the MaxPreps Boys' Basketball All-State Team after averaging 17.3 points per game during the 2008–09 season.

== College career ==
During Johnson's junior season, he broke his foot, causing him to miss the rest of that season and the beginning of his senior year. lost to bucknell in 2013 tournament 11 points back injury combined 42 points with Seth Hinrichs beat lehigh 82–69 win against colgate 82–76 10 points 7 assists second team all patriot league

== Professional career ==
=== Heroes Den Bosch ===
On August 6, 2013, Johnson signed with Dutch Basketball League's Heroes Den Bosch.

=== Fuerza Regia de Monterrey ===
On August 29, 2014, Johnson signed with Mexican club Fuerza Regia de Monterrey.
