= Jeremy Ormskerk =

Dutch basketball player

Personal information
- Born: 17 December 1982 (age 43) Amsterdam, Netherlands
- Listed height: 1.88 m (6 ft 2 in)

Career information
- Playing career: 2002–2016
- Position: Shooting guard / point guard

Career history
- 2002–2006: Amsterdam Astronauts
- 2006–2007: ZZ Leiden
- 2007–2008: Omniworld Almere
- 2008–2009: BS Weert
- 2009–2011: Rotterdam Basketbal College
- 2012–2013: Apollo Amsterdam
- 2013–2016: BS Weert

Jeremy Ormskerk (born 17 December 1982 in Amsterdam) is a retired Dutch basketball player. Ormskerk played for the Dutch Basketball League teams BS Weert, Amsterdam Astronauts, ZZ Leiden, BC Apollo, Omniworld Almere and Rotterdam Basketbal College during his career. As well, Ormskerk played in 31 games for the Dutch national basketball team.

== Honours ==
Amsterdam Astronauts

- Dutch Basketball League (1): 2004–05
- NBB Cup (2): 2003–04, 2005–06
