= Mark-Peter Hof =

Dutch basketball player (born 1990)

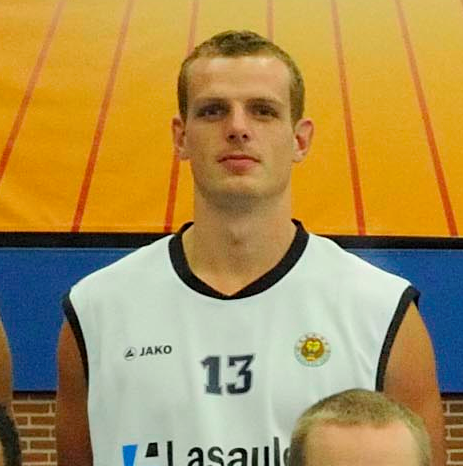
- Hof with Aris Leeuwarden in 2011

Personal information
- Born: January 2, 1990 (age 36) Groningen, Netherlands
- Listed height: 6 ft 6 in (1.98 m)

Career information
- NBA draft: 2008: undrafted
- Playing career: 2008–2014
- Position: Small forward / power forward

Career history
- 2008–2011: GasTerra Flames
- 2011–2012: Aris Leeuwarden
- 2013–2014: GasTerra Flames

Career highlights
- Dutch League champion (2010); Dutch Cup champion (2011)

Mark-Peter Hof (born 2 January 1990) is a Dutch former professional basketball player. Hof usually played at the small forward or power forward position.

== Career ==
In 2008, Hof started playing as a professional player with the back then named Hanzevast Capitals, a team from the Dutch Basketball League in his hometown Groningen. Hof played three seasons in a row with the club. In 2010, he won the national championship with the team that was renamed the GasTerra Flames. In his last season, the 2010–2011 season, he also won the NBB Cup with the team. Hof left Groningen in 2011, when he decided to go play for Aris Leeuwarden in the same league. After playing as an amateur player in the 2012–2013 season for the Groene Uilen in the Promotiedivisie, Hof returned to his former team GasTerra Flames by signing a one-year contract.
