= Max van Schaik =

Dutch basketball player

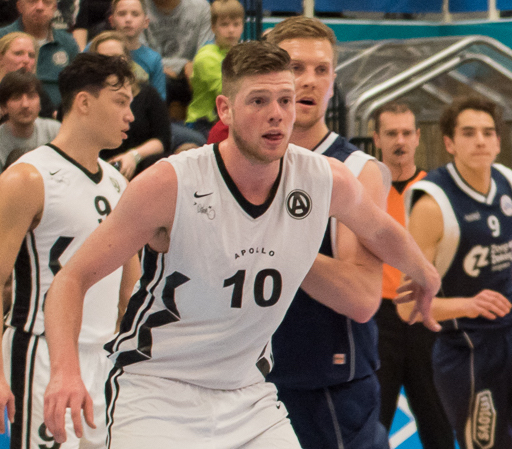
- Van Schaik in 2016

No. 10 – Apollo Amsterdam
- Position: Power forward

Personal information
- Born: 28 June 1991 (age 35) Amsterdam, Netherlands
- Listed height: 2.07 m (6 ft 9 in)

Career information
- Playing career: 2009–present

Career history
- 2009–2010: Prat
- 2010–2011: Guadalajara
- 2011–2012: GasTerra Flames
- 2012–2014: Den Helder Kings
- 2014–2018: Apollo Amsterdam
- 2018: New Heroes Den Bosch
- 2019–present: Apollo Amsterdam

Career highlights
- DBL All-Star (2016)

Max van Schaik (born 28 June 1991) is a Dutch basketball player. Van Schaik is 2.07 m (6 ft 9 in) tall and usually plays as power forward.

== Early career ==
Van Schaik played for the youth department of Joventut Badalona in the 2008–09 season.

== Professional career ==
Van Schaik started his career in Spain in the LEB Plata, playing two seasons for respectively CB Prat and CB Guadalajara. In 2011, Van Schaik signed with GasTerra Flames of the Dutch Basketball League (DBL). After one season for the Flames, he left for Den Helder Kings. In 2014, Van Schaik transferred to Apollo Amsterdam where he went on to become one of the team's most important players. In the 2015–16 season, he made his first DBL All-Star Game appearance.

On October 19, 2018, Van Schaik signed a one-month contract with New Heroes Den Bosch. He played three games with New Heroes.

On January 19, 2019, it was announced Van Schaik returned to Apollo Amsterdam.

== International career ==
Van Schaik played for the U18 and U20 Netherlands national team.
