= Kasper Averink =

Dutch basketball player (born 1993)

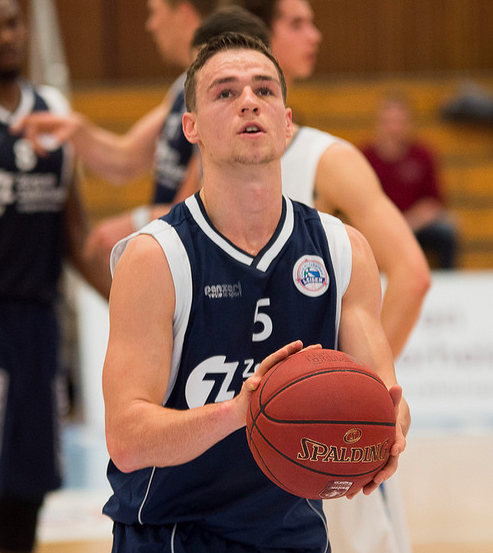
- Averink with ZZ Leiden in 2016

Free agent
- Position: Shooting guard / point guard

Personal information
- Born: 11 June 1993 (age 33) Leiden, Netherlands
- Listed height: 6 ft 0 in (1.83 m)
- Listed weight: 190 lb (86 kg)

Career information
- Playing career: 2011–present

Career history
- 2011–2012: Prievidza
- 2012–2016: ZZ Leiden
- 2016–2017: BSW Weert
- 2017–2018: Rotterdam

Career highlights
- Slovak League champion (2012); Dutch League champion (2013); Dutch Supercup champion (2013)

Kasper Averink (born 11 June 1993) is a six-foot tall Dutch basketball player in the point guard or shooting guard position.
