= Thomas Koenis =

Dutch basketball player

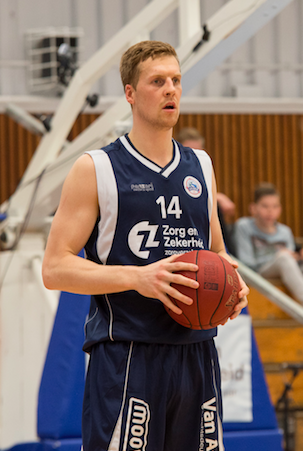
- Koenis with Leiden in 2016

Den Helder Suns
- Title: Technical manager
- League: BNXT League

Personal information
- Born: 11 December 1989 (age 36) Hoogkarspel, Netherlands
- Listed height: 2.10 m (6 ft 11 in)
- Listed weight: 227 lb (103 kg)

Career information
- Playing career: 2007–2022
- Position: Center
- Number: 14

Career history
- 2007–2009: Den Helder Seals
- 2009–2011: West-Brabant Giants
- 2011–2015: GasTerra Flames / Donar
- 2015–2017: ZZ Leiden
- 2017–2022: Donar

Career highlights
- 2× DBL champion (2014, 2018); 4× Dutch Cup winner (2014, 2015, 2018, 2022); 2× Dutch Supercup winner (2014, 2018); All-DBL First Team (2018); 2× DBL All-Defense Team (2017, 2018); 2× DBL MVP Under 23 (2009, 2012); No. 14 retired by Donar

Thomas Petrus A. Koenis (born 11 December 1989) is a Dutch retired basketball player. Standing at 2.10 m (6 ft 11 in), he played at the center position.

He started his career with the Den Helder Seals in 2007, before signing with West-Brabant Giants in 2009. After two seasons for the Giants, Koenis signed with Donar. In 2015, he signed with ZZ Leiden where he stayed for two seasons before returning to Donar. Koenis played 15 season of professional basketball, with nine of them being with Donar. After his career, Koenis' number 14 was retired by the club to honour him.

In international play, Koenis represented the Netherlands men's national basketball team in 41 games.

== Early life ==
Koenis was born in Hoogkarspel and first played football as a keeper and was also interested in judo. He started playing basketball at age 13 with BV Enkhuizen.

== Professional career ==
Koenis started his professional career with the Den Helder Seals in 2007. After two seasons Koenis left Den Helder for WCAA Giants from Bergen op Zoom, because the club from Den Helder was bankrupt. When the Giants also decided to leave the Dutch Basketball League in 2011, Koenis signed a 3-year contract with the GasTerra Flames from Groningen.

In the 2015 offseason, Koenis signed a 2-year deal with ZZ Leiden.

On 9 June 2017, returned to Donar by signing a 3-year contract. On 10 January 2018, Koenis scored 25 points while shooting 9/9 from the field, accumulating an efficiency rating of 36 in a 109–69 win against Keravnos in the FIBA Europe Cup. This earned him the Top Performer honour for Round 2 of the FIBA Europe Cup second round. In the 2017–18 season, Koenis was named to the All-DBL Team for the first time.

On 25 June 2022, Koenis announced his retirement from professional basketball at age 32. On 6 December 2022, Donar retired Koenis' jersey number 14, while also naming a stand in the MartiniPlaza after him.

== Post-playing career ==
Koenis was hired as the technical manager of the Den Helder Suns in June 2023.

== Awards and accomplishments ==
=== Club ===
Donar

- 2× Dutch Basketball League: 2013–14, 2017–18
- 4× NBB Cup: 2013–14, 2014–15, 2017–18, 2021–22
- Dutch Supercup (2): 2014, 2018

=== Individual ===
- 2× MVP Under 23: 2008–09, 2011–12
- 3× DBL All-Star: 2015, 2016, 2017
- 2× DBL All-Defense Team: 2016–17, 2017–18
