= Benny van der Reijden =

Dutch basketball player

No. 1 – BV Groningen
- Position: Center
- League: Tweede divisie

Personal information
- Born: July 1, 1994 (age 32) Zoetermeer, Netherlands
- Listed height: 2.09 m (6 ft 10 in)
- Listed weight: 209 lb (95 kg)

Career information
- High school: Noorderpoort
- College: Hanzehogeschool Groningen
- Playing career: 2012–present

Career history
- 2012–2015: GasTerra Flames / Donar Groningen
- 2016–Present: BV Groningen

Career highlights
- Dutch League champion (2014); 2x Dutch Cup champion (2014–2015)

Benny van der Reijden (born July 1, 1994) is a former professional basketball player, who played three seasons for Donar as a development player. Van der Reijden was part of the 2014 DBL championship team and won 2 NBB Cups with Donar.
