= Arvin Slagter =

Dutch basketball player (born 1985)

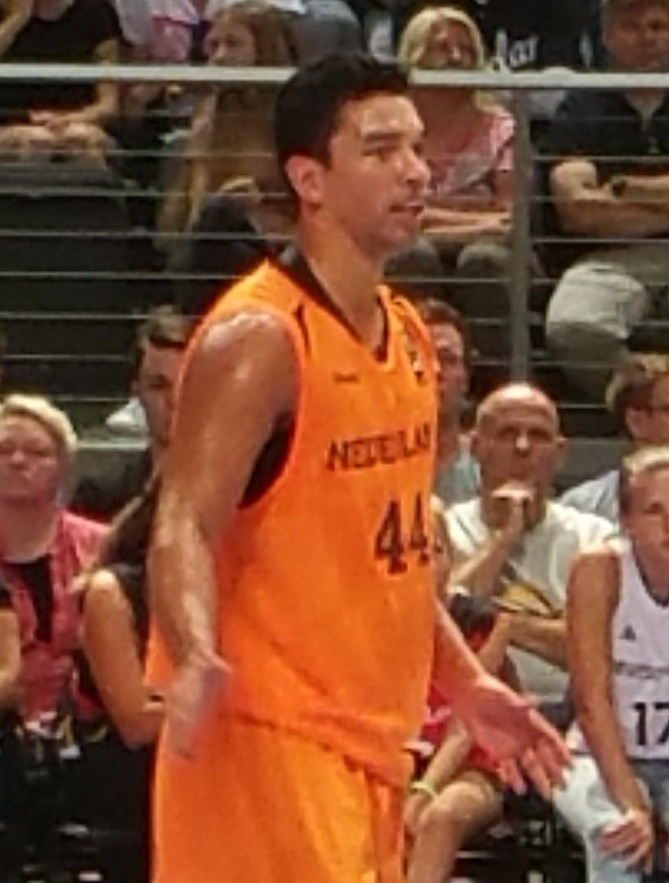
- Slagter in 2016

Personal information
- Born: 19 October 1985 (age 41) Amsterdam, Netherlands
- Listed height: 6 ft 3 in (1.91 m)

Career information
- Playing career: 2003–2019
- Position: Point guard / shooting guard

Career history
- 2003–2007: Rotterdam
- 2007–2010: West-Brabant Giants
- 2010–2013: ZZ Leiden
- 2013–2014: Donar
- 2014–2016: Den Bosch
- 2016–2019: Donar

Career highlights
- 6× DBL champion (2011, 2013–2015, 2017, 2018); 5× Dutch Cup champion (2012, 2014, 2016–2018); 4× Dutch Supercups champion (2011, 2012, 2015, 2016); DBL Most Valuable Player (2014); DBL Play-offs MVP (2014); 2× DBL Sixth Man of the Year (2017, 2018); All-DBL Team (2014); DBL All-Defense Team (2014); 2× DBL MVP Under 23 (2006, 2008); 2× Kees Akerboom Trophy (2013, 2014); 8× DBL All-Star (2007, 2010, 2013, 2014, 2016, 2017)
Medals
Men's 3x3 basketball
Representing the Netherlands
Olympic Games
Gold medal – first place	2024 Paris	Team
Europe Cup
Bronze medal – third place	2018 Bucharest
Bronze medal – third place	2022 Graz

Arvin Slagter (born 19 September 1985) is a Dutch basketball player who plays for the Netherlands men's national 3x3 team. Slagter became an Olympic champion in Paris 2024 with the Netherlands.

Slagter also played for several other Dutch 5vs5 teams in his career, including Rotterdam, Bergen op Zoom, Leiden and Groningen. Slagter usually plays the point guard or shooting guard position and is also a member of the 5vs5 Dutch national basketball team since 2006. He is currently a member of the 3X3 Dutch National Team. Slagter is the all-time leader in assists (1,614) in the Dutch Basketball League.

== Career ==
=== Rotterdam (2003–2007) ===
Slagter played his first seasons for Rotterdam Basketbal. In 2006 he was named the MVP under 23.

=== West-Brabant Giants (2007–2010) ===
Slagter left Rotterdam in 2007 for WCAA Giants in Bergen op Zoom. In 2010 he reached the DBL Finals with the Giants.

=== ZZ Leiden (2010–2013) ===
After the 2009–10 season Slagter went to Leiden to play for Zorg en Zekerheid Leiden. In three seasons with Leiden he won the DBL twice, the Dutch Supercup twice and the NBB Cup once.

=== GasTerra Flames (2013–2014) ===
Slagter left the defending champion Leiden and signed with GasTerra Flames (formerly Donar) from Groningen for the 2013–14 season. He won the NBB Cup with the Flames and got the top seed in the DBL. Slagter averaged 8.8 points and 4.4 assists in 24.6 minutes per game in the DBL regular season. He also was the league leader in three point percentage, as he was shooting .500 from behind the arc. On 21 April 2014 Slagter was named the best player in the Netherlands, by receiving the DBL Most Valuable Player Award. Slagter was the first Dutch MVP since Peter van Paassen in 2009.

After the Playoffs, in which Flames beat Amsterdam, Leiden and Den Bosch Slagter was named Playoffs MVP. He averaged 8.9 points, 3.1 rebounds and 2.8 assists in 14 playoff games.

=== Den Bosch (2014–2016) ===
On 8 July 2014, Slagter signed a 2-year contract with SPM Shoeters Den Bosch.

=== Donar (2016–2019) ===
On 8 July 2016, Slagter signed a 1-year contract with Donar, which he previously played for in the 2013–14 season, when the team was named "GasTerra Flames". In the 2016–17 season, Slagter was named DBL Sixth Man of the Year. In April 2017, Slagter extended his contract with 2 more years.

In the 2017–18 season, Slagter won his second Sixth Man of the Year Award.

== 3x3 basketball ==
In 2020, Slagter started playing 3x3 basketball with the 3X3 Team Amsterdam and the Netherlands national 3x3 team. He helped the team qualify and played at the 2020 Summer Olympics in Tokyo, where the team finished in the fifth place. At the 2024 Summer Olympics in Paris, he won a gold medal with the team.

== International career ==
On 24 August 2006, Slagter made his debut for the Netherlands national basketball team in a game against Iceland. He played at EuroBasket 2015, and averaged 4.4 points and 2.6 assists per game.

Slagter played in 132 games for the Netherlands and scored a total of 973 points, good for an average of 7.4 points per game.

== Honors ==
=== Club ===
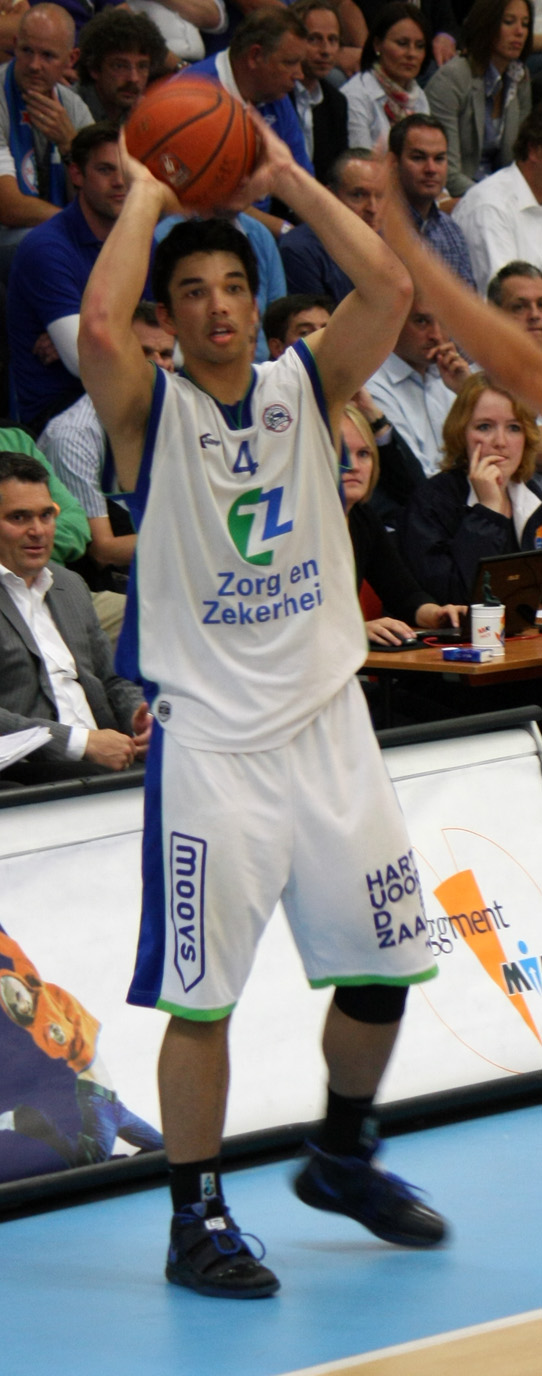
Slagter playing for ZZ Leiden in 2011

- Dutch Basketball League (5):

2010–11, 2012–13, 2013–14, 2014–15, 2016–17

- Dutch Cup (5):

2011–12, 2013–14, 2015–16, 2016–17, 2017–18

- Dutch Supercups (4):

2011, 2012, 2015, 2016

=== Individual awards ===
- DBL Most Valuable Player: 2014
- DBL Playoffs MVP: 2014
- DBL All-Star Team: 2014
- DBL MVP Under 23: 2006, 2008
- DBL All-Star: 2007, 2010, 2013, 2014
- DBL All-Defense Team: 2014

== Player profile ==
Slagter is known as a three-point specialist with a high basketball IQ and excellent court vision. He is also praised for his leadership capability in the Netherlands, as he was part of championship teams with different clubs in the DBL.

== Personal life ==
Slagter is the son of a Dutch father and a Surinamese mother. His younger brother, Gian, also played professional basketball for Apollo Amsterdam and Rotterdam. His sister, Zoë, plays professionally for the Den Helder Suns.
