= Quentin Pryor =

American basketball player

Personal information
- Born: September 26, 1983 (age 43) Eupora, Mississippi
- Listed height: 6 ft 4 in (1.93 m)
- Listed weight: 195 lb (88 kg)

Career information
- High school: Eupora (Eupora, Mississippi)
- College: Holmes CC (2003–2004); Jackson State CC (2004–2005); Morehead State (2005–2007)
- NBA draft: 2007: undrafted
- Playing career: 2007–2014
- Position: Shooting guard / point guard
- Number: 4

Career history
- 2007–2008: Schalke 04
- 2008–2011: Phoenix Hagen
- 2011–2012: Raiffeisen Wels
- 2012–2013: Kapfenberg Bulls
- 2013–2014: GasTerra Flames
- 2014: AEK Larnaca

Career highlights
- Dutch League champion (2014); Dutch Cup champion (2014); BBL All-Defensive Team (2011); ABL All-Star (2012); All-ABL Second Team (2012)

Quentin Vinlay Pryor (born September 26, 1983) is an American former basketball player. Standing at 6 ft 4 in (1.93 m), Pryor mainly played at the shooting guard and point guard position.

== Career ==
Pryor signed with GasTerra Flames from Groningen, Netherlands in August 2013. Pryor was second in Sixth Man of the Year voting and won both trophies in the Netherlands. In May Flames took the Dutch Cup and on June 1 the national championship.

For the 2014–15 season Pryor signed with AEK Larnaca B.C.

== Coaching career ==
Pryor became the boys head basketball coach of Louisville Central High School in Louisville, KY in August 2024. The team finished 8-21 but still reached the district championship game and regional tournament.
