= Akeel Eduardo =

Dutch professional basketball player

Free agent
- Position: Shooting guard / small forward

Personal information
- Born: 10 January 1993 (age 33) Sint Maarten
- Listed height: 193 cm (6 ft 4 in)

Career information
- High school: Plein College Sint Joris
- College: Johan Cruijff Universiteit
- NBA draft: 2015: undrafted
- Playing career: 2011–present

Career history
- 2011–2017: BSW
- 2017–2018: Apollo Amsterdam

Akeel Eduardo (born 10 January 1993) is a Dutch professional basketball player, who last played for Apollo Amsterdam of the Dutch Basketball League (DBL). Born on Sint Maarten, Eduardo usually plays at the shooting guard or small forward position.
