= Craig Osaikhwuwuomwan =

Dutch professional basketball player (born 1990)

Flyers Wels
- Position: Center

Personal information
- Born: 12 October 1990 (age 36) Budel, Netherlands
- Listed height: 6 ft 11 in (2.11 m)

Career information
- Playing career: 2010–present

Career history
- 2010–2011: ABC Amsterdam
- 2011–2012: Matrixx Magixx
- 2012–2013: Aris Leeuwarden
- 2013–2015: Donar
- 2015–2016: Landstede Zwolle
- 2016–2017: Aris Leeuwarden
- 2017–2018: Rustavi
- 2018: VfL SparkassenStars Bochum
- 2018–2021: Aris Leeuwarden
- 2021: Tallinna Kalev
- 2021–2022: Děčín
- 2023–2024: Rilski
- 2024: Vëllaznimi
- 2024–present: Flyers Wels

Career highlights
- Dutch League champion (2014); 2x Dutch Cup champion (2014–2015); Dutch Supercup champion (2014); DBL Rookie of the Year (2011)

Craig Osaikhwuwuomwan (born 12 October 1990) is a Dutch professional basketball player who plays for Flyers Wels. He is a 2.11 m (6 ft 11 in) tall and usually plays the center position. Osaikhwuwuomwan is a former member of the Dutch national basketball team.

== Professional career ==
On 3 August 2010, Craig signed his first professional contract with ABC Amsterdam in the DBL. He averaged 3,6 points and 3,5 rebounds per game and eventually won the DBL Rookie of the Year award.

After the club from Amsterdam went bankrupt, Osaikhwuwuomwan signed with Magixx playing for KidsRights in Wijchen.

The following year, Osaikhwuwuomwan played for Aris Leeuwarden. With Leeuwarden, he reached the DBL Finals.

On 31 May 2013 he signed with GasTerra Flames. Osaikhwuwuomwan stayed there for the 2013–14 and 2014–15 season. In 2014 he won the DBL championship, in 2014 and 2015 he won the NBB Cup.

For the 2014–15 season, he signed with Landstede Basketbal.

On 9 August 2017, Osaikhwuwuomwan signed with Plymouth Raiders of the British Basketball League. He was released on 11 September, after he did not pass the club's medical assessment.

In the 2017–18 season, he played for BC Rustavi in Georgia. There, he averaged eight points and six rebounds per game, appearing 13 Superliga games.

On 18 December 2018, he returned to Aris Leeuwarden for the remainder of the 2018–19 season. He was released on 3 March 2021.

In the 2021–22 season, Osaikhwuwuomwan played for Armex Děčín in the Czech NBL, averaging 9.8 points and 6.8 rebounds in 16 games.

== National team career ==
Osaikhwuwuomwan played 19 games for the Netherlands men's national basketball team, after making his debut on 30 July 2011 in a game against Cyprus.

== Awards and accomplishments ==
Donar

- Dutch Basketball League: 2014
- 2× NBB Cup: 2014, 2015
- Dutch Basketball Supercup: 2014

Individual

- DBL Rookie of the Year: 2011
