= Dan Coleman (basketball) =

American basketball player (born 1985)

Personal information
- Born: February 13, 1985 (age 41) Minneapolis, Minnesota, U.S.
- Listed height: 6 ft 9 in (2.06 m)
- Listed weight: 220 lb (100 kg)

Career information
- High school: Hopkins (Minnetonka, Minnesota)
- College: Minnesota (2003–2008)
- NBA draft: 2008: undrafted
- Playing career: 2008–2014
- Position: Power forward / small forward

Career history
- 2008–2009: AD Vagos
- 2009–2011: JL Bourg-en-Bresse
- 2011–2012: JA Vichy
- 2012: Sioux Falls Skyforce
- 2012–2013: Kataja
- 2013–2014: GasTerra Flames

Career highlights
- Dutch League champion (2014); Dutch Cup champion (2014); LPB Most Valuable Player (2009); All-LPB Team (2009); DBL All-Star (2014)

Daniel Coleman (born February 13, 1985) is an American former professional basketball player. In the 2013–14 season he played for the GasTerra Flames in the Netherlands.

== Professional career ==
Coleman started his career with A.D. Vagos in the Portuguese LPB. In his first year, he averaged 18.5 points and 7.8 rebounds per game and was named the league's Most Valuable Player.

The next two year he played with JL Bourg-en-Bresse in the French second tier LNB Pro B.

In the 2013–14 season Coleman played for the GasTerra Flames in the Dutch Basketball League. With Flames he won the 'double'; both the league championship and cup championship was won by the team.

== Outside basketball ==
Coleman grew up in south Minneapolis. He has since become a real estate developer and owns property near George Floyd Square.
