= Aron Royé =

Dutch basketball player (born 1988)

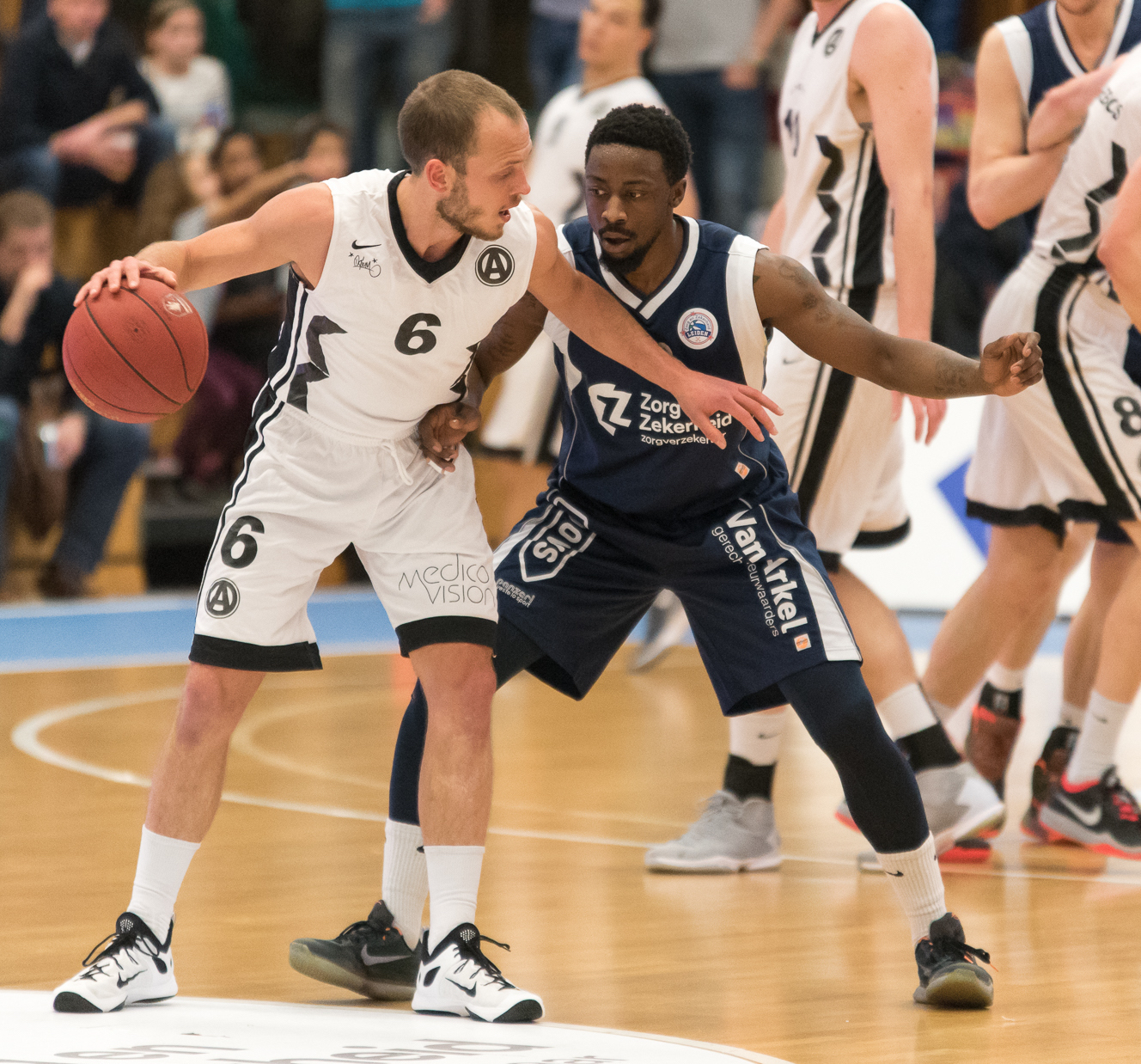
- Royé (left) guarded by Cashmere Wright in 2017

Free agent
- Position: Point guard

Personal information
- Born: 3 April 1988 (age 38) Amsterdam, Netherlands
- Listed height: 1.83 m (6 ft 0 in)

Career information
- Playing career: 2006–present

Career history
- 2006–2008: ZZ Leiden
- 2008–2011: GasTerra Flames
- 2012–2014: Apollo Amsterdam
- 2014: Den Helder Kings
- 2014–2017: Apollo Amsterdam
- 2017: Donar
- 2018–2019: Apollo Amsterdam

Career highlights
- 2x DBL All-Star (2013–2014); Dutch League champion (2010); Dutch Cup champion (2011)
Medals
Men's 3x3 basketball
Representing the Netherlands
FIBA 3x3 World Cup
Silver medal – second place	2018	National team

Aron Royé (born 3 April 1988) is a Dutch basketball player who last played for Apollo Amsterdam in the Dutch Basketball League (DBL).

== Career ==
Royé started his career in Leiden with Zorg en Zekerheid Leiden. After two seasons, Royé left for the Hanzevast Capitals from Groningen. With the club from Groningen, that later played under the name GasTerra Flames, Royé won the national championship in 2010 and the Dutch Cup in 2011. In the summer of 2011 Royé decided to play for amateur team Apollo Amsterdam in the Dutch second division. When Apollo turned professional in 2012, Royé reentered the Dutch Basketball League. In his first season with Amsterdam, Royé averaged 16.3 points per game, which made him fourth best scorer in the DBL. He also made the All-Star Team that year. In August 2013 his contract was extended.

On 11 July 2014 Royé signed a 2-year deal with Port of Den Helder Kings. In December, Kings went bankrupt and Royé transferred to his former team, Apollo Amsterdam.

On 31 May 2017 Royé signed a 2-year contract for a second stint with Donar. On 28 December Royé left Donar.

On 12 January 2018 Royé returned to Apollo Amsterdam.

== 3x3 Basketball ==
Royé played with the Dutch national 3x3 basketball team at the 2018 FIBA 3x3 World Cup, where he won a silver medal. He played his second tournament in the 2019 FIBA 3x3 World Cup.
