= Mark Ridderhof =

Dutch basketball player

Personal information
- Born: April 25, 1989 (age 37) Kampen, Overijssel
- Listed height: 6 ft 4 in (1.93 m)

Career information
- Playing career: 2009–2015
- Position: Shooting guard

Career history
- 2009–2013: Landstede Basketbal
- 2013–2014: Apollo Amsterdam
- 2014–2015: Donar

Career highlights
- Dutch Cup champion (2015); Dutch Supercup champion (2014)

Mark Ridderhof (born April 25, 1989) is a retired Dutch professional basketball player. He played professionally since 2009, when he joined Landstede Basketbal. Since then, he played for Apollo Amsterdam and Donar Groningen in the Dutch Basketball League (DBL).
