= 2013–14 NBB Cup =

NBB Cup
- Duration: 19 October 2013 – 30 March 2014
- Teams: 48

Finals
- Champions: GasTerra Flames (3rd title)
- Runners-up: ZZ Leiden
- Semifinalists: SPM Shoeters Den Bosch; Aris Leeuwarden

The 2013-14 NBB Cup was the 46th season of the NBB Cup. It was managed by the Nationale Basketball Bond (English: National Basketball Federation). SPM Shoeters Den Bosch were the defending champion having won the cup the previous season.

The championship game was played on 30 March 2014 at the Landstede Sportcentrum in Zwolle. Finalists were Zorg en Zekerheid Leiden and GasTerra Flames. GasTerra Flames won 79–71.

== Participants ==
The draw was held on 19 July 2013 in Nieuwegein. Teams in bold play in the Dutch Basketball League (DBL).

League	Clubs			
Dutch Basketball League	**Apollo**	**Aris Leeuwarden**	**Den Helder Kings**	**SPM Shoeters Den Bosch**
Dutch Basketball League	**GasTerra Flames**	**ZZ Leiden**	**Landstede Basketbal**	**Matrixx Magixx**
Dutch Basketball League	**Maxxcom BSW**	**Challenge Sports Rotterdam**		
Promotiedivisie and Eerste Divisie	BV Pluto	New Stars	De Hoppers	De Groene Uilen
Promotiedivisie and Eerste Divisie	Attacus	Cangeroes Utrecht	BV Groningen	De Wit-Grasshoppers
Promotiedivisie and Eerste Divisie	EBBC 2	Almonte Basketbal	Landstede Basketbal ZAC	BV Hoofddorp
Promotiedivisie and Eerste Divisie	Apollo 2	Almere Pioneers	VBC Akrides	The Jugglers
Promotiedivisie and Eerste Divisie	The Black Eagles	Lokomotief	BV Wyba	TSBV Pendragon
Promotiedivisie and Eerste Divisie	DBW Rowic	Punch	Landslake Lions	BC Kimbria
Promotiedivisie and Eerste Divisie	CobraNova	Red Giants	UBALL	ZZ Leiden 2
Promotiedivisie and Eerste Divisie	Wildcats	Binnenland	Virtus Werkendam	Red Stars
Promotiedivisie and Eerste Divisie	HBV The Jumpers	BC Vlissingen	Bossini GSStars	Orka's Urk
Promotiedivisie and Eerste Divisie	Arnhem Eagles	Rotterdam Basketbal 2		

Key
Winner
Eliminated in finals
Eliminated in semifinals
Eliminated in quarterfinals
Eliminated in fourth round

== Fourth round ==
Team 1	Score	Team 2
Maxxcom BSW	44–64	ZZ Leiden
BV Pluto	59–104	Matrixx Magixx
Aris Leeuwarden	78–68	Apollo
Grasshoppers	48–65	Challenge Sports Rotterdam
The Black Eagles	57–98	GasTerra Flames
Binnenland	56–65	Den Helder Kings
Landslake Lions	56–103	SPM Shoeters Den Bosch
ZZ Leiden 2	63–85	Landstede Basketbal

== Quarterfinals ==
Team 1	Agg.	Team 2	1st leg	2nd leg
Challenge Sports Rotterdam	127–158	Aris Leeuwarden	58–80	69–78
Landstede Basketbal	128–148	SPM Shoeters Den Bosch	60–79	68–69
Den Helder Kings	144–152	GasTerra Flames	85–85	59–67
Matrixx Magixx	135–137	ZZ Leiden	62–61	73–76

== Semifinals ==
Team 1	Agg.	Team 2	1st leg	2nd leg
GasTerra Flames	144–135	SPM Shoeters Den Bosch	77–66	67–69
Aris Leeuwarden	141–156	ZZ Leiden	78–78	63–78

== Final ==
30 March 2014	ZZ Leiden	71–79	GasTerra Flames	Zwolle
14:00	Scoring by quarter: 23–21, 12–26, 12–20, 24–12
RTV Noord, NOS	Pts: D. Wright 28; Rebs: Thompson 10; Asts: D. Wright, Holcomb-Faye 3	Report	Pts: C. Wright 19; Rebs: Bekkering 11; Asts: Slagter 6	Arena: Landstede Sportcentrum; Attendance: 1,200
