= Cashmere Wright =

American basketball player (born 1990)

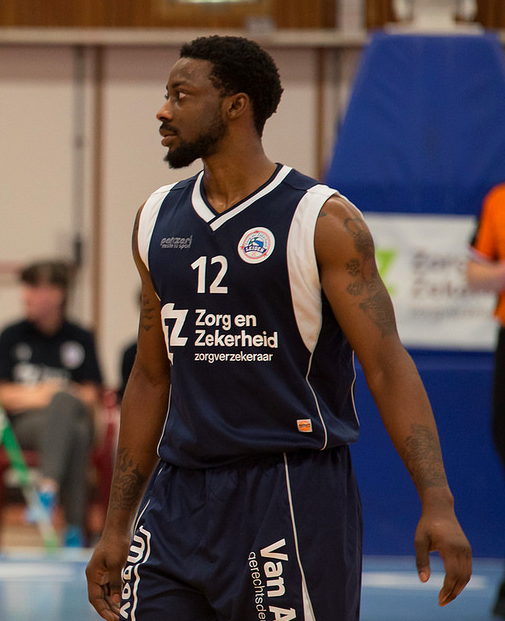
- Wright as a player for ZZ Leiden in 2016

Personal information
- Born: January 9, 1990 (age 36) Savannah, Georgia, U.S.
- Listed height: 6 ft 0 in (1.83 m)
- Listed weight: 178 lb (81 kg)

Career information
- High school: Urban Christian Academy (Savannah, Georgia)
- College: Cincinnati (2009–2013)
- NBA draft: 2013: undrafted
- Playing career: 2013–2016
- Position: Point guard
- Number: 1, 11, 12

Career history
- 2013–2014: GasTerra Flames
- 2014: AEK Athens
- 2015: Wilki Morskie Szczecin
- 2015–2016: ZZ Leiden

Career highlights
- Dutch League champion (2014); Dutch Cup champion (2014); All-DBL Team (2014); DBL All-Star (2014); All-Big East tournament Team (2012)

Cashmere A'keem Wright (born January 9, 1990) is an American former professional basketball player. He played college basketball with the Cincinnati Bearcats. Afterwards, he spent three seasons playing professionally in the Netherlands, Greece and Poland.

== College career ==
Wright was named to the 2012 All- Big East tournament team with the Cincinnati Bearcats after unranked Cincinnati knocked off #2 Syracuse in the semifinals at Madison Square Garden. The Bearcats beat 15 ranked teams with Cashmere at the point guard position over his career (2009–13). Wright wore number 1 and is the all-time leader in steals (198) for Cincinnati. Wright is also the only player in Cincinnati history to record at least 1300 points, 475 assists and 175 steals.

== Professional career ==
=== Netherlands (2013–14) ===
In July 2013 Wright signed his first pro-contract with the GasTerra Flames from Groningen, Netherlands. In March Wright won his first championship in the national NBB Cup, in the Final against Zorg en Zekerheid Leiden Wright went off for 19 points. Wright was 5th in the Dutch league in scoring, with 14.2 points per game and was 10th in assists with 3.6 per game. He got a place in the All-DBL Team after the regular season. On June 1, 2014 he won the Dutch championship as well.

=== Greece and Poland (2014–15) ===
For the 2014–15 season, Wright signed with AEK Athens of the Greek A1. Wright was released by AEK on November 7, 2014. Wright signed with the Halifax Rainmen of NBL Canada but did not play. On January 6, 2015, he signed with Wilki Morskie Szczecin of the Polish Basketball League.

=== Return to the Netherlands (2015–2016) ===
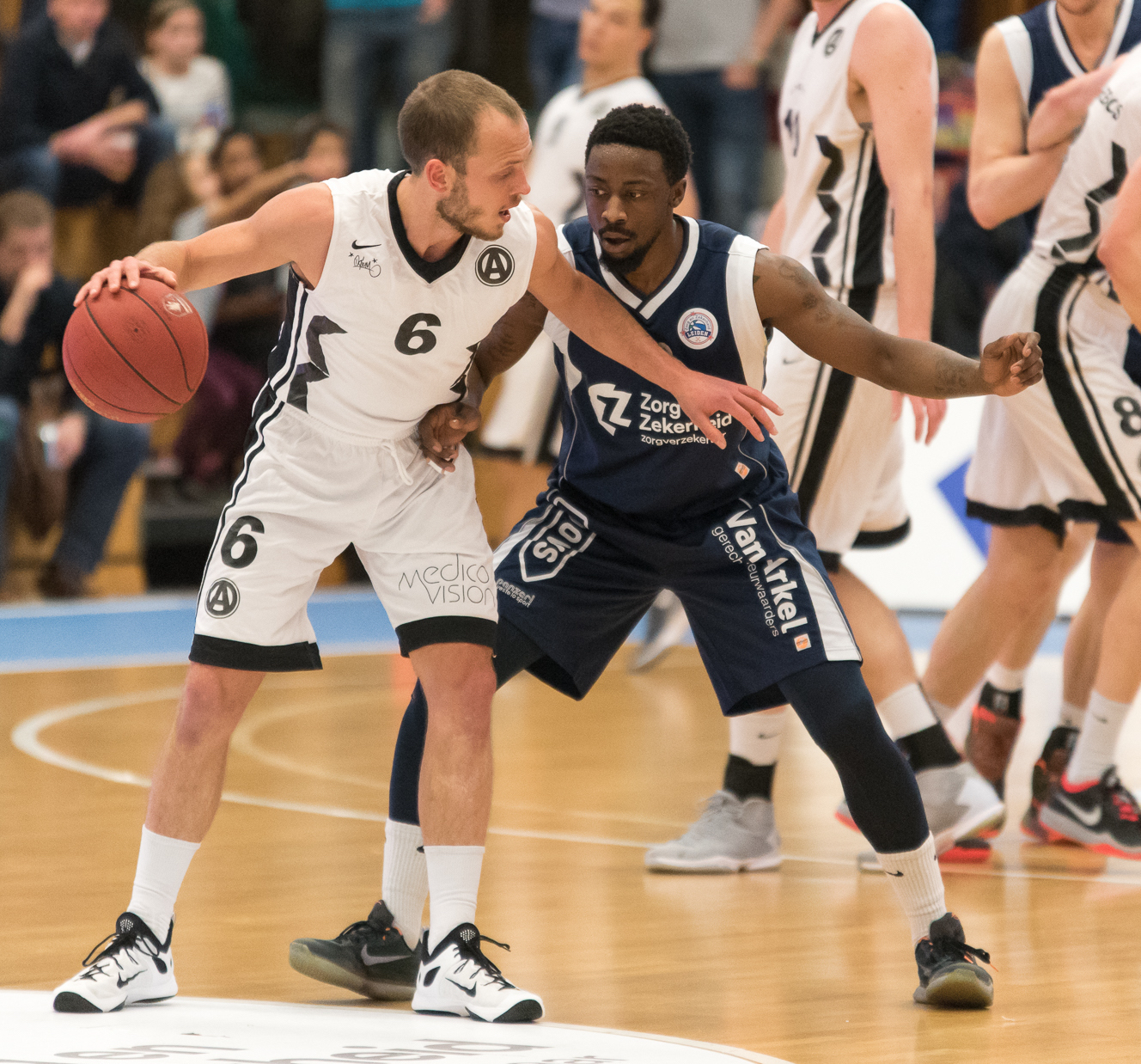
Wright defending Aron Royé in a DBL season game

On October 30, 2015, Wright was acquired by the Fort Wayne Mad Ants of the NBA Development League following a successful tryout with the team. However, he was waived on November 9 before playing for them.

On December 2, 2015, Wright returned to the Netherlands when he signed a 1,5-year contract with Zorg en Zekerheid Leiden.

On November 4, 2016, ZZ Leiden announced it had released Wright after he suffered from a season-ending knee injury.

== Coaching career ==
In May 2021, Wright was hired as the head men's basketball coach at Clark Montessori High School in Cincinnati. In four years with the Cougars, Wright compiled a 37–56 record, with the team recording more wins than the last in each season. In 2024, the Cougars went 17–9 and reached the Division 5 regional finals, where they fell to Summit Country Day.

Wright was hired by Walnut Hills High School to be their head men's basketball coach on April 28, 2025.

== Honors ==
Cincinnati (NCAA)

- MVP Global Sports Classic: 2012
- All-Big East tournament Team: 2012

Donar

- Dutch Cup: 2013–14
- Dutch Basketball League: 2013–14
- All-DBL Team: 2014
- DBL All-Star: 2014
