= BV Den Helder =

Dutch basketball club

Den Helder Kings
- Leagues: Dutch Basketball League
- Founded: 1981; 44 years ago (Note: The original Den Helder professional team was founded in 1981. It went bankrupt and disappeared in 2009. The team returned in 2012. In 2014, Den Helder Kings was declared bankrupt.)
- Dissolved: 2014; 11 years ago
- Arena: De Slenk (1981–1992); Quelderduijn (1992–2005, 2007–2009); KingsDome (2012–2014)
- Capacity: 1,500
- Location: Den Helder, Netherlands
- Team colors: White, Navy Blue, Azure
- Head coach: List of head coaches
- Championships: 6 Dutch Championships; 1 Dutch Cup
Home	Away	Third

BV Den Helder was a professional basketball club from Den Helder, Netherlands. The team had several seasons in the Dutch Basketball League, the highest professional league in the Netherlands. The club is currently inactive, however Den Helder Suns has replaced the club as professional team from Den Helder.

The club has won the Dutch League six times and the NBB Cup once. The club had a long history of financial troubles, with the club being dissolved three times. The last time the club appeared at the highest level was in 2014, as the professional team was declared bankrupt during that season.

== History ==
The club was founded in 1981, as a separation was made between amateur sports club BV Noordkop. BV Den Helder became the separated professional team. The club played in the Eredivisie in its first season. Home games were played in Sporthal Sportlaan and Sporthal de Slenk. With coach Ton Boot the club experienced its best years: the team won the championship six times between 1989 and 1998. Den Helder won the NBB Cup in 1992. In 2005, the club was forced to leave the Dutch Basketball League because of a shortage of money. The club played a few years in an amateur competition. Den Helder returned to the professional level in 2007, but after two seasons the club was declared bankrupt.

=== Den Helder Kings era ===
In 2012 the club changed its name to Den Helder Kings, as the first team returned to the Dutch Basketball League again. In its first season the team played in its new home arena KingsDome. The new head coach was Belgian Jean-Marc Jaumin. After a solid first season with a sixth place, the Kings really performed in the following season.

In the 2013–14 season, the team led by Manny Ubilla finished third in the regular season. Before the 2014 Playoffs, the name of the club was changed to "Port of Den Helder Kings" after the club started a conjunction with the Port of Den Helder. In the playoffs, the team beat Magixx 2–0 in the quarterfinals before being swept by SPM Shoeters Den Bosch in the semifinals.

In the 2014–15 season, financial problems troubled the Kings. The team had a €200,000 deficit in their budget and in December the professional team was declared bankrupt. All results of the team were removed and the Kings were expelled from the DBL.

=== Den Helder Suns ===
In 2016, a new professional team in the city was founded with the Den Helder Suns which entered the 2016–17 DBL season.

=== Names ===
Since its establishment the club frequently changed its name due to sponsorship deals.

- 1981–1984: Albert van Zoonen/Cracks
- 1984–1986: Doppeldouche
- 1986–1989: Direktbank
- 1989–1992: Commodore
- 1992–1995: Mustang Jeans Den Helder
- 1995–1997: René Colthof
- 1997–2000: Hans Verkerk
- 2000–2001: Conesco
- 2001–2003: CEB/Noordkop
- 2003–2005: Cape Holland
- 2005–2007: BlueStream Seals
- 2007–2009: Den Helder Seals
- 2012–2014: Den Helder Kings
- 2014: Port of Den Helder Kings

=== Logos ===
2007–2009
Den Helder Seals

2012–2014
Den Helder Kings

== Arenas ==
Arenas
Arena	Tenure
De Slenk	1981–1992
Quelderduijn	1992–2005
Quelderduijn	2007–2009
KingsDome	2012–2014

== Honours ==
Dutch Basketball League

- Winners (6): 1988–89, 1989–90, 1990–91, 1991–92, 1994–95, 1997–98

Dutch Cup

- Winners (1): 1991–92

== Season by season ==
Season	Domestic competitions				Dutch Cup	European competitions		
Season	Tier	League	Pos.	Postseason	Dutch Cup	Tier	League	Result
1981–82	1	Eredivisie	10	–	–	—		
1982–83	1	Eredivisie	8	–	–	—		
1983–84	1	Eredivisie	8	–	–	—		
1984–85	1	Eredivisie	7	–	–	—		
1985–86	1	Eredivisie	2	Finalist	–	—		
1986–87	1	Eredivisie	2	Finalist	–	—		
1987–88	1	Eredivisie	3	Semifinalist	–	—		
1988–89	1	Eredivisie	2	Champion	–	—		
1989–90	1	Eredivisie	1	Champion	–	1	Champions Cup	QF
1990–91	1	Eredivisie	1	Champion	–	1	Champions Cup	RS
1991–92	1	Eredivisie	2	Champion	Champion	1	European League	RS
1992–93	1	Eredivisie	2	Semifinalist	–	1	European League	QR
1993–94	1	Eredivisie	1	Semifinalist	Champion	—		
1994–95	1	Eredivisie	1	Champion	Finalist	—		
1995–96	1	Eredivisie	2	Finalist	–	1	European League	RS
1996–97	1	Eredivisie	4	Quarterfinalist	–	—		
1997–98	1	Eredivisie	1	Champion	Finalist	—		
1998–99	1	Eredivisie	2	Finalist	Finalist	—		
1999–00	1	Eredivisie	7	Semifinalist	–	—		
2001–02	1	Eredivisie	2	Quarterfinalist	–	—		
2002–03	1	Eredivisie	6	Quarterfinalist	–	—		
2003–04	1	Eredivisie	7	Quarterfinalist	–	—		
2004–05	1	Eredivisie	6	Quarterfinalist	–	—		
2005–07	Did not play							
2007–08	1	Eredivisie	11	–	–	—		
2008–09	1	Eredivisie	11	–	–	—		
2009–13	Inactive							
2012–13	1	DBL	6	Quarterfinalist	Quarterfinalist	—		
2013–14	1	DBL	3	Semifinalist	Quarterfinalist	—		
2014–15	1	DBL	Dissolved in December 2014.					

== European record ==
Season	Competition	Round	Club	Home	Away	Agg
1989–90	FIBA European Champions Cup	First round	(West Germany) Steiner Bayreuth	97–75	79–97	176–174
1989–90	FIBA European Champions Cup	Second round	(Belgium) Maes Pils	99–70	70–84	169–154
1989–90	FIBA European Champions Cup	Quarterfinal round	Seven opponents			7th place (2–12)
1991–92	FIBA European Cup	Second round	(Israel) Maccabi Rishon LeZion	73–55	75–89	148–144
1991–92	FIBA European Cup	Regular season	Seven opponents			7th place (2–12)
1992–93	FIBA European Cup	First round	(Russia) CSKA Moscow	74–79	95–94	168–174
1993–94	FIBA European Cup	Second round	(Republic of Ireland) St. Vincent's	97–66	77–61	174–124
1993–94	FIBA European Cup	Third round	(North Macedonia) Rabotnički	92–76	62–85	154–171
1994–95	FIBA European Cup	First round	(Ukraine) Kyiv	89–70	63–89	152–159
1995–96	FIBA European Cup	First round	(France) Pau-Orthez	72–94	57–88	139–182
1996–97	FIBA Korać Cup	First round	(Portugal) Queluz	73–71	73–78	146–149
1997–98	FIBA Korać Cup	First round	(Luxembourg) Sparta Bertrange	93–64	54–47	147–111
1997–98	FIBA Korać Cup	Group stage	(Germany) Bamberg (Portugal) Benfica (France) Montpellier			4th place (0–6)
1998–99	FIBA Saporta Cup	Group stage	Five opponents			5th place (4–6)

Notes

1. Den Helder points are listed first.

== Players ==
=== Individual awards ===
DBL Most Valuable Player

- (United States) Jose Waitman – 1987

DBL Most Improved Player

- (Netherlands) Jeroen van der List – 2013, 2014

DBL Rookie of the Year

- (Netherlands) Eric van der Sluis – 1993
- (Netherlands) Tjoe de Paula – 2002

DBL All-Stars

- (United States) Manny Ubilla – 2014
- (United States) Justin Knox – 2014

=== Notable players ===
Note: Flags indicate national team eligibility at FIBA-sanctioned events. Players may hold other non-FIBA nationalities not displayed.

Criteria

To appear in this section a player must have either:

- Set a club record or won an individual award while at the club
- Played at least one official international match for their national team at any time
- Played at least one official NBA match at any time.

- (Netherlands) Chris Mims
- (Netherlands) Serge Zwikker
- (Netherlands) Peter van Paassen
- (Netherlands) Thomas Koenis
- (Netherlands) Jeroen van der List
- (Netherlands) Rogier Jansen
- (Netherlands) Tjoe de Paula
- (United States) Jerry Beck (3 season: 1993–94, 1996–99)
- (United States) Justin Knox
- (Puerto Rico) Manny Ubilla (1 season: 2013–14)
- (Uganda) Stanley Ocitti (1 season: 2003–04)

== Head coaches ==
BV Den Helder

- (Netherlands) Ton Boot (1985–1993)
- (Netherlands) Meindert van Veen (1993–1995)

Den Helder Seals

- (Netherlands) Peter van Noord (2007–2009)

Den Helder Kings

- (Belgium) Jean-Marc Jaumin (2012–2014)
