= 2017–18 Dutch Basketball League squads =

This article displays the squads of the teams that competed in 2017–18 Dutch Basketball League (DBL). BAL and Den Helder Suns played their debut seasons in the DBL.

As of 24 October 2017.

== Rules ==
For the 2017–18 season, league policy was changed and the number of allowed foreign players per team was increased from 4 to 5. Additional was the restriction that a team is not allowed to have five foreign players on the court at the same time.

== Import players by nationality ==
Country	Total
United States	19
Belgium	2
British Virgin Islands	1
Lithuania	1
Syria	1
Canada	1
Suriname	1
Croatia	1
Luxembourg	1

== Note ==
Note: Flags indicate national team eligibility at FIBA-sanctioned events. Players may hold other non-FIBA nationalities not displayed.

== Apollo Amsterdam ==
Apollo Amsterdam roster
Players
Coaches

Pos.	No.	Nat.	Name
F	0	(Netherlands)	Eduardo, Akeel
F	1	(Netherlands)	van Ravensteijn, Rens
G	3	(Syria)	Madanly, Michael
F	4	(Belgium)	Janssens, Benjamin
G	5	(Netherlands)	Bruining, Mack
G	6	(Netherlands)	Faijdherbe, Lucas
G	9	(Netherlands)	Landbrug, Yawene
C	10	(Netherlands)	van Schaik, Max
C	12	(Netherlands)	Markusse, Jesse
G	13	(Netherlands)	van der Horst, Dimeo
F	14	(Netherlands)	Enaruna, Tristan
F	15	(Netherlands)	Landbrug, Asante
F	17	(Netherlands)	Enaruna, Iyen
F/C	20	(Netherlands)	Weijs, Berend

Head coach

- (Netherlands) Patrick Faijdherbe

Assistant coach(es)

- (Netherlands) Peter van Paassen
- (Canada) Phil Winram

Legend

- (C) Team captain
- Injured

- Roster
Updated: 24 October 2017

== Aris Leeuwarden ==
Aris Leeuwarden roster
Players
Coaches

Pos.	No.	Nat.	Name	Ht.
G	2	(United States)	Blackman, Emile	1.91 m (6 ft 3 in)
G	3	(Netherlands)	Thomas, Nathanael	1.83 m (6 ft 0 in)
G/F	4	(Netherlands)	Peterson, Leroy	1.85 m (6 ft 1 in)
G	5	(Netherlands)	Mladenovic, Stefan	1.93 m (6 ft 4 in)
F/C	6	(Netherlands)	Lemke, Sven	1.88 m (6 ft 2 in)
PG	7	(Lithuania)	Kumelis, Deividas	2.05 m (6 ft 9 in)
F	8	(Netherlands)	Bunschoten, Niels	2.03 m (6 ft 8 in)
G	10	(Netherlands)	Lietmeijer, Valentijn	1.91 m (6 ft 3 in)
F	11	(United States)	Kratch, Nate	2.03 m (6 ft 8 in)
C	12	(Canada)	Lufile, Meshack	2.03 m (6 ft 8 in)
C	13	(United States)	Heath, Josiah	2.06 m (6 ft 9 in)
C	14	(Netherlands)	Musters, Nathaniel	2.08 m (6 ft 10 in)

Head coach

- (Belgium) Tony van den Bosch

Legend

- (C) Team captain
- Injured

- Roster
Updated: 24 October 2017

== BAL ==
BAL roster
Players
Coaches

Pos.	No.	Nat.	Name
G	4	(Netherlands)	Gorissen, Nino
G	5	(Netherlands)	van Overbeek, Roel
G	6	(Netherlands)	Ramovic, Irfan
F	7	(Netherlands)	Schild, Jules
F	8	(Netherlands)	van Tongeren, Matthew
G	9	(Netherlands)	van Dijk, Sam
F	10	(Netherlands)	Gijsen, Jan
F	11	(Netherlands)	van der List, Jeroen
F	12	(Netherlands)	Nossek, Wietze
G	13	(Netherlands)	Rosenmuller, Daan
C	14	(Netherlands)	Aarts, Roel
C	15	(Netherlands)	Brussen, Yarick

Head coach

- (Serbia) Radenko Varagic

Assistant coach(es)

- (Netherlands) Koen van Gerwen

Legend

- (C) Team captain
- Injured

- Roster
Updated: 24 October 2017

== Den Helder Suns ==
Den Helder Suns roster
Players
Coaches

Pos.	No.	Nat.	Name	Ht.
PG	4	(United States)	Dority, LaVonte	1.85 m (6 ft 1 in)
G	5	(Netherlands)	de Paula, Tjoe	1.85 m (6 ft 1 in)
G	6	(Netherlands)	Thran, Nick	1.85 m (6 ft 1 in)
F	7	(Netherlands)	Hoogsteden, Ole	2.04 m (6 ft 8 in)
G	8	(Netherlands)	Lugtenburg, Neill	1.84 m (6 ft 0 in)
F	9	(Netherlands)	Cup, Dennis	2.00 m (6 ft 7 in)
F	10	(Netherlands)	Kolhorn, Mickey	2.02 m (6 ft 8 in)
F	11	(Netherlands)	Koopman, Tom	2.03 m (6 ft 8 in)
G	12	(Netherlands)	van Veen, Niels	1.87 m (6 ft 2 in)
G	13	(Netherlands)	van der Vuurst-de Vries, Boyd	1.87 m (6 ft 2 in)
F	14	(Netherlands)	de Boer, Shem	2.02 m (6 ft 8 in)
C	15	(Netherlands)	Halman, Dyon	2.04 m (6 ft 8 in)
C	16	(Netherlands)	Pomstra, Jarno	2.14 m (7 ft 0 in)
F	22	(Luxembourg)	Laurent, Alex	1.98 m (6 ft 6 in)
C	42	(United States)	McConico, Quinterian	2.03 m (6 ft 8 in)

Head coach

- (Netherlands) Peter van Noord

Legend

- (C) Team captain
- Injured

- Roster
Updated: 2017-09-09

== Donar ==
Donar roster
Players
Coaches

Pos.	No.	Nat.	Name	Ht.
CG	1	(Netherlands)	Cunningham, Sean	1.88 m (6 ft 2 in)
PG	3	(Netherlands)	Royé, Aron	1.95 m (6 ft 5 in)
SG	6	(Netherlands)	Koopmans, Sjoerd (DP)	1.95 m (6 ft 5 in)
SF	8	(Netherlands)	Dourisseau, Jason (C)	1.96 m (6 ft 5 in)
F	12	(Netherlands)	Maring, Daan (DP)	2.00 m (6 ft 7 in)
C	14	(Netherlands)	Koenis, Thomas	2.10 m (6 ft 11 in)
C	15	(Netherlands)	Mast, Rienk (DP)	2.02 m (6 ft 8 in)
PG	20	(United States)	Curry, Brandyn (I)	1.91 m (6 ft 3 in)
G/F	21	(Netherlands)	Hoeve, Tim (DP)	1.96 m (6 ft 5 in)
PF	24	(United States)	Bruinsma, Evan (I)	2.02 m (6 ft 8 in)
G/F	31	(United States)	Domingo, Stephen (I)	2.01 m (6 ft 7 in)
C	33	(Croatia)	Pasalic, Drago (I)	2.08 m (6 ft 10 in)
G	44	(Netherlands)	Slagter, Arvin	1.90 m (6 ft 3 in)
SG		(United States)	Gipson, Teddy (I)	1.92 m (6 ft 4 in)

Head coach

(Netherlands) Erik Braal

Assistant coach(es)

(Netherlands) Meindert van Veen

Legend

- (C) Team captain
- (DP) Development player
- (I) Import player
- Injured

- Roster
Updated: 24 October 2017

== Forward Lease Rotterdam ==
Forward Lease Rotterdam roster
Players
Coaches

Pos.	No.	Nat.	Name
C	1	(Netherlands)	Krabbendam, Robert
G	3	(Netherlands)	Averink, Kasper
G	5	(Belgium)	Kanda, Ordane
F	6	(Netherlands)	Stolk, Coen
G	7	(Netherlands)	Bouwer, Maik
G	9	(Netherlands)	Theeuwkens, Ties
G	10	(Netherlands)	Kok, Michael
F	11	(United States)	Setty, Trevor
F/C	24	(United States)	Commons, Chris
C	44	(Netherlands)	de Baat, Jeroen

Head coach

- (Netherlands) Armand Salomon

Assistant coach(es)

- (Netherlands) Vincent van Sliedregt

Legend

- (C) Team captain
- Injured

- Roster
Updated: 24 October 2017

== Landstede ==
Landstede Basketbal roster
Players
Coaches

Pos.	No.	Nat.	Name
G	5	(United States)	Dorsey-Walker, Sherron
F	6	(Netherlands)	Witteveen, Lenno
G	7	(Netherlands)	van Oostrum, Nigel
F	8	(Netherlands)	Helfrich, Keime
G	9	(Netherlands)	Schilder, Mike
G	10	(United States)	Gregory, Jordan
F	11	(Netherlands)	Wirjo, Elay
C	12	(Netherlands)	de Pagter, Ralf
F	14	(Netherlands)	Schaftenaar, Olaf
C	16	(Netherlands)	Vos, Freek
F	20	(United States)	House, Franko
F	42	(United States)	Dahlman, Noah

Head coach

- (Netherlands) Herman van den Belt

Assistant coach(es)

- (Netherlands) Mark van Schutterhoef

Legend

- (C) Team captain
- Injured

- Roster
Updated: 24 October 2017

== New Heroes ==
New Heroes roster
Players
Coaches

Pos.	No.	Nat.	Name
G	0	(United States)	Marshall, Anthony
G	2	(Netherlands)	Bouwknecht, Maarten
F	3	(United States)	Miklusak, Mike
F	7	(Netherlands)	Wessels, Stefan
F	9	(Netherlands)	van den Elzen, Stan
C	10	(Netherlands)	Bleeker, Kevin
F	12	(Netherlands)	Akerboom, Jr., Kees
C	14	(Netherlands)	Oudendag, Nick
F	17	(Netherlands)	de Vries, Pim
F	21	(British Virgin Islands)	Carey, Norville
G	73	(United States)	Sherrill, Keshun

Head coach

- (Croatia) Silvano Poropat

Assistant coach(es)

- (Netherlands) Jeroen van Vugt

Legend

- (C) Team captain
- Injured

- Roster
Updated: 24 October 2017

== ZZ Leiden ==
Zorg en Zekerheid Leiden roster
Players
Coaches

Pos.	No.	Nat.	Name
G	5	(Netherlands)	Ververs, Marijn
PF	8	(Suriname)	De Randamie, Sergio
G/F	10	(Netherlands)	Hoonhout, Okke
F	11	(Netherlands)	Kherazzi, Mohamed
PG	12	(United States)	Love, Carrington
F	13	(Netherlands)	Versteeg, Floris
F/C	15	(Netherlands)	Biekman, Leratho
PG	17	(Netherlands)	Butter, Rens
SG	18	(Netherlands)	de Jong, Worthy
PF	22	(United States)	Vette, Clayton
G	28	(Netherlands)	Voorn, Jessey

Head coach

- (Belgium) Paul Vervaeck

Legend

- (C) Team captain
- (I) Import player
- Injured

- Roster
- Transactions
Updated: 11 October 2017
