= 2018–19 Feyenoord Basketball season =

Feyenoord Basketball
2018–19 season
- Chairman: Armand Salomon
- Head coach: Jan Stalman (interim); Richard den Os
- Arena: Topsportcentrum
- Dutch Basketball League: 8th
- NBB Cup: Fourth round
Home	Away

The 2018–19 Feyenoord Basketball season was the 65th season in the existence of the club. The club will play in the Dutch Basketball League (DBL) and NBB Cup.

It was the first season as Feyenoord Basketball and the first season under head coach Richard den Os. On 2 March 2019, Den Os resigned as head coach, Jan Stalman replaced him as interim.

== Players ==
=== Squad information ===
Feyenoord roster
Players
Coaches

Pos.	No.	Nat.	Name	Ht.	Age
SF	0	(Netherlands)	Otmar Creesburg	1.93 m (6 ft 4 in)	28 – 24 February 1997
C	1	(Netherlands)	Robert Krabbendam	2.12 m (6 ft 11 in)	38 – 11 July 1986
F	2	(Netherlands)	Max Hirz	1.94 m (6 ft 4 in)	25 – 25 July 1999
SG	3	(Netherlands)	Sam van Dijk	1.94 m (6 ft 4 in)	28 – 28 August 1996
SF	4	(United States)	Justin Gordon	1.98 m (6 ft 6 in)	31 – 20 December 1993
PG	5	(Netherlands)	Pavle Latinovic	1.85 m (6 ft 1 in)	24 – 1 July 2000
F	6	(Netherlands)	Coen Stolk	1.95 m (6 ft 5 in)	27 – 26 June 1997
PG	7	(Italy)	Emanuele Montaguti	1.78 m (5 ft 10 in)	31 – 12 October 1993
SF	8	(United States)	Trevor Setty	2.03 m (6 ft 8 in)	35 – 28 October 1989
G/F	9	(Netherlands)	Ties Theeuwkens (C)	1.90 m (6 ft 3 in)	40 – 15 January 1985
G/F	10	(Netherlands)	Michael Kok	1.92 m (6 ft 4 in)	33 – 19 September 1991
C	11	(Netherlands)	Jeroen van der List	2.13 m (7 ft 0 in)	35 – 9 December 1989
F	12	(Netherlands)	Mert Lamba	1.98 m (6 ft 6 in)	24 – 18 November 2000
F	13	(Netherlands)	Rens van Ravensteijn	2.00 m (6 ft 7 in)	29 – 16 June 1995

Head coach

(Netherlands) Jan Stalman

Assistant coach(es)

(Netherlands) Carlo Falchi

Legend

- (C) Team captain
- (DP) Development player
- (I) Import player
- Injured

- Roster
Updated: 31 July 2019

Note: Flags indicate national team eligibility at FIBA-sanctioned events. Players may hold other non-FIBA nationalities not displayed.

== Transactions ==
=== In ===
No.	Pos.	Nat.	Name	Age	Moving from		Type	Ends	Date	Source
7	PG	(Italy)	Emanuele Montaguti	24	Free agent		Free	Undisclosed	7 August 2018	
11	C	(Netherlands)	Jeroen van der List	28	Aris Leeuwarden	(Netherlands)	Free	Undisclosed	7 August 2018	
4	F	(United States)	Justin Gordon	24	Amal Essaouira	(Morocco)	Free	Undisclosed	7 August 2018	
12	PG	(United States)	La'Shard Anderson	29	Near East University	(Turkey)	Free	Undisclosed	7 August 2018	
3	G	(Netherlands)	Sam van Dijk	21	BAL	(Netherlands)	Free	Undisclosed	7 August 2018	
13	F	(Netherlands)	Rens van Ravensteijn	23	Apollo Amsterdam	(Netherlands)	Free	Undisclosed	7 August 2018	

=== Out ===
No.	Pos.	Nat.	Name	Age	Moving to		Type	Date	Source
5	PG	(Belgium)	Ordane Kanda-Kanyndia	21	Kangoeroes Mechelen	(Belgium)	End of contract	1 July 2019	
8	SF	(Netherlands)	Maik Bouwer	20	Free agent		End of contract	1 July 2019	
12	C	(United States)	Marcel Boyd	26	Free agent		End of contract	1 July 2019	
2	PG	(Canada)	Joey Puddister	26	Sudbury Five	(Canada)	End of contract	1 July 2019	
7	F	(Syria)	Michael Madanly	37	Free agent		End of contract	1 July 2019	
44	C	(Netherlands)	Ruben Blaakman	19	Free agent		End of contract	1 July 2019	
3	SF	(Netherlands)	Jason Rijaard	20	Free agent		End of contract	1 July 2019	

== Dutch Basketball League ==
=== Playoffs ===
Win Loss

Quarterfinals

30 April 2019 Game 1	ZZ Leiden	96–72	Feyenoord	Leiden
	Pts: Watson Jr. 33; Rebs: Vette 14; Asts: Watson Jr. 5	Report	Pts: Setty 23; Rebs: Gordon 8 Asts: Van der List 4	Arena: Vijf Meihal

30 April 2019 Game 2	Feyenoord	68–103	ZZ Leiden	Rotterdam
	Pts: Gordon 15; Rebs: Gordon 8 Asts: Kok 4	Report	Pts: Watson Jr. 22; Rebs: Simms 9 Asts: Thompson 9	Arena: Topsportcentrum Rotterdam
