= 2019–20 Heroes Den Bosch season =

Heroes Den Bosch
2019–20 season
- Chairman: Bob van Oosterhout
- Head coach: Jean-Marc Jaumin
- Arena: Maaspoort
- Dutch Basketball League: 4th and cancelled
- Basketball Cup: Fourth Round
- FIBA Europe Cup: Qualifying Round
Home	Away

The 2019–20 Heroes Den Bosch season was the 68th season in the existence of Heroes Den Bosch. The club will play in the Dutch Basketball League (DBL) and NBB Cup. The season was cancelled prematurely because of the COVID-19 pandemic.

This will be the first season under head coach Jean-Marc Jaumin, who signed a two-year contract on 28 June 2019. On 21 August 2019, New Heroes announced it was changing the club name to Heroes Den Bosch. It was the first season under this new name.

== Players ==
=== Squad information ===
Heroes Den Bosch roster
Players
Coaches

Pos.	No.	Nat.	Name	Ht.	Wt.	Age
PF	0	(United States)	Seger Bonifant	2.01 m (6 ft 7 in)	91 kg (201 lb)	31 – 5 October 1993
PG	1	(United States)	Siyani Chambers	1.83 m (6 ft 0 in)	77 kg (170 lb)	31 – 14 December 1993
G	2	(Netherlands)	Boy van Vliet	1.94 m (6 ft 4 in)	79 kg (174 lb)	30 – 13 July 1994
PF	7	(Netherlands)	Stefan Wessels (C)	2.03 m (6 ft 8 in)	100 kg (220 lb)	40 – 13 April 1984
SG	8	(Sweden)	Elijah Clarance	1.93 m (6 ft 4 in)	86 kg (190 lb)	26 – 3 July 1998
G/F	9	(Netherlands)	Stan van den Elzen	1.96 m (6 ft 5 in)		24 – 27 May 2000
F	10	(Netherlands)	Norbert Thelissen	2.0 m (6 ft 7 in)		24 – 19 April 2000
G/F	11	(United States)	Henry Caruso	1.93 m (6 ft 4 in)	88 kg (194 lb)	29 – 1 July 1995
C	21	(Netherlands)	Thomas van der Mars	2.08 m (6 ft 10 in)	107 kg (236 lb)	34 – 15 November 1990
SG	22	(United States)	Elijah Wilson	1.93 m (6 ft 4 in)	93 kg (205 lb)	30 – 19 May 1994
PF	31	(United States)	Nathan Krill	2.02 m (6 ft 8 in)	95 kg (209 lb)	29 – 26 February 1996
PF/C	74	(Netherlands)	Henk Norel	2.11 m (6 ft 11 in)	104 kg (229 lb)	37 – 17 September 1987

Head coach

- (Belgium) Jean-Marc Jaumin

Assistant coach(es)

- (Spain) Angel Aranda
- (Netherlands) Jeroen van Vugt

Legend

- (C) Team captain
- (DP) Development player
- (I) Import player
- Injured

- Roster
Updated: 6 March 2020

Note: Flags indicate national team eligibility at FIBA-sanctioned events. Players may hold other non-FIBA nationalities not displayed.

=== Depth chart ===
Pos.	Starting 5	Bench 1	Bench 2
C	Thomas van der Mars
PF	Nathan Krill	Stefan Wessels
SF	Henry Caruso	Seger Bonifant	Stan van den Elzen
SG	Elijah Wilson		Norbert Thelissen
PG	Siyani Chambers	Elijah Clarence	Ids Rebergen

== Transactions ==
=== In ===
No.	Pos.	Nat.	Name	Age	Moving from		Type	Ends	Date	Source
0	PF	(United States)	Seger Bonifant	25	Ehingen Urspring	(Germany)	Free	Undisclosed	10 July 2019	
11	F	(United States)	Henry Caruso	24	Santa Clara Broncos	(United States)	Free	Undisclosed	14 July 2019	
21	C	(Netherlands)	Thomas van der Mars	28	Okapi Aalstar	(Belgium)	Free	2022	30 July 2019	
22	SG	(United States)	Elijah Wilson	25	Kapfenberg Bulls	(Austria)	Free	Undisclosed	5 August 2019	
8	SG	(Sweden)	Elijah Clarance	21	Skyliners Frankfurt	(Germany)	Loan	2020	9 August 2019	
31	PF	(United States)	Nathan Krill	23	San Francisco Dons	(United States)	Free	Undisclosed	9 August 2019	
1	PG	(United States)	Siyani Chambers	25	Gießen 46ers	(Germany)	Free	Undisclosed	21 August 2019	
2	G	(Netherlands)	Boy van Vliet	25	Den Helder Suns	(Netherlands)	Free	2021	12 October 2019	
74	C	(Netherlands)	Henk Norel	32	Breogán	(Spain)	Free	2021	9 December 2019	
35	G	(Belgium)	Ordane Kanda	23	Spirou	(Belgium)	Free	2021	4 February 2019	

=== Out ===
No.	Pos.	Nat.	Name	Age	Moving to		Type	Date	Source
42	PG	(United States)	Vernon Taylor	32	Keravnos	(Cyprus)	End of contract	11 July 2019	
35	PF/C	(United States)	Payton Henson	32	GTK Gliwice	(Poland)	End of contract	25 July 2019	
1	PG	(United Kingdom)	Devon van Oostrum	26	Prienai	(Lithuania)	End of contract	4 August 2019	
11	C	(Netherlands)	Roel Aarts	25	BAL	(Netherlands)	Mutual consent	17 August 2019	
2	G	(Netherlands)	Maarten Bouwknecht	25	Worcester Wolves	(England)	End of contract	20 August 2019	
73	CG	(United States)	Keshun Sherrill	24	Yalova Belediye	(Turkey)	End of contract	1 July 2019	
14	C	(Netherlands)	Nick Oudendag	32			End of contract	1 July 2019	
3	G	(Netherlands)	Ids Rebergen	19	Filou Oostende 2	(Belgium)	Released	27 September 2019	
28	SG	(Netherlands)	Jessey Voorn	29			Mutual consent	14 November 2019	

== Preseason ==
Win Loss

30 August 2019 1	Belfius Mons-Hainaut (Belgium)	75–59	(Netherlands) Heroes Den Bosch	Mons
		Report		Arena: Mons Arena

7 September 2019 2	Schalke 04 (Germany)	79–81	(Netherlands) Heroes Den Bosch	Gelsenkirchen
				Arena: Halle an der Mülbachstraße

12 September 2019 3	Heroes Den Bosch (Netherlands)	84–64	(Netherlands) Apollo Amsterdam	's-Hertogenbosch
				Arena: Maaspoort

14 September 2019 4	Spirou (Belgium)	86–76	(Netherlands) Heroes Den Bosch	Charleroi
		Report		Arena: Spiroudome

20 September 2019 5	Telenet Giants Antwerp (Belgium)	84–59	(Netherlands) Heroes Den Bosch	Antwerp
				Arena: Sportpark Joris Verhagen

== Dutch Basketball League ==
=== Regular season ===
Game	Date	Venue	Opponents	Result	High points	High rebounds	High assists	Record
1	28 September 2019	A	Aris Leeuwarden	60–85	Elijah Wilson (17)	Thomas van der Mars (10)	Wilson, Voorn (3)	1–0
2	8 October 2019	H	Den Helder Suns	94–69	Elijah Wilson (23)	Thomas van der Mars (10)	Siyani Chambers (9)	2–0
3	5 October 2019	A	Donar	91–75	Elijah Wilson (22)	Thomas van der Mars (9)	Elijah Clarance (4)	2–1
4	10 October 2019	A	Apollo Amsterdam	57–103	Henry Caruso (21)	Thomas van der Mars (7)	Elijah Clarance (9)	3–1
5	19 October 2019	H	Apollo Amsterdam	113–67	Chambers, Caruso (16)	Nathan Krill (7)	Elijah Clarance (10)	4–1
6	27 October 2019	A	Landstede Hammers	93–80	Elijah Wilson (27)	Henry Caruso 8	Elijah Clarance (6)	4–2
7	2 November 2019	H	ZZ Leiden	109–83	Henry Caruso (23)	Wilson, Krill (7)	Siyani Chambers (10)	5–2
