= 2017–18 NBB Cup =

NBB Cup
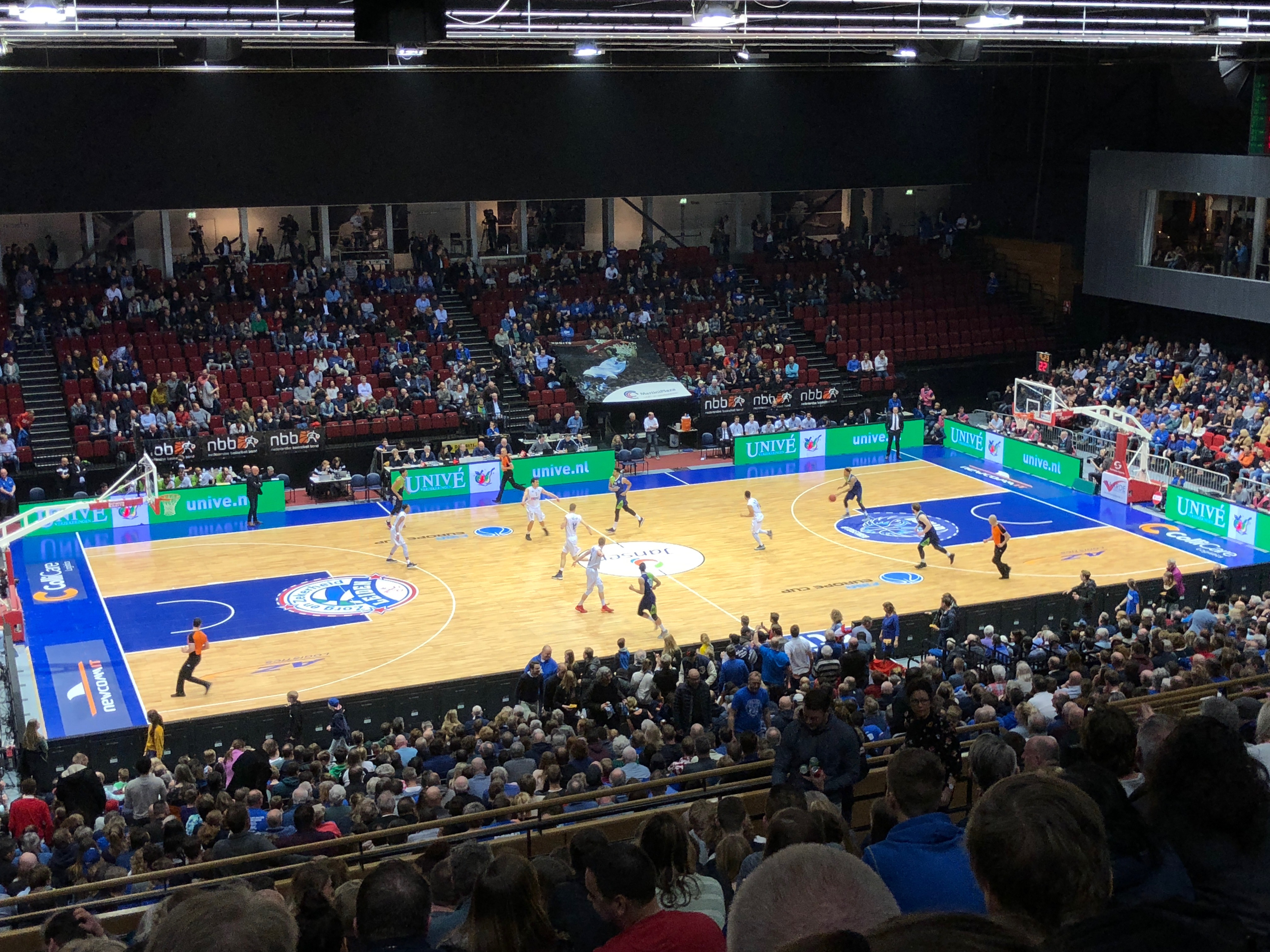
- The Final in the MartiniPlaza on 25 March
- Season: 2017–18
- Duration: 14 October 2017 – 25 March 2018
- Teams: 52

Finals
- Champions: Donar (6th title)
- Runners-up: ZZ Leiden

The 2017–18 NBB Cup (Dutch: 2017–18 NBB-Beker) was the 50th edition of the Netherlands' national basketball cup tournament. Donar was the defending champion. Donar successfully defended its title, after beating runners-up ZZ Leiden in the Final. The Final was played on 25 March 2018 in MartiniPlaza in Groningen.

== Format ==
In the first, second and third round teams from the Dutch second, third and fourth division participate. From the fourth round, teams from the Dutch Basketball League (DBL) enter the competition. Quarter- and semi-finals are played in a two-legged format. When a team form a tier lower than the DBL played a DBL team, one win is sufficient for the latter to advance to the next round.

== Round and draw dates ==
Round	Draw date	Dates
First round	October 2017	14 October 2017
Second round	October 2017	6 November 2017
Third round	October 2017	25 November 2017
Fourth round	28 November 2017	13 December 2017–9 January 2018
Quarter-finals	21 December 2017	16 January–1 February 2018
Semi-finals	1 February 2018	13 February–13 March 2018
Final	1 February 2018	25 March 2018

== Bracket ==
Fourth round
9 January
Apollo Amsterdam	58
New Heroes	104
20 December
BV Groningen	57
Aris Leeuwarden	86
14 December
Onze Gezellen	58
Solar-systemen Grasshoppers	74
21 December
ZZ Leiden	101
Forward Lease Rotterdam	87
4 January
BAL 2	65
Den Helder Suns	90
14 December
Almere Pioneers	51
Landstede	83
5 January
The Black Eagles	75
Racing Beverwijk	85
Donar	w/o
BAL (Note: On 10 December 2017, BAL withdrew its first team from the tournament. Consequently, Donar automatically advanced to the quarter-finals.)

Quarter-finals
16–31 January
New Heroes	85	49	134
Aris Leeuwarden	58	84	142
25 January
Solar-systemen Grasshoppers	60
ZZ Leiden	87
16–25 January
Den Helder Suns	69	47	116
Landstede	74	95	169
1 February
Racing Beverwijk	56
Donar	98

Semi-finals
6–13 March
ZZ Leiden	80	65	145
New Heroes	60	73	133
13–18 January
Donar	95	80	175
Landstede	51	77	128

Final
25 March
ZZ Leiden	71
Donar	87

== Fourth round ==
Walkover	Donar	20–0	BAL	Groningen
19:30 GMT+1
				Arena: MartiniPlaza

13 December 2017	Almere Pioneers	51–83	Landstede	Almere
20:00 GMT+1	Scoring by quarter: 16–21, 12–17, 11–17, 12–28
		Report		Arena: Topsportcentrum Almere

20 December 2017	BV Groningen	57–86	Aris Leeuwarden	Groningen
20:00 GMT+1	Scoring by quarter: 19–32, 11–20, 13–15, 14–19
		Report		Arena: Oude Alo

21 December 2017	ZZ Leiden	101–87	Forward Lease Rotterdam	Leiden
20:00 GMT+1	Scoring by quarter: 25-12, 29–24, 25–20, 22–31
	Pts: De Jong 27; Rebs: Love 9 Asts: Love 6	Report	Pts: Kanda 22; Rebs: Kanda, Setty 6 Asts: Kanda 9	Arena: Vijf Meihal

4 January 2018	BAL 2	65–90	Den Helder Suns	Weert
18:00 GMT+1	Scoring by quarter: 17–23, 17–16, 20–28, 11–23
		Report		Arena: Sporthal Boshoven

9 January 2018	Apollo Amsterdam	58–104	New Heroes Den Bosch	Amsterdam
20:00 GMT+1	Scoring by quarter: 10–36, 14–14, 13–25, 21–29
	Pts: Van Schaik 13; Rebs: Van Schaik 8 Asts: Markusse 3	Report	Pts: Miklusak 21; Rebs: Oudendag 11; Asts: Sherrill 6	Arena: Apollohal

== Quarter-finals ==
=== First leg ===
16 January 2018	Den Helder Suns	69–74	Landstede	Den Helder
19:30 GMT+1	Scoring by quarter: 20–21, 18–16, 21–22, 10–15
	Pts: Koopman 17; Rebs: Koopman, McConico 7 Asts: De Paula, Thran 3	Report	Pts: House 19; Rebs: House, Van Oostrum 7 Asts: three players 3	Arena: Sporthal Sportlaan

16 January 2018	New Heroes	85–58	Aris Leeuwarden	's-Hertogenbosch
20:00 GMT+1	Scoring by quarter: 24–19, 17–10, 28–10, 16–19
	Pts: Sherrill 19; Rebs: Oudendag 16; Asts: Marshall 11	Report	Pts: Van der List 17; Rebs: three players 6 Asts: Kumelis 5	Arena: Maaspoort Sports & Events

25 January 2018	Solar-systemen Grasshoppers	60–87	ZZ Leiden	Katwijk
20:00 GMT+1	Scoring by quarter: 11–26, 19–20, 12–19, 18–22
	Pts: Schelvis 13; Rebs: Van der Linden 5 Asts: Schelvis 4	Report	Pts: De Jong 17; Rebs: Olah 7 Asts: Love 6	Arena: Kleinduijn

1 February 2018	Racing Beverwijk	56–98	Donar	Beverwijk
19:30 GMT+1
		Report

=== Second leg ===
25 January 2018	Landstede	95–47	Den Helder Suns	Zwolle
19:30 GMT+1	Scoring by quarter: 22–6, 27–15, 22–14, 24–12
	Pts: Gregory 25; Rebs: Dahlman 8 Asts: Van Oostrum 6		Pts: Van der Vuurst de Vries 16; Rebs: Dahlman 8 Asts: 2 players 2	Arena: Landstede Sportcentrum

31 January 2018	Aris Leeuwarden	49–84	New Heroes	Leeuwarden
20:00 GMT+1	Scoring by quarter: 14–21, 8–21, 13–25, 14–17
	Pts: Kratch 14; Rebs: van der List 13; Asts: Mladenovic 3	Report	Pts: Miklusak 25; Rebs: Oudendag 13; Asts: Sherrill 5	Arena: Kalverdijkje

== Semi-finals ==
=== First leg ===
13 February 2018	Donar	95–51	Landstede	Groningen
19:30 GMT+1	Scoring by quarter: 26-13, 27–9, 15–20, 27–9
	Pts: Curry 21; Rebs: Curry 9 Asts: Koenis 4	Report	Pts: Dahlman 15; Rebs: Van Oostrum 6 Asts: five players 1	Arena: MartiniPlaza

6 March 2018	ZZ Leiden	80–60	New Heroes	Leiden
20:00 GMT+1	Scoring by quarter: 16–12, 11–25, 19–14, 34–9
	Pts: Vette 31; Rebs: Kherazi 8 Asts: Love 12	Report	Pts: Sherrill 20; Rebs: Wessels 15; Asts: Sherrill 6	Arena: Vijf Meihal

=== Second leg ===
18 February 2018	Landstede	77–80	Donar	Zwolle
20:00 GMT+1	Scoring by quarter: 23–20, 10–12, 20–30, 24–18
	Pts: Gregory 29; Rebs: House 6 Asts: Dorsey-Walker 4	Report	Pts: Curry 17; Rebs: Bruinsma 8 Asts: Curry 4	Arena: Landstede Sportcentrum

17 March 2018	New Heroes	73–65	ZZ Leiden	's-Hertogenbosch
20:00 GMT+1	Scoring by quarter: 26–23, 16–10, 21–17, 10–15
	Pts: Sherill 31; Rebs: Oudendag 7 Asts: Bouwknecht 5	Report	Pts: Love 17; Rebs: Love 5 Asts: Love 5	Arena: Maaspoort

== Final ==
25 March 2018	Donar	87–61	ZZ Leiden	Groningen
14:00 GMT+1	Scoring by quarter: 38–21, 16–13, 20–17, 13–20
	Pts: Curry 26; Rebs: Koenis 18; Asts: Bruinsma 6	Report	Pts: Love 15; Rebs: Kherrazi 6 Asts: Love, Voorn 4	Arena: MartiniPlaza

== See also ==
- 2017–18 Dutch Basketball League
