= Rienk Mast =

Dutch basketball player (born 2001)

No. 51 – Noblesville Boom
- Position: Center
- League: NBA G League

Personal information
- Born: 19 July 2001 (age 25) Groningen, Netherlands
- Listed height: 6 ft 9 in (2.06 m)
- Listed weight: 248 lb (112 kg)

Career information
- College: Bradley (2020–2023); Nebraska (2023–2026)
- NBA draft: 2026: undrafted
- Playing career: 2017–present

Career history
- 2017–2019: Donar
- 2026–present: Noblesville Boom

Career highlights
- DBL champion (2018); Dutch Cup champion (2018); DBL Most Improved Player (2019); DBL MVP Under 23 (2019); DBL All-Rookie Team (2018); Third-team All-Big Ten – Coaches (2024); Third-team All-MVC (2022); MVC All-Freshman Team (2021); College Basketball Crown champion (2025)
- Stats at NBA.com
- Stats at Basketball Reference
Medals
Men's basketball
Representing the Netherlands
FIBA Europe U16 Championship Division B
Silver medal – second place	2017	National team
FIBA Europe U18 Championship Division B
Gold medal – first place	2018	National team

Rienk Johannes Mast (born 19 July 2001) is a Dutch professional basketball player for the Noblesville Boom of the NBA G League. He played college basketball for the Bradley Braves and Nebraska Cornhuskers. Standing at 205 cm (6 ft 8 1/2 in), Mast usually plays the power forward or center position. He is a current member of the Dutch national basketball team.

== Early career ==
After playing korfball first as a kid, Mast switched to basketball for the club Celeritas-Donar from Groningen. After a couple of years, he changed teams to RTC Noord where he was coached by Marco van den Berg. As a youngster, Mast received offers for Real Madrid Baloncesto to play in their program.

== Professional and college career ==
=== Donar ===
==== 2017–18: Rookie season ====
Mast played his first professional seasons for Donar, as he was added to the roster for the 2017–18 season. When Mast played his first game, he was 16 years old. On 1 February 2018, Mast scored 24 points in a NBB Cup game against Racing Beverwijk, which made him the youngest top scorer for Donar in history. In the 2017–18 season, Mast started in 3 of the 29 games he played for Donar and averaged 3.6 points and 2.0 rebounds in the Dutch Basketball League. He played two games in the continental fourth-tier FIBA Europe Cup competition.

==== 2018–19: Breakthrough season ====
In the 2018–19 season, Mast had his breakthrough season. Because of personnel changes within Donar and American players leaving, Mast was given a place in the starting five from January. On 12 January, he scored a career-high 30 points in a 101–67 win against BAL Weert. In April 2019, he was awarded the DBL MVP Under 23 award, as well as the DBL Most Improved Player award.

=== Bradley ===
On 21 January 2019, it was announced that Mast committed to Bradley University to play for the Braves. He redshirted his freshman season. As a redshirt freshman, Mast averaged 8.6 points and 5.9 rebounds per game. He was named to the Third-team All-Missouri Valley Conference as a sophomore.

=== Nebraska ===
In April 2023, after four years at Bradley, Mast announced that he would be transferring to Nebraska, where he would have two years of eligibility remaining. He explained his move by stating that "Bradley is a great basketball spot, [...] but you get to play against high majors 4-5 times a season. I want to see how I match up and play under bright lights every night. I want to see how I stack up against the best competition in college." After playing one year with Nebraska, Mast sat out the entirety of the Nebraska's 2024–25 season due to an injury on his left knee that required surgery; he obtained a medical redshirt and was confirmed to be returning to Nebraska the following season.

=== Indiana Pacers ===
On June 25, 2026, after going undrafted in the 2026 NBA draft, Mast signed with the Indiana Pacers on an Exhibit 10 contract. He played 4 games for the team in the 2026 NBA Summer League, averaging 15.3 points, 9.0 rebounds, and 1.8 assists per game.

== International career ==
=== Youth teams ===
In 2017, Mast played for the under-16 and the under-18 Netherlands national basketball team. He played at the 2017 FIBA Europe Under-16 Championship Division B, where he reached the final and made the tournament All-Star Team. Mast averaged 11.9 points, 10.1 rebounds and 1.4 assists per game.

In 2018, Mast won the 2018 FIBA Europe Under-18 Championship Division B while being the captain of the Dutch under-18 team. On January 21, he committed to play for the Bradley Braves in NCAA.

=== Senior team ===
On November 16, 2018, Mast was selected by head coach Toon van Helfteren to be a part of the Netherlands senior team for the first time. On November 29, 2018, Mast made his debut for the Netherlands in a 78–105 loss to Poland.

== Honors ==
=== Club ===
- Dutch Basketball League (1):

2017–18

- Dutch Cup (1):

2017–18

=== Individual awards ===
- DBL MVP Under 23: 2019
- DBL Most Improved Player: 2019
- DBL All-Rookie Team: 2018
- 2017 FIBA Europe Under-16 Championship Division B All-Star Team: 2017

== Career statistics ==
Legend
GP	Games played	GS	Games started	MPG	Minutes per game
FG%	Field goal percentage	3P%	3-point field goal percentage	FT%	Free throw percentage
RPG	Rebounds per game	APG	Assists per game	SPG	Steals per game
BPG	Blocks per game	PPG	Points per game	**Bold**	Career high

=== College ===
Year	Team	GP	GS	MPG	FG%	3P%	FT%	RPG	APG	SPG	BPG	PPG
2019–20	Bradley	Redshirt										
2020–21	Bradley	28	19	23.5	.484	**.359**	.724	5.9	1.3	.3	.5	8.6
2021–22	Bradley	31	31	27.5	.476	.284	.695	**8.4**	1.4	.5	**.9**	11.6
2022–23	Bradley	29	29	28.7	**.518**	.353	.736	8.0	2.4	**.6**	.5	**13.8**
2023–24	Nebraska	32	32	**29.8**	.433	.344	**.838**	7.5	3.0	.4	.5	12.3
2025–26	Nebraska	**34**	**34**	29.2	.442	.311	.823	5.8	**3.1**	.4	.3	13.3
Career		154	145	27.9	.467	.327	.767	7.1	2.3	.5	.5	12.0
