= Yarick Brussen =

Dutch basketball player (born 2000)

Free Agent
- Position: Center

Personal information
- Born: 2 February 2000 (age 26) Arnhem, Netherlands
- Listed height: 2.08 m (6 ft 10 in)

Career information
- Playing career: 2016–present

Career history
- 2016–2017: Heroes Den Bosch
- 2017–2018: BAL
- 2018–2022: Den Helder Suns
- 2022–2024: Kortrijk Spurs

Career highlights
- BNXT League rebounding leader (2022)

Yarick Brussen (born 2 February 2000) is a Dutch basketball player who last played for the Kortrijk Spurs. Standing at 2.08 m (6 ft 10 in), he plays as center.

Brussen has played for several youth teams in the Netherlands before making his professional debut with Heroes Den Bosch. After one season with BAL, he joined the Den Helder Suns in 2018. He played with the Netherlands national under-16 and under-18 team.

== Professional career ==
Born in Arnhem, Brussen played for the youth program of Arnhem Eagles, TBG Dragons and later Den Bosch. He made his professional debut on October 8, 2016, playing six minutes for Den Bosch (then called Shooters Den Bosch) in a 52–73 home loss to Donar.

Brussen signed with BAL for the 2017–18 season, finding a permanent place on a DBL roster at age 17.

In 2018, Brussen signed with the Den Helder Suns. After a marginal role in his first season, he broke out in the second season with the Suns, as he averaged 13.1 and a team-high 8.5 rebounds. On November 28, 2019, Brussen recorded a career-high 19 rebounds, to go along with 16 points, in a 72–79 home loss to Feyenoord. On January 30, 2021, Brussen scored a career-high 25 points along with 15 rebounds in a 84–98 away win over Almere Sailors.

In June 2022, Brussen signed for the Kortrijk Spurs of the Belgian second-level Top Division 1.
