= DBL Most Improved Player =

The Dutch Basketball League Most Improved Player is an award that is yearly given to the most improved player in the DBL, the highest professional basketball league in the Netherlands. The award is handed out after the regular season. The award is handed out by the FEB (Federatie Eredivisie Basketbal).

== Winners ==
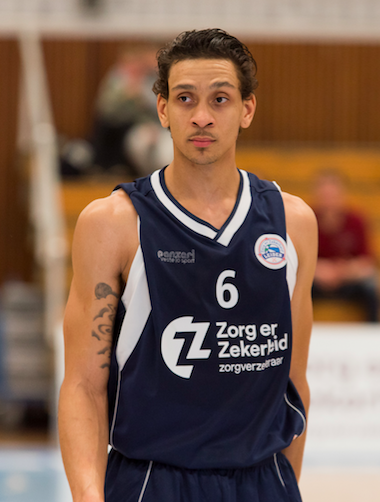
Worthy de Jong won the inaugural award in 2011.

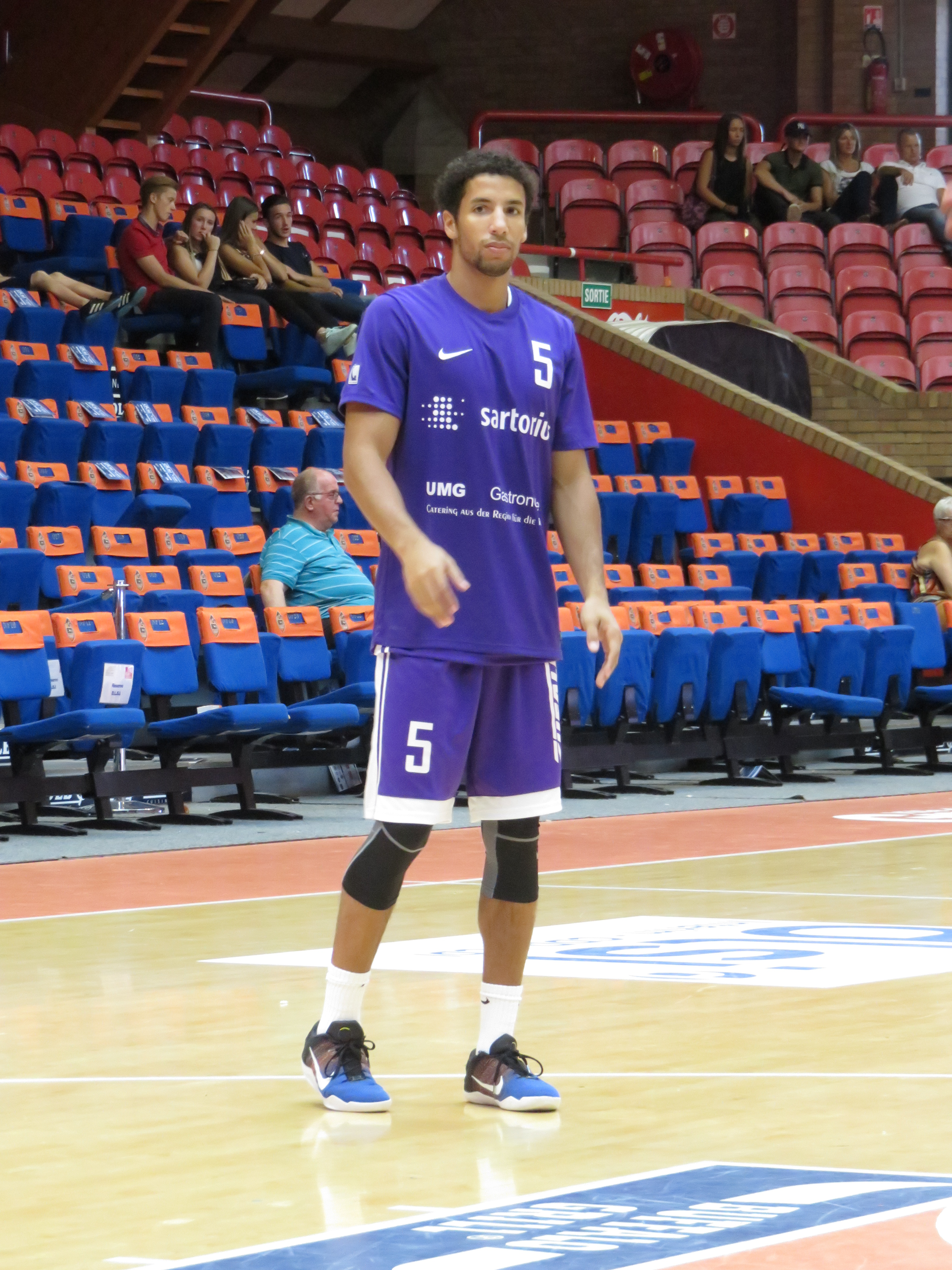
Leon Williams was named Most Improved Player in 2012.

Key
Player (X)	Name of the player and number of times they had won the award at that point (if more than one)
Nationality	Nationality as registered by FIBA, player may hold more nationalities
†	Indicates multiple award winners in the same season
‡	Denotes the club were DBL champions in the same season

Season	Player	Position	Nationality	Team	Ref
2010–11	Worthy de Jong	Guard	Netherlands	ZZ Leiden^{‡}	
2011–12	Leon Williams	Guard	Netherlands	Rotterdam Basketbal College	
2012–13	Jeroen van der List	Forward/center	Netherlands	Den Helder Kings	
2013–14	Jeroen van der List (2)	Forward/center	Netherlands	Den Helder Kings	
2014–15	Yannick Franke	Guard	Netherlands	Challenge Sports Rotterdam	
2015–16	Grant Gibbs	Guard	United States	Landstede	
2016–17	Maarten Bouwknecht	Guard	Netherlands	New Heroes Den Bosch	
2017–18	Sam van Dijk	Guard	Netherlands	BAL	
2018–19	Rienk Mast	Forward/center	Netherlands	Donar	
2020–21	Stan van den Elzen	Guard	Netherlands	Den Helder Suns	

== Awards won by nationality ==
Country	Total
Netherlands	9
United States	1

== Awards won by club ==
Country	Total
Den Helder Kings / Den Helder Suns	3
Rotterdam	2
ZZ Leiden	1
Den Bosch	1
Landstede Zwolle	1
BAL	1
Donar	1
