= Sam van Dijk =

Dutch basketball player

Personal information
- Born: 28 August 1996 (age 30)
- Listed height: 1.94 m (6 ft 4 in)

Career information
- Playing career: 2016–present
- Position: Guard

Career history
- 2016–2017: Rotterdam
- 2017–2018: BAL
- 2018–2019: Feyenoord
- 2020-2026: Deloitte
- 2026-present: Achmea

Career highlights
- DBL Most Improved Player (2018); DBL All-Rookie Team (2017)

Sam van Dijk (Dutch pronunciation: [ˈsɑɱ vɑn ˈdɛik]; born 28 August 1996) is a Dutch professional basketball player.

== Early career ==
Van Dijk played for DAS Delft and Lokomotief Rijswijk. In the 2015–16 season, he played for the Rotterdam Basketbal under-24 and Punch Delft.

== Professional career ==
Van Dijk played his debut season as a professional player in the 2016–17 season, as he made his debut with Forward Lease Rotterdam. After appearing in 20 games, he was named to the DBL All-Rookie Team after the season.

In September 2017, Van Dijk transferred to Basketball Academie Limburg, shortly BAL, for the 2017–18 season. In April 2018, van Dijk was awarded the DBL Most Improved Player honor, after averaging 12 points per game over the season and 21.1 points over his last seven games of the season.

For the 2018–19 season, Van Dijk returned to his old club Rotterdam which was now named Feyenoord.

In August 2020, Van Dijk signed as the first player ever for newly established The Hague Royals. He left the team during the preseason.

In September 2020, Van Dijk signed a contract as a financial auditor with Deloitte Netherlands. In June 2026, he left Deloitte to join Achmea Mortgages.
