= 2024–25 BNXT League =

- League: BNXT League
- Sport: Basketball
- Duration: 13 September 2024–10 May 2025 (Regular Season); 13 May–7 June 2025 (Playoffs)
- Teams: 19

Regular season
- Season MVP: (United States) Timmy Allen (Oostende)
- Top scorer: (United States) TreVion Crews (Helder Suns)

National playoffs
- Belgian champions: Oostende (26th title)
- Belgian runners-up: Kangoeroes Basket Mechelen
- Dutch champions: Heroes Den Bosch (18th title)
- Dutch runners-up: ZZ Leiden

Finals
- Champions: Kangoeroes Basket Mechelen (1st title)
- Runners-up: House of Talents Spurs Kortrijk

BNXT seasons
- ← 2023–24 2025–26 →

The 2024–25 BNXT League is the fourth season of the BNXT League, the highest professional basketball league in Belgium and the Netherlands. The season began on 14 September 2024 and will finish with the playoffs in 2025.

The format for this season was changed, as teams from both countries will now play each other home and away in one round-robin regular season. Teams qualify for their national playoffs based on rankings, and the champions of each country will play each other in the BNXT finals. Additionally, relegation was entered for this season as the last-ranked team will be relegated.

== Competition formula ==
Round	Teams entering in this round
Regular season (19 teams)	10 Belgian teams; 9 Dutch teams; All teams play each other home and away; Bottom team relegated; The team that finishes the Regular Season at the top of the standings is crowned as the BNXT League champion.
National play-offs (14 teams)	Best 6 Dutch teams; Top two Dutch teams go directly to semifinals; Four other Dutch teams play in quarterfinals; Best 8 Belgian teams; All Belgian teams play in quarterfinals

== Teams ==
Liège Basket withdrew from the league following the departure of their major investor, and later was disestalblished, ending a 24-year tenure in the highest Belgian basketball league.

=== Arenas and locations ===
Location of teams in the BNXT League

Note: Table lists in alphabetical order.

Club	Location	Venue	Capacity
Netherlands
BAL	Weert	Sporthal Boshoven	1,000
Den Helder Suns	Den Helder	Sporthal Quelderduijn	1,250
Donar	Groningen	MartiniPlaza	4,350
Feyenoord	Rotterdam	Topsportcentrum Rotterdam	2,500
Heroes Den Bosch	's-Hertogenbosch	Maaspoort	2,800
Landstede Hammers	Zwolle	Landstede Sportcentrum	1,200
LWD Basket	Leeuwarden	Kalverdijkje	1,700
QSTA United	Bemmel	De Kooi	650
ZZ Leiden	Leiden	Vijf Meihal	2,000
Belgium
Antwerp Giants	Antwerp	Lotto Arena	5,218
Brussels Basketball	Brussels	Sports Complex Neder-Over-Heembeek	1,200
Kangoeroes Mechelen	Mechelen	Winketkaai	1,500
Kortrijk Spurs	Kortrijk	Sportcampus Lange Munte	2,400
Leuven Bears	Leuven	Sportoase	3,400
Limburg United	Hasselt	Alverberg Sporthal	1,730
Mons-Hainaut	Mons	Mons Arena	4,000
Okapi Aalst	Aalst	Okapi Forum	2,800
Oostende	Ostend	Coretec Dôme	5,000
Spirou	Charleroi	Spiroudome	6,200

== Regular season ==
=== Standings ===
Pos	Team	Pld	W	L	PF	PA	PD	PCT	Qualification or relegation
1	(Belgium) Kangoeroes Basket Mechelen (C)	36	26	10	2936	2707	+229	.722	Advance to National Playoffs (BE)
2	(Belgium) House of Talents Spurs Kortrijk	36	26	10	3348	2792	+556	.722	Advance to National Playoffs (BE)
3	(Belgium) Filou Oostende	36	26	10	3099	2712	+387	.722	Advance to National Playoffs (BE)
4	(Belgium) Hubo Limburg United	36	25	11	2924	2727	+197	.694	Advance to National Playoffs (BE)
5	(Belgium) Brussels Basketball	36	25	11	2827	2706	+121	.694	Advance to National Playoffs (BE)
6	(Belgium) Windrose Giants Antwerp	36	23	13	3028	2915	+113	.639	Advance to National Playoffs (BE)
7	(Belgium) Stella Artois Leuven Bears	36	22	14	2884	2645	+239	.611	Advance to National Playoffs (BE)
8	(Netherlands) Heroes Den Bosch	36	21	15	3004	2877	+127	.583	Advance to National Playoffs (NL)
9	(Belgium) Union Mons-Hainaut	36	20	16	2891	2823	+68	.556	Advance to National Playoffs (BE)
10	(Netherlands) LWD Basket	36	20	16	2971	2998	−27	.556	Advance to National Playoffs (NL)
11	(Belgium) Spirou Basket	36	19	17	2862	2701	+161	.528	
12	(Netherlands) ZZ Leiden	36	17	19	2750	2879	−129	.472	Advance to National Playoffs (NL)
13	(Belgium) Okapi Aalst	36	16	20	2889	2904	−15	.444	
14	(Netherlands) Donar Groningen	36	13	23	2785	2992	−207	.361	Advance to National Playoffs (NL)
15	(Netherlands) Den Helder Suns	36	12	24	2630	2989	−359	.333	Advance to National Playoffs (NL)
16	(Netherlands) Landstede Hammers	36	12	24	2932	3076	−144	.333	Advance to National Playoffs (NL)
17	(Netherlands) Zeeuw & Zeeuw Feyenoord Basketball	36	9	27	2799	3143	−344	.250	
18	(Netherlands) PrismaWorx BAL	36	6	30	2527	3057	−530	.167	
19	(Netherlands) QSTA United (R)	36	4	32	2747	3190	−443	.111	

Source: BNXT League
(C) Champions; (R) Relegated

=== Results ===
Home \ Away	(Belgium) BRU	(Netherlands) DHE	(Netherlands) DON	(Netherlands) HDB	(Belgium) OOS	(Belgium) SPU	(Belgium) LIM	(Belgium) MEC	(Netherlands) LAN	(Netherlands) ARI	(Belgium) OKA	(Netherlands) BAL	(Netherlands) YOA	(Belgium) SPI	(Belgium) LEU	(Belgium) MON	(Belgium) ANT	(Netherlands) FEY	(Netherlands) ZZL
(Belgium) Brussels Basketball	—	97–72	77–68	74–73	72–82	84–77	73–72	74–87	80–78	66–82	90–98	79–61	102–67	59–71	78–76	67–80	67–65	73–61	80–50
(Netherlands) Den Helder Suns	73–93	—	79–68	81–93	73–82	78–88	77–69	48–75	91–79	67–86	64–96	65–68	81–67	61–68	65–91	71–68	68–99	81–60	79–80
(Netherlands) Donar Groningen	71–73	73–78	—	98–102	78–112	70–99	80–92	75–85	104–78	71–72	91–84	72–62	76–72	69–65	82–76	79–92	88–82	95–62	65–74
(Netherlands) Heroes Den Bosch	76–81	83–56	96–59	—	78–89	80–87	85–57	95–84	96–94	97–99	80–61	84–80	78–79	87–79	82–76	89–70	91–84	81–92	
(Belgium) Filou Oostende	70–76	94–83	95–68	96–84	—	86–80	84–72	75–79	108–81	77–82	84–76	112–52	98–76	83–71	73–54	91–77	100–74	102–62	91–83
(Belgium) House of Talents Spurs Kortrijk	79–80	92–71	124–79	73–71	91–80	—	92–84	108–85	86–67	109–52	91–63	115–75	98–73	82–59	67–73	92–61	113–67	139–95	108–74
(Belgium) Hubo Limburg United	94–89	84–44	83–66	92–61	68–76	99–97	—	74–65	85–73	75–57	80–66	73–65	112–82	88–87	61–86	78–61	79–88	77–67	74–71
(Belgium) Kangoeroes Basket Mechelen	86–89	93–67	85–62	72–69	74–64	93–91	76–65	—	92–69	89–69	78–79	87–65	95–80	77–72	72–67	79–68	76–79	100–93	70–68
(Netherlands) Landstede Hammers	84–81	96–90	65–83	97–101	79–60	71–89	69–84	69–75	—	70–91	90–82	104–77	83–75	76–85	76–71	80–83	77–81	98–84	75–78
(Netherlands) LWD Basket	74–83	95–70	64–73	80–92	86–92	105–80	89–98	89–85	100–89	—	99–88	79–73	100–76	85–101	97–81	86–77	90–76	93–107	92–95
(Belgium) Okapi Aalst	68–82	110–62	93–91	93–61	90–82	84–83	76–80	65–79	80–87	64–82	—	100–78	103–90	72–89	51–64	93–80	82–85	87–90	80–71
(Netherlands) PrismaWorx BAL	67–61	80–74	71–92	51–72	64–97	58–93	78–90	70–77	80–89	94–85	61–66	—	80–101	76–79	58–92	66–94	61–88	67–79	65–88
(Netherlands) QSTA United	77–85	100–105	74–77	68–84	61–102	64–93	85–107	70–82	73–106	66–82	74–80	77–85	—	77–87	55–86	111–113	70–85	85–65	71–76
(Belgium) Spirou Basket	79–83	77–83	80–68	78–85	77–80	92–75	85–73	89–75	71–67	62–74	72–81	78–89	78–60	—	69–72	60–50	94–87	106–60	98–62
(Belgium) Stella Artois Leuven Bears	86–72	91–67	75–73	80–91	77–91	74–86	85–68	90–93	104–77	85–48	90–75	74–57	90–85	73–69	—	60–70	87–76	76–72	98–63
(Belgium) Union Mons-Hainaut	83–86	91–77	91–89	78–84	78–69	82–91	78–83	81–61	90–85	101–72	76–69	88–71	87–85	88–76	85–71	—	79–73	96–71	71–77
(Belgium) Windrose Giants Antwerp	89–76	64–75	113–71	98–79	74–72	101–100	69–73	84–79	104–93	88–78	95–87	88–73	82–76	72–94	78–83	75–70	—	95–76	81–69
(Netherlands) Zeeuw & Zeeuw Feyenoord Basketball	63–74	73–79	88–80	73–94	75–76	78–94	79–94	66–95	75–67	98–69	74–80	80–68	76–77	102–92	85–93	71–84	87–90	—	74–94
(Netherlands) ZZ Leiden	66–71	66–75	79–81	95–81	87–74	84–86	66–86	69–81	87–94	83–88	79–67	85–81	71–68	50–73	78–77	85–70	82–99	92–86	—

Source: BNXT League
Legend: Blue = home team win; Red = away team win.
Matches with lighter background shading were decided after overtime.

== National Playoffs ==
In the national playoffs, quarterfinals will be played best-of-three format (1–1–1), semifinals and finals will be played in a best-of-five format (1–1–1–1–1).

The best placed 8 Belgian teams was qualified for the Belgian national play-offs, the best placed 6 Dutch teams was qualified for the Dutch play-offs.

=== Belgium ===
==== Bracket ====
Quarterfinals
1	Kangoeroes Basket Mechelen	2
8	Union Mons-Hainaut	0
4	Hubo Limburg United	2
5	Brussels Basketball	0
2	House of Talents Spurs Kortrijk	2
7	Stella Artois Leuven Bears	1
3	Filou Oostende	2
6	Windrose Giants Antwerp	1

Semifinals
1	Kangoeroes Basket Mechelen	3
4	Hubo Limburg United	2
2	House of Talents Spurs Kortrijk	1
3	Filou Oostende	3

Finals
1	Kangoeroes Basket Mechelen	1
3	Filou Oostende	3

==== Quarterfinals ====
Team 1	Series	Team 2	Game 1	Game 2	Game 3
Kangoeroes Basket Mechelen (Belgium)	2–0	(Belgium) Union Mons-Hainaut	85–80	92–67	—
House of Talents Spurs Kortrijk (Belgium)	2–1	(Belgium) Stella Artois Leuven Bears	86–82	83–92	87–79
Filou Oostende (Belgium)	2–1	(Belgium) Windrose Giants Antwerp	100–81	90–92	76–73
Hubo Limburg United (Belgium)	2–0	(Belgium) Brussels Basketball	86–82	82–77	—

==== Semifinals ====
Team 1	Series	Team 2	Game 1	Game 2	Game 3	Game 4	Game 5
Kangoeroes Basket Mechelen (Belgium)	3–2	(Belgium) Hubo Limburg United	95–84	91–85	78–91	71–80	85–78
House of Talents Spurs Kortrijk (Belgium)	1–3	(Belgium) Filou Oostende	85–86	91–98	103–96	75–78	—

==== Finals ====
Team 1	Series	Team 2	Game 1	Game 2	Game 3	Game 4	Game 5
Kangoeroes Basket Mechelen (Belgium)	1–3	(Belgium) Filou Oostende	77–76	49–96	70–93	76–100	—

=== Dutch ===
==== Bracket ====
Quarterfinals
4	Donar Groningen	2
5	Den Helder Suns	0
3	ZZ Leiden	2
6	Landstede Hammers	0

Semifinals
1	Heroes Den Bosch	3
4	Donar Groningen	0
2	LWD Basket	2
3	ZZ Leiden	3

Finals
1	Heroes Den Bosch	3
3	ZZ Leiden	0

==== Quarterfinals ====
Team 1	Series	Team 2	Game 1	Game 2	Game 3
ZZ Leiden (Netherlands)	2–0	(Netherlands) Landstede Hammers	103–71	83–81	—
Donar Groningen (Netherlands)	2–0	(Netherlands) Den Helder Suns	85–75	78–72	—

==== Semifinals ====
Team 1	Series	Team 2	Game 1	Game 2	Game 3	Game 4	Game 5
Heroes Den Bosch (Netherlands)	3–0	(Netherlands) Donar Groningen	105–72	96–72	96–68	—	—
LWD Basket (Netherlands)	2–3	(Netherlands) ZZ Leiden	80–90	67–89	89–81	84–82	85–90

==== Finals ====
Team 1	Series	Team 2	Game 1	Game 2	Game 3	Game 4	Game 5
Heroes Den Bosch (Netherlands)	3–0	(Netherlands) ZZ Leiden	85–72	90–63	86–67	—	—

== Individual awards ==
=== Monthly awards ===
Month	Player of the Month		Young player of the Month		Ref.
Month	Player	Club	Player	Club	Ref.
October	(Belgium) Niels Van Den Eynde	Okapi Aalst	(Belgium) Noah Meeusen	Filou Oostende	
November	(United States) Brian Cameron	Feyenoord Basketball	(Belgium) Siebe Ledegen	Okapi Aalst	
December	(United States) Chase Audige	Filou Oostende	(Belgium) Quinten Smout	Spirou Basket	
January	(Bosnia and Herzegovina) Njegoš Sikiraš	Okapi Aalst	(Belgium) Oskar Giltay	Hubo Limburg United	
February	(United States) Trevion Crews	Den Helder Suns	(Belgium) Jo Van Buggenhout	Hubo Limburg United	
March	(United States) Michael Flowers	Windrose Giants Antwerp	(Belgium) Sean Pouedet	House of Talents Spurs Kortrijk	

=== BNXT Awards ===
The winner of individual awards was announced on May 11, 2025.

Category	Player	Team	Nominees	Ref.
Most Valuable Player (MVP)	(United States) Timmy Allen	(Belgium) Filou Oostende	(Belgium) Niels De Ridder (Kortrijk Spurs) (United States) Timmy Allen (Filou Oostende) (United States) Trenton Gibson (Mechelen)	
Belgian Playoff Finals MVP	(United States) Timmy Allen	(Belgium) Filou Oostende	–	
Dutch Playoff Finals MVP	(United States) Le'Tre Darthard	(Netherlands) Heroes Den Bosch	–	
Dream Team (First Team)	(United States) Trenton Gibson	(Belgium) Kangoeroes Basket Mechelen	–	
Dream Team (First Team)	(United States) Eric Reed Jr.	(Belgium) House of Talents Spurs	–	
Dream Team (First Team)	(United States) Timmy Allen	(Belgium) Filou Oostende	–	
Dream Team (First Team)	(United States) Aundre Hyatt	(Belgium) Kangoeroes Basket Mechelen	–	
Dream Team (First Team)	(Belgium) Niels De Ridder	(Belgium) House of Talents Spurs	–	
Dream Team (Second Team)	(United States) TreVion Crews	(Netherlands) Den Helder Suns	–	
Dream Team (Second Team)	(United States) Michael Flowers	(Belgium) Windrose Giants Antwerp	–	
Dream Team (Second Team)	(United States) Samuell Williamson	(Netherlands) Heroes Den Bosch	–	
Dream Team (Second Team)	(Czech Republic) James Karnik	(Netherlands) Donar Groningen	–	
Dream Team (Second Team)	(Netherlands) Shaquille Doorson	(Netherlands) LWD Basket	–	
Dutch Player of the Year	(Netherlands) Shaquille Doorson	(Netherlands) LWD Basket	(Netherlands) Shaquille Doorson (LWD Basket) (Netherlands) Kai Edwards (Landstede Hammers) (Netherlands) Charlon Kloof (Heroes Den Bosch)	
Belgian Player of the Year	(Belgium) Niels De Ridder	(Belgium) House of Talents Spurs	(Belgium) Quentin Serron (Limburg United) (Belgium) Niels Van Den Eynde (Okapi Aalst) (Belgium) Niels De Ridder (Kortrijk Spurs)	
Rising Star of the Year (Netherlands)	(Netherlands) Matthijs Verhallen	(Netherlands) Den Helder Suns	(Netherlands) Matthijs Verhallen (Helder Suns) (Netherlands) Tjall de Vaal (United Basketball) (Netherlands) Florian Rijkers (United Basketball)	
Rising Star of the Year (Belgium)	(Belgium) Noah Meeusen	(Belgium) Filou Oostende	(Belgium) Adedayo Polet (Spirou) (Belgium) Noah Meeusen (Filou Oostende) (Belgium) Oskar Giltay (Limburg United)	
Sixth Man of the Year	(Belgium) Bram Bogaerts	(Belgium) House of Talents Spurs	(Slovenia) Leon Stergar (Kortrijk Spurs) (United States) Joel Murray (LWD Basket) (Belgium) Bram Bogaerts (Kortrijk Spurs))	
Defensive Player of the Year	(Netherlands) Shaquille Doorson	(Netherlands) LWD Basket	(Belgium) Archange Bolavie (Limburg United) (Netherlands) Shaquille Doorson (LWD Basket) (Belgium) Quentin Serron (Limburg United)	
Coach of the Year	(Netherlands) Johan Roijakkers	(Belgium) House of Talents Spurs	(Belgium) Tony Van den Bosch (Kortrijk Spurs) (Netherlands) Vincent van Sliedregt (LWD Basket) (Netherlands) Johan Roijakkers (Kortrijk Spurs)	
Referee of the Year (Netherlands)	(Netherlands) Tijmen Last	–	(Netherlands) Tijmen Last (Netherlands) John Van Dam (Netherlands) Stan Kestein	
Referee of the Year (Belgium)	(Belgium) Renaud Geller	–	(Belgium) Chess Van Looy (Belgium) Nick Van den Broeck (Belgium) Renaud Geller	

== Statistics ==
The following were the statistical leaders in the 2024–25 regular season.

=== Individual statistic leaders ===
Category	Player	Team(s)	Statistic
Points per game	TreVion Crews	Den Helder Suns	20.9
Rebounds per game	Jean-David Muila-Mwaka	Den Helder Suns	11.8
Assists per game	Sean Pouedet	Kortrijk Spurs	7.0
Steals per game	Davion Mintz	Filou Oostende	2.0
Blocks per game	Shaquille Doorson	LWD Basket	2.0
Efficiency per game	James Karnik	Donar	23.3
FT%	Trevian Tennyson	Okapi Aalst	92.4%
2P%	Ja'Von Franklin	LWD Basket	71.1%
3P%	Le'Tre Darthard	ZZ Leiden	51.6%

== BNXT clubs in European competitions ==
Team	Competition	Progress
(Basketball Belgium) Filou Oostende	Champions League	Play-ins
(Basketball Nederland) Heroes Den Bosch	Champions League	Qualifying round
(Basketball Belgium) Spirou Charleroi	FIBA Europe Cup	Second round
(Basketball Belgium) Hubo Limburg United	FIBA Europe Cup	Regular season
(Basketball Belgium) Windrose Giants Antwerp	FIBA Europe Cup	Regular season

== BNXT clubs in Regional competitions ==
Team	Competition	Progress
(Basketball Nederland) Donar Groningen	European North Basketball League	Regular season

== See also ==
- 2024–25 Belgian Women's Basketball League
- 2024–25 Dutch Women's Basketball League
