= Emanuele Montaguti =

Italian basketball player

Free Agent
- Position: Point guard

Personal information
- Born: 21 October 1993 (age 33) Cesena, Italy
- Listed height: 178 cm (5 ft 10 in)
- Listed weight: 73 kg (161 lb)

Career information
- High school: Istituto Tecnico Agrario ITAS (Cesena, Italy)
- College: West Florida (2013–2016)
- Playing career: 2018–present

Career history
- 2018–2019: Feyenoord

Emanuele Montaguti (born 21 October 1993) is an Italian basketball player who last played for Feyenoord Basketbal of the Dutch Basketball League (DBL). Standing at 178 cm (5 ft 10 in), he plays as point guard. He played college basketball for the West Florida Argonauts, from 2013 until 2016.

== Professional career ==
On 6 October 2018, Montaguti made his professional debut with Feyenoord Basketball against New Heroes Den Bosch and scored 3 points on 1-1 shooting.
