= 2017–18 Dutch Basketball League =

Dutch Basketball League
- Season: 2017–18
- Dates: 7 October 2017 – 29 May 2018
- Games played: 163
- Teams: 9

Regular season
- Top seed: Donar
- Season MVP: Brandyn Curry

Finals
- Champions: Donar; 7th title
- Runners-up: ZZ Leiden
- Playoffs MVP: Brandyn Curry

Statistical leaders
Points	Ordane Kanda	18.8
Rebounds	Roel Aarts	8.1
Assists	Carrington Love	6.8

The 2017–18 Dutch Basketball League (DBL) was the 58th season of the Dutch Basketball League, the highest professional basketball league in the Netherlands. The regular season started on 7 October 2017 and ended 21 April 2018. Donar is the defending champion. The playoffs started on 1 May and ended 29 May 2018. Donar captured its seventh championship, its third in a row and fourth in fifth years, after defeating ZZ Leiden in the finals.

== Teams ==
Location of teams in the 2017–18 Dutch Basketball League

Den Helder Suns entered the DBL for this season, which meant the return of a teams from Den Helder since the departure of Kings three seasons ago. Starting from the 2017–18 season, BSW Weert was dissolved and replaced by BAL.

=== Arenas and locations ===
Club	Location	Venue	Capacity
Apollo Amsterdam	Amsterdam	Apollohal	1,500
Aris Leeuwarden	Leeuwarden	Kalverdijkje	1,700
BAL	Weert	Sporthal Boshoven	1,000
Den Helder Suns	Den Helder	Sporthal Sportlaan	1,000
Donar	Groningen	MartiniPlaza	4,350
Forward Lease Rotterdam	Rotterdam	Topsportcentrum	1,000
Landstede	Zwolle	Landstede Sportcentrum	1,200
New Heroes	's-Hertogenbosch	Maaspoort	2,800
Zorg en Zekerheid Leiden	Leiden	Vijf Meihal	2,000

=== Personnel and sponsorship ===
Team	Head coach	Captain	Kit manufacturer	Shirt sponsor
Apollo Amsterdam	(Netherlands) Patrick Faijdherbe	(Netherlands) Dimeo van der Horst	Adidas	
Aris Leeuwarden	(Belgium) Tony van den Bosch	(Netherlands) Stefan Mladenovic	Jako	Friezon
BAL	(Serbia) Radenko Varagic		Spalding	
Den Helder Suns	(Netherlands) Peter van Noord	(Netherlands) Tjoe de Paula	Burned	Envinity
Donar	(Netherlands) Erik Braal	(Netherlands) Jason Dourisseau	Burned	Hepro
Forward Lease Rotterdam	(Netherlands) Armand Salomon	(Netherlands) Ties Theeuwkens	Peak	Forward Lease
Landstede	(Netherlands) Herman van den Belt	(Netherlands) Nigel Van Oostrum	Burned	Landstede
New Heroes	(Croatia) Silvano Poropat	(Netherlands) Stefan Wessels	Burned	New Heroes
ZZ Leiden	(Belgium) Paul Vervaeck	(Netherlands) Mohamed Kherrazi	Peak	Zorg en Zekerheid

=== Managerial changes ===
Team	Outgoing manager	Manner of departure	Date of vacancy	Position in table	Incoming manager	Date of appointment
New Heroes	(Netherlands) Sander van der Holst	Mutual consent	May 31, 2017	Pre-season	(Croatia) Silvano Poropat	May 31, 2017
Aris Leeuwarden	(Netherlands) Klaas Stoppels	End of contract	June 15, 2017	Pre-season	(Belgium) Tony van den Bosch	June 15, 2017

== Foreign players ==
For the 2017–18 season, league policy was changed and the number of allowed foreign players per team was increased from 4 to 5. Additional was the restriction that a team is not allowed to have five foreign players on the court at the same time.

Club	Player 1	Player 2	Player 3	Player 4	Player 5	Left during season
Apollo Amsterdam	(Belgium) Benjamin Janssens					(Syria) Micheal Madanly
Aris Leeuwarden	(United States) Emile Blackman	(United States) Nate Kratch	(Lithuania) Deividas Kumelis	(United States) David Michaels		(Canada) Meshack Lufile
BAL						
Den Helder Suns	(United States) LaVonte Dority	(Luxembourg) Alex Laurent	(United States) Quinterian McConico			
Donar	(Croatia) Drago Pašalić	(United States) Brandyn Curry	(United States) Bradford Burgess	(United States) Teddy Gipson	(United States) Evan Bruinsma	(United States) Stephen Domingo (Note: Stephen Domingo of Donar suffered a season-ending injury in January 2018, opening up space for Bradford Burgess.)
Forward Lease Rotterdam	(Belgium) Ordane Kanda-Kanyndia	(United States) Trevor Setty	(United States) Marcel Boyd	(Canada) Joey Puddister	(Syria) Micheal Madanly	(United States) Chris Commons
Landstede	(United States) Noah Dahlman	(United States) Jordan Gregory	(United States) Sherron Dorsey-Walker	(United States) Franko House		
New Heroes	(United States) Mike Miklusak	(United States) Keshun Sherrill	(British Virgin Islands) Norville Carey	(United States) Anthony Marshall		
ZZ Leiden	(Suriname) Sergio De Randamie	(United States) Clayton Vette	(United States) Carrington Love			

== Regular season ==
In the regular season, teams play against each other four times home-and-away in double a round-robin format. The six first qualified teams advance to the playoffs. The regular season started on 7 October 2017 and will end 21 April 2018.

=== Standings ===
Pos	Team	Pld	W	L	PF	PA	PD	Pts	Qualification
1	Donar	32	28	4	2686	2031	+655	56	Qualification to semifinals
2	Landstede	32	24	8	2556	2244	+312	48	Qualification to semifinals
3	ZZ Leiden	32	24	8	2598	2292	+306	48	Qualification to quarterfinals
4	New Heroes	32	24	8	2618	2289	+329	48	Qualification to quarterfinals
5	Forward Lease Rotterdam	32	15	17	2467	2636	−169	30	Qualification to quarterfinals
6	Aris Leeuwarden	32	10	22	2184	2448	−264	20	Qualification to quarterfinals
7	Apollo Amsterdam	32	9	23	2350	2583	−233	18	
8	Den Helder Suns	32	6	26	2164	2671	−507	12	
9	BAL	32	4	28	2212	2641	−429	8	

Source: DBL, Scoresway

=== Results ===
==== First round ====
Home \ Away	APO	ARI	BAL	DHE	DON	ROT	LAN	NEW	ZZL
Apollo Amsterdam	—	82–76	109–114	85–67	47–78	71–84	76–84	67–79	64–83
Aris Leeuwarden	79–73	—	73–76	84–82	20–0 (Note: Donar won the match on November 17, 2017, 56–84 over Aris Leeuwarden. However, the result was reverted because Donar had five foreign players playing on the court at the same time, violating the DBL's foreigner policy.)	69–80	61–81	48–99	64–66
BAL	54–79	80–96	—	76–82	67–93	65–79	88–91	63–81	73–76
Den Helder Suns	84–74	74–78	60–79	—	69–86	73–76	76–73	56–82	78–100
Donar	88–55	112–65	76–49	98–62	—	82–49	79–68	85–65	91–69
Forward Lease Rotterdam	80–82	83–74	79–62	95–77	68–106	—	92–89	81–91	77–76
Landstede	97–72	87–66	80–59	87–47	60–75	85–65	—	72–65	69–65
New Heroes	89–64	88–47	82–48	91–65	73–95	74–68	87–65	—	68–60
ZZ Leiden	82–69	77–55	101–78	87–49	75–63	92–74	74–64	83–81	—

Source: DBL
Legend: Blue = home team win; Red = away team win.
Matches with lighter background shading were decided after overtime.

==== Second round ====
Home \ Away	APO	ARI	BAL	DHE	DON	RDM	LAN	NEW	ZZL
Apollo Amsterdam	—	55–74	85–70	94–72	81–87	84–91	65–105	82–93	79–100
Aris Leeuwarden	70–68	—	82–67	85–80	46–70	72–75	73–85	82–90	72–81
BAL	55–80	54–79	—	80–87	66–79	93–81	57–67	61–88	46–75
Den Helder Suns	56–80	69–66	85–83	—	73–95	77–86	44–80	73–77	68–84
Donar	90–61	85–61	84–71	78–56	—	89–65	84–68	71–80	103–112
Forward Lease Rotterdam	65–67	79–63	77–69	72–55	66–95	—	74–92	80–89	92–94
Landstede	73–69	88–66	88–65	84–49	55–86	111–74	—	86–78	82–81
New Heroes	78–73	90–79	92–75	91–52	48–96	114–86	68–69	—	86–78
ZZ Leiden	87–60	72–59	74–70	89–66	61–85	102–74	64–71	79–61	—

Source: DBL
Legend: Blue = home team win; Red = away team win.
Matches with lighter background shading were decided after overtime.

== Play-offs ==
In the quarterfinals a best-of-three format is used, while in the semifinals and finals are played in a best-of-seven format. The play-offs start on 1 May and ended 29 May 2018.

=== Bracket ===
Quarterfinals
4 New Heroes	1
5 Rotterdam	2
3 ZZ Leiden	2
6 Aris Leeuwarden	1

Semifinals
1 Donar	4
5 Rotterdam	0
2 Landstede	0
3 ZZ Leiden	4

Finals
1 Donar	4
3 ZZ Leiden	0

=== Quarterfinals ===
The legs were played on 1 May, 3 May and (if necessary) on 5 May. The team with the higher seed played game one and three (if necessary) at home.

Team 1	Series	Team 2	Game 1	Game 2	Game 3
ZZ Leiden	2–1	Aris Leeuwarden	85–77	64–56	66–55
New Heroes	1–2	Forward Lease Rotterdam	99–64	97–93 (ot)	89–92

=== Semifinals ===
The legs were played on 8 May, 10 May, 12 May, 15 May and (if necessary) 17 May, 19 May and 20 May. The team with the higher seed played game one, three, five and seven (if necessary) at home.

Team 1	Series	Team 2	Game 1	Game 2	Game 3	Game 4	Game 5	Game 6	Game 7
Donar	4–0	Forward Lease Rotterdam	96–77	85–114	98–74	107–51			
Landstede	0–4	ZZ Leiden	79–81	74–78	73–78	60–63			

=== Finals ===
The legs were played on 22 May, 24 May, 26 May, 29 May and (if necessary) 31 May, 2 June and 3 June. The team with the higher seed played game one, three, five and seven (if necessary) at home.

Team 1	Series	Team 2	Game 1	Game 2	Game 3	Game 4	Game 5	Game 6	Game 7
Donar	4–0	ZZ Leiden	105–66	78–71	80–69	73–66			

== Final standings ==
Teams are ranked based on the playoff round in which they were eliminated and their regular season records.

Pos	Team	Pld	W	L	
1	Donar (C, O)	40	36	4	Qualification for Champions League qualifying rounds
2	ZZ Leiden	43	30	13	Qualification for FIBA Europe Cup qualifying rounds
3	Landstede	36	24	12	
4	Forward Lease Rotterdam	39	17	22	
5	New Heroes (Note: New Heroes qualified for the 2018–19 FIBA Europe Cup, after Landstede and Rotterdam denied the invitation.)	35	25	10	Qualification for FIBA Europe Cup qualifying rounds
6	Aris Leeuwarden	35	11	24	
7	Apollo Amsterdam	32	9	23	
8	Den Helder Suns	32	6	26	
9	BAL	32	4	28	

Source: DBL
(C) Champions; (O) Play-off winners

== Awards ==
Award	Player	Club
Most Valuable Player	Brandyn Curry	Donar
Play-offs MVP	Brandyn Curry	Donar
MVP Under-23	Boyd van der Vuurst de Vries	Den Helder Suns
Rookie of the Year	Boyd van der Vuurst de Vries	Den Helder Suns
Defensive Player of the Year	Sean Cunningham	Donar
All-Defense Team	Sean Cunningham	Donar
All-Defense Team	Carrington Love	ZZ Leiden
All-Defense Team	Mohamed Kherrazi	ZZ Leiden
All-Defense Team	Stefan Wessels	New Heroes
All-Defense Team	Thomas Koenis	Donar

== Statistics ==
=== Statistical leaders ===
Category	Player	Team	Average
Points	(Belgium) Ordane Kanda-Kanyinda	Forward Lease Rotterdam	18.8
Rebounds	(Netherlands) Roel Aarts	BAL	8.1
Assists	(United States) Carrington Love	ZZ Leiden	6.8
Steals	(Netherlands) Worthy de Jong	ZZ Leiden	3.0
Blocks	(Netherlands) Berend Weijs	Apollo Amsterdam	1.3
Turnovers	(Belgium) Ordane Kanda-Kanyinda	Forward Lease Rotterdam	3.8
2P%	(Netherlands) Stefan Wessels	New Heroes	.671
3P%	(United States) Brandyn Curry	Donar	.423
FT%	(United States) Brandyn Curry	Donar	.901

== In European competitions ==
Club	Competition	Performance	Record	Ref
Donar	Champions League	Third qualifying round	2–1–3	
Donar	FIBA Europe Cup	Semi-finals	12–6	

== See also ==
- 2017–18 NBB Cup
- 2017 Dutch Basketball Supercup
