= Carrington Love =

American basketball player

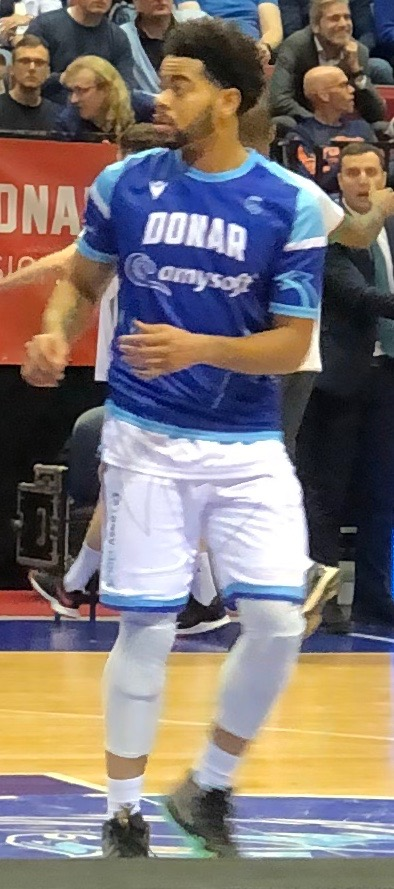
- Love with Donar in 2019

Free Agent
- Position: Point guard

Personal information
- Born: January 6, 1994 (age 32) Milwaukee, Wisconsin, U.S.
- Listed height: 186 cm (6 ft 1 in)
- Listed weight: 78 kg (172 lb)

Career information
- High school: Pius XI (Milwaukee, Wisconsin)
- College: Green Bay (2012–2016)
- NBA draft: 2016: undrafted
- Playing career: 2016–present

Career history
- 2016–2017: Kirchheim Knights
- 2017–2018: ZZ Leiden
- 2018–2019: Kangoeroes Mechelen
- 2019–2020: Donar
- 2020–2021: ZZ Leiden
- 2021–2022: Eisbären Bremerhaven
- 2023: Leicester Riders

Career highlights
- All-DBL Team (2018); DBL All-Defense Team (2018); DBL assists leader (2018); ProA assists leader (2017); First-team All-Horizon League (2016)

Carrington Love (born January 6, 1994) is an American professional basketball player who last played for British Basketball League (BBL) club Leicester Riders. Love played college basketball for Green Bay from 2012 until 2016.

== Professional career ==
On August 16, 2016, Love signed with Kirchheim Knights of the German second division ProA. Love reached the semi-finals of the promotion play-offs with Kirchheim, where the team was defeated 3–0 by top seeded Mitteldeutscher BC.

On July 27, 2017, Love was announced by ZZ Leiden of the Dutch Basketball League (DBL). On April 20, 2018, Love was named to the DBL All-Defense Team. On April 23, Love received a place in the All-DBL Team. He finished second in MVP voting, behind winner Brandyn Curry.

On June 19, 2018, Love was announced by Kangoeroes Basket Willebroek of the Belgian Pro Basketball League.

On July 14, 2019, Love returned to the Netherlands by signing a one-year contract with Donar. The 2019–20 season was cancelled prematurely in March because of the COVID-19 pandemic. Love returned to the United States.

On October 23, 2020, Love returned to ZZ Leiden where he replaced Desure Buie. On January 29, 2021, Love left the club for personal reasons.

For the 2021–22 season, Love signed with German club Eisbären Bremerhaven of the second-tier ProA.

== Honours and titles ==
=== Individual ===
- All-DBL Team: 2017–18
- DBL All-Defense Team: 2017–18
- DBL assists leader: 2017–18
- ProA assists leader: 2016–17
- First-team All-Horizon League: 2016
