= Jeroen van der List =

Dutch basketball player

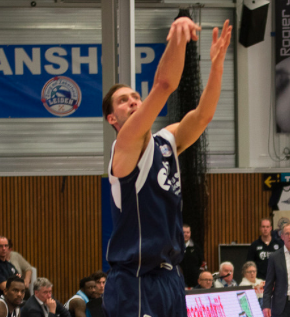
- Van der List with ZZ Leiden in 2016

BC Mažeikiai
- Position: Power forward / center

Personal information
- Born: 9 December 1989 (age 36) Gouda, Netherlands
- Listed height: 7 ft 0 in (2.13 m)

Career information
- High school: Stoneridge Prep (Simi Valley, California)
- College: Indian Hills CC (2008–2009)
- Playing career: 2009–present

Career history
- 2009–2012: EiffelTowers Den Bosch
- 2009–2010: →Aris Leeuwarden
- 2012–2014: Den Helder Kings
- 2014–2016: ZZ Leiden
- 2016: Tremblay Athlétique Club
- 2016–2017: Shinshu Brave Warriors
- 2017: BAL
- 2017–2018: Aris Leeuwarden
- 2018–2023: Feyenoord
- 2024: 3x3 team Utrecht
- Mažeikiai

Career highlights
- DBL champion (2012); 2× DBL Most Improved Player (2013, 2014); 3× DBL All-Star (2013–2015); 2× DBL All- Star Game MVP (2014, 2015)

Hieronymus "Jeroen" van der List (born 9 December 1989) is a Dutch professional basketball player. Standing at 7 ft 0 in (2.13 m), van der List usually plays as power forward.

== Career ==
=== Den Bosch and Aris (2009–2012) ===
Van der List started his professional basketball career with Aris Leeuwarden, he played on loan for the club. After one year in Leeuwarden, van der List returned to his club EiffelTowers Den Bosch. In his second season with Den Bosch, van der List won the national championship although he wasn't a big contributor with 4.5 points per game. In the 2011-12 season Van der List also won the Dutch Basketball League Dunk Contest.

=== Den Helder Kings (2012–2014) ===
In the summer of 2012, van der List left for Den Helder Kings, the club that was a newcomer in the Dutch Basketball League. With Den Helder, Van der List reached the quarterfinals of the play-offs after finishing 6th in the regular season standings. Van der List played 24.4 minutes per night and scored 11 points per game, which was one of the main reasons van der List was named the DBL Most Improved Player.

In 2013–14 Van der List won the All-Star Game MVP award. After the regular season he was named the DBL Most Improved Player once again.

=== Leiden (2014–2016) ===
On 3 July 2014, Van der List signed with Zorg en Zekerheid Leiden.

=== France (2016) ===
After the end of the 2015-16 season, Van der List left for Tremblay-en-France, of the French fourth division.

=== BAL (2017) ===
On 9 October 2017, van der List returned to the Netherlands by signing with DBL newcomer Basketball Academie Limburg (BAL). In 5 games for BAL, Van der List averaged 11.2 points and 8.6 rebounds in 25.8 minutes per game.

=== Aris Leeuwarden (2017–2018) ===
On 9 November 2017, Van der List transferred to Aris Leeuwarden where he replaced Canadian center Meshack Lufile.

=== Feyenoord (2018–2023) ===
On 27 August 2018, Feyenoord, previously named Rotterdam Basketbal, signed van der List for the 2018–19 season. He averaged 14.5 points per game in 16 games with Feyenoord.

On 28 August 2019, van der List extended his contract for the 2019–20 season. He averaged 11.8 points and 4.9 rebounds per game. On 16 July 2020, van der List extended his contract for another season.

== Honours ==
=== Club ===
EiffelTowers Den Bosch

- Dutch Basketball League: 2011–12

=== Individual ===
- DBL Most Improved Player (2): 2012–13, 2013–14
- DBL All-Star (3): 2013, 2014, 2015
- DBL All- Star Game MVP (2):, 2014, 2015
- DBL All-Star Dunk Champion (3): 2010, 2012, 2014
