= Den Helder Suns =

- Leagues: Promotiedivisie
- Founded: 2016; 10 years ago (Note: The Den Helder Suns is the successor of Den Helder Kings which went bankrupt in 2014 and while it is a new organisation, it can be seen as a phoenix club.)
- Arena: Sportcentrum Quelderduijn
- Capacity: 1,250
- Location: Den Helder, Netherlands
- Team colors: Blue, Black, White, Gold
- President: James Meijer
- Head coach: Atakan Yazıcı
- Retired numbers: 1 (5)
- Website: denheldersuns.nl
Home	Away

The Den Helder Suns are a professional basketball club based in Den Helder, Netherlands. The club was founded in 2016 and currently plays in the Promotiedivisie. The Suns play their home games in the Sportcentrum Quelderduijn, which has a capacity of 1,250 people.

== History ==
After the bankruptcy of the Netherlands' professional BV Den Helder team during the 2013–14 season, a professional basketball representative team from Den Helder was missing for three seasons. In 2016, the Suns organisation was founded with the goal of making a return to the Dutch Basketball League (DBL). On June 30, 2017, Den Helder Suns announced it would return to the highest level in the 2017–18 season. On July 14, 2017, the Suns announced "Peter van Noord head coach Den Helder Suns."

In its first DBL season, Suns finished in the eight place of the regular season, above last-placed BAL. Captain Tjoe de Paula, who played for different clubs from Den Helder before, got his number retired on 19 April 2018.

Since the 2021–22 season, the Suns play in the BNXT League, in which the national leagues of Belgium and the Netherlands have been merged.

For the 2025-26 season, the clubs application for a license in the BNXT League was initially rejected due to uncertainties to meet their financial obligations throughout the season. The club reapplied for a license and was received one a month after the initial rejection. The economic uncertainties for the club however persisted, leading the club to decide not to reapply for a license for the 2026-27 season. The club expected they were going to be unable to meet the requirement of a proper basketball floor and maintaining a salary for a general manager. They hope to participate in a new league of the NBB which would be ranked between the BNXT League and the Promotiedivisie.

== Season by season ==
Season	Tier	League	Pos.	NBB Cup
Den Helder Suns
2017–18	1	DBL	8th	Quarterfinals
2018–19	1	DBL	5th	Eightfinals
2019–20	1	DBL	7th (Note: The 2019–20 season was cancelled in March because of the COVID-19 pandemic.)	Semifinalist
2020–21	1	DBL	6th	First Round
2021–22	1	BNXT League	NL 10th	Quarterfinals
2021–22	1	BNXT League	BNXT 20th	Quarterfinals
2022–23	1	BNXT League	NL 9th	Withdrew
2022–23	1	BNXT League	BNXT 19th	Withdrew
2023–24	1	BNXT League	NL 10th	First Round
2023–24	1	BNXT League	BNXT 20th	First Round
2024–25	1	BNXT League	NL 5th	Quarterfinals
2024–25	1	BNXT League	BNXT 15th	Quarterfinals
2025–26	1	BNXT League	NL 5th	Semifinals
2025–26	1	BNXT League	BNXT 13th	Semifinals
2026–27	2	Promotiedivisie		First round

== Players ==
=== Retired numbers ===
On 19 April 2018, Suns retired its first number as Tjoe de Paula was honored, who played for BV Den Helder during the periods 2001–2003, 2004–2006, 2008–2009 and 2017–18.

Den Helder Suns retired numbers
No	Nat.	Player	Position	Tenure	Ceremony date
5	(Dominican Republic)	Tjoe de Paula	G	2017–2018	19 April 2018

=== Current roster ===
Den Helder Suns roster
Players
Coaches

Pos.	No.	Nat.	Name	Ht.	Age
PG	1	(United States)	Mesidor, Reggie	1.83 m (6 ft 0 in)	26 – 1 January 2000
G	3	(Netherlands)	Beens, Thijs	1.92 m (6 ft 4 in)	19 – 19 November 2006
F	7	(United States)	Gilmore, Carter	2.02 m (6 ft 8 in)	24 – 12 December 2001
C	10	(Netherlands)	Visser, Jonas	2.08 m (6 ft 10 in)	25 – 6 February 2001
SG	11	(Netherlands)	De Haas, Ezra	1.93 m (6 ft 4 in)	18 – 22 March 2008
PF	12	(Netherlands)	Post, Steven	2.08 m (6 ft 10 in)	24 – 11 February 2002
SG	22	(Greece)	Rantonits, Balsa	1.93 m (6 ft 4 in)	21 – 30 October 2004
G	33	(Netherlands)	Thran, Nick (C)	1.85 m (6 ft 1 in)	26 – 3 May 2000
F	42	(United States)	Stover, Drew	2.03 m (6 ft 8 in)	24 – 27 February 2002
F	77	(Netherlands)	Van der Heiden, Noah	1.95 m (6 ft 5 in)	27 – 15 August 1999

Head coach

- (Netherlands) Atakan Yazıcı

Team manager

- (Netherlands) Marco Starrenburg

Legend

- (C) Team captain
- (DP) Development player
- (I) Import player
- Injured

- Roster
Updated: June 13, 2026

Note: Flags indicate national team eligibility at FIBA-sanctioned events. Players may hold other non-FIBA nationalities not displayed.

=== Notable players ===
Note: Flags indicate national team eligibility at FIBA-sanctioned events. Players may hold other non-FIBA nationalities not displayed.

Criteria

To appear in this section a player must have either:

- Set a club record or won an individual award while at the club
- Played at least one official international match for their national team at any time
- Played at least one official NBA match at any time.

- (Dominican Republic) Tjoe de Paula
  (1 season: 2017–18)
- (Luxembourg) Alex Laurent
  (2 seasons: 2017–2019)
- (Netherlands) Leon Williams
  (1 season: 2019)
- (Netherlands) Boy van Vliet
  (1 season: 2018–19)

=== Individual awards ===
BNXT League Dutch Rising Star of the Year

- Matthijs Verhallen – 2025

DBL Rookie of the Year

- Boyd van der Vuurst de Vries – 2018
- Boy van Vliet – 2019

DBL MVP Under 23

- Boyd van der Vuurst de Vries – 2018

DBL Most Improved Player

- Stan van den Elzen – 2021

=== Top scorers by season ===
The following players were the leading scorers for Den Helder in each DBL season:

Season	Name	PPG
2017–18	(Netherlands) Tjoe de Paula	14.8
2018–19	(Netherlands) Boy van Vliet	14.4
2019–20	(Netherlands) Yarick Brussen	13.1
2020–21	(Netherlands) Boyd van der Vuurst de Vries	14.7
2021–22	(Luxembourg) Ben Kovac	16.3

== Head coaches ==
Period	Name	Honours
2017–2023	(Netherlands) Peter van Noord	
2023–2024	(Republic of Ireland) Daniel Nelson	
2024–2026	(Belgium) Paul Vervaeck	
2026–present	(Netherlands) Atakan Yazici	
