= Stephen Domingo =

Nigerian American basketball player

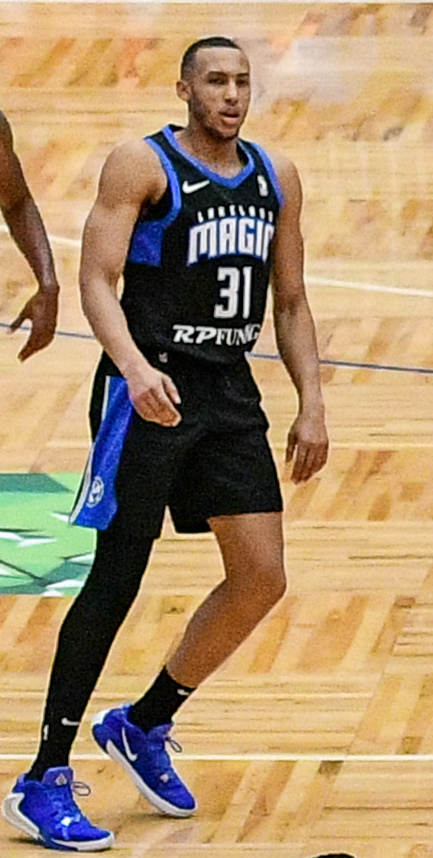
- Domingo with the Lakeland Magic in 2019

Free agent
- Position: Small forward

Personal information
- Born: May 9, 1995 (age 31) San Francisco, California
- Listed height: 6 ft 7 in (2.01 m)
- Listed weight: 215 lb (98 kg)

Career information
- High school: St. Ignatius College Preparatory (San Francisco, California)
- College: Georgetown (2012–2014); California (2015–2017)
- NBA draft: 2017: undrafted
- Playing career: 2017–present

Career history
- 2017–2018: Donar
- 2019–2021: Lakeland Magic
- 2021–2022: Fort Wayne Mad Ants
- 2023: Tindastóll
Medals
Men's basketball
Representing United States
U17 World Championship
Gold medal – first place	2012 Lithuania

Stephen George Adeniran Domingo (born May 9, 1995) is a Nigerian-American basketball player who last played for the Tindastóll of the Úrvalsdeild karla. He played college basketball for the Georgetown Hoyas and California Golden Bears.

He is a co-owner of the Nairobi City Thunder.

== Professional career ==
=== Donar (2017–2018) ===
On July 19, 2017, Domingo signed a 1-year contract with Donar of the Dutch Basketball League. On September 19, 2017, Domingo made his debut for Donar in the Champions League qualifying rounds. Domingo's performance on both ends of the court was recognized during Donar's FIBA Europe Cup campaign. In the FIBA Europe Cup, Domingo averaged 8.9 points per game and 3.8 rebounds per game in 21.9 minutes played, shooting 66.7% on field goals and 37.5% on three-point field goals. He scored in double figures in four of nine Europe Cup games played, including 13 points in a win against Keravnos in the second round of Europe Cup and was instrumental in their second round win against Cluj. Domingo suffered an MCL sprain in 2018 and returned to the US for rehab.

=== Lakeland Magic (2019–2021) ===
In 2019, Stephen Domingo joined the Lakeland Magic. In his debut game for the club, Domingo played 31 minutes and recorded 8 points, 5 rebounds and 1 assist as the Magic defeated the Fort Wayne Mad Ants 117 - 89. In 11 total games for the club that season, Domingo averaged 8.5 points, 4.5 rebounds and 1.1 assists in 26.8 minutes.

=== 2021 NBA Summer League ===
In the 2021 NBA Summer League, Stephen Domingo played in three games for the San Antonio Spurs. He would have very limited playing time (8.4 minutes per game) and averaged 3 points, 2 rebounds and 1 assist in those three games.

=== Fort Wayne Mad Ants (2021–2022) ===
In 2021, Domingo joined the Fort Wayne Mad Ants. For the Tip-Off Tournament, Domingo played in 13 of the team's 14 games (missing a December 11 matchup against the Iowa Wolves) and averaged 3.2 points and 2.6 rebounds and helped the Mad Ants to a 9 - 5 tournament record.

For the regular season, Domingo played in all of the team's first 17 games of the season, averaging 2.8 points and 3.9 rebounds. However, he would suffer a season ending injury and would be waived by the Magic on February 22.

=== Tindastóll ===
In September 2023, Domingo signed with Tindastóll of the Icelandic Úrvalsdeild karla.

Domingo would only play two games for the club, averaging 4 points and 1.5 rebounds before the team announced on 24 October that it he was released.

== Executive career ==
Domingo co-founded Twende Sports Ltd. in Kenya in 2022 with Colin Rasmussen, and then purchased the Nairobi City Thunder of the KBF Premier League.

== International career ==
=== United States ===
Domingo played with the United States U17 team at the 2012 FIBA Under-17 World Championship, where he won gold with the team.

=== Nigeria ===
In June 2019, Domingo was announced as part of preliminary roster for the Nigerian team competing in the 2019 FIBA Basketball World Cup in China. On July 22, 2019, Domingo started for Nigeria in a friendly scrimmage against the FIBA World Cup-bound Dominican Republic national team, which Nigeria won. Domingo was the second leading scorer with 16 points on 54% shooting and 4/9 from 3 point range.

Domingo was named captain of Nigeria's national team at the F IBA AfroBasket 2021 in Kigali, Rwanda.
