= Roel Aarts =

Dutch basketball player

Personal information
- Born: 19 August 1993 (age 33) 's-Hertogenbosch, Netherlands
- Listed height: 2.05 m (6 ft 9 in)

Career information
- Playing career: 2013–2020
- Position: Center
- Number: 14

Career history
- 2013–2017: BSW
- 2017–2018: BAL
- 2018–2019: Den Bosch
- 2019–2020: BAL

Career highlights
- DBL rebounding leader (2018)

Roel Aarts (born 19 August 1993) is a Dutch retired basketball player. He played for New Heroes Den Bosch, BSW and BAL. In the 2017–18 season, Aarts led the DBL in rebounding.
