= Stan van den Elzen =

Dutch basketball player

No. 9 – Brussels Basketball
- Position: Small forward
- League: BNXT League

Personal information
- Born: 27 May 2000 (age 26) Rosmalen, Netherlands
- Listed height: 1.96 m (6 ft 5 in)

Career information
- Playing career: 2016–present

Career history
- 2016–2020: Heroes Den Bosch
- 2020–2022: Den Helder Suns
- 2022–2026: ZZ Leiden
- 2026-present: Brussels Basketball

Career highlights
- 2x Dutch League champion (2023), (2024); Dutch Cup winner (2023); 2x Dutch Supercup (2023), (2024); BNXT League champion (2023); DBL Most Improved Player (2021)
Medals
Men's basketball
Representing the Netherlands
FIBA Europe U18 Championship Division B
| Gold medal – first place | 2018 | National team |

Stan van den Elzen (born 27 May 2000) is a Dutch professional basketball player for ZZ Leiden of the BNXT League.

== Career ==
Stan van den Elzen was born in Rosmalen and played for his local team The Black Eagles during his youth years. Then, he moved to the academy of Heroes Den Bosch.

In the 2016–17 season, Van den Elzen made his debut with Heroes Den Bosch in the Dutch Basketball League (DBL) after playing four years with the youth section of the club.

On 5 August 2020, Van den Elzen signed with Den Helder Suns. After a successful season with Den Helder, he won the DBL Most Improved Player award.

On 23 January 2022, van den Elzen scored a career-high 35 points in an overtime loss against Landstede Hammers. He averaged a career best 14.0 points, 2.8 rebounds and 2.9 assists per game in the 2021–22 season.

On 16 June 2022, he signed a 2-year contract with ZZ Leiden. On 12 March 2023, he won the Dutch Basketball Cup with Leiden after defeating Landstede Hammers in the final.

== National team career ==
Van den Elzen played for the Netherlands U16, U18 and U20 teams. With U18, he won gold at the 2018 FIBA Europe Under-18 Championship Division B.
