= Worthy de Jong =

Dutch basketball player (born 1988)

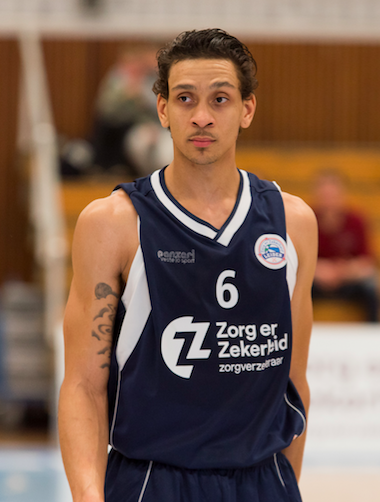
- De Jong playing for ZZ Leiden in 2016

Personal information
- Born: 14 March 1988 (age 38) Paramaribo, Suriname
- Listed height: 6 ft 3 in (1.91 m)
- Listed weight: 84 kg (185 lb)

Career information
- College: Ranger College (2006–2007)
- Playing career: 2009–2023
- Position: Shooting guard / small forward
- Number: 6, 18

Career history
- 2009–2010: Rotterdam Challengers
- 2010–2016: ZZ Leiden
- 2016–2017: SOMB
- 2017–2023: ZZ Leiden

Career highlights
- BNXT League champion (2022); BNXT League Finals MVP (2022); BNXT Defensive Player of the Year (2022); BNXT Dutch Player of the Year (2022); DBL Most Valuable Player (2016); DBL Playoffs MVP (2021); 3× DBL champion (2011, 2013, 2021); 2× Dutch Cup champion (2012, 2019); 3× Dutch Supercup champion (2011, 2012, 2021); 4× All-DBL Team (2013, 2015, 2016, 2021); DBL Defensive Player of the Year (2021); DBL Most Improved Player (2012); 5× DBL All-Star (2012–2016); DBL All-Star Game MVP (2016); 4× DBL All-Defense Team (2015, 2016, 2019, 2021); 3× DBL steals leader (2016, 2018, 2020); No. 6 retired by ZZ Leiden
Medals
Men's 3x3 basketball
Representing the Netherlands
Olympic Games
Gold medal – first place	2024 Paris	Team
FIBA 3x3 Europe Cup
Silver medal – second place	2026 Antwerp	Team

Worthy Donovan Rafael de Jong (born 14 March 1988) is a Dutch 3x3 basketball Olympic Gold medal winning player and former professional 5x5 player. Standing at 6 ft 3 in (1.91 m), De Jong plays the shooting guard or the small forward position.

He played 13 seasons as a professional player in the Netherlands, of which 11 were with ZZ Leiden. He is Leiden's all-time leader in points, rebounds and assists, and is nicknamed "Mister ZZ Leiden". With Leiden, he won three Dutch championships and two Dutch Cups. De Jong is widely regarded as one of the best Dutch basketball players of his generation and was considered the best player in the country in his prime.

De Jong also played for the Netherlands national team during ten years and represented the team at the EuroBasket in 2015 and 2022.

== Early life ==
Born in Paramaribo, De Jong was named after Los Angeles Lakers basketball player James Worthy. De Jong and his parents moved to Amsterdam when he was two years old. There, he started playing basketball at age 11. He started playing at Club 2000, motivated by his father who was a basketball player in Suriname.

In 2006, De Jong moved to the United States to attend Ranger College in Ranger, Texas, on a scholarship. Later, he returned to the Netherlands and played with Orca's Urk in the Promotiedivisie, the national second tier league.

== Professional career ==
=== Rotterdam (2009–2010) ===
De Jong signed with the Rotterdam Challengers of the Dutch Basketball League for the 2009–10 season, starting his professional career. Already known for his athletic ability, he participated in the dunk contest of the DBL All-Star Game. De Jong averaged 7.1 points and 3.9 rebounds in his rookie season.

=== First Leiden stint (2010–2016) ===
On 19 July 2010, De Jong signed a deal with ZZ Leiden. Under head coach Toon van Helfteren, De Jong was a rotation player in his first seasons. In the 2010–11 season, De Jong won his first DBL title after Leiden beat Donar 4–3 in the Finals. On 14 May 2011 he scored 28 points in the 107–89 Game 1 win over Donar.

In the following seasons with Leiden, De Jong grew into a star in the DBL. In the 2011–12 season, Leiden reached the finals but lost to EiffelTowers Den Bosch. Leiden did manage to win the NBB Cup, De Jong's first of such trophy. De Jong averaged 6.3 points and 3.2 rebounds per game that season. Individually, he received his first DBL Most Improved Player award after his improved role on the team.

In his third season with Leiden, the 2012–13 season, De Jong won his second title after Leeuwarden was swept in the finals, 4–0. He scored a team-high 18 points in the 74–64 Game 3 victory over Aris. Statistically, De Jong had a large improvement as he averaged 13.5 points and 5.8 rebounds, on 52.2% shooting, over the season.

In the 2014 offseason, De Jong signed a new three-year contract with Leiden. On 4 October 2014 he scored a career-high 35 points in a 113–81 win over Aris Leeuwarden. Leiden failed to return to a fourth consecutive finals as they were defeated by Donar in the semifinals.

In the 2015–16 season, De Jong won his first DBL Most Valuable Player Award of his career, after averaging 17.2 points, 6.6 rebounds, 3.5 assists per game. He was the tenth Dutch player in history to win the award. Despite his MVP season, Leiden was eliminated by Donar in the semifinals for a second year in a row.

=== France (2016–2017) ===
In June 2016, De Jong signed with SOMB Boulogne-sur-Mer of the French second national division Pro B. Over the 2016–17 Pro B season, De Jong averaged 9.7 points, 3 rebounds and 2 assists per game, as SOMB finished in 17th place and was relegated to the third division Nationale Masculine 1 (NM1).

=== Second stint with Leiden (2017–2022) ===
On 28 June 2017, De Jong returned to his former club ZZ Leiden by signing a one-year contract. He averaged 16 points and 6.1 rebounds in his first season back and helped the team return to the finals. In his fourth finals appearance, Leiden was swept by a dominant Donar team.

In June 2018, he extended his contract for two more seasons. In the 2018–19 season, De Jong won his second NBB Cup title with Leiden. In the DBL, he averaged 16.8 points, 4.5 rebounds and 3.3 assists.

De Jong signed a three-year extension with the team on 29 May 2020. He won the DBL Defensive Player of the Year award for the first time in the 2020–21 season. De Jong also won his third championship after defeating Heroes Den Bosch in the finals, and he was named DBL Playoffs MVP in the process (he was the first Leiden player to win the award).

On 3 April 2022 De Jong announced the 2021–22 season would be his last professional season; he would continue in 3x3 basketball with the Netherlands national team, however. He finished his career by winning the inaugural BNXT League championship and was named the Finals MVP of the finals against Donar.

De Jong finished his career as ZZ Leiden's all-time leader in points, rebounds, assists and steals. On 22 October 2022 the club retired his jersey number 6.

=== Short return from retirement (2023) ===
On 20 January 2023, ZZ Leiden announced De Jong had signed a temporary contract, while still continuing playing 3x3 basketball for Basketball Nederland. On 1 March, Leiden announced he had left the roster again. De Jong played four games in the 2022–23 BNXT League season and averaged five points per game off the bench in his short return.

== International career ==
De Jong played for the Netherlands national basketball team after he made his debut on 28 July 2012 under Jan Willem Jansen. He made his debut at a major international tournament during EuroBasket 2015. On 5 September De Jong scored 16 points in a 73–72 win over Georgia that marked the Netherlands' first EuroBasket win in 26 years. He averaged 9.4 points per game over the tournament.

De Jong played his second EuroBasket tournament in 2022 after he had announced his retirement prior to the tournament. In the opening game, he scored 28 points in a 76–100 loss to Serbia. In his last national team game, he scored a team-high 21 points in a 67–88 loss to Finland. De Jong averaged a team-leading 16.4 points on 49.2% shooting, as the Netherlands ended the tournament with a 0–5 record.

He went on to play 118 games for the national team, 13th most of all-time in the history of the national team.

=== EuroBasket statistics ===
Year	Team	GP	GS	MPG	FG%	3P%	FT%	RPG	APG	SPG	BPG	PPG
2015	Netherlands	5	5	21.1	.533	.667	.812	4.6	1.0	.8	.0	9.4
2022	Netherlands	5	5	30.5	.492	.447	.714	3.0	1.6	1.8	.4	16.4

== 3x3 basketball ==
After retiring from professional basketball with ZZ Leiden, De Jong continued a career in 3x3 basketball.

=== National 3x3 team ===
At the 2024 Paris Olympics, De Jong played a crucial role in the Netherlands' victory in the men's 3x3 basketball final, securing the gold medal. His 2-pointer in overtime secured an 18-17 win for the Netherlands over France in the final. De Jong also scored vital points during regulation, tying the game with a layup with less than three seconds remaining.

=== Club 3x3 team ===
On November 24, De Jong won the 2024 FIBA 3x3 World Tour title in Hong Kong with Amsterdam.

== Honours ==
=== Club ===
ZZ Leiden

- BNXT League: 2021–22
- 3× Dutch Basketball League: 2010–11, 2012–13, 2020–21
- 2× Dutch Cup: 2011–12, 2018–19
- 3× Dutch Supercup: 2011, 2012, 2021

=== Individual ===
- ZZ Leiden all-time leader in points scored
- ZZ Leiden all-time leader in rebounds
- ZZ Leiden all-time leader in assists
- BNXT League Finals MVP: 2021–22
- BNXT League Defensive Player of the Year: 2021–22
- BNXT League Sixth Man of the Year: 2021–22
- BNXT Dutch Player of the Year: 2021–22
- DBL Most Valuable Player: 2015–16
- DBL Playoffs MVP: 2021
- 4× DBL All-League Team 2012–13, 2014–15, 2015–16, 2020–21
- DBL Most Improved Player: 2011–12
- DBL Defensive Player of the Year: 2020–21
- 5× DBL All-Star: 2012, 2013, 2014, 2015, 2016
- DBL All-Star Game MVP: 2016

=== 3x3 basketball ===
- FIBA 3x3 World Tour: 2024
- FIBA 3x3 World Tour Finals MVP: 2024

Olympic Games
Preceded by Irene Schouten	Flag bearer for the Netherlands; 2024 opening ceremony With: Lois Abbingh	Succeeded by Femke Bol; Harrie Lavreysen
