= Brandyn Curry =

American basketball player (born 1991)

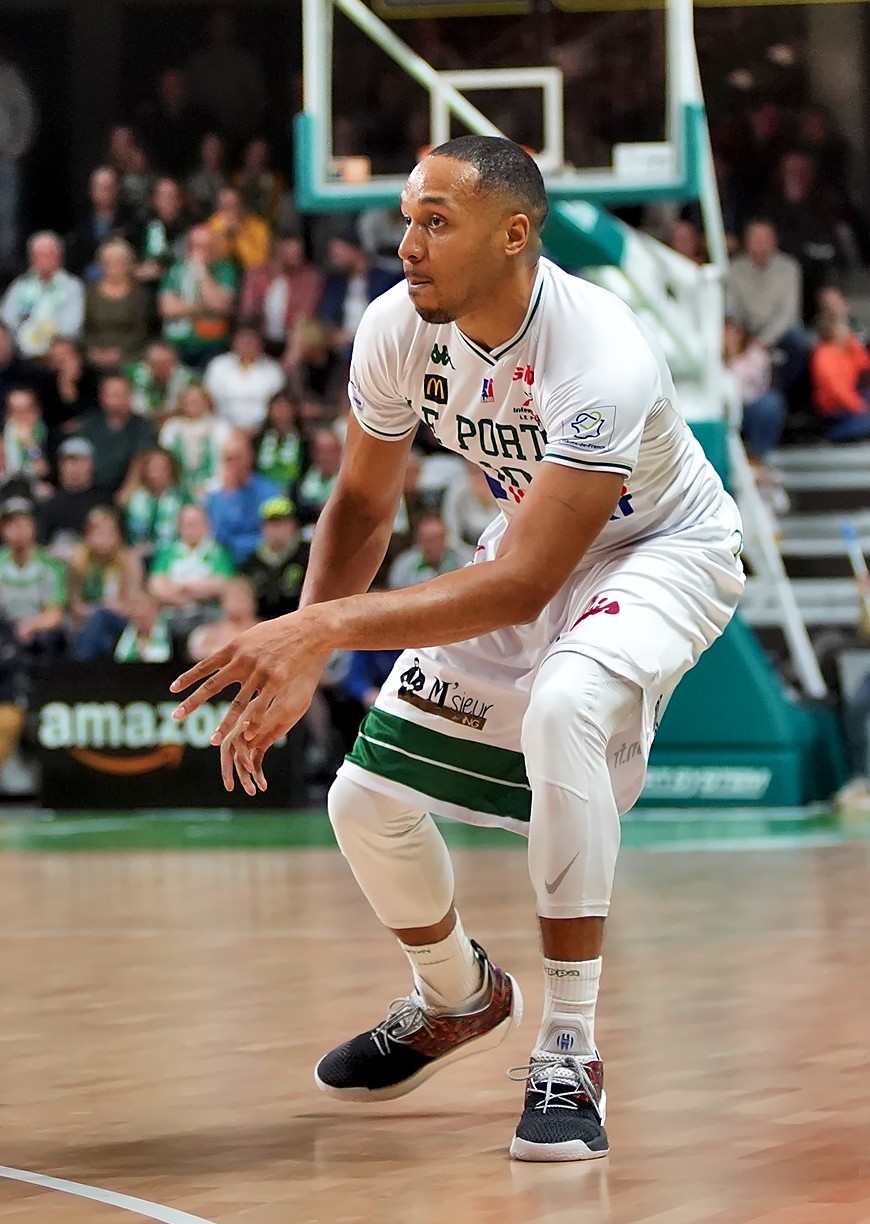
- Curry with Le Portel in 2018

Free agent
- Position: Point guard

Personal information
- Born: October 2, 1991 (age 34) Huntersville, North Carolina, U.S.
- Listed height: 6 ft 1 in (1.85 m)
- Listed weight: 195 lb (88 kg)

Career information
- High school: Hopewell (Huntersville, North Carolina)
- College: Harvard (2009–2014)
- NBA draft: 2014: undrafted
- Playing career: 2014–present

Career history
- 2014–2015: Den Bosch
- 2015–2016: Eisbären Bremerhaven
- 2016–2017: Helios Suns
- 2017–2018: Donar
- 2018–2019: ESSM Le Portel
- 2019–2020: U-BT Cluj-Napoca

Career highlights
- 2× DBL champion (2015, 2018); DBL Most Valuable Player (2018); 2× DBL Playoffs MVP (2015, 2018); DBL Statistical Player of the Year (2018); Dutch Cup champion (2018); 2× All-DBL Team (2015, 2018)

Brandyn Curry (born October 2, 1991) is an American professional basketball player, who lastly played for U-BT Cluj-Napoca. Curry played five seasons collegiately for Harvard.

== College career ==
Curry played collegiately at Harvard. As a sophomore, Curry was a second-team All-Ivy selection for the 2011–12 Ivy League men's basketball season. In September 2012, he was involved in a cheating scandal that involved about 125 athletes and students, leading to his withdrawal. Curry and teammate Kyle Casey, who was also ensnared, withdrew from school in hopes of preserving their final year of athletic eligibility following the investigation.

After scoring 14 points and adding 6 assists, 4 rebounds, 3 steals and 2 blocks while playing 37 minutes in the first game of his senior season, Curry missed the next three games due to a foot injury. After starting the season 4–0, the team lost its first game on the road against Pac-12 Conference Colorado on November 24. Curry re-aggravated his foot against Colorado and was described as out indefinitely by Amaker.

== Professional career ==
In August 2014, Curry signed his first professional contract with SPM Shoeters Den Bosch. After he won the league championship with SPM, he was named the DBL Playoffs MVP.

In June 2015, Curry signed with Eisbären Bremerhaven. On July 18, 2016, he signed with the Slovenian team Helios Suns.

On June 6, 2017, Curry returned to the Netherlands by signing a one-year contract with the defending DBL champion Donar. On April 23, 2018, Curry was named the DBL Most Valuable Player of the 2017–18 season, after leading Donar to a first place in the DBL regular season. Curry was honored with a place in the All-DBL Team as well. On May 29, 2018, Curry won his second DBL championship with Donar and was named the DBL Play-offs MVP for the second time in his career, after averaging a team-high 16.2 points and 6.5 assists over eight play-off games.

On May 31, 2018, Curry was announced by ESSM Le Portel of the French top tier LNB Pro A.

On July 9, 2019, Curry signed a one-year contract with U-BT Cluj-Napoca of the Romanian Liga Națională.

== Honours ==
Donar

- DBL champion (2018)
- Dutch Cup champion (2018)

Den Bosch

- DBL champion (2015)

=== Individual awards ===
- 2× DBL Playoffs MVP (2015, 2018)
- DBL Most Valuable Player (2018)
- DBL Statistical Player of the Year (2018)
- 2× All-DBL Team (2015, 2018)
