= Mike Miklusak =

American basketball player

Free Agent
- Position: Small forward

Personal information
- Born: March 17, 1995 (age 31) Dyer, Indiana
- Listed height: 198 cm (6 ft 6 in)
- Listed weight: 86 kg (190 lb)

Career information
- High school: Lake Central (St. John, Indiana)
- College: Western Illinois (2013–2017)
- NBA draft: 2017: undrafted
- Playing career: 2017–present

Career history
- 2017–2018: New Heroes Den Bosch
- 2018: Gries Oberhoffen

Mike Miklusak (born March 17, 1995) is an American professional basketball player who last played for Gries Oberhoffen.

== Professional career ==
On July 15, 2017, Miklusak signed with New Heroes Den Bosch of the Dutch Basketball League (DBL).
