= Anthony Marshall (basketball) =

American basketball player

Free agent
- Position: Point guard

Personal information
- Born: March 20, 1991 (age 35) Bastrop, Louisiana
- Listed height: 1.90 m (6 ft 3 in)
- Listed weight: 91 kg (201 lb)

Career information
- High school: Mojave (North Las Vegas, Nevada)
- College: UNLV (2009–2013)
- NBA draft: 2013: undrafted
- Playing career: 2013–present

Career history
- 2013–2014: Ferro-NZTU
- 2014: Hapoel Tel Aviv
- 2015–2017: Leuven Bears
- 2017–2018: Den Bosch
- Stats at Basketball Reference

Anthony Carl Marshall (born 20 March 1991) is an American basketball player, who last played for New Heroes Den Bosch of the Dutch Basketball League (DBL). Standing at 1.90 m (6 ft 3 in), Marshall usually plays as point guard.

== College career ==
Marshall played for UNLV, where he became the first Runnin' Rebel in 20 years to play in four straight NCAA Tournaments. As a senior, he averaged 10.4 points and 4.1 rebounds per game with a 2.1 assist-to-turnover ratio. He was a second-team All-Mountain West selection as a senior.

== Professional career ==
On 11 August 2017, Marshall signed with New Heroes Den Bosch of the Dutch Basketball League (DBL). On 4 March 2018, Marshall suffered from a torn Achilles tendon which caused him to miss the remainder of the 2017–18 season.
