= Ordane Kanda-Kanyinda =

Belgian basketball player (born 1996)

Free agent
- Position: Point guard

Personal information
- Born: 9 September 1996 (age 30) Antwerp, Belgium
- Listed height: 184 cm (6 ft 0 in)
- Listed weight: 85 kg (187 lb)

Career information
- Playing career: 2013–present

Career history
- 2013–2018: Antwerp Giants
- 2017–2018: →Rotterdam
- 2018–2019: Kangoeroes Mechelen
- 2019: Spirou
- 2020: Heroes Den Bosch
- 2020–2021: Feyenoord

Career highlights
- DBL scoring champion (2018)

Ordane Kanda-Kanyinda (born 9 September 1996) is a Belgian professional basketball player who last played for Feyenoord Basketball.

== Professional career ==
Kanda-Kanyinda was born in Antwerp and played in the youth development department of Antwerp Giants, where he started his professional basketball career. He played his first game for Antwerp's first team in the 2013–14 season, in the EuroChallenge campaign.

The season 2016–17 was his first year where he was a definitive member of the first Antwerp Giants team. Antwerp finished second in the regular season and lost in the semi-finals of the playoffs.

On 3 July 2017, Kanda-Kanyinda was sent on a one-year loan to Forward Lease Rotterdam of the Dutch Basketball League (DBL). Kanda-Kanyinda led the DBL in scoring, after averaging 18.77 points per game while leading Forward Lease to the play-offs. On 5 May 2018, Kanda recorded 36 points and 11 assists in a decisive game 3 of the quarter-finals, which Rotterdam won 89–92. Rotterdam reached the DBL semi-finals for the first time in 12 years.

In October 2018, Kanda signed with Kangoeroes Basket Mechelen.

Kanda signed with Spirou for the 2019–20 season.

On 4 February 2020, Kanda signed a try-out contract with Heroes Den Bosch.

On 17 July 2020, Kanda returned to Rotterdam, now named Feyenoord.

== Career statistics ==
Legend
GP	Games played	GS	Games started	MPG	Minutes per game
FG%	Field goal percentage	3P%	3-point field goal percentage	FT%	Free throw percentage
RPG	Rebounds per game	APG	Assists per game	SPG	Steals per game
BPG	Blocks per game	PPG	Points per game	**Bold**	Career high

†	Denotes seasons in which he won the championship
*	Led the league

=== Domestic leagues ===
Year	Team	GP	GS	MPG	FG%	3P%	FT%	RPG	APG	SPG	BPG	PPG
2014–15	Antwerp Giants	2	0	3.0	.000	–	.500	0.5	1.0	0.0	0.0	1.0
2015–16	Antwerp Giants	19	0	8.1	.333	.000	.500	0.5	0.4	0.1	0.1	1.3
2016–17	Antwerp Giants	32	14	11.7	.419	.148	.679	0.8	1.1	0.3	0.1	3.0
2017–18	Rotterdam	38	38	31.2	.500	.360	.727	5.6	4.5	1.4	0.3	18.5*

Source: RealGM
