= Rotterdam City Basketball =

Basketball team in Rotterdam

Coordinates: 51.893977°N 4.526486°E

Zeeuw & Zeeuw Rotterdam City
- Nickname: RCB
- Leagues: BNXT League
- Founded: 1954; 72 years ago
- History: AMVJ; 1954–1988; Rotterdam Basketbal; 1988–2018; Feyenoord Basketbal; 2018–2025; Rotterdam City Basketball; 2025–2026; Zeeuw & Zeeuw Rotterdam City; 2026–present
- Arena: Topsportcentrum Rotterdam
- Capacity: 2,000
- Location: Rotterdam, Netherlands
- Team colors: Green, Blue
- Main sponsor: Zeeuw & Zeeuw
- President: Chiel den Dunnen
- General manager: Paul de Vos; Armand Salomon
- Head coach: Jeroen van Vugt
- Team captain: Nino Vrecken
- Championships: 1 Dutch Cup
- Website: rcb.nl

Rotterdam City Basketball, also known as Zeeuw & Zeeuw Rotterdam City for sponsorship reasons, is a Dutch professional basketball club based in Rotterdam. The team plays in the BNXT League and plays its home games at the Topsportcentrum next to De Kuip in Rotterdam. Established in 1954, it became the basketball section of the football club Feyenoord in 2018. However, this cooperation was dissolved in 2025.

Rotterdam won their only trophy in 1985, when they won the domestic NBB Cup. The team has reached the semi-finals of the Dutch League playoffs three times in history.

== History ==
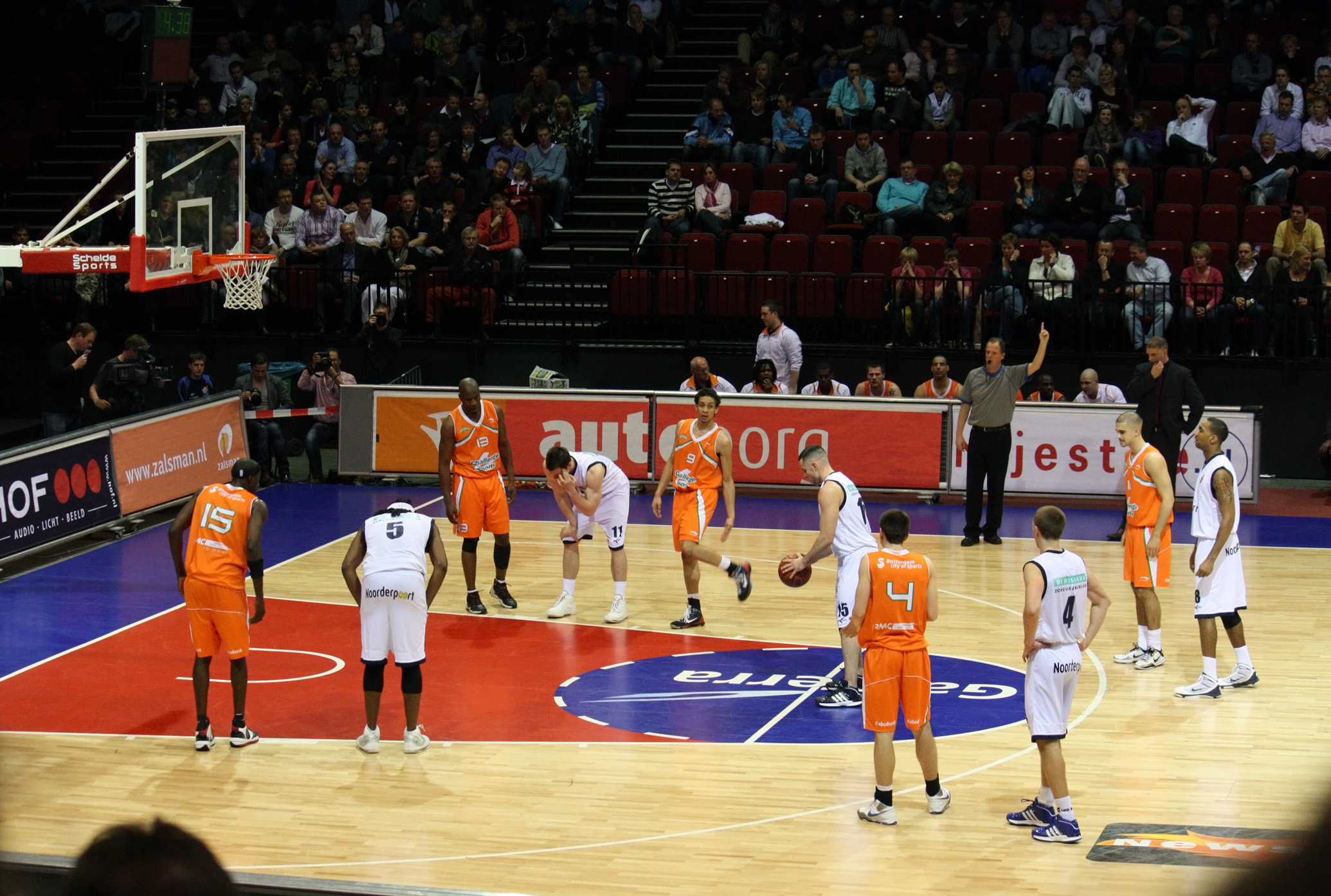
The Rotterdam Challengers in an away match against the GasTerra Flames in 2010

Challenge Sports Rotterdam started in 1954 under the name AMVJ Rotterdam. The first sponsor of the club was Gunco in 1988, which was their first year in the highest Dutch league. They only lasted a year and demoted to a lower division. In 1991 they returned with sponsor De Schiestreek, followed by the Rotterdam firm Idetrading in 1995. After a sponsorless year, Gunco then again returned as title sponsor in 1999. Johan Haga has made possible following a restart. This created a new name, new look, new logo and a change in the player selection. In 2002, the team took the name Rotterdam Basketbal, without sponsorname. In 2007 the team was renamed to Rotterdam Challengers, but in 2010 they again took the name Rotterdam Basketbal. Starting with the 2011–2012 season, the name became Rotterdam Basketbal College, to underline the importance of the youth in the team. During the 2013–14 season, the club got a new main sponsor in Challenge Sports and the team's name was changed to Challenge Sports Rotterdam.

=== Feyenoord Basketball era (2018–2025) ===
In May 2018, Rotterdam reached the DBL semi-finals for the first time in 12 years, after upsetting Den Bosch in the quarter-finals, 1–2. This month the club announced as well that it would be named Feyenoord Basketball starting with the 2018–19 season, as the team became a part of the multi-sports club of association football club Feyenoord.

On 15 April 2019, accomplished head coach Toon van Helfteren signed a two-year contract to become the head coach of Feyenoord.

Since the 2021–22 season, Feyenoord plays in the BNXT League, in which the national leagues of Belgium and the Netherlands have been merged.

=== Rotterdam City Basketball (2025–present) ===
In the 2025 offseason, the club announced that it ended its collaboration with Feyenoord, with the aim of having more room to attract its own commercial partners. The club was rebranded as Rotterdam City Basketball starting from the 2025–26 season. The logo was announced in June, with the new team's colors being navy blue and green.

== Names ==
Due to sponsorship reasons, the club has known several names:

- 1988–1989: Gunco Rotterdam
- 1989-1995: De Schiestreek Rotterdam
- 1995–1999: Idétrading Rotterdam
- 1999–2002: Gunco Rotterdam
- 2002–2007: Rotterdam Basketbal
- 2007–2010: Rotterdam Challengers
- 2010–2011: Rotterdam Basketbal
- 2011–2014: Rotterdam Basketbal College
- 2014–2016: Challenge Sports Rotterdam
- 2016–2018: Forward Lease Rotterdam
- 2018–2019: Feyenoord Basketball
- 2019–2025: Zeeuw & Zeeuw Feyenoord
- 2025–2026: Rotterdam City Basketball
- 2026–present: Zeeuw & Zeeuw Rotterdam City

== Players ==
=== Current roster ===
Zeeuw & Zeeuw Rotterdam City roster
Players
Coaches

Pos.	No.	Nat.	Name	Ht.	Age
SG	1	(United States)	Tomashek, Marcus	1.98 m (6 ft 6 in)	23 – 6 August 2003
PG	2	(Netherlands)	van la Parra, Chermano	1.83 m (6 ft 0 in)	19 – 17 January 2007
F	4	(Netherlands)	Verkerk, Jonathan	1.98 m (6 ft 6 in)	22 – 16 November 2003
G	5	(Netherlands)	Williams, Leon	1.90 m (6 ft 3 in)	35 – 25 July 1991
G	7	(Netherlands)	Ondaan, Kenyuoe	1.93 m (6 ft 4 in)	27 – 7 March 1999
G	10	(Netherlands)	Melfor, Savior	1.92 m (6 ft 4 in)	21 – 12 February 2005
PG	12	(Spain)	Meana, Alonso	1.80 m (5 ft 11 in)	26 – 20 March 2000
SF	14	(Netherlands)	Boone, Dirk	2.03 m (6 ft 8 in)	20 – 15 June 2006
SF	15	(Finland)	Tumba, Thomas	1.96 m (6 ft 5 in)	25 – 15 April 2001
F	23	(United States)	Gaines, Isaiah	2.03 m (6 ft 8 in)	23 – 21 January 2003
F/C	24	(Netherlands)	Grantsaan, Lagio	2.02 m (6 ft 8 in)	29 – 23 September 1997

Head coach

- (Netherlands) Jeroen van Vugt

Legend

- (C) Team captain
- (DP) Development player
- (I) Import player
- Injured

- Roster
Updated: October 13, 2026

Note: Flags indicate national team eligibility at FIBA-sanctioned events. Players may hold other non-FIBA nationalities not displayed.

=== Notable players ===
Note: Flags indicate national team eligibility at FIBA-sanctioned events. Players may hold other non-FIBA nationalities not displayed.

Criteria

To appear in this section a player must have either:

- Set a club record or won an individual award while at the club
- Played at least one official international match for their national team at any time
- Played at least one official NBA match at any time.

- (The Bahamas) Cedric Miller
  (1 season: 1988–89)
- (Serbia and Montenegro) Slobodan Kaličanin
  (1 season: 1997–98)
- (United States) Joshua Helm
  (1 season: 2005–06)
- (Netherlands) Ties Theeuwkens
  (6 seasons: 2004–05, 2014–19)
- (Netherlands) Arvin Slagter
  (4 seasons: 2003–07)
- (Netherlands) Chip Jones
  (5 seasons: 2008–13)
- (Nigeria) Ike Nwankwo
  (1 season: 2009)
- (Netherlands) Worthy de Jong
  (1 season: 2009–10)
- (Netherlands) Patrick Hilliman
  (2 seasons: 2009–11)
- (Netherlands) Leon Williams
  (1 season: 2011–12)
- (United States) Anthony Miles
  (1 season: 2012–13)
- (United States) La'Shard Anderson
  (3 seasons: 2013–14, 2016–17, 2018)
- (Netherlands) Yannick Franke
  (2 seasons: 2013–15)
- (Belgium) Ordane Kanda-Kanyinda
  (1 season: 2017–18)
- (Syria) Michael Madanly
  (1 season: 2017–18)

=== Individual awards ===
All-DBL Team

- Patrick Hilliman – 2010
- Arūnas Mikalauskas – 2021

DBL Coach of the Year

- Erik Braal – 2006

DBL MVP Under 23

- Arvin Slagter – 2006

DBL Rookie of the Year

- Jeroen Slor – 2008

DBL Most Improved Player

- Leon Williams – 2012
- Yannick Franke – 2015

DBL All-Rookie Team

- Yasalde Pas Costa – 2007
- Yannick Franke – 2014
- Nigel Onuoha – 2015

== Club records ==
Bold denotes still active with team. As of 14 April 2021:

Category	Player	Record
Games played	Ties Theeuwkens	283
Points scored	Ties Theeuwkens	1,862
Rebounds	Robert Krabbendam	917
Assists	Ties Theeuwkens	433
Steals	Stephan van der Schoot	277
Blocks	Chaz Briggs	85
Three-point field goals	Ties Theeuwkens	376

== Trophies ==
- **NBB Cup**
  - Winners (1): 1984–85
    - Runners-up (1): 2005–06

== Season by season ==
Season	Tier	League	Pos.	Postseason	NBB Cup
1988–89	1	Eredivisie	9	–	
1991–92	1	Eredivisie	11	–	
1992–93	1	Eredivisie	8	Quarterfinalist	
1993–94	1	Eredivisie	9	–	
1994–95	1	Eredivisie	8	–	
1995–96	1	Eredivisie	3	Quarterfinalist	
1996–97	1	Eredivisie	6	Quarterfinalist	
1997–98	1	Eredivisie	6	Quarterfinalist	
1998–99	1	Eredivisie	8	Quarterfinalist	
1999–00	1	Eredivisie	8	Quarterfinalist	
2000–01	1	Eredivisie	5	–	
2001–02	1	Eredivisie	10	–	
2002–03	1	Eredivisie	9	–	
2003–04	1	Eredivisie	9	–	
2004–05	1	Eredivisie	4	Semifinalist	
2005–06	1	Eredivisie	4	Semifinalist	Runner-up
2007–08	1	Eredivisie	6	Quarterfinalist	
2008–09	1	Eredivisie	10	–	
2009–10	1	Eredivisie	10	–	4th round
2010–11	1	DBL	10	–	4th round
2011–12	1	DBL	8	–	Quarterfinalist
2012–13	1	DBL	10	–	4th round
2013–14	1	DBL	9	–	Quarterfinalist
2014–15	1	DBL	5	Quarterfinalist	Quarterfinalist
2015–16	1	DBL	6	Quarterfinalist	
2016–17	1	DBL	5	Quarterfinalist	
2017–18	1	DBL	5	Semifinalist	
2018–19	1	DBL	8	Quarterfinalist	

Champions	Runners-up	Playoff berth

Season	Tier	League	Finish	Wins	Losses	Win%	National Playoffs	NBB Cup	BNXT Playoffs	Head coach
**Rotterdam Basketbal**
2012–13	1	DBL	10th	3	33	.083	–	Fourth Round	–	Randy Wiel
2013–14	1	DBL	9th	7	29	.194	–	Quarterfinalist	–	Ferry Steenmetz
2014–15	1	DBL	5th	8	20	.286	Lost quarterfinals (Landstede), 0–2		–	Armand Salomon
2015–16	1	DBL	6th	9	19	.321	Lost quarterfinals (Donar), 0–2		–	Armand Salomon
2016–17	1	DBL	5th	12	16	.429	Lost quarterfinals (Den Bosch), 0–2		–	Armand Salomon
2017–18	1	DBL	5th	15	17	.469	**Won** quarterfinals (Den Bosch), 3–1; Lost semifinals (Donar), 0–4	Fourth Round	–	Armand Salomon
**Feyenoord Basketball**
2018–19	1	DBL	8th	9	25	.265	Lost quarterfinals (ZZ Leiden), 0–2	Quarterfinalist	–	Richard den Os; Jan Stalman (a.i.)
2019–20	1	DBL	5th	12	10	.545	Cancelled (Note: The 2019–20 season was cancelled prematurely due to the COVID-19 pandemic outbreak.)	Quarterfinalist	–	Toon van Helfteren
2020–21	1	DBL	5th	10	11	.476	Lost quarterfinals (Landstede, 158–180)	Semifinalist	–	Toon van Helfteren
2021–22	1	BNXT League	10th	10	20	.333	Lost quarterfinals (Landstede, 0–2)	Quarterfinalist	**Won** second round (BAL, 158–138); Lost third round (Mons, 143–162)	Toon van Helfteren
2022–23	1	BNXT League	17th	10	18	.357	–	Semifinalist	Lost first round (Brussels, 137–152)	Toon van Helfteren
2023–24	1	BNXT League	18th	8	20	.286	Lost quarterfinals (ZZ Leiden, 0–2)	Semifinalist	–	Tim Arns
2024–25	1	BNXT League	17th	9	27	.250	–	Semifinalist	–	Tim Arns
**Rotterdam City Basketball**
2025–26	1	BNXT League	17th	4	30	.118	–	Quarterfinalist	–	Tim Arns; Deividas Kumelis

== Head coaches ==
Period	Name	Honours
2003–2008	(Netherlands) Erik Braal	NBB Cup runner-up: 2006
2008–2009	(United States) Terence Stansbury	
2009–2011	(Netherlands) Zlatko Jezerkic	
2011–2013	(Netherlands) Randy Wiel	
2013–2014	(Netherlands) Ferry Steenmetz	
2014–2018	(Netherlands) Armand Salomon	
2018–2019	(Netherlands) Richard den Os	
2019	(Netherlands) Jan Stalman (interim)	
2019–2023	(Netherlands) Toon van Helfteren	
2023	(Netherlands) Armand Salomon (interim)	
2023–2026	(Netherlands) Tim Arns	
2026	(Lithuania) Deividas Kumelis (interim)	
2026–present	(Netherlands) Jeroen van Vugt	
