= BAL (basketball) =

Coordinates: 51.254740°N 5.679090°E

PrismaWorx BAL
- Leagues: Promotiedivisie
- Founded: 9 April 2013; 13 years ago
- History: BAL (2013–present)
- Arena: Sporthal Boshoven
- Capacity: 1,000
- Location: Weert, Limburg, Netherlands
- President: Jeroen van Veen
- Head coach: Nikola Stojkovic
- Championships: 1 Dutch Cup
- Website: basketbalacademielimburg.nl
Home	Away

Former logo of the club, used until 2017

Basketball Academie Limburg, commonly known as BAL and for sponsorship reasons as PrismaWorx BAL, is a Dutch basketball club based in Weert in the province of Limburg. The club was founded in 2013 as an academy to develop youth players from the province of Limburg. The club entered the Dutch Basketball League for the 2017–18 season after the dissolution of the professional team BSW. Currently, the team plays in the Promotiedivisie.

In 2021, BAL won its first-ever trophy when it won the DBL Cup in surprising fashion as the team was ranked eight in the DBL that season.

== History ==
=== Foundation ===
The club was established on 9 April 2013 to function as a club for regional talent from the province of Limburg. In its first years, the team played with several youth teams in domestic competitions.

In the 2017 offseason the professional club BSW from Weert and BAL intended a merger, which would integrate BSW into BAL. Following BSW going defunct during this offseason, BAL decided to take its place in the DBL. As BAL played in the same home arena and the team consisted of several of the same players, the team can be considered a phoenix club. Radenko Varagić coached the team.

=== First DBL seasons ===
In its debut season, BAL finished in the ninth and last place in the DBL, winning 4 out of its 32 games. The team consisted of a selection of young promising players, such as guard Sam van Dijk who was named the DBL Most Improved Player in the club's debut season. On 1 August 2018, BAL signed its first ever foreign player when American center Tony Washington signed for one year. In its second season, BAL once again finished last in the DBL with this time five wins in 2018–19.

In the 2020–21 season, BAL reached the playoffs for the first time after finishing in the eight seed. This season the team also won the 2021 DBL Cup, the club's first-ever trophy. In the semi-finals, BAL upset first-seeded ZZ Leiden and in the final the team was too strong for Yoast United. Trevor Jasinsky led the team in scoring in the final with 27 points.

Since the 2021–22 season, BAL plays in the BNXT League, in which the national leagues of Belgium and the Netherlands have been merged.

In June 2024, BAL signed its first name sponsorship contract and agreed to be named PrismaWorx BAL for three years, starting from the 2024–25 season.

=== Voluntary relegation ===
In march 2026, the club announced that they would not apply for a license for the BNXT League season 26-27. The club was unable to find sufficient sponsors and capabale management to remain competitive in the league. The club hopes to join the new Dutch league which is to be founded as a level between Promotiedivisie and BNXT League.

== Honours ==
DBL Cup

- Champions (1): 2021

Dutch Supercup

- Runners-up (1): 2021

== Season by season ==
Season	Tier	League	Pos.	NBB Cup
BAL
2016–17	4	1e divisie	9th	
2017–18	1	DBL	9th	Withdrew
2018–19	1	DBL	9th	Eightfinals
2019–20	1	DBL	6th (Note: The 2019–20 season was cancelled in March because of the COVID-19 pandemic.)	Eightfinals
2020–21	1	DBL	8th	Champion
2021–22	1	BNXT League	NL 7th	Fourth Round
2021–22	1	BNXT League	BNXT 15th	Fourth Round
2022–23	1	BNXT League	NL 8th	Fourth Round
2022–23	1	BNXT League	BNXT 18th	Fourth Round
2023–24	1	BNXT League	NL 5th	Quarterfinals
2023–24	1	BNXT League	BNXT 10th	Quarterfinals
2024–25	1	BNXT League	NL 8th	Eightfinals
2024–25	1	BNXT League	BNXT 18th	Eightfinals
2025–26	1	BNXT League	NL 8th	Eightfinals
2025–26	1	BNXT League	BNXT 18th	Eightfinals
2026–27	2	Promotiedivisie		

== Players ==
=== Current roster ===
BAL roster
Players
Coaches

Pos.	No.	Nat.	Name	Ht.	Age
PG	2	(Netherlands)	Sibilo, Romano	1.90 m (6 ft 3 in)	22 – 14 May 2004
F	3	(France)	Bonfils, Lucas	1.96 m (6 ft 5 in)	22 – 5 September 2004
C	4	(Netherlands)	Afolabi, Adekule	1.91 m (6 ft 3 in)	21 – 7 May 2005
SF	7	(Netherlands)	Ondaan, Kenyuoe	1.90 m (6 ft 3 in)	27 – 7 March 1999
PG	8	(Netherlands)	Strojil, Armin	1.85 m (6 ft 1 in)	23 – 24 June 2003
SG	11	(Netherlands)	Vogelaar, Renars	1.93 m (6 ft 4 in)	22 – 9 February 2004
PG	13	(Slovenia)	Ličan, Lon	1.97 m (6 ft 6 in)	21 – 31 January 2005
F/C	14	(Netherlands)	van Holst, Niels	2.03 m (6 ft 8 in)	22 – 26 August 2004
SF	17	(Switzerland)	Muhr, Ryan	1.96 m (6 ft 5 in)	24 – 17 August 2002
F	33	(Netherlands)	De Graff, Kjell	2.08 m (6 ft 10 in)	27 – 8 September 1999
F	81	(France) (Senegal)	Sene, Kara	1.96 m (6 ft 5 in)	20 – 10 July 2006
C	91	(Belgium)	Hautekeet, Milo	2.05 m (6 ft 9 in)	22 – 7 June 2004

Head coach

- Vacant

Assistant coach(es)

- (Netherlands) Koen van Gerwen
- (Spain) Manuel Luis Suárez Marín-Ricky

Legend

- (C) Team captain
- (DP) Development player
- (I) Import player
- Injured

- Roster
- Transactions
Updated: September 30, 2025

Note: Flags indicate national team eligibility at FIBA-sanctioned events. Players may hold other non-FIBA nationalities not displayed.

=== Individual awards ===
BNXT League Rising Star of the Year

- Sander Hollanders – 2022

DBL Most Improved Player

- Sam van Dijk – 2018

DBL All-Rookie Team

- Jacco Fritz – 2018
- Nino Gorissen – 2018
- Ivan Simic – 2019

=== Top scorers by seasons ===
The following players led BAL in scoring in each DBL or BNXT League season:

Season	Name	PPG
2017–18	(Netherlands) Sam van Dijk	12.2
2018–19	(United States) Tony Washington	12.2
2019–20	(United States) Trey Burch-Manning	14.5
2020–21	(United States) Trevor Jasinsky	15.8
2021–22	(Republic of Ireland) D. J. Mitchell	16.0
2022–23	(Belgium) Noel Botuli	11.9
2023–24	(Belgium) Noel Botuli	12.7
2024–25	(France) Lionel Colson	14.9
2025–26	(Senegal) Kara Sene	14.4

== Club records ==
Bold denotes still active with team. As of 14 April 2021:

Category	Player	Record
Games played	**Wietze Nossek**	120
Points scored	**Wietze Nossek**	754
Rebounds	Roel Aarts	443
Assists	**Roel van Overbeek**	329
Steals	**Roel van Overbeek**	94
Blocks	Roel Aarts	41
Three-point field goals	Sander Hollanders	141
