= 2019–20 Feyenoord Basketball season =

Feyenoord Basketball
2019–20 season
- Chairman: Chiel den Dunnen
- Head coach: Toon van Helfteren
- Arena: Topsportcentrum
- Dutch Basketball League: 5th place (cancelled due to the COVID-19 pandemic)
- Basketball Cup: Quarterfinalist
Home	Away	Third
- All statistics correct as of 10 February 2020.

The 2019–20 Feyenoord Basketball season was the 66th season in the existence of the club. The club played in the Dutch Basketball League (DBL) and NBB Cup. The season was cancelled in March due to the COVID-19 pandemic.

It was the second season the team was known as Feyenoord Basketball and the first season under head coach Toon van Helfteren. On 15 April 2019, Van Helfteren signed a two-year contract with Feyenoord.

This season the team was named Zeeuw & Zeeuw Feyenoord for sponsorship reasons.

== Players ==
=== Squad information ===
Feyenoord roster
Players
Coaches

Pos.	No.	Nat.	Name	Ht.	Wt.	Age
SF	0	(Netherlands)	Lamba, Mert	1.99 m (6 ft 6 in)		26 – 1 January 2000
PG	2	(Netherlands)	Latinovic, Pavle	1.85 m (6 ft 1 in)		26 – 1 July 2000
PG	3	(North Macedonia)	Jordanovski, Andrej	1.83 m (6 ft 0 in)		26 – 4 January 2000
PG	4	(United States)	Snider, Quentin	1.88 m (6 ft 2 in)	79 kg (174 lb)	30 – 14 February 1996
PG	5	(Netherlands)	Bruining, Mack	1.88 m (6 ft 2 in)		29 – 4 July 1997
F	6	(Netherlands)	Stolk, Coen	1.95 m (6 ft 5 in)	92 kg (203 lb)	29 – 26 June 1997
PG	8	(Netherlands)	de Pree, Raidell	1.96 m (6 ft 5 in)	87 kg (192 lb)	28 – 17 November 1997
SF	7	(Netherlands)	Vis, Tommie	1.96 m (6 ft 5 in)		26 – 16 September 2000
PF	9	(Netherlands)	Brandwijk, Willem	2.06 m (6 ft 9 in)	102 kg (225 lb)	31 – 31 July 1995
G/F	10	(Netherlands)	Kok, Michael	1.92 m (6 ft 4 in)		34 – 19 September 1991
F/C	11	(Netherlands)	van der List, Jeroen	2.13 m (7 ft 0 in)	109 kg (240 lb)	36 – 9 December 1989
F	13	(Netherlands)	Hirz, Max	1.94 m (6 ft 4 in)		27 – 25 July 1999
C	33	(United States)	Lawton, Austin	2.04 m (6 ft 8 in)	93 kg (205 lb)	30 – 26 July 1996
G/F	32	(United States)	Woods, Keyshawn	1.90 m (6 ft 3 in)	93 kg (205 lb)	30 – 28 January 1996

Head coach

- (Netherlands) Toon van Helfteren

Assistant coach(es)

- (Netherlands) Jan Stalman

Team manager

- (Netherlands) Hesley Matroos

Legend

- (C) Team captain
- (DP) Development player
- (I) Import player
- Injured

- Roster
Updated: 4 September 2019

Note: Flags indicate national team eligibility at FIBA-sanctioned events. Players may hold other non-FIBA nationalities not displayed.

=== Depth chart ===
Pos.	Starting 5	Bench
C	Austin Lawton
PF	Jeroen van der List
SF	Willem Brandwijk	Coen Stolk
SG	Keyshawn Woods	Michael Kok
PG	Quentin Snider	Mack Bruining

== Transactions ==
=== In ===
No.	Pos.	Nat.	Name	Age	Moving from		Type	Ends	Date	Source
9	PF	(Netherlands)	Willem Brandwijk	24	IUP Crimson Hawks	(United States)	Free	2020	2 July 2019	
33	C	(United States)	Austin Lawton	23	Claflin University	(United States)	Free	Undisclosed	5 August 2019	
32	G/F	(United States)	Keyshawn Woods	23	Ohio State University	(United States)	Free	Undisclosed	11 August 2019	
5	PG	(Netherlands)	Mack Bruining	22	Apollo Amsterdam	(Netherlands)	Free	Undisclosed	16 August 2019	
4	PG	(United States)	Quentin Snider	23	Imortal DC	(Portugal)	Free	Undisclosed	4 September 2019	
8	PG	(Netherlands)	Raidell de Pree	21	Boet Mataró	(Spain)	Free	Undisclosed	4 September 2019	
3	PG	(North Macedonia)	Andrej Jordanovski	19	Rabotnički	(North Macedonia)	Free	Undisclosed	1 September 2019	

=== Out ===
No.	Pos.	Nat.	Name	Age	Moving to		Type	Date	Source
4	F	(United States)	Justin Gordon	25	PS Karlsruhe Lions	(Germany)	End of contract	5 July 2019	
1	C	(Netherlands)	Robert Krabbendam	33	Retired		End of contract		
3	G	(Netherlands)	Sam van Dijk	22			End of contract		
7	G	(Italy)	Emanuele Montaguti	25			End of contract		
9	SG	(Netherlands)	Ties Theeuwkens	34	Grasshoppers	(Netherlands)	End of contract		
13	F	(Netherlands)	Rens van Ravensteijn	24			End of contract		

== Pre-season ==
Feyenoord began its pre-season on 26 August 2019.

Win Loss

26 August 2019 1	Feyenoord (Netherlands)	51–44	(Netherlands) CobraNova	Rotterdam
				Arena: Topsportcentrum Rotterdam

28 August 2019 2	Feyenoord (Netherlands)	85–49	(Netherlands) Grasshoppers	Rotterdam
		Report		Arena: Topsportcentrum Rotterdam; Attendance: 700

31 August 2019 3	Landstede Hammers (Netherlands)	78–58	(Netherlands) Feyenoord	Urk

4 September 2019 4	Donar (Netherlands)	89–42	(Netherlands) Feyenoord	Groningen
	Pts: Williams Jr. 18	Report	Pts: Stolk 12	Arena: MartiniPlaza

6 September 2019 5	Feyenoord (Netherlands)	63–76	(Belgium) Kangoeroes Mechelen	Rotterdam
	Pts: Woods 20	Report		Arena: Topsportcentrum

8 September 2019 6	Limburg United (Belgium)	95–56	(Netherlands) Feyenoord	Houthalen

12 September 2019 7	BAL (Netherlands)	48–54	(Netherlands) Feyenoord	Weert
				Arena: Boshoven

19 September 2019 8	Feyenoord (Netherlands)	69–73	(Netherlands) Den Helder Suns	Rotterdam
				Arena: Topsportcentrum Rotterdam

22 September 2019 10	Aris Leeuwarden (Netherlands)	58–74	(Netherlands) Feyenoord	Leeuwarden
		Report		Arena: Kalverdijkje

== Dutch Basketball League ==
=== Regular season ===
Game	Date	Venue	Opponents	Result	High points	High rebounds	High assists
1	28 September 2019	H	ZZ Leiden	79–82	Snider 20	Lawton 9	Woods 6
2	8 October 2019	H	Donar	103–93	Snider 28	Woods 7	Snider 9
3	12 October 2019	A	Apollo Amsterdam	61–70	Woods 17	Woods 9	Woods 5
4	19 October 2019	H	Aris Leeuwarden	98–62	Van der List 19	Lawton 8	Snider 8
5	27 October 2019	H	Den Helder Suns	91–74	Van der List 23	Lawton 10	Snider & Lawton 5
6	2 November 2019	A	BAL	69–82	Quentin Snider (22)	Willem Brandwijk (11)	Keyshawn Woods (5)
7	10 November 2019	A	Donar	74–68	Quentin Woods (27)	Austin Lawton (7)	Keyshawn Woods (6)
8	17 November 2019	H	Heroes Den Bosch				
9	24 November 2019	H	Apollo Amsterdam				
10	28 November 2019	A	Den Helder Suns				
11	8 December 2019	A	Landstede Hammers				
12	12 December 2019	H	BAL				
13	15 December 2019	A	Aris Leeuwarden				
