= 2020–21 Feyenoord Basketball season =

Feyenoord Basketball
2020–21 season
- Chairman: Chiel den Dunnen
- Head coach: Toon van Helfteren (2nd season)
- Arena: Topsportcentrum
- DBL: 5th
- Playoffs: Quarterfinalist
- Basketball Cup: Semifinalist
Home	Away	Third
- All statistics correct as of 10 February 2020.

The 2020–21 Feyenoord Basketball season is the 67th season in the existence of the club and the 3rd as Feyenoord Basketball. Competing in the Dutch Basketball League (DBL) and NBB Cup, the club finished 5th in the DBL standings. Unfortunately, Feyenoord was defeated by Landstede Hammers in the quarterfinals.

== Roster ==
Feyenoord roster
Players
Coaches

Pos.	No.	Nat.	Name	Ht.	Age
PF	0	(Lithuania)	Mikalauskas, Arunas	2.04 m (6 ft 8 in)	27 – 14 September 1997
G	2	(Netherlands)	Latinovic, Pavle	1.85 m (6 ft 1 in)	24 – 1 July 2000
F	3	(Netherlands)	Van Lierop, Dante	1.97 m (6 ft 6 in)	25 – 4 January 2000
G	4	(Suriname)	Wip, Yamill	1.89 m (6 ft 2 in)	27 – 30 November 1997
PG	5	(Netherlands)	Bruining, Mack	1.88 m (6 ft 2 in)	27 – 4 July 1997
F	6	(Netherlands)	Stolk, Coen	1.95 m (6 ft 5 in)	27 – 26 June 1997
F	7	(Netherlands)	Kherrazi, Mohamed	2.00 m (6 ft 7 in)	34 – 29 June 1990
F	8	(Netherlands)	de Pree, Raidell	1.96 m (6 ft 5 in)	27 – 17 November 1997
F	9	(United States)	Davis, Juan	2.01 m (6 ft 7 in)	28 – 15 August 1996
PG	10	(United States)	Brushier, Dalven	1.90 m (6 ft 3 in)	26 – 23 April 1998
F/C	11	(Netherlands)	van der List, Jeroen	2.13 m (7 ft 0 in)	35 – 9 December 1989
F	13	(Netherlands)	Hirs, Max	1.92 m (6 ft 4 in)	25 – 25 July 1999
F	32	(Netherlands)	Vis, Tommie	1.96 m (6 ft 5 in)	24 – 16 September 2000
PG	33	(Belgium)	Kanda-Kanyinda, Ordane	1.84 m (6 ft 0 in)	28 – 9 September 1996

Head coach

- (Netherlands) Toon van Helfteren

Assistant coach(es)

- (Netherlands) Mitchell Liesveld

Physiotherapist(s)

- (Netherlands) Yannick Verweij
- (Netherlands) Yannick Spruit Bleeker

Team manager

- (Netherlands) Hesley Matroos

Legend

- (C) Team captain
- (DP) Development player
- (I) Import player
- Injured

- Roster
Updated: 5 October 2020

Note: Flags indicate national team eligibility at FIBA-sanctioned events. Players may hold other non-FIBA nationalities not displayed.

== Transactions ==
=== In ===
No.	Pos.	Nat.	Name	Age	Moving from		Type	Ends	Date	Source
33	PG	(Belgium)	Ordane Kanda-Kanyndia	23	Heroes Den Bosch	(Netherlands)	Free	Undisclosed	17 July 2020	
0	SF	(Lithuania)	Arūnas Mikalauskas	22	Aris Leeuwarden	(Netherlands)	Free	Undisclosed	20 July 2020	
10	PG	(United States)	Dalven Brushier	24	Western Oregon University	(United States)	Free	Undisclosed	16 August 2020	
9	F	(United States)	Juan Davis	24	Kauhajoki Karhu	(Finland)	Free	Undisclosed	24 August 2020	
4	F	(Suriname)	Yamill Wip	22	Lee College	(United States)	Free	Undisclosed	24 August 2020	

=== Out ===
No.	Pos.	Nat.	Name	Age	Moving to		Type	Date	Source
32	SF	(United States)	Keyshawn Woods	24	Twarde Pierniki Toruń	(Poland)	End of contract	5 July 2020	
9	PF	(Netherlands)	Willem Brandwijk	25	Donar	(Netherlands)	End of contract	7 July 2020	
3	PG	(North Macedonia)	Andrej Jordanovski	20			End of contract		
10	G	(Netherlands)	Michael Kok	29			Retired		
4	PG	(United States)	Quentin Snider	24			End of contract		
7	SF	(Netherlands)	Tommie Vis	20			End of contract		
2	PG	(Netherlands)	Pavle Latinovic	20			End of contract		
13	F	(Netherlands)	Max Hirz	20			End of contract		
33	C	(United States)	Austin Lawton	24			End of contract		

== Individual awards ==
- DBL All-Defense Team: Juan Davis
