= 2019–20 Donar (basketball club) season =

Donar
2019–20 season
- Chairman: Jannes Stokroos
- Head coach: Erik Braal
- Arena: MartiniPlaza
- Dutch Basketball League: 2nd place
- NBB Cup: Finalist
- Basketball Champions League: Qualifying Round
- All statistics correct as of 1 July 2019.

The 2019–20 Donar season was the 48th season in the existence of the club. The club will play in the Dutch Basketball League (DBL) and NBB Cup. Donar also played the qualifying rounds of the Basketball Champions League. It was the fifth season under head coach Erik Braal.

On 12 March 2020, the season was postponed until 31 March because of the COVID-19 pandemic. On 14 March, the DBL announced to suspend the competition to at least 2 May. On 20 March, the DBL cancelled the rest of the season while naming no champion.

== Players ==
=== Squad information ===
2019–20 Donar roster
Players
Coaches

Pos.	No.	Nat.	Name	Ht.	Wt.	Age
SG	0	(United States)	Williams Jr., Matt (I)	1.96 m (6 ft 5 in)	95 kg (209 lb)	33 – 14 October 1993
PF	1	(United States)	Thomas, Donte (I)	2.01 m (6 ft 7 in)	102 kg (225 lb)	30 – 6 May 1996
G	3	(Netherlands)	Adetunji, Sheyi	1.90 m (6 ft 3 in)		27 – 11 September 1999
PG	5	(Netherlands)	Williams, Leon	1.89 m (6 ft 2 in)	75 kg (165 lb)	35 – 25 July 1991
G	7	(Netherlands)	Hoexum, Yoeri	1.86 m (6 ft 1 in)		27 – 5 February 1999
SF	8	(United States)	Dourisseau, Jason (I)	1.96 m (6 ft 5 in)	91 kg (201 lb)	42 – 7 December 1983
G	9	(Netherlands)	de Vries, Jef	1.90 m (6 ft 3 in)		26 – 16 May 2000
G/F	11	(Netherlands)	Hammink, Shane	2.01 m (6 ft 7 in)	95 kg (209 lb)	32 – 22 July 1994
PG	12	(United States)	Love, Carrington (I)	1.86 m (6 ft 1 in)	78 kg (172 lb)	32 – 6 January 1994
C	14	(Netherlands)	Koenis, Thomas (C)	2.10 m (6 ft 11 in)	103 kg (227 lb)	36 – 11 December 1989
F/C	25	(United States)	Smith, Andrew (I)	2.06 m (6 ft 9 in)	100 kg (220 lb)	33 – 14 December 1992
F	28	(Netherlands)	Sedoc, Jeffrey	1.95 m (6 ft 5 in)		28 – 28 April 1998
C	33	(Australia)	McCarthy, Matt (I)	2.06 m (6 ft 9 in)	105 kg (231 lb)	30 – 30 July 1996
G	42	(United States)	Taylor, Vernon (I)	1.91 m (6 ft 3 in)	85 kg (187 lb)	39 – 15 February 1987

Head coach

(Netherlands) Erik Braal

Assistant coach(es)

(Netherlands) Meindert van Veen

Legend

- (C) Team captain
- (DP) Development player
- (I) Import player
- Injured

- Roster

Note: Flags indicate national team eligibility at FIBA-sanctioned events. Players may hold other non-FIBA nationalities not displayed.

=== Players with multiple nationalities ===
- (United States) (Netherlands) Jason Dourisseau

=== Depth chart ===
Pos.	Starting 5	Bench 1	Bench 2
C	Thomas Koenis	Matt McCarthy
PF	Donte Thomas	Andrew Smith	Jeffrey Sedoc
SF	Shane Hammink	Jason Dourisseau	Sheyi Adetunji
SG	Matt Williams Jr.	Vernon Taylor	Yoeri Hoexum
PG	Carrington Love	Leon Williams	Jef de Vries

=== Transactions ===
==== In ====
No.	Pos.	Nat.	Name	Age	Moving from		Type	Ends	Date	Source
5	G	(Netherlands)	Leon Williams	27	Den Helder Suns	(Netherlands)	Free	2021	25 June 2019	
1	PF	(United States)	Donte Thomas	23	KTP	(Finland)	Free	2020	4 July 2019	
12	PG	(United States)	Carrington Love	25	Kangoeroes Mechelen	(Belgium)	Free	2020	15 July 2019	
0	SG	(United States)	Matt Williams Jr.	25	Kymis	(Greece)	Free	2020	15 July 2019	
33	C	(Australia)	Matt McCarthy	23	San Francisco Dons	(United States)	Free	2020	2 August 2019	
6	F	(United States)	Deshawn Freeman	25	Worcester Wolves	(United Kingdom)	Free	2020	7 August 2019	
42	G	(United States)	Vernon Taylor	32	Keravnos	(Cyprus)	Free	2020	15 October 2019	
25	PF	(United States)	Drew Smith	26	Södertälje	(Sweden)	Free	2020	29 November 2019	

==== Out ====
No.	Pos.	Nat.	Name	Age	Moving to		Type	Date	Source
15	C	(Netherlands)	Rienk Mast	18	Bradley Braves	(United States)	End of contract	21 January 2019	
12	PG	(Netherlands)	Tim Hoeve	21	Aris Leeuwarden	(Netherlands)	End of contract	24 June 2019	
0	F	(United States)	Grant Sitton	26	Rostock Seawolves	(Germany)	End of contract	24 June 2019	
33	C	(Croatia)	Drago Pašalić	35	ZZ Leiden	(Netherlands)	End of contract	13 August 2019	
44	G	(Netherlands)	Arvin Slagter	33	–		End of contract	24 June 2019	
33	G	(Netherlands)	Sean Cunningham	32	–		End of contract	24 June 2019	
5	SG	(United States)	Teddy Gipson	39	–		End of contract	24 June 2019	
34	PG	(United States)	Lance Jeter	31	–		End of contract	24 June 2019	
6	PF	(United States)	Deshawn Freeman	25	Södertälje	(Sweden)	Undisclosed	29 November 2019	

== Preseason ==
Win Loss

28 August 2019 1	Donar (Netherlands)	57–81	(Belgium) Filou Oostende	Groningen
		Report		Arena: MartiniPlaza; Attendance: 0

30 August 2019 2	De Groene Uilen (Netherlands)	46–84	(Netherlands) Donar	Bedum
		Report		Arena: De Beemden; Attendance: 700

1 September 2019 3	Kangoeroes Mechelen (Belgium)	60–77	(Netherlands) Donar	Mechelen
	Pts: Fletcher 17	Report	Pts: Love 20

4 September 2019 4	Donar (Netherlands)	89–42	(Netherlands) Feyenoord	Groningen
	Pts: Williams Jr. 18	Report	Pts: Stolk 12	Arena: MartiniPlaza

7 September 2019 5	Bakken Bears (Denmark)	70–78	(Netherlands) Donar	Aarhus
		Report	Pts: Love 19; Rebs: Thomas 11; Asts: Love 4	Arena: Vejlby-Risskov Hallen

9 September 2019 6	EWE Baskets Oldenburg (Germany)	89–83	(Netherlands) Donar	Oldenburg
		Report		Attendance: 0

13 September 2019 7	Donar (Netherlands)	85–60	(Germany) Phoenix Hagen	Veendam
	Pts: Williams Jr. 20	Report		Arena: Wildervanckhal

== Dutch Basketball League ==
=== Regular season ===
2 October 2019 1	Donar	100–63	Apollo Amsterdam	Groningen
19:30	Scoring by quarter: 23-13, 27-23, 28-11, 22-16
	Pts: Hammink 21; Rebs: McCarthy 9 Asts: Williams Jr., Carrington Love 6	Report	Pts: Berend Weijs 20; Rebs: Berend Weijs, Jesse Markusse 7 Asts: Keyshawn Bottelier 7	Arena: MartiniPlaza

5 October 2019 2	Donar	91–75	Heroes Den Bosch	Groningen
	Scoring by quarter: 26-14, 22-11, 17-28, 26-22
	Pts: Williams Jr. 35; Rebs: Shane Hammink 11; Asts: Hammink, Love 4	Report	Pts: Wilson 22; Rebs: Van der Mars 9 Asts: Clarance 4	Arena: MartiniPlaza; Attendance: 3,200

8 October 2019 3	Feyenoord	103–93	Donar	Rotterdam
	Scoring by quarter: 32-15, 31-25, 22-25, 17-28
	Pts: Snider 28; Rebs: Woods 7 Asts: Snider 9	Report	Pts: Williams Jr., Thomas 23; Rebs: Koenis 8 Asts: Love 8	Arena: Topsportcentrum Rotterdam

13 October 2019 4	Landstede Hammers	77–70	Donar	Zwolle
	Scoring by quarter: 25-21, 12-21, 18-13, 22-15
	Pts: Johnson 22; Rebs: Kherrazi 11; Asts: Dorsey-Walker, Kherrazi 4		Pts: Thomas 20; Rebs: Thomas 7 Asts: Love 7	Arena: Landstede Sportcentrum

19 October 2019 5	Den Helder Suns	72–100	Donar	Den Helder
	Pts: van der Vuurst de Vries 18; Rebs: Brussen 8 Asts: Gorissen, Miller 3	Report	Pts: Thomas 20; Rebs: Three players 5 Asts: Hammink, Love 4	Arena: Sporthal Sportlaan

26 October 2019 6	Aris Leeuwarden	70–103	Donar	Leeuwarden
	Pts: Idowu 22; Rebs: Koopmans & Idowu 7 Asts: Koopmans 6	Boxscore	Pts: Thomas 26; Rebs: Thomas 8 Asts: Love 9	Arena: Kalverdijkje

10 November 2019 7	Donar	74–68	Feyenoord	Groningen
	Pts: Thomas 16; Rebs: Thomas 11; Asts: Love 5	Boxscore	Pts: Snider 27; Rebs: Lawton 7 Asts: Woods	Arena: MartiniPlaza; Attendance: 3,640

16 November 2019 8	Apollo Amsterdam	71–86	Donar	Amsterdam
	Scoring by quarter: 19–25, 22–21, 17–21, 13–19
	Pts: Vitkovic 19; Rebs: Vitkovic & Weijs 7 Asts: Cannefax 8	Boxscore	Pts: Thomas & Dourisseau 17; Rebs: Koenis 8 Asts: Love 8	Arena: Apollohal

23 November 2019 9	ZZ Leiden	72–80	Donar	Leiden
	Pts: J. Williams 22; Rebs: J. Williams 5 Asts: Persons 8	Boxscore	Pts: Love 19; Rebs: Koenis 13; Asts: Love 9	Arena: Vijf Meihal

28 November 2019 10	Heroes Den Bosch	65–59	Donar	's-Hertogenbosch
	Pts: Wilson 16; Rebs: Caruso 7 Asts: Chambers 6	Boxscore	Pts: Thomas 13; Rebs: Thomas 9 Asts: Love & Hammink 4	Arena: Maaspoort

7 December 2019 11	Donar	vs.	BAL	Groningen
				Arena: MartiniPlaza

14 December 2019 12	Den Helder Suns	vs.	Donar	Den Helder
				Arena: Sporthaal Sportlaan

== Basketball Champions League ==
=== First qualifying round ===
17 September 2019	Benfica (Portugal)	95–65	(Netherlands) Donar	Lisbon
	Pts: Betinho 21; Rebs: Hallman 10; Asts: Murry 8	Report	Pts: Thomas 16; Rebs: Thomas 7 Asts: Thomas, Love 5	Arena: Pavilhão Fidelidade

20 September 2019	Donar (Netherlands)	76–66 (141–161 agg.)	(Portugal) Benfica	Groningen
19:30
	Pts: Love 16; Rebs: McCarthy 7 Asts: Love 6	Report	Pts: Murry 21; Rebs: Downs 7 Asts: Downs 4	Arena: MartiniPlaza; Attendance: 3,500

== FIBA Europe Cup ==
Pos	Team	Pld	W	L	PF	PA	PD	Pts	Qualification
1	(Turkey) Pınar Karşıyaka	6	5	1	496	410	+86	11	Advance to second round
2	(Belgium) Spirou	6	3	3	473	467	+6	9	Advance to second round
3	(Netherlands) Donar	6	2	4	386	454	−68	8	
4	(Belgium) Phoenix Brussels	6	2	4	468	492	−24	8	

Source: FIBA Europe Cup

=== Regular season ===
22 October 2019 1	Donar (Netherlands)	75–56	(Belgium) Phoenix Brussels	Groningen
19:30	Scoring by quarter: 21–19, 17–14, 27–21, 10–9
	Pts: Thomas 26; Rebs: Koenis 11; Asts: Koenis 7 PIR: Thomas 28	Boxscore	Pts: Fairell 18; Rebs: Cumberbatch 12; Asts: Loubry, Cumberbatch 5	Arena: MartiniPlaza

30 October 2019 2	Pınar Karşıyaka (Turkey)	77–57	(Netherlands) Donar	İzmir
18:00	Scoring by quarter: 16–11, 17–16, 23–12, 21–18
	Pts: Taylor 16; Rebs: Birsen 8 Asts: Taylor 4 PIR: Bitim 18	Boxscore	Pts: Hammink 12; Rebs: Williams Jr. 6 Asts: Three players 2 PIR: Hammink 12	Arena: Mustafa Kemal Atatürk Karşıyaka Sport Hall

6 November 2019 3	Spirou (Belgium)	87–56	(Netherlands) Donar	Charleroi
19:30	Scoring by quarter: 20–19, 22–13, 23–9, 22–15
	Pts: Beane 33; Rebs: Sharma 8 Asts: Libert 5 PIR: Beane 34	Report	Pts: Freeman 13; Rebs: Koenis 7 Asts: Love, Taylor 2 PIR: Freeman 10	Arena: Spiroudome

13 November 2019 4	Phoenix Brussels (Belgium)	70–72	(Netherlands) Donar	Brussels
	Scoring by quarter: 28–18, 23–22, 15–19, 4–13
	Pts: Foerts 18; Rebs: Cumberbatch 13; Asts: Cumberbatch, Augustin-Farrell 4 PIR: Cumberbatch 20	Boxscore	Pts: Williams Jr. 20; Rebs: Love 8 Asts: Love 7 PIR: Williams Jr. 24	Arena: Sports Complex Neder-Over-Heembeek

20 November 2019 5	Donar (Netherlands)	62–79	(Turkey) Pınar Karşıyaka	Groningen
19:30	Scoring by quarter: 16-12, 15-19, 16-20, 15-28
	Pts: Hammink 15; Rebs: Williams Jr. 5 Asts: Koenis 3 PIR: Hammink 18	Boxscore	Pts: M'Baye 20; Rebs: Birsen 6 Asts: Triche 3 PIR: Morgan & M'Baye 17	Arena: MartiniPlaza

27 November 2019 6	Donar (Netherlands)	64–78	(Belgium) Spirou	Groningen
19:30	Scoring by quarter: 23-18, 14-11, 19-20, 8-29
	Pts: Thomas 15; Rebs: Freeman 9 Asts: Love 6 PIR: Freeman 14	Boxscore	Pts: Beane 28; Rebs: Schoepen 7 Asts: Libert 7 PIR: Beane 19	Arena: MartiniPlaza; Attendance: 3,300

== Statistics ==
Legend
GP	Games played	GS	Games started	MPG	Minutes per game	RPG	Rebounds per game
APG	Assists per game	SPG	Steals per game	BPG	Blocks per game	PPG	Points per game
FG%	Field-goal percentage	3P%	3-point field-goal percentage	FT%	Free-throw percentage	TO	Turnovers per game
PF	Fouls per game		Team leader		League leader

=== Dutch Basketball League ===
Player	GP	GS	MPG	FG%	3P%	FT%	RPG	APG	SPG	BPG	PPG
Donte Thomas	18		27.6	.556	.319	.725	7.4	2.6	1.0	0.6	15.7
Matt Williams Jr.	21		27.2	.437	.424	.761	3.2	1.7	0.7	0.1	14.6
Carrington Love	22		29.3	.463	.304	.667	3.9	5.8	2.3	0.0	13.4
Shane Hammink	19		26.5	.440	.349	.797	4.5	2.7	1.2	0.4	11.0
Andrew Smith	10		20.1	.520	.400	.429	5.8	1.2	1.0	1.0	9.6
Vernon Taylor	16		22.0	.423	.327	.826	2.6	2.3	1.3	0.1	8.1
Thomas Koenis	20		24.3	.570	.190	.515	6.5	3.0	1.2	0.4	8.0
Matt McCarthy	22		18.3	.532	.360	.765	5.3	0.7	0.5	0.4	7.7
Jason Dourisseau	15		21.3	.494	.405	.812	2.0	1.6	0.7	0.3	7.3
Deshawn Freeman	9		16.2	.475	.000	.714	4.0	1.1	0.7	0.0	5.3
Leon Williams	12		15.8	.487	.200	.714	2.0	2.0	0.7	0.1	3.8
Sheyi Adetunji	7		5.1	.500	.200	.000	0.1	0.4	0.3	0.0	1.9
Yoeri Hoexum	5		3.9	.500	.000	.667	0.4	0.4	0.0	0.0	1.6
Jef de Vries	7		3.6	.667	.667	.000	0.6	0.3	0.1	0.0	0.9
Jeffrey Sedoc	2		1.5	.000	.000	.000	0.5	0.0	0.0	0.0	0.0
