= 2021–22 Feyenoord Basketball season =

Feyenoord Basketball
2021–22 season
- Chairman: Chiel den Dunnen
- Head coach: Toon van Helfteren (3rd season)
- Arena: Topsportcentrum
- DBL: 10th of 21
- Playoffs: National: Quarterfinalist; BNXT: Third Round
- Basketball Cup: Quarterfinalist
Home	Away

The 2021–22 Feyenoord Basketball season was the 68th season in the existence of the club and the 4th as Feyenoord Basketball. It was the first season the club played in the BNXT League.

== Roster ==
Feyenoord roster
Players
Coaches

Pos.	No.	Nat.	Name	Ht.	Age
PG	3	(Belgium)	Foerts, Niels	1.85 m (6 ft 1 in)	28 – 17 October 1997
PG	4	(Netherlands)	Sow, Isai (DP)	1.85 m (6 ft 1 in)	24 – 17 September 2002
F	6	(Netherlands)	Stolk, Coen	1.95 m (6 ft 5 in)	29 – 26 June 1997
G	7	(Netherlands)	Kusten, Lamar	1.87 m (6 ft 2 in)	25 – 17 September 2001
SF	8	(Netherlands)	Metz, Philip	1.99 m (6 ft 6 in)	23 – 6 October 2002
F	10	(Netherlands)	Vis, Tommie	1.96 m (6 ft 5 in)	26 – 16 September 2000
F/C	11	(Netherlands)	van der List, Jeroen	2.13 m (7 ft 0 in)	36 – 9 December 1989
SG	12	(Netherlands)	Haddad, Khalid	1.90 m (6 ft 3 in)	27 – 29 May 1999
PF	15	(Netherlands)	Wellian, Chaed	2.03 m (6 ft 8 in)	34 – 27 August 1992
C	17	(Netherlands)	Bieshaar, Terrence	2.08 m (6 ft 10 in)	29 – 28 July 1997
SG	23	(United States)	Jones, CJ	1.96 m (6 ft 5 in)	28 – 9 February 1998
F	34	(Netherlands)	Buijs, Pieter (injured) (DP)	2.04 m (6 ft 8 in)	24 – 25 February 2002
SF	41	(United States)	Rhodes, Jarrid	1.95 m (6 ft 5 in)	30 – 15 October 1995

Head coach

- (Netherlands) Toon van Helfteren

Assistant coach(es)

- (Netherlands) Gertjan van der Linden

Physiotherapist(s)

- (Netherlands) Yannick Verweij
- (Netherlands) Yannick Spruit Bleeker

Team manager

- (Netherlands) Hesley Matroos

Legend

- (C) Team captain
- (DP) Development player
- (I) Import player
- Injured

- Roster
Updated: 19 June 2022

Note: Flags indicate national team eligibility at FIBA-sanctioned events. Players may hold other non-FIBA nationalities not displayed.

=== Depth chart ===
Pos.	Starting 5	Bench 1	Bench 2
C	Terrence Bieshaar	Jeroen van der List
PF	Coen Stolk	Chaed Wellian
SF	Jarrid Rhodes	Philip Metz
SG	CJ Jones
PG	Anthony Collins	Niels Foerts	Isai Sow

== Transactions ==
=== In ===
No.	Pos.	Nat.	Name	Age	Moving from		Type	Ends	Date	Source
3	PG	(Belgium)	Niels Foerts	24	Phoenix Brussels	(Belgium)	Free	2024	5 July 2021	
23	SG	(United States)	CJ Jones	23	Middle Tennessee (NCAA)	(United States)	College rookie	2022	3 August 2021	
41	F	(United States)	Jarrid Rhodes	24	Missouri State (NCAA)	(United States)	College rookie	2022	3 August 2021	
2	PG	(United States)	Anthony Collins	29	Hopsi Polzela	(Slovenia)	Free	2022	11 September 2021	
9	F/C	(United States)	Jonathan Holton	29	BC Kalev/Cramo	(Estonia)	Free	2022	11 September 2021	
15	PF	(Netherlands)	Chaed Wellian	29	EPG Baskets Koblenz	(Germany)	Free	2022	16 December 2021	
17	C	(Netherlands)	Terrence Bieshaar	24	Oberwart Gunners	(Austria)	Free	2022	14 February 2022	

=== Out ===
No.	Pos.	Nat.	Name	Age	Moving to		Type	Date	Source
0	F	(Lithuania)	Arūnas Mikalauskas	24	ZZ Leiden	(Netherlands)	End of contract	1 July 2022	
3	G	(Suriname)	Yamill Wip	24			End of contract		
3	G	(Netherlands)	Raidell de Pree	23			End of contract		
9	F	(United States)	Juan Davis	23	MZT Skopje	(North Macedonia)	End of contract		
10	PG	(United States)	Dalvin Brushier	23			End of contract		
33	G	(Belgium)	Ordane Kanda-Kanyinda	25			End of contract		
