= 2022–23 Feyenoord Basketball season =

69th Feyenoord Basketball season

Feyenoord Basketball
2022–23 season
- Chairman: Chiel den Dunnen
- Head coach: Toon van Helfteren (4th season)
- Arena: Topsportcentrum
- BNXT League: TBD
- Basketball Cup: TBD
Home	Away

The 2022–23 Feyenoord Basketball season is the 69th season in the existence of the club and the 5th as Feyenoord Basketball.

On June 10, 2022, coach Toon van Helfteren extended his contract.

== Roster ==
Feyenoord roster
Players
Coaches

Pos.	No.	Nat.	Name	Ht.	Age
PG	4	(Netherlands)	Sow, Isai (DP)	1.85 m (6 ft 1 in)	22 – 17 September 2002
SF	8	(Netherlands)	Metz, Philip	1.99 m (6 ft 6 in)	22 – 6 October 2002
F	10	(Netherlands)	Vis, Tommie	1.96 m (6 ft 5 in)	24 – 16 September 2000
F/C	11	(Netherlands)	van der List, Jeroen	2.13 m (7 ft 0 in)	35 – 9 December 1989
SG	12	(Netherlands)	Haddad, Khalid	1.90 m (6 ft 3 in)	26 – 29 May 1999
PF	15	(Netherlands)	Wellian, Chaed	2.03 m (6 ft 8 in)	32 – 27 August 1992
C	17	(Netherlands)	Bieshaar, Terrence	2.08 m (6 ft 10 in)	27 – 28 July 1997
F	34	(Netherlands)	Buijs, Pieter (injured) (DP)	2.04 m (6 ft 8 in)	23 – 25 February 2002
PG	–	(United States)	Reynolds Jr., Shavar	1.88 m (6 ft 2 in)	27 – 11 May 1998
SG	–	(United States)	Beckton Jr., Stacy	1.93 m (6 ft 4 in)
SF	–	(United States)	Diggs, Trey	1.98 m (6 ft 6 in)
F/C	–	(Netherlands)	de Vreede, Ivo	2.10 m (6 ft 11 in)	26 – 11 May 1999
F	–	(Croatia)	Obad, Marijan	2.02 m (6 ft 8 in)	26 – 2 September 1998

Head coach

- (Netherlands) Toon van Helfteren

Assistant coach(es)

- (Netherlands) Michael Kok
- (Netherlands) Gertjan van der Linden

Physiotherapist(s)

- (Netherlands) Yannick Verweij
- (Netherlands) Yannick Spruit Bleeker

Team manager

- (Netherlands) Hesley Matroos

Legend

- (C) Team captain
- (DP) Development player
- (I) Import player
- Injured

- Roster
Updated: September 10, 2022

Note: Flags indicate national team eligibility at FIBA-sanctioned events. Players may hold other non-FIBA nationalities not displayed.

=== Depth chart ===
Pos.	Starting 5	Bench
C	Terrence Bieshaar	Jeroen van der List
PF	Marijan Obad	Chaed Wellian
SF	Trey Diggs	Ivo de Vreede
SG	Stacy Beckton Jr.
PG	Shavar Reynolds Jr.	Isai Sow

== Transactions ==
=== In ===
No.	Pos.	Nat.	Name	Age	Moving from		Type	Ends	Date	Source
	F	(Croatia)	Marijan Obad	24	BAL	(Netherlands)	Free	2023	June 21, 2022	
	F/C	(Netherlands)	Ivo de Vreede	23	Spirou	(Belgium)	Free	2023	July 5, 2022	
	PG	(United States)	Shavar Reynolds Jr.	24	Monmouth (NCAA)	(United States)	College rookie	2023	July 8, 2022	
	PG	(United States)	Stacy Beckton	23	American	(United States)	College rookie	2023	July 13, 2022	
	F	(United States)	Trey Diggs	23	Bowling Green (NCAA)	(Austria)	College rookie	2023	July 26, 2022	

=== Out ===
No.	Pos.	Nat.	Name	Age	Moving to		Type	Date	Source
6	F	(Netherlands)	Coen Stolk	25	Landstede Hammers	(Netherlands)	End of contract	June 9, 2022	
3	G	(Belgium)	Niels Foerts	24			End of contract		
23	SG	(United States)	CJ Jones	24			End of contract		
41	SF	(United States)	Jarrid Rhodes	26			End of contract		
