= Gaëlle Bouzin =

Belgian basketball player and coach

Landstede Hammers
- Position: Head coach
- League: BNXT League

Personal information
- Born: 23 October 1985 (age 41)
- Coaching career: 2024–present

Career history
- 2024-present: Landstede Hammers

Career highlights
- As a head coach: Dutch supercup winner (2026); Dutch championship winner (2026)

Gaëlle Bouzin (born 23 October 1985) is a Belgian professional basketball coach. She was the first ever female headcoach ever in the BNXT League when she became head coach of the Landstede Hammers in 2024. She is currently still head coach of Landstede Hammers of the BNXT League.

== Coaching career ==
After being assistent coach for Filou Oostende under the highly successful Dario Gjergja, winning 5 Belgian championships and a Belgian Cup, Bouzin was offered her first job as head coach by Landstede Hammers in the BNXT League for 2 seasons.

In her second season, she won the Dutch Championship from an underdog position after placing 5th in the standings. That made her the first Belgian coach and the first female head coach win to win a Dutch championship.

After her success in winning the Dutch Championship, she extended her contract with Landstede Hammers for another season. She immediately went on to win the Dutch supercup, beating the cup winner Donar by 70-62, earning her a second trophy as head coach.
