= Dalven =

Dalven is a surname and given name. Notable people with the name include:

== Surname ==
- Rae Dalven (1904–1992), American writer

== Given name ==
- Dalven Brushier (born 1998), American basketball player
