= 2015 Landstede Brose Tournament =

Tournament details
- Country: Netherlands
- Dates: 19–20 September 2015
- Teams: 4

Final positions
- Champions: (Germany) Fraport Skyliners
- Runner-up: (Germany) Brose Baskets
- Third place: (Turkey) Banvit
- Fourth place: (Netherlands) Landstede

The 2015 Landstede Brose Tournament was a friendly exhibition basketball tournament held in the Landstede Sportcentrum in Zwolle on September 19 and September 20, 2015. The tournament is sponsored by Brose Fahrzeugteile.

== Participants ==
Team
(Netherlands) Landstede Basketbal
(Germany) Brose Baskets
(Germany) Fraport Skyliners
(Turkey) Banvit

== Semifinals ==
September 19, 2015
16:30

Report

Landstede Basketbal (Netherlands)	54–96	(Germany) Brose Baskets

Landstede Sportcentrum

September 19, 2015
19:30

Report

Banvit (Turkey)	82–91	(Germany) Fraport Skyliners

Landstede Sportcentrum

== Final ==
September 20, 2015
19:30

Report

Fraport Skyliners (Germany)	83–75	(Germany) Brose Baskets

Landstede Sportcentrum

== Third place ==
September 20, 2015
16:30

Report

Banvit (Turkey)	92–75	(Netherlands) Landstede Basketbal

Landstede Sportcentrum
