= 2025–26 BNXT League =

- League: BNXT League
- Sport: Basketball
- Duration: 26 September 2025–9 May 2026 (Regular Season)
- Teams: 18

Regular season
- Season MVP: (United States) Dante Maddox Jr. (Okapi)
- Top scorer: (United States) Dante Maddox Jr. (Okapi)

National playoffs
- Belgian champions: Windrose Giants Antwerp (2nd title)
- Belgian runners-up: Filou Oostende
- Dutch champions: Landstede Hammers (2nd title)
- Dutch runners-up: ZZ Leiden

Finals
- Champions: Windrose Giants Antwerp (1st title)
- Runners-up: Filou Oostende

BNXT seasons
- ← 2024–25 2026–27 →

The 2025–26 BNXT League was the fifth season of the BNXT League, the highest professional basketball league in Belgium and the Netherlands. The season will start on 26 September 2025 and will finish with the playoffs in 2026.

The format is kept the same as the 2024-25 season with a round-robin regular season, in which each team will play one home game and one away game against each other team. The winner of the regular season will be crowned BNXT Champion. In addition, the top teams of each country will qualify for the national play-offs. The national play-offs decide which teams become the national champions.

== Competition formula ==
Round	Teams entering in this round
Regular season (18 teams)	10 Belgian teams; 8 Dutch teams; All teams play each other home and away; Bottom team relegated; The team that finishes the Regular Season at the top of the standings is crowned as the BNXT League champion.
National play-offs (14 teams)	Best 6 Dutch teams; Top two Dutch teams go directly to semifinals; Four other Dutch teams play in quarterfinals; Best 8 Belgian teams; All Belgian teams play in quarterfinals

== Teams ==
In the 2025–26 season, had a maximum of 18 spots for teams. QSTA United would be demoted based on the results of the 2024-25 season, but could however still apply for a license in case a different team failed to obtain a license. Therefore, all 19 teams from the 2024-25 season applied for a license. Initially, the license request from two teams, QSTA United and Den Helder Suns were rejected due to economic uncertainties. The teams received a month to make another request for a license. QSTA United opted not to make another application, having already accepted their demotion due to competitive results. The Suns reapplied and received their license a month later

The 2025-26 season will therefore consist of 10 Belgian teams and 8 Dutch teams.

=== Arenas and locations ===
Location of teams in the BNXT League

Note: Table lists in alphabetical order.

Club	Location	Venue	Capacity
Netherlands
BAL	Weert	Sporthal Boshoven	1,000
Den Helder Suns	Den Helder	Sporthal Quelderduijn	1,250
Donar	Groningen	MartiniPlaza	4,350
Heroes Den Bosch	's-Hertogenbosch	Maaspoort	2,800
Landstede Hammers	Zwolle	Landstede Sportcentrum	1,200
LWD Basket	Leeuwarden	Kalverdijkje	1,700
Rotterdam City Basketball	Rotterdam	Topsportcentrum Rotterdam	2,500
ZZ Leiden	Leiden	Vijf Meihal	2,000
Belgium
Antwerp Giants	Antwerp	Lotto Arena	5,218
Brussels Basketball	Brussels	Sports Complex Neder-Over-Heembeek	1,200
Kangoeroes Mechelen	Mechelen	Winketkaai	1,500
Kortrijk Spurs	Kortrijk	Sportcampus Lange Munte	2,400
Leuven Bears	Leuven	Sportoase	3,400
Limburg United	Hasselt	Alverberg Sporthal	1,730
Mons-Hainaut	Mons	Mons Arena	4,000
Okapi Aalst	Aalst	Okapi Forum	2,800
Oostende	Ostend	Coretec Dôme	5,000
Spirou	Charleroi	Spiroudome	6,200

== Regular season ==
=== Standings ===
Pos	Team	Pld	W	L	PF	PA	PD	PCT	Qualification or relegation
1	(Belgium) Windrose Giants Antwerp (C)	34	29	5	3286	2622	+664	.853	Advance to National Playoffs (BE)
2	(Belgium) Filou Oostende	34	25	9	3019	2698	+321	.735	Advance to National Playoffs (BE)
3	(Belgium) Okapi Aalst	34	25	9	3281	2984	+297	.735	Advance to National Playoffs (BE)
4	(Belgium) House of Talents Spurs Kortrijk	34	24	10	2988	2734	+254	.706	Advance to National Playoffs (BE)
5	(Belgium) Hubo Limburg United	34	23	11	3107	2737	+370	.676	Advance to National Playoffs (BE)
6	(Netherlands) Heroes Den Bosch	34	20	14	2898	2770	+128	.588	Advance to National Playoffs (NL)
7	(Netherlands) Donar Groningen	34	19	15	2814	2825	−11	.559	Advance to National Playoffs (NL)
8	(Belgium) Kangoeroes Basket Mechelen	34	19	15	2622	2682	−60	.559	Advance to National Playoffs (BE)
9	(Belgium) Brussels Basketball	34	18	16	2838	2717	+121	.529	Advance to National Playoffs (BE)
10	(Netherlands) ZZ Leiden	34	18	16	2890	2803	+87	.529	Advance to National Playoffs (NL)
11	(Belgium) Val-Dieu Spirou Basket	34	16	18	2801	2896	−95	.471	Advance to National Playoffs (BE)
12	(Belgium) Stella Artois Leuven Bears	34	15	19	2709	2724	−15	.441	
13	(Netherlands) Den Helder Suns	34	15	19	2823	2818	+5	.441	Advance to National Playoffs (NL)
14	(Netherlands) Landstede Hammers	34	14	20	2719	2802	−83	.412	Advance to National Playoffs (NL)
15	(Netherlands) LWD Basket	34	10	24	2856	3199	−343	.294	Advance to National Playoffs (NL)
16	(Belgium) Union Mons-Hainaut	34	9	25	2788	3170	−382	.265	
17	(Netherlands) Rotterdam City Basketball	34	4	30	2520	3096	−576	.118	
18	(Netherlands) PrismaWorx BAL	34	3	31	2345	3027	−682	.088	

Source: BNXT League
(C) Champions

=== Results ===
Home \ Away	(Belgium) BRU	(Netherlands) DHE	(Netherlands) DON	(Netherlands) HDB	(Belgium) OOS	(Belgium) SPU	(Belgium) LIM	(Belgium) MEC	(Netherlands) LAN	(Netherlands) ARI	(Belgium) OKA	(Netherlands) BAL	(Belgium) SPI	(Netherlands) ROT	(Belgium) LEU	(Belgium) MON	(Belgium) ANT	(Netherlands) ZZL
(Belgium) Brussels Basketball	—	77–90	91–76	76–84	81–96	63–68	62–87	56–57	97–75	93–76	85–89	103–51	88–69	85–68	82–70	96–76	78–79	97–80
(Netherlands) Den Helder Suns	80–83	—	86–88	109–64	74–100	73–84	91–83	68–76	73–70	89–83	83–85	101–70	103–94	99–65	71–66	84–90	76–103	68–84
(Netherlands) Donar Groningen	77–76	90–92	—	67–81	84–82	105–84	71–82	99–63	61–86	92–82	85–78	85–61	83–74	86–59	82–76	92–85	74–94	75–65
(Netherlands) Heroes Den Bosch	72–94	95–70	87–88	—	95–77	97–94	95–79	86–75	77–91	75–65	98–76	97–60	85–98	112–74	66–58	107–57	78–86	75–93
(Belgium) Filou Oostende	84–53	101–91	86–76	97–81	—	75–85	97–85	94–66	86–73	94–76	99–97	88–64	75–86	102–44	70–71	81–60	93–90	76–61
(Belgium) House of Talents Spurs Kortrijk	85–88	85–80	80–76	92–91	96–80	—	111–114	104–64	87–67	102–63	93–82	98–47	75–68	77–74	71–69	89–93	102–93	82–76
(Belgium) Hubo Limburg United	84–85	82–77	79–82	91–77	90–84	82–64	—	106–66	94–62	129–78	99–85	91–54	96–74	119–89	84–75	96–64	86–94	89–61
(Belgium) Kangoeroes Basket Mechelen	85–80	80–87	93–84	74–78	73–83	93–84	85–81	—	70–66	89–79	94–74	80–57	118–83	97–73	57–81	76–66	74–61	68–78
(Netherlands) Landstede Hammers	79–91	97–82	67–78	71–79	63–89	70–83	90–77	72–67	—	86–93	95–104	87–58	78–77	101–78	83–87	94–96	67–98	81–90
(Netherlands) LWD Basket	74–84	98–99	89–88	82–94	90–100	91–97	79–106	98–78	81–91	—	94–105	97–89	90–80	98–85	84–82	77–64	73–122	74–100
(Belgium) Okapi Aalst	87–84	105–85	111–82	107–103	90–109	93–74	107–98	93–76	81–95	118–90	—	108–73	108–89	102–92	95–76	98–78	103–89	108–83
(Netherlands) PrismaWorx BAL	89–82	73–83	73–86	61–77	92–96	66–82	62–92	71–77	78–86	72–86	82–103	—	55–86	85–75	65–77	86–64	78–110	64–83
(Belgium) Val-Dieu Spirou Basket	74–82	70–88	100–97	89–73	64–73	86–84	84–96	79–74	87–75	98–84	67–73	82–72	—	96–80	73–69	96–91	82–95	60–87
(Netherlands) Rotterdam City Basketball	66–83	0–40	79–101	71–74	82–84	80–110	81–101	74–92	68–88	85–75	76–106	72–68	93–94	—	85–75	103–102	78–91	73–75
(Belgium) Stella Artois Leuven Bears	83–88	84–71	86–78	88–85	76–80	86–97	90–89	71–77	69–61	100–96	90–106	91–64	91–95	93–64	—	91–88	52–104	90–73
(Belgium) Union Mons-Hainaut	104–97	93–88	87–93	88–93	95–115	76–96	105–81	76–93	80–89	101–107	77–104	103–78	79–101	82–78	63–93	—	76–116	77–72
(Belgium) Windrose Giants Antwerp	101–82	90–70	113–72	83–72	96–83	104–80	81–82	81–40	98–71	104–65	106–103	119–62	99–65	103–91	87–81	103–63	—	97–78
(Netherlands) ZZ Leiden	102–96	110–102	101–72	89–95	98–90	69–93	75–77	59–75	88–92	108–89	85–97	80–65	87–81	111–68	90–72	107–89	92–96	—

Source: BNXT League
Legend: Blue = home team win; Red = away team win.
Matches with lighter background shading were decided after overtime.

== National Playoffs ==
In the national playoffs, quarterfinals will be played best-of-three format (1–1–1), semifinals and finals will be played in a best-of-five format (1–1–1–1–1).

The best placed 8 Belgian teams will be qualified for the Belgian national play-offs, the best placed 6 Dutch teams will be qualified for the Dutch play-offs.

=== Belgium ===
==== Bracket ====
Quarterfinals
1	Windrose Giants Antwerp	2
8	Val-Dieu Spirou Basket	0
4	House of Talents Spurs Kortrijk	1
5	Hubo Limburg United	2
2	Filou Oostende	2
7	Brussels Basketball	0
3	Okapi Aalst	2
6	Kangoeroes Basket Mechelen	0

Semifinals
1	Windrose Giants Antwerp	3
5	Hubo Limburg United	1
2	Filou Oostende	3
3	Okapi Aalst	1

Finals
1	Windrose Giants Antwerp	3
2	Filou Oostende	2

==== Quarterfinals ====
Team 1	Series	Team 2	Game 1	Game 2	Game 3
Windrose Giants Antwerp (Belgium)	2−0	(Belgium) Val-Dieu Spirou Basket	109−92	93–77	—
Filou Oostende (Belgium)	2–0	(Belgium) Brussels Basketball	97–77	77–64	—
Okapi Aalst (Belgium)	2–0	(Belgium) Kangoeroes Basket Mechelen	93–84	90–85	—
House of Talents Spurs Kortrijk (Belgium)	1–2	(Belgium) Hubo Limburg United	63–90	96–86	79–90

==== Semifinals ====
Team 1	Series	Team 2	Game 1	Game 2	Game 3	Game 4	Game 5
Windrose Giants Antwerp (Belgium)	3−1	(Belgium) Hubo Limburg United	88–73	74–87	84–73	91–79	—
Filou Oostende (Belgium)	3–1	(Belgium) Okapi Aalst	89–80	97–101	78–60	83–77	—

==== Final ====
Team 1	Series	Team 2	Game 1	Game 2	Game 3	Game 4	Game 5
Windrose Giants Antwerp (Belgium)	3−2	(Belgium) Filou Oostende	100−83	69−79	76−81	70−69	89−84 (OT)

==== Final standings ====
Pos.	Team	Playoffs	Regular season
1	(Belgium) Windrose Giants Antwerp	Champion	1st
2	(Belgium) Filou Oostende	Runner-up	2nd
3	(Belgium) Okapi Aalst	Semifinals	3rd
4	(Belgium) Hubo Limburg United	Semifinals	5th
5	(Belgium) House of Talents Spurs Kortrijk	Quarterfinals	4th
6	(Belgium) Kangoeroes Basket Mechelen	Quarterfinals	6th
7	(Belgium) Brussels Basketball	Quarterfinals	7th
8	(Belgium) Val-Dieu Spirou Basket	Quarterfinals	8th

=== Dutch ===
==== Bracket ====
Quarterfinals
4	Den Helder Suns	0
5	Landstede Hammers	2
3	ZZ Leiden	2
6	LWD Basket	1

Semifinals
1	Heroes Den Bosch	1
5	Landstede Hammers	3
2	Donar Groningen	2
3	ZZ Leiden	3

Finals
3	ZZ Leiden	1
5	Landstede Hammers	3

==== Quarterfinals ====
Team 1	Series	Team 2	Game 1	Game 2	Game 3
ZZ Leiden (Netherlands)	2–1	(Netherlands) LWD Basket	111−72	85−94 (OT)	107−86
Den Helder Suns (Netherlands)	0–2	(Netherlands) Landstede Hammers	72−80	71−90	—

==== Semifinals ====
Team 1	Series	Team 2	Game 1	Game 2	Game 3	Game 4	Game 5
Heroes Den Bosch (Netherlands)	1–3	(Netherlands) Landstede Hammers	76–56	63–70	71–86	57–72	—
Donar Groningen (Netherlands)	2–3	(Netherlands) ZZ Leiden	91–68	78–90	97–89	71–91	77–79

==== Final ====
Team 1	Series	Team 2	Game 1	Game 2	Game 3	Game 4	Game 5
ZZ Leiden (Netherlands)	1−3	(Netherlands) Landstede Hammers	68–86	61–59	61–75	74–90	—

==== Final standings ====
Pos.	Team	Playoffs	Regular season
1	(Netherlands) Landstede Hammers	Champion	5th
2	(Netherlands) ZZ Leiden	Runner-up	3rd
3	(Netherlands) Heroes Den Bosch	Semifinals	1st
4	(Netherlands) Donar Groningen	Semifinals	2nd
5	(Netherlands) Den Helder Suns	Quarterfinals	4th
6	(Netherlands) LWD Basket	Quarterfinals	6th

== Individual awards ==
=== Monthly awards ===
Month	Player of the Month		Young player of the Month		Ref.
Month	Player	Club	Player	Club	Ref.
2025
September	(United States) Jalen Blackmon	(Belgium) Hugo Limburg United	(Belgium) Siebe Ledegen	(Belgium) Okapi Aalst	
October	(United States) Jalen Blackmon	(Belgium) Hugo Limburg United	(Belgium) Siebe Ledegen	(Belgium) Okapi Aalst	
November	(United States) Dante Maddox Jr.	(Belgium) Okapi Aalst	(Belgium) Onyeka Joe Agu	(Belgium) Brussels Basketball	
December	(Lithuania) Arūnas Mikalauskas	(Netherlands) Heroes Den Bosch	(Belgium) Siebe Ledegen (x2)	(Belgium) Okapi Aalst	
2026
January	(United States) Dante Maddox Jr. (x2)	(Belgium) Okapi Aalst	(Belgium) Roel Bucumi	(Belgium) Stella Artois Leuven Bears	
February	(United States) James Graham	(Netherlands) Rotterdam City Basketball	(Belgium) Roel Bucumi (x2)	(Belgium) Stella Artois Leuven Bears	
March	(Israel) (Denmark) Noam Yaacov	(Belgium) Filou Oostende	(Belgium) Siebe Ledegen (x3)	(Belgium) Okapi Aalst	

=== BNXT Awards ===
The winner of individual awards was announced on May 12, 2026.

Category	Player	Team	Nominees	Ref.
Most Valuable Player (MVP)	(United States) Dante Maddox Jr.	(Belgium) Okapi Aalst	(United States) Rasheed Bello (Antwerp Giants) (United States) Dante Maddox Jr. (Okapi Aalst) (Israel) Noam Yaacov (Filou Oostende)	
Belgian Playoff Finals MVP	(United States) Rasheed Bello	(Netherlands) Antwerp Giants	–	
Dutch Playoff Finals MVP	(United States) Jalen Thomas	(Netherlands) Landstede Hammers	–	
Dream Team	(United States) Dante Maddox Jr.	(Belgium) Okapi Aalst	–	
Dream Team	(United States) Rasheed Bello	(Belgium) Windrose Antwerp Giants	–	
Dream Team	(United States) Enoch Cheeks	(Belgium) Windrose Antwerp Giants	–	
Dream Team	(United States) Tytan Anderson	(Belgium) Filou Oostende	–	
Dream Team	(Sweden) Zaba Bangala	(Belgium) Kangoeroes Mechelen	–	
Dutch Player of the Year	(Netherlands) Marijn Ververs	(Belgium) HUBO Limburg United	(Netherlands) Lucas Kruithof (ZZ Leiden) (Netherlands) Coen Stolk (Landstede Hammers) (Netherlands) Marijn Ververs (Hubo Limburg United)	
Belgian Player of the Year	(Belgium) Niels Van Den Eynde	(Belgium) Okapi Aalst	(Belgium) Niels De Ridder (Antwerp Giants) (Belgium) Niels Van Den Eynde (Okapi Aalst) (Belgium) Bram Bogaerts (Kortrijk Spurs)	
Rising Star of the Year (Netherlands)	(Netherlands) Tjall de Vaal	(Netherlands) Rotterdam City Basketball	(Netherlands) Thijs Beens (Helder Suns) (Netherlands) Tjall de Vaal (Rotterdam) (Netherlands) Noah Slingerland (Rotterdam)	
Rising Star of the Year (Belgium)	(Belgium) Letto Van Drom	(Belgium) Windrose Antwerp Giants	(Belgium) Guillaume De Mol (Leuven Bears) (Belgium) Victor Vanderstraeten (Leuven Bears) (Belgium) Letto Van Drom (Antwerp Giants)	
Sixth Man of the Year	(United States) Dante Maddox Jr.	(Belgium) Okapi Aalst	(United States) Dante Maddox Jr. (Okapi Aalst) (Canada) Keevan Veinot (Heroes Den Bosch) (Belgium) Niels De Ridder (Antwerp Giants)	
Defensive Player of the Year	(United States) Enoch Cheeks	(Belgium) Windrose Antwerp Giants	(Netherlands) Lucas Kruithof (ZZ Leiden) (United States) Enoch Cheeks (Antwerp Giants) (Belgium) Kevin Tumba (Antwerp Giants)	
Coach of the Year	(Belgium) Olivier Foucart	(Belgium) Okapi Aalst	(Belgium) Paul Vervaeck (Den Helder Suns) (Belgium) Roel Moors (Antwerp Giants) (Belgium) Olivier Foucart (Okapi Aalst)	
Referee of the Year (Netherlands)	(Netherlands) Tijmen Last	–	(Netherlands) Bert Van Slooten (Netherlands) Stan Kestein (Netherlands) Tijmen Last	
Referee of the Year (Belgium)	(Belgium) Geert Jacobs	–	(Belgium) Geert Jacobs (Belgium) Nick Van den Broeck (Belgium) Pierre Gillis	

== BNXT clubs in European competitions ==
Team	Competition	Progress
(Basketball Belgium) Filou Oostende	Champions League	Regular Season
(Basketball Nederland) Heroes Den Bosch	Champions League	Qualifying round
(Basketball Belgium) Windrose Giants Antwerp	Champions League	Qualifying round
(Basketball Belgium) Windrose Giants Antwerp	FIBA Europe Cup	Regular Season
(Basketball Belgium) Kangoeroes Basket Mechelen	FIBA Europe Cup	Qualifying round

- Italics indicate ongoing progress

== BNXT clubs in Regional competitions ==
Team	Competition	Progress
(Basketball Nederland) Donar Groningen	European North Basketball League	Quarterfinals
(Basketball Belgium) Brussels Basketball	European North Basketball League	Regular season
