= 2026–27 BNXT League =

- League: BNXT League
- Sport: Basketball
- Duration: 3 October 2026–8 May 2027 (Regular Season)
- Teams: 16

Regular season

National playoffs

Finals

BNXT seasons
- ← 2025–26 2027–28 →

The 2026–27 BNXT League will be the sixth season of the BNXT League, the highest professional basketball league in Belgium and the Netherlands. The season will start on 3 October 2026 and will finish with the playoffs in 2027.

The format is kept the same as the 2025–26 season with a round-robin regular season, in which each team will play one home game and one away game against each other team. The winner of the regular season will be crowned BNXT Champion. In addition, the top teams of each country will qualify for the national play-offs. The national play-offs decide which teams become the national champions.

== Competition formula ==
Round	Teams entering in this round
Regular season (18 teams)	11 Belgian teams; 5 Dutch teams; All teams play each other home and away; Bottom team relegated; The team that finishes the Regular Season at the top of the standings is crowned as the BNXT League champion.
National play-offs	Best 8 Belgian teams; All Belgian teams play in quarterfinals; Best 4 Dutch teams; All Dutch teams play in semifinals

The 2026–27 season also introduces a new rule for home-grown players. The league allows clubs to recruit one home-grown player from the other country and count these towards their homegrown player requirement.

== Teams ==
The 2026-27 BNXT season will feature only 16 teams compared to the 18 teams of the previous year. This number is reduced due to a small exodus of Dutch teams, who stated they were unable to maintain the professional standard of the BNXT League and maintain a competitive team at the same time. LWD Basket, Den Helder Suns and BAL all stated they were unable to compete in the BNXT League and would rather opt for a newly to be organized Dutch second division with the working title "Men's Basketball League". These clubs leaving, meant the option for the champion of the Promotiedivisie to promote to the BNXT League. The champion, GET United, stated that, despite announcing a year earlier that it was their ambition to promote back into the BNXT League, they wouldn't apply for a license since they were too unsure about their competitiveness in the league.

On the other hand, in the Top Division Men One CB Liège a club had announced their ambition to promote in case they won the championship. The club succeeded in earning their promotion through winning the TDM1 championship and successfully applied for a license. The club was therefore granted a spot in the 2026-27 despite no Belgian team demoting.

Thus, eleven Belgian teams and five Dutch teams will participate in the 2026–27 season of the BNXT League.

=== Arenas and locations ===
Location of teams in the BNXT League

Note: Table lists in alphabetical order.

Club	Location	Venue	Capacity
Netherlands
Donar	Groningen	MartiniPlaza	4,350
Heroes Den Bosch	's-Hertogenbosch	Maaspoort	2,800
Landstede Hammers	Zwolle	Landstede Sportcentrum	1,200
Rotterdam City	Rotterdam	Topsportcentrum Rotterdam	2,500
ZZ Leiden	Leiden	Vijf Meihal	2,000
Belgium
Antwerp Giants	Antwerp	Lotto Arena	5,218
Brussels Basketball	Brussels	Sports Complex Neder-Over-Heembeek	1,200
CB Liège	Waremme	Province Ballons Arena	900
Kangoeroes Mechelen	Mechelen	Winketkaai	1,500
Kortrijk Spurs	Kortrijk	Sportcampus Lange Munte	2,400
Leuven Bears	Leuven	Sportoase	3,400
Limburg United	Hasselt	Alverberg Sporthal	1,730
Mons-Hainaut	Mons	Mons Arena	4,000
Okapi Aalst	Aalst	Okapi Forum	2,800
Oostende	Ostend	Coretec Dôme	5,000
Spirou	Charleroi	Spiroudome	6,200

== Regular season ==
=== Standings ===
Pos	Team	Pld	W	L	PF	PA	PD	PCT	Qualification or relegation
1	(Belgium) Windrose Giants Antwerp	8	8	0	789	618	+171	1.000	Advance to National Playoffs (BE)
2	(Belgium) Partena Professional Okapi Aalst	8	6	2	739	686	+53	.750	Advance to National Playoffs (BE)
3	(Belgium) Val-Dieu Spirou Basket	8	5	3	625	570	+55	.625	Advance to National Playoffs (BE)
4	(Netherlands) Heroes Den Bosch	8	5	3	663	657	+6	.625	Advance to National Playoffs (NL)
5	(Belgium) Brussels Basketball	8	5	3	635	574	+61	.625	Advance to National Playoffs (BE)
6	(Belgium) COREtec Oostende	8	5	3	630	560	+70	.625	Advance to National Playoffs (BE)
7	(Netherlands) Landstede Hammers	7	4	3	524	546	−22	.571	Advance to National Playoffs (NL)
8	(Netherlands) Donar Groningen	7	4	3	571	607	−36	.571	Advance to National Playoffs (NL)
9	(Belgium) Hubo Limburg United	8	4	4	714	691	+23	.500	Advance to National Playoffs (BE)
10	(Belgium) AB InBev Leuven Bears	8	4	4	571	595	−24	.500	Advance to National Playoffs (BE)
11	(Netherlands) ZZ Leiden	8	4	4	629	633	−4	.500	Advance to National Playoffs (NL)
12	(Belgium) Kangoeroes Basket Mechelen	8	3	5	703	726	−23	.375	Advance to National Playoffs (BE)
13	(Netherlands) Zeeuw & Zeeuw Rotterdam City	8	2	6	573	656	−83	.250	
14	(Belgium) CB Liège	8	2	6	633	716	−83	.250	
15	(Belgium) House of Talents Spurs Kortrijk	8	2	6	674	671	+3	.250	
16	(Belgium) Union Mons-Hainaut	8	0	8	541	708	−167	.000	Relegation

Updated to match(es) played on 21 November 2026. Source: BNXT League

=== Results ===
Home \ Away	(Belgium) BRU	(Belgium) CBL	(Netherlands) DON	(Netherlands) HDB	(Belgium) OOS	(Belgium) SPU	(Belgium) LIM	(Belgium) MEC	(Netherlands) LAN	(Belgium) OKA	(Belgium) SPI	(Netherlands) ROT	(Belgium) LEU	(Belgium) MON	(Belgium) ANT	(Netherlands) ZZL
(Belgium) Brussels Basketball	—	94–70			81–64					91–77	66–81					
(Belgium) CB Liège		—		71–80		94–93	73–101		88–84							
(Netherlands) Donar Groningen			—				73–96				63–90		81–78			
(Netherlands) Heroes Den Bosch	78–72			—				95–86				79–50	86–81		86–125	
(Belgium) COREtec Oostende					—				98–70			92–48	66–54		71–82	
(Belgium) House of Talents Spurs Kortrijk			76–85			—	83–88							83–63		
(Belgium) Hubo Limburg United							—	100–109		78–97		87–80				
(Belgium) Kangoeroes Basket Mechelen		96–78				83–93		—		79–94						84–89
(Netherlands) Landstede Hammers	65–89			70–59		73–71	88–84		—							
(Belgium) Partena Professional Okapi Aalst			114–90	102–100	95–87					—				83–69		
(Belgium) Val-Dieu Spirou Basket		77–74			65–70						—	77–74		98–60		
(Netherlands) Zeeuw & Zeeuw Rotterdam City		91–85	70–83									—		89–77		71–76
(Belgium) AB InBev Leuven Bears						72–69		68–91			69–65		—			67–64
(Belgium) Union Mons-Hainaut									57–74				73–82	—	63–100	79–99
(Belgium) Windrose Giants Antwerp	78–65					113–106	88–80	109–75			94–72				—	
(Netherlands) ZZ Leiden	61–77		83–96		65–82					92–77						—

Updated to match(es) played on 21 November 2026. Source: BNXT League
Legend: Blue = home team win; Red = away team win.
Matches with lighter background shading were decided after overtime.

== BNXT clubs in European competitions ==
By winning the 2025–26 Belgian championship, Antwerp Giants qualified directly for the regular season of the Champions League.

Landstede Hammers, the Dutch champion of the 2025–26 season, only earned a spot in the qualification round of the Champions League due to the weaker country coefficient.

Team	Competition	Progress
(Basketball Belgium) Antwerp Giants	Champions League	Regular Season
(Basketball Nederland) Landstede Hammers	Champions League	Qualifying rounds
(Basketball Belgium) COREtec Oostende	FIBA Europe Cup	Regular Season

- Italics indicate ongoing progress

== BNXT clubs in Regional competitions ==
Donar Groningen announced that they would take place in the regional European competition the ENBL for the third year in a row, despite qualifying for the FIBA Europe Cup due to their 2026 cup win.

Team	Competition	Progress
(Basketball Nederland) Donar Groningen	European North Basketball League	Regular season

- Italics indicate ongoing progress
