= Shane Hammink =

Dutch basketball player

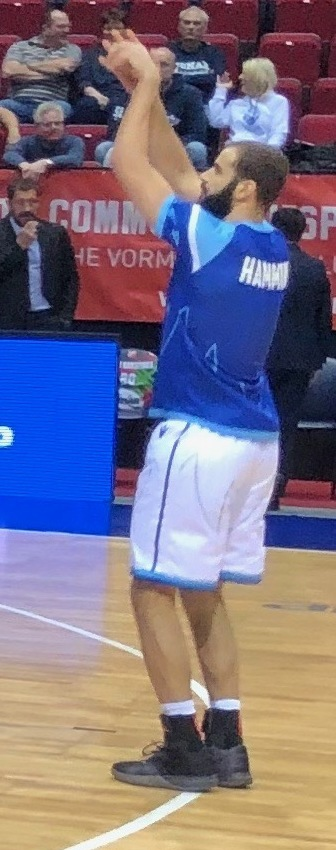
- Hammink with Donar in November 2019

Personal information
- Born: 22 July 1994 (age 32) Baton Rouge, Louisiana, U.S.
- Listed height: 6 ft 7 in (2.01 m)
- Listed weight: 210 lb (95 kg)

Career information
- College: LSU (2012–2014); Valparaiso (2015–2017)
- NBA draft: 2017: undrafted
- Playing career: 2017–2022
- Position: Shooting guard / small forward

Career history
- 2017–2018: Bilbao Basket
- 2018–2020: Donar
- 2020: Yoast United
- 2020–2021: Spirou
- 2021–2022: Heroes Den Bosch

Career highlights
- Dutch national champion (2022); Dutch Supercup champion (2018); DBL All-Rookie Team (2019); Second-team All-Horizon League (2017)

Shane Hammink (born 22 July 1994) is a Dutch former professional basketball player. He played college basketball in the United States for Louisiana State University (LSU) and Valparaiso University. Hammink went on to play in Spain, Belgium and the Netherlands. He won the Dutch national championship in 2022.

Hammink also represented the Netherlands national team and played with his country at EuroBasket 2022. Shane is the son of former National Basketball Association (NBA) player Geert Hammink.

== Early life ==
Hammink was born in Baton Rouge, Louisiana to Geert and Rhonda Hammink. From age eight, he lived in the Netherlands and moved as his father embarked upon his eleven-year career in various countries, including parts of three seasons in the NBA. Prior to college, Hammink spent a year at the Canarias Basketball Academy, where he honed his basketball skills.

== College career ==
Hammink originally committed to LSU, where his father had played center from 1989 to 1993. He played sporadically off the bench for the Tigers, scoring 74 points and recording 64 rebounds in 47 games over two seasons. Following the 2013–14 season, Hammink decided to transfer along with two other Tigers (Anthony Hickey and Malik Morgan). Hammink ultimately chose to play for coach Bryce Drew at Valparaiso.

Hammink sat out the 2014–15 season due to National Collegiate Athletic Association (NCAA) transfer eligibility rules, then joined the Crusaders for the 2015–16 campaign. In his first season, Hammink teamed with Alec Peters and Vashil Fernandez to lead the team to the finals of the 2016 National Invitation Tournament. He averaged 8.9 points and 3.1 rebounds per game in the season. In his senior season, Hammink and Peters led Valparaiso to a share of the Horizon League regular-season championship. Hammink averaged 15.1 points per game and was named second-team All-Horizon League.

== Professional career ==
=== Bilbao Basket (2017–2018) ===
Following the close of his college career, Hammink was not selected in the 2017 NBA draft. He ultimately signed with Bilbao Basket of the Spanish Liga ACB and EuroCup. Hammink averaged 3.9 points, 1.8 rebounds and 0.7 assists for Bilbao in the ACB.

=== Donar (2018–2020) ===
On 13 July 2018, Donar announced Hammink signed a three-year contract with the Dutch club playing in the Dutch Basketball League (DBL). In the 2018–19 season, Hammink reached the DBL Finals with Donar where the team lost to Landstede Hammers. In his rookie season in the DBL, he averaged 8.2 points, 2.4 rebounds and 1.2 assists.

His second season with Donar, the 2019–20 season, was ended prematurely because of the COVID-19 pandemic. He averaged 11.0 points, 4.5 rebounds and 2.7 assists in 19 DBL games. On 4 July 2020, Hammink and Donar parted ways.

=== Yoast United (2020) ===
On 1 October 2020, Hammink signed with Yoast United, newcomer in the Dutch Basketball League (DBL). His contract included an opt-out in case he could sign with a foreign club. The season was suspended after two games due to the COVID-19 pandemic.

=== Spirou (2020–2021) ===
On November 31, 2020, Hammink signed in Belgium with Spirou Basket.

=== Heroes Den Bosch (2021–2022) ===
On June 21, 2021, Hammink signed a 2-year deal with Heroes Den Bosch. In his first season with Heroes, he won the Dutch national championship. On August 30, 2022, Hammink and Heroes agreed to terminate his contract as he went into retirement at age 28.

== National team career ==
Hammink played for the Netherlands in FIBA at the U16, U17 and U20 levels before joining the senior national team in 2014. He played at EuroBasket 2022 where he contributed 3.3 points per game off the bench.

He played a total of 34 games for the Netherlands, scoring 190 points in total (5.6 per game).
