= Basketball Days =

- Sport: Basketball
- Founded: 2011
- Folded: 2013
- No. of teams: 8
- Most titles: (Netherlands) Landstede Basketbal (2 titles)
- Website: basketballdays.nl

Basketball Days is a yearly friendly international basketball tournament that is held in Zwolle, Netherlands since 2011. The tournament is played by 8 teams from around the world in the Landstede Topsportcentrum, home of Landstede Basketbal. It is held from December 26 till December 30.

The first two editions were won by the host team, Landstede Basketbal. The tournament won't be held since 2013.

== Tournaments ==
Edition	Year	Winner	Runner-up	Third	Fourth
1	2011	(Netherlands) Landstede Basketbal	(Brazil) Grêmio Mogiano	Nigeria	(England) Newcastle Eagles
2	2012	(Netherlands) Landstede Basketbal	(Estonia) Tartu Rock	(United States) NYC Warriors	United Arab Emirates

== Teams ==
A list of all teams that have participated at a Basketball Days-tournament.

Club teams

- (Netherlands) Landstede Basketbal
- (Brazil) Grêmio Mogiano
- (Kazakhstan) Barsy Atyrau
- (England) Newcastle Eagles
- (China) Jiangsu Lions

National teams

- Netherlands
- Nigeria
- United Arab Emirates

Unofficial teams

- (United States) New York City Warriors
- (United States) WNTA Falcons
- (United States) 94 Fifty All Stars

== Awards ==
Most Valuable Player
2011	(United States) Damon Huffman	Landstede Basketbal
2012	(United States) Josh Magette	Landstede Basketbal
