= Robby Bostain =

American-Israeli basketball player

Robby Bostain רובי בוסטיין
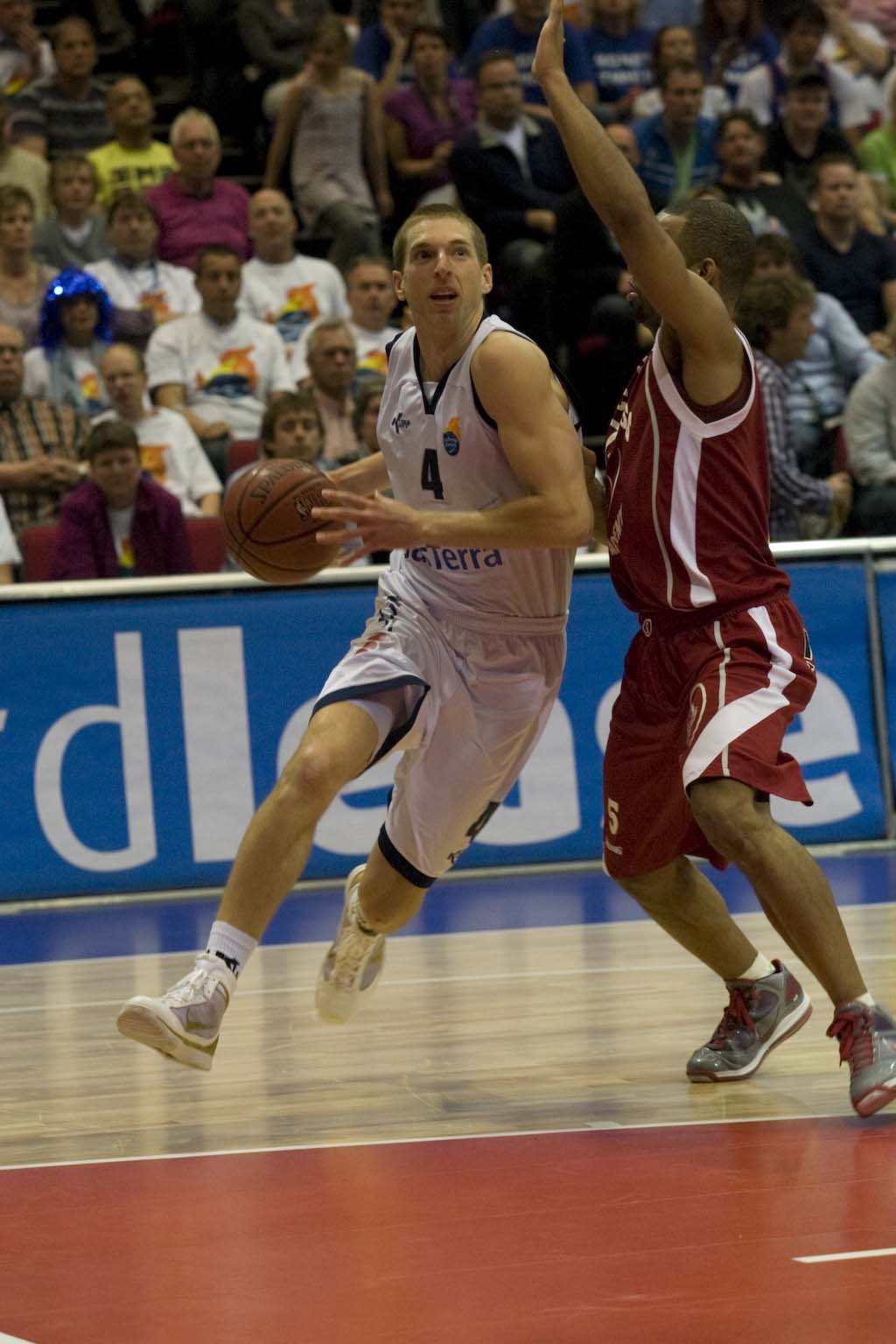
- Bostain playing for GasTerra Flames in 2010

Personal information
- Born: March 16, 1984 (age 42) Duluth, Georgia
- Listed height: 6 ft 4 in (1.93 m)
- Listed weight: 200 lb (91 kg)

Career information
- High school: Brookwood (Snellville, Georgia)
- College: Furman (2003–2007)
- NBA draft: 2007: undrafted
- Playing career: 2007–2015
- Position: Point guard
- Number: 4

Career history
- 2007–2009: Landstede Zwolle
- 2009–2011: GasTerra Flames
- 2012: Maccabi Ashdod
- 2013–2015: Ironi Nes Ziona

Career highlights
- Dutch League champion (2010); Dutch Cup winner (2011); 3× DBL All-Star (2009, 2010, 2011)

Robby Bostain (Hebrew: רובי בוסטיין; born March 16, 1984) is an American-Israeli former professional basketball player.

== Career ==
Bostain started his professional career with Landstede Basketbal, a team in the Netherlands that plays in the Dutch Basketball League (DBL). On February 21, 2009, he scored a career-high 49 points in a 105–101 overtime win over Aris Leeuwarden.

After two seasons with the team, he went to Groningen to play for the GasTerra Flames. In his first year with the club, he won the Dutch championship. In his second year, he played in the Euroleague qualification and won the Dutch NBB Cup with the Flames.

In 2012, Bostain signed with Maccabi Ashdod, where he played 11 games. After the season it was announced that Bostain wouldn't return to Israel. On November 12, 2013 Bostain signed with Ironi Nes Ziona. He extended his contract with one year in May 2014.

== Honours ==
Club

- Dutch Champion (2010)
- Dutch Cup (2011)

Individual

- DBL All-Star (3): (2009, 2010, 2011)
