= Terrence Bieshaar =

Dutch professional basketball player

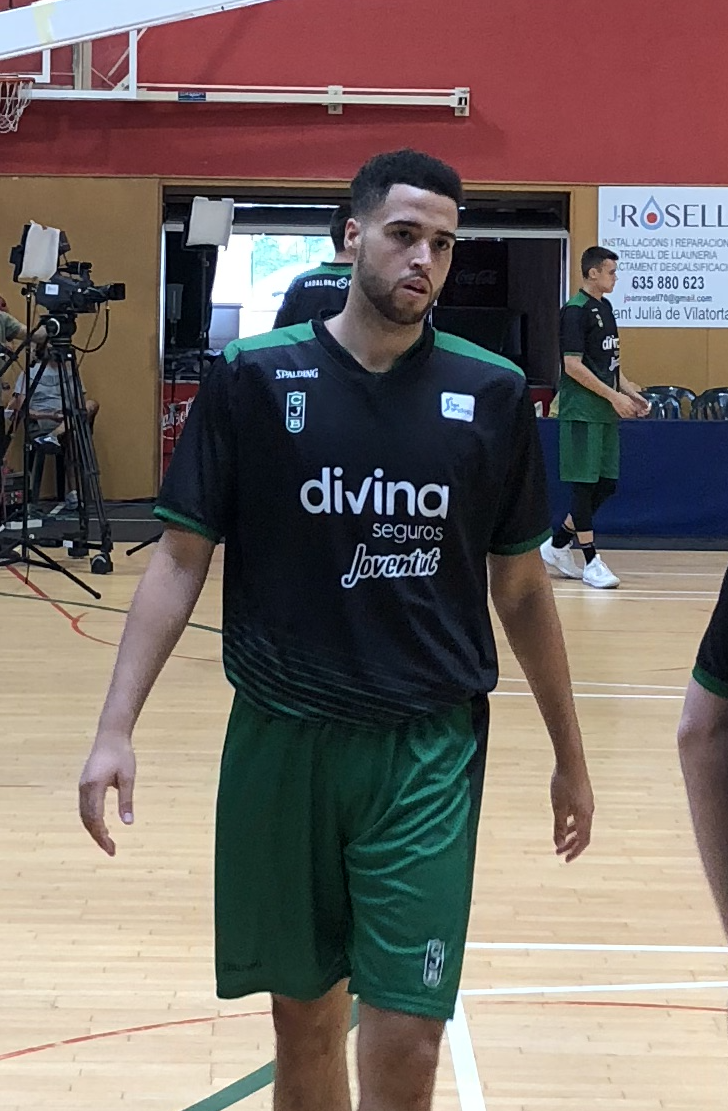
- Bieshaar with Joventut in 2018

No. 14 – Rayos de Hermosillo
- Position: Center
- League: CIBACOPA

Personal information
- Born: July 28, 1997 (age 29) Haarlem, Netherlands
- Listed height: 6 ft 10 in (2.08 m)

Career information
- Playing career: 2015–present

Career history
- 2015–2020: Joventut Badalona
- 2015–2017: →Prat
- 2015–2016: →Queso Milner-Arenys Barcelona
- 2017–2018: →Clavijo
- 2018: →Prat
- 2019–2020: →Clavijo
- 2020–2021: Oberwart Gunners
- 2022–2023: Feyenoord
- 2023–2024: Landstede Hammers
- 2024: Kaohsiung Aquas
- 2025: Colegio Los Leones
- 2026–present: Rayos de Hermosillo

Terrence Christoffel Bieshaar (born 28 July 1997) is a Dutch professional basketball player.

== Early career ==
Bieshaar and his family moved to Sant Pere de Ribes, Spain, when he was nine years old. In 2009, he joined the youth ranks of Spanish powerhouse FC Barcelona, before transferring to Joventut Badalona two years later.

== Professional career ==
In the 2015–16 season, Bieshaar made his debut in senior basketball, when spending time on loan with Spanish LEB Oro side C.B. Prat Joventut and EBA club Queso Milner-Arenys Basquet Barcelona.

In the course of the 2016-17 campaign, he debuted for Joventut Badalona in Spain's elite league Liga ACB, while seeing considerable minutes for C.B. Prat Joventut in LEB Oro play. In August 2017, he signed with LEB Oro side CB Clavijo. After another stint at prat, Bieshaar joined Austrian first league side Oberwart Gunners in July 2020.

On February 14, 2022, he has signed with Feyenoord of the BNXT League.

Terrence Bieshaar played for Landstede Zwolle in the BNXT League during the 2023–24 season.

On August 2, 2024, Bieshaar signed with the Kaohsiung Aquas of the Taiwan Professional Basketball League (TPBL). On December 31, Kaohsiung Aquas terminated the contract relationship with Bieshaar.

In January 2025, Terrence signed with Den Bosch Heroes. With Den Bosch Heroes he directly won the Dutch Cup. In the BNXT competition, Terrence and his team, were ranked as the first Dutch team. Currently, Terrence and his team of Den Bosch Heroes are in the finals for the Dutch championship.

== International career ==
Bieshaar represented the Netherlands at the 2013 under-16 European Championships (Division B) as well as at the 2015 under-18 (Division B) and 2016 under-20 (Division B) European Championships.

On 7 November 2017, Bieshaar was selected by coach Toon van Helfteren for the senior Netherlands national basketball team for the first time. On 23 February 2018, he made his national team debut against Italy.
