= Deshawn Freeman =

American basketball player

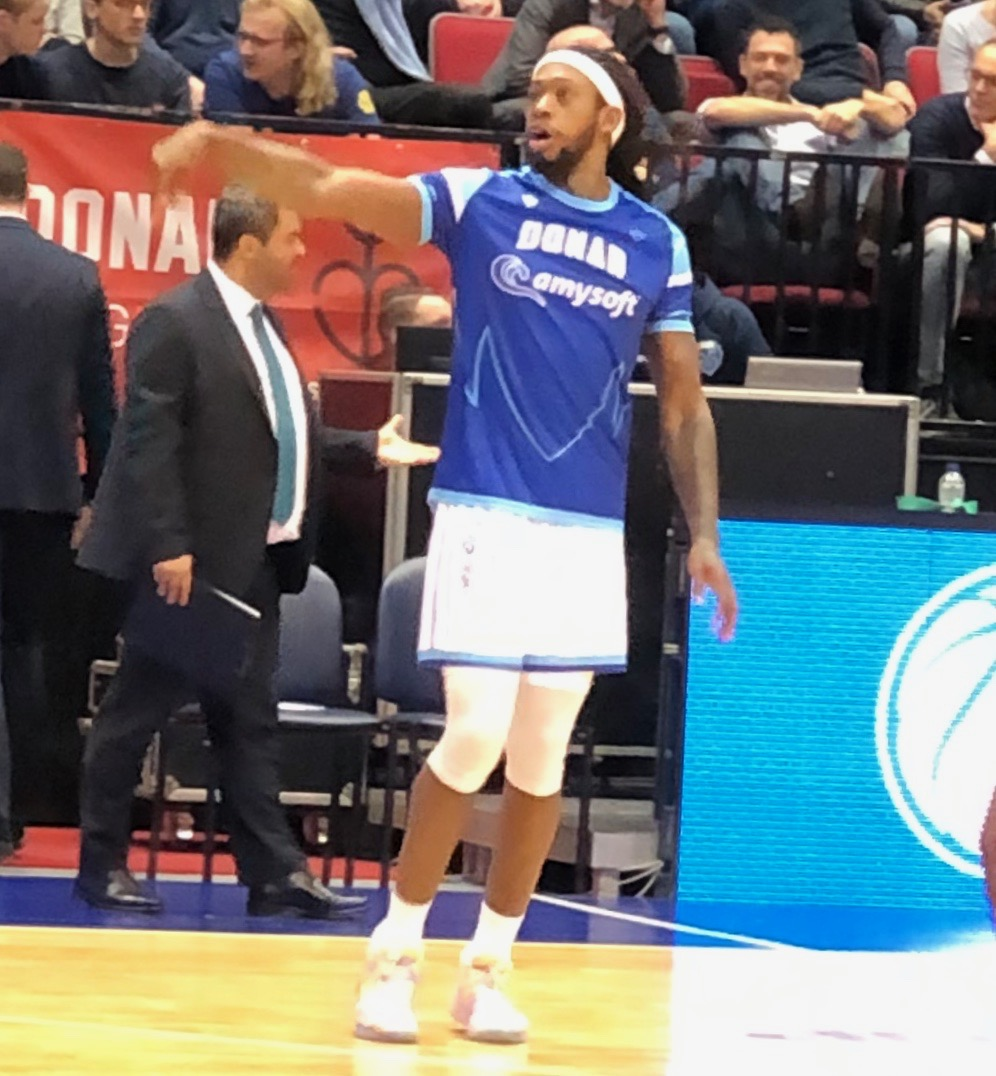
- Freeman with Donar in November 2019

No. 33 – Fortitudo Bologna
- Position: Forward
- League: Serie A2

Personal information
- Born: March 15, 1994 (age 31) Rocky Mount, North Carolina, U.S.
- Listed height: 6 ft 7 in (2.01 m)
- Listed weight: 225 lb (102 kg)

Career information
- High school: Rocky Mount Prep (Rocky Mount, North Carolina)
- College: Rutgers (2015–2018)
- NBA draft: 2018: undrafted
- Playing career: 2018–present

Career history
- 2018–2019: Worcester Wolves
- 2019: Donar
- 2019–2020: Södertälje Kings
- 2021–2022: BK Patrioti Levice
- 2023: Nevėžis Kėdainiai
- 2023–present: Fortitudo Bologna

Career highlights
- Alpe Adria Cup winner (2022); Slovak League champion (2022)

Deshawn Freeman (born March 15, 1994) is an American professional basketball player for Fortitudo Bologna of the Italian Serie A2. He played three seasons of college basketball for Rutgers seasons before turning professionally in 2018.

== Career ==
After three seasons with Rutgers, Freeman signed with the Worcester Wolves on October 11, 2018. He was the leading scorer for the Wolves in the British Basketball League (BBL), averaging 17.9 points per game along with 9.7 rebounds in 19 games.

On August 7, 2019, Freeman signed a one-year contract with Donar of the Dutch Basketball League (DBL). He left the team in November 2019 after averaging 5.3 points over 9 games.

He continued his season with Södertälje Kings in Sweden, where he averaged 11.6 points per game in 9 games. The season was ended early due to the COVID-19 pandemic.

On August 14, 2021, Freeman signed with BK Patrioti Levice of the Slovak Basketball League.

On January 4, 2023, Freeman signed with Nevėžis Kėdainiai of the Lithuanian Basketball League (LKL). Freeman made the news for missing all 13 free throws in the season finale against Žalgiris Kaunas on May 15, 2023. He finished the season averaging 16.8 points, 6.4 rebounds, 1.9 assists and 1.3 steals in 21 Lithuanian League games played.
