= Matt McCarthy (basketball) =

Australian basketball player

No. 33 – Atletico Platense
- Position: Center
- League: Liga A

Personal information
- Born: 30 July 1996 (age 30) Melbourne, Australia
- Listed height: 6 ft 9 in (2.06 m)
- Listed weight: 232 lb (105 kg)

Career information
- College: San Francisco (2015–2019)
- NBA draft: 2019: undrafted
- Playing career: 2019–present

Career history
- 2019–2020: Donar
- 2020–2021: CSO Voluntari
- 2021–2022: Vitória
- 2022-2023: BC Pärnu Sadam
- 2023-2024: Atletico Platense

Career highlights
- Romanian Cup champion (2021)

Matthew McCarthy (born 30 July 1996) is an Australian basketball player for Atletico Platense in the Argentinean Liga A He played four seasons collegiately in the United States for the San Francisco Dons, before turning professional. Standing at 2.06 m (6 ft 9 in), McCarthy primarily plays center.

== College career ==
After graduating from Xavier College in Kew, Victoria, McCarthy committed to play for the San Francisco Dons. In his senior season, he averaged 8.7 points and 6.3 rebounds per game for San Francisco. McCarthy was also a valued member of the San Francisco track and field program.

== Professional career ==
On 2 August 2019, McCarthy signed his first professional contract with Donar of the Dutch Basketball League (DBL). The 2019–20 season was cancelled prematurely in March because of the COVID-19 pandemic. He averaged 7.7 points and 5.3 rebounds per game. On 17 August 2020, McCarthy signed with CSO Voluntari of the Romanian Liga Națională. He scored a career-high 22 points in a home game against Targu Jiu on January 15, 2021

For the 2021–22 season, McCarthy signed with Vitória of the Liga Portuguesa de Basquetebol (LPB).

For the 2022-23 season, McCarthy signed with BC Pärnu Sadam of the Latvian-Estonian Basketball League. For the 2023-24 season, McCarthy signed a deal with Atletico Platense of the Argentinean Liga A.
