= Juan Davis =

American basketball player (born 1996)

Personal information
- Born: August 15, 1996 (age 30) West Point, Mississippi, U.S.
- Listed height: 6 ft 8 in (2.03 m)
- Listed weight: 204 lb (93 kg)

Career information
- College: East Mississippi (2014–2016); Troy (2016–2018)
- Playing career: 2018–present
- Position: Forward

Career history
- 2018–2019: Nokia
- 2019: Raholan Tampere
- 2019–2020: Kauhajoki Karhu Basket
- 2020–2021: Feyenoord
- 2021–2022: MZT Skopje
- 2022–2024: Zadar
- 2025–2026: MZT Skopje

Career highlights
- North Macedonia League champion (2022); 2 x Croatian League champion (2023, 2024)

Juan Palaunde Davis Jr. (born August 15, 1996) is an American professional basketball player who last played for MZT Skopje of the Macedonian League. He played college basketball at East Mississippi from 2014 to 2016 and Troy from 2016 to 2018.

== College career ==
As a senior at Troy in 2016-17, Davis averaged 7.1 points and 3.9 rebounds in 20 minutes in 37 appearances.

== Professional career ==
On August 3, 2018, he signed with BC Nokia from Finland. On October 12, 2021, he debuted for MZT Skopje against Mladost Zemun, scoring 8 points and seven rebounds. On September 22, 2022, Juan Davis signed with the Croatian basketball team Zadar. On his debut for Zadar on September 30, 2022, he scored 9 points in the home game against SC Derby.
