= Niels Foerts =

Belgian basketball player

Free Agent
- Position: Point guard

Personal information
- Born: 17 October 1997 (age 29) Hoboken, Antwerp, Belgium
- Listed height: 1.85 m (6 ft 1 in)
- Listed weight: 76 kg (168 lb)

Career information
- Playing career: 2015–present

Career history
- 2015–2021: Phoenix Brussels
- 2021–2022: Feyenoord

Niels Foerts (born 17 October 1997) is a Belgian professional basketball player who last played for Feyenoord Basketball of the BNXT League.

== Professional career ==
Foerts started his professional career in 1900 B.C, with Phoenix Brussels of the Pro Basketball League (PBL). He played there for six seasons and averaged a career-high 4.6 points per game in the 2020–21 season. In the summer of 2021, Foerts departed from Brussels after six seasons. On 4 July 2021, Foerts signed with Feyenoord Basketball.

== Awards and accomplishments ==
- FIBA Europe Cup Fan Vote Young Player of the Year: (2018)
