= Dalven Brushier =

Dutch basketball player

Free agent
- Position: Shooting guard

Personal information
- Born: April 23, 1998 (age 28) Colorado Springs, Colorado
- Listed height: 6 ft 3 in (1.91 m)
- Listed weight: 185 lb (84 kg)

Career information
- High school: Doherty (Colorado Springs, Colorado)
- College: Salt Lake CC (2016–2018); Western Oregon (2018–2020)
- NBA draft: 2020: undrafted
- Playing career: 2020–present

Career history
- 2020–2021: Feyenoord

Career highlights
- First-team All-GNAC (2020)

Dalven Brushier (born April 23, 1998) is an American professional basketball player who last played for Feyenoord Basketball of the Dutch Basketball League.

== Early life and high school career ==
Brushier attended Doherty High School. As a senior, he averaged 18.3 points, 6.0 rebounds and 3.4 assists per game. Brushier led the Spartans to the Class 5A quarterfinals. He was named the Colorado Springs Metro League player of the year.

== College career ==
Brushier began his college career at Salt Lake Community College. He averaged 9.2 points per game as a sophomore and was an All-Region 18 Honorable Mention selection. Brushier transferred to Western Oregon and averaged 10.3 points per game as a junior, shooting 41.7 percent from the field. He scored a career-high 37 points against Saint Martin's. As a senior, Brushier averaged 18.1 points and 4.3 rebounds per game. He was named to the First Team All-Great Northwest Athletic Conference as well as Second Team D2CCA West Region.

== Professional career ==
On August 16, 2020, Brushier signed his first professional contract with Feyenoord Basketball of the Dutch Basketball League (DBL). He parted ways with the team in January 2021.
