= Matt Williams (basketball) =

American basketball player (born 1993)

Personal information
- Born: October 14, 1993 (age 33) Orlando, Florida, U.S.
- Listed height: 6 ft 5 in (1.96 m)
- Listed weight: 210 lb (95 kg)

Career information
- High school: Jones (Orlando, Florida)
- College: UCF (2012–2017)
- NBA draft: 2017: undrafted
- Playing career: 2017–2022
- Position: Shooting guard
- Number: 12

Career history
- 2017: Miami Heat
- 2017: →Sioux Falls Skyforce
- 2018: Sioux Falls Skyforce
- 2018–2019: KTP
- 2019: Kymis
- 2019–2020: Donar
- 2020–2021: Cimarrones Caribbean Storm
- 2021: GTK Gliwice
- 2021–2022: Lavrio
- 2022: Supersónicos de Miranda
- Stats at NBA.com
- Stats at Basketball Reference

Matthew Williams Jr. (born October 14, 1993) is an American former professional basketball player. Born and raised in Orlando, Florida, Williams played college basketball for the UCF Knights.

== College career ==
Williams came to the University of Central Florida from Jones High School in Orlando. He suffered several medical setbacks as he suffered a burst appendix as a freshman, then played through knee pain as a sophomore. Early in his junior season, Williams had tests and learned that his knee pain was due to inferior bipartite patella, a rare congenital condition requiring surgery. Williams had the surgery, missing the majority of that season.

Following his redshirt junior season, Williams graduated from UCF and entertained transferring for his remaining year of collegiate eligibility. He originally chose to transfer to Wake Forest, but ultimately changed his mind and returned to UCF for his final year to play for new Knights coach Johnny Dawkins. In his fifth year, Williams upped his scoring average from 8.1 to 15.1 points per game, helping lead the Knights to the semifinals of the 2017 National Invitation Tournament. Williams finished his UCF career as the school's leader in three-pointers for a career (274), season (126) and game (11). The season and game marks were also American Athletic Conference records.

== Professional career ==
=== Miami Heat/Sioux Falls Skyforce (2017–2018) ===
Following the close of his college career, Williams played for the Miami Heat in the 2017 NBA Summer League. At the end of the league, he signed with the Heat for the 2017–18 season. On October 15, his contract was converted to a two-way deal, meaning he'd be able to split playing time between the Heat and their NBA G League affiliate, the Sioux Falls Skyforce. He spent the first week of the season with the Heat before an assignment in the G-League. He was then recalled on December 20 as the Heat endured several simultaneous injuries. Williams played 3 minutes, posting a rebound and 4 assists against the New Orleans Pelicans on December 23. He appeared in a total of 3 games, tallying 5 points and a rebound in 11 minutes of action before he was waived on New Year's Eve in order for the team to sign Derrick Jones Jr. Williams was later reacquired by the Sioux Falls Skyforce.

=== KTP and Kymi (2018–2019) ===
On September 12, 2018, Williams joined KTP Basket of the Finnish Korisliiga. In January 2019, Williams signed with Kymi of the Greek Basket League. In 12 GBL games, Williams averaged 8.8 points and 2.7 rebounds in 26 minutes per game.

=== Donar (2019–2020) ===
On July 16, 2019, Williams signed with Donar of the Dutch Basketball League. The 2019–20 season was cancelled prematurely in March because of the COVID-19 pandemic, and Williams returned to the United States. He averaged 14.6 points, 3.2 rebounds and 1.7 assists in 21 DBL games.

=== Cimarrones Caribbean Storm (2020–2021) ===
Williams spent the 2020–21 season in Colombia with the Cimarrones Caribbean Storm, averaging 7.0 points and 2.0 rebounds per game.

=== GTK Gliwice (2021) ===
On August 11, 2021, Williams signed with GTK Gliwice of the Polish Basketball League. In 13 games, he averaged 9.5 points, 4.0 rebounds, and 1.4 assists per game.

=== Lavrio (2021–2022) ===
On December 11, 2021, Williams officially returned to Greece, signing with BCL club Lavrio. In 14 games, he averaged only 4.6 points, 1 rebound and 0.5 assists, playing around 18 minutes per game.

=== Supersónicos de Miranda (2022) ===
In July 2022, Williams signed with the Supersónicos de Miranda of the Venezuelan SuperLiga.

== Career statistics ==
Legend
GP	Games played	GS	Games started	MPG	Minutes per game
FG%	Field goal percentage	3P%	3-point field goal percentage	FT%	Free throw percentage
RPG	Rebounds per game	APG	Assists per game	SPG	Steals per game
BPG	Blocks per game	PPG	Points per game	**Bold**	Career high

=== NBA ===
Year	Team	GP	GS	MPG	FG%	3P%	FT%	RPG	APG	SPG	BPG	PPG
2017–18	Miami	3	0	3.7	.333	.200	—	.3	.0	.0	.0	1.7
Career		3	0	3.7	.333	.200	—	.3	.0	.0	.0	1.7
