= Andrej Jordanovski =

Macedonian basketball player

Free agent
- Position: Point guard

Personal information
- Born: 4 January 2000 (age 26)
- Listed height: 183 cm (6 ft 0 in)

Career information
- Playing career: 2016–present

Career history
- 2016–2017: Vardar
- 2017–2019: Rabotnički
- 2019–2020: Feyenoord

Andrej Jordanovski (born 4 January 2000) is a Macedonian basketball player who last played for Feyenoord Basketball. Standing at 183 cm (6 ft 0 in), he plays as point guard. He started his career in 2016 with KK Rabotnički of the Macedonian First League. In his rookie 2016–17 season, he played five games for Vardar's first team and plenty with Rabotnički's first team.

In the 2019–20 season, he played for Feyenoord Basketball of the Dutch Basketball League (DBL).

== National team career ==
Jordanovski played twice for the North Macedonia U16 team and twice for the U18 team.
