= Mack Bruining =

Dutch basketball player (born 1997)

Free Agent
- Position: Point guard

Personal information
- Born: 4 July 1997 (age 29) Rotterdam, Netherlands
- Listed height: 189 cm (6 ft 2 in)

Career information
- Playing career: 2015–present

Career history
- 2015–2019: Apollo Amsterdam
- 2019–2022: Feyenoord
- 2022–2024: Yoast United

Mack Bruining (born 4 July 1997) is a Dutch basketball player who last played for Yoast United of the BNXT League. Standing at 189 cm (6 ft 2 1/2 in), he plays as point guard.

In his junior years, Bruining played for Crvena zvezda in Serbia and Lokomotief in the Dutch Talent League. He started his professional career in 2015 with Apollo Amsterdam of the Dutch Basketball League (DBL). After four seasons, he signed with Feyenoord.

On 16 June 2022, Bruining signed with Yoast United.

== Personal ==
Mack is the son of Bareld Bruining, former player of RZ.
