= Raidell de Pree =

Dutch basketball player (born 1997)

Free agent
- Position: Point guard / shooting guard

Personal information
- Born: 17 November 1997 (age 28) Rotterdam, Netherlands
- Listed height: 1.96 m (6 ft 5 in)
- Listed weight: 97 kg (214 lb)

Career information
- High school: St. Mary's Ryken High School (Leonardtown, Maryland)
- College: Kankakee Community College (Kankakee, Illinois)
- Playing career: 2018–present

Career history
- 2018–2019: Mataró Parc Boet
- 2019–2021: Feyenoord

Raidell de Pree (born 17 November 1997) is a Dutch professional basketball player. He played two seasons for Feyenoord Basketball of the Dutch Basketball League (DBL) from 2019 to 2021.

== Early life ==
De Pree started playing at age 11 for the junior teams of CBV Binnenland. In 2015, he moved to the United States to attend St. Mary's Ryken High School in Leonardtown, Maryland.

== Career ==
De Pree played for Kankakee Community College in Kankakee, Illinois, where he graduated in 2018.

In the summer of 2019, De Pree joined Feyenoord after playing his rookie season in Spain with Mataró Parc Boet of the Liga EBA. On 25 August 2020 he extended his contract with one season.

De Pree played for the Netherlands U18 and U20 national teams.
