= Michael Kok =

Dutch basketball player

Feyenoord
- Title: Assistant coach
- League: BNXT League

Personal information
- Born: 19 September 1991 (age 35) Rotterdam, Netherlands
- Listed height: 1.92 m (6 ft 4 in)

Career information
- Playing career: 2012–2020
- Position: Shooting guard
- Number: 10
- Coaching career: 2022–present

Career history

Playing
- 2012–2020: Rotterdam / Feyenoord

Coaching
- 2022–present: Feyenoord (assistant)

Michael Jacob Kok (born 19 September 1991) is a Dutch retired basketball player. He formerly played for Rotterdam Basketbal 2 before joining the first team of the club in 2012. In 2015, Kok was selected for the U24 DBL All-Star Game. He retired in April 2020 after the 2019–20 season was ended early due to the COVID-19 pandemic.

Since 2022, Kok is an assistant coach with Feyenoord.
