= Keyshawn Woods =

American basketball player (born 1996)

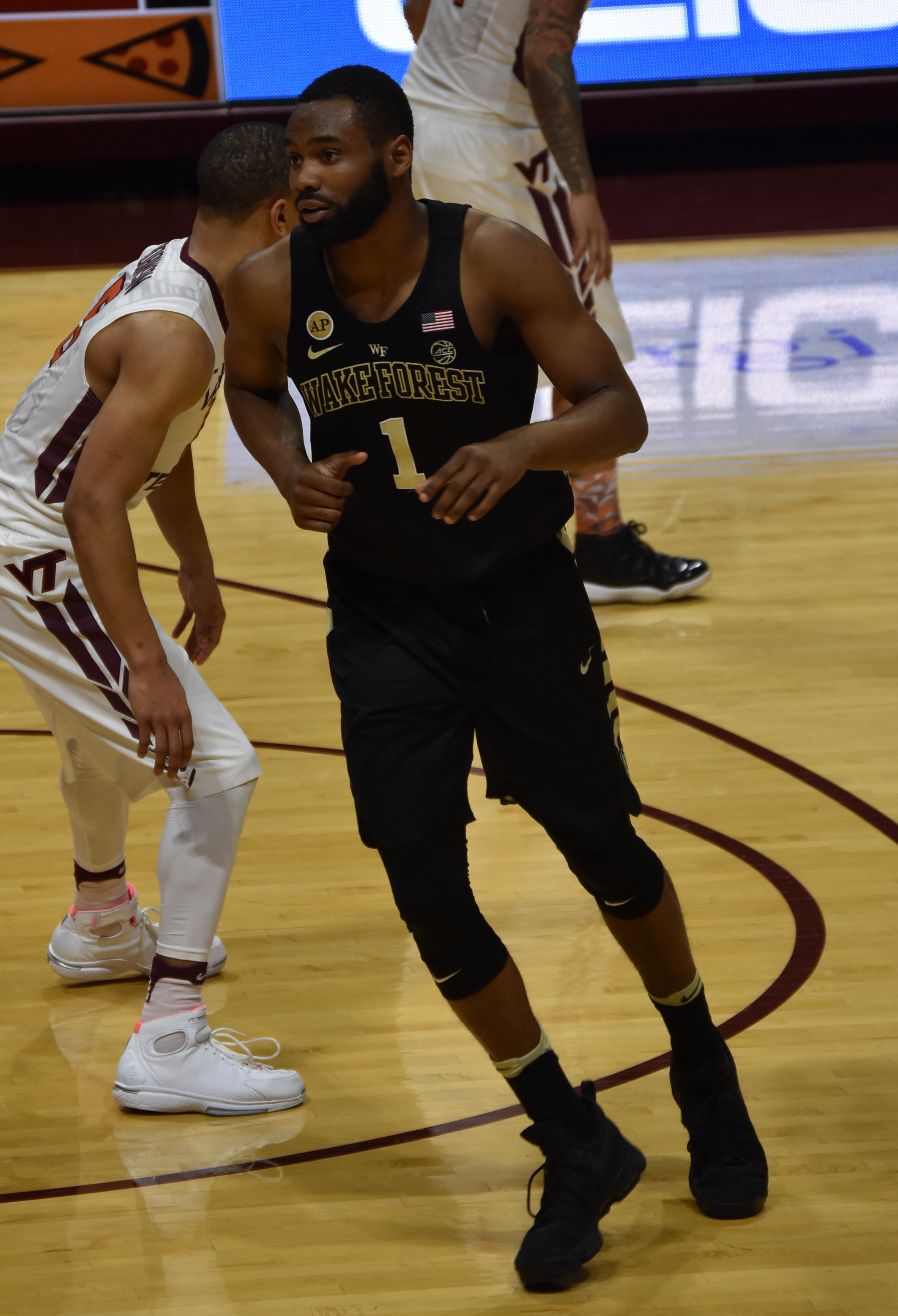
- Woods playing for Wake Forest in 2017

Personal information
- Born: January 28, 1996 (age 30) Gastonia, North Carolina, U.S.
- Listed height: 1.91 m (6 ft 3 in)
- Listed weight: 93 kg (205 lb)

Career information
- High school: Northside Christian Academy (Charlotte, North Carolina)
- College: Charlotte (2014–2015); Wake Forest (2016–2018); Ohio State (2018–2019)
- Playing career: 2019–present
- Position: Shooting guard

Career history
- 2019–2020: Feyenoord
- 2020–2021: Polski Cukier Toruń
- 2021: GTK Gliwice
- 2022: Iraklis Thessaloniki
- 2022–2023: Tindastóll
- 2023: OGM Ormanspor
- 2024: Tindastóll
- 2025: Cocodrilos de Caracas
- 2025–2026: Valur
- 2026: Santos del Potosí

Career highlights
- Icelandic champion (2023); Úrvalsdeild Playoffs MVP (2023)

Antonio Keyshawn Woods (born January 28, 1996) is an American professional basketball player. He played collegiately for Charlotte, Wake Forest and Ohio State. In 2023, he won the Icelandic championship with Tindastóll and was named the Playoffs MVP.

== College career ==
Woods averaged 8.4 points per game as a freshman at Charlotte. Following the season he transferred to Wake Forest. As a sophomore, Woods averaged 12.5 points, 4.2 rebounds and 3.5 assists per game. He averaged 12 points per game as a junior with a season high 25 points against Georgia Southern. Following the season, Woods transferred again to Ohio State. As a senior at Ohio State, Woods started 15 games and averaged 8.1 points, 2.5 assists and 3.1 rebounds per game while shooting 42 percent from the field.

== Professional career ==
On August 11, 2019, Woods signed with Feyenoord Basketball for the 2019–20 season. He averaged 16.7 points, 4.6 rebounds and 3.6 assists per game.

On September 8, 2020, he has signed with Polski Cukier Toruń of the Polish Basketball League (PLK).

On July 2, 2021, he signed with GTK Gliwice of the Polish Basketball League. Woods averaged 11.6 points, 3.1 assists, 2.9 rebounds, and 1.0 steal per game. He parted ways with the team on November 30.

On February 19, 2022, Woods signed with Iraklis of the Greek Basket League. In 5 games, he averaged 13.2 points, 2.8 rebounds and 2.2 assists, shooting with 46% from the 3-point line and playing around 30 minutes per contest.

In August 2022, Woods signed with Tindastóll of the Úrvalsdeild karla. On 18 May 2023, he won the Icelandic championship and was named the Playoffs MVP. In the fifth and deciding game of Tindastóll's finals series against Valur, an 81–82 win, Woods scored the last three points of the game from the free throw line with few seconds remaining in the game.

He played for OGM Ormanspor during the first half of the 2023–2024 season, averaging 15.7 points and 3.9 assists.

On 31 January, Tindastóll announced it had signed Woods again.

In March 2025, Woods signed with Cocodrilos de Caracas. In 22 games, he averaged 14.0 points and 3.9 rebounds per game.

In 1 December 2025, Woods returned to Iceland and signed with Valur.
