= Landstede Sportcentrum =

Indoor sports complex in Zwolle, Netherlands

- Theater van de Sport (Theatre of Sport)
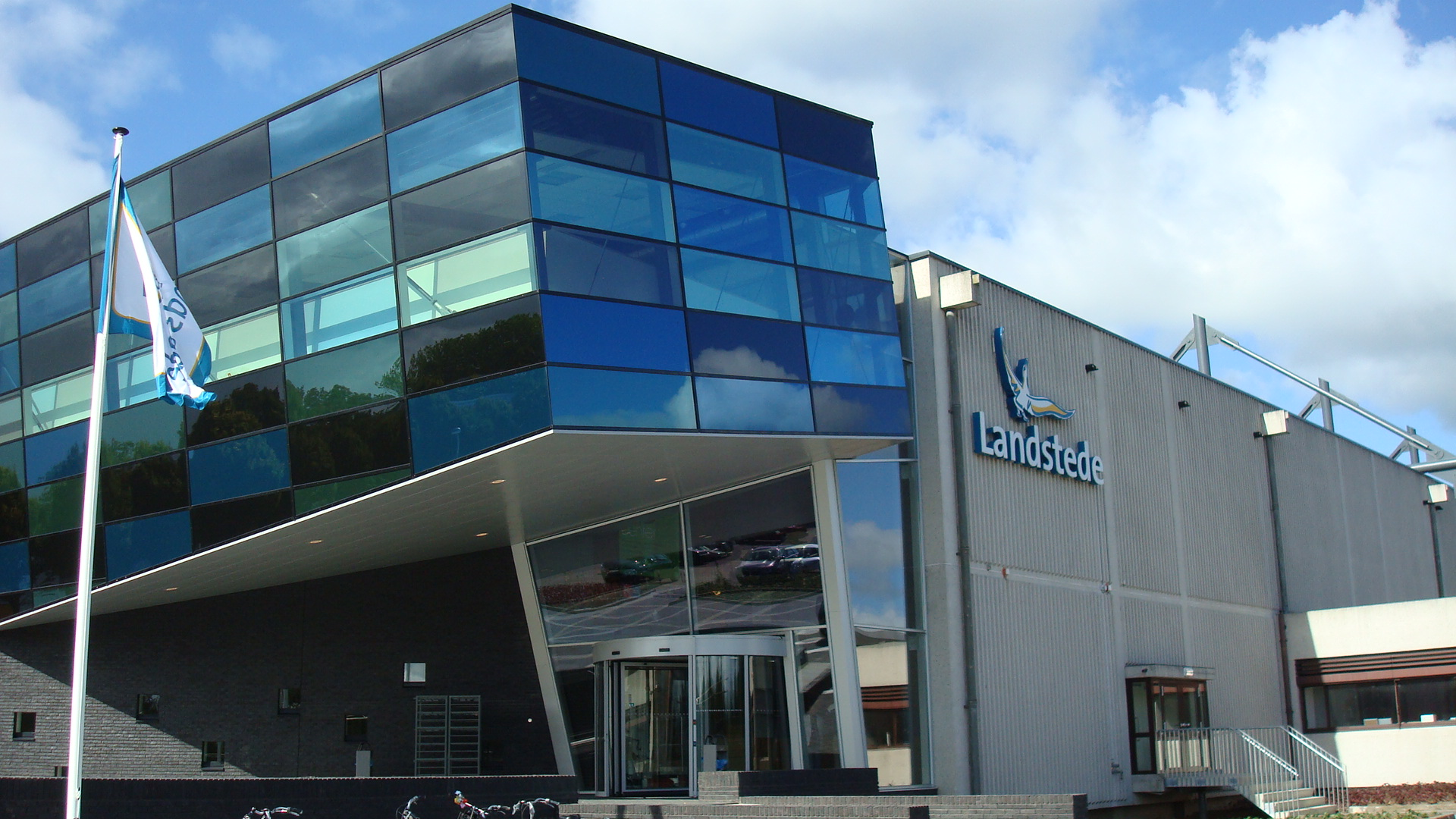
- Interactive map of Landstede Sportcentrum
- Full name: Landstede Sportcentrum Zwolle
- Location: Zwolle, Netherlands
- Coordinates: 52.5167°N 6.1000°E
- Owner: ROC Landstede
- Capacity: 1,200 (Basketball, Volleyball); 378; 126 (artistic gymnastics)

Construction
- Groundbreaking: 12 December 2008
- Built: 2008–2010
- Opened: 25 September 2010
- Architect: Wind Architecten Adviseurs

Tenants
- Landstede Hammers (2010–present); Landstede Volleybal (2010–2015)

Website
- www.landstedesportcentrum.nl

The Landstede Sportcentrum is an indoor sports complex located in Zwolle, Netherlands, which is used as a sports arena and was opened in 2010. It is the home of basketball team Landstede Hammers. The "centre court", which is used by both the club has a capacity of 1,200 people.

The complex is owned by ROC Landstede, an educational institution that is also main sponsor of the basketball and volleyball clubs. The Sportcentrum is also used for many other sports, like artistic gymnastics and table tennis. In 2011 and 2012, the international basketball tournament Basketball Days was held in the Sportcentrum.

It is nicknamed the Theater van de Sport (Theatre of Sport).

== Events ==
Basketball

- 2015 Landstede Brose Tournament
- Basketball Days
