= Coen Stolk =

Dutch basketball player (born 1997)

Personal information
- Born: 26 June 1997 (age 29) Dordrecht, Netherlands
- Listed height: 1.96 m (6 ft 5 in)
- Listed weight: 92 kg (203 lb)

Career information
- Playing career: 2014–2026
- Position: Small forward
- Number: 6

Career history
- 2014–2015: Landstede Zwolle
- 2015–2022: Feyenoord
- 2022–2026: Landstede Hammers

Coen Stolk (born 26 June 1997) is a Dutch former professional basketball player. He also plays for the Netherlands national team.

== Professional career ==
A product of the youth academy, Stolk started his career playing for Landstede Zwolle before signing with Feyenoord, then known as Rotterdam Basketball, in 2015.

Stolk averaged 6.7 points and 3.1 rebounds per game during the 2019–20 season. On 9 July 2020, Stolk extended his contract until 2022. In the 2021–22 season, he averaged a career-high 10.6 points per game with Feyenoord.

On 9 June 2022, Stolk signed with Landstede Hammers and thus returned to his former club.

On May 11, 2026, Coen Stolk announced his retirement from professional basketball with immediate effect after suffering four concussions, with medical advice deeming it unsafe for him to continue playing.

== National team career ==
Stolk has played for the Netherlands under-20 team at the 2016 FIBA U20 European Championship Division B in Greece.

On 25 February 2023, Stolk made his debut for the Netherlands senior team in a home game against Georgia.
