= Landstede Hammers =

- Leagues: BNXT League
- Founded: 1995; 31 years ago
- History: List: Cees Lubbers The Hammers (1995–1996) Landstede Hammers (1996–1999) Landstede Basketbal (1999–2019) Landstede Hammers (2019–present)
- Arena: Landstede Sportcentrum
- Capacity: 1,200
- Location: Zwolle, Netherlands
- Main sponsor: Landstede
- President: Gerrard Vinke
- General manager: Aleksandar Todorov
- Head coach: Gaëlle Bouzin
- Team captain: Boyd van der Vuurst de Vries
- 2025–26 position: BNXT League, 14th of 21
- Championships: 2 Dutch League; 3 Dutch Supercups
- Retired numbers: 2 (7, 42)
- Website: landstedehammers.nl
Home	Away	Third

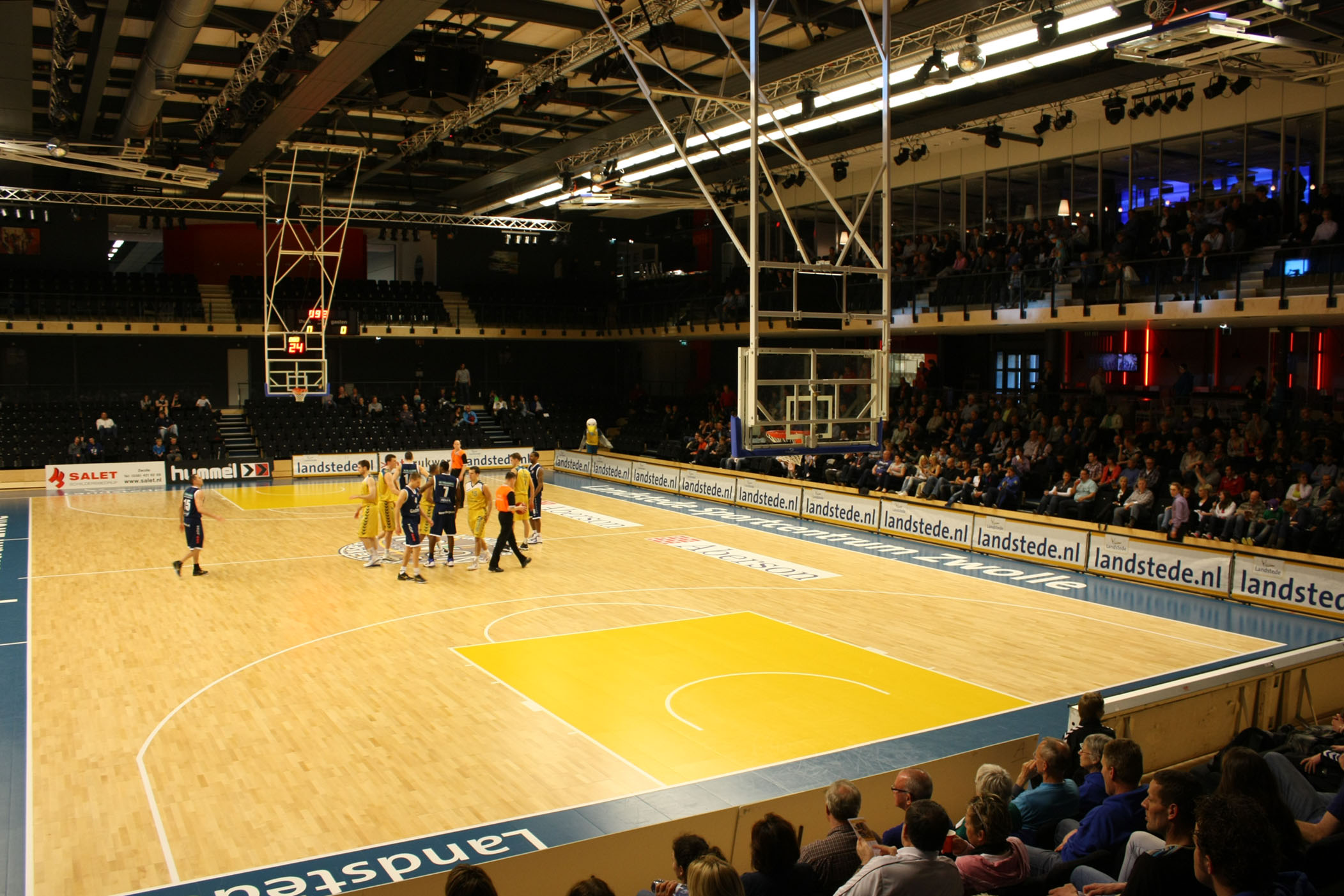
Landstede Basketbal game in 2011

Landstede Hammers is a Dutch basketball club based in Zwolle. The club plays in the BNXT League, the Dutch top tier division. The club was founded as Cees Lubbers The Hammers in 1995. In 1999, the club’s name was changed into Landstede Hammers. In 2001, the club received its current name Landstede Basketbal as the team became part of the same-named educational institution in Zwolle. The home games of the club are played in the Landstede Sportcentrum.

In its existence, Landstede won the Dutch championship two times, in 2019 and 2026. In 2017, the club captured its first trophy when it won the Dutch Supercup.

== History ==
The club was founded as Cees Lubbers/The Hammers and was based in Meppel in the first season of the club. The club played with the license of Red Giants Meppel, and moved to Zwolle, partly because arena 'Het Vledder' in Meppel diid not meet requirements. After a short time Landstede became the main sponsor of the club, that was named Landstede Hammers and later Landstede Basketbal. In the 2004–05 season Landstede reached the Dutch Finals for the first time in club history. It lost 4–0 to Amsterdam. In 2010 the club got a new arena in the Landstede Sportcentrum.

In 2017, Landstede won its first trophy in team history by winning the Dutch Supercup over Donar, winning 77–69.

In the 2018–19 season, Landstede finished in the second place in the regular season. The team had a 28–6 record in the regular season, and had All-DBL Team performers Noah Dahlman and Kaza Kajami-Keane on its roster. In the playoffs, Landstede defeated New Heroes Den Bosch 1–3 in the semi-finals. In the finals, Landstede beat defending champions Donar to win its first domestic championship.

On 22 September 2019, Hammers won its second Supercup trophy after beating ZZ Leiden 78–66 in its home arena. In the 2019–20 season, Landstede played in the FIBA Europe Cup, which marked the club's first European appearance in 19 years. On 19 August 2019, the club announced they returned to the name Landstede Hammers. In its first FIBA Europe Cup season, Landstede advanced past the regular season before losing six straight games in the second round.

Since the 2021–22 season, Hammers plays in the BNXT League, in which the national leagues of Belgium and the Netherlands have been merged.

The Hammers will join the European North Basketball League (ENBL) in the 2023-24 season, which makes them the first Dutch team to play in the league.

== Club identity ==
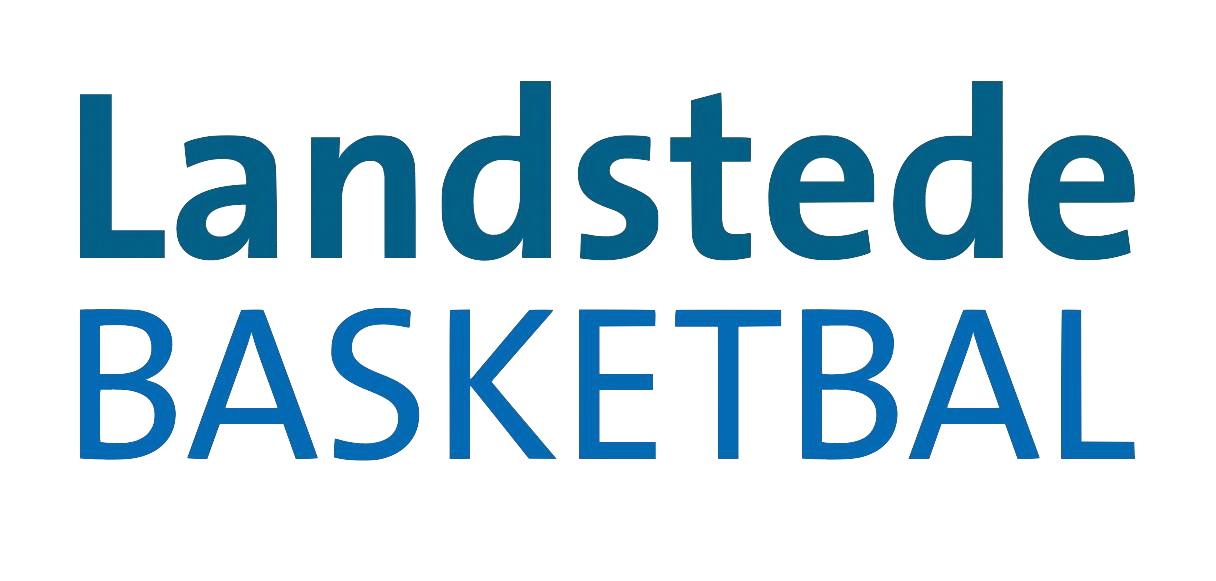
Landstede Basketbal used until 2019

When founded, the club was named Cees Lubbers The Hammers, named after main sponsor Cees Lubbers. The name Hammers stayed with the team through its supporters, who used its nickname for the following years. From 1996, the team was known as Landstede Hammers after new sponsor Landstede. In 1999, the club was named Landstede Basketbal, a name they kept for 20 years. On 19 August 2019, the club announced they returned to the name Landstede Hammers.

The team has a supporters' club which was founded in 2016 and is known as SV Hammers.

The mascot of the Hammers is the bird "Victory".

== Honours ==
=== Domestic competitions ===
- Dutch Basketball League
  - Winners (2): 2018–19, 2025–26
  - Runners-up (3): 2004–05, 2015–16, 2016–17
- Dutch Cup
  - Runners-up (7): 2004–05, 2012–13, 2016–17, 2018–19, 2022–23, 2023–24, 2025–26
- Dutch Supercup
  - Winners (3): 2017, 2019, 2026

=== Friendly competitions ===
- Basketball Days
  - Winners (2): 2011, 2012

== Players ==
=== Retired numbers ===
Landstede Hammers retired numbers
N°	Player	Position	Tenure	Ceremony date
7	Nigel van Oostrum	Guard	2016–2022	30 April 2022
42	Noah Dahlman	Center	2017–2022	30 April 2025

=== Current roster ===
Landstede Hammers roster
Players
Coaches

Pos.	No.	Nat.	Name	Ht.	Age
SG	2	(Netherlands)	Olsthoorn, Jasper	1.94 m (6 ft 4 in)	18 – 25 November 2007
G	3	(Netherlands)	van Vliet, Boy	1.94 m (6 ft 4 in)	32 – 13 July 1994
PG	4	(Netherlands)	Saveljic, Marko	1.87 m (6 ft 2 in)	19 – 23 July 2007
SF	5	(United States)	Abidde, Isaac	2.03 m (6 ft 8 in)	23 – 10 April 2003
F	9	(United States)	Whitfield, Devin	1.96 m (6 ft 5 in)	28 – 10 March 1998
PG	13	(Netherlands)	van der Vuurst de Vries, Boyd	1.90 m (6 ft 3 in)	27 – 16 August 1999
F	20	(United States)	Haskin, Nelson	2.01 m (6 ft 7 in)	27 – 6 August 1999
PF	22	(United States)	Johnson, Isaiah	1.98 m (6 ft 6 in)	25 – 11 October 2001
G	24	(Netherlands)	Weijers, Tim	1.89 m (6 ft 2 in)	17 – 22 July 2009
PG	37	(Netherlands)	van Oostrum, Sam	1.97 m (6 ft 6 in)	27 – 14 December 1998
G/F	82	(United States)	Counter, J’Lynn	1.91 m (6 ft 3 in)	23 – 9 January 2003
PF		(United States)	Fields, Faizon	2.08 m (6 ft 10 in)	24 – 1 January 2002

Head coach

- (Belgium) Gaëlle Bouzin

Assistant coach(es)

- (Denmark) Viktor Rævehøj
- (Netherlands) Damian Boomstra

Legend

- (C) Team captain
- (DC) Dual citizenship
- (DP) Development player
- (I) Import player
- Injured

- Roster
Updated: November 22, 2026

=== Notable players ===
Note: Flags indicate national team eligibility at FIBA-sanctioned events. Players may hold other non-FIBA nationalities not displayed.

Criteria

To appear in this section a player must have either:

- Set a club record or won an individual award while at the club
- Played at least one official international match for their national team at any time
- Played at least one official NBA match at any time.

- (Canada) Kaza Kajami-Keane
- (Canada) Tyson Hinz
- (United States) Noah Dahlman
- (United States) Grant Gibbs
- (United States) Robby Bostain
- (United States) Josh Magette
- (United States) Zack Novak
- (United States) Justin Stommes
- (United States) Clayton Vette
- (United States) J. T. Tiller
- (United States) Darryl Webb
- (United States) Joe Burton
- (Netherlands) Leon Williams
- (Netherlands) Craig Osaikhwuwuomwan
- (Netherlands) Jessey Voorn
- (Netherlands) Nick Oudendag
- (Netherlands) Rein van der Kamp
- (Netherlands) Coen Stolk

=== Individual awards ===
DBL Play-offs MVP

- Kaza Kajami-Keane – 2019
- Jalen Thomas – 2026

All-DBL Team

- Greg Stevenson – 2005
- Darnell Hinson – 2006
- Zack Novak – 2013
- Joe Burton – 2015
- Grant Gibbs – 2016
- Tyson Hinz – 2016
- J.T. Tiller – 2017
- Clayton Vette – 2017
- Noah Dahlman – 2018, 2019
- Kaza Kajami-Keane – 2019

DBL Coach of the Year

- Herman van den Belt – 2002, 2005, 2016

DBL Defensive Player of the Year

- J.T. Tiller – 2017

DBL Rookie of the Year

- Freek Vos – 2016
- Olaf Schaftenaar – 2017

DBL MVP Under 23

- Leon Williams – 2012

DBL Most Improved Player

- Grant Gibbs – 2016

DBL Statistical Player of the Year

- Joe Burton – 2015

== Club records ==
Bold denotes still active with team. As of 14 April 2021:

Category	Player	Record
Games played	Alexandre De Sa	336
Points scored	Nikki Hulzebos	2,211
Rebounds	Nikki Hulzebos	1,464
Assists	Scott Ungerer	664
Steals	Nikki Hulzebos	320
Blocks	Nikki Hulzebos	168
Three-point field goals	Sherron Dorsey-Walker	244

== European record ==
Season	Competition	Round	Club	Home	Away	Agg
2000–01	FIBA Korać Cup	First round	(Portugal) CAB Madeira	67–68	74–84	141–152
2019–20	FIBA Europe Cup	Regular season	(Israel) Ironi Nes Ziona	88–94	90–96	2nd
2019–20	FIBA Europe Cup	Regular season	(Austria) Kapfenberg Bulls	89–64	100–67	2nd
2019–20	FIBA Europe Cup	Regular season	(Cyprus) Keravnos	78–72	85–88	2nd
2019–20	FIBA Europe Cup	Second Round	(Latvia) Ventspils	87–89	74–111	4th
2019–20	FIBA Europe Cup	Second Round	(Ukraine) Kyiv-Basket	68–77	76–89	4th
2019–20	FIBA Europe Cup	Second Round	(Hungary) Körmend	90–94	80–87	4th
2023–24	European North Basketball League	Regular season	(Lithuania) Juventus Utena	—	56–84	5th
2023–24	European North Basketball League	Regular season	(Denmark) Bakken Bears	—	56–52	5th
2023–24	European North Basketball League	Regular season	(Estonia) Tartu Ülikooli	78–97	—	5th
2023–24	European North Basketball League	Regular season	(United Kingdom) Bristol Flyers	—	56–68	5th
2023–24	European North Basketball League	Regular season	(Poland) Start Lublin	—	93–91	5th
2023–24	European North Basketball League	Regular season	(Denmark) Svendborg Rabbits	77–62	—	5th
2023–24	European North Basketball League	Regular season	(Bulgaria) Spartak Pleven	86–80	—	5th
2026–27	Basketball Champions League	Qualifying round QF	(Denmark) Bakken Bears	**78–89**		

Notes

1. Landstede points are listed first.

== Arenas ==
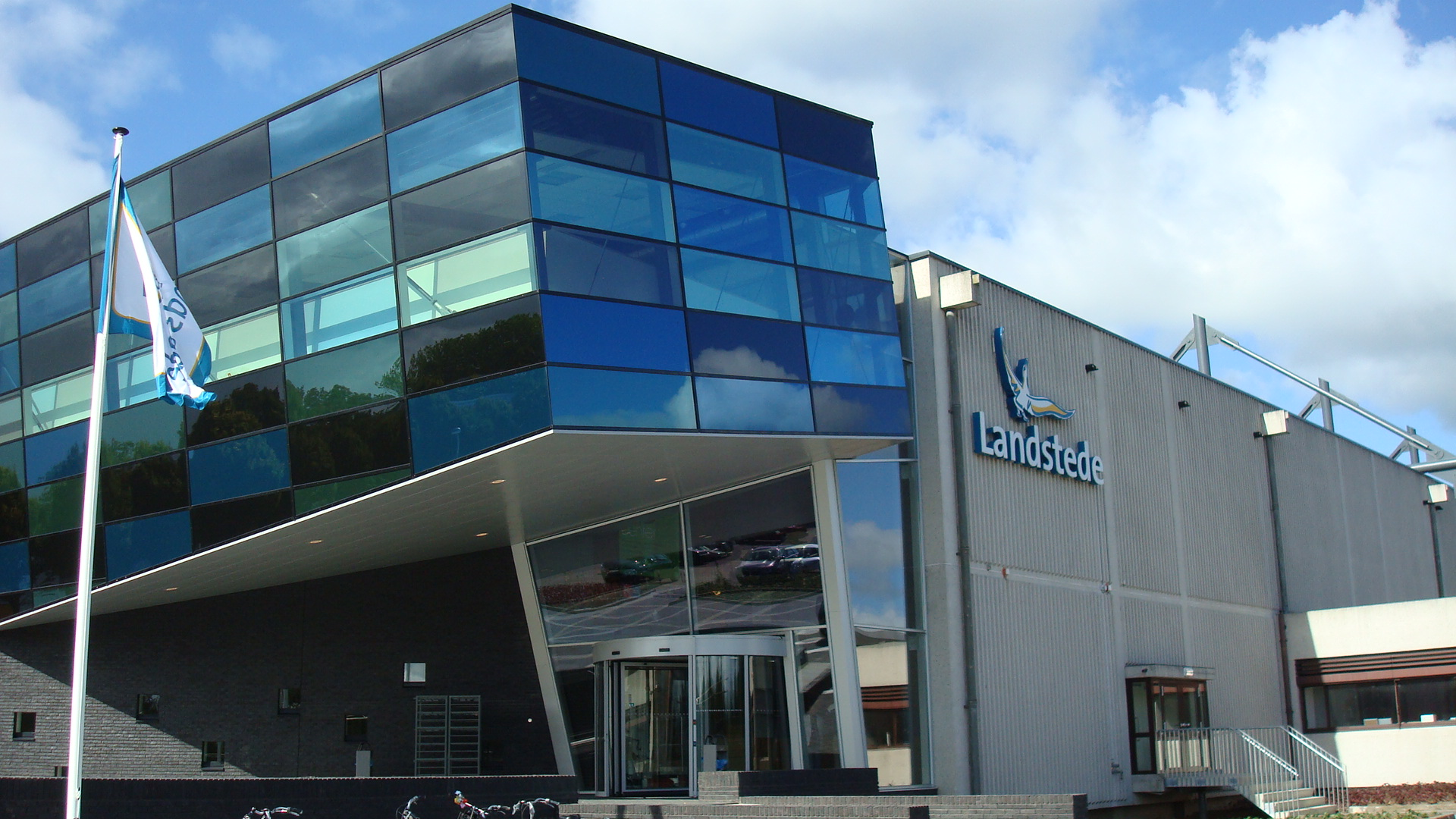
The Landstede Sports Center has been the club's home arena since 2010

Arenas
Arena	City	Tenure
Het Vledder	Meppel	1995–1996
Stilohal	Zwolle	1996–2010
Landstede Sportcentrum	Zwolle	2010–present

== Season by season ==
Season	Tier	League	Regular season					National playoffs	Basketball Cup				European competitions		
Season	Tier	League	Finish	Pld	W	L	Win%	National playoffs	Pld	W	L	Result			
1995–96	1	Eredivisie	8th												
1996–97	1	Eredivisie	7th												
1997–98	1	Eredivisie	7th												
1998–99	1	Eredivisie	8th												
1999–00	1	Eredivisie	4th												
2000–01	1	Eredivisie	11th										**3** Korać Cup	R1	0–2
2001–02	1	Eredivisie	5th												
2002–03	1	Eredivisie	8th												
2003–04	1	Eredivisie	5th												
2004–05	1	Eredivisie	2nd									Runner-up			
2005–06	1	Eredivisie	5th												
2006–07	1	Eredivisie	10th												
2007–08	1	Eredivisie	7th												
2008–09	1	Eredivisie	9th												
2009–10	1	Eredivisie	9th												
2010–11	1	DBL	9th									Fourth round			
2011–12	1	DBL	5th	28	12	16	.429	2nd in Group B of the second stage (2–2) Lost semifinals (Leiden, 1–3)				Semifinalist			
2012–13	1	DBL	5th	36	19	17	.528	Lost quarterfinals (Aris, 0–3)				Runner-up			
2013–14	1	DBL	5th	36	22	14	.611	Lost quarterfinals (Leiden, 1–2)				Quarterfinalist			
2014–15	1	DBL	4th	28	20	8	.714	**Won** quarterfinals (Rotterdam, 2–0) Lost semifinals (Den Bosch, 4–3)				Semifinalist			
2015–16	1	DBL	1st	28	22	6	.786	**Won** semifinals (Den Bosch, 4–2) Lost finals (Donar, 1–4)				Semifinalist			
2016–17	1	DBL	2nd	28	20	8	.714	**Won** semifinals (Leiden, 4–3) Lost finals (Donar, 1–4)				Runner-up			
2017–18	1	DBL	2nd	34	24	8	.750	Lost semifinals (Leiden, 0–4)				Semifinalist			
2018–19	1	DBL	2nd	34	28	6	.824	**Won** quarterfinals (Aris, 2–0); **Won** semifinals (Den Bosch, 3–1); **Won** finals (Donar, 4–2)				Runners-up			
2019–20	1	DBL	1st (Note: The 2019–20 season was cancelled in March 2020 because of the COVID-19 pandemic. At the time, Landstede was first in the standings but no champion was named.)	20	17	3	.850	Cancelled due to the COVID-19 pandemic				Semifinalist	**4** FIBA Europe Cup	T16	3–9
2020–21	1	DBL	4th	21	13	8	.619	**Won** quarterfinals (Feyenoord, 180–158) Lost semifinals (Leiden, 1–2)				Semifinalist			
2021–22	1	BNXT League	9th	30	14	16	.467	**Won** quarterfinals (Feyenoord, 2–0) Lost semifinals (Leiden, 0–3)	3	1	2	Quarterfinalist			
2022–23	1	BNXT League	7th	30	14	14	.500	Lost quarterfinals (Aris, 1–2)	4	3	1	Runners-up			
2023–24	1	BNXT League	8th	26	12	14	.462	**Won** quarterfinals (LWD Basket, 2–0) Lost semifinals (ZZ Leiden, 3–0)	4	3	1	Runners-up	ENBL	RS	4–3
2024–25	1	BNXT League	16th	36	12	24	.333	Lost quarterfinals (ZZ Leiden, 2–0)	2	1	1	Quarterfinalist			
2025–26	1	BNXT League	14th	34	14	20	.412	**Won** quarterfinals (Den Helder, 2–0); **Won** semifinals (Den Bosch, 3–1); **Won** finals (Leiden, 3–1)	4	3	1	Runners-up			
2026–27	1	BNXT League										Eigthfinalist	**3** Champions League	QT	0–1

== Head coaches ==
The Hammers have had four different head coaches in their history, with Herman van den Belt coaching the team the most seasons.

Dates	Name	Honours	Notes
1996–2000	(Netherlands) Marco van den Berg	–	–
2000	(Germany) Peter Krüsmann	–	–
2000–2009	(Netherlands) Herman van den Belt		
2009–2010	(Netherlands) Marten Scheepstra		
2010–2023	(Netherlands) Herman van den Belt	DBL champion: 2019; Dutch Supercup: 2017, 2019	
2023	(Netherlands) Mark van Schutterhoef		
2023–2024	(Belgium) Jean-Marc Jaumin		
2024–present	(Belgium) Gaëlle Bouzin	DBL champion: 2026; Dutch Supercup: 2026	
