= Fernando Martín (basketball) =

Spanish basketball player (1962–1989)

- Martín during a game

Personal information
- Born: March 25, 1962 Madrid, Spain
- Died: December 3, 1989 (aged 27) Madrid, Spain
- Listed height: 6 ft 9 in (2.06 m)
- Listed weight: 220 lb (100 kg)

Career information
- NBA draft: 1985: 2nd round, 38th overall pick
- Drafted by: New Jersey Nets
- Playing career: 1979–1989
- Position: Center / power forward
- Number: 10

Career history
- 1979–1981: Estudiantes Mudespa
- 1981–1986: Real Madrid
- 1986–1987: Portland Trail Blazers
- 1987–1989: Real Madrid

Career highlights
- FIBA Club World Cup champion (1981); 3× FIBA European Super Cup champion (1984, 1988, 1989); 2× FIBA Saporta Cup champion (1984, 1989); FIBA Korać Cup champion (1988); 4× Spanish League champion (1982 LEB, 1984–1986 ACB); Spanish Supercup winner (1984); 3× Spanish King's Cup winner (1985, 1986, 1989); FIBA's 50 Greatest Players (1991); No. 10 retired by Real Madrid
- Stats at NBA.com
- Stats at Basketball Reference
- FIBA Hall of Fame
Medals
Men's basketball
Representing Spain
Olympic Games
Silver medal – second place	1984 Los Angeles
EuroBasket
Silver medal – second place	1983 France
European Championship for Cadets
Bronze medal – third place	1979 Syria	Under-16

Fernando Martín Espina (March 25, 1962 – December 3, 1989) was a Spanish professional basketball player who was considered to be one of the best Spanish basketball players ever. Martín was 2.06 m (6 ft 9 in) tall, and he played primarily at the center and power forward positions. He was considered a talented all-around athlete. He was a five-time swimming champion in Spain, as well as being a highly ranked athlete in the sports of handball, table tennis and judo.

Martín wore the number 10 jersey, which Real Madrid retired after his death. He was named one of FIBA's 50 Greatest Players, in 1991. In 2007, he was enshrined into the FIBA Hall of Fame.

== Professional career ==
Martín was the first Spanish player to play in the National Basketball Association (NBA), in 1986, and was also the second European to play in the league. He played for the Portland Trail Blazers and, earlier, in Spain for Estudiantes and Real Madrid. He played in 24 games in the 1986–87 NBA season for the Blazers, and was injured for two months of his Blazers stint. At the end of the season, he returned to Spain, to play again for Real Madrid.

== National team career ==
Martín also played for the senior Spanish national team, and he was a prominent player in the Spanish team that won the silver medal at the 1984 Los Angeles Summer Olympic Games. Martín also represented his country at the 1981 EuroBasket, the 1983 EuroBasket, where he won a silver medal, and the 1985 EuroBasket, where he was selected to the All-Tournament Team.

== Death ==
Martín died in a car accident in the M-30 motorway in Madrid after crashing his car.

== Personal life ==
His son, Jan Martín, made a start in the top-tier level Spanish pro league, the ACB, with Estudiantes, in the 2002–03 season, and he also played with the Spanish national junior teams. His nephew, Dominick Martín, played college basketball for the Yale Bulldogs, and also played professionally in Spain. His brother, Antonio Martín Espina, was also a professional basketball player.

For his first dunk in the 2009 NBA All-Star Slam Dunk Contest, Portland Trail Blazers' player Rudy Fernández, wore a #10 Martín Blazers jersey, in his honor.

== Career statistics ==
Legend
GP	Games played	GS	Games started	MPG	Minutes per game
FG%	Field goal percentage	3P%	3-point field goal percentage	FT%	Free throw percentage
RPG	Rebounds per game	APG	Assists per game	SPG	Steals per game
BPG	Blocks per game	PPG	Points per game	**Bold**	Career high

=== NBA ===
==== Regular season ====
Year	Team	GP	GS	MPG	FG%	3P%	FT%	RPG	APG	SPG	BPG	PPG
1986–87	Portland	24	0	6.1	.290	.000	.364	1.2	.4	.3	.0	.9

==== Playoffs ====
Year	Team	GP	GS	MPG	FG%	3P%	FT%	RPG	APG	SPG	BPG	PPG
1987	Portland	1	0	1.0	.000	–	–	.0	.0	.0	.0	.0

== See also ==
- List of basketball players who died during their careers
