= Fernando Romay =

Spanish basketball player

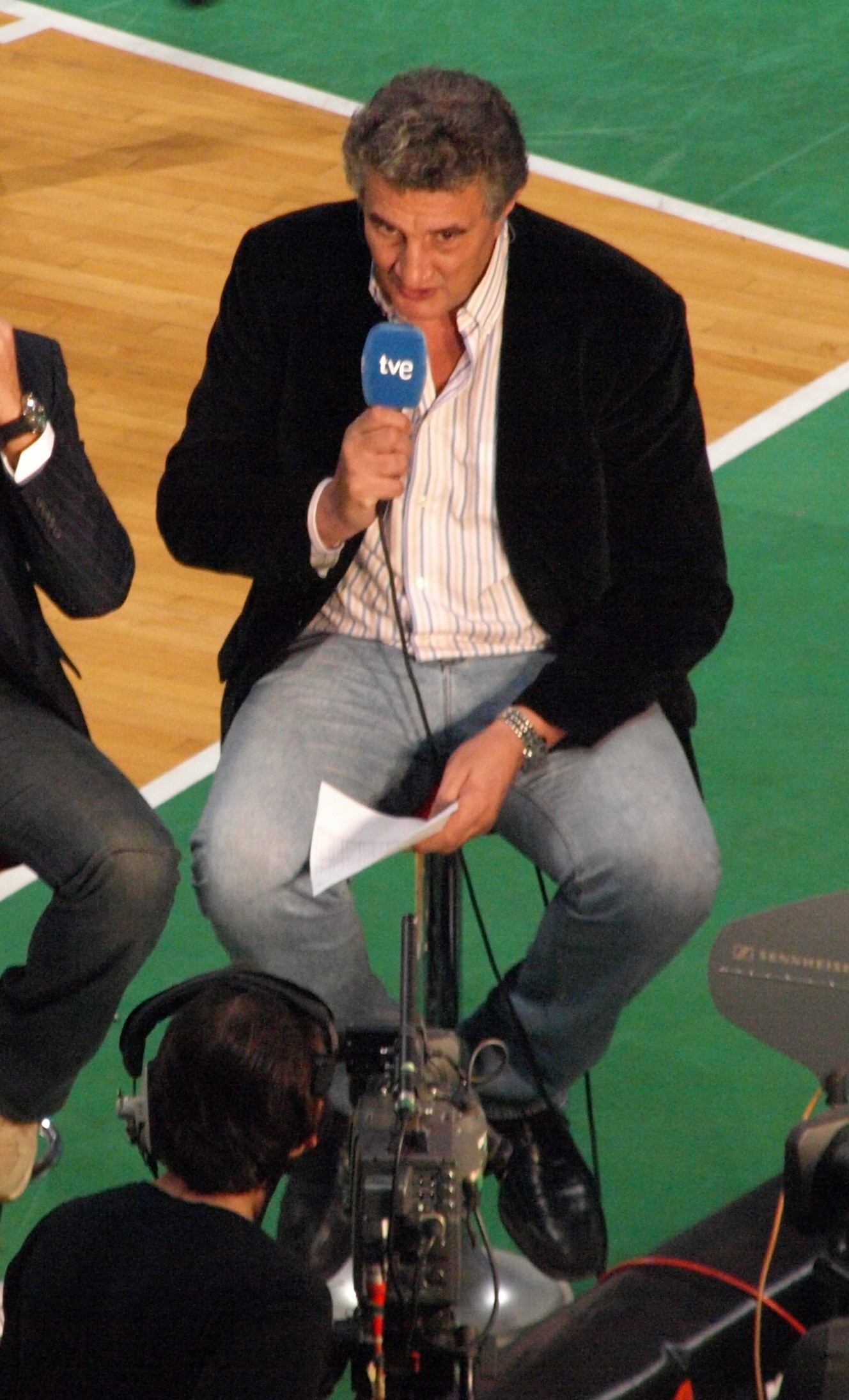
- Romay in 2008

Personal information
- Born: 23 September 1959 (age 67) A Coruña, Spain
- Listed height: 2.13 m (7 ft 0 in)
- Listed weight: 141 kg (311 lb)

Career information
- Playing career: 1976–1995
- Position: Center

Career history
- 1976–1993: Real Madrid
- 1993–1994: OAR Ferrol
- 1994–1995: Zaragoza

Career highlights
- 4× FIBA Intercontinental Cup champion (1976–1978, 1981); 3× FIBA European Super Cup champion (1984, 1988, 1989); 2× EuroLeague champion (1978, 1980); 3× FIBA Saporta Cup champion (1984, 1989, 1992); FIBA Korać Cup champion (1988); 8× Spanish League champion (LEB 1977, 1979, 1980, 1982; ACB 1984–1986, 1993); 5× Spanish Cup winner (1977, 1985, 1986, 1989, 1993); Spanish Supercup winner (1984); Royal Order of Sports Merit (1988)
Medals
Men's basketball
Representing Spain
Summer Olympics
Silver medal – second place	1984 Los Angeles
EuroBasket
Silver medal – second place	1983 France
European U-18 Championship
Bronze medal – third place	1976 Spain	U-18 Spain
Bronze medal – third place	1978 Italy	U-18 Spain

Fernando Manuel Romay Pereiro (born 23 September 1959) is a Spanish retired professional basketball player, who represented his native country in two consecutive Summer Olympic Games, starting in 1980. At his second Olympic appearance, in 1984, he won the silver medal with the Spain's national basketball team. He is considered to be one of the best players in Real Madrid history, and also one of the best players in Spanish basketball history. He stands around 7 ft tall.

== Professional basketball club career ==
During his club career, Romay won numerous international titles. As a member of Real Madrid, he won four FIBA Intercontinental Cup championships (1976, 1977, 1978, 1981), three FIBA European Super Cup championships (1984, 1988, 1989), two EuroLeague championships (1978, 1980), three FIBA Saporta Cup championships (1984, 1989, 1992), and the FIBA Korać Cup championship in 1988. With Real Madrid, he also won eight Spanish League championships in total.

He won four Spanish LEB Primera División championships (1977, 1979, 1980, 1982), and four Spanish ACB League championships (1984, 1985, 1986, 1993). He also won five Spanish Cup titles (1977, 1985, 1986, 1989, 1993), and the Spanish Supercup in 1984.

Romay was the Spanish ACB League's all-time leader in blocked shots with 671, until Fran Vázquez surpassed his record on 17 April 2016.

== National team basketball career ==
Romay was a member of the senior Spanish national basketball team. With Spain, he played at the 1980 Summer Olympics, and at the 1984 Summer Olympics, where he won a silver medal.

He also represented Spain at the following major FIBA tournaments: the 1981 EuroBasket, the 1982 FIBA World Cup, the 1983 EuroBasket, where he won a silver medal, at the 1985 EuroBasket, the 1986 FIBA World Cup, the 1987 EuroBasket, and the 1990 FIBA World Cup.

== American football playing career ==
After his retirement from playing professional basketball, in October 1995, Romay became an American football player with Madrid Panteras, and on 8 June 1996, he won the Spanish league Bowl. He did not play any minutes in the finals game against the Vilafranca Eagles.

== Television career ==
Romay makes regular appearances on Spanish television on programmes, such as Mira Quien Baila!, which is the Spanish version of Dancing with the Stars.
