= Ramón Mendoza =

Spanish lawyer and businessman

13th president of Real Madrid
- In office 24 May 1985 – 26 November 1995
- Preceded by: Luis de Carlos
- Succeeded by: Lorenzo Sanz

Personal details
- Born: Ramón Mendoza Fontela; 18 April 1927 Madrid, Kingdom of Spain
- Died: 4 April 2001 (aged 73) Nassau, The Bahamas
- Occupation: Lawyer, businessman

Ramón Mendoza Fontela (18 April 1927 – 4 April 2001) was a Spanish lawyer and businessman who is mostly known for serving as the 13th president of Real Madrid from 24 May 1985 until 26 November 1995. He was born in Madrid, Kingdom of Spain.

== President of Real Madrid ==
Mendoza became president of Real Madrid on 24 May 1985 when he was the only candidate at the elections for chairman of the club. He once again had no opponent in the next elections on 23 July 1988. Mendoza beat opposing candidate Alfonso Ussía by 20% of the votes (15,005 to 10,531) in January 1991 to secure his third term. He won a fourth term in 1994. In the elections which were dominated by accusations of fraud, corruption and mismanagement of the club, he nevertheless managed to beat Florentino Pérez by 700 votes.

His first years leading the club were very successful and saw the rise of the La Quinta del Buitre. Real Madrid won a record 5 consecutive league titles and was considered one of the best teams in Europe at the time. However, the club never managed to win the European Cup during those years, losing memorable ties to such clubs as Bayern Munich, PSV Eindhoven and Arrigo Sacchi's Milan. The second half of Mendoza's presidency was marked by a slow decline in the achievements of the club, a fact that was highlighted by a very strong Barcelona team.

In 1995, he was forced to give up the presidency after admitting that the club had a debt of 14 million pesetas. He was succeeded by Lorenzo Sanz, who had been vice-president during his last term.

Mendoza's ten years at the helm of the club make his presidency the third longest in the history of Real Madrid after the presidencies of Santiago Bernabéu (1943–1978) and Florentino Pérez (2009–present). Bernabéu and Pérez are also the only presidents to accumulate more trophies than Mendoza with the club. In total with Mendoza as president, Real Madrid won 6 league titles, 2 Spanish Cups, 3 Super Cups, and 1 UEFA Cup.

== Death ==
Mendoza died at the age of 73 on 4 April 2001 while on holidays in Nassau, the Bahamas.

== Honours ==
=== Football ===
Real Madrid:

- La Liga:
  - 1985–86, 1986–87, 1987–88, 1988–89, 1989–90, 1994–95
- Copa del Rey:
  - 1988–89, 1992–93
- Supercopa de España:
  - 1988, 1989, 1990, 1993
- UEFA Cup:
  - 1985–86
- Copa Iberoamericana:
  - 1994

=== Basketball ===
Real Madrid Basketball:

- Liga ACB:
  - 1985–86, 1992–93, 1993–94
- Copa del Rey de Baloncesto:
  - 1986, 1989, 1993
- FIBA European League:
  - 1994–95
- FIBA European Cup Winners' Cup / FIBA European Cup:
  - 1988–89, 1991–92
- FIBA Korać Cup:
  - 1987–88
- European Basketball Club Super Cup:
  - 1988, 1989
