= 1986 IV ACB International Tournament "III Memorial Héctor Quiroga" =

- Sport: Basketball
- Finals champions: (Spain) FC Barcelona
- Runners-up: (Spain) Real Madrid

European Basketball Club Super Cup seasons
- ← 1985 III ACB International Tournament "II Memorial Héctor Quiroga" 1986 FIBA European Super Cup 1987 V ACB International Tournament "IV Memorial Héctor Quiroga" →

The 1986 IV ACB International Tournament "III Memorial Héctor Quiroga" was the 4th semi-official edition of the European Basketball Club Super Cup. It took place at Pabellón Municipal de Puerto Real, Puerto Real, Spain, on 5, 6 and 7 September 1986 with the participations of Cibona (champions of the 1985–86 FIBA European Champions Cup), FC Barcelona (champions of the 1985–86 FIBA European Cup Winner's Cup), Real Madrid (champions of the 1985–86 Liga ACB) and Tracer Milano (champions of the 1985–86 Serie A1 FIP). A month later, took place and an alternate and more official edition under the auspices of FIBA, between Cibona and FC Barcelona.

== League stage ==
Day 1, September 05, 1986

Team 1	Score	Team 2
Real Madrid (Spain)	97–84	(Socialist Federal Republic of Yugoslavia) Cibona
FC Barcelona (Spain)	100–91	(Italy) Tracer Milano

Day 2, September 06, 1986

Team 1	Score	Team 2
FC Barcelona (Spain)	107–103	(Socialist Federal Republic of Yugoslavia) Cibona
Real Madrid (Spain)	97–85	(Italy) Tracer Milano

Day 3, September 07, 1986

Team 1	Score	Team 2
FC Barcelona (Spain)	97–87	(Spain) Real Madrid
Cibona (Socialist Federal Republic of Yugoslavia)	100–76	(Italy) Tracer Milano

== Final standings ==
	Team	Pld	Pts	W	L	PF	PA	PD
1.	(Spain) FC Barcelona	3	6	3	0	304	281	+23
2.	(Spain) Real Madrid	3	5	2	1	281	266	+15
3.	(Socialist Federal Republic of Yugoslavia) Cibona	3	4	1	2	287	280	+7
4.	(Italy) Tracer Milano	3	3	0	3	252	297	–45

1986 IV ACB International Tournament "III Memorial Héctor Quiroga" Champions

FC Barcelona
2nd title
