= 1991 IX ACB International Tournament "VIII Memorial Héctor Quiroga" =

- Sport: Basketball
- Finals champions: (Israel) Maccabi Elite Tel Aviv
- Runners-up: (Spain) Montigalà Joventut

European Basketball Club Super Cup seasons
- ← 1990 VIII ACB International Tournament "VII Memorial Héctor Quiroga"

The 1991 ACB International Tournament (9th Edition)- "8th Memorial Héctor Quiroga" was the 9th semi-official edition of the European Basketball Club Super Cup. It took place at Pabellón Municipal de Puerto Real, Puerto Real, Spain, on 6, 7 and 8 September 1991 with the participation of Slobodna Dalmacija (champions of the 1990–91 FIBA European Champions Cup), FC Barcelona Banca Catalana (runners-up of the 1990–91 FIBA European Champions Cup), Montigalà Joventut (champions of the 1990–91 Liga ACB) and Maccabi Elite Tel Aviv (champions of the 1990–91 Premier League).

== League stage ==
Day 1, September 6, 1991

Team 1	Score	Team 2
Montigalà Joventut (Spain)	75–73	(Croatia) Slobodna Dalmacija
FC Barcelona Banca Catalana (Spain)	64–77	(Israel) Maccabi Elite Tel Aviv

Day 2, September 7, 1991

Team 1	Score	Team 2
Montigalà Joventut (Spain)	77–71	(Spain) FC Barcelona Banca Catalana
Slobodna Dalmacija (Croatia)	71–99	(Israel) Maccabi Elite Tel Aviv

Day 3, September 8, 1991

Team 1	Score	Team 2
FC Barcelona Banca Catalana (Spain)	68–65	(Croatia) Slobodna Dalmacija
Montigalà Joventut (Spain)	74–83	(Israel) Maccabi Elite Tel Aviv

== Final standings ==
	Team	Pld	Pts	W	L	PF	PA	PD
1.	(Israel) Maccabi Elite Tel Aviv	3	6	3	0	259	209	+50
2.	(Spain) Montigalà Joventut	3	5	2	1	226	227	–1
3.	(Spain) FC Barcelona Banca Catalana	3	4	1	2	203	219	–16
4.	(Croatia) Slobodna Dalmacija	3	3	0	3	209	242	–33

1991 IX ACB International Tournament "VIII Memorial Héctor Quiroga" Champions

Maccabi Elite Tel Aviv
1st title
