= 1985 III ACB International Tournament "II Memorial Héctor Quiroga" =

- Sport: Basketball
- Finals champions: (United States) Winston All Star
- Runners-up: (France) Limoges CSP

European Basketball Club Super Cup seasons
- ← 1984 II ACB International Tournament "I Memorial Héctor Quiroga" 1986 IV ACB International Tournament "III Memorial Héctor Quiroga" →

The 1985 III ACB International Tournament "II Memorial Héctor Quiroga" was the 3rd semi-official edition of the European Basketball Club Super Cup. It took place at Pabellón Municipal de Puerto Real, Puerto Real, Spain, on 6, 7 and 8 September 1985 with the participations of Real Madrid (runners-up of the 1984–85 FIBA European Champions Cup), Simac Milano (champions of the 1984–85 FIBA Korać Cup), Limoges CSP (champions of the 1984–85 Nationale 1) and Winston All Star a selective team from NCAA Division I men's basketball tournament.

== League stage ==
Day 1, September 6, 1985

Team 1	Score	Team 2
Real Madrid (Spain)	120–105	(United States) Winston All Star
Limoges CSP (France)	105–93	(Italy) Simac Milano

Day 2, September 7, 1985

Team 1	Score	Team 2
Real Madrid (Spain)	79–80	(France) Limoges CSP
Winston All Star (United States)	98–83	(Italy) Simac Milano

Day 3, September 8, 1985

Team 1	Score	Team 2
Real Madrid (Spain)	90–100	(Italy) Simac Milano
Winston All Star (United States)	101–97	(France) Limoges CSP

== Final standings ==
	Team	Pld	Pts	W	L	PF	PA	PD
1.	(United States) Winston All Star	3	5	2	1	304	300	+4
2.	(France) Limoges CSP	3	5	2	1	282	273	+9
3.	(Italy) Simac Milano	3	4	1	2	276	293	–17
4.	(Spain) Real Madrid	3	4	1	2	289	285	+4

1985 III ACB International Tournament "II Memorial Héctor Quiroga" Champions

Winston All Star
1st title
