= 1989 Super Cup =

There have been several super cups organized in 1989. These include, and are not limited to:

- 1989 Albanian Supercup, the Albanian soccer match, and first Albanian Supercup for association football
- 1989 Bulgarian Supercup, the Bulgarian soccer match, and first Bulgarian Supercup for association football
- 1989 DFB-Supercup, the West German soccer match, and third DFB Supercup for association football
- 1989 European Super Cup, the UEFA soccer match, and 14th European Super Cup for association football
- 1989 FIBA European Super Cup, the European basketball match, and 2nd European Super Cup for basketball
- 1989 Israel Super Cup, the Israeli soccer match, and 18th Israel Super Cup for association football
- 1989 ADAC Supercup, the West German sports car racing season organized by ADAC and officially called SAT 1 Supercup '89

== See also ==
- Super Bowl XXIII, the 1989 U.S. professional American football match of the NFL
