= 1990 VIII ACB International Tournament "VII Memorial Héctor Quiroga" =

- Sport: Basketball
- Finals champions: (Socialist Federal Republic of Yugoslavia) POP 84
- Runners-up: (Spain) Montigalà Joventut

European Basketball Club Super Cup seasons
- ← 1989 VII ACB International Tournament "VI Memorial Héctor Quiroga" 1991 IX ACB International Tournament "VIII Memorial Héctor Quiroga" →

The 1990 VIII ACB International Tournament "VII Memorial Héctor Quiroga" was the 8th semi-official edition of the European Basketball Club Super Cup. It took place at Pabellón Municipal de Puerto Real, Puerto Real, Spain, on 7, 8 and 9 September 1990 with the participations of POP 84 (champions of the 1989–90 FIBA European Champions Cup), FC Barcelona Banca Catalana (runners-up of the 1989–90 FIBA European Champions Cup and champions of the 1989–90 Liga ACB), Montigalà Joventut (champions of the 1989–90 FIBA Korać Cup) and Maccabi Elite Tel Aviv (champions of the 1989–90 Premier League).

== League stage ==
Day 1, September 7, 1990

Team 1	Score	Team 2
Montigalà Joventut (Spain)	77–81	(Socialist Federal Republic of Yugoslavia) POP 84
FC Barcelona Banca Catalana (Spain)	81–89	(Israel) Maccabi Elite Tel Aviv

Day 2, September 8, 1990

Team 1	Score	Team 2
Montigalà Joventut (Spain)	90–83	(Spain) FC Barcelona Banca Catalana
POP 84 (Socialist Federal Republic of Yugoslavia)	94–81	(Israel) Maccabi Elite Tel Aviv

Day 3, September 9, 1990

Team 1	Score	Team 2
FC Barcelona Banca Catalana (Spain)	77–80	(Socialist Federal Republic of Yugoslavia) POP 84
Montigalà Joventut (Spain)	113–99	(Israel) Maccabi Elite Tel Aviv

== Final standings ==
	Team	Pld	Pts	W	L	PF	PA	PD
1.	(Socialist Federal Republic of Yugoslavia) POP 84	3	6	3	0	255	235	+20
2.	(Spain) Montigalà Joventut	3	5	2	1	280	263	+17
3.	(Israel) Maccabi Elite Tel Aviv	3	4	1	2	269	288	–19
4.	(Spain) FC Barcelona Banca Catalana	3	3	0	3	241	259	–18

1990 VIII ACB International Tournament "VII Memorial Héctor Quiroga" Champions

POP 84
1st title
