= 1987 V ACB International Tournament "IV Memorial Héctor Quiroga" =

- Sport: Basketball
- Finals champions: (Socialist Federal Republic of Yugoslavia) Cibona
- Runners-up: (Spain) FC Barcelona

European Basketball Club Super Cup seasons
- ← 1986 IV ACB International Tournament "III Memorial Héctor Quiroga" 1988 VI ACB International Tournament "V Memorial Héctor Quiroga" →

The 1987 V ACB International Tournament "IV Memorial Héctor Quiroga" was the 5th semi-official edition of the European Basketball Club Super Cup. It took place at Pabellón Municipal de Puerto Real, Puerto Real, Spain, on 29, 30 and 31 August 1987 with the participations of Tracer Milano (champions of the 1986–87 FIBA European Champions Cup), Cibona (champions of the 1986–87 FIBA European Cup Winner's Cup), FC Barcelona (champions of the 1986–87 FIBA Korać Cup) and Ram Joventut (runners-up of the 1986–87 Liga ACB).

== League stage ==
Day 1, August 29, 1987

Team 1	Score	Team 2
FC Barcelona (Spain)	88–96	(Socialist Federal Republic of Yugoslavia) Cibona
Ram Joventut (Spain)	102–89	(Italy) Tracer Milano

Day 2, August 30, 1987

Team 1	Score	Team 2
FC Barcelona (Spain)	82–74	(Spain) Ram Joventut
Cibona (Socialist Federal Republic of Yugoslavia)	95–88	(Italy) Tracer Milano

Day 3, August 31, 1987

Team 1	Score	Team 2
Ram Joventut (Spain)	85–90	(Socialist Federal Republic of Yugoslavia) Cibona
FC Barcelona (Spain)	89–87	(Italy) Tracer Milano

== Final standings ==
	Team	Pld	Pts	W	L	PF	PA	PD
1.	(Socialist Federal Republic of Yugoslavia) Cibona	3	6	3	0	281	261	+20
2.	(Spain) FC Barcelona	3	5	2	1	259	257	+2
3.	(Spain) Ram Joventut	3	4	1	2	261	261	0
4.	(Italy) Tracer Milano	3	3	0	3	264	286	–22

1987 V ACB International Tournament "IV Memorial Héctor Quiroga" Champions

Cibona
1st title
