= FC Barcelona Bàsquet =

Basketball section of the FC Barcelona sports club

FC Barcelona
- 2026–27 FC Barcelona Bàsquet season
- Leagues: Liga ACB; EuroLeague
- Founded: 24 August 1926; 100 years ago
- History: FC Barcelona (1926–present)
- Arena: Palau Blaugrana
- Capacity: 7,585
- Location: Barcelona, Spain
- Team colors: Blue, cardinal, yellow
- President: Joan Laporta
- Team manager: Juan Carlos Navarro
- Head coach: Aleksander Sekulić
- Team captain: Kevin Punter
- Ownership: FC Barcelona
- International titles: 2 EuroLeagues; 1 Intercontinental Cup; 2 Korać Cups; 2 Saporta Cup
- Domestic titles: 20 Spanish Championships; 27 Spanish Cups; 6 Spanish Supercups
- Retired numbers: 5 (4, 7, 11, 12, 15)
- Website: fcbarcelona.com
Home	Away	Third

FC Barcelona Bàsquet (English: FC Barcelona Basketball), commonly referred to as FC Barcelona (Catalan pronunciation: [fubˈbɔl ˈklub bəɾsəˈlonə]) and colloquially known as Barça ([ˈbaɾsə]), is a professional basketball team based in Barcelona, Catalonia, Spain. It is a part of the FC Barcelona multi-sports club, and was founded on 24 August 1926, which makes it the oldest club in the Liga ACB. The team, which competes in the Liga ACB and the EuroLeague, is one of the most successful basketball teams domestically as well as internationally. Two times European champions, Barça completed a triple crown in 2003 by winning the season's league, cup and EuroLeague. Their home arena is the Palau Blaugrana, which was opened on 23 October 1971. They share the facilities with the roller hockey, futsal and handball teams of the club.

Some of the well-known players that have played with the team included Pau Gasol, Rony Seikaly, Marc Gasol, Anderson Varejão, Juan Carlos Navarro, Jaka Lakovič, Šarūnas Jasikevičius, Dejan Bodiroga, Gianluca Basile, Ricky Rubio, Juan Antonio San Epifanio, Saša Đorđević, and Tony Massenburg.

FC Barcelona also has a reserve team, called FC Barcelona Bàsquet B, that plays in the Liga U.

== History ==
=== Early years ===
Founded on 24 August 1926, the club entered its first competition in 1927, playing in the Campionat de Catalunya de Basquetbol (Catalan Basketball Championship). During these early years, basketball in Catalonia was dominated by clubs such as CE Europa, Laietà BC and Société Patrie (later CB Atlètic Gràcia) and it was not until the 1940s that FC Barcelona created a basketball team. During this decade they won six Copas del Generalísimo de Baloncesto and were runners-up once. In 1956 they were founding members of the Liga Española de Baloncesto and finished as runners-up. In 1959 they won Spanish basketball's first-ever league and cup double.

=== Decline in the 1960s ===
The 1960s and 1970s saw the team in decline. In 1961 the club president Enric Llaudet dissolved the team in spite of its popularity. However, in 1962, the club was reformed after a campaign by the fans. In 1964 the league's Primera División was cut from fourteen teams to eight and the club found themselves in the Segunda División after not finishing between the two first qualified teams in the relegation playoffs. However they quickly returned to the top division after being crowned Segunda champions in 1965. During the 1970s the club was persistently overshadowed by its rivals Real Madrid and Joventut.

=== Revival in the 1980s ===
In the 1980s club president Josep Lluís Núñez gave the team his full support with the aim of making the club the best in Spain and Europe. His support produced results and during the decade inspired by their coach Aíto García Reneses and players like Juan Antonio San Epifanio (better known as Epi), Andrés Jiménez, Sibilio, Audie Norris and Solozábal, the club won six Spanish championships, five Spanish cups, two European Cup Winners' Cups, the Korać Cup and the World Championship. However the European Cup remained elusive, ending as runners-up in 1984. In the 1987–88 season Barça won the Copa Príncipe, Liga ACB, Copa del Rey and the Supercopa completing a quadruple.

=== Champions of Europe ===
The club built on this success during the 1990s, winning a further four Spanish championships and two Spanish cups. They were still unable to win the European Cup despite playing in a further four finals in 1990, 1991, 1996 and 1997. They also made a record six EuroLeague Final Four appearances. The star player during this era was Juan Antonio San Epifanio.

Their persistence eventually paid off and in 2003, inspired by Dejan Bodiroga, Gregor Fučka, Šarūnas Jasikevičius and Juan Carlos Navarro, they won the EuroLeague, beating Benetton Treviso 76–65 in front of a packed Palau Sant Jordi in Barcelona. They repeated the feat in 2010, defeating Olympiacos by a wide 86–68 in Paris, and that October, they made further history when they beat the two-time defending NBA champion Los Angeles Lakers – including Kobe Bryant and FCB Bàsquet alumnus and Barcelona native Pau Gasol – 92–88 at the Palau Sant Jordi as part of the 2010 NBA Europe Live Tour. The match was also notable for being both a match-up between the reigning NBA and EuroLeague champions and the first time a European team had won against a defending NBA champion. Two FCB Bàsquet players in that game – captain Navarro and point guard Ricky Rubio – either had or went on to play in the NBA.

=== Recent years ===
In the following years, Barcelona would stay on top of Spanish basketball, playing almost all league and cup finals against rival Real Madrid. From 2012 until 2014, Barcelona managed to reach the Euroleague Final Four. However, it could not reach further than the semifinals. Barcelona won the Spanish Championship in 2014, but the next few seasons became absolute disasters, both in the Euroleague, and the Spanish League. However, the team saw a return to form in the Copa del Rey, which was won in 2018, in 2019 and in 2021 defeating Real Madrid on all three finals. In 2021 the Spanish Championship was won for the 19th time—the first in seven years—and only a narrow defeat against Anadolu Efes in the championship game of the 2021 EuroLeague Final Four prevented the Catalan giants from winning the competition for the third time. On June 21, 2023, Barça defeated Real Madrid 82–93 to win their 20th Spanish Championship.

== Sponsorship naming ==
Banca Catalana was the team's initial sponsor, being featured in the official name and the team's uniform for 10 seasons, between 1989 and 1998. From 2004 until 2007 the club was sponsored by the Winterthur Group, a Swiss insurance company with offices in Barcelona since 1910. Coincidentally, Winterthur was the birthplace of club founder Joan Gamper. In 2006 the Winterthur Group was taken over by AXA, leading to a change in the club name. In the 2008–09 season, the club's sponsorship changed to Spanish insurer Regal (a division of Liberty Seguros, the Spanish subsidiary of American insurer Liberty Mutual). This sponsorship finished in June 2013. The team's most recent name sponsor was Turkish tyre manufacturer Lassa Tyres, between 2015 and 2019.

- FC Barcelona Banca Catalana (1989–1998)
- Winterthur FC Barcelona (2004–2007)
- AXA FC Barcelona (2007–2008)
- Regal FC Barcelona (2008–2011)
- FC Barcelona Regal (2011–2013)
- FC Barcelona Lassa (2015–2019)

== Home arenas ==
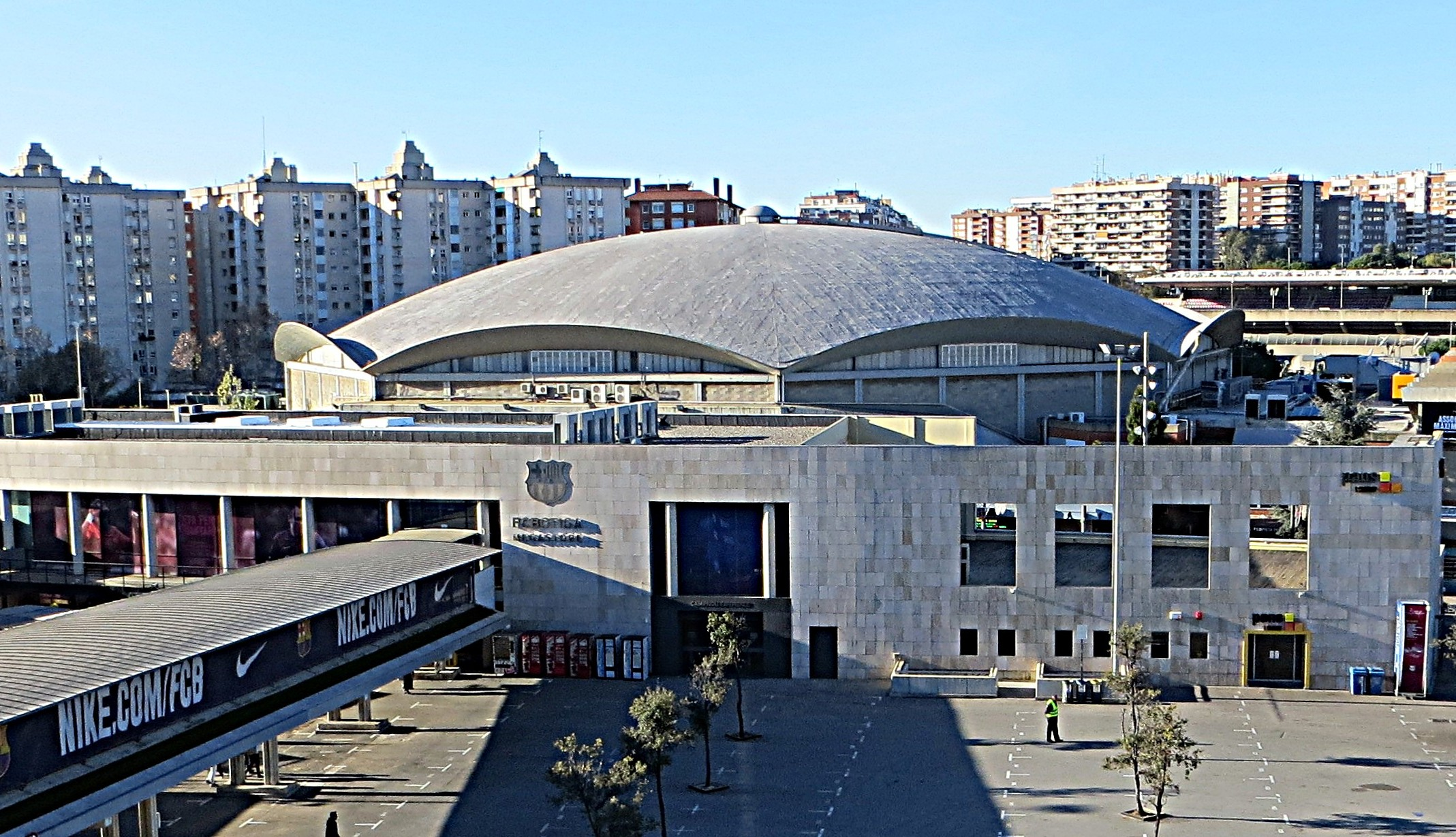
Palau Blaugrana

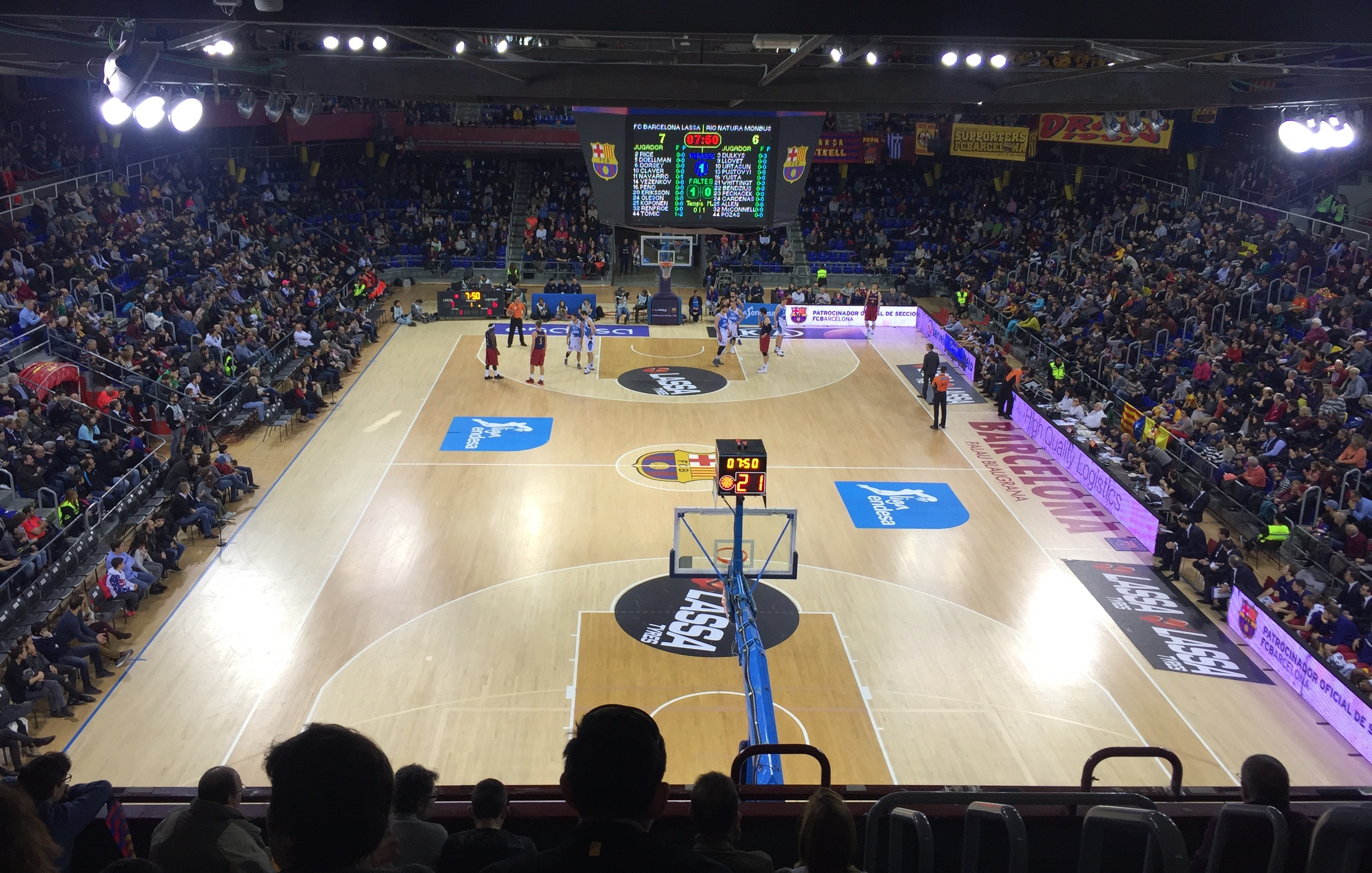
A Barcelona home game inside the Palau Blaugrana.

- Sol de Baix Sports Complex (1926–1940)
- Les Corts Court (1940–1971), located next to Les Corts football stadium
- Palau Sant Jordi (1990–1992), after 1992 occasionally used for home games
- Palau Blaugrana (1971–1990, 1992–present)
- Nou Palau Blaugrana (future venue)

== Players ==
=== Retired numbers ===
FC Barcelona retired numbers
No	Nat.	Player	Pos.	Tenure
4	(Spanish Basketball Federation)	Andrés Jiménez	PF	1986–1998
7	(Spanish Basketball Federation)	Nacho Solozábal	PG	1978–1994
11	(Spanish Basketball Federation)	Juan Carlos Navarro	SG	1997–2007, 2008–2018
12	(Spanish Basketball Federation)	Roberto Dueñas	C	1996–2005
15	(Spanish Basketball Federation)	Juan Antonio San Epifanio	SF	1979–1995

=== Current roster ===
Note: Flags indicate national team eligibility at FIBA-sanctioned events. Players may hold other non-FIBA nationalities not displayed.

FC Barcelona roster
Players
Coaches

Pos.	No.	Nat.	Name	Ht.	Wt.	Age
SG	0	(United States) (Serbia)	Punter, Kevin (C)	1.93 m (6 ft 4 in)	81 kg (179 lb)	33 – 25 June 1993
PG	1	(Bulgaria)	Gibson, Umoja	1.83 m (6 ft 0 in)	77 kg (170 lb)	28 – 4 July 1998
G/F	2	(United States)	Martin, Tyrese	1.98 m (6 ft 6 in)	98 kg (216 lb)	27 – 7 March 1999
G/F	3	(United States) (Nigeria)	Umude, Stanley	1.98 m (6 ft 6 in)	95 kg (209 lb)	27 – 12 April 1999
PG	5	(United States)	Robinson, Justin	1.85 m (6 ft 1 in)	84 kg (185 lb)	28 – 12 October 1997
SG	8	(Spain)	Brizuela, Darío	1.88 m (6 ft 2 in)	78 kg (172 lb)	31 – 8 November 1994
G/F	10	(Uruguay)	Ubal, Agustín	2.03 m (6 ft 8 in)	88 kg (194 lb)	23 – 19 July 2003
PF	13	(Finland)	Nkamhoua, Olivier	2.03 m (6 ft 8 in)	101 kg (223 lb)	26 – 2 May 2000
PG	17	(Spain)	Núñez, Juan	1.94 m (6 ft 4 in)	86 kg (190 lb)	22 – 4 June 2004
F	20	(United Kingdom)	Evbuomwan, Tosan (injured)	2.05 m (6 ft 9 in)	98 kg (216 lb)	25 – 16 February 2001
C	22	(Poland)	Balcerowski, Olek	2.16 m (7 ft 1 in)	123 kg (271 lb)	25 – 19 November 2000
F	24	(Dominican Republic)	Minaya, Justin	1.96 m (6 ft 5 in)	93 kg (205 lb)	27 – 26 March 1999
C	32	(Slovenia)	Nebo, Josh (injured)	2.06 m (6 ft 9 in)	111 kg (245 lb)	29 – 17 July 1997
F	44	(Spain)	Parra, Joel	2.02 m (6 ft 8 in)	88 kg (194 lb)	26 – 4 April 2000
F/C	55	(France)	Makoundou, Yoan (injured)	2.07 m (6 ft 9 in)	102 kg (225 lb)	26 – 9 August 2000

Head coach

- (Basketball Federation of Slovenia) Aleksander Sekulić

Assistant coach(es)

- (Croatian Basketball Federation) Jurica Žuža
- (Basketball Federation of Slovenia) Jernej Valentinčič
- (Spanish Basketball Federation) Marc Estany

Team manager

- (Spanish Basketball Federation) Xevi Pujol

Legend

- (C) Team captain
- (Y) Youth player
- Injured

- Roster
- Transactions

=== Depth chart ===
Pos.	Starting 5	Bench 1	Bench 2	Inactive
C	Olek Balcerowski †	Olivier Nkamhoua		Josh Nebo (injured)
PF	Joel Parra †	Justin Minaya		Yoan Makoundou (injured)
SF	Stanley Umude	Agustín Ubal †		Tosan Evbuomwan (injured)
SG	Kevin Punter	Darío Brizuela †	Tyrese Martin *
PG	Justin Robinson *	Umoja Gibson	Juan Núñez †

Notes: Blue † – homegrown player; (Note: A homegrown player is a player that played for at least three years before the age of 20 on a Spanish team. In Liga ACB, the team must register at least four homegrown players in rosters of 10–12 players or at least three homegrown players in rosters of 8–9 players. In EuroLeague, the team did not have any limitations regarding the number of homegrown players.) Red * – overseas player; (Note: An overseas player is a player from outside EEA, FIBA Europe or ACP states. In Liga ACB, the team may register at most two overseas players. In EuroLeague, the team did not have any limitations regarding the number of overseas players.) Green ‡ – youth player (Note: In Liga ACB, the team may register under-22 players linked to the youth system. In EuroLeague, the team may register under-20 players linked to the youth system.)

== Notable players ==
Note: Flags indicate national team eligibility at FIBA-sanctioned events. Players may hold other non-FIBA nationalities not displayed.

Criteria

To appear in this section a player must have either:

- Set a club record or won an individual award while at the club
- Played at least one official international match for their national team at any time
- Played at least one official NBA match at any time.

- (Spain) Álex Abrines
- (Spain) Quique Andreu
- (Spain) Manel Bosch
- (Spain) Nino Buscató
- (Spain) Víctor Claver
- (Spain) Joan Creus
- (Spain) Juan de la Cruz
- (Spain) Rodrigo de la Fuente
- (Spain) Salva Díez
- (Spain) Roberto Dueñas
- (Spain) Aíto García Reneses
- (Spain) Marc Gasol
- (Spain) Pau Gasol
- (Spain) Roger Grimau
- (Spain) Andrés Jiménez
- (Spain) Rafael Jofresa
- (Spain) Ferran Martínez
- (Spain) José Antonio Montero
- (Spain) Juan Carlos Navarro
- (Spain) Pierre Oriola
- (Spain) Xavi Rabaseda
- (Spain) Pau Ribas
- (Spain) Ignacio Rodríguez
- (Spain) Ricky Rubio
- (Spain) Víctor Sada
- (Spain) Juan Antonio San Epifanio
- (Spain) Luis Miguel Santillana
- (Spain) / (Dominican Republic) Chicho Sibilio
- (Spain) Nacho Solozábal
- (Spain) Jordi Trias
- (Spain) Fran Vázquez
- (Argentina) Nicolás Laprovíttola
- (Argentina) Marcelo Nicola
- (Argentina) Pepe Sánchez
- (Australia) David Andersen
- (Australia) Danté Exum
- (Australia) Joe Ingles
- (Australia) Nathan Jawai
- (Brazil) Marcelinho Huertas
- (Brazil) Anderson Varejão
- (Bulgaria) Sasha Vezenkov
- (Canada) Lars Hansen
- (Canada) Greg Wiltjer
- (Central African Republic) Romain Sato
- (Croatia) Mario Hezonja
- (Croatia) Mario Kasun
- (Croatia) Ante Tomić
- (Croatia) Roko Ukić
- (Croatia) Andrija Žižić
- (Czech Republic) Luboš Bartoň
- (Czech Republic) Tomáš Satoranský
- (Czech Republic) Jan Veselý
- (Denmark) Christian Drejer
- (Finland) Petteri Koponen
- (France) Alain Digbeu
- (Germany) Patrick Femerling
- (Germany) Ademola Okulaja
- (Germany) Tibor Pleiß
- (Greece) Ioannis Bourousis
- (Greece) Nikos Oikonomou
- (Greece) Michalis Kakiouzis
- (Greece) Kostas Papanikolaou
- (Greece) Stratos Perperoglou
- (Greece) Efthimios Rentzias
- (Italy) Gianluca Basile
- (Italy) Gregor Fučka
- (Italy) Denis Marconato
- (Jamaica) Samardo Samuels
- (Kosovo) Justin Doellman
- (Lithuania) Šarūnas Jasikevičius
- (Lithuania) Artūras Karnišovas
- (Lithuania) Rokas Jokubaitis
- (North Macedonia) Vlado Ilievski
- (Netherlands) Francisco Elson
- (Netherlands) Remon van de Hare
- (Nigeria) / (United States) Chimezie Metu
- (Poland) Maciej Lampe
- (Puerto Rico) Carlos Arroyo
- (Puerto Rico) Héctor Blondet
- (Puerto Rico) Piculín Ortiz
- (Puerto Rico) Ramón Rivas
- (Puerto Rico) Daniel Santiago
- (Senegal) Boniface N'Dong
- (Russia) Andrei Fetisov
- (Slovenia) Jaka Lakovič
- (Slovenia) Erazem Lorbek
- (Slovenia) Boštjan Nachbar
- (Serbia) Dejan Bodiroga
- (Serbia) Saša Đorđević
- (Serbia) Milan Gurović
- (Serbia) Nikola Kalinić
- (Serbia) Kosta Perović
- (Serbia) Zoran Savić
- (Serbia) Miloš Vujanić
- (Montenegro) / (Spain) Nikola Mirotić
- (Turkey) Ersan İlyasova
- (Turkey) Sertaç Şanlı
- (United States) Derrick Alston
- (United States) Alan Anderson
- (United States) Justin Anderson
- (United States) Wallace Bryant
- (United States) Ben Coleman
- (United States) Corey Crowder
- (United States) / (Uganda) Brandon Davies
- (United States) Mike Davis
- (United States) Joey Dorsey
- (United States) Dan Godfread
- (United States) Bob Guyette
- (United States) Nigel Hayes-Davis
- (United States) Cory Higgins
- (United States) Otis Howard
- (United States) Mike Fritzthadus Jones
- (United States) / (Slovakia) Kyle Kuric
- (United States) Tony Massenburg
- (United States) Amal McCaskill
- (United States) Eugene McDowell
- (United States) Darryl Middleton
- (United States) Pete Mickeal
- (United States) Xavier Munford
- (United States) Jerrod Mustaf
- (United States) Terence Morris
- (United States) Audie Norris
- (United States) / (Spain) Brad Oleson
- (United States) Jabari Parker
- (United States) / (Georgia (country)) Jacob Pullen
- (United States) / (Montenegro) Tyrese Rice
- (United States) Fred Roberts
- (United States) Jeff Ruland
- (Lebanon) / (United States) Rony Seikaly
- (United States) Steve Trumbo
- (United States) Granville Waiters
- (United States) Shammond Williams
- (United States) David Wood

=== Players at the NBA draft ===
*	Denotes player who has been selected for at least one All-Star Game and All-NBA Team
^{#}	Denotes player who has never appeared in an NBA regular-season or playoff game
^{~}	Denotes player who has been selected as Rookie of the Year

Position	Player	Year	Round	Pick	Drafted by
C	(Spain) Roberto Dueñas^{#}	1997	2nd round	57th	Chicago Bulls
PF/C	(Spain) Pau Gasol^{*~}	2001	1st round	3rd	Atlanta Hawks
SG	(Spain) Juan Carlos Navarro	2002	2nd round	40th	Washington Wizards
C	(Netherlands) Remon van de Hare^{#}	2003	2nd round	52nd	Toronto Raptors
PF/C	(Brazil) Anderson Varejão	2004	2nd round	30th	Orlando Magic
SF	(Denmark) Christian Drejer^{#}	2004	2nd round	51st	New Jersey Nets
SG/SF	(Spain) Álex Abrines	2013	2nd round	32nd	Oklahoma City Thunder
PF/C	(Montenegro) Marko Todorović^{#}	2013	2nd round	45th	Portland Trail Blazers
SF/PF	(Croatia) Mario Hezonja	2015	1st round	5th	Orlando Magic
SG/SF	(Sweden) Marcus Eriksson^{#}	2015	2nd round	50th	Atlanta Hawks
SF/PF	(Bulgaria) Sasha Vezenkov	2017	2nd round	57th	Brooklyn Nets
SF	(Latvia) Rodions Kurucs	2018	2nd round	40th	Brooklyn Nets
SF	(Argentina) Leandro Bolmaro	2020	1st round	23rd	New York Knicks
C	(Nigeria) James Nnaji^{#}	2023	2nd round	31rd	Detroit Pistons

== Head coaches ==
- (Spain) José Vila 1926–1936
- (Spain) Juan Enrique Henry 1941–1945
- (Spain) Fernando Font 1945–1955, 1967
- (Spain) Joaquim Broto 1955–1956
- (Spain) Francisco Ortiz 1956–1958
- (Spain) Guimerà 1960
- (Spain) Joan Canals 1960–1963
- (Spain) Josep Grau 1963–1964
- (Spain) Josep Bargalló 1965
- (Spain) Eduardo Portela 1965–1967
- (Spain) Santiago Navarro 1967–1968
- (Spain) Xabier Añúa 1968–1972
- (United States) Willy Ernst 1972–1973
- (Spain) Vicente Sanjuán 1973–1974
- (Serbia) Ranko Žeravica 1974–1976
- (Serbia) Todor Lazić 1976–1977
- (Spain) Eduardo Kucharski 1977–1979
- (Spain) Antoni Serra 1979–1985
- (Spain) Manolo Flores 1985, 2005
- (Spain) Aíto García Reneses 1985–1990, 1992–1997, 1998–2002
- (Serbia) Božidar Maljković 1990–1992
- (Spain) Manel Comas 1997
- (Spain) José María Oleart 1997
- (Spain) Joan Montes 1997–1998, 2004–2005
- (Serbia) Svetislav Pešić 2002–2004, 2018–2020
- (Montenegro) Duško Ivanović 2005–2008
- (Spain) Xavi Pascual 2008–2016, 2025–2026
- (Greece) Georgios Bartzokas 2016–2017
- (Spain) Sito Alonso 2017–2018
- (Lithuania) Šarūnas Jasikevičius 2020–2023
- (Spain) Roger Grimau 2023–2024
- (Spain) Joan Peñarroya 2024–2025
- (Slovenia) Aleksander Sekulić 2026–present

== Honours and other achievements ==
Honours
Type	Competition	Titles	Seasons
Domestic	Spanish League	20	1958–59, 1980–81, 1982–83, 1986–87, 1987–88, 1988–89, 1989–90, 1994–95, 1995–96, 1996–97, 1998–99, 2000–01, 2002–03, 2003–04, 2008–09, 2010–11, 2011–12, 2013–14, 2020–21, 2022–23
Domestic	Spanish Cup	27	1943, 1945, 1946, 1947, 1949, 1950, 1959, 1978, 1979, 1980, 1981, 1982, 1983, 1987, 1988, 1991, 1994, 2001, 2003, 2007, 2010, 2011, 2013, 2018, 2019, 2021, 2022
Domestic	Spanish Supercup	6	1987–88, 2004, 2009, 2010, 2011, 2015
European	EuroLeague	2	2002–03, 2009–10
European	FIBA Saporta Cup	2	1984–85, 1985–86
European	FIBA Korać Cup	2	1986–87, 1998–99
Worldwide	FIBA Club World Cup	1	1985

=== Other Achievements ===
==== Trebles ====
- Triple Crown
  - Season (1): 2002–03
- Small Triple Crown
  - Season (1): 1986–87

==== International Competitions ====
- EuroLeague
  - Runners-up (6): 1983–84, 1989–90, 1990–91, 1995–96, 1996–97, 2020–21
  - 3rd place (4): 2008–09, 2011–12, 2013–14, 2021–22
  - 4th place (7): 1981–82, 1988–89, 1993–94, 1999–00, 2005–06, 2012–13, 2022–23
  - Final Four (17): 1989, 1990, 1991, 1994, 1996, 1997, 2000, 2003, 2006, 2009, 2010, 2012, 2013, 2014, 2021, 2022, 2023
- FIBA Saporta Cup
  - Runners-up (1): 1980–81
  - Semifinalists (3): 1977–78, 1978–79, 1979–80
- FIBA Korać Cup
  - Runners-up (1): 1974–75
  - Semifinalists (2): 1973, 1992–93
- European Basketball Club Super Cup (semi-official, defunct): 3
  - 1983, 1986, 1986
  - Runners-up (1): 1987
  - 3rd place (1): 1991
  - 4th place (3): 1988, 1989, 1990

==== Domestic Competitions ====
- Spanish League
  - Runners-up (24): 1957, 1971–72, 1973–74, 1974–75, 1975–76, 1976–77, 1978–79, 1979–80, 1981–82, 1983–84, 1985–86, 1990–91, 1993–94, 1999–00, 2006–07, 2007–08, 2009–10, 2012–13, 2014–15, 2015–16, 2018–19, 2019–20, 2021–22, 2025–26
- Spanish Cup
  - Runners-up (12): 1942, 1951, 1961, 1977, 1984, 1989, 1996, 2002, 2012, 2014, 2015, 2024
- Spanish Supercup
  - Runners-up (9): 2012, 2013, 2014, 2016, 2019, 2020, 2021, 2022, 2026
- Prince Asturias Cup: 1
  - 1988
  - Runners-up (1): 1989

==== Worldwide competitions ====
- FIBA Intercontinental Cup
  - Runners-up (1): 1987
  - 4th place (1): 1984
- McDonald's Championship
  - 3rd place (1): 1990
  - 4th place (1): 1989

==== Regional competitions ====
- Catalan Championship (defunct): 9
  - 1942, 1943, 1945, 1946, 1947, 1948, 1950, 1951, 1955
  - Runners-up (3): 1928, 1949, 1953
- Catalan League: 25
  - 1980, 1981, 1982, 1983, 1984, 1985, 1989, 1993, 1995, 2000, 2001, 2004, 2009, 2010, 2011, 2012, 2013, 2014, 2015, 2016, 2017, 2019, 2022, 2023, 2024
  - Runners-up (15): 1986, 1987, 1988, 1990, 1991, 1992, 1994, 2002, 2003, 2005, 2006, 2008, 2018, 2020, 2021

==== Other Competitions ====
- Pohlheim, Germany Invitational Game:
  - 2008
- Calonge, Spain Invitational Game:
  - 2008
- Bologna, Italy Invitational Game:
  - 2008
- Sant Julia de Vilatorta, Spain Invitational Game:
  - 2009, 2012, 2014

Runners-Up (2): 2018, 2019

- Sabadell, Spain Invitational Game:
  - 2011
- Palamós, Spain Invitational Game:
  - 2011
- Tarragona, Spain Invitational Game:
  - 2011
- Cordoba, Spain Invitational Game:
  - 2014
- Trofeo MoraBanc:
  - 2015
- Torneo de Fuenlabrada
  - 2015
- Trofeo Circuito de Pretemporada Movistar:
  - 2016
- Monzon, Spain Invitational Game:
  - 2017
- Platja D'Aro, Spain Invitational Game:
  - 2017
- Trofeo Memorial Quino Salvo:
  - 2017
- Torneig d'invitacions de Les Borges Blanques:
  - 2018
- Torneo Xacobeo:
  - 2019
- Badalona, Spain Invitational Game:
  - 2020

== Individual awards ==
ACB Most Valuable Player

- Nikola Mirotic – 2020
- Juan Carlos Navarro – 2006

ACB Finals MVP

- Xavi Fernández – 1996
- Roberto Dueñas – 1997
- Derrick Alston – 1999
- Pau Gasol – 2001
- Šarūnas Jasikevičius – 2003
- Dejan Bodiroga – 2004
- Juan Carlos Navarro – 2009, 2011, 2014
- Erazem Lorbek – 2012
- Nikola Mirotić – 2021
- Nikola Mirotić – 2023

Spanish Cup MVP

- Pau Gasol – 2001
- Dejan Bodiroga – 2003
- Jordi Trias – 2007
- Fran Vázquez – 2010
- Alan Anderson – 2011
- Pete Mickeal – 2013
- Thomas Heurtel – 2018, 2019
- Cory Higgins – 2021
- Nikola Mirotić – 2022

Supercup MVP

- Dejan Bodiroga – 2004
- Juan Carlos Navarro – 2009, 2010, 2011
- Pau Ribas – 2015

ACB Slam Dunk Champion

- Francisco Elson – 2001

EuroLeague MVP

- Juan Carlos Navarro – 2009
- Nikola Mirotić – 2022

EuroLeague Final Four MVP

- Dejan Bodiroga – 2003
- Juan Carlos Navarro – 2010

EuroLeague Rising Star

- Ricky Rubio – 2010
- Álex Abrines – 2016
- Rokas Jokubaitis – 2022

All-EuroLeague First Team

- Dejan Bodiroga – 2003, 2004
- Juan Carlos Navarro – 2006, 2007, 2009, 2010, 2011
- Erazem Lorbek – 2011
- Ante Tomić – 2013, 2014
- Nikola Mirotić – 2021, 2022

All-EuroLeague Second Team

- Pau Gasol – 2001
- Erazem Lorbek – 2010
- Juan Carlos Navarro – 2012, 2013
- Ante Tomić – 2015
- Brandon Davies – 2021
- Nikola Mirotić – 2023

All-ACB First Team

- Dejan Bodiroga – 2004
- Juan Carlos Navarro – 2006, 2007, 2009, 2010
- Fran Vázquez – 2009
- Erazem Lorbek – 2010, 2012
- Ricky Rubio – 2010
- Ante Tomić – 2013
- Nikola Mirotić – 2020
- Nicolás Laprovíttola – 2022

All-ACB Second Team

- Tomáš Satoranský – 2016
- Ante Tomić – 2017, 2018
- Thomas Heurtel – 2018, 2019
- Ádám Hanga – 2020
- Cory Higgins – 2021
- Nikola Mirotić – 2021, 2022, 2023
- Nicolás Laprovíttola – 2023

=== Records ===
- Most points scored in a game: FC Barcelona 147–106 Cajabilbao (1986–87)
- Biggest point differential: 74 – FC Barcelona 128–54 Mataró (1972–73)
- Biggest point differential (against): 60 – Real Madrid 125–65 FC Barcelona (1973) and Real Madrid 138–78 FC Barcelona (1977)
- Most games played with FC Barcelona: Juan Antonio San Epifanio (421)
- Most minutes played with FC Barcelona: Juan Antonio San Epifanio (11,758)
- Most career points scored with FC Barcelona: Juan Antonio San Epifanio (7,028)
- Most assists: Juan Carlos Navarro (932)*
- Most rebounds: Roberto Dueñas (2.113)
- Most blocked shots: Roberto Dueñas (266)
- Most three-point shots made: Juan Carlos Navarro (684)*
- Most steals: Nacho Solozábal (611)

Note: Players with a * are still playing for Barcelona.

== Season by season ==
Season	Tier	Division	Pos.	W–L	Copa del Rey	Other cups		European competitions		
1923–56	Copa del Rey		6 times champion (42–43, 44–45, 45–46, 46–47, 48–49, 49–50), 2 times runner-up (41–42, 50–51)							
1957	1	1ª División	2nd	7–3	Fourth position					
1958	1	1ª División	8th	4–14						
1958–59	1	1ª División	1st	20–2	Champion					
1959–60	1	1ª División	6th	11–11	Semifinalist			1 Champions Cup	QF	2–2
1960–61	1	1ª División	3rd	15–7	Runner-up					
1961–62	The club temporarily dissolved the section and played in regional leagues									
1962–63	1	1ª División	6th	2–10						
1963–64	1	1ª División	6th	4–8						
1964–65	2	2ª División	1st							
1965–66	1	1ª División	5th	8–10	Semifinalist					
1966–67	1	1ª División	7th	9–11	Quarterfinalist					
1967–68	1	1ª División	8th	6–14	Quarterfinalist					
1968–69	1	1ª División	7th	8–1–13	Quarterfinalist					
1969–70	1	1ª División	6th	11–11	Quarterfinalist					
1970–71	1	1ª División	6th	11–11	Quarterfinalist					
1971–72	1	1ª División	2nd	19–3	Semifinalist					
1972–73	1	1ª División	3rd	22–2–6	Quarterfinalist			3 Korać Cup	SF	3–2
1973–74	1	1ª División	2nd	22–2–4	Quarterfinalist			3 Korać Cup	R12	7–1
1974–75	1	1ª División	2nd	19–3	Semifinalist			3 Korać Cup	RU	9–5
1975–76	1	1ª División	2nd	23–9	Semifinalist			3 Korać Cup	R16	3–3
1976–77	1	1ª División	2nd	20–1–1	Runner-up					
1977–78	1	1ª División	3rd	19–3	Champion			2 Cup Winners' Cup	SF	7–1–4
1978–79	1	1ª División	2nd	17–5	Champion			2 Cup Winners' Cup	SF	8–2
1979–80	1	1ª División	2nd	19–3	Champion			2 Cup Winners' Cup	SF	4–4
1980–81	1	1ª División	1st	23–3	Champion			2 Cup Winners' Cup	RU	6–3
1981–82	1	1ª División	2nd	24–2	Champion			1 Champions Cup	SF	10–6
1982–83	1	1ª División	1st	26–1	Champion			2 Cup Winners' Cup	QF	3–3
1983–84	1	Liga ACB	2nd	29–7	Runner-up			1 Champions Cup	RU	11–4
1984–85	1	Liga ACB	3rd	26–7	Third position	Intercontinental Cup	4th	2 Cup Winners' Cup	C	9–2
1985–86	1	Liga ACB	2nd	27–8	Third position	Intercontinental Cup	C	2 Cup Winners' Cup	C	7–2
1986–87	1	Liga ACB	1st	31–7	Champion	Copa Príncipe	QF	3 Korać Cup	C	7–3
1987–88	1	Liga ACB	1st	31–9	Champion	Club World Cup	RU	1 Champions Cup	QF	13–5
1987–88	1	Liga ACB	1st	31–9	Champion	Supercopa	C	1 Champions Cup	QF	13–5
1987–88	1	Liga ACB	1st	31–9	Champion	Copa Príncipe	C	1 Champions Cup	QF	13–5
1988–89	1	Liga ACB	1st	35–9	Runner-up	Copa Príncipe	RU	1 Champions Cup	4th	13–5
1989–90	1	Liga ACB	1st	38–8	Quarterfinalist			1 Champions Cup	RU	15–3
1990–91	1	Liga ACB	2nd	34–13	Champion	Copa Príncipe	SF	1 Champions Cup	RU	14–4
1991–92	1	Liga ACB	6th	26–12	Fourth position			1 European League	QF	12–6
1992–93	1	Liga ACB	3rd	29–11	Quarterfinalist			3 Korać Cup	SF	11–3
1993–94	1	Liga ACB	2nd	28–12	Champion			1 European League	4th	12–9
1994–95	1	Liga ACB	1st	38–12	Quarterfinalist			1 European League	GS	10–6
1995–96	1	Liga ACB	1st	38–11	Runner-up			1 European League	RU	13–5
1996–97	1	Liga ACB	1st	36–12	Semifinalist			1 EuroLeague	RU	13–10
1997–98	1	Liga ACB	4th	24–17	Quarterfinalist			1 EuroLeague	R16	10–9
1998–99	1	Liga ACB	1st	35–8	Semifinalist			3 Korać Cup	C	13–3
1999–00	1	Liga ACB	2nd	34–14	Quarterfinalist			1 EuroLeague	4th	16–8
2000–01	1	Liga ACB	1st	38–5	Champion			1 Euroleague	T16	8–4
2001–02	1	Liga ACB	3rd	31–11	Runner-up			1 Euroleague	T16	14–6
2002–03	1	Liga ACB	1st	36–9	Champion			1 Euroleague	C	18–4
2003–04	1	Liga ACB	1st	32–14	Quarterfinalist			1 Euroleague	T16	14–6
2004–05	1	Liga ACB	5th	25–13	Quarterfinalist	Supercopa	C	1 Euroleague	T16	11–9
2005–06	1	Liga ACB	3rd	27–14	Quarterfinalist			1 Euroleague	4th	15–10
2006–07	1	Liga ACB	2nd	30–17	Champion	Supercopa	SF	1 Euroleague	QF	14–9
2007–08	1	Liga ACB	2nd	28–13	Quarterfinalist	Supercopa	SF	1 Euroleague	QF	13–10
2008–09	1	Liga ACB	1st	33–8	Semifinalist	Supercopa	SF	1 Euroleague	3rd	18–5
2009–10	1	Liga ACB	2nd	36–6	Champion	Supercopa	C	1 Euroleague	C	20–2
2010–11	1	Liga ACB	1st	35–7	Champion	Supercopa	C	1 Euroleague	QF	14–6
2011–12	1	Liga ACB	1st	37–8	Runner-up	Supercopa	C	1 Euroleague	3rd	19–2
2012–13	1	Liga ACB	2nd	30–15	Champion	Supercopa	RU	1 Euroleague	4th	25–6
2013–14	1	Liga ACB	1st	35–10	Runner-up	Supercopa	RU	1 Euroleague	3rd	23–6
2014–15	1	Liga ACB	2nd	30–14	Runner-up	Supercopa	RU	1 Euroleague	QF	21–7
2015–16	1	Liga ACB	2nd	35–9	Quarterfinalist	Supercopa	C	1 Euroleague	QF	17–12
2016–17	1	Liga ACB	6th	23–12	Semifinalist	Supercopa	RU	1 EuroLeague	11th	12–18
2017–18	1	Liga ACB	3rd	27–14	Champion			1 EuroLeague	13th	11–19
2018–19	1	Liga ACB	2nd	33–10	Champion	Supercopa	SF	1 EuroLeague	QF	20–15
2019–20	1	Liga ACB	2nd	24–6	Quarterfinalist	Supercopa	RU	1 EuroLeague	—	22–6
2020–21	1	Liga ACB	1st	38–6	Champion	Supercopa	RU	1 EuroLeague	RU	28–13
2021–22	1	Liga ACB	2nd	33–11	Champion	Supercopa	RU	1 EuroLeague	3rd	25–10
2022–23	1	Liga ACB	1st	37–6	Quarterfinalist	Supercopa	RU	1 EuroLeague	4th	26–13
2023–24	1	Liga ACB	4th	25–14	Runner-up	Supercopa	SF	1 EuroLeague	QF	24–15
2024–25	1	Liga ACB	5th	22–15	Quarterfinalist	Supercopa	SF	1 EuroLeague	QF	22–17
2025–26	1	Liga ACB	2nd	30–14	Semifinalist			1 EuroLeague	P-I	22–18
2026–27	1	Liga ACB				Supercopa	RU	1 EuroLeague		

== International record ==
Season	Achievement	Notes
EuroLeague
1959–60	Quarter-finals	eliminated by Polonia Warsaw, 64-65 (L) in Barcelona and 41-49 (L) in Warsaw
1981–82	Semi-final group stage	4th place in a group with Maccabi Tel Aviv, Squibb Cantù, Partizan, Nashua Den Bosch and Panathinaikos
1983–84	Final	lost to Banco di Roma Virtus, 73–79 in the final (Geneva)
1987–88	Quarter-finals	5th place in a group with Partizan, Aris, Tracer Milano, Maccabi Tel Aviv, Saturn Köln, Orthez and Nashua EBBC
1988–89	Final Four	4th place in Munich, lost to Jugoplastika 77–87 in the semi-final, lost to Aris 71–88 in the 3rd place game
1989–90	Final	defeated Aris 104–83 in the semi-final, lost to Jugoplastika 67–72 in the final (Zaragoza)
1990–91	Final	defeated Maccabi Tel Aviv 101–67 in the semi-final, lost to Pop 84 65–70 in the final (Paris)
1991–92	Quarter-finals	eliminated 2–0 by Philips Milano, 79-80 (L) in Milan and 71-86 (L) in Barcelona
1993–94	Final Four	4th place in Tel Aviv, lost to 7up Joventut 65–79 in the semi-final, lost to Panathinaikos 83–100 in the 3rd place game
1995–96	Final	defeated Real Madrid 76–66 in the semi-final, lost to Panathinaikos 66–67 in the final (Paris)
1996–97	Final	defeated ASVEL 77–70 in the semi-final, lost to Olympiacos 58–73 in the final (Rome)
1999–00	Final Four	4th place in Thessaloniki, lost to Maccabi Tel Aviv 51–65 in the semi-final, lost to Efes Pilsen 69–75 in the 3rd place game
2002–03	Champions	defeated CSKA Moscow 76–71 in the semi-final, defeated Benetton Treviso 76–65 in the final of the Final Four in Barcelona
2005–06	Final Four	4th place in Prague, lost to CSKA Moscow 75–84 in the semi-final, lost to TAU Cerámica 82–87 in the 3rd place game
2006–07	Quarter-finals	eliminated 2–1 by Unicaja, 75-91 (L) in Málaga, 80-58 (W) in Barcelona and 64-67 (L) in Málaga
2007–08	Quarter-finals	eliminated 2–1 by Maccabi Tel Aviv, 75-81 (L) in Tel Aviv, 83-74 (W) in Barcelona and 75-88 (L) in Tel Aviv
2008–09	Final Four	3rd place in Berlin, lost to CSKA Moscow 78–82 in the semi-final, defeated Olympiacos 95–79 in the 3rd place game
2009–10	Champions	defeated CSKA Moscow 64–54 in the semi-final, defeated Olympiacos 86–68 in the final of the Final Four in Paris
2010–11	Quarter-finals	eliminated 3–1 by Panathinaikos, 83-82 (W) & 71-75 (L) in Barcelona, 74-76 (L) & 67-78 (L) in Athens
2011–12	Final Four	3rd place in Istanbul, lost to Olympiacos 64–68 in the semi-final, defeated Panathinaikos 74–69 in the 3rd place game
2012–13	Final Four	4th place in London, lost to Real Madrid 67–74 in the semi-final, lost to CSKA Moscow 73–74 in the 3rd place game
2013–14	Final Four	3rd place in Milan, lost to Real Madrid 62–100 in the semi-final, defeated CSKA Moscow 93–78 in the 3rd place game
2014–15	Quarter-finals	eliminated 3–1 by Olympiacos, 73-57 (W) & 63-76 (L) in Barcelona, 71-73 (L) & 68-71 (L) in Piraeus
2015–16	Quarter-finals	eliminated 3–2 by Lokomotiv-Kuban, 66-61 (L) & 66-92(W) in Krasnodar, 82-70 (W) & 80-92 (L) in Barcelona, 67-81 (L) in Krasnodar
FIBA Saporta Cup
1977–78	Semi-finals	eliminated by Gabetti Cantù, 90-87 (W) in Barcelona and 77-97 (L) in Cantù
1978–79	Semi-finals	eliminated by Gabetti Cantù, 89-84 (W) in Barcelona and 83-101 (L) in Cantù
1979–80	Semi-finals	eliminated by Gabetti Cantù, 92-93 (L) in Barcelona and 74-78 (L) in Cantù
1980–81	Final	lost to Squibb Cantù 82–86 in the final (Rome)
1982–83	Quarter-finals	3rd place in a group with Scavolini Pesaro, Nashua EBBC and Hapoel Ramat Gan
1984–85	Champions	defeated Žalgiris 77–73 in the final of European Cup Winners' Cup in Grenoble
1985–86	Champions	defeated Scavolini Pesaro 101–86 in the final of European Cup Winners' Cup in Caserta
FIBA Korać Cup
1973	Semi-finals	eliminated by Maes Pils, 87-99 (L) in Mechelen and 78-82 (L) in Barcelona
1974–75	Final	lost to Forst Cantù, 69-71 (L) in Barcelona and 85–110 (L) in Cantù
1986–87	Champions	defeated Limoges,106-85 (W) in Barcelona and 97-86 (W) in Limoges in the double finals of Korać Cup
1992–93	Semi-finals	eliminated by Virtus Roma, 64-84 (L) in Barcelona and 79-85 (L) in Rome
1998–99	Champions	defeated Adecco Estudiantes, 77-93 (L) in Madrid and 97-70 (W) in Barcelona in the double finals of Korać Cup
FIBA Intercontinental Cup
1984	4th place	4th place with a 2–2 record in a league tournament in São Paulo
1985	Champions	defeated Monte Líbano 93–89 in the final of Intercontinental Cup in Barcelona
1987	Final	lost to Tracer Milano 84–100 in the final (Milan)
McDonald's Championship
1989	4th place	4th place in Rome, lost to Denver Nuggets 103–137 in the semi-final, lost to Philips Milano 104–136 in the 3rd place game
1990	3rd place	3rd place in Barcelona, lost to Pop 84 97–102 in the semi-final, defeated Scavolini Pesaro 106–105 in the 3rd place game
1997	6th place	6th place in Paris, lost to PSG Racing 84–97 in the preliminary round, lost to Benetton Treviso 103–106 in the 5th place game

== Matches against NBA teams ==
- On 5 October 2006, it became the first European team- second of the FIBA, beyond the Maccabi of Tel Aviv and the National Team of the Soviet Union- to win an NBA rival. It defeated the Philadelphia 76ers in the Palau Sant Jordi of Barcelona.
- On 18 October 2008, it played the first game of an ACB League team on the court of an NBA rival, the Staples Center of Los Angeles against the Los Angeles Lakers.
- On 7 October 2010, FC Barcelona, current champion of the Euroleague, became the first European team and the second FIBA in the History of Basketball to beat the reigning NBA champion, L.A. Lakers, for 92–88, in a match played at the Palau Sant Jordi in Barcelona. Pete Mickeal with 26 points and Juan Carlos Navarro with 25 were the best of the match. In the Lakers, Pau Gasol, former Barça player, was the best with 25 points scored.
- On 9 October 2012 FC Barcelona beat Dallas Mavericks in a match played at the Palau Sant Jordi in Barcelona 99–85 to become the first European team- second of the FIBA, beyond the Maccabi Tel Aviv- to win 3 games against NBA teams.
- On 5 October 2016 it faced the finalist of the Western Conference, the Oklahoma City Thunder. Barcelona lost the match by a narrow margin despite being reduced by the quantity and quality of their injured players. Two basketball players from the subsidiary -Stefan Peno and Pol Figueras- had to occupy the point guard position.

20 October 1989

FC Barcelona (Spain)	103–137	(United States) Denver Nuggets

(Italy) Palaeur, Rome

10 October 2003

FC Barcelona (Spain)	80–91	(United States) Memphis Grizzlies

(Spain) Palau Sant Jordi, Barcelona

5 October 2006

Boxscore

FC Barcelona (Spain)	104–99	(United States) Philadelphia 76ers

(Spain) Palau Sant Jordi, Barcelona

18 October 2008

Boxscore

FC Barcelona (Spain)	104–108	(United States) Los Angeles Lakers

(United States) Staples Center, Los Angeles, California

19 October 2008

Boxscore

FC Barcelona (Spain)	109–114	(United States) Los Angeles Clippers

(United States) Staples Center, Los Angeles, California

7 October 2010

Boxscore

FC Barcelona (Spain)	92–88	(United States) Los Angeles Lakers

(Spain) Palau Sant Jordi, Barcelona

9 October 2012

Boxscore

FC Barcelona (Spain)	99–85	(United States) Dallas Mavericks

(Spain) Palau Sant Jordi, Barcelona

5 October 2016

Boxscore

FC Barcelona (Spain)	89–92	(United States) Oklahoma City Thunder

(Spain) Palau Sant Jordi, Barcelona

== See also ==
- FC Barcelona Bàsquet B
- FC Barcelona–Real Madrid rivalry
- FC Barcelona–Joventut rivalry
