= 1985 Copa del Rey de Baloncesto =

The 1985 Copa del Rey was the 49th edition of the Spanish basketball Cup. It was organized by the ACB and its Final Eight was played in Badalona, in the Pavelló Club Joventut Badalona on 27 and 28 November 1984.

This edition was played by the two first qualified teams of the 1984–85 ACB first stage.

== Qualified teams ==
Group Odd

Team	Pld	W	L	PF	PA	PD	Pts
Real Madrid	14	13	1	1358	1122	+236	27
Ron Negrita Joventut	14	12	2	1337	1163	+174	26

Group Even

Team	Pld	W	L	PF	PA	PD	Pts
FC Barcelona	14	12	2	1355	1205	+150	26
Fórum Valladolid	14	10	4	1194	1167	+27	24

== Bracket ==
Semifinals; 27 November
Real Madrid	94
Fórum Valladolid	77
Ron Negrita Joventut	83
FC Barcelona	79

Final; 28 November
Real Madrid	90
Ron Negrita Joventut	76
Third place game
FC Barcelona	103
Fórum Valladolid	83

== Final ==
28 November 1984
19:00 GTM+1

Boxscore

Real Madrid	90–76	Ron Negrita Joventut
Scoring by half: 47–29, 43–47
Pts: Martín 24; Rebs: Martín 11; Asts: Corbalán 1 PIR: Martín 25		Pts: Villacampa 23; Rebs: Kazanowski 9 Asts: Kazanowski 1 PIR: Villacampa 18

Pavelló Club Joventut Badalona, Badalona
Attendance: 5,000
Referees: Francisco Javier Fajardo, Víctor Mas

1985 Copa del Rey champions

Real Madrid
19th title
