= 1983 I ACB International Tournament =

- Sport: Basketball
- Finals champions: (Spain) FC Barcelona
- Runners-up: (Italy) Banco di Roma

European Basketball Club Super Cup seasons
- 1984 II ACB International Tournament "I Memorial Héctor Quiroga" →

The 1983 I ACB International Tournament was the 1st semi-official edition of the European Basketball Club Super Cup. It took place at Palau dels Esports de Barcelona, Barcelona, Spain, on 2, 3 and 4 September 1983 with the participations of FC Barcelona (champions of the 1982–83 Liga Española de Baloncesto and the 1983 Copa del Rey de Baloncesto), Real Madrid (runners-up of the 1982–83 Liga Española de Baloncesto), Banco di Roma (champions of the 1982–83 FIP Serie A1) and Bosna (champions of the 1982–83 First Federal Basketball League).

== League stage ==
Day 1, September 2, 1983

| Team 1 | Score | Team 2 |
|---|---|---|
| FC Barcelona (Spain) | 77–67 | (Italy) Banco di Roma |
| Real Madrid (Spain) | 96–109 | (Socialist Federal Republic of Yugoslavia) Bosna |

Day 2, September 3, 1983

| Team 1 | Score | Team 2 |
|---|---|---|
| FC Barcelona (Spain) | 104–94 | (Socialist Federal Republic of Yugoslavia) Bosna |
| Real Madrid (Spain) | 94–101 | (Italy) Banco di Roma |

Day 3, September 4, 1983

| Team 1 | Score | Team 2 |
|---|---|---|
| FC Barcelona (Spain) | 82–69 | (Spain) Real Madrid |
| Bosna (Socialist Federal Republic of Yugoslavia) | 89–109 | (Italy) Banco di Roma |

== Final standings ==
| | Team | Pld | Pts | W | L | PF | PA | PD |
|---|---|---|---|---|---|---|---|---|
| 1. | (Spain) FC Barcelona | 3 | 6 | 3 | 0 | 263 | 230 | +33 |
| 2. | (Italy) Banco di Roma | 3 | 5 | 2 | 1 | 277 | 260 | +17 |
| 3. | (Socialist Federal Republic of Yugoslavia) Bosna | 3 | 4 | 1 | 2 | 292 | 309 | –17 |
| 4. | (Spain) Real Madrid | 3 | 3 | 0 | 3 | 259 | 292 | –33 |

1983 I ACB International Tournament Champions

FC Barcelona
1st title
