= 1989 FIBA European Super Cup =

Jugoplastika	Real Madrid
(Socialist Federal Republic of Yugoslavia)	(Spain)

First leg
Jugoplastika	Real Madrid
- Date: September 26, 1989
- Venue: Arena Gripe, Split

Second leg
Real Madrid	Jugoplastika
- Date: October 3, 1989
- Venue: Palacio de Deportes de la Comunidad de Madrid, Madrid

The 1989 FIBA European Super Cup was the 2nd edition of the FIBA European Super Cup for men's professional basketball clubs. In this second edition of the competition, which faced Jugoplastika, champions of the 1988–89 FIBA European Champions Cup, and Real Madrid, champions of the 1988–89 FIBA European Cup Winners' Cup, was due to take place on 26 September and on 3 October 1989, but finally was suspended and not organized by the late appearance of Jugoplastika, claiming the Yugoslav club was unwilling to make an economic effort for the trip (despite a month earlier to play the ACEB International Tournament), for a competition still young, so that Real Madrid (who was willing to play) would be proclaimed champion for the final appearance of the rival, although the tournament was suspended and not recorded in FIBA competitions, and Real Madrid was never given officially the trophy.
