= KK Split =

Basketball club in Split, Croatia

Split
- Nickname: Žuti (The Yellows)
- Leagues: Croatian League; Europe Cup
- Founded: 1945; 81 years ago
- History: KK Hajduk (1945–1949); KK Split (1949–1967, 1997–present); KK Jugoplastika (1967–1990); KK POP 84 (1990–1991); KK Slobodna Dalmacija (1991–1993); KK Croatia Osiguranje (1993–1997)
- Arena: Arena Gripe
- Capacity: 3,500
- Location: Split, Croatia
- Team colors: Yellow and black
- President: Ante Vuković
- General manager: Dejan Žaja
- Head coach: Damir Rančić
- Team captain: Ivan Perasović
- Championships: 3 EuroLeague; 2 Korać Cup; 3 Triple Crown; 1 Croatian League; 6 Croatian Cups; 6 Yugoslav Championships; 5 Yugoslav Cups
- Website: www.kk-split.com
Home	Away

Košarkaški klub Split (English: Split Basketball Club), commonly referred to as KK Split or simply Split, is a men's professional basketball club based in Split, Croatia. The club competes in the Croatian League.

Under its former name of KK Jugoplastika, the club was one of the most successful of the Yugoslav era, winning several national titles in the 1970s and the 1980s. By winning the FIBA European Champions Cup for three consecutive years, from 1989 to 1991, it is also one of the most successful clubs in the history of European basketball.

== History ==
The club's roots are found in Hajduk sports society's basketball section, which was established in 1945. After three years of mostly sporadic activity, in 1948, the club established its own organizational structure known as KK Hajduk, which was independent of sports society. In the next year, 1949, the club changed its name to KK Split.

After competing in the Yugoslav lower divisions for more than a decade, the club finally made it to the Yugoslav top-tier level Yugoslav First Federal League, for the 1963–64 season, and it stayed there until the breakup of Yugoslavia.

In 1967, the club adopted–for sponsorship reasons–the name Jugoplastika (Jugoplastika was a factory of clothing, accessories, and footwear products, made from thermoplastic materials and fiberglass; the original predecessor of AD Plastik), and kept it until the end of the 1989–90 season. In the next season, the club participated in the worldwide, national domestic, and European competitions, under the sponsorship of POP 84 (an Italian clothes company from Ancona).

KK Split is among the most successful clubs in European basketball history. They are, together with the first champions of the competition, Rīgas ASK, the only team to win the EuroLeague trophy three times in a row. In the years 1989, 1990, and 1991, the team, which was known back then as Jugoplastika and POP 84, with players like Dino Rađa, Toni Kukoč, Žan Tabak, Velimir Perasović and Zoran Savić, won the European top-tier level basketball trophy.

Apart from these successes, the club also reached the FIBA European Champions Cup final in 1972, and the FIBA European Cup Winners' Cup final in 1973. It lost both finals against the 1970s Italian League superpower Ignis Varese, and the Soviet Union League club Spartak Leningrad. KK Split also won back-to-back Korać Cup titles in 1976, against Chinamartini Torino, and in 1977, against Alco Bologna.

== Players ==
=== Current roster ===
Note: Flags indicate national team eligibility at FIBA-sanctioned events. Players may hold other non-FIBA nationalities not displayed.

KK Split roster
Players
Coaches

Pos.	No.	Nat.	Name	Ht.	Age
G	00	(Slovenia)	Rebec, Matic	1.82 m (6 ft 0 in)	31 – 24 January 1995
G	0	(United States)	Johnson, Nick	1.91 m (6 ft 3 in)	33 – 22 December 1992
PF	4	(Croatia)	Vuko, Tonko	2.03 m (6 ft 8 in)	32 – 7 July 1994
SF	5	(Croatia)	Salamunić, Martin	1.98 m (6 ft 6 in)	18 – 15 March 2008
G/F	8	(Croatia)	Runjić, Lovre	1.98 m (6 ft 6 in)	26 – 9 September 2000
G	10	(Croatia)	Kučić, Vito	1.91 m (6 ft 3 in)	24 – 28 March 2002
F	13	(Lithuania)	Kačinas, Mindaugas	2.03 m (6 ft 8 in)	33 – 30 June 1993
F	14	(Croatia)	Bajo, Darko	2.06 m (6 ft 9 in)	27 – 14 March 1999
G	24	(United States)	McLaughlin, Trenton	1.98 m (6 ft 6 in)	25 – 27 September 2001
F/C	44	(Germany) (Croatia)	Turudić, Benedikt	2.07 m (6 ft 9 in)	29 – 27 January 1997
G/F	88	(Croatia)	Gulin, Ivan	2.01 m (6 ft 7 in)	24 – 9 November 2001

Head coach

- (Croatia) Damir Rančić

Assistant coach(es)

- (Croatia) Ante Marović
- (Bosnia and Herzegovina) Andrija Stipanović

Legend

- (C) Team captain
- Injured

- Roster
Updated: October 8, 2026

=== Depth chart ===
Pos.	Starting 5	Bench 1	Bench 2
C	Benedikt Turudić	Darko Bajo	Tonko Vuko
PF	Mindaugas Kačinas	Ivan Gulin	Antonio Sikirić
SF	Zoran Dragić	Lovre Runjić	Martin Salamunić
SG	Trenton McLaughlin	Vito Kučić	Roko Jemo
PG	Nick Johnson	Matic Rebec	Teyvon Myers

=== FIBA Hall of Famers ===
KK Split Hall of Famers
Players
No.	Nat.	Name	Position	Tenure	Inducted
7	(Croatia)	Toni Kukoč	F	1985–1991	2017

== Honours ==
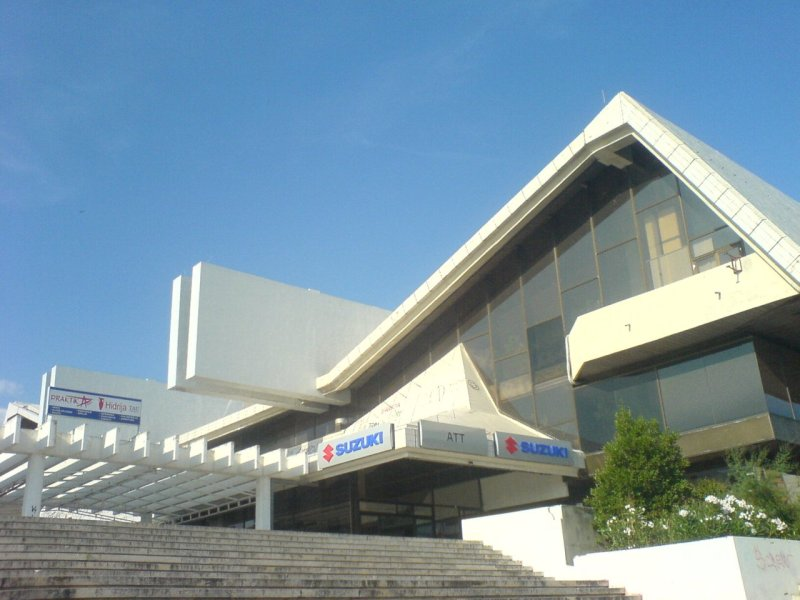
Arena Gripe

Total titles: 24

=== Domestic competitions ===
- Croatian League

Winners (1): 2002–03
Runners-up (8): 1992–93, 1993–94, 1995–96, 1996–97, 2000–01, 2007–08, 2020–21, 2022–23, 2023–24

- Croatian Cup

Winners (7): 1991–92, 1992–93, 1993–94, 1996–97, 2003–04, 2024–25, 2025-26
Runners-up (3): 1995–96, 1998–99, 2020–21

- Yugoslav League (defunct)

Winners (6): 1970–71, 1976–77, 1987–88, 1988–89, 1989–90, 1990–91
Runners-up (6): 1971–72, 1973–74, 1974–75, 1975–76, 1978–79, 1979–80

- Yugoslav Cup (defunct)

Winners (5): 1971–72, 1973–74, 1976–77, 1989–90, 1990–91
Runners-up (5): 1969–70, 1974–75, 1984–85, 1987–88, 1988–89

- Yugoslav League 1. B (defunct)

Winners (1): 1981–82

=== European competitions ===
- EuroLeague

Winners (3): 1988–89, 1989–90, 1990–91
Runners-up (1): 1971–72
Final Four (3): 1989, 1990, 1991

- FIBA Saporta Cup (defunct)

Runners-up (1): 1972–73
Semi-finalists (1): 1974–75

- FIBA Korać Cup (defunct)

Winners (2): 1975–76, 1976–77
Semi-finalists (3): 1973–74, 1978–79, 1979–80

- European Basketball Club Super Cup (semi-official, defunct)

Winners (1): 1990
Runners-up (2): 1988, 1989
4th place (1): 1991

=== Worldwide competitions ===
- FIBA Intercontinental Cup

4th place (1): 1973

- McDonald's Championship

Runners-up (2): 1989, 1990
4th place (1): 1991

=== Other competitions ===
- FIBA International Christmas Tournament (defunct)

Winners (1): 1989
Runners-up (1): 1990

=== Individual club awards ===
- Triple Crown

Winners (2): 1989–90, 1990–91

- Small Triple Crown

Winners (1): 1976–77

== Top performances in European competitions ==
Season	Achievement	Notes
EuroLeague
1971–72	Final	lost to Ignis Varese, 69–70 in the final (Tel Aviv)
1977–78	Semi-final group stage	5th place in a group with Real Madrid, Mobilgirgi Varese, ASVEL, Maccabi Tel Aviv and Alvik
1988–89	Champions	defeated FC Barcelona 87–77 in the semi-final, defeated Maccabi Tel Aviv 75–69 in the final of the Final Four in Munich
1989–90	Champions	defeated Limoges CSP 101–83 in the semi-final, defeated FC Barcelona Banca Catalana 72–67 in the final of the Final Four in Zaragoza
1990–91	Champions	defeated Scavolini Pesaro 93–87 in the semi-final, defeated FC Barcelona Banca Catalana 70–65 in the final of the Final Four in Paris
2000–01	Quarter-finals	eliminated by Efes Pilsen, 69–95 (L) in Istanbul, 72–64 (W) in Split and 59–82 (L) in Istanbul
FIBA Saporta Cup
1972–73	Final	lost to Spartak Leningrad, 62–77 in the final (Thessaloniki)
1974–75	Semi-finals	eliminated by Crvena zvezda, 88–76 (W) in Split and 63–81 (L) in Belgrade
1985–86	Quarter-finals	3rd place in a group with FC Barcelona, Scavolini Pesaro and Landis&Gyr Wien
1992–93	Quarter-finals	3rd place in a group with Sato Aris, Hapoel Galil Elyon, Benfica, Pitch Cholet and Budivelnyk
1993–94	Quarter-finals	3rd place in a group with Smelt Olimpija, Taugrés, Fidefinanz Bellinzona, Tofaş and Rabotnički
1994–95	Quarter-finals	3rd place in a group with Olympique Antibes, Iraklis Aspis Pronoia, Maes Flandria, Kyiv and Fidefinanz Bellinzona
FIBA Korać Cup
1973–74	Semi-finals	eliminated by Partizan, 97–108 (L) in Belgrade and 85–75 (W) in Split
1975–76	Champions	defeated Chinamartini Torino, 97–84 (W) in Split and 82–82 (D) in Turin in the double finals of Korać Cup
1976–77	Champions	defeated Alco Bologna, 87–84 in the final of Korać Cup in Genoa
1978–79	Semi-finals	eliminated by Partizan, 96–97 (L) in Split and 96–98 (L) in Belgrade
1979–80	Semi-finals	eliminated by Arrigoni Rieti, 75–86 (L) in Rieti and 104–97 (W) in Split
FIBA Intercontinental Cup
1973	4th	4th place in a group with Ignis Varese, Sírio, Vaqueros de Bayamón and Lexington Marathon Oilers
McDonald's Championship
1989	Final	defeated Philips Milano 102–97 in the semi-final, lost to Denver Nuggets 129–139 in the final (Rome)
1990	Final	defeated FC Barcelona Banca Catalana 102–97 in the semi-final, lost to New York Knicks 101–117 in the final (Barcelona)
1991	4th	4th place in Paris, lost to Montigalà Joventut 86–117 in the semi-final, lost to Limoges CSP 91–105 in the 3rd place game

== The road to the European Cup victories ==
1975–76 FIBA Korać Cup

Round	Team	Home	Away
2nd	(Greece) Panellinios	105–61	63–78
Top 16	(Belgium) Standard Liège	78–71	87–83
Top 16	(France) Berck	90–69	79–99
Top 16	(Italy) Mobilquatro Milano	99–83	100–101
SF	(Italy) Sinudyne Bologna	74–83	92–79
F	(Italy) Chinamartini Torino	97–84	82–82

1976–77 FIBA Korać Cup

Round	Team	Home	Away
2nd	Bye (as title holder)		
Top 12	(Belgium) Standard Liège	88–84	91–75
Top 12	(Italy) Canon Venezia	102–88	95–66
SF	(Italy) IBP Stella Azzurra	96–71	76–87
F	(Italy) Alco Bologna	87–84	

1988–89 FIBA European Champions Cup

Round	Team	Home	Away
Top 16	(Portugal) Ovarense	113–76	94–87
QF	(France) Limoges CSP	87–78	93–95
QF	(Italy) Scavolini Pesaro	88–65	75–88
QF	(Netherlands) Nashua EBBC	86–79	88–83
QF	(Spain) FC Barcelona	84–79	70–79
QF	(Greece) Aris	94–83	85–96
QF	(Soviet Union) CSKA Moscow	89–77	77–91
QF	(Israel) Maccabi Tel Aviv	85–86	90–102
SF	(Spain) FC Barcelona	87–77	
F	(Israel) Maccabi Tel Aviv	75–69	

1989–90 FIBA European Champions Cup

Round	Team	Home	Away
Top 16	(Scotland) MIM Livingston	122–65	97–84
QF	(Spain) FC Barcelona Banca Catalana	86–73	73–79
QF	(Italy) Philips Milano	95–89	84–73
QF	(France) Limoges CSP	103–83	93–100
QF	(Netherlands) Commodore Den Helder	105–78	83–76
QF	(Israel) Maccabi Tel Aviv	79–61	93–87
QF	(Greece) Aris	85–89	80–79
QF	(Poland) Lech Poznań	98–74	120–73
SF	(France) Limoges CSP	101–83	
F	(Spain) FC Barcelona Banca Catalana	72–67	

1990–91 FIBA European Champions Cup

Round	Team	Home	Away
Top 16	(Turkey) Galatasaray	101–70	97–86
QF	(Italy) Scavolini Pesaro	86–66	106–105
QF	(England) Kingston Kings	91–72	89–87
QF	(Spain) FC Barcelona Banca Catalana	87–91	85–92
QF	(Greece) Aris	93–63	71–92
QF	(Germany) Bayer 04 Leverkusen	85–84	103–87
QF	(Israel) Maccabi Tel Aviv	70–72	65–103
QF	(France) Limoges CSP	92–88	84–73
SF	(Italy) Scavolini Pesaro	93–87	
F	(Spain) FC Barcelona Banca Catalana	70–65	

Between 1989 and 1991 Split dominated the FIBA European Champions Cup (EuroLeague). Head coach, Božidar Maljković, put together arguably one of the most talented young team: featuring Toni Kukoč, Dino Rađa, Žan Tabak, Velimir Perasović, Zoran Sretenović, and Luka Pavićević, who joined forces with veterans like Duško Ivanović. In 1989, Jugoplastika reached the Final Four, along with heavy favorites FC Barcelona, Maccabi Tel Aviv, and the competitive Aris. Kukoč had 24 points and Ivanović had 21, to lead Split past FC Barcelona, by a score of 89–77, in the semi-finals. Once in the final, Jugoplastika edged Maccabi 75–69, behind 20 points from Rađa, and 18 from Kukoč.

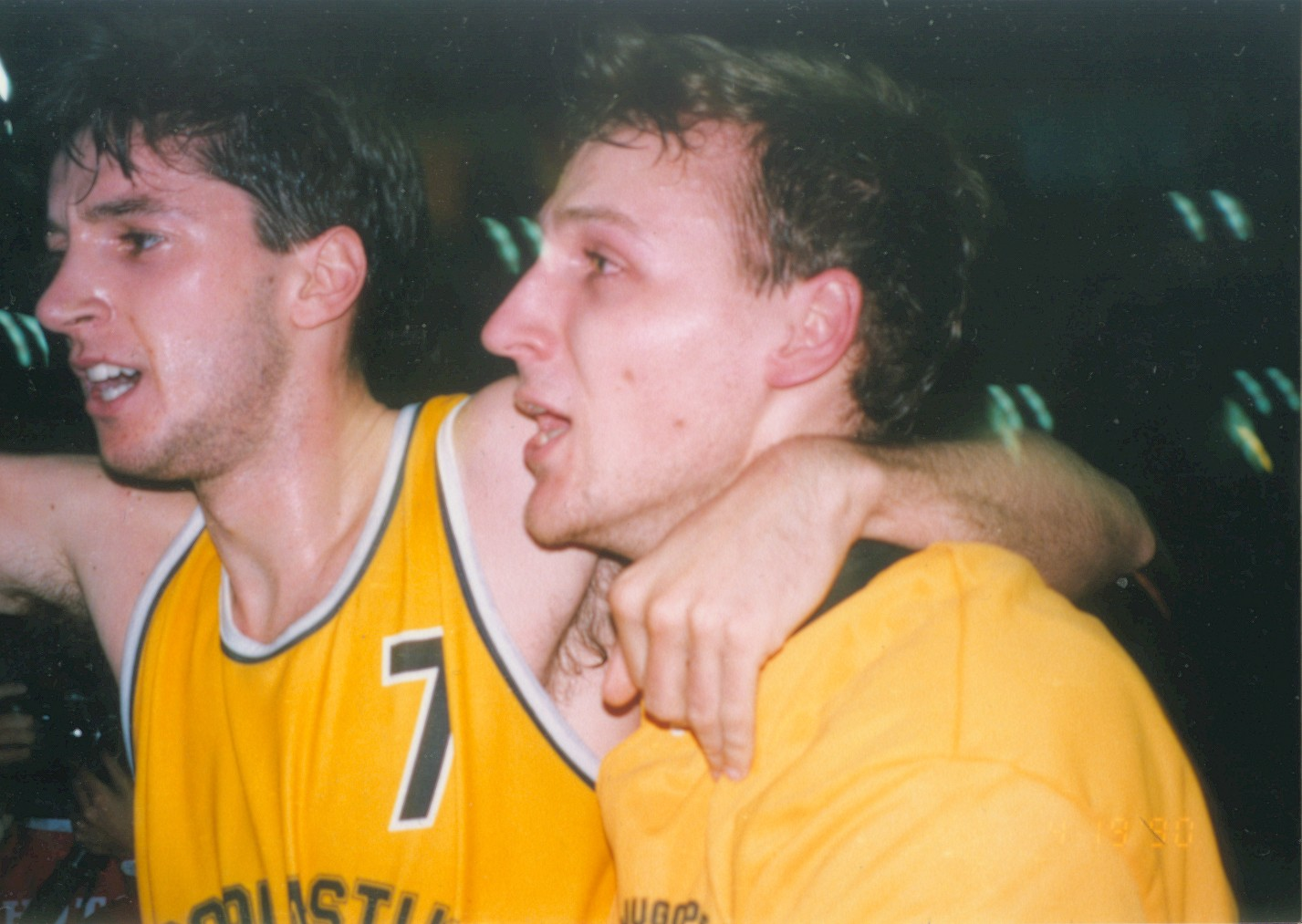
Toni Kukoč with Dino Rađa, after the victorious 1990 Champions Cup final against FC Barcelona, in Zaragoza.

Jugoplastika met FC Barcelona again, in the 1990 FIBA European Champions Cup Final Four, in Zaragoza, Spain. FC Barcelona was backed by thousands of fans, and managed to get a brief 61–59 lead, late in the second half, but Kukoč buried a couple of critical three-pointers, that sent Jugoplastika on its way to its second straight title. Kukoč finished the game with 20 points, and the EuroLeague Final Four MVP award, in his magic hands.

In most places, one can find that the European champions in 1991, were called POP 84, but that was just the name of the sponsor under which the players of KK Split were playing that season. Despite being without Dino Rađa and Duško Ivanović, the team from Split was led by Toni Kukoč, and Zoran Savić, to their third consecutive title. Since the time when Rīgas ASK of the USSR League, won three straight European titles, in 1958, 1959, and 1960, no other team had won three in a row. And in the Final Four era, only two other teams besides Jugoplastika have been able to win two consecutively (Maccabi Tel Aviv in 2004 and 2005, and Olympiacos in 2012, and 2013).

In 1991, the competition provided some big surprises, leading up to the Final Four at Paris. English club Kingston Kings of the British Basketball League, eliminated CSKA Moscow, and what is more, with a double victory, 93–77 at home and 72–74 in Moscow. German club Bayer 04 Leverkusen of the Basketball Bundesliga, made its debut in the third round, but the other faces were well known to everyone: FC Barcelona Banca Catalana ended first in that phase (11–3), POP 84 was second (9–5), and the other two Final Four teams would be Scavolini Pesaro and Maccabi Tel Aviv, tied at 8–6. Once again, the first team of the previous round did not get the title. In a rematch of the previous year's final – an occurrence that has not been repeated since – the team from Split won 70–65, almost identical to the 1990 score (72–67). Thanks to a great performance by Savić, who scored 27 points, Jugoplastika had an historic three–peat.

== Seasons in Yugoslavia ==
Split participated in the Yugoslav First Basketball League from the 1964 season, until the breakup of Yugoslavia, in summer of 1991 (except for 1981–82 season, when the club was relegated to the 2nd-tier level Yugoslav 1. B Federal Basketball League).

Pos.	64	65	66	67	68	69	70	71	72	73	74	75	76	77	78	79	80	81	82	83	84	85	86	87	88	89	90	91
1								1						1											1	1	1	1
2									2		2	2	2			2	2											
3						3	3								3									3				
4																												
5			5																									
6		6		6	6					6													6					
7																												
8																				8								
9	9																											
10																					10	10						
11																		11										
12																												
1B																			1									

== Notable players ==
Note: Flags indicate national team eligibility at FIBA-sanctioned events. Players may hold other non-FIBA nationalities not displayed.

Criteria

To appear in this section a player must have either:

- Set a club record or won an individual award while at the club
- Played at least one official international match for their national team at any time
- Played at least one official NBA match at any time.

- (Croatia) Branko Radović
- (Croatia) Ratomir Tvrdić
- (Croatia) Josip Vranković
- (Croatia) Roko Leni Ukić
- (Croatia) Nikola Vujčić
- (Croatia) Dino Rađa
- (Croatia) Damir Šolman
- (Croatia) Duje Krstulović
- (Croatia) Toni Kukoč
- (Croatia) Velimir Perasović
- (Croatia) Zoran Čutura
- (Croatia) Petar Skansi
- (Croatia) Ivica Dukan
- (Croatia) Željko Jerkov
- (Croatia) Damjan Rudež
- (Croatia) Žan Tabak
- (Croatia) Ivica Burić
- (Croatia) Aramis Naglić
- (Croatia) Luka Babić
- (Croatia) Andrija Žižić
- (Croatia) Nikola Prkačin
- (Albania) Ermal Kuqo
- (Croatia) Krešimir Lončar
- (Croatia) Franjo Arapović
- (Croatia) Damir Rančić
- (Croatia) Teo Čizmić
- (Croatia) Franko Kaštropil
- (Croatia) Srđan Subotić
- (Croatia) Ante Grgurević
- (Croatia) Ante Toni Žižić
- (Croatia) Dragan Bender
- (Croatia) Ante Delaš
- (Croatia) Mario Delaš
- (Croatia) Josip Sobin
- (Croatia) Ivan Siriščević
- (Croatia) Bruno Šundov
- (Croatia) Toni Dijan
- (Croatia) Filip Krušlin
- (Croatia) Hrvoje Perić
- (North Macedonia) Petar Naumoski
- (Montenegro) Luka Pavićević
- (Montenegro) Duško Ivanović
- (Belize) Marlon Garnett
- (Puerto Rico) Larry Ayuso
- (Slovenia) Jurij Zdovc
- (Slovenia) Peter Vilfan
- (Serbia) Zoran Sretenović
- (Serbia) Zoran Savić
- (United States) Terrence Rencher
- (United States) Steve Colter
- (United States) Ray "Sugar" Richardson
- (United States) Avie Lester
- (United States) Jamon Gordon
- (Bosnia and Herzegovina) Damir Mršić
- (Bosnia and Herzegovina) Andrija Stipanović
- (Bulgaria) Dejan Ivanov

=== Players at the NBA draft ===
^	Denotes player who has been inducted to the Naismith Memorial Basketball Hall of Fame

Position	Player	Year	Round	Pick	Drafted by
PF/C	(Socialist Federal Republic of Yugoslavia) Dino Rađa^{^}	1989	2nd round	40th	Boston Celtics
SF/PF	(Socialist Federal Republic of Yugoslavia) Toni Kukoč^{^}	1990	2nd round	29th	Chicago Bulls
C	(Socialist Federal Republic of Yugoslavia) Žan Tabak	1991	2nd round	51st	Houston Rockets
C	(Croatia) Bruno Šundov	1998	2nd round	35th	Dallas Mavericks
PG/SG	(Croatia) Roko Ukić	2005	2nd round	41st	Toronto Raptors

== Head coaches ==
- (Croatia) Enzo Sovitti
- (Croatia) Branko Radović
- (Socialist Federal Republic of Yugoslavia) Srđan Kalember
- (Croatia) Petar Skansi
- (Croatia) Matan Rimac
- (Croatia) Zoran Grašo
- (Croatia) Krešimir Ćosić
- (Serbia) Zoran Slavnić
- (Serbia) Božidar Maljković
- (Croatia) Željko Pavličević
- (Slovenia) (Greece) Slobodan Subotić
- (Croatia) Josip "Pino" Grdović
- (Croatia) Predrag Kruščić
