= 1986 FIBA European Super Cup =

Cibona	FC Barcelona
(Socialist Federal Republic of Yugoslavia)	(Spain)
189	200

First leg
Cibona	FC Barcelona
102	101
- Date: October 7, 1986
- Venue: Dom Sportova, Zagreb

Second leg
FC Barcelona	Cibona
99	87
- Date: October 28, 1986
- Venue: Palau Blaugrana, Barcelona

The 1986 FIBA European Super Cup was the 1st official edition of the FIBA European Super Cup for men's professional basketball clubs. The 2 game aggregate score tournament took place at the Dom Sportova arena in Zagreb, Yugoslavia, on October 7, 1986, and at the Palau Blaugrana, Barcelona, Spain, on October 28, 1986, in order to determine the unofficial European club super champion. The tournament was contested between the 1985–86 season FIBA European Champions Cup champions, Cibona, and the 1985–86 season FIBA European Cup Winners' Cup champions, FC Barcelona.

== Series summary ==
=== Game 1 ===
October 7

Cibona (Socialist Federal Republic of Yugoslavia)	102–101	(Spain) FC Barcelona
Scoring by quarter: 49–55
Pts: D. Petrović 47		Pts: Trumbo 32

Dom Sportova, Zagreb
Attendance: 12,000

=== Game 2 ===
October 28

FC Barcelona (Spain)	99–87	(Socialist Federal Republic of Yugoslavia) Cibona
Scoring by quarter: 51–47
Pts: Sibilio 20		Pts: D. Petrović 23

Palau Blaugrana, Barcelona
Attendance: 5,500

1986 FIBA European Super Cup Champions

FC Barcelona
3rd title
