= 1989 VII ACB International Tournament "VI Memorial Héctor Quiroga" =

- Sport: Basketball
- Finals champions: (Spain) Real Madrid
- Runners-up: (Socialist Federal Republic of Yugoslavia) Jugoplastika

European Basketball Club Super Cup seasons
- ← 1988 VI ACB International Tournament "V Memorial Héctor Quiroga" 1989 FIBA European Super Cup 1990 VIII ACB International Tournament "VII Memorial Héctor Quiroga" →

The 1989 VII ACB International Tournament "VI Memorial Héctor Quiroga" was the 7th semi-official edition of the European Basketball Club Super Cup.

It took place at Pabellón Municipal de Puerto Real, Puerto Real, Spain, on 8, 9 and 10 October 1989 with the participations of Jugoplastika (champions of the 1988–89 FIBA European Champions Cup), Real Madrid (champions of the 1988–89 FIBA European Cup Winner's Cup), FC Barcelona Banca Catalana (champions of the 1988–89 Liga ACB) and Philips Milano (champions of the 1988–89 Serie A1 FIP). Fourteen days earlier (on 26 September and on 3 October) was due to take place the 1989 FIBA European Super Cup, but finally was suspended and not organized by the late appearance of Jugoplastika, claiming the Yugoslav club was unwilling to make an economic effort for the trip (despite some days later to play the ACB International Tournament), for a competition still young.

== League stage ==
Day 1, October 8, 1989

Team 1	Score	Team 2
FC Barcelona Banca Catalana (Spain)	101–113	(Italy) Philips Milano
Real Madrid (Spain)	72–71	(Socialist Federal Republic of Yugoslavia) Jugoplastika

Day 2, October 9, 1989

Team 1	Score	Team 2
FC Barcelona Banca Catalana (Spain)	75–86	(Spain) Real Madrid
Jugoplastika (Socialist Federal Republic of Yugoslavia)	99–95	(Italy) Philips Milano

Day 3, October 10, 1989

Team 1	Score	Team 2
Real Madrid (Spain)	124–117	(Italy) Philips Milano
FC Barcelona Banca Catalana (Spain)	83–88	(Socialist Federal Republic of Yugoslavia) Jugoplastika

== Final standings ==
	Team	Pld	Pts	W	L	PF	PA	PD
1.	(Spain) Real Madrid	3	6	3	0	282	263	+19
2.	(Socialist Federal Republic of Yugoslavia) Jugoplastika	3	5	2	1	258	250	+8
3.	(Italy) Philips Milano	3	4	1	2	325	324	+1
4.	(Spain) FC Barcelona Banca Catalana	3	3	0	3	259	287	–28

1989 VII ACB International Tournament "VI Memorial Héctor Quiroga" Champions

Real Madrid
3rd title
