= 1984 II ACB International Tournament "I Memorial Héctor Quiroga" =

- Sport: Basketball
- Finals champions: (Spain) Real Madrid
- Runners-up: (France) Orthez

European Basketball Club Super Cup seasons
- ← 1983 I ACB International Tournament 1985 III ACB International Tournament "II Memorial Héctor Quiroga" →

The 1984 II ACB International Tournament "I Memorial Héctor Quiroga" was the 2nd semi-official edition of the European Basketball Club Super Cup. It took place at Polideportivo Antonio Magariños, Madrid, Spain, on 22, 23 and 24 September 1984 with the participations of Real Madrid (champions of the 1983–84 FIBA European Cup Winner's Cup), Orthez (champions of the 1983–84 FIBA Korać Cup), Granarolo Bologna (champions of the 1983–84 FIP Serie A1) and Indesit Caserta (runners-up of the 1983–84 FIP Serie A1).

== League stage ==
Day 1, September 21, 1984

| Team 1 | Score | Team 2 |
|---|---|---|
| Real Madrid (Spain) | 102–97 | (Italy) Indesit Caserta |
| Orthez (France) | 105–93 | (Italy) Granarolo Bologna |

Day 2, September 22, 1984

| Team 1 | Score | Team 2 |
|---|---|---|
| Real Madrid (Spain) | 95–75 | (France) Orthez |
| Indesit Caserta (Italy) | 102–78 | (Italy) Granarolo Bologna |

Day 3, September 23, 1984

| Team 1 | Score | Team 2 |
|---|---|---|
| Real Madrid (Spain) | 91–85 | (Spain) Granarolo Bologna |
| Orthez (France) | 76–75 | (Italy) Indesit Caserta |

== Final standings ==
| | Team | Pld | Pts | W | L | PF | PA | PD |
|---|---|---|---|---|---|---|---|---|
| 1. | (Spain) Real Madrid | 3 | 6 | 3 | 0 | 288 | 257 | +31 |
| 2. | (France) Orthez | 3 | 5 | 2 | 1 | 256 | 263 | –7 |
| 3. | (Italy) Indesit Caserta | 3 | 4 | 1 | 2 | 274 | 256 | +18 |
| 4. | (Italy) Granarolo Bologna | 3 | 3 | 0 | 3 | 256 | 298 | –42 |

1984 II ACB International Tournament "I Memorial Héctor Quiroga" Champions

Real Madrid
1st title
