= 1986 Copa del Rey de Baloncesto =

The 1986 Copa del Rey was the 50th edition of the Spanish basketball Cup. It was organized by the ACB and its Final Eight was played in Barcelona, in the Palau Blaugrana between 17 and 19 December 1986.

This edition was played by the two first qualified teams of the 1986–87 ACB first stage.

== Qualified teams ==
Group Odd

| Team | Pld | W | L | PF | PA | PD | Pts |
|---|---|---|---|---|---|---|---|
| Real Madrid | 14 | 12 | 2 | 1383 | 1097 | +286 | 26 |
| FC Barcelona | 14 | 12 | 2 | 1429 | 1178 | +251 | 26 |

Group Even

| Team | Pld | W | L | PF | PA | PD | Pts |
|---|---|---|---|---|---|---|---|
| Ron Negrita Joventut | 14 | 13 | 1 | 1355 | 1167 | +188 | 27 |
| CAI Zaragoza | 14 | 11 | 3 | 1293 | 1216 | +77 | 25 |

== Bracket ==
Semifinals; 17 December
Real Madrid | 100
CAI Zaragoza | 96
Ron Negrita Joventut | 120
FC Barcelona | 115

Final; 19 December
Real Madrid | 87
Ron Negrita Joventut | 79
Third place game
FC Barcelona | 102
CAI Zaragoza | 99

== Final ==
19 December 1985
18:45 GTM+1

Boxscore

| Real Madrid | 87–79 | Ron Negrita Joventut |
Scoring by half: 35–35, 52–44
| Pts: Biriukov, Iturriaga 18; Rebs: Robinson, Townes 5 Asts: Biriukov 22; PIR: Biriukov 22 | | Pts: Villacampa 20; Rebs: Stewart 8 Asts: Jiménez, Montero 1 PIR: Stewart 21 |

Palau Blaugrana, Barcelona
Attendance: 4,500
Referees: Francisco Javier Fajardo, Víctor Mas

1986 Copa del Rey champions

Real Madrid
20th title
