= 1988 VI ACB International Tournament "V Memorial Héctor Quiroga" =

- Sport: Basketball
- Finals champions: (Spain) Real Madrid
- Runners-up: (Socialist Federal Republic of Yugoslavia) Jugoplastika

European Basketball Club Super Cup seasons
- ← 1987 V ACB International Tournament "IV Memorial Héctor Quiroga" 1989 VII ACB International Tournament "VI Memorial Héctor Quiroga" →

The 1988 VI ACB International Tournament "V Memorial Héctor Quiroga" was the 6th semi-official edition of the European Basketball Club Super Cup. It took place at Pabellón Municipal de Puerto Real, Puerto Real, Spain, on 11, 12 and 13 October 1988 with the participations of Real Madrid (champions of the 1987–88 FIBA Korać Cup), FC Barcelona (champions of the 1987–88 Liga ACB), Jugoplastika (champions of the 1987–88 First Federal Basketball League) and CSKA Moscow (champions of the 1987–88 Supreme League).

== League stage ==
Day 1, October 11, 1988

Team 1	Score	Team 2
FC Barcelona (Spain)	83–86	(Socialist Federal Republic of Yugoslavia) Jugoplastika
Real Madrid (Spain)	82–79	(Soviet Union) CSKA Moscow

Day 2, October 12, 1988

Team 1	Score	Team 2
FC Barcelona (Spain)	81–86	(Spain) Real Madrid
Jugoplastika (Socialist Federal Republic of Yugoslavia)	107–90	(Soviet Union) CSKA Moscow

Day 3, October 13, 1988

Team 1	Score	Team 2
FC Barcelona (Spain)	85–90	(Soviet Union) CSKA Moscow
Real Madrid (Spain)	95–88	(Socialist Federal Republic of Yugoslavia) Jugoplastika

== Final standings ==
	Team	Pld	Pts	W	L	PF	PA	PD
1.	(Spain) Real Madrid	3	6	3	0	263	248	+15
2.	(Socialist Federal Republic of Yugoslavia) Jugoplastika	3	5	2	1	281	268	+13
3.	(Soviet Union) CSKA Moscow	3	4	1	2	259	274	–15
4.	(Spain) FC Barcelona	3	3	0	3	249	262	–13

1988 VI ACB International Tournament "V Memorial Héctor Quiroga" Champions

Real Madrid
2nd title
