= European Basketball Club Super Cup =

European Basketball Competition

European Super Cup
- Sport: Basketball
- Founded: 1983
- Folded: 1991
- Continent: Europe
- Last champions: (Israel) Maccabi Elite Tel Aviv (1st title)
- Most titles: (Spain) FC Barcelona (Spain) Real Madrid (3 titles)

The European Super Cup was a semi-official professional men's basketball club tournament that was held by ACB, and FIBA on one occasion. It took place between 1983 and 1991. It was played between the winners of the European-wide top-tier level league, the FIBA European Champions Cup (now called EuroLeague), and the winners of the European-wide secondary level league, the FIBA European Cup Winners' Cup (later called FIBA Saporta Cup) and various guests, usually the Spanish champions. The only official tournaments organised by FIBA were in 1986 and 1989.

== Results ==
Year	Champions	Second place	Third place	Fourth place	Results / Notes
1983; Details	(Spain); FC Barcelona	(Italy); Banco di Roma	(Socialist Federal Republic of Yugoslavia); Bosna	(Spain); Real Madrid	Four team league stage.
1984; Details	(Spain); Real Madrid	(France); Orthez	(Italy); Indesit Caserta	(Italy); Granarolo Bologna	Four team league stage.
1985; Details	(United States); Winston All Star	(France); Limoges CSP	(Italy); Simac Milano	(Spain); Real Madrid	Four team league stage.
1986; Details	(Spain); FC Barcelona	(Spain); Real Madrid	(Socialist Federal Republic of Yugoslavia); Cibona	(Italy); Tracer Milano	Four team league stage.
1986; Details	(Spain); FC Barcelona	(Socialist Federal Republic of Yugoslavia); Cibona	N/A	N/A	200–189 (101–102 / 99–87)
1987; Details	(Socialist Federal Republic of Yugoslavia); Cibona	(Spain); FC Barcelona	(Spain); Ram Joventut	(Italy); Tracer Milano	Four team league stage.
1988; Details	(Spain); Real Madrid	(Socialist Federal Republic of Yugoslavia); Jugoplastika	(Soviet Union); CSKA Moscow	(Spain); FC Barcelona	Four team league stage.
1989; Details	N/A	N/A	N/A	N/A	N/A
1989; Details	(Spain); Real Madrid	(Socialist Federal Republic of Yugoslavia); Jugoplastika	(Italy); Philips Milano	(Spain); FC Barcelona Banca Catalana	Four team league stage.
1990; Details	(Socialist Federal Republic of Yugoslavia); POP 84	(Spain); Montigalà Joventut	(Israel); Maccabi Elite Tel Aviv	(Spain); FC Barcelona Banca Catalana	Four team league stage.
1991; Details	(Israel); Maccabi Elite Tel Aviv	(Spain); Montigalà Joventut	(Spain); FC Barcelona Banca Catalana	(Croatia); Slobodna Dalmacija	Four team league stage.

== Titles by club ==
Rank	Club	Titles	Runner-up	Champion Years
1.	(Spain) FC Barcelona	3	1	1983, 1986, 1986
2.	(Spain) Real Madrid	3	1	1984, 1988, 1989
3.	(Socialist Federal Republic of Yugoslavia) Split	1	2	1990
4.	(Socialist Federal Republic of Yugoslavia) Cibona	1	1	1987
5.	(United States) Winston All Star	1		1985
6.	(Israel) Maccabi Tel Aviv	1		1991
7.	(Spain) Joventut Badalona		2
8.	(Italy) Virtus Roma		1
9.	(France) Pau-Lacq-Orthez		1
10.	(France) Limoges CSP		1

== Titles by nation ==
Rank	Country	Titles	Runners-up
1.	Spain	6	4
2.	(Socialist Federal Republic of Yugoslavia) Yugoslavia	2	3
3.	United States	1
4.	Israel	1
5.	France		2
6.	Italy		1

== See also ==
- FIBA Europe SuperCup Women
- EuroLeague SuperCup
- Rosters of the top basketball teams in European club competitions
