= Puerto Real =

- Municipality
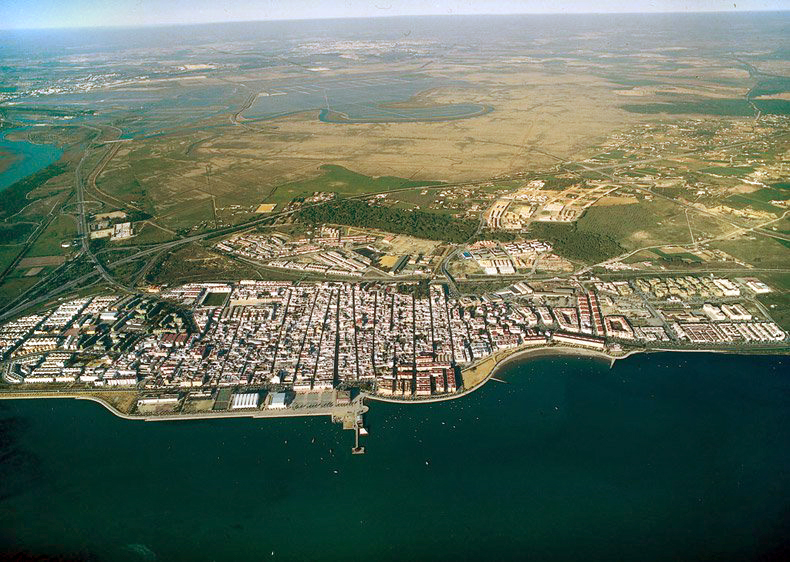

- Flag Coat of arms
- Interactive map of Puerto Real
- Location within Spain
- Coordinates: 36°31′45″N 6°11′31″W
- Country: Spain
- Autonomous community: Andalusia
- Province: Cádiz
- Founded: 1483

Government
  - Mayor: Aurora Salvador

Area
  - Total: 195.96 km^{2} (75.66 sq mi)
- Elevation: 8 m (26 ft)

Population (2025-01-01)
  - Total: 42,527
  - Density: 217.02/km^{2} (562.08/sq mi)
- Demonym: Puertorrealeños
- Time zone: UTC+1 (CET)
  - Summer (DST): UTC+2 (CEST)
- Postal code: 11510
- Patron saint: Our Lady of Lourdes
- Website: Official website

Puerto Real (Spanish pronunciation: [ˈpweɾto reˈal]) is a municipality of Spain, belonging to the province of Cádiz, in the autonomous community of Andalusia. As of 2024, it had a population of 42,151.

The town is located on the northern shore of the inner lobe of the Bay of Cádiz. It was established in 1483 by the Catholic Monarchs as a royal demesne port town off the Atlantic coast. Puerto Real boasts public squares and broad streets; it also has a town-hall building and a 16th-century church, which was constructed in several styles (Gothic, Renaissance, Baroque).

== Geography ==
The town of Puerto Real has two separate zones with two separate characters, a maritime zone and a hinterland zone. Central Puerto Real lies entirely within the maritime zone, facing, as it does, the Bay of Cadiz and the Atlantic Ocean beyond. The inland zone, the so-called hinterland, is far larger in area but far less populated.

Puerto Real borders the towns and cities of San Fernando to the southwest, Chiclana de la Frontera to the south, Medina Sidonia to the southeast, Jerez de la Frontera to the north and northeast, and El Puerto de Santa Maria to the northwest.

A good portion of the periphery of Puerto Real lies within the Bay of Cádiz Natural Reserve, an area known for its salt marshes; the reeds of the marshes are the raw material for weaving mats that form the walls of cages in fish-farming enterprises (pisciculture). These wetlands, composed of lagoons as well as salt marshes, welcome, in the spring and autumn, huge flocks of migratory birds en route to their new seasonal homes. Also, on the outskirts of Puerto Real, there are several notable pine forests, among them, Las Canteras (the Forest of Quarries) and La Algaida (Mare's Meadow Forest). Because of its forests and estuarine marshes, Puerto Real is sometimes called the "green lung" of the Bay of Cádiz.

The San Pedro river, an arm of the Guadalete river, flows along the northwestern edge of the town, separating Puerto Real from neighboring El Puerto de Santa Maria. Puerto Real is united to Cádiz by the José León de Carranza Bridge, named for a former mayor of Cádiz. As of 2007, a second bridge was planned.

Other aspects of Puerto Real's geography are the many kilometers of gorges, ravines, and artificially created footpaths that traverse the municipality. Among them is a long green corridor, constituting one end of the Two Bays Trail that unites the two large bays of the province of Cádiz, the Bay of Cádiz and the Bay of Algeciras.

There are also two concentrations of population within the municipal limits of Puerto Real that are not contiguous with the central part of the city; they are called the District of Jarana and the District of the San Pedro (river).

== History ==
There are vestiges of both prehistoric and Roman settlements in Puerto Real that bear witness to the fact that the land on which the modern city is sited has been inhabited for a very long time. Along with the likes of El Puerto de Santa María and Dehesa de Bolaños, Puerto Real is one of the proposed locations for the Roman settlement of Portus Gaditanus ('the Port of Gades'), the maritime appendage of the Roman colonia, Gades (Cádiz), across the narrow end of the bay.

The Catholic Monarchs founded the town of Puerto Real in 1483 as a royal demesne powerbase (in an otherwise profoundly manorialized territory) for naval operations in North Africa, primarily involving privateering and coastal raids. Powerful nobles already dominated all of the other ports of western Andalusia (Cádiz, Huelva, and, to a lesser extent, Seville). From the time of its founding, Puerto Real's prosperity was closely tied to the fortunes of these other Atlantic ports, especially Cádiz, which soon grew rich from its commerce with America.

In 1820, there was a popular liberal revolt in Spain, led by the constitutionalist and patriot, Rafael del Riego y Nunez (1785–1823), that sought to reinstate the liberal constitution that had been proclaimed in 1812. This revolt led to the imprisonment of King Ferdinand VII in Cádiz and the convening of the liberal Cortes in that city. An international conference of monarchist powers, the Congress of Verona, in October 1822, deputized France to secure Ferdinand's release and restore absolutism in Spain. The invading French army, known as the Hundred Thousand Children of St. Louis (France's patron saint), took Madrid, and, on 7 April 1823, laid siege to Cádiz from positions in Puerto Real and nearby San Fernando. Initially, French artillery barrages failed to cause the fall of the city. Riego's forces held the strategic Fort San Luis on the island of Trocadero at the extreme south end of the Bay of Cádiz, between Cádiz and Puerto Real. When the fort's defenders succumbed to a French assault on 31 August 1823, Trocadero was lost, and so, in effect, was the liberal cause. The remaining defenders of Cádiz, smarting from their loss at the Battle of Trocadero and despairing of the possibility of reinforcement, sued for peace. They made an agreement that resulted in the release and reinstatement of Ferdinand VII. In exchange, the liberals secured promises of an amnesty for their fighters and for the members of the dissident Cortes; the agents of the king also agreed to the establishment of a form of constitutional monarchy where the principles of the 1812 constitution were supposed to be respected.

In the process of besieging Cádiz, the French succeeded in destroying a large part of Puerto Real, including its water delivery and sanitation systems. Perhaps it was because of these events that Puerto Real was regularly beset by epidemics throughout much of the 19th century.

Another reminder in Puerto Real of the time of the French invasion is the Cortadura canal that allows passage across the base of the peninsula of Cádiz. The canal is not a natural waterway; it was constructed by the Spanish in an attempt to prevent the French artillery from drawing closer to the walls of the city.

At the end of the 19th century, Puerto Real experienced an industrial boom, thanks to the creation of modern shipyards by Antonio López. New technological advances and the new industries drastically modified the appearance of Puerto Real. To make room for the new shipyards and warehouses, a working-class neighborhood, Matagorda, was leveled, but new neighborhoods, like the River San Pedro and Marquesado districts, sprang up.

== Economy ==
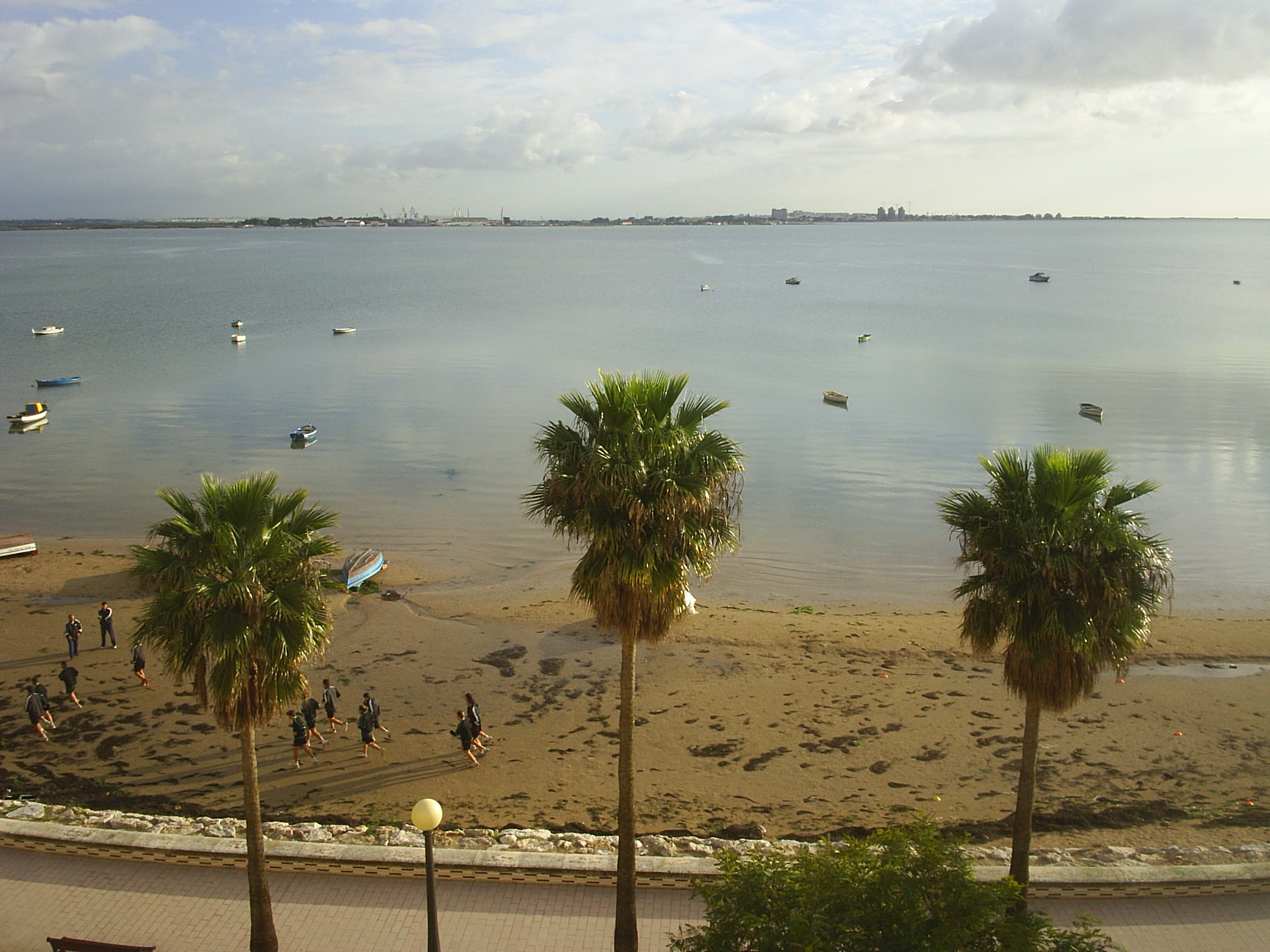
Playa of the Cap.

Puerto Real is a city with an economy based almost exclusively on industry.

=== Shipbuilding and marine repairs ===
The shipbuilding industry, for centuries the backbone of the local economy, has experienced serious economic setbacks during the recent 10–15 years, due to competition from other shipbuilders, mostly in South East Asia. Shipyard industry in Spain and most of Europe has been unable to compete with their Asian counterparts due to a number of factors including lower wages, economies of scale, and more efficient production methods.

=== Aeronautical fabrication ===
Unlike the shipbuilding industry, which is in decline, the airplane-building industry is doing well. Airbus operates a factory in Puerto Real responsible for the construction of the tail stabilizer assembly, the rudder, and the belly fairing of the Airbus A380 airplane. The Puerto Real facility is also involved in fabrication of the lateral drawer of the A320 airplane and rudder assemblies for the A330 and the A340.

=== Auto parts ===
Puerto Real was the home of a Delphi auto parts plant associated with General Motors. The plant was closed in 2007.

=== Large-scale construction ===
Local companies are involved in off-shore dredging. Also, a Puerto Real concern has built one of the largest off-shore natural-gas drilling platforms in the world.

=== Other industries ===
Many small and medium-sized companies supply services and manual labor for the other industrial enterprises in the area. The crisis in the shipbuilding industry has had a deleterious effect on these second-tier enterprises.

=== Economic transformation ===
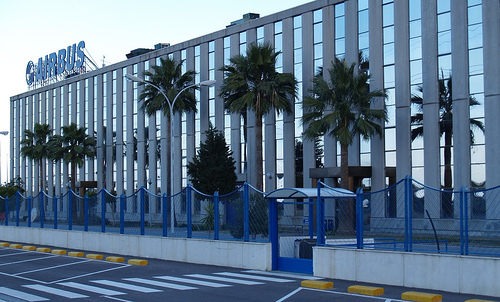
Airbus airplanes parts factory.

Due to the decline in shipbuilding, Puerto Real has already lost an important part of its industrial base, and the economy of the entire Bay of Cádiz area has suffered. This has resulted in a dramatic shift in the regional economic model, away from a dependence on heavy industry, toward an emphasis on tourism. However, Puerto Real, an industrial community headed toward obsolescence, is not as well-positioned to trade on sunshine and beach sand as some of its neighbors. The transition to a tourism-based economy has proved to be slow and painful. Puerto Real persists in having a high birth-rate, and the age of its average citizen continues to decline. Young people lacking jobs are forced to seek work elsewhere in Spain or even leave the country altogether.

Lacking fine beaches, Puerto Real has turned its attention inland. For that reason, the city's efforts at tourism-promotion mainly emphasize "rural tourism" activities, like golf, horseback-riding, walking, hiking, bicycling, and nature sightseeing. The local countryside has become a prime asset, and now Puerto Real builds hiking paths and golf courses rather than ocean-going tankers. The situation is much the same in other communities of the Bay of Cádiz area, like San Fernando, El Puerto de Santa Maria, and Cádiz itself.

== Politics ==
Since the time of the transition from dictatorship under Francisco Franco to democracy and a constitutional monarchy form of government (1975–1980), Puerto Real has remained to the left of the political spectrum. Leftist parties, sometimes in coalition with centrists, have dominated the local and provincial organs of democracy.

The anarcho-syndicalist union C.N.T. has helped to create mass assemblies after a dispute between shipyard workers and their bosses. Since then, the assemblies have focused on the issues such as health, taxes, economic issues, the environment and cultural preservation. This method has been praised as a method of anarchist community organising.

== Main sights ==
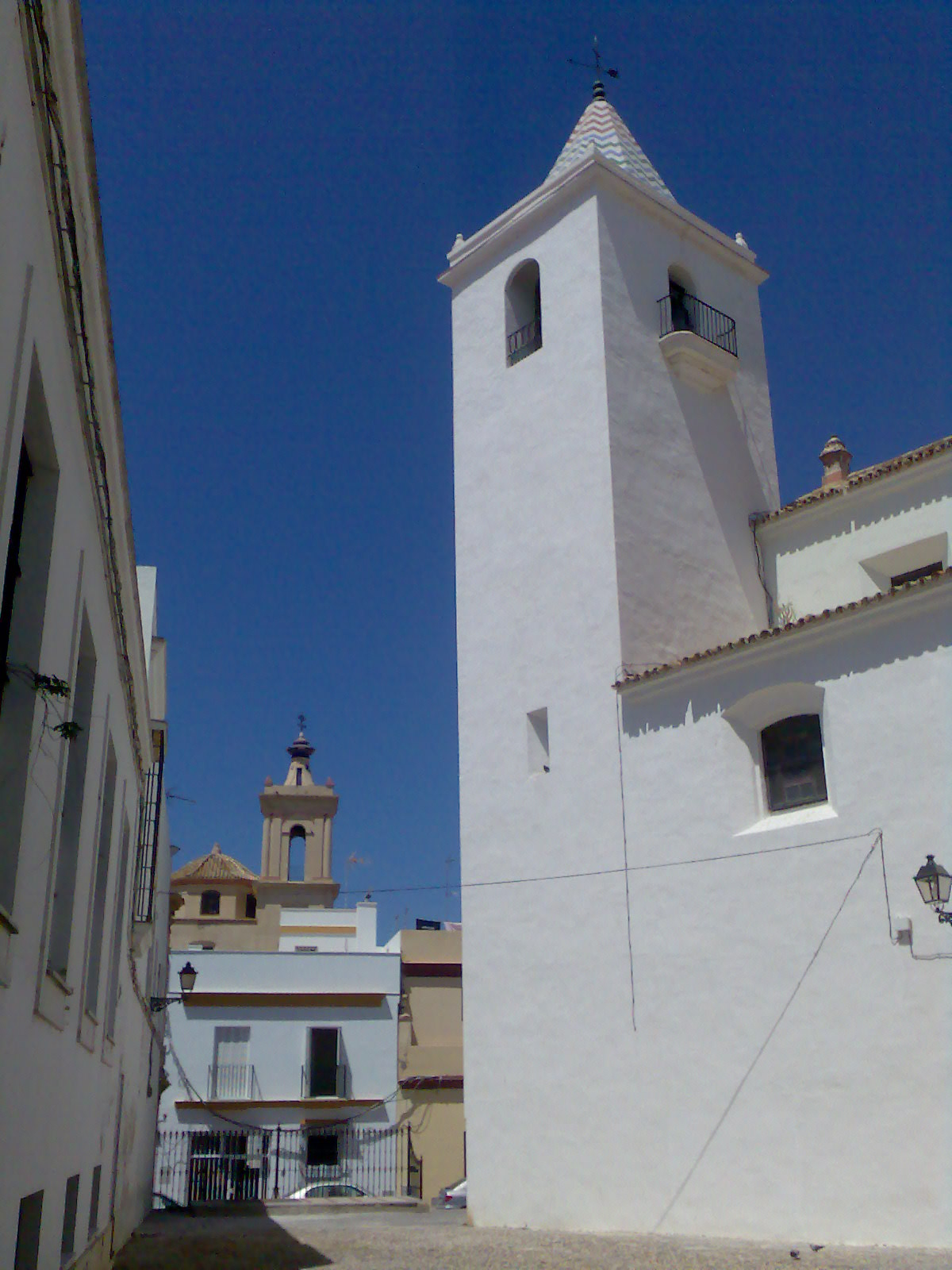
Saint Sebastian Parish Church

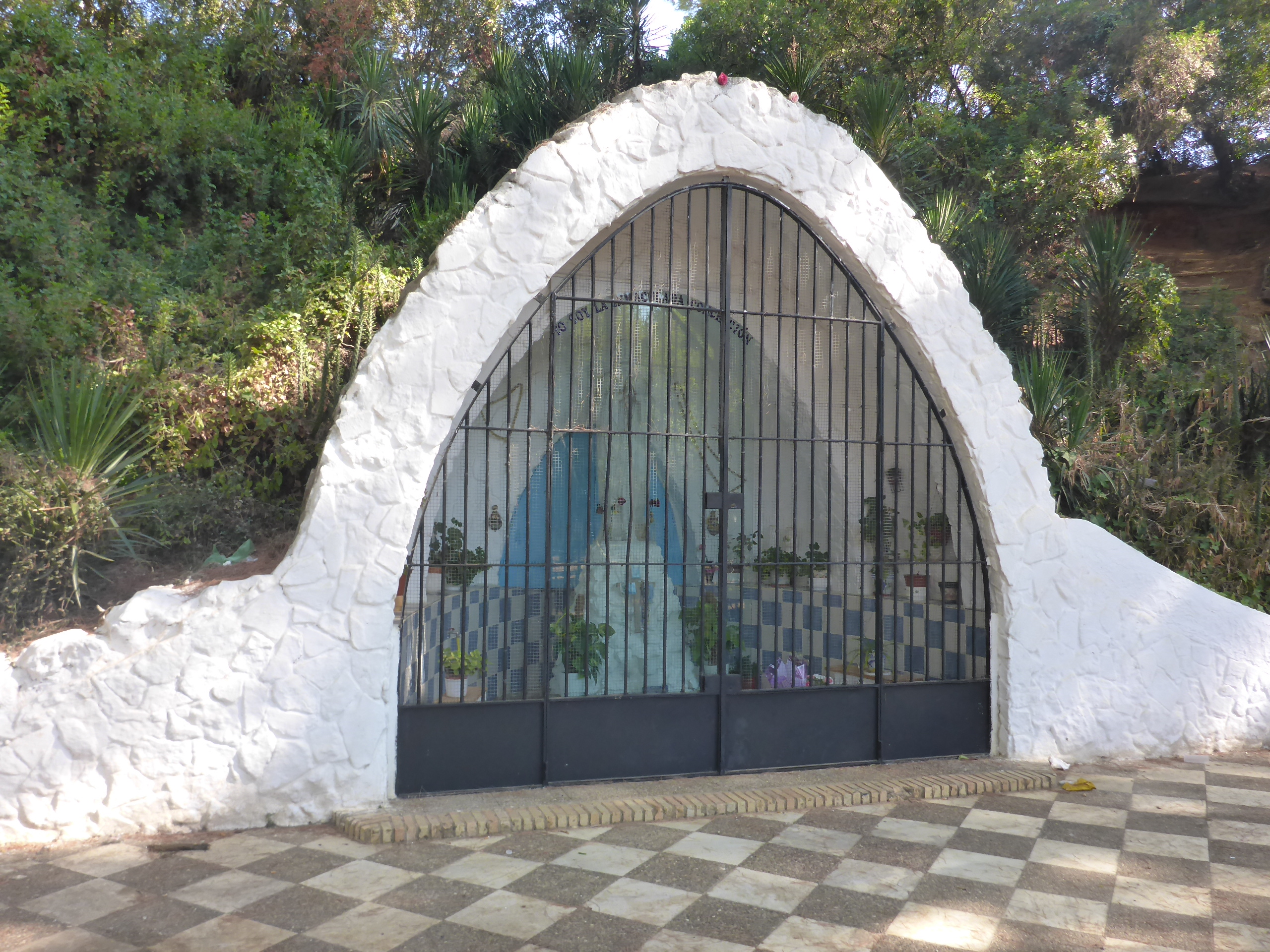
The Grotto of Our Lady of Lourdes at the Quarries (Las Canteras) Natural Park

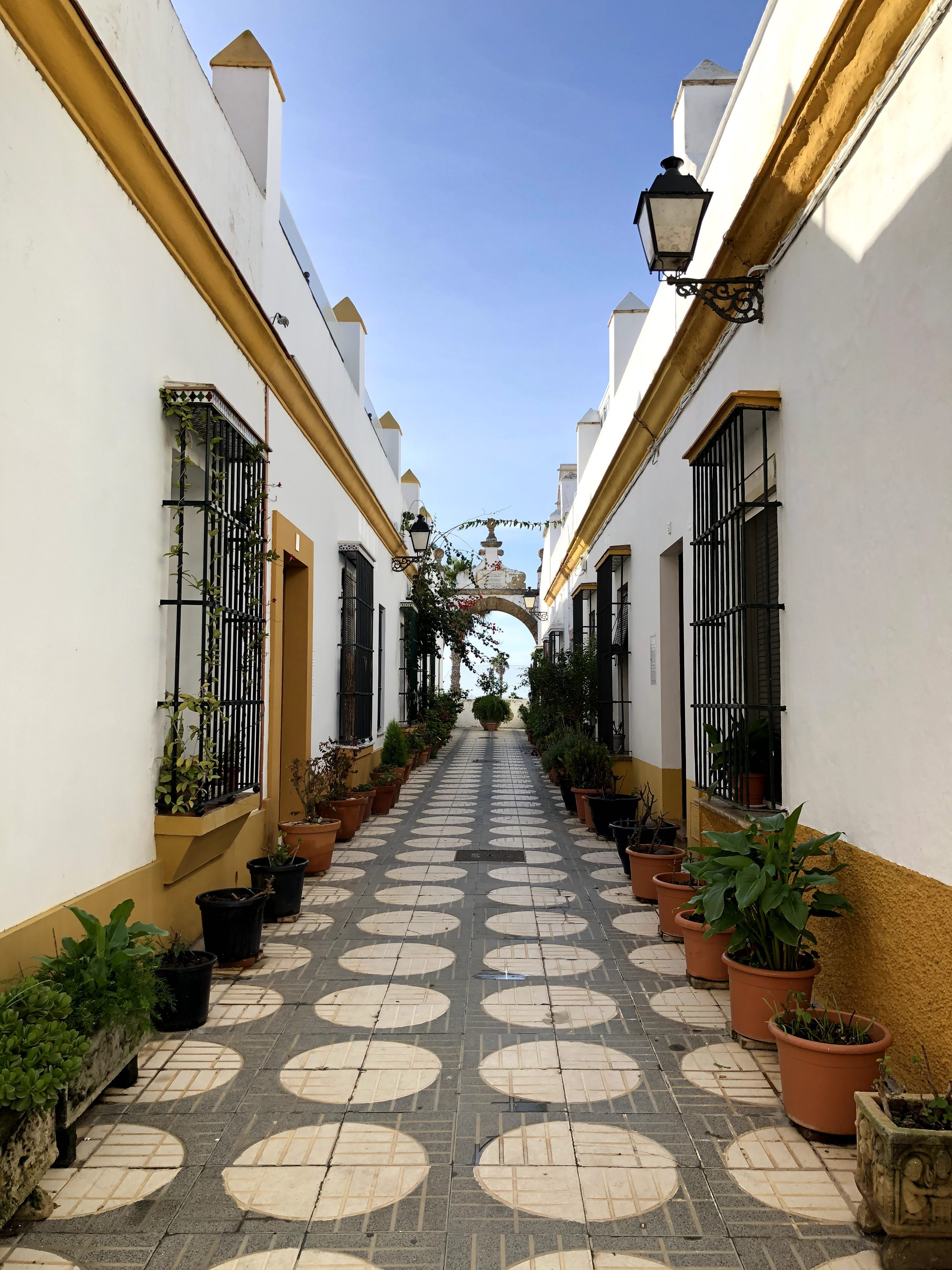
The iconic old street of the arch

- Natural Park of the Quarries (Las Canteras): the only place in Europe where chameleons may be easily found
- The Grotto of Our Lady of Lourdes at the Quarries (Las Canteras) Natural Park
- Forest of the Quarries (Las Canteras)
- Saint Sebastian Church (16th-18th century, gothic, renaissance, baroque)
- Victory's Church (17th century, baroque)
- Saint Joseph Church (18th century, neoclassic)
- Municipal Market (18th century)
- La Algaida
- The harborside walking tour with its "finishing nail of the wharf"
- The Trocadero (an old military settlement from the 18th century that gives name to the Parisian square, after a battle won by the French during the Napoleonic invasion of Spain)
- The river San Pedro's unique landscape surrounded by pine groves

== Culture ==
The social life of the city is based on neighborhood associations, religious organizations, and other social clubs. The yearly pre-Lenten carnival is a year-round preoccupation.

== People ==
- Juan Antonio Campuzano Hoyos, writer, captain of artillery, Alcalde de la Real Villa y Vicepresidente de la Diputación de Cádiz.
- Eduardo Alvarez Alfaro, musician, letrista, and composer
- Pedro Alvarez Hidalgo, composer and musician
- Francisco Corral Boat, politician
- Juan Jose Bottaro and Palmer, sculptor
- Canalejas of Puerto Real, flamenco singer
- Daily, comparsista performer
- Francisco Fernández Rodríguez, "Gallego", soccer player
- José Gámez Boundary, priest and writer
- Juan García, "Mondeño", bullfighter
- Ernesto Lopez, "Claudius Frollo", writer
- Pedro de Matheu Montalvo, painter
- Antonio Muro, historian ("father" of local history; adoptive son of the city)
- José Belizón Tocino, painter
- Diego Vargas, "the Fillo", flamenco singer
- José Antonio Chanivet, artist and painter
- Pepin De La Fuente, artist and painter
- Alex de la Croix, filmmaker, actor, and model.

== See also ==
- Costa de la Luz
- Puerto Real CF
- Pylons of Cádiz
- List of municipalities in Cádiz
