= 2019–20 WBL season =

Women's Basketball League
- Season: 2019–20
- Dates: September 2019 – March 2020
- Teams: 8 ▲ +1

Finals
- Champions: No champions

The 2019–20 WBL season was the 70th season of the Women's Basketball League (WBL), the Dutch top tier for women's basketball teams.

The season was ended prematurely in March 2020 due to the COVID-19 pandemic.

== Teams ==
Utrecht Cangeroes promoted to the league as winners of the 2018–19 Promotiedivise, and played its first-ever VBL season.

=== Arenas and locations ===
Location of teams in the 2019–20 VBL season

Note: Table lists in alphabetical order.

Club	Location	Venue	Capacity
Batouwe	Bemmel	De Schaapskooi	650
Binnenland	Barendrecht	De Driesprong	300
Utrecht Cangeroes	Utrecht	Sporthal Lunetten	100
Den Helder	Den Helder	Sporthal Sportlaan	1,000
Grasshoppers	Katwijk	Cleijn Duijn	450
Jolly Jumpers	Tubbergen	De Vlaskoel	
Landslake Lions	Landsmeer	ICL Sportcenter	900
Martini Sparks	Haren	Scharlakenhof	

=== Sponsored club names ===
As is common practice in European basketball, the following clubs carried the name of their sponsor this season:

Club	Sponsored name
Batouwe	Lekdetec.nl
Binnenland	4Consult/CBV Binnenland
Den Helder	Dozy BV Den Helder
Grasshoppers	Sportiff Company Grasshoppers
Landslake Lions	Loon Lions
Martini Sparks	Keijser Capital Martini Sparks

== Regular season ==
=== League table ===
Pos	Team	Pld	W	L	PF	PA	PD	Pts	Qualification
1	Grasshoppers	26	23	3	1999	1584	+415	46	Advance to play-offs
2	Binnenland	26	20	6	1906	1553	+353	40	Advance to play-offs
3	Landslake Lions	26	17	9	1795	1581	+214	34	Advance to play-offs
4	Den Helder	24	13	11	1614	1523	+91	26	Advance to play-offs
5	Batouwe	26	12	14	1681	1744	−63	24	
6	Jolly Jumpers	24	11	13	1484	1590	−106	22	
7	Martini Sparks	25	3	22	1440	1761	−321	6	
8	Utrecht Cangeroes	25	2	23	1339	1922	−583	4	

Source: Eurobasket.com

== Statistical leaders ==
Statistic	Player	Team	Average
Points per game	(Netherlands) Marlou de Kleijn	Binnenland	20.2
Rebounds per game	(Netherlands) Britt Zapeij	Den Helder	8.7
Assists per game	(Netherlands) Karin Kuijt	Grasshoppers	4.7
