= 2024–25 Dutch Women's Basketball League =

Women's basketball league in Netherlands

Dutch Women's Basketball League
- Season: 2024–25
- Dates: Regular season: 21 September 2024 – 5 April 2025; Play Offs: 12 April – 28 May 2025

Regular season
- Season MVP: (Netherlands) Lotte Van Kruistum

Finals
- Champions: GBI van Dijk Grasshoppers (5th title)
- Runners-up: TopKip Lions
- Finals MVP: (Netherlands) Lotte Van Kruistum

Statistical leaders
Points	(Netherlands) Richelle Van Der Keijl	18.6
Rebounds	(Netherlands) Lotte Toornstra	10.6
Assists	(Netherlands) Karin Kuijt	5.9
Steals	(Netherlands) Anke Rikhof	2.8
Blocks	(Netherlands) Lisanne De Jonge	1.8

The 2024–25 Dutch Women's Basketball League is the 76th season of the top division women's basketball league in Netherlands since its establishment in 1949. It starts in September 2024 with the first round of the regular season and ends in May 2025.

GBI van Dijk Grasshoppers are the defending champions.

GBI van Dijk Grasshoppers won their fifth title after beating TopKip Lions in the final.

== Format ==
Each team plays each other three times. The top two teams qualify for the semifinals while clubs ranked third to sixth progress to the quarterfinals. The quarterfinals are played as a best of three series while the semifinals and final is played as a best of five series.

== Regular season ==
Pos	Team	Pld	W	L	PF	PA	PD	Pts	Qualification
1	GBI van Dijk Grasshoppers	27	26	1	2384	1468	+916	53	Semifinals
2	Triple Threat	27	22	5	2066	1620	+446	49	Semifinals
3	TopKip Lions	27	21	6	2253	1665	+588	48	Quarterfinals
4	Jolly Jumpers	27	19	8	2052	1651	+401	46	Quarterfinals
5	Den Helder Suns	27	12	15	1717	1735	−18	39	Quarterfinals
6	Startportaal-Renza Airflow Binnenland	27	10	17	1500	1796	−296	37 (Note: Startportaal-Renza Airflow Binnenland 2–1 QSTA United)	Quarterfinals
7	QSTA United	27	10	17	1682	1973	−291	37	
8	AT-Automation BAL	27	9	18	1641	1924	−283	36	
9	ZZ Leiden	27	6	21	1594	2036	−442	33	
10	Comfective Hammers	27	0	27	1346	2367	−1021	27	Relegation

Source: Women's Basketball League
Rules for classification: 1) Points; 2) Points difference; 3) Points scored.

== Play offs ==
Quarterfinals
4	Jolly Jumpers	75	56	2
5	Den Helder Suns	66	54	0
3	TopKip Lions	80	82	2
6	Startportaal-Renza Airflow Binnenland	51	71	0

Semifinals
1	GBI van Dijk Grasshoppers	89	69	1
4	Jolly Jumpers	57	74	1
2	Triple Threat	61	81	0
3	TopKip Lions	79	82	2

Final
1	GBI van Dijk Grasshoppers	77	91	72	70	3
3	TopKip Lions	80	52	67	58	1

Champions of Netherlands

GBI van Dijk Grasshoppers
Fifth title
