= Mike Sylvester =

American basketball player (born 1951)

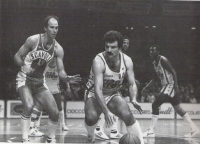

Personal information
- Born: December 10, 1951 (age 74) Cincinnati, Ohio, U.S.
- Listed height: 6 ft 5.5 in (1.97 m)
- Listed weight: 218 lb (99 kg)

Career information
- High school: Moeller (Cincinnati, Ohio)
- College: Dayton
- NBA draft: 1974: 6th round, 105th overall pick
- Drafted by: Detroit Pistons
- Playing career: 1974–1991
- Position: Shooting guard / small forward
- Number: 6, 15
- Coaching career: 1992–2009

Career history

Playing
- 1974–1980: Olimpia Milano
- 1980–1986: VL Pesaro
- 1986–1987: Basket Rimini
- 1987–1990: Virtus Bologna
- 1990–1991: Basket Marsala

Coaching
- 1992: Dayton Wings
- 2009: Cincinnati Hills Christian Academy

Career highlights
- As a player: 3× FIBA European Cup Winners Cup champion (1976, 1983, 1990); 3× Italian Cup winner (1985, 1989, 1990); As a head coach: World Basketball League champion (1992)
- Stats at Basketball Reference
Medals
Men's basketball
Representing Italy
Olympic Games
Silver medal – second place	1980 Moscow

Michael Joseph Sylvester (born December 10, 1951) is an American and Italian former professional baseball player, professional basketball player, and basketball coach. During his basketball playing career, at a height of 1.97 m (6 ft 5 1/2 in), he was known as an accurate shooter. Due to the United States boycotting the 1980 Summer Olympics, he was the only American to win a medal at those games, using a dual citizenship to play for the senior Italian national basketball team.

== Early life and career ==
Sylvester was born December 10, 1951, in Cincinnati, Ohio. He graduated from Moeller High School, where he competed in the sports of baseball and basketball, with All-American honors. After high school he played college basketball at the University of Dayton, with the Dayton Fyers.

== College basketball career ==
Sylvester's college basketball career highlight with the Dayton Flyers, happened at the 1974 NCAA championship, in a game in which he scored 36 points, in a match where the Flyers forced three overtimes, and nearly upset Bill Walton's UCLA Bruins.

== Professional basketball career ==
Following his college basketball career, Sylvester declared for both the NBA draft and the American Basketball Association draft. He was chosen in the sixth round, with the 105th pick overall, by the Detroit Pistons, in the 1974 NBA draft. He was also chosen with the tenth pick, by the Carolina Cougars, in the ABA draft. After those drafts, Cesare Rubini, the head coach of Italian League team Olimpia Milano, invited him to play for the team in the European-wide 3rd-tier level 1974–75 FIBA Korać Cup competition.

The President of Olimpia Milano at that time, had directed Rubini to seek-out American basketball players of Italian descent, who wished to become naturalized citizens of Italy, and to play for Italy's senior national team. Sylvester qualified, due to one his grandfathers being an Italian immigrant. Sylvester (known in Italy by the spelling of "Silvester"), ended up signing with Milano. Sylvester was a major part of the Milano team that won the European-wide 2nd-tier level 1975–76 FIBA European Cup Winners' Cup championship. Milano's victorious years with Sylvester would end in 1980, as after he had a heated argument with teammate C. J. Kupec, the team's head coach Dan Peterson, would request that Sylvester leave the team. Sylvester would eventually be transferred to the Italian club VL Pesaro, for a then-Italian basketball league record transfer fee of $500,000 US Dollars.

Sylvester spent six seasons with the Italian club Scavolini Pesaro. He helped lead Pesaro to achieve two Italian League Runner-Up finishes, in the 1981–82 and 1984–85 seasons, the 1982–83 FIBA Saporta Cup title, the 1983–84 FIBA Saporta Cup Semifinals, the 1985 Coppa Italia (Italian Cup) title, and the 1985–86 FIBA Saporta Cup Finals.

Sylvester's Italian league basketball career, also included playing stints with Basket Rimini and Virtus Bologna, and Basket Marsala.

== National team basketball career ==
Sylvester was naturalized as Italian citizen in 1977. Three years later, he would be called on to represent the senior Italy national basketball team, and he had a great performance at the 1980 FIBA European Olympic Qualifying Tournament, that gave the Italians a spot at the 1980 Moscow Summer Olympic Games. However, as soon as Sylvester heard the United States was leading the 1980 Summer Olympics boycott, Sylvester wondered if he needed to adhere, particularly as an Italian player, refusing an Olympic invitation could potentially cause a ban from playing professionally.

He contacted the U.S. State Department, who advised Sylvester to play. He still abstained from a vote within the Italian team about the boycott, saying he would follow the squad's decision – the Italians eventually played, though under the Olympic flag. Despite suffering a sprained ankle during the 1980 Summer Olympics Basketball Tournament, he won a silver medal, after the Italians upset the Soviet Union, before eventually losing in the Olympic final to Yugoslavia. Sylvester was the only American to win a medal at those games.

Sylvester also competed with Italy at the 1981 FIBA EuroBasket.

== Basketball coaching career ==
After his playing career ended, Sylvester became a basketball coach. He was the head coach of the Dayton Wings, which he led to the World Basketball League championship in 1992. Sylvester also worked as the head coach of Cincinnati Hills Christian Academy high school.

== Baseball career ==
Sylvester also played the sport of baseball in his youth. He was selected in the 1970 MLB draft, by the Major League Baseball team the Chicago Cubs, in the 12th round of the draft, with the 282nd overall draft pick.

Sylvester competed in the professional Italian Serie A Baseball League, in the summer of 1978, when he played with Diavia Bollate. As a pitcher, in 11 games played, Sylvester had a total of 66 innings pitched, with a 3.55 earned run average (ERA). At the plate, he made batting appearances in 13 games played. In 29 total at bats, he recorded a batting average of .269.

== Personal life ==
Sylvester is a current resident of Loveland, Ohio. The Sylvester family has a sports tradition. Mike's brothers, Steve and Vince, were American football players, with the former reaching the NFL and playing for the Oakland Raiders, and the latter being a college star at the University of Cincinnati. Mike's son Matt was also a basketball player, and he played in college for Ohio State, before going to Europe to play professionally like his father.
