= Arubans in the Netherlands =

Arubans in the Netherlands Arubanen in Nederland
Total population
- 32,884 (2023)

Languages
- Dutch, Papiamento

Religion
- Christianity

Arubans in the Netherlands (Dutch: Arubanen in Nederland) are migrants from Aruba to the Netherlands and their descendants. In 1986, Aruba seceded from the Netherlands Antilles and became a constituent country within the Kingdom of the Netherlands. As of 2023, figures from Statistics Netherlands showed 32,884 people of Aruban origin in the Netherlands. Rotterdam has the largest Aruban community with around 4,000 people of Aruban descent. Large Aruban communities can also be found in Amsterdam, Tilburg, Almere and The Hague.

== Notable people ==
- Emily Bolton, actress
- Gregor Breinburg, football player
- Alain Clark, singer
- Denzel Dumfries, football player
- Caroline van der Leeuw, singer
- Greg Halman, baseball player
- Naomi Halman, basketball player
- Percy Irausquin, fashion designer
- Dwayne Kemp, baseball player
- Hedwiges Maduro, football player
- Eugène Martineau, decathlete
- Pete Philly, rapper
- Danny Rombley, baseball player
- Edsilia Rombley, singer
- James Sharpe, politician
- Jonathan Richard, football player
- Smiley, singer
- Demy de Zeeuw, football player
