= 2020–21 Yoast United season =

Yoast United
2020–21 season
- Head coach: Matthew Otten
- Arena: De Schaapskooi
- Dutch Basketball League: Quarterfinalist (lost to Heroes Den Bosch)
- Basketball Cup: Runner-up (lost to BAL Weert)
- All statistics correct as of 10 February 2020.

The 2020–21 Yoast United season was the first season in the existence of the club. The club plays in the Dutch Basketball League (DBL) and DBL Cup. Led by head coach Matthew Otten, the team immediately reached the Final of the 2021 DBL Cup, in which the team lost to BAL Weert. In the playoffs, Yoast was eliminated in the quarterfinals by Heroes Den Bosch.

Austin Luke was one of United's important players, he led the DBL in assists. Bob Berghuis was named to the DBL All-Rookie Team.

== Roster ==
Yoast United roster
Players
Coaches

Pos.	No.	Nat.	Name	Ht.	Age
F	0	(Netherlands)	Jaro Abrams (DP)	1.90 m (6 ft 3 in)	22 – 20 March 2002
PG	1	(United States)	Austin Luke	1.91 m (6 ft 3 in)	30 – 27 October 1994
PG	2	(Netherlands)	Yaëll dos Santos Borges	1.88 m (6 ft 2 in)	23 – 25 March 2001
G	5	(Netherlands)	Bob Berghuis	1.88 m (6 ft 2 in)	23 – 24 August 2001
F	8	(Netherlands)	Matthew van Tongeren	2.01 m (6 ft 7 in)	32 – 31 January 1993
SF	9	(Netherlands)	Jurrian Douwes (DP)	2.00 m (6 ft 7 in)	22 – 11 July 2002
SF	10	(Netherlands)	Keime Helfrich	1.97 m (6 ft 6 in)	27 – 5 September 1997
C	12	(Netherlands)	Jesse Markusse	2.06 m (6 ft 9 in)	32 – 27 May 1992
SG	13	(United States)	Kaleb Warner	1.98 m (6 ft 6 in)	29 – 6 July 1995
F	14	(Netherlands)	Robin Simonis	1.94 m (6 ft 4 in)	28 – 26 September 1996
C	20	(Colombia)	Andres Ibarguen	1.96 m (6 ft 5 in)	29 – 14 February 1996
PF	33	(United States)	Jett Speelman	2.01 m (6 ft 7 in)	30 – 8 July 1994

Head coach

- (United States) Matthew Otten

Assistant coach(es)

- (Netherlands) Vincent van Sliedregt

Legend

- (C) Team captain
- (DP) Development player
- Injured

- Roster
Updated: 3 October 2020

Note: Flags indicate national team eligibility at FIBA-sanctioned events. Players may hold other non-FIBA nationalities not displayed.

== Transactions ==
=== In ===
No.	Pos.	Nat.	Name	Age	Moving from		Type	Ends	Date	Source
13	SG	(United States)	Kaleb Warner	25	Dreamfield Dolphins	(Netherlands)	Free	Undisclosed	13 August 2020	
5	PG	(Netherlands)	Bob Berghuis	19	Orange Lions Academy	(Netherlands)	Free	Undisclosed	15 August 2020	
1	PG	(United States)	Austin Luke	25	Melilla	(Spain)	Free	Undisclosed	17 August 2020	
33	F	(Netherlands)	Jett Speelman	26	Amicale Steesel	(Luxembourg)	Free	Undisclosed	19 August 2020	
10	SG	(Netherlands)	Keime Helfrich	22	Dreamfield Dolphins	(Netherlands)	Free	Undisclosed	21 August 2020	
20	C	(Colombia)	Andres Ibarguen	24	Angelo State	(United States)	Free	Undisclosed	28 August 2020	
8	PF	(Netherlands)	Matthew van Tongeren	27	Apollo Amsterdam	(Netherlands)	Free	Undisclosed	5 September 2020	
14	F	(Netherlands)	Robin Simonis	23	Dreamfield Dolphins	(Netherlands)	Free	Undisclosed	8 September 2020	
12	C	(Netherlands)	Jesse Markusse	28	Apollo Amsterdam	(Netherlands)	Free	Undisclosed	11 September 2020	
9	F	(Netherlands)	Jurrian Douwes	18	TBG Dragons Youth	(Netherlands)	Free	Undisclosed	24 September 2020	
2	PG	(Netherlands)	Yaëll dos Santos Borges	19	ZZ Leiden	(Netherlands)	Free	Undisclosed	24 September 2020	
0	F	(Netherlands)	Jaro Abrams	18	Orange Lions Academy	(Netherlands)	Free	Undisclosed	24 September 2020	
11	G/F	(Netherlands)	Shane Hammink	26	Donar	(Netherlands)	Free	Undisclosed	2 October 2020	
