= Tywanna Smith =

American sports executive, author and former professional basketball player

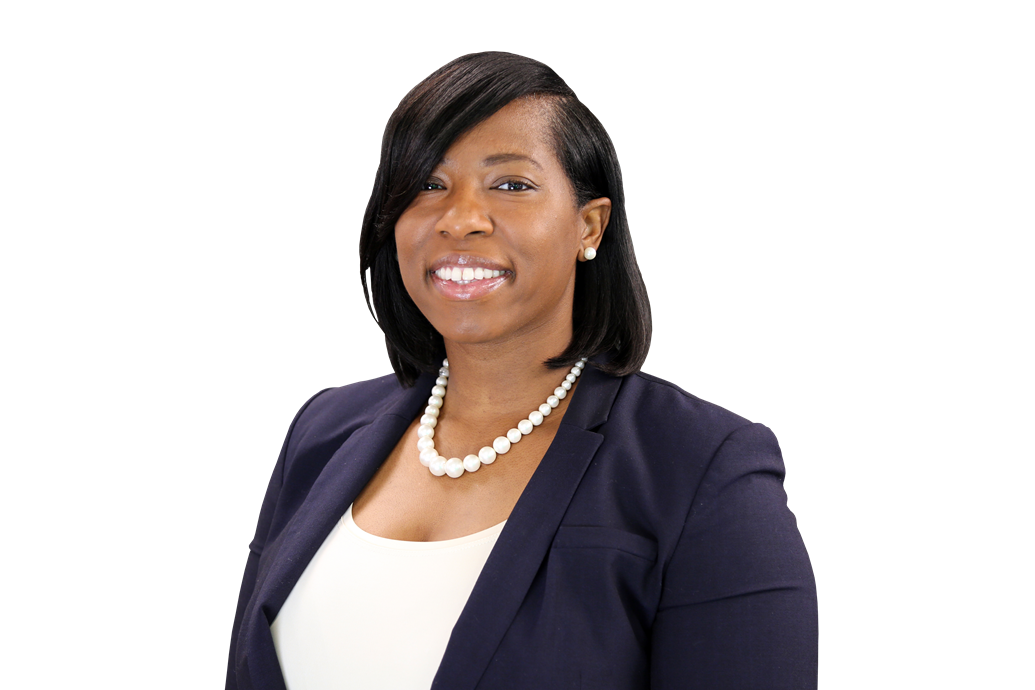

Personal information
- Born: August 17, 1982 (age 44)
- Listed height: 6 ft 0 in (1.83 m)

Career information
- High school: West Memphis (West Memphis, Arkansas)
- College: Ole Miss (2000–2004)
- Position: Forward
- Number: 34

Career history
- 2005–06: Amazone
- 2006–07: Pabellon-Ourense

Career highlights
- Dutch All-Star game (2006)

Tywanna Smith (born August 17, 1982), née Tywanna Inmon, is a sports executive, author and former professional basketball player. She is the author of Surviving the Lights: A Professional Athlete's Playbook to Avoiding the Curse.

== Playing career ==
=== Ole Miss, 2000–2004 ===
Tywanna Smith played college basketball for Ole Miss as a starter for four years. She was selected to be captain of the team in the 2003–04 season, her senior year. At the postseason team banquet, she was presented with award for the highest grade point average. Her academic achievements earned her a spot on the 2003 SEC Winter Academic Honor Roll.

On March 4, 2004, in an SEC Tournament game against Alabama, she pulled down 13 rebounds, which is tied for the third best number of rebounds in an SEC Tournament game.

=== Mississippi statistics ===
Legend
GP	Games played	GS	Games started	MPG	Minutes per game
FG%	Field goal percentage	3P%	3-point field goal percentage	FT%	Free throw percentage
RPG	Rebounds per game	APG	Assists per game	SPG	Steals per game
BPG	Blocks per game	PPG	Points per game	**Bold**	Career high

Year	Team	GP	Points	FG%	3P%	FT%	RPG	APG	SPG	BPG	PPG
2000–01	Mississippi	29	**275**	42.7%	33.3%	70.1%	**5.4**	0.4	1.0	**0.2**	**9.5**
2001–02	Mississippi	22	130	37.6%	33.3%	60.0%	4.8	**1.0**	0.9	0.0	5.9
2002–03	Mississippi	21	103	40.0%	21.4%	**75.0%**	3.7	0.8	0.8	0.1	4.9
2003–04	Mississippi	**30**	227	**48.3%**	**40.9%**	68.6%	4.3	0.9	**1.3**	0.1	7.6
Career		102	735	42.7%	33.3%	68.2%	4.6	0.8	1.0	0.1	7.2

=== Professional ===
From her college career at the University of Mississippi, Smith moved overseas to play basketball professionally in Europe. She played for the Dutch team Amazone from 2005 to 2006 and the Spanish team Pabellon-Ourense from 2006 to 2007. Smith also made the Dutch FEB All-Star Gala in 2006.

== After basketball ==
Smith gives advice to sports players regarding finances, branding, and business. In 2016, she launched The Athlete's Nexus, a sports marketing and business management business for international professional athletes, including those in the NBA and NFL.
