= 1984–85 FIBA European Cup Winners' Cup =

- League: FIBA European Cup Winners' Cup
- Sport: Basketball

Finals
- Champions: (Spain) FC Barcelona
- Runners-up: (Soviet Union) Žalgiris

FIBA European Cup Winners' Cup seasons
- ← 1983–84 1985–86 →

The 1984–85 FIBA European Cup Winners' Cup was the nineteenth edition of FIBA's 2nd-tier level European-wide professional club basketball competition, contested between national domestic cup champions, running from 2 October 1984, to 19 March 1985. It was contested by 20 teams, four less than in the previous edition.

FC Barcelona, runner-up in the 1983–84 edition of the Spanish Cup, was assigned the berth of the previous year's winner, Real Madrid, who would participate in that season's FIBA European Champions Cup instead.

In the final, held in Grenoble, FC Barcelona defeated Žalgiris, to win their first European trophy. It was the second title in a row for a Spanish League team.

== Participants ==
Country	Teams	Clubs	
Spain	2	FC Barcelona	CAI Zaragoza
Austria	1	Landys&Gyr Wien	
Belgium	1	Maccabi Brussels	
Bulgaria	1	Spartak Pleven	
Cyprus	1	APOEL	
Czechoslovakia	1	Nová huť Ostrava	
Finland	1	KTP	
France	1	ASVEL	
Greece	1	PAOK	
Hungary	1	Csepel	
Israel	1	Hapoel Tel Aviv	
Italy	1	Intesit Caserta	
Luxembourg	1	Etzella	
Netherlands	1	Hatrans Haaksbergen	
Scotland	1	Falkirk	
Soviet Union	1	Žalgiris	
Sweden	1	Alvik	
Turkey	1	Karşıyaka	
(Socialist Federal Republic of Yugoslavia) Yugoslavia	1	Bosna	

== First round ==
Team 1	Agg.	Team 2	1st leg	2nd leg
APOEL (Cyprus)	114–243	(Austria) Landys&Gyr Wien	58–104	56–139
Csepel (Hungary)	154–215	(Greece) PAOK	73–99	81–116
Karşıyaka (Turkey)	147–167	(Bulgaria) Spartak Pleven	72–58	75–109
Falkirk (Scotland)	159–170	(Netherlands) Permalens Haaksbergen	71–82	88–88
Maccabi Brussels (Belgium)	148–167	(France) ASVEL	75–82	73–85
Alvik (Sweden)	176–170	(Finland) KTP	97–86	79–84

== Second round ==
Team 1	Agg.	Team 2	1st leg	2nd leg
Landys&Gyr Wien (Austria)	187–186	(Czechoslovakia) Nová huť Ostrava	94–68	93–118
PAOK (Greece)	170–168	(Socialist Federal Republic of Yugoslavia) Bosna	88–84	82–84
Spartak Pleven (Bulgaria)	168–239	(Soviet Union) Žalgiris	89–108	79–131
Permalens Haaksbergen (Netherlands)	178–211	(Israel) Hapoel Tel Aviv	94–99	84–112
ASVEL (France)	165–154	(Sweden) Alvik	91–77	74–77
Etzella (Luxembourg)	108–243	(Spain) FC Barcelona	55–138	53–105

Automatically qualified to the Quarter finals group stage

- (Italy) Intesit Caserta
- (Spain) CAI Zaragoza

== Quarterfinals ==
Key to colors
Top two places in each group advance to semifinals

=== Group A ===
	(Soviet Union) ŽAL	(Spain) ZAR	(Austria) LGW	(Greece) PAOK
(Soviet Union) ŽAL		95-90	139-115	102-96
(Spain) ZAR	65-89		97-93	80-76
(Austria) LGW	99-116	100-102		86-84
(Greece) PAOK	72-78	86-89	93-96	

	Team	Pld	Pts	W	L	PF	PA	PD
1.	(Soviet Union) Žalgiris	6	12	6	0	619	537	+82
2.	(Spain) CAI Zaragoza	6	10	4	2	523	539	-16
3.	(Austria) Landys&Gyr Wien	6	8	2	4	589	631	-42
4.	(Greece) PAOK	6	6	0	6	507	531	-24

=== Group B ===
	(Spain) FCB	(France) ASV	(Italy) CAS	(Israel) HTA
(Spain) FCB		96-86	95-94	73-63
(France) ASV	94-86		93-79	95-82
(Italy) CAS	73-92	80-74		108-89
(Israel) HTA	96-101	79-83	98-95	

	Team	Pld	Pts	W	L	PF	PA	PD
1.	(Spain) FC Barcelona	6	11	5	1	543	506	+37
2.	(France) ASVEL	6	10	4	2	525	502	+23
3.	(Italy) Intesit Caserta	6	8	2	4	529	541	-12
4.	(Israel) Hapoel Tel Aviv	6	7	1	5	507	555	-48

== Semifinals ==
Team 1	Agg.	Team 2	1st leg	2nd leg
Žalgiris (Soviet Union)	172–171	(France) ASVEL	84-78	88–93
CAI Zaragoza (Spain)	163–165	(Spain) FC Barcelona	84–79	79-86

== Final ==
March 19, Palais des Sports, Grenoble

Team 1	Score	Team 2
FC Barcelona (Spain)	77–73	(Soviet Union) Žalgiris

1984–85 FIBA European Cup Winners' Cup Champions

FC Barcelona
1st title
