= Blue Stars (basketball club) =

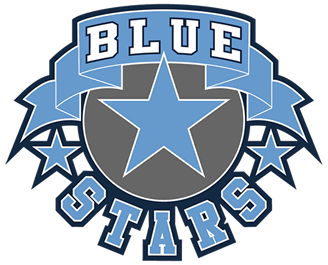
- Founded: 1947; 78 years ago
- Arena: Sporthal Diemen
- Capacity: 500
- Location: Diemen and IJburg, Netherlands
- Team colors: White, Light Blue
- Championships: 2 Dutch League; 1 Dutch Cup
- Website: Official website
Home	Away

Blue Stars is a Dutch basketball club based in Diemen and IJburg, North Holland. The club played in the top tier Eredivisie during the 60s, 70s and 80s.

== History ==
Blue Stars Basketball was founded in 1947 by Jan Janbroers and is one of the oldest basketball clubs in the Netherlands. The men's team was in 1960 one of the founders of the Premier League and has won several national titles and national cups. Between 1970 and 1973, Blue Stars sponsored by Fiat and they were called temporarily "Fiat Stars". Hereafter called the team between 1973 and 1976 "Gerard Long Blue Stars". After the termination of this sponsorship agreement, the Blue Stars stopped in the premier league.

Doing since the fifties Blue Stars along at the top of the women's league. With twenty championships Blue Stars, the club with the most league titles in the history of the Dutch women's basketball. In the seventies, the Blue Stars ladies formed the basis of the Dutch team.

== Today ==
At present Blue Stars has no more teams at the highest level. In 2007, they had only 27 members and stood Blue Stars for choosing whether or not to proceed with the association. Blue Stars has then taken by a number of enthusiasts, the decision to go ahead and blow new life into the club. From that moment on Blue Stars started again with a youth section. Blue Stars Men 1 and 2 are in the Rayon. Other teams from the region classes of Amsterdam region. Blue Stars has in the 2013–2014 season more than 130 members.

== Honours ==
(Men)

Dutch League

- Winners (2): 1958–59, 1969–70

Dutch Cup

- Winners (1): 1972-73

(Women)

Dutch League

- Winners (20): 1950–51, 1951–52, 1952–53, 1953–54, 1954–55, 1955–56, 1956–57, 1957–58, 1958–59, 1961–62, 1962–63, 1963–64, 1965–66, 1968–69, 1970–71, 1971–72, 1972–73, 1973–74, 1974–75, 1975-76

Dutch Cup

- Winners (15): 1950–51, 1953–54, 1954–55, 1955–56, 1956–57, 1957–58, 1962–63, 1967–68, 1968–69, 1970–71, 1971–72, 1972–73, 1973–74, 1974–75, 1975–76

== Notable players ==
- (Netherlands) Jan Willem Jansen
- (Netherlands) Ton Boot
