= 2016–17 NBB Cup =

NBB Cup
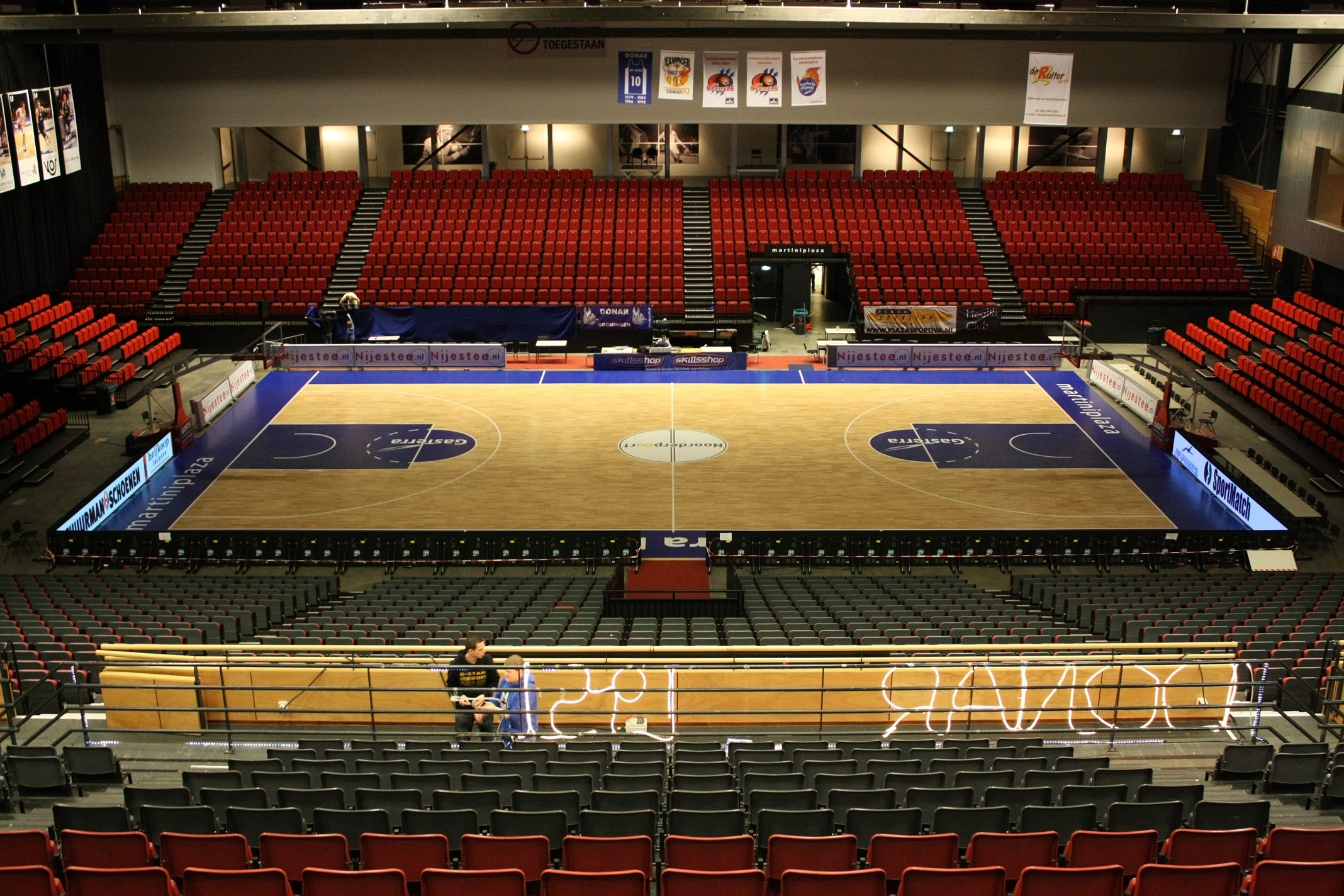
- MartiniPlaza hosted the Cup Final
- Season: 2016–17
- Teams: 52

Finals
- Champions: Donar (5th title)
- Runners-up: Landstede

The 2016–17 NBB Cup (Dutch: 2016–17 NBB-Beker) was the 49th edition of the Netherlands' national basketball cup tournament. Donar won its fifth national cup title.

== Format ==
In the first, second and third round teams from the Dutch second, third and fourth division participate. From the fourth round, teams from the Dutch Basketball League (DBL) enter the competition. Quarter- and semi-finals are played in a two-legged format. When a team form a tier lower than the DBL played a DBL team, one win is sufficient for the latter to advance to the next round.

== Bracket ==
Fourth round 8 December–18 January
New Heroes	83
Donar	95
Landslake Lions	69
ZZ Leiden	89
De Groene Uilen	65
Apollo Amsterdam	95
Grasshoppers	69
Aris Leeuwarden	93
Virtus	76
Challenge Sports Rotterdam	100
EVBV Octopus	50
BSW	110
Red Giants Meppel	51
Landstede	85
Trajanum	62
BV Groningen	65

Quarterfinals; 11 January–7 February
Donar	80	69	149
ZZ Leiden	49	59	108
Apollo Amsterdam	89	98	187
Aris Leeuwarden	87	89	176
Challenge Sports Rotterdam	89	73	162
BSW	62	74	136
Landstede	81	81
BV Groningen	49	49

Semifinals; 22 February–8 March
Donar	93	92	185
Apollo Amsterdam	61	62	123
Challenge Sports Rotterdam	79	71	150
Landstede	83	72	155

Final; 26 March
Donar	78
Landstede	58

== Final ==
26 March 2017	Donar	78–58	Landstede	Groningen
14:00 GMT+1	Scoring by quarter: 15–20, 23–8, 13–15, 27–15
RTV Noord	Pts: Slagter, Jeter 16; Rebs: Fieler 11; Asts: Cunningham 7	Boxscore	Pts: Yoho 15; Rebs: Oudendag 14; Asts: Tiller 4	Arena: MartiniPlaza; Attendance: 4,350

Donar	Landstede
