= Natalie van den Adel =

Dutch basketball player (born 1990)

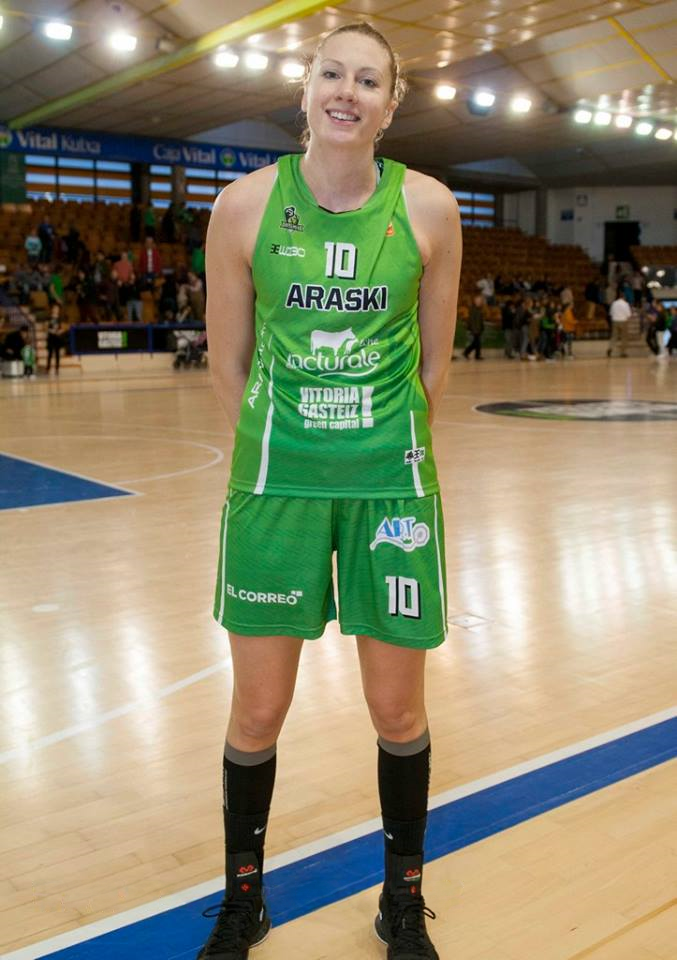
- 2017

No. 10 – Porta XI Ensino
- Position: Shooting guard / small forward
- League: Liga Femenina de Baloncesto

Personal information
- Born: 25 October 1990 (age 36) Dordrecht, Netherlands
- Listed height: 1.88 m (6 ft 2 in)

Career information
- College: Colorado State (2009–2010)
- Playing career: 2006–present

Career history
- 2006–2008: Binnenland
- 2010–2012: Binnenland
- 2012–2013: Grasshoppers
- 2013: Binnenland
- 2014: Angers
- 2014–2016: Zamarat
- 2016: McKinnon Cougars
- 2016–2017: Stadium Casablanca
- 2017–2020: Araski
- 2020–present: Porta XI Ensino
Medals
Women's 3x3 basketball
Representing the Netherlands
Europe Cup
Silver medal – second place	2018 Bucharest
Silver medal – second place	2022 Graz

Natalie van den Adel (born 25 October 1990) is a Dutch professional basketball player who plays for Porta XI Ensino of the Liga Femenina de Baloncesto. Standing at 1.88 m (6 ft 2 in), she plays shooting guard or small forward.

She competed in the 2013 European Championship qualifiers with statistics, averaging 6.9 points and 2.8 rebounds in eight games.

With the Dutch national 3x3 team, Van den Adel won the silver medal at the 3x3 Europe Cups of 2018 and 2022.
