= Luttelgeest =

- Village
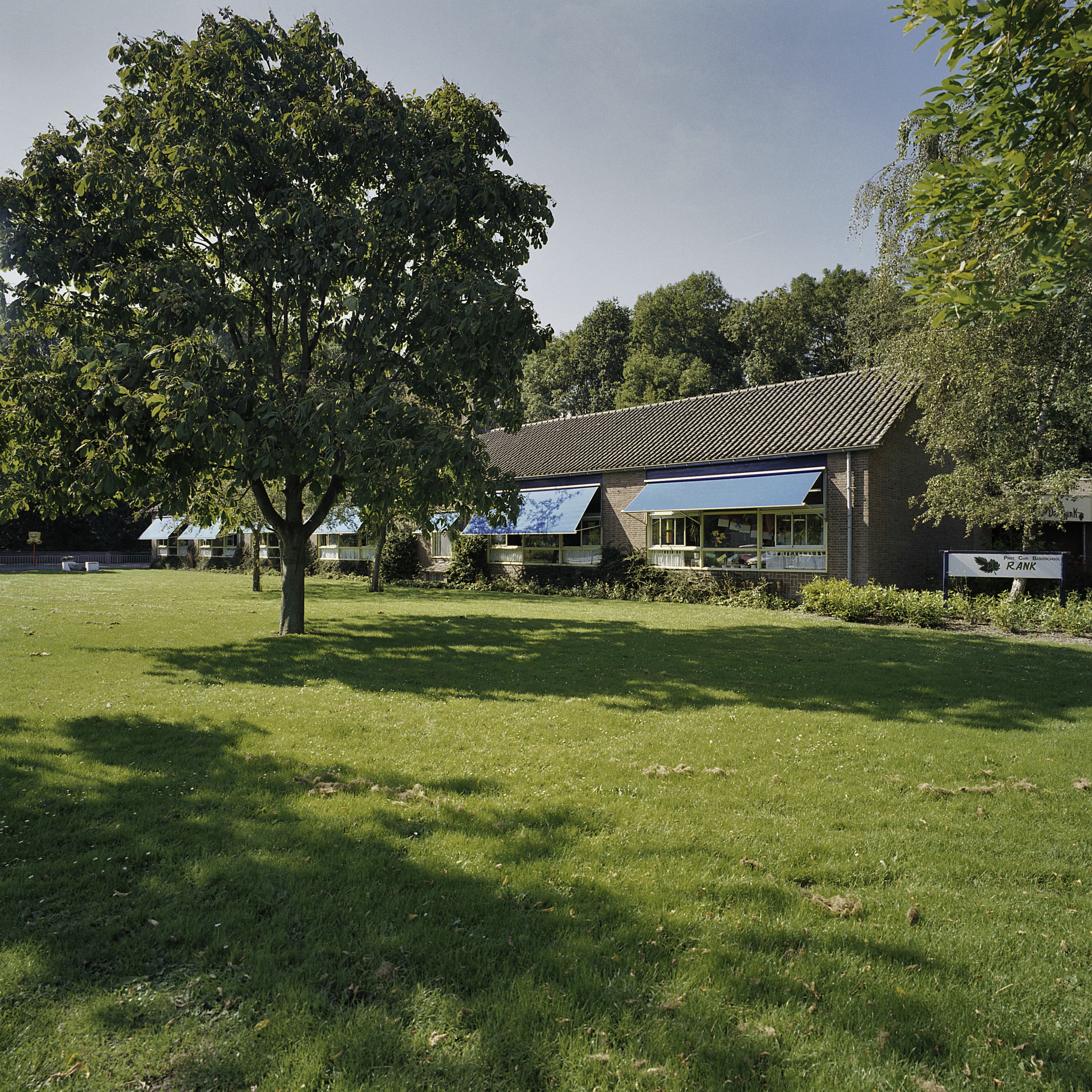
- School in Luttelgeest

- Flag

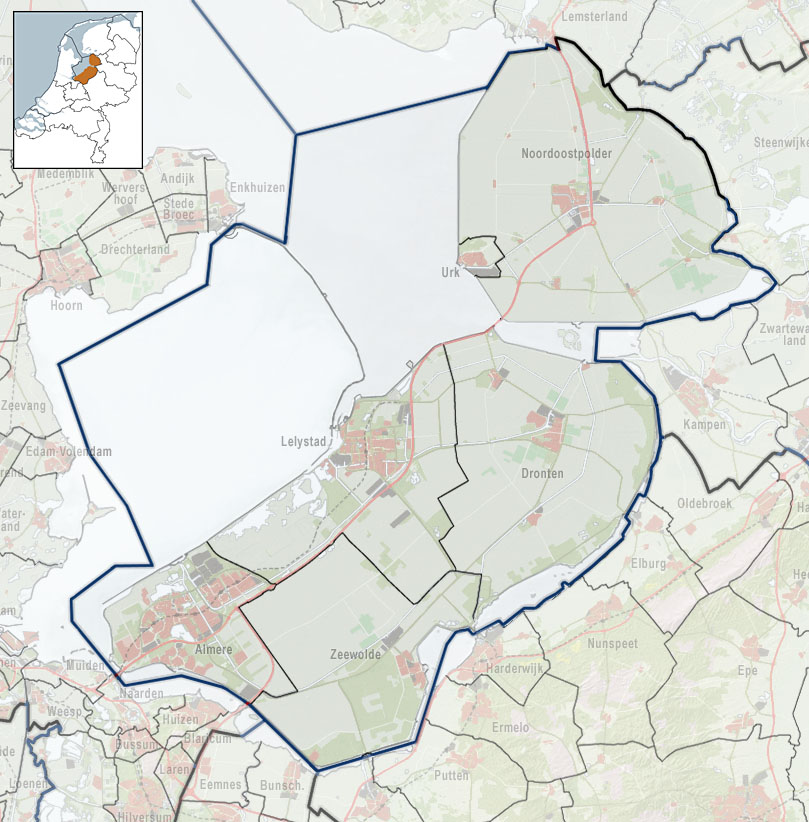
- Location of Luttelgeest in the province of Flevoland Luttelgeest (Netherlands)
- Coordinates: 52°44′35″N 5°51′9″E
- Country: Netherlands
- Province: Flevoland
- Municipality: Noordoostpolder
- Founded: 1950

Area
  - Total: 38.42 km^{2} (14.83 sq mi)
- Elevation: −3.1 m (−10 ft)

Population (2021)
  - Total: 2,285
  - Density: 59.47/km^{2} (154.0/sq mi)
- Time zone: UTC+1 (CET)
  - Summer (DST): UTC+2 (CEST)
- Postal code: 8315
- Dialing code: 0527

Luttelgeest is a village in the Dutch province of Flevoland. It is a part of the municipality of Noordoostpolder, and was created in 1950 as one of ten planned villages around the new city of Emmeloord.

== Name ==
Luttelgeest is named after a no longer existing village with the same name, which used to be near Kuinre, Overijssel. The oldest appearance of the name was in 1379. The meaning of the name translated to English is Little Geest, where 'geest' is a type of landform. The village of Lutjegast in Groningen has a different variant of the same name.

== History ==
In 1942, Camp Luttelgeest was opened for the workers on the Noordoostpolder. In 1949, the plan for the village was approved, and it was founded in 1950. During the construction, the remains of two castles belonging to Kuinre were excavated. The oldest castle was built by Prince-bishop of Utrecht in the 12th century, and was destroyed in 1196 by the Count of Holland. It was rebuilt in 1204 and destroyed in a flood in 1375. In 1378, a castle was built closer to Kuinre, and demolished between 1531 and 1536, because it no longer served a strategic purpose.

The village has been laid out on a triangular pattern, and is surrounded by a green circle.

== Public transportation ==
There is no railway station in Luttelgeest, but the nearest stations are in Kampen and Steenwijk.

== Sports ==
The basketball team and football club SV Tonego is located in Luttelgeest.

== Gallery ==
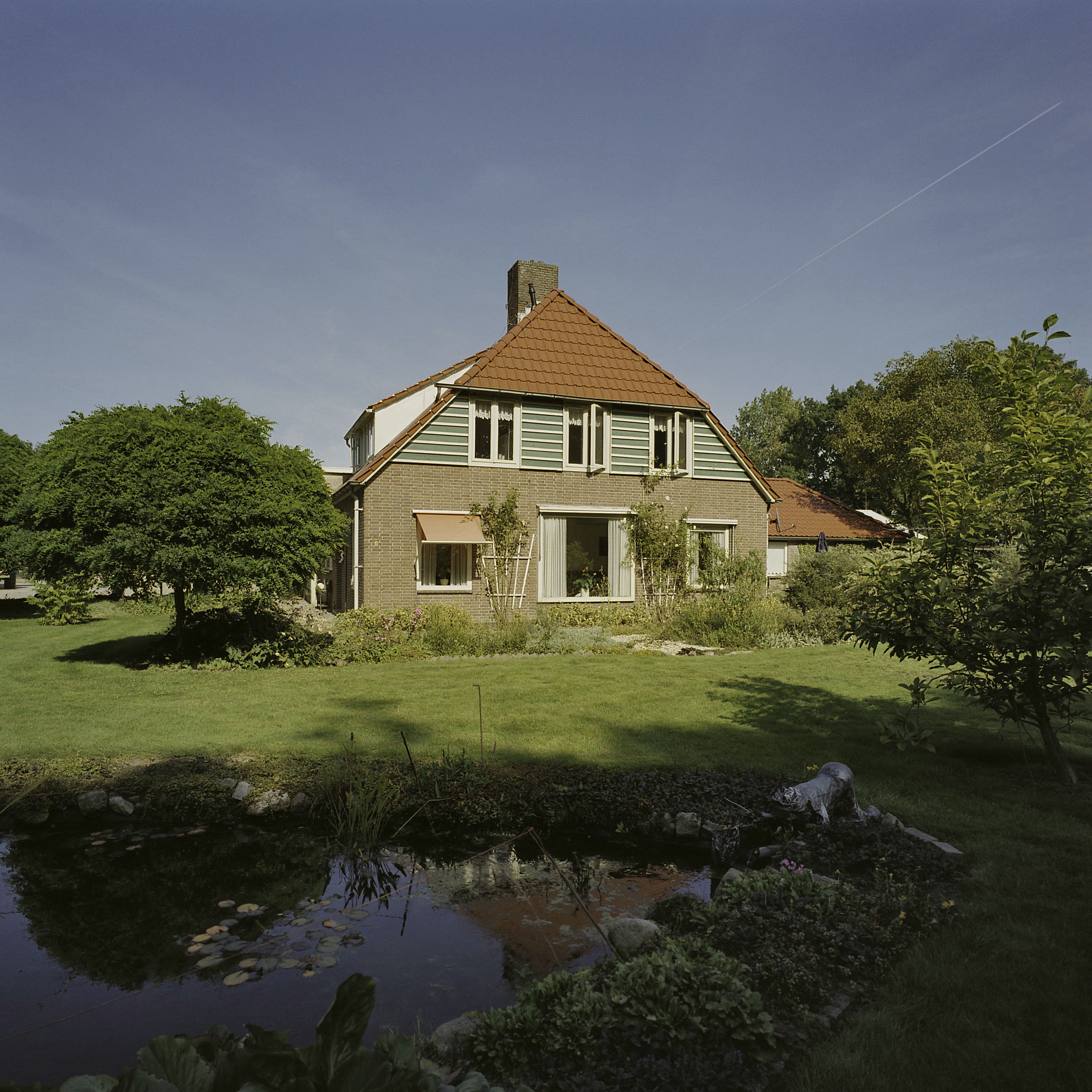
Farm in Luttelgeest

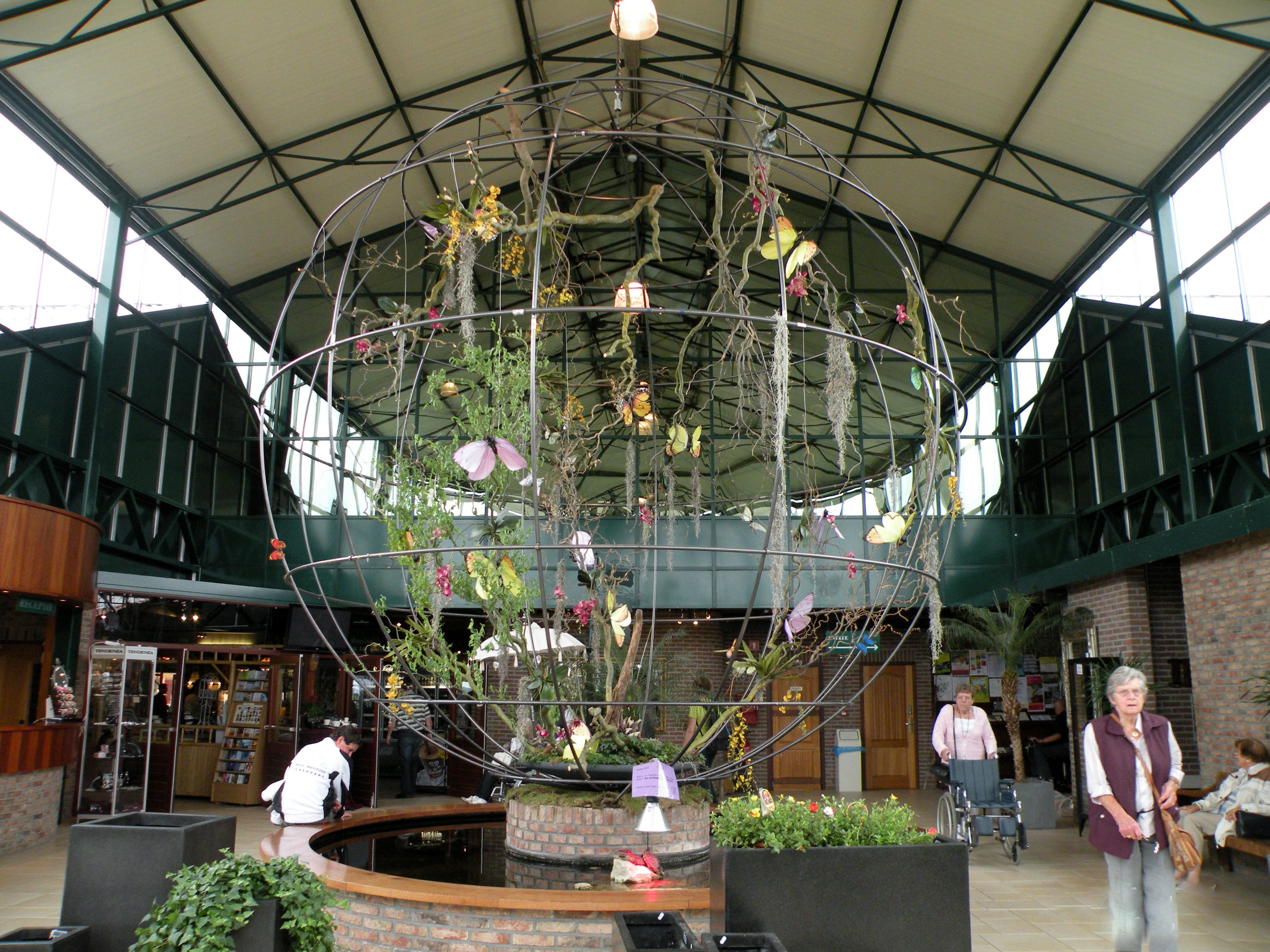
Orchids in Luttelgeest

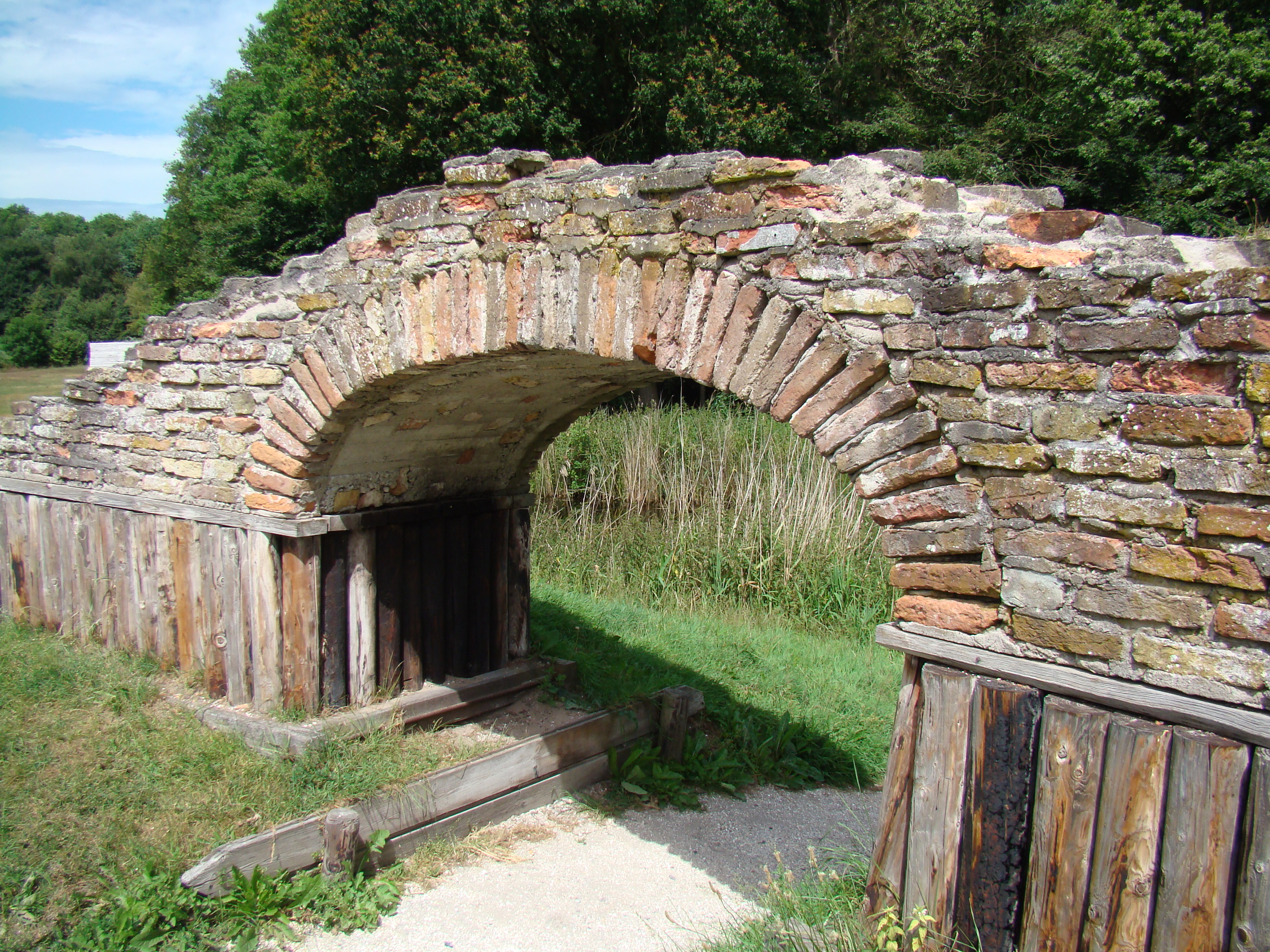
Reconstruction of a gate of the former castle

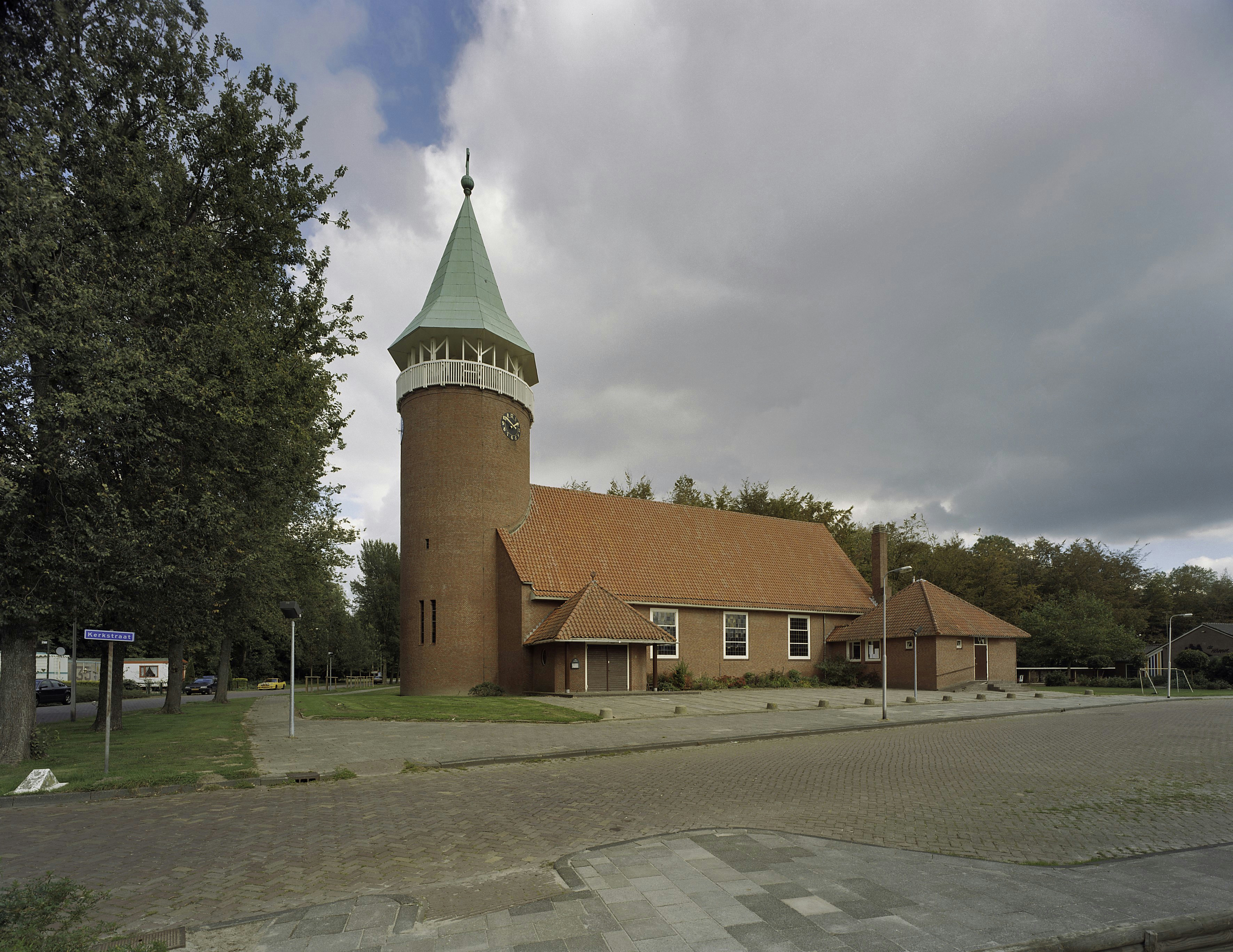
Josef Church
