= Victoria Libertas Pallacanestro =

Italian professional basketball team

Victoria Libertas Pesaro
- Nickname: VL; Vuelle
- Leagues: Serie A2
- Founded: 1 July 1946; 80 years ago
- History: Victoria Pesaro (1946–1965); U.S. Victoria Libertas Pesaro (1965–2006); U.S. Vuelle Pallacanestro (2006–2007); U.S. Victoria Libertas Pallacanestro (2007–present)
- Arena: Vitrifrigo Arena
- Capacity: 10,323
- Location: Pesaro, Marche, Italy
- Team colors: Red and White
- President: Ario Costa
- Team manager: Giacomo Grossi
- Head coach: Giorgio Valli
- Championships: 2 Italian Leagues; 2 Italian Cups; 1 Saporta Cup
- Website: Official Site
Home	Away	Third

Victoria Libertas (also known as "VL" or in Italian Vuelle), full name Unione Sportiva Victoria Libertas Pallacanestro, is a professional basketball team that is based in Pesaro, Italy. The club competes in the second level Italian professional basketball league, the Serie A2. It was commonly known across Europe as Scavolini Pesaro, from the name of its historical main sponsor Scavolini (from 1975 to 2014), an Italian kitchen and bathroom products designer and manufacturer, whose co-founder Valter Scavolini was formerly club president. For past club sponsorship names, see the list below.

== History ==
Victoria Libertas was officially founded in 1946 and had its best seasons during the 1980s. After being among the top teams in Italy for decades, Victoria Libertas under the name Scavolini Pesaro, won its first important trophy the 1982–83 FIBA European Cup Winners' Cup, rival the historic French club of ASVEL. Also Scavolini, participated in consecutive lost finals in 1985–86 against the title holder FC Barcelona and in 1986–87 against Cibona. Since then, Italian League was won twice (in 1988 and 1990), and the Italian Cup was also won twice (in 1985 and 1992). Scavolini participated in 1990–91 FIBA European Champions Cup, and managed to play in the semi-final of the Final Four in Paris where the club eliminated by the legendary Pop 84 (the former Jugoplastika) and ranked fourth after one more defeat in the third place game by Maccabi Tel Aviv. The two lost finals in the FIBA Korać Cup in 1990 (against Ram Joventut) and in 1992 (against il Messaggero Roma) show the dynamic of the club and at the beginning of the new decade.
In recent years, Victoria Libertas was among the best European teams, having played the Euroleague in 2001–02 and 2004–05 seasons. In 2004–05 it unexpectedly got to the Euroleague Top-8 and was defeated in the quarter finals by the eventual champion Maccabi Tel Aviv. Furthermore, Victoria Libertas shooting guard, Charles Smith, was honored with the first-ever Euroleague's Alphonso Ford Top Scorer Trophy, named after the late Euroleague scoring champ who died in 2004 and who was replaced in Victoria Libertas by Smith himself.

=== Recent history ===
In July 2005, as a consequence of the poor administration of the previous two seasons, Victoria Libertas failed to remain within the parameters required to join the Italian Basketball League and wound up. Pesaro's second team, Falco Spar, agreed with former Victoria Libertas president Valter Scavolini to join forces to invest in a team to bring back Victoria Libertas to Italian First Division (Lega Basket Serie A).

The new team, named Scavolini Gruppo Spar (or simply Scavolini-Spar), played the 2005–06 season in the Italian Third Division (B1). Owners' target resulted in Scavolini-Spar having large amounts of money at its disposal compared with the other teams of the league. Players from the upper divisions were enrolled, star Carlton Myers among them, which lead the team to win the league and gain promotion to the Second Division (LegaDue).

In 2006–07 Scavolini-Spar won the LegaDue playoff series, lining up players such as Carlton Myers, Rodney White (9th overall pick of the 2001 NBA draft), Mindaugas Žukauskas (captain of the Lithuanian national basketball team) and Michael Hicks (Panamian national team star). The team was therefore promoted, for the second straight year, to play the Lega Basket Serie A 2007–08 league.

Following the 2009–10 season, Spar's secondary sponsorship contract expired. The club picked up a new secondary sponsor in Italian clothing company Siviglia, thereby changing its full sponsored name to Scavolini Siviglia Style Pesaro (more simply Scavolini Siviglia Pesaro). The club changed its secondary sponsorship again with the expiration of Siviglia's contract at the end of the 2011–12 season, becoming Scavolini Banca Marche Pesaro.

From the 2014–15 season the historical sponsor Scavolini was replaced (for the first time since 1975) by the new main sponsor Consultinvest, whereby the name of the team became Consultinvest Pesaro. Since 2019 summer the new club naming is Carpegna Prosciutto Basket Pesaro thanks to the relationship with the new Title Sponsor Prosciutto di Carpegna.

== Players ==
=== Current roster ===
Carpegna Prosciutto Pesaro roster
Players
Coaches

Pos.	No.	Nat.	Name	Ht.	Age
F	1	(United States)	Mack, Tevin	2.00 m (6 ft 7 in)	29 – 1 May 1997
SG	4	(Italy)	Stefanini, Gabriele	1.91 m (6 ft 3 in)	27 – 18 July 1999
PG	5	(Italy)	Trucchetti, Stefano	1.79 m (5 ft 10 in)	20 – 21 February 2006
SG	7	(Estonia)	Jurkatamm, Mikk (injured)	1.96 m (6 ft 5 in)	26 – 18 September 2000
G	8	(Italy)	Accorsi, Matteo	1.91 m (6 ft 3 in)	19 – 13 May 2007
PG	9	(Italy)	De Nicolao, Andrea	1.85 m (6 ft 1 in)	35 – 21 August 1991
G/F	12	(Italy)	Reginato, Pietro	1.93 m (6 ft 4 in)	19 – 1 February 2007
G	15	(Italy)	Tambone, Matteo (injured) (C)	1.92 m (6 ft 4 in)	32 – 14 May 1994
F	18	(Italy)	Virginio, Nicolò	2.04 m (6 ft 8 in)	23 – 18 March 2003
SF	21	(Italy)	De Vico, Niccolò	1.98 m (6 ft 6 in)	32 – 19 July 1994
F/C	22	(Lithuania)	Miniotas, Regimantas	2.06 m (6 ft 9 in)	30 – 14 March 1996
F	34	(Mali) (Italy)	Sissoko, Cheick Yaya	2.11 m (6 ft 11 in)	18 – 10 October 2007
C	44	(South Sudan) (Italy)	Dut Biar, Andrea Mabor	2.16 m (7 ft 1 in)	24 – 12 December 2001

Head coach

- (Italy) Giorgio Valli

Assistant coach(es)

- (Italy) Giacomo Baioni
- (Italy) Luca Pentucci

Physiotherapist(s)

- (Italy) Davide Tamburini

Legend

- (C) Team captain
- Injured

- Roster
Updated: September 20, 2025

== Honours ==
Total titles: 5

=== Domestic competitions ===
- Italian League

Winners (2): 1987–88, 1989–90
Runners-up (4): 1981–82, 1984–85, 1991–92, 1993–94

- Italian Cup

Winners (2): 1984–85, 1991–92
Runner-up (5): 1985–86, 1986–87, 2000–01, 2003–04, 2021

- Italian Supercup

Runners-up (1): 2001

=== European competitions ===
- EuroLeague

4th place (1): 1990–91
Final Four (1): 1991

- FIBA Saporta Cup (defunct)

Winners (1): 1982–83
Runners-up (2): 1985–86, 1986–87
Semifinalists (2): 1983–84, 1987–88

- FIBA Korać Cup (defunct)

Runners-up (2): 1989–90, 1991–92

- FIBA EuroChallenge

4th place (1): 2009–10
Final Four (1): 2010

=== Worldwide competitions ===
- McDonald's Championship (defunct)

4th place (2): 1988, 1990

=== Other competitions ===
- FIBA International Christmas Tournament (defunct)

4th place (1): 1996

- Torneo de Vasco Martini-Castelfiorentino

Winners (1): 2007

== International record ==
Season	Achievement	Notes
EuroLeague
1988–89	Quarter-finals	6th place in a group with Maccabi Tel Aviv, FC Barcelona, Jugoplastika, Aris, Limoges, CSKA Moscow and Nashua EBBC
1990–91	Final Four	4th place in Paris, lost to Pop 84 87–93 in the semi-final, lost to Maccabi Tel Aviv 81–83 in the 3rd place game
1992–93	Quarter-finals	eliminated 2-1 by Benetton Treviso, 94-92 (W) in Pesaro, 94-101 (L) and 58-77 (L) in Treviso
1994–95	Quarter-finals	eliminated 2-1 by Limoges, 68-55 (W) in Pesaro, 66-79 (L) and 72-82 (L) in Limoges
2000–01	Quarter-finals	eliminated 2-0 by Maccabi Tel Aviv, 69-80 (L) in Tel Aviv and 77-84 (L) in Pesaro
2004–05	Quarter-finals	eliminated 2-0 by Maccabi Tel Aviv, 60-88 (L) in Tel Aviv and 100-103 (L) in Pesaro
FIBA Saporta Cup
1982–83	Champions	defeated ASVEL 111–99 in the final of European Cup Winners' Cup in Palma de Mallorca
1983–84	Semi-finals	eliminated by Simac Milano, 76–78 (L) in Pesaro and 80-90 (L) in Milan
1985–86	Final	lost to FC Barcelona 86–101 in the final (Caserta)
1986–87	Final	lost to Cibona 74–89 in the final (Novi Sad)
1987–88	Semi-finals	eliminated by Limoges, 86–102 (L) in Limoges and 93-91 (W) in Pesaro
FIBA Korać Cup
1989–90	Final	lost to Ram Joventut, 98–99 (L) in Pesaro and 86-96 (L) in Badalona in the double finals of Korać Cup
1991–92	Final	lost to il Messaggero Roma, 94–94 (D) in Rome and 86-99 (L) in Pesaro in the double finals of Korać Cup
1993–94	Quarter-finals	eliminated by PAOK Bravo, 82-66 (W) in Pesaro and 58-96 (L) in Thessaloniki
1995–96	Quarter-finals	eliminated by Teamsystem Bologna, 81-84 (L) in Pesaro and 89-100 (L) in Bologna
FIBA EuroChallenge
2009–10	Final Four	4th place in Göttingen, lost to Krasnye Krylya Samara 70–73 in the semi-final, lost to Chorale Roanne 80–86 in the 3rd place game
McDonald's Championship
1988	4th	4th place in Madrid, lost to Real Madrid 96–108 in the semi-final, lost to Yugoslavia 91–100 in the 3rd place game
1990	4th	4th place in Barcelona, lost to New York Knicks 115–119 in the semi-final, lost to FC Barcelona 105–106 in the 3rd place game

== Logos ==
Former logo

== Arena and supporters ==
In 1996 Victoria Libertas moved from the historic "hangar" arena into the new BPA Palas arena (today: Vitrifrigo Arena) which now hosts its home games. Drawing large audiences from nearby towns and the whole Marche region, in mid 2000s Victoria Libertas was among the top ten basketball teams in Europe for average attendance.

== Notable players ==
Note: Flags indicate national team eligibility at FIBA-sanctioned events. Players may hold other non-FIBA nationalities not displayed.

Criteria

To appear in this section a player must have either:

- Set a club record or won an individual award while at the club
- Played at least one official international match for their national team at any time
- Played at least one official NBA match at any time.

- (Italy) Sandro Dell'Agnello 2 seasons: '94-'96
- (Italy) Paolo Conti 5 seasons: '95-'00
- (Italy) Ario Costa 12 seasons: '84-'96
- (Italy) Franco Bertini
- (Italy) Vincenzo Esposito 2 seasons: '96-'98
- (Italy) Andrea Gracis 11 seasons: '83-'94
- (Italy) Walter Magnifico 19 seasons: '80-'96, '98-'01
- (Italy) Sandro Riminucci
- (Italy) Antonello Riva 2 seasons: '94-'96
- (United States) (Italy) Mike Sylvester 6 season: '80-'86
- (Italy) Renzo Vecchiato 2 seasons: '87-'89
- (Australia) Jason Smith 1 season: '01
- (Canada) Peter Guarasci 3 seasons: '96-'99
- (Cuba) Andrés Guibert 1 season: '97-'98
- (Estonia) Henri Drell 3 seasons: '19-'22
- (Finland) Hanno Möttölä 1 season: '04-'05
- (Finland) Teemu Rannikko 2 seasons: '03-'05
- (France) Yann Bonato 1 season: '97-'98
- (United Kingdom) Robert Archibald 1 season: '04-'05
- (Lithuania) Mindaugas Žukauskas 3 seasons: '06-'09
- (Lithuania) Tautvydas Lydeka 3 seasons: '10-'12 – '15-'16
- (Lithuania) Simas Jasaitis 1 season: '16-'17
- (Lithuania) Donatas Zavackas 1 season: '16-'17
- (Lithuania) Egidijus Mockevičius 2 season: '18-'19 – '23-'24
- (Serbia and Montenegro) Miroslav Berić 2 seasons: '01-'03
- (Serbia and Montenegro) Aleksandar Đorđević 2 seasons: '03-'05
- (Slovenia) Marko Milič 2 seasons: '03-'05
- (Slovenia) Marko Tušek 2 seasons: '00-'02
- (Socialist Federal Republic of Yugoslavia) Željko Jerkov 1 seasons: '82-'83
- (Socialist Federal Republic of Yugoslavia) Dragan Kićanović 2 seasons: '81-'83
- (Socialist Federal Republic of Yugoslavia) Aleksandar Petrović 1 season: '87-'88
- (United States) Greg Ballard 1 season: '87-'88
- (United States) Joseph Blair 2 seasons: '99-'00, '01-'02
- (United States) Myron Brown 1 season: '98-'99
- (United States) Melvin Booker 4 seasons: '97-'98, '99-'02
- (United States) Darwin Cook 3 seasons: '87-'88, '89-'91
- (United States) Lloyd Daniels 1 season: '95-'96
- (United States) Tony Dawson 1 season: '98-'99
- (United States) Todd Day 1 season: '97-'98
- (United States) Darren Daye 5 seasons: '87-'92
- (United States) Larry Drew 1 season: '88-'89
- (United States) Alphonso Ford † 1 season: '03-'04
  (his last team before his untimely death on
  September 4, 2004)
- (United States) Corey Gaines 1 season: '94-'95
- (United States) Dean Garrett 2 seasons: '93-'95
- (United States) Chris Gatling 1 season: '02-'03
- (United States) DeMarco Johnson 2 seasons: '00-'02
- (United States) George McCloud 1 season: '93-'94
- (United States) Aaron McGhee 1 season: '02-'03
- (United States) Scoonie Penn 1 season: '04-'05
- (United States) Norm Richardson 1 season: '02-'03
- (United States) Charles Smith 1 season: '04-'05
- (United States) Kevin Thompson 2 seasons: '95-'97
- (United States) James White 1 season: '11-'12
- (United States) Rodney White 1 season: '06-'07
- (United States) Haywoode Workman 2 seasons: '91-'93
- (United States) Austin Daye 1 season: '15-'16

== Head coaches ==
- (Socialist Federal Republic of Yugoslavia) Petar Skansi 2 seasons: '81-'82, '82-'83
- (Socialist Federal Republic of Yugoslavia) Aleksandar Nikolić 1 season: '83-'84
- (United States) Don Casey 1 season: '84-'85
- (Italy) Valerio Bianchini 5 seasons: '87-'88, '88-'89, '93-'94, '94-'95, '95-'96
- (Italy) Sergio Scariolo 2 seasons: '89-'90, '90-'91
- (Serbia and Montenegro) Duško Vujošević 1 season: '97-'98
- (Italy) Marco Crespi 2 seasons: '02-'03, '04-'05
- (Italy) Piero Bucchi 1 season: '16-17
- (Albania) Spiro Leka 1 season '17-'18
- (Italy) Massimo Galli 1 season '18-'19
- (Italy) Matteo Boniciolli 1 season '19
- (Italy) Federico Perego 1 season '19-present

== Sponsorship names ==
In the past, due to sponsorship deals, it has also been known as:

- Benelli Pesaro (1952–58)
- Lanco Pesaro (1958–61)
- Algor Pesaro (1961–63)
- Butangas Pesaro (1966–69)
- Frizz Pelmo Pesaro (1969–70)
- Tropicali Pesaro (1970–71)
- Maxmobili Pesaro (1971–75)
- Scavolini Pesaro (1975–2014)
- Consultinvest Pesaro (2014–2017)
- No Main Sponsor (2017–2019)
- Carpegna Prosciutto Basket Pesaro (2019–2025)
- No Main Sponsor (2025–2019)
