= 1986–87 FIBA European Cup Winners' Cup =

- League: FIBA European Cup Winners' Cup
- Sport: Basketball

Finals
- Champions: (Socialist Federal Republic of Yugoslavia) Cibona
- Runners-up: (Italy) Scavolini Pesaro

FIBA European Cup Winners' Cup seasons
- ← 1985–86 1987–88 →

The 1986–87 FIBA European Cup Winners' Cup was the twenty-first edition of FIBA's 2nd-tier level European-wide professional club basketball competition, contested between national domestic cup champions, running from 30 September 1986, to 17 March 1987. It was contested by 19 teams, three less than in the previous edition.

The 1985–86 FIBA European Champions Cup winners, Cibona, defeated the 1985–86 FIBA European Cup Winners' Cup runners-up, Scavolini Pesaro, in the final that was held in the Yugoslavia city of Novi Sad.

== Participants ==
Country	Teams	Clubs
Austria	1	Sparkasse Innsbruck
Belgium	1	Maes Pils
Bulgaria	1	Balkan Botevgrad
Cyprus	1	APOEL
Czechoslovakia	1	Nová huť Ostrava
England	1	Polycell Kingston
Finland	1	KTP
France	1	ASVEL
Greece	1	Panathinaikos
Hungary	1	Bajai
Israel	1	Hapoel Holon
Italy	1	Scavolini Pesaro
Luxembourg	1	Soleuvre
Soviet Union	1	CSKA Moscow
Spain	1	Ram Joventut
Switzerland	1	Champel Genève
Turkey	1	Efes Pilsen
West Germany	1	Steiner Bayreuth
(Socialist Federal Republic of Yugoslavia) Yugoslavia	1	Cibona

== First round ==
Team 1	Agg.	Team 2	1st leg	2nd leg
Steiner Bayreuth (West Germany)	151–145	(Greece) Panathinaikos	84–71	67–74
Polycell Kingston (England)	189–195	(Belgium) Maes Pils	99–91	90–104
Sparkasse Innsbruck (Austria)	133–168	(Bulgaria) Balkan Botevgrad	62–78	71–90
Efes Pilsen (Turkey)	179–147	(Switzerland) Champel Genève	91–75	88–72
APOEL (Cyprus)	74–202	(Czechoslovakia) Nová huť Ostrava	36–97	38–105
Soleuvre (Luxembourg)	139–233	(France) ASVEL	78–117	61–116

== Second round ==
Team 1	Agg.	Team 2	1st leg	2nd leg
Steiner Bayreuth (West Germany)	157–190	(Belgium) Maes Pils	83–85	74–105
Balkan Botevgrad (Bulgaria)	146–153	(Turkey) Efes Pilsen	85–77	61–76
KTP (Finland)	192–196	(Czechoslovakia) Nová huť Ostrava	105–86	87–110
Hapoel Holon (Israel)	140–151	(France) ASVEL	86–76	54–75
Bajai (Hungary)	142–167	(Soviet Union) CSKA Moscow	58–84	84–83

Automatically qualified to the Quarter finals group stage

- (Italy) Scavolini Pesaro (finalist)
- (Spain) Ram Joventut
- (Socialist Federal Republic of Yugoslavia) Cibona

== Quarterfinals ==
Key to colors
Top two places in each group advance to semifinals

=== Group A ===
	(Soviet Union) CSKA	(France) ASV	(Spain) JOV	(Czechoslovakia) OST
(Soviet Union) CSKA		102-53	104-89	103-77
(France) ASV	87-85		105-88	106-64
(Spain) JOV	92-106	98-83		98-64
(Czechoslovakia) OST	70-89	83-77	89-110	

	Team	Pld	Pts	W	L	PF	PA	PD
1.	(Soviet Union) CSKA Moscow	6	11	5	1	589	468	+121
2.	(France) ASVEL	6	9	3	3	511	520	-9
3.	(Spain) Ram Joventut	6	9	3	3	575	551	+26
4.	(Czechoslovakia) Nová huť Ostrava	6	7	1	5	447	583	-146

=== Group B ===
	(Socialist Federal Republic of Yugoslavia) CIB	(Italy) SCA	(Turkey) EFE	(Belgium) MPM
(Socialist Federal Republic of Yugoslavia) CIB		123-99	125-78	130-90
(Italy) SCA	82-83		103-66	127-87
(Turkey) EFE	70-86	87-64		89-63
(Belgium) MPM	98-121	89-84	111-90	

	Team	Pld	Pts	W	L	PF	PA	PD
1.	(Socialist Federal Republic of Yugoslavia) Cibona	6	12	6	0	668	517	+151
2.	(Italy) Scavolini Pesaro	6	8	2	4	559	535	+24
3.	(Turkey) Efes Pilsen	6	8	2	4	480	552	-72
4.	(Belgium) Maes Pils Mechelen	6	8	2	4	538	641	-103

== Semifinals ==
Team 1	Agg.	Team 2	1st leg	2nd leg
CSKA Moscow (Soviet Union)	195–204	(Italy) Scavolini Pesaro	107-105	88–99
ASVEL (France)	175–207	(Socialist Federal Republic of Yugoslavia) Cibona	82–98	93–109

== Final ==
March 17, Dvorana SPC "Vojvodina", Novi Sad

Team 1	Score	Team 2
Cibona (Socialist Federal Republic of Yugoslavia)	89–74	(Italy) Scavolini Pesaro

1986–87 FIBA European Cup Winners' Cup Champions

Cibona
2nd title
