= Martini Sparks =

- Leagues: Vrouwen Basketball League
- Founded: 2018
- History: Martini Sparks; 2018–present
- Arena: Scharlakenhof
- Location: Haren, Netherlands
- Team colors: Navy, White
- President: Cees Dijkhuis
- Head coach: Klaas Stoppels
Home	Away

Martini Sparks is a Dutch women's basketball club based in Haren. Since its establishment in 2018, it plays in the Vrouwen Basketball League (VBL), the highest tier in the Netherlands.

== History ==
The club was established in 2018 to become the first team from the province Groningen to play in the Vrouwen Basketball League since 2011. On 22 January 2019, the Sparks won their first game ever as they beat Lekdetec Bemmel 55–47 at home.

== Sponsorship names ==
Due to sponsorship reasons, the team has been known as:

- 2018–present: Keijser Capital Martini Sparks

== Season by season ==
Key
Playoff berth

Season	Tier	League	Regular season					Playoffs	Dutch Cup	Head coach
Season	Tier	League	Finish	Played	Wins	Losses	Win%	Playoffs	Dutch Cup	Head coach
Martini Sparks
2018–19	1	VBL	7th	18	1	17	.056	DNQ	Quarterfinalist	Glenn Pinas
2019–20	1	VBL	7th	25	3	22	.120	DNQ	Quarterfinalist	Klaas Stoppels
2020–21	1	WBL	9th	16	0	16	.000	DNQ		Klaas Stoppels

== Head coaches ==
- (Netherlands) Glenn Pinas (2018–2019)
- (Netherlands) Klaas Stoppels (2019–)
