= Andrea Mabor Dut Biar =

South Sudanese basketball player

No. 44 – Victoria Libertas Pesaro
- Position: Center
- League: Serie A2

Personal information
- Born: 12 December 2001 (age 24) South Sudan
- Listed height: 2.16 m (7 ft 1 in)
- Listed weight: 110 kg (243 lb)

Career history
- 2017–2023: Stella Azzurra Roma
- 2023–2025: Napoli Basket
- 2025–2026: New Basket Brindisi
- 2026–present: Victoria Libertas Pesaro

Andrea Mabor Dut Biar (born December 12, 2001) is a South Sudanese professional basketball player for Victoria Libertas Pesaro of the Italian Serie A2. He also holds Italian citizenship.

== Biography ==
Born in Sudan in 2001, at the age of nine he moved to live with his relatives in South Sudan, where since 2013 he was involved in the civil war that broke out in the African country. In 2017 he arrived in Italy, where he joined the youth team of Stella Azzurra Roma, where he remained and joined the first team until 2023, when he joined the Lega Basket Serie A team Napoli Basket. He won the Coppa Italia with the team in 2024.
