= 1985–86 FIBA European Cup Winners' Cup =

- League: FIBA European Cup Winners' Cup
- Sport: Basketball

Finals
- Champions: (Spain) FC Barcelona
- Runners-up: (Italy) Scavolini Pesaro

FIBA European Cup Winners' Cup seasons
- ← 1984–85 1986–87 →

The 1985–86 FIBA European Cup Winners' Cup was the twentieth edition of FIBA's 2nd-tier level European-wide professional club basketball competition, contested between national domestic cup champions, running from 1 October 1985, to 18 March 1986. It was contested by 22 teams, two more than in the previous edition.

Defending champions FC Barcelona, defeated Scavolini Pesaro in the final, which was held in Caserta, to win its second trophy. They became the third team to successfully defend its title. It was the third title in a row for a Spanish League team.

== Participants ==
Country	Teams	Clubs	
Spain	2	Ron Negrita Joventut	FC Barcelona
Austria	1	Landys&Gyr Wien	
Belgium	1	Opel Merksem	
Bulgaria	1	CSKA Sofia	
Cyprus	1	ENAD	
Czechoslovakia	1	Chemosvit	
England	1	Manchester United	
Finland	1	KTP	
France	1	Stade Français	
Greece	1	Panathinaikos	
Hungary	1	Csepel	
Iceland	1	Haukar	
Israel	1	Maccabi Haifa	
Italy	1	Scavolini Pesaro	
Luxembourg	1	Sparta Bertrange	
Netherlands	1	Permalens Haaksbergen	
Soviet Union	1	CSKA Moscow	
Sweden	1	Täby	
Switzerland	1	Vevey	
Turkey	1	Fenerbahçe	
(Socialist Federal Republic of Yugoslavia) Yugoslavia	1	Jugoplastika	

== First round ==
Team 1	Agg.	Team 2	1st leg	2nd leg
Manchester United (England)	179–143	(Netherlands) Permalens Haaksbergen	95–58	84–85
Chemosvit (Czechoslovakia)	175–170	(Turkey) Fenerbahçe	104–76	71–94
Haukar (Iceland)	170–172	(Sweden) Täby	88–83	82–89
Opel Merksem (Belgium)	167–171	(Italy) Scavolini Pesaro	84–87	83–84
KTP (Finland)	153–150	(Hungary) Csepel	81–75	72–75
CSKA Sofia (Bulgaria)	172–183	(Socialist Federal Republic of Yugoslavia) Jugoplastika	85–84	87–99
ENAD (Cyprus)	113–219	(Israel) Maccabi Haifa	58–125	55–94
Sparta Bertrange (Luxembourg)	145–190	(Greece) Panathinaikos	73–101	72–89

== Second round ==
Team 1	Agg.	Team 2	1st leg	2nd leg
Manchester United (England)	135–217	(Spain) Ron Negrita Joventut	74–105	61–112
Chemosvit (Czechoslovakia)	151–187	(France) Stade Français	80–84	71–103
Täby (Sweden)	183–199	(Italy) Scavolini Pesaro	86–100	97–99
KTP (Finland)	166–183	(Austria) Landys&Gyr Wien	80–88	86–95
Jugoplastika (Socialist Federal Republic of Yugoslavia)	201–164	(Israel) Maccabi Haifa	114–78	87–86
Vevey (Switzerland)	166–154	(Greece) Panathinaikos	82–75	84–79

Automatically qualified to the Quarter finals group stage

- (Spain) FC Barcelona (title holder)
- (Soviet Union) CSKA Moscow

== Quarterfinals ==
Key to colors
Top two places in each group advance to semifinals

=== Group A ===
	(Spain) FCB	(Italy) SCA	(Socialist Federal Republic of Yugoslavia) JUG	(Austria) LGW
(Spain) FCB		119-102	103-98	124-85
(Italy) SCA	109-106		101-97	115-91
(Socialist Federal Republic of Yugoslavia) JUG	90-99	108-91		111-81
(Austria) LGW	91-119	96-114	82-122	

	Team	Pld	Pts	W	L	PF	PA	PD
1.	(Spain) FC Barcelona	6	11	5	1	670	575	+95
2.	(Italy) Scavolini Pesaro	6	10	4	2	632	617	+15
3.	(Socialist Federal Republic of Yugoslavia) Jugoplastika	6	9	3	3	626	557	+69
4.	(Austria) Landys&Gyr Wien	6	6	0	6	526	705	-179

=== Group B ===
	(Spain) JOV	(Soviet Union) CSKA	(France) STF	(Switzerland) VEV
(Spain) JOV		98-84	95-77	126-75
(Soviet Union) CSKA	99-83		104-77	118-84
(France) STF	90-113	83-82		129-87
(Switzerland) VEV	81-103	75-85	77-70	

	Team	Pld	Pts	W	L	PF	PA	PD
1.	(Spain) Ron Negrita Joventut	6	11	5	1	618	506	+112
2.	(Soviet Union) CSKA Moscow	6	10	4	2	572	500	+72
3.	(France) Stade Français	6	8	2	4	526	558	-32
4.	(Switzerland) Vevey	6	7	1	5	479	631	-152

== Semifinals ==
Team 1	Agg.	Team 2	1st leg	2nd leg
FC Barcelona (Spain)	184–169	(Soviet Union) CSKA Moscow	100-81	84–88
Scavolini Pesaro (Italy)	216–214	(Spain) Ron Negrita Joventut	109–100	107–114

== Final ==
March 18, PalaMaggiò di Castel Morrone, Caserta

Team 1	Score	Team 2
FC Barcelona (Spain)	101–86	(Italy) Scavolini Pesaro

1985–86 FIBA European Cup Winners' Cup Champions

FC Barcelona
2nd title
