= Nino Gorissen =

Dutch basketball player

Personal information
- Born: 31 December 1997 (age 28)
- Listed height: 1.75 m (5 ft 9 in)

Career information
- Playing career: 2015–2023
- Position: Point guard
- Number: 4

Career history
- 2015–2017: Landslake Lions
- 2017–2019: BAL
- 2019–2023: Den Helder Suns

Career highlights
- DBL All-Rookie Team (2018)

Nino Pierre Gorissen (born 31 December 1997) is a Dutch former professional basketball player. He was the captain for the Den Helder Suns. He is the shortest player to ever play in the BNXT League, being 1.75 m (5 ft 9 in) tall. He formerly played for BAL Weert, in the now replaced DBL.

== Professional career ==
Gorissen started playing basketball at the age of 6 when he joined the Landslake Lions. He would continue playing there until the age of 15 when he moved to Bolwerk Waterland which was collaborating with the Landslake Lions at the time. He would however return to the Landslake Lions in 2015 where he played in the Promotiedivisie for two years. Afterwards in 2017 Gorissen moved to BAL Weert. He made his Dutch Basketball League (DBL) debut on 8 October 2017 in a 96–80 loss against Aris Leeuwarden scoring 6 points and stealing the ball 3 times. In 2018 he became the shortest person ever to be selected for the DBL All-Rookie Team. On 20 June 2019, Gorissen joined the Den Helder Suns where as of the 2022-2023 season he is still playing.

== National team career ==
=== Junior national team ===
Gorissen played for the Netherlands during the 2017 FIBA U20 European Championship Division B. They ended up at 10th place.
