= Naomi Halman =

Dutch former basketball player

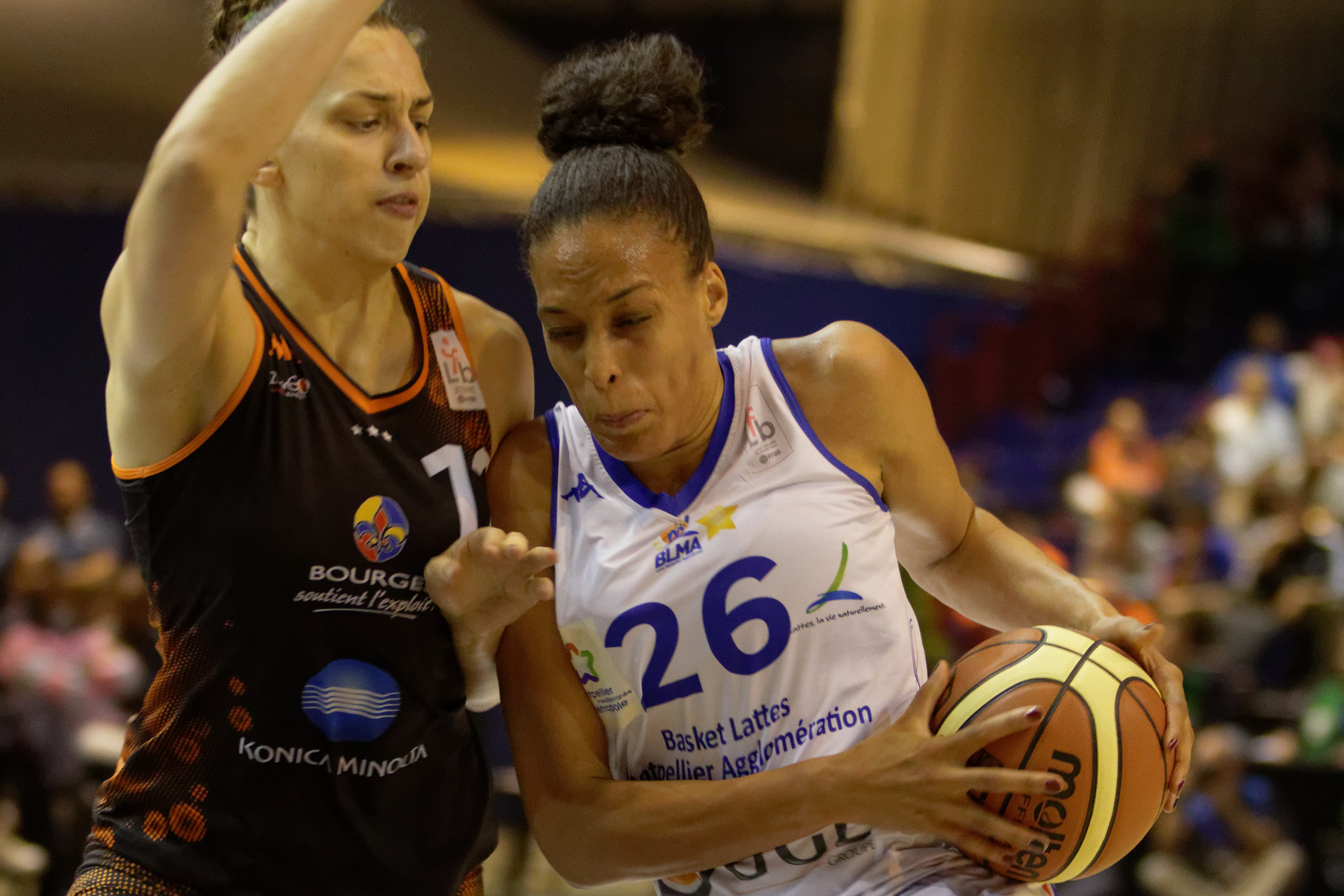
- Halman with Montpellier in 2015

No. 26 – Triple Threat
- Position: Power forward / center
- League: Women's Basketball League

Personal information
- Born: 10 January 1986 (age 40) Haarlem, Netherlands
- Listed height: 1.91 m (6 ft 3 in)

Career information
- College: UC Irvine
- Playing career: 2006–present

Career history
- –: BV Lely
- 2008–2009: Gran Canaria
- 2009–2010: Basket Parma
- 2010–2011: Faenza
- 2011–2013: PF Umbertide
- 2013–2014: Gesam Gas Lucca
- 2014–2018: Montpellier
- 2020–2021: Triple Threat

Career highlights
- LFB champion (2016); 2× French Cup winner (2015, 2016)

Naomi Halman (born 10 January 1986) is a Dutch former basketball player who played for Triple Threat of the Women's Basketball League (WBL). During her career, she also played for the Netherlands national team in 44 international games.

== Basketball career ==
Halman played on the UC Irvine women's college basketball team in 2006, scoring 9.3 points per game in 10 games for the Anteaters. She left the team in December 2006 to attend to family issues in the Netherlands and did not play for the team again.

Halman played four seasons for Montpellier in the French LFB and the EuroLeague Women. She retired in 2018 when she became pregnant.

In July 2020, Halman came out of retirement to join Triple Threat, a team in her hometown of Haarlem, for its debut in the Women's Basketball League. She played in 12 games for Triple Threat in the 2020–2021, averaging 14.6 points per game and 9.7 rebounds per game. She did not play for the team the following season.

== Personal ==
Halman is the daughter of Eddy Halman, a former baseball player who played for the Dutch national team. Her brother Greg Halman played in Major League Baseball, but he died in 2011 after being stabbed by her other brother, Jason Halman. Her sister, Eva Halman, played in the top Dutch softball league for several years.

Halman has a daughter.
