= Lekdetec Bemmel =

Lekdetec.nl Bemmel
- Leagues: Women's Basketball League
- Founded: 2010
- History: Lekdetec.nl Bemmel; 2010–present
- Arena: De Schaapskooi
- Capacity: 650
- Location: Bemmel, Netherlands
- Main sponsor: Lekdetec.nl
- President: Jeroen Guldemond
- Head coach: Daan de Heus
- Championships: 2 (2015, 2017)
Home

Stichting Topbasketball Lingewaard, for sponsorships reason named Lekdetec.nl Bemmel, is a Dutch professional women's basketball team based in Bemmel. The team is the professional women's section of Batouwe Basketball and was founded in 2010 as Lekdetec. The team has won the WBL twice, in 2015 and 2017.

== Honours ==
Women's Basketball League

- Champions (2): 2014–15, 2016–17

Carla de Liefde Trophy

- Winners (3): 2012, 2016, 2017

WBL Final Four

- Winners (1): 2018

Supercup

- Winners (1): 2015

== Notable players ==
- Tanya Bröring (2011)
