= Keime Helfrich =

Dutch basketball player

No. 10 – QSTA United
- Position: Small forward
- League: BNXT League

Personal information
- Born: 5 September 1997 (age 29) Zevenaar, Netherlands
- Listed height: 2.00 m (6 ft 7 in)
- Listed weight: 92 kg (203 lb)

Career information
- Playing career: 2015–present

Career history
- 2015–2018: Landstede Zwolle
- 2020–2021: Yoast United
- 2021–2024: Heroes Den Bosch
- 2024–present: Yoast United

Career highlights
- Dutch national champion (2022)

Keime Helfrich (born 5 September 1997) is a Dutch professional basketball player for the QSTA United of the BNXT League. Standing at 2.00 m (6 ft 6 1/2 in), he mainly plays as small forward.

== Early life ==
After playing for the club Pigeons in Duiven, Helfrich entered the youth academy of Landstede Basketbal.

== Professional career ==
Helfrich made his professional debut for Landstede Basketbal in the 2015–16 season. As an occasional member of the Landstede roster, he appeared in 14 games over three seasons. After this, he played two seasons for Promotiedivisie club Dreamfield Dolphins.

On 21 August 2020, Helfrich signed with Yoast United, marking his return to the first tier Dutch Basketball League. He averaged 12.4 points and 4.3 rebounds in the 2020–21 season with Yoast.

On 1 June 2021, Helfrich signed a 3-year contract with Heroes Den Bosch.
