= SV Tonego =

sv Tonego
- Founded: 1954; 71 years ago
- Location: Luttelgeest, Netherlands
- Championships: 3 Dames Eredivisie
- Website: www.tonego.nl

Sportvereniging Tot Ons Nut En Genoegen Opgericht or simply SV Tonego is a Dutch sports club from Luttelgeest. From 1980 to 1988, the basketball team was located in Haaksbergen as Hatrans Haaksbergen and played in the professional Dutch Basketball League.

== History ==
TONEGO was founded in 1954. It is a club with four departments: gym, tennis, volleyball and football. The first football team plays in the Third Class Saturday (2014/15).

== Football ==
The football division club has 300 members and has 7 senior teams (including 2 women), three junior teams, six pupils teams and two futsal teams. TONEGO plays on their own sports park.

== Basketball ==
From 1980 to 1988 TONEGO had a basketball section that was playing in Eredivisie under the sponsor names Hatrans Tonego Haaksbergen (1980–81), Hatrans Haaksbergen (1981–84 & 1986–88) and Permalens Haaksbergen (1984–86). In 1982–83 the team reached the playoff finals. Also the club participated three consecutive times (1983–84, 1984–85 & 1985–86) in FIBA Saporta Cup

=== Honours ===
==== Men's team ====
Eredivisie

- Runners-up (1): 1982–83

==== Women's team ====
Dames Eredivisie

- Champions (3): 1992–93, 1993–94, 1994–95
