= 1983–84 FIBA European Cup Winners' Cup =

- League: FIBA European Cup Winners' Cup
- Sport: Basketball

Finals
- Champions: (Spain) Real Madrid
- Runners-up: (Italy) Simac Milano

FIBA European Cup Winners' Cup seasons
- ← 1982–83 1984–85 →

The 1983–84 FIBA European Cup Winners' Cup was the eighteenth edition of FIBA's 2nd-tier level European-wide professional club basketball competition, contested between national domestic cup champions, running from 27 September 1983, to 14 March 1984. It was contested by 24 teams, five more than in the previous edition.

Real Madrid defeated Simac Milano, in the final held in Ostend, winning its first FIBA European Cup Winners' Cup.

== Participants ==
| Country | Teams | Clubs | |
|---|---|---|---|
| Italy | 2 | Simac Milano | Scavolini Pesaro |
| Austria | 1 | Landys&Gyr Wien | |
| Belgium | 1 | Maccabi Brussels | |
| Bulgaria | 1 | Levski-Spartak | |
| Cyprus | 1 | Achilleas | |
| Czechoslovakia | 1 | Rudá hvězda Pardubice | |
| Denmark | 1 | BMS | |
| Egypt | 1 | Al-Zamalek | |
| England | 1 | Solent Stars | |
| Finland | 1 | Turun NMKY | |
| France | 1 | Monaco | |
| Greece | 1 | Panathinaikos | |
| Hungary | 1 | Soproni MAFC | |
| Israel | 1 | Hapoel Tel Aviv | |
| Netherlands | 1 | Hatrans Haaksbergen | |
| Portugal | 1 | Queluz Pioneer | |
| Romania | 1 | Steaua București | |
| Spain | 1 | Real Madrid | |
| Sweden | 1 | Hageby | |
| Switzerland | 1 | Vevey | |
| Turkey | 1 | Fenerbahçe | |
| West Germany | 1 | Saturn Köln | |
| (Socialist Federal Republic of Yugoslavia) Yugoslavia | 1 | Cibona | |

== First round ==
| Team 1 | Agg. | Team 2 | 1st leg | 2nd leg |
|---|---|---|---|---|
| Fenerbahçe (Turkey) | 146–150 | (Romania) Steaua București | 81–67 | 65–83 |
| BMS (Denmark) | 169–213 | (Socialist Federal Republic of Yugoslavia) Cibona | 81–102 | 88–111 |
| Rudá hvězda Pardubice (Czechoslovakia) | 185–166 | (Portugal) Queluz Pioneer | 122–76 | 63–90 |
| Solent Stars (England) | 173–154 | (Netherlands) Hatrans Haaksbergen | 78–71 | 95–83 |
| Maccabi Brussels (Belgium) | 163–135 | (Israel) Hapoel Tel Aviv | 86–72 | 77–63 |
| Saturn Köln (West Germany) | 303–102 | (Cyprus) Achilleas | 162–44 | 141–58 |
| Hageby (Sweden) | 157–160 | (France) Monaco | 60–61 | 97–99 |
| Al-Zamalek (Egypt) | 0–4* | (Austria) Landys&Gyr Wien | 0–2 | 0–2 |
| Levski-Spartak (Bulgaria) | 152–169 | (Greece) Panathinaikos | 73–81 | 79–88 |
| Vevey (Switzerland) | 204–159 | (Hungary) Soproni MAFC | 107–69 | 97–90 |

*Al-Zamalek withdrew before the first leg, and Landys&Gyr Wien received a forfeit (2-0) in both games.

== Second round ==
| Team 1 | Agg. | Team 2 | 1st leg | 2nd leg |
|---|---|---|---|---|
| Steaua București (Romania) | 166–175 | (Socialist Federal Republic of Yugoslavia) Cibona | 82–82 | 84–93 |
| Rudá hvězda Pardubice (Czechoslovakia) | 178–176 | (Finland) Turun NMKY | 87–89 | 91–87 |
| Solent Stars (England) | 153–119 | (Belgium) Maccabi Brussels | 88–58 | 65–61 |
| Saturn Köln (West Germany) | 177–143 | (France) Monaco | 108–83 | 69–60 |
| Landys&Gyr Wien (Austria) | 137–145 | (Greece) Panathinaikos | 83–79 | 54–66 |
| Vevey (Switzerland) | 156–186 | (Italy) Simac Milano | 71–88 | 85–98 |

Automatically qualified to the Quarter finals group stage

- (Italy) Scavolini Pesaro (title holder)
- (Spain) Real Madrid

== Quarterfinals ==
Key to colors
| Top two places in each group advance to semifinals |

=== Group A ===
| | (Italy) MIL | (Socialist Federal Republic of Yugoslavia) CIB | (West Germany) SAT | (England) SOL |
|---|---|---|---|---|
| (Italy) MIL | | 82-69 | 75-81 | 61-67 |
| (Socialist Federal Republic of Yugoslavia) CIB | 84-80 | | 82-71 | 78-84 |
| (West Germany) SAT | 80-90 | 92-90 | | 74-61 |
| (England) SOL | 68-78 | 77-92 | 82-78 | |

| | Team | Pld | Pts | W | L | PF | PA | PD |
|---|---|---|---|---|---|---|---|---|
| 1. | (Italy) Simac Milano | 6 | 9 | 3 | 3 | 466 | 449 | +17 |
| 2. | (Socialist Federal Republic of Yugoslavia) Cibona | 6 | 9 | 3 | 3 | 495 | 486 | +9 |
| 3. | (West Germany) Saturn Köln | 6 | 9 | 3 | 3 | 476 | 480 | -4 |
| 4. | (England) Solent Stars | 6 | 9 | 3 | 3 | 439 | 461 | -22 |

=== Group B ===
| | (Spain) RMD | (Italy) SCA | (Greece) PAO | (Czechoslovakia) PAR |
|---|---|---|---|---|
| (Spain) RMD | | 99-97 | 104-78 | 113-62 |
| (Italy) SCA | 77-87 | | 87-75 | 98-75 |
| (Greece) PAO | 99-97 | 75-76 | | 91-78 |
| (Czechoslovakia) PAR | 67-93 | 104-102 | 94-82 | |

| | Team | Pld | Pts | W | L | PF | PA | PD |
|---|---|---|---|---|---|---|---|---|
| 1. | (Spain) Real Madrid | 6 | 11 | 5 | 1 | 593 | 480 | +113 |
| 2. | (Italy) Scavolini Pesaro | 6 | 9 | 3 | 3 | 537 | 515 | +22 |
| 3. | (Greece) Panathinaikos | 6 | 8 | 2 | 4 | 500 | 536 | -36 |
| 4. | (Czechoslovakia) Rudá hvězda Pardubice | 6 | 8 | 2 | 4 | 480 | 579 | -99 |

== Semifinals ==
| Team 1 | Agg. | Team 2 | 1st leg | 2nd leg |
|---|---|---|---|---|
| Scavolini Pesaro (Italy) | 156–168 | (Italy) Simac Milano | 76–78 | 80–90 |
| Cibona (Socialist Federal Republic of Yugoslavia) | 169–185 | (Spain) Real Madrid | 89–91 | 80–94 |

== Final ==
March 14, Stedelijk Sportcentrum, Ostend

| Team 1 | Score | Team 2 |
|---|---|---|
| Real Madrid (Spain) | 82–81 | (Italy) Simac Milano |

1983–84 FIBA European Cup Winners' Cup Champions

Real Madrid
1st title
