= 1982–83 FIBA European Cup Winners' Cup =

- League: FIBA European Cup Winners' Cup
- Sport: Basketball

Finals
- Champions: (Italy) Scavolini Pesaro
- Runners-up: (France) ASVEL

FIBA European Cup Winners' Cup seasons
- ← 1981–82 1983–84 →

The 1982–83 FIBA European Cup Winners' Cup was the seventeenth edition of FIBA's 2nd-tier level European-wide professional club basketball competition, contested between national domestic cup champions, running from 5 October 1982 to 9 March 1983. It was contested by 19 teams, four less than in the previous edition.

Scavolini Pesaro defeated ASVEL, in the final held in Palma de Mallorca, winning its first FIBA European Cup Winners' Cup.

== Participants ==
| Country | Teams | Clubs |
|---|---|---|
| Austria | 1 | Klosterneuburg |
| Cyprus | 1 | AEL |
| Czechoslovakia | 1 | Inter Slovnaft |
| Egypt | 1 | Al-Zamalek |
| England | 1 | Solent Stars |
| Finland | 1 | Pantterit |
| France | 1 | ASVEL |
| Greece | 1 | PAOK |
| Hungary | 1 | Soproni MAFC |
| Israel | 1 | Hapoel Ramat Gan |
| Italy | 1 | Scavolini Pesaro |
| Luxembourg | 1 | Etzella |
| Netherlands | 1 | Nashua Den Bosch |
| Soviet Union | 1 | Stroitel Kyiv |
| Spain | 1 | FC Barcelona |
| Sweden | 1 | Solna |
| Switzerland | 1 | FV Lugano |
| Turkey | 1 | Beşiktaş |
| (Socialist Federal Republic of Yugoslavia) Yugoslavia | 1 | ZZI Olimpija |

== First round ==
| Team 1 | Agg. | Team 2 | 1st leg | 2nd leg |
|---|---|---|---|---|
| AEL (Cyprus) | 105–231 | (Greece) PAOK | 51–120 | 54–111 |
| Al-Zamalek (Egypt) | 130–201 | (England) Solent Stars | 60–80 | 70–121 |
| Pantterit (Finland) | 141–164 | (Sweden) Solna | 66–75 | 75–89 |
| Etzella (Luxembourg) | 178–219 | (Austria) Klosterneuburg | 90–109 | 88–110 |
| Beşiktaş (Turkey) | 126–160 | (Hungary) Soproni MAFC | 61–74 | 65–86 |

== Second round ==
| Team 1 | Agg. | Team 2 | 1st leg | 2nd leg |
|---|---|---|---|---|
| PAOK (Greece) | 155–157 | (Israel) Hapoel Ramat Gan | 86–78 | 69–79 |
| Solent Stars (England) | 140–191 | (Netherlands) Nashua Den Bosch | 70–101 | 70–90 |
| ASVEL (France) | 201–172 | (Sweden) Solna | 94–69 | 107–103 |
| Klosterneuburg (Austria) | 157–175 | (Czechoslovakia) Inter Slovnaft | 74–64 | 83–111 |
| Soproni MAFC (Hungary) | 4–0* | (Soviet Union) Stroitel Kyiv | 2–0 | 2–0 |
| FV Lugano (Switzerland) | 171–218 | (Italy) Scavolini Pesaro | 95-114 | 76–104 |

*Stroitel withdrew before the first leg, and MAFC received a forfeit (2-0) in both games.

Automatically qualified to the Quarter finals group stage

- (Socialist Federal Republic of Yugoslavia) ZZI Olimpija
- (Spain) FC Barcelona

== Quarterfinals ==
Key to colors
| Top two places in each group advance to semifinals |

=== Group A ===
| | (Italy) SCA | (Netherlands) EBBC | (Spain) FCB | (Israel) HRG |
|---|---|---|---|---|
| (Italy) SCA | | 95-82 | 103-93 | 102-87 |
| (Netherlands) EBBC | 72-67 | | 86-76 | 84-82 |
| (Spain) FCB | 122-92 | 82-59 | | 95-86 |
| (Israel) HRG | 103-105 | 82-85 | 105-99 | |

| | Team | Pld | Pts | W | L | PF | PA | PD |
|---|---|---|---|---|---|---|---|---|
| 1. | (Italy) Scavolini Pesaro | 6 | 10 | 4 | 2 | 564 | 559 | +5 |
| 2. | (Netherlands) Nashua Den Bosch | 6 | 10 | 4 | 2 | 468 | 484 | -16 |
| 3. | (Spain) FC Barcelona | 6 | 9 | 3 | 3 | 567 | 531 | +36 |
| 4. | (Israel) Hapoel Ramat Gan | 6 | 7 | 1 | 5 | 545 | 570 | -25 |

=== Group B ===
| | (France) ASV | (Socialist Federal Republic of Yugoslavia) OLI | (Czechoslovakia) INT | (Hungary) SOP |
|---|---|---|---|---|
| (France) ASV | | 117-95 | 110-84 | 85-73 |
| (Socialist Federal Republic of Yugoslavia) OLI | 92-89 | | 97-90 | 106-88 |
| (Czechoslovakia) INT | 87-103 | 101-95 | | 102-68 |
| (Hungary) SOP | 83-100 | 75-92 | 92-80 | |

| | Team | Pld | Pts | W | L | PF | PA | PD |
|---|---|---|---|---|---|---|---|---|
| 1. | (France) ASVEL | 6 | 11 | 5 | 1 | 604 | 514 | +90 |
| 2. | (Socialist Federal Republic of Yugoslavia) ZZI Olimpija | 6 | 10 | 4 | 2 | 577 | 560 | +17 |
| 3. | (Czechoslovakia) Inter Slovnaft | 6 | 8 | 2 | 4 | 544 | 565 | -21 |
| 4. | (Hungary) Soproni MAFC | 6 | 7 | 1 | 5 | 479 | 565 | -86 |

== Semifinals ==
| Team 1 | Agg. | Team 2 | 1st leg | 2nd leg |
|---|---|---|---|---|
| Scavolini Pesaro (Italy) | 204–170 | (Socialist Federal Republic of Yugoslavia) ZZI Olimpija | 97–78 | 107–92 |
| ASVEL (France) | 169–159 | (Netherlands) Nashua Den Bosch | 88–83 | 81–76 |

== Final ==
March 9, Palacio Municipal de Deportes, Palma de Mallorca

| Team 1 | Score | Team 2 |
|---|---|---|
| Scavolini Pesaro (Italy) | 111–99 | (France) ASVEL |

1984–85 FIBA European Cup Winners' Cup Champions

Scavolini Pesaro
1st title
