= Greg Halman =

Dutch baseball player (1987–2011)

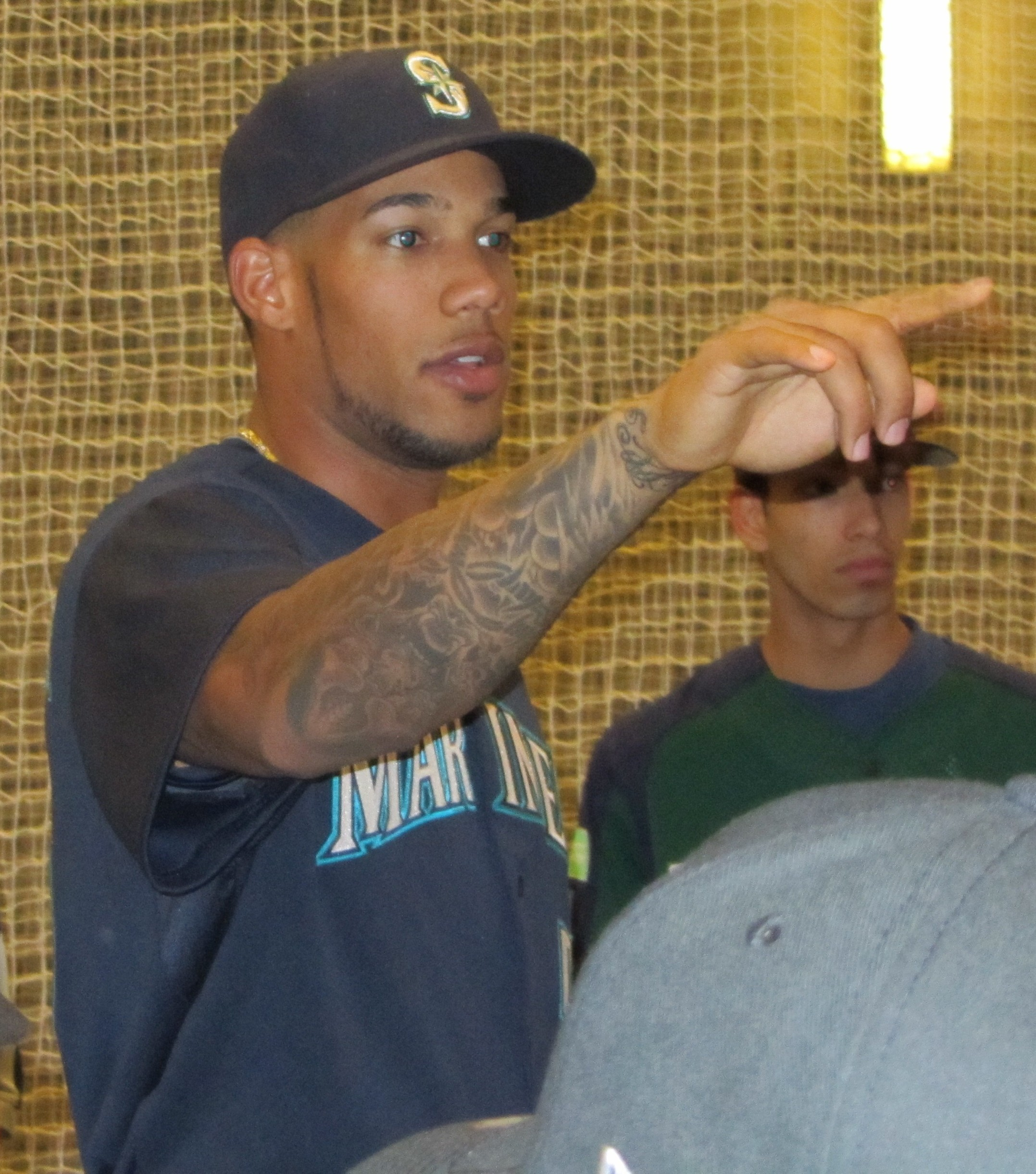
- Halman with the Seattle Mariners in 2010
- Outfielder
- Born: August 26, 1987; Haarlem, Netherlands
- Died: November 21, 2011 (aged 24); Rotterdam, Netherlands
- Batted: Right Threw: Right

MLB debut
- September 23, 2010, for the Seattle Mariners

Last MLB appearance
- August 3, 2011, for the Seattle Mariners

MLB statistics
- Batting average: .207
- Home runs: 2
- Runs batted in: 9
- Stats at Baseball Reference

Teams
- Seattle Mariners (2010–2011)
Medals
Men's baseball
Representing Netherlands
European Baseball Championship
Gold medal – first place	2007 Spain	National team

Gregory Anthony Halman (August 26, 1987 – November 21, 2011) was a Dutch professional baseball outfielder. He played with the Seattle Mariners of Major League Baseball (MLB) in 2010 and 2011. He played for the Netherlands national team in the 2009 World Baseball Classic and other international tournaments. He died in Rotterdam in November 2011 after being stabbed at the home of his younger brother, Jason Halman, who was arrested in connection with the stabbing then acquitted on the grounds of temporary insanity.

== Playing career ==
=== The Netherlands ===
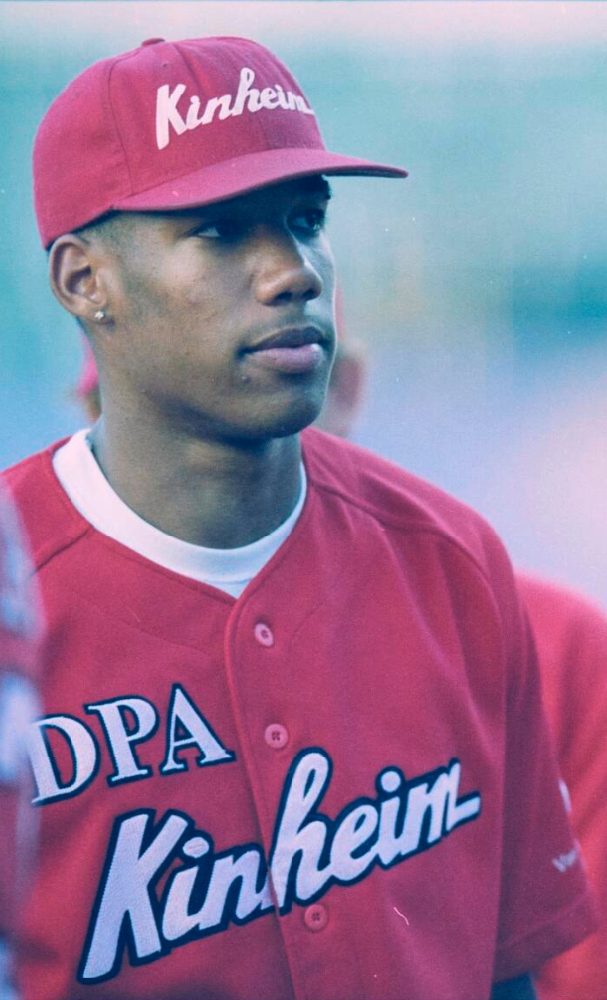
Halman with Kinheim in 2003

Halman, like his father Eddy Halman and younger brother Jason, played professional baseball in the Netherlands and on the Netherlands national team. Halman debuted when he was 16 years old with the Dutch Honkbal Hoofdklasse team Kinheim in Haarlem in 2003. That season, he led the league with six triples. The next year, Halman was one of the best players in the country, batting .358 with a league-leading 4 home runs, 4 triples, and 41 runs batted in (RBIs). He hit for the cycle in a May game against Sparta-Feyenoord. He won the league's most valuable player award and was named the most promising young Dutch player. He primarily played first base in 2004. His strong play drew the notice of American baseball scouts.

Halman was named to the Netherlands' provisional roster ahead of the 2006 World Baseball Classic (WBC) but was not selected for the final team. He played six games, starting three, for the Dutch national team in the 2007 European Baseball Championship. He hit .357 with one stolen base. He helped the Netherlands go undefeated to win the European title and qualify for the 2008 Summer Olympics and 2009 WBC. He also played in the 2007 Baseball World Cup, batting .214 with 3 RBI in seven games.

In the 2009 WBC, Halman hit .091 with one double and nine strikeouts in 11 at bats in four games. The Dutch team made a surprising run to the second round of the tournament but finished with a 2–4 record.

=== Minor League Baseball ===
Halman signed with the Minnesota Twins on November 21, 2003, but his contract was voided on April 1, 2004. He signed with the Seattle Mariners on June 26, 2004 for $130,000. He participated in the Arizona Instructional League that fall. In 2005, he made his American debut, playing 26 games with the Rookie-level Arizona League Mariners. He played all three outfield positions. He recorded a season-high three RBIs on July 9. He went 4-for-5 with a run and first home run in America on July 10. Halman hit .438 against lefties, compared to .219 against right-handed pitchers. After the season, he again participated in the Arizona Instructional League.

In 2006, he hit .259 with 5 home runs and 15 RBI in 28 games for the Class-A Short Season Everett AquaSox. He was third on the team with 10 stolen bases. He had a 12-game hitting streak from June 21 to July 4. He had season-high three hits on July 19. However, he suffered a season-ending injury, fracturing his right hand after throwing a punch during a bench-clearing brawl in July.

Halman started 2007 with the Single-A Wisconsin Timber Rattlers but batted only .182 in 52 games and was demoted to Everett in mid-June. With the AquaSox, he hit .307 with 16 home runs and 16 stolen bases in 62 games. He was named to the Class-A Short Season and Northwest League All-Star teams and was also named the Class-A Short Season Player of the Year. With both Wisconsin and Everett, Halman was teammates with fellow Dutch player Kalian Sams.

Halman was promoted to the High-A High Desert Mavericks to start 2008. After batting .269 with 19 home runs and 53 RBI in 67 games, he was promoted to the Double-A West Tenn Diamond Jaxx on June 17, where he hit another 10 home runs. He ended the season with a combined 29 home runs and 31 stolen bases. He was named the Mariners' Minor League Player of the Year. After the regular season, he returned to the Netherlands to play four games with Kinheim, going 4-for-11 with three doubles and two sacrifice flies. He also played for the Peoria Javelinas in the Arizona Fall League, batting only .217 with three home runs in 21 games.

Halman returned to Double-A in 2009, but his performance dipped. His .210 average, .278 on-base percentage, and 183 strikeouts were the worst in the Southern League, though he tied for the league lead with 25 home runs in 121 games. He was named to the league's All-Star team. He was hit by 15 pitches, more than three times as many as he had in any other season. He missed two weeks in June with a bruised heel.

Halman was promoted to the Triple-A Tacoma Rainiers at the start of the 2010 season. He hit .243 and led the team with 33 home runs, 80 RBI, 15 stolen bases, and 169 strikeouts. Halman and the Rainiers won the 2010 Pacific Coast League championship.

=== Major League Baseball ===
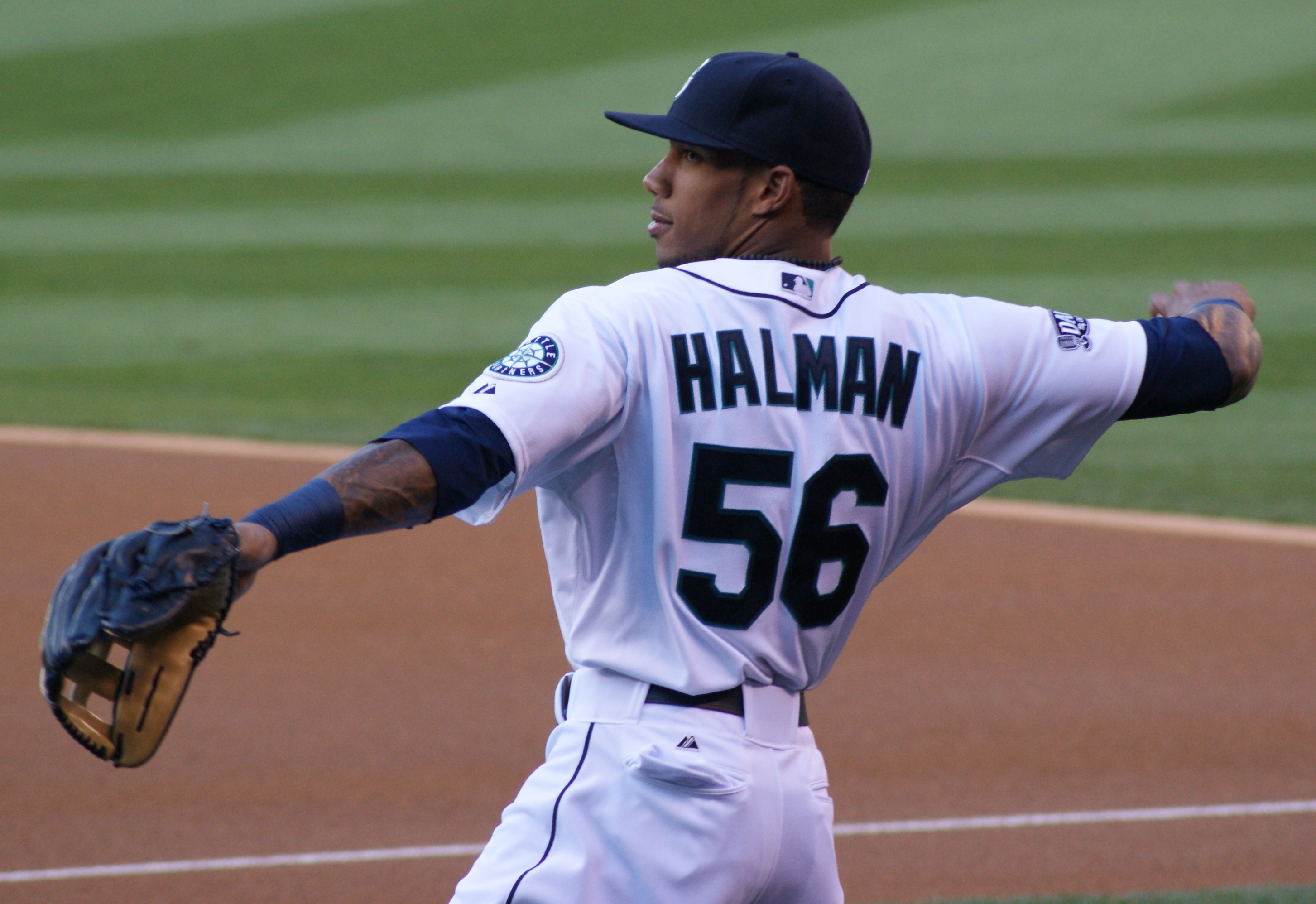
Halman with the Mariners in 2011

On September 22, 2010, Halman and three teammates were called up to the Seattle Mariners after Tacoma's title run. He played in his first MLB game on September 23, starting in center field. After making outs in his first nine at bats, he hit a double off C.J. Wilson of the Texas Rangers, on September 27 for his first major league hit. He played in nine of the Mariners' final 11 games, batting .138 with 11 strikeouts and one walk in 30 plate appearances.

Halman started the 2011 season back in Tacoma. On June 3, he rejoined the Mariners, replacing struggling outfielder Michael Saunders, who was sent down to Triple-A. Halman had three hits in his first two games with the Mariners. Halman hit his first MLB home run on June 15 in a 3–1 victory over the Los Angeles Angels. His last MLB hit was his second home run, off Brett Cecil of the Toronto Blue Jays on July 19. He played his final game with the Mariners on August 3 against the Oakland Athletics, striking out a career-high three times. The next day, he was optioned back to Tacoma, after going hitless in 19 consecutive plate appearances. His final MLB season ended with a .230 batting average. He struck out in one third of his plate appearances. He hit better in Tacoma, batting .299 with a .358 on-base percentage, both career highs in the U.S., with 3 home runs in 40 games. In his final minor league game, Halman hit three singles and scored twice against the Fresno Grizzlies on September 5.

== Personal life ==
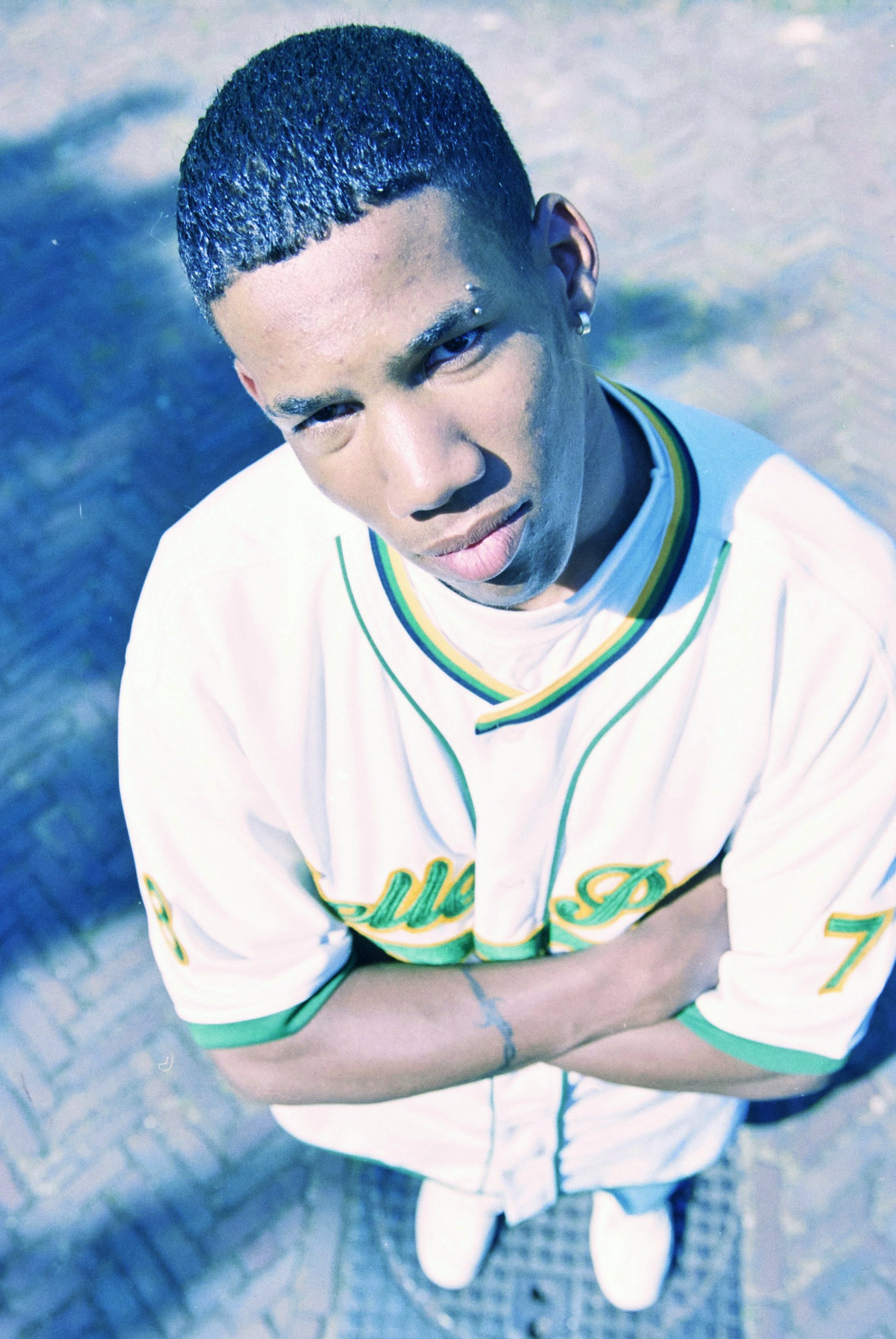
Halman in 2003

Halman spoke Dutch, English, Spanish, and Papiamento. He grew up speaking Dutch and English and learned Spanish in 2005, his first year in the U.S. He graduated from high school at Mendel College in Haarlem in June 2004.

Halman came from an athletic family. In addition to his brother and father playing baseball for the Netherlands, his older sister, Naomi Halman, played on the Dutch national basketball team and in European leagues. His younger sister played several seasons in the top Dutch softball league. His mother also played softball.

Halman began playing baseball with his father when he was three years old. He played on Dutch youth teams with Kalian Sams and Rick van den Hurk.

== Death ==
On November 21, 2011, Halman died of blood loss in Rotterdam from a laceration to his carotid artery. He was 24 years old. His brother, Jason Halman, was arrested for Greg's death. Reportedly, Greg approached Jason about loud music, which resulted in an argument and then a stabbing. Halman was the second former MLB player known to have died in the Netherlands.

Halman, wearing his Mariners uniform, was buried in Westerveld Cemetery in Driehuis on November 29. Thousands of people, including several former Mariners teammates, attended his funeral and burial. His family chose a burial plot in a small grove near the North Sea that reminded them of a baseball diamond. The Everett AquaSox retired Halman's number 26 on June 23, 2012. Kinheim also retired his number 26.

On August 16, 2012, Dutch authorities released Jason Halman from custody, after prosecutors agreed with his attorneys that Jason had been suffering from psychosis at the time of the stabbing, induced in part by his cannabis use. Jason agreed to supervision by a probation officer and to undergo mental health treatment. On August 30, 2012, a Dutch court formally acquitted Jason due to temporary insanity. The court freed him, stating that his psychiatric and psychological assessments found that there was only a small chance of reoccurrence. Jason later returned to play baseball for the Netherlands national team.

== See also ==
- List of baseball players who died during their careers
