= CBV Binnenland =

- Leagues: Promotiedivisie (men's); VBL (women's)
- Founded: 18 June 1968; 56 years ago
- Arena: De Driesprong
- Capacity: 300
- Location: Barendrecht, Netherlands
- President: Wim van der Hoek
- Website: cbvbinnenland.nl
Home

CBV Binnenland is a Dutch basketball club based in Barendrecht. Its women's team plays in the national first tier Vrouwen Basketball League (VBL). The men's team plays in the national second tier Promotiedivisie.

== Honours ==
=== Women's team ===
Vrouwen Basketball League

- Champions (1): 2013–14

NBB Cup

- Champions (3): 2004, 2014, 2015

Supercup

- Champions (2): 2015, 2018

WBL Final Four

- Champions (6): 2001, 2002, 2005, 2011, 2013, 2014

=== Men's team ===
Promotiedivisie

- Champions (1): 2010–11

== Notable players ==
- (Netherlands) Natalie van den Adel (5 seasons: '06-'08, '10-'12, '13)
