= Landslake Lions =

- Leagues: 1e divisie (men's); Vrouwen Basketball League (women's)
- Founded: 1972; 54 years ago
- Arena: ICL Sportcenter
- Capacity: 900
- Location: Landsmeer, North Holland, Netherlands
- Championships: 1 Promotiedivisie
- Website: lionsbasketball.nl
Home	Away

Landslake Lions is a Dutch basketball club based in Landsmeer, North Holland. The men's team currently plays in the 1e divisie, the third tier of basketball in the Netherlands. The women's team plays in the Vrouwen Basketball League, the Dutch first tier. The Lions play their game at the ICL Sportcenter, which has a capacity of 900 people.

== Honours ==
=== Men ===
- Promotiedivisie
  - Winners (1): 2016–17

=== Women ===
- Vrouwen Basketball League
  - Winners (6): 2001, 2007, 2010, 2012, 2013, 2016

== Season by season ==
=== Men's team ===
Season	Tier	League	Pos.	NBB Cup
2014–15	2	Promotiedivisie	8th	
2015–16	2	Promotiedivisie	8th	
2016–17	2	Promotiedivisie	Champion	Fourth round
2017–18	2	Promotiedivisie	13th	
2018–22	Inactivity			
2022–23	4	2e divisie	5th	
2023–24	4	2e divisie	7th	
2024–25	3	1e divisie	Runner-up	
2025–26	3	1e divisie	3rd	
2026–27	3	1e divisie		Preliminary round

== Notable players ==
Note: Flags indicate national team eligibility at FIBA-sanctioned events. Players may hold other non-FIBA nationalities not displayed.

Criteria

To appear in this section a player must have either:

- Set a club record or won an individual award while at the club
- Played at least one official international match for their national team at any time
- Played at least one official NBA match at any time.

=== Men's ===
- (Netherlands) Berend Weijs
- (Syria) Michael Madanly
- (Netherlands) Nino Gorissen
