= Den Helder Suns (women) =

- Leagues: Women's Basketball League
- Founded: 1983; 42 years ago
- Arena: Sporthal Sportlaan
- Location: Den Helder, Netherlands
- Head coach: Mario Bennes
- 2021–22 position: WBL, 1st of 9
- Website: denhelderbasketball.nl
| Home | Away | Third |

BV Den Helder, also known as Den Helder Suns, is a Dutch women's basketball club based in Den Helder. Established in 1983, it plays in the Women's Basketball League (WBL). The club has won sixteen national championships.

== History ==
The club was founded in 1983. Before, there was a team as part of BV Noordkop, however the ladies team decided to establish a separate club to further its ambitions. Since then, the team has played in the Dames Eredivisie.

Since the 2021–22 season, the team plays as Den Helder Suns, adopting the same name as the men's professional team from Den Helder. The organisations stayed separated from each other.

== Honours ==
Women's Basketball League

- Champions (16): 1985, 1988–1991, 1996, 1998–2000, 2004–2006, 2008, 2009, 2021, 2022

NBB Cup

- Champions (8): 1992, 1993, 1997, 1998, 1999, 2007, 2020, 2023

WBL Final Four

- Champions (7): 1995, 1996, 1998, 1999, 2001, 2004, 2008

== Players ==
=== Current roster ===
Den Helder Suns roster
Players
Coaches

| Pos. | No. | Nat. | Name | Ht. |
|---|---|---|---|---|
| F | 3 | (Netherlands) | van Linge, Mecx | 1.85 m (6 ft 1 in) |
| G | 4 | (Netherlands) | Kopra, Shelaney | 1.60 m (5 ft 3 in) |
| PG | 6 | (Netherlands) | Plagmeijer, Leonie | 1.72 m (5 ft 8 in) |
| G | 8 | (Netherlands) | Lewakabessy, Amber | 1.71 m (5 ft 7 in) |
| C | 10 | (Netherlands) | Toornstra, Lotte | 1.86 m (6 ft 1 in) |
| G | 11 | (Netherlands) | Lewakabessy, Noa | 1.70 m (5 ft 7 in) |
| G | 16 | (Netherlands) | van Es, Priscilla | 1.78 m (5 ft 10 in) |
| G | | (Netherlands) | Karreman, Joa |
| | | (United States) | Biggott, Brooke |
| | | (United States) | Smith, Morgan |

Head coach

- (Netherlands) Mario Bennes

Assistant coach(es)

- (Netherlands) Femke Slim

Team manager

- (Netherlands) Yngwie van der Velden

Legend

- (C) Team captain
- (DP) Development player
- (I) Import player
- Injured

- Roster
Updated: October 9, 2023

Note: Flags indicate national team eligibility at FIBA-sanctioned events. Players may hold other non-FIBA nationalities not displayed.

=== Notable players ===
Criteria

To appear in this section a player must have either:

- Played at least three seasons for the club.
- Set a club record or won an individual award while at the club.
- Played at least one official international match for their national team at any time.
- Played at least one official WNBA match at any time.

- (Iceland) Alda Leif Jónsdóttir
