= Grasshoppers (basketball club) =

- Leagues: Eerste divisie (men's); Vrouwen Basketball League (women's)
- Founded: 21 December 1971; 54 years ago
- Arena: Cleijn Duin
- Capacity: 450
- Location: Katwijk, Netherlands
- President: John Spaan
- Website: grasshoppers.nl
Home	Away

Grasshoppers Katwijk, better known as simply Grasshoppers, is a Dutch basketball club based in Katwijk. Its women's team plays in the Vrouwen Basketball League (VBL), the domestic first tier. Its men's team plays in the eerste divisie, the domestic third tier. Established in 1971, the team plays its home games at Cleijn Duin.

== Honours ==
=== Women's ===
- Vrouwen Basketball League
  - Winners (2): 2017–18, 2018–19
- NBB Cup
  - Winners (4): 1983, 1994 1995, 2018
- Supercup
  - Winners (1): 2018

=== Men's ===
- Promotiedivisie
  - Runners-up (3): 2017, 2018, 2019

== European record ==
Women's team

Season	Competition	Round	Club	Home	Away	Agg
1991–92	Ronchetti Cup	R32	(France) Mirande	39–68	47–101	86–187

Notes

1. Grasshoppers points are listed first.

== Notable players ==
Note: Flags indicate national team eligibility at FIBA-sanctioned events. Players may hold other non-FIBA nationalities not displayed.

Criteria

To appear in this section a player must have either:

- Set a club record or won an individual award while at the club
- Played at least one official international match for their national team at any time
- Played at least one official NBA match at any time.

Women's team

- (Netherlands) Natalie van den Adel (1 season: 2012–13)

== Season by season ==
=== Men's team ===
Season	Tier	League	Pos.	NBB Cup
2015-16	2	Promotiedivisie	3rd	Quarterfinals
2016-17	2	Promotiedivisie	Runner-up	Fourth round
2017-18	2	Promotiedivisie	Runner-up	Quarterfinals
2018-19	2	Promotiedivisie	Runner-up	Fourth round
2019–20	Seasons cancelled due to the COVID-19 pandemic			
2020–21	Seasons cancelled due to the COVID-19 pandemic			
2021-22	2	Promotiedivisie	8th	
2022-23	2	Promotiedivisie	11th	Second round
2023-24	2	Promotiedivisie	12th	First round
2024-25	3	Eerste divisie	4th	
2025-26	3	Eerste divisie	4th	
2026–27	3	Eerste divisie		

=== Women's team ===
Key
Playoff berth

Season	Tier	League	Regular season					Playoffs	Dutch Cup	Head coach
Season	Tier	League	Finish	Played	Wins	Losses	Win%	Playoffs	Dutch Cup	Head coach
Grasshoppers
2018–19	1	VBL	1st*	18	17	1	.944	Champions		
2019–20	1	VBL	1st*	26	23	3	.885	N/A		Axel Gouw
2020–21	1	WBL	4th*	16	11	5	.688	Semifinalist		
