= Jolly Jumpers =

Dutch basketball club

- Leagues: Women's Basketball League
- Founded: 1969
- History: Jolly Jumpers; 1969–present
- Arena: Sportcentrum De Vlaskoel
- Location: Tubbergen, Netherlands
- Chairman: Mary Kerssen
- Head coach: Chris Stomp
- Championships: 1 Dutch League; 3 Dutch Cups; 1 Dutch Second Division
- Website: www.jollyjumpersbasketbal.nl
Home	Away

Jolly Jumpers is a Dutch professional women's basketball team based in Tubbergen. The team plays in the Women's Basketball League (WBL), the country's premier league. The club has won one national championship, in 2002.

== History ==
The club was founded in 1969 by the gymnastics teacher Gé Westgeest. While the club started as a team for college students, the team played in the Eredivisie as soon as in 1975. In 2002, the Jumpers won their first national championship.

== Honours ==
Women's Basketball League

- Champions (1): 2001–02

Carla de Liefde Trophy

- Winners (3): 2001, 2003, 2005

Promotiedivisie

- Winners (1): 2016–17
