= UBSC Wien =

Austrian basketball club

Union Basket Sport Club Wien was a professional basketball club based in Vienna, Austria. UBSC was one of the major clubs of Austrian basketball League in the post-World War II era, mainly in the seventies where the club won eight national championships and seven consecutive titles.

== Honours & achievements ==
Austrian League

- Winners (11): 1970–71, 1971–72, 1972–73, 1973–74, 1974–75, 1975–76, 1976–77, 1978–79, 1979–80, 1980–81, 1981–82
