= Batouwe Basketball =

Batouwe
- Leagues: Promotiedivisie (Men); WBL (Women)
- Founded: 1975; 51 years ago
- Arena: De Schaapskooi
- Capacity: 650
- Location: Bemmel, Netherlands
- Website: www.batouwebasketball.nl
Home

Batouwe Basketball is a Dutch basketball club based in Bemmel. Its women's team separated in 2010 to play as Lecdetec.nl Women's Basketball League. The women won the national championship two times, in 2015 and 2017. The men's team plays in the Promotiedivisie as Dreamfield Dolphins.

== See also ==
- Lecdetec.nl Bemmel
