= Women's Basketball League (Netherlands) =

Women's basketball league in the Netherlands

- Organising body: Basketball Nederland
- Founded: 1949; 77 years ago
- First season: 1949–50
- Country: Netherlands
- Confederation: FIBA Europe (Europe)
- Number of teams: 9
- Level on pyramid: 1
- Relegation to: Promotiedivisie
- Domestic cup(s): Carla de Liefde Trophy; WBL Final Four
- Supercup: Supercup
- International cup: EuroCup Women
- Current champions: Grasshoppers (4th title) (2023–24)
- Most championships: Blue Stars (20 titles)
- 2024–25 Dutch Women's Basketball League

The Women's Basketball League (WBL) is the highest level of women's basketball in the Netherlands. The first season was played in 1949. Blue Stars is the record titleholder of the league with twenty won championships. The league consists of 10 teams as of August 2024.

== History ==
From its establishment, the league was known as "Eredivisie".

Former logo of the league, when it was the VBL

In 2019, the league name was changed from Vrouwen Basketball League (VBL) to Women's Basketball League (WBL). The 2019–20 season was cancelled prematurely because of the COVID-19 pandemic, the first time the competition was not played out. No champion was named.

== 2021–22 clubs ==
Location of teams in the 2021–22 WBL season

The league currently consists of 9 teams. In the 2022–23 season, BAL will enter the league as its tenth team.

Note: Table lists in alphabetical order.

Club	Location	Venue	Capacity
Batouwe	Bemmel	De Kooi	650
Binnenland	Barendrecht	De Driesprong	300
Utrecht Cangeroes	Utrecht	Sporthal Lunetten	
Den Helder Suns	Den Helder	Sporthal Sportlaan	1,000
Grasshoppers	Katwijk	Cleijn Duijn	450
Jolly Jumpers	Tubbergen	De Vlaskoel	
Landslake Lions	Landsmeer	ICL Sportcenter	900
Martini Sparks	Haren	Scharlakenhof	
Triple Threat	Haarlem	Van Hogendorphal	

== List of champions ==
- 1950 Westerkwartier Amsterdam
- 1951 Blue Stars
- 1952 Blue Stars
- 1953 Blue Stars
- 1954 Blue Stars
- 1955 Blue Stars
- 1956 Blue Stars
- 1957 Blue Stars
- 1958 Blue Stars
- 1959 Blue Stars
- 1960 Landlust
- 1961 AMVJ Amsterdam
- 1962 Blue Stars
- 1963 Blue Stars
- 1964 Blue Stars
- 1965 AMVJ Amsterdam
- 1966 Blue Stars
- 1967 AMVJ Amsterdam
- 1968 AMVJ Amsterdam
- 1969 Blue Stars
- 1970 AMVJ Amsterdam
- 1971 Blue Stars
- 1972 Blue Stars
- 1973 Blue Stars
- 1974 Blue Stars
- 1975 Blue Stars
- 1976 Blue Stars
- 1977 RZ
- 1978 RZ
- 1979 BOB Oud-Beijerland
- 1980 Landlust
- 1981 Landlust
- 1982 BV Amstelveen
- 1983 BV Amstelveen
- 1984 BV Amstelveen
- 1985 Den Helder
- 1986 Canadians
- 1987 Hoofddorp
- 1988 Den Helder
- 1989 Den Helder
- 1990 Den Helder
- 1991 Den Helder
- 1992 Voorburg
- 1993 Tonego
- 1994 Tonego
- 1995 Tonego
- 1996 Den Helder
- 1997 Lieshout
- 1998 Den Helder
- 1999 Den Helder
- 2000 Den Helder
- 2001 Landslake Lions
- 2002 Jolly Jumpers
- 2003 Lely
- 2004 Den Helder
- 2005 Den Helder
- 2006 Den Helder
- 2007 Landslake Lions
- 2008 Den Helder
- 2009 Den Helder
- 2010 Landslake Lions
- 2011 Leiderdorp
- 2012 Landslake Lions
- 2013 Landslake Lions
- 2014 Binnenland
- 2015 Batouwe
- 2016 Landslake Lions
- 2017 Batouwe
- 2018 Grasshoppers
- 2019 Grasshoppers
- 2020 None
- 2021 Den Helder
- 2022 Den Helder
- 2023 Grasshoppers
- 2024 Grasshoppers

== Performance by team ==
Teams in bold are still active in the VBL.

Club	Winners	Years won
Blue Stars	20	1951–1959, 1962–1964, 1966, 1969, 1971–1976,
Den Helder	16	1985, 1988–1991, 1996, 1998–2000, 2004–2006, 2008, 2009, 2021, 2022
Landslake Lions	6	2001, 2007, 2010, 2012, 2013, 2016
AMVJ	4	1961, 1965, 1967, 1968
Canadians	4	1960, 1980, 1981, 1986
Grasshoppers	4	2018, 2019, 2023, 2024
Tonego	3	1993–1995
Batouwe	2	2015, 2017
RZ	2	1977, 1978
Lieshout	1	1997
BOB Oud-Beijerland	1	1979
Hoofddorp	1	1987
Lely	1	2003
Voorburg	1	1992
Leiderdorp	1	2011
Jolly Jumpers	1	2002
