= Augusto Binelli =

Italian basketball player and coach

Personal information
- Born: 23 September 1964 (age 62) Carrara, Italy
- Listed height: 2.15 m (7 ft 0.75 in)
- Listed weight: 118 kg (260 lb)

Career information
- High school: Long Island Lutheran (Brookville, New York)
- NBA draft: 1986: 2nd round, 40th overall pick
- Drafted by: Atlanta Hawks
- Playing career: 1983–2010
- Position: Center
- Coaching career: 2011–2013

Career history

Playing
- 1983–2000: Virtus Bologna
- 2000–2001: Progresso Castelmaggiore
- 2001–2002: Sutor Montegranaro
- 2002–2004: Trapani
- 2004–2007: Benedetto XIV Cento
- 2007–2009: Anzola
- 2009–2010: Salus Bologna

Coaching
- 2011–2013: Anzola

Career highlights
- As player: EuroLeague champion (1998); 2× FIBA European Selection (1995, 1996); FIBA Saporta Cup champion (1990); 5× Italian League champion (1984, 1993–1995, 1998); 5× Italian Cup winner (1984, 1989, 1990, 1997, 1999); Italian Supercup winner (1995)
- Stats at Basketball Reference
Medals
Men's basketball
Representing Italy
EuroBasket
Bronze medal – third place	1985 West Germany

Augusto "Gus" Binelli (born 23 September 1964) is an Italian former professional basketball player and coach. At a height of 2.15 m (7 ft 0.75 in) tall, and a weight of 118 kg (260 lb), he played at the center position. Binelli was drafted in the second round, of the 1986 NBA draft, by the Atlanta Hawks, though he never played in the NBA. The Hawks still own his draft rights, as of December 2024.

== Professional career ==
Binelli played with the senior men's team of Virtus Bologna from 1980 to 2000. With Virtus Bologna, he won 5 Italian League championships (1984, 1993, 1994, 1995, 1998), 5 Italian Cups (1984, 1989, 1990, 1997, 1999), the EuroLeague championship (1998), and the FIBA European Cup Cup Winner's Cup (FIBA Saporta Cup) (1990). He was also a 2-time McDonald's Open finalist (1993, 1995).

He was a member of the FIBA European Selection team in 1995 and 1996.

== National team career ==
Binelli played with the senior Italy national basketball team at the EuroBasket 1985, where he won a bronze medal. He also played at the 1986 FIBA World Championship and at the EuroBasket 1989.

== Awards and Accomplishments ==
=== Clubs ===
- 5× Italian League Champion: (1984, 1993, 1994, 1995, 1998)
- 5× Italian Cup Winner: (1984, 1989, 1990, 1997, 1999)
- FIBA European Cup Winners' Cup (FIBA Saporta Cup) Champion: (1990)
- Italian Supercup Winner: (1995)
- 2× FIBA European Selection: (1995, 1996)
- EuroLeague Champion: (1998)

=== Italian senior national team ===
- 1985 EuroBasket: Bronze
