= Limoges CSP in international competitions =

Limoges CSP history and statistics in FIBA Europe and Euroleague Basketball (company) competitions.

FIBA Korać Cup	FIBA Korać Cup	FIBA Korać Cup	FIBA European Cup Winners' Cup	FIBA European Champions Cup
(Italy); Padua; Palasport San Lazzaro 1982	(West Germany); West Berlin; Deutschlandhalle 1983	(France); Limoges; Palais des Sports de Beaublanc Runners-up 1987	(France); Grenoble; Palais des Sports 1988	(Spain); Zaragoza; Pabellón Príncipe Felipe 3rd place 1990

McDonald's Open	FIBA European League	FIBA Korać Cup		
(France); Paris; Palais Omnisports de Paris-Bercy 3rd place 1991	(Greece); Piraeus; Peace and Friendship Stadium 1993	(Spain); Málaga; Pabellón Ciudad Jardín 2000	N/A	N/A

== 1980s ==
=== 1981–82 FIBA Korać Cup, 3rd–tier ===
The 1981–82 FIBA Korać Cup was the 11th installment of the European 3rd-tier level professional basketball club competition FIBA Korać Cup, running from October 7, 1981, to March 18, 1982. The trophy was won by Limoges CSP, who defeated Šibenka by a result of 90–84 at Palasport San Lazzaro in Padua, Italy. Overall, Limoges CSP achieved in present competition a record of 9 wins against 4 defeats, in five successive rounds. More detailed:

==== First round ====
- Tie played on October 7, 1981, and on October 14, 1981.

Team 1	Agg.	Team 2	1st leg	2nd leg
T71 Dudelange (Luxembourg)	139–200	(France) Limoges CSP	83–92	56–108

==== Second round ====
- Tie played on November 4, 1981, and on November 11, 1981.

Team 1	Agg.	Team 2	1st leg	2nd leg
Limoges CSP (France)	183–165	(Greece) Aris	106–77	77–88

==== Top 16 ====
- Day 1 (December 9, 1981)

Team 1	Score	Team 2
Limoges CSP (France)	76–69	(Soviet Union) Spartak Leningrad

- Day 2 (December 16, 1981)

Team 1	Score	Team 2
Cotonificio (Spain)	93–89	(France) Limoges CSP

- Day 3 (January 13, 1982)

Team 1	Score	Team 2
Limoges CSP (France)	105–101	(Italy) Carrera Venezia

- Day 4 (January 20, 1982)

Team 1	Score	Team 2
Spartak Leningrad (Soviet Union)	89–106	(France) Limoges CSP

- Day 5 (January 27, 1982)

Team 1	Score	Team 2
Limoges CSP (France)	101–90	(Spain) Cotonificio

- Day 6 (February 3, 1982)

Team 1	Score	Team 2
Carrera Venezia (Italy)	107–84	(France) Limoges CSP

- Group A standings:

Pos.	Team	Pld.	Pts.	W	L	PF	PA	PD	Tie-break
1.	(France) Limoges CSP	6	10	4	2	561	549	+12	1–1 (+7)
2.	(Spain) Cotonificio	6	10	4	2	579	554	+25	1–1 (-7)
3.	(Italy) Carrera Venezia	6	9	3	3	587	563	+24	
4.	(Soviet Union) Spartak Leningrad	6	7	1	5	498	559	-61	

==== Semifinals ====
- Tie played on February 17, 1982, and on February 24, 1982.

Team 1	Agg.	Team 2	1st leg	2nd leg
Zadar (Socialist Federal Republic of Yugoslavia)	170–183	(France) Limoges CSP	92–84	78–99

==== Final ====
- March 18, 1982, at Palasport San Lazzaro in Padua, Italy.

Team 1	Score	Team 2
Limoges CSP (France)	90–84	(Socialist Federal Republic of Yugoslavia) Šibenka

=== 1982–83 FIBA Korać Cup, 3rd–tier ===
The 1982–83 FIBA Korać Cup was the 12th installment of the European 3rd-tier level professional basketball club competition FIBA Korać Cup, running from October 6, 1982, to March 8, 1983. The trophy was won by the title holder Limoges CSP, who defeated -for second consecutive time- Šibenka by a result of 94–86 at Deutschlandhalle in West Berlin, West Germany. Overall, Limoges CSP achieved in present competition a record of 7 wins against 2 defeats, in five successive rounds. More detailed:

==== First round ====
- Bye

==== Second round ====
- Bye

==== Top 16 ====
- Day 1 (December 8, 1982)

Team 1	Score	Team 2
Limoges CSP (France)	80–78	(Socialist Federal Republic of Yugoslavia) Crvena zvezda

- Day 2 (December 15, 1982)

Team 1	Score	Team 2
Nová huť Ostrava (Czechoslovakia)	76–89	(France) Limoges CSP

- Day 3 (January 12, 1983)

Team 1	Score	Team 2
Limoges CSP (France)	87–80	(Italy) Banco di Roma

- Day 4 (January 19, 1983)

Team 1	Score	Team 2
Crvena zvezda (Socialist Federal Republic of Yugoslavia)	93–83	(France) Limoges CSP

- Day 5 (January 26, 1983)

Team 1	Score	Team 2
Limoges CSP (France)	90–82	(Czechoslovakia) Nová huť Ostrava

- Day 6 (February 2, 1983)

Team 1	Score	Team 2
Banco di Roma (Italy)	73–74	(France) Limoges CSP

- Group A standings:

Pos.	Team	Pld.	Pts.	W	L	PF	PA	PD
1.	(France) Limoges CSP	6	11	5	1	503	482	+21
2.	(Italy) Banco di Roma	6	10	4	2	519	472	+47
3.	(Socialist Federal Republic of Yugoslavia) Crvena zvezda	6	9	3	3	528	509	+19
4.	(Czechoslovakia) Nová huť Ostrava	6	6	0	6	445	532	-87

==== Semifinals ====
- Tie played on February 16, 1983, and on February 23, 1983.

Team 1	Agg.	Team 2	1st leg	2nd leg
Dynamo Moscow (Soviet Union)	172–178	(France) Limoges CSP	93–86	79–92

==== Final ====
- March 8, 1983, at Deutschlandhalle in West Berlin, West Germany.

Team 1	Score	Team 2
Šibenka (Socialist Federal Republic of Yugoslavia)	86–94	(France) Limoges CSP

=== 1983–84 FIBA European Champions Cup, 1st–tier ===
The 1980–81 FIBA European Champions Cup was the 27th installment of the European top-tier level professional basketball club competition FIBA European Champions Cup (now called EuroLeague), running from September 15, 1983, to March 29, 1984. The trophy was won by Banco di Roma, who defeated FC Barcelona by a result of 79–73 at Patinoire des Vernets in Geneva, Switzerland. Overall, Limoges CSP achieved in the present competition a record of 5 wins against 9 defeats, in four successive rounds. More detailed:

==== First round ====
- Bye

==== Second round ====
- Tie played on September 29, 1983, and on October 6, 1983.

Team 1	Agg.	Team 2	1st leg	2nd leg
Dinamo București (Romania)	148-176	(France) Limoges CSP	83–97	65–79

==== Top 12 ====
- Tie played on October 27, 1983, and on November 3, 1983.

Team 1	Agg.	Team 2	1st leg	2nd leg
Nashua EBBC (Netherlands)	149-167	(France) Limoges CSP	70–69	79–98

==== Semifinals ====
- Day 1 (December 8, 1983)

Team 1	Score	Team 2
Limoges CSP (France)	74–76	(Italy) Banco di Roma

- Day 2 (December 15, 1983)

Team 1	Score	Team 2
Maccabi Tel Aviv (Israel)	95–104	(France) Limoges CSP

- Day 3 (January 11, 1984)

Team 1	Score	Team 2
Limoges CSP (France)	80–98	(Spain) FC Barcelona

- Day 4 (January 18, 1984)

Team 1	Score	Team 2
Bosna (Socialist Federal Republic of Yugoslavia)	104–96	(France) Limoges CSP

- Day 5 (January 25, 1984)

Team 1	Score	Team 2
Limoges CSP (France)	108–118*	(Italy) Jollycolombani Cantù

^{*}Two overtimes at the end of regulation (97–97 and 107–107).

- Day 6 (February 2, 1984)

Team 1	Score	Team 2
Banco di Roma (Italy)	81–76	(France) Limoges CSP

- Day 7 (February 16, 1984)

Team 1	Score	Team 2
Limoges CSP (France)	105–111*	(Israel) Maccabi Tel Aviv

^{*}Two overtimes at the end of regulation (86–86 and 98–98).

- Day 8 (February 23, 1984)

Team 1	Score	Team 2
FC Barcelona (Spain)	113–94	(France) Limoges CSP

- Day 9 (February 29, 1984)

Team 1	Score	Team 2
Limoges CSP (France)	107–88	(Socialist Federal Republic of Yugoslavia) Bosna

- Day 10 (March 8, 1984)

Team 1	Score	Team 2
Jollycolombani Cantù (Italy)	95–93	(France) Limoges CSP

- Semifinals group stage standings:

Pos.	Team	Pld.	Pts.	W	L	PF	PA	PD	Tie-break
1.	(Spain) FC Barcelona	10	17	7	3	910	825	+85	1–1 (+4)
2.	(Italy) Banco di Roma	10	17	7	3	785	+752	+33	1–1 (-4)
3.	(Italy) Jollycolombani Cantù	10	16	6	4	865	826	+39	
4.	(Socialist Federal Republic of Yugoslavia) Bosna	10	15	5	5	843	928	-85	
5.	(Israel) Maccabi Tel Aviv	10	13	3	7	872	902	-30	
6.	(France) Limoges CSP	10	12	2	8	937	979	-42	

=== 1984–85 FIBA European Champions Cup, 1st–tier ===
The 1984–85 FIBA European Champions Cup was the 28th installment of the European top-tier level professional basketball club competition FIBA European Champions Cup (now called EuroLeague), running from September 21, 1984, to April 3, 1985. The trophy was won by Cibona, who defeated Real Madrid by a result of 87–78 at Peace and Friendship Stadium in Piraeus, Greece. Overall, Limoges CSP achieved in the present competition a record of 2 wins against 2 defeats, in three successive rounds. More detailed:

==== First round ====
- Bye

==== Second round ====
- Tie played on October 4, 1984, and on October 11, 1984.

Team 1	Agg.	Team 2	1st leg	2nd leg
Solent Stars (England)	198-225	(France) Limoges CSP	101–114	97–111

==== Top 12 ====
- Tie played on November 1, 1984, and on November 8, 1984.

Team 1	Agg.	Team 2	1st leg	2nd leg
CSKA Moscow (Soviet Union)	182-162	(France) Limoges CSP	101–93	81–69

=== 1985–86 FIBA European Champions Cup, 1st–tier ===
The 1985–86 FIBA European Champions Cup was the 29th installment of the European top-tier level professional basketball club competition FIBA European Champions Cup (now called EuroLeague), running from September 19, 1985, to April 3, 1986. The trophy was won by Cibona, who defeated Žalgiris by a result of 94–82 at Sportcsarnok in Budapest, Hungary. Overall, Limoges CSP achieved in the present competition a record of 3 wins against 11 defeats, in four successive rounds. More detailed:

==== First round ====
- Bye

==== Second round ====
- Tie played on October 3, 1985, and on October 10, 1985.

Team 1	Agg.	Team 2	1st leg	2nd leg
Limoges CSP (France)	177-171	(Belgium) Sunair Oostende	87–78	90–93

==== Top 12 ====
- Tie played on October 31, 1985, and on November 7, 1985.

Team 1	Agg.	Team 2	1st leg	2nd leg
Aris (Greece)	176-186	(France) Limoges CSP	89–81	87–105

==== Semifinals ====
- Day 1 (December 5, 1985)

Team 1	Score	Team 2
Real Madrid (Spain)	101–84	(France) Limoges CSP

- Day 2 (December 12, 1985)

Team 1	Score	Team 2
Limoges CSP (France)	104–116	(Soviet Union) Žalgiris

- Day 3 (January 9, 1986)

Team 1	Score	Team 2
Limoges CSP (France)	88–85*	(Israel) Maccabi Tel Aviv

^{*}Overtime at the end of regulation (77–77).

- Day 4 (January 16, 1986)

Team 1	Score	Team 2
Simac Milano (Italy)	83–77	(France) Limoges CSP

- Day 5 (January 22, 1986)

Team 1	Score	Team 2
Cibona (Socialist Federal Republic of Yugoslavia)	116–106	(France) Limoges CSP

- Day 6 (January 30, 1986)

Team 1	Score	Team 2
Limoges CSP (France)	79–92	(Spain) Real Madrid

- Day 7 (February 20, 1986)

Team 1	Score	Team 2
Žalgiris (Soviet Union)	112–100	(France) Limoges CSP

- Day 8 (February 27, 1986)

Team 1	Score	Team 2
Maccabi Tel Aviv (Israel)	115–96	(France) Limoges CSP

- Day 9 (March 6, 1986)

Team 1	Score	Team 2
Limoges CSP (France)	81–87	(Italy) Simac Milano

- Day 10 (March 12, 1986)

Team 1	Score	Team 2
Limoges CSP (France)	95–106	(Socialist Federal Republic of Yugoslavia) Cibona

- Semifinals group stage standings:

Pos.	Team	Pld.	Pts.	W	L	PF	PA	PD	Tie-break
1.	(Socialist Federal Republic of Yugoslavia) Cibona	10	17	7	3	977	933	+44	1–1 (+6)
2.	(Soviet Union) Žalgiris	10	17	7	3	931	915	+16	1–1 (-6)
3.	(Italy) Simac Milano	10	16	6	4	881	837	+44	
4.	(Spain) Real Madrid	10	15	5	5	944	906	+38	
5.	(Israel) Maccabi Tel Aviv	10	14	4	6	907	946	-39	
6.	(France) Limoges CSP	10	11	1	9	910	1013	-103	

=== 1986–87 FIBA Korać Cup, 3rd–tier ===
The 1986–87 FIBA Korać Cup was the 16th installment of the European 3rd-tier level professional basketball club competition FIBA Korać Cup, running from October 1, 1986, to March 25, 1987. The trophy was won by FC Barcelona, who defeated Limoges CSP by a result of 203–171 in a two-legged final on a home and away basis. Overall, Limoges CSP achieved in present competition a record of 7 wins against 3 defeats, in five successive rounds. More detailed:

==== First round ====
- Bye

==== Second round ====
- Bye

==== Top 16 ====
- Day 1 (December 3, 1986)

Team 1	Score	Team 2
Limoges CSP (France)	104–75	(Soviet Union) Spartak Leningrad

- Day 2 (December 10, 1986)

Team 1	Score	Team 2
Šibenka (Socialist Federal Republic of Yugoslavia)	104–108	(France) Limoges CSP

- Day 3 (January 7, 1987)

Team 1	Score	Team 2
Limoges CSP (France)	98–83	(Italy) Arexons Cantù

- Day 4 (January 14, 1987)

Team 1	Score	Team 2
Spartak Leningrad (Soviet Union)	71–84	(France) Limoges CSP

- Day 5 (January 21, 1987)

Team 1	Score	Team 2
Limoges CSP (France)	111–92	(Socialist Federal Republic of Yugoslavia) Šibenka

- Day 6 (January 28, 1987)

Team 1	Score	Team 2
Arexons Cantù (Italy)	97–88	(France) Limoges CSP

- Group A standings:

Pos.	Team	Pld.	Pts.	W	L	PF	PA	PD
1.	(France) Limoges CSP	6	11	5	1	593	522	+71
2.	(Italy) Arexons Cantù	6	10	4	2	546	516	+30
3.	(Soviet Union) Spartak Leningrad	6	9	3	3	489	510	-21
4.	(Socialist Federal Republic of Yugoslavia) Šibenka	6	6	0	6	521	601	-80

==== Semifinals ====
- Tie played on February 18, 1987, and on February 25, 1987.

Team 1	Agg.	Team 2	1st leg	2nd leg
CAI Zaragoza (Spain)	167–189	(France) Limoges CSP	76–85	91–104

==== Finals ====
- Tie played on March 18, 1987, at Palau Blaugrana in Barcelona, Spain and on March 25, 1987, at Palais des Sports de Beaublanc in Limoges, France.

Team 1	Agg.	Team 2	1st leg	2nd leg
FC Barcelona (Spain)	203–171	(France) Limoges CSP	106–85	97–86

=== 1987–88 FIBA European Cup Winners' Cup, 2nd–tier ===
The 1987–88 FIBA European Cup Winners' Cup was the 22nd installment of FIBA's 2nd-tier level European-wide professional club basketball competition FIBA European Cup Winners' Cup (lately called FIBA Saporta Cup), running from September 22, 1987, to March 16, 1988. The trophy was won by Limoges CSP, who defeated Ram Joventut by a result of 96–89 at Palais des Sports in Grenoble, France. Overall, Limoges CSP achieved in the present competition a record of 10 wins against 1 defeat, in five successive rounds. More detailed:

==== First round ====
- Bye

==== Second round ====
- Tie played on October 13, 1987, and on October 20, 1987.

Team 1	Agg.	Team 2	1st leg	2nd leg
Uudenkaupungin Urheilijat (Finland)	198–231	(France) Limoges CSP	94–123	104–108

==== Quarterfinals ====
- Day 1 (December 2, 1987)

Team 1	Score	Team 2
Polycell Kingston (England)	106–108	(France) Limoges CSP

- Day 2 (December 8, 1987)

Team 1	Score	Team 2
Limoges CSP (France)	93–86	(West Germany) Bayer 04 Leverkusen

- Day 3 (December 15, 1987)

Team 1	Score	Team 2
Limoges CSP (France)	114–103	(Socialist Federal Republic of Yugoslavia) IMT

- Day 4 (January 5, 1988)

Team 1	Score	Team 2
Limoges CSP (France)	122–109	(England) Polycell Kingston

- Day 5 (January 13, 1988)

Team 1	Score	Team 2
Bayer 04 Leverkusen (West Germany)	92–111	(France) Limoges CSP

- Day 6 (January 19, 1988)

Team 1	Score	Team 2
IMT (Socialist Federal Republic of Yugoslavia)	92–102	(France) Limoges CSP

- Group A standings:

Pos.	Team	Pld.	Pts.	W	L	PF	PA	PD
1.	(France) Limoges CSP	6	12	6	0	650	589	+61
2.	(West Germany) Bayer 04 Leverkusen	6	9	3	3	546	549	-3
3.	(England) Polycell Kingston	6	8	2	4	580	601	-21
4.	(Socialist Federal Republic of Yugoslavia) IMT	6	7	1	5	550	587	-37

==== Semifinals ====
- Tie played on February 9, 1988, and on February 16, 1988.

Team 1	Agg.	Team 2	1st leg	2nd leg
Limoges CSP (France)	193–179	(Italy) Scavolini Pesaro	102–86	91–93

==== Final ====
- March 16, 1988, at Palais des Sports in Grenoble, France.

Team 1	Score	Team 2
Limoges CSP (France)	96–89	(Spain) Ram Joventut

=== 1988–89 FIBA European Champions Cup, 1st–tier ===
The 1988–89 FIBA European Champions Cup was the 32nd installment of the European top-tier level professional basketball club competition FIBA European Champions Cup (now called EuroLeague), running from October 13, 1988, to April 6, 1989. The trophy was won by Jugoplastika, who defeated Maccabi Tel Aviv by a result of 75–69 at Olympiahalle in Munich, West Germany. Overall, Limoges CSP achieved in the present competition a record of 7 wins against 9 defeats, in three successive rounds. More detailed:

==== First round ====
- Bye

==== Top 16 ====
- Tie played on November 3, 1988, and on November 10, 1988.

Team 1	Agg.	Team 2	1st leg	2nd leg
Zbrojovka Brno (Czechoslovakia)	141-240	(France) Limoges CSP	87–111	54–129

==== Quarterfinals ====
- Day 1 (December 8, 1988)

Team 1	Score	Team 2
Jugoplastika (Socialist Federal Republic of Yugoslavia)	87–78	(France) Limoges CSP

- Day 2 (December 14, 1988)

Team 1	Score	Team 2
Limoges CSP (France)	67–87	(Israel) Maccabi Tel Aviv

- Day 3 (December 22, 1988)

Team 1	Score	Team 2
Scavolini Pesaro (Italy)	90–84	(France) Limoges CSP

- Day 4 (January 5, 1989)

Team 1	Score	Team 2
Limoges CSP (France)	107–70	(Netherlands) Nashua EBBC

- Day 5 (January 12, 1989)

Team 1	Score	Team 2
FC Barcelona (Spain)	84–82	(France) Limoges CSP

- Day 6 (January 19, 1989)

Team 1	Score	Team 2
Aris (Greece)	80–77	(France) Limoges CSP

- Day 7 (January 25, 1989)

Team 1	Score	Team 2
Limoges CSP (France)	78–85	(Soviet Union) CSKA Moscow

- Day 8 (February 1, 1989)

Team 1	Score	Team 2
Limoges CSP (France)	95–93	(Socialist Federal Republic of Yugoslavia) Jugoplastika

- Day 9 (February 16, 1989)

Team 1	Score	Team 2
Maccabi Tel Aviv (Israel)	97–92	(France) Limoges CSP

- Day 10 (February 23, 1989)

Team 1	Score	Team 2
Limoges CSP (France)	92–84	(Italy) Scavolini Pesaro

- Day 11 (March 1, 1989)

Team 1	Score	Team 2
Nashua EBBC (Netherlands)	86–101	(France) Limoges CSP

- Day 12 (March 8, 1989)

Team 1	Score	Team 2
Limoges CSP (France)	104–101	(Spain) FC Barcelona

- Day 13 (March 16, 1989)

Team 1	Score	Team 2
Limoges CSP (France)	115–106	(Greece) Aris

- Day 14 (March 22, 1989)

Team 1	Score	Team 2
CSKA Moscow (Soviet Union)	116–97	(France) Limoges CSP

- Quarterfinals group stage standings:

Pos.	Team	Pld.	Pts.	W	L	PF	PA	PD	Tie-break
1.	(Israel) Maccabi Tel Aviv	14	26	12	2	1314	1221	+93	
2.	(Spain) FC Barcelona	14	25	11	3	1207	1120	+87	
3.	(Socialist Federal Republic of Yugoslavia) Jugoplastika	14	22	8	6	1205	1167	+38	1–1 (0)
4.	(Greece) Aris	14	22	8	6	1269	1261	+8	1–1 (0)
5.	(France) Limoges CSP	14	20	6	8	1269	1266	+3	
6.	(Italy) Scavolini Pesaro	14	19	5	9	1130	1174	-44	
7.	(Soviet Union) CSKA Moscow	14	18	4	10	1156	1194	-38	
8.	(Netherlands) Nashua EBBC	14	16	2	12	1159	1306	-147	

== 1990s ==
=== 1989–90 FIBA European Champions Cup, 1st–tier ===
The 1989–90 FIBA European Champions Cup was the 33rd installment of the European top-tier level professional basketball club competition FIBA European Champions Cup (now called EuroLeague), running from September 28, 1989, to April 19, 1990. The trophy was won by Jugoplastika, who defeated FC Barcelona Banca Catalana by a result of 72–67 at Pabellón Príncipe Felipe in Zaragoza, Spain. Overall, Limoges CSP achieved in the present competition a record of 13 wins against 5 defeats, in five successive rounds. More detailed:

==== First round ====
- Bye

==== Top 16 ====
- Tie played on October 26, 1989, and on November 2, 1989.

Team 1	Agg.	Team 2	1st leg	2nd leg
Pully (Switzerland)	197-242	(France) Limoges CSP	95–115	102–127

==== Quarterfinals ====
- Day 1 (December 7, 1989)

Team 1	Score	Team 2
Maccabi Tel Aviv (Israel)	78–88	(France) Limoges CSP

- Day 2 (December 14, 1989)

Team 1	Score	Team 2
Limoges CSP (France)	112–80	(Netherlands) Commodore Den Helder

- Day 3 (January 4, 1990)

Team 1	Score	Team 2
Jugoplastika (Socialist Federal Republic of Yugoslavia)	103–83	(France) Limoges CSP

- Day 4 (January 11, 1990)

Team 1	Score	Team 2
Limoges CSP (France)	94–84	(Greece) Aris

- Day 5 (January 18, 1990)

Team 1	Score	Team 2
Limoges CSP (France)	115–90	(Poland) Lech Poznań

- Day 6 (January 24, 1990)

Team 1	Score	Team 2
FC Barcelona Banca Catalana (Spain)	72–63	(France) Limoges CSP

- Day 7 (February 1, 1990)

Team 1	Score	Team 2
Philips Milano (Italy)	99–104	(France) Limoges CSP

- Day 8 (February 8, 1990)

Team 1	Score	Team 2
Limoges CSP (France)	100–75	(Israel) Maccabi Tel Aviv

- Day 9 (February 22, 1990)

Team 1	Score	Team 2
Commodore Den Helder (Netherlands)	84–88	(France) Limoges CSP

- Day 10 (March 1, 1990)

Team 1	Score	Team 2
Limoges CSP (France)	100–93	(Socialist Federal Republic of Yugoslavia) Jugoplastika

- Day 11 (March 8, 1990)

Team 1	Score	Team 2
Aris (Greece)	89–79	(France) Limoges CSP

- Day 12 (March 15, 1990)

Team 1	Score	Team 2
Lech Poznań (Poland)	91–118	(France) Limoges CSP

- Day 13 (March 21, 1990)

Team 1	Score	Team 2
Limoges CSP (France)	91–103	(Spain) FC Barcelona Banca Catalana

- Day 14 (March 29, 1990)

Team 1	Score	Team 2
Limoges CSP (France)	85–76	(Italy) Philips Milano

- Quarterfinals group stage standings:

Pos.	Team	Pld.	Pts.	W	L	PF	PA	PD
1.	(Spain) FC Barcelona Banca Catalana	14	26	12	2	1291	1084	+207
2.	(Socialist Federal Republic of Yugoslavia) Jugoplastika	14	25	11	3	1277	1114	+163
3.	(France) Limoges CSP	14	24	10	4	1320	1217	+103
4.	(Greece) Aris	14	22	8	6	1296	1224	+72
5.	(Italy) Philips Milano	14	21	7	7	1271	1279	-8
6.	(Israel) Maccabi Tel Aviv	14	20	6	8	1185	1241	-56
7.	(Netherlands) Commodore Den Helder	14	16	2	12	1147	1291	-144
8.	(Poland) Lech Poznań	14	14	0	14	1147	1484	-337

==== Final four ====
The 1990 FIBA European Champions Cup Final Four, was the 1989–90 season's FIBA European Champions Cup Final Four tournament, organized by FIBA Europe.

- Semifinals: April 17, 1990, at Pabellón Príncipe Felipe in Zaragoza, Spain.

Team 1	Score	Team 2
Jugoplastika (Socialist Federal Republic of Yugoslavia)	101–83	(France) Limoges CSP

- 3rd place game: April 19, 1990, at Pabellón Príncipe Felipe in Zaragoza, Spain.

Team 1	Score	Team 2
Aris (Greece)	91–103	(France) Limoges CSP

- Final four standings:

Pos.	Team	Rec.
	(Socialist Federal Republic of Yugoslavia) Jugoplastika	2–0
Silver medal	(Spain) FC Barcelona Banca Catalana	1–1
Bronze medal	(France) Limoges CSP	1–1
4th	(Greece) Aris	0–2

=== 1990–91 FIBA European Champions Cup, 1st–tier ===
The 1990–91 FIBA European Champions Cup was the 34th installment of the European top-tier level professional basketball club competition FIBA European Champions Cup (now called EuroLeague), running from September 27, 1990, to April 18, 1991. The trophy was won by POP 84, who defeated FC Barcelona Banca Catalana by a result of 70–65 at Palais Omnisports de Paris-Bercy in Paris, France. Overall, Limoges CSP achieved in the present competition a record of 5 wins against 11 defeats, in three successive rounds. More detailed:

==== First round ====
- Bye

==== Top 16 ====
- Tie played on October 25, 1990, and on November 1, 1990.

Team 1	Agg.	Team 2	1st leg	2nd leg
CSKA Sofia (Bulgaria)	189–224	(France) Limoges CSP	90–105	99–119

==== Quarterfinals ====
- Day 1 (December 13, 1990)

Team 1	Score	Team 2
Maccabi Tel Aviv (Israel)	100–92	(France) Limoges CSP

- Day 2 (December 20, 1990)

Team 1	Score	Team 2
Limoges CSP (France)	88–100	(Germany) Bayer 04 Leverkusen

- Day 3 (January 3, 1991)

Team 1	Score	Team 2
Scavolini Pesaro (Italy)	93–73	(France) Limoges CSP

- Day 4 (January 10, 1991)

Team 1	Score	Team 2
Limoges CSP (France)	88–71	(England) Kingston

- Day 5 (January 16, 1991)

Team 1	Score	Team 2
FC Barcelona Banca Catalana (Spain)	84–76	(France) Limoges CSP

- Day 6 (January 24, 1991)

Team 1	Score	Team 2
Aris (Greece)	108–88	(France) Limoges CSP

- Day 7 (January 31, 1991)

Team 1	Score	Team 2
Limoges CSP (France)	73–84	(Socialist Federal Republic of Yugoslavia) POP 84

- Day 8 (February 7, 1991)

Team 1	Score	Team 2
Limoges CSP (France)	95–114	(Israel) Maccabi Tel Aviv

- Day 9 (February 14, 1991)

Team 1	Score	Team 2
Bayer 04 Leverkusen (Germany)	112–101	(France) Limoges CSP

- Day 10 (February 28, 1991)

Team 1	Score	Team 2
Limoges CSP (France)	110–92	(Italy) Scavolini Pesaro

- Day 11 (March 7, 1991)

Team 1	Score	Team 2
Kingston (England)	96–77	(France) Limoges CSP

- Day 12 (March 13, 1991)

Team 1	Score	Team 2
Limoges CSP (France)	104–95	(Spain) FC Barcelona Banca Catalana

- Day 13 (March 21, 1991)

Team 1	Score	Team 2
Limoges CSP (France)	98–106	(Greece) Aris

- Day 14 (March 28, 1991)

Team 1	Score	Team 2
POP 84 (Socialist Federal Republic of Yugoslavia)	92–88	(France) Limoges CSP

- Quarterfinals group stage standings:

Pos.	Team	Pld.	Pts.	W	L	PF	PA	PD	Tie-break
1.	(Spain) FC Barcelona Banca Catalana	14	25	11	3	1276	1148	+128	
2.	(Socialist Federal Republic of Yugoslavia) POP 84	14	23	9	5	1208	1174	+34	
3.	(Italy) Scavolini Pesaro	14	22	8	6	1318	1290	+28	2–0
4.	(Israel) Maccabi Tel Aviv	14	22	8	6	1224	1163	+61	0–2
5.	(Greece) Aris	14	21	7	7	1314	1324	-10	
6.	(Germany) Bayer 04 Leverkusen	14	20	6	8	1334	1392	-58	
7.	(England) Kingston	14	18	4	10	1141	1221	-80	
8.	(France) Limoges CSP	14	17	3	11	1251	1354	-104	

=== 1991–92 FIBA European Cup, 2nd–tier ===
The 1991–92 FIBA European Cup was the 26th installment of FIBA's 2nd-tier level European-wide professional club basketball competition FIBA European Cup (lately called FIBA Saporta Cup), running from September 10, 1991, to March 17, 1992. The trophy was won by Real Madrid Asegurator, who defeated the title holder PAOK by a result of 65–63 at Palais des Sports de Beaulieu in Nantes, France. Overall, Limoges CSP achieved in the present competition a record of 8 wins against 6 defeats, in four successive rounds. More detailed:

==== First round ====
- Bye

==== Second round ====
- Tie played on October 1, 1991, and on October 8, 1991.

Team 1	Agg.	Team 2	1st leg	2nd leg
Etzella (Luxembourg)	140–242	(France) Limoges CSP	68–123	72–119

==== Third round ====
- Tie played on October 29, 1991, and on November 5, 1991.

Team 1	Agg.	Team 2	1st leg	2nd leg
KTP (Finland)	160–208	(France) Limoges CSP	86–110	74–98

==== Top 12 ====
- Day 1 (November 26, 1991)

Team 1	Score	Team 2
Glaxo Verona (Italy)	92–89	(France) Limoges CSP

- Day 2 (December 3, 1991)

Team 1	Score	Team 2
Limoges CSP (France)	109–89	(Belgium) Sunair Oostende

- Day 3 (December 11, 1991)

Team 1	Score	Team 2
Limoges CSP (France)	79–81	(Greece) PAOK

- Day 4 (December 17, 1991)

Team 1	Score	Team 2
Alba Berlin (Germany)	72–75	(France) Limoges CSP

- Day 5 (January 7, 1992)

Team 1	Score	Team 2
Maccabi Rishon LeZion (Israel)	88–100	(France) Limoges CSP

- Day 6 (January 15, 1992)

Team 1	Score	Team 2
Limoges CSP (France)	73–76	(Italy) Glaxo Verona

- Day 7 (January 21, 1992)

Team 1	Score	Team 2
Sunair Oostende (Belgium)	110–97	(France) Limoges CSP

- Day 8 (January 28, 1992)

Team 1	Score	Team 2
PAOK (Greece)	79–68	(France) Limoges CSP

- Day 9 (February 5, 1992)

Team 1	Score	Team 2
Limoges CSP (France)	73–77	(Germany) Alba Berlin

- Day 10 (February 11, 1992)

Team 1	Score	Team 2
Limoges CSP (France)	92–77	(Israel) Maccabi Rishon LeZion

- Group A standings:

Pos.	Team	Pld.	Pts.	W	L	PF	PA	PD	Tie-break
1.	(Greece) PAOK	10	19	9	1	829	762	+67	
2.	(Italy) Glaxo Verona	10	18	8	2	862	818	+44	
3.	(France) Limoges CSP	10	14	4	6	855	841	+14	1–1 (+7)
4.	(Belgium) Sunair Oostende	10	14	4	6	935	903	+32	1–1 (-7)
5.	(Israel) Maccabi Rishon LeZion	10	13	3	7	891	959	-68	
6.	(Germany) Alba Berlin	10	12	2	8	758	847	-89	

=== 1992–93 FIBA European League, 1st–tier ===
The 1992–93 FIBA European League was the 36th installment of the European top-tier level professional club competition for basketball clubs (now called EuroLeague), running from September 10, 1992, to April 15, 1993. The trophy was won by Limoges CSP, who defeated Benetton Treviso by a result of 59–55 at Peace and Friendship Stadium in Piraeus, Greece. Overall, Limoges CSP achieved in present competition a record of 12 wins against 6 defeats plus 1 draw, in six successive rounds. More detailed:

==== First round ====
- Bye

==== Second round ====
- Tie played on September 30, 1992, and on October 8, 1992.

Team 1	Agg.	Team 2	1st leg	2nd leg
Guildford Kings (England)	129–143	(France) Limoges CSP	72–72	57–71

==== Top 16 ====
- Day 1 (October 29, 1992)

Bye: Partizan was the title holder but was not allowed to compete due to United Nations embargo on FR Yugoslavia.

- Day 2 (November 5, 1992)

Team 1	Score	Team 2
PAOK (Greece)	67–57	(France) Limoges CSP

- Day 3 (November 26, 1992)

Team 1	Score	Team 2
Limoges CSP (France)	63–76	(Italy) Knorr Bologna

- Day 4 (December 3, 1992)

Team 1	Score	Team 2
Marbella Joventut (Spain)	62–78	(France) Limoges CSP

- Day 5 (December 10, 1992)

Team 1	Score	Team 2
Limoges CSP (France)	83–52	(Croatia) Cibona

- Day 6 (December 17, 1992)

Team 1	Score	Team 2
Scavolini Pesaro (Italy)	61–76	(France) Limoges CSP

- Day 7 (January 7, 1993)

Team 1	Score	Team 2
Limoges CSP (France)	75–63	(Israel) Maccabi Tel Aviv

- Day 8 (January 14, 1993)

Bye: Partizan was the title holder but was not allowed to compete due to United Nations embargo on FR Yugoslavia.

- Day 9 (January 20, 1993)

Team 1	Score	Team 2
Limoges CSP (France)	60–58	(Greece) PAOK

- Day 10 (January 28, 1993)

Team 1	Score	Team 2
Knorr Bologna (Italy)	70–67	(France) Limoges CSP

- Day 11 (February 4, 1993)

Team 1	Score	Team 2
Limoges CSP (France)	65–73	(Spain) Marbella Joventut

- Day 12 (February 10, 1993)

Team 1	Score	Team 2
Cibona (Croatia)	58–62	(France) Limoges CSP

- Day 13 (February 18, 1993)

Team 1	Score	Team 2
Limoges CSP (France)	61–47	(Italy) Scavolini Pesaro

- Day 14 (February 25, 1993)

Team 1	Score	Team 2
Maccabi Tel Aviv (Israel)	70–69	(France) Limoges CSP

- Group A standings:

Pos.	Team	Pld.	Pts.	W	L	PF	PA	PD	Tie-break
1.	(Greece) PAOK	12	20	8	4	879	839	+40	
2.	(France) Limoges CSP	12	19	7	5	816	757	+59	2–0
3.	(Italy) Scavolini Pesaro	12	19	7	5	887	877	+10	0–2
4.	(Italy) Knorr Bologna	12	18	6	6	938	893	+45	1–1 (+2)
5.	(Spain) Marbella Joventut	12	18	6	6	945	946	-1	1–1 (-2)
6.	(Croatia) Cibona	12	17	5	7	909	976	-67	
7.	(Israel) Maccabi Tel Aviv	12	15	3	9	934	1020	-86	
8.	(Federal Republic of Yugoslavia) Partizan	0	0	0	0	0	0	0	

==== Quarterfinals ====
- Best-of-3 playoff: Game 1 away on March 11, 1993 / Game 2 at home on March 15, 1993 / Game 3 at home on March 17, 1993.

Team 1	Agg.	Team 2	1st leg	2nd leg	3rd leg
Olympiacos (Greece)	1–2	(France) Limoges CSP	70–67	53–59	58–60

==== Final four ====
The 1993 FIBA European League Final Four, was the 1992–93 season's FIBA European League Final Four tournament, organized by FIBA Europe.

- Semifinals: April 13, 1993, at Peace and Friendship Stadium in Piraeus, Greece.

Team 1	Score	Team 2
Real Madrid Teka (Spain)	52–62	(France) Limoges CSP

- Final: April 15, 1993, at Peace and Friendship Stadium in Piraeus, Greece.

Team 1	Score	Team 2
Benetton Treviso (Italy)	55–59	(France) Limoges CSP

- Final four standings:

Pos.	Team	Rec.
	(France) Limoges CSP	2–0
Silver medal	(Italy) Benetton Treviso	1–1
Bronze medal	(Greece) PAOK	1–1
4th	(Spain) Real Madrid Teka	0–2

=== 1993–94 FIBA European League, 1st–tier ===
The 1993–94 FIBA European League was the 37th installment of the European top-tier level professional club competition for basketball clubs (now called EuroLeague), running from September 9, 1993, to April 21, 1994. The trophy was won by 7up Joventut, who defeated Olympiacos by a result of 59–57 at Yad Eliyahu Arena in Tel Aviv, Israel. Overall, Limoges CSP achieved in present competition a record of 10 wins against 7 defeats, in four successive rounds. More detailed:

==== First round ====
- Bye

==== Second round ====
- Bye

==== Top 16 ====
- Day 1 (October 28, 1993)

Team 1	Score	Team 2
FC Barcelona Banca Catalana (Spain)	86–76*	(France) Limoges CSP

^{*}Overtime at the end of regulation (71–71).

- Day 2 (November 4, 1993)

Team 1	Score	Team 2
Limoges CSP (France)	71–54	(Germany) Bayer 04 Leverkusen

- Day 3 (November 24, 1993)

Team 1	Score	Team 2
Guildford Kings (England)	73–80	(France) Limoges CSP

- Day 4 (December 1, 1993)

Team 1	Score	Team 2
Limoges CSP (France)	83–67	(Spain) Real Madrid Teka

- Day 5 (December 9, 1993)

Team 1	Score	Team 2
Limoges CSP (France)	87–89	(Italy) Benetton Treviso

- Day 6 (December 15, 1993)

Team 1	Score	Team 2
Maes Pils (Belgium)	73–64	(France) Limoges CSP

- Day 7 (January 6, 1994)

Team 1	Score	Team 2
Olympiacos (Greece)	59–67	(France) Limoges CSP

- Day 8 (January 13, 1994)

Team 1	Score	Team 2
Limoges CSP (France)	88–82	(Spain) FC Barcelona Banca Catalana

- Day 9 (January 20, 1994)

Team 1	Score	Team 2
Bayer 04 Leverkusen (Germany)	87–67	(France) Limoges CSP

- Day 10 (January 27, 1994)

Team 1	Score	Team 2
Limoges CSP (France)	72–55	(England) Guildford Kings

- Day 11 (February 2, 1994)

Team 1	Score	Team 2
Real Madrid Teka (Spain)	81–36	(France) Limoges CSP

- Day 12 (February 10, 1994)

Team 1	Score	Team 2
Benetton Treviso (Italy)	61–65	(France) Limoges CSP

- Day 13 (February 16, 1994)

Team 1	Score	Team 2
Limoges CSP (France)	90–53	(Belgium) Maes Pils

- Day 14 (February 23, 1994)

Team 1	Score	Team 2
Limoges CSP (France)	67–59	(Greece) Olympiacos

- Group A standings:

Pos.	Team	Pld.	Pts.	W	L	PF	PA	PD	Tie-break
1.	(Greece) Olympiacos	14	25	11	3	1047	897	+150	
2.	(Spain) Real Madrid Teka	14	23	9	5	1123	978	+145	1–1 (+29)
3.	(France) Limoges CSP	14	23	9	5	1013	979	+34	1–1 (-29)
4.	(Spain) FC Barcelona Banca Catalana	14	22	8	6	1132	1067	+65	1–1 (+15)
5.	(Belgium) Maes Pils	14	22	8	6	1040	1072	-32	1–1 (-15)
6.	(Italy) Benetton Treviso	14	21	7	7	1085	1072	+13	
7.	(Germany) Bayer 04 Leverkusen	14	18	4	10	1022	1045	-23	
8.	(England) Guildford Kings	14	14	0	14	889	1241	-352	

==== Quarterfinals ====
- Best-of-3 playoff: Game 1 at home on March 10, 1994 / Game 2 away on March 15, 1994 / Game 3 away on March 17, 1994.

Team 1	Agg.	Team 2	1st leg	2nd leg	3rd leg
Limoges CSP (France)	1–2	(Greece) Panathinaikos	75–68	48–59	73–87

=== 1994–95 FIBA European League, 1st–tier ===
The 1994–95 FIBA European League was the 38th installment of the European top-tier level professional club competition for basketball clubs (now called EuroLeague), running from September 8, 1994, to April 13, 1995. The trophy was won by Real Madrid Teka, who defeated Olympiacos by a result of 73–61 at Pabellón Príncipe Felipe in Zaragoza, Spain. Overall, Limoges CSP achieved in present competition a record of 14 wins against 7 defeats, in six successive rounds. More detailed:

==== First round ====
- Bye

==== Second round ====
- Tie played on September 29, 1994, and on October 6, 1994.

Team 1	Agg.	Team 2	1st leg	2nd leg
Bioveta COOP Banka Brno (Czech Republic)	109–155	(France) Limoges CSP	52–71	57–84

==== Top 16 ====
- Day 1 (October 27, 1994)

Team 1	Score	Team 2
Cibona (Croatia)	76–69	(France) Limoges CSP

- Day 2 (November 2, 1994)

Team 1	Score	Team 2
Limoges CSP (France)	68–60	(Italy) Buckler Beer Bologna

- Day 3 (November 24, 1994)

Team 1	Score	Team 2
FC Barcelona Banca Catalana (Spain)	84–81	(France) Limoges CSP

- Day 4 (December 1, 1994)

Team 1	Score	Team 2
Limoges CSP (France)	76–57	(Turkey) Efes Pilsen

- Day 5 (December 8, 1994)

Team 1	Score	Team 2
Limoges CSP (France)	66–59	(Greece) Olympiacos

- Day 6 (December 14, 1994)

Team 1	Score	Team 2
7up Joventut (Spain)	56–61*	(France) Limoges CSP

^{*}Overtime at the end of regulation (48–48).

- Day 7 (January 5, 1995)

Team 1	Score	Team 2
Bayer 04 Leverkusen (Germany)	74–69	(France) Limoges CSP

- Day 8 (January 12, 1995)

Team 1	Score	Team 2
Limoges CSP (France)	81–63	(Croatia) Cibona

- Day 9 (January 19, 1995)

Team 1	Score	Team 2
Buckler Beer Bologna (Italy)	74–59	(France) Limoges CSP

- Day 10 (January 26, 1995)

Team 1	Score	Team 2
Limoges CSP (France)	69–57	(Spain) FC Barcelona Banca Catalana

- Day 11 (February 2, 1995)

Team 1	Score	Team 2
Efes Pilsen (Turkey)	64–69	(France) Limoges CSP

- Day 12 (February 9, 1995)

Team 1	Score	Team 2
Olympiacos (Greece)	73–76	(France) Limoges CSP

- Day 13 (February 16, 1995)

Team 1	Score	Team 2
Limoges CSP (France)	76–67	(Spain) 7up Joventut

- Day 14 (February 23, 1995)

Team 1	Score	Team 2
Limoges CSP (France)	63–47	(Germany) Bayer 04 Leverkusen

- Group A standings:

Pos.	Team	Pld.	Pts.	W	L	PF	PA	PD	Tie-break
1.	(France) Limoges CSP	14	24	10	4	983	911	+72	
2.	(Greece) Olympiacos	14	23	9	5	1086	958	+128	
3.	(Croatia) Cibona	14	22	8	6	1049	1060	-11	4–2
4.	(Italy) Buckler Beer Bologna	14	22	8	6	1072	1023	+49	3–3 (+12)
5.	(Turkey) Efes Pilsen	14	22	8	6	900	912	-12	3–3 (-12)
6.	(Spain) FC Barcelona Banca Catalana	14	22	8	6	1095	1079	+16	2–4
7.	(Germany) Bayer 04 Leverkusen	14	18	4	10	1009	1100	-91	
8.	(Spain) 7up Joventut	14	15	1	13	923	1074	-151	

==== Quarterfinals ====
- Best-of-3 playoff: Game 1 away on March 9, 1995 / Game 2 at home on March 14, 1995 / Game 3 at home on March 16, 1995.

Team 1	Agg.	Team 2	1st leg	2nd leg	3rd leg
Scavolini Pesaro (Italy)	1–2	(France) Limoges CSP	68–55	66–79	72–82

==== Final four ====
The 1995 FIBA European League Final Four, was the 1994–95 season's FIBA European League Final Four tournament, organized by FIBA Europe.

- Semifinals: April 11, 1995, at Pabellón Príncipe Felipe in Zaragoza, Spain.

Team 1	Score	Team 2
Real Madrid Teka (Spain)	62–49	(France) Limoges CSP

- 3rd place game: April 13, 1995, at Pabellón Príncipe Felipe in Zaragoza, Spain.

Team 1	Score	Team 2
Limoges CSP (France)	77–91	(Greece) Panathinaikos

- Final four standings:

Pos.	Team	Rec.
	(Spain) Real Madrid Teka	2–0
Silver medal	(Greece) Olympiacos	1–1
Bronze medal	(Greece) Panathinaikos	1–1
4th	(France) Limoges CSP	0–2

=== 1995–96 FIBA European Cup, 2nd–tier ===
The 1995–96 FIBA European Cup was the 30th installment of FIBA's 2nd-tier level European-wide professional club basketball competition FIBA European Cup (lately called FIBA Saporta Cup), running from September 5, 1995, to March 12, 1996. The trophy was won by Taugrés, who defeated PAOK by a result of 88–81 at Pabellón Álava in Vitoria-Gasteiz, Spain. Overall, Limoges CSP achieved in the present competition a record of 10 wins against 4 defeats, in four successive rounds. More detailed:

==== First round ====
- Bye

==== Second round ====
- Tie played on September 26, 1995, and on October 3, 1995.

Team 1	Agg.	Team 2	1st leg	2nd leg
FC Porto (Portugal)	124–172	(France) Limoges CSP	52–95	72–77

==== Third round ====
- Tie played on October 24, 1995, and on November 1, 1995.

Team 1	Agg.	Team 2	1st leg	2nd leg
Limoges CSP (France)	171–135	(Ukraine) Dendi-Basket	97–64	74–71

==== Top 12 ====
- Day 1 (November 21, 1995)

Team 1	Score	Team 2
Limoges CSP (France)	82–60	(Israel) Bnei Herzliya

- Day 2 (November 28, 1995)

Team 1	Score	Team 2
Taugrés (Spain)	79–73	(France) Limoges CSP

- Day 3 (December 5, 1995)

Team 1	Score	Team 2
Limoges CSP (France)	78–75	(Federal Republic of Yugoslavia) Partizan

- Day 4 (December 12, 1995)

Team 1	Score	Team 2
Žalgiris (Lithuania)	76–74	(France) Limoges CSP

- Day 5 (December 19, 1995)

Team 1	Score	Team 2
Limoges CSP (France)	84–64	(Belgium) Sunair Oostende

- Day 6 (January 3, 1996)

Team 1	Score	Team 2
Bnei Herzliya (Israel)	83–91	(France) Limoges CSP

- Day 7 (January 9, 1996)

Team 1	Score	Team 2
Limoges CSP (France)	88–68	(Spain) Taugrés

- Day 8 (January 16, 1996)

Team 1	Score	Team 2
Partizan (Federal Republic of Yugoslavia)	103–90	(France) Limoges CSP

- Day 9 (January 23, 1996)

Team 1	Score	Team 2
Limoges CSP (France)	82–68	(Lithuania) Žalgiris

- Day 10 (January 30, 1996)

Team 1	Score	Team 2
Sunair Oostende (Belgium)	76–75	(France) Limoges CSP

- Group A standings:

Pos.	Team	Pld.	Pts.	W	L	PF	PA	PD	Tie-break
1.	(Spain) Taugrés	10	17	7	3	821	788	+33	1–1 (+9)
2.	(Lithuania) Žalgiris	10	17	7	3	852	833	+19	1–1 (-9)
3.	(France) Limoges CSP	10	16	6	4	817	752	+65	
4.	(Federal Republic of Yugoslavia) Partizan	10	14	4	6	886	867	+19	
5.	(Israel) Bnei Herzliya	10	13	3	7	776	837	–61	2–0
6.	(Belgium) Sunair Oostende	10	13	3	7	746	821	–75	0–2

=== 1996–97 FIBA EuroLeague, 1st–tier ===
The 1996–97 FIBA EuroLeague was the 40th installment of the European top-tier level professional club competition for basketball clubs (now called simply EuroLeague), running from September 19, 1996, to April 24, 1997. The trophy was won by Olympiacos, who defeated FC Barcelona Banca Catalana by a result of 73–58 at PalaEUR in Rome, Italy. Overall, Limoges CSP achieved in present competition a record of 8 wins against 10 defeats, in three successive rounds. More detailed:

==== First round ====
- Day 1 (September 19, 1996)

Team 1	Score	Team 2
Limoges CSP (France)	62–69	(Israel) Maccabi Tel Aviv

- Day 2 (September 26, 1996)

Team 1	Score	Team 2
Limoges CSP (France)	74–85	(Italy) Stefanel Milano

- Day 3 (October 2, 1996)

Team 1	Score	Team 2
Panionios Ethniki Asfalistiki (Greece)	92–77	(France) Limoges CSP

- Day 4 (October 10, 1996)

Team 1	Score	Team 2
Limoges CSP (France)	84–80	(Turkey) Ülker

- Day 5 (October 17, 1996)

Team 1	Score	Team 2
CSKA Moscow (Russia)	74–65	(France) Limoges CSP

- Day 6 (November 7, 1996)

Team 1	Score	Team 2
Maccabi Tel Aviv (Israel)	69–77	(France) Limoges CSP

- Day 7 (November 14, 1996)

Team 1	Score	Team 2
Stefanel Milano (Italy)	79–66	(France) Limoges CSP

- Day 8 (November 21, 1996)

Team 1	Score	Team 2
Limoges CSP (France)	78–75	(Greece) Panionios Ethniki Asfalistiki

- Day 9 (December 5, 1996)

Team 1	Score	Team 2
Ülker (Turkey)	99–91*	(France) Limoges CSP

^{*}Two overtimes at the end of regulation (73–73 and 85–85).

- Day 10 (December 12, 1996)

Team 1	Score	Team 2
Limoges CSP (France)	83–66	(Russia) CSKA Moscow

- Group A standings:

Pos.	Team	Pld.	Pts.	W	L	PF	PA	PD	Tie-break
1.	(Italy) Stefanel Milano	10	17	7	3	775	727	+48	
2.	(Russia) CSKA Moscow	10	16	6	4	761	734	+27	2–0
3.	(Israel) Maccabi Tel Aviv	10	16	6	4	798	773	+26	0–2
4.	(Turkey) Ülker	10	14	4	6	780	767	+13	1–1 (+4)
5.	(France) Limoges CSP	10	14	4	6	731	723	+8	1–1 (-4)
6.	(Greece) Panionios Ethniki Asfalistiki	10	13	3	7	711	830	-119	

==== Second round ====
- Day 1 (January 9, 1997)

Team 1	Score	Team 2
Limoges CSP (France)	91–85	(Spain) Estudiantes Argentaria

- Day 2 (January 16, 1997)

Team 1	Score	Team 2
Teamsystem Bologna (Italy)	90–76	(France) Limoges CSP

- Day 3 (January 23, 1997)

Team 1	Score	Team 2
Limoges CSP (France)	85–61	(Croatia) Cibona

- Day 4 (February 6, 1997)

Team 1	Score	Team 2
Estudiantes Argentaria (Spain)	68–70	(France) Limoges CSP

- Day 5 (February 13, 1997)

Team 1	Score	Team 2
Limoges CSP (France)	81–70	(Italy) Teamsystem Bologna

- Day 6 (February 20, 1997)

Team 1	Score	Team 2
Cibona (Croatia)	72–66	(France) Limoges CSP

- Group F standings:

Pos.	Team	Pld.	Pts.	W	L	PF	PA	PD
1.	(Italy) Teamsystem Bologna	16	28	12	4	1262	1163	+99
2.	(Croatia) Cibona	16	26	10	6	1166	1126	+40
3.	(Spain) Estudiantes Argentaria	16	25	9	7	1309	1284	+25
4.	(France) Limoges CSP	16	24	8	8	1226	1235	-9
5.	(Turkey) Ülker	16	21	5	11	1196	1243	-47
6.	(Greece) Panionios Ethniki Asfalistiki	16	20	4	12	1162	1325	-163

==== Top 16 ====
- Best-of-3 playoff: Game 1 away on March 6, 1997 / Game 2 at home on March 11, 1997 / Game 3 away on March 13, 1997.

Team 1	Agg.	Team 2	1st leg	2nd leg	3rd leg
Panathinaikos (Greece)	2–0	(France) Limoges CSP	68–67	70–55	– – –

=== 1997–98 FIBA EuroLeague, 1st–tier ===
The 1997–98 FIBA EuroLeague was the 41st installment of the European top-tier level professional club competition for basketball clubs (now called simply EuroLeague), running from September 18, 1997, to April 23, 1998. The trophy was won by Kinder Bologna, who defeated AEK by a result of 58–44 at Palau Sant Jordi in Barcelona, Spain. Overall, Limoges CSP achieved in present competition a record of 6 wins against 10 defeats, in two successive rounds. More detailed:

==== First round ====
- Day 1 (September 18, 1997)

Team 1	Score	Team 2
Maccabi Tel Aviv (Israel)	78–62	(France) Limoges CSP

- Day 2 (September 25, 1997)

Team 1	Score	Team 2
Limoges CSP (France)	62–77	(Turkey) Efes Pilsen

- Day 3 (October 2, 1997)

Team 1	Score	Team 2
Olympiacos (Greece)	69–57	(France) Limoges CSP

- Day 4 (October 9, 1997)

Team 1	Score	Team 2
Limoges CSP (France)	70–66	(Russia) CSKA Moscow

- Day 5 (October 23, 1997)

Team 1	Score	Team 2
Limoges CSP (France)	71–85	(Spain) Real Madrid Teka

- Day 6 (November 6, 1997)

Team 1	Score	Team 2
Limoges CSP (France)	78–77	(Israel) Maccabi Tel Aviv

- Day 7 (November 12, 1997)

Team 1	Score	Team 2
Efes Pilsen (Turkey)	65–64	(France) Limoges CSP

- Day 8 (November 20, 1997)

Team 1	Score	Team 2
Limoges CSP (France)	66–60	(Greece) Olympiacos

- Day 9 (December 11, 1997)

Team 1	Score	Team 2
CSKA Moscow (Russia)	83–70	(France) Limoges CSP

- Day 10 (December 18, 1997)

Team 1	Score	Team 2
Real Madrid Teka (Spain)	75–62	(France) Limoges CSP

- Group A standings:

Pos.	Team	Pld.	Pts.	W	L	PF	PA	PD	Tie-break
1.	(Greece) Olympiacos	10	17	7	3	722	702	+20	
2.	(Turkey) Efes Pilsen	10	16	6	4	718	674	+44	
3.	(Israel) Maccabi Tel Aviv	10	15	5	5	747	739	+8	1–1 (+10)
4.	(Russia) CSKA Moscow	10	15	5	5	763	756	+7	1–1 (-10)
5.	(Spain) Real Madrid Teka	10	14	4	6	787	793	–6	
6.	(France) Limoges CSP	10	13	3	7	662	735	–73	

==== Second round ====
- Day 1 (January 8, 1998)

Team 1	Score	Team 2
Limoges CSP (France)	69–68	(Italy) Benetton Treviso

- Day 2 (January 14, 1998)

Team 1	Score	Team 2
PAOK (Greece)	85–76	(France) Limoges CSP

- Day 3 (January 22, 1998)

Team 1	Score	Team 2
Limoges CSP (France)	83–72	(Spain) Estudiantes

- Day 4 (February 5, 1998)

Team 1	Score	Team 2
Benetton Treviso (Italy)	96–70	(France) Limoges CSP

- Day 5 (February 11, 1998)

Team 1	Score	Team 2
Limoges CSP (France)	77–75*	(Greece) PAOK

^{*}Overtime at the end of regulation (64–64).

- Day 6 (February 19, 1998)

Team 1	Score	Team 2
Estudiantes (Spain)	68–62	(France) Limoges CSP

- Group F standings:

Pos.	Team	Pld.	Pts.	W	L	PF	PA	PD	Tie-break
1.	(Italy) Benetton Treviso	16	28	12	4	1213	1100	+113	
2.	(Russia) CSKA Moscow	16	25	9	7	1217	1159	+58	1–1 (+27)
3.	(Greece) PAOK	16	25	9	7	1119	1083	+36	1–1 (-27)
4.	(Spain) Estudiantes	16	24	8	8	1171	1191	-20	
5.	(Spain) Real Madrid Teka	16	23	7	9	1187	1165	+22	
6.	(France) Limoges CSP	16	22	6	10	1099	1199	-100	

=== 1998–99 FIBA Saporta Cup, 2nd–tier ===
The 1998–99 FIBA Saporta Cup was the 33rd installment of FIBA's 2nd-tier level European-wide professional club basketball competition FIBA Saporta Cup, running from September 22, 1998, to April 13, 1999. The trophy was won by Benetton Treviso, who defeated Pamesa Valencia by a result of 64–60 at Pabellón Príncipe Felipe in Zaragoza, Spain. Overall, Limoges CSP achieved in the present competition a record of 8 wins against 4 defeats, in two successive rounds. More detailed:

==== First round ====
- Day 1 (September 22, 1998)

Team 1	Score	Team 2
Limoges CSP (France)	82–60	(Germany) TBB Trier

- Day 2 (September 29, 1998)

Team 1	Score	Team 2
Limoges CSP (France)	61–58	(Sweden) Plannja Basket

- Day 3 (October 6, 1998)

Team 1	Score	Team 2
Aris (Greece)	55–57	(France) Limoges CSP

- Day 4 (October 13, 1998)

Team 1	Score	Team 2
Telindus Racing Antwerpen (Belgium)	79–76	(France) Limoges CSP

- Day 5 (October 20, 1998)

Team 1	Score	Team 2
Limoges CSP (France)	86–60	(Bosnia and Herzegovina) Feal Široki

- Day 6 (November 3, 1998)

Team 1	Score	Team 2
TBB Trier (Germany)	71–68	(France) Limoges CSP

- Day 7 (November 10, 1998)

Team 1	Score	Team 2
Plannja Basket (Sweden)	72–83	(France) Limoges CSP

- Day 8 (November 17, 1998)

Team 1	Score	Team 2
Limoges CSP (France)	73–79	(Greece) Aris

- Day 9 (December 8, 1998)

Team 1	Score	Team 2
Limoges CSP (France)	66–48	(Belgium) Telindus Racing Antwerpen

- Day 10 (December 15, 1998)

Team 1	Score	Team 2
Feal Široki (Bosnia and Herzegovina)	55–59	(France) Limoges CSP

- Group F standings:

Pos.	Team	Pld.	Pts.	W	L	PF	PA	PD
1.	(Greece) Aris	10	19	9	1	799	637	+162
2.	(France) Limoges CSP	10	17	7	3	711	637	+74
3.	(Belgium) Telindus Racing Antwerpen	10	15	5	5	708	736	-28
4.	(Germany) TBB Trier	10	14	4	6	741	781	-40
5.	(Sweden) Plannja Basket	10	13	3	7	756	802	-46
6.	(Bosnia and Herzegovina) Feal Široki	10	12	2	8	653	775	-122

==== Second round ====
- Tie played on January 12, 1999, and on January 19, 1999.

Team 1	Agg.	Team 2	1st leg	2nd leg
Spirou Charleroi (Belgium)	136–130	(France) Limoges CSP	60–61	76–69

== 2000s ==
=== 1999–2000 FIBA Korać Cup, 3rd–tier ===
The 1999–2000 FIBA Korać Cup was the 29th installment of the European 3rd-tier level professional basketball club competition FIBA Korać Cup, running from September 15, 1999, to March 29, 2000. The trophy was won by Limoges CSP, who defeated Unicaja by a result of 131–118 in a two-legged final on a home and away basis. Overall, Limoges CSP achieved in present competition a record of 12 wins against 3 defeats plus 1 draw, in seven successive rounds. More detailed:

==== First round ====
- Bye

==== Second round ====
- Day 1 (October 6, 1999)

Team 1	Score	Team 2
Ovarense Aerosoles (Portugal)	66–80	(France) Limoges CSP

- Day 2 (October 13, 1999)

Team 1	Score	Team 2
Limoges CSP (France)	81–75	(Belgium) Telindus Racing Antwerpen

- Day 3 (October 20, 1999)

Team 1	Score	Team 2
Jabones Pardo Fuenlabrada (Spain)	63–73	(France) Limoges CSP

- Day 4 (November 3, 1999)

Team 1	Score	Team 2
Limoges CSP (France)	93–84	(Portugal) Ovarense Aerosoles

- Day 5 (November 10, 1999)

Team 1	Score	Team 2
Telindus Racing Antwerpen (Belgium)	59–56	(France) Limoges CSP

- Day 6 (November 17, 1999)

Team 1	Score	Team 2
Limoges CSP (France)	90–77	(Spain) Jabones Pardo Fuenlabrada

- Group I standings:

Pos.	Team	Pld.	Pts.	W	L	PF	PA	PD	Tie-break
1.	(France) Limoges CSP	6	11	5	1	473	424	+49	
2.	(Belgium) Telindus Racing Antwerpen	6	9	3	3	414	397	+17	1–1 (+4)
3.	(Spain) Jabones Pardo Fuenlabrada	6	9	3	3	429	433	-4	1–1 (-4)
4.	(Portugal) Ovarense Aerosoles	6	7	1	5	406	468	-62	

==== Third round ====
- Tie played on December 8, 1999, and on December 15, 1999.

Team 1	Agg.	Team 2	1st leg	2nd leg
UNICS (Russia)	133–179	(France) Limoges CSP	64–86	69–93

==== Top 16 ====
- Tie played on January 12, 2000, and on January 19, 2000.

Team 1	Agg.	Team 2	1st leg	2nd leg
Limoges CSP (France)	186–144	(Ukraine) CSKA Kyiv	86–73	100–71

==== Quarterfinals ====
- Tie played on February 9, 2000, and on February 16, 2000.

Team 1	Agg.	Team 2	1st leg	2nd leg
Limoges CSP (France)	138–132	(Turkey) Türk Telekom	71–57	67–75

==== Semifinals ====
- Tie played on March 1, 2000, and on March 8, 2000.

Team 1	Agg.	Team 2	1st leg	2nd leg
Casademont Girona (Spain)	134–146	(France) Limoges CSP	77–77	57–69

==== Finals ====
- Tie played on March 22, 2000, at Palais des Sports de Beaublanc in Limoges, France and on March 29, 2000, at Pabellón Ciudad Jardín in Málaga, Spain.

Team 1	Agg.	Team 2	1st leg	2nd leg
Limoges CSP (France)	131–118	(Spain) Unicaja	80–58	51–60

== 2010s ==
=== 2014–15 Turkish Airlines Euroleague, 1st–tier ===
The 2014–15 Turkish Airlines Euroleague was the 15th season of the EuroLeague, under the Euroleague Basketball Company's authority, and it was the 58th installment of the European top-tier level professional club competition for basketball clubs, running from September 23, 2014, to May 17, 2015. The trophy was won by Real Madrid, who defeated Olympiacos by a result of 78–59 at Barclaycard Center in Madrid, Spain. Overall, Limoges CSP achieved in present competition a record of 2 wins against 8 defeats, in only one round. More detailed:

==== Regular season ====
- Day 1 (October 16, 2014)

Team 1	Score	Team 2
Maccabi Tel Aviv (Israel)	92–76	(France) Limoges CSP

- Day 2 (October 24, 2014)

Team 1	Score	Team 2
Limoges CSP (France)	71–60	(Croatia) Cedevita

- Day 3 (October 31, 2014)

Team 1	Score	Team 2
Unicaja (Spain)	75–69	(France) Limoges CSP

- Day 4 (November 7, 2014)

Team 1	Score	Team 2
Alba Berlin (Germany)	89–66	(France) Limoges CSP

- Day 5 (November 14, 2014)

Team 1	Score	Team 2
Limoges CSP (France)	76–86	(Russia) CSKA Moscow

- Day 6 (November 20, 2014)

Team 1	Score	Team 2
Limoges CSP (France)	73–79	(Israel) Maccabi Tel Aviv

- Day 7 (November 28, 2014)

Team 1	Score	Team 2
Cedevita (Croatia)	102–83	(France) Limoges CSP

- Day 8 (December 5, 2014)

Team 1	Score	Team 2
Limoges CSP (France)	67–64	(Spain) Unicaja

- Day 9 (December 12, 2014)

Team 1	Score	Team 2
Limoges CSP (France)	65–71	(Germany) Alba Berlin

- Day 10 (December 18, 2014)

Team 1	Score	Team 2
CSKA Moscow (Russia)	88–56	(France) Limoges CSP

- Group B standings:

Pos.	Team	Pld.	W	L	PF	PA	PD	Tie-break
1.	(Russia) CSKA Moscow	10	10	0	880	718	+162	
2.	(Israel) Maccabi Tel Aviv	10	7	3	797	783	+14	
3.	(Spain) Unicaja	10	4	6	763	757	+6	1–1 (+2)
4.	(Germany) Alba Berlin	10	4	6	762	791	-29	1–1 (-2)
5.	(Croatia) Cedevita	10	3	7	740	789	-49	
6.	(France) Limoges CSP	10	2	8	702	806	-104	

Bottom two teams in each group entered 2014–15 Eurocup Basketball Last 32 round.

==== 2014–15 Eurocup Basketball, 2nd–tier ====
The 2014–15 Eurocup Basketball was the 13th installment of ULEB's 2nd-tier level European-wide professional club basketball competition EuroCup Basketball, running from October 15, 2014, to April 29, 2015. The trophy was won by Khimki, who defeated Herbalife Gran Canaria by a result of 174–130 in a two-legged final on a home and away basis. Overall, Limoges CSP achieved in the present competition a record of 3 wins against 3 defeats, in only one round. More detailed:

===== Last 32 =====
- Day 1 (January 7, 2015)

Team 1	Score	Team 2
Limoges CSP (France)	71–59	(Greece) PAOK

- Day 2 (January 14, 2015)

Team 1	Score	Team 2
Khimki (Russia)	79–70	(France) Limoges CSP

- Day 3 (January 20, 2015)

Team 1	Score	Team 2
Limoges CSP (France)	81–70	(Italy) FoxTown Cantù

- Day 4 (January 28, 2015)

Team 1	Score	Team 2
FoxTown Cantù (Italy)	68–57	(France) Limoges CSP

- Day 5 (February 4, 2015)

Team 1	Score	Team 2
PAOK (Greece)	68–79	(France) Limoges CSP

- Day 6 (February 10, 2015)

Team 1	Score	Team 2
Limoges CSP (France)	72–86	(Russia) Khimki

- Group J standings:

Pos.	Team	Pld.	W	L	PF	PA	PD	Tie-break
1.	(Russia) Khimki	6	5	1	512	449	+63	
2.	(Italy) FoxTown Cantù	6	3	3	454	449	+5	1–1 (0)
3.	(France) Limoges CSP	6	3	3	430	430	0	1–1 (0)
4.	(Greece) PAOK	6	1	5	421	489	-68	

=== 2015–16 Turkish Airlines Euroleague, 1st–tier ===
The 2015–16 Turkish Airlines Euroleague was the 16th season of the EuroLeague, under the Euroleague Basketball Company's authority, and it was the 59th installment of the European top-tier level professional club competition for basketball clubs, running from October 15, 2015, to May 15, 2016. The trophy was won by CSKA Moscow, who defeated Fenerbahçe by a result of 101–96 (OT) at Mercedes-Benz Arena in Berlin, Germany. Overall, Limoges CSP achieved in present competition a record of 3 wins against 7 defeats, in only one round. More detailed:

==== Regular season ====
- Day 1 (October 16, 2015)

Team 1	Score	Team 2
Limoges CSP (France)	77–89	(Turkey) Anadolu Efes

- Day 2 (October 22, 2015)

Team 1	Score	Team 2
Cedevita (Croatia)	80–84	(France) Limoges CSP

- Day 3 (October 29, 2015)

Team 1	Score	Team 2
Limoges CSP (France)	71–107	(Spain) Laboral Kutxa

- Day 4 (November 5, 2015)

Team 1	Score	Team 2
Olympiacos (Greece)	75–49	(France) Limoges CSP

- Day 5 (November 12, 2015)

Team 1	Score	Team 2
Limoges CSP (France)	74–65	(Italy) EA7 Emporio Armani Milan

- Day 6 (November 20, 2015)

Team 1	Score	Team 2
Anadolu Efes (Turkey)	92–74	(France) Limoges CSP

- Day 7 (November 26, 2015)

Team 1	Score	Team 2
Limoges CSP (France)	69–78	(Croatia) Cedevita

- Day 8 (December 3, 2015)

Team 1	Score	Team 2
Laboral Kutxa (Spain)	92–56	(France) Limoges CSP

- Day 9 (December 10, 2015)

Team 1	Score	Team 2
Limoges CSP (France)	67–76	(Greece) Olympiacos

- Day 10 (December 18, 2015)

Team 1	Score	Team 2
EA7 Emporio Armani Milan (Italy)	69–77	(France) Limoges CSP

- Group B standings:

Pos.	Team	Pld.	W	L	PF	PA	PD	Tie-break
1.	(Greece) Olympiacos	10	8	2	761	692	+69	
2.	(Turkey) Anadolu Efes	10	6	4	863	805	+58	1–1 (+7)
3.	(Spain) Laboral Kutxa	10	6	4	854	766	+88	1–1 (-7)
4.	(Croatia) Cedevita	10	4	6	750	780	-30	
5.	(France) Limoges CSP	10	3	7	698	823	-125	2–0
6.	(Italy) EA7 Emporio Armani Milan	10	3	7	737	797	-60	0–2

Bottom two teams in each group entered 2015–16 Eurocup Basketball Last 32 round.

==== 2015–16 Eurocup Basketball, 2nd–tier ====
The 2015–16 Eurocup Basketball was the 14th installment of ULEB's 2nd-tier level European-wide professional club basketball competition EuroCup Basketball, running from October 14, 2015, to April 27, 2016. The trophy was won by Galatasaray Odeabank, who defeated SIG Strasbourg by a result of 140–133 in a two-legged final on a home and away basis. Overall, Limoges CSP achieved in the present competition a record of 4 wins against 4 defeats, in two successive rounds. More detailed:

===== Last 32 =====
- Day 1 (January 5, 2016)

Team 1	Score	Team 2
Limoges CSP (France)	78–87	(Germany) EWE Baskets Oldenburg

- Day 2 (January 12, 2016)

Team 1	Score	Team 2
PAOK (Greece)	88–75	(France) Limoges CSP

- Day 3 (January 19, 2016)

Team 1	Score	Team 2
Valencia Basket (Spain)	72–92	(France) Limoges CSP

- Day 4 (January 26, 2016)

Team 1	Score	Team 2
Limoges CSP (France)	82–67	(Spain) Valencia Basket

- Day 5 (February 3, 2016)

Team 1	Score	Team 2
EWE Baskets Oldenburg (Germany)	92–88	(France) Limoges CSP

- Day 6 (February 10, 2016)

Team 1	Score	Team 2
Limoges CSP (France)	79–61	(Greece) PAOK

- Group I standings:

Pos.	Team	Pld.	W	L	PF	PA	PD	Tie-break
1.	(Germany) EWE Baskets Oldenburg	6	4	2	494	490	+4	
2.	(France) Limoges CSP	6	3	3	494	467	+27	2–0
3.	(Spain) Valencia Basket	6	3	3	474	462	+12	0–2
4.	(Greece) PAOK	6	2	4	425	468	-43	

===== Top 16 =====
- Tie played on February 24, 2016, and on March 2, 2016.

Team 1	Agg.	Team 2	1st leg	2nd leg
Limoges CSP (France)	143–159	(Spain) Herbalife Gran Canaria	65–82	78–77

=== 2017–18 EuroCup Basketball, 2nd–tier ===
The 2017–18 EuroCup Basketball was the 16th installment of ULEB's 2nd-tier level European-wide professional club basketball competition EuroCup Basketball, running from October 11, 2017, to April 13, 2018. The trophy was won by Darüşşafaka, who defeated Lokomotiv Kuban by a result of 2–0 wins in a Best-of-3 final series. Overall, Limoges CSP achieved in the present competition a record of 6 wins against 10 defeats, in two successive rounds. More detailed:

==== Regular season ====
- Day 1 (October 11, 2017)

Team 1	Score	Team 2
Limoges CSP (France)	61–63	(Russia) Lokomotiv Kuban

- Day 2 (October 18, 2017)

Team 1	Score	Team 2
RETAbet Bilbao Basket (Spain)	91–98	(France) Limoges CSP

- Day 3 (October 24, 2017)

Team 1	Score	Team 2
Limoges CSP (France)	65–73	(Germany) Alba Berlin

- Day 4 (October 31, 2017)

Team 1	Score	Team 2
Limoges CSP (France)	92–83	(Serbia) Partizan NIS

- Day 5 (November 7, 2017)

Team 1	Score	Team 2
Lietuvos rytas (Lithuania)	92–76	(France) Limoges CSP

- Day 6 (November 15, 2017)

Team 1	Score	Team 2
Lokomotiv Kuban (Russia)	81–55	(France) Limoges CSP

- Day 7 (December 5, 2017)

Team 1	Score	Team 2
Limoges CSP (France)	86–74	(Spain) RETAbet Bilbao Basket

- Day 8 (December 12, 2017)

Team 1	Score	Team 2
Alba Berlin (Germany)	78–84	(France) Limoges CSP

- Day 9 (December 19, 2017)

Team 1	Score	Team 2
Partizan NIS (Serbia)	98–101	(France) Limoges CSP

- Day 10 (December 26, 2017)

Team 1	Score	Team 2
Limoges CSP (France)	69–71	(Lithuania) Lietuvos rytas

- Group C standings:

Pos.	Team	Pld.	W	L	PF	PA	PD	Tie-break
1.	(Russia) Lokomotiv Kuban	10	10	0	851	710	+141	
2.	(Lithuania) Lietuvos rytas	10	6	4	855	796	+59	1–1 (+14)
3.	(Germany) Alba Berlin	10	6	4	847	812	+35	1–1 (-14)
4.	(France) Limoges CSP	10	5	5	787	804	-17	
5.	(Spain) RETAbet Bilbao Basket	10	2	8	821	899	-78	
6.	(Serbia) Partizan NIS	10	1	9	811	951	-140	

Rules for classification: All points scored in extra period(s) were not counted in the standings, nor for any tie-break situation.

==== Top 16 ====
- Day 1 (January 2, 2018)

Team 1	Score	Team 2
Grissin Bon Reggio Emilia (Italy)	87–54	(France) Limoges CSP

- Day 2 (January 9, 2018)

Team 1	Score	Team 2
Limoges CSP (France)	66–69	(Russia) UNICS

- Day 3 (January 17, 2018)

Team 1	Score	Team 2
ASVEL (France)	92–78	(France) Limoges CSP

- Day 4 (January 24, 2018)

Team 1	Score	Team 2
Limoges CSP (France)	61–87	(France) ASVEL

- Day 5 (January 30, 2018)

Team 1	Score	Team 2
Limoges CSP (France)	80–71	(Italy) Grissin Bon Reggio Emilia

- Day 6 (February 7, 2018)

Team 1	Score	Team 2
UNICS (Russia)	88–78	(France) Limoges CSP

- Group H standings:

Pos.	Team	Pld.	W	L	PF	PA	PD	Tie-break
1.	(Italy) Grissin Bon Reggio Emilia	6	4	2	444	414	+30	2–0
2.	(Russia) UNICS	6	4	2	447	437	+10	0–2
3.	(France) ASVEL	6	3	3	461	424	+37	
4.	(France) Limoges CSP	6	1	5	417	494	-77	

Rules for classification: All points scored in extra period(s) were not counted in the standings, nor for any tie-break situation.

=== 2018–19 EuroCup Basketball, 2nd–tier ===
The 2018–19 EuroCup Basketball was the 17th installment of ULEB's 2nd-tier level European-wide professional club basketball competition EuroCup Basketball, running from October 3, 2018, to April 15, 2019. The trophy was won by Valencia Basket, who defeated Alba Berlin by a result of 2–1 wins in a Best-of-3 final series. Overall, Limoges CSP achieved in the present competition a record of 5 wins against 11 defeats, in two successive rounds. More detailed:

==== Regular season ====
- Day 1 (October 3, 2018)

Team 1	Score	Team 2
Limoges CSP (France)	82–68	(Croatia) Cedevita

- Day 2 (October 10, 2018)

Team 1	Score	Team 2
Lokomotiv Kuban (Russia)	82–64	(France) Limoges CSP

- Day 3 (October 17, 2018)

Team 1	Score	Team 2
Limoges CSP (France)	93–102	(Germany) Alba Berlin

- Day 4 (October 23, 2018)

Team 1	Score	Team 2
Limoges CSP (France)	89–81	(Turkey) Tofaş

- Day 5 (October 31, 2018)

Team 1	Score	Team 2
Asseco Arka Gdynia (Poland)	87–78	(France) Limoges CSP

- Day 6 (November 7, 2018)

Team 1	Score	Team 2
Cedevita (Croatia)	91–71	(France) Limoges CSP

- Day 7 (November 14, 2018)

Team 1	Score	Team 2
Limoges CSP (France)	64–72	(Russia) Lokomotiv Kuban

- Day 8 (November 21, 2018)

Team 1	Score	Team 2
Alba Berlin (Germany)	84–76	(France) Limoges CSP

- Day 9 (December 11, 2018)

Team 1	Score	Team 2
Tofaş (Turkey)	92–98	(France) Limoges CSP

- Day 10 (December 19, 2018)

Team 1	Score	Team 2
Limoges CSP (France)	103–87	(Poland) Asseco Arka Gdynia

- Group B standings:

Pos.	Team	Pld.	W	L	PF	PA	PD	Tie-break
1.	(Russia) Lokomotiv Kuban	10	9	1	847	757	+90	
2.	(Germany) Alba Berlin	10	7	3	883	835	+48	
3.	(Croatia) Cedevita	10	5	5	853	831	+22	
4.	(France) Limoges CSP	10	4	6	818	846	-28	2–0
5.	(Turkey) Tofaş	10	4	6	891	908	-17	0–2
6.	(Poland) Asseco Arka Gdynia	10	1	9	755	870	-115	

Rules for classification: All points scored in extra period(s) were not counted in the standings, nor for any tie-break situation.

==== Top 16 ====
- Day 1 (January 2, 2019)

Team 1	Score	Team 2
Crvena zvezda mts (Serbia)	83–71	(France) Limoges CSP

- Day 2 (January 9, 2019)

Team 1	Score	Team 2
Limoges CSP (France)	74–79	(Spain) Valencia Basket

- Day 3 (January 15, 2019)

Team 1	Score	Team 2
Unicaja (Spain)	79–72	(France) Limoges CSP

- Day 4 (January 23, 2019)

Team 1	Score	Team 2
Limoges CSP (France)	77–78	(Spain) Unicaja

- Day 5 (January 29, 2019)

Team 1	Score	Team 2
Limoges CSP (France)	72–71	(Serbia) Crvena zvezda mts

- Day 6 (February 6, 2019)

Team 1	Score	Team 2
Valencia Basket (Spain)	91–84	(France) Limoges CSP

- Group G standings:

Pos.	Team	Pld.	W	L	PF	PA	PD
1.	(Spain) Valencia Basket	6	6	0	501	458	+43
2.	(Spain) Unicaja	6	3	3	468	485	-17
3.	(Serbia) Crvena zvezda mts	6	2	4	490	485	+5
4.	(France) Limoges CSP	6	1	5	450	481	-31

Rules for classification: All points scored in extra period(s) were not counted in the standings, nor for any tie-break situation.

== Worldwide and other prestigious (semi-official) European competitions ==
=== 1985 III ACB International Tournament "II Memorial Héctor Quiroga" ===
The 1985 III ACB International Tournament "II Memorial Héctor Quiroga" was the 3rd semi-official installment of the European Basketball Club Super Cup for men's professional basketball clubs, running from September 6, 1985, to September 8, 1985. It took place at Pabellón Municipal in Puerto Real and the trophy was won by Winston All Star.

==== Round-robin tournament ====
- Day 1 (September 6, 1985)

Team 1	Score	Team 2
Limoges CSP (France)	105–93	(Italy) Simac Milano

- Day 2 (September 7, 1985)

Team 1	Score	Team 2
Real Madrid (Spain)	79–80	(France) Limoges CSP

- Day 3 (September 8, 1985)

Team 1	Score	Team 2
Winston All Star (United States)	101–97	(France) Limoges CSP

- Final standings:

Pos.	Team	Pld.	Pts.	W	L	PF	PA	PD	Tie-break
1.	(United States) Winston All Star	3	5	2	1	304	300	+4	1–0
2.	(France) Limoges CSP	3	5	2	1	282	273	+9	0–1
3.	(Italy) Simac Milano	3	4	1	2	276	293	-17	1–0
4.	(Spain) Real Madrid	3	4	1	2	289	285	+4	0–1

=== 1990 XXVI FIBA International Christmas Tournament ===
The 1990 XXVI FIBA International Christmas Tournament "Trofeo Raimundo Saporta-Memorial Fernando Martín" was the 26th installment of the international men's professional basketball club tournament FIBA International Christmas Tournament, running from December 24, 1990, to December 26, 1990. It took place at Palacio de Deportes de la Comunidad de Madrid in Madrid, Spain and the trophy was won by Real Madrid Otaysa.

==== Round-robin tournament ====
- Day 1 (December 24, 1990)

Team 1	Score	Team 2
Real Madrid Otaysa (Spain)	83–90	(France) Limoges CSP

- Day 2 (December 25, 1990)

Team 1	Score	Team 2
POP 84 (Socialist Federal Republic of Yugoslavia)	84–74	(France) Limoges CSP

- Day 3 (December 26, 1990)

Team 1	Score	Team 2
Maccabi Tel Aviv (Israel)	93–82	(France) Limoges CSP

- Final standings:

Pos.	Team	Pld.	Pts.	W	L	PF	PA	PD	Tie-break
1.	(Spain) Real Madrid Otaysa	3	5	2	1	267	242	+25	1–0
2.	(Socialist Federal Republic of Yugoslavia) POP 84	3	5	2	1	275	246	+29	0–1
3.	(Israel) Maccabi Tel Aviv	3	4	1	2	257	297	-40	1–0
4.	(France) Limoges CSP	3	4	1	2	246	260	-14	0–1

=== 1991 McDonald's Open ===
The 1991 McDonald's Open was the 5th installment of the international men's professional basketball club tournament McDonald's Open (lately called McDonald's Championship), running from October 18, 1991, to October 19, 1991. It took place at Palais Omnisports de Paris-Bercy in Paris, France and the trophy was won by Los Angeles Lakers, who defeated Montigalà Joventut by a result of 116–114.

==== Semifinals ====
- 18 October 1991 at Palais Omnisports de Paris-Bercy in Paris, France.

Team 1	Score	Team 2
Los Angeles Lakers (United States)	132–101	(France) Limoges CSP

==== 3rd place game ====
- 19 October 1991 at Palais Omnisports de Paris-Bercy in Paris, France.

Team 1	Score	Team 2
Slobodna Dalmacija (Croatia)	91–105	(France) Limoges CSP

- Final standings:

Pos.	Team	Rec.
	(United States) Los Angeles Lakers	2–0
Silver medal	(Spain) Montigalà Joventut	1–1
Bronze medal	(France) Limoges CSP	1–1
4th	(Croatia) Slobodna Dalmacija	0–2

=== 1993 McDonald's Open ===
The 1993 McDonald's Open was the 6th installment of the international men's professional basketball club tournament McDonald's Open (lately called McDonald's Championship), running from October 21, 1993, to October 23, 1993. It took place at Olympiahalle in Munich, Germany and the trophy was won by Phoenix Suns, who defeated Buckler Beer Bologna by a result of 112–90.

==== Preliminary round ====
- October 21, 1993, at Olympiahalle in Munich, Germany.

Bye

==== Semifinals ====
- October 22, 1993, at Olympiahalle in Munich, Germany.

Team 1	Score	Team 2
Limoges CSP (France)	85–101	(Italy) Buckler Beer Bologna

==== 3rd place game ====
- October 23, 1993, at Olympiahalle in Munich, Germany.

Team 1	Score	Team 2
Real Madrid Teka (Spain)	123–119	(France) Limoges CSP

- Final standings:

Pos.	Club	Rec.
	(United States) Phoenix Suns	2–0
Silver medal	(Italy) Buckler Beer Bologna	2–1
Bronze medal	(Spain) Real Madrid Teka	2–1
4.	(France) Limoges CSP	0–2
5.	(Brazil) All-Star Franca	1–1
6.	(Germany) Bayer 04 Leverkusen	0–2

== Record ==
Limoges CSP has overall, from 1981–82 (first participation) to 2015–16 (last participation): 168 wins against 126 defeats plus 2 draws in 296 games for all the European club competitions.

- EuroLeague: 90–92 plus 1 (183)
  - FIBA Saporta Cup: 36–15 (51) /// EuroCup Basketball: 7–7 (14)
    - FIBA Korać Cup: 35–12 plus 1 (48)

Also Limoges has a 1–3 record in the McDonald's Championship.
