= Virtus Bologna in international competitions =

Virtus Bologna history and statistics in FIBA Europe and Euroleague Basketball (company) competitions.

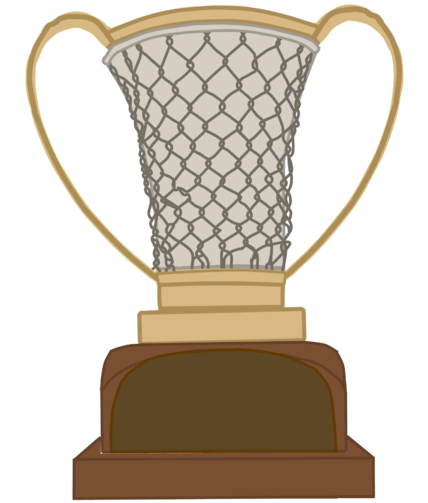
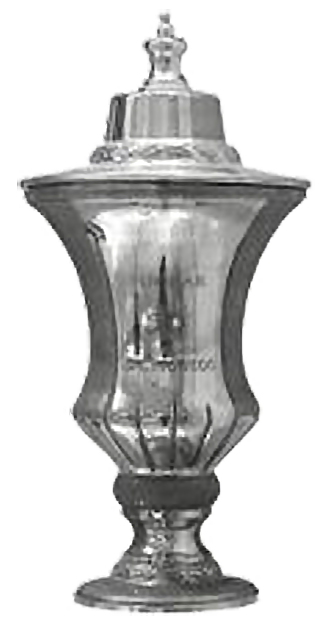

== European competitions ==
Record	Round	Opponent club					
1960–61 FIBA European Champions Cup 1st–tier
3–1	1st round	(Switzerland) Urania Genève Sport	68–62 (a)	96–45 (h)			
3–1	2nd round	(Romania) Steaua București	70–56 (h)	54–70 (a)			
1974–75 FIBA European Cup Winner's Cup 2nd–tier
4–4	2nd round	(Israel) Maccabi Ramat Gan	94–114 (a)	88–62 (h)			
4–4	QF	(Soviet Union) Spartak Leningrad	70–93 (a)	69–58 (h)			
4–4	QF	(France) Moderne	85–64 (h)	88–89 (a)			
4–4	QF	(Socialist Federal Republic of Yugoslavia) Jugoplastika	81–78 (h)	74–87 (a)			
1975–76 FIBA Korać Cup 3rd–tier
8–2	2nd round	(Austria) Maximarkt Wels	89–71 (a)	93–80 (h)			
8–2	Top 16	(Bulgaria) Cherno More	80–71 (a)	97–73 (h)			
8–2	Top 16	(Socialist Federal Republic of Yugoslavia) Partizan	82–99 (a)	98–75 (h)			
8–2	Top 16	(West Germany) 04 Leverkusen	106–70 (h)	101–97 (a)			
8–2	SF	(Socialist Federal Republic of Yugoslavia) Jugoplastika	83–74 (a)	79–92 (h)			
1976–77 FIBA European Champions Cup 1st–tier
3–3	1st round	(Romania) Dinamo București	77–68 (h)	96–99 (a)			
3–3	1st round	(Greece) Olympiacos	87–64 (h)	79–81 (a)			
3–3	1st round	(Israel) Maccabi Elite	81–110 (a)	76–60 (h)			
1977–78 FIBA European Cup Winner's Cup 2nd–tier
6–5	2nd round	(Greece) Olympiacos	72–78 (a)	78–61 (h)			
6–5	QF	(Spain) FC Barcelona	89–72 (h)	86–94 (a)			
6–5	QF	(Sweden) Södertälje	92–90 (h)	83–73 (a)			
6–5	QF	(Romania) Steaua București	101–110 (a)	99–76 (h)			
6–5	SF	(France) Caen	98–78 (h)	80–86 (a)			
6–5	F	(Italy) Gabetti Cantù	82–84; March 29, PalaLido, Milan				
1978–79 FIBA European Cup Winner's Cup 2nd–tier
5–3	2nd round	Bye	Sinudyne qualified without games				
5–3	QF	(Spain) FC Barcelona	81–95 (a)	86–73 (h)			
5–3	QF	(Socialist Federal Republic of Yugoslavia) Radnički Belgrade	95–96 (a)	94–81 (h)			
5–3	QF	(Austria) UBSC Wien	89–68 (h)	94–86 (a)			
5–3	SF	(Netherlands) EBBC	85–73 (h)	92–105 (a)			
1979–80 FIBA European Champions Cup 1st–tier
9–5	1st round	(Czechoslovakia) Inter Slovnaft	109–91 (a)	81–71 (h)			
9–5	1st round	(Luxembourg) Sparta Bertrange	90–48 (h)	84–53 (a)			
9–5	SF	(Spain) Real Madrid	85–94 (h)	81–101 (a)			
9–5	SF	(Netherlands) Nashua EBBC	77–70 (h)	76–80 (a)			
9–5	SF	(Israel) Maccabi Elite	73–100 (a)	89–77 (h)			
9–5	SF	(Socialist Federal Republic of Yugoslavia) Partizan	96–70 (a)	90–84 (h)			
9–5	SF	(Socialist Federal Republic of Yugoslavia) Bosna	79–76 (h)	85–89 (a)			
1980–81 FIBA European Champions Cup 1st–tier
13–4	1st round	(Albania) Partizani Tirana	97–79 (a)	112–67 (h)			
13–4	1st round	(Turkey) Eczacıbaşı	111–79 (h)	78–75 (a)			
13–4	1st round	(Bulgaria) CSKA Sofia	106–75 (h)	90–86 (a)			
13–4	SF	(Soviet Union) CSKA Moscow	78–66 (a)	85–72 (h)			
13–4	SF	(Israel) Maccabi Elite	74–73 (h)	88–92 (a)			
13–4	SF	(Socialist Federal Republic of Yugoslavia) Bosna	92–85 (h)	105–101 (a)			
13–4	SF	(Spain) Real Madrid	91–88 (a)	88–83 (h)			
13–4	SF	(Netherlands) Nashua EBBC	85–86 (a)	78–91 (h)			
13–4	F	(Israel) Maccabi Elite	79–80; March 26, Hall Rhénus, Strasbourg				
1981–82 FIBA European Cup Winner's Cup 2nd–tier
4–4	2nd round	Bye	Sinudyne qualified without games				
4–4	QF	(Israel) Hapoel Ramat Gan	99–84 (h)	72–83 (a)			
4–4	QF	(Socialist Federal Republic of Yugoslavia) Cibona	91–121 (a)	88–81 (h)			
4–4	QF	(England) Sutton & Crystal Palace	97–91 (a)	77–68 (h)			
4–4	SF	(Spain) Real Madrid	78–79 (h)	94–107 (a)			
1984–85 FIBA European Champions Cup 1st–tier
5–9	1st round	(Hungary) Honvéd	94–93 (a)	96–77 (h)			
5–9	2nd round	(Greece) Panathinaikos	85–88 (a)	98–67 (h)			
5–9	SF	(Soviet Union) CSKA Moscow	84–102 (a)	83–94 (h)			
5–9	SF	(Socialist Federal Republic of Yugoslavia) Cibona	81–72 (h)	89–96 (a)			
5–9	SF	(Italy) Banco di Roma Virtus	72–73 (h)	84–93 (a)			
5–9	SF	(Spain) Real Madrid	90–95 (a)	87–98 (h)			
5–9	SF	(Israel) Maccabi Elite	76–90 (a)	94–86 (h)			
1987–88 FIBA Korać Cup 3rd–tier
6–2	2nd round	(Czechoslovakia) Nová huť Ostrava	89–63 (a)	110–81 (h)			
6–2	Top 16	(Spain) Real Madrid	62–76 (a)	80–81 (h)			
6–2	Top 16	(France) Monaco	94–86 (a)	97–82 (h)			
6–2	Top 16	(Israel) Elitzur Netanya	90–81 (h)	92–86 (a)			
1989–90 FIBA European Cup Winner's Cup 2nd–tier
8–3	2nd round	(Turkey) Çukurova Üniversitesi	71–72 (a)	108–64 (h)			
8–3	QF	(Soviet Union) Žalgiris	102–79 (h)	86–83 (a)			
8–3	QF	(Belgium) Sunair Oostende	78–69 (a)	93–85 (h)			
8–3	QF	(Israel) Maccabi Ramat Gan	95–96 (a)	86–73 (h)			
8–3	SF	(Greece) PAOK	77–57 (h)	94–100 (a)			
8–3	F	(Spain) Real Madrid	79–74; March 13, PalaGiglio, Florence				
1990–91 FIBA European Cup Winner's Cup 2nd–tier
6–2	2nd round	(Romania) Balanța Sibiu	105–69 (a)	113–72 (h)			
6–2	QF	(Soviet Union) Dynamo Moscow	95–90 (h)	78–98 (a)			
6–2	QF	(Portugal) Ovarense	71–69 (a)	88–68 (h)			
6–2	QF	(France) Pitch Cholet	82–104 (a)	103–80 (h)			
1991–92 FIBA European League 1st–tier
13–6	2nd round	(Cyprus) Pezoporikos Larnaca	109–88 (a)	124–74 (h)			
13–6	Top 16	(Croatia) Slobodna Dalmacija	85–80 (h)	95–99 (a)			
13–6	Top 16	(Estonia) Kalev	87–80 (a)	90–87 (h)			
13–6	Top 16	(Spain) FC Barcelona	67–71 (a)	77–74 (h)			
13–6	Top 16	(Italy) Phonola Caserta	77–72 (a)	95–78 (h)			
13–6	Top 16	(France) Olympique Antibes	106–81 (h)	103–78 (a)			
13–6	Top 16	(Croatia) Cibona	74–87 (a)	94–97 (h)			
13–6	Top 16	(Israel) Maccabi Elite	96–83 (h)	83–81 (a)			
13–6	QF	(Federal Republic of Yugoslavia) Partizan	65–78 (a)	61–60 (h)	65–69 (h)		
1992–93 FIBA European League 1st–tier
8–8	2nd round	(Ukraine) Budivelnyk	114–80 (a)	96–85 (h)			
8–8	Top 16	(Croatia) Cibona	66–82 (a)	109–69 (h)			
8–8	Top 16	(Italy) Scavolini Pesaro	71–73 (h)	80–83 (a)			
8–8	Top 16	(France) Limoges	76–63 (a)	70–67 (h)			
8–8	Top 16	(Federal Republic of Yugoslavia) Partizan	Partizan withdrew without games				
8–8	Top 16	(Greece) PAOK	64–75 (h)	62–64 (a)			
8–8	Top 16	(Israel) Maccabi Elite	82–80 (a)	90–71 (h)			
8–8	Top 16	(Spain) Joventut Marbella	95–85 (h)	73–81 (a)			
8–8	QF	(Spain) Real Madrid	56–76 (h)	58–79 (a)	– (a)		
1993–94 FIBA European League 1st–tier
10–7	2nd round	Bye	Buckler qualified without games				
10–7	Top 16	(Croatia) Cibona	114–86 (h)	76–78 (a)			
10–7	Top 16	(Spain) 7up Joventut	66–80 (a)	73–65 (h)			
10–7	Top 16	(France) Pau-Orthez	76–61 (h)	79–70 (a)			
10–7	Top 16	(Portugal) Benfica	90–102 (a)	97–57 (h)			
10–7	Top 16	(Turkey) Efes Pilsen	85–65 (h)	77–83 (a)			
10–7	Top 16	(Italy) Clear Cantù	71–60 (a)	88–57 (h)			
10–7	Top 16	(Greece) Panathinaikos	72–85 (h)	75–68 (a)			
10–7	QF	(Greece) Olympiacos	77–64 (h)	69–89 (a)	62–65 (a)		
1994–95 FIBA European League 1st–tier
11–8	2nd round	(England) Thames Valley Tigers	82–62 (a)	98–76 (h)			
11–8	Top 16	(Germany) Bayer 04 Leverkusen	94–80 (h)	80–87 (a)			
11–8	Top 16	(France) Limoges	60–68 (a)	74–59 (h)			
11–8	Top 16	(Croatia) Cibona	79–75 (a)	84–86 (h)			
11–8	Top 16	(Spain) FC Barcelona	102–90 (h)	70–76 (a)			
11–8	Top 16	(Turkey) Efes Pilsen	48–54 (a)	68–54 (h)			
11–8	Top 16	(Greece) Olympiacos	72–68 (h)	64–89 (a)			
11–8	Top 16	(Spain) 7up Joventut	96–77 (h)	81–60 (a)			
11–8	QF	(Greece) Panathinaikos	78–65 (h)	55–63 (a)	56–99 (a)		
1995–96 FIBA European League 1st–tier
8–8	2nd round	(Estonia) Kalev	81–65 (a)	91–83 (h)			
8–8	Top 16	(Spain) FC Barcelona	90–73 (h)	88–89 (a)			
8–8	Top 16	(Croatia) Cibona	72–79 (a)	95–73 (h)			
8–8	Top 16	(France) Pau-Orthez	99–102 (h)	69–74 (a)			
8–8	Top 16	(Portugal) Benfica	85–83 (a)	97–81 (h)			
8–8	Top 16	(Israel) Maccabi Elite	95–77 (h)	86–83 (a)			
8–8	Top 16	(Greece) Panathinaikos	69–72 (h)	69–72 (a)			
8–8	Top 16	(Spain) Real Madrid	71–76 (a)	96–115 (h)			
1996–97 FIBA EuroLeague 1st–tier
8–11	1st round	(Turkey) Efes Pilsen	60–75 (a)	75–89 (h)			
8–11	1st round	(Russia) Dynamo Moscow	78–64 (a)	89–74 (h)			
8–11	1st round	(Spain) Caja San Fernando	93–75 (h)	64–72 (a)			
8–11	1st round	(Federal Republic of Yugoslavia) Partizan	100–83 (h)	70–78 (a)			
8–11	1st round	(France) Pau-Orthez	83–89 (a)	86–74 (h)			
8–11	2nd round	(Spain) FC Barcelona	72–73 (a)	92–103 (h)			
8–11	2nd round	(Germany) Bayer 04 Leverkusen	90–100 (h)	79–85 (a)			
8–11	2nd round	Croatia Osiguranje	70–68 (a)	73–57 (h)			
8–11	Top 16	(Italy) Stefanel Milano	59–67 (a)	83–76 (h)	76–78 (a)		
1997–98 FIBA EuroLeague 1st–tier
19–3	1st round	(Israel) Hapoel Jerusalem	81–68 (a)	73–51 (h)			
19–3	1st round	(France) Pau-Orthez	72–79 (h)	67–65 (a)			
19–3	1st round	(Spain) FC Barcelona	84–71 (a)	83–70 (h)			
19–3	1st round	(Federal Republic of Yugoslavia) Partizan	77–72 (h)	74–49 (a)			
19–3	1st round	(Turkey) Ülker	94–64 (h)	68–66 (a)			
19–3	2nd round	(France) PSG Racing	72–62 (a)	69–52 (h)			
19–3	2nd round	(Slovenia) Union Olimpija	72–62 (h)	60–76 (a)			
19–3	2nd round	(Germany) Alba Berlin	81–66 (h)	69–85 (a)			
19–3	Top 16	(Spain) Estudiantes	86–62 (h)	67–62 (a)	– (h)		
19–3	QF	(Italy) Teamsystem Bologna	64–52 (h)	58–56 (a)	– (h)		
19–3	SF	(Federal Republic of Yugoslavia) Partizan	83–61; April 21, Palau Sant Jordi, Barcelona				
19–3	F	(Greece) AEK	58–44; April 23, Palau Sant Jordi, Barcelona				
1998–99 FIBA EuroLeague 1st–tier
15–8	1st round	(Greece) Olympiacos	67–72 (h)	50–55 (a)			
15–8	1st round	(Croatia) Zadar	65–55 (a)	62–53 (h)			
15–8	1st round	(Germany) Alba Berlin	78–52 (h)	72–75 (a)			
15–8	1st round	(Russia) CSKA Moscow	70–62 (a)	86–65 (h)			
15–8	1st round	(Turkey) Ülker	66–49 (h)	60–49 (a)			
15–8	2nd round	(Greece) PAOK	57–71 (a)	78–56 (h)			
15–8	2nd round	(Italy) Teamsystem Bologna	72–74 (h)	65–67 (a)			
15–8	2nd round	(Russia) CSK VVS Samara	71–61 (a)	80–58 (h)			
15–8	Top 16	(Israel) Maccabi Elite	78–57 (h)	70–55 (a)	– (h)		
15–8	QF	(France) Pau-Orthez	59–67 (a)	93–75 (h)	70–54 (a)		
15–8	SF	(Italy) Teamsystem Bologna	62–57; April 20, Olympiahalle, Munich				
15–8	F	(Lithuania) Žalgiris	74–82; April 22, Olympiahalle, Munich				
1999–00 FIBA Saporta Cup 2nd–tier
15–4	1st round	(Hungary) Matáv Pécs	93–61 (a)	96–70 (h)			
15–4	1st round	(Latvia) Ventspils	84–54 (a)	92–65 (h)			
15–4	1st round	(Poland) Zepter Śląsk Idea Wrocław	77–49 (h)	64–51 (a)			
15–4	1st round	(Sweden) Norrköping Dolphins	114–59 (h)	102–77 (a)			
15–4	1st round	(Turkey) Fenerbahçe	77–61 (a)	86–39 (h)			
15–4	2nd round	(Germany) Telekom Baskets Bonn	67–56 (a)	87–69 (h)			
15–4	Top 16	(Germany) Skyliners Frankfurt	57–62 (a)	83–53 (h)			
15–4	QF	(Spain) Pamesa Valencia	85–61 (h)	59–78 (a)			
15–4	SF	(Lithuania) Lietuvos Rytas	60–70 (a)	83–71 (h)			
15–4	F	(Greece) AEK	76–83; April 11, Centre Intercommunal de Glace de Malley, Lausanne				
2000–01 Euroleague 1st–tier
19–3	Regular season	(Greece) AEK	77–78 (a)	81–66 (h)			
19–3	Regular season	(Croatia) Cibona	106–88 (h)	78–69 (a)			
19–3	Regular season	(Spain) TAU Cerámica	65–59 (a)	76–73 (h)			
19–3	Regular season	(Belgium) Spirou	80–58 (a)	106–87 (h)			
19–3	Regular season	(Russia) Saint Petersburg Lions	84–78 (h)	82–78 (a)			
19–3	Top 16	(Spain) Adecco Estudiantes	113–70 (h)	85–80 (a)	– (h)		
19–3	QF	(Slovenia) Union Olimpija	80–79 (h)	81–79 (a)	– (h)		
19–3	SF	(Italy) Paf Wennington Bologna	103–76 (h)	92–84 (h)	74–70 (a)	– (a)	– (h)
19–3	F	(Spain) TAU Cerámica	65–78 (h)	94–73 (h)	80–60 (a)	79–96 (a)	82–74 (h)
2001–02 Euroleague 1st–tier
17–5	Regular season	(Lithuania) Žalgiris	90–54 (h)	67–91 (a)			
17–5	Regular season	(Spain) FC Barcelona	85–69 (a)	91–81 (h)			
17–5	Regular season	(Turkey) Ülker	68–60 (h)	75–51 (a)			
17–5	Regular season	(Greece) Peristeri	87–59 (a)	87–72 (h)			
17–5	Regular season	(Slovenia) Union Olimpija	86–70 (h)	89–85 (a)			
17–5	Regular season	(United Kingdom) London Towers	94–72 (h)	96–57 (a)			
17–5	Regular season	(Germany) Opel Skyliners	79–80 (a)	69–62 (h)			
17–5	Top 16	(Turkey) Efes Pilsen	76–73 (a)	77–71 (h)			
17–5	Top 16	(Russia) Ural Great Perm	72–61 (h)	78–87 (a)			
17–5	Top 16	(Spain) Real Madrid	86–58 (a)	71–82 (h)			
17–5	SF	(Italy) Benetton Treviso	90–82; May 3, PalaMalaguti, Bologna				
17–5	F	(Greece) Panathinaikos	83–89; May 5, PalaMalaguti, Bologna				
2002–03 Euroleague 1st–tier
6–14	Regular season	(France) ASVEL	84–88 (h)	88–74 (a)			
6–14	Regular season	(Spain) Real Madrid	81–73 (a)	91–82 (h)			
6–14	Regular season	(Serbia and Montenegro) Partizan Mobtel	86–73 (a)	81–64 (h)			
6–14	Regular season	(Poland) Idea Śląsk Wrocław	86–70 (h)	72–80 (a)			
6–14	Regular season	(Turkey) Ülker	78–105 (a)	68–88 (h)			
6–14	Regular season	(Russia) CSKA Moscow	83–85 (h)	65–80 (a)			
6–14	Regular season	(Greece) Olympiacos	66–80 (a)	73–77 (h)			
6–14	Top 16	(Israel) Maccabi Elite	73–83 (h)	71–98 (a)			
6–14	Top 16	(Italy) Benetton Treviso	70–82 (h)	76–98 (a)			
6–14	Top 16	(Spain) TAU Cerámica	73–93 (a)	85–110 (h)			
2003–04 ULEB Cup 2nd–tier
3–7	Regular season	(Spain) DKV Joventut	78–70 (a)	91–103 (h)			
3–7	Regular season	(Belgium) Go Pass Verviers-Pepinster	66–72 (h)	71–86 (a)			
3–7	Regular season	(Israel) Hapoel Migdal	71–79 (h)	84–101 (a)			
3–7	Regular season	(Serbia and Montenegro) Reflex FMP	53–84 (a)	69–78 (h)			
3–7	Regular season	(Germany) Telekom Baskets Bonn	98–73 (h)	82–70 (a)			
2006–07 FIBA EuroCup 3rd–tier
12–4	Group stage	(Netherlands) Demon Recoh Astronauts	104–51 (a)	90–47 (h)			
12–4	Group stage	(France) Adecco ASVEL	76–70 (h)	91–73 (a)			
12–4	Group stage	(Cyprus) EKA AEL	83–88 (a)	96–75 (h)			
12–4	Top 16	(France) Dijon	95–77 (h)	94–78 (a)			
12–4	Top 16	(Estonia) Kalev/Cramo	98–76 (h)	85–82 (a)			
12–4	Top 16	(Spain) Akasvayu Girona	74–106 (a)	84–89 (h)			
12–4	QF	(Turkey) Türk Telekom	95–87 (a)	59–54 (h)	– (a)		
12–4	SF	(Ukraine) Azovmash	73–74; April 13, Pavelló Municipal Girona-Fontajau, Girona				
12–4	3rd place game	(Spain) MMT Estudiantes	80–62; April 15, Pavelló Municipal Girona-Fontajau, Girona				
2007–08 Euroleague 1st–tier
2–12	Regular season	(Lithuania) Žalgiris	81–75 (h)	82–102 (a)			
2–12	Regular season	(Spain) TAU Cerámica	71–98 (a)	69–85 (h)			
2–12	Regular season	(Greece) Olympiacos	76–104 (a)	80–91 (h)			
2–12	Regular season	(Poland) Prokom Trefl Sopot	75–87 (h)	59–79 (a)			
2–12	Regular season	(Italy) Montepaschi Siena	69–80 (a)	64–77 (h)			
2–12	Regular season	(Slovenia) Union Olimpija	101–91 (h)	60–75 (a)			
2–12	Regular season	(Russia) CSKA Moscow	53–79 (a)	68–92 (h)			
2008–09 FIBA EuroChallenge 3rd–tier
13–3	Regular season	(Belgium) Base Oostende	70–69 (h)	87–76 (a)			
13–3	Regular season	(Estonia) Tartu ÜSK Rock	75–73 (a)	95–85 (h)			
13–3	Regular season	(Russia) CSK VVS Samara	75–69 (h)	70–72 (a)			
13–3	Top 16	(Turkey) Galatasaray Café Crown	104–91 (a)	93–77 (h)			
13–3	Top 16	(Germany) EWE Baskets	81–82 (h)	64–73 (a)			
13–3	Top 16	(Ukraine) Kyiv	68–64 (h)	69–57 (a)			
13–3	QF	(Germany) Telekom Baskets Bonn	86–76 (h)	106–91 (a)	– (h)		
13–3	SF	(Cyprus) Proteas EKA AEL	83–64; April 24, Futureshow Station, Bologna				
13–3	F	(France) Cholet	77–75; April 26, Futureshow Station, Bologna				

== Worldwide competitions ==
Record	Round	Opponent club	
1993 McDonald's Championship
2–1	1st round	(Brazil) All-Star Franca	129–88; October 21, Olympiahalle, Munich
2–1	SF	(France) Limoges	101–85; October 22, Olympiahalle, Munich
2–1	F	(United States) Phoenix Suns	90–112; October 23, Olympiahalle, Munich
1995 McDonald's Championship
2–1	1st round	(Israel) Maccabi Elite	112–103; October 19, London Arena, London
2–1	SF	(Spain) Real Madrid	102–96; October 20, London Arena, London
2–1	F	(United States) Houston Rockets	112–126; October 21, London Arena, London

== Record ==
Virtus Bologna has overall from 1960 to 1961 (first participation) to 2008-09 (last participation): 259 wins against 158 defeats in 417 games in all the European club competitions.

- (1st–tier) FIBA European Champions Cup or FIBA European League or FIBA Euroleague or Euroleague: 169–115 in 284 games.
- (2nd–tier) FIBA European Cup Winner's Cup or FIBA Saporta Cup: 48–25 in 73 games.
- (2nd–tier) ULEB Cup: 3–7 in 10 games.
- (3rd–tier) FIBA Korać Cup: 14–4 in 18 games.
- (3rd–tier) FIBA EuroCup or FIBA EuroChallenge: 25–7 in 32 games.

Also Virtus has a 4 (w) – 2 (d) record in the McDonald's Championship.
