= 1989 McDonald's Open =

- League: McDonald's Open
- Sport: Basketball
- Duration: 20–22 October
- Top scorer: (United States) Bob McAdoo (80 pts)
- Finals champions: (United States) Denver Nuggets
- Runners-up: (Socialist Federal Republic of Yugoslavia) Jugoplastika
- Finals MVP: (United States) Walter Davis

McDonald's Championship seasons
- ← 1988 McDonald's Open 1990 McDonald's Open →

The 1989 McDonald's Open took place at PalaEUR in Rome, Italy.

== Participants ==
Club	Qualified as
(Socialist Federal Republic of Yugoslavia) Jugoplastika	Champions of the 1988–89 FIBA European Champions Cup
(Italy) Philips Milano	Champions of the 1988–89 Serie A
(Spain) FC Barcelona Banca Catalana	Champions of the 1988–89 Liga ACB
(United States) Denver Nuggets	Official guest from the NBA (13th place 1988-89 NBA season)

== Games ==
All games were held at the PalaEUR in Rome, Italy.

Semi-finals
October 20
(Socialist Federal Republic of Yugoslavia) Jugoplastika	102
(Italy) Philips Milano	97
October 20
(United States) Denver Nuggets	137
(Spain) FCB Banca Catalana	103

Final
October 22
(Socialist Federal Republic of Yugoslavia) Jugoplastika	129
(United States) Denver Nuggets	135
Third place
October 22
(Italy) Philips Milano	136
(Spain) FCB Banca Catalana	104

== Final standings ==
Pos.	Club	Rec.
	(United States) Denver Nuggets	2–0
Silver medal	(Socialist Federal Republic of Yugoslavia) Jugoplastika	1–1
Bronze medal	(Italy) Philips Milano	1–1
4th	(Spain) FC Barcelona Banca Catalana	0–2

1989 McDonald's Champions

Denver Nuggets

== Sources ==
- Nuggets to the final
- Denver vs Barcelona
- Results
- 1989 Final
