= 1997 McDonald's Championship =

- League: McDonald's Championship
- Sport: Basketball
- Duration: 16–18 October
- Top scorer: (United States) Michael Jordan
- Finals champions: (United States) Chicago Bulls
- Runners-up: (Greece) Olympiacos
- Finals MVP: (United States) Michael Jordan

McDonald's Championship seasons
- ← 1995 McDonald's Championship 1999 McDonald's Championship →

The 1997 McDonald's Championship took place at Palais Omnisports de Paris-Bercy in Paris, France. The Chicago Bulls won the tournament and Michael Jordan was named the tournament's MVP.

== Summary ==
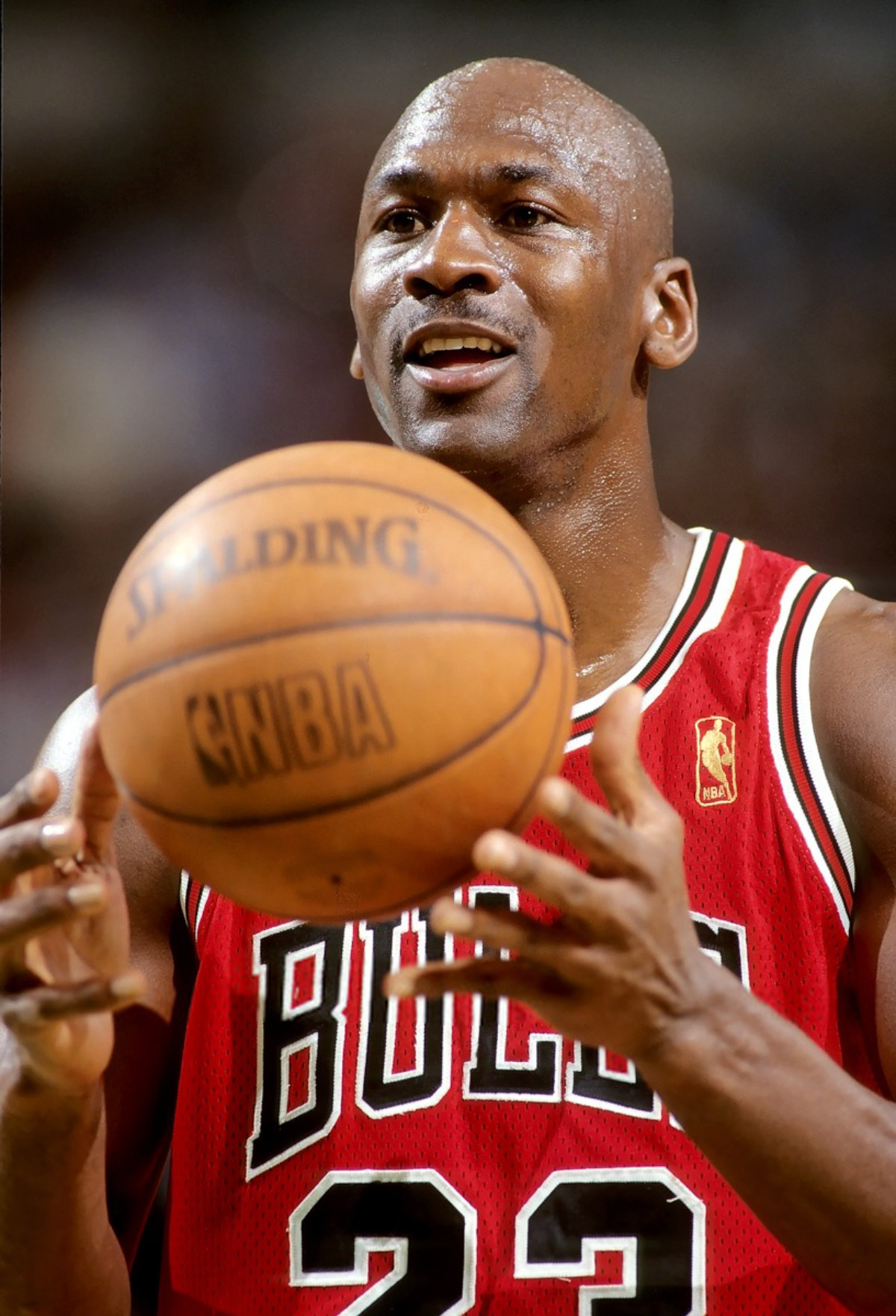
Michael Jordan helped Champions Chicago Bulls win the 1997 McDonald's Championship.

The teams that took part in the 8th edition of the tournament were the Chicago Bulls (USA), Paris Basket Racing (France), Olympiacos Piraeus (Greece), Atenas de Cordoba (Argentina), Benetton Treviso (Italy) and FC Barcelona (Spain).

Surprisingly, both the Italian and Spanish champions, traditional European powerhouses Benetton and FC Barcelona, lost their preliminary stage games and were forced to battle for 5th place. The Chicago Bulls instead led by Michael Jordan, and without Scottie Pippen managed to win their semifinal game against the hosts PSG Racing coached by Božidar Maljković, by 89–82. In the final game Chicago Bulls faced European champions Olympiacos Piraeus. The Greek side coached by legendary Serbian coach Dušan Ivković proved stronger than PSG Racing, but the Bulls cruised to an easy 104–78 win.

The tournament was noted for having more than 1,000 journalists from 54 countries covering it, more than the previous NBA finals. It was mentioned in an early episode of the documentary miniseries, The Last Dance.

== Participants ==
Continent	Teams	Clubs			
Europe	4	(Spain) FC Barcelona Banca Catalana	(France) PSG Racing	(Greece) Olympiacos	(Italy) Benetton Treviso
North America	1	(United States) Chicago Bulls			
South America	1	(Argentina) Atenas			

== Bracket ==
Preliminary round
October 16
(France) PSG Racing	97
(Spain) FCB Banca Catalana	84
October 16
(Argentina) Atenas	87
(Italy) Benetton Treviso	78

Semi-finals
October 17
(United States) Chicago Bulls	89
(France) PSG Racing	82
October 17
(Greece) Olympiacos	89
(Argentina) Atenas	86

Finals
October 18
(United States) Chicago Bulls	104
(Greece) Olympiacos	78
Third place
October 18
(France) PSG Racing	78
(Argentina) Atenas	88

Fifth place
October 18
(Spain) FCB Banca Catalana	103
(Italy) Benetton Treviso	106

=== Final ===
October 18
(CET)

Chicago Bulls (United States)	104–78	(Greece) Olympiacos
Scoring by quarter: 30-20, 24-23, 21-17, 29-18
Pts: Michael Jordan 27		Pts: Artūras Karnišovas 19

Palais Omnisports de Paris-Bercy, Paris

- Chicago Bulls
  - Michael Jordan 27, Randy Brown 12, Steve Kerr 10, Luc Longley 9, Bill Wennington 8, Toni Kukoč 5, Boris Gorenc 7, Jason Caffey 6, Ron Harper 6, Jud Buechler 6, Scott Burrell 4, Joe Kleine 2, Keith Booth 2, Dante Calabria, Rusty LaRue. Coach: Phil Jackson
- Olympiacos
  - Artūras Karnišovas 19, Franko Nakić 16, Dragan Tarlać 14, Michael Hawkins 12, Dimitris Karaplis 6, Johnny Rogers 4, Milan Tomić 3, Aleksey Savrasenko 2, Nikos Michalos 2, Dušan Vukčević, Efthimis Bakatsias, Anatoly Zourpenko, Nikos Pettas. Coach: Dušan Ivković

== Final standings ==
	Club	Record
	(United States) Chicago Bulls	2–0
Silver medal	(Greece) Olympiacos	1-1
Bronze medal	(Argentina) Atenas	2–1
4.	(France) PSG Racing	1–2
5.	(Italy) Benetton Treviso	1-1
6.	(Spain) FC Barcelona Banca Catalana	0–2

1997 McDonald's Champions

Chicago Bulls

== Sources ==
- 1997 edition
