= 1987 McDonald's Open =

- League: McDonald's Open
- Sport: Basketball
- Duration: 23–25 October
- Top scorer: (United States) Bob McAdoo (78 pts)
- Finals champions: (United States) Milwaukee Bucks
- Runners-up: Soviet Union
- Finals MVP: (United States) Terry Cummings

McDonald's Championship seasons
- 1988 McDonald's Open →

The 1987 McDonald's Open took place at MECCA Arena in Milwaukee, United States. This was the first edition of the McDonald's Championship and was a round-robin competition among three teams: the Milwaukee Bucks, Tracer Milano and the Soviet Union national basketball team. The decider was played between Milwaukee Bucks and the Soviet Union on 25 October 1987.

== Participants ==
Club	Qualified as
(United States) Milwaukee Bucks	Host club (9th place in the 1986–87 NBA season)
(Italy) Tracer Milano	Champions of the 1986–87 FIBA European Champions Cup
Soviet Union	Finalists of the EuroBasket 1987

== Games ==
October 23, 1987

Team 1	Score	Team 2
Milwaukee Bucks (United States)	123–111	(Italy) Tracer Milano

October 24, 1987

Team 1	Score	Team 2
Soviet Union	135–108	(Italy) Tracer Milano

October 25, 1987

Team 1	Score	Team 2
Milwaukee Bucks (United States)	127–100	Soviet Union

== Rosters ==
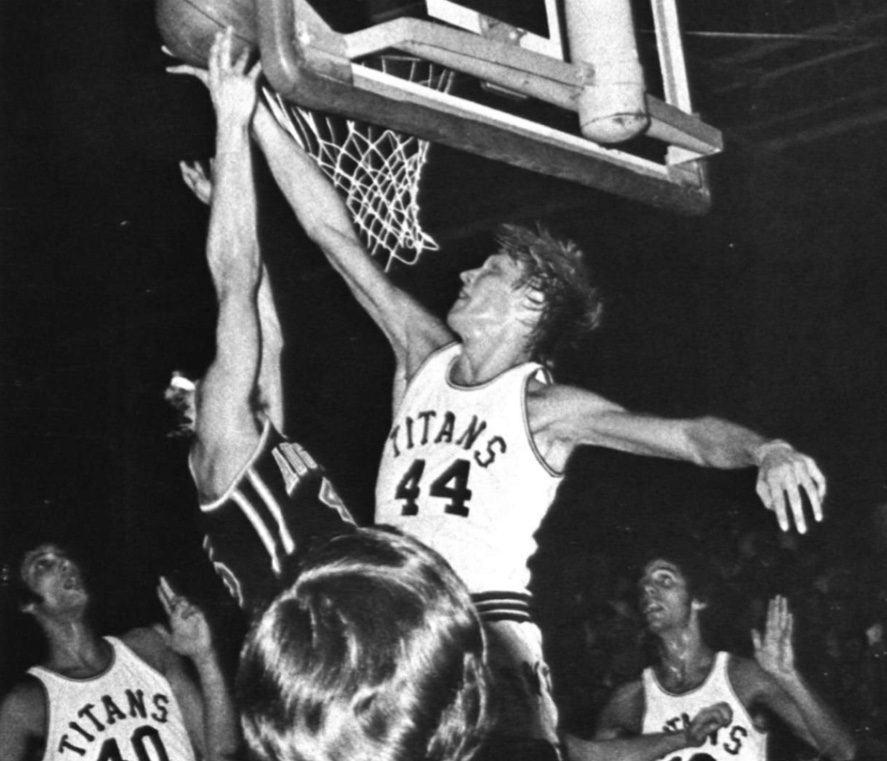
Jack Sikma starred in the first McDonald's Open in 1987 for Milwaukee Bucks.

Milwaukee Bucks: Jack Sikma, Randy Breuer, Paul Pressey, Terry Cummings, Jerry Reynolds - Charles Davis, Pace Mannion, JJ Weber, Paul Mokeski, Keith Smith, John Stroeder, Bob McCann, Dudley Bradley, Winston Garland. Coach: Del Harris
Soviet national team: Tiit Sokk, Viktor Pankrashkin, Valery Tikhonenko, Aleksandr Volkov, Sarunas Marciulionis - Alexander Belostenny, Sergei Tarakanov, Valdemaras Chomičius, Rimas Kurtinaitis, Valdis Valters, Sergei Grishaev, Valery Goborov. Coach: Aleksandr Gomelsky
Tracer Milano: Bob McAdoo, Riccardo Pittis, Fausto Bargna, Rickey Brown, Mike D'Antoni, Dino Meneghin, Roberto Premier, Massimiliano Aldi, Pieto Montecchia, Mario Governa. Coach: Franco Casalini

== Final standings ==
Pos.	Team	Pld.	W	L	PF	PA	PD
1.	(United States) Milwaukee Bucks	2	2	0	250	211	+39
2.	Soviet Union	2	1	1	235	235	0
3.	(Italy) Tracer Milano	2	0	2	219	258	-39

1987 McDonald's Champions

Milwaukee Bucks

== Sources ==
- Bucks vs Soviet Union
- Bucks vs Tracer
- Soviets vs Tracer
- Historical
- História 1987
