= 1988 McDonald's Open =

- League: McDonald's Open
- Sport: Basketball
- Duration: 21–24 October
- Top scorer: (United States) Larry Bird (Croatia) Dražen Petrović (56 pts)
- Finals champions: (United States) Boston Celtics
- Runners-up: (Spain) Real Madrid
- Finals MVP: (United States) Larry Bird

McDonald's Championship seasons
- ← 1987 McDonald's Open 1989 McDonald's Open →

The 1988 McDonald's Open took place at Palacio de los Deportes in Madrid, Spain.

== Participants ==
Club	Qualified as
(Spain) Real Madrid	Host club
(Italy) Scavolini Pesaro	Champions of the 1987–88 Serie A
(Socialist Federal Republic of Yugoslavia) Yugoslavia	Olympic silver of the 1988 Summer Olympics Basketball Tournament
(United States) Boston Celtics	Official guest from the NBA (3rd place 1987-88 NBA season)

== Games ==
All games were held at the Palacio de los Deportes in Madrid, Spain.

Semi-finals
October 21
(Spain) Real Madrid	108
(Italy) Scavolini Pesaro	96
October 21
(United States) Boston Celtics	113
(Socialist Federal Republic of Yugoslavia) Yugoslavia	85

Final
October 24
(Spain) Real Madrid	96
(United States) Boston Celtics	111
Third place
October 23
(Italy) Scavolini Pesaro	91
(Socialist Federal Republic of Yugoslavia) Yugoslavia	100

== Final standings ==
Pos.	Club	Rec.
	(United States) Boston Celtics	2–0
Silver medal	(Spain) Real Madrid	1–1
Bronze medal	(Socialist Federal Republic of Yugoslavia) Yugoslavia	1–1
4th	(Italy) Scavolini Pesaro	0–2

1988 McDonald's Champions

Boston Celtics

== Sources ==
- Celtics 1988
- Bird scored 27 points
