= 1990 McDonald's Open =

- League: McDonald's Open
- Sport: Basketball
- Duration: 11–13 October
- Top scorer: (United States) Patrick Ewing (57 pts)
- Finals champions: (United States) New York Knicks
- Runners-up: (Socialist Federal Republic of Yugoslavia) POP 84
- Finals MVP: (United States) Patrick Ewing

McDonald's Championship seasons
- ← 1989 McDonald's Open 1991 McDonald's Open →

The 1990 McDonald's Open took place at Palau Sant Jordi, in Barcelona, Spain. The New York Knicks won the tournament after defeating Scavolini Pesaro in overtime and then POP 84 in the championship game. Patrick Ewing was named the tournament's MVP.

== Participants ==
Club	Qualified as
(Spain) FC Barcelona Banca Catalana	Host club
(Socialist Federal Republic of Yugoslavia) POP 84	Champions of the 1989–90 FIBA European Champions Cup
(Italy) Scavolini Pesaro	Champions of the 1989–90 Serie A
(United States) New York Knicks	Official guest from the NBA (7th place 1989-90 NBA season)

== Games ==
All games were held at the Palau Sant Jordi in Barcelona, Spain.

Semi-finals
October 11
(Socialist Federal Republic of Yugoslavia) POP 84	102
(Spain) FCB Banca Catalana	97
October 11
(United States) New York Knicks	119
(Italy) Scavolini Pesaro	115

Final
October 13
(Socialist Federal Republic of Yugoslavia) POP 84	101
(United States) New York Knicks	117
Third place
October 13
(Spain) FCB Banca Catalana	106
(Italy) Scavolini Pesaro	105

== Final standings ==
Pos.	Club	Rec.
	(United States) New York Knicks	2–0
Silver medal	(Socialist Federal Republic of Yugoslavia) POP 84	1–1
Bronze medal	(Spain) FC Barcelona Banca Catalana	1–1
4th	(Italy) Scavolini Pesaro	0–2

1990 McDonald's Champions

New York Knicks
