= 1991 McDonald's Open =

- League: McDonald's Open
- Sport: Basketball
- Duration: 18–19 October
- Top scorer: (Spain) Jordi Villacampa
- Finals champions: (United States) Los Angeles Lakers
- Runners-up: (Spain) Montigalà Joventut
- Finals MVP: (United States) Magic Johnson

McDonald's Championship seasons
- ← 1990 McDonald's Open 1993 McDonald's Open →

The 1991 McDonald's Open took place at Palais Omnisports de Paris-Bercy in Paris, France. The Los Angeles Lakers won the tournament after beating Montigalà Joventut 116-114 in the championship game, with the Lakers' Magic Johnson being named the tournament's MVP.

== Participants ==
Club	Qualified as
(Croatia) Slobodna Dalmacija	Champions of the 1990–91 FIBA European Champions Cup
(Spain) Montigalà Joventut	Champions of the 1990–91 Liga ACB
(France) Limoges CSP	Runners-up of the 1990–91 Nationale 1A
(United States) Los Angeles Lakers	Runners-up of the 1990–91 NBA Finals

== Games ==
All games were held at the Palais Omnisports de Paris-Bercy in Paris, France.

Semi-finals
October 18
(Spain) Montigalà Joventut	117
(Croatia) Slobodna Dalmacija	86
October 18
(United States) Los Angeles Lakers	132
(France) Limoges CSP	101

Final
October 19
(Spain) Montigalà Joventut	114
(United States) Los Angeles Lakers	116
Third place
October 19
(Croatia) Slobodna Dalmacija	91
(France) Limoges CSP	105

== Final standings ==
Pos.	Club	Rec.
	(United States) Los Angeles Lakers	2–0
Silver medal	(Spain) Montigalà Joventut	1–1
Bronze medal	(France) Limoges CSP	1–1
4th	(Croatia) Slobodna Dalmacija	0–2

1991 McDonald's Champions

Los Angeles Lakers
