= McDonald's Championship =

Former international basketball club cup competition

- Sport: Basketball
- Founded: 1987
- Folded: 1999
- No. of teams: 6
- Country: International
- Last champion: (United States) San Antonio Spurs (1st title)
- Most titles: (United States) 9 NBA teams (1 title each)

The McDonald's Championship (sometimes called the McDonald's Open) was an international men's basketball competition that featured a representative of the National Basketball Association (representing North America) against champion club teams from Europe, the National Basketball League (representing Oceania), and South America (although it also featured the Soviet national team in 1987). The competition was launched as McDonald's Open in 1987 with FIBA sanctioning the event and it was renamed as McDonald's Championship in 1995. FIBA EuroLeague champions participated in the competition from its third edition in 1989, while NBA champions would join from 1995 and onwards.

McDonald's Open received a lot of media and fan attention and it was held annually from 1987 until 1991. Although it was a weekend-long late-October preseason event, both FIBA and the NBA officially accepted it as a Championship. It was not held in 1992, 1994 and 1996 due to the participation of the NBA players in the Olympics and the FIBA World Cup, and also in 1998 because of the NBA lock-out. The all-time scorer of the competition is Bob McAdoo with 158 points in two editions with Olimpia Milano, while Toni Kukoc is the tournament's all-time leader in assists.

== History ==
The first competition was held in 1987 and continued annually after that until 1991, when the tournament switched to a biennial event. For the first two years, the men's national teams from Yugoslavia and the Soviet Union participated. In each of the nine years the McDonald's Championship was held, the title was won by a team from the NBA, but twice by a close margin. The first time was in the semifinals in 1990, when the New York Knicks trailed Italian club Scavolini Pesaro by three points (107–104) with only 30 seconds on the clock. After successfully defending, the Knicks won possession and Gerald Wilkins netted a three-pointer with eight seconds remaining to send the game into overtime. The other close game came the following year in 1991, when the Los Angeles Lakers defeated Spanish champions Montigalà Joventut by two points (116–114). Virtus Bologna played in the final in 1993 and 1995 losing both times to NBA teams, and alongside KK Split were the only teams to finish runners-up twice. In 1997, Atenas Cordoba was invited as South American champions for the first time in the history of the McDonald's Open. In 1999, the FIBA Asia basketball club champions, Sagesse Club, participated in the McDonald's Championship, the first and only time Asia was represented in the tournament. The McDonald's Championship was discontinued after 1999 following the 2000 FIBA–EuroLeague dispute which forced FIBA to ultimately lose control of its top-tier European club competition.

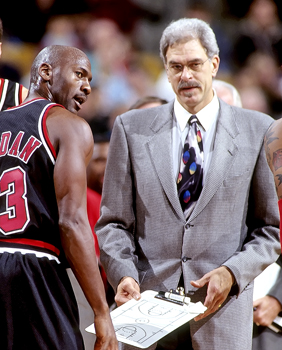
NBA Champions Chicago Bulls won the 1997 McDonald's edition led by head coach Phil Jackson and topscorer Michael Jordan.

Many famous American players like Michael Jordan, Bob McAdoo, Larry Bird, Magic Johnson, Clyde Drexler, Sam Cassell, Hakeem Olajuwon, Kevin Johnson, Robert Parish, Charles Barkley, Tim Duncan, and Patrick Ewing featured in the competition. Non-American players were Sarunas Marciulionis, Toni Kukoc, Arvydas Sabonis, Predrag Danilovic, Drazen Petrovic, Zarko Paspalj, Fabricio Oberto, Héctor Campana, Arturas Karnisovas, Dino Meneghin, Jordi Villacampa, Alexander Volkov and Riccardo Pittis.

=== Media coverage ===
In the United States, ABC held the network television rights from 1987 to 1989. Gary Bender and Dick Vitale provided the commentary for ABC's broadcasts. Supplemental coverage was provided by TBS. Beginning in 1990, American network TV coverage moved over to NBC. NBC would continue to broadcast the finals of the McDonald's Championship through 1997. TNT exclusively covered the final McDonald's Championship event in 1999. Marv Albert, Doug Collins, and Hubie Brown were the commentators for TNT in 1999.

=== Legacy ===
FIBA Secretary General Borislav Stankovic and David Stern (NBA Commissioner from 1984 to 2014), believed that basketball everywhere would benefit if the best players from all countries competed against each other. In 1989, two years after the first McDonald's Open, FIBA voted to allow NBA players to participate in all its tournaments.

== Format ==
After the first tournament (three teams championship format), the competition was played in a single elimination format, with the winners of each match advancing to the next round.

=== Rules ===
The competition combined rules of both the NBA and the European leagues (FIBA rules).

== Results ==
Year	Final			Third place game	
Year	Champions	Score	Runners-up	Third	Fourth
1987; Details	(United States); Milwaukee Bucks	127-100	Soviet Union	(Italy); Tracer Milano	—N/a
1988; Details	(United States); Boston Celtics	111–96	(Spain); Real Madrid	(Socialist Federal Republic of Yugoslavia); Yugoslavia	(Italy); Scavolini Pesaro
1989; Details	(United States); Denver Nuggets	135–129	(Socialist Federal Republic of Yugoslavia); Jugoplastika	(Italy); Philips Milano	(Spain); FC Barcelona Banca Catalana
1990; Details	(United States); New York Knicks	117–101	(Socialist Federal Republic of Yugoslavia); POP 84	(Spain); FC Barcelona Banca Catalana	(Italy); Scavolini Pesaro
1991; Details	(United States); Los Angeles Lakers	116–114	(Spain); Montigalà Joventut	(France); Limoges CSP	(Croatia); Slobodna Dalmacija
1993; Details	(United States); Phoenix Suns	112–90	(Italy); Buckler Beer Bologna	(Spain); Real Madrid Teka	(France); Limoges CSP
1995; Details	(United States); Houston Rockets	126–112	(Italy); Buckler Beer Bologna	(Australia); Perth Wildcats	(Spain); Real Madrid Teka
1997; Details	(United States); Chicago Bulls	104–78	(Greece); Olympiacos	(Argentina); Atenas	(France); PSG Racing
1999; Details	(United States); San Antonio Spurs	103–68	(Brazil); Vasco da Gama	(Lithuania); Žalgiris	(Italy); Varese Roosters

== MVPs ==
The NBA's teams dominated the competition and won all 9 tournaments with their stars picking up all the MVP awards. The award was named after Drazen Petrovic who lost his life in 1993.

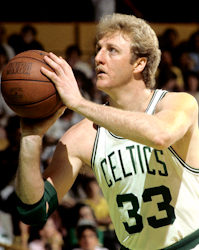
Larry Bird was the McDonald's Championship MVP in 1988 with Boston Celtics.

Year	Player	Team
1987	(United States) Terry Cummings	(United States) Milwaukee Bucks
1988	(United States) Larry Bird	(United States) Boston Celtics
1989	(United States) Walter Davis	(United States) Denver Nuggets
1990	(United States) Patrick Ewing	(United States) New York Knicks
1991	(United States) Magic Johnson	(United States) Los Angeles Lakers
1993	(United States) Charles Barkley	(United States) Phoenix Suns
1995	(United States) Clyde Drexler	(United States) Houston Rockets
1997	(United States) Michael Jordan	(United States) Chicago Bulls
1999	(United States) Tim Duncan	(United States) San Antonio Spurs

== Top-scorers ==
Only three NBA players won this honor: Michael Jordan, Patrick Ewing and Larry Bird.

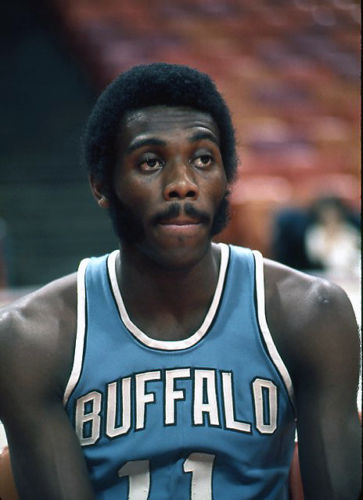
Bob McAdoo was the McDonald's Championship Top Scorer in 1987 and 1989 with Olimpia Milano. He is also the all-time scorer in the history of the competition

Year	Player	Team
1987	(United States) Bob McAdoo	(Italy) Tracer Milano
1988	(United States) Larry Bird (Socialist Federal Republic of Yugoslavia) Dražen Petrović	(United States) Boston Celtics (Spain) Real Madrid
1989	(United States) Bob McAdoo (2)	(Italy) Philips Milano
1990	(United States) Patrick Ewing	(United States) New York Knicks
1991	(Spain) Jordi Villacampa	(Spain) Montigalà Joventut
1993	(United States) Joe Arlauckas	(Spain) Real Madrid Teka
1995	(United States) Orlando Woolridge	(Italy) Buckler Beer Bologna
1997	(United States) Michael Jordan	(United States) Chicago Bulls
1999	(United States) Charles Byrd	(Brazil) Vasco da Gama

== Finishes ==
=== Top 4 finishes by team ===
Team	Champions	Runners-up	Third place	Fourth place
(United States) Boston Celtics	1	0	0	0
(United States) Chicago Bulls	1	0	0	0
(United States) Denver Nuggets	1	0	0	0
(United States) Houston Rockets	1	0	0	0
(United States) Los Angeles Lakers	1	0	0	0
(United States) Milwaukee Bucks	1	0	0	0
(United States) New York Knicks	1	0	0	0
(United States) Phoenix Suns	1	0	0	0
(United States) San Antonio Spurs	1	0	0	0
(Socialist Federal Republic of Yugoslavia) (Croatia) Split (Note: Playing under the name of Jugoplastika, POP 84 and Slobodna Dalmacija due to sponsorship reasons.)	0	2	0	1
(Italy) Virtus Bologna (Note: Playing under the name of Buckler Beer Bologna due to sponsorship reasons.)	0	2	0	0
(Spain) Real Madrid	0	1	1	1
(Spain) Joventut Badalona	0	1	0	0
(Greece) Olympiacos	0	1	0	0
Soviet Union	0	1	0	0
(Brazil) Vasco da Gama	0	1	0	0
(Italy) Olimpia Milano (Note: Playing under the name of Tracer Milano and Philips Milano due to sponsorship reasons.)	0	0	2	0
(Spain) FC Barcelona	0	0	1	1
(France) Limoges CSP	0	0	1	1
(Argentina) Atenas	0	0	1	0
(Australia) Perth Wildcats	0	0	1	0
(Socialist Federal Republic of Yugoslavia) Yugoslavia	0	0	1	0
(Lithuania) Žalgiris	0	0	1	0
(Italy) Victoria Libertas (Note: Playing under the name of Scavolini Pesaro due to sponsorship reasons.)	0	0	0	2
(France) Racing Paris	0	0	0	1
(Italy) Varese (Note: Playing under the name of Varese Roosters due to sponsorship reasons.)	0	0	0	1

=== Top 4 finishes by country ===
Country	Champions	Runners-up	Third place	Fourth place
United States	9	0	0	0
Italy	0	2	2	3
Spain	0	2	2	2
(Socialist Federal Republic of Yugoslavia) Yugoslavia	0	2	1	0
Brazil	0	1	0	0
Greece	0	1	0	0
Soviet Union	0	1	0	0
France	0	0	1	2
Argentina	0	0	1	0
Australia	0	0	1	0
Lithuania	0	0	1	0
Croatia	0	0	0	1

== See also ==
- EuroLeague American Tour
- List of games played between NBA and international teams
- Naismith Cup
- NBA Canada Series
- NBA Global Games
- NBA versus EuroLeague games
- FIBA Intercontinental Cup

== Sources ==
- FIBA and McDonald's
- 1987-99
