= 1995 McDonald's Championship =

- League: McDonald's Championship
- Sport: Basketball
- Duration: 19–21 October
- Top scorer: (United States) Orlando Woolridge (91 pts)
- Finals champions: (United States) Houston Rockets
- Runners-up: (Italy) Buckler Beer Bologna
- Finals MVP: (United States) Clyde Drexler

McDonald's Championship seasons
- ← 1993 McDonald's Open 1997 McDonald's Championship →

The 1995 McDonald's Championship took place at the London Arena in London, United Kingdom.

== Participants ==
Continent	Teams	Clubs			
Europe	4	(England) Sheffield Sharks	(Spain) Real Madrid Teka	(Israel) Maccabi Elite Tel Aviv	(Italy) Buckler Beer Bologna
North America	1	(United States) Houston Rockets			
Oceania	1	(Australia) Perth Wildcats			

== Bracket ==
Preliminary round
October 19
(Spain) Real Madrid Teka	99
(England) Sheffield Sharks	71
October 19
(Italy) Buckler Beer Bologna	112
(Israel) Maccabi Elite Tel Aviv	103

Semi-finals
October 20
(United States) Houston Rockets	116
(Australia) Perth Wildcats	72
October 20
(Spain) Real Madrid Teka	96
(Italy) Buckler Beer Bologna	102

Finals
October 21
(United States) Houston Rockets	126
(Italy) Buckler Beer Bologna	112
Third place
October 21
(Australia) Perth Wildcats	93
(Spain) Real Madrid Teka	86

Fifth place
October 21
(England) Sheffield Sharks	89
(Israel) Maccabi Elite Tel Aviv	107

== Final standings ==
	Club	Record
	(United States) Houston Rockets	2–0
Silver medal	(Italy) Buckler Beer Bologna	2–1
Bronze medal	(Australia) Perth Wildcats	1-1
4.	(Spain) Real Madrid Teka	1–2
5.	(Israel) Maccabi Elite Tel Aviv	1-1
6.	(England) Sheffield Sharks	0–2

1995 McDonald's Champions

Houston Rockets
