= 1993 McDonald's Open =

- League: McDonald's Open
- Sport: Basketball
- Duration: 21–23 October
- Top scorer: (United States) Joe Arlauckas (69 pts)
- Finals champions: (United States) Phoenix Suns
- Runners-up: (Italy) Buckler Beer Bologna
- Finals MVP: (United States) Charles Barkley

McDonald's Championship seasons
- ← 1991 McDonald's Open 1995 McDonald's Championship →

The 1993 McDonald's Open took place at the Olympiahalle in Munich, Germany.

== Participants ==
| Club | Qualified as |
|---|---|
| (Brazil) All-Star Franca | Champions of the 1993 Campeonato Nacional de Basquete |
| (France) Limoges CSP | Champions of the 1992–93 FIBA European League |
| (Germany) Bayer 04 Leverkusen | Champions of the 1992–93 Basketball Bundesliga |
| (Italy) Buckler Beer Bologna | Champions of the 1992–93 Serie A |
| (Spain) Real Madrid Teka | Champions of the 1992–93 Liga ACB |
| (United States) Phoenix Suns | Runners-up of the 1992–93 NBA Finals |

== Games ==
Preliminary round
October 21
(Spain) Real Madrid Teka | 85
(Germany) Bayer 04 Leverkusen | 75
October 21
(Italy) Buckler Beer Bologna | 129
(Brazil) All-Star Franca | 88

Semi-finals
October 22
(United States) Phoenix Suns | 145
(Spain) Real Madrid Teka | 115
October 22
(France) Limoges CSP | 85
(Italy) Buckler Beer Bologna | 101

Finals
October 23
(United States) Phoenix Suns | 112
(Italy) Buckler Beer Bologna | 90
Third place
October 23
(Spain) Real Madrid Teka | 123
(France) Limoges CSP | 119

| Fifth place |
| October 22 |
| (Germany) Bayer 04 Leverkusen | 97 |
| (Brazil) All-Star Franca | 104 |

== Final standings ==
| Pos. | Club | Rec. |
|---|---|---|
| | (United States) Phoenix Suns | 2–0 |
| Silver medal | (Italy) Buckler Beer Bologna | 2–1 |
| Bronze medal | (Spain) Real Madrid Teka | 2–1 |
| 4. | (France) Limoges CSP | 0–2 |
| 5. | (Brazil) All-Star Franca | 1–1 |
| 6. | (Germany) Bayer 04 Leverkusen | 0–2 |

1993 McDonald's Champions

Phoenix Suns

== Sources ==
- Barkley MVP
