= KK Split in international competitions =

KK Split history and statistics in FIBA Europe and Euroleague Basketball (company) competitions.

| FIBA European Champions Cup | FIBA European Cup Winners' Cup | FIBA Korać Cup | FIBA Korać Cup | FIBA European Champions Cup |
|---|---|---|---|---|
| (Israel); Tel Aviv; Sports Palace at Yad Eliyahu Runners-up 1972 | (Greece); Thessaloniki; Alexandreio Melathron Runners-up 1973 | (Italy); Turin; Palasport Parco Ruffini 1976 | (Italy); Genoa; Palasport della Fiera 1977 | (West Germany); Munich; Olympiahalle 1989 |

| McDonald's Open | FIBA European Champions Cup | McDonald's Open | FIBA European Champions Cup | |
|---|---|---|---|---|
| (Italy); Rome; PalaEUR Runners-up 1989 | (Spain); Zaragoza; Pabellón Príncipe Felipe 1990 | (Spain); Barcelona; Palau Sant Jordi Runners-up 1990 | (France); Paris; Palais Omnisports de Paris-Bercy 1991 | N/A |

== 1970s ==
=== 1971–72 FIBA European Champions Cup, 1st–tier ===
The 1971–72 FIBA European Champions Cup was the 15th installment of the European top-tier level professional basketball club competition FIBA European Champions Cup (now called EuroLeague), running from November 4, 1971, to March 23, 1972. The trophy was won by Ignis Varese, who defeated Jugoplastika by a result of 70–69 at Yad Eliyahu Arena in Tel Aviv, Israel. Overall, Jugoplastika achieved in the present competition a record of 8 wins against 5 defeats, in five successive rounds. More detailed:

==== First round ====
- Tie played on November 4, 1971, and on November 11, 1971.

| Team 1 | Agg. | Team 2 | 1st leg | 2nd leg |
|---|---|---|---|---|
| Al-Gezira (United Arab Republic) | 141–196 | (Socialist Federal Republic of Yugoslavia) Jugoplastika | 66–84 | 75–112 |

==== Second round ====
- Tie played on December 2, 1971, and on December 9, 1971.

| Team 1 | Agg. | Team 2 | 1st leg | 2nd leg |
|---|---|---|---|---|
| 17 Nëntori (Albania) | 135–175 | (Socialist Federal Republic of Yugoslavia) Jugoplastika | 77–90 | 58–85 |

==== Quarterfinals ====
- Tie played on January 5, 1972, and on January 12, 1972.

| Team 1 | Agg. | Team 2 | 1st leg | 2nd leg |
|---|---|---|---|---|
| Slavia VŠ Praha (Czechoslovakia) | 159–169 | (Socialist Federal Republic of Yugoslavia) Jugoplastika | 78–75 | 81–94 |

- Tie played on January 19, 1972, and on February 3, 1972.

| Team 1 | Agg. | Team 2 | 1st leg | 2nd leg |
|---|---|---|---|---|
| Jugoplastika (Socialist Federal Republic of Yugoslavia) | 170–157 | (Greece) Panathinaikos | 87–63 | 83–94 |

- Tie played on February 9, 1972, and on February 17, 1972.

| Team 1 | Agg. | Team 2 | 1st leg | 2nd leg |
|---|---|---|---|---|
| Jugoplastika (Socialist Federal Republic of Yugoslavia) | 171–158 | (Belgium) Bus Fruit Lier | 92–67 | 79–91 |

- Group B standings:

| Pos. | Team | Pld. | Pts. | W | L | PF | PA | PD | Tie-break |
|---|---|---|---|---|---|---|---|---|---|
| 1. | (Socialist Federal Republic of Yugoslavia) Jugoplastika | 3 | 6 | 3 | 0 | 510 | 474 | +36 | |
| 2. | (Greece) Panathinaikos | 3 | 4 | 1 | 2 | 484 | 489 | -5 | 2–1–1 |
| 3. | (Czechoslovakia) Slavia VŠ Praha | 3 | 4 | 1 | 2 | 484 | 506 | -22 | 1–2–1 |
| 4. | (Belgium) Bus Fruit Lier | 3 | 4 | 1 | 2 | 494 | 503 | -9 | 1–1–2 |

==== Semifinals ====
- Tie played on March 2, 1972, and on March 9, 1972.

| Team 1 | Agg. | Team 2 | 1st leg | 2nd leg |
|---|---|---|---|---|
| Real Madrid (Spain) | 158–161 | (Socialist Federal Republic of Yugoslavia) Jugoplastika | 89–81 | 69–80 |

==== Final ====
- March 23, 1972 at Sports Palace at Yad Eliyahu in Tel Aviv, Israel.

| Team 1 | Score | Team 2 |
|---|---|---|
| Ignis Varese (Italy) | 70–69 | (Socialist Federal Republic of Yugoslavia) Jugoplastika |

=== 1972–73 FIBA European Cup Winners' Cup, 2nd–tier ===
The 1972–73 FIBA European Cup Winners' Cup was the 7th installment of FIBA's 2nd-tier level European-wide professional club basketball competition FIBA European Cup Winners' Cup (lately called FIBA Saporta Cup), running from October 18, 1972, to March 20, 1973. The trophy was won by Spartak Leningrad, who defeated Jugoplastika by a result of 77–62 at Alexandreio Melathron in Thessaloniki, Greece. Overall, Jugoplastika achieved in the present competition a record of 7 wins against 4 defeats, in two successive rounds. More detailed:

==== First round ====
- Bye

==== Second round ====
- Tie played on November 8, 1972, and on November 15, 1972.

| Team 1 | Agg. | Team 2 | 1st leg | 2nd leg |
|---|---|---|---|---|
| Levski-Spartak (Bulgaria) | 141–144 | (Socialist Federal Republic of Yugoslavia) Jugoplastika | 70–65 | 71–79 |

==== Top 12 ====
- Tie played on December 6, 1972, and on December 13, 1972.

| Team 1 | Agg. | Team 2 | 1st leg | 2nd leg |
|---|---|---|---|---|
| Gießen 46ers (West Germany) | 166–191 | (Socialist Federal Republic of Yugoslavia) Jugoplastika | 84–99 | 82–92 |

==== Quarterfinals ====
- Tie played on January 10, 1973, and on January 17, 1973.

| Team 1 | Agg. | Team 2 | 1st leg | 2nd leg |
|---|---|---|---|---|
| Jugoplastika (Socialist Federal Republic of Yugoslavia) | 152–147 | (Spain) Juventud Schweppes | 90–71 | 62–76 |

- Tie played on January 24, 1973, and on January 31, 1973.

| Team 1 | Agg. | Team 2 | 1st leg | 2nd leg |
|---|---|---|---|---|
| Steaua București (Romania) | 148–162 | (Socialist Federal Republic of Yugoslavia) Jugoplastika | 87–80 | 61–82 |

- Group B standings:

| Pos. | Team | Pld. | Pts. | W | L | PF | PA | PD |
|---|---|---|---|---|---|---|---|---|
| 1. | (Socialist Federal Republic of Yugoslavia) Jugoplastika | 2 | 4 | 2 | 0 | 314 | 295 | +19 |
| 2. | (Spain) Juventud Schweppes | 2 | 3 | 1 | 1 | 296 | 298 | -2 |
| 3. | (Romania) Steaua București | 2 | 2 | 0 | 2 | 294 | 311 | -17 |

==== Semifinals ====
- Tie played on February 28, 1973, and on March 7, 1973.

| Team 1 | Agg. | Team 2 | 1st leg | 2nd leg |
|---|---|---|---|---|
| Jugoplastika (Socialist Federal Republic of Yugoslavia) | 178–161 | (Italy) Mobilquattro Milano | 96–81 | 82–70 |

==== Final ====
- March 20, 1973 at Alexandreio Melathron in Thessaloniki, Greece.

| Team 1 | Score | Team 2 |
|---|---|---|
| Spartak Leningrad (Soviet Union) | 77–62 | (Socialist Federal Republic of Yugoslavia) Jugoplastika |

=== 1973–74 FIBA Korać Cup, 3rd–tier ===
The 1973–74 FIBA Korać Cup was the 3rd installment of the European 3rd-tier level professional basketball club competition FIBA Korać Cup, running from November 6, 1973, to April 11, 1974. The trophy was won by the title holder Birra Forst Cantù, who defeated Partizan by a result of 174–154 in a two-legged final on a home and away basis. Overall, Jugoplastika achieved in present competition a record of 5 wins against 5 defeats, in four successive rounds. More detailed:

==== First round ====
- Tie played on November 6, 1973, and on November 13, 1973.

| Team 1 | Agg. | Team 2 | 1st leg | 2nd leg |
|---|---|---|---|---|
| Denain Voltaire (France) | 164–175 | (Socialist Federal Republic of Yugoslavia) Jugoplastika | 83–81 | 81–94 |

==== Second round ====
- Tie played on November 27, 1973, and on December 4, 1973.

| Team 1 | Agg. | Team 2 | 1st leg | 2nd leg |
|---|---|---|---|---|
| Balkan Botevgrad (Bulgaria) | 164–166 | (Socialist Federal Republic of Yugoslavia) Jugoplastika | 91–62 | 73–104 |

==== Top 12 ====
- Tie played on January 8, 1974, and on January 15, 1974.

| Team 1 | Agg. | Team 2 | 1st leg | 2nd leg |
|---|---|---|---|---|
| AEK (Greece) | 185–200 | (Socialist Federal Republic of Yugoslavia) Jugoplastika | 112–103 | 73–97 |

- Tie played on February 19, 1974, and on February 26, 1974.

| Team 1 | Agg. | Team 2 | 1st leg | 2nd leg |
|---|---|---|---|---|
| Jugoplastika (Socialist Federal Republic of Yugoslavia) | 174–169 | (Italy) Snaidero Udine | 101–86 | 73–83 |

- Group B standings:

| Pos. | Team | Pld. | Pts. | W | L | PF | PA | PD |
|---|---|---|---|---|---|---|---|---|
| 1. | (Socialist Federal Republic of Yugoslavia) Jugoplastika | 2 | 4 | 2 | 0 | 374 | 354 | +20 |
| 2. | (Italy) Snaidero Udine | 2 | 3 | 1 | 1 | 326 | 301 | +25 |
| 3. | (Greece) AEK | 2 | 2 | 0 | 2 | 312 | 357 | -45 |

==== Semifinals ====
- Tie played on March 12, 1974, and on March 19, 1974.

| Team 1 | Agg. | Team 2 | 1st leg | 2nd leg |
|---|---|---|---|---|
| Partizan (Socialist Federal Republic of Yugoslavia) | 183–182 | (Socialist Federal Republic of Yugoslavia) Jugoplastika | 108–97 | 75-85 |

=== 1974–75 FIBA European Cup Winners' Cup, 2nd–tier ===
The 1974–75 FIBA European Cup Winners' Cup was the 9th installment of FIBA's 2nd-tier level European-wide professional club basketball competition FIBA European Cup Winners' Cup (lately called FIBA Saporta Cup), running from November 6, 1974, to March 26, 1975. The trophy was won by Spartak Leningrad, who defeated Crvena zvezda by a result of 63–62 at Palais des Sports de Beaulieu in Nantes, France. Overall, Jugoplastika achieved in the present competition a record of 6 wins against 4 defeats, in four successive rounds. More detailed:

==== First round ====
- Bye

==== Second round ====
- Tie played on November 27, 1974, and on December 4, 1974.

| Team 1 | Agg. | Team 2 | 1st leg | 2nd leg |
|---|---|---|---|---|
| Dukla Olomouc (Czechoslovakia) | 152–183 | (Socialist Federal Republic of Yugoslavia) Jugoplastika | 82–84 | 70–99 |

==== Quarterfinals ====
- Tie played on January 8, 1975, and on January 15, 1975.

| Team 1 | Agg. | Team 2 | 1st leg | 2nd leg |
|---|---|---|---|---|
| Jugoplastika (Socialist Federal Republic of Yugoslavia) | 158–152 | (France) Moderne | 94–78 | 64–74 |

- Tie played on January 22, 1975, and on January 29, 1975.

| Team 1 | Agg. | Team 2 | 1st leg | 2nd leg |
|---|---|---|---|---|
| Spartak Leningrad (Soviet Union) | 167–149 | (Socialist Federal Republic of Yugoslavia) Jugoplastika | 98–78 | 69–71 |

- Tie played on February 5, 1975, and on February 12, 1975.

| Team 1 | Agg. | Team 2 | 1st leg | 2nd leg |
|---|---|---|---|---|
| Sinudyne Bologna (Italy) | 155–165 | (Socialist Federal Republic of Yugoslavia) Jugoplastika | 81–78 | 74–87 |

- Group B standings:

| Pos. | Team | Pld. | Pts. | W | L | PF | PA | PD |
|---|---|---|---|---|---|---|---|---|
| 1. | (Soviet Union) Spartak Leningrad | 3 | 6 | 3 | 0 | 497 | 427 | +70 |
| 2. | (Socialist Federal Republic of Yugoslavia) Jugoplastika | 3 | 5 | 2 | 1 | 472 | 474 | -2 |
| 3. | (Italy) Sinudyne Bologna | 3 | 4 | 1 | 2 | 467 | 469 | -2 |
| 4. | (France) Moderne | 3 | 3 | 0 | 3 | 444 | 510 | -66 |

==== Semifinals ====
- Tie played on February 26, 1975, and on March 5, 1975.

| Team 1 | Agg. | Team 2 | 1st leg | 2nd leg |
|---|---|---|---|---|
| Jugoplastika (Socialist Federal Republic of Yugoslavia) | 151–157 | (Socialist Federal Republic of Yugoslavia) Crvena zvezda | 88–76 | 63–81 |

=== 1975–76 FIBA Korać Cup, 3rd–tier ===
The 1975–76 FIBA Korać Cup was the 5th installment of the European 3rd-tier level professional basketball club competition FIBA Korać Cup, running from October 28, 1975, to March 23, 1976. The trophy was won by Jugoplastika, who defeated Chinamartini Torino by a result of 179–166 in a two-legged final on a home and away basis. Overall, Jugoplastika achieved in present competition a record of 7 wins against 4 defeats plus 1 draw, in five successive rounds. More detailed:

==== First round ====
- Bye

==== Second round ====
- Tie played on November 18, 1975, and on November 25, 1975.

| Team 1 | Agg. | Team 2 | 1st leg | 2nd leg |
|---|---|---|---|---|
| Panellinios (Greece) | 139–168 | (Socialist Federal Republic of Yugoslavia) Jugoplastika | 78–63 | 61–105 |

==== Top 16 ====
- Tie played on January 6, 1976, and on January 13, 1976.

| Team 1 | Agg. | Team 2 | 1st leg | 2nd leg |
|---|---|---|---|---|
| Standard Liège (Belgium) | 154–165 | (Socialist Federal Republic of Yugoslavia) Jugoplastika | 83–87 | 71–78 |

- Tie played on January 20, 1976, and on January 27, 1976.

| Team 1 | Agg. | Team 2 | 1st leg | 2nd leg |
|---|---|---|---|---|
| Berck (France) | 168–169 | (Socialist Federal Republic of Yugoslavia) Jugoplastika | 99–79 | 69–90 |

- Tie played on February 3, 1976, and on February 10, 1976.

| Team 1 | Agg. | Team 2 | 1st leg | 2nd leg |
|---|---|---|---|---|
| Jugoplastika (Socialist Federal Republic of Yugoslavia) | 199–184 | (Italy) Mobilquattro Milano | 99–83 | 100–101 |

- Group B standings:

| Pos. | Team | Pld. | Pts. | W | L | PF | PA | PD |
|---|---|---|---|---|---|---|---|---|
| 1. | (Socialist Federal Republic of Yugoslavia) Jugoplastika | 3 | 6 | 3 | 0 | 533 | 506 | +27 |
| 2. | (France) Berck | 3 | 5 | 2 | 1 | 552 | 511 | +41 |
| 3. | (Belgium) Standard Liège | 3 | 4 | 1 | 2 | 495 | 524 | -29 |
| 4. | (Italy) Mobilquattro Milano | 3 | 3 | 0 | 3 | 499 | 538 | -39 |

==== Semifinals ====
- Tie played on February 24, 1976, and on March 2, 1976.

| Team 1 | Agg. | Team 2 | 1st leg | 2nd leg |
|---|---|---|---|---|
| Jugoplastika (Socialist Federal Republic of Yugoslavia) | 166–162 | (Italy) Sinudyne Bologna | 74–83 | 92-79 |

==== Finals ====
- Tie played on March 16, 1976, at Dvorana na Gripama in Split, Yugoslavia and on March 23, 1976, at Palasport Parco Ruffini in Turin, Italy.

| Team 1 | Agg. | Team 2 | 1st leg | 2nd leg |
|---|---|---|---|---|
| Jugoplastika (Socialist Federal Republic of Yugoslavia) | 179–166 | (Italy) Chinamartini Torino | 97–84 | 82–82 |

=== 1976–77 FIBA Korać Cup, 3rd–tier ===
The 1976–77 FIBA Korać Cup was the 6th installment of the European 3rd-tier level professional basketball club competition FIBA Korać Cup, running from October 19, 1976, to April 5, 1977. The trophy was won by Jugoplastika, who defeated Alco Bologna by a result of 87–84 at Palasport della Fiera in Genoa, Italy. Overall, Jugoplastika achieved in present competition a record of 6 wins against 1 defeat, in five successive rounds. More detailed:

==== First round ====
- Bye

==== Second round ====
- Bye

==== Top 12 ====
- Day 1 (January 11, 1977)

Bye

- Day 2 (January 18, 1977)

| Team 1 | Score | Team 2 |
|---|---|---|
| Jugoplastika (Socialist Federal Republic of Yugoslavia) | 88–84 | (Belgium) Standard Liège |

- Day 3 (January 25, 1977)

| Team 1 | Score | Team 2 |
|---|---|---|
| Canon Venezia (Italy) | 66–95 | (Socialist Federal Republic of Yugoslavia) Jugoplastika |

- Day 4 (February 8, 1977)

Bye

- Day 5 (February 15, 1977)

| Team 1 | Score | Team 2 |
|---|---|---|
| Standard Liège (Belgium) | 75–91 | (Socialist Federal Republic of Yugoslavia) Jugoplastika |

- Day 6 (February 22, 1977)

| Team 1 | Score | Team 2 |
|---|---|---|
| Jugoplastika (Socialist Federal Republic of Yugoslavia) | 102–88 | (Italy) Canon Venezia |

- Group D standings:

| Pos. | Team | Pld. | Pts. | W | L | PF | PA | PD | Tie-break |
|---|---|---|---|---|---|---|---|---|---|
| 1. | (Socialist Federal Republic of Yugoslavia) Jugoplastika | 4 | 8 | 4 | 0 | 376 | 313 | +63 | |
| 2. | (Italy) Canon Venezia | 4 | 5 | 1 | 3 | 323 | 365 | -42 | 1–1 (+1) |
| 3. | (Belgium) Standard Liège | 4 | 5 | 1 | 3 | 327 | 348 | -21 | 1–1 (-1) |

==== Semifinals ====
- Tie played on March 8, 1977, and on March 15, 1977.

| Team 1 | Agg. | Team 2 | 1st leg | 2nd leg |
|---|---|---|---|---|
| Jugoplastika (Socialist Federal Republic of Yugoslavia) | 172–158 | (Italy) IBP Stella Azzurra | 96–71 | 76–87 |

==== Final ====
- April 5, 1977 at Palasport della Fiera in Genoa, Italy.

| Team 1 | Score | Team 2 |
|---|---|---|
| Jugoplastika (Socialist Federal Republic of Yugoslavia) | 87–84 | (Italy) Alco Bologna |

=== 1977–78 FIBA European Champions Cup, 1st–tier ===
The 1977–78 FIBA European Champions Cup was the 21st installment of the European top-tier level professional basketball club competition FIBA European Champions Cup (now called EuroLeague), running from October 13, 1977, to April 6, 1978. The trophy was won by Real Madrid, who defeated Mobilgirgi Varese by a result of 75–67 at Olympiahalle in Munich, West Germany. Overall, Jugoplastika achieved in the present competition a record of 10 wins against 6 defeats, in two successive rounds. More detailed:

==== First round ====
- Day 1 (October 12, 1977)

| Team 1 | Score | Team 2 |
|---|---|---|
| Jugoplastika (Socialist Federal Republic of Yugoslavia) | 103–89 | (Hungary) Budapesti Honvéd |

- Day 2 (October 20, 1977)

| Team 1 | Score | Team 2 |
|---|---|---|
| Jugoplastika (Socialist Federal Republic of Yugoslavia) | 102–74 | (Greece) Panathinaikos |

- Day 3 (October 27, 1977)

| Team 1 | Score | Team 2 |
|---|---|---|
| Śląsk Wrocław (Poland) | 85–91 | (Socialist Federal Republic of Yugoslavia) Jugoplastika |

- Day 4 (November 3, 1977)

| Team 1 | Score | Team 2 |
|---|---|---|
| Budapesti Honvéd (Hungary) | 94–102 | (Socialist Federal Republic of Yugoslavia) Jugoplastika |

- Day 5 (November 17, 1977)

| Team 1 | Score | Team 2 |
|---|---|---|
| Panathinaikos (Greece) | 95–82 | (Socialist Federal Republic of Yugoslavia) Jugoplastika |

- Day 6 (November 24, 1977)

| Team 1 | Score | Team 2 |
|---|---|---|
| Jugoplastika (Socialist Federal Republic of Yugoslavia) | 99–83 | (Poland) Śląsk Wrocław |

- Group E standings:

| Pos. | Team | Pld. | Pts. | W | L | PF | PA | PD | Tie-break |
|---|---|---|---|---|---|---|---|---|---|
| 1. | (Socialist Federal Republic of Yugoslavia) Jugoplastika | 6 | 11 | 5 | 1 | 579 | 520 | +59 | 1–1 (+15) |
| 2. | (Greece) Panathinaikos | 6 | 11 | 5 | 1 | 528 | 511 | +17 | 1–1 (-15) |
| 3. | (Hungary) Budapesti Honvéd | 6 | 7 | 1 | 5 | 543 | 576 | -33 | 1–1 (+11) |
| 4. | (Poland) Śląsk Wrocław | 6 | 7 | 1 | 5 | 508 | 551 | -43 | 1–1 (-11) |

==== Semifinals ====
- Day 1 (December 8, 1977)

| Team 1 | Score | Team 2 |
|---|---|---|
| Jugoplastika (Socialist Federal Republic of Yugoslavia) | 112–111 | (Israel) Maccabi Elite Tel Aviv |

- Day 2 (December 15, 1977)

| Team 1 | Score | Team 2 |
|---|---|---|
| Real Madrid (Spain) | 116–77 | (Socialist Federal Republic of Yugoslavia) Jugoplastika |

- Day 3 (January 12, 1978)

| Team 1 | Score | Team 2 |
|---|---|---|
| Jugoplastika (Socialist Federal Republic of Yugoslavia) | 89–85 | (France) ASVEL |

- Day 4 (January 19, 1978)

| Team 1 | Score | Team 2 |
|---|---|---|
| Jugoplastika (Socialist Federal Republic of Yugoslavia) | 105–94 | (Sweden) Alvik |

- Day 5 (January 25, 1978)

| Team 1 | Score | Team 2 |
|---|---|---|
| Mobilgirgi Varese (Italy) | 79–83 | (Socialist Federal Republic of Yugoslavia) Jugoplastika |

- Day 6 (February 9, 1978)

| Team 1 | Score | Team 2 |
|---|---|---|
| Maccabi Elite Tel Aviv (Israel) | 94–74 | (Socialist Federal Republic of Yugoslavia) Jugoplastika |

- Day 7 (February 16, 1978)

| Team 1 | Score | Team 2 |
|---|---|---|
| Jugoplastika (Socialist Federal Republic of Yugoslavia) | 72–77 | (Spain) Real Madrid |

- Day 8 (March 2, 1978)

| Team 1 | Score | Team 2 |
|---|---|---|
| ASVEL (France) | 112–82 | (Socialist Federal Republic of Yugoslavia) Jugoplastika |

- Day 9 (March 9, 1978)

| Team 1 | Score | Team 2 |
|---|---|---|
| Alvik (Sweden) | 99–88 | (Socialist Federal Republic of Yugoslavia) Jugoplastika |

- Day 10 (March 16, 1978)

| Team 1 | Score | Team 2 |
|---|---|---|
| Jugoplastika (Socialist Federal Republic of Yugoslavia) | 117–95 | (Italy) Mobilgirgi Varese |

- Semifinals group stage standings:

| Pos. | Team | Pld. | Pts. | W | L | PF | PA | PD | Tie-break |
|---|---|---|---|---|---|---|---|---|---|
| 1. | (Spain) Real Madrid | 10 | 17 | 7 | 3 | 1017 | 874 | +133 | |
| 2. | (Italy) Mobilgirgi Varese | 10 | 16 | 6 | 4 | 896 | 852 | +44 | |
| 3. | (France) ASVEL | 10 | 15 | 5 | 5 | 914 | 902 | +12 | 2–2 (+27) |
| 4. | (Israel) Maccabi Elite Tel Aviv | 10 | 15 | 5 | 5 | 904 | 898 | +6 | 2–2 (+20) |
| 5. | (Socialist Federal Republic of Yugoslavia) Jugoplastika | 10 | 15 | 5 | 5 | 899 | 962 | -63 | 2–2 (-45) |
| 6. | (Sweden) Alvik | 10 | 12 | 2 | 8 | 879 | 1021 | -142 | |

=== 1978–79 FIBA Korać Cup, 3rd–tier ===
The 1978–79 FIBA Korać Cup was the 8th installment of the European 3rd-tier level professional basketball club competition FIBA Korać Cup, running from October 31, 1978, to March 20, 1979. The trophy was won by Partizan, who defeated Arrigoni Rieti by a result of 108–98 at Hala Pionir in Belgrade, Yugoslavia. Overall, Jugoplastika achieved in present competition a record of 7 wins against 3 defeats, in four successive rounds. More detailed:

==== First round ====
- Bye

==== Second round ====
- Tie played on November 21, 1978, and on November 28, 1978.

| Team 1 | Agg. | Team 2 | 1st leg | 2nd leg |
|---|---|---|---|---|
| Vevey (Switzerland) | 160–228 | (Socialist Federal Republic of Yugoslavia) Jugoplastika | 79–106 | 81–122 |

==== Top 16 ====
- Day 1 (January 9, 1979)

| Team 1 | Score | Team 2 |
|---|---|---|
| Éveil Monceau (Belgium) | 83–99 | (Socialist Federal Republic of Yugoslavia) Jugoplastika |

- Day 2 (January 16, 1979)

| Team 1 | Score | Team 2 |
|---|---|---|
| Caen (France) | 81–75 | (Socialist Federal Republic of Yugoslavia) Jugoplastika |

- Day 3 (January 23, 1979)

| Team 1 | Score | Team 2 |
|---|---|---|
| Jugoplastika (Socialist Federal Republic of Yugoslavia) | 92–77 | (Czechoslovakia) Slavia VŠ Praha |

- Day 4 (January 30, 1979)

| Team 1 | Score | Team 2 |
|---|---|---|
| Jugoplastika (Socialist Federal Republic of Yugoslavia) | 93–73 | (Belgium) Éveil Monceau |

- Day 5 (February 6, 1979)

| Team 1 | Score | Team 2 |
|---|---|---|
| Jugoplastika (Socialist Federal Republic of Yugoslavia) | 96–75 | (France) Caen |

- Day 6 (February 13, 1979)

| Team 1 | Score | Team 2 |
|---|---|---|
| Slavia VŠ Praha (Czechoslovakia) | 84–91 | (Socialist Federal Republic of Yugoslavia) Jugoplastika |

- Group C standings:

| Pos. | Team | Pld. | Pts. | W | L | PF | PA | PD |
|---|---|---|---|---|---|---|---|---|
| 1. | (Socialist Federal Republic of Yugoslavia) Jugoplastika | 6 | 11 | 5 | 1 | 546 | 473 | +53 |
| 2. | (France) Caen | 6 | 10 | 4 | 2 | 501 | 463 | +38 |
| 3. | (Czechoslovakia) Slavia VŠ Praha | 6 | 8 | 2 | 4 | 462 | 514 | -52 |
| 4. | (Belgium) Éveil Monceau | 6 | 7 | 1 | 5 | 488 | 547 | -59 |

==== Semifinals ====
- Tie played on February 27, 1979, and on March 6, 1979.

| Team 1 | Agg. | Team 2 | 1st leg | 2nd leg |
|---|---|---|---|---|
| Jugoplastika (Socialist Federal Republic of Yugoslavia) | 192–195 | (Socialist Federal Republic of Yugoslavia) Partizan | 96–97 | 96–98 |

== 1980s ==
=== 1979–80 FIBA Korać Cup, 3rd–tier ===
The 1979–80 FIBA Korać Cup was the 9th installment of the European 3rd-tier level professional basketball club competition FIBA Korać Cup, running from October 31, 1979, to March 26, 1980. The trophy was won by Arrigoni Rieti, who defeated Cibona by a result of 76–71 at Country Hall du Sart Tilman in Liège, Belgium. Overall, Jugoplastika achieved in the present competition a record of 7 wins against 1 defeat, in four successive rounds. More detailed:

==== First round ====
- Bye

==== Second round ====
- Bye

==== Top 16 ====
- Day 1 (January 9, 1980)

| Team 1 | Score | Team 2 |
|---|---|---|
| Superga Mestre (Italy) | 78–81 | (Socialist Federal Republic of Yugoslavia) Jugoplastika |

- Day 2 (January 16, 1980)

| Team 1 | Score | Team 2 |
|---|---|---|
| Jugoplastika (Socialist Federal Republic of Yugoslavia) | 114–95 | (Spain) Miñón Valladolid |

- Day 3 (January 23, 1980)

| Team 1 | Score | Team 2 |
|---|---|---|
| Standard Liège (Belgium) | 99–101 | (Socialist Federal Republic of Yugoslavia) Jugoplastika |

- Day 4 (February 6, 1980)

| Team 1 | Score | Team 2 |
|---|---|---|
| Jugoplastika (Socialist Federal Republic of Yugoslavia) | 105–76 | (Italy) Superga Mestre |

- Day 5 (February 12, 1980)

| Team 1 | Score | Team 2 |
|---|---|---|
| Miñón Valladolid (Spain) | 102–103 | (Socialist Federal Republic of Yugoslavia) Jugoplastika |

- Day 6 (February 20, 1980)

| Team 1 | Score | Team 2 |
|---|---|---|
| Jugoplastika (Socialist Federal Republic of Yugoslavia) | 86–77 | (Belgium) Standard Liège |

- Group D standings:

| Pos. | Team | Pld. | Pts. | W | L | PF | PA | PD |
|---|---|---|---|---|---|---|---|---|
| 1. | (Socialist Federal Republic of Yugoslavia) Jugoplastika | 6 | 12 | 6 | 0 | 590 | 527 | +63 |
| 2. | (Italy) Superga Mestre | 6 | 9 | 3 | 3 | 530 | 540 | -10 |
| 3. | (Spain) Miñón Valladolid | 6 | 8 | 2 | 4 | 586 | 607 | -21 |
| 4. | (Belgium) Standard Liège | 6 | 7 | 1 | 5 | 551 | 583 | -32 |

==== Semifinals ====
- Tie played on March 5, 1980, and on March 12, 1980.

| Team 1 | Agg. | Team 2 | 1st leg | 2nd leg |
|---|---|---|---|---|
| Arrigoni Rieti (Italy) | 183–179 | (Socialist Federal Republic of Yugoslavia) Jugoplastika | 86–75 | 97–104* |

^{*}The score in the second leg at the end of regulation was 97–86 for Jugoplastika, so it was necessary to play an extra-time to decide the winner of this match.

=== 1980–81 FIBA Korać Cup, 3rd–tier ===
The 1980–81 FIBA Korać Cup was the 10th installment of the European 3rd-tier level professional basketball club competition FIBA Korać Cup, running from October 8, 1980, to March 19, 1981. The trophy was won by Joventut Freixenet, who defeated Carrera Venezia by a result of 105–104 (Overtime (sports)|OT) at Palau Blaugrana in Barcelona, Spain. Overall, Jugoplastika achieved in the present competition a record of 2 wins against 4 defeats, in three successive rounds. More detailed:

==== First round ====
- Bye

==== Second round ====
- Bye

==== Top 16 ====
- Day 1 (December 10, 1980)

| Team 1 | Score | Team 2 |
|---|---|---|
| Zbrojovka Brno (Czechoslovakia) | 90–96 | (Socialist Federal Republic of Yugoslavia) Jugoplastika |

- Day 2 (December 17, 1980)

| Team 1 | Score | Team 2 |
|---|---|---|
| Jugoplastika (Socialist Federal Republic of Yugoslavia) | 85–101 | (Italy) Carrera Venezia |

- Day 3 (January 14, 1981)

| Team 1 | Score | Team 2 |
|---|---|---|
| Aris (Greece) | 87–83 | (Socialist Federal Republic of Yugoslavia) Jugoplastika |

- Day 4 (January 21, 1981)

| Team 1 | Score | Team 2 |
|---|---|---|
| Jugoplastika (Socialist Federal Republic of Yugoslavia) | 102–110 | (Czechoslovakia) Zbrojovka Brno |

- Day 5 (January 28, 1981)

| Team 1 | Score | Team 2 |
|---|---|---|
| Carrera Venezia (Italy) | 107–100 | (Socialist Federal Republic of Yugoslavia) Jugoplastika |

- Day 6 (February 4, 1981)

| Team 1 | Score | Team 2 |
|---|---|---|
| Jugoplastika (Socialist Federal Republic of Yugoslavia) | 110–93 | (Greece) Aris |

- Group C standings:

| Pos. | Team | Pld. | Pts. | W | L | PF | PA | PD | Tie-break |
|---|---|---|---|---|---|---|---|---|---|
| 1. | (Italy) Carrera Venezia | 6 | 12 | 6 | 0 | 609 | 534 | +75 | |
| 2. | (Czechoslovakia) Zbrojovka Brno | 6 | 8 | 2 | 4 | 587 | 582 | +5 | 2–2 (+19) |
| 3. | (Socialist Federal Republic of Yugoslavia) Jugoplastika | 6 | 8 | 2 | 4 | 576 | 588 | -12 | 2–2 (+14) |
| 4. | (Greece) Aris | 6 | 8 | 2 | 4 | 527 | 595 | -68 | 2–2 (-30) |

=== 1985–86 FIBA European Cup Winners' Cup, 2nd–tier ===
The 1985–86 FIBA European Cup Winners' Cup was the 20th installment of FIBA's 2nd-tier level European-wide professional club basketball competition FIBA European Cup Winners' Cup (lately called FIBA Saporta Cup), running from October 1, 1985, to March 18, 1986. The trophy was won by FC Barcelona, who defeated Scavolini Pesaro by a result of 101–86 at PalaMaggiò di Castel Morrone in Caserta, Italy. Overall, Jugoplastika achieved in the present competition a record of 6 wins against 4 defeats, in three successive rounds. More detailed:

==== First round ====
- Tie played on October 29, 1985, and on November 5, 1985.

| Team 1 | Agg. | Team 2 | 1st leg | 2nd leg |
|---|---|---|---|---|
| CSKA Sofia (Bulgaria) | 172–183 | (Socialist Federal Republic of Yugoslavia) Jugoplastika | 85–84 | 87–99 |

==== Top 16 ====
- Tie played on October 1, 1985, and on October 8, 1985.

| Team 1 | Agg. | Team 2 | 1st leg | 2nd leg |
|---|---|---|---|---|
| Jugoplastika (Socialist Federal Republic of Yugoslavia) | 201–164 | (Israel) Maccabi Haifa | 114–78 | 87–86 |

==== Quarterfinals ====
- Day 1 (December 3, 1985)

| Team 1 | Score | Team 2 |
|---|---|---|
| Jugoplastika (Socialist Federal Republic of Yugoslavia) | 111–81 | (Austria) Landys&Gyr Wien |

- Day 2 (December 10, 1985)

| Team 1 | Score | Team 2 |
|---|---|---|
| Jugoplastika (Socialist Federal Republic of Yugoslavia) | 90–99 | (Spain) FC Barcelona |

- Day 3 (January 7, 1986)

| Team 1 | Score | Team 2 |
|---|---|---|
| Scavolini Pesaro (Italy) | 101–97 | (Socialist Federal Republic of Yugoslavia) Jugoplastika |

- Day 4 (January 14, 1986)

| Team 1 | Score | Team 2 |
|---|---|---|
| Landys&Gyr Wien (Austria) | 82–122 | (Socialist Federal Republic of Yugoslavia) Jugoplastika |

- Day 5 (January 21, 1986)

| Team 1 | Score | Team 2 |
|---|---|---|
| FC Barcelona (Spain) | 103–98 | (Socialist Federal Republic of Yugoslavia) Jugoplastika |

- Day 6 (January 28, 1986)

| Team 1 | Score | Team 2 |
|---|---|---|
| Jugoplastika (Socialist Federal Republic of Yugoslavia) | 108–91 | (Italy) Scavolini Pesaro |

- Group A standings:

| Pos. | Team | Pld. | Pts. | W | L | PF | PA | PD |
|---|---|---|---|---|---|---|---|---|
| 1. | (Spain) FC Barcelona | 6 | 11 | 5 | 1 | 670 | 575 | +95 |
| 2. | (Italy) Scavolini Pesaro | 6 | 10 | 4 | 2 | 632 | 617 | +15 |
| 3. | (Socialist Federal Republic of Yugoslavia) Jugoplastika | 6 | 9 | 3 | 3 | 626 | 557 | +69 |
| 4. | (Austria) Landys&Gyr Wien | 6 | 6 | 0 | 6 | 526 | 705 | -179 |

=== 1986–87 FIBA Korać Cup, 3rd–tier ===
The 1986–87 FIBA Korać Cup was the 16th installment of the European 3rd-tier level professional basketball club competition FIBA Korać Cup, running from October 1, 1986, to March 25, 1987. The trophy was won by FC Barcelona, who defeated Limoges CSP by a result of 203–171 in a two-legged final on a home and away basis. Overall, Jugoplastika achieved in present competition a record of 5 wins against 5 defeats, in three successive rounds. More detailed:

==== First round ====
- Tie played on October 1, 1986, and on October 8, 1986.

| Team 1 | Agg. | Team 2 | 1st leg | 2nd leg |
|---|---|---|---|---|
| CEP Fleurus (Belgium) | 182–203 | (Socialist Federal Republic of Yugoslavia) Jugoplastika | 104–103 | 78–100 |

==== Second round ====
- Tie played on October 29, 1986, and on November 5, 1986.

| Team 1 | Agg. | Team 2 | 1st leg | 2nd leg |
|---|---|---|---|---|
| Fribourg Olympic (Switzerland) | 146–239 | (Socialist Federal Republic of Yugoslavia) Jugoplastika | 81–119 | 65–120 |

==== Top 16 ====
- Day 1 (December 3, 1986)

| Team 1 | Score | Team 2 |
|---|---|---|
| Jugoplastika (Socialist Federal Republic of Yugoslavia) | 84–76 | (Italy) Divarese Varese |

- Day 2 (December 9, 1986)

| Team 1 | Score | Team 2 |
|---|---|---|
| Jugoplastika (Socialist Federal Republic of Yugoslavia) | 77–86 | (Spain) FC Barcelona |

- Day 3 (January 7, 1987)

| Team 1 | Score | Team 2 |
|---|---|---|
| Olympique Antibes (France) | 101–81 | (Socialist Federal Republic of Yugoslavia) Jugoplastika |

- Day 4 (January 14, 1987)

| Team 1 | Score | Team 2 |
|---|---|---|
| Divarese Varese (Italy) | 105–90 | (Socialist Federal Republic of Yugoslavia) Jugoplastika |

- Day 5 (January 20, 1987)

| Team 1 | Score | Team 2 |
|---|---|---|
| FC Barcelona (Spain) | 105–68 | (Socialist Federal Republic of Yugoslavia) Jugoplastika |

- Day 6 (January 28, 1987)

| Team 1 | Score | Team 2 |
|---|---|---|
| Jugoplastika (Socialist Federal Republic of Yugoslavia) | 93–91 | (France) Olympique Antibes |

- Group B standings:

| Pos. | Team | Pld. | Pts. | W | L | PF | PA | PD | Tie-break |
|---|---|---|---|---|---|---|---|---|---|
| 1. | (Spain) FC Barcelona | 6 | 10 | 4 | 2 | 555 | 468 | +87 | |
| 2. | (Italy) Divarese Varese | 6 | 9 | 3 | 3 | 525 | 507 | +18 | 1–1 (+20) |
| 3. | (France) Olympique Antibes | 6 | 9 | 3 | 3 | 533 | 567 | -34 | 1–1 (-20) |
| 4. | (Socialist Federal Republic of Yugoslavia) Jugoplastika | 6 | 8 | 2 | 4 | 493 | 564 | -71 | |

=== 1987–88 FIBA Korać Cup, 3rd–tier ===
The 1987–88 FIBA Korać Cup was the 17th installment of the European 3rd-tier level professional basketball club competition FIBA Korać Cup, running from September 23, 1987, to March 9, 1988. The trophy was won by Real Madrid, who defeated Cibona by a result of 195–183 in a two-legged final on a home and away basis. Overall, Jugoplastika achieved in present competition a record of 7 wins against 3 defeats, in three successive rounds. More detailed:

==== First round ====
- Tie played on September 23, 1987, and on September 30, 1987.

| Team 1 | Agg. | Team 2 | 1st leg | 2nd leg |
|---|---|---|---|---|
| Budapesti Honvéd (Hungary) | 142–205 | (Socialist Federal Republic of Yugoslavia) Jugoplastika | 78–102 | 64–103 |

==== Second round ====
- Tie played on October 14, 1987, and on October 21, 1987.

| Team 1 | Agg. | Team 2 | 1st leg | 2nd leg |
|---|---|---|---|---|
| Jugoplastika (Socialist Federal Republic of Yugoslavia) | 224–156 | (Turkey) Beslen Makarna | 114–73 | 110–83 |

==== Top 16 ====
- Day 1 (December 2, 1987)

| Team 1 | Score | Team 2 |
|---|---|---|
| Jugoplastika (Socialist Federal Republic of Yugoslavia) | 87–83 | (Spain) CAI Zaragoza |

- Day 2 (December 9, 1987)

| Team 1 | Score | Team 2 |
|---|---|---|
| Arexons Cantù (Italy) | 93–75 | (Socialist Federal Republic of Yugoslavia) Jugoplastika |

- Day 3 (December 16, 1987)

| Team 1 | Score | Team 2 |
|---|---|---|
| Jugoplastika (Socialist Federal Republic of Yugoslavia) | 86–83* | (Israel) Hapoel Tel Aviv |

^{*}Overtime at the end of regulation (77–77).

- Day 4 (January 6, 1988)

| Team 1 | Score | Team 2 |
|---|---|---|
| CAI Zaragoza (Spain) | 88–77 | (Socialist Federal Republic of Yugoslavia) Jugoplastika |

- Day 5 (January 13, 1988)

| Team 1 | Score | Team 2 |
|---|---|---|
| Jugoplastika (Socialist Federal Republic of Yugoslavia) | 83–77 | (Italy) Arexons Cantù |

- Day 6 (January 20, 1988)

| Team 1 | Score | Team 2 |
|---|---|---|
| Hapoel Tel Aviv (Israel) | 77–65 | (Socialist Federal Republic of Yugoslavia) Jugoplastika |

- Group D standings:

| Pos. | Team | Pld. | Pts. | W | L | PF | PA | PD | Tie-break |
|---|---|---|---|---|---|---|---|---|---|
| 1. | (Israel) Hapoel Tel Aviv | 6 | 10 | 4 | 2 | 521 | 506 | +15 | |
| 2. | (Italy) Arexons Cantù | 6 | 9 | 3 | 3 | 528 | 521 | +7 | 1–1 (+12) |
| 3. | (Socialist Federal Republic of Yugoslavia) Jugoplastika | 6 | 9 | 3 | 3 | 473 | 501 | -28 | 1–1 (-12) |
| 4. | (Spain) CAI Zaragoza | 6 | 8 | 2 | 4 | 530 | 524 | +6 | |

=== 1988–89 FIBA European Champions Cup, 1st–tier ===
The 1988–89 FIBA European Champions Cup was the 32nd installment of the European top-tier level professional basketball club competition FIBA European Champions Cup (now called EuroLeague), running from October 13, 1988, to April 6, 1989. The trophy was won by Jugoplastika, who defeated Maccabi Elite Tel Aviv by a result of 75–69 at Olympiahalle in Munich, West Germany. Overall, Jugoplastika achieved in the present competition a record of 12 wins against 6 defeats, in five successive rounds. More detailed:

==== First round ====
- Bye

==== Top 16 ====
- Tie played on November 3, 1988, and on November 10, 1988.

| Team 1 | Agg. | Team 2 | 1st leg | 2nd leg |
|---|---|---|---|---|
| Ovarense (Portugal) | 163-207 | (Socialist Federal Republic of Yugoslavia) Jugoplastika | 87–94 | 76–113 |

==== Quarterfinals ====
- Day 1 (December 8, 1988)

| Team 1 | Score | Team 2 |
|---|---|---|
| Jugoplastika (Socialist Federal Republic of Yugoslavia) | 87–78 | (France) Limoges CSP |

- Day 2 (December 15, 1988)

| Team 1 | Score | Team 2 |
|---|---|---|
| Scavolini Pesaro (Italy) | 88–75 | (Socialist Federal Republic of Yugoslavia) Jugoplastika |

- Day 3 (December 22, 1988)

| Team 1 | Score | Team 2 |
|---|---|---|
| Jugoplastika (Socialist Federal Republic of Yugoslavia) | 86–79 | (Netherlands) Nashua EBBC |

- Day 4 (January 4, 1989)

| Team 1 | Score | Team 2 |
|---|---|---|
| FC Barcelona (Spain) | 79–70 | (Socialist Federal Republic of Yugoslavia) Jugoplastika |

- Day 5 (January 12, 1989)

| Team 1 | Score | Team 2 |
|---|---|---|
| Jugoplastika (Socialist Federal Republic of Yugoslavia) | 94–83 | (Greece) Aris |

- Day 6 (January 19, 1989)

| Team 1 | Score | Team 2 |
|---|---|---|
| Jugoplastika (Socialist Federal Republic of Yugoslavia) | 89–77 | (Soviet Union) CSKA Moscow |

- Day 7 (January 26, 1989)

| Team 1 | Score | Team 2 |
|---|---|---|
| Jugoplastika (Socialist Federal Republic of Yugoslavia) | 85–86 | (Israel) Maccabi Elite Tel Aviv |

- Day 8 (February 1, 1989)

| Team 1 | Score | Team 2 |
|---|---|---|
| Limoges CSP (France) | 95–93 | (Socialist Federal Republic of Yugoslavia) Jugoplastika |

- Day 9 (February 16, 1989)

| Team 1 | Score | Team 2 |
|---|---|---|
| Jugoplastika (Socialist Federal Republic of Yugoslavia) | 88–65 | (Italy) Scavolini Pesaro |

- Day 10 (February 22, 1989)

| Team 1 | Score | Team 2 |
|---|---|---|
| Nashua EBBC (Netherlands) | 83–88 | (Socialist Federal Republic of Yugoslavia) Jugoplastika |

- Day 11 (March 2, 1989)

| Team 1 | Score | Team 2 |
|---|---|---|
| Jugoplastika (Socialist Federal Republic of Yugoslavia) | 84–79 | (Spain) FC Barcelona |

- Day 12 (March 9, 1989)

| Team 1 | Score | Team 2 |
|---|---|---|
| Aris (Greece) | 96–85 | (Socialist Federal Republic of Yugoslavia) Jugoplastika |

- Day 13 (March 16, 1989)

| Team 1 | Score | Team 2 |
|---|---|---|
| CSKA Moscow (Soviet Union) | 77–91 | (Socialist Federal Republic of Yugoslavia) Jugoplastika |

- Day 14 (March 23, 1989)

| Team 1 | Score | Team 2 |
|---|---|---|
| Maccabi Elite Tel Aviv (Israel) | 102–90 | (Socialist Federal Republic of Yugoslavia) Jugoplastika |

- Quarterfinals group stage standings:

| Pos. | Team | Pld. | Pts. | W | L | PF | PA | PD | Tie-break |
|---|---|---|---|---|---|---|---|---|---|
| 1. | (Israel) Maccabi Elite Tel Aviv | 14 | 26 | 12 | 2 | 1314 | 1221 | +93 | |
| 2. | (Spain) FC Barcelona | 14 | 25 | 11 | 3 | 1207 | 1120 | +87 | |
| 3. | (Socialist Federal Republic of Yugoslavia) Jugoplastika | 14 | 22 | 8 | 6 | 1205 | 1167 | +38 | 1–1 (0) |
| 4. | (Greece) Aris | 14 | 22 | 8 | 6 | 1269 | 1261 | +8 | 1–1 (0) |
| 5. | (France) Limoges CSP | 14 | 20 | 6 | 8 | 1269 | 1266 | +3 | |
| 6. | (Italy) Scavolini Pesaro | 14 | 19 | 5 | 9 | 1130 | 1174 | -44 | |
| 7. | (Soviet Union) CSKA Moscow | 14 | 18 | 4 | 10 | 1156 | 1194 | -38 | |
| 8. | (Netherlands) Nashua EBBC | 14 | 16 | 2 | 12 | 1159 | 1306 | -147 | |

==== Final four ====
The 1989 FIBA European Champions Cup Final Four, was the 1988–89 season's FIBA European Champions Cup Final Four tournament, organized by FIBA Europe.

- Semifinals: April 4, 1989 at Olympiahalle in Munich, West Germany.

| Team 1 | Score | Team 2 |
|---|---|---|
| FC Barcelona (Spain) | 77–87 | (Socialist Federal Republic of Yugoslavia) Jugoplastika |

- Final: April 6, 1989 at Olympiahalle in Munich, West Germany.

| Team 1 | Score | Team 2 |
|---|---|---|
| Maccabi Elite Tel Aviv (Israel) | 69–75 | (Socialist Federal Republic of Yugoslavia) Jugoplastika |

- Final four standings:

| Pos. | Team | Rec. |
|---|---|---|
| | (Socialist Federal Republic of Yugoslavia) Jugoplastika | 2–0 |
| Silver medal | (Israel) Maccabi Elite Tel Aviv | 1–1 |
| Bronze medal | (Greece) Aris | 1–1 |
| 4th | (Spain) FC Barcelona | 0–2 |

== 1990s ==
=== 1989–90 FIBA European Champions Cup, 1st–tier ===
The 1989–90 FIBA European Champions Cup was the 33rd installment of the European top-tier level professional basketball club competition FIBA European Champions Cup (now called EuroLeague), running from September 28, 1989, to April 19, 1990. The trophy was won by Jugoplastika, who defeated FC Barcelona Banca Catalana by a result of 72–67 at Pabellón Príncipe Felipe in Zaragoza, Spain. Overall, Jugoplastika achieved in the present competition a record of 15 wins against 3 defeats, in five successive rounds. More detailed:

==== First round ====
- Bye

==== Top 16 ====
- Tie played on October 26, 1989, and on November 2, 1989.

| Team 1 | Agg. | Team 2 | 1st leg | 2nd leg |
|---|---|---|---|---|
| MIM Livingston (Scotland) | 149–219 | (Socialist Federal Republic of Yugoslavia) Jugoplastika | 84–97 | 65–122 |

==== Quarterfinals ====
- Day 1 (December 7, 1989)

| Team 1 | Score | Team 2 |
|---|---|---|
| Jugoplastika (Socialist Federal Republic of Yugoslavia) | 86–73 | (Spain) FC Barcelona Banca Catalana |

- Day 2 (December 14, 1989)

| Team 1 | Score | Team 2 |
|---|---|---|
| Philips Milano (Italy) | 73–84 | (Socialist Federal Republic of Yugoslavia) Jugoplastika |

- Day 3 (January 4, 1990)

| Team 1 | Score | Team 2 |
|---|---|---|
| Jugoplastika (Socialist Federal Republic of Yugoslavia) | 103–83 | (France) Limoges CSP |

- Day 4 (January 11, 1990)

| Team 1 | Score | Team 2 |
|---|---|---|
| Commodore Den Helder (Netherlands) | 76–83 | (Socialist Federal Republic of Yugoslavia) Jugoplastika |

- Day 5 (January 18, 1990)

| Team 1 | Score | Team 2 |
|---|---|---|
| Jugoplastika (Socialist Federal Republic of Yugoslavia) | 79–61 | (Israel) Maccabi Elite Tel Aviv |

- Day 6 (January 25, 1990)

| Team 1 | Score | Team 2 |
|---|---|---|
| Jugoplastika (Socialist Federal Republic of Yugoslavia) | 85–89 | (Greece) Aris |

- Day 7 (February 1, 1990)

| Team 1 | Score | Team 2 |
|---|---|---|
| Lech Poznań (Poland) | 73–120 | (Socialist Federal Republic of Yugoslavia) Jugoplastika |

- Day 8 (February 7, 1990)

| Team 1 | Score | Team 2 |
|---|---|---|
| FC Barcelona Banca Catalana (Spain) | 79–73 | (Socialist Federal Republic of Yugoslavia) Jugoplastika |

- Day 9 (February 22, 1990)

| Team 1 | Score | Team 2 |
|---|---|---|
| Jugoplastika (Socialist Federal Republic of Yugoslavia) | 95–89 | (Italy) Philips Milano |

- Day 10 (March 1, 1990)

| Team 1 | Score | Team 2 |
|---|---|---|
| Limoges CSP (France) | 100–93 | (Socialist Federal Republic of Yugoslavia) Jugoplastika |

- Day 11 (March 8, 1990)

| Team 1 | Score | Team 2 |
|---|---|---|
| Jugoplastika (Socialist Federal Republic of Yugoslavia) | 105–78 | (Netherlands) Commodore Den Helder |

- Day 12 (March 15, 1990)

| Team 1 | Score | Team 2 |
|---|---|---|
| Maccabi Elite Tel Aviv (Israel) | 87–93 | (Socialist Federal Republic of Yugoslavia) Jugoplastika |

- Day 13 (March 22, 1990)

| Team 1 | Score | Team 2 |
|---|---|---|
| Aris (Greece) | 79–80 | (Socialist Federal Republic of Yugoslavia) Jugoplastika |

- Day 14 (March 29, 1990)

| Team 1 | Score | Team 2 |
|---|---|---|
| Jugoplastika (Socialist Federal Republic of Yugoslavia) | 98–74 | (Poland) Lech Poznań |

- Quarterfinals group stage standings:

| Pos. | Team | Pld. | Pts. | W | L | PF | PA | PD |
|---|---|---|---|---|---|---|---|---|
| 1. | (Spain) FC Barcelona Banca Catalana | 14 | 26 | 12 | 2 | 1291 | 1084 | +207 |
| 2. | (Socialist Federal Republic of Yugoslavia) Jugoplastika | 14 | 25 | 11 | 3 | 1277 | 1114 | +163 |
| 3. | (France) Limoges CSP | 14 | 24 | 10 | 4 | 1320 | 1217 | +103 |
| 4. | (Greece) Aris | 14 | 22 | 8 | 6 | 1296 | 1224 | +72 |
| 5. | (Italy) Philips Milano | 14 | 21 | 7 | 7 | 1271 | 1279 | -8 |
| 6. | (Israel) Maccabi Elite Tel Aviv | 14 | 20 | 6 | 8 | 1185 | 1241 | -56 |
| 7. | (Netherlands) Commodore Den Helder | 14 | 16 | 2 | 12 | 1147 | 1291 | -144 |
| 8. | (Poland) Lech Poznań | 14 | 14 | 0 | 14 | 1147 | 1484 | -337 |

==== Final four ====
The 1990 FIBA European Champions Cup Final Four, was the 1989–90 season's FIBA European Champions Cup Final Four tournament, organized by FIBA Europe.

- Semifinals: April 17, 1990 at Pabellón Príncipe Felipe in Zaragoza, Spain.

| Team 1 | Score | Team 2 |
|---|---|---|
| Jugoplastika (Socialist Federal Republic of Yugoslavia) | 101–83 | (France) Limoges CSP |

- Final: April 19, 1990 at Pabellón Príncipe Felipe in Zaragoza, Spain.

| Team 1 | Score | Team 2 |
|---|---|---|
| FC Barcelona Banca Catalana (Spain) | 67–72 | (Socialist Federal Republic of Yugoslavia) Jugoplastika |

- Final four standings:

| Pos. | Team | Rec. |
|---|---|---|
| | (Socialist Federal Republic of Yugoslavia) Jugoplastika | 2–0 |
| Silver medal | (Spain) FC Barcelona Banca Catalana | 1–1 |
| Bronze medal | (France) Limoges CSP | 1–1 |
| 4th | (Greece) Aris | 0–2 |

=== 1990–91 FIBA European Champions Cup, 1st–tier ===
The 1990–91 FIBA European Champions Cup was the 34th installment of the European top-tier level professional basketball club competition FIBA European Champions Cup (now called EuroLeague), running from September 27, 1990, to April 18, 1991. The trophy was won by POP 84, who defeated FC Barcelona Banca Catalana by a result of 70–65 at Palais Omnisports de Paris-Bercy in Paris, France. Overall, POP 84 achieved in the present competition a record of 13 wins against 5 defeats, in five successive rounds. More detailed:

==== First round ====
- Bye

==== Top 16 ====
- Tie played on October 25, 1990, and on November 1, 1990.

| Team 1 | Agg. | Team 2 | 1st leg | 2nd leg |
|---|---|---|---|---|
| Galatasaray (Turkey) | 156–198 | (Socialist Federal Republic of Yugoslavia) POP 84 | 86–97 | 70–101 |

==== Quarterfinals ====
- Day 1 (December 13, 1990)

| Team 1 | Score | Team 2 |
|---|---|---|
| POP 84 (Socialist Federal Republic of Yugoslavia) | 86–66 | (Italy) Scavolini Pesaro |

- Day 2 (December 20, 1990)

| Team 1 | Score | Team 2 |
|---|---|---|
| Kingston (England) | 87–89* | (Socialist Federal Republic of Yugoslavia) POP 84 |

^{*}Overtime at the end of regulation (79–79).

- Day 3 (January 3, 1991)

| Team 1 | Score | Team 2 |
|---|---|---|
| POP 84 (Socialist Federal Republic of Yugoslavia) | 87–91 | (Spain) FC Barcelona Banca Catalana |

- Day 4 (January 10, 1991)

| Team 1 | Score | Team 2 |
|---|---|---|
| Aris (Greece) | 92–71 | (Socialist Federal Republic of Yugoslavia) POP 84 |

- Day 5 (January 17, 1991)

| Team 1 | Score | Team 2 |
|---|---|---|
| POP 84 (Socialist Federal Republic of Yugoslavia) | 85–84 | (Germany) Bayer 04 Leverkusen |

- Day 6 (January 24, 1991)

| Team 1 | Score | Team 2 |
|---|---|---|
| POP 84 (Socialist Federal Republic of Yugoslavia) | 70–72 | (Israel) Maccabi Elite Tel Aviv |

- Day 7 (January 31, 1991)

| Team 1 | Score | Team 2 |
|---|---|---|
| Limoges CSP (France) | 73–84 | (Socialist Federal Republic of Yugoslavia) POP 84 |

- Day 8 (February 7, 1991)

| Team 1 | Score | Team 2 |
|---|---|---|
| Scavolini Pesaro (Italy) | 105–106 | (Socialist Federal Republic of Yugoslavia) POP 84 |

- Day 9 (February 14, 1991)

| Team 1 | Score | Team 2 |
|---|---|---|
| POP 84 (Socialist Federal Republic of Yugoslavia) | 91–72 | (England) Kingston |

- Day 10 (February 28, 1991)

| Team 1 | Score | Team 2 |
|---|---|---|
| FC Barcelona Banca Catalana (Spain) | 92–85 | (Socialist Federal Republic of Yugoslavia) POP 84 |

- Day 11 (March 7, 1991)

| Team 1 | Score | Team 2 |
|---|---|---|
| POP 84 (Socialist Federal Republic of Yugoslavia) | 93–63 | (Greece) Aris |

- Day 12 (March 14, 1991)

| Team 1 | Score | Team 2 |
|---|---|---|
| Bayer 04 Leverkusen (Germany) | 87–103 | (Socialist Federal Republic of Yugoslavia) POP 84 |

- Day 13 (March 21, 1991)

| Team 1 | Score | Team 2 |
|---|---|---|
| Maccabi Elite Tel Aviv (Israel) | 103–65 | (Socialist Federal Republic of Yugoslavia) POP 84 |

- Day 14 (March 28, 1991)

| Team 1 | Score | Team 2 |
|---|---|---|
| POP 84 (Socialist Federal Republic of Yugoslavia) | 92–88 | (France) Limoges CSP |

- Quarterfinals group stage standings:

| Pos. | Team | Pld. | Pts. | W | L | PF | PA | PD | Tie-break |
|---|---|---|---|---|---|---|---|---|---|
| 1. | (Spain) FC Barcelona Banca Catalana | 14 | 25 | 11 | 3 | 1276 | 1148 | +128 | |
| 2. | (Socialist Federal Republic of Yugoslavia) POP 84 | 14 | 23 | 9 | 5 | 1208 | 1174 | +34 | |
| 3. | (Italy) Scavolini Pesaro | 14 | 22 | 8 | 6 | 1318 | 1290 | +28 | 2–0 |
| 4. | (Israel) Maccabi Elite Tel Aviv | 14 | 22 | 8 | 6 | 1224 | 1163 | +61 | 0–2 |
| 5. | (Greece) Aris | 14 | 21 | 7 | 7 | 1314 | 1324 | -10 | |
| 6. | (Germany) Bayer 04 Leverkusen | 14 | 20 | 6 | 8 | 1334 | 1392 | -58 | |
| 7. | (England) Kingston | 14 | 18 | 4 | 10 | 1141 | 1221 | -80 | |
| 8. | (France) Limoges CSP | 14 | 17 | 3 | 11 | 1251 | 1354 | -104 | |

==== Final four ====
The 1991 FIBA European Champions Cup Final Four, was the 1990–91 season's FIBA European Champions Cup Final Four tournament, organized by FIBA Europe.

- Semifinals: April 16, 1991 at Palais Omnisports de Paris-Bercy in Paris, France.

| Team 1 | Score | Team 2 |
|---|---|---|
| POP 84 (Socialist Federal Republic of Yugoslavia) | 93–87 | (Italy) Scavolini Pesaro |

- Final: April 18, 1991 at Palais Omnisports de Paris-Bercy in Paris, France.

| Team 1 | Score | Team 2 |
|---|---|---|
| FC Barcelona Banca Catalana (Spain) | 65–70 | (Socialist Federal Republic of Yugoslavia) POP 84 |

- Final four standings:

| Pos. | Team | Rec. |
|---|---|---|
| | (Socialist Federal Republic of Yugoslavia) POP 84 | 2–0 |
| Silver medal | (Spain) FC Barcelona Banca Catalana | 1–1 |
| Bronze medal | (Israel) Maccabi Elite Tel Aviv | 1–1 |
| 4th | (Italy) Scavolini Pesaro | 0–2 |

=== 1991–92 FIBA European League, 1st–tier ===
The 1991–92 FIBA European League was the 35th installment of the European top-tier level professional basketball club competition FIBA European League (now called EuroLeague), running from September 12, 1991, to April 16, 1992. The trophy was won by Partizan, who defeated Montigalà Joventut by a result of 71–70 at Abdi İpekçi Arena in Istanbul, Turkey. Overall, Slobodna Dalmacija achieved in the present competition a record of 7 wins against 7 defeats, in three successive rounds. (Note: Due to ongoing Yugoslav Wars, the three former Yugoslavian teams were forced to play all their home games outside their countries. All of them chose cities in Spain as the substitute home courts: eventual winner Partizan played in Fuenlabrada, title holder Slobodna Dalmacija in A Coruña and Cibona in Puerto Real.) More detailed:

==== First round ====
- Bye

==== Second round ====
- Bye

==== Top 16 ====
- Day 1 (October 31, 1991)

| Team 1 | Score | Team 2 |
|---|---|---|
| Knorr Bologna (Italy) | 85–80 | (Croatia) Slobodna Dalmacija |

- Day 2 (November 7, 1991)

| Team 1 | Score | Team 2 |
|---|---|---|
| Slobodna Dalmacija (Croatia) | 85–87 | (Israel) Maccabi Elite Tel Aviv |

- Day 3 (November 28, 1991)

| Team 1 | Score | Team 2 |
|---|---|---|
| Kalev (Estonia) | 88–95 | (Croatia) Slobodna Dalmacija |

- Day 4 (December 5, 1991)

| Team 1 | Score | Team 2 |
|---|---|---|
| Slobodna Dalmacija (Croatia) | 79–80 | (Spain) FC Barcelona Banca Catalana |

- Day 5 (December 12, 1991)

| Team 1 | Score | Team 2 |
|---|---|---|
| Phonola Caserta (Italy) | 95–107 | (Croatia) Slobodna Dalmacija |

- Day 6 (December 18, 1991)

| Team 1 | Score | Team 2 |
|---|---|---|
| Olympique Antibes (France) | 83–81 | (Croatia) Slobodna Dalmacija |

- Day 7 (January 9, 1992)

| Team 1 | Score | Team 2 |
|---|---|---|
| Slobodna Dalmacija (Croatia) | 96–89 | (Croatia) Cibona |

- Day 8 (January 16, 1992)

| Team 1 | Score | Team 2 |
|---|---|---|
| Slobodna Dalmacija (Croatia) | 99–95* | (Italy) Knorr Bologna |

^{*}Overtime at the end of regulation (89–89).

- Day 9 (January 23, 1992)

| Team 1 | Score | Team 2 |
|---|---|---|
| Maccabi Elite Tel Aviv (Israel) | 95–85 | (Croatia) Slobodna Dalmacija |

- Day 10 (January 30, 1992)

| Team 1 | Score | Team 2 |
|---|---|---|
| Slobodna Dalmacija (Croatia) | 89–86 | (Estonia) Kalev |

- Day 11 (February 6, 1992)

| Team 1 | Score | Team 2 |
|---|---|---|
| FC Barcelona Banca Catalana (Spain) | 110–94 | (Croatia) Slobodna Dalmacija |

- Day 12 (February 13, 1992)

| Team 1 | Score | Team 2 |
|---|---|---|
| Slobodna Dalmacija (Croatia) | 72–77 | (Italy) Phonola Caserta |

- Day 13 (February 19, 1992)

| Team 1 | Score | Team 2 |
|---|---|---|
| Slobodna Dalmacija (Croatia) | 92–90 | (France) Olympique Antibes |

- Day 14 (February 27, 1992)

| Team 1 | Score | Team 2 |
|---|---|---|
| Cibona (Croatia) | 110–117* | (Croatia) Slobodna Dalmacija |

^{*}Overtime at the end of regulation (102–102).

- Group A standings:

| Pos. | Team | Pld. | Pts. | W | L | PF | PA | PD | Tie-break |
|---|---|---|---|---|---|---|---|---|---|
| 1. | (Italy) Knorr Bologna | 14 | 24 | 10 | 4 | 1229 | 1148 | +81 | 3–1 |
| 2. | (Spain) FC Barcelona Banca Catalana | 14 | 24 | 10 | 4 | 1205 | 1129 | +76 | 2–2 |
| 3. | (Israel) Maccabi Elite Tel Aviv | 14 | 24 | 10 | 4 | 1311 | 1254 | +57 | 1–3 |
| 4. | (Croatia) Cibona | 14 | 23 | 9 | 5 | 1287 | 1232 | +55 | |
| 5. | (Croatia) Slobodna Dalmacija | 14 | 21 | 7 | 7 | 1271 | 1270 | +1 | |
| 6. | (France) Olympique Antibes | 14 | 18 | 4 | 10 | 1291 | 1385 | -94 | |
| 7. | (Estonia) Kalev | 14 | 17 | 3 | 11 | 1281 | 1354 | -73 | 2–0 |
| 8. | (Italy) Phonola Caserta | 14 | 14 | 3 | 11 | 1185 | 1288 | -103 | 0–2 |

=== 1992–93 FIBA European Cup, 2nd–tier ===
The 1992–93 FIBA European Cup was the 27th installment of FIBA's 2nd-tier level European-wide professional club basketball competition FIBA European Cup (lately called FIBA Saporta Cup), running from September 8, 1992, to March 16, 1993. The trophy was won by Sato Aris, who defeated Efes Pilsen by a result of 50–48 at Palasport Parco Ruffini in Turin, Italy. Overall, Slobodna Dalmacija achieved in the present competition a record of 8 wins against 4 defeats, in four successive rounds. More detailed:

==== First round ====
- Bye

==== Second round ====
- Tie played on October 7, 1992, and on October 8, 1992.

| Team 1 | Agg. | Team 2 | 1st leg | 2nd leg |
|---|---|---|---|---|
| Achilleas Kaimakli (Cyprus) | 160–172 | (Croatia) Slobodna Dalmacija | 90–86 | 70–86 |

==== Third round ====
- Bye

==== Top 12 ====
- Day 1 (November 24, 1992)

| Team 1 | Score | Team 2 |
|---|---|---|
| Slobodna Dalmacija (Croatia) | 87–73 | (Ukraine) Budivelnyk |

- Day 2 (December 1, 1992)

| Team 1 | Score | Team 2 |
|---|---|---|
| Benfica (Portugal) | 60–70 | (Croatia) Slobodna Dalmacija |

- Day 3 (December 8, 1992)

| Team 1 | Score | Team 2 |
|---|---|---|
| Slobodna Dalmacija (Croatia) | 77–70 | (Israel) Hapoel Galil Elyon |

- Day 4 (December 15, 1992)

| Team 1 | Score | Team 2 |
|---|---|---|
| Sato Aris (Greece) | 89–56 | (Croatia) Slobodna Dalmacija |

- Day 5 (January 5, 1993)

| Team 1 | Score | Team 2 |
|---|---|---|
| Slobodna Dalmacija (Croatia) | 71–62 | (France) Pitch Cholet |

- Day 6 (January 12, 1993)

| Team 1 | Score | Team 2 |
|---|---|---|
| Budivelnyk (Ukraine) | 47–77 | (Croatia) Slobodna Dalmacija |

- Day 7 (January 20, 1993)

| Team 1 | Score | Team 2 |
|---|---|---|
| Slobodna Dalmacija (Croatia) | 79–56 | (Portugal) Benfica |

- Day 8 (January 26, 1993)

| Team 1 | Score | Team 2 |
|---|---|---|
| Hapoel Galil Elyon (Israel) | 85–75 | (Croatia) Slobodna Dalmacija |

- Day 9 (February 2, 1993)

| Team 1 | Score | Team 2 |
|---|---|---|
| Slobodna Dalmacija (Croatia) | 66–76 | (Greece) Sato Aris |

- Day 10 (February 9, 1993)

| Team 1 | Score | Team 2 |
|---|---|---|
| Pitch Cholet (France) | 80–83 | (Croatia) Slobodna Dalmacija |

- Group B standings:

| Pos. | Team | Pld. | Pts. | W | L | PF | PA | PD | Tie-break |
|---|---|---|---|---|---|---|---|---|---|
| 1. | (Greece) Sato Aris | 10 | 19 | 9 | 1 | 815 | 689 | +126 | |
| 2. | (Israel) Hapoel Galil Elyon | 10 | 17 | 7 | 3 | 828 | 798 | +30 | 1–1 (+3) |
| 3. | (Croatia) Slobodna Dalmacija | 10 | 17 | 7 | 3 | 751 | 708 | +43 | 1–1 (-3) |
| 4. | (Portugal) Benfica | 10 | 14 | 4 | 6 | 768 | 770 | -2 | |
| 5. | (France) Pitch Cholet | 10 | 12 | 2 | 8 | 758 | 844 | -86 | |
| 6. | (Ukraine) Budivelnyk | 10 | 11 | 1 | 9 | 739 | 850 | -111 | |

=== 1993–94 FIBA European League, 1st–tier ===
The 1993–94 FIBA European League was the 37th installment of the European top-tier level professional club competition for basketball clubs (now called EuroLeague), running from September 9, 1993, to April 21, 1994. The trophy was won by 7up Joventut, who defeated Olympiacos by a result of 59–57 at Yad Eliyahu Arena in Tel Aviv, Israel. Overall, Croatia Osiguranje achieved in present competition a record of 3 wins against 1 defeat, in two successive rounds. More detailed:

==== First round ====
- Tie played on September 9, 1993, and on September 16, 1993.

| Team 1 | Agg. | Team 2 | 1st leg | 2nd leg |
|---|---|---|---|---|
| Kalev (Estonia) | 0–40* | Croatia Osiguranje | 0–20 | 0–20 |

^{*}Kalev withdrew before the first leg and Croatia Osiguranje received a forfeit (20-0) in both games.

==== Second round ====
- Tie played on September 30, 1993, and on October 7, 1993.

| Team 1 | Agg. | Team 2 | 1st leg | 2nd leg |
|---|---|---|---|---|
| Croatia Osiguranje | 132–146 | (Belgium) Maes Pils | 72–63 | 60–83 |

Eliminated teams of that round, (Note: Canoe Jeans EBBC, Croatia Osiguranje, USK Praha, Hapoel Galil Elyon, UKJ SÜBA St. Pölten, Žalgiris, Levski Sofia, Rabotnički, ASK Brocēni, Fidefinanz Bellinzona and Smelt Olimpija.) were given a wild card to participate in the third round of 1993–94 FIBA European Cup, the 2nd–tier level European-wide professional basketball club competition.

==== 1993–94 FIBA European Cup, 2nd–tier ====
The 1993–94 FIBA European Cup was the 28th installment of FIBA's 2nd-tier level European-wide professional club basketball competition FIBA European Cup (lately called FIBA Saporta Cup), running from September 7, 1993, to March 15, 1994. The trophy was won by Smelt Olimpija, who defeated Taugrés by a result of 91–81 at Centre Intercommunal de Glace Malley in Lausanne, Switzerland. Overall, Croatia Osiguranje achieved in the present competition a record of 8 wins against 3 defeats, in two successive rounds. More detailed:

===== Third round =====
- Tie played on October 26, 1993, and on November 2, 1993.

| Team 1 | Agg. | Team 2 | 1st leg | 2nd leg |
|---|---|---|---|---|
| Canoe Jeans EBBC (Netherlands) | 156–172 | Croatia Osiguranje | 62–78 | 94–94 |

===== Top 12 =====
- Day 1 (November 23, 1993)

| Team 1 | Score | Team 2 |
|---|---|---|
| Croatia Osiguranje | 75–74 | (Spain) Taugrés |

- Day 2 (December 1, 1993)

| Team 1 | Score | Team 2 |
|---|---|---|
| Rabotnički (North Macedonia) | 85–91 | Croatia Osiguranje |

- Day 3 (December 7, 1993)

| Team 1 | Score | Team 2 |
|---|---|---|
| Croatia Osiguranje | 95–65 | (Switzerland) Fidefinanz Bellinzona |

- Day 4 (December 14, 1993)

| Team 1 | Score | Team 2 |
|---|---|---|
| Tofaş (Turkey) | 99–95 | Croatia Osiguranje |

- Day 5 (January 5, 1994)

| Team 1 | Score | Team 2 |
|---|---|---|
| Croatia Osiguranje | 79–84 | (Slovenia) Smelt Olimpija |

- Day 6 (January 11, 1994)

| Team 1 | Score | Team 2 |
|---|---|---|
| Taugrés (Spain) | 91–86 | Croatia Osiguranje |

- Day 7 (January 19, 1994)

| Team 1 | Score | Team 2 |
|---|---|---|
| Croatia Osiguranje | 82–74 | (North Macedonia) Rabotnički |

- Day 8 (January 25, 1994)

| Team 1 | Score | Team 2 |
|---|---|---|
| Fidefinanz Bellinzona (Switzerland) | 71–89 | Croatia Osiguranje |

- Day 9 (February 1, 1994)

| Team 1 | Score | Team 2 |
|---|---|---|
| Croatia Osiguranje | 93–77 | (Turkey) Tofaş |

- Day 10 (February 9, 1994)

| Team 1 | Score | Team 2 |
|---|---|---|
| Smelt Olimpija (Slovenia) | 68–76 | Croatia Osiguranje |

- Group A standings:

| Pos. | Team | Pld. | Pts. | W | L | PF | PA | PD | Tie-break |
|---|---|---|---|---|---|---|---|---|---|
| 1. | (Slovenia) Smelt Olimpija | 10 | 18 | 8 | 2 | 790 | 718 | +68 | |
| 2. | (Spain) Taugrés | 10 | 17 | 7 | 3 | 865 | 791 | +74 | 1–1 (+4) |
| 3. | Croatia Osiguranje | 10 | 17 | 7 | 3 | 861 | 788 | +73 | 1–1 (-4) |
| 4. | (Switzerland) Fidefinanz Bellinzona | 10 | 14 | 4 | 6 | 699 | 759 | -60 | |
| 5. | (Turkey) Tofaş | 10 | 12 | 2 | 8 | 841 | 920 | -79 | |
| 6. | (North Macedonia) Rabotnički | 10 | 12 | 2 | 8 | 852 | 932 | -80 | |

=== 1994–95 FIBA European League, 1st–tier ===
The 1994–95 FIBA European League was the 38th installment of the European top-tier level professional club competition for basketball clubs (now called EuroLeague), running from September 8, 1994, to April 13, 1995. The trophy was won by Real Madrid Teka, who defeated Olympiacos by a result of 73–61 at Pabellón Príncipe Felipe in Zaragoza, Spain. Overall, Croatia Osiguranje achieved in present competition a record of 3 wins against 1 defeat, in two successive rounds. More detailed:

==== First round ====
- Tie played on September 8, 1994, and on September 9, 1994.

| Team 1 | Agg. | Team 2 | 1st leg | 2nd leg |
|---|---|---|---|---|
| Sloboda Dita (Bosnia and Herzegovina) | 124–180 | Croatia Osiguranje | 68–99 | 56–81 |

==== Second round ====
- Tie played on September 29, 1994, and on October 4, 1994.

| Team 1 | Agg. | Team 2 | 1st leg | 2nd leg |
|---|---|---|---|---|
| Croatia Osiguranje | 142–155 | (Germany) Bayer 04 Leverkusen | 73–65 | 69–90 |

Eliminated teams of that round, (Note: Thames Valley Tigers, Croatia Osiguranje, Budivelnyk, Žalgiris, Olympique Antibes, Bioveta Brno, Hapoel Tel Aviv, Danone Honvéd, Maes Flandria, Fidefinanz Bellinzona, Kärcher Hisings-Kärra, Pezoporikos Larnaca, ASK Brocēni and Baník Cígeľ Prievidza.) were given a wild card to participate in the third round of 1994–95 FIBA European Cup, the 2nd–tier level European-wide professional basketball club competition.

==== 1994–95 FIBA European Cup, 2nd–tier ====
The 1994–95 FIBA European Cup was the 29th installment of FIBA's 2nd-tier level European-wide professional club basketball competition FIBA European Cup (lately called FIBA Saporta Cup), running from September 6, 1994, to March 14, 1995. The trophy was won by Benetton Treviso, who defeated Taugrés by a result of 94–86 at Abdi İpekçi Arena in Istanbul, Turkey. Overall, Croatia Osiguranje achieved in the present competition a record of 6 wins against 6 defeats, in two successive rounds. More detailed:

===== Third round =====
- Tie played on October 26, 1994, and on November 2, 1994.

| Team 1 | Agg. | Team 2 | 1st leg | 2nd leg |
|---|---|---|---|---|
| Thames Valley Tigers (England) | 146–148 | Croatia Osiguranje | 77–72 | 69–76 |

===== Top 12 =====
- Day 1 (November 23, 1994)

| Team 1 | Score | Team 2 |
|---|---|---|
| Croatia Osiguranje | 68–57 | (Switzerland) Fidefinanz Bellinzona |

- Day 2 (November 29, 1994)

| Team 1 | Score | Team 2 |
|---|---|---|
| Croatia Osiguranje | 70–65 | (Belgium) Maes Flandria |

- Day 3 (December 6, 1994)

| Team 1 | Score | Team 2 |
|---|---|---|
| Iraklis Aspis Pronoia (Greece) | 75–70 | Croatia Osiguranje |

- Day 4 (December 13, 1994)

| Team 1 | Score | Team 2 |
|---|---|---|
| Olympique Antibes (France) | 86–78 | Croatia Osiguranje |

- Day 5 (January 3, 1995)

| Team 1 | Score | Team 2 |
|---|---|---|
| Croatia Osiguranje | 101–74 | (Ukraine) Kyiv |

- Day 6 (January 10, 1995)

| Team 1 | Score | Team 2 |
|---|---|---|
| Fidefinanz Bellinzona (Switzerland) | 60–69 | Croatia Osiguranje |

- Day 7 (January 18, 1995)

| Team 1 | Score | Team 2 |
|---|---|---|
| Maes Flandria (Belgium) | 65–84 | Croatia Osiguranje |

- Day 8 (January 24, 1995)

| Team 1 | Score | Team 2 |
|---|---|---|
| Croatia Osiguranje | 63–71 | (Greece) Iraklis Aspis Pronoia |

- Day 9 (January 31, 1995)

| Team 1 | Score | Team 2 |
|---|---|---|
| Croatia Osiguranje | 77–83 | (France) Olympique Antibes |

- Day 10 (February 7, 1995)

| Team 1 | Score | Team 2 |
|---|---|---|
| Kyiv (Ukraine) | 95–86 | Croatia Osiguranje |

- Group A standings:

| Pos. | Team | Pld. | Pts. | W | L | PF | PA | PD | Tie-break |
|---|---|---|---|---|---|---|---|---|---|
| 1. | (France) Olympique Antibes | 10 | 19 | 9 | 1 | 857 | 752 | +105 | 1–1 (+7) |
| 2. | (Greece) Iraklis Aspis Pronoia | 10 | 19 | 9 | 1 | 809 | 715 | +93 | 1–1 (-7) |
| 3. | Croatia Osiguranje | 10 | 15 | 5 | 5 | 766 | 731 | +35 | |
| 4. | (Belgium) Maes Flandria | 10 | 14 | 4 | 6 | 805 | 807 | -2 | |
| 5. | (Ukraine) Kyiv | 10 | 12 | 2 | 8 | 817 | 934 | -117 | |
| 6. | (Switzerland) Fidefinanz Bellinzona | 10 | 11 | 1 | 9 | 669 | 784 | -125 | |

=== 1995–96 FIBA Korać Cup, 3rd–tier ===
The 1995–96 FIBA Korać Cup was the 25th installment of the European 3rd-tier level professional basketball club competition FIBA Korać Cup, running from September 6, 1995, to March 13, 1996. The trophy was won by Efes Pilsen, who defeated Stefanel Milano by a result of 146–145 in a two-legged final on a home and away basis. Overall, Croatia Osiguranje achieved in present competition a record of 4 wins against 2 defeats, in three successive rounds. More detailed:

==== First round ====
- Tie played on September 6, 1995, and on September 13, 1995.

| Team 1 | Agg. | Team 2 | 1st leg | 2nd leg |
|---|---|---|---|---|
| Bosna (Bosnia and Herzegovina) | 0–40* | Croatia Osiguranje | 0–20 | 0–20 |

^{*}Bosna withdrew before the first leg and Croatia Osiguranje received a forfeit (20-0) in both games.

==== Second round ====
- Tie played on September 28, 1995, and on October 3, 1995.

| Team 1 | Agg. | Team 2 | 1st leg | 2nd leg |
|---|---|---|---|---|
| Žito Vardar (North Macedonia) | 123–149 | Croatia Osiguranje | 57–67 | 66–82 |

==== Third round ====
- Tie played on October 25, 1995, and on November 1, 1995.

| Team 1 | Agg. | Team 2 | 1st leg | 2nd leg |
|---|---|---|---|---|
| Croatia Osiguranje | 115–132 | (Italy) Cagiva Varese | 54–60 | 61–72 |

=== 1996–97 FIBA EuroLeague, 1st–tier ===
The 1996–97 FIBA EuroLeague was the 40th installment of the European top-tier level professional club competition for basketball clubs (now called simply EuroLeague), running from September 19, 1996, to April 24, 1997. The trophy was won by Olympiacos, who defeated FC Barcelona Banca Catalana by a result of 73–58 at PalaEUR in Rome, Italy. Overall, Croatia Osiguranje achieved in present competition a record of 7 wins against 9 defeats, in two successive rounds. More detailed:

==== First round ====
- Day 1 (September 18, 1996)

| Team 1 | Score | Team 2 |
|---|---|---|
| Croatia Osiguranje | 65–75 | (Spain) FC Barcelona Banca Catalana |

- Day 2 (September 26, 1996)

| Team 1 | Score | Team 2 |
|---|---|---|
| Croatia Osiguranje | 73–61 | (France) ASVEL |

- Day 3 (October 3, 1996)

| Team 1 | Score | Team 2 |
|---|---|---|
| Bayer 04 Leverkusen (Germany) | 60–63 | Croatia Osiguranje |

- Day 4 (October 9, 1996)

| Team 1 | Score | Team 2 |
|---|---|---|
| Panathinaikos (Greece) | 72–50 | Croatia Osiguranje |

- Day 5 (October 17, 1996)

| Team 1 | Score | Team 2 |
|---|---|---|
| Croatia Osiguranje | 53–66 | (Slovenia) Smelt Olimpija |

- Day 6 (November 6, 1996)

| Team 1 | Score | Team 2 |
|---|---|---|
| FC Barcelona Banca Catalana (Spain) | 68–70 | Croatia Osiguranje |

- Day 7 (November 14, 1996)

| Team 1 | Score | Team 2 |
|---|---|---|
| ASVEL (France) | 78–59 | Croatia Osiguranje |

- Day 8 (November 21, 1996)

| Team 1 | Score | Team 2 |
|---|---|---|
| Croatia Osiguranje | 86–79 | (Germany) Bayer 04 Leverkusen |

- Day 9 (December 4, 1996)

| Team 1 | Score | Team 2 |
|---|---|---|
| Croatia Osiguranje | 58–65 | (Greece) Panathinaikos |

- Day 10 (December 11, 1996)

| Team 1 | Score | Team 2 |
|---|---|---|
| Smelt Olimpija (Slovenia) | 81–53 | Croatia Osiguranje |

- Group C standings:

| Pos. | Team | Pld. | Pts. | W | L | PF | PA | PD | Tie-break |
|---|---|---|---|---|---|---|---|---|---|
| 1. | (Greece) Panathinaïkos | 10 | 18 | 8 | 2 | 736 | 693 | +43 | |
| 2. | (Slovenia) Smelt Olimpija | 10 | 17 | 7 | 3 | 753 | 669 | +84 | 1–1 (+12) |
| 3. | (France) ASVEL | 10 | 17 | 7 | 3 | 738 | 718 | +20 | 1–1 (-12) |
| 4. | (Spain) FC Barcelona Banca Catalana | 10 | 14 | 4 | 6 | 767 | 734 | +33 | 1–1 (+8) |
| 5. | Croatia Osiguranje | 10 | 14 | 4 | 6 | 630 | 705 | -75 | 1–1 (-8) |
| 6. | (Germany) Bayer 04 Leverkusen | 10 | 10 | 0 | 10 | 704 | 809 | -105 | |

==== Second round ====
- Day 1 (January 9, 1997)

| Team 1 | Score | Team 2 |
|---|---|---|
| Croatia Osiguranje | 76–75 | (Federal Republic of Yugoslavia) Partizan |

- Day 2 (January 15, 1997)

| Team 1 | Score | Team 2 |
|---|---|---|
| Efes Pilsen (Turkey) | 74–64 | Croatia Osiguranje |

- Day 3 (January 23, 1997)

| Team 1 | Score | Team 2 |
|---|---|---|
| Croatia Osiguranje | 68–70 | (Italy) Kinder Bologna |

- Day 4 (February 6, 1997)

| Team 1 | Score | Team 2 |
|---|---|---|
| Partizan (Federal Republic of Yugoslavia) | 71–82 | Croatia Osiguranje |

- Day 5 (February 12, 1997)

| Team 1 | Score | Team 2 |
|---|---|---|
| Croatia Osiguranje | 78–56 | (Turkey) Efes Pilsen |

- Day 6 (February 20, 1997)

| Team 1 | Score | Team 2 |
|---|---|---|
| Kinder Bologna (Italy) | 73–57 | Croatia Osiguranje |

- Group H standings:

| Pos. | Team | Pld. | Pts. | W | L | PF | PA | PD | Tie-break |
|---|---|---|---|---|---|---|---|---|---|
| 1. | (Turkey) Efes Pilsen | 16 | 28 | 12 | 4 | 1250 | 1156 | +94 | |
| 2. | (Federal Republic of Yugoslavia) Partizan | 16 | 25 | 9 | 7 | 1257 | 1228 | +29 | |
| 3. | (Spain) FC Barcelona Banca Catalana | 16 | 24 | 8 | 8 | 1244 | 1225 | +19 | |
| 4. | (Italy) Kinder Bologna | 16 | 23 | 7 | 9 | 1274 | 1259 | +15 | 2–0 |
| 5. | Croatia Osiguranje | 16 | 23 | 7 | 9 | 1055 | 1124 | -69 | 0–2 |
| 6. | (Germany) Bayer 04 Leverkusen | 16 | 18 | 2 | 14 | 1175 | 1312 | -137 | |

=== 1997–98 FIBA EuroLeague, 1st–tier ===
The 1997–98 FIBA EuroLeague was the 41st installment of the European top-tier level professional club competition for basketball clubs (now called simply EuroLeague), running from September 18, 1997, to April 23, 1998. The trophy was won by Kinder Bologna, who defeated AEK by a result of 58–44 at Palau Sant Jordi in Barcelona, Spain. Overall, Split achieved in present competition a record of 5 wins against 13 defeats, in three successive rounds. More detailed:

==== First round ====
- Day 1 (September 17, 1997)

| Team 1 | Score | Team 2 |
|---|---|---|
| Split (Croatia) | 72–56 | (Turkey) Türk Telekom PTT |

- Day 2 (September 25, 1997)

| Team 1 | Score | Team 2 |
|---|---|---|
| Split (Croatia) | 74–76 | (Greece) PAOK |

- Day 3 (October 2, 1997)

| Team 1 | Score | Team 2 |
|---|---|---|
| FC Porto (Portugal) | 79–83 | (Croatia) Split |

- Day 4 (October 8, 1997)

| Team 1 | Score | Team 2 |
|---|---|---|
| Estudiantes (Spain) | 77–73 | (Croatia) Split |

- Day 5 (October 23, 1997)

| Team 1 | Score | Team 2 |
|---|---|---|
| Split (Croatia) | 72–77 | (Italy) Benetton Treviso |

- Day 6 (November 5, 1997)

| Team 1 | Score | Team 2 |
|---|---|---|
| Türk Telekom PTT (Turkey) | 78–69 | (Croatia) Split |

- Day 7 (November 12, 1997)

| Team 1 | Score | Team 2 |
|---|---|---|
| PAOK (Greece) | 89–60 | (Croatia) Split |

- Day 8 (November 19, 1997)

| Team 1 | Score | Team 2 |
|---|---|---|
| Split (Croatia) | 88–82 | (Portugal) FC Porto |

- Day 9 (December 10, 1997)

| Team 1 | Score | Team 2 |
|---|---|---|
| Split (Croatia) | 86–69 | (Spain) Estudiantes |

- Day 10 (December 18, 1997)

| Team 1 | Score | Team 2 |
|---|---|---|
| Benetton Treviso (Italy) | 85–70 | (Croatia) Split |

- Group B standings:

| Pos. | Team | Pld. | Pts. | W | L | PF | PA | PD | Tie-break |
|---|---|---|---|---|---|---|---|---|---|
| 1. | (Italy) Benetton Treviso | 10 | 19 | 9 | 1 | 782 | 664 | +118 | |
| 2. | (Spain) Estudiantes | 10 | 16 | 6 | 4 | 753 | 747 | +6 | 2–0 |
| 3. | (Greece) PAOK | 10 | 16 | 6 | 4 | 729 | 672 | +57 | 0–2 |
| 4. | (Turkey) Türk Telekom PTT | 10 | 15 | 5 | 5 | 711 | 716 | -5 | |
| 5. | (Croatia) Split | 10 | 14 | 4 | 6 | 747 | 768 | -21 | |
| 6. | (Portugal) FC Porto | 10 | 10 | 0 | 10 | 688 | 843 | -155 | |

==== Second round ====
- Day 1 (January 8, 1998)

| Team 1 | Score | Team 2 |
|---|---|---|
| Split (Croatia) | 82–93 | (Turkey) Efes Pilsen |

- Day 2 (January 15, 1998)

| Team 1 | Score | Team 2 |
|---|---|---|
| Olympiacos (Greece) | 90–79 | (Croatia) Split |

- Day 3 (January 22, 1998)

| Team 1 | Score | Team 2 |
|---|---|---|
| Split (Croatia) | 73–75 | (Israel) Maccabi Elite Tel Aviv |

- Day 4 (February 4, 1998)

| Team 1 | Score | Team 2 |
|---|---|---|
| Efes Pilsen (Turkey) | 86–75 | (Croatia) Split |

- Day 5 (February 12, 1998)

| Team 1 | Score | Team 2 |
|---|---|---|
| Split (Croatia) | 60–53 | (Greece) Olympiacos |

- Day 6 (February 19, 1998)

| Team 1 | Score | Team 2 |
|---|---|---|
| Maccabi Elite Tel Aviv (Israel) | 78–69 | (Croatia) Split |

- Group E standings:

| Pos. | Team | Pld. | Pts. | W | L | PF | PA | PD | Tie-break |
|---|---|---|---|---|---|---|---|---|---|
| 1. | (Greece) Olympiacos | 16 | 28 | 12 | 4 | 1176 | 1098 | +78 | 2–0 |
| 2. | (Turkey) Efes Pilsen | 16 | 28 | 12 | 4 | 1232 | 1106 | +126 | 0–2 |
| 3. | (Israel) Maccabi Elite Tel Aviv | 16 | 27 | 11 | 5 | 1236 | 1152 | +84 | |
| 4. | (Croatia) Split | 16 | 21 | 5 | 11 | 1185 | 1243 | -58 | 1–1 (+7) |
| 5. | (Turkey) Türk Telekom PTT | 16 | 21 | 5 | 11 | 1131 | 1185 | -54 | 1–1 (-7) |
| 6. | (Portugal) FC Porto | 16 | 16 | 0 | 16 | 1071 | 1356 | -285 | |

==== Top 16 ====
- Best-of-3 playoff: Game 1 away on March 3, 1998 / Game 2 at home on March 5, 1998.

| Team 1 | Agg. | Team 2 | 1st leg | 2nd leg | 3rd leg |
|---|---|---|---|---|---|
| AEK (Greece) | 2–0 | (Croatia) Split | 76–46 | 62–54 | – – – |

=== 1998–99 FIBA Saporta Cup, 2nd–tier ===
The 1998–99 FIBA Saporta Cup was the 33rd installment of FIBA's 2nd-tier level European-wide professional club basketball competition FIBA Saporta Cup, running from September 22, 1998, to April 13, 1999. The trophy was won by Benetton Treviso, who defeated Pamesa Valencia by a result of 64–60 at Pabellón Príncipe Felipe in Zaragoza, Spain. Overall, Split achieved in the present competition a record of 7 wins against 7 defeats, in three successive rounds. More detailed:

==== First round ====
- Day 1 (September 22, 1998)

| Team 1 | Score | Team 2 |
|---|---|---|
| Cholet (France) | 84–57 | (Croatia) Split |

- Day 2 (September 29, 1998)

| Team 1 | Score | Team 2 |
|---|---|---|
| Split (Croatia) | 85–74 | (North Macedonia) MZT Boss Skopje |

- Day 3 (October 6, 1998)

| Team 1 | Score | Team 2 |
|---|---|---|
| Mlékárna Kunín (Czech Republic) | 71–113 | (Croatia) Split |

- Day 4 (October 13, 1998)

| Team 1 | Score | Team 2 |
|---|---|---|
| Split (Croatia) | 68–77 | (Turkey) Türk Telekom PTT |

- Day 5 (October 20, 1998)

| Team 1 | Score | Team 2 |
|---|---|---|
| Split (Croatia) | 92–83 | (Slovakia) Slovakofarma Pezinok |

- Day 6 (November 3, 1998)

| Team 1 | Score | Team 2 |
|---|---|---|
| Split (Croatia) | 63–76 | (France) Cholet |

- Day 7 (November 10, 1998)

| Team 1 | Score | Team 2 |
|---|---|---|
| MZT Boss Skopje (North Macedonia) | 71–69 | (Croatia) Split |

- Day 8 (November 17, 1998)

| Team 1 | Score | Team 2 |
|---|---|---|
| Split (Croatia) | 97–70 | (Czech Republic) Mlékárna Kunín |

- Day 9 (December 8, 1998)

| Team 1 | Score | Team 2 |
|---|---|---|
| Türk Telekom PTT (Turkey) | 75–74 | (Croatia) Split |

- Day 10 (December 15, 1998)

| Team 1 | Score | Team 2 |
|---|---|---|
| Slovakofarma Pezinok (Slovakia) | 79–82 | (Croatia) Split |

- Group B standings:

| Pos. | Team | Pld. | Pts. | W | L | PF | PA | PD | Tie-break |
|---|---|---|---|---|---|---|---|---|---|
| 1. | (France) Cholet | 10 | 18 | 8 | 2 | 815 | 675 | +140 | |
| 2. | (Turkey) Türk Telekom | 10 | 17 | 7 | 3 | 768 | 722 | +93 | |
| 3. | (Croatia) Split | 10 | 15 | 5 | 5 | 800 | 760 | +40 | 2–0 |
| 4. | (Slovakia) Slovakofarma Pezinok | 10 | 15 | 5 | 5 | 759 | 771 | -12 | 0–2 |
| 5. | (North Macedonia) MZT Boss Skopje | 10 | 13 | 3 | 7 | 738 | 805 | -67 | |
| 6. | (Czech Republic) Mlékárna Kunín | 10 | 12 | 2 | 8 | 755 | 902 | -147 | |

==== Second round ====
- Tie played on January 12, 1999, and on January 19, 1999.

| Team 1 | Agg. | Team 2 | 1st leg | 2nd leg |
|---|---|---|---|---|
| Split (Croatia) | 152-139 | (Estonia) Kalev | 83–77 | 69–62 |

==== Top 16 ====
- Tie played on February 9, 1999, and on February 16, 1999.

| Team 1 | Agg. | Team 2 | 1st leg | 2nd leg |
|---|---|---|---|---|
| Split (Croatia) | 151-163 | (Spain) Pamesa Valencia | 76–79 | 75–84 |

== 2000s ==
=== 1999–2000 FIBA Saporta Cup, 2nd–tier ===
The 1999–2000 FIBA Saporta Cup was the 34th installment of FIBA's 2nd-tier level European-wide professional club basketball competition FIBA Saporta Cup, running from September 21, 1999, to April 11, 2000. The trophy was won by AEK, who defeated Kinder Bologna by a result of 83–76 at Centre Intercommunal de Glace de Malley in Lausanne, Switzerland. Overall, Split CO achieved in the present competition a record of 8 wins against 6 defeats, in three successive rounds. More detailed:

==== First round ====
- Day 1 (September 21, 1999)

| Team 1 | Score | Team 2 |
|---|---|---|
| London Towers (England) | 84–88 | (Croatia) Split CO |

- Day 2 (September 28, 1999)

| Team 1 | Score | Team 2 |
|---|---|---|
| Split CO (Croatia) | 75–76 | (Turkey) Darüşşafaka |

- Day 3 (October 5, 1999)

| Team 1 | Score | Team 2 |
|---|---|---|
| Okapi Aalst (Belgium) | 60–71 | (Croatia) Split CO |

- Day 4 (October 13, 1999)

| Team 1 | Score | Team 2 |
|---|---|---|
| Split CO (Croatia) | 104–82 | (Sweden) Plannja |

- Day 5 (October 19, 1999)

| Team 1 | Score | Team 2 |
|---|---|---|
| Split CO (Croatia) | 77–66 | (Italy) Adecco Milano |

- Day 6 (November 2, 1999)

| Team 1 | Score | Team 2 |
|---|---|---|
| Split CO (Croatia) | 82–81 | (England) London Towers |

- Day 7 (November 9, 1999)

| Team 1 | Score | Team 2 |
|---|---|---|
| Darüşşafaka (Turkey) | 81–65 | (Croatia) Split CO |

- Day 8 (November 17, 1999)

| Team 1 | Score | Team 2 |
|---|---|---|
| Split CO (Croatia) | 78–82 | (Belgium) Okapi Aalst |

- Day 9 (December 7, 1999)

| Team 1 | Score | Team 2 |
|---|---|---|
| Plannja (Sweden) | 89–63 | (Croatia) Split CO |

- Day 10 (December 14, 1999)

| Team 1 | Score | Team 2 |
|---|---|---|
| Adecco Milano (Italy) | 72–84 | (Croatia) Split CO |

- Group G standings:

| Pos. | Team | Pld. | Pts. | W | L | PF | PA | PD | Tie-break |
|---|---|---|---|---|---|---|---|---|---|
| 1. | (Turkey) Darüşşafaka | 10 | 18 | 8 | 2 | 825 | 759 | +66 | |
| 2. | (Croatia) Split CO | 10 | 16 | 6 | 4 | 787 | 773 | +14 | |
| 3. | (Sweden) Plannja | 10 | 15 | 5 | 5 | 753 | 772 | -19 | |
| 4. | (Italy) Adecco Milano | 10 | 14 | 4 | 6 | 749 | 719 | +30 | 2–0 |
| 5. | (Belgium) Okapi Aalst | 10 | 14 | 4 | 6 | 789 | 831 | -42 | 0–2 |
| 6. | (England) London Towers | 10 | 13 | 3 | 7 | 789 | 838 | -49 | |

==== Second round ====
- Tie played on January 11, 2000, and on January 19, 2000.

| Team 1 | Agg. | Team 2 | 1st leg | 2nd leg |
|---|---|---|---|---|
| Sakalai (Lithuania) | 166–186 | (Croatia) Split CO | 86–97 | 80–89 |

==== Top 16 ====
- Tie played on February 8, 2000, and on February 15, 2000.

| Team 1 | Agg. | Team 2 | 1st leg | 2nd leg |
|---|---|---|---|---|
| Split CO (Croatia) | 129–150 | (Greece) Hercules | 63–71 | 66–79 |

=== 2000–01 FIBA SuproLeague, 1st–tier ===
The 2000–01 FIBA SuproLeague was the FIBA European professional club basketball Champions' Cup for the 2000–01 season, running from October 19, 2000, to May 13, 2001. Up until that season, there was one cup, the FIBA European Champions' Cup (which is now called the EuroLeague), though in this season of 2000–01, the leading European teams split into two competitions: the FIBA SuproLeague and Euroleague Basketball Company's Euroleague 2000–01. The trophy was won by Maccabi Elite Tel Aviv, who defeated Panathinaikos by a result of 81–67 at Palais Omnisports de Paris-Bercy in Paris, France. Overall, Split CO achieved in the present competition a record of 15 wins against 8 defeats, in three successive rounds. More detailed:

==== Regular season ====
- Day 1 (October 18, 2000)

| Team 1 | Score | Team 2 |
|---|---|---|
| Ülker (Turkey) | 80–69 | (Croatia) Split CO |

- Day 2 (October 26, 2000)

| Team 1 | Score | Team 2 |
|---|---|---|
| Split CO (Croatia) | 68–59 | (Greece) Panathinaikos |

- Day 3 (November 1, 2000)

| Team 1 | Score | Team 2 |
|---|---|---|
| Split CO (Croatia) | 77–73 | (Germany) Alba Berlin |

- Day 4 (November 9, 2000)

| Team 1 | Score | Team 2 |
|---|---|---|
| Split CO (Croatia) | 83–88* | (Poland) Śląsk Wrocław |

^{*}Overtime at the end of regulation (74–74).

- Day 5 (November 15, 2000)

| Team 1 | Score | Team 2 |
|---|---|---|
| Maccabi Ness Ra'anana (Israel) | 77–84 | (Croatia) Split CO |

- Day 6 (December 7, 2000)

| Team 1 | Score | Team 2 |
|---|---|---|
| Split CO (Croatia) | 81–61 | (Italy) Montepaschi Siena |

- Day 7 (December 13, 2000)

| Team 1 | Score | Team 2 |
|---|---|---|
| ASVEL (France) | 88–78 | (Croatia) Split CO |

- Day 8 (December 21, 2000)

| Team 1 | Score | Team 2 |
|---|---|---|
| Split CO (Croatia) | 83–80 | (Lithuania) Lietuvos rytas |

- Day 9 (January 4, 2001)

| Team 1 | Score | Team 2 |
|---|---|---|
| CSKA Moscow (Russia) | 66–57 | (Croatia) Split CO |

- Day 10 (January 11, 2001)

| Team 1 | Score | Team 2 |
|---|---|---|
| Split CO (Croatia) | 76–70 | (Turkey) Ülker |

- Day 11 (January 18, 2001)

| Team 1 | Score | Team 2 |
|---|---|---|
| Panathinaikos (Greece) | 64–60 | (Croatia) Split CO |

- Day 12 (February 1, 2001)

| Team 1 | Score | Team 2 |
|---|---|---|
| Alba Berlin (Germany) | 73–79 | (Croatia) Split CO |

- Day 13 (February 8, 2001)

| Team 1 | Score | Team 2 |
|---|---|---|
| Śląsk Wrocław (Poland) | 72–75 | (Croatia) Split CO |

- Day 14 (February 14, 2001)

| Team 1 | Score | Team 2 |
|---|---|---|
| Split CO (Croatia) | 76–65 | (Israel) Maccabi Ness Ra'anana |

- Day 15 (February 22, 2001)

| Team 1 | Score | Team 2 |
|---|---|---|
| Montepaschi Siena (Italy) | 76–81 | (Croatia) Split CO |

- Day 16 (February 28, 2001)

| Team 1 | Score | Team 2 |
|---|---|---|
| Split CO (Croatia) | 84–78 | (France) ASVEL |

- Day 17 (March 8, 2001)

| Team 1 | Score | Team 2 |
|---|---|---|
| Lietuvos rytas (Lithuania) | 93–77 | (Croatia) Split CO |

- Day 18 (March 15, 2001)

| Team 1 | Score | Team 2 |
|---|---|---|
| Split CO (Croatia) | 75–72 | (Russia) CSKA Moscow |

- Group A standings:

| Pos. | Team | Pld. | Pts. | W | L | PF | PA | PD | Tie-break |
|---|---|---|---|---|---|---|---|---|---|
| 1. | (Greece) Panathinaikos | 18 | 31 | 13 | 5 | 1477 | 1364 | +113 | |
| 2. | (Russia) CSKA Moscow | 18 | 30 | 12 | 6 | 1429 | 1376 | +53 | 1–1 (+6) |
| 3. | (Croatia) Split CO | 18 | 30 | 12 | 6 | 1363 | 1335 | +28 | 1–1 (-6) |
| 4. | (Turkey) Ülker | 18 | 29 | 11 | 7 | 1481 | 1419 | +62 | |
| 5. | (Germany) Alba Berlin | 18 | 27 | 9 | 9 | 1439 | 1408 | +31 | 1–1 (+3) |
| 6. | (France) ASVEL | 18 | 27 | 9 | 9 | 1413 | 1400 | +13 | 1–1 (-3) |
| 7. | (Lithuania) Lietuvos rytas | 18 | 25 | 7 | 11 | 1522 | 1536 | -14 | 1–1 (+8) |
| 8. | (Poland) Śląsk Wrocław | 18 | 25 | 7 | 11 | 1432 | 1446 | -14 | 1–1 (-8) |
| 9. | (Italy) Montepaschi Siena | 18 | 24 | 6 | 12 | 1406 | 1495 | -89 | |
| 10. | (Israel) Maccabi Ness Ra'anana | 18 | 22 | 4 | 14 | 1294 | 1477 | -183 | |

==== Top 16 ====
- Best-of-3 playoff: Game 1 at home on March 27, 2001 / Game 2 away on March 29, 2001.

| Team 1 | Agg. | Team 2 | 1st leg | 2nd leg | 3rd leg |
|---|---|---|---|---|---|
| Split CO (Croatia) | 2–0 | (France) Pau-Orthez | 79–78 | 85–83 | – – – |

==== Quarterfinals ====
- Best-of-3 playoff: Game 1 away on April 17, 2001 / Game 2 at home on April 19, 2001 / Game 3 away on April 26, 2001.

| Team 1 | Agg. | Team 2 | 1st leg | 2nd leg | 3rd leg |
|---|---|---|---|---|---|
| Efes Pilsen (Turkey) | 2–1 | (Croatia) Split CO | 95–69 | 64–72 | 82–59 |

=== 2001–02 Euroleague, 1st–tier ===
The 2001–02 Euroleague was the 2nd season of the EuroLeague, under the newly formed Euroleague Basketball Company's authority, and it was the 45th installment of the European top-tier level professional club competition for basketball clubs, running from October 10, 2001, to May 5, 2002. The trophy was won by Panathinaikos, who defeated the title holder Kinder Bologna by a result of 89–83 at PalaMalaguti in Bologna, Italy. Overall, Split CO achieved in present competition a record of 1 win against 3 defeats, in two successive rounds. More detailed:

==== First qualifying round ====
- Tie played on September 13, 2001, and on September 16, 2001.

| Team 1 | Agg. | Team 2 | 1st leg | 2nd leg |
|---|---|---|---|---|
| Lietuvos rytas (Lithuania) | 158–159 | (Croatia) Split CO | 87–71 | 71–88 |

==== Second qualifying round ====
- Tie played on September 20, 2001, and on September 23, 2001.

| Team 1 | Agg. | Team 2 | 1st leg | 2nd leg |
|---|---|---|---|---|
| Telekom Baskets Bonn (Germany) | 166–159 | (Croatia) Split CO | 76–73 | 90–86 |

The seven eliminated teams of the three qualifying rounds, (Note: Hapoel Jerusalem, Telekom Baskets Bonn, Le Mans Sarthe, Split CO, Portugal Telecom, Lietuvos rytas and Darüşşafaka.) were given a wild card to participate in the regular season of 2001–02 FIBA Saporta Cup, the 2nd–tier level European-wide professional basketball club competition.

==== 2001–02 FIBA Saporta Cup, 2nd–tier ====
The 2001–02 FIBA Saporta Cup was the 36th installment of FIBA's 2nd-tier level European-wide professional club basketball competition FIBA Saporta Cup, running from October 30, 2001, to April 30, 2002. The trophy was won by Montepaschi Siena, who defeated Pamesa Valencia by a result of 81–71 at Palais des Sports de Gerland in Lyon, France. Overall, Split CO achieved in the present competition a record of 5 wins against 7 defeats, in two successive rounds. More detailed:

==== Regular season ====
- Day 1 (October 30, 2001)

| Team 1 | Score | Team 2 |
|---|---|---|
| Split CO (Croatia) | 82–84 | (Bosnia and Herzegovina) Igokea |

- Day 2 (November 6, 2001)

| Team 1 | Score | Team 2 |
|---|---|---|
| Iraklis (Greece) | 88–78 | (Croatia) Split CO |

- Day 3 (November 13, 2001)

| Team 1 | Score | Team 2 |
|---|---|---|
| Slovakofarma Pezinok (Slovakia) | 85–89* | (Croatia) Split CO |

^{*}Overtime at the end of regulation (75–75).

- Day 4 (December 4, 2001)

| Team 1 | Score | Team 2 |
|---|---|---|
| Split CO (Croatia) | 87–84 | (Cyprus) Keravnos Keo |

- Day 5 (December 11, 2001)

| Team 1 | Score | Team 2 |
|---|---|---|
| FMP Železnik (Federal Republic of Yugoslavia) | 96–83 | (Croatia) Split CO |

- Day 6 (December 18, 2001)

| Team 1 | Score | Team 2 |
|---|---|---|
| Igokea (Bosnia and Herzegovina) | 99–110 | (Croatia) Split CO |

- Day 7 (January 8, 2002)

| Team 1 | Score | Team 2 |
|---|---|---|
| Split CO (Croatia) | 87–92* | (Greece) Iraklis |

^{*}Overtime at the end of regulation (79–79).

- Day 8 (January 15, 2002)

| Team 1 | Score | Team 2 |
|---|---|---|
| Split CO (Croatia) | 86–80 | (Slovakia) Slovakofarma Pezinok |

- Day 9 (January 29, 2002)

| Team 1 | Score | Team 2 |
|---|---|---|
| Keravnos Keo (Cyprus) | 87–88 | (Croatia) Split CO |

- Day 10 (February 5, 2002)

| Team 1 | Score | Team 2 |
|---|---|---|
| Split CO (Croatia) | 73–78 | (Federal Republic of Yugoslavia) FMP Železnik |

- Group D standings:

| Po. | Team | Pld. | Pts. | W | L | PF | PA | PD | Tie-break |
|---|---|---|---|---|---|---|---|---|---|
| 1. | (Slovakia) Slovakofarma Pezinok | 10 | 18 | 8 | 2 | 827 | 736 | +91 | |
| 2. | (Greece) Iraklis | 10 | 17 | 7 | 3 | 815 | 707 | +108 | 1–1 (+24) |
| 3. | (Federal Republic of Yugoslavia) FMP Železnik | 10 | 17 | 7 | 3 | 818 | 770 | +48 | 1–1 (-24) |
| 4. | (Croatia) Split CO | 10 | 15 | 5 | 5 | 863 | 873 | -10 | |
| 5. | (Bosnia and Herzegovina) Igokea | 10 | 13 | 3 | 7 | 768 | 827 | -59 | |
| 6. | (Cyprus) Keravnos Keo | 10 | 10 | 0 | 10 | 696 | 874 | -178 | |

==== Top 16 ====
- Tie played on February 26, 2002, and on March 5, 2002.

| Team 1 | Agg. | Team 2 | 1st leg | 2nd leg |
|---|---|---|---|---|
| Split CO (Croatia) | 137–184 | (Lithuania) Lietuvos rytas | 67–100 | 70–84 |

=== 2002–03 FIBA Europe Champions Cup, 4th–tier ===
The 2002–03 FIBA Europe Champions Cup was the 1st installment of FIBA's 4th-tier level European-wide professional club basketball competition FIBA Europe Champions Cup (lately called FIBA EuroCup Challenge), running from October 1, 2002, to May 4, 2003. The trophy was won by Aris, who defeated Prokom Trefl Sopot by a result of 84–83 at Alexandreio Melathron in Thessaloniki, Greece. Overall, Split CO achieved in the present competition a record of 2 wins against 6 defeats, in only one round. More detailed:

==== Regular season ====
- Day 1 (October 1, 2002)

| Team 1 | Score | Team 2 |
|---|---|---|
| Split CO (Croatia) | 123–119* | (Greece) Maroussi Telestet |

^{*}Three overtimes at the end of regulation (90–90, 98–98 and 113–113).

- Day 2 (October 8, 2002)

| Team 1 | Score | Team 2 |
|---|---|---|
| Bnei HaSharon (Israel) | 95–83 | (Croatia) Split CO |

- Day 3 (October 15, 2002)

| Team 1 | Score | Team 2 |
|---|---|---|
| Split CO (Croatia) | 80–60 | (Cyprus) Keravnos Keo |

- Day 4 (October 22, 2002)

Bye

- Day 5 (October 29, 2002)

| Team 1 | Score | Team 2 |
|---|---|---|
| Split CO (Croatia) | 79–97 | (Greece) Aris |

- Day 6 (November 5, 2002)

| Team 1 | Score | Team 2 |
|---|---|---|
| Maroussi Telestet (Greece) | 119–85 | (Croatia) Split CO |

- Day 7 (November 12, 2002)

| Team 1 | Score | Team 2 |
|---|---|---|
| Split CO (Croatia) | 61–67 | (Israel) Bnei HaSharon |

- Day 8 (December 3, 2002)

| Team 1 | Score | Team 2 |
|---|---|---|
| Keravnos Keo (Cyprus) | 84–80 | (Croatia) Split CO |

- Day 9 (December 10, 2002)

Bye

- Day 10 (December 17, 2002)

| Team 1 | Score | Team 2 |
|---|---|---|
| Aris (Greece) | 111–88 | (Croatia) Split CO |

- Conference South Group C standings:

| Pos. | Team | Pld. | Pts. | W | L | PF | PA | PD | Tie-break |
|---|---|---|---|---|---|---|---|---|---|
| 1. | (Greece) Aris | 8 | 14 | 6 | 2 | 701 | 633 | +68 | |
| 2. | (Israel) Bnei HaSharon | 8 | 13 | 5 | 3 | 668 | 632 | +36 | 1–1 (+12) |
| 3. | (Greece) Maroussi Telestet | 8 | 13 | 5 | 3 | 731 | 694 | +37 | 1–1 (-12) |
| 4. | (Croatia) Split CO | 8 | 10 | 2 | 6 | 679 | 752 | -73 | 1–1 (+16) |
| 5. | (Cyprus) Keravnos Keo | 8 | 10 | 2 | 6 | 567 | 635 | -68 | 1–1 (-16) |

=== 2003–04 ULEB Cup, 2nd–tier ===
The 2003–04 ULEB Cup was the 2nd installment of ULEB's 2nd-tier level European-wide professional club basketball competition ULEB Cup (lately called EuroCup Basketball), running from November 11, 2003, to April 13, 2004. The trophy was won by Hapoel Migdal Jerusalem, who defeated Real Madrid by a result of 83–72 at Spiroudome in Charleroi, Belgium. Overall, Split CO achieved in the present competition a record of 4 wins against 6 defeats, in only one round. More detailed:

==== Regular season ====
- Day 1 (November 11, 2003)

| Team 1 | Score | Team 2 |
|---|---|---|
| Brighton Bears (England) | 86–87* | (Croatia) Split CO |

^{*}Overtime at the end of regulation (78–78).

- Day 2 (November 18, 2003)

| Team 1 | Score | Team 2 |
|---|---|---|
| Split CO (Croatia) | 65–84 | (Lithuania) Lietuvos rytas |

- Day 3 (November 25, 2003)

| Team 1 | Score | Team 2 |
|---|---|---|
| Cholet (France) | 88–72 | (Croatia) Split CO |

- Day 4 (December 2, 2003)

| Team 1 | Score | Team 2 |
|---|---|---|
| Split CO (Croatia) | 84–75 | (Greece) Ionikos Egnatia Bank |

- Day 5 (December 10, 2003)

| Team 1 | Score | Team 2 |
|---|---|---|
| Prokom Trefl Sopot (Poland) | 93–66 | (Croatia) Split CO |

- Day 6 (December 16, 2003)

| Team 1 | Score | Team 2 |
|---|---|---|
| Split CO (Croatia) | 85–91 | (England) Brighton Bears |

- Day 7 (January 6, 2004)

| Team 1 | Score | Team 2 |
|---|---|---|
| Lietuvos rytas (Lithuania) | 103–56 | (Croatia) Split CO |

- Day 8 (January 13, 2004)

| Team 1 | Score | Team 2 |
|---|---|---|
| Split CO (Croatia) | 100–73 | (France) Cholet |

- Day 9 (January 20, 2004)

| Team 1 | Score | Team 2 |
|---|---|---|
| Ionikos Egnatia Bank (Greece) | 97–91* | (Croatia) Split CO |

^{*}Overtime at the end of regulation (77–77).

- Day 10 (January 27, 2004)

| Team 1 | Score | Team 2 |
|---|---|---|
| Split CO (Croatia) | 86–78 | (Poland) Prokom Trefl Sopot |

- Group F standings:

| Pos. | Team | Pld. | W | L | PF | PA | PD | Tie-break |
|---|---|---|---|---|---|---|---|---|
| 1. | (Lithuania) Lietuvos rytas | 10 | 8 | 2 | 786 | 660 | +126 | |
| 2. | (Poland) Prokom Trefl Sopot | 10 | 7 | 3 | 790 | 696 | +94 | |
| 3. | (England) Brighton Bears | 10 | 4 | 6 | 791 | 807 | -16 | 2–2 (+6) |
| 4. | (Croatia) Split CO | 10 | 4 | 6 | 792 | 868 | -76 | 2–2 (+6) |
| 5. | (France) Cholet | 10 | 4 | 6 | 762 | 817 | -55 | 2–2 (-12) |
| 6. | (Greece) Ionikos Egnatia Bank | 10 | 3 | 7 | 794 | 867 | -73 | |

== Worldwide and other prestigious (semi-official) European competitions ==
=== 1973 VII FIBA Intercontinental Cup "William Jones" ===
The 1973 VII FIBA Intercontinental Cup "William Jones" was the 7th installment of the FIBA Intercontinental Cup for men's professional basketball clubs, running from May 1, 1973, to May 5, 1973. It took place at Ginásio do Ibirapuera in São Paulo, Brazil and the trophy was won by Ignis Varese.

==== Round-robin tournament ====
- Day 1 (May 1, 1973)

| Team 1 | Score | Team 2 |
|---|---|---|
| Sírio (Brazil) | 96–75 | (Socialist Federal Republic of Yugoslavia) Jugoplastika |

- Day 2 (May 2, 1973)

| Team 1 | Score | Team 2 |
|---|---|---|
| Jugoplastika (Socialist Federal Republic of Yugoslavia) | 76–84 | (Puerto Rico) Vaqueros de Bayamón |

- Day 3 (May 3, 1973)

| Team 1 | Score | Team 2 |
|---|---|---|
| Ignis Varese (Italy) | 92–78 | (Socialist Federal Republic of Yugoslavia) Jugoplastika |

- Day 4 (May 4, 1973)

Bye

- Day 5 (May 5, 1973)

| Team 1 | Score | Team 2 |
|---|---|---|
| Jugoplastika (Socialist Federal Republic of Yugoslavia) | 102–84 | (United States) Lexington Marathon Oilers |

- Final standings:

| Pos. | Team | Pld. | Pts. | W | L | PF | PA | PD | Tie-break |
|---|---|---|---|---|---|---|---|---|---|
| 1. | (Italy) Ignis Varese | 4 | 6 | 3 | 1 | 364 | 314 | +50 | 1–1 (+21) |
| 2. | (Brazil) Sírio | 4 | 6 | 3 | 1 | 369 | 334 | +35 | 1–1 (+4) |
| 3. | (Puerto Rico) Vaqueros de Bayamón | 4 | 6 | 3 | 1 | 322 | 335 | -13 | 1–1 (-25) |
| 4. | (Socialist Federal Republic of Yugoslavia) Jugoplastika | 4 | 2 | 1 | 3 | 331 | 356 | -25 | |
| 5. | (United States) Lexington Marathon Oilers | 4 | 0 | 0 | 4 | 342 | 389 | -47 | |

=== 1988 VI ACB International Tournament "V Memorial Héctor Quiroga" ===
The 1988 VI ACB International Tournament "V Memorial Héctor Quiroga" was the 6th semi-official installment of the European Basketball Club Super Cup for men's professional basketball clubs, running from October 11, 1988, to October 13, 1988. It took place at Pabellón Municipal in Puerto Real, Spain, and the trophy was won by Real Madrid.

==== Round-robin tournament ====
- Day 1 (October 11, 1988)

| Team 1 | Score | Team 2 |
|---|---|---|
| FC Barcelona (Spain) | 83–86 | (Socialist Federal Republic of Yugoslavia) Jugoplastika |

- Day 2 (October 12, 1988)

| Team 1 | Score | Team 2 |
|---|---|---|
| Jugoplastika (Socialist Federal Republic of Yugoslavia) | 107–90 | (Soviet Union) CSKA Moscow |

- Day 3 (October 13, 1988)

| Team 1 | Score | Team 2 |
|---|---|---|
| Real Madrid (Spain) | 95–88 | (Socialist Federal Republic of Yugoslavia) Jugoplastika |

- Final standings:

| Pos. | Team | Pld. | Pts. | W | L | PF | PA | PD |
|---|---|---|---|---|---|---|---|---|
| 1. | (Spain) Real Madrid | 3 | 6 | 3 | 0 | 263 | 248 | +15 |
| 2. | (Socialist Federal Republic of Yugoslavia) Jugoplastika | 3 | 5 | 2 | 1 | 281 | 268 | +13 |
| 3. | (Soviet Union) CSKA Moscow | 3 | 4 | 1 | 2 | 259 | 274 | -15 |
| 4. | (Spain) FC Barcelona | 3 | 3 | 0 | 3 | 249 | 262 | -13 |

=== 1989 VII ACB International Tournament "VI Memorial Héctor Quiroga" ===
The 1989 VII ACB International Tournament "VI Memorial Héctor Quiroga" was the 7th semi-official installment of the European Basketball Club Super Cup for men's professional basketball clubs, running from October 8, 1989, to October 10, 1989. It took place at Pabellón Municipal in Puerto Real, Spain, and the trophy was won by Real Madrid.

==== Round-robin tournament ====
- Day 1 (October 8, 1989)

| Team 1 | Score | Team 2 |
|---|---|---|
| Real Madrid (Spain) | 72–71 | (Socialist Federal Republic of Yugoslavia) Jugoplastika |

- Day 2 (October 9, 1989)

| Team 1 | Score | Team 2 |
|---|---|---|
| Jugoplastika (Socialist Federal Republic of Yugoslavia) | 99–95 | (Italy) Philips Milano |

- Day 3 (October 10, 1989)

| Team 1 | Score | Team 2 |
|---|---|---|
| FC Barcelona Banca Catalana (Spain) | 83–88 | (Socialist Federal Republic of Yugoslavia) Jugoplastika |

- Final standings:

| Pos. | Team | Pld. | Pts. | W | L | PF | PA | PD |
|---|---|---|---|---|---|---|---|---|
| 1. | (Spain) Real Madrid | 3 | 6 | 3 | 0 | 282 | 263 | +19 |
| 2. | (Socialist Federal Republic of Yugoslavia) Jugoplastika | 3 | 5 | 2 | 1 | 258 | 250 | +8 |
| 3. | (Italy) Philips Milano | 3 | 4 | 1 | 2 | 325 | 324 | +1 |
| 4. | (Spain) FC Barcelona Banca Catalana | 3 | 3 | 0 | 3 | 259 | 287 | -28 |

=== 1989 McDonald's Open ===
The 1989 McDonald's Open was the 3rd installment of the international men's professional basketball club tournament McDonald's Open (lately called McDonald's Championship), running from October 20, 1989, to October 22, 1989. It took place at PalaEUR in Rome, Italy, and the trophy was won by Denver Nuggets, who defeated Jugoplastika by a result of 135–129.

==== Semifinals ====
- 20 October 1989 at PalaEUR in Rome, Italy.

| Team 1 | Score | Team 2 |
|---|---|---|
| Jugoplastika (Socialist Federal Republic of Yugoslavia) | 83–88 | (Italy) Philips Milano |

==== Final ====
- 22 October 1989 at PalaEUR in Rome, Italy.

| Team 1 | Score | Team 2 |
|---|---|---|
| Jugoplastika (Socialist Federal Republic of Yugoslavia) | 129–135 | (United States) Denver Nuggets |

- Final standings:

| Pos. | Team | Rec. |
|---|---|---|
| | (United States) Denver Nuggets | 2–0 |
| Silver medal | (Socialist Federal Republic of Yugoslavia) Jugoplastika | 1–1 |
| Bronze medal | (Italy) Philips Milano | 1–1 |
| 4th | (Spain) FC Barcelona Banca Catalana | 0–2 |

=== 1989 XXV FIBA International Christmas Tournament ===
The 1989 XXV FIBA International Christmas Tournament "Trofeo Raimundo Saporta-Memorial Fernando Martín" was the 25th installment of the international men's professional basketball club tournament FIBA International Christmas Tournament, running from December 24, 1989, to December 26, 1989. It took place at Palacio de Deportes de la Comunidad de Madrid in Madrid, Spain, and the trophy was won by Jugoplastika.

==== Round-robin tournament ====
- Day 1 (December 24, 1989)

| Team 1 | Score | Team 2 |
|---|---|---|
| Jugoplastika (Socialist Federal Republic of Yugoslavia) | 75–68 | (Greece) Aris |

- Day 2 (December 25, 1989)

| Team 1 | Score | Team 2 |
|---|---|---|
| Jugoplastika (Socialist Federal Republic of Yugoslavia) | 86–77 | (Israel) Maccabi Elite Tel Aviv |

- Day 3 (December 26, 1989)

| Team 1 | Score | Team 2 |
|---|---|---|
| Real Madrid (Spain) | 83–82 | (Socialist Federal Republic of Yugoslavia) Jugoplastika |

- Final standings:

| Pos. | Team | Pld. | Pts. | W | L | PF | PA | PD | Tie-break |
|---|---|---|---|---|---|---|---|---|---|
| 1. | (Socialist Federal Republic of Yugoslavia) Jugoplastika | 3 | 5 | 2 | 1 | 243 | 228 | +15 | 1–1 (+6) |
| 2. | (Spain) Real Madrid | 3 | 5 | 2 | 1 | 272 | 258 | +14 | 1–1 (-3) |
| 3. | (Greece) Aris | 3 | 5 | 2 | 1 | 240 | 228 | +12 | 1–1 (-3) |
| 4. | (Israel) Maccabi Elite Tel Aviv | 3 | 3 | 0 | 3 | 246 | 287 | -41 | |

=== 1990 VIII ACB International Tournament "VII Memorial Héctor Quiroga" ===
The 1990 VIII ACB International Tournament "VII Memorial Héctor Quiroga" was the 8th semi-official installment of the European Basketball Club Super Cup for men's professional basketball clubs, running from September 7, 1990, to September 9, 1990. It took place at Pabellón Municipal in Puerto Real, Spain, and the trophy was won by POP 84.

==== Round-robin tournament ====
- Day 1 (September 7, 1990)

| Team 1 | Score | Team 2 |
|---|---|---|
| Montigalà Joventut (Spain) | 77–81 | (Socialist Federal Republic of Yugoslavia) POP 84 |

- Day 2 (September 8, 1990)

| Team 1 | Score | Team 2 |
|---|---|---|
| POP 84 (Socialist Federal Republic of Yugoslavia) | 94–81 | (Israel) Maccabi Elite Tel Aviv |

- Day 3 (September 9, 1990)

| Team 1 | Score | Team 2 |
|---|---|---|
| FC Barcelona Banca Catalana (Spain) | 77–80 | (Socialist Federal Republic of Yugoslavia) POP 84 |

- Final standings:

| Pos. | Team | Pld. | Pts. | W | L | PF | PA | PD |
|---|---|---|---|---|---|---|---|---|
| 1. | (Socialist Federal Republic of Yugoslavia) POP 84 | 3 | 6 | 3 | 0 | 255 | 235 | +20 |
| 2. | (Spain) Montigalà Joventut | 3 | 5 | 2 | 1 | 280 | 263 | +17 |
| 3. | (Israel) Maccabi Elite Tel Aviv | 3 | 4 | 1 | 2 | 269 | 288 | -19 |
| 4. | (Spain) FC Barcelona Banca Catalana | 3 | 3 | 0 | 3 | 241 | 259 | -18 |

=== 1990 McDonald's Open ===
The 1990 McDonald's Open was the 4th installment of the international men's professional basketball club tournament McDonald's Open (lately called McDonald's Championship), running from October 11, 1990, to October 13, 1990. It took place at Palau Sant Jordi in Barcelona, Spain, and the trophy was won by New York Knicks, who defeated POP 84 by a result of 117–101.

==== Semifinals ====
- 11 October 1990 at Palau Sant Jordi in Barcelona, Spain.

| Team 1 | Score | Team 2 |
|---|---|---|
| POP 84 (Socialist Federal Republic of Yugoslavia) | 102–97 | (Spain) FC Barcelona Banca Catalana |

==== Final ====
- 13 October 1990 at Palau Sant Jordi in Barcelona, Spain.

| Team 1 | Score | Team 2 |
|---|---|---|
| POP 84 (Socialist Federal Republic of Yugoslavia) | 101–117 | (United States) New York Knicks |

- Final standings:

| Pos. | Team | Rec. |
|---|---|---|
| | (United States) New York Knicks | 2–0 |
| Silver medal | (Socialist Federal Republic of Yugoslavia) POP 84 | 1–1 |
| Bronze medal | (Spain) FC Barcelona Banca Catalana | 1–1 |
| 4th | (Italy) Scavolini Pesaro | 0–2 |

=== 1990 XXVI FIBA International Christmas Tournament ===
The 1990 XXVI FIBA International Christmas Tournament "Trofeo Raimundo Saporta-Memorial Fernando Martín" was the 26th installment of the international men's professional basketball club tournament FIBA International Christmas Tournament, running from December 24, 1990, to December 26, 1990. It took place at Palacio de Deportes de la Comunidad de Madrid in Madrid, Spain, and the trophy was won by Real Madrid Otaysa.

==== Round-robin tournament ====
- Day 1 (December 24, 1990)

| Team 1 | Score | Team 2 |
|---|---|---|
| POP 84 (Socialist Federal Republic of Yugoslavia) | 113–90 | (Israel) Maccabi Elite Tel Aviv |

- Day 2 (December 25, 1990)

| Team 1 | Score | Team 2 |
|---|---|---|
| POP 84 (Socialist Federal Republic of Yugoslavia) | 84–74 | (France) Limoges CSP |

- Day 3 (December 26, 1990)

| Team 1 | Score | Team 2 |
|---|---|---|
| Real Madrid Otaysa (Spain) | 82–78 | (Socialist Federal Republic of Yugoslavia) POP 84 |

- Final standings:

| Pos. | Team | Pld. | Pts. | W | L | PF | PA | PD | Tie-break |
|---|---|---|---|---|---|---|---|---|---|
| 1. | (Spain) Real Madrid Otaysa | 3 | 5 | 2 | 1 | 267 | 242 | +25 | 1–0 |
| 2. | (Socialist Federal Republic of Yugoslavia) POP 84 | 3 | 5 | 2 | 1 | 275 | 246 | +29 | 0–1 |
| 3. | (Israel) Maccabi Elite Tel Aviv | 3 | 4 | 1 | 2 | 257 | 297 | -40 | 1–0 |
| 4. | (France) Limoges CSP | 3 | 4 | 1 | 2 | 246 | 260 | -14 | 0–1 |

=== 1991 IX ACB International Tournament "VIII Memorial Héctor Quiroga" ===
The 1991 IX ACB International Tournament "VIII Memorial Héctor Quiroga" was the 9th semi-official installment of the European Basketball Club Super Cup for men's professional basketball clubs, running from September 6, 1991, to September 8, 1991. It took place at Pabellón Municipal in Puerto Real, Spain. The trophy was won by Maccabi Elite Tel Aviv.

==== Round-robin tournament ====
- Day 1 (September 6, 1991)

| Team 1 | Score | Team 2 |
|---|---|---|
| Montigalà Joventut (Spain) | 75–73 | (Croatia) Slobodna Dalmacija |

- Day 2 (September 7, 1991)

| Team 1 | Score | Team 2 |
|---|---|---|
| Slobodna Dalmacija (Croatia) | 71–99 | (Israel) Maccabi Elite Tel Aviv |

- Day 3 (September 8, 1991)

| Team 1 | Score | Team 2 |
|---|---|---|
| FC Barcelona Banca Catalana (Spain) | 68–65 | (Croatia) Slobodna Dalmacija |

- Final standings:

| Pos. | Team | Pld. | Pts. | W | L | PF | PA | PD |
|---|---|---|---|---|---|---|---|---|
| 1. | (Israel) Maccabi Elite Tel Aviv | 3 | 6 | 3 | 0 | 259 | 209 | +50 |
| 2. | (Spain) Montigalà Joventut | 3 | 5 | 2 | 1 | 226 | 227 | -1 |
| 3. | (Spain) FC Barcelona Banca Catalana | 3 | 4 | 1 | 2 | 203 | 219 | -16 |
| 4. | (Croatia) Slobodna Dalmacija | 3 | 3 | 0 | 3 | 209 | 242 | -33 |

=== 1991 McDonald's Open ===
The 1991 McDonald's Open was the 5th installment of the international men's professional basketball club tournament McDonald's Open (lately called McDonald's Championship), running from October 18, 1991, to October 19, 1991. It took place at Palais Omnisports de Paris-Bercy in Paris, France, and the trophy was won by Los Angeles Lakers, who defeated Montigalà Joventut by a result of 116–114.

==== Semifinals ====
- 18 October 1991 at Palais Omnisports de Paris-Bercy in Paris, France.

| Team 1 | Score | Team 2 |
|---|---|---|
| Montigalà Joventut (Spain) | 117–86 | (Croatia) Slobodna Dalmacija |

==== 3rd place game ====
- 19 October 1991 at Palais Omnisports de Paris-Bercy in Paris, France.

| Team 1 | Score | Team 2 |
|---|---|---|
| Slobodna Dalmacija (Croatia) | 91–105 | (France) Limoges CSP |

- Final standings:

| Pos. | Team | Rec. |
|---|---|---|
| | (United States) Los Angeles Lakers | 2–0 |
| Silver medal | (Spain) Montigalà Joventut | 1–1 |
| Bronze medal | (France) Limoges CSP | 1–1 |
| 4th | (Croatia) Slobodna Dalmacija | 0–2 |

== Record ==
KK Split has overall, from 1971 to 1972 (first participation): 219 wins against 153 defeats plus 2 draws in 374 games for all the European club competitions.

- EuroLeague: 99–67 (166)
- FIBA Saporta Cup: 63–45 plus 1 draw (109) /// EuroCup Basketball: 4–6 (10)
- FIBA Korać Cup: 50–28 plus 1 draw (79)
- FIBA EuroCup Challenge: 2–6 (8)
- Basketball Champions League: 1–1

Also KK Split has a 1–3 record in the FIBA Intercontinental Cup and a 2–4 record in McDonald's Championship.

== See also ==
- Yugoslav basketball clubs in European competitions
