= 1990 XXVI FIBA International Christmas Tournament =

1990 XXVI FIBA International Christmas Tournament "Trofeo Raimundo Saporta-Memorial Fernando Martín"
- Sport: Basketball
- Finals champions: (Spain) Real Madrid Otaysa
- Runners-up: (Socialist Federal Republic of Yugoslavia) POP 84

FIBA International Christmas Tournament seasons
- ← 1989 1991 →

The 1990 XXVI FIBA International Christmas Tournament "Trofeo Raimundo Saporta-Memorial Fernando Martín" was the 26th edition of the FIBA International Christmas Tournament. It took place at Palacio de Deportes de la Comunidad de Madrid, Madrid, Spain, on 24, 25 and 26 December 1990 with the participations of Real Madrid Otaysa (runners-up of the 1989–90 FIBA European Cup Winners' Cup), POP 84 (champions of the 1989–90 FIBA European Champions Cup), Maccabi Elite Tel Aviv (champions of the 1989–90 Ligat HaAl) and Limoges CSP (champions of the 1989–90 Nationale 1A).

== League stage ==
Day 1, December 24, 1990

Team 1	Score	Team 2
Real Madrid Otaysa (Spain)	83–90	(France) Limoges CSP
POP 84 (Socialist Federal Republic of Yugoslavia)	113–90	(Israel) Maccabi Elite Tel Aviv

Day 2, December 25, 1990

Team 1	Score	Team 2
Real Madrid Otaysa (Spain)	102–74	(Israel) Maccabi Elite Tel Aviv
POP 84 (Socialist Federal Republic of Yugoslavia)	84–74	(France) Limoges CSP

Day 3, December 26, 1990

Team 1	Score	Team 2
Real Madrid Otaysa (Spain)	82–78	(Socialist Federal Republic of Yugoslavia) POP 84
Maccabi Elite Tel Aviv (Israel)	93–82	(France) Limoges CSP

== Final standings ==
	Team	Pld	Pts	W	L	PF	PA
1.	(Spain) Real Madrid Otaysa	3	5	2	1	267	242
2.	(Socialist Federal Republic of Yugoslavia) POP 84	3	5	2	1	275	246
3.	(Israel) Maccabi Elite Tel Aviv	3	4	1	2	257	297
4.	(France) Limoges CSP	3	4	1	2	246	260

1990 XXVI FIBA International Christmas Tournament
"Trofeo Raimundo Saporta-Memorial Fernando Martín" Champions

Real Madrid Otaysa
17th title
