= 1989 XXV FIBA International Christmas Tournament =

1989 XXV FIBA International Christmas Tournament "Trofeo Raimundo Saporta-Memorial Fernando Martín"
- Sport: Basketball
- Finals champions: (Socialist Federal Republic of Yugoslavia) Jugoplastika
- Runners-up: (Spain) Real Madrid

FIBA International Christmas Tournament seasons
- ← 1988 1990 →

The 1989 XXV FIBA International Christmas Tournament "Trofeo Raimundo Saporta-Memorial Fernando Martín" was the 25th edition of the FIBA International Christmas Tournament. It took place at Palacio de Deportes de la Comunidad de Madrid, Madrid, Spain, on 24, 25 and 26 December 1989 with the participations of Real Madrid (champions of the 1988–89 FIBA European Cup Winners' Cup), Jugoplastika (champions of the 1988–89 FIBA European Champions Cup), Aris (champions of the 1988–89 Greek Basket League) and Maccabi Elite Tel Aviv (runners-up of the 1988–89 FIBA European Champions Cup).

== League stage ==
Day 1, December 24, 1989

Team 1	Score	Team 2
Real Madrid (Spain)	111–94	(Israel) Maccabi Elite Tel Aviv
Jugoplastika (Socialist Federal Republic of Yugoslavia)	75–68	(Greece) Aris

Day 2, December 25, 1989

Team 1	Score	Team 2
Real Madrid (Spain)	78–82	(Greece) Aris
Jugoplastika (Socialist Federal Republic of Yugoslavia)	86–77	(Israel) Maccabi Elite Tel Aviv

Day 3, December 26, 1989

Team 1	Score	Team 2
Real Madrid (Spain)	83–82	(Socialist Federal Republic of Yugoslavia) Jugoplastika
Aris (Greece)	90–75	(Israel) Maccabi Elite Tel Aviv

== Final standings ==
	Team	Pld	Pts	W	L	PF	PA	PD	
1.	(Socialist Federal Republic of Yugoslavia) Jugoplastika	3	5	2	1	243	228	+15	1-1
2.	(Spain) Real Madrid	3	5	2	1	272	258	+14	1-1
3.	(Greece) Aris	3	5	2	1	240	228	+12	1-1
4.	(Israel) Maccabi Elite Tel Aviv	3	3	0	3	246	287		

1989 XXV FIBA International Christmas Tournament
"Trofeo Raimundo Saporta-Memorial Fernando Martín" Champions

Jugoplastika
1st title
