= 2006–07 NBB Cup =

The 2006–07 NBB Cup (in Dutch: NBB-Beker) was the 39th season of the NBB Cup, the national cup competition for men's basketball teams in the Netherlands.

Matrixx Magixx won its first-ever cup title after beating Hanzevast Capitals in the final on 25 March.

== Bracket ==
The following is the bracket from the eight-finals to the finals.

Eight-finals
Rotterdam United	87
Woon! Aris	93
Matrixx Magixx U22	56
Omniworld Almere	94
CBV Binnenland	49
ZZ Leiden	83
Matrixx Magixx	73
Landstede Zwolle	62
Polynorm Giants	87
EiffelTowers Den Bosch	79
EBBC 2	43
Amsterdam Astronauts	110
Akrides	39
Hanzevast Capitals	75
Upstairs Weert	74
Rotterdam Basketbal	65

Quarter-finals
Woon! Aris	89
Omniworld Almere	83
ZZ Leiden	71
Matrixx Magixx	75
Polynorm Giants	84
Amsterdam Astronauts	72
Hanzevast Capitals	78
Upstairs Weert	47

Semi-finals
Woon! Aris	95
Matrixx Magixx	104
Polynorm Giants	68
Hanzevast Capitals	79

Final
Matrixx Magixx	70
Hanzevast Capitals	60

== Final ==
25 March 2007
14:00

Statistics

Matrixx Magixx	70–60	Hanzevast Capitals
Pts: Mohammed 23; Rebs: Carrawell 9 Asts: Sears 7 Eff: Mohammed 25		Pts: Hinson 26; Rebs: Turek 11; Asts: Heinen, Turek 3 each Eff: Hinson, Turek 17 each

Martiniplaza, Groningen
Referees: Antio Sinterniklaas, Martijn de Vries, Karel Kraaijeveld

=== Statistics ===
Statistics for the title game are below. Darnell Hinson scored 26 points for the Capitals, while Alhaji Mohammed led the Magixx in scoring with 23 points.

Key

No	Uniform number
*	Starting lineup
Pos	Position
	led team in category

Pts	Points scored
Reb	Rebounds
Ast	Assists
Min	Minutes played

Matrixx Magixx

Coach: Michael Schuurs

No.	Pos	Player	Pts	Reb	Ast	Min	Nat.
5	G	Ryan Sears	3	2	7	40	USA
7	G/F	Chris Carrawell	12	9	3	32	USA
9	F/C	Johnson Shawnson	10	5	0	13	USA
11	G	Alhaji Mohammed	23	5	6	35	GHA
13	F	Seamus Boxley	12	4	1	33	USA
14	C	Ransford Brempong	8	8	0	30	CAN
15	C	Nick Oudendag	0	1	0	4	NED
16	F	Ralph van den Bosch	2	0	0	13	NED

Hanzevast Capitals

Coach: Ton Boot

No.	Pos	Player	Pts	Reb	Ast	Min	Nat.
4	G	Gary Buchanan	7	0	0	26	USA
5	F	Raoul Heinen	5	2	3	5	NED
6	F	Chris Woods	2	4	0	24	USA
8	PG	Darnell Hinson	26	2	2	37	USA
9	SF	Niels Meijer	3	7	0	12	NED
10	G	Shantay Legans	8	6	0	18	USA
11	F	Joshua Helm	1	6	1	26	USA
12	PF	Dan Oppland	0	2	0	13	USA
14	PF	John Turek	8	11	3	29	USA
