= Dimeo van der Horst =

Dutch basketball player

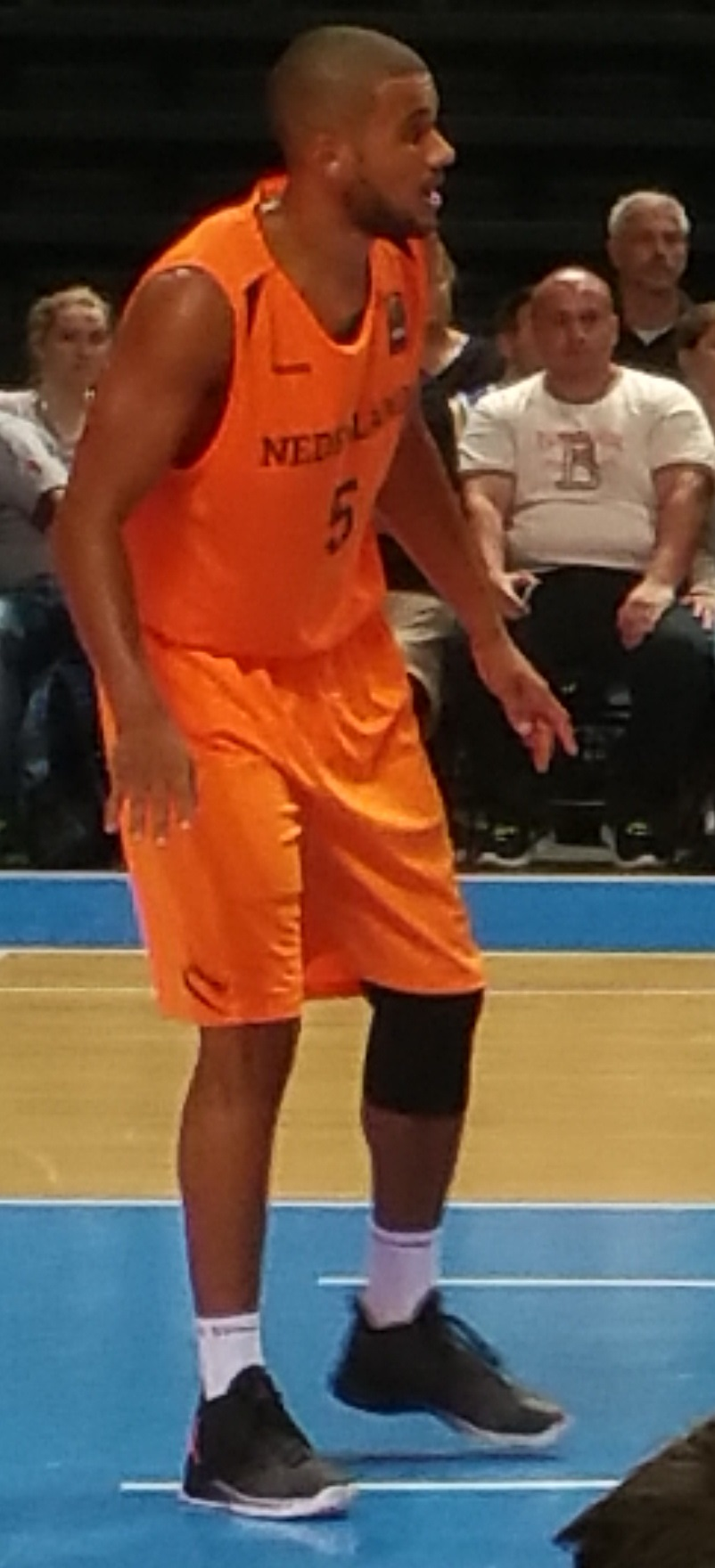
- Van der Horst playing for the Netherlands in 2016

Personal information
- Born: 23 June 1991 (age 35) Amsterdam, Netherlands
- Listed height: 1.95 m (6 ft 5 in)

Career information
- Playing career: 2007–2019
- Position: Point guard

Career history
- 2007–2011: ABC Amsterdam
- 2011–2012: Matrixx Magixx
- 2012–2013: GasTerra Flames
- 2013–2014: Matrixx Magixx
- 2014–2019: Apollo Amsterdam

Career highlights
- 2× DBL champion (2008, 2009); DBL All-Star (2011)
Medals
Men's 3x3 basketball
Representing the Netherlands
Olympic Games
Gold medal – first place	2024 Paris	Team
World Cup
Silver medal – second place	2018 Manila	Team
Europe Cup
Bronze medal – third place	2018 Bucharest
Bronze medal – third place	2022 Graz

Dimeo van der Horst (born 23 June 1991) is a Dutch 3x3 basketball player who plays for the Netherlands men's national 3x3 team. Standing at 1.95 m (6 ft 5 in), Van der Horst primarily plays as point guard.

Born in Amsterdam, he played 11 seasons of professional basketball in the Dutch Basketball League for four different clubs.

== Professional career ==
=== Amsterdam ===
Van der Horst started his professional career in 2007 with Amsterdam Basketball, making his debut in a friendly game during the Haarlem Basketball Week, at age 16. He was given a place on the roster of the senior team in 2008–09 by coach Arik Shivek.

On 9 October 2008, Van der Horst made his debut in the Eredivisie, scoring 3 points against the West-Brabant Giants. He won the 2008 and 2009 national championship with Amsterdam. In 2011, the club was declared bankrupt, forcing Van der Horst to find a new club.

=== Matrixx Magixx ===
Van der Horst signed with the West-Brabant Giants in July 2011. However, the Giants were also dissolved after a bankruptcy, which led him to play for the Matrixx Magixx instead.

=== Donar ===
Van der Horst played as the back-up point guard for Donar (then named GasTerra Flames) in the 2012–13 season.

=== Return to the Magixx ===
Van der Horst returned to the Magixx for a second stint in 2013, after agreeing with Donar to leave his contract one year early.

=== Apollo Amsterdam ===
In 2013, Van der Horst returned to Amsterdam to play for the new club Apollo Amsterdam. He was the starting point guard for Apollo in five seasons. In the 2016–17 season, he averaged a career-high 15.5 points per game. On 21 December 2018, Van der Horst scored a career-high 35 points in a 91–89 home win over Rotterdam. In his final season, he averaged 15.5 points, 4.8 rebounds and 4.6 assists per game for Apollo.

== Netherlands national team ==
Van der Horst played for the Netherlands national basketball team at the EuroBasket 2017 qualification.

== 3x3 basketball ==
Van der Horst played with the Netherlands men's national 3x3 team at the 2018 FIBA 3x3 World Cup, where he won a silver medal. He also played at the 2019 FIBA 3x3 World Cup, where they finished seventh. One year later, Van der Horst played at the 2020 Summer Olympics in Tokyo, where they finished in the fifth place. At the 2024 Summer Olympics in Paris, he won a gold medal with the team.
