= John Turek =

American basketball player (born 1983)

Personal information
- Born: February 19, 1983 (age 43) Council Bluffs, Iowa, U.S.
- Listed height: 6 ft 9 in (2.06 m)
- Listed weight: 243 lb (110 kg)

Career information
- High school: Abraham Lincoln (Council Bluffs, Iowa)
- College: Nebraska (2001–2005)
- NBA draft: 2005: undrafted
- Playing career: 2005–2015
- Position: Center / power forward
- Number: 4, 12, 15, 44

Career history
- 2005–2006: Omniworld Almere
- 2006–2007: Hanzevast Capitals
- 2007–2008: Optima Gent
- 2008–2009: Turów Zgorzelec
- 2009–2010: Phoenix Hagen
- 2010–2011: GasTerra Flames
- 2012–2013: Neckar Riesen Ludwigsburg
- 2013–2014: Champagne Châlons-Reims
- 2014–2015: Rosa Radom

Career highlights
- BBL blocks leader (2010); DBL All-Star (2006); Dutch Cup champion (2011)

John Kaleb Turek (born February 19, 1983) is an American retired professional basketball player.

== Career ==
Standing at 6 ft 9 in (2.06 m), Turek played as power forward or center. He played collegiately for the Nebraska Cornhuskers and continued his career as a professional player in Europe. Turek played for teams based in the Netherlands, Belgium, Poland, Germany, and France.

== Personal life ==
His brother, Josh Turek, is a former wheelchair basketball player, Paralympic gold medalist, and was elected to the United States Senate in 2026.

== Honors ==
=== Club ===
GasTerra Flames

- NBB Cup (1): 2010–11

=== Individual ===
- BBL blocks leader (1): 2009–10
- DBL All-Star (1): 2006
