= 2007–08 Eredivisie (basketball) =

- League: Eredivisie
- Sport: Basketball
- Teams: 12

Regular season
- Top seed: MyGuide Amsterdam
- Season MVP: Peter van Paassen (Amsterdam)
- Top scorer: Darnell Wilson (Landstede)

Finals
- Champions: MyGuide Amsterdam (6th title)
- Runners-up: EiffelTowers Den Bosch

Dutch Basketball League seasons
- ← 2006–07 2008–09 →

The 2007–08 Eredivisie season was the 48th season of the Eredivisie in basketball, the highest professional basketball league in the Netherlands. MyGuide Amsterdam won their 6th national title.

== Regular season ==
| Pos. | Team | GP | W | L | Pts |
|---|---|---|---|---|---|
| 1 | MyGuide Amsterdam | 40 | 31 | 9 | 62 |
| 2 | EiffelTowers Den Bosch | 40 | 27 | 13 | 54 |
| 3 | West-Brabant Giants | 40 | 27 | 13 | 54 |
| 4 | Matrixx Magixx | 40 | 25 | 15 | 50 |
| 5 | Hanzevast Capitals | 40 | 24 | 16 | 48 |
| 6 | Rotterdam Challengers | 40 | 23 | 17 | 46 |
| 7 | Landstede Basketbal | 40 | 18 | 22 | 36 |
| 8 | Upstairs Weert | 40 | 17 | 23 | 34 |
| 9 | Zorg en Zekerheid Leiden | 40 | 15 | 25 | 30 |
| 10 | Aris Friesland | 40 | 8 | 32 | 16 |
| 11 | Den Helder Seals | 40 | 5 | 35 | 10 |
| 12 | Omniworld Almere^{1} | 0 | 0 | 0 | 0 |

Qualify for playoffs
Expelled

^{1} In January, Omniworld Almere was expelled from the competition after the club went bankrupt.

== Playoffs ==
Quarterfinals
1 | My-Guide Amsterdam | 2
8 | Upstairs Weert | 0
4 | Matrixx Magixx | 2
5 | Hanzevast Capitals | 1
2 | EiffelTowers Den Bosch | 2
7 | Landstede Basketbal | 0
3 | West-Brabant Giants | 2
6 | Rotterdam Challengers | 1

Semifinals
1 | My-Guide Amsterdam | 3
4 | Matrixx Magixx | 1
2 | EiffelTowers Den Bosch | 3
3 | West-Brabant Giants | 1

Finals
1 | My-Guide Amsterdam | 4
2 | EiffelTowers Den Bosch | 3

== Individual awards ==
- Most Valuable Player: Peter van Paassen (MyGuide Amsterdam)
- Coach of the Year: Erik Braal (West-Brabant Giants)
- Statistical Player of the Year: Ashley Champion (BS Weert)
- Rookie of the Year: Jeroen Slor (Rotterdam Challengers)
- MVP Under-23: Arvin Slagter (West-Brabant Giants)
- First-team All-Eredivisie:
  - Patrick Pope (West-Brabant Giants)
  - Teddy Gipson (MyGuide Amsterdam)
  - Antoine Jordan (Matrixx Magixx)
  - Tyler Smith (Matrixx Magixx)
  - Peter van Paassen (MyGuide Amsterdam)
- All-Defensive Team:
  - Jimmy Woudstra (Punch Delft)
  - Vic Bartolome (Leiden)
  - Steven Bravard (Den Bosch)
  - Jimmy Moore (Arke Stars Enschede)
  - Pete Miller (Donar)
