= 2011–12 NBB Cup =

NBB Cup
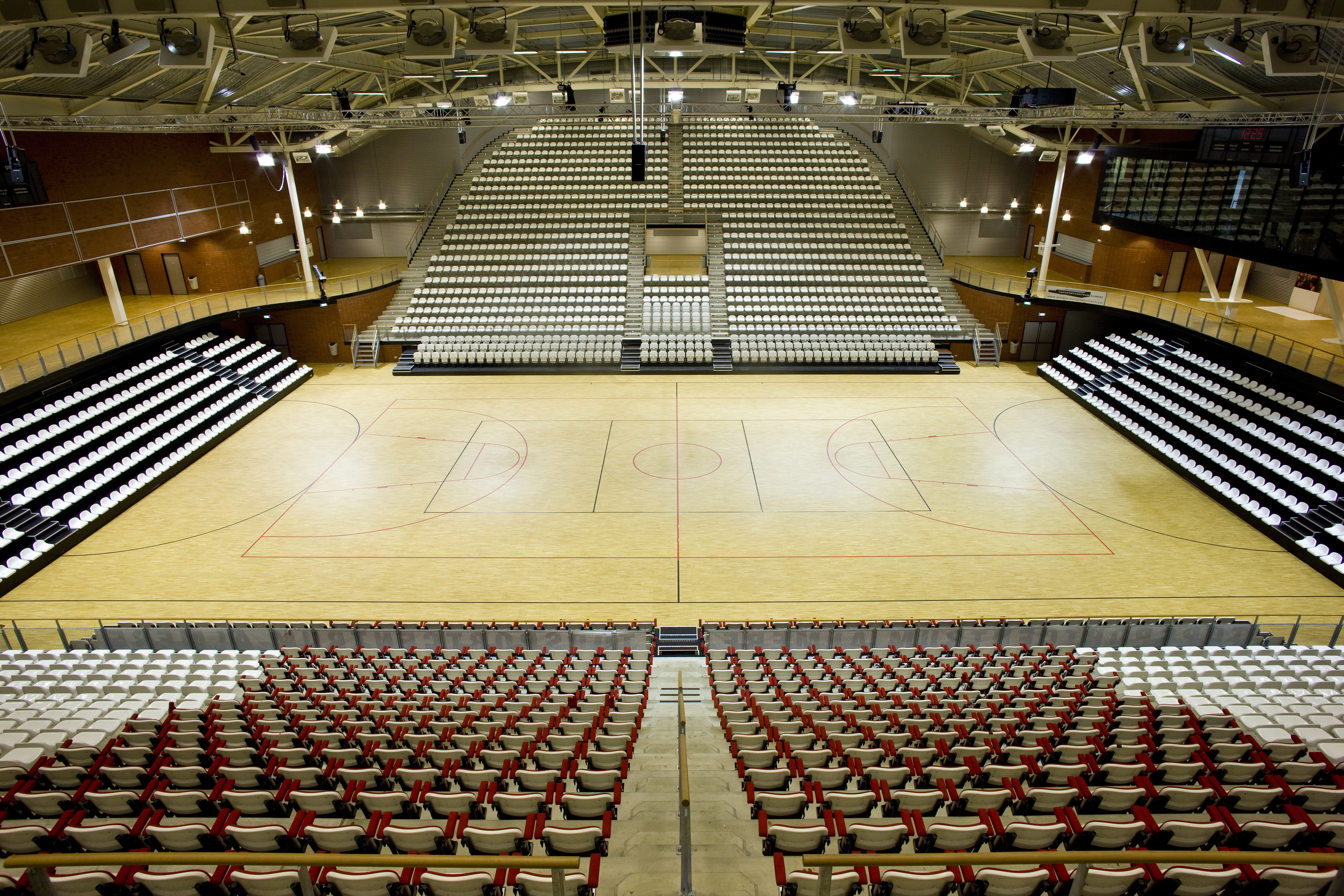
- The Final Four was played in the Topsportcentrum Almere
- Teams: 48 (total)

Finals
- Champions: ZZ Leiden (2nd title)
- Runners-up: Magixx KidsRights
- Semifinalists: Stepco BSW; Landstede Zwolle

The 2011–12 NBB Cup was the 44th season of the Dutch NBB Cup. The championship game was played in the Topsportcentrum (Almere). Zorg en Zekerheid Leiden won the cup, Magixx playing for KidsRights was the runner-up.

== Bracket ==
Round of 16
Akrides	57
Rotterdam	68
Binnenland	61
Landstede Zwolle	84
CobraNova	50
De Dunckers	59
Orca's Urk	53
ZZ Leiden	95
Grasshoppers	61
Stepco BSW	113
Cangeroes Utrecht	42
GasTerra Flames	93

Quarter-finals
Rotterdam Basketbal	136
Landstede Zwolle	153
De Dunckers	104
ZZ Leiden	205
Stepco BSW	171
GasTerra Flames	163
Magixx KidsRights	140
EiffelTowers Den Bosch	138

Semi-finals
Landstede Zwolle	47
ZZ Leiden	66
Stepco BSW	67
Magixx KidsRights	104

Final
ZZ Leiden	88
Magixx KidsRights	74

=== Final ===
1 April 2012	ZZ Leiden	88–74	Magixx Playing for KidsRights	Almere
15:00 GMT+1	Scoring by quarter: 28-17, 14-14, 15-16, 31-27
NOS	Pts: Boxley 25; Rebs: Hilliman 10; Asts: Jackson 6		Pts: Humphrey 25; Rebs: Humphrey 5 Asts: Acker 6	Arena: Topsportcentrum

Leiden

Magixx
