= Thomas Jackson (basketball) =

American basketball player and coach

Personal information
- Born: May 23, 1980 (age 46) East Lansing, Michigan
- Listed height: 5 ft 9 in (1.75 m)
- Listed weight: 165 lb (75 kg)

Career information
- High school: East Lansing (East Lansing, Michigan)
- College: Butler (1998–2002)
- NBA draft: 2002: undrafted
- Playing career: 2002–2015
- Coaching career: 2017–present

Career history

Playing
- 2003–2004: Sallen
- 2004–2005: Den Helder
- 2006–2009: Uppsala
- 2009–2010: Bayreuth
- 2010–2012: ZZ Leiden
- 2012–2015: Uppsala

Coaching
- 2017–2018: Erie BayHawks (assistant)
- 2018–2019: Maine Red Claws (assistant)
- 2019–2020: NAZ Suns (assistant)
- 2020–2022: Evansville (assistant)
- 2022–2023: Salt Lake City Stars (assistant)

Career highlights
- As player: DBL champion (2011); Dutch Cup champion (2012); Dutch Supercup champion (2012); ProA champion (2010); Basketligan All-Star (2007); DBL All-Star (2012)

Thomas V. "T. J." Jackson (born May 27, 1980) is an American professional basketball coach, and a former professional basketball player.

== Career ==
Jackson signed with the German BBC Bayreuth for the 2009–10 season. Bayreuth promoted to the Basketball Bundesliga that season. He was released after the season.

Jackson signed with Dutch team Zorg en Zekerheid Leiden for the 2010–11 season. He resigned after one year.

In October 2012 Jackson signed with Uppsala Basket from Uppsala, Sweden.

== Coaching career ==
On start of 2017–18 season the Erie BayHawks added Jackson to the coaching staff as assistant coach.

== Honours ==
=== Club ===
ZZ Leiden

- Dutch Basketball League (1): 2010–11
- NBB Cup (1): 2011–12
- Dutch Basketball Supercup (1): 2012

Bayreuth

- Pro A (1): 2009–10

=== Individual ===
Sallen

- Basketligan All-Star (1): 2007

ZZ Leiden

- DBL All-Star (1): 2012
