= Peter van Paassen =

Dutch basketball player

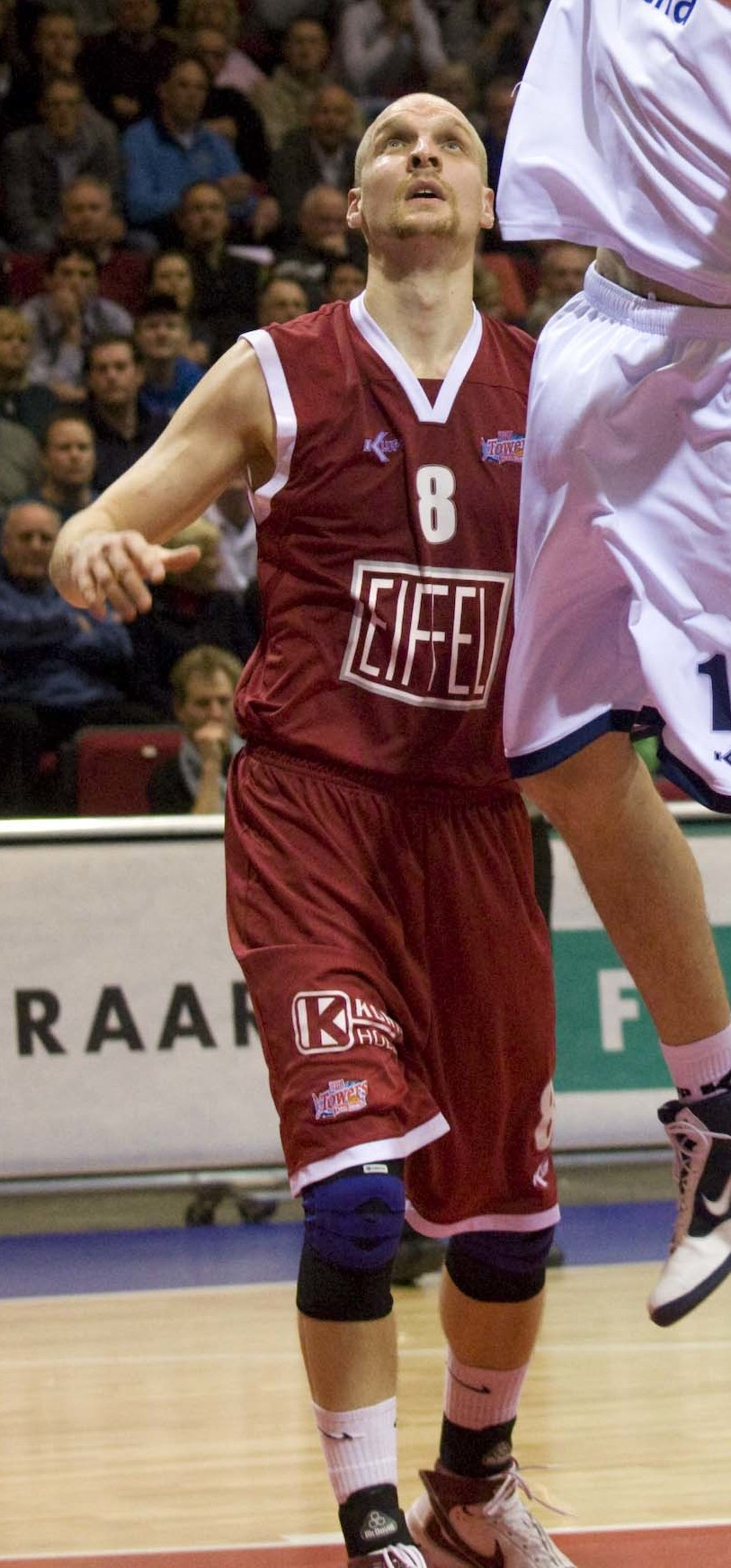
- Van Paassen with EiffelTowers in 2010

Personal information
- Born: 20 December 1978 (age 47) The Hague, Netherlands
- Listed height: 6 ft 11 in (2.11 m)

Career information
- College: St. Bonaventure (1997–2001)
- NBA draft: 2001: undrafted
- Playing career: 2001–2013
- Position: Center
- Number: 8, 12, 14

Career history

Playing
- 2001–2003: Oostende
- 2003–2004: Melilla
- 2004–2005: Den Helder
- 2005–2009: Amsterdam
- 2009–2013: EiffelTowers Den Bosch
- 2010–2011: →Mons-Hainaut

Coaching
- 2015–2017: Apollo Amsterdam (assistant)
- 2021–present: Orange Lions Academy (assistant)

Career highlights
- 2x DBL Most Valuable Player (2008, 2009); 3x DBL champion (2008, 2009, 2012); 2x Dutch Cup champion (2006, 2013); Belgian League champion (2002); Belgian Cup champion (2011); 2x All-DBL Team (2008, 2009); 4x DBL All-Star (2007–2010)

Peter van Paassen (born 20 December 1978) is a Dutch former basketball player. Van Paassen played for multiple teams in Belgium, Spain and the Netherlands. Standing at 6 ft 11 in (2.11 m), he usually played as center. Van Paassen has won the Dutch MVP award two times, which makes him one of the few Dutch players to ever win the award. On 20 August 2013, Van Paassen announced his retirement.

== International career ==
Van Paassen played 64 games for the Dutch national basketball team in his career.
