= 2005–06 Eredivisie (basketball) =

Eredivisie
- Season: 2005–06
- Teams: 9

Regular season
- Season MVP: Leon Rodgers

Finals
- Champions: EiffelTowers Den Bosch (13th title)
- Runners-up: MPC Capitals

Statistical leaders
Points	Chris Woods	23.0
Rebounds	Maurice Ingram	14.1
Assists	Taron Downey	7.9

The 2005–06 Eredivisie season was the 46th season of the Eredivisie in basketball, the highest professional basketball league in the Netherlands. EiffelTowers Den Bosch won their 13th national title after defeating MPC Capitals in the finals, 4–3.

== Regular season ==
Pos	Team	Pld	W	L	PF	PA	PD	Pts	Qualification or relegation
1	EiffelTowers Den Bosch	26	20	6	2098	2012	+86	40	Qualification for playoffs
2	Demon Astronauts	36	27	9	2038	1841	+197	54	Qualification for playoffs
3	MPC Capitals	36	26	10	2016	1854	+162	52	Qualification for playoffs
4	Rotterdam	36	20	16	2013	1934	+79	40	Qualification for playoffs
5	Landstede	36	19	17	2007	1972	+35	38	Qualification for playoffs
6	Matrixx Magixx	36	18	18	2049	2189	−140	36	Qualification for playoffs
7	Omniworld Almere	36	17	19	1861	1912	−51	34	Qualification for playoffs
8	Upstairs Weert	36	16	20	2007	2034	−27	32	Qualification for playoffs
9	Polynorm Giants	36	4	32	1878	1972	−94	8	

Source: DBL

== Playoffs ==
Quarterfinals
1	EiffelTowers Den Bosch	2
8	Upstairs Weert	1
4	Rotterdam	2
5	Landstede	0
2	Demon Astronauts	2
7	Omniworld Almere	0
3	MPC Capitals	2
6	Matrixx Magixx	1

Semifinals
1	EiffelTowers Den Bosch	3
4	Rotterdam	1
2	Demon Astronauts	1
3	MPC Capitals	3

Finals
1	EiffelTowers Den Bosch	4
3	MPC Capitals	3

== Individual awards ==
- Most Valuable Player: Leon Rodgers (EiffelTowers Den Bosch)
- Coach of the Year: Erik Braal (Rotterdam)
- Rookie of the Year: N/A
- Statistical Player of the Year: Chris Woods (Upstairs Weert)
- First-team All-Eredivisie:
  - Darnell Hinson (Landstede)
  - Leon Rodgers (EiffelTowers Den Bosch)
  - Travis Young (EiffelTowers Den Bosch)
  - Chris Woods (Upstairs Weert)
  - Travis Reed (MPC Donar)

== Statistics ==
Category	Player	Team(s)	Statistic
Points per game	Chris Woods	Upstairs Weert	23.0
Rebounds per game	Maurice Ingram	Upstairs Weert	14.1
Assists per game	Taron Downey	Upstairs Weert	7.9
Steals per game	Anthony Dill	Rotterdam	3.4
Blocks per game	Ransford Brempong	Matrixx Magixx	2.8
Efficiency per game	Chris Woods	Upstairs Weert	24.3
