= Tyrone Sally =

American basketball player

Personal information
- Born: January 25, 1982 (age 44) Richmond, Virginia
- Listed height: 6 ft 7 in (2.01 m)
- Listed weight: 210 lb (95 kg)

Career information
- High school: Meadowbrook (Chesterfield, Virginia)
- College: West Virginia (2001–2005)
- NBA draft: 2005: undrafted
- Playing career: 2005–2014
- Position: Small forward

Career history
- 2005–2006: Roanoke Dazzle
- 2006: Arkansas ArchAngels
- 2006–2007: Arkansas RimRockers
- 2007: Seoul Samsung Thunders
- 2008: Lovanio
- 2007–2008: Leuven Bears
- 2008–2009: Rotterdam Challengers
- 2009–2010: West-Brabant Giants
- 2010–2011: Oberwart Gunners
- 2011–2012: Rotterdam
- 2012–2013: Panthers Fürstenfeld
- 2013–2014: Musel Pikes

Career highlights
- Austrian League champion (2011); DBL scoring champion (2012); DBL All-Star (2012)

Tyrone Sally (born January 25, 1982) is an American retired basketball player. After playing college basketball for West Virginia, he played professionally in the NBA D-League and Europe. While playing with Rotterdam Basketbal, he was the DBL top scorer in the 2011–12 season. He now is the Head Basketball Coach at Alexandria City High School in Alexandria, VA.

== Honors and titles ==
=== Club ===
Oberwart Gunners

- Austrian Basketball Bundesliga: 2010–11
