= David Gonzalvez =

American basketball player

No. 12 – Tapiolan Honka
- Position: Shooting guard
- League: Korisliiga

Personal information
- Born: October 29, 1987 (age 39) Manhattan, New York
- Listed height: 1.93 m (6 ft 4 in)

Career information
- High school: Notre Dame Prep (Fitchburg, Massachusetts)
- College: Richmond (2006–2010)
- NBA draft: 2010: undrafted
- Playing career: 2010–present

Career history
- 2010: Nantes-Rezé
- 2011: Oberwart Gunners
- 2011–2012: Den Bosch
- 2012–2013: WBC Wels
- 2013–2014: Den Bosch
- 2014–2015: Namika Lahti
- 2015–2016: Kouvot
- 2016: Riesen Ludwigsburg
- 2017: Bayreuth
- 2017–2018: Rasta Vechta
- 2018–2020: Kouvot
- 2020–2022: Tampereen Pyrintö
- 2022–2023: Raholan Pyrkivä
- 2023–present: Tapiolan Honka

Career highlights
- ProA champion (2018); Korisliiga champion (2016); DBL champion (2012); ÖBL champion (2011); Dutch Supercup champion (2013); 2× DBL All-Star (2012, 2014); DBL steals leader (2012)

David Gonzalvez (born October 29, 1987) is an American professional basketball player for Tapiolan Honka in the Finnish Korisliiga. Standing at 1.93 m (6 ft 4 in), Gonzalvez usually plays at the shooting guard position. He played college basketball for the Richmond Spiders.

== Career ==
Gonzalvez played four years for the Richmond Spiders men's basketball team before turning professional in 2010. In his first season, he played for Nantes in the LNB Pro B in France and for the Oberwart Gunners from Austria. In the 2011–2012 season, he played for EiffelTowers Den Bosch from the Netherlands. With the team he won the Dutch national championship. In 2012, he signed with WBC Raiffeisen Wels. In 2013, he returned to Den Bosch to play for the team, that was renamed the SPM Shoeters, again.

For the 2014–15 season he signed with Namika Lahti of the Finnish Korisliiga. In October 2015, Gonzalvez signed with Kouvot in the same Korisliiga.

On July 19, 2016, Gonzalvez signed with the German club MHP Riesen Ludwigsburg.

On January 2, 2017, Gonzalvez transferred to medi bayreuth.

== Honors ==
SPM Shoeters Den Bosch

- Dutch Championship (2012)
- Dutch Supercup (2013)
- 2x DBL All-Star (2012, 2014)
- DBL steals leader (2012)

WBC Raiffeisen Wels

- Austrian Championship (2011)

Kouvot

- Korisliiga (2016)
