= Mitchel Berrenstein =

Dutch basketball player

Personal information
- Born: January 13, 1987 (age 39) Waalwijk, Netherlands
- Listed height: 1.96 m (6 ft 5 in)
- Position: Power forward

Career history
- 2006–2007: ABC Amsterdam

Mitchel Berrenstein (born January 13, 1987, in Waalwijk, Netherlands) is a Dutch former professional basketball player who last played for the Dutch Basketball League club ABC Amsterdam during the 2006-2007 season.
