= Tyler Tiedeman =

American basketball player

Personal information
- Born: April 26, 1985 (age 41) Santa Rosa, California
- Listed height: 6 ft 7 in (2.01 m)
- Listed weight: 210 lb (95 kg)

Career information
- High school: Montgomery (Santa Rosa, California)
- College: Santa Rosa JC (2004–2005); Boise State (2005–2008)
- NBA draft: 2008: undrafted
- Playing career: 2008–2013
- Position: Small forward

Career history
- 2008–2009: Bàsquet Mallorca
- 2010–2011: WCAA Giants
- 2011–2012: Lappeenrannan NMKY
- 2012–2013: WBC Raiffeisen Wels

Career highlights
- DBL All-Star (2011)

Tyler Tiedeman (born April 26, 1985) is an American former basketball player. Tiedeman played college basketball for the Boise State Broncos from 2005 until 2008 and played several years in Europe as a professional player until retirement from the sport in 2013.

== Career ==
Tiedeman grew up in Santa Rosa, California and attended Montgomery High School. He opted for baseball after leaving Montgomery, turning down a contract offer from the Atlanta Braves and accepting a scholarship at the University of Arizona, where he roomed with current Giants closing pitcher Mark Melancon. In his first season pitching at Tucson, though, he blew out his elbow. Tiedeman wound up having Tommy John surgery, effectively ending his baseball career. Tiedeman rededicated himself to basketball, spent one season at Santa Rosa Junior College, and committed to Boise State as a sophomore. During his first two seasons in Boise he roomed with current Los Angeles Laker Coby Karl, son of Denver Nuggets coach George Karl.

In 2008, Tiedeman signed his first professional basketball contract to play in Mallorca, Spain. In August 2010, Tiedeman signed with West-Brabant Giants, a club from Bergen op Zoom, Netherlands. He averaged 14.7 points in the 2010–11 season, and later extended his contract. Because the club eventually was dissolved because of financial problems, he signed with the Finnish team Lappeenrannan NMKY later.

Tiedeman signed with WBC Raiffeisen Wels from Wels, Austria for the 2012–13 season. He was second in scoring with 19.5 points and fifth with 4.1 assists per game in the ABL.

== Honors ==
(Netherlands) WCAA Giants

- DBL All-Star (1): 2011

== Statistics ==
Legend
GP	Games played	MPG	Minutes per game	FG%	Field goal percentage
3P%	3-point field goal percentage	FT%	Free throw percentage	RPG	Rebounds per game
APG	Assists per game	SPG	Steals per game	BPG	Blocks per game
PPG	Points per game	**Bold**	Career high		Led the league

=== Regular season ===
Year	Team	League	GP	MPG	FG%	3P%	FT%	RPG	APG	SPG	BPG	PPG	
2008–09	(Spain) Bàsquet Mallorca	LEB Oro	24		26.3	.429	.357	.712	2.6	1.3	0.9	0.2	10.3
2010–11	(Netherlands) WCAA Giants	DBL	34		27.9	.486	.359	.760	4.1	1.9	1.4	0.1	14.7
2011–12	(Finland) Lappeenrannan NMKY	Korisliiga	39		31.1	.473	.359	.820	4.7	2.2	0.6	0.2	17.6
2012–13	(Austria) WBC Raiffeisen Wels	ABL	28		34.4	.655	.453	.825	4.9	4.1	0.9	0.1	19.7

=== Playoffs ===
Year	Team	League	GP	MPG	FG%	3P%	FT%	RPG	APG	SPG	BPG	PPG	
2011	(Netherlands) WCAA Giants	DBL	3		29.7	.514	.313	.571	4.3	2.7	4.3	0.3	16.3
2012	(Finland) Lappeenrannan NMKY	Korisliiga	3		34.0	.500	.438	.824	5.3	2.7	0.3	0.3	20.3
2013	(Austria) WBC Raiffeisen Wels	ABL	2		17.5	.588	.333	1.000	3.0	1.5	0.0	0.0	12.5
