= 2006–07 Eredivisie (basketball) =

- League: Eredivisie
- Sport: Basketball

Regular season
- Top seed: EiffelTowers Den Bosch
- Season MVP: (United States) Leon Rodgers (EiffelTowers Den Bosch)
- Top scorer: (United States) Alhaji Mohammed (23.2) (Matrixx Magixx)

Finals
- Champions: EiffelTowers Den Bosch
- Runners-up: Matrixx Magixx

Dutch Basketball League seasons
- ← 2005–06 2007–08 →

The 2006–07 Eredivisie season was the 48th season of the Eredivisie in basketball, the highest professional basketball league in the Netherlands. EiffelTowers Den Bosch won their 14th national title.

== Regular season ==
Pos	Team	Pld	W	L	PF	PA	PD	Pts	Qualification or relegation
1	EiffelTowers Den Bosch	40	36	4	3666	3273	+393	72	Qualification for playoffs
2	Matrixx Magixx	40	26	14	3372	3252	+120	52	Qualification for playoffs
3	Hanzevast Capitals	40	25	15	3164	2962	+202	50	Qualification for playoffs
4	Rotterdam	40	24	16	3168	3026	+142	48	Qualification for playoffs
5	Upstairs Weert	40	20	20	3296	3312	−16	40	Qualification for playoffs
6	Amsterdam Astronauts	40	17	23	3122	3187	−65	34	Qualification for playoffs
7	Polynorm Giants	40	17	23	3054	3084	−30	34	Qualification for playoffs
8	ZZ Leiden	40	15	25	3051	3201	−150	30	Qualification for playoffs
9	Woon! Aris	40	14	26	3432	3589	−157	28	
10	Landstede	40	14	26	2924	3170	−246	28	
11	Omniworld Almere	40	12	28	3053	3246	−193	24	

Source: DBL

== Playoffs ==
Quarterfinals
1	EiffelTowers Den Bosch	2
8	ZZ Leiden	0
4	Rotterdam	0
5	Upstairs Weert	2
2	Matrixx Magixx	2
7	Polynorm Giants	0
3	Hanzevast Capitals	1
6	Amsterdam Astronauts	2

Semifinals
1	EiffelTowers Den Bosch	3
5	Upstairs Weert	2
2	Matrixx Magixx	3
6	Amsterdam Astronauts	2

Finals
1	EiffelTowers Den Bosch	4
2	Matrixx Magixx	0
