= Antoine Jordan =

American basketball player

Personal information
- Born: March 10, 1983 (age 43) Baltimore, Maryland, U.S.
- Listed height: 6 ft 5 in (1.96 m)
- Listed weight: 200 lb (91 kg)

Career information
- High school: Randallstown (Baltimore County, Maryland)
- College: Siena (2002–2006)
- NBA draft: 2006: undrafted
- Playing career: 2006–2014
- Position: Point guard / shooting guard

Career history
- 2006: Basket Livorno
- 2007: BC Šiauliai
- 2007: Fort Worth Flyers
- 2007: Albany Patroons
- 2007–2008: Matrixx Magixx
- 2008: Tulsa 66ers
- 2009: Matrixx Magixx
- 2010–2012: BG Göttingen
- 2012–2013: Kouvot Kouvola
- 2013–2014: Once Caldas de Manizales

Career highlights
- FIBA EuroChallenge champion (2010); All-Dutch League Team (2007)

Antoine "Scoop" Jordan (born March 10, 1983) is an American professional basketball player. Antoine attended Siena College and played as their point guard from 2002 to 2005. He has played overseas in Italy, the Netherlands, Israel, Lithuania and Germany. In 2010 Antoine signed with BG Goettingen. He has a wife and two kids that reside in Maryland.
