= Rans Brempong =

Canadian basketball player

Vancouver Bandits
- Position: Power forward
- League: CEBL

Personal information
- Born: July 22, 1981 (age 45) Thornhill, Ontario, Canada
- Listed height: 2.03 m (6 ft 8 in)
- Listed weight: 215 lb (98 kg)

Career information
- High school: Thornlea Secondary School
- College: Western Carolina (2000–2005)
- NBA draft: 2005: undrafted
- Playing career: 2005–present

Career history
- 2005–2007: Matrixx Magixx
- 2007–2008: Bayer Giants Leverkusen
- 2008–2009: Donar
- 2010–2011: Gloria Giants Düsseldorf
- 2018: St. John's Edge
- 2019: Fraser Valley Bandits

Career highlights
- Broke the Southern Conference's All Time Shot Block Record (NCAAD1); Dutch Cup winner (2007); DBL rebounding leader (2007); 3× DBL blocks leader (2006, 2007, 2009); 2× DBL All-Star (2007, 2009)

Ransford Sifah Brempong (born July 22, 1981) is a former Canadian National Team member and professional basketball player for the Fraser Valley Bandits of the Canadian Elite Basketball League (CEBL). He is currently the Lead Assistant Coach for the Bandits. Previously he was on the broadcasting team as the colour commentator for the team. He also runs his WCT Hoops basketball organization at the grassroots level. Continually providing opportunities for the next generation of basketball players in BC to reach their next level.

== Career ==
Brempong played college basketball for the Western Carolina Catamounts where he was a five year starter. While at WCU he broke his conferences' all time shot block record. He then went on to play professionally and played for Matrixx Magixx and Donar (then named Hanzevast Capitals for sponsorship reasons) in the Netherlands and Bayer Giants Leverkusen and Gloria Giants Düsseldorf in Germany.

In 2018, after being retired for six years Brempong joined the St. John's Edge of the National Basketball League of Canada (NBLC). He then went on to play for the Fraser Valley Bandits of the Canadian Elite Basketball League (CEBL) in 2019.

Brempong also spent nearly eight years playing for the Canadian National Team. He first made the Junior National Team in 2001 and eventually made his way up the ranks to the Senior Men's team where he competed for three summers. During this time Brempong had the opportunity to play with and against many basketball greats such as Kobe Bryant, Dwyane Wade, Chris Paul, Dirk Nowitzki, Yao Ming, Steve Nash, Carmelo Anthony, Kelly Olynyk, and Kevin Martin.

== Personal ==
Born in Winnipeg, Manitoba to parents from Ghana, west Africa, Brempong moved to Toronto in 1993 where he spent the rest of his elementary and high school days in Thornhill, Ontario. While in high school, he was selected his senior year as a Toronto Star top-5 player in the greater Toronto area. He spent five years in North Carolina where he went to Western Carolina University. In 2012, he was in a car accident where he broke his back. He spent the next four years doing extensive rehab before being able to make a full recovery and play basketball again six years later. Brempong currently lives in North Vancouver, British Columbia. He is married and has three children.
