= Daniel Faris =

Lebanese-American basketball player

Personal information
- Born: May 2, 1987 (age 39) Greenbrae, California, U.S.
- Listed height: 6 ft 9 in (2.06 m)

Career information
- High school: Eldorado (Albuquerque, New Mexico)
- College: New Mexico (2005–2009)
- NBA draft: 2009: undrafted
- Playing career: 2009–2019
- Position: Power forward
- Number: 53

Career history
- 2009–2010: West-Brabant Giants
- 2011–2015: Sagesse
- 2016–2019: Champville SC

Daniel Jonathan Faris (born 2 May 1987) is a Lebanese-American basketball player who last played in 2020 for Champville SC and Lebanon. He is a 2.06 m (6 ft 9 in) tall power forward-center.

== College career ==
Faris played four years of NCAA Division I basketball at the University of New Mexico. In his senior season, he averaged 12.1 points and 6.4 rebounds per game en route to being named to the All-Mountain West Conference second team.

== Professional career ==
After his college career, Daniel Faris played for the West-Brabant Giants, for sponsorship reasons WCAA Giants, in the Dutch Basketball League (DBL) for one year. In 2016, he signed with Champville SC in Lebanon.

== International career ==
Faris has also been a member of the Lebanon national basketball team. He competed with the senior team for the first time at the FIBA Asia Championship 2009, where he saw action in four games for the fourth-place Lebanese team.
