= Alhaji Mohammed =

Ghanaian-American basketball player

Personal information
- Born: October 29, 1981 (age 45) Chicago, Illinois, U.S.
- Listed height: 6 ft 4 in (1.93 m)
- Listed weight: 195 lb (88 kg)

Career information
- High school: Hillcrest (Cook County, Illinois)
- College: Louisville (2001–2004)
- NBA draft: 2004: undrafted
- Playing career: 2004–2021
- Position: Shooting guard

Career history
- 2004–2005: Idaho Stampede
- 2005–2007: Matrixx Magixx
- 2007: Paderborn Baskets
- 2007–2008: Matrixx Magixx
- 2008–2010: Limoges CSP
- 2010–2011: CE Lleida
- 2011: Towzin Electric Kashan
- 2011–2012: Al Kuwait
- 2012–2013: Blancos de Rueda Valladolid
- 2013–2015: CSU Asesoft Ploiești
- 2015: SLUC Nancy
- 2015: Sigal Prishtina
- 2015–2017: Mureș
- 2017–2018: Alba Fehérvár
- 2018–2019: U-BT Cluj-Napoca

Career highlights
- Hungarian League champion (2017); Hungarian Cup winner (2017); 2× Romanian League champion (2013, 2014); 2× Romanian League Finals MVP (2013, 2014); 2× Romanian League All-Star (2014, 2016); Kuwait Super Cup winner (2012); Dutch Cup winner (2007); DBL scoring champion (2007); DBL All-Star Game MVP (2007); 2× DBL All-Star (2006, 2007); First-team All-WSC (2000)

Alhaji Mohammed (born October 29, 1981) is an American-born Ghanaian former basketball player. A four-year college basketball player for Louisville, he started his 17-year long professional career in 2004.

== Career ==
From 2008 to 2010, Mohammed played with Limoges CSP of the French LNB Pro A and was inducted into the team's Hall of Fame.

For the 2014–15 season he chose to stay with his Romanian team Asesoft Ploiești. On February 13, he left the club by mutual agreement, making him a free agent. On February 26, 2015, he signed with SLUC Nancy Basket for the rest of the season.

On September 22, 2015, he signed with Sigal Prishtina. On November 17, 2015, he left Prishtina and moved to the Romanian club BC Mureș. On February 3, 2017, he left Mureș and signed with Hungarian club Alba Fehérvár.

In February, Mohammed signed in Tunisia with US Monastir. With Monastir, he was to play in the inaugural season of the Basketball Africa League. However, the season was cancelled due to the COVID-19 pandemic and Mohammed never joined Monastir.

In October 2021, he retired from basketball after making the announcement at his 40th birthday.

== Personal ==
Alhaji is one of 11 children born to parents Ayisha Ali and Alhaji T. Mohammed. His brother Nazr Mohammed is a famous player in the NBA for more the 15 years. In 2000 his dad was killed in his auto parts store in Chicago. On Alhaji right arm, he has tattooed the image of his father with the words "Flesh of my flesh/Blood of my blood" as a sign of love, respect and appreciation.
