= Thomas Gipson =

American basketball player

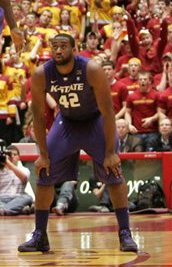
- Gipson with the Kansas State Wildcats in 2012

Free agent
- Position: Power forward

Personal information
- Born: January 11, 1993 (age 33) Dallas, Texas, U.S.
- Listed height: 6 ft 7 in (2.01 m)
- Listed weight: 265 lb (120 kg)

Career information
- High school: Cedar Hill (Cedar Hill, Texas)
- College: Kansas State (2011–2015)
- NBA draft: 2015: undrafted
- Playing career: 2015–present

Career history
- 2015–2016: Kouvot
- 2016: Halcones de Ciudad Obregón
- 2016: Élan Chalon
- 2016–2017: Khimik
- 2017: Correcaminos Colon
- 2017: Boulazac Dordogne
- 2017–2018: Kouvot
- 2018–2019: Karesispor
- 2019: Kouvot
- 2019–2020: Ciclista Olímpico
- 2020: Merkezefendi Bld. Denizli Basket
- 2021–2022: Dorados de Chihuahua
- 2022–2023: Ironi Ashkelon
- 2023: Dorados de Chihuahua
- 2023–2024: Kouvot

Career highlights
- Finnish League champion (2016)

Thomas Allen Gipson III (born January 11, 1993) is an American professional basketball player who last played for Kouvot of the Korisliiga. He played college basketball for the Kansas State Wildcats.

== College career ==
His father played basketball for Texas and his younger brother, Trevis, played college football at Tulsa. Gipson started 14 games as a sophomore at Kansas State and averaged 7.9 points and 5.0 rebounds per game on the Big 12 regular season co-champion. Over the summer he worked on slimming down and adding muscle. As a junior, Gipson posted 11.7 points and 6.5 rebounds per game. On August 13, 2014, he was arrested for speeding and driving with a revoked license. Coming into his senior year, he had shoulder surgery. As a senior, he averaged 11.3 points and 5.3 rebounds per game. He was a 1,000 point scorer at Kansas State. He was named co-winner of the Rolando Blackman Team Most Valuable Player award along with Nino Williams and received the Jack Hartman Top Defensive Player and Bob Boozer Courage awards.

== Professional career ==
After graduating from the university, Gipson was interested in the NBA and European professional teams but drew the attention of NFL teams. He trained with the Green Bay Packers in the spring of 2015 despite never playing competitive football before. “The main things I want to work on are my footwork and getting low and moving and blocking,” Gipson said. He gave up on the idea after figuring that climbing up to the NFL level would have taken at least two years of work.

In September 2015, Gipson became a professional basketball player in Europe after signing a one-year contract with the Finnish team Kouvot. Gipson averaged 13.2 points, 8.1 rebounds and 1.2 assists per game on the season. The Kouvot progressed to the finals where it faced Tampereen Pyrintö. In the fourth game, Gipson was ejected for kicking his feet at Joonas Cavén. The Kouvot won the Finnish Championship in 4–1 series.

After the end of the Finnish season in May, Gipson moved to the Mexican team Halcones de Ciudad Obregón. In September 2016 he moved to the French team, Élan Chalon and averaged 2.9 points and 3.4 rebounds in eight games. He was released by Élan Chalon in November and signed with the Ukrainian team BC Khimik. After a brief stay in Ukraine, in January 2017 Gipson joined Correcaminos Colon of the Panamanian league and averaged 8 points and 5.8 rebounds per game. He signed with the French team Boulazac Basket Dordogne on February 18. Gipson rejoined Kouvot in September, signing a one-year contract.

In January 2020, Gipson signed with Merkezefendi Belediyesi Denizli Basket of the Turkish Basketball First League. He missed the 2020–21 season due to COVID-19 restrictions. On June 15, 2021, Gipson signed with the Dorados de Chihuahua of the Liga Nacional de Baloncesto Profesional.

On December 10, 2024, Gipson departed Kouvot of the Korisliiga after spending five seasons with the team.

== The Basketball Tournament ==
Thomas Gipson played for Team Purple & Black in the 2018 edition of The Basketball Tournament. He scored 14 points and grabbed nine rebounds in the team's first-round loss to Atlanta Dirty South.
