= 2011–12 Dutch Basketball League =

Dutch Basketball League
- Season: 2011–12
- Dates: 8 October 2011–15 April 2012
- Teams: 8

Regular season
- Season MVP: (United States) Seamus Boxley

Finals
- Champions: EiffelTowers Den Bosch (15th title)
- Runners-up: ZZ Leiden

Statistical leaders
Points	(United States) Tyrone Sally	18.5

The 2011–12 Dutch Basketball League (DBL) was the 52nd season of the highest Dutch professional basketball league. The regular season started on 8 October 2011. EiffelTowers Den Bosch won its 15th national championship, after beating ZZ Leiden 4–1 in the Finals. Seamus Boxley received the Most Valuable Player award this season.

== Rules ==
This was the first season played with new rules about foreign players; all teams were allowed to have no more than four foreign players on their roster.

=== Foreign players ===
Aris Leeuwarden	(United States) Lance Jeter	(Nigeria) Manny Adako	(United States) Gerad Punch	(United States) Brandon Rozzell	(Mexico) Mark Sanchez	(United States) Clavin Chitwood
GasTerra Flames	(Suriname) Sergio de Randamie	(United States) Alex Wesby	(United States) Jason Dourisseau	(United States) David Bell	(United States) Avis Wyatt	
ZZ Leiden	(United States) Seamus Boxley	(United States) Thomas Jackson	(Canada) Jevohn Shepherd	(United States) Gabe Kennedy		
EiffelTowers Den Bosch	(United States) Frank Turner	(United States) Tai Wesley	(United States) David Gonzalvez			
Maxxcom BSW	(United States) DeMario Anderson	(United States) Robbie Harman	(United States) Yamene Coleman	(United States) Rahmon Fletscher	(United States) Donte Minter	
Rotterdam Basketbal	(United States) Tyrone Sally					
Magixx	(United States) Maurice Acker	(United States) Markel Humphrey	(United States) Kelvin Martin	(United States) Lucas Hargrove		
Landstede Basketbal	(United States) Damon Huffman	(Ghana) Amu Saaka	(United States) Cameron Wells	(United States) Kareem Maddox	(Israel) Ram Elias-Pour	

Source: Eurobasket

== Teams ==
Location of teams in the 2011–12 Dutch Basketball League

The league started with 8 teams in the 2011-12 season. WCAA Giants and ABC Amsterdam, quarterfinalist last year, didn't return because the clubs went bankrupt.

- EiffelTowers Den Bosch from 's-Hertogenbosch
- GasTerra Flames from Groningen
- Lasaulec Aris from Leeuwarden
- Zorg en Zekerheid Leiden from Leiden
- Magixx Playing for KidsRights from Nijmegen
- Rotterdam Basketbal College from Rotterdam
- Stepco BSW from Weert
- Landstede Basketbal from Zwolle

== Regular season ==
Pos	Team	Pld	W	L	PF	PA	PD	Pts	Qualification or relegation
1	ZZ Leiden	28	22	6	2100	1838	+262	44	Qualification for second stage
2	GasTerra Flames	28	21	7	2094	1923	+171	42	Qualification for second stage
3	EiffelTowers Den Bosch	28	21	7	2333	2015	+318	42	Qualification for second stage
4	Magixx Playing for KidsRights	28	17	11	2237	2201	+36	34	Qualification for second stage
5	Landstede	28	12	16	2039	2001	+38	24	Qualification for second stage
6	Lasaulec Aris	28	10	18	2176	2235	−59	20	Qualification for second stage
7	Stepco BSW	28	5	23	1969	2236	−267	10	
8	Rotterdam Basketbal College	28	4	24	1810	2309	−499	8	

Source: DBL

== Second stage ==
=== Group A ===
Pos	Team	Pld	W	L	PF	PA	PD	Pts	Qualification	ZZL	DBO	ARI
1	ZZ Leiden	4	3	1	312	293	+19	6	Advance to semifinals	—	78–77	82–72
2	EiffelTowers Den Bosch	4	2	2	319	305	+14	4	Advance to semifinals	89–65	—	92–71
3	Lasaulec Aris	4	1	3	289	322	−33	2		55–87	91–61	—

Source: DBL

=== Group B ===
Pos	Team	Pld	W	L	PF	PA	PD	Pts	Qualification	GTF	LAN	MAG
1	GasTerra Flames	4	3	1	324	292	+32	6	Advance to semifinals	—	84–80	85–63
2	Landstede	4	2	2	324	336	−12	4	Advance to semifinals	63–78	—	95–94
3	Magixx Playing for KidsRights	4	1	3	323	343	−20	2		86–77	80–86	—

Source: DBL

== Playoffs ==
The two group winners from the second stage advanced to the playoffs. The semifinals were played in a best-of-five format, while the finals were played in a best-of-seven format. Home advantage was decided by the regulars season seeds of the teams. The home team in each series alternated each game.

Semi-finals
1 ZZ Leiden	76	76	63	62
5 Landstede	63	72	69	43
2 GasTerra Flames	67	54	72	74	73
3 EiffelTowers Den Bosch	54	80	49	81	74

Final
1 ZZ Leiden	79	70	74	70	61
3 EiffelTowers Den Bosch	81	85	77	65	65

== Awards ==
Most Valuable Player
- (United States) Seamus Boxley (ZZ Leiden)

All-Star Team

- (United States) Thomas Jackson (ZZ Leiden)
- (United States) Alex Wesby (GasTerra Flames)
- (United States) Markel Humphrey (Magixx)
- (United States) Seamus Boxley (ZZ Leiden)
- (United States) Tai Wesley (EiffelTowers)

Statistical Player of the Year

- (United States) Tai Wesley (EiffelTowers)

MVP Under 23

- (Netherlands) Thomas Koenis (GasTerra Flames)

Rookie of the Year

- (Netherlands) Valentijn Lietmeijer (Lasaulec Aris)

Most Improved Player

- (Netherlands) Leon Williams (Rotterdam Basketbal)

Coach of the Year

- (Netherlands) Toon van Helfteren (ZZ Leiden)

== In European competitions ==
Club	Competition	Result	W–L	Ref
GasTerra Flames	Eurocup	Regular season	0–6	
ZZ Leiden	EuroChallenge	Last 16	5–7	
Overall	EuroChallenge		5–13	
