= Oskari Laine =

Finnish farmer and politician (1859–1933)

Adolf Oskari Laine (5 May 1859 – 22 April 1933) was a Finnish farmer and politician, born in Mäntsälä. He was a member of the Diet of Finland in 1899, in 1900, from 1904 to 1905 and from 1905 to 1906 and of the Parliament of Finland from 1907 to 1913, representing the Finnish Party.
