= Leon Rodgers =

American-Venezuelan basketball player (born 1980)

Personal information
- Born: June 19, 1980 (age 46) Columbus, Ohio, U.S.
- Listed height: 6 ft 5.5 in (1.97 m)
- Listed weight: 216 lb (98 kg)

Career information
- High school: Eastmoor Academy (Columbus, Ohio)
- College: Northern Illinois (1998–2002)
- NBA draft: 2002: undrafted
- Playing career: 2002–2017
- Position: Small forward

Career history
- 2002–2003: Brandt Hagen
- 2003–2004: Orléans Loiret
- 2004–2005: EiffelTowers Nijmegen
- 2005–2007: EiffelTowers Den Bosch
- 2007–2008: Artland Dragons
- 2008–2010: Jilin Northeast Tigers
- 2010: Leones de Ponce
- 2010–2011: Shanxi Zhongyu
- 2011: Ohio Hidden Gems
- 2011–2012: Marinos
- 2011–2012: Titanes del Licey
- 2012–2013: Marinos
- 2013: Guerreros de Bogotá
- 2013: Jilin Northeast Tigers
- 2014: Barangay Ginebra San Miguel
- 2014: Marinos
- 2016–2017: Guaros de Lara
- 2017: Marinos

Career highlights
- CBA three-point leader (2008); 3× Eredivisie MVP (2005–2007); German Cup champion (2008); LPB champion (2012)

Leon Rodgers (born June 19, 1980) is an American-born Venezuelan retired basketball player. Standing at 6 ft 5.5 in (1.97 m), he played as small forward. Over his career, Rodgers played in the Netherlands, China, France, Germany, Puerto Rico, Philippines and Colombia. He was nicknamed "La Moto" during his time in Venezuela.

== Professional career ==
Rodgers started his professional career in 2002 with Brandt Hagen.

He played in the Netherlands for EiffelTowers Nijmegen and EiffelTowers Den Bosch from 2004 to 2007. He averaged 21.0 points, 8.3 rebounds and 3.0 assists over his three seasons in the Eredivisie.

During his time in the Netherlands, he won the Most Valuable Player award of the Dutch Basketball League three times in a row, tying the record of Kees Akerboom.

== Personal ==
Rodgers became a naturalised Venezuelan citizen in 2016.

== Honours ==
=== Club ===
EiffelTowers Den Bosch

- 2× Eredivisie: (2006, 2007)

Artland Dragons

- BBL-Pokal: (2008)

Marinos de Anzoátegui

- Liga Profesional de Baloncesto: (2012)

=== Individual ===
- 3× Eredivisie Most Valuable Player (2005, 2006, 2007)
- 3× First-team All-Eredivisie: (2005, 2006, 2007)
- 2× Eredivisie All-Star: (2005, 2007)
- Eredivisie Statistical Player of the Year: (2007)
