= Seamus Boxley =

American basketball player (born 1982)

Personal information
- Born: September 21, 1982 (age 44) Mountlake Terrace, Washington, U.S.
- Listed height: 6 ft 7 in (2.01 m)
- Listed weight: 220 lb (100 kg)

Career information
- High school: Mountlake Terrace (Mountlake Terrace, Washington)
- College: Portland State (2000–2005)
- NBA draft: 2005: undrafted
- Playing career: 2005–2016
- Position: Power forward
- Number: 10, 16, 21

Career history
- 2005: Portland Chinooks
- 2005–2006: Tulsa 66ers
- 2006–2007: Matrixx Magixx
- 2007–2008: Gießen 46ers
- 2008–2012: ZZ Leiden
- 2012–2013: Oberwart Gunners
- 2013–2014: Goverla
- 2014–2015: Limburg United
- 2015–2016: Spirou Charleroi

Career highlights
- Dutch League MVP (2012); ÖBL Most Valuable Player (2013); Dutch League champion (2011); 3× Dutch Cup winner (2007, 2010, 2012); Dutch Supercup winner (2011); 2× All-DBL Team (2011–2012); 4× DBL All-Star (2009–2012); Big Sky Player of the Year (2005); 2× Big Sky Defensive Player of the Year (2004, 2005); 2× First-team All-Big Sky (2004, 2005)

Seamus Boxley (born September 21, 1982) is an American former professional basketball player. Boxley played the power forward position. He played college basketball for Portland State, and after that spent time playing professionally in the Netherlands, Germany, Austria, Ukraine and Belgium.

== Career ==
On July 2, 2013, Boxley signed with BC Goverla. His contract was dissolved in March 2014 because of the 2014 Ukrainian revolution.

For the 2014–15 season Boxley signed with the newly formed Belgian team Limburg United. On March 24, 2015, he extended his contract with Limburg for one more season. However at the end of the season he left Limburg. On July 8, 2015, he signed a one-year deal with Spirou Charleroi.

After the 2015–16 season, Boxley retired.

== Honours ==
=== Club ===
Matrixx Magixx

- NBB Cup (1): 2006–07

ZZ Leiden

- Dutch Basketball League: 2010–11
- NBB Cup (2): 2009–10, 2011–12
- Dutch Supercup: 2011

=== Individual ===
ZZ Leiden

- DBL Most Valuable Player: 2011–12
- DBL All-Star Team (2): 2010–11, 2011–12
- DBL All-Star (4): 2009, 2010, 2011, 2012

Oberwart Gunners

- ÖBL Most Valuable Player: 2012–13

== Career statistics ==
Legend
| GP | Games played | MPG | Minutes per game | FG% | Field goal percentage |
| 3P% | 3-point field goal percentage | FT% | Free throw percentage | RPG | Rebounds per game |
| APG | Assists per game | SPG | Steals per game | BPG | Blocks per game |
| PPG | Points per game | **Bold** | Career high | | Led the league |

| † | Denotes seasons in which Boxley won the championship |
| * | Led the league |

=== Domestic leagues ===
| Year | Team | League | GP | GS | MPG | FG% | 3P% | FT% | RPG | APG | SPG | BPG | PPG |
|---|---|---|---|---|---|---|---|---|---|---|---|---|---|
| 2008–09 | ZZ Leiden | DBL | 34 | | 34.4 | .473 | .276 | .632 | 6.8 | 2.4 | 1.1 | 0.6 | 13.6 |
| 2009–10 | ZZ Leiden | DBL | 31 | | 34.0 | .552 | .261 | .686 | 6.9 | 2.6 | 0.9 | **1.1** | 16.6 |
| 2010–11† | ZZ Leiden | DBL | 35 | | 33.4 | **.564** | **.366** | .665 | 6.3 | 2.5 | **1.0** | 0.7 | 15.7 |
| 2011–12 | ZZ Leiden | DBL | **40** | | 32.6 | .506 | .208 | .711 | 6.6 | 2.3 | 0.9 | 0.8 | 14.8 |
| 2012–13 | Oberwart Gunners | ÖBL | 32 | | **35.2** | .555 | .266 | **.758** | 6.7 | **3.0** | 0.9 | 0.7 | **18.6** |
| 2013–14 | Goverla | SuperLeague | 17 | | 32.8 | .519 | .146 | .694 | **7.8** | 2.2 | 0.9 | 0.4 | 13.2 |
