= Markel Humphrey =

American basketball player (born 1987)

BBC Monthey
- Position: Small forward / shooting guard
- League: Swiss Basketball League

Personal information
- Born: November 21, 1987 (age 38) Atlanta, Georgia
- Listed height: 6 ft 6 in (1.98 m)
- Listed weight: 215 lb (98 kg)

Career information
- High school: Stockbridge (Stockbridge, Georgia)
- College: Marshall (2005–2009)
- NBA draft: 2009: undrafted
- Playing career: 2009–present

Career history
- 2009–2012: Matrixx Magixx
- 2012–2013: JSA Bordeaux
- 2013–2014: Saint-Quentin
- 2014–2015: AMSB
- 2015–2016: Lions de Genève
- 2016–2018: Monthey
- 2018–2020: Lions de Genève
- 2020–2021: Union Neuchâtel
- 2021–2022: Lugano Tigers
- 2022–present: BBC Monthey

Career highlights
- All-DBL Team (2012); 2× DBL All-Star (2010, 2011); DBL All-Star Game MVP (2011)

Markel Humphrey (born November 21, 1987) is an American basketball player who plays for BBC Monthey of the Swiss Basketball League. He usually plays as small forward or shooting guard.

== Professional career ==
In 2009 Humphrey signed with Matrixx Magixx, a team based in Nijmegen, Netherlands. He extended his contract after his first season. Humphrey also returned for a third season with Magixx.

He signed with JSA Bordeaux Basket, a team from the LNB Pro B for the 2012–13 season.

In May 2013 he signed with Saint-Quentin, another team from the Pro B.

Since 2015, Humphrey plays in Switzerland where he has played for Lions de Genève, BBC Monthey and Union Neuchâtel. He spent the 2019–20 season with Lions de Genève and averaged 14.1 points, 6.8 rebounds, 2.4 assists and 1.1 steals per game, earning Eurobasket.com All-Swiss SBL Co-Defensive Player of the Year honors. On October 1, 2020, Humphrey signed with Union Neuchâtel.

== Honors ==
Matrixx Magixx

- All-DBL Team: 2011–12
- DBL All-Star (2): 2010, 2011
- DBL All-Star Game MVP: 2011
