= Valentijn Lietmeijer =

Dutch basketball player

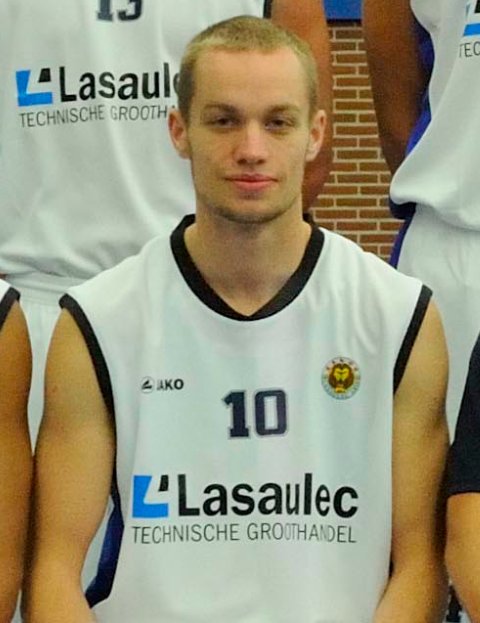
- Lietmeijer with Aris Leeuwarden in 2011

Personal information
- Born: 8 May 1991 (age 35) Groningen, Netherlands
- Listed height: 1.91 m (6 ft 3 in)

Career information
- Playing career: 2010–2018
- Position: Shooting guard / point guard

Career history
- 2010–2011: GasTerra Flames
- 2011–2013: Aris Leeuwarden
- 2013–2015: Landstede Zwolle
- 2015–2017: Den Bosch
- 2017–2018: Aris Leeuwarden

Career highlights
- DBL Rookie of the Year (2012); Dutch Supercup champion (2015); Dutch Cup champion (2016)

Valentijn Lietmeijer (born 8 May 1991) is a retired Dutch professional basketball player.

== Career ==
Lietmeijer's first professional club was Gasterra Flames from his hometown Groningen. After being named Dutch Basketball League Rookie of the Year, he left the club and joined Aris Leeuwarden.

On 9 August 2013 Lietmeijer signed with Landstede Basketbal. On 16 April 2014 he scored a franchise record 10 three-point field goals, scoring 34 points in a home game against Challenge Sports Rotterdam.

On 23 June 2015, he signed a three-year deal with SPM Shoeters Den Bosch.

On 2 August 2017, Lietmeijer returned to Aris Leeuwarden.

After another year with injuries Lietmeijer decided to quit professional basketball in June 2018.
