= Darnell Hinson =

American basketball player (born 1980)

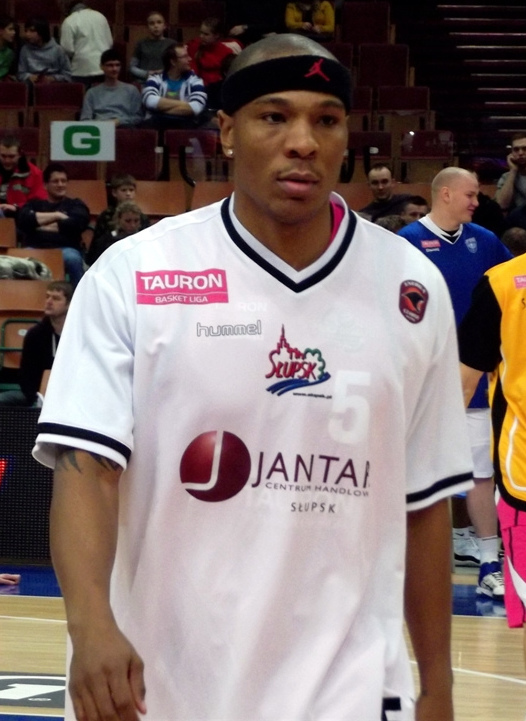
- Hinson with Czarni Słupsk in January 2012

Personal information
- Born: May 28, 1980 (age 46) Muskogee, Oklahoma, U.S.
- Listed height: 6 ft 1 in (1.85 m)
- Listed weight: 184 lb (83 kg)

Career information
- High school: Muskogee (Muskogee, Oklahoma)
- College: Northeastern State (2000–2004)
- NBA draft: 2004: undrafted
- Playing career: 2004–2017
- Position: Point guard
- Number: 5, 6, 8, 11

Career history
- 2004–2005: USC Freiburg
- 2005–2006: Landstede Zwolle
- 2006–2007: Hanzevast Capitals
- 2007–2008: West Sydney Razorbacks
- 2008: Vaqueros de Bayamón
- 2008–2009: Perth Wildcats
- 2009: Limoges CSP
- 2010: Gallitos de Isabela
- 2010–2011: Polonia Warszawa
- 2011: B-Meg Llamados
- 2011: Gallitos de Isabela
- 2011–2012: Czarni Słupsk
- 2012–2013: Oberwart Gunners
- 2013: Brujos de Guayama
- 2013: Titanes del Licey
- 2013–2014: Krasny Oktyabr
- 2014: Zepter Vienna
- 2014–2017: Brujos de Guayama

Career highlights
- All-DBL Team (2006); 2× DBL All-Star (2006, 2007); All-NBL Third Team (2008)

Darnell Hinson (born May 28, 1980) is an American former professional basketball player. Standing at 6 ft 1 in (1.85 m), Hinson played as point guard. He played four years in college with Northeastern State University, before starting an extensive professional career in Europe and South America.

== Career ==
Darnell Hinson was a star point guard at Muskogee High School (Oklahoma) before playing for the Northeastern State University Redmen (now RiverHawks) from 2000 to 2004.

Following the 2003–04 season, he was named an NCAA Division II All-American. In the 2002–03 season, he was awarded Player of the Game in the Championship Final Game against Kentucky Wesleyan. During his career with Northeastern State University in Oklahoma, Hinson became the all-time leading scorer for the university with 1,498 points.

Hinson became Northeastern State's all-time leading scorer with 1,498 points. Hinson, who came to NSU as a walk-on, was the 2003 NCAA-II Elite Eight Tournament's Most Outstanding Player where he made 16 of 25 field goals (.640), 8-of-12 treys (.667), had 15 rebounds, 12 assists, two blocks and a steals during the tourney.

As a senior, Hinson averaged 23.6 points per game by hitting 52.8 percent of his field goals (186-of-352), .457 from behind the arc (69 of 151), 112 rebounds, 75 assists, 11 blocks and 50 steals from the guard position. He earned NABC All-America honors in 2004. He had six games where he scored 30 or more points, including a 46-point effort against Southwestern Oklahoma State. Hinson was a two-time All-LSC North selection and was the 2004 LSC North Player of the Year.

Muskogeean Darnell Hinson was among four Northeastern State Redmen selected to the Lone Star Conference's 75th anniversary basketball team.

Hinson is joined on the team by Redmen coach Larry Gipson, who led Hinson and the 2002–03 team to the NCAA Division II national championship, the first-ever basketball title for the LSC in this division. He is a five-time North Division Coach of the Year selection, won an unprecedented five consecutive LSC North titles, and has led NSU to four NCAA Tournament appearances and one appearance in the Elite Eight.

In 2003, Hinson started playing basketball in Europe, first for USC Freiburg in Germany where he led his team in scoring at 20.2 ppg while shooting 40% from the three-point line. The year after he moved to the Netherlands, where he played for Landstede Zwolle in 2005/2006 and Hanzevast Capitals in 2006/2007. He made the all-defensive team, and made the All-Star Gala North team and won All-Eredivisie 1st Team and guard of the year.

In the 07/08 season for the West Sydney Razorbacks in the NBL, Hinson was in the top 10 for scoring averaging 20.9 ppg, top 20 in assists averaging 4.1 apg and is second in the league for steals averaging 2 spg.

On May 28, 2008, the Perth Wildcats announced that they had signed Hinson to a 3-year deal. However, in 2009 he joined CSP Limoges (French Pro B), one of the most popular French basketball teams.

He played for the B-Meg Llamados as there import. During the 2012–13 season, he played in the Österreichische Basketball Bundesliga for the Oberwart Gunners.

In 2013, he signed with Krasny Oktyabr. On March 4, 2014, he was released by the Russian club.

On August 3, 2015, Hinson signed with Zepter Vienna of Austria. On October 15, 2014, he parted ways with Vienna after appearing in three games.
