= 2010–11 Dutch Basketball League =

51st season of the Dutch Basketball League

- Season: 2010–11
- Teams: 10

Regular season
- Season MVP: (United States) Jason Dourisseau

Finals
- Champions: ZZ Leiden; 2nd title
- Runners-up: GasTerra Flames

Statistical leaders
Points	(United States) Glenn Stokes	16.7

The 2010–11 Dutch Basketball League season was the 51st season of the Dutch Basketball League, the highest professional basketball league in the Netherlands. Zorg en Zekerheid Leiden won the national championship by beating GasTerra Flames 4–3 in the finals. The season was decided in game seven in the Vijf Meihal in Leiden. After three overtimes, Leiden won the championship over the Flames.

== Teams ==
Key
▲	Increased capacity compared to previous year
	Champions after last years Playoffs
	Runners-up in last years Playoffs
	Semifinalists in last years Playoffs
	Quarterfinalists in last years Playoffs

All teams from the 2009–10 season played again this season.

Team	City	Arena	Cap.	2009–10	Head coach
ABC Amsterdam	Amsterdam	Sporthallen Zuid	3,000	7th	Hakim Salem
World Class Aviation Academy Giants	Bergen op Zoom	Sporthal Boulevard	900	2nd	Wierd Goedee
EiffelTowers Den Bosch	's-Hertogenbosch	Maaspoort	2,800	3rd	Raoul Korner
GasTerra Flames	Groningen	Martiniplaza	4,300	1st	Marco van den Berg
Rotterdam Challengers	Rotterdam	Topsportcentrum Rotterdam	2,400	10th	Zlatko Jezerkic
De Friesland Aris	Leeuwarden	Sporthal Kalverdijkje	800	6th	Pete Miller
Zorg en Zekerheid Leiden	Leiden	Vijf Meihal	▲2,000	5th	Toon van Helfteren
Upstairs Weert	Weert	Sporthal Boshoven	–	8th	Terence Stansbury
Matrixx Magixx	Nijmegen	De Horstacker	1,200	4th	Michael Schuurs
Landstede Basketbal	Zwolle	Landstede Sportcentrum	1,200	9th	Herman van den Belt

== Regular season ==
Pos	Team	Pld	W	L	PF	PA	PD	Pts	Qualification or relegation
1	ZZ Leiden	36	30	6	2774	2376	+398	60	Qualification for playoffs
2	GasTerra Flames	36	29	7	2882	2396	+486	58	Qualification for playoffs
3	EiffelTowers Den Bosch	36	26	10	2834	2468	+366	52	Qualification for playoffs
4	Magixx Playing for KidsRights	36	22	14	2685	2621	+64	44	Qualification for playoffs
5	De Friesland Aris	36	17	19	2739	2889	−150	34	Qualification for playoffs
6	WCAA Giants	36	16	20	2841	2784	+57	32	Qualification for playoffs
7	BSW	36	16	20	2674	2704	−30	32	Qualification for playoffs
8	ABC Amsterdam	36	13	23	2372	2561	−189	26	Qualification for playoffs
9	Landstede	36	10	26	2484	2813	−329	20	
10	Rotterdam	36	1	35	2307	2980	−673	2	

Source: DBL

== Playoffs ==
Quarterfinals
1	ZZ Leiden	2
8	ABC Amsterdam	0
4	Magixx KidsRights	2
5	De Friesland Aris	1
3	EiffelTowers Den Bosch	2
6	WCAA Giants	1
2	GasTerra Flames	2
7	BSW	1

Semifinals
1	ZZ Leiden	3
4	Magixx KidsRights	1
3	EiffelTowers Den Bosch	2
2	GasTerra Flames	3

Finals
1	ZZ Leiden	4
2	GasTerra Flames	3

== Awards ==
Most Valuable Player
- (United States) Jason Dourisseau (GasTerra Flames)

All-Star Team

- (United States) Frank Turner (EiffelTowers)
- (United States) Jason Dourisseau (GasTerra Flames)
- (United States) Julien Mills (EiffelTowers)
- (United States) Seamus Boxley (ZZ Leiden)
- (United States) Matt Haryasz (GasTerra Flames)

Statistical Player of the Year

- (United States) Julien Mills (EiffelTowers)

MVP Under 23

- (Netherlands) Jessey Voorn (ABC Amsterdam)

Rookie of the Year

- (Netherlands) Craig Osaikhwuwuomwam (ABC Amsterdam)

Most Improved Player

- (Netherlands) Worthy de Jong (ZZ Leiden)

Coach of the Year

- (Netherlands) Toon van Helfteren (ZZ Leiden)

== All-Star Game ==
=== Team North ===
Pos.	Player	Team
Starters
G	(United States) Robby Bostain	Groningen
G	(United States) Matt Bauscher	Groningen
F	(United States) Jason Dourisseau	Groningen
F	(United States) Seamus Boxley	Leiden
C	(United States) Matt Haryasz	Groningen
Substitutes
G	(Netherlands) Dimeo van der Horst	Amsterdam
G	(Netherlands) Jessey Voorn	Amsterdam
F	(Suriname) Sergio De Randamie	Amsterdam
F	(United States) Monta McGhee	Leiden
F	(United States) Mark Sanchez	Leeuwarden
C	(Canada) Ross Bekkering	Leiden
Coach: Marco van den Berg (Groningen)

=== Team South ===
Pos.	Player	Team
Starters
G	(United States) Jesse Kimbrough	Bergen op Zoom
G	(Netherlands) Kees Akerboom	Den Bosch
F	(United States) Markel Humphrey *	Nijmegen
F	(United States) Tim Blue	Bergen op Zoom
C	(United States) Brandon Griffin	Bergen op Zoom
Substitutes
G	(United States) Glenn Stokes	Weert
G	(United States) Julien Mills	Den Bosch
F	(United States) Tyler Tiedeman	Bergen op Zoom
F	(Netherlands) Stefan Wessels	Den Bosch
C	(Netherlands) Marcel Aarts	Den Bosch
Coach: Herman van den Belt (Zwolle)
