= Matrixx Magixx =

- Leagues: Dutch Basketball League
- Founded: 2005
- Dissolved: 2014
- History: List: Matrixx Magixx 2005–2010 Magixx playing for KidsRights 2010–2012 Matrixx Magixx 2012–2014
- Arena: De Horstacker (2005–2010); Sporthal De Arcus (2010–2014)
- Capacity: 700
- Location: Nijmegen, Netherlands (2005–2012); Wijchen, Netherlands (2012–2014)
- Championships: 1 NBB Cup
Home	Away

Matrixx Magixx was a professional basketball team based in Nijmegen and later Wijchen. The club played in the Dutch Basketball League (DBL), the Dutch top-tier league. Home games of the Magixx were played in Sporthal De Arcus since 2012, therefore De Horstacker was used. The long time main sponsor of the team was The Matrixx. In 2014, Magixx departed from the DBL after the club could not find funding.

Founded as a new team from Nijmegen after the departure of Nijmegen, the club played in the DBL for nine straight seasons. Its biggest success was the NBB Cup championship in 2006–07, when Magixx beat Donar in the final. In the 2011–12 season, Magixx finished as runners-up in the DBL.

== History ==
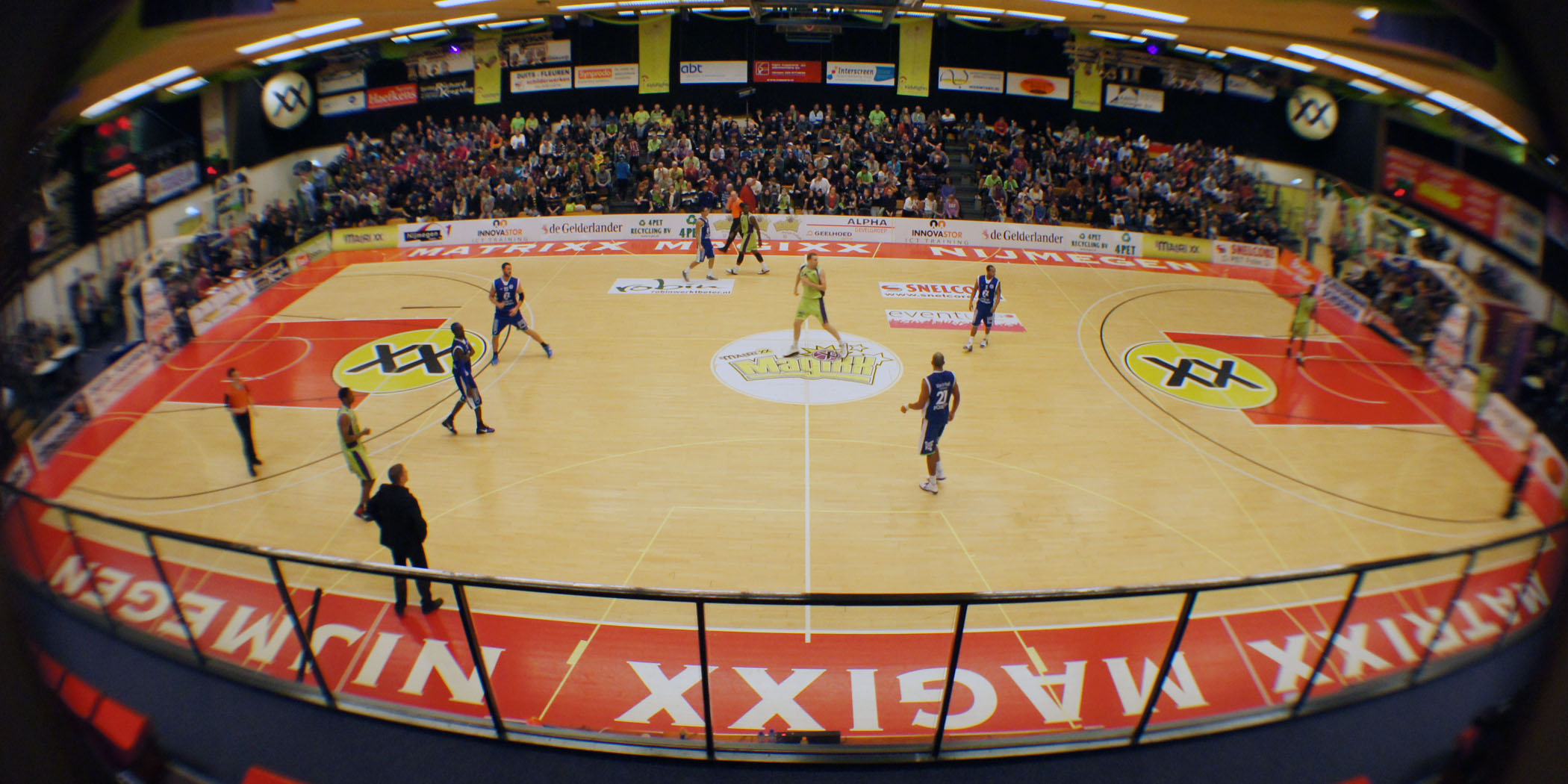
Magixx playing in the Horstacker, back in 2011

Magixx was founded after Eredivisie-team EiffelTowers Nijmegen left the city to merge with EBBC Den Bosch. Main reason was the small arena in Nijmegen, which didn't allow the club to play in European competitions.

After the departure of the EiffelTowers in 2005, Matrixx Magixx was founded. Main sponsor was club The Matrixx, and the club stayed in the Horstacker. In the first season as Matrixx Magixx, the club won the national NBB Cup and reached the Dutch finals. In the Finals the team would lose to EiffelTowers Den Bosch, the club that adopted Eiffel as its new main sponsor. The following years the team would not reach further than the quarterfinals of the play-offs.

In 2007 Magixx won the NBB Cup for the second time after defeating Donar in the final. In 2011 the team moved from Nijmegen to Wijchen, because the Horstacker didn't meet the requirements of the Magixx.

After the 2013–14 season, Magixx decided to leave the DBL. After long-time main sponsor The Matrixx ended its contract, Magixx did not have the financial means to sustain its professional team.

== Honours ==
- Dutch Basketball League
  - Runners-up (1): 2006–07
- Dutch Cups
  - Winners (1): 2006–07
    - Runners-up (1): 2011–12

== Season by season ==
Season	Tier	League	Pos.	NBB Cup	European competitions
2005–06	1	Eredivisie	6th		
2006–07	1	Eredivisie	2nd	Champion	
2007–08	1	Eredivisie	4th		
2008–09	1	Eredivisie	5th		
2009–10	1	Eredivisie	5th	Quarterfinalist	
2010–11	1	DBL	4th	Semifinalist	
2011–12	1	DBL	5th	Runner-up	
2012–13	1	DBL	7th	Quarterfinalist	
2013–14	1	DBL	6th	Quarterfinalist	

== Players ==
=== Notable players ===
Note: Flags indicate national team eligibility at FIBA-sanctioned events. Players may hold other non-FIBA nationalities not displayed.

Criteria

To appear in this section a player must have either:

- Set a club record or won an individual award while at the club
- Played at least one official international match for their national team at any time
- Played at least one official NBA match at any time.

- (Ghana) Alhaji Mohammed (1 season: 2005–06)
- (Canada) Ransford Brempong (2 seasons: 2005–07)
- (United States) Chris Copeland (2007–08)
- (Netherlands) Thijs Vermeulen (7 seasons: 2007–14)
- (United States) Mickell Gladness (1 season: 2008–09)
- (United States) Torey Thomas (1 season: 2009–10)
- (United States) Markel Humphrey (3 seasons: 2009–12)
- (United States) Patrick Richard (1 season: 2013–14)
- (United States) Antoine Jordan (2 seasons: 2007-09)

=== Individual award winners ===
All-DBL Team

- Ryan Sears – 2007
- Alhaji Mohammed – 2007
- Ransford Brempong – 2007
- Antoine Jordan – 2007
- Tyler Smith – 2007
- Markel Humphrey – 2012
- Patrick Richard – 2014
