= Amsterdam Basketball =

Amsterdam
- Founded: 21 July 1995
- Dissolved: 11 August 2011
- History: List: Finish Profiles Amsterdam (1995–1997) Ricoh Astronauts (1997–2003) Demon Astronauts (2003–2006) Amsterdam Astronauts (2006–2007) MyGuide Amsterdam (2007–2009) EclipseJet-MyGuide Amsterdam (2009–2010) ABC Amsterdam (2010–2011)
- Arena: Sporthallen Zuid
- Capacity: 3,000
- Location: Amsterdam, Netherlands
- Championships: 7 Dutch Leagues; 5 Dutch Cups
Home	Away

Amsterdam Basketball was a Dutch professional basketball club from the city of Amsterdam, established in 1995 and dissolved in 2011. The club won the Dutch championship seven times and the Dutch Cup five times.

== History ==
=== Early years (1995–1997) ===
After it was announced that the Graydons Canadians, a team from Amsterdam would not participate in the Eredivisie of 1995–96, Ed de Haas, Carlo Brunink and Oscar Kales founded the club. The club immediately started playing in the highest division in the Netherlands, and was named Finish Profiles Amsterdam after the new main sponsor. In the first season Tyrone Marionneaux was the head coach and Finish Profiles ended on a 9th place.

In the 1996–97 Jan Willem Jansen became head coach and new players like Mario Bennes were acquired, which led to the team winning the NBB Cup and reaching the league Finals. The club also played for the first season with the name Amsterdam Astronauts, which referred to the home arena of the club, the Apollohal.

=== First European games and Dutch titles (1997–2002) ===
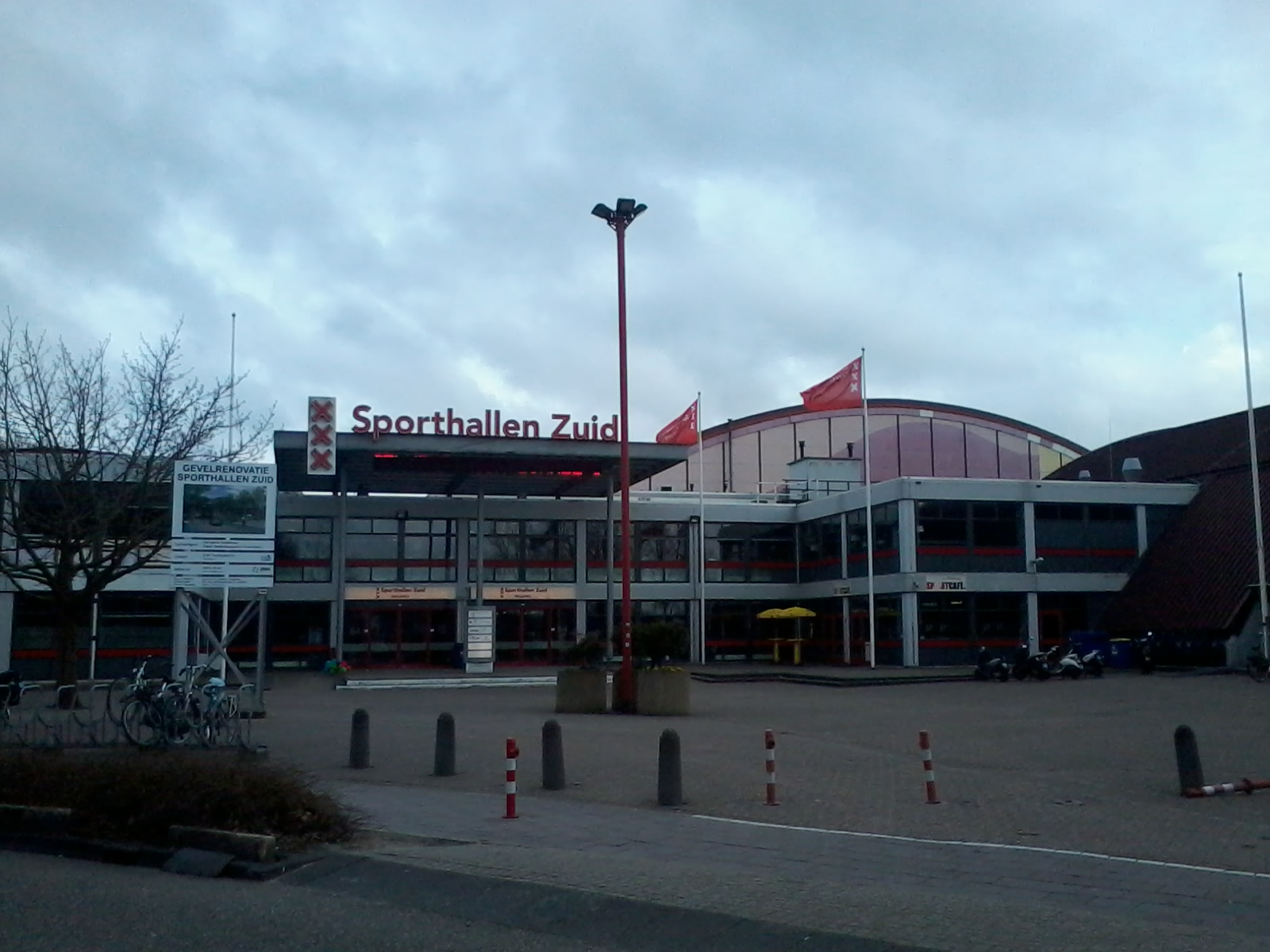
Sporthallen Zuid, home arena of Amsterdam

In 1997–98 the club debuted in Europe and started a second team, that would play in the Promotiedivisie. From that point some good years for the club began, as one of the all-time great coaches in Dutch basketball history Ton Boot started coaching the team. In the 1998–99 season the club won its first Dutch championship and reached the semifinals of the Korać Cup, in which it lost to Racing Basket Paris. In that semifinals the team played against later NBA All-Star Tony Parker. In the 2000–01 season the 3rd straight Dutch title was one. Before the 2001–02 season the club moved to Sporthallen Zuid, which had a capacity of 3,000. Another championship was won in the Sporthallen. The club had a tough season the following year, as newly formed EiffelTowers Nijmegen took the trophies.

=== Golden Years (2003–2009) ===
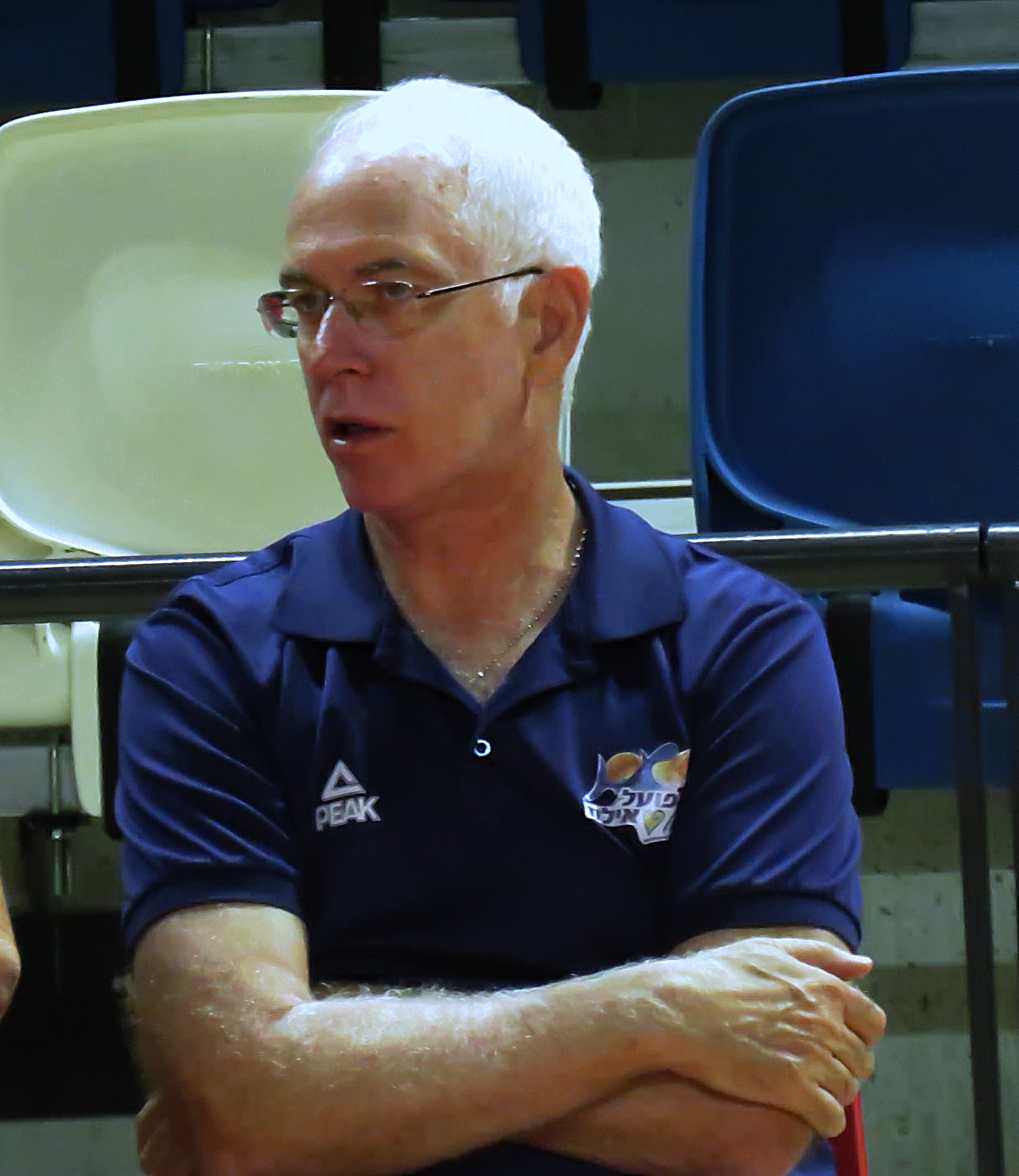
Arik Shivek coached Amsterdam to three DBL titles

In the 2003–04, season Israeli head coach Arik Shivek became head coach of Amsterdam, and some memorable players were acquired in Joe Spinks, Mario Bennes (who played earlier with the club), Chris McGuthrie and Teddy Gipson. The club also got a new main sponsor in Demon and was renamed Demon Astronauts. In 2004–05, the fifth national title was won, after Amsterdam beat Landstede Basketbal 4–0 in the Finals.

In 2005–06 and 2006–07, Amsterdam played as the Amsterdam Astronauts and ended in the 2nd and 6th places in the Eredivisie.

In May 2007, businessman Roel Pieper got the job of chairman of the club. MyGuide became the new main sponsor of the club. In 2008–09 and 2009–10, the club won their sixth and seventh titles, both by beating EiffelTowers Den Bosch 4–3 in the Finals. Also, captain Peter van Paassen won the league MVP award in both seasons.

Even though Amsterdam won their 2009 title on May 31, they had to wait till June 15 to officially get their title. Amsterdam player Orien Greene had used cannabis, but because the letter to inform the club never arrived the club got to keep their title.

To add to the turmoil, both main sponsors of the club (MyGuide and Eclipse-Jet) went bankrupt, so the team played without a sponsor in the 2009–10 season.

=== Rebuilding and disappearance (2009–2011) ===
The team was renamed ABC Amsterdam. The team, led by domestic players as DBL All-Stars Jessey Voorn, Dimeo van der Horst and Ramon Siljade did manage to reach the Playoffs in the 2009–10 and 2010–11 seasons.

The team was dissolved on August 11, 2011, after it couldn't find a main sponsor that was willing to invest enough money to keep the club in the DBL. For the first time since the foundation of the Eredivisie, no team from Amsterdam played in the league. In the 2012–13 season, BC Apollo entered as new team from Amsterdam.

== Sponsorships names ==
- 1995–1997: Finish Profiles Amsterdam
- 1997–2003: Ricoh Astronauts
- 2003–2006: Demon Ricoh Astronauts
- 2006–2007: Amsterdam Astronauts
- 2007–2009: MyGuide Amsterdam
- 2009–2010: EclipseJet-MyGuide Amsterdam
- 2010–2011: ABC Amsterdam

== Honours ==
=== Domestic competitions ===
Dutch League

- Winners (7): 1998–99, 1999–00, 2000–01, 2001–02, 2004–05, 2007–08, 2008–09

Dutch Cup

- Winners (5): 1996–97, 1997–98, 1998–99, 2003–04, 2005–06

=== European competitions ===
FIBA Korać Cup

- Semi-finalist (1): 2000-01

== Season by season ==
Season	Tier	League	Pos.	Dutch Cup	European competitions	
1995–96	1	Eredivisie	9th			
1996–97	1	Eredivisie	2nd	Winner	3 Korać Cup	R1
1997–98	1	Eredivisie	3rd	Winner	3 Korać Cup	
1998–99	1	Eredivisie	1st	Winner	3 Korać Cup	
1999–00	1	Eredivisie	1st		2 Saporta Cup	L16
2000–01	1	Eredivisie	1st		3 Korać Cup	SF
2001–02	1	Eredivisie	1st		2 Saporta Cup	RS
2002–03	1	Eredivisie	3rd		2 ULEB Cup	RS
2003–04	1	Eredivisie	3rd	Winner		
2004–05	1	Eredivisie	1st		3 FIBA Europe League	L16
2005–06	1	Eredivisie	3rd	Winner	2 ULEB Cup	RS
2006–07	1	Eredivisie	4th		3 FIBA EuroCup	RS
2007–08	1	Eredivisie	1st	Runner-up		
2008–09	1	Eredivisie	1st	Runner-up	3 EuroChallenge	QF
2009–10	1	Eredivisie	7th	Runner-up	3 EuroChallenge	RS
2010–11	1	DBL	8th			

== Notable players ==
To appear in this section a player must have either: played at least one season for the club, set a club record or won an individual award while at the club, played at least one official international match for their national team at any time or performed very successfully during period in the club or at later/previous stages of his career.

- (United States) Chris McGuthrie (1998–2003)
- (United States) Joe Spinks (1998–2006)
- (United States) Tony Miller (2001–02, 2003–04)
- (Netherlands) Ramon Siljade (2005–11)
- (United States) Avis Wyatt (2007–09)
- (Netherlands) Stefan Wessels (2004–09)
- (Netherlands) Peter van Paassen (2005–09)
- (United States) Orien Greene (2008–09)
- (United States) Teddy Gipson (2003–06, 2007–09)
- (United States) Patrick Sanders (2010)
- (Netherlands) Jessey Voorn (2007–11)
- (Netherlands) Dimeo van der Horst (2007–11)
- (Suriname) Sergio de Randamie (2007–11)
