= West-Brabant Giants =

WCAA Giants
- Nickname: Giants
- Founded: 2003
- Dissolved: 2011
- Arena: Sporthal de Boulevard
- Capacity: 900
- Location: Bergen op Zoom, Netherlands
- Team colors: Maroon, White
- Website: westbrabantgiants.nl
Home	Away

West-Brabant Giants was a Dutch professional basketball club based in Bergen op Zoom. The club was established in 2003 and dissolved in 2011. The team played its games at Sporthal de Boulevard and its main colors were red and white.

== History ==
The club was established in 2003 and was called Fun 4 All, for sponsorship reasons. The club entered the Dutch Basketball League, and ended 10th in the regular season. The next season the club was named the Myleasecar Giants, and the team reached the play-offs for the first time in its history. From 2005 till 2007 the club had the name Polynorm Giants, in these seasons the Giants made the postseason once. In 2008 and 2009 the Giants were semi-finalist in the play-offs. In 2010 the club had its best season, under the name World Class Aviation Academy Giants the team reached the Dutch finals. In the best-of-seven play-off series the Giants lost 4-1 to the GasTerra Flames from Groningen. After a season in which the Giants were quarterfinalists, the club was dissolved on 9 September 2011 due to financial problems.

== Players ==
=== Notable players ===
Note: Flags indicate national team eligibility at FIBA-sanctioned events. Players may hold other non-FIBA nationalities not displayed.

Criteria

To appear in this section a player must have either:

- Set a club record or won an individual award while at the club
- Played at least one official international match for their national team at any time
- Played at least one official NBA match at any time.

- (Lebanon) Daniel Faris
- (Australia) Steve Leven
- (United States) Tyler Tiedeman
- (United States) Tim Blue
- (Netherlands) Bryan Defares
- (Netherlands) Thomas Koenis
- (Netherlands) Ties Theeuwkens
- (Netherlands) Arvin Slagter
- (Netherlands) Leon Williams
- (Cameroon) Gaston Essengué
- (Estonia) Reinar Hallik
- (Belgium) Domien Loubry
- (United States) Jordan Collins

== Head coaches ==
- (United States) Otis Loyd (2003–2004)
- (Belgium) Tony van den Bosch (2004–2007)
- (Netherlands) Erik Braal (2007–2011)

== Season by season ==
Season	Tier	League	Pos.	Dutch Cup
2003–04	1	DBL	10th	
2004–05	1	DBL	4th	
2005–06	1	DBL	9th	
2006–07	1	DBL	7th	
2007–08	1	DBL	3rd	
2008–09	1	DBL	4th	
2009–10	1	DBL	2nd	Semifinalist
2010–11	1	DBL	6th	Runner-up
