= DBL All-Star Gala =

Former basketball event

- Dutch Basketball League All Star Game
- Sport: Basketball
- Founded: 1971
- Folded: 2017
- No. of teams: 2
- Country: Netherlands

The Dutch Basketball League All-Star Gala was a yearly basketball event in the Netherlands, organised by the Federatie Eredivisie Basketball (FEB). During the event the yearly All-Star Game was played, which included the best players of a given DBL season. Additionally, a dunk Contest and three-point contest were also held at the event. Since the 2017–18 season, the event is no longer organised by the FEB.

== All-Star Game ==
The All-Star Game is played by two teams featuring the best players in the Dutch Basketball League, voted by fans in the Netherlands. From 2004 till 2013, the game was played between the North and the South, players from club in the north of the Netherlands play in the North team. For the 2014 All-Star Gala, a format in which foreign players and domestic players face each other was chosen.

=== List of games ===
Bold: Team that won the game. Numbers in brackets show the number of times the event was held in the city or arena.

Year	Date	Arena	City	Team	Score	Team	MVP
2017	February 19	Vijf Meihal (2)	Leiden (2)	DBL Stars	100–**109**	**Netherlands**	(Netherlands) Olaf Schaftenaar
2016	February 28	Vijf Meihal	Leiden	DBL Stars	98–**100**	**Netherlands**	(Netherlands) Worthy de Jong
2015	February 22	Maaspoort (2)	Den Bosch (2)	DBL Stars	125–**127**	**Netherlands**	(Netherlands) Jeroen van der List (2)
2014	February 23	KingsDome (2)	Den Helder (3)	International	122–123	**National**	(Netherlands) Jeroen van der List
2013	February 24	Kingsdome	Den Helder (2)	North	118–**129**	**South**	(Netherlands) Stefan Wessels
2012	February 26	Landstede Sportcentrum (2)	Zwolle (2)	North	107–**113**	**South**	(United States) Frank Turner
2011	March 13	Landstede Sportcentrum	Zwolle	North	84–**105**	**South**	(United States) Markel Humphrey
2010	April 11	Apollohal (10)	Amsterdam (12)	North	103–**105**	**South**	(Netherlands) Kees Akerboom, Jr.
2009	April 5	Sporthallen Zuid (2)	Amsterdam (11)	**North**	**89**–88	South	(United States) Matt Bauscher
2008	April 13	Sporthallen Zuid	Amsterdam (10)	**North**	**113**–107	South	(United States) Tamien Trent
2007	February 25	Topsportcentrum (3)	Rotterdam (5)	North	98–**100**	**South**	(Ghana) Alhaji Mohammed
2006	February 26	Topsportcentrum (2)	Rotterdam (4)	**North**	**105**–102	South	(United States) Sergerio Gipson
2005	February 20	Topsportcentrum	Rotterdam (3)	**North**	**123**–108	South	(United States) John Thomas
2004	February 21	Martiniplaza (7)	Groningen (7)	**North**	**133**–107	South	(United States) Travis Reed
2001	March 3	Eindhoven	Eindhoven (3)	**West**	**117**–108	East	(United States) Omar Sneed
1999	February 19	Eindhoven	Eindhoven (2)	**All Stars**	**70**–59	Netherlands	(United States) Dan Shanks
1998	February 21	Ahoy (2)	Rotterdam (2)	Netherlands	79–**86**	**USA All Stars**	(United States) Chris McGuthrie
1997	March 1	Apollohal (9)	Amsterdam (9)	**West**	**143**–108	East	(Netherlands) Marcel Huybens
1995	March 4	Martiniplaza (6)	Groningen (6)	All Stars	112–**141**	**USA All Stars**	not awarded
1994	March 5	Eindhoven	Eindhoven	**North**	**96**–84	South	(United States) Kevin McDuffie
1993	March 20	Maaspoort	's-Hertogenbosch	North	129–**144**	**South**	not awarded
1992	April 4	Apollohal (8)	Amsterdam (8)	**North**	**116**–110	South	-
1991	April 6	Martiniplaza (5)	Groningen (5)	North	167–**174**	**South**	-
1990	March 3	Apollohal (7)	Amsterdam (7)	East	92–**94**	**West**	(United States) Rob Jones
1989	March 29	Apollohal (6)	Amsterdam (6)	North	113–**124**	**South**	(United States) Terry Coner
1988	April 24	De Slenk	Den Helder	East	133–**139**	**West**	not awarded
1987	March 8	Martiniplaza (4)	Groningen (4)	**North**	**112**–100	South	-
1985	September 7	Sporthal De Crosser	Werkendam	Netherlands	102-**111**	**USA All Stars**	
1984	September 15	Apollohal (5)	Amsterdam (5)	Netherlands	92-**103**	**USA All Stars**	
1982	March 21	Martiniplaza (3)	Groningen (3)	East	104-**107**	**West**	
1981	March 3	Apollohal (4)	Amsterdam (4)	Netherlands	89-**93**	**Le Coq Sportif All Stars**	
1979	March 25	Martiniplaza (2)	Groningen (2)	**North**	**114**–107	South	(United States) Hank Smith
1978	April 23	Apollohal (3)	Amsterdam (3)	North	158–**165**	**South**	-
1976	April 17	Apollohal (2)	Amsterdam (2)	**Netherlands**; USA All Stars in Netherlands	**97**–67 **109**-89	West Germany; USA All Stars in West Germany	-
1975	April 20	Apollohal	Amsterdam	Netherlands	69-**77**	**USA All Stars**	-
1974	May 11	Ahoy	Rotterdam	Netherlands	79-**91**	**Euro All Stars**	-
1972		Martiniplaza	Groningen				-

== All-Star Game Under 24 ==
Since 2004 the All-Star Game Under 24 is played as well. The game includes the best Dutch players who are under age 23. Players are voted by the coaches. The games are played with quarters of only 8 minutes.

Year	Date	Arena	City	Team	Score	Team	MVP
2015	February 22	Maaspoort	Den Bosch	North	103–108	South	(Lithuania) Vaidas Tamasauskas
2014	February 23	Kingsdome	Den Helder	North	122 - 112	South	(Netherlands) Quincy Treffers
2013	February 24	Kingsdome	Den Helder	North	73 - 63	South	(Netherlands) Craig Osaikhwuwuomwan
2012	February 26	Landstede Sportcentrum	Zwolle	North	97 - 100	South	(Netherlands) Kiran Celaire
2011	March 13	Landstede Sportcentrum	Zwolle	North	72 - 85	South	(Netherlands) Jeroen van der List
2010	April 11	Apollohal	Amsterdam	North	84 - 82	South	(Netherlands) Joost Padberg
2009	April 5	Sporthallen Zuid	Amsterdam	North	84 - 78	South	(Netherlands) Jeroen van Vugt
2008	April 13	Sporthallen Zuid	Amsterdam	North	62 - 70	South	(Netherlands) Jeroen Slor
2007	February 25	Topsportcentrum Rotterdam	Rotterdam	North	71 - 69	South	(Netherlands) Sjors Besseling

== All Star Gala Pre-Game ==
Year	Date	Arena	City	Team	Score	Team
1987	March 3	MartiniPlaza	Groningen	West (Ladies)	89–82	East (Ladies)
1975	April 20	Apollohal	Amsterdam	Netherlands Cadets	58–69	Belgium Cadets
1974	May 11	Ahoy	Rotterdam	Netherlands Youth	14–90	Belgium Youth

== Dunk Contest ==
^{1} Orlando Gomes wasn't a DBL player.

Year	City	Winner	Runner-up	Score
2015	Den Bosch	(Netherlands) Orlando Gomes^{1}	(United States) Chris Denson	–
2014	Den Helder	(Netherlands) Jeroen van der List (3)	(United States) Kelvin Martin & (Canada) Ross Bekkering	–
2013	Den Helder	(United States) DeJuan Wright	(Netherlands) Vincent van Sliedregt	40-39
2012	Zwolle	(Netherlands) Jeroen van der List	(United States) Amu Saaka	30-29
2011	Zwolle	(Canada) Ross Bekkering	(United States) Markel Humphrey	58-52
2010	Amsterdam	(Netherlands) Jeroen van der List	(United States) Jayme Miller	60-29
2009	Amsterdam	(United States) Anthony Richardson	(United States) Jayme Miller	50-29
2008	Amsterdam	(United States) Darnell Wilson		-
2007	Rotterdam	not held	(Netherlands) not held	
2006	Rotterdam	(United States) John Waller	(Netherlands) Giovanni	96-80
2005	Rotterdam	(United States) John Thomas	(United States) Dexter Lyons	138-127
2004	Groningen	(United States) Teddy Gipson	(United States) Travis Reed	-
2001	Eindhoven	(United States) Calvert White (2)	(United States) Daniël Jones	79 – 76
2000	Eindhoven	(United States) Calvert White	(Netherlands) Koen Rouwhorst	77 – 40
1999	Eindhoven	(United States) Chris Mims (2)	(United States) Carlton Bryant	76-73
1998	Rotterdam	(United States) Chris Mims		-
1997	Amsterdam	(United States) Claudius Johnson	(United States) Michael Thomas	-
1996	Urk	(Netherlands) Ronald van Velzen	(United States) Reggie Paul	-
1995	Groningen	(United States) Lynwood Wade	(United States) Chris Simpson	60-?
1994	Eindhoven	(Netherlands) Levy Wyatt	(United States) Mark Strickland	50-47
1993	Den Bosch	(United States) Marcus Campbell	(United States) Charles Edmunson	86-58
1992	Amsterdam	(United States) Lenzie Howell	(United States) Tom Brown	60-56
1991	Groningen	(United States) Maurice ‘Mo’ Smith	(United States) Lenzie Howell	60-59
1990	Amsterdam	(United States) Mark Mitchell (2)	(United States) Maurice ‘Mo’ Smith	60-59
1989	Amsterdam	(United States) Mark Mitchell	(United States) Bernard Day	28-15
1988	Den Helder	(United States) Rod Kittles	(United States) Terence Stansbury	16-10
1987	Groningen	(United States) Mike Reddick	(Netherlands) Martin Esajas; Final-6 (Netherlands) Okke te Velde (121) (United States) Tim Coles (115) (United States) Vic Alexander (112) (Netherlands) Jos Kuipers (100)	125-124
1984	Amsterdam	(Netherlands) Martin Esajas		
1982	Groningen	(United States) Wilson Washington	(United States) Antonio Martin	-
1981	Amsterdam	(United States) Dave Downey		-
1979	Groningen	(United States) Phil Filer	(United States) Charles ‘Buff’ Kirkland	-
1978	Amsterdam	(United States) Donald Washington	(United States) Dan Henderson	-
1976	Amsterdam	(Netherlands) Kees Akerboom Sr.		-

== Three-Point Contest ==
Year	City	Winner	Runner-up	Score
2015	Den Bosch	(United States) Maurice Creek	(Netherlands) Valentijn Lietmeijer	18–17
2014	Den Helder	(Netherlands) Arvin Slagter	(Netherlands) Kees Akerboom jr.	
2013	Den Helder	(United States) Andre Young	(Netherlands) Arvin Slagter	17-14
2012	Zwolle	(Netherlands) Terry Sas	(United States) Damon Huffmann	16-13
2011	Zwolle	(Netherlands) Ramon Siljade	(Netherlands) Jessey Voorn	16-13
2010	Amsterdam	(United States) Rod Earls	(Netherlands) Kees Akerboom, Jr.	19-18
2009	Amsterdam	(Netherlands) Kees Akerboom, Jr. (2)	(Netherlands) Arvin Slagter	18-13
2008	Amsterdam	(United States) Kees Akerboom, Jr.	(United States) Tamien Trent	14-13
2007	Rotterdam	(United States) Darnell Hinson	(United States) Ryan Sears	17-16
2006	Rotterdam	(United States) Gert Kullamae	(United States) Phil Goss	19-18
2005	Rotterdam	(United States) Brandon Woudstra	(Netherlands) Gert Kullamae	16-16 (4-1 x money ball)
2004	Groningen	(United States) Ryan Robertson	(United States) Gary Buchanan	17 – 14
2001	Eindhoven	(United States) Nathan Smith	(United States) Tyson Waterman	20 – 10
2000	Eindhoven	(United States) Matt Hunt	(Netherlands) Rob de Graaf	13 – 7
1999	Eindhoven	(United States) Dan Shanks	(Netherlands) Okke te Velde	17 – 10
1998	Rotterdam	(Netherlands) Mike Vreeswijk	(Netherlands) Marco de Waard	20-11
1997	Amsterdam	(Netherlands) Harvey van Stein	(United States) Modzel ‘Bud’ Greer	14-11
1996	Urk	(Netherlands) Okke te Velde (3)	(Netherlands) Dolf Duyvelshoff	15-12
1995	Groningen	(Netherlands) Okke te Velde	(United States) Modzel ‘ Bud’ Greer	20-15
1994	Eindhoven	(Netherlands) Marco de Waard (3)	(United States) Modzel 'Bud’ Greer	16-14
1993	Den Bosch	(United States) Modzel 'Bud’ Greer	(United States) Carl Lott	16-12
1992	Amsterdam	(Netherlands) Marco de Waard	(United States) Doug Spradley	15-11
1991	Groningen	(United States) David Moss	(Netherlands) Marco de Waard	17-15
1990	Amsterdam	(Netherlands) Marco de Waard	(United States) Fred Jenkins	10-7
1989	Amsterdam	(United States) Handy Johnson	(United States) Vince Washington	17-12
1988	Den Helder	(Netherlands) Okke te Velde	(United States) John Emanuels	16-10
1987	Groningen	(United States) John Emanuels	(Netherlands) René Ridderhof	22-20

== All-Star Gala Rosters ==
=== 70s ===
2nd All-Star Gala 1973-74
Ahoy Rotterdam, May 5, 1974: Netherlands – Euro All Stars in Netherlands 79 – 91 (att:42-44)
Netherlands (Jan Bruin): Wim Weemhoff, Pieter van Tuyll van Serooskerken, Jan Dekker, Ton Boot, Eric van Woerkom.
Euro All Stars in Netherlands (Jan Janbroers): Jackie Dinkins, Mike Rowland, Wennis Ozer, Bender, McNeely, Parker, Misko Cermak, Hank Smith, Harry Rogers.

3d All-Star Gala 1974-75
Apollohal, Amsterdam, April 20, 1975: Netherlands – USA All Stars in Netherlands 69-77 (ht:23-41)
USA in Nederland All Stars (Tom Quinn): Vic Bartolome 11, Gary Freeman, Nicky White, Harold Fox, Hank Smith, Dennis Rush, Charles ‘Buff’ Kirkland, Harry Rogers, David Walker, Steven Bravard, Richie Cornwall, Jackie Dinkins.
Nederland (Bill Sheridan): Herman Pluim 13, John van Vliet 12, Dan Cramer 10, Pieter van Tuyll van Serooskerken, Kees Akerboom Sr. (plus other 9 players).

4th All-Star Gala 1975-76
Apollohal, Amsterdam, April 17, 1976: Netherlands – West Germany 97-67 (ht:53-26)
Netherlands (Bill Sheridan): Kees Akerboom 21, Jimmy Woudstra 20, John van Vliet 15, Toon van Helfteren 9, Walter Ombre 7, Hugo Harrewijn 7, Jan Dekker 6, Charis Sideris 6, Jan Sikking 4, Harry Kip 2. Wiebe Gorter & Herman Pluim did not play due to injury.
West Germany (Azevedo): Rainer Frontzek 16, Friedrich Berres 10, Matthias Strauss 10, Harald Rupp 6, Klaus Mewes 5, Klaus Zander 5, Jörg Heidrich 4, Hans Kaltschmidt 4, Jürgen Kolze 4, Volker Asshoff 3.

Apollohal, Amsterdam, April 17, 1976: USA All Stars in Netherlands – USA All Stars in West Germany 109-89 (att:51-39)
USA All Stars in Netherlands : Owen Wells, Steven Bravard, Gary Freeman, Vince Fritz, Tyrone Marioneaux, Buff Kirkland, Hank Smith.

5th All-Star Gala 1977-78
Apollohal, Amsterdam, April 23, 1978: North – South 158-165
NORTH (Jim Parks): Al Davis 33, Dan Henderson 21, Pete Miller 20, John Franken 20, Hank Smith 18, Gary Freeman 16, Everett Fopma 13, John Wayne Croft 9, Emill Hagens 7, Bert Kragtwijk 1.
SOUTH (Manny Cramford): Billy Taylor 27, Arthur Collins 24, Ron Kruidhof 23, Bill Mallory 18, Charles ‘Buff’ Kirkland 15, Kees Akerboom Sr. 14, Mitchell Plaat 14, Jim Woudstra 12, Don Washington 12, Jan Dekker 6.

6th All-Star Gala 1978-79
MartiniPlaza, Groningen, April 25, 1979: North – South 114 – 107
NORTH (Ton Boot): Ed Murphy 30, David Moore 16, Mike Schulz 16, Gary Freeman 14, Bill Mallory 10, Charles ‘Buff’ Kirkland 9, Jan Dekker 8, Toon van Helfteren 5, Billy Taylor 4, Dan Cramer 2.
SOUTH (Charis Sideris): Jim Woudstra 20, Arthur Collins 17, Hank Smith 16, Wayne Armstrong 13, Renso Zwiers 11, Tony Parker 10, John Franken 8, Mitchell Plaat 6, Clinton Johnson 4, Al Davis 2.

=== 80s ===
7th All-Star Gala 1980-81
Apollohal, Amsterdam, April 20, 1981: Netherlands - Le Coq Sportif All Stars 89 – 93 (ht:42-48)
Nederland (Ton Boot): Kees Akerboom Sr. 21, Al Faber 20, Toon van Helfteren 13, Emill Hagens 10, Cock van de Lagemaat 10, Dan Cramer 9; Rob van Essen, Ronald Schilp, Edu Bolte, Hans Heijdeman, Ron Kruidhof.
Le Coq Sportif (Edwin van der Hart): Jim Moore, Rick Lewis, Tony Parker, Tom Barker, Hank Smith, Geerten Rijks, Dave Downey, Theo Kropman, Charles ‘Buff’ Kirkland, Jan Dekker, Jelle Esveldt.

8th All-Star Gala 1981-82
Martiniplaza, Groningen, March 21, 1982: East - West 104 – 107
EAST (Maarten van Gent): Al Faber, Jelle Esveldt, Antonio Martin, Tom Barker, Hank Smith, David Lawrence, John Franken, Dan Cramer, Jim Moore, Kees Akerboom Sr.
WEST (Ruud Harrewijn): Mitchell Plaat, Scott Runia, Charles ‘Buff’ Kirkland, Dave Downey, Emill Hagens, Urnick ‘Randy’ Wiel, Wilson Washington, Toon van Helfteren, Irving Chatman

9th All-Star Gala 1984-85
Apollohal, Amsterdam, September 15, 1984: Netherland - USA All Stars in Netherland 92 – 103 (ht:42-50)
Topscorers:
Nederland (Vladimir Heger): Jelle Esveldt 17, René Ridderhof 16.
USA in Nederland All Stars : Larry Gibson 19, Tom Lockhart 14.

10th All-Star Gala 1986-87
MartiniPlaza, Groningen, September 8, 1987: North - South 112 – 110 (ht:56-64)
NORTH (Ton Boot): Jose Waitman 18, Robert Sanders 17, Martin de Vries 17, Ronald Schilp 16, Jim Moore 14, Dewayne Johns 10, Peter van Noord 7, Rod Drake 6, Dewayne Sheppard 6, Rene Ridderhof 5.
SOUTH (Ruud Harrewijn): Victor Alexander 25, Tim Coles 21, Jos Kuipers 14, Donald Petties 10, Emill Hagens 9, Renso Zwiers 8, Mike Reddick 8, John Emanuels 6, Jelle Esveldt 5, Toon van Helfteren 4.

11th All-Star Gala 1987-88
Amsterdam, April 24, 1988: East - West 133 – 139 (ht:63-68)
EAST (Glenn Pinas): Keith Williams 26, Rob Jones 24, Albert van der Ark 23, Mark Mitchell 21, Dewayne Johns 19, Rod Kittles 15, Jeroen Talens 5, Martin Esajas 4, Dewayne Hardin 2.
WEST (Jan Dekker): Mike Reddick 29, Jos Kuipers 26, Terence Stansbury 26, Carl Lott 12, Raymond Bottse 11, Toon van Helfteren 8, Mike Marshall 8, Tico Cooper 7, Marco de Waard 4, Emill Hagens 2.

12th All-Star Gala 1988-89
Amsterdam, March 29, 1989: North - South 113 – 124 (ht:53-50)
NORTH (Glenn Pinas): Vince Washington 27, Emanuel Agbejemisin 24, Mark Mitchell 12, Bernard Day 11, Tico Cooper 11, Okke te Velde 10, Reginald Hannah 8, Martin de Vries 4, Rob Jones 4, Frank Ardon 2.
SOUTH (Rusty Blair): Handy Johnson 25, Anthony Robinson 19, Cedric Miller 16, Ronald Schilp 16, Mike Reddick 14, Raymond Bottse 11, Terry Coner 11, Jos Kuipers 9, Jerry Beck 2, Chris van Dinten 1.

13th All-Star Gala 1989-90
Amsterdam, March 3, 1990: East - West 92-94 (ht:56-49)
WEST (Ton Boot): Rob Jones 24, Peter Thibeaux 14, Tico Cooper 14, Okke te Velde 13, Modzel ‘Bud’ Greer 11, Fred Jenkins 8, Cees van Rootselaar 7, Ray Wingard 4, Marco de Waard 0, Darryl Spinks 0.
EAST (Henk Konings): Kevin McDuffie 21, Mark Mitchell 19, Maurice Smith 14, Bernard Day 9, Dewayne Johns 9, Claude Williams 8, Martin de Vries 6, Michael de Jager 4, Erik Griekspoor 2, Marcel Huijbens 0.

=== 90s ===
14th All-Star Gala 1990-91
Groningen, April 6, 1991: North - South 167-174 (ht:93-89)
NORTH (Jan-Willem Jansen): William Davis 37, Lenzie Howell 30, Doug Spradley 28, Bernard Day 25, Cliff Windham 19, Tyrone ‘Tree’ Marioneaux 16, Ed de Haas 6, Frank Ardon 4, Marco de Waard 2, Sander Kales 0.
SOUTH (Toon van Helfteren): Kendall Mack 33, Carl Lott 27, David Moss 20, Maurice ‘Mo’ Smith 18, Lamont ‘Mickey’ Randolph 18, Richard van Poelgeest 17, Kurt Colvin 16, Ray Wingard 12, Jos Kuipers 11, Wierd Goedee 2.

15th All-Star Gala 1991-92
Amsterdam, April 4, 1992: North - South 129-144
NORTH (Marten Scheepstra): Charles Bledsoe, Maurice Selvin, Lenzie Howell, Lamont ‘Mickey’ Randolph, Doug Spradley, Sanders Jackson, Tom Brown, Tony Worrell, Marco de Waard, Chris van Dinten, Casper Wit, John Jerome.
SOUTH (Jan-Willem Jansen): Richard van Poelgeest, Carl Lott, Ray Wingard, Marcel Huijbens, Akin Akin Otiko, Ed de Haas, Jos Kuipers, Modzel ‘Bud’ Greer, Marshall Wilson, Rob Rutledge, Frank Ardon, Brian Pollard.

16th All-Star Gala 1992-93
Den Bosch, March 20, 1993: North - South 116-100 (ht:61-45)
NORTH (Ton Boot): Jack Jennings 30, Mike Campbell 23, William Davis 15, Larry Griffith 15, Earl Wise 12, Rob de Bruin 12, Cees van Rootselaar 5, Peter Koning 4 (Okke te Velde, John Emanuels, Tom Sewell).
SOUTH (Cor van Esch): Carl Lott 18, Mark Hill 15, Rolf Franke 13, Herman Smith 12, Marcel Huijbens 11, Chris van Dinten 11, Modzel ‘Bud’ Greer 9, Mario Bennes 6, Frank Ardon 5 (Rickey Cannon, Paul Vrind).

24th All-Star Game 1993-94
Eindhoven, March 5, 1994: North' - South 96-84
NORTH (Meindert van Veen): Jeff Chambers, Erwin Hageman, Cees van Rootselaar, Kevin McDuffie, Rob de Bruin, Mark Mitchell, Arthur ‘AC’ Caldwell, Modzel ‘Bud’ Greer, Milko Lieverst, Mario Bennes.
SOUTH (Bert Samson): Keith Nelson, Virgil Ormskerk, Lorenzo Nash, Claudius Johnson, Richard van Poelgeest, Rob Korthout, Mike Vreeswijk, Marcel Huijbens, Mark Strickland, Jos Kuipers.

25th All-Star Game 1994-95
Groningen, March 4, 1995: Nederland All Stars – USA in Nederland All Stars 112 – 141 (ht:58-60)
USA in Nederland All Stars (Jan Eggens): Michael Huger, Matt Stanford, Michael Hodges, Ray Wingard, Sonique Nixon, Tyrone Travis, Lynwood Wade, Dylan Rigdon, Chris Simpson, Travis Stel.
Nederland All Stars (Glenn Pinas): Cees van Rootselaar, Mario Bennes, Okke te Velde, Evert-Jan Siderius*, Erwin Hageman, Richard van Poelgeest, Gijs Geerders, Erik van der Sluis, Hein-Gerd Triemstra, Dolf Duyvelshoff.
* Tico Cooper was injured and replaced by Evert-Jan Siderius.

26th All-Star Game 1995-96
Urk, March 2, 1996: North – South 123 – 120 (ht:52-58)
NORTH Noord (Glenn Pinas): Fred Ferguson 20, John Emanuels 18, Donell Lee Thomas 18, Modzel ‘Bud’ Greer 16, Ed de Haas 16, Reggie Paul 11, Matt Stanford 10, Jeroen Talens 7, Mario Bennes 5, Cees van Rootselaar 0.
SOUTH (Jos Wolfs): Richard van Poelgeest 33, Jeff Malham 18, Joe Moore 16, Marcel Huijbens 14, Riley Smith 12, Okke te Velde 11, Rob de Graaf 8, Gerard Ackermans 4, Michael Huger 2, Steve Leysner 2.

27th All-Star Game 1996-97
Amsterdam, March 1, 1997: West – East 143 – 108 (ht:66-59)
WEST (Jan Willem Jansen): Kas Waever 26, Ed de Haas 23, Eelco Derks 20, Modzel ‘Bud’ Greer 18, Joe Moore 16, Erwin Hageman 16, Harvey van Stein 11, Jerome de Vries 9, Teus van der Pijl 4.
EAST (Glenn Pinas): Marcel Huijbens 23, Donell Lee Thomas 20, Jason Lansdown 17, Peter Koning 12, Jerry Smith 11, Dave Tuinstra 8, Mike Vreeswijk 8, Reggie Paul 6, Steve Leysner 3, Edwin Luyckx 0.

28th All-Star Game 1997-98
Amsterdam, February 21, 1998: Netherlands – United All Stars 79 – 86 (ht:39-39)
Nederland (Lucien van Kersschaever): Koen Rouwhorst 16, Harvey van Steijn 13, Marcel Huijbens 12, Erik van der Sluis 11, Jasper van Teeseling 7, Okke te Velde 6, Mathieu ten Dam 4, Hein Gerd Triemstra 4, Michel van Houten 4, Mario Bennes 2, Cees van Rootselaar 0, Raoul Heinen 0.
United All Stars (Jan Willem Jansen): Brian Fair 21, Donell Lee Thomas 14, Chris Mims 14, Eric Bowens 13, Chris McGuthrie 9, John Smith 6, Tony Miller 5, Modzel ‘Bud’ Greer 3, Scott Neely 1.

29th All-Star Game 1998-99
Eindhoven, February 20, 1999: Netherlands – United Nations All Stars 59 – 70* (att:26-38)
Netherlands (Lucien van Kersschaever): Eric van der Sluis 16, Raoul Heinen 8, Jerome de Vries 7, Marcel Huijbens 7, Bas de Voogd 6, Vincent Krieger 5, Cees van Rootselaar 3, Koen Rouwhorst 3, Mario Bennes 2, Rolf van Rijn 2.
United Nations All Stars (Bob Gonnen): Eric Nelson 14, Dan Shanks 13, Ralphe Biggs 11, Ni Nelson Richards 10, Carlton Bryant 8, Rolf Franke 6, Anthony Coomes 3, Chris Mims 3, Tony Miller 2, Drew Henderson 0, Erwin Hageman 0.
*The game was played in 4 quarters of 7 minutes.

30th All-Star Game 1999-00
Eindhoven, February 19, 2000: Netherlands – United Nations All Stars 87-96 (ht:45-46)
Netherlands :(Bob Gonnen): Erik van der Sluis 29, Ralf Melis 12, Raoul Heinen 10, Bas de Voogd 8, Sander van der Holst 7, Vincent Krieger 6, Hein-Gerd Triemstra 6, Wierd Goedee 5, Jerome de Vries 2, Eelco Derks 2, Geert Hammink 0, Ron Borstel 0.
United Nations All Stars (Lawrence P. Nichols): Chris McGuthrie 19, Lorenzo Valera 14, Shanne Jones 12, Lamont Randolph 12, Maurice Ingram 11, Quentin Hall 10, Calvert White 6, Eric Nelson 4, Joe Spinks 4, Chris Mims 2, Eric Strand 2, Patrick Cortenraede 0.

=== 2000s ===
31st All-Star Game 2000-01
Eindhoven, March 3, 2001: West – East 117 – 108 (Quarters: 33-29, 62-54, 87-87)
WEST (Ton Boot): Hakeem Ward 24, Joe Spinks 20, Rod Platt 16, Chris McGuthrie 15, Derrick Tillmon 14, Angelo Falnders 8, Quentin Hall 7, Ed Norvell 7, Sydmill Harris 6. Jeremy Veal was injured, he didn't play).
EAST (Toon van Helfteren): Omar Sneed 30, Chatney Howard 16, Thomas Kelly 15, Hein Gerd Triemstra 12, LeRoy Watkins 11, Desmond Ferguson 8, Calvert White 8, Kendall Mack 6, Tyson Waterman 2. Lamont Randolph & Chris Mims did not play dur to injury.

32nd All-Star Game 2003-04
MartiniPlaza, Groningen, February 21, 2004: North – South 133-107 (Quarters: 37-27, 63-52, 99-77)
NORTH (Arik Shivek): Ian Hanavan 23, Travis Reed 22, Nii Nelson Richards 19, Valmo Kriisa 12, Gary Buchanan 12, Bryan Bailey 10, Steve Marshall 10, Latece Williams 10, Teddy Gipson 9, Travis Young 6.
SOUTH (Marco van den Berg): Daniël Jones 21, Kees Akerboom Jr 17, Marcel Huybens 15, Thomas van den Vondel 13, Willie-Jan Ackermans 11, Alexander Cuic 10, Ryan Robertson 10, Matt Langel 6, Kinte Smith 4.

33d All-Star Game 2004-05
Topsportcentrum Rotterdam, February 20, 2005: North – South 123-108 (Quarters: 23-19, 52-41, 88-71)
NORTH (Ton Boot): Dallas Logan 26, Greg Stevenson 25, Travis Reed 22, Nigel Wyatte 18, Daniel Novak 11, Brandon Woudstra 9, Valmo Kriisa 5, Erik van der Sluis 4, Justin Tatum 3, Scott Ungerer 0.
SOUTH (Toon van Helfteren): John Thomas 25, Maurice Ingram 16, Emmett Hall 14, Leon Rodgers 11, Michael Taylor 10, Gregory Harris 10, Sam Jones 9, Orlando Lightfoot 8, Gert Kullamae 5, Daniel Jones 0, Durelle Brown 0.

34th All-Star Game 2005-06
Topsportcentrum Rotterdam, February 26, 2006: North – South 105-102 (Quarters: 33-23, 54-54, 65-63)
NORTH (Herman van den Belt): Travis Reed 18, Chris Daniels 16, Darnell Hinson 15, Sergerio Gipson 13, John Turek 11, Hlynar Baeringsson 9, Tim Withworth 6, Wim van der Kamp 6, Niels Meijer 5, James Miller 2, Djoenie Steenvoorde 2, Kees Akerboom 2.
SOUTH (Randy Wiel): Leon Rogers 20, Alhaji Mohammed 14, Anthony Dill 14, Chris Woods 13, Phil Goss 11, Joshua Helm 8, Michael Nurse 6, William Frisby 6, Maurice Ingram 6, Joaquim Gomes 4, Gert Kullamae 0, Vincent Krieger 0.

35th All-Star Game 2006-07
Topsportcentrum Rotterdam, February 25, 2007: North – South 98-100 (Quarter: 24-25, 46-51, 73-73)
NORTH (Joe Spinks): Shelton Colwell 18, Travis Parker 17, Lawrence Hamm 16, Tamien Trent 14, Will Chavis 13, Mike Nahar 7, Darnell Hinson 6, Chris Woods 5, Peter van Paassen 2, Danny Lee Jones 0. JS Nash & Kemmy Burgess didn't play due to injury.
SOUTH (Randy Wiel): Alhaji Mohammed 27, Leon Rodgers 12, Monwell Randle 11, Chaz McCrommon 10, Tyrone Riley 8, Ransford Brempong 8, Taron Downey 6, Chris Carrawell 5, Arvin Slagter 4, Travis Young 4, Anthony Dill 3, Sam Jones 2.

36th All-Star Game 2007-08
Amsterdam, April 13, 2008: North – South 113-107 (Quarters: 24-17, 57-51, 78-78)
NORTH (Arik Shivek): Tamien Trent 18, David Chiotti 16, Stefan Wessels 13, Kevin Melson 12, Darnell Wilson 11, Alton Mason 10, Sergerio Gipson 6, Jeron Roberts 6, Jesse Kimbrough 6, Bradley Strickland 6, Peter van Paassen 5, Dillon Sneed 4.
SOUTH (Erik Braal): Trey McDowell 20, Patrick Pope 14, Kees Akerboom Jr. 13, Antoine Jordan 13, Tim Blue 12, Devonne Giles 8, Ashley Champion 7, Darrell Tucker 7, Chris Copeland 7, Charles Richardson 6, Djoenie Steenvoorde 0. Travis Young did not play due to injury.

37th All-Star Game 2008-09
Amsterdam, April 5, 2009: North – South 89-88 (Quarters: 26-21, 53-42, 71-66)
NORTH (Arik Shivek): Matt Bauscher 16, Ransford Brempong 16, Peter van Paassen 9, Seamus Boxley 8, Darnell Dialls 8, David Chiotti 8, Rogier Jansen 7, Robby Bostain 5, Orien Greene 5, Rein van der Kamp 4, CC Harrison 3, Teddy Gipson 0.
SOUTH (Don Beck): Darnell Wilson 15, Anthony Richardson 13, Steve Ross 12, Tom Blue 12, Nick Stapleton 9, Gerrit Brigitha 8, Kees Akerboom Jr. 6, Bobby Walker 4, Patrick Pope 3, Larry Abney 2, Dean Oliver 0.

38th All-Star Game 2009-10
Amsterdam, April 1, 2010: North – South 103-105 (Quarters: 25-31, 54-55, 82-83)
NORTH (Marco van den Berg, Hein Gerd Triemstra): Seamus Boxley 17, Todd Hendly 16, Darryl Monroe 12, Danny Gibson 11, Ronny LeMelle* 11, Monta McGhee 8, Rein van der Kamp 7, Robby Bostain 6, Jayme Miller 6, Tim Blue 5, Matt Bauscher 4.
SOUTH (Erik Braal, Herman van den Belt): Kees Akerboom jr. 22, Elijah Palmer 16, Markel Humphrey 14, Brandon Griffin 14, Bobby Davos 10, Patrick Hilliman 9, Anthony Richardson 8, Arvin Slagter 5, Torey Thomas 3, Jesse Kimbrough* 2, Daniel Jones 2, Dean Oliver 0.
* Ronny LeMelle replaced injured Matt Haryasz for North & Jesse Kimbrough replaced injured Peter van Paassen for the South.

=== 2010s ===
39th All-Star Gala 2010-11
Landstede Sportcentrum, Zwolle, March 13, 2011: North – South 84-107 (Quarters: 21-33, 40-57, 62-72)
NORTH (Marco van den Berg, Hein Gerd Triemstra): Monta McGee 18, Seamus Boxley 16, Jason Dourisseau 15, Ross Bekkering* 12, Mark Sanchez 8, Robby Bostain 4, Jessey Voorn 4, Dimeo van der Horst 3, Matt Bauscher 2, Sergio de Randamie 2.
SOUTH (Raoul Korner, Sam Jones): Tyler Tiedeman 2, Brian Laing 21, Markel Humphrey* 19, Jesse Kimbrough 16, Brandon Griffin 10, Stefan Wessels 6, Glenn Stokes 4, Marcel Aarts 4, Tim Blue 4, Kees Akerboom Jr. 2.
*Ross Bekkering replaced injured Matt Haryasz for North & Markel Humphrey replaced injured Julien Mills for the South.

40th All-Star Gala 2011-12
Landstede Sportcentrum, Zwolle, February 26, 2012: North – South 107-113 (Quarters: 33-36, 62-58, 86-91)
NORTH (Toon van Helfteren, Raoul Straathof): Jason Dourisseau 25, Worthy de Jong 15, Jevohn Shepherd 13, Seamus Boxley 12, Marc Sanchez 11, Cameron Wells 10, Thomas Jackson 7, Lance Jeter 6, Patrick Hilliman 4, Sergio de Randamie 4.
SOUTH (Raoul Korner, Sam Jones): Markel Humphrey 24, Kees Akerboom Jr. 20, Frank Turner 18, Tai Wesley 16, Maurice Acker 11, Yamene Coleman 10, Lucas Hargrove 6, David Gonzalvez 4, Stefan Wessels 2, Tyrone Sally 2.
*The game was played in 4 quarters of 8 minutes.

41st All-Star Gala 2012-13
KingsDome, Den Helder, February 24, 2013: North – South 118-129 (Quarters: 24-39, 61-63, 93-98)
NORTH (Ivica Skelin): Samme Givens 18, Storm Warren 18, Darryl Webb 17, Jason Dourisseau 17, Jamal Boykin 13, Aron Royé 11, Mark Hill 11, Zack Novak 8, Tanner Smith 5, Whit Holcomb-Faye 0. Jessey Voorn & Jeroen van der List did not play due to injury.
SOUTH (Raoul Korner, Sam Jones): Stefan Wessels 19, DeJuan Wright 19, Ross Bekkering 15, André Young 14, Rahmon Fletcher 14, Anthony Miles 12, Kenneth van Kempen 10, Antwan Carter 10, Arvin Slagter 6, Sjors Besseling 6, Bryquis Perine 4. Worthy de Jong did not play due to injury.

42nd All-Star Gala 2013-14
KingsDome, Den Helder, February 23, 2014: Dutch All Stars - International All Stars 123-121 (Quarters: 28-32, 63-59, 88-92)
Dutch All Stars (Toon van Helfteren, Sam Jones): Stefan Wessels 18, Kees Akerboom Jr. 17, Jeroen van der List 16, Worthy de Jong 14, Ross Bekkering 12, Arvin Slagter 9, Leon Williams 8, Sean Cunningham 8, Joshua Duinker 8, Rogier Jansen 8, Aron Royé 3, Kenneth van Kempen 2.
International All Stars (Ivica Skelin, Jean-Marc Jaumin): Jason Dourisseau 19, Cashmere Wright 15, La’Shard Anderson 14, Dan Coleman 14, Patrick Richard 13, Darius Theus 13, David Gonzalvez 11, Justin Knox 11, Holden Greiner 8, Tai Wesley 4. Justin Stommes & Emmanuel Ubilla did not play due to injury.

43d All-Star Gala 2014-15
Maaspoort, Den Bosch, February 22, 2015: Netherlands - Dutch Basketball League All Stars 127-125 (Quarters: 37-28, 63-60, 89-85)
Team Nederland (Toon van Helfteren, Sam Jones): Nick Oudendag 24, Worthy de Jong 20, Jeroen van der List 19, Charlon Kloof 14, Rogier Jansen 8, Dexter Hope 8, Thomas Koenis 8, Kees Akerboom Jr. 7, Dimeo van der Horst 6, Mohamed Kherrazi 4, Ralf de Pagter 4, Leon Williams 3, Stefan Wessels 2.
Dutch Basketball League All Stars (Herman van den Belt, Mark van Schutterhoef*): Brandyn Curry 23, Tyson Hinz 20, Yannick Franke 19, DeJuan Wright 15, Chris Denson 14, Kenneth van Kempen 14, Reggie Johnson 13, Marquise Simmons 7, Lance Jeter 0, Mark Sanchez 0. Joe Burton did not play due to injury.
*Mark van Schutterhoef replaced the initially chosen coach Eddy Casteels.

44th All-Star Gala 2015-16
Vijf Meihal, Leiden, February 28, 2016: Netherlands - Dutch Basketball League All Stars 100-98 (Quarters: 22-25, 46-54, 73-80)
Team Nederland (Toon van Helfteren, Sam Jones): Worthy de Jong 25, Kees Akerboom Jr. 17, Jeroen van der List 15, Arvin Slagter 10, Yannick Franke 9, Leon Williams 8, Mohamed Kherrazi 8, Stefan Mladenović* 6, Jessey Voorn 2, Maarten Bouwknecht 0. Thomas Koenis did not play due to injury.
Dutch Basketball League All Stars (Eddy Casteels, Richard den Os): Jason Dourisseau 24, Grant Gibbs 17, Dejan Kravic 14, Tyson Hinz 10, Rogier Jansen 8, Ross Bekkering 8, Javier Duren 5, Lance Jeter 5, La'Shard Anderson 4, Thomas Dreesen 3, Gian Slagter** 0. Stefan Wessels did not play due to injury.
*Stefan Mladenovic replaced injured van Ralf de Pagter.
**Gian Slagter replaced injured Aron Royé who was chosen to replace Max van Schaik who was also injured.

45th All-Star Gala 2016-17
Vijf Meihal, Leiden, (att:2,000), February 19, 2017: Netherlands - Dutch Basketball League All Stars 109-100 (Quarters: 27-32, 25-26, 32-30, 25-12)
Orange Lions: Maarten Bouwknecht 2, Dimeo Van Der Horst 0, Stefan Mladenović 5, Mohamed Kherrazi 10, Nick Oudendag 20, Olaf Schaftenaar 26, Jessey Voorn 20, Sean Cunningham 16, Arvin Slagter 10.
Dutch Basketball League All Stars : J.T. Tiller 7, J.T. Yoho 9, Jason Dourisseau 15, Jeroen van Vugt 6, Daviyon Draper 4, Jordan Gregory 0, La'Shard Anderson 15, Clayton Vette 7, Chase Fieler 18, Drago Pasalic 17, Lance Jeter 2.

== Players with most appearances ==
Player	All-Star	Years	MVP	Notes
(Netherlands) Arvin Slagter	8	2007, 2010, 2013, 2014, 2016, 2017	—	1x Three-Point Contest, 2x Runner-up
(United States) Hank Smith	7	1974, 1975, 1976, 1978, 1979, 1981, 1982	1979	
(United States) Modzel ‘Bud’ Greer	7	1990, 1992, 1993, 1994, 1996, 1997, 1998	—	1x Three-Point Contest, 3x Runner-up
(Netherlands) Kees Akerboom Jr.	7	2008-2012, 2014, 2015, 2016	—	1x Three-Point Contest Runner-up
(Netherlands) Okke te Velde	6	1989, 1990, 1993, 1995, 1996, 1998	—	3x Slam Dunk Winner & 1x Runner-up, 1x Three-Point Runner-up
(United States) Charles ‘Buff’ Kirkland	6	1975, 1976, 1978, 1979, 1981, 1982	—	1x Slam Dunk Runner-up
(Netherlands) Mario Bennes	6	1993, 1994, 1995, 1996, 1998, 1999	—	
(United States) (Netherlands) Jason Dourisseau	6	2011-2014, 2016, 2017	—	

== See also ==
- Belgian Basketball All-Star Game
