= 2019–20 ZZ Leiden season =

ZZ Leiden
2019–20 season
- Chairman: Marcel Verburg
- Head coach: Rolf Franke
- Arena: Vijf Meihal
- Dutch Basketball League: Cancelled
- Basketball Cup: Quarter-finalist
- FIBA Europe Cup: Second Round
- All statistics correct as of 1 July 2019.

The 2019–20 ZZ Leiden season was the 14th season in the existence of the club. The club is known for sponsorship reasons as Zorg en Zekerheid Leiden. The club will play in the Dutch Basketball League (DBL) and NBB Cup. It will also play in the FIBA Europe Cup.

In March, the DBL season was cancelled prematurely due to the COVID-19 pandemic.

== Overview ==
On 5 July 2019, Leiden announced head coach Rolf Franke was returning for a second season.

== Players ==
=== Squad information ===
ZZ Leiden roster
Players
Coaches

Pos.	No.	Nat.	Name	Ht.	Age
CG	1	(Netherlands)	Yaëll dos Santos Borges	1.88 m (6 ft 2 in)	25 – 25 March 2001
PG	2	(United States)	Tayler Persons	1.91 m (6 ft 3 in)	31 – 31 August 1995
SG	4	(United States)	Braxton Huggins	1.93 m (6 ft 4 in)	29 – 30 November 1996
PG	5	(Netherlands)	Marijn Ververs	1.94 m (6 ft 4 in)	28 – 17 September 1998
PF	6	(United States)	Jarvis Williams	2.03 m (6 ft 8 in)	33 – 21 January 1993
PG	7	(Netherlands)	Twan Polman	1.87 m (6 ft 2 in)	28 – 10 March 1998
PF	8	(Suriname)	Sergio De Randamie	2.01 m (6 ft 7 in)	42 – 5 July 1984
F	9	(Netherlands)	Eloi Nimako Sarkodee	1.87 m (6 ft 2 in)	25 – 19 July 2001
G	13	(Netherlands)	Troy Emeka Koehler	1.94 m (6 ft 4 in)	25 – 30 July 2001
G/F	18	(Netherlands)	Worthy de Jong (C)	1.94 m (6 ft 4 in)	38 – 14 March 1988
PF	14	(Netherlands)	Jelle van Heiningen	2.04 m (6 ft 8 in)	28 – 12 October 1997
SF	21	(Kenya)	Nuni Omot	2.06 m (6 ft 9 in)	31 – 3 October 1994
F/C	33	(Croatia)	Drago Pašalić	2.08 m (6 ft 10 in)	42 – 23 June 1984

Head coach

- (Netherlands) Rolf Franke

Assistant coach(es)

- (Netherlands) Ferry Steenmetz

Strength & conditioning coach(es)

- (Netherlands) Johan van der Bent
- (Netherlands) Jasper Haasnoot

Physiotherapist(s)

- (Netherlands) Arjen van de Paverd
- (Netherlands) Erik van der Pot

Team manager

- (Netherlands) Bart Kriek
- (Netherlands) Simon Hoogendoorn

Legend

- (C) Team captain
- (DP) Development player
- (I) Import player
- Injured

- Roster
Updated: 30 March 2019

Note: Flags indicate national team eligibility at FIBA-sanctioned events. Players may hold other non-FIBA nationalities not displayed.

=== Depth chart ===
Pos.	Starting 5	Bench 1	Bench 2
C	Jarvis Williams	Drago Pašalić
PF	Josh Cunningham	Sergio De Randamie	Jelle van Heiningen
SF	Worthy de Jong	Yaëll dos Santos Borges	Eloi Nimako Sarkodee
SG	Braxton Huggins	Troy Emeka Koehler	Twan Polman
PG	Tayler Persons	Marijn Ververs

== Transactions ==
=== In ===
No.	Pos.	Nat.	Name	Age	Moving from		Type	Ends	Date	Source
2	PG	(United States)	Tayler Persons	23	Ball State Cardinals	(United States)	Free	2020	17 July 2019	
4	PG	(United States)	Braxton Huggins	22	Fresno State Bulldogs	(United States)	Free	2020	30 July 2019	
6	PF	(United States)	Jarvis Williams	26	HydroTruck Radom	(Poland)	Free	2020	7 August 2019	
33	C	(Croatia)	Drago Pašalić	35	Donar	(Netherlands)	Free	2020	13 August 2019	
0	F	(United States)	Josh Cunningham	23	Dayton University	(United States)	Free	2020	19 August 2019	
1	G	(Netherlands)	Yaëll dos Santos Borges	18	BAL	(Netherlands)	Free	2020	21 August 2019	
9	F	(Netherlands)	Eloi Nimako Sarkodee	18	BAL	(Netherlands)	Free	Undisclosed	21 August 2019	
	SF	(Kenya)	Nuni Omot	25	MZT Skopje	(North Macedonia)	Free	2020	1 December 2019	

=== Out ===
No.	Pos.	Nat.	Name	Age	Moving to		Type	Date	Source
34	C	(United States)	Clayton Vette	30	Okapi Aalstar	(Belgium)	End of contract	4 June 2019	
10	PG	(United States)	Maurice Watson Jr.	26	Forlì 2.015	(Italy)	End of contract	4 June 2019	
15	SG	(United States)	Darius Thompson	24	Happy Casa Brindisi	(Italy)	End of contract	20 July 2019	
11	PF	(Netherlands)	Mohamed Kherrazi	29	Landstede Hammers	(Netherlands)	Mutual consent	12 August 2019	
14	C	(United States)	Kenneth Simms	32	Free agent		End of contract		
0	F	(United States)	Josh Cunningham	23	Free agent		End of contract		

== Preseason ==
Win Loss

31 August 2019 1	ZZ Leiden (Netherlands)	72–84	(Belgium) Filou Oostende	Leiden
	Pts: Huggins 22	Report	Pts: Thompson 16	Arena: Vijf Meihal

2 September 2019 2	Filou Oostende (Belgium)	91–72	(Netherlands) ZZ Leiden	Ostend
	Pts: Sylla 14; Rebs: Thompson 11; Asts: Five players 3	Report	Pts: De Jong 27; Rebs: Williams 7 Asts: Ververs 5	Arena: Sleuyter Arena

3 September 2019 3	Kangoeroes Mechelen (Belgium)	71–76	(Netherlands) ZZ Leiden	Mechelen
	Pts: Coleman 15; Rebs: Kok 10; Asts: Simons	Report	Pts: Persons 24; Rebs: De Jong 11; Asts: De Jong 6

5 September 2019 4	ZZ Leiden (Netherlands)	73–65	(Belgium) Kangoeroes Mechelen	Leiden
	Pts: Persons 23; Rebs: De Randamie 13; Asts: De Jong 3	Report	Pts: Clark 15; Rebs: Clark 7 Asts: Simmons 8	Arena: Vijf Meihal

11 September 2019 5	Hamburg Towers (Germany)	89–86	(Netherlands) ZZ Leiden	Hamburg
		Report		Arena: Edel-optics.de Arena

15 September 2019 6	ZZ Leiden (Netherlands)	105–67	(Netherlands) Apollo Amsterdam	Leiden
	Pts: Cunningham 25; Rebs: Persons 6 Asts: Persons 8	Report	Pts: Hope 14; Rebs: Ondaan 8 Asts: Bottelier, Hope 4	Arena: Vijf Meihal

17 September 2019 7	Novipiù Casale Monferrato (Italy)	78–70	(Netherlands) ZZ Leiden	Casale Monferrato
	Pts: DeShawns Sims 24; Rebs: DeShawn Sims 10; Asts: Chris Roberts 9	Report	Pts: Braxton Huggins 19; Rebs: Jarvis Williams 7 Asts: Tayler Persons 5	Arena: PalaFerraris

18 September 2019 8	Grissin Bon Reggio Emilia (Italy)	89–69	(Netherlands) ZZ Leiden	Reggio Emilia
	Pts: Reggie Upshaw 19; Rebs: Dávid Vojvoda 7 Asts: Gal Mekel 7	Report	Pts: Tayler Persons 22; Rebs: Talyer Persons 8 Asts: Tayler Persons 4	Arena: PalaBigi

== Dutch Basketball Supercup ==
As the winners of the 2018–19 NBB Cup, Leiden qualified for its sixth Supercup appearance.

22 September 2019	Landstede Hammers	78–68	ZZ Leiden	Zwolle
13:30 GMT+2	Scoring by quarter: 23–15, 25–16, 12–17, 18–20
	Pts: Johnson 26; Rebs: Kherrazi 12; Asts: Kherrazi 6	Boxscore	Pts: Williams 19; Rebs: Persons 8 Asts: De Jong 7	Arena: Landstede Sportcentrum

== Dutch Basketball League ==
=== Regular season ===
28 September 2019 1	Feyenoord	79–82	ZZ Leiden	Rotterdam
19:45
	Pts: Quentin Snider 20; Rebs: Austin Lawton 9 Asts: Keyshawn Woods 6	Report	Pts: Jarvis Williams 25; Rebs: Tayler Persons 8 Asts: Worthy de Jong 8	Arena: Topsportcentrum Rotterdam
