= 2018–19 Dutch Basketball League =

Dutch Basketball League
- Season: 2018–19
- Dates: 6 October 2018 – 1 June 2019
- Games played: 184
- Teams: 10

Regular season
- Top seed: ZZ Leiden
- Champions League: Donar
- FIBA Europe Cup: Landstede; ZZ Leiden
- Season MVP: (United States) Darius Thompson

Finals
- Champions: Landstede; 1st title
- Runners-up: Donar
- Playoffs MVP: (Canada) Kaza Kajami-Keane

Statistical leaders
Points	(United States) Darius Thompson	19.4
Rebounds	(United States) Tony Washington	11.3
Assists	(United States) Maurice Watson Jr.	7.9
Index Rating	(United States) Darius Thompson	23.5

The 2018–19 Dutch Basketball League (DBL) was the 59th season of the Dutch Basketball League, the highest professional basketball league in the Netherlands. The regular season started on 6 October 2018 and ended 30 April 2019. The best eight teams qualify for the playoffs which start on 2 May 2019. Donar was the defending champion.

The season saw Landstede Zwolle win its first domestic championship, after defeating defending champions Donar in the finals.

== Format ==
Due to the increase of teams from nine to ten, the format for the DBL season was changed. The eight highest-placed teams during the regular season qualify for the play-offs, while the two last-placed teams are eliminated. In the quarter-finals, a best-of-three series is played. In the semi-finals, a best-of-five series is played. The finals are decided through a best-of-seven series.

== Teams ==
Location of teams in the 2018–19 Dutch Basketball League

On 3 May 2018, the DBL officially announced the Dutch Windmills would make their debut in the upcoming season. Forward Lease Rotterdam changed its name to Feyenoord Basketball, as the team became a part of the multi-sports club of association football club Feyenoord.

Despite reaching the semi-finals of the NBB Cup and being in the fifth place in the DBL, Windmills struggled with financial problems throughout the season. In December 2018, Windmills was refused entrance to its home arena due to its payment arrears. On 10 April 2019, it was announced that Windmills would withdraw from the DBL. Its results in the second half of the competition were scrapped by the DBL.

=== Arenas and locations ===
Club	Location	Venue	Capacity
Apollo Amsterdam	Amsterdam	Apollohal	1,500
Aris Leeuwarden	Leeuwarden	Kalverdijkje	1,700
BAL	Weert	Sporthal Boshoven	1,000
Den Helder Suns	Den Helder	Sporthal Sportlaan	1,000
Donar	Groningen	MartiniPlaza	4,350
Dutch Windmills	Dordrecht	Sporthal de Boulevard	1,100
Feyenoord	Rotterdam	Topsportcentrum	1,000
Landstede	Zwolle	Landstede Sportcentrum	1,200
New Heroes	's-Hertogenbosch	Maaspoort	2,800
ZZ Leiden	Leiden	Vijf Meihal	2,000

=== Personnel and sponsorship ===
Team	Head coach	Captain	Kit manufacturer	Shirt sponsor
Apollo Amsterdam	(Netherlands) Patrick Faijdherbe	(Netherlands) Dimeo van der Horst	Adidas	Paul Meijering
Aris Leeuwarden	(Netherlands) Anne van Dijk (interim)	(United States) David Michaels	Jako	Friezon
BAL	(Serbia) Radenko Varagić	(Netherlands) Daan Rosenmuller	Spalding	–
Den Helder Suns	(Netherlands) Peter van Noord	(Netherlands) Tom Koopman	Burned	–
Donar	(Netherlands) Erik Braal	(Netherlands) Jason Dourisseau	Macron	Hepro Kunststof Kozijnen
Dutch Windmills	(Netherlands) Geert Hammink	(United States) Alec Wintering	–	PyrOil
Feyenoord	(Netherlands) Jan Stalman (interim)	(Netherlands) Ties Theeuwkens	Adidas	Autohaag Zeeuw
Landstede	(Netherlands) Herman van den Belt	(Netherlands) Nigel van Oostrum	Burned	Landstede
New Heroes	(Croatia) Ivica Skelin	(Netherlands) Stefan Wessels	Burned	New Heroes
ZZ Leiden	(Netherlands) Rolf Franke	(Netherlands) Mohamed Kherrazi	Peak	Zorg en Zekerheid

=== Coaching changes ===
Team	Outgoing manager	Manner of departure	Date of vacancy	Position in table	Incoming manager	Date of appointment
ZZ Leiden	(Belgium) Paul Vervaeck	End of contract	30 May 2018	Pre-season	(Netherlands) Rolf Franke	11 June 2018
Feyenoord	(Netherlands) Armand Salomon	End of contract	23 June 2018	Pre-season	(Netherlands) Richard den Os	23 June 2018
New Heroes	(Croatia) Silvano Poropat	Mutual consent	27 August 2018	Pre-season	(Croatia) Ivica Skelin	4 September 2018
Feyenoord	(Netherlands) Richard den Os	Resigned	10 March 2019	8th (7–19)	(Netherlands) Jan Stalman (interim)	10 March 2019
Aris Leeuwarden	(Belgium) Tony van den Bosch	Signed with Okapi Aalstar	8 April 2019	8th (9–22)	(Netherlands) Anne van Dijk (interim)	8 April 2019

== Players ==
=== Foreign players ===
In 2017, league policy was changed and the number of allowed foreign players per team was increased from 4 to 5. Additional was the restriction that a team is not allowed to have five foreign players on the court at the same time.

Club	Player 1	Player 2	Player 3	Player 4	Player 5	Left during season
Apollo Amsterdam						
Aris Leeuwarden	(United States) Nick Masterson	(United States) David Michaels	(United States) Griffin Kinney	(Lithuania) Deividas Kumelis	(United States) Darian Anderson	(United States) Jonathan Williams
BAL	(United States) Tony Washington					
Den Helder Suns	(Luxembourg) Alex Laurent	(United States) Steve Harris	(Belgium) Thibault Vanderhaegen			(United States) Lavone Holland
Donar	(Croatia) Drago Pašalić	(United States) Lance Jeter	(United States) Teddy Gipson	(United States) Grant Sitton	(United States) LaRon Dendy	(United States) Jordan Callahan (United States) Jobi Wall
Dutch Windmills	(United States) Shavon Coleman	(United States) Bennett Koch	(United States) Ryan Richardson	(United States) LaVonte Dority	(United States) Alec Wintering	
Feyenoord	(United States) Justin Gordon	(Italy) Emanuele Montaguti	(United States) Trevor Setty			(United States) La'Shard Anderson (Belgium) Marius Mwendanga
Landstede	(United States) Noah Dahlman	(United States) Sherron Dorsey-Walker	(Canada) Kaza Kajami-Keane	(United States) Kayel Locke		(United States) Franko House
New Heroes	(United States) Jonathon Williams	(United States) Keshun Sherrill	(United States) Payton Henson	(United States) Vernon Taylor		(United States) Steven Cook (United States) Darrell Davis (United States) Torian Graham
ZZ Leiden	(United States) Kenneth Simms	(United States) Clayton Vette	(United States) Maurice Watson Jr.	(United States) Darius Thompson	(Suriname) Sergio De Randamie	

=== Notable transactions ===
Transactions including players who have won a DBL award, were named to an All-DBL Team or were DBL All-Stars.

Date	Player	From	To
14 June 2018	(Netherlands) Jessey Voorn	(Netherlands) ZZ Leiden	(Netherlands) New Heroes
25 November 2018	(United States) Lance Jeter	(Lithuania) Pieno žvaigždės	(Netherlands) Donar

=== Notable retirements ===
Player	Date	Team	Playing career	Notable honors
Tjoe de Paula	19 April 2018	Den Helder Suns	2001–2018	2x DBL champion DBL Rookie of the Year
Kees Akerboom Jr.	31 May 2018	New Heroes	2001–2018	11x DBL All-Star; 3x DBL champion

== Regular season ==
=== League table ===
Pos	Team	Pld	W	L	PF	PA	PD	Pts	Qualification
1	ZZ Leiden	34	31	3	2950	2409	+541	62	Qualification to play-offs
2	Landstede	34	28	6	2844	2314	+530	56	Qualification to play-offs
3	New Heroes	34	26	8	2752	2313	+439	52	Qualification to play-offs
4	Donar	34	22	12	2833	2457	+376	44	Qualification to play-offs
5	Den Helder Suns	34	12	22	2489	2758	−269	24	Qualification to play-offs
6	Apollo Amsterdam	34	10	24	2469	2855	−386	20	Qualification to play-offs
7	Aris Leeuwarden	34	9	25	2409	2765	−356	18	Qualification to play-offs
8	Feyenoord	34	9	25	2401	2747	−346	18	Qualification to play-offs
9	BAL	34	5	29	2267	2828	−561	10	
10	Dutch Windmills (Note: Dutch Windmills withdrew during the third round. Only matches of the two first rounds count for the standings.) (D)	18	10	8	1282	1270	+12	0	Expelled

Source: DBL
(D) Disqualified

=== Results ===
Home \ Away	AMS	LEE	BAL	DHE	WIN	DON	FEY	LAN	NHO	ZZL	AMS	LEE	BAL	DHE	WIN	DON	FEY	LAN	NHO	ZZL
Apollo Amsterdam	—	94–80	91–71	92–80	59–71	73–85	91–89	60–91	66–106	61–93	—	88–59	80–60	92–80	—	58–72	89–78	63–87	85–79	83–91
Aris Leeuwarden	77–65	—	75–69	88–85	74–80	60–97	90–79	57–110	73–84	81–95	70–78	—	72–53	62–93	—	65–60	75–100	71–78	63–82	69–92
BAL	91–78	63–60	—	91–102	74–82	60–104	85–72	71–89	49–80	65–82	68–75	79–65	—	64–78	—	60–78	85–72	64–94	71–79	55–97
Den Helder Suns	77–68	67–68	95–64	—	55–76	73–91	76–67	67–80	55–88	73–78	102–82	76–66	95–64	—	—	67–96	80–69	44–76	76–87	57–68
Dutch Windmills	71–69	78–73	70–52	73–46	—	75–76	60–69	64–78	59–81	73–79	—	—	—	—	—	—	—	—	—	—
Donar	86–55	91–57	90–51	110–83	68–69	—	90–59	84–90	80–75	71–73	101–57	61–76	101–67	96–63	—	—	111–72	56–78	82–80	76–81
Feyenoord	67–52	83–72	68–70	72–69	60–77	77–79	—	77–89	64–76	80–91	78–56	57–103	69–54	72–69	—	66–82	—	75–66	60–74	58–97
Landstede	100–73	82–54	84–69	89–54	76–49	88–81	85–48	—	67–74	71–81	104–59	88–87	71–58	92–57	—	101–96	90–64	—	76–69	70–77
New Heroes	87–63	97–67	80–39	91–70	77–46	73–65	86–57	71–65	—	83–91	87–72	79–59	89–72	97–81	—	69–63	104–72	77–73	—	65–74
ZZ Leiden	93–72	96–75	100–73	97–76	91–66	83–77	88–64	82–87	72–67	—	89–58	91–64	103–84	83–61	—	82–85	92–68	79–82	89–59	—

Source: DBL
Legend: Blue = home team win; Red = away team win.
- Note: Dutch Windmills withdrew from the tournament during the third round. Only matches of the two first rounds would count for the league table.

== Playoffs ==
=== Bracket ===
Quarter-finals
1	ZZ Leiden	2
8	Feyenoord	0
4	Donar	2
5	Den Helder Suns	0
2	Landstede	2
7	Aris Leeuwarden	0
3	New Heroes Den Bosch	2
6	Apollo Amsterdam	0

Semi-finals
1	ZZ Leiden	0
4	Donar	3
2	Landstede	3
3	New Heroes Den Bosch	1

Finals
4	Donar	2
2	Landstede	4

=== Quarter-finals ===
Team 1	Series	Team 2	Game 1	Game 2	Game 3
ZZ Leiden	2–0	Feyenoord	96–72	103–68	
Landstede	2–0	Aris Leeuwarden	92–70	100–72	
New Heroes	2–0	Apollo Amsterdam	88–59	94–62	
Donar	2–0	Den Helder Suns	102–52	75–69	

=== Semi-finals ===
Team 1	Series	Team 2	Game 1	Game 2	Game 3	Game 4	Game 5
ZZ Leiden	0–3	Donar	76–77	71–84	63–93		
Landstede	3–1	New Heroes	63–89	75–67	76–68	75–74	

=== Finals ===
Team 1	Series	Team 2	Game 1	Game 2	Game 3	Game 4	Game 5	Game 6	Game 7
Donar	2–4	Landstede	72–69	53–62	70–84	88–88	53–85	71–78	

== Final standings ==
The final standings are based upon performance in the playoffs.

Pos	Team	Pld	W	L	Qualification
1	Landstede (C)	46	37	9	Qualification to FIBA Europe Cup regular season
2	Donar	45	29	16	Qualification to Champions League qualifying rounds (Note: Landstede rejected its invitation for the 2019–20 Basketball Champions League, moving its place to Donar.)
3	ZZ Leiden	39	33	6	Qualification to FIBA Europe Cup qualifying rounds
4	New Heroes	40	29	11	
5	Den Helder Suns	36	12	24	
6	Apollo Amsterdam	36	10	26	
7	Aris Leeuwarden	36	9	27	
8	Feyenoord	36	9	27	
9	BAL	34	5	29	
10	Dutch Windmills (Note: Dutch Windmills withdrew during the third round. Only matches of the two first rounds count for the standings.) (D)	18	10	8	Expelled

Source: DBL
(C) Champions; (D) Disqualified

== Awards ==
Award	Player	Team
Most Valuable Player	(United States) Darius Thompson	ZZ Leiden
Playoffs MVP	(Canada) Kaza Kajami-Keane	Landstede Zwolle
Statistical Player of the Year	(United States) Darius Thompson	ZZ Leiden
Defensive Player of the Year	(Netherlands) Mohamed Kherrazi	ZZ Leiden
Coach of the Year	(Netherlands) Rolf Franke	ZZ Leiden
MVP U23	(Netherlands) Rienk Mast	Donar
Most Improved Player	(Netherlands) Rienk Mast	Donar
Sixth Man of the Year	(Suriname) Sergio De Randamie	ZZ Leiden
Rookie of the Year	(Netherlands) Boy van Vliet	Den Helder Suns

== Dutch clubs in European competitions ==
Team	Competition	Progress
Donar	Champions League	Second qualifying round
Donar	FIBA Europe Cup	Round of 16
New Heroes Den Bosch	FIBA Europe Cup	Regular season
ZZ Leiden	FIBA Europe Cup	Round of 16

== See also ==
- 2018–19 NBB Cup
- 2018 Dutch Basketball Supercup
