= 2018 Dutch Basketball Supercup =

Donar	ZZ Leiden
74	69
- Date: 6 October 2018; 19:30 GMT+2
- Venue: MartiniPlaza, Groningen

The 2018 Dutch Basketball Supercup was the 7th edition of the Dutch Basketball Supercup. The game was played in the MartiniPlaza in Groningen.

The game featured Donar, the defending champions of the Dutch Basketball League, and ZZ Leiden, the runner-up of the 2017–18 NBB Cup.

Donar won the game 74–69, winning its record third Supercup. It was the debut game for Rolf Franke as head coach of Leiden.

== Match details ==
6 October 2018	Donar	74–69	ZZ Leiden	Groningen
19:30 GMT+2	Scoring by quarter: 20–32, 16–12, 20–17, 18–8
	Pts: Wall 15; Rebs: Sitton 7 Asts: Gipson 5	Boxscore	Pts: Thompson 19; Rebs: Kherrazi 8 Asts: De Jong 4	Arena: MartiniPlaza

Starters:			Pts	Reb	Ast
PG	30	(United States) Jordan Callahan	5	2	2
SG	1	(Netherlands) Sean Cunningham	2	2	2
SF	8	(Netherlands) Jason Dourisseau	6	2	3
PF	3	(United States) Jobi Wall	15	2	0
C	14	(Netherlands) Thomas Koenis	6	3	1
Reserves:					
C	33	(Croatia) Drago Pašalić	8	4	1
F/C	0	(United States) Grant Sitton	11	7	3
F	12	(United States) Teddy Gipson	13	5	4
F	11	(Netherlands) Shane Hammink	1	1	3
C	15	(Netherlands) Rienk Mast	DNP		
F	21	(Netherlands) Tim Hoeve	DNP		
F	31	(Netherlands) Arvin Slagter	8	4	1
Head coach:
(Netherlands) Erik Braal

Donar	Leiden

Starters:			Pts	Reb	Ast
PG	15	(United States) Darius Thompson	19	7	1
SG	18	(Netherlands) Worthy de Jong	12	7	4
SF	11	(Netherlands) Mohamed Kherrazi	10	8	1
PF	34	(United States) Clayton Vette	3	3	0
C	14	(United States) Kenneth Simms	11	0	1
Reserves:					
G	5	(Netherlands) Marijn Ververs	0	2	0
G	7	(Netherlands) Twan Polman	DNP		
F	8	(Suriname) Sergio De Randamie	2	2	1
G	10	(United States) Maurice Watson Jr.	12	4	2
G/F	13	(Netherlands) Troy Emeka Koehler	DNP		
Head coach:
(Netherlands) Rolf Franke
