= 2024–25 Primera FEB =

29th season of the Spanish second basketball league

Primera FEB
- Season: 2024–25
- Matches played: 324
- Teams: 18

Final standings
- Champions: Silbö San Pablo Burgos (1st title)
- Promoted: Silbö San Pablo Burgos; Real Betis Baloncesto
- Relegated: UEMC Real Valladolid Baloncesto; Amics Castelló; CB Naturavia Morón

Records
- Biggest home win: Alicante 110–70 Cartagena (5 April 2025)
- Biggest away win: Valladolid 62–96 Fuenlabrada (12 October 2024); Castelló 60–94 Betis (1 December 2024)
- Highest scoring: Cartagena 107–106 Castelló (29 December 2024)

The 2024–25 Primera FEB was the 29th season of the Spanish basketball second league. It started on 27 September 2024 with the first round of the regular season and ended on 8 June 2025 with the Final Four.

== Teams ==
=== Promotion and relegation (pre-season) ===
A total of 18 teams contested the league, including 13 sides from the 2023–24 LEB Oro, two relegated from the 2023–24 ACB and three promoted from the 2023–24 LEB Plata.

▼ Relegated from Liga ACB	▲ Promoted to Liga ACB
Monbus Obradoiro; Súper Agropal Palencia	Leyma Coruña; Hiopos Lleida
▲ Promoted from LEB Plata	▼ Relegated to Segunda FEB
ODILO FC Cartagena CB; Caja Rural CB Zamora; CB Naturavia Morón	Melilla Ciudad del Deporte (Note: It merged in a single team with Melilla Ciudad del Deporte Enrique Soler.); Cáceres Patrimonio de la Humanidad; Rioverde Clavijo

=== Venues and locations ===
Location of teams in 2024–25 Primera FEB

Team	Home city	Arena	Capacity
Aircargobooking Ourense	Ourense	Pazo Paco Paz	5,500
Alimerka Oviedo Baloncesto	Oviedo	Municipal de Pumarín	1,138
Amics Castelló	Castellón de la Plana	Ciutat de Castelló	6,000
Caja Rural CB Zamora	Zamora	Ángel Nieto	1,500
CB Naturavia Morón	Morón de la Frontera	Alameda	1,500
Flexicar Fuenlabrada	Fuenlabrada	Fernando Martín	5,700
Grupo Alega Cantabria	Torrelavega	Vicente Trueba	2,688
Grupo Ureta Tizona Burgos	Burgos	Polideportivo El Plantío	2,432
Hestia Menorca	Mahón	Pavelló Menorca	5,115
HLA Alicante	Alicante	Pedro Ferrándiz	5,696
Inveready Gipuzkoa	San Sebastián	Amenabar Arena	11,000
Monbus Obradoiro	Santiago de Compostela	Multiusos Fontes do Sar	6,000
Movistar Estudiantes	Madrid	Movistar Arena	13,109
Movistar Estudiantes	Madrid	Movistar Academy Magariños	600
ODILO FC Cartagena CB	Cartagena	Palacio de Deportes	4,815
Real Betis Baloncesto	Seville	San Pablo	7,242
Silbö San Pablo Burgos	Burgos	Coliseum Burgos	9,454
Súper Agropal Palencia	Palencia	Municipal de Deportes	5,012
UEMC Real Valladolid Baloncesto	Valladolid	Polideportivo Pisuerga	6,800

== Regular season ==
=== League table ===
Pos	Team	Pld	W	L	PF	PA	PD	Pts	Promotion, qualification or relegation
1	Silbö San Pablo Burgos	34	32	2	3011	2530	+481	66	Promotion to Liga ACB
2	Flexicar Fuenlabrada	34	27	7	2871	2595	+276	61	Qualification to playoffs
3	Movistar Estudiantes	34	26	8	2970	2710	+260	60	Qualification to playoffs
4	Real Betis Baloncesto	34	26	8	2838	2529	+309	60	Qualification to playoffs
5	Monbus Obradoiro	34	23	11	2787	2527	+260	57	Qualification to playoffs
6	Súper Agropal Palencia	34	22	12	2959	2737	+222	56	Qualification to playoffs
7	ODILO FC Cartagena CB	34	16	18	2627	2840	−213	50	Qualification to playoffs
8	Inveready Gipuzkoa	34	16	18	2667	2683	−16	50	Qualification to playoffs
9	Grupo Ureta Tizona Burgos	34	15	19	2987	3064	−77	49	Qualification to playoffs
10	Alimerka Oviedo Baloncesto	34	14	20	2673	2720	−47	48	
11	Aircargobooking Ourense	34	14	20	2796	2843	−47	48	
12	Grupo Alega Cantabria	34	13	21	2598	2811	−213	47	
13	HLA Alicante	34	13	21	2685	2696	−11	47	
14	Caja Rural CB Zamora	34	13	21	2674	2791	−117	47	
15	Hestia Menorca	34	11	23	2514	2660	−146	45	
16	UEMC Real Valladolid Baloncesto	34	11	23	2658	2909	−251	45	Relegation to Segunda FEB
17	Amics Castelló	34	10	24	2719	3014	−295	44	Relegation to Segunda FEB
18	CB Naturavia Morón	34	4	30	2430	2805	−375	38	Relegation to Segunda FEB

Source: FEB

=== Results ===
Home \ Away	OUR	OVI	CAS	ZAM	MOR	FUE	CAN	TIZ	MEN	ALI	GIP	OBR	EST	CAR	BET	BUR	PAL	VLL
Aircargobooking Ourense	—	78–94	96–77	79–73	99–66	89–90	93–65	86–87	77–81	85–81	76–83	77–85	73–79	101–73	94–86	60–74	94–84	95–84
Alimerka Oviedo	63–73	—	87–76	72–65	74–61	70–80	95–70	98–84	75–66	78–74	87–73	68–74	76–78	73–87	68–78	72–78	71–91	105–69
Amics Castelló	95–86	90–68	—	72–84	83–64	78–88	89–68	94–97	68–63	83–73	65–70	73–68	85–89	83–87	60–94	71–90	101–96	83–102
Caja Rural Zamora	93–84	100–81	96–87	—	84–71	71–73	71–82	81–94	86–73	84–86	84–75	60–90	64–94	94–83	95–105	73–79	84–77	89–68
Naturavia Morón	89–59	84–89	84–79	68–84	—	61–79	68–87	80–99	63–69	72–65	74–81	70–99	93–99	64–68	63–76	66–89	86–91	71–89
Flexicar Fuenlabrada	81–74	93–97	94–74	91–64	82–65	—	94–70	95–67	92–89	85–63	92–80	84–68	97–91	79–65	90–73	70–79	82–73	95–82
Grupo Alega Cantabria	86–77	80–73	96–76	89–71	85–81	67–75	—	83–80	86–87	83–72	101–108	58–85	75–92	84–69	81–76	74–85	59–83	68–73
Grupo Ureta Tizona	83–84	106–81	105–107	81–88	97–73	100–80	90–87	—	94–92	90–96	88–79	100–102	94–91	103–96	69–91	73–88	85–91	94–85
Hestia Menorca	65–84	69–64	90–66	76–69	70–58	72–83	84–62	88–95	—	73–71	72–81	76–81	66–77	86–87	78–83	54–85	84–78	65–67
HLA Alicante	90–71	87–79	78–82	68–70	86–74	69–81	60–75	104–89	96–68	—	95–82	90–85	88–77	110–70	57–64	90–88	95–96	64–73
Inveready Gipuzkoa	87–78	99–92	83–77	86–78	65–52	71–81	83–60	90–69	60–57	79–83	—	77–86	75–88	84–85	62–77	81–84	85–87	90–69
Monbus Obradoiro	68–71	76–65	100–72	93–59	78–65	75–79	93–54	95–89	83–67	82–70	63–65	—	90–73	88–62	71–67	85–91	77–76	91–79
Movistar Estudiantes	88–81	76–81	108–85	90–84	87–70	90–78	101–76	105–88	82–69	85–70	76–66	82–69	—	91–68	86–82	91–95	104–98	87–76
ODILO Cartagena	92–80	72–71	107–106	73–70	79–76	76–78	87–78	83–65	78–70	72–69	81–73	73–68	70–80	—	72–85	73–83	67–100	76–80
Real Betis Baloncesto	94–89	86–77	100–61	92–72	74–68	94–72	88–77	95–76	89–65	79–68	92–78	77–78	75–71	82–66	—	90–89	85–68	89–59
Silbö San Pablo Burgos	106–81	79–69	95–68	89–73	101–71	87–74	86–67	77–73	91–81	72–65	90–68	95–82	100–84	112–84	87–67	—	88–77	88–61
Súper Agropal Palencia	114–81	90–78	107–76	79–75	81–68	89–88	85–77	102–79	84–72	80–64	78–69	91–83	80–87	88–71	87–68	85–87	—	90–75
UEMC Real Valladolid	87–91	78–82	101–77	91–86	78–91	62–96	81–88	97–104	65–77	90–88	66–79	72–76	73–87	86–75	75–85	73–104	92–83	—

Source: FEB
Legend: Blue = home team win; Red = away team win.

== Playoffs ==
=== Bracket ===
Quarter-finals
2	Flexicar Fuenlabrada	92	83	90	3
9	Grupo Ureta Tizona Burgos	62	70	79	0
5	Monbus Obradoiro	87	72	94	83	1
6	Súper Agropal Palencia	83	85	101	92	3
3	Movistar Estudiantes	83	86	72	3
8	Inveready Gipuzkoa	71	84	68	0
4	Real Betis Baloncesto	95	77	83	88	87	3
7	ODILO FC Cartagena CB	94	85	87	80	68	2

Semi-finals
Flexicar Fuenlabrada	75
Súper Agropal Palencia	73
Movistar Estudiantes	82
Real Betis Baloncesto	86

Final
Flexicar Fuenlabrada	92
Real Betis Baloncesto	97

Source: FEB

=== Quarter-finals ===
The first legs were played on 16 May, the second legs on 18 May, the third legs on 23 May, the fourth legs on 25 May, if necessary, and the fifth legs on 29–30 May 2025, if necessary.

Team 1	Series	Team 2	1st leg	2nd leg	3rd leg	4th leg	5th leg
Flexicar Fuenlabrada	3–0	Grupo Ureta Tizona Burgos	92–62	83–70	90–79	—	—
Movistar Estudiantes	3–0	Inveready Gipuzkoa	83–71	86–84	72–68	—	—
Real Betis Baloncesto	3–2	ODILO FC Cartagena CB	95–94	77–85	83–87	88–80	87–68
Monbus Obradoiro	1–3	Súper Agropal Palencia	87–83	72–85	94–101	83–92	—

Source: FEB

==== First leg ====
16 May 2025	Movistar Estudiantes	83–71 (Series: 1–0)	Inveready Gipuzkoa	Madrid
19:30	Scoring by quarter: 23–18, 18–11, 22–16, 20–26
	Pts: Rodríguez 18; Rebs: Kravić 10; Asts: Granger 7 Eff: Kravić 25	Boxscore	Pts: Smith 18; Rebs: Ansorregi 8 Asts: Johnson 6 Eff: Johnson 12	Arena: Movistar Arena; Attendance: 9,935; Referees: Francisco José Zafra, Juan Pedro Morales, Juan Gabriel Carpallo

16 May 2025	Monbus Obradoiro	87–83 (Series: 1–0)	Súper Agropal Palencia	Santiago de Compostela
20:00	Scoring by quarter: 28–32, 17–12, 19–19, 23–20
	Pts: Balvín 16; Rebs: Brodziansky 6 Asts: Barcello 6 Eff: Barcello 23	Boxscore	Pts: Kunkel 21; Rebs: Krutwig 8 Asts: Wintering 5 Eff: Kunkel 18	Arena: Multiusos Fontes do Sar; Attendance: 5,573; Referees: Asier Quintas, Javier Ávila, Héctor Sanhermelando

16 May 2025	Flexicar Fuenlabrada	92–62 (Series: 1–0)	Grupo Ureta Tizona Burgos	Fuenlabrada
20:30	Scoring by quarter: 23–11, 25–16, 20–17, 24–18
	Pts: Matulionis 15; Rebs: Bilbao 10; Asts: Jorgensen 4 Eff: Jorgensen, Zurbriggen 18	Boxscore	Pts: Díaz 13; Rebs: Rodríguez 7 Asts: Soluade 4 Eff: Díaz 20	Arena: Fernando Martín; Attendance: 3,543; Referees: Leandro Lezcano, Antonio Manuel Zamora, Jordi Domingo

16 May 2025	Real Betis Baloncesto	95–94(OT) (Series: 1–0)	ODILO FC Cartagena CB	Seville
20:45	Scoring by quarter: 21–20, 21–16, 15–22, 28–27, Overtime: 10–9
	Pts: Cvetković, Hughes 20; Rebs: Hughes, Olumuyiwa 5 Asts: Cvetković, Renfroe 4 Eff: Cvetković 27	Boxscore	Pts: Hermanson 19; Rebs: Ugochukwu 7 Asts: Martín 5 Eff: González, Hermanson 14	Arena: San Pablo; Attendance: 1,352; Referees: Ariadna Chueca, Jesús Marcos Martínez, José Carlos Sierra

==== Second leg ====
18 May 2025	Movistar Estudiantes	86–84 (Series: 2–0)	Inveready Gipuzkoa	Madrid
18:00	Scoring by quarter: 19–21, 13–12, 25–25, 29–26
	Pts: Garino, Rodríguez 16; Rebs: Kravić 8 Asts: Granger 6 Eff: Garino 17	Boxscore	Pts: Johnson 19; Rebs: N'Guessan 7 Asts: Motos 5 Eff: Johnson 20	Arena: Movistar Academy Magariños; Attendance: 1,459; Referees: Paula Lema, Daniel Checa, Jaime Gómez

18 May 2025	Monbus Obradoiro	72–85 (Series: 1–1)	Súper Agropal Palencia	Santiago de Compostela
18:15	Scoring by quarter: 17–19, 24–12, 15–28, 16–26
	Pts: Brodziansky, Quintela 14; Rebs: Balvín 10; Asts: Faggiano 5 Eff: Balvín 19	Boxscore	Pts: Borg 20; Rebs: Krutwig 7 Asts: Borg 5 Eff: Krutwig 27	Arena: Multiusos Fontes do Sar; Attendance: 5,701; Referees: Germán Morales, Víctor Mas, Cristina Adán

18 May 2025	Real Betis Baloncesto	77–85 (Series: 1–1)	ODILO FC Cartagena CB	Seville
18:30	Scoring by quarter: 22–24, 17–26, 23–19, 15–16
	Pts: Hughes 33; Rebs: Hughes 10; Asts: Renfroe 5 Eff: Hughes 34	Boxscore	Pts: Jordá 20; Rebs: Ugochukwu 6 Asts: Martín 6 Eff: Jordá 23	Arena: San Pablo; Attendance: 1,388; Referees: Ángel de Lucas, Enrique López, Jorge Caamaño

18 May 2025	Flexicar Fuenlabrada	83–70 (Series: 2–0)	Grupo Ureta Tizona Burgos	Fuenlabrada
19:00	Scoring by quarter: 22–23, 27–21, 19–10, 15–16
	Pts: Jorgensen 20; Rebs: Bilbao 7 Asts: Westermann 6 Eff: three players 16	Boxscore	Pts: Pacheco 18; Rebs: Thiam 11; Asts: Pacheco 5 Eff: Pacheco 17	Arena: Fernando Martín; Attendance: 3,228; Referees: Carlos García, Juan Ramón Hurtado, Eva Aresté

==== Third leg ====
23 May 2025	Súper Agropal Palencia	101–94(OT) (Series: 2–1)	Monbus Obradoiro	Palencia
20:00	Scoring by quarter: 19–21, 27–26, 22–15, 18–24, Overtime: 15–8
	Pts: Vaulet 21; Rebs: Krutwig 9 Asts: Borg 7 Eff: Krutwig 21	Boxscore	Pts: Barcello 27; Rebs: Balvín 8 Asts: Balvín, Barcello 5 Eff: Barcello 27	Arena: Municipal de Deportes; Attendance: 4,904; Referees: Francisco José Zafra, Leandro Lezcano, Francisco Gonzalez

23 May 2025	Inveready Gipuzkoa	68–72 (Series: 0–3)	Movistar Estudiantes	San Sebastián
20:30	Scoring by quarter: 23–22, 18–19, 13–12, 14–19
	Pts: Díaz 22; Rebs: Díaz, Motos 4 Asts: Díaz 5 Eff: Díaz 27	Boxscore	Pts: Granger 27; Rebs: Kravić 10; Asts: Díaz, Granger 3 Eff: Granger 23	Arena: Amenabar Arena; Attendance: 11,000; Referees: Jacobo Rial, Javier Ávila, Fernando Ibáñez

23 May 2025	Grupo Ureta Tizona Burgos	79–90 (Series: 0–3)	Flexicar Fuenlabrada	Burgos
20:45	Scoring by quarter: 26–23, 19–29, 18–26, 16–12
	Pts: Pacheco 16; Rebs: Díaz 9 Asts: Pacheco 5 Eff: Pacheco 22	Boxscore	Pts: Durán, Nwogbo 20; Rebs: Cruz-Uceda 6 Asts: Zurbriggen 4 Eff: Nwogbo 27	Arena: Polideportivo El Plantío; Attendance: 1,000; Referees: Germán Morales, Héctor Báez, Josep María Olivares

23 May 2025	ODILO FC Cartagena CB	87–83(OT) (Series: 2–1)	Real Betis Baloncesto	Cartagena
21:00	Scoring by quarter: 16–26, 23–21, 15–17, 22–12, Overtime: 11–7
	Pts: Ugochukwu 20; Rebs: Ugochukwu 7 Asts: Martín 4 Eff: Ugochukwu 22	Boxscore	Pts: Hughes 25; Rebs: Radončić 7 Asts: five players 2 Eff: Hughes 20	Arena: Palacio de Deportes; Attendance: 4,522; Referees: Asier Quintas, Juan Ramón Hurtado, Rodrigo Palanca

==== Fourth leg ====
25 May 2025	ODILO FC Cartagena CB	80–88 (Series: 2–2)	Real Betis Baloncesto	Cartagena
12:30	Scoring by quarter: 15–29, 25–19, 22–26, 18–14
	Pts: Jordá, Ugochukwu 15; Rebs: van Eyck 8 Asts: three players 2 Eff: Ugochukwu, van Eyck 16	Boxscore	Pts: López de la Torre 22; Rebs: Radončić 7 Asts: Renfroe 5 Eff: López de la Torre 22	Arena: Palacio de Deportes; Attendance: 4,731; Referees: Carlos García, Leandro Lezcano, Cristina Adán

25 May 2025	Súper Agropal Palencia	92–83 (Series: 3–1)	Monbus Obradoiro	Palencia
20:00	Scoring by quarter: 20–15, 23–26, 16–18, 33–24
	Pts: Wintering 26; Rebs: Vaulet, Wintering 5 Asts: Borg 5 Eff: Wintering 31	Boxscore	Pts: Davison; Rebs: Brodziansky 5 Asts: Balvín 8 Eff: Balvín 22	Arena: Municipal de Deportes; Attendance: 4,985; Referees: Ángel de Lucas, Ariadna Chueca, Antonio Manuel Zamora

==== Fifth leg ====
30 May 2025	Real Betis Baloncesto	87–68 (Series: 3–2)	ODILO FC Cartagena CB	Seville
20:30	Scoring by quarter: 30–17, 18–19, 21–18, 18–14
	Pts: Hughes 18; Rebs: DeBisshop, Renfroe 8 Asts: Renfroe 4 Eff: Hughes 28	Boxscore	Pts: Jordá 14; Rebs: González 5 Asts: Martín 5 Eff: Ugochukwu 16	Arena: San Pablo; Attendance: 3,879; Referees: Germán Morales, Francisco José Zafra, Víctor Mas

=== Semi-finals ===
The semi-finals were played on 7 June 2025 at the Caja Mágica in Madrid, Spain.

7 June 2025	Movistar Estudiantes	82–86	Real Betis Baloncesto	Madrid
17:00	Scoring by quarter: 16–21, 16–21, 28–22, 22–22
	Pts: Granger 16; Rebs: Alderete 7 Asts: Granger 8 Eff: Granger 16	Boxscore	Pts: Hughes 28; Rebs: Radončić 8 Asts: three players 3 Eff: Hughes 41	Arena: Caja Mágica; Attendance: 5,960; Referees: Germán Morales, Víctor Mas, Juan Ramón Hurtado

7 June 2025	Flexicar Fuenlabrada	75–73	Súper Agropal Palencia	Madrid
20:00	Scoring by quarter: 9–16, 23–14, 21–34, 22–9
	Pts: Nwogbo 26; Rebs: McGrew 8 Asts: three players 2 Eff: Nwogbo 35	Boxscore	Pts: Borg 26; Rebs: Vaulet 8 Asts: Borg, Wintering 3 Eff: Borg 24	Arena: Caja Mágica; Attendance: 5,960; Referees: Francisco José Zafra, Leandro Lezcano, Cristina Adán

=== Final ===
The final was played on 8 June 2025 at the Caja Mágica in Madrid, Spain.

8 June 2025	Flexicar Fuenlabrada	92–97(OT)	Real Betis Baloncesto	Madrid
17:30	Scoring by quarter: 17–25, 24–22, 15–18, 25–16, Overtime: 11–16
	Pts: Jorgensen 26; Rebs: Nwogbo 6 Asts: Westermann 6 Eff: Jorgensen 23	Boxscore	Pts: Benite 24; Rebs: Hughes 7 Asts: Renfroe 6 Eff: Benite 25	Arena: Caja Mágica; Attendance: 4,225; Referees: Francisco José Zafra, Carlos García, Leandro Lezcano

== Final standings ==
Pos	Team	Pld	W	L	Promotion or relegation
1	Silbö San Pablo Burgos (C, P)	34	32	2	Promotion to Liga ACB
2	Real Betis Baloncesto (P)	41	31	10	Promotion to Liga ACB
3	Flexicar Fuenlabrada	39	31	8	
4	Movistar Estudiantes	38	29	9	
5	Súper Agropal Palencia	39	25	14	
6	Monbus Obradoiro	38	24	14	
7	ODILO FC Cartagena CB	39	18	21	
8	Inveready Gipuzkoa	37	16	21	
9	Grupo Ureta Tizona Burgos	37	15	22	
10	Alimerka Oviedo Baloncesto	34	14	20	
11	Aircargobooking Ourense	34	14	20	
12	Grupo Alega Cantabria	34	13	21	
13	HLA Alicante	34	13	21	
14	Caja Rural CB Zamora	34	13	21	
15	Hestia Menorca	34	11	23	
16	UEMC Real Valladolid Baloncesto (R)	34	11	23	Relegation to Segunda FEB
17	Amics Castelló (R)	34	10	24	Relegation to Segunda FEB
18	CB Naturavia Morón (R)	34	4	30	Relegation to Segunda FEB

Source: FEB
(C) Champions; (P) Promoted; (R) Relegated
