= 2018–19 NBB Cup =

NBB Cup
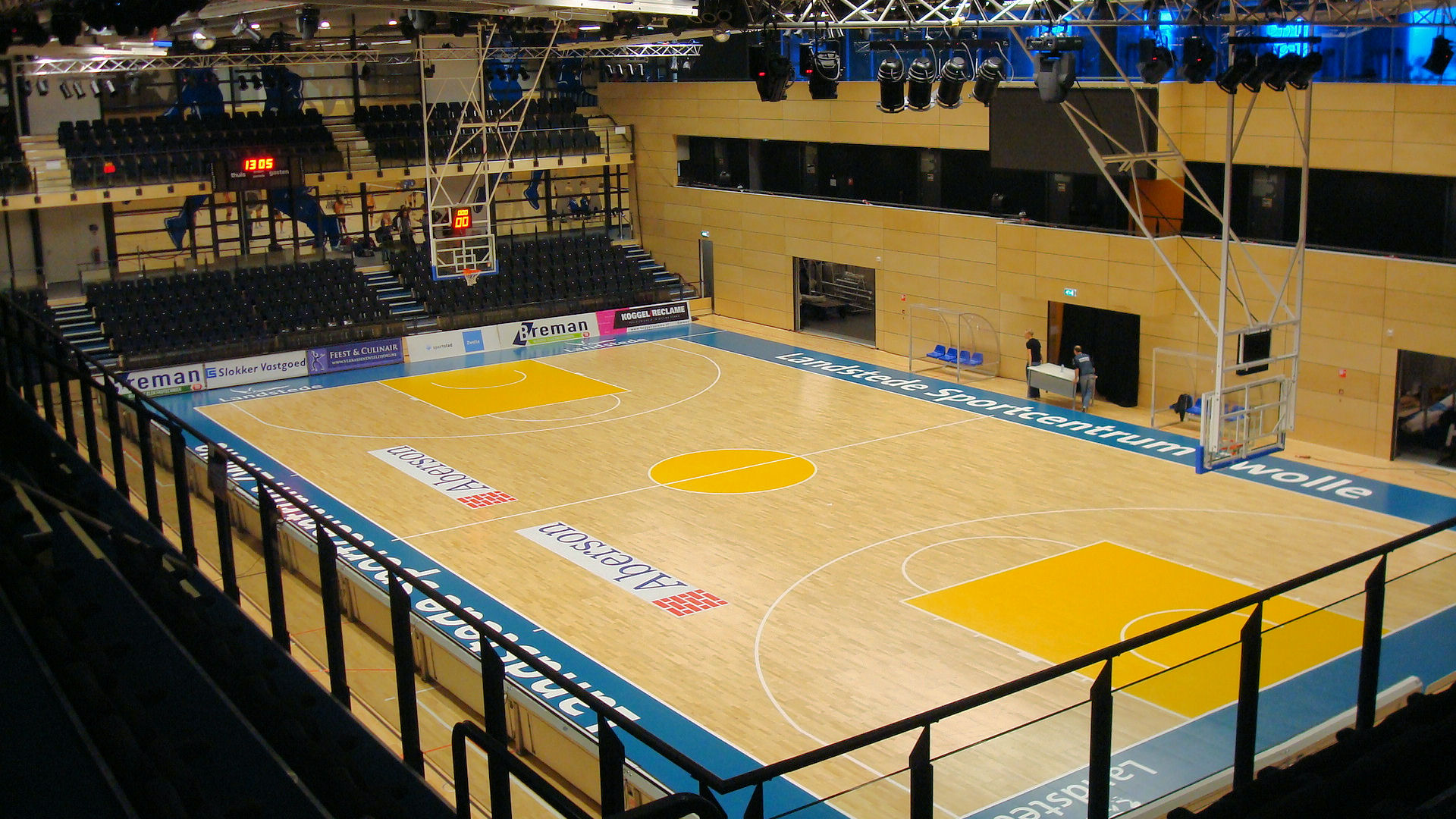
- The Landstede Sportcentrum hosted the final
- Season: 2017–19
- Teams: 52

Finals
- Champions: ZZ Leiden (3rd title)
- Runners-up: Landstede Zwolle

The 2017–19 NBB Cup (Dutch: 2017–19 NBB-Beker) was the 51st edition of the Netherlands' national basketball cup tournament. Donar was the defending champion. ZZ Leiden won its third national cup.

== Format ==
In the first, second and third round teams from the Dutch second, third and fourth division participate. From the fourth round, teams from the Dutch Basketball League (DBL) enter the competition. Quarter- and semi-finals are played in a two-legged format. When a team form a tier lower than the DBL played a DBL team, one win is sufficient for the latter to advance to the next round.

== Bracket ==
Fourth round
Grasshoppers	68
Donar	112
New Heroes Den Bosch	79
Den Helder Suns	34
Onze Gezellen	54
ZZ Leiden	81
Almere Pioneers	84
Apollo Amsterdam	95
BV Amsterdam	72
Virtus	64
Feyenoord	60
Dutch Windmills	81
Aris Leeuwarden	68
Landstede	89
Punch Delft	49
BAL	81

Quarter-finals
Donar	87	65	152
New Heroes Den Bosch	44	76	120
ZZ Leiden	89	89	178
Apollo Amsterdam	56	87	143
BV Amsterdam	46
Dutch Windmills	88
Landstede	103	79	182
BAL	59	60	119

Semi-finals
Donar	66	79	145
ZZ Leiden	71	78	149
Dutch Windmills	72	87	159
Landstede	73	91	164

Final
31 March – Zwolle
ZZ Leiden	87
Landstede	69

== Semi-finals ==
The draw for the semi-finals was held on 18 January 2019.

=== First leg ===
The result of the first match between Windmills and Landstede was changed after four days, from 72–72 to 72–73, as a free throw was missed in the boxscore.

7 February 2019	Dutch Windmills	72–73	Landstede Basketbal	De Boulevard, Dordrecht
20:00	Scoring by quarter: 22–19, 10–7, 17–23, 23–24
	Pts: Shavon Coleman 18; Rebs: Floris Versteeg 10; Asts: Alec Wintering 4	Boxscore	Pts: Noah Dahlman 23; Rebs: Ralf de Pagter 8 Asts: Mike Schilder 4

13 February 2019	Donar	66–71	ZZ Leiden	MartiniPlaza, Groningen
19:30	Scoring by quarter: 12–21, 23–13, 13–25, 18–12
PodiumTV	Pts: Thomas Koenis 14; Rebs: Thomas Koenis 10; Asts: Thomas Koenis 4	Boxscore	Pts: Darius Thompson 20; Rebs: Mohamed Kherrazi 7 Asts: Maurice Watson 9

=== Second leg ===
14 February 2019	Landstede Basketbal	91–87	Dutch Windmills	Landstede Sportcentrum, Zwolle
20:00	Scoring by quarter: 18-26, 20-18, 31-15, 22-28
	Pts: Sherron Dorsey-Walker 24; Rebs: Noah Dahlman 11; Asts: Kaza Kajami-Keane 5	Boxscore	Pts: Ryan Richardson 22; Rebs: Jito Kok 7 Asts: six players 1

== Final ==
31 March 2019
15:00

Landstede	69–87	ZZ Leiden
Scoring by quarter: 20–23, 17–18, 17–21, 15–25
Pts: Noah Dahlman 23; Rebs: Ralf de Pagter 5 Asts: Kaza Kajami-Keane 5		Pts: Darius Thompson 25; Rebs: Worthy de Jong 9 Asts: Darius Thompson 8

Landstede Sportcentrum, Zwolle
Attendance: 1,200

== Winning roster ==
- 5 Ververs
- 8 De Randamie
- 10 Watson Jr.
- 14 Simms
- 15 Thompson
- 18 De Jong
- 34 Vette
- Head coach: Franke

== Awards ==
=== NBB Cup Most Valuable Player ===
Player	Team
(United States) Darius Thompson	ZZ Leiden

== See also ==
- 2018–19 Dutch Basketball League
