= La'Shard Anderson =

American basketball player

Personal information
- Born: 27 April 1989 (age 37) San Diego, California
- Listed height: 185 cm (6 ft 1 in)
- Listed weight: 77 kg (170 lb)

Career information
- High school: Junipero Serra (San Diego, California)
- College: Irvine Valley (2007–2008); Boise State (2008–2011)
- NBA draft: 2011: undrafted
- Playing career: 2011–present
- Position: Point guard / shooting guard

Career history
- 2011–2012: Optima Gent
- 2012–2013: Club Africain
- 2013–2014: Rotterdam
- 2015: Bulls Kapfenberg
- 2016–2017: Rotterdam
- 2017: AEK Larnaca
- 2017–2018: Near East University
- 2018: Feyenoord
- 2018: AEK Larnaca
- 2019–present: ÉS Radès

Career highlights
- 3x DBL All-Star (2014, 2016, 2017); First-team All-WAC (2011)

La'Shard Suava Anderson (born 27 April 1989) is an American basketball player. He played college basketball for the Boise State Broncos.

== Career ==
Andreson signed with Optima Gent in August 2011. He averaged 4.9 points in 15 minutes per game in 25 games for Gent.

On 25 January 2013 he signed with the Tunisian club Club Africain.

In July 2013, Anderson signed with Rotterdam Basketbal College from the Dutch Basketball League (DBL). On December 11, he scored 47 points in a double overtime win over Aris Leeuwarden, the league's highest point tally by a player since Robby Bostain in 2009.

On 28 January 2015 he signed with ece Bulls Kapfenberg in Austria.

On 2 January 2016 Anderson signed with his former team Challenge Sports Rotterdam.

On 9 March 2017, Anderson transferred to AEK Larnaca. In the 2017–18 season, Anderson played for the Near East University's basketball team in the third division Cypriotic North League.

On 17 August 2018, Anderson returned to Feyenoord Basketbal, previously named Rotterdam, as he signed for the 2018–19 season. On 16 October, Feyenoord released Anderson. Anderson appeared in three DBL games and averaged 12.7 points per game.
