= LaVonte Dority =

American basketball player (born 1991)

Valparaiso Beacons
- Positions: Recruiting & Player Development Coach
- League: Missouri Valley Conference

Personal information
- Born: October 28, 1991 (age 35) Chicago, Illinois
- Listed height: 1.85 m (6 ft 1 in)
- Listed weight: 91 kg (201 lb)

Career information
- High school: Foreman (Chicago, Illinois)
- College: South Florida (2010–2012); Valparaiso (2012–2014)
- NBA draft: 2014: undrafted
- Playing career: 2014–2020

Career history

Playing
- 2014–2015: Kirchheim Knights
- 2016–2017: Francavilla Fontana
- 2017–2018: Den Helder Suns
- 2018–2019: Dutch Windmills
- 2019–2020: T71 Dudelange

Coaching
- 2025–present: Valparaiso

Career highlights
- First-team All-Horizon League (2014)

LaVonte Dority (born October 28, 1991) is an American former professional basketball player who last played for T71 Dudelange of the Total League. He is now the Recruiting & Player Development Coach of the Valparaiso Beacons men's basketball team.

== Professional career ==
=== Den Helder Suns ===
On July 15, 2017, Dority signed his first professional contract with the Den Helder Suns of the Dutch Basketball League (DBL). The team acquired Dority as it was looking for a player with "experience and a strong appearance." On February 15, 2018, Dority scored a season-high 33 points in an 85–83 win over BAL. As the starting point guard of Den Helder, he finished the 2017–18 season with Den Helder in the eight place of the regular season. Dority averaged 14.5 points and 2.8 assists over 30 games.

=== Dutch Windmills ===
On December 3, 2018, Dority was announced by Dutch club Dutch Windmills where he signed for the remainder of the 2018–19 season. On April 10, 2019, Windmills withdrew from the DBL due to its financial problems.

=== T71 Dudelange ===
In July 2019, Dority signed with T71 Dudelange of the Luxembourgian Total League.

== Coaching career ==
On July 28, 2025, Valparaiso University announced Dority had returned to Valpo as the program's Recruiting & Player Development Coach under head coach Roger Powell Jr.
