= Kevin Parks (American football) =

American football player (born 1998)

Profile
- Position: Running back

Personal information
- Listed height: 5 ft 6 in (1.68 m)
- Listed weight: 201 lb (91 kg)

Career information
- High school: West Rowan (Mount Ulla, North Carolina)
- College: Virginia (2010–2014)
- NFL draft: 2015: undrafted

Career history
- Cologne Crocodiles (2017)

Awards and highlights
- Second-team All-ACC (2013); Third-team All-ACC (2014)
- Stats at Pro Football Reference

Kevin Parks is an American former college football running back who played for the Virginia Cavaliers. He also played professionally for the Cologne Crocodiles of the German Football League.

== Early life ==
Parks played high school football at West Rowan High School in Mount Ulla, North Carolina. He rushed for 1,721 yards and 23 touchdowns in 2006, 2,536 yards and 33 touchdowns in 2007, over 2,800 yards and 43 touchdowns in 2008, and 3,794 yards and 59 touchdowns in 2009. His senior year, he set the single-season state rushing yards record with 3,794, earning Old Spice Red Zone National Player of the Year, Associated Press North Carolina 3A Player of the Year, Parade All-America, EA Sports second-team All-American, and MaxPreps first-team All-American for Medium Schools (1,000–2,000 enrollment) honors.

His 10,895 career rushing yards also set a state record and were the third most all-time in the country. His 55 games with at least 100 rushing yards, and his 1,370 career carries both set national records as well (carries record dates back to 1991). He helped West Rowan win the 3A state title in 2008 and 2009. In the class of 2010, Parks was rated the No. 52 running back in the country and a three-star recruit by Rivals.com, and the No. 56 running back in the country and a three-star recruit by ESPN.com.

== College career ==
Parks played college football for the Virginia Cavaliers from 2011 to 2014. He was redshirted in 2010.

He played in 12 games his redshirt freshman year in 2011, rushing 152 times for 709 yards and nine touchdowns. He also caught 11 passes for 82 yards and one touchdown. He missed one game that season with a "lower extremity injury". His nine rushing touchdowns that year set a single-season school record.

Parks appeared in all 12 games, starting two, in 2012, carrying the ball 160 times for 734 yards and five touchdowns and recording 24 receptions for 189 yards (no touchdowns). He started all 12 games in 2013, rushing 227 times for 1,031 yards and 11 touchdowns while also catching 38 passes for 329 yards and one touchdown, earning second-team All-Atlantic Coast Conference (ACC) honors.

He started all 12 games for the second consecutive season in 2014, recording 189 rushing attempts for 745 yards and four touchdowns and 30 receptions for 179 yards and two touchdowns, garnering third-team All-ACC and Coaches second-team All-ACC accolades.

He finished his college career fifth all-time in school history with 3,219 rushing yards, and fourth in school history with 29 rushing touchdowns.

== Professional career ==
Parks went undrafted in the 2015 NFL draft and never signed with an NFL team. The Salisbury Post speculated that this was due to his poor 40-yard dash time of 4.7 seconds and his small frame (5' 6" without shoes). In 2016, he was selected by Norfolk in the 61st round of the Major League Football draft. He played for the Cologne Crocodiles of the German Football League in 2017, totaling 1,502 rushing yards, 25 catches for 268 yards, and 12 kickoff returns for 393 yards.

== Personal life ==
Parks retired after the 2017 season and started working as a youth football trainer and coach.

Parks's father was a defensive tackle at Catawba College.
