= Keshun Sherrill =

American basketball player (born 1994)

Cedi Osman Basket
- Position: Point guard
- League: Türkiye Basketbol Ligi

Personal information
- Born: August 12, 1994 (age 32) Cleveland, North Carolina, U.S.
- Listed height: 5 ft 9 in (1.75 m)
- Listed weight: 161 lb (73 kg)

Career information
- High school: West Rowan (Mount Ulla, North Carolina)
- College: Augusta University (2013–2017)
- NBA draft: 2017: undrafted
- Playing career: 2017–present

Career history
- 2017–2019: New Heroes Den Bosch
- 2019–2020: Yalova Belediye
- 2020–2021: Kocaeli BB Kağıtspor
- 2021–2022: TED Ankara Kolejliler
- 2022–2023: APU Udine
- 2023: Mantovana
- 2023: Dorados de Chihuahua
- 2024: İTÜ
- 2024: APU Udine
- 2024–2026: İTÜ
- 2026–present: Cedi Osman Basket

Keshun Sherrill (born August 12, 1994) is an American professional basketball player for Cedi Osman Basket of the Türkiye Basketbol Ligi (TBL). Standing at 175 cm (5 ft 9 in), he usually plays as a point guard. Sherrill played college basketball for the Augusta Jaguars.

== Professional career ==
On 16 July 2017, Sherrill signed with New Heroes Den Bosch of the Dutch Basketball League (DBL). On April 4, 2018, Sherrill scored a season-high 31 points in an 82–93 win over Apollo Amsterdam. In his first season, he averaged 16.4 points and 3.6 assists in 30.7 minutes per game in the regular season.

On 27 July 2018, Sherrill re-signed for a second season with Den Bosch.

On 20 August 2019, Sherrill was announced by Yalova Belediye of the Turkish Basketball First League. In 2020, he joined Kocaeli BB Kağıtspor and averaged 21.7 points, 4.1 assists, 3.9 rebounds, and 1.3 steals per game. On August 3, 2021, Sherrill signed with TED Ankara Kolejliler.

== Career statistics ==
Legend
GP	Games played	MPG	Minutes per game	FG%	Field goal percentage
3P%	3-point field goal percentage	FT%	Free throw percentage	RPG	Rebounds per game
APG	Assists per game	SPG	Steals per game	BPG	Blocks per game
PPG	Points per game	**Bold**	Career high		Led the league

=== Domestic leagues ===
Year	Team	GP	GS	MPG	FG%	3P%	FT%	RPG	APG	SPG	BPG	PPG
2017–18	New Heroes Den Bosch	33	30	30.5	.441	.389	.857	2.2	3.4	1.2	.2	16.5
2018–19	New Heroes Den Bosch	31	31	27.5	.476	.387	.810	2.5	3.4	1.7	.0	12.5
