= Chris Smith (defensive end) =

American football player (1992–2023)

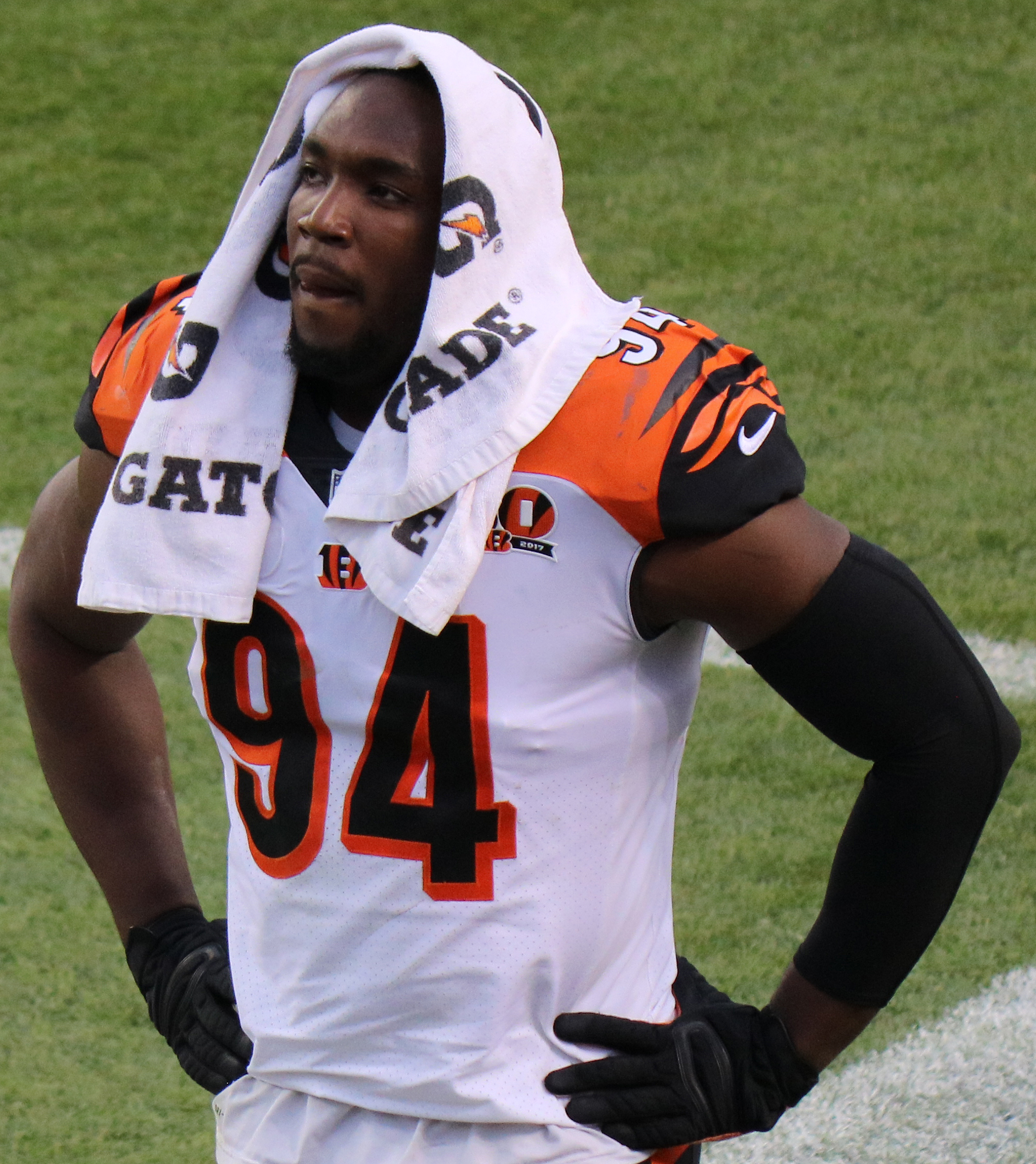
- Smith with the Cincinnati Bengals in 2017

No. 98, 94, 50, 92, 42
- Position: Defensive end

Personal information
- Born: February 11, 1992; Salisbury, North Carolina, U.S.
- Died: April 17, 2023 (aged 31)
- Listed height: 6 ft 1 in (1.85 m)
- Listed weight: 266 lb (121 kg)

Career information
- High school: West Rowan (Mount Ulla, North Carolina)
- College: Arkansas (2010–2013)
- NFL draft: 2014: 5th round, 159th overall pick

Career history
- Jacksonville Jaguars (2014–2016); Cincinnati Bengals (2017); Cleveland Browns (2018–2019); Carolina Panthers (2020)*; Las Vegas Raiders (2020); Baltimore Ravens (2021)*; Houston Texans (2021); Seattle Sea Dragons (2023)
- * Offseason or practice squad member only

Awards and highlights
- Second-team All-SEC (2013)

Career NFL statistics
- Total tackles: 80
- Sacks: 11
- Forced fumbles: 3
- Stats at Pro Football Reference

Chris Smith (February 11, 1992 – April 17, 2023) was an American professional football player who was a defensive end in the National Football League (NFL) for eight seasons. He played college football for the Arkansas Razorbacks. Smith was selected by the Jacksonville Jaguars in the fifth round of the 2014 NFL draft. He was also a member of the Cincinnati Bengals, Cleveland Browns, Carolina Panthers, Las Vegas Raiders, Baltimore Ravens, and Houston Texans of the NFL and Seattle Sea Dragons of the XFL.

== Early life ==
Smith attended West Rowan High School in Mount Ulla, North Carolina. As a senior, he had 98 tackles and 16.5 sacks.

== College career ==
As a true freshman in 2010, Smith played in six games, recording three tackles. As a sophomore in 2011, he played in 13 games with three starts. He had 31 tackles and 3.5 sacks. As a junior in 2012, he started all 12 games, recording 52 tackles and 9.5 sacks. As a senior in 2013, he had 37 tackles and 8.5 sacks in 12 games.

As a senior in 2013, Smith was a second-team All-Southeastern Conference (SEC) selection.

== Professional career ==
Pre-draft measurables
| Height | Weight | Arm length | Hand span | Wingspan | 40-yard dash | 10-yard split | 20-yard split | 20-yard shuttle | Three-cone drill | Vertical jump | Broad jump | Bench press |
|---|---|---|---|---|---|---|---|---|---|---|---|---|
| 6 ft 1 in (1.85 m) | 266 lb (121 kg) | 34 1/8 in (0.87 m) | 9 1/2 in (0.24 m) | 6 ft 11 1/8 in (2.11 m) | 4.71 s | 1.68 s | 2.74 s | 4.46 s | 7.37 s | 37.0 in (0.94 m) | 10 ft 1 in (3.07 m) | 28 reps |
All values from NFL Combine/Pro Day

=== Jacksonville Jaguars ===
Smith was selected 159th overall in the fifth round of the 2014 NFL draft by the Jacksonville Jaguars. The pick that was used to select Smith was acquired in a trade that sent Eugene Monroe to the Baltimore Ravens.

Smith was released by the Jaguars on September 13, 2014. Two days later, he was signed to their practice squad. He was promoted to the active roster on October 20.

=== Cincinnati Bengals ===
On April 11, 2017, the Jaguars traded Smith to the Cincinnati Bengals in exchange for a 2018 conditional draft pick. He played in all 16 games in 2017, recording a career-high 26 tackles and three sacks.

=== Cleveland Browns ===
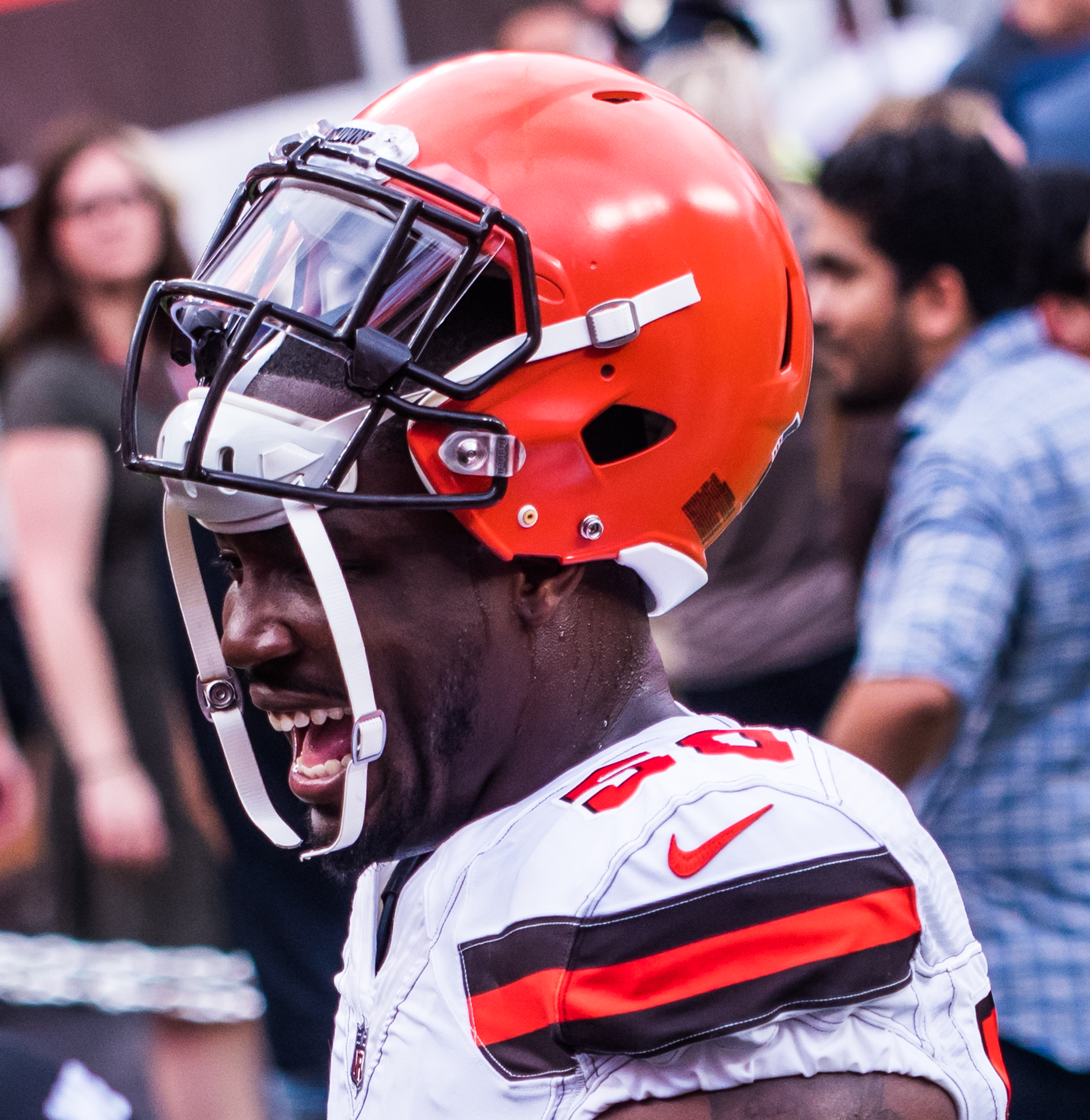
Smith with the Cleveland Browns in 2018

On March 14, 2018, Smith signed a three-year contract with the Cleveland Browns. He played in 16 games with two starts, recording 21 combined tackles, one sack, two passes defensed, and a forced fumble.

On December 3, 2019, Smith was waived by the Browns. He played in nine games, recording one tackle during the season.

=== Carolina Panthers ===
On March 5, 2020, Smith signed a one-year contract with the Carolina Panthers. He was released on July 30, 2020.

=== Las Vegas Raiders ===
Smith had a tryout with the Las Vegas Raiders on August 23, 2020, and signed with the team the next day. He was released on September 5, 2020, and signed to the team's practice squad the following day. He was elevated to the active roster on October 10, October 31, November 7, November 21, and November 28 for the team's weeks 5, 8, 9, 11, and 12 games against the Kansas City Chiefs, Cleveland Browns, Los Angeles Chargers, Chiefs, and Atlanta Falcons, and reverted to the practice squad after each game. He was signed to the active roster on December 12, 2020.

=== Baltimore Ravens ===
On July 27, 2021, Smith signed a one-year contract with the Ravens. He was released on August 31, 2021, and signed to the team's practice squad the next day. He was released on October 19, 2021.

=== Houston Texans ===
On November 3, 2021, Smith was signed to the Houston Texans' practice squad. He was promoted to the active roster on December 23, 2021.

=== Seattle Sea Dragons ===
Smith signed with the Seattle Sea Dragons of the XFL on March 9, 2023. He played in five games for the Dragons during the 2023 season and posted five tackles.

== Personal life ==
On September 11, 2019, Petara Cordero, Smith's girlfriend and the mother of one of his children was killed after being struck by a passing car after exiting Smith's car, which had become disabled after hitting a median.

== Death ==
Smith died on April 17, 2023, at the age of 31, six days before the Sea Dragons' regular season finale. The cause is still unknown.

== See also ==
- List of gridiron football players who died during their careers
