= John Milem =

American football player (born 1975)

No. 93, 99, 98
- Position: Defensive end

Personal information
- Born: June 9, 1975 (age 51); Concord, North Carolina, U.S.
- Listed height: 6 ft 7 in (2.01 m)
- Listed weight: 290 lb (132 kg)

Career information
- High school: West Rowan (Mount Ulla, North Carolina)
- College: Lenoir–Rhyne (1994–1999)
- NFL draft: 2000: 5th round, 150th overall pick

Career history
- San Francisco 49ers (2000–2001); Carolina Panthers (2001)

Career NFL statistics
- Games played: 20
- Tackles: 14
- Passes defended: 1
- Stats at Pro Football Reference

John Ray Milem (born June 9, 1975) is an American former professional football player who was a defensive end in the National Football League (NFL). He was selected by the San Francisco 49ers in the fifth round of the 2000 NFL draft. He played college football for the Lenoir–Rhyne Bears.
