= Geert Hammink =

Dutch basketball player (born 1969)

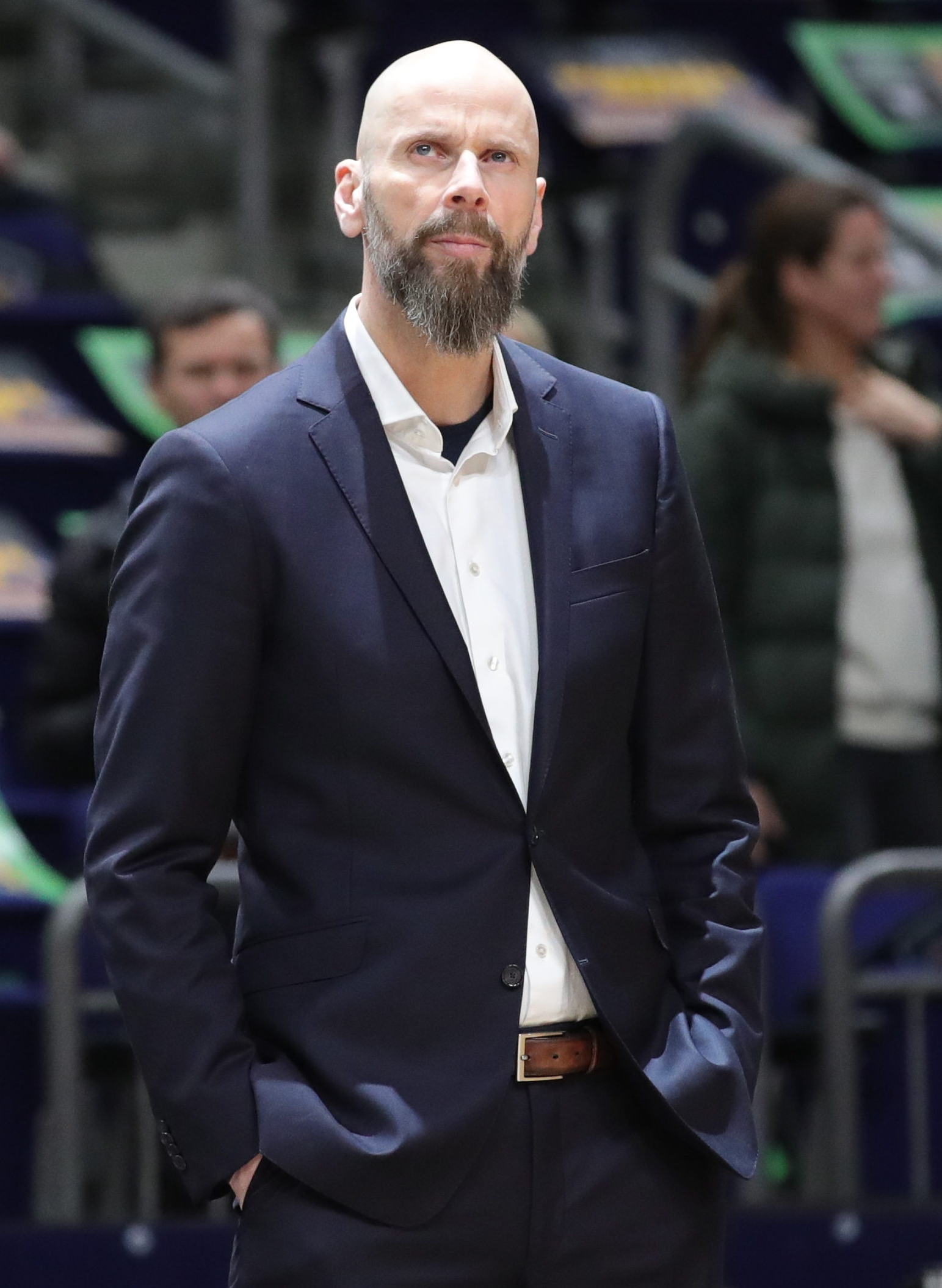
- Hammink in 2023

Personal information
- Born: 12 July 1969 (age 57) Didam, Netherlands
- Listed height: 7 ft 0 in (2.13 m)
- Listed weight: 262 lb (119 kg)

Career information
- College: LSU (1988–1993)
- NBA draft: 1993: 1st round, 26th overall pick
- Drafted by: Orlando Magic
- Playing career: 1993–2004
- Position: Center
- Number: 43
- Coaching career: 2018–present

Career history

Playing
- 1993–1994: Shampoo Clear Cantù
- 1994–1995: Orlando Magic
- 1996: Omaha Racers
- 1996: Golden State Warriors
- 1996–1997: Panionios
- 1997–2000: Alba Berlin
- 2000–2001: AEK Athens
- 2001–2002: Aris
- 2002–2004: Köln 99ers

Coaching
- 2018–2019: Dutch Windmills
- 2020–2022: ZZ Leiden
- 2022–2023: Skyliners Frankfurt
- 2024: Antwerp Giants

Career highlights
- As player: 3× BBL champion (1998–2000); 2× German Cup champion (1999, 2004); Greek Cup champion (2001); BBL All-Star (2004); First-team All-SEC (1993); As head coach: BNXT League champion (2022); BNXT Dutch Coach of the Year (2022); DBL champion (2021); DBL Coach of the Year (2021)
- Stats at NBA.com
- Stats at Basketball Reference

Geert Hendrik Hammink (born 12 July 1969) is a Dutch former basketball player and current coach. On 1 July 2025 it was announced that he will be the next coach of Romania's CSU Sibiu. He was selected by the Orlando Magic in the first round (26th overall) of the 1993 NBA draft. Hammink played for the Magic and had a small stint with the Golden State Warriors in 3 NBA seasons. In his NBA career, Hammink appeared in 8 games and scored a total of 14 points. He played college basketball for the LSU Tigers.

He had a small role as a member of the Indiana Hoosiers basketball team in the movie Blue Chips.

== Coaching career ==
=== Dutch Windmills ===
On 6 July 2018, Hammink was appointed as head coach of the Dutch Windmills, which made its debut season in the Dutch Basketball League (DBL). Despite reaching the semi-finals of the NBB Cup and being in fifth place in the DBL standings, Windmills struggled with financial problems throughout the season. In December 2018, Windmills was refused entrance to its home arena due to its payment arrears. On 10 April 2019, the league decided and announced that Windmills would be withdrawn from the DBL. Its results in the second half of the competition were scrapped by the DBL.

=== ZZ Leiden ===
On 17 May 2020, Hammink signed a one-year contract as head coach of ZZ Leiden. Leiden finished in first place with a 17–4 record and Hammink was named the DBL Coach of the Year after the regular season. Leiden cruised through the PlayOffs to win the DBL title. Hammink signed a two-year extension in the summer of 2021. In the 21/22 season, he guided Leiden to the championship title in the newly formed BNXT League (Belgian and Dutch leagues merged).

=== Skyliners Frankfurt ===
After his second consecutive title, Hammink agreed with Leiden to leave his contract early and inked a two-year deal with German Bundesliga outfit Skyliners Frankfurt in June 2022.

Hammink was put on administrative leave in March 2023.

=== Antwerp Giants ===
Hammink joined the Antwerp Giants of the BNXT League on June 5, 2024, where he succeeded Ivica Skelin. He was fired after the first game of the season, after the Giants lost to the Den Helder Suns.

=== Baschet Club CSU Sibiu ===
On 1 July 2025, the Romanian team CSU Sibiu announced it had signed Hammink as head coach for the 2025/2026 season.

== Honours ==
=== Playing career ===
==== Club ====
LSU

- 5x NCAA Tournament
- 1x First Team All SEC
- 1993 College All Star Game
- drafted 26th overall in the 1993 NBA draft

Alba Berlin

- 3× Basketball Bundesliga: (1998, 1999, 2000)
- 2× German Cup: (1999, 2004)

AEK Athens

- Greek Cup: (2001)

==== Individual ====
- BBL All-Star: (2004)

=== Coaching career ===
==== Club ====
ZZ Leiden

- Dutch Basketball League Champion: (2021)
- Dutch Supercup Winner: (2021)
- BNXT League Champion: (2022)

==== Individual ====
- DBL Coach of the Year: (2021)
- BNXT League Dutch Coach of the Year: (2022)

== Personal ==
Hammink's Baton Rouge, Louisiana-born sons, Shane Hammink, and twins Ryan Hammink and Nick Hammink, were also professional basketball players. Shane Hammink played for Canarias Basketball Academy in Spain's Canary Islands, was a member of the LSU Tigers basketball team and Valparaiso Crusaders men's basketball team. He was considered one of the top players in Europe prior to college.
