= Dutch Windmills =

- Founded: 2017
- Dissolved: 2019
- Arena: Sportboulevard Dordrecht
- Capacity: 1,100
- Location: Dordrecht, Netherlands
- Website: www.dutchwindmills.net
Home	Away

Dutch Windmills was a professional basketball club based in Dordrecht, Netherlands. The club was founded in 2017 and entered the Dutch Basketball League for the 2018–19 season. In April of the same season, the club withdrew from the league due to financial problems. Home games of the club were played at the Sportboulevard Dordrecht, which has a capacity for 1,100 people.

== History ==
On 14 September 2017, the establishment of the club Dutch Windmills was announced along with the intention to enter the Dutch Basketball League for the 2017–18 season. On 3 May 2018, the DBL officially announced the team's participation in the upcoming season. On 6 July, Geert Hammink was appointed as head coach. Windmills played its debut game in the DBL on 7 October 2018, and lost 64–78 to Landstede Zwolle.

Despite reaching the semi-finals of the NBB Cup and being in the fifth place in the DBL, Windmills struggled with financial problems throughout the season. In December 2018, Windmills was refused entrance to its home arena due to its payment arrears. On 10 April 2019, it was announced that Windmills would withdraw from the DBL. Its results in the second half of the competition were scrapped by the DBL.

== Season by season ==
Season	Tier	League	Pos.	NBB Cup	Records		
Season	Tier	League	Pos.	NBB Cup	RS	PO	CU
2018–19	1	DBL	–^{1}	Semi-finals	10–8	–	2–2

^1 The club was disqualified from the league.

== Players ==
=== 2018–19 roster ===
Note: Flags indicate national team eligibility at FIBA-sanctioned events. Players may hold other non-FIBA nationalities not displayed.

Dutch Windmills roster
Players
Coaches

Pos.	No.	Nat.	Name	Ht.	Wt.	Age
PG	16	(United States)	Dority, LaVonte
SF	9	(Netherlands)	Roessink, Hidde
PF	12	(Netherlands)	Versteeg, Floris	2.01 m (6 ft 7 in)	98 kg (216 lb)	30 – 22 October 1994
PF	15	(United States)	Coleman, Shavon
SG	3	(Netherlands)	Topalovic, Stefan
G	4	(United States)	Richardson, Ryan
PG	2	(United States)	Wintering, Alec (injured)
G	5	(Netherlands)	van Overbeek, Roel
SF	7	(Netherlands)	de Vries, Pim
C	13	(Netherlands)	Kok, Jito	2.06 m (6 ft 9 in)	105 kg (231 lb)	30 – 23 March 1994
PF	10	(United States)	Koch, Bennett	2.08 m (6 ft 10 in)	107 kg (236 lb)	29 – 23 May 1995

Head coach

- (Netherlands) Geert Hammink

Legend

- (C) Team captain
- Injured

- Roster
Updated: 4 December 2018

=== Individual awards ===
DBL All-Rookie Team

- Jito Kok – 2019
- Nick Hammink – 2019

== Head coaches ==
Coach	From	To
(Netherlands) Geert Hammink	2018	2019
