= Zeek Biggers =

American football player (born 2003)

No. 93 – Miami Dolphins
- Position: Defensive tackle
- Roster status: Injured reserve

Personal information
- Born: October 4, 2003 (age 23); Salisbury, North Carolina, U.S.
- Listed height: 6 ft 6 in (1.98 m)
- Listed weight: 315 lb (143 kg)

Career information
- High school: West Rowan (Mount Ulla, North Carolina)
- College: Georgia Tech (2021–2024)
- NFL draft: 2025: 7th round, 253rd overall pick

Career history
- Miami Dolphins (2025–present)

Career NFL statistics as of Week 10, 2026
- Tackles: 38
- Sacks: 2.5
- Pass deflections: 1
- Stats at Pro Football Reference

Zeek Biggers (born October 4, 2003) is an American professional football defensive tackle for the Miami Dolphins of the National Football League (NFL). He played college football for the Georgia Tech Yellow Jackets and was selected by the Dolphins in the seventh round of the 2025 NFL draft.

== Early life ==
Biggers attended West Rowan High School located in Mount Ulla Township, Rowan County, North Carolina. He was rated as a four-star recruit and committed to play college football for the Georgia Tech Yellow Jackets over offers such as Akron, Georgia State, NC State, and Temple.

== College career ==
As a freshman in 2021, Biggers appeared in nine games for the Yellow Jackets where he notched nine tackles with one being for a loss. In 2022, he tallied 32 tackles with one being for a loss. During the 2023 season, Biggers totaled 40 tackles with four being for a loss, a sack, three pass deflections, a fumble recovery, and a blocked kick. In his final collegiate season in 2024, he recorded 23 tackles with four being for a loss, a sack, three pass deflections, and a fumble recovery, earning an invite to play in the 2025 East-West Shrine Bowl.

== Professional career ==
Pre-draft measurables
| Height | Weight | Arm length | Hand span | Wingspan | 40-yard dash | 10-yard split | 20-yard split | 20-yard shuttle | Three-cone drill | Vertical jump | Broad jump | Bench press |
|---|---|---|---|---|---|---|---|---|---|---|---|---|
| 6 ft 5 1/2 in (1.97 m) | 321 lb (146 kg) | 34 7/8 in (0.89 m) | 10 1/4 in (0.26 m) | 7 ft 1 1/8 in (2.16 m) | 5.14 s | 1.74 s | 2.93 s | 4.75 s | 7.91 s | 34.5 in (0.88 m) | 9 ft 5 in (2.87 m) | 22 reps |
All values from NFL Combine/Pro Day

The Miami Dolphins selected Biggers with the 253rd overall pick in the seventh round of the 2025 NFL draft.
