= Tim Hoeve =

Dutch basketball player

No. 21 – Basket Corato
- Position: Guard
- League: Serie B Basket

Personal information
- Born: May 15, 1998 (age 28) Groningen, Groningen, Netherlands
- Listed height: 6 ft 5 in (1.96 m)

Career information
- Playing career: 2020–present

Career history
- 2016–2019: Donar
- 2019–2023: LWD Basket
- 2023–2024: Landstede Hammers
- 2024–2026: Donar
- 2026–present: Basket Corato

Career highlights
- 3x Dutch Cup winner (2017, 2018, 2026); 2x Dutch League champion (2017, 2018); Dutch Supercup winner (2018)

Tim Hoeve (born May 15, 1998) is a Dutch professional basketball player for Basket Corato in the Serie B Basket.

== Professional career ==
Hoeve started his career in 2016 with Donar after coming up through its youth academy.

In 2019, Hoeve made the transfer to Aris Leeuwarden due to limited playing minutes in Groningen.

In 2023 he made the switch to Landstede Hammers. With Landstede Hammers he reached the 2024 cup finals, but lost against Heroes Den Bosch.

In 2024 he switched back to his youth club Donar for 1 year. That year Donar reached the cup final, but lost against Heroes Den Bosch.

He renewed his contract with Donar for another year in 2025. That year, he reached the cup finals for a third year in a row, winning the Dutch Cup again.

For the 2026–27 season, Hoeve could not obtain a contract extension at Donar. He therefore moved to the Italian club Basket Corato in the Serie B Basket.
