= West Rowan High School =

American public school in North Carolina

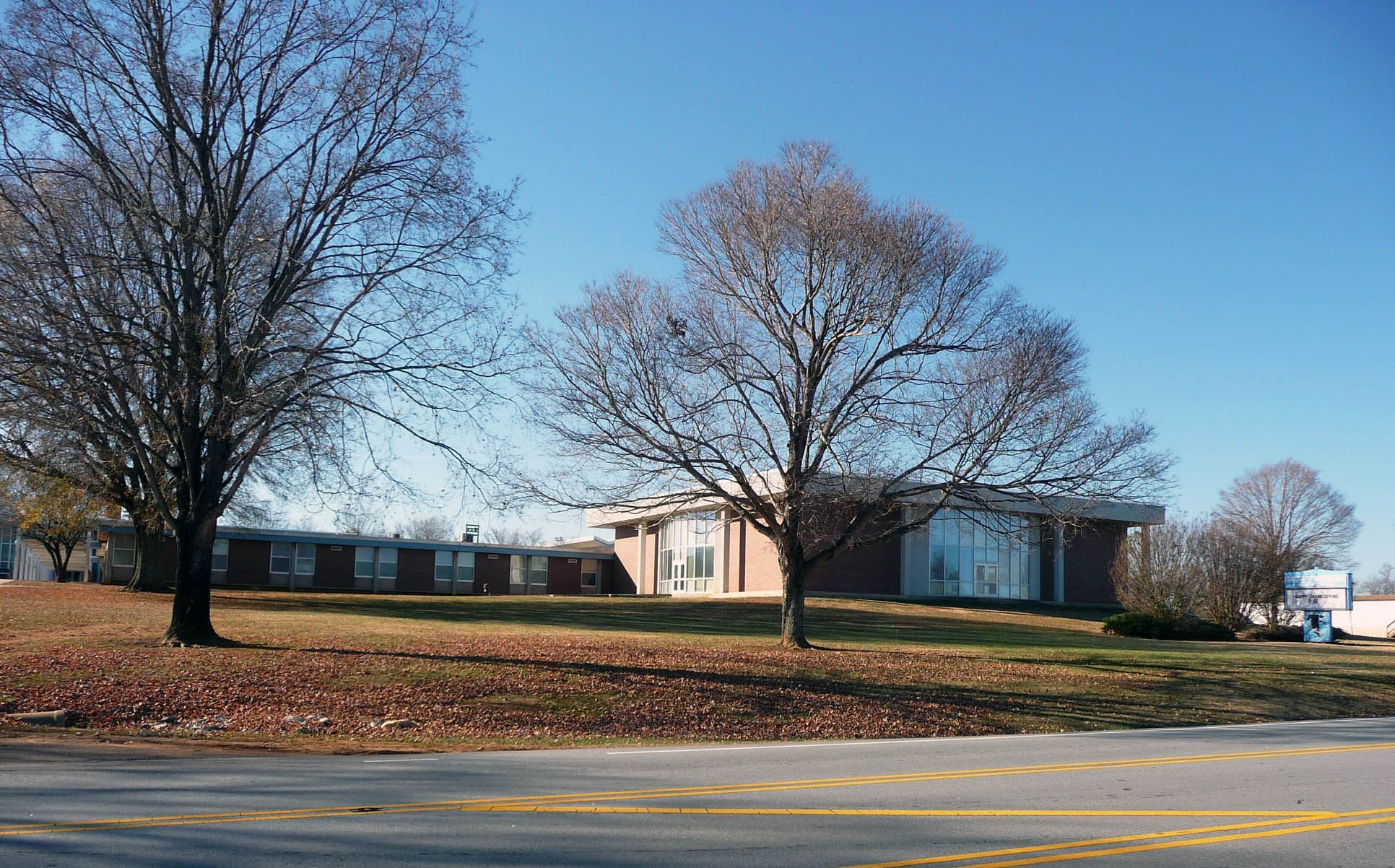
- Front of West Rowan High from North Carolina Highway 801

Location
- 8050 NC 801 Highway; Mount Ulla, North Carolina 28125; United States; 35°41′57″N 80°38′36″W

Information
- Type: Public
- Established: 1960 (66 years ago)
- CEEB code: 342810
- NCES School ID: 370405001630
- Principal: Dylan Johnson
- Teaching staff: 57.57 (FTE)
- Enrollment: 1,105 (2023–24)
- Student to teacher ratio: 19.19
- Campus type: Rural
- Colors: Light blue and white
- Athletics conference: South Piedmont Conference
- Nickname: Falcons
- Accreditation: Blue Ribbon 1990–1991
- Yearbook: Westwind
- Website: https://wrhs.rssed.org

West Rowan High School is a public, co-educational secondary school located in Mount Ulla, North Carolina, United States. It is one of seven high schools in the Rowan-Salisbury School System.

== School information ==
For the 2010–2011 school year, West Rowan High School had a total population of 1,154 students and 68.57 teachers on a (FTE) basis. The student population had a gender ratio of 51.96% male to 48.04% female. The demographic group makeup of the student population was: White, 64.02%; Black, 22.10%; Hispanic, 10.78%; Asian/Pacific Islander, 0.37%; and American Indian, 0.27% (two or more races, 2.47%). For the same school year, 48.95% of the students received free or reduced-cost lunches.

== Athletics ==
The West Rowan High School Falcons compete in the South Piedmont Conference, an athletic conference made up of 9 nearby high schools. The league operates under the jurisdiction of the North Carolina High School Athletic Association (NCHSAA).

The school's men's basketball team has won three state titles overall, including consecutive championships in 2002 & 2003. In 2023 and 2024, the women's basketball team won two 3A state championships, against Rocky Mount High School and Terry Sanford High School.

From 2008 to 2010, the football team won three straight State 3A Championships. They made it to the State Championship in 2011, where they lost to Havelock. They went undefeated in 2009 and 2010, and had a 46-game winning streak that was broken in 2011.

== Notable alumni ==
- Barry Moore (1961), MLB pitcher
- Dave Drechsler (1978), NFL offensive guard
- John Milem (1994), NFL defensive end
- Kevin Parks (2010), professional American football running back
- Chris Smith (2010), NFL defensive end
- Keshun Sherrill (2013), professional basketball player
- Zeek Biggers (2021), NFL defensive tackle for the Miami Dolphins
