= Jobi Wall =

American basketball player (born 1989)

Personal information
- Born: September 12, 1989 (age 37)
- Listed height: 6 ft 6 in (1.98 m)
- Listed weight: 215 lb (98 kg)

Career information
- High school: Faith Christian Academy (Arvada, Colorado)
- College: Colorado Christian (2008–2010); Seattle Pacific (2011–2013)
- NBA draft: 2013: undrafted
- Playing career: 2013–present
- Position: Power forward

Career history
- 2013–2014: CAB Madeira
- 2014–2017: Pardubice
- 2017–2018: Legia Warsaw
- 2018–2019: Donar
- 2019: Lakeside Lightning

Career highlights
- Dutch Supercup champion (2018); Czech Cup champion (2016); Second-team All-GNAC (2013); First-team All-RMAC East Division (2010)

Joseph "Jobi" Wall (born September 12, 1989) is an American professional basketball player who last played for the Lakeside Lightning of the State Basketball League (SBL).

== College career ==
Wall first attended Colorado Christian before an injury forced him to miss the majority of the 2010–11 season. At the end of the season, he transferred to Seattle Pacific.

== Professional career ==
Wall started his professional career in Portugal with CAB Madeira, where he spent the 2013–14 season. He went on to spend three seasons in the Czech Republic with Pardubice between 2014 and 2017, where he won the Czech Cup in 2016. He moved to Poland for the 2017–18 season, where he played for Legia Warsaw.

On July 6, 2018, Wall signed with Donar of the Dutch Basketball League. In January 2019, the club terminated his contract. He subsequently moved to Australia to the play for the Lakeside Lightning of the State Basketball League.
