= Grant Sitton =

American basketball player

No. 0 – Saitama Broncos
- Position: Power forward
- League: B.League

Personal information
- Born: April 27, 1993 (age 33) Brush Prairie, Washington, U.S.
- Listed height: 2.06 m (6 ft 9 in)
- Listed weight: 175 lb (79 kg)

Career information
- High school: Prairie (Vancouver, Washington)
- College: Clackamas CC (2013–2014); Victoria (2014–2017)
- NBA draft: 2017: undrafted
- Playing career: 2017–present

Career history
- 2017–2018: Prievidza
- 2018–2019: Donar
- 2019–2020: Rostock Seawolves
- 2020–2021: Prievidza
- 2021–2022: Panthers Schwenningen
- 2022–2023: Saitama Broncos
- 2023–2024: Yokohama Excellence
- 2024–present: Saitama Broncos

Career highlights
- Dutch Supercup champion (2018)

Grant Sitton (born April 27, 1993) is an American professional basketball player for Saitama Broncos of the Japanese B.League. Standing at 2.06 m (6 ft 9 in), he usually plays at the power forward position.

== College career ==
Sitton played college basketball for Clackamas Community College in the 2013–14 season and University of Victoria from 2014 until 2017. In the 2015–16 season, Sitton averaged 14.4 points and 4.9 rebounds per game, while shooting 82.7% from the free throw line. In the 2014–15 season, Sitton helped lead Victoria to the CanWest championship and the CIS Final 8 Tournament semifinals.

== Professional career ==
In 2017, Sitton signed his first professional contract with Slowakian side Prievidza. He played 37 games in the Slovak Basketball League, averaging 14.2 points and 4.8 rebounds per game.

On July 19, 2018, Sitton signed a one-year deal with Donar, defending champions of the Dutch Basketball League (DBL). With Donar, he reached the round of 16 of the FIBA Europe Cup. In the DBL, the team finished as runners-up.

On July 23, 2019, Sitton signed a one-year contract with Rostock Seawolves of the German ProA.

On July 19, 2021, Sitton signed with Panthers Schwenningen.

On June 19, 2023, Sitton signed with Yokohama Excellence of the B.League.

On May 28, 2024, Sitton signed with Saitama Broncos of the B.League.
