= Tayler Persons =

American basketball player (born 1995)

No. 2 – HKK Široki
- Position: Point guard
- League: Basketball Championship of Bosnia and Herzegovina

Personal information
- Born: August 31, 1995 (age 31) Kokomo, Indiana, U.S.
- Listed height: 6 ft 3 in (1.91 m)
- Listed weight: 94 kg (207 lb)

Career information
- High school: Kokomo (Kokomo, Indiana)
- College: Northern Kentucky (2014–2015); Ball State (2016–2019)
- NBA draft: 2019: undrafted
- Playing career: 2019–present

Career history
- 2019–2020: ZZ Leiden
- 2020–2021: s.Oliver Würzburg
- 2021: GTK Gliwice
- 2021–2022: Szedeák
- 2022–2023: Élan Chalon
- 2023: Twarde Pierniki Toruń
- 2023–2024: MKS Dąbrowa Górnicza
- 2024–2025: Krka
- 2025: Bosna
- 2025–2026: Twarde Pierniki Toruń
- 2026–present: HKK Široki

Career highlights
- ABA League assists leader (2025); Alpe Adria Cup Final Four MVP (2024); PLK assists leader (2024); DBL assists leader (2020)

Tayler Anthony Persons (born August 31, 1995) is an American basketball player for HKK Široki of the Basketball Championship of Bosnia and Herzegovina. Standing at 6 ft 3 in (1.91 m), he plays as point guard. Persons played college basketball for Northern Kentucky and Ball State.

== College career ==
Persons played his freshman season at Northern Kentucky. He averaged 13.1 points, 4.6 rebounds and 3.7 assists per game and was named Atlantic Sun Freshman of the Year. Following the season, he transferred to Ball State. Persons was the first player ever for the Ball State Cardinals to finish his career with 1,000 points and 400 assists. He left the Cardinals as ninth leading scorer all-time and third highest assists total. As a senior, he led Ball State in scoring at 16.7 points per game and in assists at 4.3 per game, and was named to the Third Team All-MAC.

== Professional career ==
On July 17, 2019, Persons signed a one-year contract with ZZ Leiden of the Dutch Basketball League (DBL). The 2019–20 season was prematurely abandoned in March after the COVID-19 pandemic outbreak. Persons finished the season as the assists leader in the league. He averaged 18.6 points, 4.5 rebounds, 8.1 assists and 1.5 steals per game and was named to the All-FIBA Europe Cup team.

On July 8, 2020, he has signed with s.Oliver Würzburg of the Basketball Bundesliga.

On January 9, 2021, he has signed with GTK Gliwice of the PLK. Persons averaged 13.4 points, 4.3 rebounds, 5.8 assists and 1.2 steals per game. On August 20, 2021, he signed with Szedeák of the Nemzeti Bajnokság I/A.

On August 24, 2022, he has signed with Élan Chalon of the French Pro B.

On February 19, 2023, he signed with Twarde Pierniki Toruń of the Polish Basketball League (PLK).

On July 22, 2024, he signed with Krka of the Slovenian First League.

On July 2, 2025, he signed with Bosna Royal of the Bosnian League.

On November 13, 2025, he signed with Twarde Pierniki Toruń of the Polish Basketball League (PLK) for a second stint.

=== The Basketball Tournament ===
Persons joined War Tampa, a team composed primarily of Auburn alumni in The Basketball Tournament 2020. He scored four points in a 76–53 loss to House of 'Paign in the first round.

== Honours ==
=== Individual ===
- DBL assists leader: 2019–20
