= Jarvis Williams (basketball) =

American basketball player

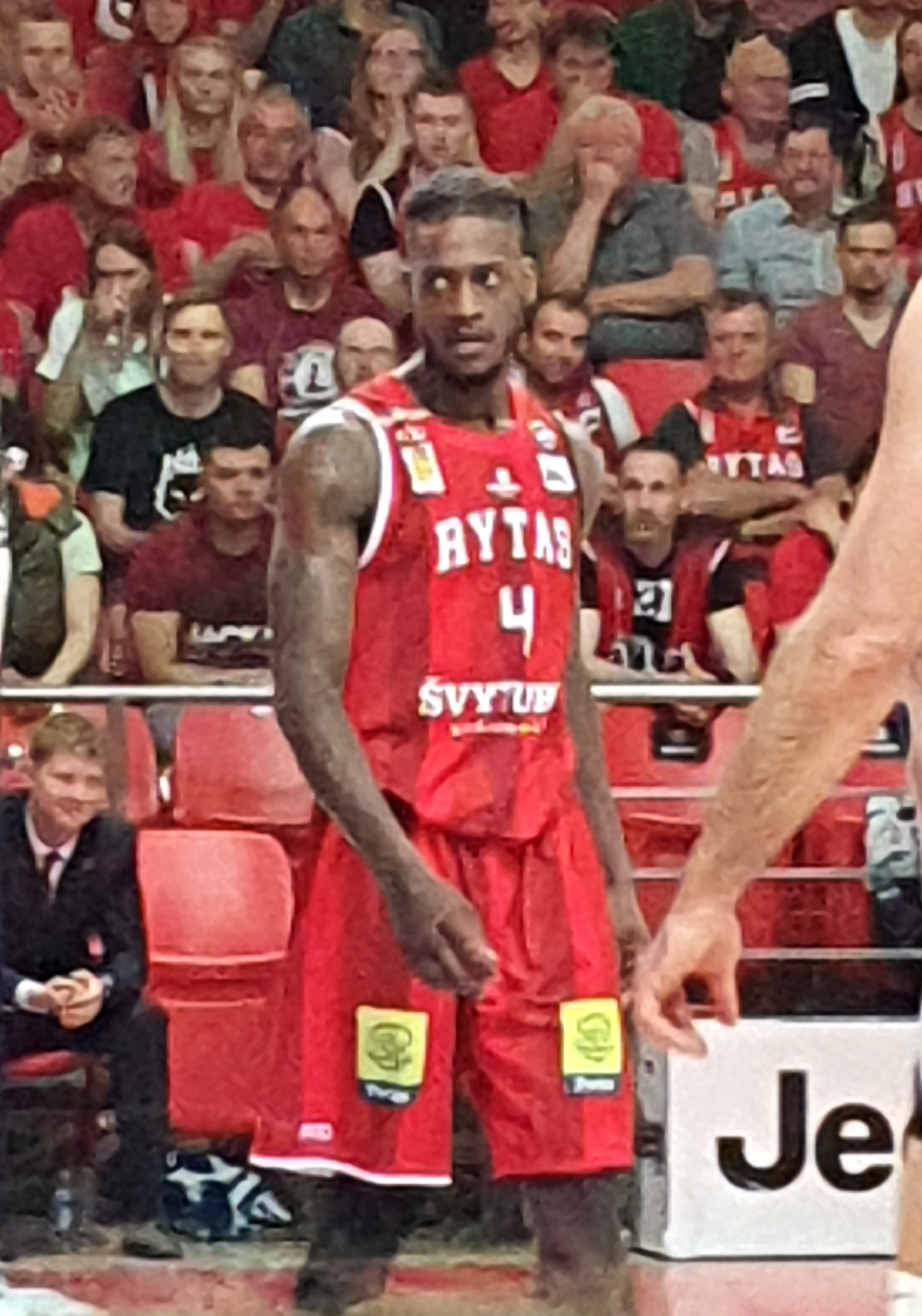
- Williams with Rytas Vilnius in 2022

No. 0 – Club Central Jounieh
- Position: Power forward / center
- League: Lebanese Basketball League

Personal information
- Born: January 21, 1993 (age 33) Macon, Georgia, U.S.
- Listed height: 6 ft 8 in (2.03 m)
- Listed weight: 220 lb (100 kg)

Career information
- High school: Wilkinson County (Irwinton, Georgia)
- College: Gordon State (2011–2013); Murray State (2013–2015)
- NBA draft: 2015: undrafted
- Playing career: 2015–present

Career history
- 2015–2016: Śląsk Wrocław
- 2016: Tofaş
- 2016–2017: Boulazac
- 2017–2018: Caen
- 2018–2019: Rosa Radom
- 2019–2020: ZZ Leiden
- 2020–2021: Vanoli Cremona
- 2021–2023: Rytas Vilnius
- 2024–2025: Hapoel Be'er Sheva
- 2025: Sebastiani Rieti
- 2025–2026: Gruppo Mascio Bergamo
- 2026: Śląsk Wrocław
- 2026: Al Riyadi Club Beirut
- 2026–present: Club Central Jounieh

Career highlights
- Lithuanian League champion (2022)

Reigarvius Jacquez "Jarvis" Williams (born January 21, 1993) is an American professional basketball player for Club Central Jounieh of the Lebanese Basketball League (LBL). Standing at 6 ft 8 in (2.03 m), he plays at the power forward and center positions.

== Professional career ==
On August 7, 2019, Williams signed a one-year contract with ZZ Leiden of the Dutch Basketball League (DBL).

Exactly two years later, on August 7, 2020, Williams signed a one-year contract in Italy for Vanoli Cremona. He averaged 12.4 points, 8.3 rebounds and 1 steal per game.

On July 23, 2021, Williams signed with Rytas Vilnius of the Lithuanian Basketball League (LKL) and the Champions League. On March 8, 2023, he parted ways with the team.

On January 24, 2024, Williams signed with Hapoel Be'er Sheva of the Israeli Basketball Premier League.

On December 14, 2025, Williams signed with Gruppo Mascio Bergamo of Serie A2.

On March 2, 2026, he signed with Śląsk Wrocław of the Polish Basketball League (PLK).
