= Stephen Ugochukwu =

American basketball player (born 1996)

Free agent
- Position: Power forward

Personal information
- Born: March 22, 1996 (age 30) Lewisville, Texas
- Listed height: 2.01 m (6 ft 7 in)
- Listed weight: 100 kg (220 lb)

Career information
- High school: Carrollton Christian Academy (Carrollton, Texas); Liberty Christian (Argyle, Texas)
- College: McNeese (2014–2018)
- NBA draft: 2018: undrafted
- Playing career: 2018–present

Career history
- 2018: Soles de Mexicali
- 2019: Texas Legends
- 2019: Northern Arizona Suns
- 2020–2021: Cantabria
- 2021–2022: Navarra
- 2022: Södertälje Kings
- 2022–2023: Enosis Neon Paralimni
- 2023: Al Ahli Doha
- 2023–2024: Ermis Schimatari
- 2024–2025: Cartagena
- 2025–2026: Palencia

Stephen Ugochukwu (born March 22, 1996) is an American professional basketball player who last played for Palencia of the Primera FEB.

== High school career ==
Ugochukwu played basketball for Carrollton Christian Academy in Carrollton, Texas and for Liberty Christian in Argyle, Texas. As a junior, he averaged 20.3 points and 11.5 rebounds per game.

== College career ==
During his college career, Ugochukwu played for McNeese. As a senior, he averaged 8 points and 5.4 rebounds per game.

== Professional career ==
After going undrafted in the 2018 NBA draft, Ugochukwu signed with the Soles de Mexicali in Mexico. He later had a brief stint with the Texas Legends.

The following season, after a short stint with the Northern Arizona Suns, he played with Cantabria in Spain.

On August 9, 2023, Ugochukwu joined Marousi of the Greek Basket League. On September 26, 2023, he parted ways with the club after the completion of the preseason. On November 4, 2023, Ugochukwu joined Ermis Schimatari of the Greek A2 Basket League.

After joining Palencia Baloncesto in the Primera FEB in August 2025, Ugochukwu reached an agreement to terminate his contract in February 2026.
