= Floris Versteeg =

Dutch basketball player

Free agent
- Position: Power forward

Personal information
- Born: 22 October 1994 (age 32) Amsterdam, Netherlands
- Listed height: 2.02 m (6 ft 8 in)
- Listed weight: 98 kg (216 lb)

Career information
- College: Cal State Fullerton (2013–2014)
- NBA draft: 2016: undrafted
- Playing career: 2016–present

Career history
- 2014–2018: ZZ Leiden
- 2018–2019: Dutch Windmills
- 2019–2021: Apollo Amsterdam

Floris Versteeg (born 22 October 1994) is a Dutch basketball player who last played for Apollo Amsterdam of the Dutch Basketball League (DBL). Standing at 2.06 m (6 ft 9 in), Versteeg plays as power forward.

== College career ==
Versteeg attended and played for the Canarias Basketball Academy, which he followed by playing one season of college basketball for Cal State Fullerton Titans men's basketball team.

== Professional career ==
On 9 July 2018, Versteeg signed with Dutch Windmills, which made its debut season in the DBL. On 10 April 2019, Windmills withdrew from the DBL due to its financial problems.

He signed with Apollo Amsterdam in August 2019. As the captain of the team, he had his best year yet with 11 points per game in the 2019–20 DBL season.
