= Jito Kok =

Dutch basketball player

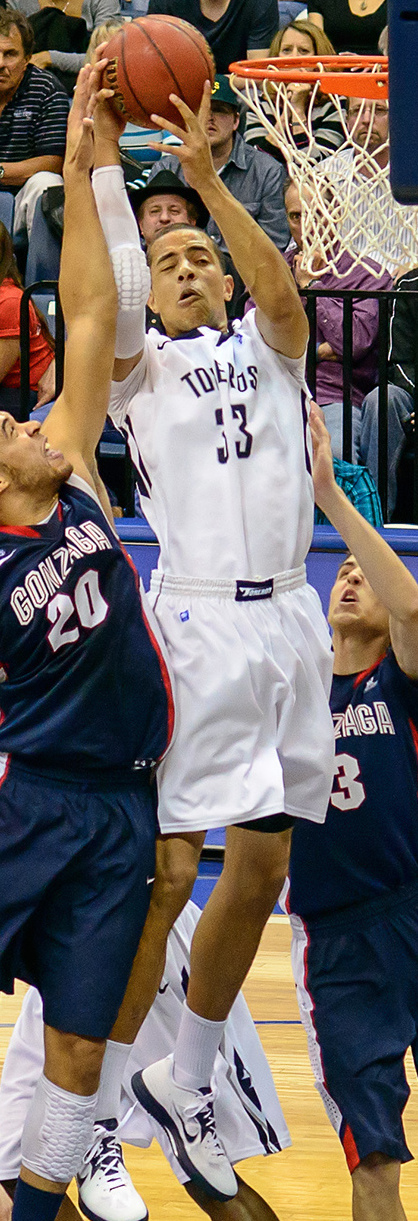
- Kok attempting to dunk for San Diego

Free Agent
- Position: Center / power forward

Personal information
- Born: 23 March 1994 (age 32) Wageningen, Netherlands
- Listed height: 206 cm (6 ft 9 in)
- Listed weight: 105 kg (231 lb)

Career information
- High school: Canarias Basketball Academy (Las Palmas, Gran Canaria)
- College: San Diego (2012–2016)
- NBA draft: 2016: undrafted
- Playing career: 2016–present

Career history
- 2016–2017: Lavrio
- 2017: Rapla
- 2017–2018: CBC Valladolid
- 2018–2019: Dutch Windmills
- 2019–2021: Kangoeroes Mechelen
- 2020: →BG Göttingen
- 2021–2022: Spirou
- 2022–2024: Heroes Den Bosch

Career highlights
- DBL All-Rookie Team (2019); WCC All-Freshman Team (2013)

Jito Kok (born 23 March 1994) is a Dutch professional basketball player who last played for Heroes Den Bosch of the BNXT League. Standing at 206 cm (6 ft 9 in), Kok plays as center. He also plays for the Netherlands national team.

== Professional career ==
On 14 June 2016, Kok signed a one-year deal with Lavrio B.C. of the Greek Basket League. In February 2017, Kok signed with AVIS Rapla of the Estonian KML.

On 11 July 2018, Kok returned to his native country by signing with Dutch Windmills of the Dutch Basketball League (DBL). On 10 April 2019, Windmills withdrew from the DBL due to its financial problems.

On 25 April, Kok signed with Kangoeroes Mechelen. Mechelen was eliminated in the playoff quarterfinals as the eight seed.

On 14 May 2020, Kok signed a temporary contract with BG Göttingen of the German Basketball Bundesliga.

On 20 June 2021 he signed with Spirou of the BNXT League. He averaged 9.4 points, 5.4 rebounds and 1 block per game in 31 games in the 2021–22 season.

On 29 June 2022, Kok signed a two-year contract with the defending Dutch champions Heroes Den Bosch.

== National team career ==
Kok represents the Netherlands national basketball team. On 30 July 2017, Kok was involved in an incident in which he was punched in the face by Italy's Danilo Gallinari during a friendly match.

== Personal life ==
Kok was born in the Netherlands to a Mozambican father and Dutch mother.
