= Darius Thompson =

American-Italian basketball player (born 1995)

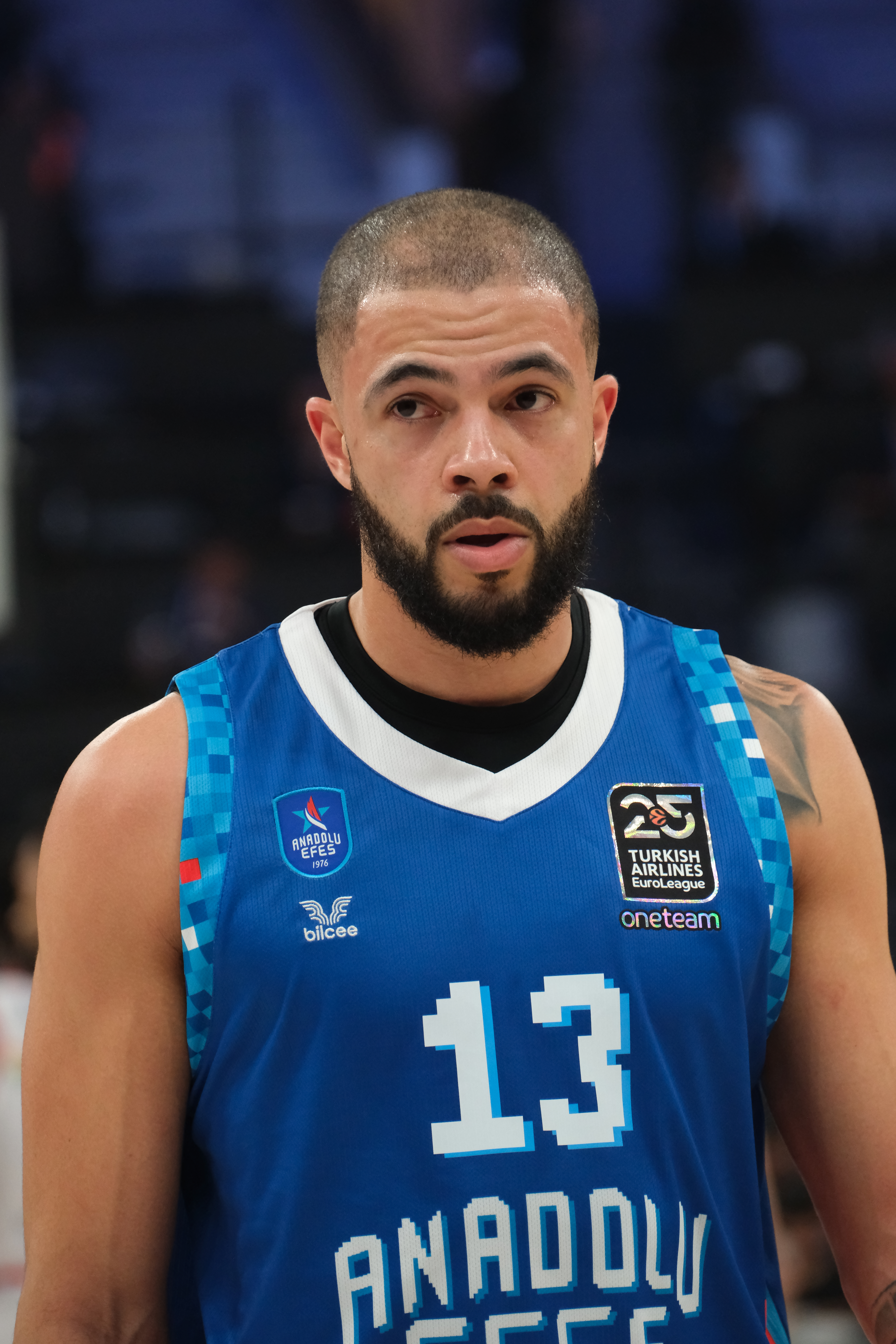
- Thompson with Anadolu Efes in 2025

No. 13 – Olimpia Milano
- Position: Point guard
- League: LBA; EuroLeague

Personal information
- Born: May 4, 1995 (age 31) Murfreesboro, Tennessee, U.S.
- Listed height: 1.93 m (6 ft 4 in)
- Listed weight: 89 kg (196 lb)

Career information
- High school: Blackman (Murfreesboro, Tennessee)
- College: Tennessee (2013–2014); Virginia (2015–2017); Western Kentucky (2017–2018)
- NBA draft: 2017: undrafted
- Playing career: 2017–present

Career history
- 2017–2019: ZZ Leiden
- 2019–2021: Brindisi
- 2021–2022: Lokomotiv Kuban
- 2022–2023: Baskonia
- 2023–2025: Anadolu Efes
- 2025–2026: Valencia
- 2026–present: Olimpia Milano

Career highlights
- All-EuroLeague Second Team (2023); EuroLeague assists leader (2023); All-Champions League Second Team (2021); FIBA Europe Cup Top Scorer (2019); Dutch Cup winner (2019); Liga ACB champion (2026); Spanish Supercup winner (2025); Italian Supercup winner (2026); Dutch League MVP (2019); All-Liga ACB First Team (2023); All-Lega Serie A Team (2021); All-Dutch League Team (2019); Dutch League Top Scorer (2019); Dutch Cup MVP (2019); Second-team All-Conference USA (2018)

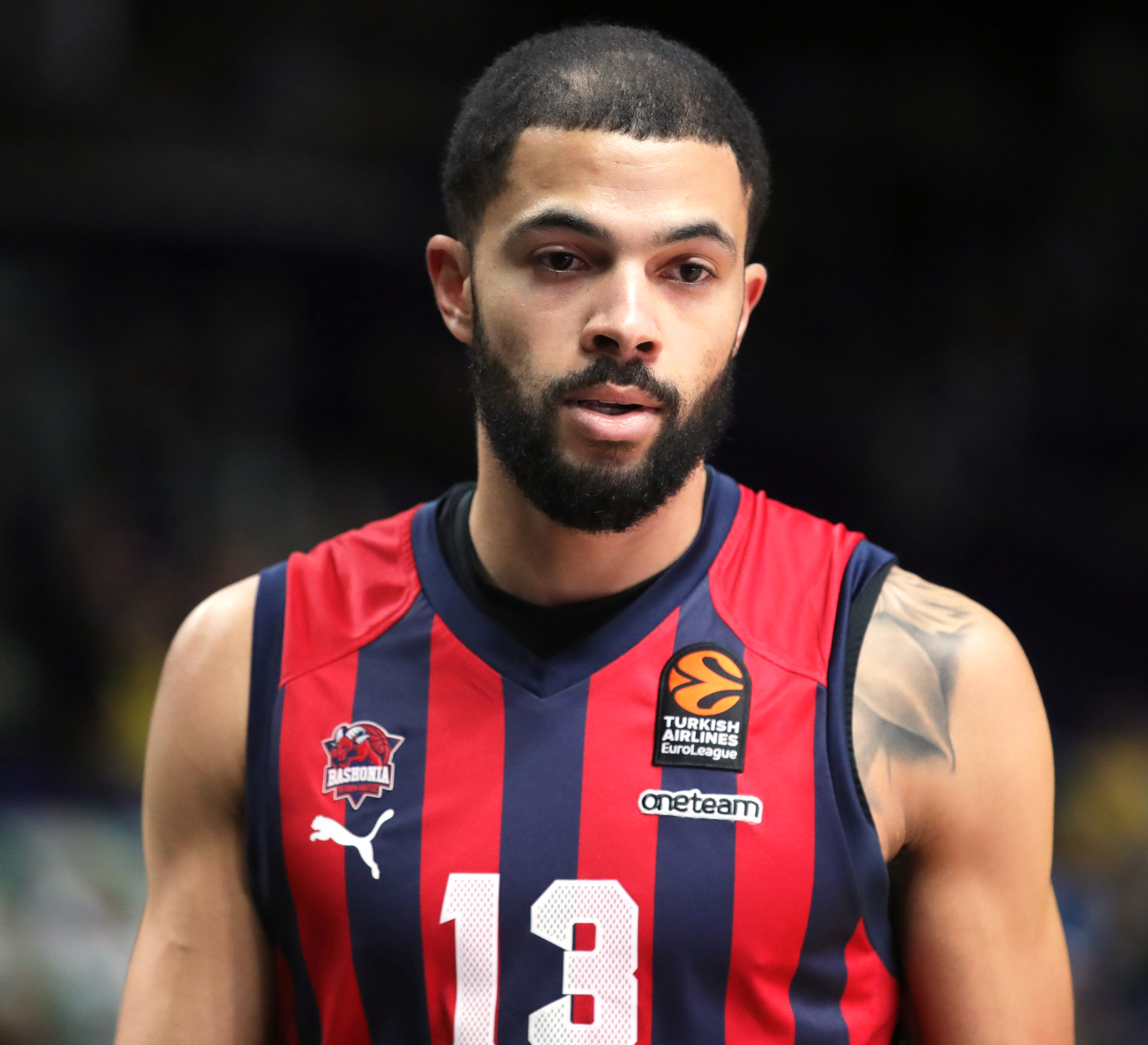
Darius Thompson in 2023

Darius Jamar Thompson (born May 4, 1995) is an American-born naturalized Italian professional basketball player for Olimpia Milano of Italian Lega Basket Serie A (LBA) and the EuroLeague. Standing at 193 cm (6 ft 4 in), he plays at the point guard position. He played college basketball for the Tennessee Volunteers, Virginia Cavaliers and Western Kentucky Hilltoppers.

== Early life ==
Thompson was born in Murfreesboro, Tennessee, and is the son of Lonnie Thompson, who played basketball for Middle Tennessee State, and Felicia Thompson.

Playing for Blackman High School, Thompson was a 2013 McDonald's All-American Game nominee and was ranked the no. 4 best combo guard in the country by 247Sports.com. In his senior year with Blackman, he averaged 16.4 points and 6.4 assists.

== Professional career ==
=== ZZ Leiden ===
In August 2017, Thompson signed a one-year contract with ZZ Leiden of the Dutch Basketball League (DBL) and FIBA Europe Cup. On October 27, 2017, Thompson scored 32 points in a 73–78 win over Den Helder Suns. On November 7, Thompson led Leiden to a win over Sakarya BB in the FIBA Europe Cup by scoring 36 points. On March 31, Thompson won the NBB Cup with Leiden, after scoring 25 points in the final. On April 24, 2019, Thompson won the DBL Most Valuable Player award.

=== Brindisi ===
On July 23, 2019, Thompson signed a one-year contract with an option for a second season with Happy Casa Brindisi of the Italian Lega Basket Serie A (LBA) and Basketball Champions League (BCL).

=== Lokomotiv Kuban ===
On July 1, 2021, Thompson left Brindisi after two years and signed in the VTB United League for the Russian team Lokomotiv Kuban. He left the team after the 2022 Russian invasion of Ukraine. However he said that participation in this team was pleasant.

=== Baskonia ===
On August 12, 2022, Thompson signed a two-year (1+1) contract with Baskonia of the Spanish Liga ACB and the EuroLeague.

Thompson had a breakout season in 2022–23 with Baskonia. He led the EuroLeague in assists per game (averaging 6.7 per game) and was named to the All-EuroLeague Second Team. Thompson was also voted the Best Newcomer by the EuroLeague Players' Association (ELPA).

On July 7, 2023, Thompson parted ways with the Spanish club.

=== Anadolu Efes ===
On July 7, 2023, Thompson signed a three-year (2+1) contract with Turkish powerhouse Anadolu Efes, where he replaced star point guard Vasilije Micić who left the club for the Oklahoma City Thunder.

=== Valencia ===
In July 2025, Thompson signed a three-year deal with Spanish club Valencia Basket. Thompson was still under contract with Anadolu Efes for the 2025–26 season, but both parties finalized a buyout agreement.

=== Olimpia Milano ===
On July 7, 2026, Thompson signed with Olimpia Milano of the Lega Basket Serie A (LBA) and the EuroLeague.

== National team career ==
Thompson has been recruited by the Italy national team, as he is eligible for an Italian passport because of his Italian wife, Chiara Pacifico. He played for the Italian National team during Eurobasket 2025.

== Career statistics ==
Legend
GP	Games played	GS	Games started	MPG	Minutes per game
FG%	Field-goal percentage	3P%	3-point field-goal percentage	FT%	Free-throw percentage
RPG	Rebounds per game	APG	Assists per game	SPG	Steals per game
BPG	Blocks per game	PPG	Points per game	PIR	Performance index rating
**Bold**	Career high

=== EuroLeague ===
*	Led the league

Year	Team	GP	GS	MPG	FG%	3P%	FT%	RPG	APG	SPG	BPG	PPG	PIR
2022–23	Baskonia	34	**33**	**26.9**	**.497**	**.384**	.756	**3.2**	**6.7***	**1.7**	.4	**12.6**	**17.1**
2023–24	Anadolu Efes	**35**	21	26.0	.443	.328	**.838**	2.0	2.8	1.0	**.5**	10.9	9.6
Career		69	54	26.4	.470	.355	.793	2.6	4.7	1.3	.5	11.7	13.3

=== EuroCup ===
Year	Team	GP	GS	MPG	FG%	3P%	FT%	RPG	APG	SPG	BPG	PPG	PIR
2021–22	Lokomotiv Kuban	12	12	29.8	.580	.333	.800	3.0	5.8	1.7	.5	13.2	17.2
Career		12	12	29.8	.580	.333	.800	3.0	5.8	1.7	.5	13.2	17.2

=== Basketball Champions League ===
Year	Team	GP	GS	MPG	FG%	3P%	FT%	RPG	APG	SPG	BPG	PPG
2019–20	Brindisi	**13**	**13**	**27.5**	**.538**	.344	.700	**3.6**	3.5	**1.6**	**.5**	11.6
2020–21	Brindisi	12	12	26.6	.500	**.407**	**.706**	3.0	**4.9**	.7	**.5**	**12.1**
Career		25	25	27.0	.520	.373	.704	3.3	4.2	1.2	.5	11.8

=== FIBA Europe Cup ===
Year	Team	GP	GS	MPG	FG%	3P%	FT%	RPG	APG	SPG	BPG	PPG
2018–19	ZZ Leiden	14	14	37.9	.513	.286	.803	4.8	3.7	2.1	.3	22.2
Career		14	14	37.9	.513	.286	.803	4.8	3.7	2.1	.3	22.2

=== Domestic leagues ===
Year	Team	League	GP	MPG	FG%	3P%	FT%	RPG	APG	SPG	BPG	PPG
2018–19	(Netherlands) ZZ Leiden	DBL	38	35.2	.540	.399	.820	4.1	5.4	2.6	.4	19.0
2019–20	(Italy) Brindisi	LBA	21	26.3	.480	.460	.711	2.6	2.9	1.3	.4	11.6
2020–21	(Italy) Brindisi	LBA	31	28.7	.495	.306	.735	2.9	5.4	1.7	.7	12.7
2021–22	(Russia) Lokomotiv Kuban	VTBUL	11	28.2	.462	.273	.640	4.4	5.7	2.1	.6	9.8
2022–23	(Spain) Baskonia	ACB	34	22.0	.500	.408	.826	2.5	6.1	1.1	.4	10.2
2023–24	(Turkey) Anadolu Efes	TBSL	25	27.7	.498	.412	.717	2.6	4.5	1.1	.5	12.7

=== College ===
Year	Team	GP	GS	MPG	FG%	3P%	FT%	RPG	APG	SPG	BPG	PPG
2013–14	Tennessee	37	10	16.8	.381	.195	.733	2.0	2.4	1.0	.2	2.5
2015–16	Virginia	37	10	17.5	**.537**	**.390**	.722	1.2	1.4	.7	.2	4.3
2016–17	Virginia	33	14	20.8	.448	.351	.605	1.6	2.2	.8	.4	6.2
2017–18	Western Kentucky	**38**	**37**	**35.6**	.463	.355	**.736**	**4.2**	**4.8**	**1.5**	**.5**	**13.6**
Career		145	71	22.8	.461	.338	.712	2.3	2.7	1.0	.3	6.7

== Honors ==
ZZ Leiden

- NBB Cup: 2018–19
- DBL Most Valuable Player: 2018–19
- All-DBL Team: 2018–19
- DBL scoring leader: 2018–19
- DBL Statistical Player of the Year: 2018–19
