= Rolf Franke =

Dutch basketball player and coach

Personal information
- Born: 7 April 1967 (age 59) Amsterdam, Netherlands
- Listed height: 1.98 m (6 ft 6 in)

Career information
- Playing career: 1986–1999
- Position: Forward
- Coaching career: 2009–present

Career history

Playing
- 1986–1988: Canadians Amsterdam
- 1988–1996: Den Helder
- 1996–1997: EBBC Den Bosch
- 1997–1999: Amsterdam Astronauts

Coaching
- 2009–2010: Netherlands Under-16
- 2018–2020: ZZ Leiden

Career highlights
- As player: 8× Dutch League champion (1989–1995, 1997, 1999); As coach: NBB Cup champion (2019); DBL Coach of the Year (2019)

Rolf Franke (born 7 April 1967) is a Dutch retired basketball player and current coach. As a player, Franke played for multiple clubs in the Netherlands and he represented the Dutch national basketball team in 60 games as well.

He is the son of Wim Franke and father of Yannick Franke, both basketball players as well.

== Professional career ==
As a player, Franke won the Dutch Eredivisie title eight times, while winning the NBB Cup four times.

== Coaching career ==
=== ZZ Leiden ===
On 11 June 2018, Franke signed a one-year contract to become the head coach of ZZ Leiden. On 31 March 2019, Franke won the NBB Cup with Leiden, the club's first trophy since 2013. On 24 April 2019, it was announced that Franke won the DBL Coach of the Year.

On 5 July 2019, Leiden announced that Franke was returning for a second season. After the 2019–20 season was cancelled early due to the COVID-19 pandemic, Leiden decided not to extend Franke's contract.

== Honours ==
=== As player ===
- Eredivisie (8): 1989, 1990, 1991, 1992, 1993, 1994 1995, 1997, 1999

=== As coach ===
Leiden

- NBB Cup: 2018–19
- DBL Coach of the Year: 2018–19
