= Clayton Vette =

American basketball player (born 1988)

Free agent
- Position: Power forward

Personal information
- Born: September 5, 1988 (age 38) Waverly, Iowa, U.S.
- Listed height: 2.02 m (6 ft 8 in)
- Listed weight: 109 kg (240 lb)

Career information
- High school: Waverly-Shell Rock (Waverly, Iowa)
- College: Iowa State (2007–2008); Winona State (2009–2013)
- NBA draft: 2013: undrafted
- Playing career: 2013–2020
- Number: 34

Career history
- 2013–2014: Antwerp Giants
- 2014–2015: Sluneta Ústí nad Labem
- 2015–2016: SZTE-Szedeák
- 2016–2017: Landstede Zwolle
- 2017–2019: ZZ Leiden
- 2019–2020: Okapi Aalst

Career highlights
- Dutch Cup champion (2019); All-DBL Team (2017); NABC Division II Player of the Year (2013); First-team Division II All-American (2013); NSIC Player of the Year (2013); 2× First-team All-NSIC (2012, 2013); Iowa Mr. Basketball (2007)

Clayton Vette (born September 5, 1988) is an American professional basketball player, who last played for Okapi Aalst of the Pro Basketball League (PBL). Standing at 2.02 m (6 ft 7 1/2 in), Vette plays as power forward. He is currently an assistant basketball coach at Wartburg College in Waverly, Iowa since 2022.

== Professional career ==
On July 25, 2017, Vette signed with ZZ Leiden of the Dutch Basketball League. On July 6, 2018, Vette re-signed with Leiden. On March 31, 2019, Vette and Leiden won the NBB Cup.

In the 2019 offseason, Vette signed with Okapi Aalstar of the Belgian Pro Basketball League (PBL).
