= Kenneth Simms =

American basketball player (born 1986)

Danang Dragons
- Position: Center
- League: VBA

Personal information
- Born: August 4, 1986 (age 39) Bronx, New York, U.S.
- Listed height: 2.06 m (6 ft 9 in)
- Listed weight: 245 lb (111 kg)

Career information
- High school: Jackson Memorial (Jackson, New Jersey)
- College: FIU (2004–2006); Kansas City (2007–2008); Cumberland (2008–2009)
- NBA draft: 2009: undrafted
- Playing career: 2009–present

Career history
- 2009: Sūduva-Mantinga
- 2009–2010: Maryland Marvels
- 2010–2011: Craiova
- 2011: Ningxia Hanas
- 2011–2013: Södertälje Kings
- 2013: Welcome
- 2013–2014: Liège
- 2014–2015: KTP
- 2015: Soles de Santo Domingo Este
- 2015–2016: Mantovana
- 2016: Indios de San Francisco de Macorís
- 2016: Gunma Crane Thunders
- 2016–2017: Kaposvári
- 2017–2018: KTP
- 2018: Kataja
- 2018: UJAP Quimper 29
- 2018–2019: ZZ Leiden
- 2019–2020: PS Karlsruhe Lions
- 2021–2022: Fryshuset Basket
- 2022–present: Danang Dragons

Career highlights
- Dutch Cup champion (2019); Basketligan champion (2013)

Kenneth Simms (born August 4, 1986) is an American basketball player who played for Danang Dragons of the Vietnam Basketball Association (VBA). Standing at 6 ft 8 in (2.03 m), Simms plays as center.

Born in Bronx, New York, Simms has played for several clubs in Europe, South America and Asia since the start of his professional career in 2009.

== Professional career ==
In 2010, Simms signed with CSM SCU Craiova in Romania, where he played until April. In the summer of 2010, he played for Ningxia Hanas in China.

Simms spent the following two seasons with Södertälje Kings of the Swedish Basketligan and the EuroChallenge. After a summer with Welcome in Uruguay, Simms signed with Belgian club Liège Basket for the 2013–14 season.

On July 12, 2014, Simms signed with SOMB, prior to being released before the start of the season. Affare getting cut, Simms signed with KTP-Basket of the Finnish Korisliiga. On October 9, 2015, he signed with Soles de Santo Domingo in the Dominican Republic.

For the 2015–16 season, Simms signed with Pallacanestro Mantovana of the Serie A2 Basket, the Italian second-tier league. On April 7, 2016, he was named the MVP of Round 27 of the Serie A2, after recording 17 points and 17 rebounds.

After playing with Indios de San Francisco in the summer of 2016, Simms signed with Hungarian team Kaposvári KK.

On August 8, 2017, Simms returned to KTP-Basket. In February, Simms was sent to Kataja Basket in a trade for Tim Williams.

On April 23, 2018, Simms signed with Quimper, of the French second tier LNB Pro B.

On July 2, 2018, Simms signed with ZZ Leiden of the Dutch Basketball League (DBL). On March 31, he won the NBB Cup with Leiden.
