= Alec Wintering =

American basketball player (born 1995)

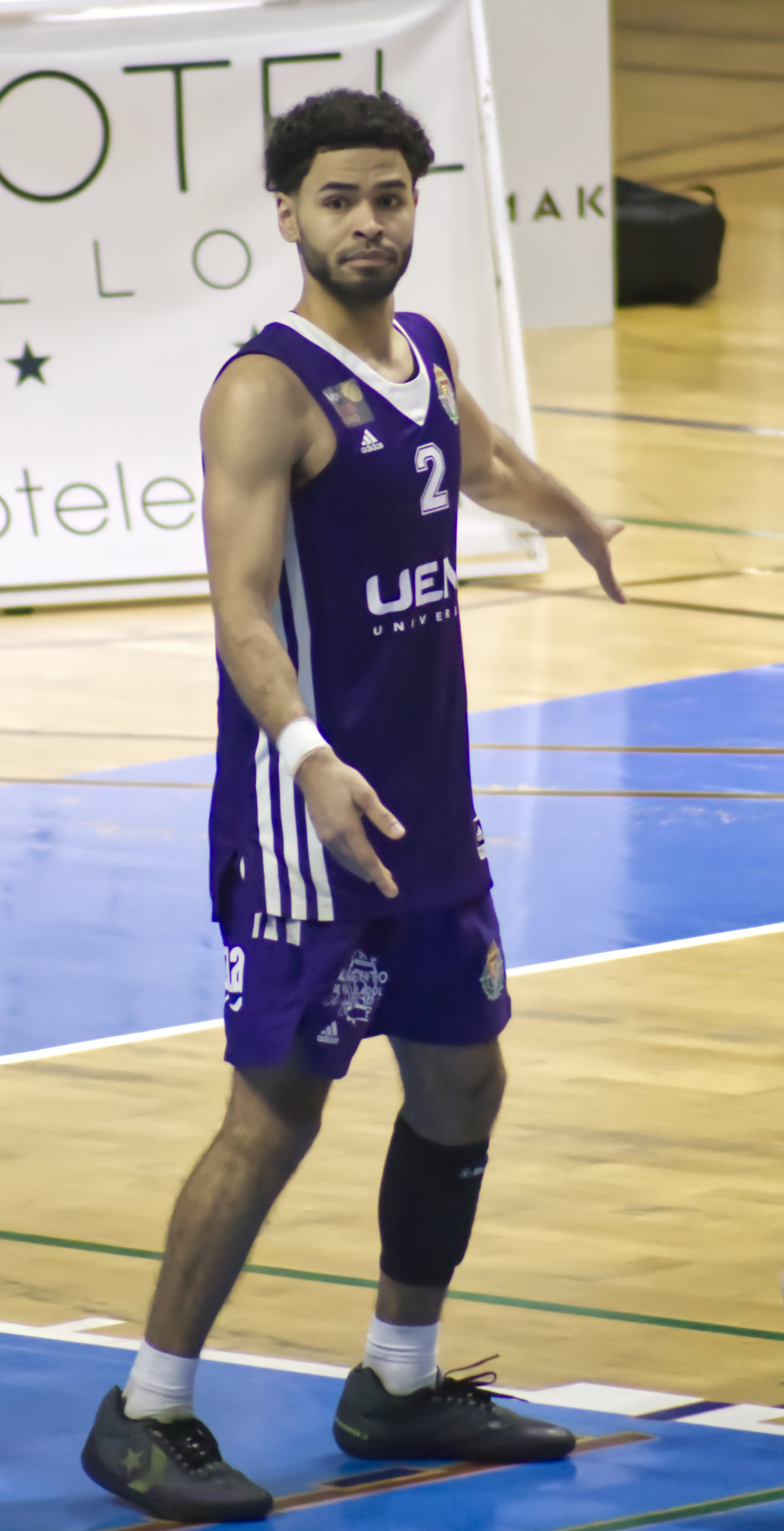
- Wintering with Real Valladolid in 2022

No. 2 – Palencia Baloncesto
- Position: Point guard
- League: Primera FEB

Personal information
- Born: April 26, 1995 (age 31) Concord, North Carolina
- Listed height: 6 ft 0 in (1.83 m)
- Listed weight: 165 lb (75 kg)

Career information
- High school: United Faith Christian Academy (Charlotte, North Carolina)
- College: Portland (2013–2017)
- NBA draft: 2017: undrafted
- Playing career: 2017–present

Career history
- 2017–2018: Araberri
- 2018–2019: Dutch Windmills
- 2019–2020: Peñas Huesca
- 2020–2021: Melilla
- 2021–2022: Real Valladolid
- 2022–2023: Palencia
- 2023–2024: Estudiantes
- 2024–present: Palencia

Career highlights
- First team all-WCC (2016); Second team all-WCC (2015)

Alec Wintering (born April 26, 1995) is an American basketball player for Palencia Baloncesto of the Primera FEB. Standing at 180 cm (5 ft 11 in), he plays as point guard.

== College career ==
Wintering played four seasons of college basketball with the Portland Pilots. He averaged 14.1 points and 5.2 assists in 110 games with the Pilots.

As a freshman in the 2013–14 season, Wintering was the Pilots' starting point guard for the first 27 games of the season before suffering a leg injury.

Wintering returned to the starting lineup for the Pilots as a sophomore in 2014–15 and set the Pilots' single-season record for assists with 187. His 45.8% three point shooting ranked fifth best in a season in Pilots' history. For his performances over the season, Wintering was named second team all-West Coast Conference (WCC).

As a junior in 2015–16 Wintering again improved his production. He scored 18.3 points per game and led the team in points, assists and steals. His 584 points scored ranked second all-time at Portland in a single season. Wintering was named first team all-WCC at season's end.

Ahead of his senior season, Wintering was named preseason first team all-WCC. He lived up to the billing, scoring 19.5 points and dishing out 5.6 assists per game before a mid-January knee injury sidelined him for the rest of the season. Wintering's final career game for Portland came on January 19, 2017 at San Francisco, when he tore his ACL. Despite missing nearly two months to end the season, Wintering was named honorable mention all-WCC as a senior.

== Professional career ==
=== Araberri (2017–2018) ===
In September 2017, Wintering signed a one-year contract with Araberri BC of the Spanish LEB Oro.

=== Dutch Windmills (2018–2019) ===
On August 1, 2018, Wintering was announced by Dutch Windmills of the Dutch Basketball League (DBL). In October 21, he suffered an injury which included a broken fibula. In January, he returned to the starting line up. On 10 April 2019, Windmills withdrew from the DBL due to its financial problems.

=== CB Peñas Huesca (2019–2020) ===
On December 21, 2019, he has signed with Huesca of the LEB Oro.

=== Melilla (2020–2021) ===
In July 2020, Wintering signed with Melilla of the LEB Oro.

=== Real Valladolid (2021–2022) ===
On July 19, 2021, he has signed with Real Valladolid Baloncesto of the LEB Oro.

=== Palencia Baloncesto (2022–present) ===
In July 2022, Wintering signed with Palencia Baloncesto of the LEB Oro.
