= BNXT League Dutch Play-offs =

BNXT League Dutch Playoffs
- Most recent season or competition: 2022 BNXT League Dutch Playoffs
- Sport: Basketball
- Founded: 1978
- No. of teams: 6
- Most recent champion: Heroes Den Bosch (2022)

The BNXT League Dutch Play-offs is the concluding elimination tournament part of the BNXT League, which determines the Dutch national basketball champions. The playoffs were introduced in the 1977–78 season, modelled after the American National Basketball Association (NBA) which already used the system. The playoffs were part of the Eredivisie (later the Dutch Basketball League) until 2021, when they became part of the BNXT League, which is a fusion league with Belgium.

The play-offs generally commence in May and finish in June or July.

== Formats ==
Several different formats have been used of the existence of the playoffs.

=== 1977–1982 ===
Semifinals
1
4
2
3

Finals

=== 1982–1992 ===
In 1982, the finals were expanded to a best-of-five series.

Semifinals
1
4
2
3

Finals

=== 1993–2015, 2018–2019 ===
From 1993 to 2015, eight teams qualified for the playoffs each year. The quarterfinals were a best-of-three, the semifinals a best-of-five, and the finals a best-of-seven.

Quarterfinals
1
8
4
5
3
6
2
7

Semifinals

Finals

=== 2015–2018 ===
Because the number of teams in 2014 was reduced to nine, the number of teams qualifying for the playoffs was reduced as well. The semi-finals became a best-of-seven series as well.

Quarterfinals
4
5
3
6

Semifinals
1
2

Finals

=== 2020–2021 ===
In 2020, the quarter-finals were played in a two-legged series with the team with the most aggregated points winning. The finals were shortened to a best-of-five.

Quarterfinals
1
8
4
5
3
6
2
7

Semifinals

Finals

=== 2021–present ===
Since 2021, under the umbrella of the BNXT League. Teams are ranked based on their standings in the Elite Gold and the Elite Silver.

Quarterfinals
4
5
3
6

Semifinals
1
2

Finals

== List of playoff series ==
This is a listing of Dutch national basketball playoffs series, grouped by club. Bolded years indicate wins, underlined years are finals. Years in italics indicate series in progress. Tables are sorted first by the number of series, then the number of wins, and then by year of first occurrence.

=== Donar ===
Opponent	S	Occurrences	GP	W	L	%
Heroes Den Bosch	9	**2004**, 2005, 2009, **2011**, 2012, **2014**, 2015, **2017**, 2021, 2022	51	26	25	
ZZ Leiden	9	1978, **2010**, 2011, 2013, **2014**, **2015**, **2016**, **2018**, **2019**	41	25	16	
Amsterdam Basketball	5	2001, 2003, **2004**, **2005**, 2007	17	7	10	
Landstede Hammers	3	**2016**, **2017**, 2019	16	10	6	
Magixx	2	**2005**, 2008	6	3	3	
Feyenoord Basketball	2	**2009**, **2016**	5	4	1	
BSW	2	**2010**, **2011**	6	4	2	
Den Helder Suns	2	**2019**, **2021**	4	4	0	
Aris Leeuwarden	2	**2015**, **2022**	5	4	1	
Omniworld	1	**2004**	2	2	0	
Virtus Werkendam	1	**2001**	3	2	1	
NAC	1	2002	2	0	2	
West-Brabant Giants	1	**2010**	5	4	1	
Den Helder Kings	1	**2013**	3	3	0	
Apollo Amsterdam	1	**2014**	2	2	0	
Totals	42		168	100	68	.595

=== ZZ Leiden ===
Opponent	S	Occurrences	GP	W	L	%
Landstede Hammers	6	**2012**, **2014**, 2017, **2018**, **2021**, **2022**	24	17	7	
Heroes Den Bosch	4	2007, 2012, **2021**, 2022	15	6	9	
Donar	3	**1978**, **2011**, **2013**	13	9	4	
Matrixx Magixx	3	**2010**, **2011**, **2013**	9	8	1	
Amsterdam	2	2009, **2011**	4	2	2	
Aris Leeuwarden	2	**2013**, **2018**	7	6	1	
Apollo Amsterdam	1	**2017**	2	2	0	
Feyenoord Basketball	1	**2019**	2	2	0	
BAL	1	**2021**	2	2	0	
Totals	23		78	54	24	.591

=== Heroes Den Bosch ===
Opponent	S	Occurrences	GP	W	L	%
Heroes Den Bosch	9	2004, **2005, 2009**, 2011, **2012**, 2014, **2015**, 2017, **2021**, **2022**	51	25	26	
Landstede Hammers	5	**2004**, **2008**, **2015**, 2016, 2019	21	11	10	
BSW Weert	5	2001, **2003**, **2005**, **2007**, **2013**	19	12	7	
ZZ Leiden	4	**2007**, **2012**, 2021, **2022**	15	9	6	
Amsterdam Basketball	3	2002, 2008, 2009	17	7	10	
Aris Leeuwarden	3	2010, 2013, **2014**	8	3	5	
EiffelTowers Nijmegen	2	2003, **2004**	7	4	3	
Apollo Amsterdam	2	**2016**, **2019**	4	4	0	
Feyenoord Basketball	2	**2017**, 2018	5	3	2	
Punch	1	1978	3	1	2	
BV Den Helder	1	**2001**	2	2	0	
Magixx	1	**2007**	4	4	0	
West-Brabant Giants	1	**2008**	4	3	1	
Den Helder Kings	1	**2014**	3	3	0	
United	1	**2021**	2	1	1	
Totals	41		165	92	73	.558

== Recent finals ==
Numbers in brackets after team names refer to the seed as which they came into the playoffs.

Year	Home court advantage	Coach	Result	Home court disadvantage	Coach	Ref.
2010	GasTerra Flames (1)	Marco van den Berg	4–1	WCAA Giants (2)	Erik Braal	
2011	ZZ Leiden (1)	Toon van Helfteren	4–3	GasTerra Flames (2)	Marco van den Berg	
2012	ZZ Leiden (1)	Toon van Helfteren	1–4	SPM Shoeters Den Bosch (3)	Raoul Korner	
2013	ZZ Leiden (2)	Toon van Helfteren	4–0	Aris Leeuwarden (4)	Erik Braal	
2014	GasTerra Flames (1)	Ivica Skelin	4–3	SPM Shoeters Den Bosch (2)	Sam Jones	
2015	SPM Shoeters Den Bosch (1)	Sam Jones	4–1	Donar (3)	Ivica Skelin	
2016	Landstede Zwolle (1)	Herman van den Belt	1–4	Donar (3)	Erik Braal	
2017	Donar (1)	Erik Braal	4–1	Landstede Zwolle (2)	Herman van den Belt	
2018	Donar (1)	Erik Braal	4–0	ZZ Leiden (3)	Paul Vervaeck	
2019	Landstede Zwolle (2)	Herman van den Belt	4–2	Donar (4)	Erik Braal	
2020	Cancelled due to the coronavirus pandemic					

=== Performance by team ===
Club	Winners	Runners-up	Years won	Years runner-up
Donar	4	3	2010, 2014, 2017, 2018	2011, 2015, 2019
Leiden	2	2	2011, 2013	2012, 2018
Landstede Hammers	1	2	2019	2016, 2017
Heroes Den Bosch	1	1	2015	2012
Aris Leeuwarden	–	1		2013
West-Brabant Giants	–	1		2010
