= Marcel Aarts =

Dutch basketball player

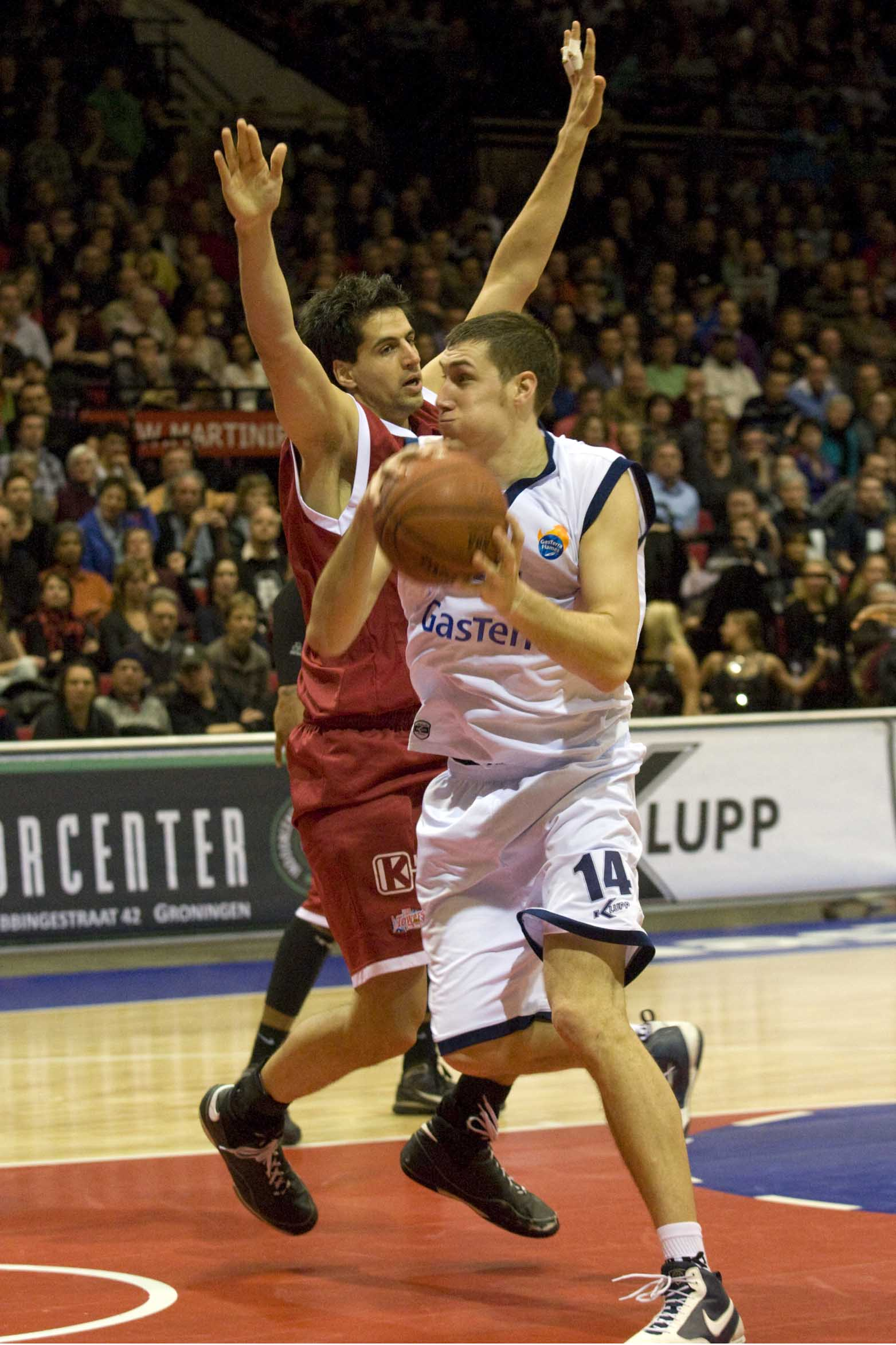
- Aarts (left, in red) in 2010

Personal information
- Born: 9 August 1983 (age 43) Ammerzoden, Netherlands
- Listed height: 2.13 m (7 ft 0 in)
- Listed weight: 104 kg (229 lb)

Career information
- NBA draft: 2005: undrafted
- Playing career: 2002–2018
- Position: Center
- Number: 14

Career history
- 2002–2011: Den Bosch
- 2011–2013: Matrixx Magixx
- 2013–2016, 2017, 2018: Den Bosch

Career highlights
- 3× Dutch League champion (2006, 2007, 2015); 3× Dutch Cup champion (2008–2009, 2016); Dutch Supercup champion (2013); DBL MVP Under 23 (2005); 2× DBL blocks leader (2004, 2011); DBL All-Star (2011)

Marcel Aarts (born 9 August 1983) is a Dutch retired basketball player. Aarts is 2.13 m (7 ft 0 in) tall and usually played at the center position.

== Career ==
Aarts started his career with the EiffelTowers Den Bosch, and played here for 9 seasons. After playing two seasons for Matrixx Magixx from Wijchen, Aarts returned to Den Bosch in the summer of 2013.

On 5 January 2017, Aarts signed a new contract with New Heroes Den Bosch. On 12 January 2018, Aarst returned from his retirement to sign a short-period contract for Den Bosch, which was dealing with several injuries.
