= List of Dutch Basketball League season blocks leaders =

The Dutch Basketball League's (DBL) blocks title is awarded to the player with the highest blocks per game average in a given regular season.

== Leaders ==
Key
Player (X)	Name of the player and number of times they had won the award at that point (if more than one)
Club (X)	Name of the club and the number of times a player of it has won the award (if more than one)

Season	Player	Nationality	Team	Total	BPG
1985–86	Daryl Gadsen	United States	Hatrans Haaksbergen	87	2.90
1986–87	Mike Reddick	United States	EBBC Den Bosch	99	2.75
1987–88	Mike Reddick (2)	United States	EBBC Den Bosch	91	2.53
1988–89	Cedric Miller	United States	Rotterdam	111	3.08
1989–90	Nathan Dijkstra	Netherlands	DAS Delft	69	1.97
1990–91	Claude Williams	United States	BS Weert	45	1.55
1991–92	Sanders Jackson	United States	Orca's	49	1.88
1994–95	Tyrone Travis	United States	Donar	57	2.71
1996–97	Michael Thomas	United States	Donar	52	2.36
1998–99	David Culley	United States	BS Weert	105	3.62
1990–2000	Hanno Schoenmakers	Netherlands	Omniworld Almere	91	3.25
2000–01	Eric Nelson	United States	Omniworld Almere	46	1.43
2001–02	Eric Nelson (2)	United States	EiffelTowers Nijmegen	61	2.25
2002–03	Travis Reed	United States	EBBC Den Bosch	32	1.39
2003–04	Marcel Aarts	Netherlands	EBBC Den Bosch	37	1.02
2004–05	Jonathan Collins	United States	Landstede	61	2.03
2005–06	Ransford Brempong	Canada	Matrixx Magixx	72	2.76
2006–07	Ransford Brempong (2)	Canada	Matrixx Magixx	90	2.46
2007–08	Darnell Wilson	United States	Landstede Zwolle	46	1.3
2008–09	Ransford Brempong (3)	Canada	Donar	53	1.4
2009–10	James Hughes	United States	Nijmegen (3)	54	1.7
2010–11	Marcel Aarts (2)	Netherlands	EiffelTowers Den Bosch	50	1.4
2011–12	Avis Wyatt	United States	GasTerra Flames (2)	40	1.4
2012–13	Berend Weijs	Netherlands	Apollo Amsterdam	99	2.8
2013–14	Berend Weijs (2)	Netherlands	Apollo Amsterdam	71	2.0
2014–15	Will Felder	United States	ZZ Leiden	31	1.2
2015–16	Chase Fieler	United States	Donar	48	1.8
2016–17	Andrew Smith	United States	Donar	39	1.4
2017–18	Berend Weijs (3)	Netherlands	Apollo Amsterdam	38	1.3
2018–19	Berend Weijs (4)	Netherlands	Apollo Amsterdam	64	2.0
2019–20 (Note: The 2019–20 season was cancelled prematurely due to the COVID-19 pandemic.)	Austin Lawton	United States	Feyenoord	32	1.5
2020–21	Bart Bijnsdorp	Netherlands	The Hague Royals	25	1.4
2021–22 (Note: Since the 2021–22 season, the DBL was re-placed by the BNXT League. The season scoring leaders are the players from Dutch clubs with the highest point average in the domestic phase (excluding playoffs).)	Roger Moute a Bidias	Cameroon	Apollo Amsterdam		2.2
2022–23	Spencer Levi	United States	Yoast United		1.7
