= DBL Statistical Player of the Year =

The Dutch Basketball League Statistical Player of the Year is an award given to the player who has the best statistical season in the Dutch highest professional basketball league. The player with the highest Player efficiency rating receives the award from the FEB. The award is given after the regular season and was first handed out in 2003 to Travis Reed.

== Winners ==
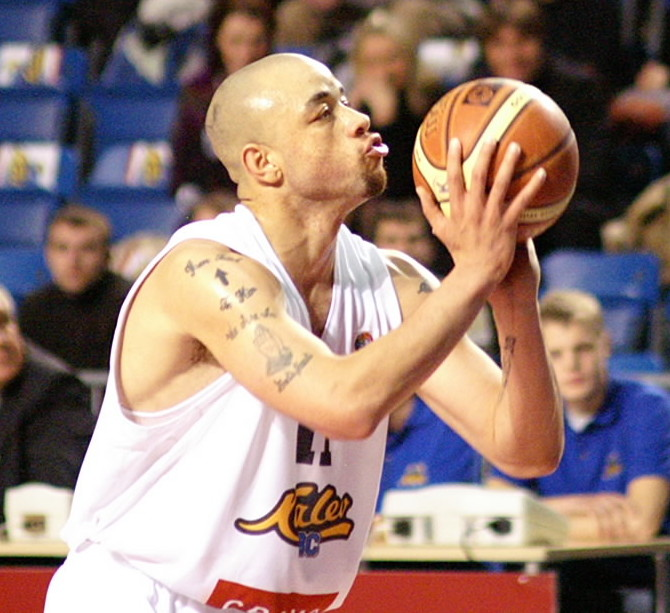
Travis Reed won the inaugural award in 2003.

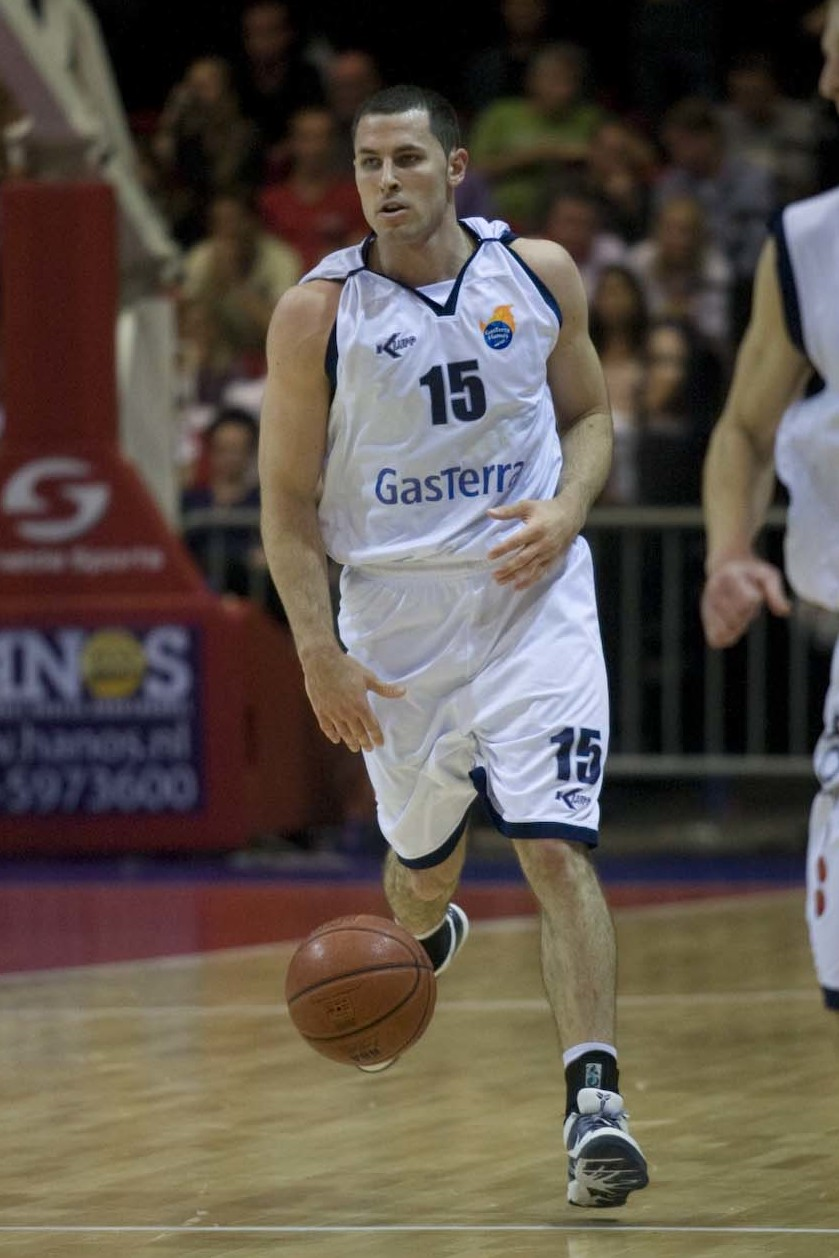
Matt Bauscher won the award in 2008, while playing for Aris.

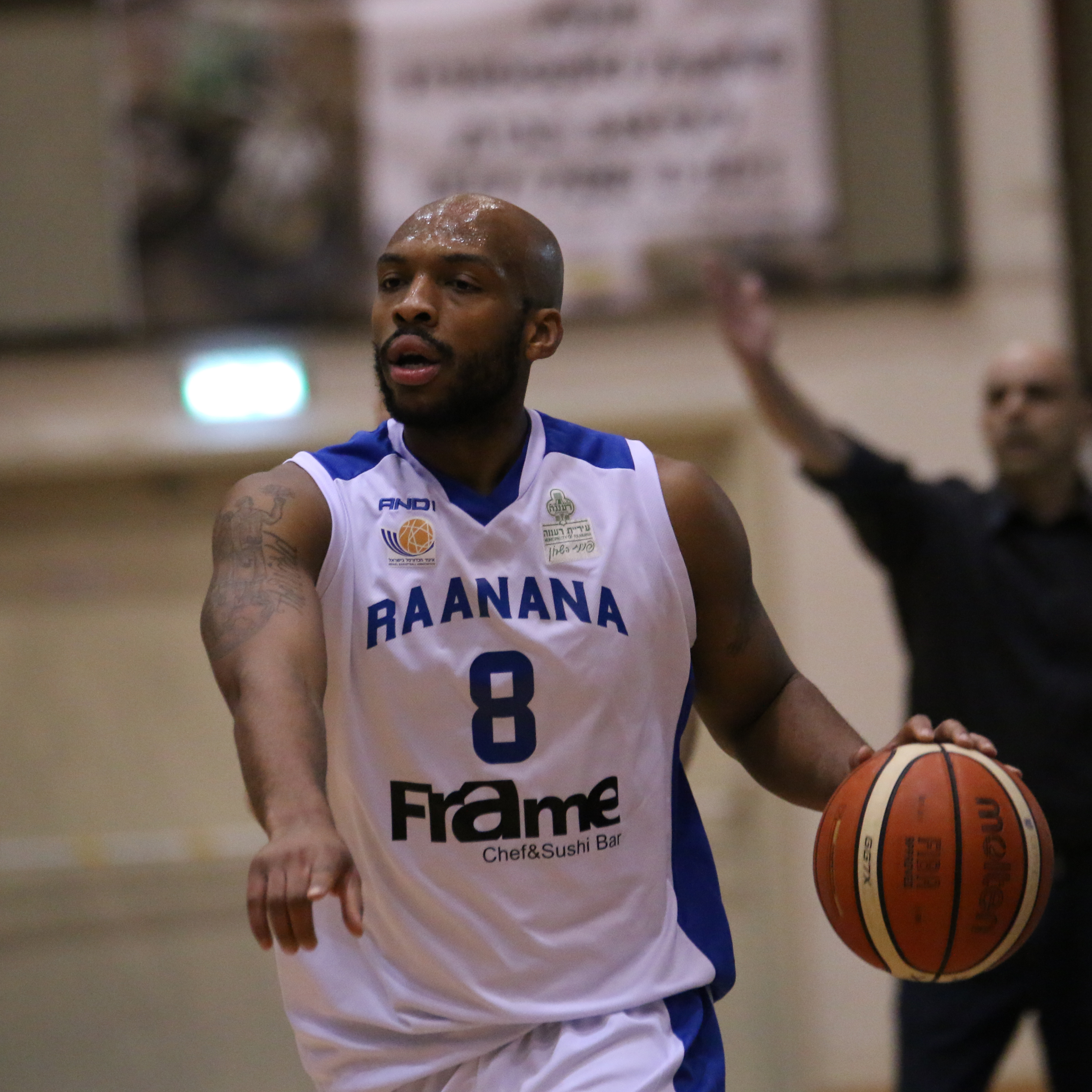
Samme Givens won the award for the 2012–13 season.

Key
Player (X)	Name of the player and number of times they had won the award at that point (if more than one)
Nationality	Nationality as registered by FIBA, player may hold more nationalities
†	Indicates multiple award winners in the same season
‡	Denotes the club were DBL champions in the same season

Season	Player	Pos.	Nationality	Team	PIR	Ref.
2002–03	Travis Reed	Forward/center	United States	EBBC Den Bosch	24.2	
2003–04	Ian Hanavan	Forward/center	United States (Note: Ian Hanavan also owns the Belgian nationality.)	Omniworld Almere	23.6	
2004–05	Maurice Ingram	Center	United States	BSW Weert	24.2	
2005–06	Chris Woods	Forward	United States	Upstairs Weert	24.3	
2006–07	Leon Rodgers	Forward	United States	EiffelTowers Den Bosch^{‡}	24.6	
2007–08	Ashley Champion	Forward	United States	Upstairs Weert	23.4	
2008–09	Matt Bauscher	Guard	United States	De Friesland Aris	22.6	
2009–10	Elijah Palmer	Forward	United States	Upstairs Weert	21.1	
2010–11	Skip Mills	Guard	United States	EiffelTowers Den Bosch^{‡}	18.4	
2011–12	Tai Wesley	Center	Guam (Note: Tai Wesley, as a Guam citizen, also owns the American nationality.)	EiffelTowers Den Bosch	19.5	
2012–13	Samme Givens	Forward	United States	Aris Leeuwarden	21.8	
2013–14	Darius Theus	Guard	United States	Aris Leeuwarden	19.5	
2014–15	Joe Burton	Center	United States	Landstede	23.5	
2015–16	Ross Bekkering	Center	Canada (Note: Ross Bekkering also owns the Dutch nationality.)	Donar^{‡}	21.3	
2016–17	Chase Fieler	Forward	United States	Donar^{‡}	21.5	
2017–18	Brandyn Curry	Guard	United States	Donar^{‡}	22.3	
2018–19	Darius Thompson	Guard	United States	ZZ Leiden	23.5	

== Awards won by nationality ==
Country	Total
United States	14
Canada	1
Guam	1

== Awards won by club ==
Country	Total
Den Bosch	4
BSW Weert	4
Aris Leeuwarden	3
Donar	3
