= Camille Richardson =

Dutch basketball player

Personal information
- Born: 15 January 1976 (age 50) 's-Hertogenbosch, Netherlands
- Listed height: 1.99 m (6 ft 6 in)

Career information
- Playing career: 1999–2007
- Position: Small forward

Career history
- 1999–2000: EBBC Den Bosch
- 2000–2005: BSW
- 2005–2006: West-Brabant Giants
- 2006–2007: Omniworld Almere

Camille Richardson (born 15 January 1976) is a Dutch former basketball player. He played for Dutch Basketball League clubs Stepco BSW, Bergen op Zoom, Omniworld Almere and Den Bosch Basketball during the 1999-2007 seasons. Richardson had 5 caps for the Netherlands national basketball team during the 2004-2005 season.

== Business ==
In 2013 Richardson founded a company together with Serge Brabander called OneFit B.V. It is an internet platform that provides a monthly all in one subscription with access to gyms, yoga studios, swimming pools and a variety of other training facilities. It currently operates in several cities in The Netherlands, Germany and Spain.
