= DBL All-Rookie Team =

The DBL All-Rookie Team is a team constituted by the best rookies in a season of the Dutch Basketball League, the highest professional basketball league in the Netherlands. This team is based on players' performance throughout the regular season. After the end of the season, the best players are chosen.

== Teams ==
Key
Player (X)	Denotes the number of times the player has been selected
**Player (in bold text)**	Indicates the player who won the Rookie of the Year award in the same year.

Year	Position	Player	Nationality	Team
2006–07	G	Aron Royé	Netherlands	ZZ Leiden
2006–07	G	Jeffrey de Vries	Netherlands	Omniworld Almere
2006–07	G	Yasalde Pas Costa	Netherlands	Rotterdam
2006–07	F	**Calvin Smith**	Netherlands	West-Brabant Giants
2006–07	F	Maarten Esveldt	Belgium	BSW Weert
2007–2013	Not awarded			
2013–14	G	Yannick Franke	Netherlands	Rotterdam
2013–14	G	Tom Snikkers	United States	Aris Leeuwarden
2013–14	F	Roman Grigoryev	Russia	BSW Weert
2013–14	F	**Joshua Duinker**	Australia	ZZ Leiden
2013–14	C	Lucas Steijn	Netherlands	Apollo
2014–15	G	Nigel Van Oostrum	United Kingdom	Aris Leeuwarden
2014–15	G	Mick Fleuren	Netherlands	BSW Weert
2014–15	F	**Daan Rosenmuller**	Netherlands	BSW Weert
2014–15	F	Nigel Onuoha	Netherlands	Rotterdam
2014–15	C	Jan Driessen	Netherlands	ZZ Leiden
2015–16	G	Jaouad Darib	Netherlands	Landstede Zwolle
2015–16	F	Siem Willems	Netherlands	ZZ Leiden
2015–16	F	Tom Aarts	Netherlands	Aris Leeuwarden
2015–16	F	**Freek Vos**	Netherlands	Landstede Zwolle
2015–16	F	Rens van Ravensteijn	Netherlands	BSW Weert
2016–17	G	Rens Butter	Netherlands	ZZ Leiden
2016–17	G	Sam van Dijk	Netherlands	Rotterdam
2016–17	G	Marijn Ververs	Netherlands	ZZ Leiden
2016–17	F	Jules Schild	Netherlands	BSW Weert
2016–17	F	**Olaf Schaftenaar**	Netherlands	Landstede Zwolle
2017–18	G	**Boyd van der Vuurst de Vries**	Netherlands	Den Helder Suns
2017–18	G	Nino Gorissen	Netherlands	BAL Weert
2017–18	F	Jacco Fritz	Netherlands	BAL Weert
2017–18	F	Tom Koopman	Netherlands	Den Helder Suns
2017–18	C	Rienk Mast	Netherlands	Donar
2018–19	G	**Boy van Vliet**	Netherlands	Den Helder Suns
2018–19	G	Shane Hammink	Netherlands	Donar
2018–19	F	Ivan Simic	Netherlands	BAL Weert
2018–19	F	Nick Hammink	Netherlands	Dutch Windmills
2018–19	C	Jito Kok	Netherlands	Dutch Windmills
2019–20	Not named after cancellation of the season due to the COVID-19 pandemic			
2020–21	G	Bob Berghuis	Netherlands	Yoast United
2020–21	G	Yamill Wip	Suriname	Feyenoord
2020–21	F	Luuk van Bree	Netherlands	ZZ Leiden
2020–21	C	Bart Bijnsdorp	Netherlands	The Hague Royals
2020–21	C	**Emmanuel Nzekwesi**	Netherlands	ZZ Leiden

== Players named by team ==
Team	Total
ZZ Leiden	8
BSW Weert	6
Feyenoord Rotterdam	5
