= Avis Wyatt =

American basketball player (born 1984)

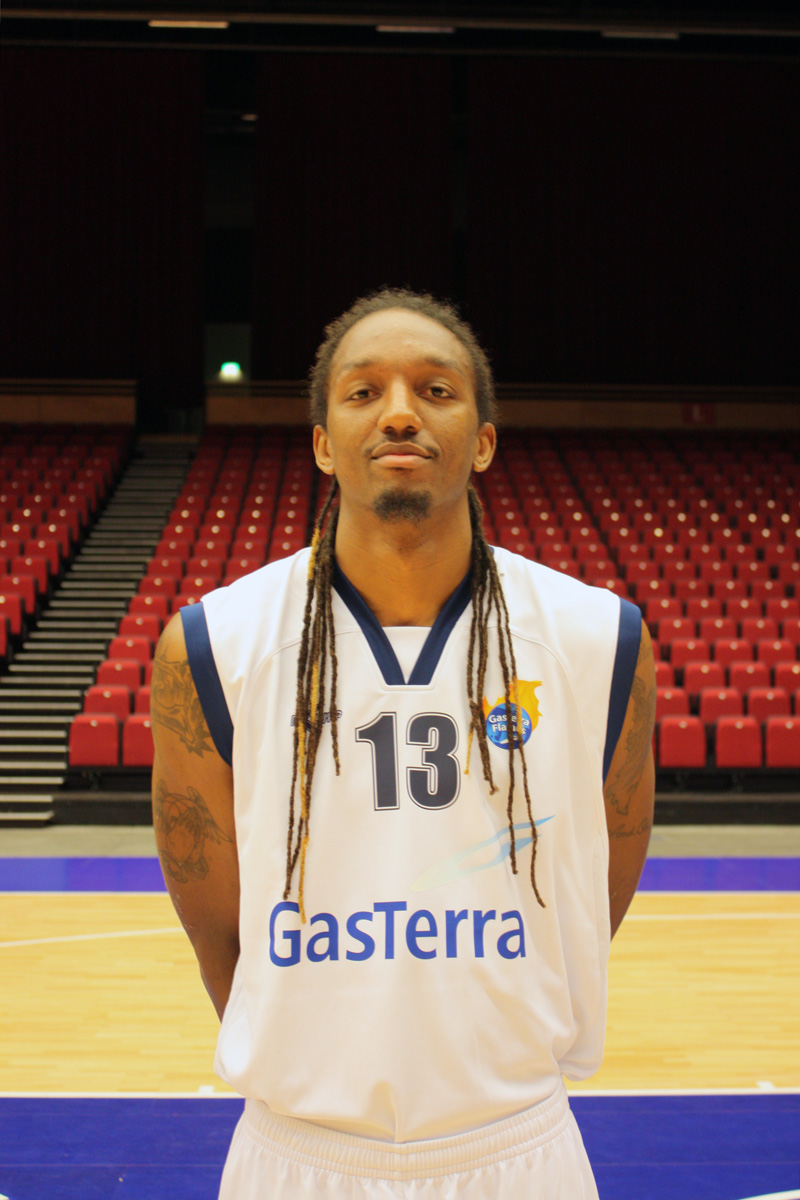
- Wyatt in his GasTerra Flames shirt in 2011

Personal information
- Born: August 20, 1984 (age 41) Petersburg, Virginia, U.S.
- Listed height: 2.10 m (6 ft 11 in)
- Listed weight: 96 kg (212 lb)

Career information
- High school: Petersburg (Petersburg, Virginia)
- College: Virginia State (2002–2006)
- NBA draft: 2006: undrafted
- Playing career: 2007–2013
- Position: Power forward / center
- Number: 11, 13, 15

Career history
- 2007–2009: Amsterdam
- 2009–2011: AEL Limassol
- 2011–2012: GasTerra Flames
- 2012–2013: Ikaros Kallitheas
- 2013: ETHA Engomis

Career highlights
- 2x DBL champion (2008, 2009); DBL blocks leader (2012); All-Cypriot League First Team (2011)

Avis Jawan Wyatt (born August 20, 1984) is an American retired basketball player. Wyatt is 6 ft 11 in (2.11 m) and played as power forward and center. After four years playing in college for Virginia State, Wyatt played in the Netherlands, Cyprus and Greece.

== Biography ==
Wyatt is a native of Petersburg, Virginia. He attended Petersburg High School as well as Virginia State University. While attending Virginia State University, he pledged Phi Beta Sigma fraternity, Fall 2004.

== Career ==
Wyatt started his professional career in 2007, in the Netherlands with MyGuide Amsterdam. Here he played for two seasons and won the DBL championship two times. The next year, Wyatt moved to Cyprus to play for AEL Limassol, reaching the finals of the Cypriot League.

On June 17, 2011, Wyatt signed with GasTerra Flames to return to the Netherlands. In his year with Flames, Wyatt averaged 8.7 points and 6 rebounds per game. The team reached the semi-finals of the 2011–12 DBL season.

== Honours ==
- MyGuide Amsterdam
  - 2x Dutch Champion (2): 2008, 2009
- AEL Limassol
  - All-League First Team (1): 2011
- GasTerra Flames
  - DBL blocks leader (1): 2012
