= Andrew Smith (basketball, born 1992) =

American-Latvian basketball player

No. 11 – Eisbären Bremerhaven
- Position: Power forward / center
- League: ProA

Personal information
- Born: December 14, 1992 (age 33) Pompano Beach, Florida, U.S.
- Listed height: 2.06 m (6 ft 9 in)
- Listed weight: 100 kg (220 lb)

Career information
- High school: Highlands Christian (Pompano Beach, Florida)
- College: Liberty (2011–2015)
- NBA draft: 2015: undrafted
- Playing career: 2015–present

Career history
- 2015–2016: Jūrmala
- 2016–2017: Donar
- 2017–2018: Rasta Vechta
- 2018–2019: Jämtland
- 2019: Södertälje Kings
- 2019–2020: Donar
- 2020–2021: Science City Jena
- 2021–2022: Luleå
- 2022–2023: Kleb Basket Ferrara
- 2023: Soles de Mexicali
- 2023–2024: Hapoel Eilat
- 2024: New Basket Brindisi
- 2024: Alba Fehérvár
- 2025: Pistoia Basket 2000
- 2025: Scaligera Basket Verona
- 2026: Victoria Libertas Pesaro
- 2026–present: Eisbären Bremerhaven

Career highlights
- ProA champion (2018); Dutch League champion (2017); Dutch Cup champion (2017); Dutch Supercup champion (2016); DBL blocks leader (2017)

Andrew Smith (born December 14, 1992) is an American-Latvian professional basketball player for Eisbären Bremerhaven of the German ProA. Smith played four years of college basketball for the Liberty Flames.

== College career ==
Smith attended Liberty University. As a senior, he averaged 9.6 points and 7.6 rebounds per game. Smith scored a career-high 21 points against Longwood on February 17, 2015. He finished his career with 737 points and 558 rebounds.

== Professional career ==
In August 2015, Smith signed with Jūrmala of the Latvian league.

On July 18, 2016, Smith signed a 1-year contract with Donar of the Dutch Basketball League.

In July 2017, Smith signed with Rasta Vechta of the German second division ProA. With Rasta, Smith won the ProA championship and gained promotion to the Basketball Bundesliga (BBL).

On July 3, 2019, Smith was announced by Södertälje Kings for the 2019–20 season.

On November 29, 2019, Smith returned to Donar. The 2019–20 season was cancelled prematurely in March because of the COVID-19 pandemic. Smith returned to the United States. In 10 games, he recorded 9.6 points, 5.8 rebounds, 1.2 assists, 1.0 steal and 1.0 block per game. On September 10, Smith signed with Science City Jena in Germany.

On July 4, 2021, Smith signed with BC Luleå in the Sweden.

On February 15, 2024, he signed with New Basket Brindisi of the Lega Basket Serie A.

On November 19, 2024, he signed with Pistoia Basket 2000 of the Lega Basket Serie A (LBA).

On November 8, 2026, he signed with Eisbären Bremerhaven of the German ProA.

== Personal ==
As Andrew's grandmother was Latvian citizen, in May 2015, Smith was granted a Latvian passport. This allowed him to be eligible to play for the Latvian national basketball team.
