= Josh Duinker =

Australian-Dutch basketball player

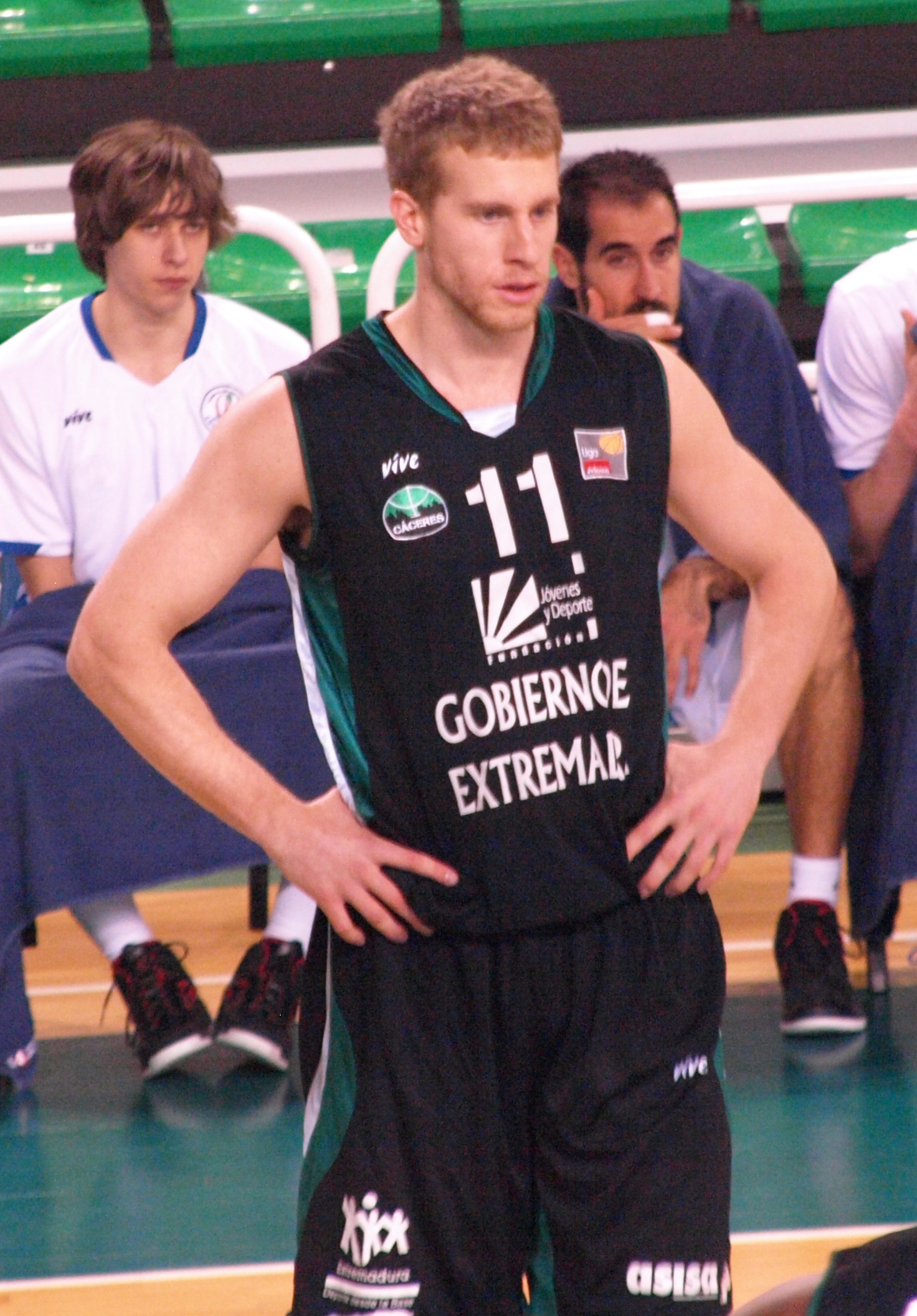
- Duinker playing for Cáceres in 2013

Personal information
- Born: 18 April 1989 (age 37) Sydney, New South Wales
- Listed height: 6 ft 11 in (2.11 m)
- Listed weight: 230 lb (104 kg)

Career information
- High school: St. Pius X (Sydney, New South Wales)
- College: Richmond (2008–2012)
- NBA draft: 2012: undrafted
- Playing career: 2012–2019
- Position: Power forward / center
- Number: 8

Career history
- 2012–2013: Cáceres CB
- 2013–2014: ZZ Leiden
- 2014–2015: Sydney Kings
- 2015: Nelson Giants
- 2015–2016: Egis Körmend
- 2016: Regatas Corrientes
- 2016–2017: Defensor Sporting
- 2017: Wellington Saints
- 2017–2019: Kumamoto Volters

Career highlights
- NZNBL champion (2017); Hungarian Cup champion (2016); NZNBL Most Outstanding Kiwi Forward/Centre (2015); NZNBL Rookie of the Year (2015); All-DBL Team (2014); DBL Rookie of the Year (2014); DBL All-Rookie Team (2014); DBL All-Star (2014)

Joshua Duinker (/ˈdʌŋkər/ DUNK-ər; born 18 April 1989) is an Australian-Dutch former professional basketball player who last played for the Kumamoto Volters of the Japanese B.League . He has been a member of the Dutch national basketball team and holds a New Zealand passport because of his mother.

== Early life ==
Duinker was born and raised in Sydney, New South Wales to a Dutch father and a Kiwi mother. He attended St Pius X College where he was a four-year starter and captain for coach Neil Gibson. In November 2007, he graduated from St Pius X. In 2007, he also played for the Hornsby Spiders of the Waratah League.

== College career ==
In January 2008, Duinker moved to the United States to attend the University of Richmond and play for the Spiders. He began practicing with the team and took classes in the spring semester but did not play in any games after redshirting the season.

In Duinker's four-year college career, he played 121 games while averaging 2.7 points and 1.5 rebounds per game. The Spiders managed to reach the Atlantic 10 Tournament final in 2010, but managed to one-up the next season, winning the 2011 Atlantic 10 Tournament and going on the NCAA Sweet 16.

== Professional career ==
Duinker went undrafted in the 2012 NBA draft. He later signed with Cáceres CB of Spain for the 2012–13 season. In 35 games, he averaged 7.3 points and 5.1 rebounds per game.

On 31 July 2013, Duinker signed with Zorg en Zekerheid Leiden of the Netherlands for the 2013–14 season.

On 17 June 2014, Duinker signed a two-year deal with the Sydney Kings of the Australian National Basketball League.

On 15 December 2014, Duinker signed with the Nelson Giants for the 2015 New Zealand NBL season. In May 2015, he declined to take up the second-year player option on his contract with the Sydney Kings, thus making him a free agent.

After being tested by PBC Lukoil Academic in early September 2015, Duinker later signed with Egis Körmend of the Hungarian League for the 2015–16 season.

In August 2016, Duinker signed with Argentine club Regatas Corrientes for the 2016–17 season. In November 2016, he left Regatas and signed with Uruguayan club Defensor Sporting for the rest of the season. He left Defensor in February 2017.

On 8 March 2017, Duinker signed with the Wellington Saints for the 2017 New Zealand NBL season, returning to the country for a second stint. On 11 April 2017, he was deemed a "restricted" (import) player for the rest of the 2017 season and beyond after Basketball New Zealand discovered Duinker made an appearance for the Netherlands national team in 2013—he was originally classed as a naturalised local player due to having a New Zealand passport.

For the 2017–18 season, Duinker joined Japanese team Kumamoto Volters.

== Career statistics ==
Legend
| GP | Games played | MPG | Minutes per game | FG% | Field goal percentage |
| 3P% | 3-point field goal percentage | FT% | Free throw percentage | RPG | Rebounds per game |
| APG | Assists per game | SPG | Steals per game | BPG | Blocks per game |
| PPG | Points per game | **Bold** | Career high | | Led the league |

| Year | Team | League | GP | MPG | FG% | 3P% | FT% | RPG | APG | SPG | BPG | PPG |
|---|---|---|---|---|---|---|---|---|---|---|---|---|
| 2012–13 | Cáceres | LEB Gold | 35 | 21.0 | .528 | .316 | .441 | 5.1 | .8 | .5 | .4 | 7.3 |
| 2013–14 | ZZ Leiden | DBL | 43 | 27.9 | .578 | .276 | .691 | 7.5 | .9 | .9 | .2 | 14.8 |
| 2014–15 | Sydney Kings | NBL | 28 | 18.6 | .515 | .000 | .476 | 3.9 | .2 | .5 | .3 | 5.6 |
