= BBK BMS =

Danish basketball club

Basketballklubben BMS, referred to as BMS, is a professional basketball club based in Ballerup–Måløv–Skovlunde, Denmark. BMS plays its home games at Rosenlundskolen in Skovlunde, in Ballerup Super Arena or in Højager Hall in Ballerup. BMS has on several occasions worked with neighboring club Herlev Basketball Club. It won a joint 1st in the men's division in the 2008–09 season, where the objective was to move up in the top row of the Women's League.

== History ==
BMS was founded in 1972. The club won its first senior title by defeating the Falcons with 87–85 in the Cup final. In the 1981–82 season the club employed Otis Loyd as a playing coach for the men and trainer for the women. In the fall, the men participated in the European Cup. Their opponents in the first round were the Norwegian champions Sandvika (Oslo). The first match was played on home ground in Skovlunde Hall where BMS prevailed at 107–63. In the return match in Oslo, the club won again, this time with the score 107 to 95.

With their first-round win, BMS became the first Danish men's team to proceed to the 2nd round of the FIBA European Cup Winners' Cup, where the opponent was Real Madrid, who had just had won the world championship for club teams.

KB-Hallen was filled with about 2,600 spectators when Real Madrid visited Copenhagen in November. BMS was beaten 135–84 and the following week 132–65 in Madrid.

== Recognition ==
=== Men ===
Danish League

- Winners (6): 1981–82, 1985–86, 1986–87, 1987–88, 1988–89, 1989–90

Danish Cup

- Winners (6): 1980–81, 1981–82, 1982–83, 1984–85, 1987–88, 1990–91

=== Women's team ===
Danish League

- Winners (1): 2001–02

Danish Cup

- Winners (3): 1982, 1984, 20001
