= Eric Hinrichsen =

Canadian basketball player (born 1976)

Personal information
- Born: April 13, 1976 (age 50) Campbell River, British Columbia
- Listed height: 2.03 m (6 ft 8 in)
- Listed weight: 95 kg (209 lb)

Career information
- College: Victoria (1996–1999)
- Playing career: 1999–2004

Career history
- 1999–2002: Bree
- 2002–2003: Le Havre
- 2003–2004: Donar

Career highlights
- Eredivisie champion (2004)

Eric Hinrichsen (born April 13, 1976) is a Canadian former basketball player. He played for the Canadian national team at the 2000 Summer Olympics. Standing at 2.03 m (6 ft 8 in), he played as a center. Hinrichsen played for Donar in 2003–04, helping the team win the Eredivisie championship.

== High school and college career ==
Born in Campbell River, British Columbia, Hinrichsen graduated from Carihi Secondary School in 1994. He led his high school team, the Carihi Tyees, to an 'AA' Provincial Championship in 1993. In his senior year, he was named the Most Valuable Player at the 1994 'AAA' Provincial Championships, despite his team's third-place finish at the tournament.

Hinrichsen won numerous Canadian university accolades playing for the Victoria Vikes from 1995 to 1999. He was named the CIAU (now known as Canadian Interuniversity Sport) Rookie of the Year for the 1994-95 season. In 1997, he won the Mike Moser Award, given to the CIAU player of the year. He was then named the 1997 national championship tournament Most Valuable Player, leading Victoria to a national title. Hinrichsen won the CIAU player of the year award once more in 1999, his last season with Victoria.

== Professional career ==
Hinrichsen started his career with Bree of the Belgian First Division, where he played for three seasons. In the 2001–02 season, he averaged 3.7 points and 5.4 rebounds for the team.

In the 2002–03 season, he played in France with STB Le Havre of the first-level LNB Pro A. He averaged 4.1 points and 3.7 rebounds in 30 games.

In the 2003–04 season, Hinrichsen signed with Donar (named MPC Capitals for sponsorship reasons) of the Dutch Eredivisie. He won the 2003–04 national championship with Donar after beating Tulip Den Bosch in the finals. Hinrichsen averaged 4.5 points, on 63.8% shooting from the field, and 6.4 rebounds per game with Donar.
