= Roman Grigoryev =

Russian-Dutch basketball player

Personal information
- Born: November 16, 1990 (age 35)
- Listed height: 2.00 m (6 ft 7 in)
- Listed weight: 222 lb (101 kg)

Career information
- Playing career: 2013–2015
- Position: Power forward

Career history
- 2013–2014: BSW
- 2014–2015: Omonia

Career highlights
- DBL All-Rookie Team (2014)

Roman Grigoryev (born November 16, 1990) is a Russian-Dutch former professional basketball player. Grigoryev is 2.00 m tall and primarily played the power forward position. He played two seasons professionally in respectively the Netherlands and on Cyprus.

== Career ==
Grigoryev played three seasons for the under-23 team of Spartak Primore Vladivostok from 2010 till 2013.

On June 24, 2013, Grigoryev signed with Maxxcom BSW in the Netherlands. Grigoryev got a place in the DBL All-Rookie Team, after he averaged 12.1 points and 5.3 rebounds in 12 league games.

For the 2014–15 season he signed with the Cypriotic team Omonia Nicosia.

== Honors ==
- DBL All-Rookie Team (1): 2013–14
