= Ian Hanavan =

American-Belgian basketball player

Personal information
- Born: August 15, 1980 (age 46) Moline, Illinois
- Listed height: 6 ft 8 in (2.03 m)

Career information
- High school: Moline (Moline, Illinois)
- College: UIC (1998–2000); Evansville (2000–2003)
- NBA draft: 2003: undrafted
- Playing career: 2003–2016
- Position: Power forward
- Number: 25
- Coaching career: 2018–present

Career history

Playing
- 2003–2004: Omniworld Almere
- 2004–2007: Leuven Bears
- 2007–2008: Antwerp Giants
- 2008–2009: Prostějov
- 2009–2010: CEZ Nymburk
- 2010–2011: APOEL
- 2011–2013: Leuven Bears
- 2013–2016: Okapi Aalstar

Coaching
- 2018–2019: Beijing Ducks (assistant)
- 2020–2021: Phoenix Brussels
- 2022–2023: RPC Anderlecht

Career highlights
- Belgian Supercup champion (2014); Cypriot Super Cup champion (2011); DBL All-Star (2004); DBL Statistical Player of the Year (2004)

Ian Hanavan (born August 15, 1980) is an American-born Belgian retired basketball player and current coach. He last coached Phoenix Brussels. Standing at 6 ft 8 in (2.03 m), Hanavan played as power forward.

== Professional career ==
In October 2007, Hanavan signed with Antwerp Giants.

On August 2, 2013, Hanavan signed with Okapi Aalstar for the 2013–14 season.

On August 23, 2016, the retirement of Hanavan was announced.

== Coaching career ==
In 2018, Hanavan started his coaching career as assistant with the Beijing Ducks in the Chinese Basketball Association (CBA). On March 13, 2020, Hanavan was hired as head coach of Phoenix Brussels for the 2020–21 season.

On October 18, 2021, Hanavan was fired by Brussels after a disappointing 1–3 start in the BNXT League.

== Personal ==
Hanavan received Belgian citizenship in 2009.

== Honours ==
=== Club ===
APOEL B.C.

- Cypriot Supercup (1): 2011

Okapi Aalstar

- Belgian Supercup (1): 2014

=== Individual ===
BC Omniworld Almere

- DBL All-Star (1): 2004
- DBL Statistical Player of the Year (1): 2003–04
