= Yannick Franke =

Dutch basketball player (born 1996)

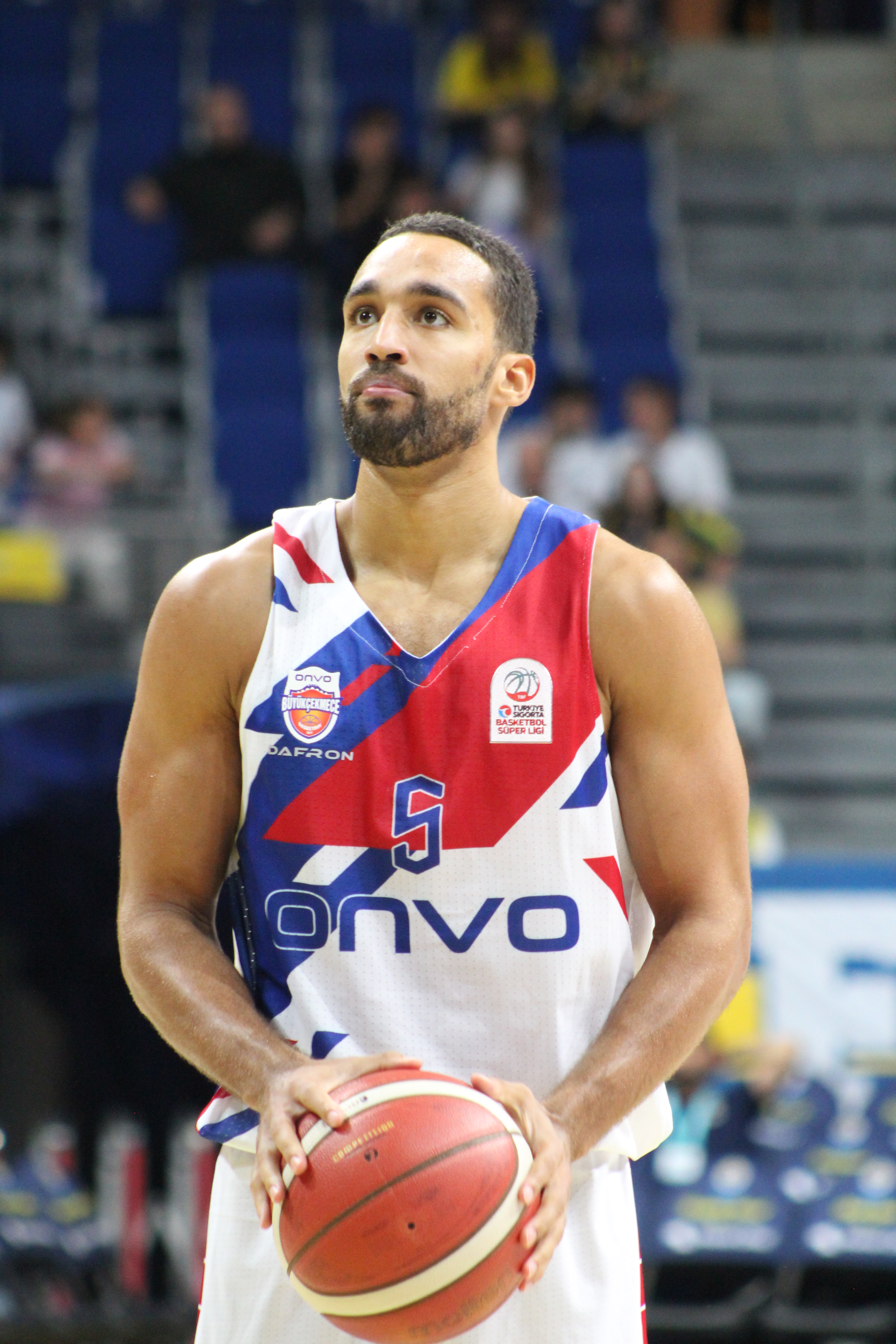
- Franke playing for the Büyükçekmece Basketbol in 2024

No. 5 – Neptūnas Klaipėda
- Position: Shooting guard
- League: LKL; EuroCup

Personal information
- Born: 21 May 1996 (age 30) Haarlem, Netherlands
- Listed height: 6 ft 5 in (1.96 m)
- Listed weight: 185 lb (84 kg)

Career information
- NBA draft: 2018: undrafted
- Playing career: 2013–present

Career history
- 2013: ZZ Leiden
- 2013–2015: Rotterdam
- 2015–2016: Donar
- 2016: Bisons Loimaa
- 2017: Zadar
- 2017–2018: Aquila Trento
- 2018–2019: Pieno žvaigždės
- 2019–2020: Hamburg Towers
- 2020: SLUC Nancy
- 2020–2021: Start Lublin
- 2021: Pieno žvaigždės
- 2021–2022: Trefl Sopot
- 2022: Andorra
- 2022–2023: PAOK Thessaloniki
- 2023–2024: Palencia
- 2024–2025: Büyükçekmece Basketbol
- 2025–2026: Petkim Spor
- 2026–present: Neptūnas Klaipėda

Career highlights
- Greek League All-Star (2022); DBL All-Rookie Team (2014); DBL Most Improved Player (2015); DBL MVP Under 23 (2015); DBL All-Star (2015); DBL Top Scorer (2015)

Yannick Ayrton Franke (born 21 May 1996) is a Dutch professional basketball player for Neptūnas Klaipėda of the Lithuanian Basketball League (LKL) and the EuroCup. He also represents the Netherlands national basketball team in international competition. Franke mainly plays at the shooting guard position.

== Professional career ==
Franke started his professional career with the Dutch powerhouse ZZ Leiden in the 2013–14 season. In December he transferred to lower-ranked Challenge Sports Rotterdam, where he could get more playing time.

In the 2014–15 season, Franke had a break-out year. He was the youngest scoring champion in the history of the Dutch DBL, after he recorded 19.6 points per game at age 19. He also won the DBL MVP Under 23 and DBL Most Improved Player Awards.

For the 2015–16 season, Franke signed with Donar Groningen. On 15 February 2016, Franke left Donar.

On 29 February 2016, he signed for the remainder of the season with Bisons Loimaa in Finnish Korisliiga.

On 20 September 2016, Franke signed with Promitheas Patras in Greece, but left the team without appearing in a single game. On 16 October 2016, he signed a three-year contract with AEK Athens in Greece, but was released on 25 November, without appearing in an official game of the team.

On 11 January 2017, he signed with Croatian club Zadar. On 31 March 2017, he left Zadar after averaging 6 points and 2 rebounds per game in the ABA League.

On 11 August 2017, Franke signed a two-year deal with Italian club Aquila Basket Trento. In the 2017–18 LBA season, Franke reached the finals with Trento, where it lost to Olimpia Milano.

In October 2018, Franke signed with Pieno žvaigždės of the Lithuanian LKL.

On 12 July 2019, Franke signed a one-year contract with Hamburg Towers of the German Basketball Bundesliga (BBL).

On 8 August 2020, Franke signed with SLUC Nancy of the French LNB Pro B.

On 17 December 2020, Franke signed with Start Lublin.

On 2 August 2021, he signed with Trefl Sopot of the Polish Basketball League.

On 2 March 2022, he signed with MoraBanc Andorra of the Spanish Liga ACB.

On 11 July 2022, Franke signed with PAOK of the Greek Basket League and the Basketball Champions League. In 31 domestic league games, he averaged 15.7 points, 4.8 rebounds, 2.5 assists and 2.5 turnovers, playing around 27 minutes per contest.

On 27 July 2023, Franke signed with Palencia of the Liga ACB.

On 29 February 2024, he signed with ONVO Büyükçekmece of the Basketbol Süper Ligi (BSL).

On July 2, 2025, he signed with Petkim Spor of the Basketbol Süper Ligi (BSL).

On July 10, 2026, Franke signed one–year contract with Neptūnas Klaipėda of the Lithuanian Basketball League (LKL) and the EuroCup.

== International career ==
Franke made his debut for the Dutch national basketball team on 31 July 2015 in a 55–59 loss against Germany. Franke was a member of the Dutch team that played at EuroBasket 2015, where the team had a 1–4 record. Franke played in one game, a 72–78 loss against Croatia, and he scored 3 points in the match.

== Family ==
Franke comes from a much-lauded basketball family. Father Rolf Franke was eight times Dutch basketball champion in the 1990s, played 60 international matches for the Netherlands and was the coach of ZZ Leiden from 2018 to 2020. Grandfather Wim Franke was regarded as one of the best basketball players in the country in the 1960s and made 47 international appearances.

== Honours ==
=== Individual ===
- DBL All-Rookie Team: 2014–15
- DBL Most Improved Player: 2014–15
- DBL MVP Under 23: 2014–15
- DBL All-Star: 2015
- DBL scoring champion: 2014–15
- LKL Newcomer of the Year: 2018–19
- Eurobasket.com LKL All-Imports team: 2018–19
- Eurobasket.com All-BBL Honorable mention: 2019–20
- GBL All-Star: 2022
