= Daan Rosenmuller =

Dutch basketball player

Personal information
- Born: July 15, 1995 (age 31) Beverwijk, Netherlands
- Listed height: 193 cm (6 ft 4 in)

Career information
- Playing career: 2014–present
- Position: Shooting guard
- Number: 13

Career history
- 2014–2017: BSW
- 2017–2019: BAL

Career highlights
- DBL Rookie of the Year (2015); DBL All-Rookie Team (2015)

Daan Rosenmuller (born 15 July 1995) is a Dutch professional basketball player, who last played for BAL of the Dutch Basketball League (DBL).

== Professional career ==
Rosenmuller started his professional career with BS Weert in the Dutch Basketball League (DBL) during the 2014–15 season. He averaged 9.3 points and 3.7 rebounds in 32.6 minutes per game, which earned him the DBL Rookie of the Year award.

On August 15, 2017, Rosenmuller was announced by BAL, the team which replaced BSW as team from Weert in the DBL.
