= 2015 DBL Playoffs =

Basketball tournament

The 2015 DBL Playoffs was the postseason tournament of the Dutch Basketball League's (DBL) 2014–15 season. The tournament concluded with Donar Groningen playing SPM Shoeters Den Bosch in the Finals.

== Bracket ==
Quarterfinals (Best of 3)
(4) Landstede	105	81
(5) Challenge Sports Rotterdam	62	73
(3) Donar	101	87
(6) Aris Leeuwarden	66	73

Semifinals (Best of 7)
(1) SPM Shoeters	85	66	74	86	82	68	87
(4) Landstede	70	87	88	73	63	78	77
(2) ZZ Leiden	86	63	69	59	85	71
(3) Donar	80	78	79	63	56	77

Finals (Best of 7)
(1) SPM Shoeters	93	70	80	62	85
(3) Donar	54	61	72	67	64

Because the number of teams in the DBL decreased to 9, a new Playoff format was chosen. After the seeds 3 till 6 played a best-of-three series in the quarter-finals, the semi-finals and finals would be played in a best-of-seven system.
