= 2021 Men's EuroHockey Indoor Club Cup =

Cancelled indoor hockey tournament

Tournament details
- Host country: Turkey
- City: Alanya
- Dates: Cancelled
- Teams: 8 (from 8 associations)
- Venue: Alanya Atatürk Spor Salonu

The 2021 Men's EuroHockey Indoor Club Cup was scheduled to be the 32nd edition of the Men's EuroHockey Indoor Club Cup, Europe's premier men's club indoor hockey tournament organized by the European Hockey Federation. It was supposed to be held at the Alanya Atatürk Spor Salonu in Alanya, Turkey from 12 to 14 February 2021. On 3 November 2020, it was announced all EuroHockey Indoor Club Championships were cancelled due to the COVID-19 pandemic in Europe.

== Teams ==
Participating clubs qualified based on their country's final rankings from the 2020 competition. The champions from the top six countries from last year's edition together with the top two from the 2020 EuroHockey Indoor Club Trophy were qualified. Croatia and Turkey were the two promoted countries that replaced Belgium and Sweden.

Pool	Teams	
A	(Germany) Rot-Weiss Köln	(Poland) Pomorzanin Torun
A	(Spain) Barcelona	(Croatia) Zelina
B	(Austria) Post SV	(Belarus) Minsk
B	(Russia) Dinamo Elektrostal	(Turkey) Gaziantep

== See also ==
- 2021 Euro Hockey League
- 2021 Women's EuroHockey Indoor Club Cup
