= Marquise Simmons =

American basketball player

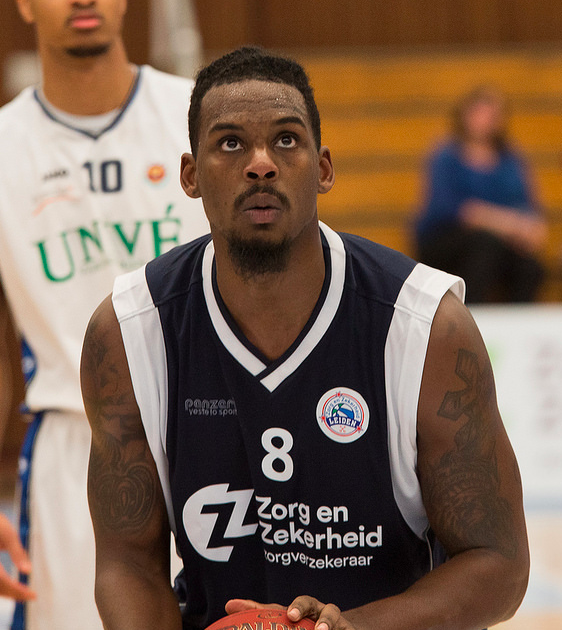
- Simmons playing for ZZ Leiden in 2016

Free agent
- Position: Power forward

Personal information
- Born: November 9, 1989 (age 37) Washington, D.C.
- Listed height: 6 ft 8 in (2.03 m)
- Listed weight: 229 lb (104 kg)

Career information
- High school: Central (Washington, D.C.)
- College: St. Bonaventure (2009–2014)
- NBA draft: 2014: undrafted
- Playing career: 2014–2017

Career history
- 2014–2015: Aris Leeuwarden
- 2015: Njarðvík
- 2016: ZZ Leiden
- 2016–2017: Orchies

Career highlights
- DBL All-Star (2015)

Marquise Simmons (born November 9, 1989) is an American former professional basketball player. He played collegiately in the Atlantic 10 Conference for the St. Bonaventure Bonnies.

== Professional career ==
Simmons turned professional in 2014, when he signed his first contract with Aris Leeuwarden.

In 2015, Simmons signed with Njarðvík of the Icelandic Úrvalsdeild karla. He was released by the club in December 2015. In 9 league games, Simmons averaged 18.7 points and 11.4 rebounds.

On January 11, 2016Simmons signed with Zorg en Zekerheid Leiden.
