= Lucas Steijn =

Dutch basketball player

Personal information
- Born: 1 August 1986 (age 40) Muiderberg, Netherlands
- Listed height: 6 ft 10 in (2.08 m)
- Listed weight: 250 lb (113 kg)

Career information
- High school: Middleburg Academy (Middleburg, Virginia)
- College: Indiana University (2004–2005); Logan College (2005–2007); Idaho State (2007–2009)
- NBA draft: 2009: undrafted
- Playing career: 2013–2017
- Position: Center

Career history
- 2013–2014: Apollo Amsterdam
- 2014–2017: Rotterdam

Career highlights
- DBL All-Rookie Team (2014)

Lucas Steijn (born August 1, 1986) is a Dutch former basketball player. Standing at 6 ft 10 in (2.08 m), Steijn usually plays as center.

== Professional career ==
In the 2013–14 season, Steijn played his first professional season with BC Apollo from Amsterdam. He made the DBL All-Rookie Team, after averaging 10.8 points, 6.3 rebounds in 25.4 minutes per game.

In September 2014, Steijn signed with Challenge Sports Rotterdam.
