= Rogier Jansen =

Dutch basketball player & coach (born 1984)

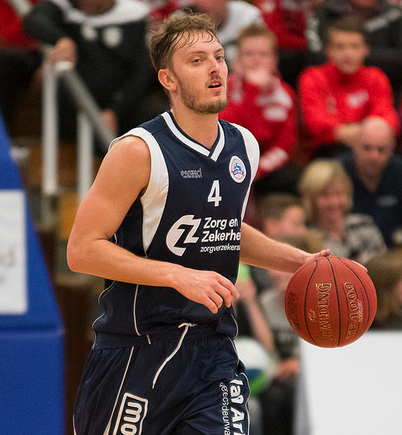
- Jansen playing for ZZ Leiden in 2016

Personal information
- Born: 29 October 1984 (age 42) Amsterdam, Netherlands
- Listed height: 1.88 m (6 ft 2 in)

Career information
- Playing career: 2003–2018
- Position: Shooting guard
- Coaching career: 2018–present

Career history

Playing
- 2002–2003: Ricoh Astronauts
- 2003–2005: Donar Groningen
- 2005: Omniworld Almere
- 2005–2006: Leuven Bears
- 2006–2007: Polynorm Giants
- 2007–2009: Donar Groningen
- 2009–2011: EiffelTowers Den Bosch
- 2012–2013: Donar Groningen
- 2013–2014: Den Helder Kings
- 2014–2017: ZZ Leiden
- 2017: Clavijo
- 2017–2018: Ourense
- 2018: Estela

Coaching
- 2018–2019: Apollo Amsterdam (assistant)

Career highlights
- 2× DBL champion (2004, 2012); Dutch Cup champion (2005); DBL Sixth Man of the Year (2016); 4× DBL All-Star (2009, 2014–2016); DBL MVP Under 23 (2007); DBL Rookie of the Year (2004)

Rogier Jansen (born 29 August 1984) is a Dutch retired basketball player and current coach. Jansen has represented the Dutch national basketball team multiple times.

== Professional career ==
On 2 July 2003 Jansen signed with Hanzevast Capitals - or Donar - from Groningen. In the 2003–04 season Jansen won the Dutch national championship with the team. In 2005, he got his first NBB Cup.

In the 2005–06 season Jansen played for BC Omniworld in Almere.

Jansen returned to Groningen in 2007.

After two seasons with the Capitals, he signed with EiffelTowers Den Bosch. In the 2011–12 season Jansen won the Dutch Basketball League with Den Bosch. It was his second national championship.

During the 2012–13 season, Jansen returned to his former club Donar, now named GasTerra Flames. His contract wasn't extended.

On 28 June 2013 it was announced Jansen signed with the Den Helder Kings for the 2013–14 season.

In August 2014, Jansen signed a 2-year deal with Zorg en Zekerheid Leiden. In the 2015–16 season, Jansen was named DBL Sixth Man of the Year.

On 26 October 2017, Jansen signed with CB Clavijo of the Spanish second tier LEB Oro. He transferred to Ourense in November 2017. In March 2018, Jansen signed with his third Spanish club of the season, CD Estela of the Liga EBA.

== Coaching career ==
Jansen was assistant coach with Apollo Amsterdam in the 2018–19 season.

== Honours ==
=== Club ===
Donar Groningen

- Dutch Basketball League (1): 2003–04
- NBB Cup (1): 2004–05

EiffelTowers Den Bosch

- Dutch Basketball League (1): 2011–12

=== Individual ===
- DBL MVP Under 23 (1): 2006–07
- DBL All-Star (4): 2009, 2014,2015,2016
- DBL Rookie of the Year (1): 2003–04
