= Darius Theus =

American former basketball player (born 1990)

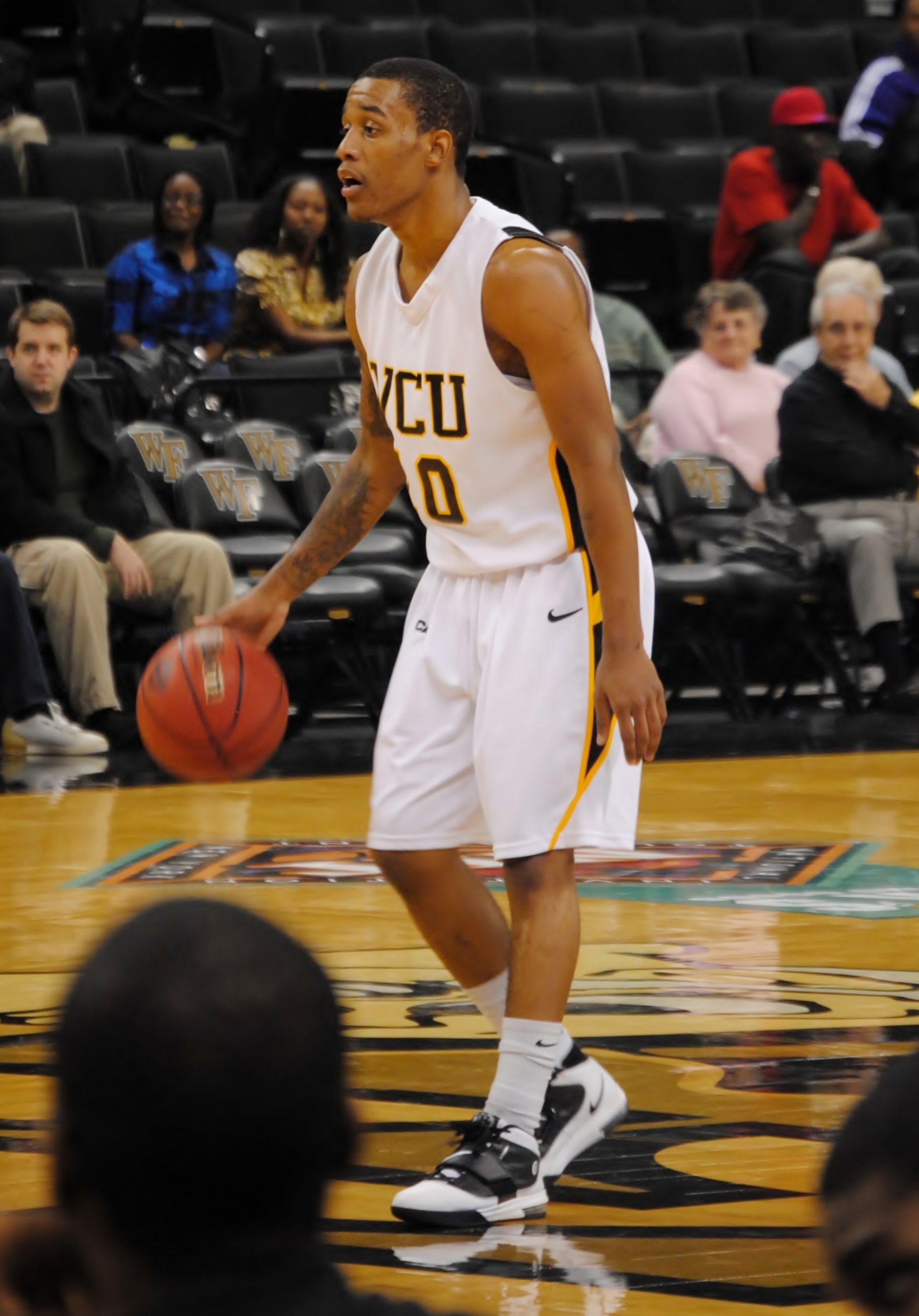
- Theus for VCU in 2010

Virginia Cavaliers
- Title: Assistant coach
- League: Atlantic Coast Conference

Personal information
- Born: December 1, 1990 (age 35) Portsmouth, Virginia, U.S.
- Listed height: 6 ft 3 in (1.91 m)
- Listed weight: 200 lb (91 kg)

Career information
- High school: I. C. Norcom (Portsmouth, Virginia)
- College: VCU (2009–2013)
- NBA draft: 2013: undrafted
- Playing career: 2013–2016
- Position: Point guard
- Number: 10, 45
- Coaching career: 2022–present

Career history

Playing
- 2013–2014: Aris Leeuwarden
- 2015: Rasta Vechta
- 2015–2016: Nürnberg Falcons

Coaching
- 2022–2023: Siena (assistant)
- 2023–2025: VCU (assistant)
- 2025–present: Virginia (assistant)

Career highlights
- DBL All-Star (2014); DBL Statistical Player of the Year (2014); DBL All-Defense Team (2014); DBL scoring leader (2014); DBL steals leader (2014); Third-team All-CAA (2012); CAA tournament MVP (2012); Atlantic 10 All-Defensive Team (2013)

Darius Theus (born December 1, 1990) is an American former basketball player and coach who currently is an assistant coach for the Virginia Cavaliers of the Atlantic Coast Conference (ACC). He previously coached at VCU, where he played collegiately. He played professionally in the Netherlands and Germany.

== Professional career ==
In 2013, Theus signed his first pro contract with Aris Leeuwarden, a team in the Dutch Basketball League. He led the DBL in scoring, steals and field goal percentage in the 2013–14 season. Theus got a place in the All-Defense Team of the DBL as well and was also named DBL Statistical Player of the Year. Aris went into the Playoffs as the 7-seed and lost 2–0 to SPM Shoeters Den Bosch.

== Coaching career ==
He started as Director of Player Development with the Texas Longhorns on April 20, 2017. He held the position for the 2017–18 season.

== Honours ==
Aris Leeuwarden

- DBL All-Star (1): 2014
- DBL Statistical Player of the Year (1): 2014
- DBL All-Defense Team (1): 2014
- DBL scoring leader (1): 2014
- DBL steals leader (1): 2014
