= Skip Mills =

American basketball player

Free agent
- Position: Shooting guard

Personal information
- Born: March 10, 1985 (age 41) Indianapolis, Indiana, U.S.
- Listed height: 195 cm (6 ft 5 in)
- Listed weight: 93 kg (205 lb)

Career information
- High school: North Central (Indianapolis, Indiana)
- College: Ball State (2003–2007)
- NBA draft: 2007: undrafted

Career history
- 2009–2010: Cairns Taipans
- 2009–2010: Fort Wayne Mad Ants
- 2010–2011: EiffelTowers Den Bosch
- 2011–2012: Szolnoki Olaj
- 2012–2013: Elizur Ashkelon
- 2013: Metros de Santiago
- 2013–2014: Barak Netanya
- 2016–2017: Sopron

Career highlights
- All-DBL Team (2011); DBL Statistical Player of the Year (2011); NB I/A champion (2012); Hungarian Cup champion (2012)

Julien "Skip" Mills (born March 10, 1985) is an American basketball player. Standing at 195 cm (6 ft 5 in), Mills usually plays as shooting guard.

== Professional career ==
In August 2009, Mills signed with Cairns Taipans of the NBL.

In April 2011, Mills was honored with the DBL Statistical Player of the Year award during his season with Den Bosch, after averaging a league-high efficiency rating of 18.4. Additionally, Mills was named to the All-DBL Team.
