= 2021 Men's Euro Hockey League =

2021 Euro Hockey League
Tournament details
- Host country: Netherlands
- City: Amstelveen
- Dates: 3–5 April
- Teams: 4 (from 4 associations)
- Venue: Wagener Stadium

Final positions
- Champions: (Netherlands) Bloemendaal (4th title)
- Runner-up: (Spain) Atlètic Terrassa
- Third place: (Belgium) Léopold

Tournament statistics
- Matches played: 4
- Goals scored: 20 (5 per match)
- Top scorer(s): (Spain) Pau Cunill (Belgium) Max Muschs (3 goals)

The 2021 Euro Hockey League was the 14th season of the Euro Hockey League, Europe's premier club field hockey tournament, organized by the European Hockey Federation.

Due to the COVID-19 pandemic in Europe a different format was used with only one event and 16 less teams. The four participating teams were the four original seeded clubs for the original format. The semi-finals were played on 3 April and the final on 5 April 2021 at the Wagener Stadium in Amstelveen, Netherlands.

Bloemendaal won a record fourth title after defeating first time finalists Atlètic Terrassa 5–2 in the final. Léopold won their first medal after defeating Uhlenhorst Mülheim 4–2 in the bronze medal match.

== Effects of the COVID-19 pandemic ==
In May 2020 it was announced that the first round, usually being played in October, could not be played due to the COVID-19 pandemic in Europe and the format for this season would be changed. On 11 February 2021 it was announced the tournament would be played with only four teams and behind closed doors. The rest of the teams participated in the 2021 Men's Euro Hockey League Cup.

=== Original format ===
Originally the number of teams was reduced to only 12 from the usual 20 teams. The remaining teams would have played in the 2021 EHL Cup. The different number of teams also meant a new format for this season. The number one seed from the top four ranked nations received a bye to the Final 8. The remaining eight sides would have played in four knock-out matches for a chance to join them in the Final 8; the losers would subsequently contest ranking matches for 9th and 11th place.

== Final4 ==
=== Bracket ===
Semi-finals
3 April
(Germany) Uhlenhorst Mülheim | 2
(Spain) Atlètic Terrassa | 3
3 April
(Netherlands) Bloemendaal (s.o.) | 1 (5)
(Belgium) Léopold | 1 (4)

Final
5 April
(Spain) Atlètic Terrassa | 2
(Netherlands) Bloemendaal | 5
Third place
4 April
(Germany) Uhlenhorst Mülheim | 2
(Belgium) Léopold | 4

=== Semi-finals ===
3 April 2021
16:15

| Bloemendaal (Netherlands) | 1–1 | (Belgium) Léopold |
|---|---|---|
| Jolie 48' | Report | Baumgarten 33' |
Penalties
| Croon (penalty shoot-out scored); T. Brinkman (penalty shoot-out scored); Fuchs (penalty shoot-out scored); Schuurman (penalty shoot-out missed); Van Doren (penalty shoot-out scored); Croon (penalty shoot-out scored) | 5–4 | (penalty shoot-out missed) Degroote; (penalty shoot-out scored) Plennevaux; (penalty shoot-out scored) Zimmer; (penalty shoot-out scored) Poncelet; (penalty shoot-out scored) Baumgarten; (penalty shoot-out missed) Poncelet |

Umpires:
Michiel Otten (NED)
Ben Goentgen (GER)

3 April 2021
18:45

| Uhlenhorst Mülheim (Germany) | 2–3 | (Spain) Atlètic Terrassa |
|---|---|---|
| Herzbruch 11', 59' | Report | Bonastre 43'; Pa. Cunill 58', 60+' |

Umpires:
Sebastien Michielsen (BEL)
Coen van Bunge (NED)

=== Third and fourth place ===
4 April 2021
16:00

| Uhlenhorst Mülheim (Germany) | 2–4 | (Belgium) Léopold |
|---|---|---|
| Nystroem 8', 23' | Report | Muschs 23', 27', 53'; Cuvelier 51' |

Umpires:
Michiel Otten (NED)
Sebastien Michielsen (BEL)

=== Final ===
5 April 2021
13:30

| Atlètic Terrassa (Spain) | 2–5 | (Netherlands) Bloemendaal |
|---|---|---|
| Pa. Cunill 10'; Bonastre 59' | Report | Van der Drift 3'; T. Brinkman 5', 36'; Fuchs 17'; Swaen 50' |

Umpires:
Ben Goentgen (GER)
Coen van Bunge (NED)

== Statistics ==
=== Final standings ===
1. (Netherlands) Bloemendaal
2. (Spain) Atlètic Terrassa
3. (Belgium) Léopold
4. (Germany) Uhlenhorst Mülheim

=== Goalscorers ===
| Rank | Player | Team | FG | PC | PS | Goals |
|---|---|---|---|---|---|---|
| 1 | (Spain) Pau Cunill | (Spain) Atlètic Terrassa | 0 | 3 | 0 | 3 |
| 1 | (Belgium) Max Muschs | (Belgium) Léopold | 0 | 3 | 0 | 3 |
| 3 | (Netherlands) Thierry Brinkman | (Netherlands) Bloemendaal | 2 | 0 | 0 | 2 |
| 3 | (Spain) Jordi Bonastre | (Spain) Atlètic Terrassa | 1 | 1 | 0 | 2 |
| 3 | (Germany) Frederik Nystroem | (Germany) Uhlenhorst Mülheim | 1 | 1 | 0 | 2 |
| 3 | (Germany) Timm Herzbruch | (Germany) Uhlenhorst Mülheim | 0 | 1 | 1 | 2 |
| 7 | (Netherlands) Yannick van der Drift | (Netherlands) Bloemendaal | 1 | 0 | 0 | 1 |
| 7 | (France) Gaspard Baumgarten | (Belgium) Léopold | 1 | 0 | 0 | 1 |
| 7 | (Germany) Florian Fuchs | (Netherlands) Bloemendaal | 0 | 1 | 0 | 1 |
| 7 | (Netherlands) Wouter Jolie | (Netherlands) Bloemendaal | 0 | 1 | 0 | 1 |
| 7 | (Belgium) Dimitri Cuvelier | (Belgium) Léopold | 0 | 1 | 0 | 1 |
| 7 | (Netherlands) Tim Swaen | (Netherlands) Bloemendaal | 0 | 0 | 1 | 1 |

== See also ==
- 2021 Euro Hockey League Women
- 2021 Men's EuroHockey Indoor Club Cup
