= Tom Snikkers =

American-Dutch basketball player

Personal information
- Born: December 20, 1990 (age 35)
- Listed height: 6 ft 5 in (1.96 m)
- Listed weight: 220 lb (100 kg)

Career information
- High school: Unity Christian (Hudsonville, Michigan)
- College: Calvin (2009–2013)
- NBA draft: 2013: undrafted
- Playing career: 2013–2014
- Position: Small forward
- Number: 11

Career history
- 2013–2014: Aris Leeuwarden

Career highlights
- DBL All-Rookie Team (2014)

Tom Snikkers (born December 20, 1990) is an American-Dutch retired basketball player who played collegiate for the Calvin Knights where he was a starter all four years. He was awarded First Team All-Conference his final three seasons at Calvin, and was awarded All-American honors during his senior campaign. Tom went on to play one season for Aris Leeuwarden of the Dutch Basketball League (DBL).

== Career ==
For the 2013–14 Snikkers signed with Aris Leeuwarden. After his first professional season, Snikkers retired.

== Honors ==
Calvin College

- MIAA All-Conference Team (3): 2011, 2012, 2013

Aris Leeuwarden

- DBL All-Rookie Team: 2014
