= Gary Buchanan =

American basketball player

Personal information
- Born: June 30, 1980 (age 46) St. Louis, Missouri, U.S.
- Listed height: 6 ft 3 in (1.91 m)
- Listed weight: 205 lb (93 kg)

Career information
- High school: Valley Park (St. Louis, Missouri)
- College: Villanova (1999–2003)
- NBA draft: 2003: undrafted
- Playing career: 2003–2011
- Position: Point guard / shooting guard
- Number: 22

Career history
- 2003–2004: Donar
- 2004–2006: Swans Gmunden
- 2006–2007: Donar
- 2008–2009: Gimnasia Indalo
- 2009–2010: Sionista
- 2010–2011: Odesa
- 2011: 9 de Julio de Río Tercero

Career highlights
- Eredivisie champion (2004)

Gary Buchanan (born June 30, 1980) is an American former professional basketball player. He played college basketball for Villanova University before starting a professional career. His jersey number was 22. Buchanan is from St. Louis, Missouri. In high school, he went to Valley Park. He played as a guard. In the 2010–11 season Buchanan played for BC Odesa.
