= Joe Burton (basketball) =

American basketball player (born 1990)

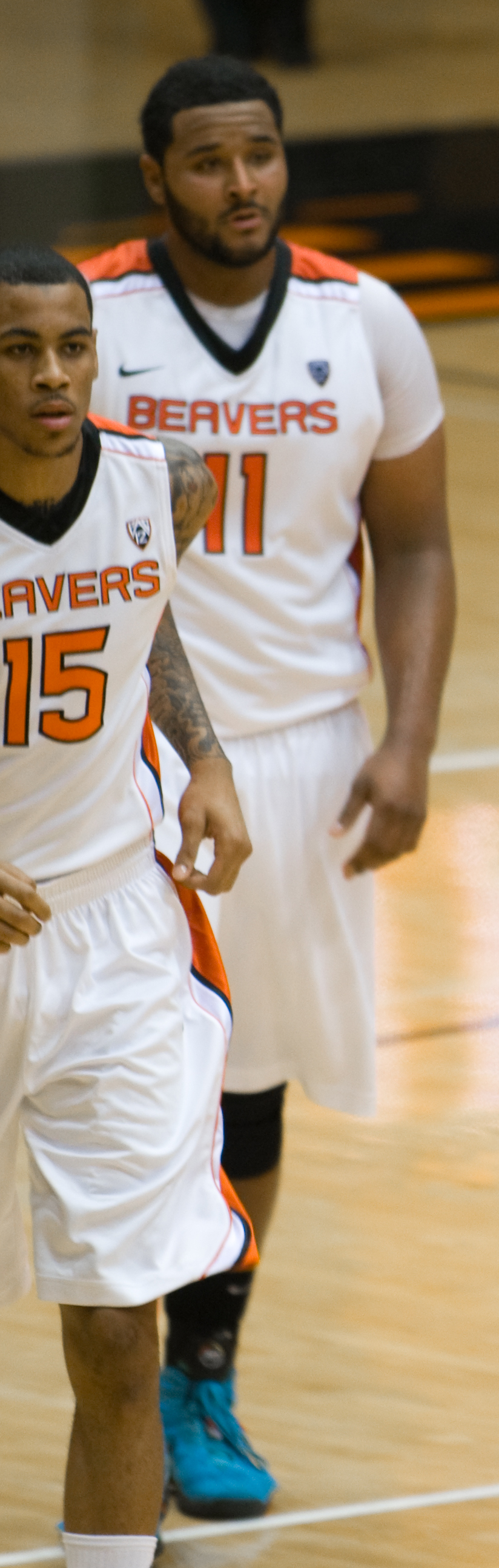
- Burton with Oregon State in 2012

Free Agent
- Position: Center / power forward

Personal information
- Born: November 2, 1990 (age 35) San Jacinto, California, U.S.
- Listed height: 6 ft 7 in (2.01 m)
- Listed weight: 288 lb (131 kg)

Career information
- High school: West Valley (Hemet, California)
- College: Oregon State (2009–2013)
- NBA draft: 2013: undrafted
- Playing career: 2013–present

Career history
- 2013–2014: Aalborg Vikings
- 2014–2015: Landstede Zwolle
- 2015–2016: ALM Évreux
- 2016–2017: Chorale Roanne
- 2017–2018: Aomori Wat's
- 2018–2019: ADA Blois
- 2019–2020: Chorale Roanne
- 2020: Souffelweyersheim
- 2020: Trepça
- 2020-2021: KTP Basket
- 2022-2023: BC Orchies
- 2023—: ALM Évreux

Career highlights
- French Second Division MVP (2016); French 2nd Division Cup winner (2017); French Second Division Cup MVP (2017); Dutch League Statistical Player of the Year (2015); All-Dutch League Team (2015); All-Dutch League Defense Team (2015)

Joseph William Burton (born November 2, 1990) is an American professional basketball player for, who lastly played for BC Orchies of the Nationale Masculine 1. He played four seasons collegiate for the Oregon State Beavers men's basketball team. He usually plays as center or a power forward.

== College career ==
Burton played collegiate for the Oregon State Beavers. He is a member of the Soboba Band of Luiseno Indians, one of the Luiseño Native American tribes of southern California. He became the first Native American man to earn a basketball scholarship at a Pac-10 Conference (now Pac-12) school. In Burton's senior year at college he averaged 11.0 ppg and 6.4 rpg in 32 games. He is the only Oregon State player to record over 1,000 points, 700 rebounds and 300 assists.

== Professional career ==
Burton started his career in 2013 with Aalborg Vikings. In the Danish Basketligaen, Burton averaged 22 points, 12.5 rebounds and 4 assists.

For the 2014–15 season, Burton signed with Landstede Basketbal. At the end of the regular season, Burton won the DBL Statistical Player of the Year Award and was named to the All-DBL Team and DBL All-Defense Team.

For the 2015–16 season, Burton signed with ALM Évreux Basket. He was named the Most Valuable Player of the LNB Pro B.

On August 4, 2016, Burton signed with Chorale Roanne Basket, another club from the LNB Pro B.

On July 10, 2018, Burton signed with ADA Blois of the French first tier Pro A.

On August 13, 2019, he has signed with his old team Chorale Roanne Basket.

On August 17, 2020, he has signed with KTP Basket of the Finnish first tier Korisliiga
