= 2003–04 Eredivisie (basketball) =

- Season: 2003–04
- Teams: 10

Regular season
- Top seed: EiffelTowers Nijmegen
- ULEB Cup: MPC Capitals; Tulip Den Bosch
- Season MVP: Travis Reed (MPC Capitals)

Finals
- Champions: MPC Capitals (2nd title)
- Runners-up: Tulip Den Bosch

Statistical leaders
Points	Marcel Huijbens	19.8
Rebounds	Ian Hanavan	12.2
Assists	Gregory Harris	7.3

The 2003–04 Eredivisie season was the 44th season of the Eredivisie in basketball, the highest professional basketball league in the Netherlands. MPC Capitals won their second national title.

== Teams ==
Locations of teams in the 2003–04 Eredivisie.

Newly established club Fun4All Bergen op Zoom made its debut in the Eredivisie this season.

=== Arenas and locations ===
Club	Location	Venue	Capacity	Head coach
Cape Holland Den Helder	Den Helder	Quelderduijn	Unknown	
Demon Astronauts	Amsterdam	Sporthallen Zuid	3,000	(Israel) Arik Shivek
EiffelTowers Nijmegen	Nijmegen	De Horstacker	1,200	(Netherlands) Marco van den Berg
Fun 4 All	Bergen op Zoom	De Boulevard	900	(United States) Otis Loyd
Landstede Basketbal	Zwolle	ZBC Hal	Unknown	(Netherlands) Herman van den Belt
MPC Capitals	Groningen	MartiniPlaza	4,350	(Netherlands) Ton Boot
Omniworld Almere	Almere	Topsortcentrum Almere	3,000	(Netherlands) Marco van den Berg
Rotterdam	Rotterdam	Topsportcentrum Rotterdam	1,000	(Netherlands) Erik Braal
Solskin Weert	Weert	Sporthal Boshoven	1,000	
Tulip Den Bosch	's-Hertogenbosch	Maaspoort	2,800	(Netherlands) Toon van Helfteren

== Regular season ==
Pos.	Team	GP	W	L	Points
1	EiffelTowers Nijmegen	36	29	7	58
2	Demon Astronauts	36	29	7	58
3	MPC Capitals	36	25	11	50
4	Tulip Den Bosch	36	23	13	46
5	Landstede Basketbal	36	18	20	36
6	Omniworld Almere	36	16	20	32
7	Cape Holland Den Helder	36	14	22	28
8	Solskin Weert	36	11	25	22
9	Rotterdam Basketbal	36	8	28	16
10	Fun 4 All	36	7	29	14

== Playoffs ==
=== Bracket ===
Quarterfinals
1	EiffelTowers Nijmegen	2
8	Solskin Weert	0
4	Tulip Den Bosch	2
5	Landstede Basketbal	0
2	Demon Astronauts	2
7	Cape Holland Den Helder	0
3	MPC Capitals	2
6	BC Omniworld Almere	0

Semifinals
1	EiffelTowers Nijmegen	1
4	Tulip Den Bosch	3
2	Demon Astronauts	2
3	MPC Capitals	3

Finals
4	Tulip Den Bosch	2
3	MPC Capitals	4

=== Finals ===
15 May
19:30

Boxscore

MPC Capitals 68, Tulip Den Bosch 54
Pts: Gary Buchanan 23; Rebs: Travis Reed 14; Asts: Valmo Kriisa 5	Pts: Sam Jones 16; Rebs: Marcel Huijbens 8 Asts: Chip Jones 3
MPC Capitals lead 1–0

Martiniplaza, Groningen
Referees:
- Paul den Hartog
- Nico Zwiep

18 May
19:30

Boxscore

Tulip Den Bosch 73, MPC Capitals 62
Pts: Jones, Huijbens 21 each Rebs: Huijbens 13; Asts: Darnell Clavon 6	Pts: Gary Buchanan 21; Rebs: Travis Reed 10; Asts: Travis Reed 4
Series tied 1–1

Maaspoort, Den Bosch
Referees:
- Michel Zegwaard
- Henk Veenstra

20 May
19:30

Boxscore

MPC Capitals 87, Tulip Den Bosch 68
Pts: Gary Buchanan 25; Rebs: Daniel Novak 9 Asts: Jansen, Reed 4 each	Pts: Sam Jones 20; Rebs: Willie Jan Ackermans 11; Asts: Sam Jones 7
MPC Capital lead series 2–1

Martiniplaza, Groningen
Referees:
- Paul den Hartog
- Henk Veenstra

23 May
19:30

Boxscore

Tulip Den Bosch 77, MPC Capitals 68
Pts: Marcel Huijbens 21; Rebs: Marcel Huijbens 10; Asts: Sam Jones 6	Pts: Daniel Novak 18; Rebs: Eric Hinrichsen 7 Asts: Rogier Jansen 5
Series tied 2–2

Maaspoort, Den Bosch
Referees:
- Michel Zegwaard
- Henk Veenstra

25 May
19:30

Boxscore

MPC Capitals 90, Tulip Den Bosch 83
Pts: Daniel Novak 23; Rebs: Travis Reed 11; Asts: Buchanan, Kriisa 4	Pts: Marcel Huijbens 19; Rebs: Marcel Huijbens 10; Asts: Sam Jones 5
MPC Capitals lead series 3–2

Martiniplaza, Groningen
Referees:
- Michel Zegwaard
- Niko Zwiep

27 May
19:30

Boxscore

Tulip Den Bosch 88, MPC Capitals 96 (OT)
Pts: Marcel Huijbens 24; Rebs: Marcel Huijbens 10; Asts: Sam Jones 12	Pts: Travis Reed 34; Rebs: Eric Hinrichsen 12; Asts: Travis Reed 6
MPC Capitals win series 4–2

Maaspoort, Den Bosch
Referees:
- Michel Zegwaard
- Henk Veenstra
