= Travis Reed =

American basketball player

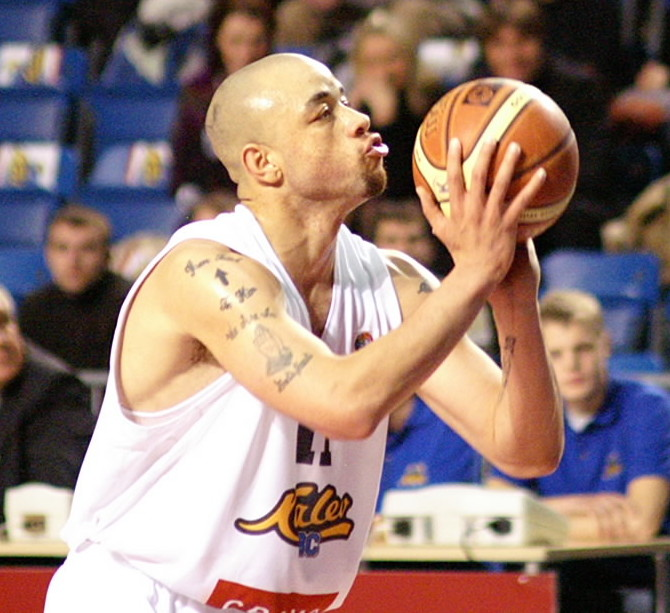
- Reed playing for Kalev in 2007

Personal information
- Born: August 6, 1979 (age 47) Los Angeles, California, U.S.
- Listed height: 6 ft 8 in (2.03 m)
- Listed weight: 226 lb (103 kg)

Career information
- High school: A. B. Miller (Fontana, California)
- College: UCLA (1997–1999); Long Beach State (2000–2002)
- NBA draft: 2002: undrafted
- Playing career: 2002–2012
- Position: Center / power forward
- Number: 13

Career history
- 2002–2003: Den Bosch
- 2003–2006: Hanzevast Capitals
- 2006–2008: BC Kalev
- 2008–2009: Mureș
- 2009–2010: Tallinna Kalev
- 2010–2011: Rockhampton Rockets
- 2011–2012: Saar-Pfalz Braves
- 2012: Rockhampton Rockets

Career highlights
- Dutch League MVP (2004); BBL MVP (2007); KML MVP (2007)

Travis Wayne Reed (born August 6, 1979) is an American former professional basketball player. Reed played college basketball for UCLA and Long Beach State. He played professionally in the Netherlands, Estonia, Romania, Australia and Germany.

== Professional career ==
He is left-handed and was known as a very effective player around the basket. He became an MVP of the Dutch League in the 2003–04 season, and won Dutch championship the same season with Hanzevast Capitals Groningen. In 2006, Reed joined BC Kalev/Cramo and with the team he won two Estonian Cups and two Estonian Championship silver medals. Eurobasket.com voted him 2006–07 Baltic Basketball League Player of the Year. Also was first team all league in Australian league.

== Honours ==
=== Club ===
(Netherlands) Hanzevast Capitals

- Dutch Basketball League: 2003–04
- NBB Cup: 2004–05

(Estonia) BC Kalev/Cramo

- Estonian Basketball Cup (2): 2006–07, 2007–08
- Korvpalli Meistriliiga: 2009–10

=== Individual ===
(Netherlands) EBBC Den Bosch

- DBL Statistical Player of the Year: 2002–03

(Netherlands) Hanzevast Capitals

- DBL Most Valuable Player: 2003–04
- DBL All-Star (3): 2004, 2005, 2006
- DBL All-Star Game MVP: 2004

(Estonia) BC Kalev/Cramo

- Baltic Basketball League Season MVP: 2006–07
- Korvpalli Meistriliiga Season MVP: 2006–07
