= Otis Loyd =

American basketball player and coach

Otis Loyd (1950 – 2022) was an American basketball coach and professional basketball player.

== Career ==
A Brooklyn native, Loyd played basketball at the City College of New York. He started his professional career in 1974 in Helsingborg, Sweden, where he played for local club IFK. He spent two years there, then moved to Lugi Basketbollklubb in Lund, Sweden, for one year. Loyd returned to Helsingborg for another year and then went back to the United States to finish his college degree. During the 1979–80 season he played in Sweden again, this time with Malbas BBK in the city of Malmö. In 1980–81, he served as Malbas' player-coach.

Loyd joined BMS Skovlunde of Denmark for the 1981–82 season, where he served as player-coach, while at the same time coaching the women's team. With the men's team, he competed in the European Cup Winners' Cup in 1981–82: In the first round, he helped BMS defeat Sandvika BBK of Norway, scoring a total of 55 points in two games. In the next round, BMS took on Spanish powerhouse Real Madrid. In the first game against Madrid, which BMS Skovlunde lost 84:135, Loyd led his team with 21 points and had 17 in the second game (65:132). In 1982, he won the Danish championship with BMS. In the 1982–83 season, he played with BMS in the European Champions’ Cup and was eliminated in the first round by CSKA Moscow. Loyd left BMS Skovlunde in 1984 to join another team in Denmark, Virum Basketball Klub, as a player-coach. He later coached the women's team SISU in the Danish town of Gentofte and guided SISU to the Danish championship title in 1988.

In 1988, Loyd returned to BMS as a player, then had a stint as player-coach at Værløse BBK, Denmark, and in 1989 he moved to Allerød, Denmark, where he took over as coach at ALBA Basket. However, Loyd also continued his duty at Værløse at the same time, participating with the team in the 1989–90 Korać Cup and winning the Danish Cup competition with the team as a player-coach in 1992.

For the 1992–93 season, Loyd went back to Sweden to coach Malbas BBK. In 2000–2001, Loyd was part of the coaching staff of the Magic Great Danes, which had Magic Johnson on their roster, and competed in the North European Basketball League (NEBL). For the 2001–2002 season, Loyd again took over the coaching job at Værløse, but was released in December 2001. From 2002, Loyd worked in Virum as a youth coach. For the Danish Basketball Federation, Loyd served as national coach from 2001. Under coach Charles Barton, he served as assistant coach of the Danish men's national team in the early 2000s. Loyd was also the sporting director of the Danish Basketball Federation.

In the 2003–04 season, Loyd worked as a coach at Bergen op Zoom in the Netherlands. In 2005, he went back to Malbas BBK, Sweden, as sporting director and coach of the club's men's team. He later worked for BMS again and was involved in youth development at the Danish club. In 2012, Loyd returned to ALBA Basket in Allerød, Denmark, as a coach. Loyd was named assistant coach for Danish Basketliga side Wolfpack Copenhagen in 2016. His daughter Kalis played college basketball at Lamar University, before embarking on a professional career in Europe. She also became a member of the Swedish national team.

Loyd died in August 2022.
