= Topsportcentrum (Almere) =

Sports arena in Almere, Netherlands

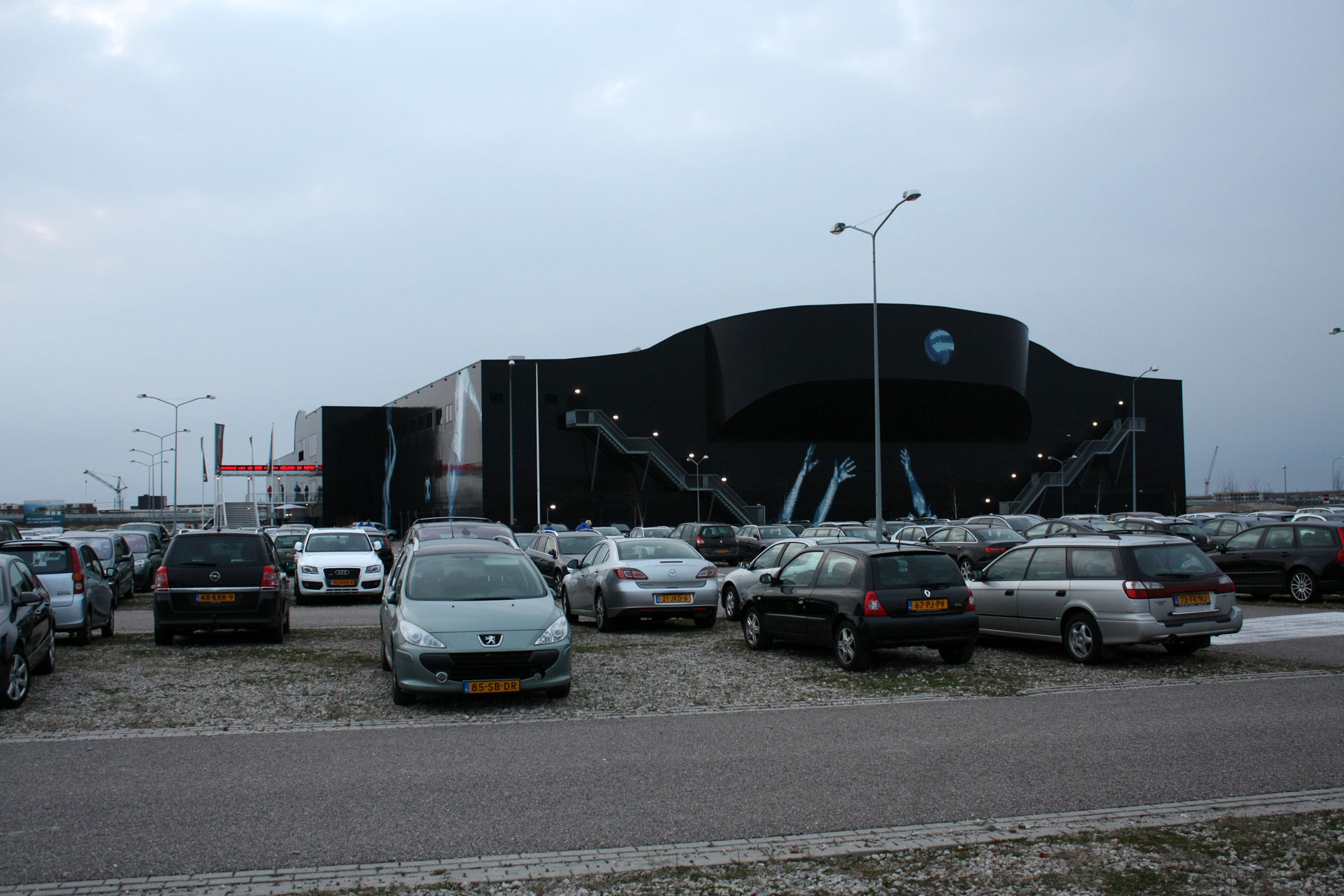
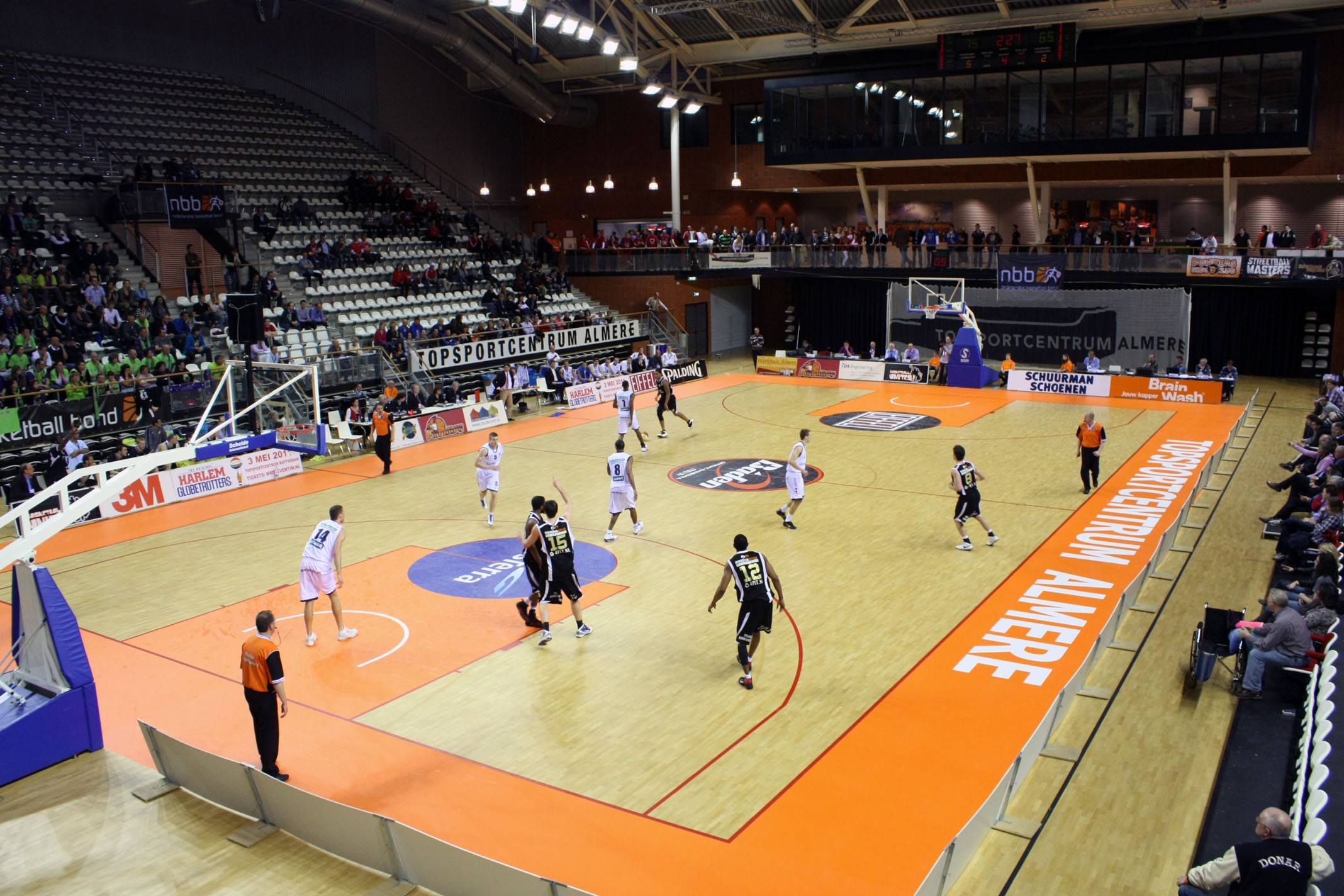
- Interactive map of Topsportcentrum
- Location: Almere, Netherlands
- Coordinates: 52°20′29″N 5°09′36″E
- Owner: City of Almere
- Operator: Sportbedrijf Almere
- Capacity: 3,000 (Volleyball, Basketball)

Construction
- Groundbreaking: 2005
- Built: 2007
- Opened: 7 October 2007
- Cost: €14 million

Tenants
- VC Allvo (Volleyball) (2007–present); Almere Sailors (Basketball) (2020–2021); Almere Pioneers (Basketball) (2007–present)

The Topsportcentrum is an indoor sports arena, located in Almere, Netherlands. Designed by architectural studio ZJA, it opened on the 7th of October in 2007. Its operator is the city of Almere and its main hall has a capacity of 3,000 people. The sports it is used most for are volleyball and basketball, with VC Allvo and Almere Pioneers using the venue as their home arena.

The hall was finished in 2007 and costed €14 million. From 2007 until 2013, the hall was used for the final of the NBB Cup, the main cup competition for men's basketball teams.

On 24 February 2020, Basketball Nederland announced the national basketball team will play its international home games in Almere until 2023.

== Sporting events ==
- 2007: NBB Cup Final
- 2008: NBB Cup Final
- 2009: NBB Cup Final
- 2010: NBB Cup Final
- 2011: NBB Cup Final
- 2012: NBB Cup Final
- 2013: NBB Cup Final
- 2014: Superkombat World Grand Prix IV 2014
- 2021: EuroHockey Indoor Club Cup
- 2024: Wheel Gymnastics World Championships
