= Chip Jones =

Dutch basketball player (born 1979)

Daniel Chip Jones
Personal information
- Born: 5 December 1979 (age 46) Tegelen, Netherlands
- Listed height: 2.00 m (6 ft 7 in)

Career information
- Playing career: 1999–2013
- Position: Small forward / power forward
- Number: 13

Career history
- 1999–2000: Den Helder
- 2000–2001: Virtus Werkendam
- 2001–2006: Den Bosch
- 2006–2008: West-Brabant Giants
- 2008–2013: Rotterdam

Career highlights
- 3x DBL All-Star (2004–2005, 2010)

Daniel "Chip" Jones (born 5 December 1979) is a Dutch retired basketball player. He played in 41 games for the Netherlands national basketball team after making his debut on 19 November 2000. Jones played for Dutch Basketball League teams Den Bosch, Den Helder, West-Brabant Giants, Rotterdam Basketbal College and Virtus Werkendam in his career.
