= 2004–05 Eredivisie (basketball) =

- League: Eredivisie
- Sport: Basketball

Regular season
- Top seed: MPC Capitals
- Season MVP: (United States) Leon Rodgers (EiffelTowers Den Bosch)
- Top scorer: (United States) Brandon Woudstra (23.3) (Woon! Aris)

Playoffs
- Playoffs MVP: (United States) Joe Spinks (Demon Astronauts)

Finals
- Champions: Demon Astronauts
- Runners-up: Landstede Basketbal

Dutch Basketball League seasons
- ← 2003–04 2005–06 →

The 2004–05 Eredivisie season was the 45th season of the Eredivisie in basketball, the highest professional basketball league in the Netherlands. Demon Astronauts from Amsterdam won their 5th national title.

== Regular season ==
1. MPC Capitals
2. Demon Astronauts
3. EiffelTowers Nijmegen
4. Tulip Den Bosch
5. Landstede Basketbal
6. BC Noordkop
7. Woon! Aris
8. Myleasecar.nl Giants
9. Rotterdam Basketbal
10. BS Weert
11. BC Omniworld Almere

== Playoffs ==
Quarterfinals
1	MPC Capitals	0
8	Myleasecar.nl Giants	2
4	Tulip Den Bosch	1
5	Landstede Basketbal	2
2	Demon Astronauts	2
7	BV Noordkop	0
3	EiffelTowers Nijmegen	2
6	Woon! Aris	0

Semifinals
8	Myleasecar.nl Giants	2
5	Landstede Basketbal	3
2	Demon Astronauts	3
3	EiffelTowers Nijmegen	1

Finals
5	Landstede Basketbal	0
2	Demon Astronauts	4
