= 2014–15 Dutch Basketball League =

Dutch Basketball League
- Season: 2014–15
- Duration: 10 October 2014 – 28 May 2015
- Games played: 32
- Teams: 9

Regular season
- Top seed: SPM Shoeters Den Bosch
- Season MVP: (United States) Lance Jeter

Finals
- Champions: SPM Shoeters Den Bosch (16th title)
- Runners-up: Donar
- Semi-finalists: ZZ Leiden; Landstede Zwolle
- Playoffs MVP: (United States) Brandyn Curry

Statistical leaders
Points	(Netherlands) Yannick Franke	19.6
Rebounds	(United States) Kenneth van Kempen	11.0
Assists	(United States) Lance Jeter	5.0
Index Rating	(United States) Joe Burton	23.5
- All statistics correct as of 7 September 2014.

The 2014–15 season was the 55th season of the Dutch Basketball League, the highest professional basketball league in the Netherlands. The defending champion was Donar from Groningen.

The league started the season with nine teams, after Matrixx Magixx did not enter. In December the number of teams was reduced to eight, after Den Helder Kings went bankrupt.

Top seeded SPM Shoeters won the league, by beating Donar 4–1 in the Finals.

== Teams ==
Location of teams in 2014–15 Dutch Basketball League

Before the season Matrixx Magixx announced it was withdrawing from the DBL, because the club could not complete its budget. Consequently, the league started with nine teams instead of ten. In December 2014, Port of Den Helder Kings left as well following its bankruptcy.

Colors	Club	City	Arena	Capacity	Head coach	Main sponsor	Kit manufacturer
	Apollo Amsterdam	Amsterdam	Apollohal	1,500	(Estonia) Jaanus Liivak	–	Peak
	~~Port of Den Helder Kings~~ ^{1}	Den Helder	KingsDome	1,500	(Belgium) Jean-Marc Jaumin	Port of Den Helder	Macron
	SPM Shoeters Den Bosch	's-Hertogenbosch	Maaspoort	2,800	(Netherlands) Sam Jones	SPM Shoes & Boots	Joma
	Donar	Groningen	MartiniPlaza	4,310	(Croatia) Ivica Skelin	–	Kix
	Challenge Sports Rotterdam	Rotterdam	Topsportcentrum	1,000	(Netherlands) Armand Salomon	Challenge Sports	Kelme
	Aris Leeuwarden	Leeuwarden	Sporthal Kalverdijkje	1,700	(Netherlands) Tom Simpson	Univé	Jako
	Zorg en Zekerheid Leiden	Leiden	Vijf Meihal	2,000	(Belgium) Eddy Casteels	Zorg en Zekerheid	Panzari Sports
	BSW ^{2}	Weert	Sporthal Boshoven		(Netherlands) Niels Vorenhout	Maxxcom	Spalding
	Landstede Basketbal	Zwolle	Landstede Sportcentrum	1,200	(Netherlands) Herman van den Belt	Landstede	Hummel

Notes
^1 Den Helder Kings was declared bankrupt and all records of the team were expunged on 15 December 2014.
^2 Till 1 January 2015, BSW was known as "Maxxcom BSW" for sponsorship reasons.

== Regular season ==
=== Standings ===
Pos	Team	Pld	W	L	PF	PA	PD	Pts	Qualification
1	SPM Shoeters Den Bosch	28	24	4	2374	1884	+490	48	Qualification to semifinals
2	ZZ Leiden	28	22	6	2418	2006	+412	44	Qualification to semifinals
3	Donar	28	21	7	2225	1903	+322	42	Qualification to quarterfinals
4	Landstede	28	20	8	2322	1999	+323	40	Qualification to quarterfinals
5	Challenge Sports Rotterdam	28	8	20	2204	2426	−222	16 (Note: Challenge Sports Rotterdam won head-to-head 2–2 (+40) vs Aris Leeuwarden.)	Qualification to quarterfinals
6	Aris Leeuwarden	28	8	20	2202	2464	−262	16	Qualification to quarterfinals
7	Apollo Amsterdam	28	5	23	1880	2297	−417	10	
8	BSW	28	4	24	1765	2322	−557	8	
9	Port of Den Helder Kings (D)	0	0	0	0	0	0	0	Expelled

Source: Dutch Basketball League, Scoresway
(D) Disqualified

=== Results ===
	AMS	DBO	GRO	LEE	ROT	LEI	WEE	ZWO
Apollo Amsterdam		52–88	56–85	76–82	66–90	75–87	61–64	46–77
Apollo Amsterdam		70–92	60–77	82–62	87–80	73–76	82–62	58–72
SPM Shoeters Den Bosch	111–60		76–59	93–66	81–59	82–77	95–57	79–56
SPM Shoeters Den Bosch	87–57		84–79	108–80	108–65	91–78	80–61	70–92
Donar Groningen	79–55	78–67		86–54	85–75	70–72	92–62	74–78
Donar Groningen	74–55	69–63		80–56	93–77	70–65	92–50	68–78
Aris Leeuwarden	89–97	72–94	92–86		91–92	81–101	73–61	79–87
Aris Leeuwarden	97–91	75–89	79–97		87–73	76–89	91–85	77–83
Challenge Sports Rotterdam	96–70	65–90	52–70	110–85		73–86	93–81	88–92
Challenge Sports Rotterdam	72–68	74–95	78–104	74–75		72–109	84–58	58–89
Zorg en Zekerheid Leiden	95–66	66–67	72–81	113–81	97–89		102–55	76–54
Zorg en Zekerheid Leiden	97–61	65–69	76–72	94–83	107–76		85–45	93–80
BS Weert	75–64	56–88	53–71	65–94	81–83	59–73		56–84
BS Weert	69–80	49–80	64–67	86–75	83–82	53–99		62–83
Landstede Zwolle	77–74	82–81	73–84	89–77	94–89	79–86	85–59	
Landstede Zwolle	68–66	65–66	81–83	84–56	94–85	73–82	84–54	

== Playoffs ==
Because the number of teams in the DBL decreased to nine, a new play-off format was chosen. After the seeds 3–6 played a best-of-three series in the quarter-finals, the semi-finals and finals would be played in a best-of-seven format.

Quarter-finals
4 Landstede	105	81
5 Challenge Sports Rotterdam	62	73
3 Donar	101	87
6 Aris Leeuwarden	66	73

Semi-finals
1 SPM Shoeters	85	66	74	86	82	68	87
4 Landstede	70	87	88	73	63	78	77
2 ZZ Leiden	86	63	69	59	85	71
3 Donar	80	78	79	63	56	77

Final
1 SPM Shoeters	93	70	80	62	85
3 Donar	54	61	72	67	64

== Awards ==
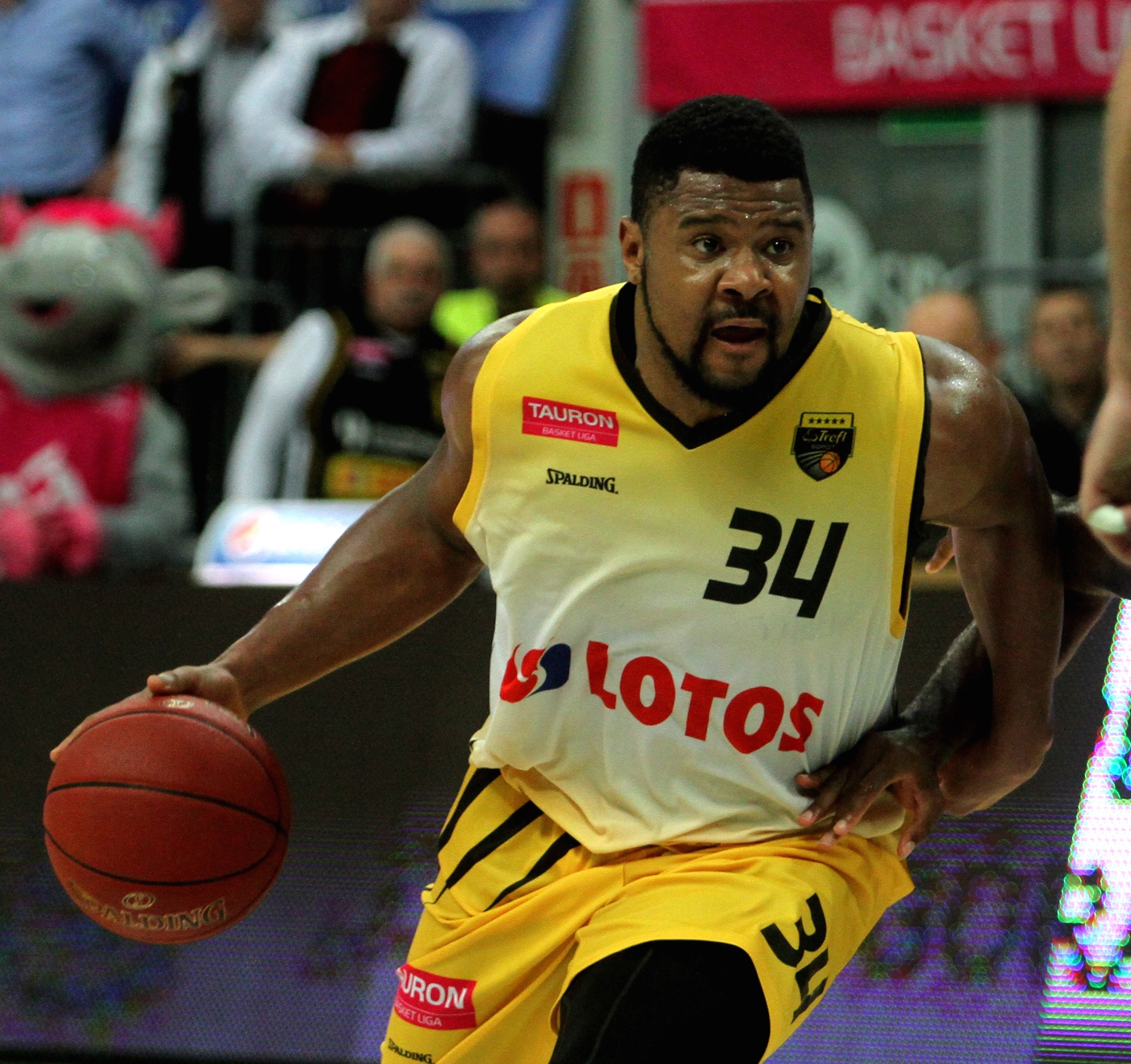
Lance Jeter was named league MVP

Award	Player	Team
Most Valuable Player	(United States) Lance Jeter	Donar
Playoffs MVP	(United States) Brandyn Curry	SPM Shoeters Den Bosch
Statistical Player of the Year	(United States) Joe Burton	Landstede Basketbal
Defensive Player of the Year	(Netherlands) (Morocco) Mohamed Kherrazi	Zorg en Zekerheid Leiden
Coach of the Year	(Croatia) Ivica Skelin	Donar
MVP U23	(Netherlands) Yannick Franke	Challenge Sports Rotterdam
Most Improved Player	(Netherlands) Yannick Franke	Challenge Sports Rotterdam
Sixth Man of the Year	(United States) Dylon Cormier	Zorg en Zekerheid Leiden
Rookie of the Year	(Netherlands) Daan Rosenmuller	BSW

All-Star Team
(United States) Lance Jeter	Donar
(United States) Brandyn Curry	SPM Shoeters Den Bosch
(Netherlands) Worthy de Jong	Zorg en Zekerheid Leiden
(United States) Mark Sanchez	Donar
(United States) Joe Burton	Landstede Basketbal

All-Rookie Team
(United Kingdom) (Netherlands) Nigel Van Oostrum	Aris Leeuwarden
(Netherlands) Mick Fleuren	BSW
(Netherlands) Daan Rosenmuller	BSW
(Netherlands) Nigel Onuoha	Challenge Sports Rotterdam
(Netherlands) Jan Driessen	Zorg en Zekerheid Leiden

All-Defense Team
(United States) J.T. Tiller	Landstede Basketbal
(Netherlands) Worthy de Jong	Zorg en Zekerheid Leiden
(Netherlands) (Morocco) Mohamed Kherrazi	Zorg en Zekerheid Leiden
(Netherlands) Stefan Wessels	SPM Shoeters Den Bosch
(United States) Joe Burton	Landstede Basketbal

== Individual statistics ==
=== Points ===
Rank	Name	Team	PPG
1	(Netherlands) Yannick Franke	Challenge Sports Rotterdam	19.64
2	(United States) Marquise Simmons	Aris Leeuwarden	16.30
3	(United States) Lance Jeter	Donar	15.80

=== Rebounds ===
Rank	Name	Team	RPG
1	(Netherlands) Kenneth van Kempen	BSW	11.00
2	(United States) Ryan Watkins	Aris Leeuwarden	10.15
3	(United States) Marquise Simmons	Aris Leeuwarden	8.04

=== Assists ===
Rank	Name	Team	APG
1	(United States) Lance Jeter	Donar	4.96
2	(United States) Brandyn Curry	SPM Shoeters	4.92
3	(Netherlands) Rogier Jansen	ZZ Leiden	4.85

== Notable occurrences ==
- On May 29, 2014, health insurance company Zorg en Zekerheid extended its sponsorship contract with ZZ Leiden for three more years.
- On May 13, 2014, it was announced ZZ Leiden and head coach Toon van Helfteren, who won six trophies with the club, would part ways. On May 30, the Belgian Eddy Casteels coach was hired as new head coach.
- On June 6, 2014, Matrixx Magixx announced the club was close to bankruptcy after having difficulties in finding a new main sponsor to replace The Magixx.

On July 21, 2014, Magixx announced it would withdraw its participation for this season, after they couldn't reach a high enough budget.

- On September 29, 2014, the first game ever of the Dutch Talent League (DTL) was played. This league was the newly formed development league of the DBL, mainly made for players under age 25.
- On August 9, 2014, Apollo Amsterdam announced that it would play in the DBL after working a long time to reach the DBL budget standard. This would mean the return of a team from Amsterdam since the departure of ABC in 2010.
- On August 16, 2014, GasTerra Flames announced it would be named "Donar" again.
- On August 29, 2014, the DBL announced for the season a new play-off system would be used. Six teams would qualify this season, compared to eight last year. In the quarter-finals, the first and second seeds received byes.
- On December 2, 2014, Den Helder Kings was declared bankrupt. Consequently, the club was expelled from the DBL.

== In European competitions ==
Club	Competition	Result	W–L	Ref
SPM Shoeters Den Bosch	EuroChallenge	Last 16	4–8	
