= 2013–14 Dutch Basketball League =

Dutch Basketball League
- Season: 2013–14
- Duration: 5 October 2013 – 1 June 2014
- Games played: 36
- Teams: 10

Regular season
- Top seed: GasTerra Flames
- Season MVP: (Netherlands) Arvin Slagter

Finals
- Champions: GasTerra Flames (4th title)
- Runners-up: SPM Shoeters Den Bosch
- Semifinalists: Port of Den Helder Kings; ZZ Leiden
- Playoffs MVP: (Netherlands) Arvin Slagter

Statistical leaders
Points	(United States) Darius Theus	16.9
Rebounds	(Netherlands) Kenneth van Kempen	8.9
Assists	(Puerto Rico) Emmanuel Ubilla	5.6
Index Rating	(United States) Darius Theus	19.5
- All statistics correct as of 7 September 2014.

The 2013–14 Dutch Basketball League season was the 54th season of the Dutch Basketball League, the highest professional basketball league in the Netherlands. The defending champion is Zorg en Zekerheid Leiden. GasTerra Flames from Groningen won their 4th title by beating SPM Shoeters Den Bosch 4–3 in the Finals.

== Teams ==
All teams from the 2012-13 season returned. The club EiffelTowers Den Bosch changed its name to SPM Shoeters Den Bosch after their new sponsor SPM Shoes & Boots and Stepco BSW became Maxxcom BSW. During the season Rotterdam Basketbal College changed its name in Challenge Sports Rotterdam after Challenge Sports became their new main sponsor.

Colors	Club	City	Arena	Capacity	DBL season	2012–13
	Apollo	Amsterdam	Apollohal	1,500	2	9th
	Den Helder Kings (Note: Den Helder played the Playoffs with Port of Den Helder Kings as their official name.)	Den Helder	Sporthal Sportcenter	1,500	26	6th
	SPM Shoeters Den Bosch	's-Hertogenbosch	Maaspoort	2,800	42	1st
	GasTerra Flames	Groningen	Martiniplaza	4,300	42	3rd
	Challenge Sports Rotterdam (Note: Started the season as Rotterdam Basketbal College.)	Rotterdam	Topsportcentrum	1,000	24	10th
	Aris Leeuwarden	Leeuwarden	Sporthal Kalverdijkje	1,700	10	4th
	Zorg en Zekerheid Leiden	Leiden	Vijf Meihal	2,000	27	2nd
	Maxxcom BSW	Weert	Sporthal Boshoven		32	8th
	Matrixx Magixx	Wijchen	Sporthal De Arcus	700	14	7th
	Landstede Basketbal	Zwolle	Landstede Sportcentrum	1,200	27	5th

Key to colors
Champion
Runner-up
Semifinalist
Quarterfinalist

== Regular season ==
=== Standings ===
Pos	Team	Pld	W	L	PF	PA	PD	Pts	Qualification or relegation
1	GasTerra Flames	36	32	4	2759	2141	+618	64	Qualification for playoffs
2	SPM Shoeters Den Bosch	36	29	7	2865	2382	+483	58	Qualification for playoffs
3	Den Helder Kings	36	24	12	199	150	+49	48	Qualification for playoffs
4	ZZ Leiden	36	22	14	2732	2512	+220	44 (Note: ZZ Leiden won 3–1 head-to-head vs Landstede.)	Qualification for playoffs
5	Landstede	36	22	14	2807	2559	+248	44	Qualification for playoffs
6	Matrixx Magixx	36	20	16	249	249	0	40	Qualification for playoffs
7	Aris Leeuwarden	36	13	23	2759	2996	−237	26	Qualification for playoffs
8	Apollo Amsterdam	36	7	29	2144	2702	−558	14 (Note: Apollo Amsterdam won 3–1 head-to-head vs Challenge Sports Rotterdam.)	Qualification for playoffs
9	Challenge Sports Rotterdam	36	7	29	2323	2850	−527	14	
10	Maxxcom BSW	36	4	32	2323	2850	−527	8	

Source: DBL

=== Positions by round ===
Team \ Round	1	2	3	4	5	6	7	8	9	10	11	12	13	14	15	16	17	18	19	20	21	22	23	24	25	26	27	28	29	30	31	32	33
GasTerra Flames	6	8	3	3	1	3	2	2	2	2	2	1	1	1	1	1	1	1	1	1	1	1	1	1	1	1	1	1	1	1	1	1	1
SPM Shoeters Den Bosch	1	2	1	2	3	2	4	4	5	5	3	3	3	3	3	3	2	2	2	2	2	2	2	2	2	2	2	2	2	2	2	2	2
Den Helder Kings	4	3	5	6	7	8	8	7	6	6	6	6	6	5	4	4	4	4	3	3	3	3	3	3	3	3	3	3	3	3	3	3	3
Zorg en Zekerheid Leiden	5	4	6	7	6	5	5	5	4	4	5	5	4	6	5	6	6	6	6	6	6	6	6	6	5	5	6	6	6	5	5	5	4
Landstede	3	1	2	1	2	1	1	1	1	1	1	2	2	2	2	2	3	3	4	4	4	4	4	4	4	4	4	4	4	4	4	4	5
Matrixx Magixx	8	5	7	5	4	4	3	3	3	3	4	4	5	4	6	5	5	5	5	5	5	5	5	5	6	6	5	5	5	6	6	6	6
Aris Leeuwarden	2	6	4	4	5	7	7	8	8	8	8	8	8	8	8	8	8	7	7	7	7	7	7	7	7	7	7	7	7	7	7	7	7
Apollo Amsterdam	9	10	10	10	10	9	9	9	9	9	9	9	9	9	9	9	9	9	9	9	9	9	9	9	9	9	8	8	8	9	9	9	8
Challenge Sports Rotterdam	7	7	8	8	8	6	6	6	7	7	7	7	7	7	7	7	7	8	8	8	8	8	8	8	8	8	9	9	9	8	8	8	9
Maxxcom BSW	10	9	9	9	9	10	10	10	10	10	10	10	10	10	10	10	10	10	10	10	10	10	10	10	10	10	10	10	10	10	10	10	10

Top seed
Advance to playoffs

=== Results ===
Team	AMS	DBO	DHE	GRO	LEE	LEI	ROT	WEE	WIJ	ZWO
AMS		59–74; 43–67	75–82; 56–63	54–71; 43–71	59–72; 67–79	50–60; 58–87	77–56; 60–58	67–58; 84–71	60–78; 43–73	60–74; 67–88
DBO	94–49; 69–50		65–66; 99–76	51–75; 64–77	90–73; 104–75	78–67; 80–68	85–63; 89–67	74–59; 96–64	86–69; 76–66	80–72; 81–65
DHE	91–69; 80–59	85–74; 76–99		65–75; 68–86	80–70; 85–52	77–69; 75–65	87–51; 77–58	82–70; 94–55	65–73; 95–62	84–87; 90–81
GRO	81–45; 78–47	52–68; 85–69	79–70; 78–67		91– 57; 81–75	70–61; 90–57	78–41; 79–50	81–44; 97–46	85–79; 71–69	83–62; 80–78
LEE	80–70; 68–84	70–79; 72–82	94–77; 66–87	77–75; 64–81		78–94; 83–71	97–98; 85–64	88–67; 80–70	70–83; 90–96	60–86; 88–78
LEI	76–64; 77–49	69–78; 83–86	72–68; 82–52	69–63; 63–75	84–66; 80–68		80–73; 88–65	66–59; 81–51	65–74; 87–73	76–73; 79–75
ROT	61–58; 64–74	52–74; 55–83	76–82; 62–78	59–65; 57–80	113–105; 96–95	75–84; 51–84		78–57; 71–76	67–65; 46–79	70–95; 58–69
WEE	59–60; 62–60	54–90; 47–93	74–85; 78–84	49–72; 38–79	90–91; 81–82	53–104; 72–91	59–65; 59–53		60–90; 60–79	56–85; 59–57
WIJ	99–53; 87–58	76–64; 66–83	78–91; 79–84	60–63; 50–72	104–71; 76–78	75–73; 85–84	89–65; 91–55	99–67; 76–48		68–75; 85–69
ZWO	94–43; 99–70	77–75; 65–78	70–88; 82–80	72–66; 55–72	82–75; 90–65	72–59; 75–78	71–64; 99–65	82–52; 89–66	89–68; 75–71	

== Playoffs ==
Quarterfinals
1	GasTerra Flames	2
8	Apollo Amsterdam	0
4	ZZ Leiden	2
5	Landstede	1
2	SPM Shoeters Den Bosch	2
7	Aris Leeuwarden	0
3	Port of Den Helder Kings	2
6	Matrixx Magixx	0

Semifinals
1	GasTerra Flames	3
4	ZZ Leiden	2
2	SPM Shoeters Den Bosch	3
3	Port of Den Helder Kings	0

Finals
1	GasTerra Flames	4
2	SPM Shoeters Den Bosch	3

== All-Star Gala ==
See 2014 DBL All-Star Gala

== Awards ==
Four new awards were handed out this season, in the Playoffs MVP, Sixth Man of the Year award and the All-Defense and All-Rookie Teams.

- Most Valuable Player: (Netherlands) Arvin Slagter (GasTerra Flames)
- Playoffs MVP: (Netherlands) Arvin Slagter (GasTerra Flames)
- MVP Under 23: (Netherlands) Leon Williams (Landstede Basketbal)
- Statistical Player of the Year: (United States) Darius Theus (Aris Leeuwarden)
- Coach of the Year: (Croatia) Ivica Skelin (GasTerra Flames)
- Rookie of the Year: (Australia) Joshua Duinker (Zorg en Zekerheid Leiden)
- Most Improved Player: (Netherlands) Jeroen van der List (Den Helder Kings)
- Defensive Player of the Year: (United States) Jason Dourisseau (GasTerra Flames)
- Sixth Man of the Year: (United States) Ali Farokhmanesh (SPM Shoeters Den Bosch)

- All-Star Team:
  - (United States) Cashmere Wright (GasTerra Flames)
  - (Netherlands) Arvin Slagter (GasTerra Flames)
  - (United States) Patrick Richard (Matrixx Magixx)
  - (Australia) Joshua Duinker (Zorg en Zekerheid Leiden)
  - (United States) Tai Wesley (SPM Shoeters Den Bosch)
- All-Defense Team:
  - (United States) Darius Theus (Aris Leeuwarden)
  - (Netherlands) Arvin Slagter (GasTerra Flames)
  - (United States) Jason Dourisseau (GasTerra Flames)
  - (Netherlands) Stefan Wessels (SPM Shoeters Den Bosch)
  - (Canada) Ross Bekkering (GasTerra Flames)
- All-Rookie Team
  - (Netherlands) Yannick Franke (Challenge Sports Rotterdam)
  - (United States) Tom Snikkers (Aris Leeuwarden)
  - (Russia) Roman Grigoryev (Maxxcom BSW)
  - (Australia) Joshua Duinker (Zorg en Zekerheid Leiden)
  - (Netherlands) Lucas Steijn (BC Apollo)

== Statistical leaders ==
Only players who played more than 29 games qualified. For the two point percentage ranking, a player had to take at least 5 shots per game, for the three point and free throw ranking 3 shots per game.

Category	Player	Team	Average
Points	(United States) Darius Theus	Aris Leeuwarden	16.9
Rebounds	(Netherlands) Kenneth van Kempen	Maxxcom BSW	8.9
Assists	(Puerto Rico) Emmanuel Ubilla	Den Helder Kings	5.6
Steals	(United States) Darius Theus	Aris Leeuwarden	3.1
Blocks	(Netherlands) Berend Weijs	Apollo Amsterdam	2.0
2P%	(United States) Darius Theus	Aris Leeuwarden	.637
3P%	(Netherlands) Arvin Slagter	GasTerra Flames	.500
FT%	(Netherlands) Rogier Jansen	Den Helder Kings	.892

== In European competitions ==
Club	Competition	Result	W–L	Ref
SPM Shoeters Den Bosch	EuroChallenge	Regular season	3–3	
GasTerra Flames	EuroChallenge	Regular season	2–4	
ZZ Leiden	EuroChallenge	Regular season	2–4	
Overall			7–11	
