= 2008–09 Eredivisie (basketball) =

Eredivisie
- Season: 2008–09
- Dates: September 2008 – 31 May 2009
- Teams: 11

Regular season
- Season MVP: Peter van Paassen

Finals
- Champions: MyGuide Amsterdam (7th title)
- Runners-up: EiffelTowers Den Bosch

Statistical leaders
Points	Matt Bauscher	22.0
Rebounds	Aaron Johnson	10.6
Assists	Matt Bauscher	5.9

The 2008–09 Eredivisie season was the 48th season of the Eredivisie in basketball, which is the premier professional basketball league in the Netherlands. MyGuide Amsterdam won their 7th national title on 31 May 2009 by defeating EiffelTowers Den Bosch in Game 7 of the finals.

== Regular season ==
Pos.	Team	GP	W	L	Pnt
1	EclipseJet-MyGuide Amsterdam	40	35	5	70
2	EiffelTowers Den Bosch	40	28	12	56
3	Hanzevast Capitals	40	26	14	52
4	Matrixx Magixx	40	24	16	48
5	West-Brabant Giants	40	24	16	48
6	Rotterdam Challengers	40	22	18	44
7	Upstairs! Weert	40	15	25	30
8	Zorg en Zekerheid Leiden	40	14	26	28
9	Landstede Basketbal	40	13	27	26
10	Aris Leeuwarden	40	12	28	24
11	BlueStream Seals	40	7	33	14

Qualified for playoffs

== Playoffs ==
Quarterfinals
1	My-Guide Amsterdam	2
8	Zorg en Zekerheid Leiden	0
4	West-Brabant Giants	2
5	Matrixx Magixx	0
2	EiffelTowers Den Bosch	2
7	Upstairs Weert	0
3	Hanzevast Capitals	2
6	Rotterdam Challengers	1

Semifinals
1	My-Guide Amsterdam	3
4	West-Brabant Giants	0
2	EiffelTowers Den Bosch	3
3	Hanzevast Capitals	2

Finals
1	My-Guide Amsterdam	4
2	EiffelTowers Den Bosch	3
