= Almere Pioneers =

- Leagues: Promotiedivisie
- Founded: 1999; 26 years ago
- History: BC Omniworld Almere; 1999–2009; Almere Pioneers; 2009–present
- Arena: Topsportcentrum
- Capacity: 3,000
- Location: Almere, Netherlands
- Team colors: Orange, Red, Purple
- Website: almerepioneers.nl
Home	Away

Almere Pioneers is a Dutch amateur basketball team based in Almere. The team plays in the Promotiedivisie, the Dutch second tier league.

== History ==
The club was founded in 1999 as a professional basketball club named BC Omniworld Almere and participated in the top-tier Eredivisie. The team played its home games in the Topsportcentrum Almere. The 2002–03 season was the best season in Almere's history, as the team reached the Eredivisie finals. In these finals Omniworld lost 0–4 to Amsterdam. In January 2008, the team went bankrupt and was forced to leave the Eredivisie.

A year later, the club changed its name to Almere Pioneers and started playing in the second-tier amateur league Promotiedivisie. In 2013, Pioneers tried to make a comeback to the Eredivisie but failed due to a lack of budget. In 2020, Almere Sailors was established by the Pioneers board. This separate professional club now plays at the highest level of Dutch basketball.

== Season by season ==
Season	Tier	League	Pos.	NBB Cup
BC Omniworld
1998–99	1	DBL	10th	
1999–00	1	DBL	9th	
2000–01	1	DBL	5th	
2001–02	1	DBL	5th	
2002–03	1	DBL	2nd	
2003–04	1	DBL	6th	–
2004–05	1	DBL	11th	
2005–06	1	DBL	7th	
2006–07	1	DBL	11th	
Almere Pioneers
2007–	Lower divisions			

== Notable players ==
Note: Flags indicate national team eligibility at FIBA-sanctioned events. Players may hold other non-FIBA nationalities not displayed.

Criteria

To appear in this section a player must have either:

- Set a club record or won an individual award while at the club
- Played at least one official international match for their national team at any time
- Played at least one official NBA match at any time.

- (United States) Ian Hanavan (2003–2004)
- (Netherlands) Rogier Jansen (2005–2006)
- (United States) John Turek (2005–2006)

== Head coaches ==
Name	Nationality	Tenure
Jan Willem Jansen	Netherlands	2000 – 2003
Marco van den Berg	Netherlands	2004 – 2008
