= DBL All-Defense Team =

The Dutch Basketball League (DBL) All-Defense Team is a team constituted by the best defensive players in a season of the Dutch Basketball League, the highest professional basketball league in the Netherlands. This team is based on players' performance throughout the regular season. After the end of the season, the best players of each position are chosen.

== List of All-Defense teams ==
Bold indicates the player who won the Defensive Player of the Year award in the same year (given from 2013 to 2021). Numbers in brackets denote how many time the player was named to the tea.

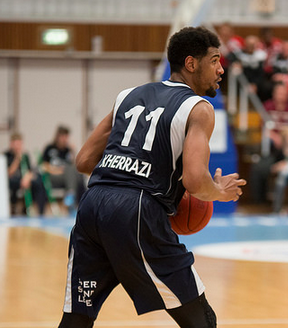
Mohamed Kherrazi has been selected five times as a player of ZZ Leiden

| Season | Player | Team |
|---|---|---|
| 1973–74 | Frank Kales | Flamingo's Haarlem |
| 1973–74 | Jan Dekker | Rotterdam-Zuid |
| 1973–74 | Jacky Dinkins | Rotterdam-Zuid |
| 1973–74 | Hank Smith | Flamingo's Haarlem |
| 1973–74 | Bob Heuts | Bona Stars Leiden |
| 1974–75 | Jacky Dinkins (2) | Rotterdam-Zuid |
| 1974–75 | Harry Rogers | Punch |
| 1974–75 | Toon van Helfteren | Punch |
| 1974–75 | Walter Ombre | Flamingo's Haarlem |
| 1974–75 | Hank Smith (2) | Canadians Amsterdam |
| 1975–76 | Hank Smith (3) | Canadians Amsterdam |
| 1975–76 | Steven Bravard | EBBC Den Bosch |
| 1975–76 | Charles Kirkland | Punch |
| 1975–76 | Jim Woudstra | Punch |
| 1975–76 | Craig Casault | Rotterdam-Zuid |
| 1976–77 | Jim Woudstra (2) | Punch |
| 1976–77 | Vic Bartolome | Leiden |
| 1976–77 | Steven Bravard (2) | EBBC Den Bosch |
| 1976–77 | Jimmy Moore | Arke Stars Enschede |
| 1976–77 | Pete Miller | Donar |
| 1977–78 | Renso Zwiers | Donar |
| 1977–78 | Jim Woudstra (3) | Punch |
| 1977–78 | Charles Kirkland (2) | EBBC Den Bosch |
| 1977–78 | Bill Mallory | BOB Oud-Beijerland |
| 1977–78 | Pete Miller (2) | Donar |
| 1978–79 | Renso Zwiers (2) | Donar |
| 1978–79 | Jim Woudstra (4) | Leiden |
| 1978–79 | Charles Kirkland (3) | EBBC Den Bosch |
| 1978–79 | Dan Cramer | EBBC Den Bosch |
| 1978–79 | James Lister | EBBC Den Bosch |
| 1979–80 | Renso Zwiers (3) | Donar |
| 1979–80 | Owen Wells | BV Amstelveen |
| 1979–80 | Charles Kirkland (4) | EBBC Den Bosch |
| 1979–80 | Toon van Helfteren (2) | Punch |
| 1979–80 | James Lister (2) | EBBC Den Bosch |
| 1980–81 | Dan Cramer (2) | EBBC Den Bosch |
| 1980–81 | Wilson Washington | BV Amstelveen |
| 1980–81 | Charles Kirkland (5) | EBBC Den Bosch |
| 1980–81 | Randy Wiel | BV Amstelveen |
| 1980–81 | Jim Woudstra (5) | Parker Leiden |
| 1981–82 | Dan Cramer (3) | EBBC Den Bosch |
| 1981–82 | Wilson Washington (2) | BV Amstelveen |
| 1981–82 | Charles Kirkland (6) | Flamingo's Haarlem |
| 1981–82 | Jimmy Moore (2) | Donar |
| 1981–82 | Mitchell Plaat | Parker Leiden |
| 2013–14 | Darius Theus | Aris Leeuwarden |
| 2013–14 | Arvin Slagter | Donar |
| 2013–14 | **Jason Dourisseau** | Donar |
| 2013–14 | Stefan Wessels | Den Bosch |
| 2013–14 | Ross Bekkering | Donar |
| 2014–15 | J.T. Tiller | Landstede Basketbal |
| 2014–15 | Worthy de Jong | ZZ Leiden |
| 2014–15 | **Mohamed Kherrazi** | ZZ Leiden |
| 2014–15 | Stefan Wessels (2) | Den Bosch |
| 2014–15 | Joe Burton | Landstede Basketbal |
| 2015–16 | Steve McWhorter | Landstede Zwolle |
| 2015–16 | Worthy de Jong (2) | ZZ Leiden |
| 2015–16 | **Mohamed Kherrazi** (2) | ZZ Leiden |
| 2015–16 | Stefan Wessels (3) | Den Bosch |
| 2015–16 | Ross Bekkering (2) | Donar |
| 2016–17 | Sean Cunningham | Donar |
| 2016–17 | J. T. Tiller | Landstede |
| 2016–17 | **Jason Dourisseau** (2) | Donar |
| 2016–17 | Mohamed Kherrazi (3) | ZZ Leiden |
| 2016–17 | Thomas Koenis | Donar |
| 2017–18 | **Sean Cunningham** (2) | Donar |
| 2017–18 | Carrington Love | ZZ Leiden |
| 2017–18 | Stefan Wessels (4) | New Heroes Den Bosch |
| 2017–18 | Mohamed Kherrazi (4) | ZZ Leiden |
| 2017–18 | Thomas Koenis (2) | Donar |
| 2018–19 | Darius Thompson | ZZ Leiden |
| 2018–19 | Worthy de Jong (3) | ZZ Leiden |
| 2018–19 | Kaza Kajami-Keane | Landstede |
| 2018–19 | **Mohamed Kherrazi** (5) | ZZ Leiden |
| 2018–19 | Berend Weijs | Apollo Amsterdam |
| 2020–21 | Leon Williams | Donar |
| 2020–21 | **Worthy de Jong** (4) | ZZ Leiden |
| 2020–21 | DeMario Mayfield | Heroes Den Bosch |
| 2020–21 | Juan Davis | Feyenoord |
| 2020–21 | Emmanuel Nzekwesi | ZZ Leiden |

== Selections by player ==
| Player | Total |
|---|---|
| Charles Kirkland | 6 |
| Mohamed Kherrazi | 5 |
| Jimmy Woudstra | 5 |
| Worthy de Jong | 4 |
| Stefan Wessels | 4 |
| Renso Zwiers | 3 |
