= 1976–77 Eredivisie (basketball) =

Eredivisie
- League: Eredivisie
- Sport: Basketball
- Number of teams: 10

Regular season
- Season champions: BV Amstelveen (2nd title)
- Season MVP: Jimmy Moore (Enschede)

Seasons
- ← 1975–76 1977–78 →

The 1976–77 Eredivisie was the 16th season of the highest-level basketball league in the Netherlands, and the 31st season of the top flight Dutch basketball competition.

BV Amstelveen won its second league title in a row.

== Regular season ==
Pos.	Club	Pld	W	L	Pts	PCT	PF	PA	Diff	Qualification or relegation
1	BV Amstelveen (C)	36	33	3	66	91,67	3620	3085	535	
2	EBBC Den Bosch	36	28	8	56	77,78	3370	3102	268	Qualification for 1977–78 FIBA European Cup Winners' Cup
3	Punch	36	27	9	54	75,00	3347	3120	227	
4	Donar	36	19	17	38	52,78	3053	3048	5	
5	Rotterdam-Zuid	36	18	18	36	50,00	3318	3318	0	
6	Haarlem	36	17	19	34	47,22	3357	3353	4	
7	Canadians Amsterdam	36	13	23	26	36,11	3001	3011	-10	
8	Arke Reizen Enschede	36	11	25	22	30,56	3078	3329	-251	
9	Markt Utrecht	36	8	28	16	22,22	3155	3587	-432	
10	Leiden	36	6	30	12	16,67	2920	3266	-346	

(C): Champions; Source: J-dus.com

== Individual awards ==
- Most Valuable Player: Jimmy Moore (Arke Stars Enschede)
- Coach of the Year: Bill Sheridan (EBBC Den Bosch)
- Rookie of the Year: Jos Wolfs (Buitoni Haarlem)
- First-team All-Eredivisie:
  - Bill Mallory (Markt Utrecht)
  - Joe Wallace (BV Amstelveen)
  - Jimmy Moore (Arke Stars Enschede)
  - Jimmy Woudstra (Punch Delft)
  - Harry Rogers (Punch Delft)
- All-Defensive Team:
  - Jimmy Woudstra (Punch Delft)
  - Vic Bartolome (Leiden)
  - Steven Bravard (Den Bosch)
  - Jimmy Moore (Arke Stars Enschede)
  - Pete Miller (Donar)
