= 1975–76 Eredivisie (basketball) =

15th season of Dutch basketball Eredivisie

Eredivisie
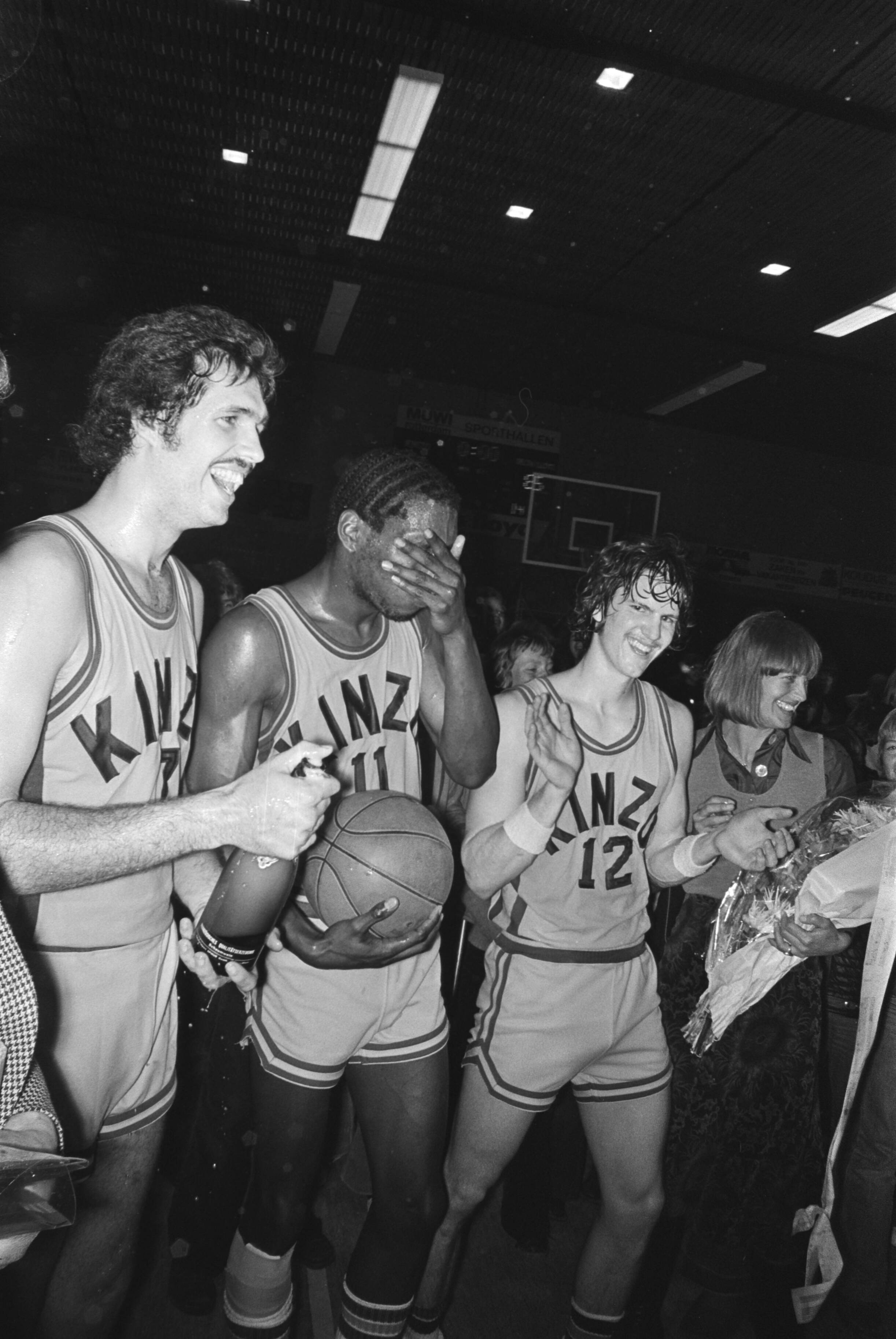
- Kino Amstelveen celebrating winning the league
- League: Eredivisie
- Sport: Basketball
- Number of teams: 10

Regular season
- Season champions: BV Amstelveen (1st title)
- Season MVP: Hank Smith (Delta Lloyd)

Eredivisie seasons
- ← 1974–75 1976–77 →

The 1975–76 Eredivisie was the 15th season of the highest-level basketball league in the Netherlands, and the 30th season of the top flight Dutch basketball competition.

BV Amstelveen (known as Kinzo Amstelveen for sponsorship reasons) won its first league title.

== Standings ==
Pos.	Club	Pld	W	L	Pts	PCT	PF	PA	Diff	Qualification or relegation
1	BV Amstelveen (C)	36	29	7	58	80,56	3303	2956	347	Qualification for FIBA European Champions Cup
2	Haarlem	36	26	10	52	72,22	3230	2805	425	Qualification for FIBA European Cup Winners' Cup
3	EBBC Den Bosch	36	24	12	48	66,67	3156	2920	236	
4	Punch	36	23	13	46	63,89	3108	2899	209	
5	Delta Lloyd Amsterdam	36	23	13	46	63,89	2886	2765	121	
6	Rotterdam-Zuid	36	21	15	42	58,33	2962	2806	156	
7	Donar	36	20	16	40	55,56	2925	2705	220	
8	Gerard de Lange Amsterdam	36	7	29	14	19,44	2683	3113	-430	
9	Arke Stars Enschede	36	4	32	8	11,11	2702	3296	-594	
10	Leiden	36	3	33	6	8,33	2460	3150	-690	

(C): Champions; Source: J-dus.com

== Individual awards ==
- Most Valuable Player: Hank Smith (Delta Lloyd Amsterdam)
- Coach of the Year: Tom Quinn (Flamingo's Haarlem)
- Rookie of the Year: Cock van de Lagemaat (Flamingo's Haarlem)
- First-team All-Eredivisie:
  - Owen Wells (BV Amstelveen)
  - Joe Wallace (BV Amstelveen)
  - Hank Smith (Delta Lloyd Amsterdam)
  - Steven Bravard (EBBC Den Bosch)
  - Gary Freeman (Flamingo's Haarlem)
- All-Defensive Team:
  - Hank Smith (Delta Lloyd Amsterdam)
  - Charles Kirkland (Punch Delft)
  - Steven Bravard (Den Bosch)
  - Jimmy Woudstra (Punch Delft)
  - Craig Casault (Rotterdam-Zuid)
