= Jimmy Woudstra =

Dutch basketball player

Jim Woudstra
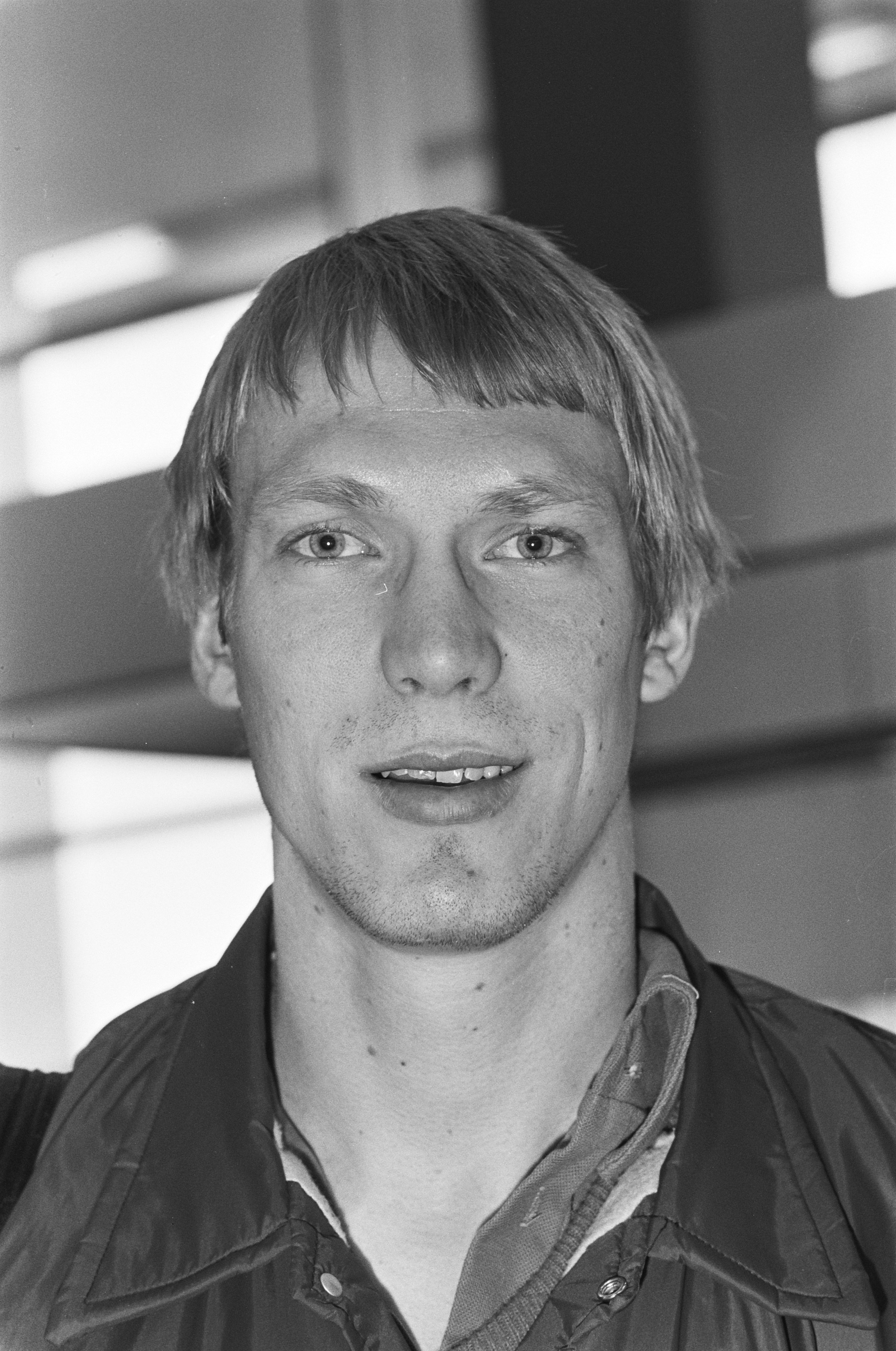
- Woudstra in 1980

Personal information
- Born: June 11, 1952 (age 74) Sioux County, Iowa
- Listed height: 2.01 m (6 ft 7 in)

Career information
- High school: Unity Christian HS (Orange City, Iowa)
- College: Northwestern
- Playing career: 1975–1981
- Position: Small forward

Career history
- 1976–1978: Punch Delft
- 1978–1981: Parker Leiden

Career highlights
- First-team All-Eredivisie (1977); 5× Eredivisie All-Defensive Team (1976–1979, 1981)

Jim "Jimmy" Woudstra (born June 22, 1952) is an American-Dutch former professional basketball player. He was a standout college player for the Northwestern Red Raiders, where he is the all-time scoring leader. Woudstra played six seasons of professional basketball in the Dutch Eredivisie, for Punch Delft and Parker Leiden. He also represented the Netherlands national team.

== Early life ==
Woudstra grew up in Orange City, Iowa. He attended Unity Christian High School, where he was named an Iowa All-State player in 1970. He also was active in athletics

== College career ==
Woudstra played for the Northwestern Red Raiders of the Northwestern College. He scored 2,368 points over his college career, and so Woudstra is the Red Raiders' all-time leader in points scored. He was named MVP in 1973 and 1974 and was named to the all-conference team four times. He was inducted into the Northwestern Hall of Fame in 1983.

== Professional career ==
In 1974, Woudstra received a letter from Theo Kinsbergen, who attended him on his Dutch heritage and invited him to play professionally in the Netherlands. He refused the offer and started working for the Christian High School in Denver. There, he met Dan Cramer who had already been playing in the Netherlands. The following year, he joined Punch Delft as he was recruited by coach Bill Sheridan. Woudstra averaged 18.3 points in his rookie season (1975–76).

In 1978, Woudstra moved to Parker Leiden after three years with Punch.

== National team career ==
After debuting in 1975, Woudstra played for the Netherlands national team and played with the team at EuroBasket 1977 and 1979. He averaged 16.7 points (1977) and 17.7 points (1979) per game.

Woudstra played 73 total games for the Netherlands.

== Personal ==
Woudstra lives in Colorado Springs, Colorado. He has a nephew, Brandon Woudstra, who also played professional basketball in the Netherlands.
