= 1977–78 Eredivisie (basketball) =

Eredivisie
- League: Eredivisie
- Sport: Basketball
- Number of teams: 10

Regular season
- Top seed: EBBC Den Bosch
- Season MVP: Art Collins (Leiden)

Finals
- Champions: Leiden; 1st title
- Runners-up: Punch

Seasons
- ← 1976–77 1978–79 →

The 1977–78 Eredivisie was the 17th season of the highest-level basketball league in the Netherlands, and the 32nd season of the top flight Dutch basketball competition.

It was the first season with the introduction of the playoffs. Leiden won its first national championship.

== Regular season ==
Pos.	Club	Pld	W	L	Pts	PCT	PF	PA	Diff	Qualification or relegation
1	EBBC Den Bosch	36	30	6	60	83.3%	3589	3117	472	Advance to playoffs
2	Donar	36	28	8	56	77.8%	3273	2899	374	Advance to playoffs
3	Leiden(C)	36	26	10	52	72.2%	3427	3158	269	Advance to playoffs
4	Punch	36	20	16	40	55.6%	3407	3263	144	Advance to playoffs
5	BOB Oud-Beijerland	36	20	16	40	55.6%	3382	3372	10	
6	Arke Reizen Enschede	36	15	21	30	41.7%	3200	3280	-80	
7	Haarlem	36	15	21	30	41.7%	3171	3150	21	
8	Amsterdam	36	14	22	28	38.9%	3059	3103	-44	
9	RZ	36	11	25	22	30.6%	3082	3259	-177	
10	Amstelveen	36	1	35	0	2.8%	2717	3706	-989	

(C): Champions

== Playoffs ==
Teams in italics had home court advantage and played the first and third leg at home.

=== Bracket ===
Semifinals
1	EBBC Den Bosch	1
4	Punch	2
2	Donar	0
3	Leiden	2

Finals
4	Punch	1
3	Leiden	2

=== Semifinals ===
Team 1	Series	Team 2	Game 1	Game 2	Game 3
EBBC Den Bosch	1–2	Punch	115–112	99–100	89–95
Donar	1–2	Leiden	75–116	99–106	

=== Finals ===
Team 1	Series	Team 2	Game 1	Game 2	Game 3
Punch	1–2	Leiden	86–95	109–97	98–118

== Final standings ==
Pos.	Club	Qualification
1	Leiden (C)	Qualification for 1978–79 FIBA European Champions Cup
2	Punch	
3	EBBC Den Bosch	Qualification for 1978–79 FIBA European Cup Winners' Cup
4	Donar	
5	BOB Oud-Beijerland	
6	Arke Reizen Enschede	
7	Haarlem	
8	Canadians Amsterdam	
9	RZ	
10	BV Amstelveen	

== Individual awards ==
Category	Player	Team(s)	Ref.
Most Valuable Player	Art Collins	Leiden	
Coach of the Year	Jim Parks	Donar	
Rookie of the Year	Erik van Solm	RZ	
Winner Dunk Contest	Donald Washington	RZ	
Referee of the Year	John Barrett	–	

=== All-league Team ===
Pos.	Player	Team
G	Art Collins	Leiden
G	Bill Mallory	BOB Oud-Beijerland
F	Kees Akerboom Sr.	Den Bosch
F	Gary Freeman	Haarlem
C	Donald Washington	RZ

=== All-Defense Team ===
Player	Team
Renso Zwiers	Donar
Jim Woudstra	Punch
Charles Kirkland	Den Bosch
Bill Mallory	BOB Oud-Beijerland
Pete Miller	Donar

== In European competitions ==
Competition	Team	Result
1977–78 FIBA European Cup Winners' Cup	EBBC Den Bosch	Quarterfinalist
