= 1981–82 Eredivisie (basketball) =

- League: Eredivisie
- Sport: Basketball
- Number of teams: 10

Regular season
- Top seed: Nashua Den Bosch
- Season MVP: Wilson Washington (BV Amstelveen)

Playoffs
- Finals champions: Nationale Nederlanden Donar (1st title)
- Runners-up: Nashua Den Bosch

Seasons
- ← 1981–82 1982–83 →

The 1982–83 Eredivisie was the 21st season of the highest-level basketball league in the Netherlands, and the 34th season of the top flight Dutch basketball competition.

It was the first season in which the finals were played in a best-of-five series. Donar (known as Nationale Nederlanden Donar) won its first national title.

== Regular season ==
Pos	Team	Pld	W	L	PF	PA	PD	Pts	Qualification or relegation
1	Nashua Den Bosch	36	31	5	3327	2881	+446	67	Qualification to playoffs
2	Nationale Nederlanden Donar	36	29	7	3540	3000	+540	65	Qualification to playoffs
3	Parker Leiden	36	28	8	3241	2764	+477	64	Qualification to playoffs
4	BV Amstelveen	36	22	14	3138	2966	+172	58	Qualification to playoffs
5	Rucanor Tristars Delft	36	18	18	2984	2991	−7	54	
6	Eve & Adam Stars Haarlem	36	14	22	2682	2924	−242	50	
7	Frisol Rowic Dordrecht	36	11	25	2900	3167	−267	47	
8	Black Velvet Canadians Amsterdam	36	10	26	2719	3027	−308	46	
9	Hatrans Haaksbergen	36	9	27	2954	3325	−371	45	
10	Albert van Zoonen Cracks Noordkop Den Helder	36	8	28	2782	3222	−440	44	

Source: Basketball Happenings

== Playoffs ==
Teams in italics had home court advantage and played the first and third leg at home.

=== Bracket ===
Semifinals
1	Nashua Den Bosch	2
4	BV Amstelveen	1
2	Donar	2
3	Parker Leiden	1

Finals
1	Nashua Den Bosch	1
2	Donar	3
