= 1979–80 Eredivisie (basketball) =

Eredivisie
- League: Eredivisie
- Sport: Basketball
- Number of teams: 11

Regular season
- Top seed: Parker Leiden
- Season MVP: Kees Akerboom Sr. (Den Bosch)

Playoffs
- Finals champions: Nashua Den Bosch (2nd title)
- Runners-up: Parker Leiden

Seasons
- ← 1978–79 1980–81 →

The 1979–80 Eredivisie was the 19th season of the highest-level basketball league in the Netherlands, and the 32nd season of the top flight Dutch basketball competition.

BV Groningen entered the league, which was expanded to eleven teams. Nashua Den Bosch won its second league title, and its second consecutive.

== Regular season ==
Pos	Team	Pld	W	L	PF	PA	PD	Pts	Qualification or relegation
1	Parker Leiden	40	37	3	4243	3310	+933	77	Qualification to playoffs
2	Nashua Den Bosch	40	34	6	3988	3013	+975	74	Qualification to playoffs
3	BV Amstelveen	40	30	10	3823	3340	+483	70	Qualification to playoffs
4	Nationale Nederlanden Donar	40	24	16	3854	3464	+390	64	Qualification to playoffs
5	Eve & Adam Stars Haarlem	40	22	18	3803	3763	+40	62	
6	Punch Delft	40	21	19	3834	3740	+94	61	
7	Frisol Rowic Dordrecht	40	18	22	3602	3755	−153	58	
8	BOB Oud Beijerland	40	14	26	3566	3883	−317	54	
9	Delta Lloyd Amsterdam	40	13	27	3597	3727	−130	53	
10	Rotterdam Zuid	40	5	35	3414	4268	−854	43 (Note: Rotterdam Zuid refused to play a game against Frisol Rowic, they lost 0–2 and were given two points deduction.)	
11	BV Groningen	40	2	38	3304	4765	−1461	42	

Source: Basketball Happenings

== Playoffs ==
Teams in italics had home court advantage and played the first and third leg at home.

=== Bracket ===
Semifinals
1	Parker Leiden	2
4	Donar	0
2	Nashua Den Bosch	2
3	BV Amstelveen	1

Finals
1	Parker Leiden	1
2	Nashua Den Bosch	2
