= 1960–61 Eredivisie (basketball) =

1st season of Dutch basketball Eredivisie

Eredivisie
- League: Eredivisie
- Sport: Basketball
- Number of teams: 12
- Season champions: The Wolves Amsterdam (1st title)

Eredivisie seasons
- 1961–62 →

The 1960–61 Eredivisie was the 1st season of the highest-level basketball league in the Netherlands, and the 15th season of the top flight Dutch basketball competition. The Wolves Amsterdam won the title.

== Standings ==
Pos.	Club	Pld	W	L	Pts	PCT	PF	PA	Diff	Qualification or relegation
1	The Wolves Amsterdam (C)	22	20	2	40	90,91	1653	1313	340	Qualification for 1961–62 FIBA European Champions Cup
2	Blue Stars Diemen	22	17	5	34	77,27	1526	1383	143	
3	Herly Amsterdam	22	16	6	32	72,73	1304	1210	94	
4	Landlust Amsterdam	22	13	9	26	59,09	1447	1247	200	
5	Monark Amsterdam	22	11	11	22	50,00	1435	1324	111	
6	SV Argus	22	11	11	22	50,00	1357	1307	50	
7	DED	22	10	12	20	45,45	1410	1409	1	
8	US Amstelveen	22	10	12	20	45,45	1226	1302	-76	
9	Punch	22	9	13	18	40,91	1254	1271	-17	
10	The Arrows Rotterdam	22	9	13	18	40,91	1188	1367	-179	
11	Flamingo's Haarlem	22	5	17	10	22,73	1275	1501	-226	
12	ZBVS Haarlem	22	1	21	-6	4,55	898	1339	-441	

(C): Champions; Source: J-dus.com
