= 1961–62 Eredivisie (basketball) =

2nd season of Dutch basketball Eredivisie

Eredivisie
- League: Eredivisie
- Sport: Basketball
- Number of teams: 12
- Season champions: Landlust Amsterdam (1st title)

Eredivisie seasons
- ← 1960–61 1962–63 →

The 1961–62 Eredivisie was the 2nd season of the highest-level basketball league in the Netherlands, and the 16th season of the top flight Dutch basketball competition. Landlust Amsterdam won the title and qualified for the 1962–63 FIBA European Champions Cup.

== Standings ==
Pos.	Club	Pld	Pts	Qualification or relegation
1	Landlust Amsterdam (C)	22	44	Qualification for 1962–63 FIBA European Champions Cup
2	The Wolves Amsterdam	22	34	
3	Blue Stars Diemen	22	24	
4	Herly Amsterdam	22	24	
5	Agon Amsterdam	22	22	
6	Monark Amsterdam	22	20	
7	DED	22	20	
8	Punch Delft	22	20	
9	The Arrows Rotterdam	22	20	
10	Argus Den Haag	23	20	
11	US Amstelveen	23	18	
12	Typhoons Haarlem	22	0	

(C): Champions; Source: J-dus.com
