= 1982–83 Eredivisie (basketball) =

- League: Eredivisie
- Sport: Basketball
- Number of teams: 10

Regular season
- Top seed: Nashua Den Bosch
- Season MVP: David Lawrence (Donar)

Playoffs
- Finals champions: Nashua Den Bosch (3rd title)
- Runners-up: Hatrans Haaksbergen

Seasons
- ← 1981–82 1984–84 →

The 1982–83 Eredivisie was the 22nd season of the highest-level basketball league in the Netherlands, and the 35th season of the top flight Dutch basketball competition.

== Regular season ==
| Pos | Team | Pld | W | L | PF | PA | PD | Pts | Qualification or relegation |
|---|---|---|---|---|---|---|---|---|---|
| 1 | Nashua Den Bosch (O, C) | 36 | 31 | 5 | 3380 | 2724 | +656 | 67 | Qualification to playoffs |
| 2 | Hatrans Haaksbergen | 36 | 27 | 9 | 3543 | 3169 | +374 | 63 | Qualification to playoffs |
| 3 | Elmex Leiden | 36 | 26 | 10 | 3030 | 2652 | +378 | 62 | Qualification to playoffs |
| 4 | Donar Groningen | 36 | 25 | 11 | 2956 | 2782 | +174 | 61 | Qualification to playoffs |
| 5 | Rucanor Tristars Delft | 36 | 17 | 19 | 3030 | 3117 | −87 | 53 | |
| 6 | ONRO Rotterdam Zuid | 36 | 14 | 22 | 2996 | 3228 | −232 | 50 | |
| 7 | Coveco BS Weert | 36 | 13 | 23 | 3036 | 3229 | −193 | 49 | |
| 8 | Albert van Zoonen Cracks Noordkop Den Helder | 36 | 11 | 25 | 2769 | 3211 | −442 | 47 | |
| 9 | Stars Haarlem | 36 | 8 | 28 | 2793 | 3124 | −331 | 44 | |
| 10 | Black Velvet Canadians Amsterdam | 36 | 8 | 28 | 2921 | 3218 | −297 | 44 | |

Source: Basketball Happenings
(C) Champions; (O) Play-off winners

== Playoffs ==
Teams in italics had home court advantage and played the first and third leg at home.

=== Bracket ===
Semifinals
1 | Nashua Den Bosch | 2
4 | Donar | 0
2 | Hatrans Haaksbergen | 2
3 | Elmex Leiden | 0

Finals
1 | Nashua Den Bosch | 3
2 | Hatrans Haaksbergen | 1
