= 1980–81 Eredivisie (basketball) =

Eredivisie
- League: Eredivisie
- Sport: Basketball
- Number of teams: 10

Regular season
- Top seed: Parker Leiden
- Season MVP: Kees Akerboom Sr. (Den Bosch)

Playoffs
- Finals champions: Nashua Den Bosch (3rd title)
- Runners-up: Parker Leiden

Seasons
- ← 1980–81 1981–82 →

The 1980–81 Eredivisie was the 20th season of the highest-level basketball league in the Netherlands, and the 33rd season of the top flight Dutch basketball competition.

== Regular season ==
Pos	Team	Pld	W	L	PF	PA	PD	Pts	Qualification or relegation
1	Parker Leiden	36	31	5	3564	2697	+867	67	Qualification to playoffs
2	Nashua Den Bosch	36	31	5	3503	2739	+764	67	Qualification to playoffs
3	BV Amstelveen	36	23	13	3148	2859	+289	59	Qualification to playoffs
4	Delta Lloyd Amsterdam	36	22	14	2899	2719	+180	58	Qualification to playoffs
5	Nationale Nederlanden Donar	36	22	14	3238	2898	+340	58	
6	Frisol Rowic Dordrecht	36	19	17	2834	2736	+98	55	
7	Eve & Adam Stars Haarlem	36	16	20	2986	2974	+12	52	
8	Punch Delft	36	9	27	3172	3454	−282	45	
9	Hatrans Haaksbergen	36	7	29	2896	3345	−449	43	
10	BOB Oud-Beijerland	36	0	36	2543	4362	−1819	32 (Note: BOB Oud-Beijerland were deducted 4 points for not showing up for two games.)	

Source: Basketball Happenings

== Playoffs ==
Teams in italics had home court advantage and played the first and third leg at home.

=== Bracket ===
Semifinals
1	Parker Leiden	2
4	Delta Lloyd Amsterdam	1
2	Nashua Den Bosch	2
3	BV Amstelveen	0

Finals
1	Parker Leiden	0
2	Nashua Den Bosch	2
