= 1978–79 Eredivisie (basketball) =

Eredivisie
- League: Eredivisie
- Sport: Basketball
- Number of teams: 10

Regular season
- Top seed: EBBC Den Bosch
- Season MVP: James Lister (EBBC Den Bosch)
- Relegated to Second Division: BV Amstelveen

Playoffs
- Finals champions: EBBC Den Bosch (1st title)
- Runners-up: Parker Leiden

Seasons
- ← 1978–79 1979–80 →

The 1978–79 Eredivisie was the 18th season of the highest-level basketball league in the Netherlands, and the 32nd season of the top flight Dutch basketball competition.

== Regular season ==
Pos	Team	Pld	W	L	PF	PA	PD	Qualification or relegation
1	EBBC Den Bosch	36	31	5	3604	2933	+671	Qualification to playoffs
2	Parker Leiden	36	30	6	3629	3132	+497	Qualification to playoffs
3	Nationale Nederlanden Donar Groningen	36	25	11	3560	3357	+203	Qualification to playoffs
4	Radio Musette Rotterdam Zuid	36	25	11	3513	3305	+208	Qualification to playoffs
5	BOB Oud Beijerland	36	15	21	3453	3610	−157	
6	Delta Lloyd Amsterdam	36	14	22	3229	3222	+7	
7	Flamingo’s Haarlem	36	12	24	3070	3372	−302	
8	Frisol Rowic Dordrecht	37	11	26	3451	3706	−255	Qualification to relegation game
9	Punch Delft	37	10	27	3389	3750	−361	Qualification to relegation game
10	BV Amstelveen	36	8	28	3029	3540	−511	Relegation

Source: Basketball Happenings

== Relegation game ==
The two bottom teams played one game to determine the team that was relegated. Eventually, both teams returned for the 1979–80 season.

Team 1	Score	Team 2
Frisol Rowic Dordrecht	89–87	Punch Delft

== Playoffs ==
Teams in italics had home court advantage and played the first and third leg at home.

=== Bracket ===
Semifinals
1	EBBC Den Bosch	2
4	Rotterdam-Zuid	0
2	Parker Leiden	2
3	Donar	0

Finals
1	EBBC Den Bosch	2
2	Parker Leiden	0
