= Zander Wiel =

American baseball player (born 1993)

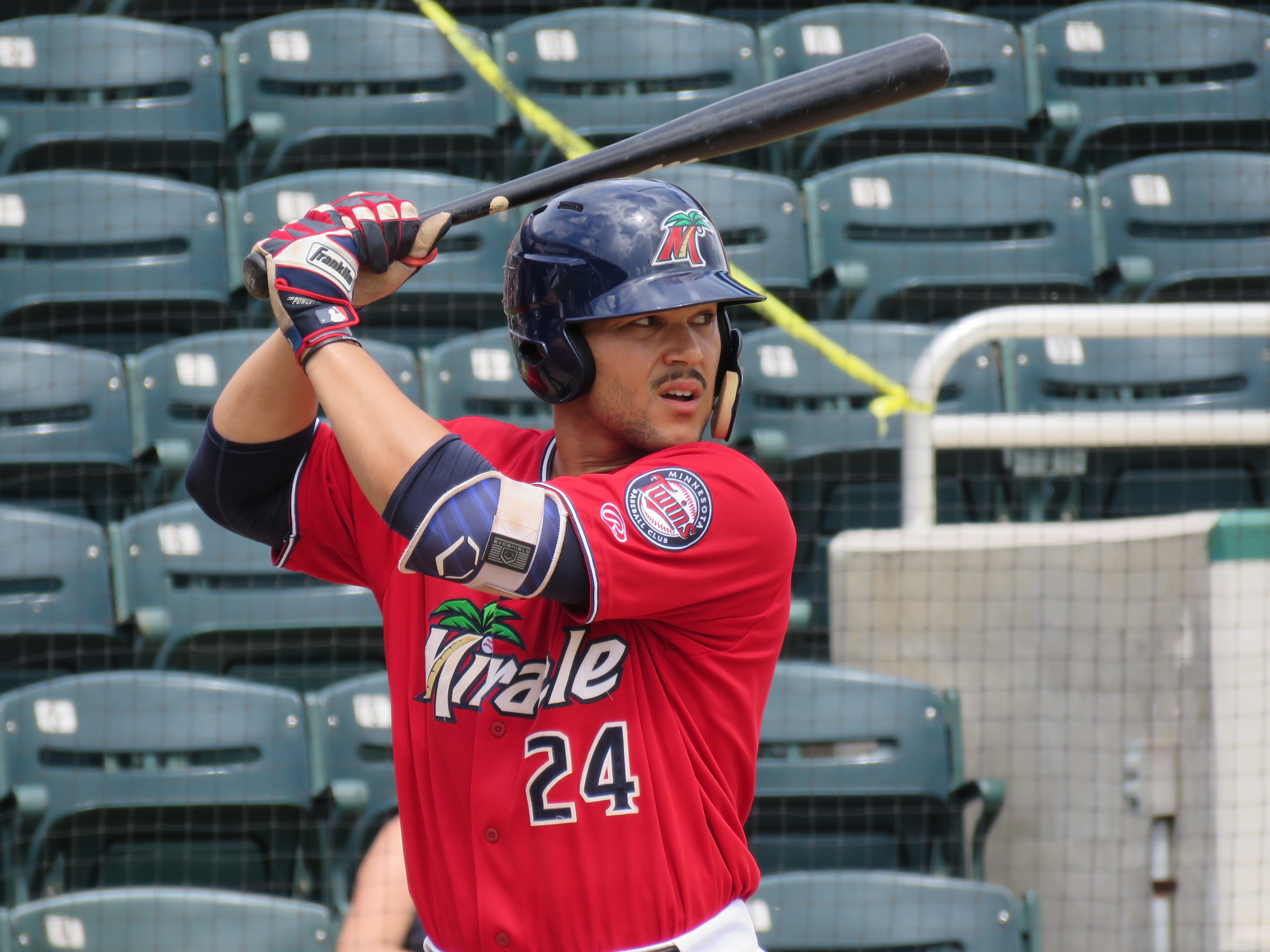
- Wiel with the Fort Myers Miracle

Free agent
- Outfielder / First baseman
- Born: January 11, 1993 (age 33); Murfreesboro, Tennessee, U.S.
- Bats: Right Throws: Right

Alexander McBrayer "Zander" Wiel (born January 11, 1993) is an American professional baseball outfielder and first baseman who is a free agent. He was drafted by the Minnesota Twins in the 12th round of the 2015 Major League Baseball draft. He has been on the Netherlands national baseball team in the World Baseball Classic.

== Early life and amateur career ==
Wiel was born and grew up in Murfreesboro, Tennessee. When he was three, his father, Randy Wiel, became the basketball coach at Middle Tennessee State. Wiel attended Blackman High School and was named first team All-District and first team All-Region his final three years of high school.

Wiel then attended Vanderbilt University. Wiel redshirted his freshman season in 2012. As a redshirt freshman, he batted .305 with five home runs and 27 RBIs in 82 at bats. He was named to the Freshman All-SEC team. The following year, his first full season as a starter, Wiel batted .260 with five home runs and 44 RBIs as the Commodores won the College World Series. After the season, he played collegiate summer baseball with the Bourne Braves of the Cape Cod Baseball League, and the Sanford Mainers of the New England Collegiate Baseball League. As a redshirt junior, he posted a .316 average with 14 home runs and a team-high 65 RBIs in 2015 for Vanderbilt.

== Professional career ==
=== Minnesota Twins ===
Wiel was selected in the 12th round of the 2015 MLB draft by the Minnesota Twins. After signing, he was assigned to the Elizabethton Twins of the rookie-level Appalachian League, hitting .194 in 13 games played before breaking his hand in July. The following season, Wiel played for the Cedar Rapids Kernels of the Midwest League, playing in 128 games with a .259 batting average with 19 home runs, 86 RBIs and 75 runs scored. In 2017 he batted .250 with 13 home runs and 67 RBIs for the Class A Advanced Fort Myers Miracle. Wiel began the 2018 season with the Double-A Chattanooga Lookouts batted .311 with seven home runs and 58 RBIs. He started in the Southern League All-Star Game. He earned a late season promotion to the Triple-A Rochester Red Wings. Wiel spent the 2019 season with Rochester and hit .254 with 40 doubles and 24 home runs.

Wiel did not play in a game in 2020, due to the cancellation of the minor league season because of the COVID-19 pandemic. Wiel was added to the Twins' 60-man player pool for the shortened MLB season, but he did not appear in the majors. In 2021, Wiel played in 2 games for the Triple-A St. Paul Saints before landing on the injured list on May 12 with an undisclosed injury, later revealed to be a quadriceps injury. The Twins released Wiel on August 25, after he began a rehab assignment.

=== Independent baseball ===
On February 16, 2022, Wiel signed with the High Point Rockers of the Atlantic League of Professional Baseball. Wiel played in 115 games for the Rockers, slashing .260/.344/.576 with 11 stolen bases. His 32 home runs and 98 RBI were both franchise records. Following the regular season, Wiel was named an Atlantic League All-Star.

In 2023, Wiel played in 113 games for the Rockers, hitting .276/.349/.552 with 29 home runs and 96 RBI. On April 15, 2024, Wiel re-signed with High Point. In 60 games in 2024, he hit .188/.302/.436 with 13 home runs and 33 RBI.

Wiel set new franchise records with High Point with 74 home runs and 227 RBI with the team.

On July 7, Wiel was traded to the York Revolution for Will Carter. In 60 games for the Revolution, he batted .323/.396/.633 with 17 home runs and 58 RBI. With York, Wiel won the Atlantic League championship. In the final game of championship series, he scored the game-tying run in the bottom of the ninth inning.

On January 28, 2025, Wiel signed with the Piratas de Campeche of the Mexican League. He was released by the Piratas prior to the start of the season on April 13.

== International career ==
Wiel represented the Netherlands national team at the 2023 World Baseball Classic. He did not play in any of the team's four tournament games. Wiel does not speak Dutch. Because he does not have a Dutch passport, he cannot play for the Netherlands in other international tournaments.

== Personal life ==
Wiel's father, Randy Wiel, played college basketball at the University of North Carolina and was the head basketball coach at UNC Asheville, Middle Tennessee State, and the Netherlands men's national team. Randy is from Curaçao and took his son to Curaçao and the Netherlands as a child. Randy died in 2025 from pancreatic cancer. Wiel has two siblings.
