= Steuer =

Steuer is a German surname. Notable people with the surname include:

- Anni Steuer (1913–2007), German hurdler
- Christin Steuer (born 1983), German diver
- Egon Steuer (born 1935), Czech basketball player
- Feliks Steuer (1889–1950), Silesian educationist
- Heiko Steuer (born 1939), German archaeologist
- Ingo Steuer (born 1966), German pair skater and skating coach
- Jon Paul Steuer (1984–2018), American actor
- Jonathan Steuer (born 1965), American online publisher
- Lothar Steuer (1893-1957), German politician
- Lowie Steuer (born 1995), Belgian volleyball player
- Max Steuer (1870–1940), American trial attorney
- Noemi Steuer (1957–2020) Swiss-born actress
- Aron Steuer (1898–1985), American lawyer and judge

== See also ==
- Rivalen am Steuer, an East German film released in 1957
