= Bartolome =

Bartolome is a Tagalog surname and may refer to:

- Alex Bartolome (1958–2000), Filipino rapist and last person executed in the Philippines
- Donnalyn Bartolome (1994), Filipina internet personality, vlogger, singer, songwriter and rapper
- Heber Bartolome (1948–2021), Filipino folk and rock singer, songwriter, composer, poet, guitarist and bandurria
- Vic Bartolome (1948), American former professional basketball player
