= Lucas N'Guessan =

Dutch basketball player (born 1997)

No. 10 – Real Valladolid Baloncesto
- Position: Center
- League: LEB Oro

Personal information
- Born: 6 November 1997 (age 28) De Lier, Netherlands
- Listed height: 2.13 m (7 ft 0 in)
- Listed weight: 100 kg (220 lb)

Career information
- College: Oklahoma State (2016–2018); East Tennessee State (2018–2020)
- NBA draft: 2020: undrafted
- Playing career: 2020–present

Career history
- 2020–2021: Força Lleida
- 2021–2022: Yoast United
- 2022–2024: Navarra
- 2024: Astros de Jalisco
- 2025: Real Valladolid Baloncesto
- 2025-2026: Phoenix Hagen

Marinus Lucas N'Guessan (born 6 November 1997) is a Dutch basketball player who plays for Real Valladolid Basketball of the LEB Oro. Standing at 2.13 m (7 ft 0 in), he plays as center.

== Early life ==
Born in De Lier to an Ivorian father and Dutch mother, N'Guessan moved to Spain at age 16 to play for the Canarias Basketball Academy (CBA).

== College career ==
N'Guessan started his college career with Oklahoma State, where he played two seasons. He then transferred to East Tennessee State. In his senior year, he averaged 9 points and 6 rebounds in 21 minutes.

== Professional career ==
In August 2020, N'Guessan signed his first professional contract with Força Lleida. He averaged 4.2 points and 3.4 rebounds over 17 games.

On 7 July 2021, N'Guessan signed with Yoast United in the Netherlands.

On 8 February 2022, N'Guessan left United when he returned to Spain to play with Navarra of the LEB Oro.

On August 14, 2022, he signs for the Peñas Huesca Basketball Club of the LEB Oro. Due to the bad season, the team is relegated to LEB Plata.

On January 24, 2023, he left the discipline at Club Baloncesto Peñas Huesca to sign for Real Valladolid Baloncesto of the LEB Oro.

== National team career ==
In the summer of 2021, N'Guessan was selected for the preliminary team of the Netherlands national basketball team.
