= Randy Wiel =

Dutch basketball player (1951–2025)

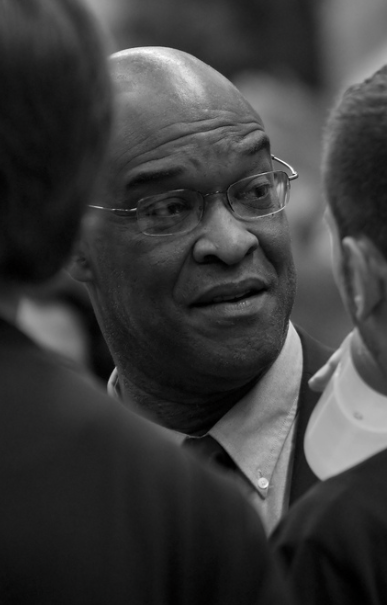
- Wiel in 2011

Personal information
- Born: 21 April 1951 Colony of Curaçao and Dependencies
- Died: 14 October 2025 (aged 74) Murfreesboro, Tennessee, U.S.
- Listed height: 195 cm (6 ft 5 in)

Career information
- College: North Carolina (1975–1979)
- NBA draft: 1979: undrafted
- Playing career: 1979–1985
- Position: Guard
- Coaching career: 1988–2013

Career history

Playing
- 1979–1982: BV Amstelveen
- 1982–1985: Elmex Leiden

Coaching
- 1988–1993: North Carolina (assistant)
- 1991–1993: Netherlands
- 1993–1996: UNC Asheville
- 1996–2002: Middle Tennessee
- 2002–2004: Los Angeles Lakers (scout)
- 2004–2005: EiffelTowers Nijmegen
- 2005–2009: EiffelTowers Den Bosch
- 2011–2013: Rotterdam Basketbal College

Career highlights
- As player: First-team All-Eredivisie (1981); As coach: 2× Eredivisie champion (2006, 2007); 2× Dutch Cup winner (2008, 2009)

Randy Wiel (21 April 1951 – 14 October 2025) was a Dutch basketball player and coach. Standing at 1.95 metres (6 ft 5 in), he played as guard.

== Biography ==
Born and raised on Curaçao, he was a talented athlete in his youth, participating as a swimmer during the 1967 Pan American Games in Winnipeg (Canada) for Curaçao. He worked as a police officer before moving to the United States to play college basketball with North Carolina. After four years, he started his professional career with BV Amstelveen in the Dutch Eredivisie. On 19 December 1979, Wiel scored a career-high 39 points against BV Groningen. From 1982 to 1985, Wiel played for Elmex Leiden.

He started his coaching career in 1988 as an assistant to coach Dean Smith for North Carolina. He secured his first head coach position at North Carolina-Asheville Bulldogs in 1993. From 2002 to 2004, Wiel was a scout for the Los Angeles Lakers of the National Basketball Association (NBA).

From 2004 to 2013 he coached in the Eredivisie. He led EiffelTowers Den Bosch to two national championships, in 2006 and 2007.

== Personal life ==
Wiel's son, Zander Wiel, is a professional baseball player who represented the Netherlands national baseball team at the 2023 World Baseball Classic.

Randy Wiel died from pancreatic cancer at his home in Murfreesboro, Tennessee on 14 October 2025, at the age of 74.

== Honours ==
=== Player ===
North Carolina Tar Heels

- NCAA Division I: runner-up 1977

Netherlands

- EuroBasket: fourth place 1983

=== (assistent) Coach ===
North Carolina Tar Heels

- NCAA Division I: 1993

EiffelTowers Den Bosch

- Dutch Basketball League: 2006, 2007
- Dutch National Basketball Cup: 2008, 2009

=== Individual ===
- Best basketball player on Aruba: 1974
- Sports figure of the year: runner-up 1974
- Top scorer Dutch Basketball League
