= Wilson Washington =

American basketball player and coach

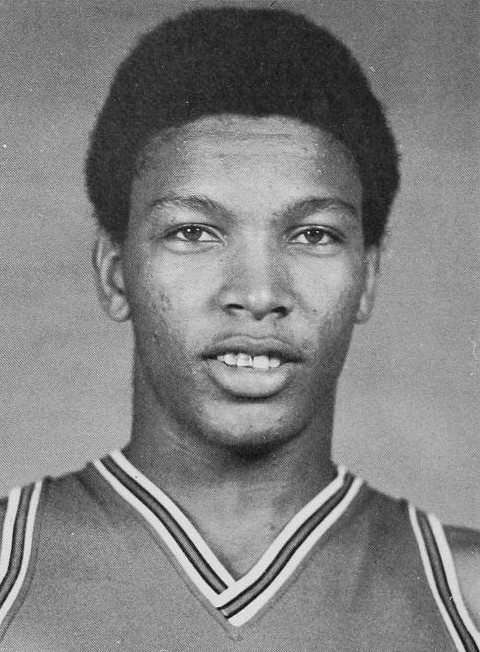

Personal information
- Born: August 3, 1955 (age 71) Norfolk, Virginia, U.S.
- Listed height: 6 ft 9 in (2.06 m)
- Listed weight: 227 lb (103 kg)

Career information
- High school: Booker T. Washington (Norfolk, Virginia)
- College: Maryland (1973–1974); Old Dominion (1974–1977)
- NBA draft: 1977: 2nd round, 25th overall pick
- Drafted by: Philadelphia 76ers
- Playing career: 1977–1983
- Position: Power forward / center
- Number: 52, 42

Career history
- 1977–1978: Philadelphia 76ers
- 1978–1979: New Jersey Nets
- 1979–1980: Stella Azzurra Roma
- 1980–1982: BV Amstelveen
- 1982–1983: Elmex Leiden

Career highlights
- Eredivisie MVP (1982); 3× First-team All-Eredivisie (1978, 1981, 1982); 2× Eredivisie All-Defensive Team (1981, 1982); NCAA Division II champion (1975); NCAA Division II Tournament MVP (1975); First-team Division II All-American (1976); No. 52 retired by Old Dominion Monarchs

Career NBA statistics
- Points: 731 (7.3 ppg)
- Rebounds: 450 (4.5 rpg)
- FG%: .497
- Stats at NBA.com
- Stats at Basketball Reference

Wilson Washington Jr. (born August 3, 1955) is an American former basketball player and a former assistant coach at Norfolk State University. Washington was an All-American player at Old Dominion University and played for two seasons in the National Basketball Association.

== College career ==
From Norfolk, Virginia's Booker T. Washington High School, Washington first went to Maryland to play for coach Lefty Driesell. However, he left the school after only one game. He transferred to Division II Old Dominion, where he and the team found great success. As a sophomore in 1974–75, Washington averaged 13.7 points and 12.6 rebounds per game and was named a third team All-American. The Monarchs went 25–6 and defeated New Orleans 76–75 to win the 1975 NCAA Division II national championship. Washington was named the tournament MVP.

As a junior, Washington averaged 17.9 points and 13.5 rebounds and led the Monarchs to a 19–12 record in a season where the Monarchs played many Division I teams in anticipation of moving up a level the next year. ODU again made the Division II Final Four, this time losing to Puget Sound in the national semifinals. Washington was named a first team all-American at the close of the season. As a senior, Washington led the Monarchs to a respectable 25–4 record in their first Division I season. He averaged 18 points and 11.4 rebounds and was named ODU's first Division I All-American, earning AP honorable mention honors in 1977.

For his three-year ODU career, Washington scored 1,366 points (16.9 per game), collected 1,011 rebounds (12.5 per game) and blocked 363 shots.

== Professional career ==
After the close of his college career, Washington was selected in the second round (25th pick overall) of the 1977 NBA draft by the Philadelphia 76ers. He played sparingly for the Sixers, averaging 1.4 points and 1.0 rebounds in just 2.7 minutes per game. After 14 games, he was traded to the New Jersey Nets, where he enjoyed a larger role off the bench. He returned to the Nets for the 1978–79 season, averaging 8.1 points and 4.7 rebounds per game.

Following his time in the NBA, Washington played in Italy and the Netherlands.

== Coaching career ==
After several years in business, Washington joined the coaching staff at Norfolk State as an assistant coach for the 2012–13 season. In his first season with the Spartans, they went 26–10 won their first NCAA tournament game against Missouri in an upset.

== Career statistics ==
Legend
GP	Games played	GS	Games started	MPG	Minutes per game
FG%	Field goal percentage	3P%	3-point field goal percentage	FT%	Free throw percentage
RPG	Rebounds per game	APG	Assists per game	SPG	Steals per game
BPG	Blocks per game	PPG	Points per game	**Bold**	Career high

=== NBA ===
==== Regular season ====
Year	Team	GP	GS	MPG	FG%	FT%	RPG	APG	SPG	BPG	PPG
1977–78	Philadelphia	14	0	2.7	.421	.500	1.0	.1	.1	.1	1.4
1977–78	New Jersey	24		**21.8**	.492	.553	**5.9**	.4	**.7**	**1.5**	**8.8**
1978–79	New Jersey	**62**		18.4	**.502**	**.635**	4.7	**.8**	.5	1.1	8.1
Career		100	0	17.0	.497	.605	4.5	.6	.5	1.0	7.3
