= Art Collins (basketball) =

American basketball player (born 1954)

Personal information
- Born: April 14, 1954 (age 72) Sandersville, Georgia, U.S.
- Listed height: 6 ft 4 in (1.93 m)
- Listed weight: 185 lb (84 kg)

Career information
- High school: Miami Jackson (Miami, Florida)
- College: St. Thomas (1972–1976)
- NBA draft: 1976: 6th round, 17th overall pick
- Drafted by: Boston Celtics
- Playing career: 1976–1981
- Position: Shooting guard
- Number: 44

Career history
- 1976–1977: Flamingo's Haarlem
- 1977–1979: Parker Leiden
- 1980–1981: Atlanta Hawks

Career highlights
- Eredivisie MVP (1978); 2× First-team All-Eredivisie (1978, 1979)
- Stats at NBA.com
- Stats at Basketball Reference

Arthur Collins (born April 14, 1954) is an American former basketball player. He played collegiately for St. Thomas University.

Collins was selected by the Boston Celtics in the sixth round (103rd pick overall) of the 1976 NBA draft. He played for the Atlanta Hawks (1980–81) in the National Basketball Association (NBA) for 29 games.

== Career statistics ==
Legend
GP	Games played	GS	Games started	MPG	Minutes per game
FG%	Field goal percentage	3P%	3-point field goal percentage	FT%	Free throw percentage
RPG	Rebounds per game	APG	Assists per game	SPG	Steals per game
BPG	Blocks per game	PPG	Points per game	**Bold**	Career high

=== NBA ===
==== Regular season ====
Year	Team	GP	MPG	FG%	3P%	FT%	RPG	APG	SPG	BPG	PPG
1980–81	Atlanta	29	13.6	.354	.000	.667	1.4	.9	.4	.0	3.2

== Honors ==
=== Club ===
Parker Leiden

- Eredivisie: (1978)

=== Individual ===
- Eredivisie Most Valuable Player: (1978)
- All-Eredivisie First-Team: (1978, 1979)
