= Dan Cramer (basketball) =

American basketball player (born 1952)

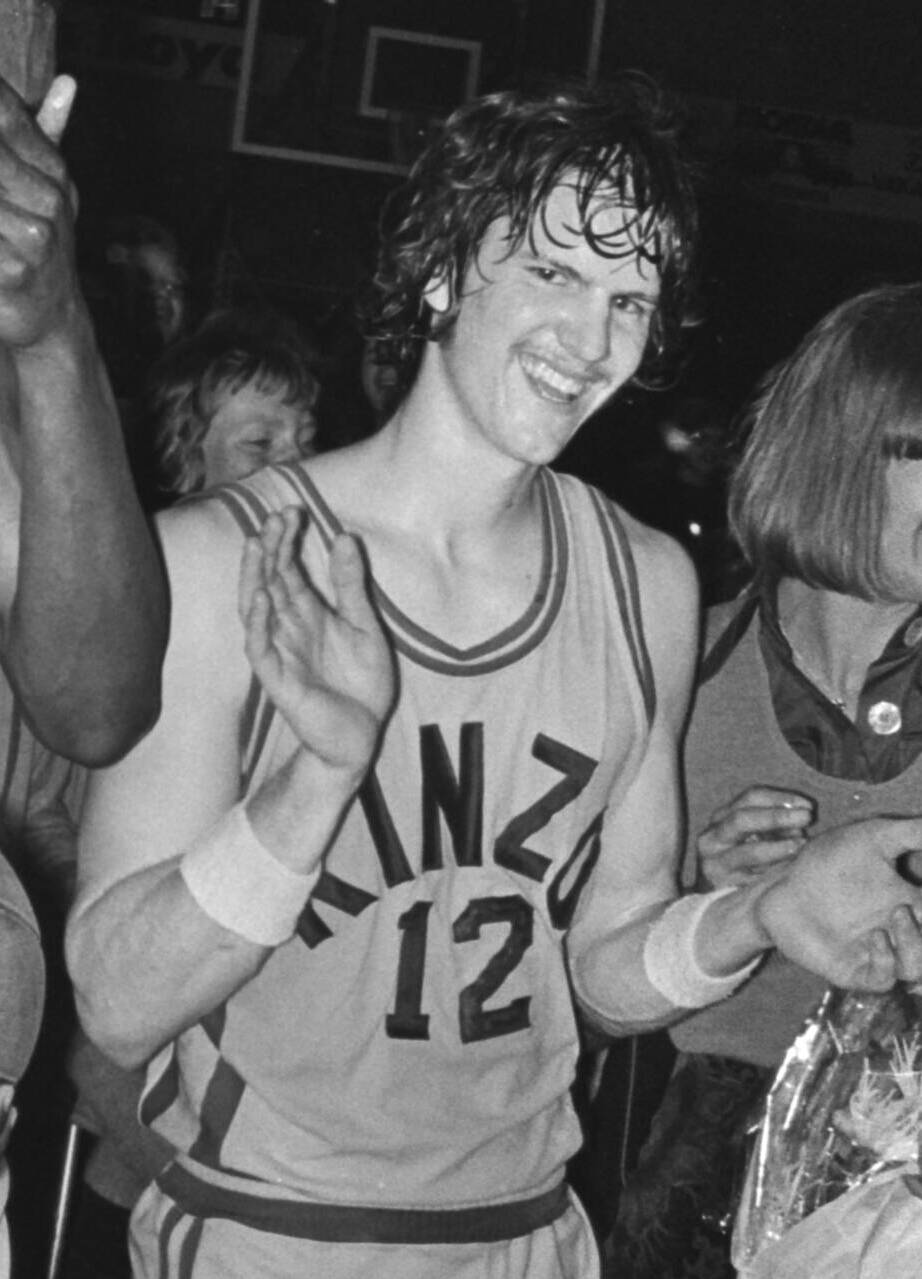
- Cramer in 1976

Personal information
- Born: June 2, 1952 (age 74)
- Listed height: 1.88 m (6 ft 2 in)

Career information
- College: Denver (1971–1974)
- Playing career: 1974–1984
- Position: Forward

Career history
- 1974–1977: BV Amstelveen
- 1977–1978: Arke Stars Enschede
- 1978–1984: Nashua Den Bosch

Career highlights
- 7× Eredivisie champion (1976, 1977, 1979–1981, 1983, 1984); First-team All-Eredivisie (1975); 3× Eredivisie All-Defensive Team (1979, 1981, 1982)

Dan "Danny" Cramer (born June 2, 1952) is a former American-Dutch professional basketball player. Following his college career at Denver, he played ten years of professional basketball in the Netherlands and won seven Eredivisie championships. Cramer also represented the Netherlands national team in 98 games.

== College career ==
Cramer starred at the University of Denver from 1971–1974. A 6 ft 2 in (1.88 m) tall forward, he scored 504 points in 77 games (6.5 per contest) and grabbed a total of 173 rebounds (2.2 per contest). He broke the school’s record for points in a single game when he scored 50 against Southern Mississippi on February 4, 1974. He left school as a Bachelor of Science in Business Administration and had majored in accounting.

== Professional career ==
Cramer spent his professional career in the Netherlands: From 1974 to 1977, he played for Kinzo Amstelveen, winning the Dutch national championship in 1976 and 1977. Cramer emerged as an efficient scorer in the Dutch league, averaging 26.1 points a game in the 1974–75 season, 20.5 in 1975–76 and 18.3 in 1976–77. After spending the 1977–78 with the Arke Stars Enschede, scoring 20.7 points per contest, Cramer joined EBBC Den Bosch (later known as Nashua Den Bosch), where he played from 1978 to 1984. In his six years with Den Bosch, Cramer won Dutch national championships in 1979, 1980, 1981, 1983 and 1984. The best scoring average of his Den Bosch stint came in 1978–79, when he had 18.2 points per outing in the Dutch league. Cramer also appeared in European cup competitions with Den Bosch. In the 1982–83 season, he was instrumental in Den Bosch’s win over Spanish powerhouse FC Barcelona in the Cup Winners' Cup: Cramer had 18 points in the 86–76 upset on January 17, 1983. Cramer and Den Bosch advanced to the semi-final of the competition that season.

== National team career ==
He won 98 caps for the Dutch men’s national team and participated in the European Championships in 1975, 1977, 1979 and 1983. His best single-game performance was at a European championship game in 1975, when he led the Netherlands to a 66–65 win over Greece, scoring 28 points.

== Post-playing career ==
In 1977, he started working for an accounting firm in the Netherlands. Cramer ended his professional basketball in 1984 and returned to the United States. While working in accounting in Colorado, he also started a TV production company, which did TV productions of high school sports. In 1989, Cramer started organizing and promoting 3x3 basketball and later 3v3 soccer as well as 4on4 football.
