= BV Groningen =

- Leagues: 2e divisie
- Founded: 17 December 1969; 56 years ago (original club); 2004; 22 years ago (re-founded)
- Arena: Oude Alo
- Location: Groningen, Netherlands
- Website: bvgroningen.net
Home

BV Groningen, also known as BVG, is a Dutch basketball club based in Groningen. In the 1979–80 season, the team played in the Eredivisie, the highest tier of Dutch basketball.

The club was established on 17 December 1969 by Bil Pijl and Dick Jager. In 1979, the team promoted to the Eredivisie. In its first season, the team had a 2–38 record. The team disappeared in 1994 before it was re-founded in 2004.

== Season by season ==
Season	Tier	League	Pos.	NBB Cup
2024–25	4	2e divisie	2nd	
2025–26	4	2e divisie	3rd	
2026–27	4	2e divisie		Preliminary round
