= Bill Sheridan (basketball) =

American basketball player and coach (1942–2020)

Bill Sheridan Jr.
Personal information
- Born: January 11, 1942 Brooklyn, New York
- Died: December 26, 2020 (aged 78) Lynchburg, Virginia

Career information
- High school: St. Peter's (Staten Island, New York)
- College: Fordham (1960–1963)
- NBA draft: 1963: undrafted

Career history

Coaching
- Virginia Tech (assistant)
- 1973–1976: Punch
- 1974–1976: Netherlands
- 1976–1977: EBBC Den Bosch
- 1980–1982: EBBC Den Bosch
- 1982–1983: Donar
- 1983–1987: Brighton Bears

Career highlights
- As coach: 2× Eredivisie champion (1975, 1981); Dutch Cup champion (1974); 2× Eredivisie Coach of the Year (1975, 1977)

William E. Sheridan Jr. (January 11, 1942 – December 26, 2020) was an American basketball coach. He made a name for himself coaching for several clubs in the Netherlands, as well as for the Dutch national team.

== Early life ==
Sheridan had 2 sisters and 1 brother. He grew up in West Brighton, Staten Island and played for St. Peter's Boys High School, where he was MVP of the All-Star Game between Bronx Catholic All Stars & Staten Island in his senior year. Sheridan was inducted into the Hall of Fame in 2001.[1] He also played baseball, being a pitcher for the Uncle Bill Canlon's Travelers. He served in the United States Marine Corps where he rose to the rank of captain.

== Coaching career ==
Sheridan started his coaching career as an assistant coach with Virginia Technical Institute. In December 1973, Sheridan signed as head coach of Punch Delft of the Dutch Eredivisie. Punch went on a 16-game win streak in the season and also won the NBB Cup. In his second season with Punch, the club won its second ever Eredivisie title.

In 1976, Sheridan transferred to become head coach of EBBC Den Bosch where he coached for one season. EBBC was defeated early in the playoffs and Sheridan was replaced by Ton Boot. However, the following summer, Sheridan returned and won a second Eredivisie title. In the 1981–82 FIBA European Champions Cup, he coached Den Bosch to the semifinal group stage.

In the 1982 offseason, Sheridan signed with Donar where he replaced Maarten van Gent. After one season, he signed with the Brighton Bears in the United Kingdom. The Bears withdrew from the National Basketball League in 1987.

In September 1974, Sheridan was hired as the head coach of the Netherlands national basketball team. On October 25, he won his first international game against Denmark 97–60. He coached the team as well at the EuroBasket 1975, finishing 10th with the Netherlands.

== Personal life ==
Sheridan met his wife, Jacoba, while living in Delft. They had three children and a granddaughter. On December 26, 2020, he died at age 78.
