= Egon Steuer =

Slovak basketball player and coach

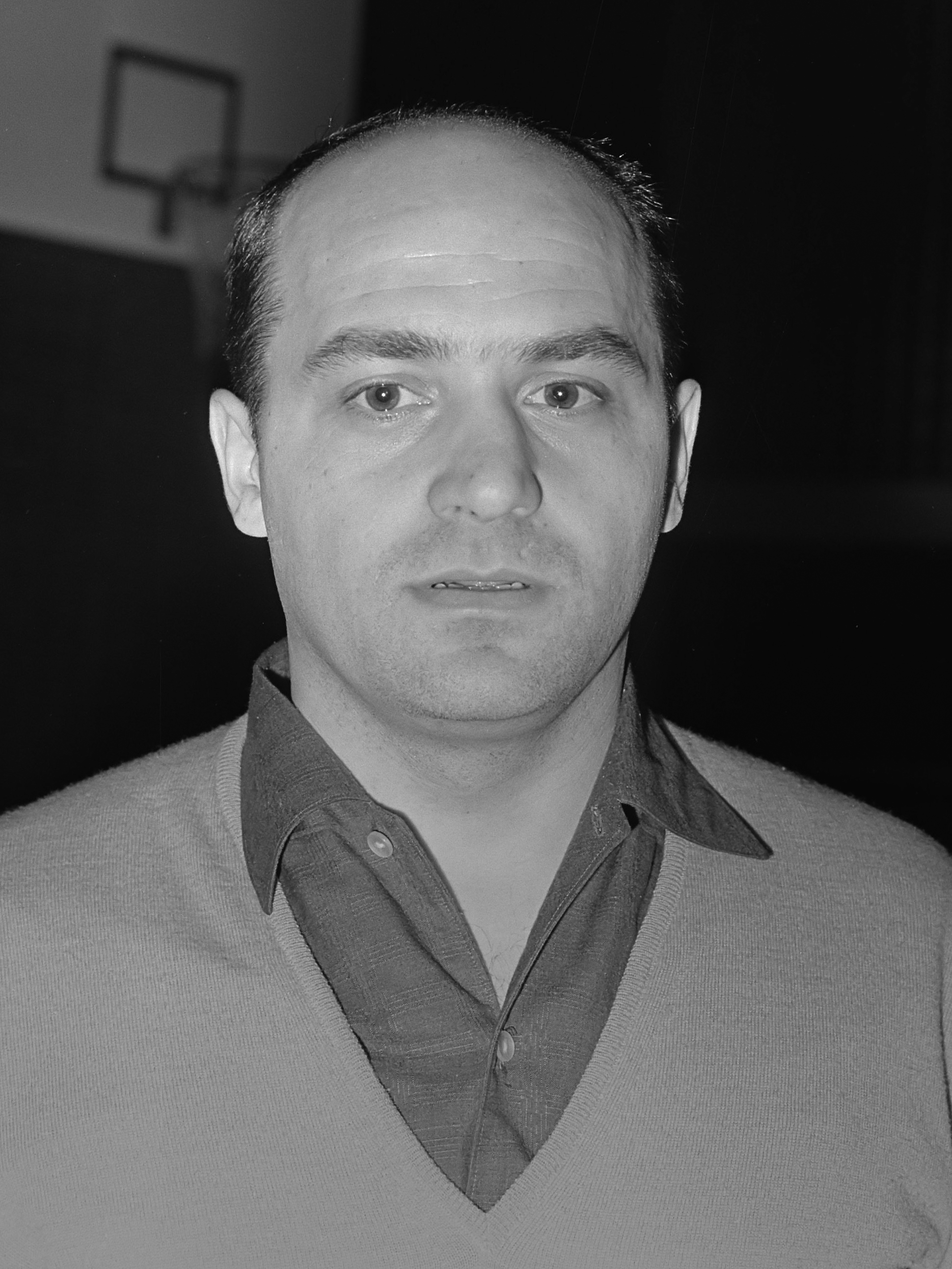
- Steuer in 1969

Personal information
- Born: November 23, 1935 (age 90) Košice, Czechoslovakia

Career history

Playing
- Sparta Prague
- Slovan Bratislava

Coaching
- 1966–1970: Netherlands
- 1970–1978: Olympique Antibes

Egon Steuer (born November 23, 1935) is a Slovak retired basketball player and coach. He played in the professional league of his country, playing for, Sparta Prague, Slovan Bratislava and the Czechoslovakia national team.

== Career as coach ==
=== First episode in the Netherlands ===
In the mid-1960s, Egon Steuer became the head coach of the Netherlands national basketball team. He stayed on for 4 years.

=== Episode in France ===
After his successful tenure in The Netherlands, Egon Steuer was contracted by Olympique Antibes as head coach. With that team he won 2 French National Championships. He stayed in France as a coach for 8 years. He also met his Dutch wife, Yvonne Steuer-Walthausen, while he lived in France. They were married by the Mayor of Nice in a celebrity studded event.

=== Second episode in the Netherlands ===
Together with his Dutch wife, Egon returned to The Netherlands in 1977, and went on to be a successful coach in Dutch basketball teams. He coached, Haarlem, Amsterdam and Den Bosch.

== Career after basketball ==
When he retired from basketball in 1981, Egon refocused on his "other" career, architectural engineering. He worked as an architect for a Dutch agency for 4 years, and co-designed the new headquarter building of Dutch multinational Philips N.V. in Eindhoven. After that, he became president and CEO of one of Amsterdam's leading social housing companies, which grew its portfolio of houses and apartments from several thousands when he started, to close to 40.000 when he retired in 2001. Since his retirement Egon has been active as Managing Advisor for Bouwfonds N.V., a Dutch ABN Amro Bank N.V. owned real estate developer. Steuer is in charge of their Eastern European development.

== Personal life ==
Egon lives with his wife in a suburb of Amsterdam. He has two grown sons, Michael Steuer (1978) and David Steuer (1981).
