= Charles Kirkland =

American retired basketball player (born 1950)

Personal information
- Born: October 18, 1950 (age 75) Chester, Pennsylvania
- Listed height: 6 ft 5 in (1.96 m)
- Listed weight: 190 lb (86 kg)

Career information
- College: Cheyney
- NBA draft: 1982: 8th round, 129th overall pick
- Drafted by: Milwaukee Bucks
- Position: Forward

Career history
- 1974–1976: Punch
- 1977–1981: EBBC Den Bosch
- 1981–1982: Flamingo's Haarlem
- 1982–1983: Donar

Career highlights
- 4× Eredivisie champion (1975, 1979–1981); 6× Eredivisie All-Defensive Team (1976, 1978–1982)
- Stats at Basketball Reference

Charles "Buff" Kirkland (born October 18, 1950) is an American retired basketball player. He was a 6 ft 5 in (1.98 m) tall forward . He was drafted with the 129th pick in the 1972 NBA draft by the Milwaukee Bucks. From 1974 to 1982, Kirkland played in the Dutch Eredivisie, with Punch, EBBC Den Bosch, Flamingo's Haarlem and Donar. He was named to the league's All-Defense Team six times.
