= Harry Rogers (basketball) =

American basketball player

Personal information
- Born: December 31, 1950 (age 75)
- Listed height: 6 ft 7 in (2.01 m)
- Listed weight: 195 lb (88 kg)

Career information
- High school: Sumner (St. Louis, Missouri)
- College: Saint Louis (1970–1973)
- NBA draft: 1973: 4th round, 67th overall pick
- Drafted by: Milwaukee Bucks
- Position: Power forward
- Number: 42

Career history
- 1974–1977: Punch Delft
- 1975: Spirits of St. Louis

Career highlights
- Eredivisie champion (1975); Eredivisie MVP (1975); 2× First-team All-Eredivisie (1975, 1977)
- Stats at Basketball Reference

Harry Jerome Rogers (born December 31, 1950) is an American former basketball player. He played college basketball for the Saint Louis Billikens, before turning professional and starting his career in the Netherlands.

He attended Sumner High School in St. Louis, Missouri. Rogers was inducted into the Missouri Sports Hall of Fame in 1991.

Rogers was drafted by the Milwaukee Bucks in the fourth round of the 1973 NBA draft. He signed with Punch of the Dutch Eredivisie in 1974 and stayed for three seasons. He averaged 23.6 points in his total of 57 games and helped Punch win the 1975 national championship. He also won the Eredivisie's inaugural Most Valuable Player award in 1974–75 after averaging 24.3 points over the season.

Rogers played for the Spirits of St. Louis of the American Basketball Association (ABA) in 1975.
