= Vic Bartolome =

American basketball player (born 1948)

Personal information
- Born: September 29, 1948 (age 78) Santa Barbara, California
- Listed height: 7 ft 0 in (2.13 m)
- Listed weight: 230 lb (104 kg)

Career information
- High school: Santa Barbara (Santa Barbara, California)
- College: Oregon State (1967–1970)
- NBA draft: 1970: 6th round, 87th overall pick
- Drafted by: San Francisco Warriors
- Playing career: 1970–1978
- Position: Center

Career history
- 1970–1971: Libertas Livorno
- 1971–1972: Golden State Warriors
- 1974–1975: Zandvoort Lions
- 1976–1978: Leiden

Career highlights
- DBL champion (1978); DBL All-Defensive Team (1977); DBL All-Star (1975)
- Stats at NBA.com
- Stats at Basketball Reference

Victor Hayden Bartolome (born September 29, 1948) is an American former professional basketball player. He played in college at the Oregon State University, and was drafted in the sixth round of the 1970 NBA draft by the Golden State Warriors. He played in 38 games for the Warriors through the 1971–72 season. He then played professional basketball in Livorno, Italy and on various teams in the Netherlands until retiring in 1979, after winning the Dutch national championship with Leiden.

== Career statistics ==
Legend
GP	Games played	GS	Games started	MPG	Minutes per game
FG%	Field goal percentage	3P%	3-point field goal percentage	FT%	Free throw percentage
RPG	Rebounds per game	APG	Assists per game	SPG	Steals per game
BPG	Blocks per game	PPG	Points per game	**Bold**	Career high

=== NBA ===
==== Regular season ====
Year	Team	GP	MPG	FG%	FT%	RPG	APG	PPG
1971–72	Golden State	38	4.3	.254	.800	1.6	.1	.9
