= Netherlands men's national basketball team =

Men's national basketball team representing the Netherlands

Netherlands
- FIBA ranking: 53 ▼1 (1 September 2026)
- Joined FIBA: 1946
- FIBA zone: FIBA Europe
- National federation: Basketball Nederland
- Coach: Johan Roijakkers
- Nickname: Oranje (Orange)

FIBA World Cup
- Appearances: 1 (1986)
- Medals: None

EuroBasket
- Appearances: 16
- Medals: None
Home	Away

First international
- Netherlands 48–27 England (Geneva, Switzerland; 30 April 1946)

Biggest win
- Netherlands 134–54 Morocco (Hagen, West Germany; 15 May 1975)

Biggest defeat
- Czechoslovakia 93–19 Netherlands (Prague, Czechoslovakia; 27 April 1947)

The Netherlands men's national basketball team (Dutch: Het Nederlands nationaal basketbalteam) represents the Netherlands in international basketball matches. The national team is governed by Basketball Nederland.

The Dutch have reached the European Basketball Championship on 16 occasions. Their best results at the event came in 1983, where they finished in fourth place. They have also qualified for the FIBA World Cup once, in 1986. However, in recent years the national team has struggled to maintain consistency to reach major international tournaments.

The team represents itself as the Orange Lions.

== History ==
=== 1946–1991: Early years ===
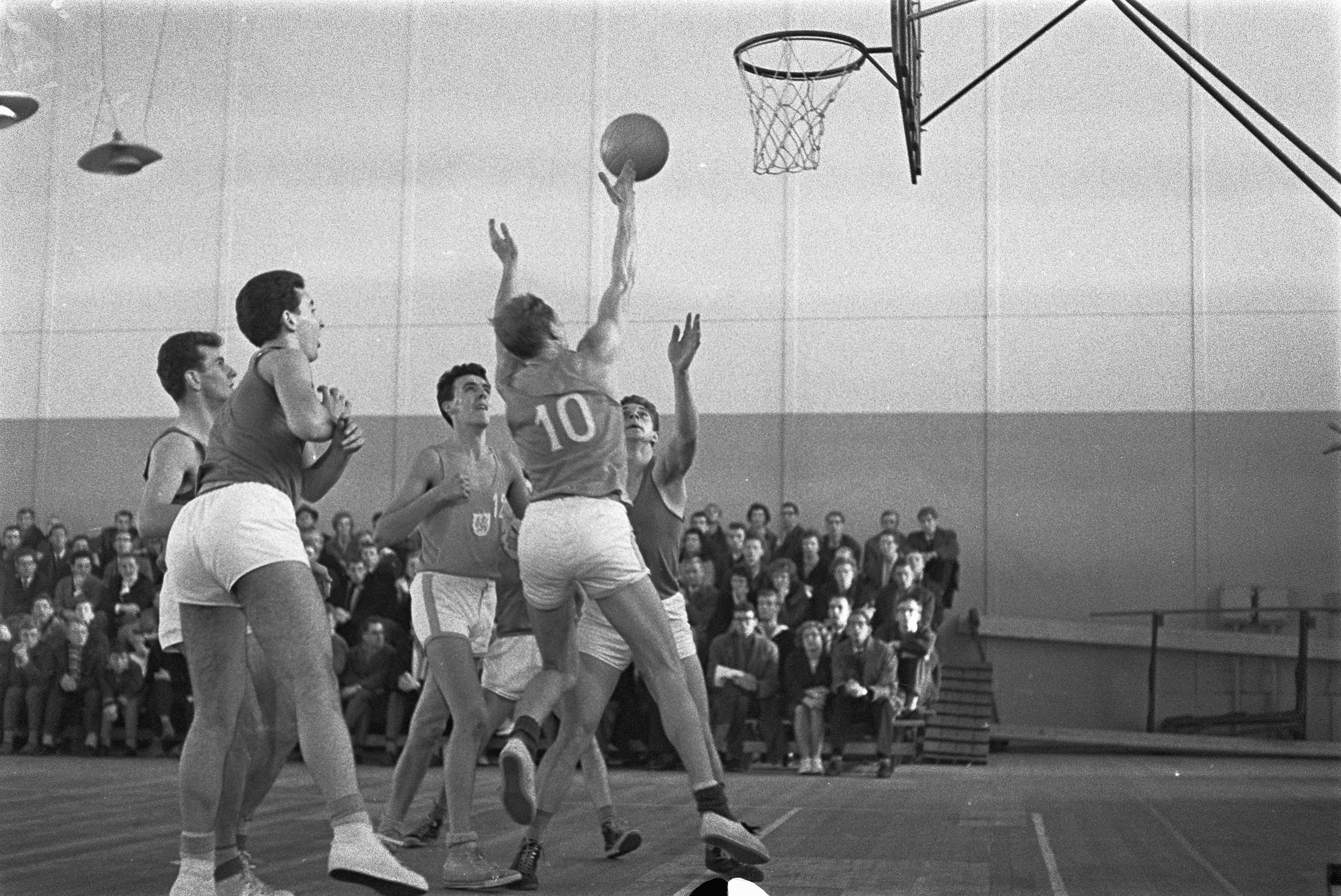
The Netherlands playing a match against Luxembourg in 1959

The Netherlands were one of the teams that played in the 1946, 1947, 1949 and 1951 EuroBasket tournaments. During this period, the 5th place finish in 1949 was the best performance by the national team.

=== 1961–1991: EuroBasket success & World Cup debut ===
The Oranje qualified for three European Basketball Championships in the 1960s (1961, 1963, 1967). After three consecutive missed tournaments, the Netherlands had another three EuroBasket appearance stretch from 1975, 1977, and 1979. During the 1977 EuroBasket, the Netherlands' star player Kees Akerboom shined during the tournament. He finished the competition as the top scorer, and earned a spot on the All-Tournament Team.

At EuroBasket 1983, the Dutch had its biggest success in history under head coach Vladimir Heger. The national team achieved fourth place at the tournament. The Dutch wound up reaching the semi-finals, but eventually fell to Italy. In the third-place game they would lose again, this time to the Soviet Union.

Three years after achieving success at the continental level, the Netherlands qualified to the World Cup for the first time in 1986. The national team ultimately did not make it out of the group stage though, finishing the tournament with an (2–3) record to place 14th overall.

=== 1991–2012: Long mediocre period ===
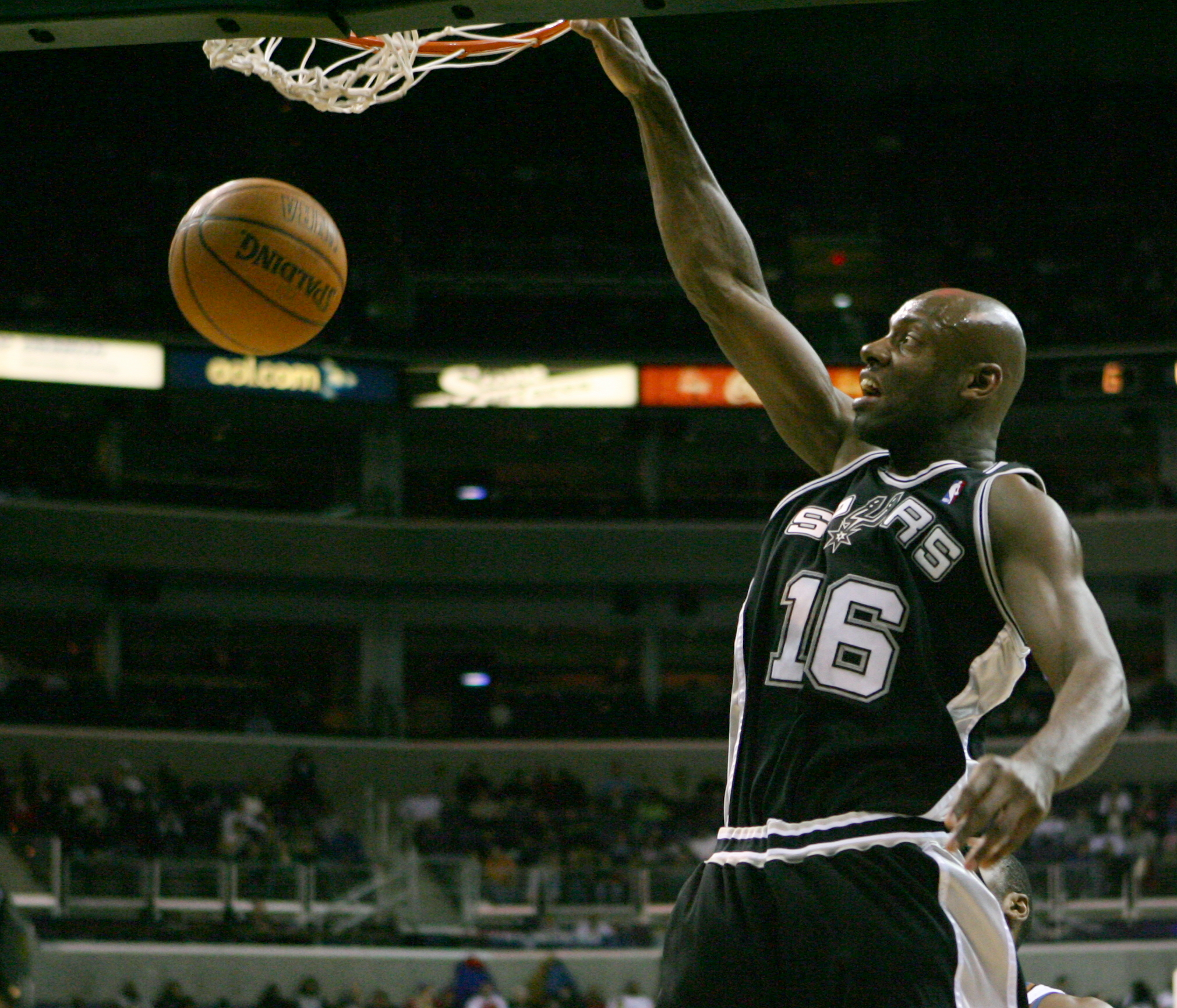
Francisco Elson was the face of the team for a long time

From 1991 until 2012, the Netherlands did not qualify for a EuroBasket tournament. Star player Francisco Elson, former NBA-champion, represented the team on several occasions but the team never came close to qualifying. During this period, notable Dutch players like Dan Gadzuric were not willing to play for the national team. Home games were usually played at the Topsportcentrum in Almere and usually had little to no media attention or fan support in the Netherlands.

=== Rising from the ashes (2012–2015) ===
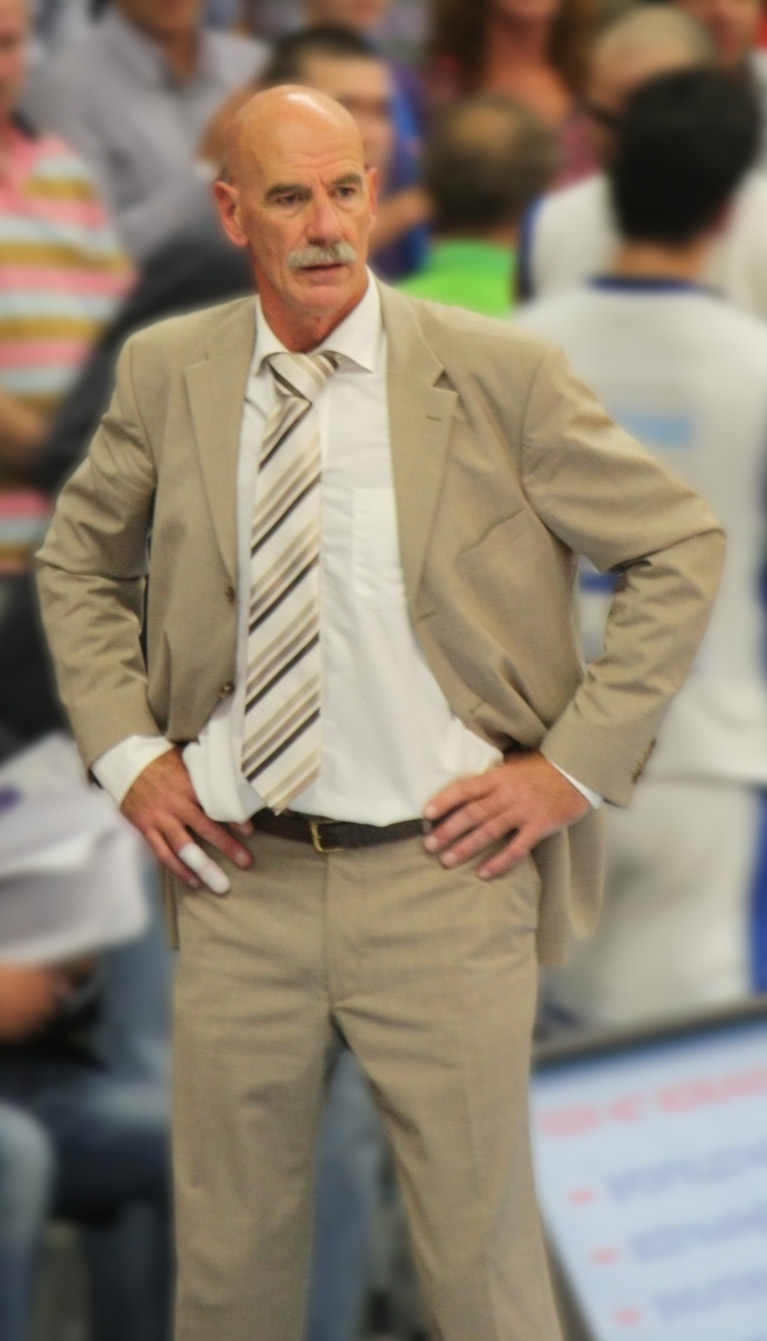
Toon van Helfteren coached the national team to its first EuroBasket tournament in 26 years

In December 2012, it was announced that the Netherlands national team would be dissolved for 2 years, because the national federation NBB {Netherlands Basketball Bond} was not willing to invest money in to it. After a campaign by Dutch players who played in the Dutch Basketball League, the national team was eventually saved. Sports broadcaster Sport1 became the main sponsor and DBL-teams invested in the team, which started playing again.

During August 2013, the Netherlands was on its way to qualification for EuroBasket 2015, but lost two games 20–0 because the team played with two players – Mohamed Kherrazi and Sean Cunningham – who were identified as foreign players by FIBA. The NBB believed that both were eligible players, and was upset that the attention came up after the Netherlands already won 2 games.

=== "Miracle of 2014" ===
Logo used from 2012 to 2019

At the start of the second 2015-qualification round, things looked bad for the Oranje. The DBL-teams didn't have any more money to invest in the team and the NBB wasn't ready to take the team back. Head coach Toon van Helfteren, who worked as a volunteer, still did prepare for the qualifying games. He invited 42 players to play for the national team, but after most (notable) players rejected the offer, he started his first training camp with 7 players. The team eventually shocked the world, by beating heavy favorite Montenegro to get the second place in their group. On 27 August 2014, the Dutch national team qualified for EuroBasket for the first time in 25 years.

=== Return to EuroBasket (2015–present) ===
The national team left the NBB and FEB, from 2015 the team was run by the NMT. Coach Van Helfteren then had his contract with the national team extended. In contrast to the summer of 2014, big name players from foreign leagues applied to play for the national team.

In the first game at EuroBasket 2015, the Dutch beat Georgia 73–72 behind Charlon Kloof's 22 and Worthy de Jong's 16 points. The Netherlands remaining four games though were all loses, but only by single digits to power houses such as Croatia and Greece.

On 22 July 2019, Italian coach Maurizio Buscaglia signed on to become head coach of the Netherlands, replacing Toon van Helfteren who stepped down. After a disappointing EuroBasket 2022, in which the Netherlands went winless, Buscaglia was sacked. On 6 October 2022, Radenko Varagić was appointed as interim head coach for the remaining World Cup qualifying campaign.

On 23 May 2023, the Netherlands named Israeli coach Arik Shivek as head coach of the national team. He previously led at the international level for five years with Israel from 2009 to 2014. Two years later, after failing to qualify for EuroBasket 2025, Shivek was replaced as national team head coach with Dutch coach Johan Roijakkers.

== Competitive record ==
=== FIBA World Cup ===
World Cup					Qualification		
Year	Position	Pld	W	L	Pld	W	L
(Argentina) 1950	Did not qualify				5	1	4
(Brazil) 1954	Did not enter				Did not enter		
(Chile) 1959	Did not enter				Did not enter		
(Brazil) 1963	Did not qualify				EuroBasket served as qualifiers		
(Uruguay) 1967	Did not qualify				EuroBasket served as qualifiers		
(Socialist Federal Republic of Yugoslavia) 1970	Did not qualify				EuroBasket served as qualifiers		
(Puerto Rico) 1974	Did not qualify				EuroBasket served as qualifiers		
(Philippines) 1978	Did not qualify				EuroBasket served as qualifiers		
(Colombia) 1982	Did not qualify				EuroBasket served as qualifiers		
(Spain) 1986	14th	5	2	3	6	4	2
(Argentina) 1990	Did not qualify				EuroBasket served as qualifiers		
(Canada) 1994	Did not qualify				EuroBasket served as qualifiers		
(Greece) 1998	Did not qualify				EuroBasket served as qualifiers		
(United States) 2002	Did not qualify				EuroBasket served as qualifiers		
(Japan) 2006	Did not qualify				EuroBasket served as qualifiers		
(Turkey) 2010	Did not qualify				EuroBasket served as qualifiers		
(Spain) 2014	Did not qualify				EuroBasket served as qualifiers		
(China) 2019	Did not qualify				16	6	10
(Philippines) (Japan) (Indonesia) 2023	Did not qualify				10	0	10
(Qatar) 2027	To be determined				In progress		
(France) 2031	To be determined				To be determined		
Total	1/19	5	2	3	37	11	26

=== Olympic Games ===
Olympic Games					Qualifying		
Year	Position	Pld	W	L	Pld	W	L
(Nazi Germany) 1936	No national representative						
(United Kingdom) 1948	Did not enter						
(Finland) 1952	Did not enter						
(Australia) 1956	Did not enter						
(Italy) 1960	Did not qualify				7	5	2
(Japan) 1964	Did not qualify				8	2	6
(Mexico) 1968	Did not qualify				8	1	7
(West Germany) 1972	Did not qualify				9	5	4
(Canada) 1976	Did not qualify				9	4	5
(Soviet Union) 1980	Did not qualify				3	1	2
(United States) 1984	Did not qualify				3	1	2
(South Korea) 1988	Did not qualify				4	2	2
(Spain) 1992	Did not qualify				5	2	3
(United States) 1996	Did not qualify				Did not qualify		
(Australia) 2000	Did not qualify				Did not qualify		
(Greece) 2004	Did not qualify				Did not qualify		
(China) 2008	Did not qualify				Did not qualify		
(United Kingdom) 2012	Did not qualify				Did not qualify		
(Brazil) 2016	Did not qualify				Did not qualify		
(Japan) 2020	Did not qualify				Did not qualify		
(France) 2024	Did not qualify				3	1	2
(United States) 2028	To be determined				To be determined		
Total	0/20				59	24	35

=== EuroBasket ===
EuroBasket					Qualification		
Year	Position	Pld	W	L	Pld	W	L
(Switzerland) 1935	No national representative						
(Latvia) 1937	No national representative						
(Lithuania) 1939	No national representative						
(Switzerland) 1946	6th	3	1	2			
(Czechoslovakia) 1947	11th	6	2	4			
(Egypt) 1949	5th	6	2	4			
(France) 1951	10th	9	6	3			
(Soviet Union) 1953	Did not enter						
(Hungary) 1955	Did not enter						
(Bulgaria) 1957	Did not enter						
(Turkey) 1959	Did not enter						
(Socialist Federal Republic of Yugoslavia) 1961	15th	6	3	3			
(Poland) 1963	16th	9	1	8	1	1	0
(Soviet Union) 1965	Did not qualify				3	1	2
(Finland) 1967	16th	9	0	9	3	3	0
(Italy) 1969	Did not qualify				4	2	2
(West Germany) 1971	Did not qualify				3	0	3
(Spain) 1973	Did not qualify				6	4	2
(Socialist Federal Republic of Yugoslavia) 1975	10th	7	2	5	9	7	2
(Belgium) 1977	7th	7	3	4	8	7	1
(Italy) 1979	10th	7	3	4	Directly qualified		
(Czechoslovakia) 1981	Did not qualify				8	4	4
(France) 1983	4th	7	3	4	9	9	0
(West Germany) 1985	12th	7	1	6	Directly qualified		
(Greece) 1987	10th	7	2	5	9	6	3
(Socialist Federal Republic of Yugoslavia) 1989	8th	5	0	5	10	7	3
(Italy) 1991	Did not qualify				6	2	4
(Germany) 1993	Did not qualify				6	2	4
(Greece) 1995	Did not qualify				5	3	2
(Spain) 1997	Did not qualify				15	7	8
(France) 1999	Did not qualify				13	6	7
(Turkey) 2001	Did not qualify				13	7	6
(Sweden) 2003	Did not qualify				10	0	10
(Serbia and Montenegro) 2005	Did not qualify				12	2	10
(Spain) 2007	Division B				8	5	3
(Poland) 2009	Division B				8	5	3
(Lithuania) 2011	Division B				6	4	2
(Slovenia) 2013	Did not qualify				8	2	6
(France) (Croatia) (Germany) (Latvia) 2015	21st	5	1	4	9	5	4
(Finland) (Israel) (Romania) (Turkey) 2017	Did not qualify				6	4	2
(Czech Republic) (Georgia (country)) (Italy) (Germany) 2022	22nd	5	0	5	6	3	3
(Cyprus) (Finland) (Poland) (Latvia) 2025	Did not qualify				6	1	5
(Estonia) (Greece) (Slovenia) (Spain) 2029	To be determined				To be determined		
Total	16/39	105	30	75	210	109	101

== Results and fixtures ==
Win Loss

=== 2025 ===
2 August 2025 2027 FIBA World Cup pre-qualifiers – 2nd round	Netherlands	65–64	Austria	The Hague, Netherlands
14:30 CEST (UTC+2)	Scoring by quarter: 21–12, 13–23, 18–14, 13–15
	Pts: Enaruna 11; Rebs: Enaruna 7 Asts: Van der Vuurst, Ververs 4	Boxscore	Pts: Pöltl 16; Rebs: Pöltl 11; Asts: Güttl 3	Arena: Sportcampus Zuiderpark; Attendance: 2,555; Referees: Mārtiņš Kozlovskis (LAT), Julio Anaya (PAN), Ilias Kounellis (CYP)

9 August 2025 2027 FIBA World Cup pre-qualifiers – 2nd round	Bulgaria	70–81	Netherlands	Samokov, Bulgaria
18:00 EEST (UTC+3)	Scoring by quarter: 15–22, 17–22, 21–18, 17–19
	Pts: Stoimenov 18; Rebs: Minchev 6 Asts: Dimitrov 4	Boxscore	Pts: D. N'Guessan 24; Rebs: D. N'Guessan 11; Asts: Van der Vuurst 6	Arena: Arena Samokov; Attendance: 2,500; Referees: Marius Ciulin (ROU), Yener Yılmaz (TUR), Dariusz Zapolski (POL)

13 August 2025 2027 FIBA World Cup pre-qualifiers – 2nd round	Austria	83–70	Netherlands	Schwechat, Austria
19:20 CEST (UTC+2)	Scoring by quarter: 19–10, 20–21, 30–17, 14–22
	Pts: Landesberg 14; Rebs: Pöltl 6 Asts: Friedrich 7	Boxscore	Pts: Leons 15; Rebs: Leons 8 Asts: Ververs 6	Arena: Multiversum; Attendance: 3,000; Referees: Ademir Zurapović (BIH), Paulo Marques (POR), Igor Mitrovski (MKD)

20 August 2025 2027 FIBA World Cup pre-qualifiers – 2nd round	Netherlands	97–70	Bulgaria	Almere, Netherlands
19:30 CEST (UTC+2)	Scoring by quarter: 25–29, 26–12, 16–14, 30–15
	Pts: Van der Vuurst 22; Rebs: L. N'Guessan 9 Asts: Van der Vuurst 13	Boxscore	Pts: Alipiev 15; Rebs: Stoilov 6 Asts: Alipiev 4	Arena: Topsportcentrum; Attendance: 1,598; Referees: Luis Castillo (ESP), Carsten Straube (GER), Viola Györgyi (NOR)

28 November 2025 2027 FIBA World Cup qualifiers – 1st round	Latvia	78–86	Netherlands	Riga, Latvia
19:30 EET (UTC+2)	Scoring by quarter: 12–26, 17–22, 21–17, 28–21
	Pts: Lomažs 17; Rebs: Mejeris 6 Asts: Lomažs, Mejeris 5	Boxscore	Pts: Kuta 17; Rebs: Kruithof 6 Asts: Van der Vuurst 8	Arena: Xiaomi Arena; Attendance: 9,068; Referees: Petar Pešić (SRB), Ilias Kounellis (CYP), Ioannis Tsibouris (GRE)

1 December 2025 2027 FIBA World Cup qualifiers – 1st round	Netherlands	83–85	Poland	The Hague, Netherlands
19:30 CET (UTC+1)	Scoring by quarter: 28–22, 25–15, 17–21, 13–27
	Pts: Franke 26; Rebs: Franke 6 Asts: Van der Vuurst 6	Boxscore	Pts: Ponitka 22; Rebs: Ponitka 9 Asts: Łączyński, Ponitka 4	Arena: Sportcampus Zuiderpark; Attendance: 3,370; Referees: Martin Vulić (CRO), Alberto Sánchez (ESP), Orhan Hekimoğlu (TUR)

=== 2026 ===
27 February 2026 2027 FIBA World Cup qualifiers – 1st round	Austria	71–81	Netherlands	Vienna, Austria
18:00 CET (UTC+1)	Scoring by quarter: 13–17, 21–23, 19–15, 18–26
	Pts: Vujošević 23; Rebs: Schott 15; Asts: Vujošević 6	Boxscore	Pts: Van der Vuurst 25; Rebs: D. N'Guessan 13; Asts: Van der Vuurst 6	Arena: Sport Arena Wien; Attendance: 1,000; Referees: Geert Jacobs (BEL), Çisil Güngör (TUR), Andrea Bongiorni (ITA)

1 March 2026 2027 FIBA World Cup qualifiers – 1st round	Netherlands	87–88	Austria	The Hague, Netherlands
14:30 CET (UTC+1)	Scoring by quarter: 23–18, 27–25, 17–18, 20–27
	Pts: Franke, Van der Vuurst 17; Rebs: Kruithof 10; Asts: Van der Vuurst, Ververs 5	Boxscore	Pts: Schott 19; Rebs: Schott 11; Asts: Vujošević 13	Arena: Sportcampus Zuiderpark; Attendance: 3,455; Referees: Zafer Yılmaz (TUR), Alberto Sánchez (ESP), Blaž Zupančič (SVN)

3 July 2026 2027 FIBA World Cup qualifiers – 1st round	Netherlands	69–72	Latvia	Almere, Netherlands
19:30 CEST (UTC+2)	Scoring by quarter: 26–18, 7–23, 21–11, 15–20
	Pts: Van der Vuurst 23; Rebs: Van der Vuurst 8 Asts: Van der Vuurst 5	Boxscore	Pts: Lomažs, Žagars 21; Rebs: Čavars, Strautiņš 7 Asts: Lomažs 4	Arena: Topsportcentrum; Attendance: 3,118; Referees: Ademir Zurapović (BIH), Marius Ciulin (ROU), Roko Hordov (CRO)

6 July 2026 2027 FIBA World Cup qualifiers – 1st round	Poland	92–84	Netherlands	Kraków, Poland
18:00 CEST (UTC+2)	Scoring by quarter: 18–16, 28–28, 27–21, 19–19
	Pts: Łączyński 18; Rebs: Olejniczak 9 Asts: Łączyński 5	Boxscore	Pts: Van der Vuurst 26; Rebs: Kuta 7 Asts: Van der Vuurst 9	Arena: Arena Kraków; Attendance: 8,110; Referees: Gintaras Mačiulis (LTU), Zdenko Tomašević (SVK), Ilias Karapanos (GRE)

27 August 2026 2027 FIBA World Cup qualifiers – 2nd round	Germany	99–83	Netherlands	Cologne, Germany
20:00 CEST (UTC+2)	Scoring by quarter: 38–31, 26–19, 18–16, 17–17
	Pts: Schröder 23; Rebs: Olinde 7 Asts: Schröder 6	Boxscore	Pts: Franke 24; Rebs: D. N'Guessan 6 Asts: Van der Vuurst 6	Arena: Lanxess Arena; Attendance: 15,309; Referees: Gvidas Gedvilas (LTU), Yener Yılmaz (TUR), Geert Jacobs (BEL)

30 August 2026 2027 FIBA World Cup qualifiers – 2nd round	Netherlands	99–101	Croatia	Almere, Netherlands
14:30 CEST (UTC+2)	Scoring by quarter: 31–22, 27–22, 19–32, 22–25
	Pts: Van der Vuurst 23; Rebs: Franke, Mast 6 Asts: Van der Vuurst 5	Boxscore	Pts: Šarić, Zubac 24; Rebs: Zubac 11; Asts: Šarić, Smith 6	Arena: Topsportcentrum; Attendance: 3,108; Referees: Paulo Marques (POR), Fernando Calatrava (ESP), Tolga Edis (TUR)

27 November 2026 2027 FIBA World Cup qualifiers – 2nd round	Netherlands	vs.	Israel	The Hague, Netherlands
20:00 CET (UTC+1)
		Boxscore		Arena: Sportcampus Zuiderpark

30 November 2026 2027 FIBA World Cup qualifiers – 2nd round	Croatia	vs.	Netherlands	Zagreb, Croatia
20:00 CET (UTC+1)
		Boxscore		Arena: Dražen Petrović Basketball Hall

=== 2027 ===
25 February 2027 2027 FIBA World Cup qualifiers – 2nd round	Netherlands	vs.	Germany	Netherlands
--:-- CET (UTC+1)
		Boxscore

28 February 2027 2027 FIBA World Cup qualifiers – 2nd round	Israel	vs.	Netherlands	Israel
--:-- (UTC+2)
		Boxscore

== Team ==
=== Current roster ===
Roster for the 2027 FIBA World Cup Qualifiers matches on 27 and 30 August 2026 against Germany and Croatia.

Netherlands men's national basketball team roster
Players
Coaches

Pos.	No.	Name	Age – Date of birth	Height	Club	Ctr.
SG	0	Yannick Franke	30 – 21 May 1996	1.85 m (6 ft 1 in)	Neptūnas	(Lithuania)
PG	1	Keye van der Vuurst	24 – 29 December 2001	1.91 m (6 ft 3 in)	Joventut	(Spain)
PF	3	David N'Guessan	26 – 12 June 2000	2.06 m (6 ft 9 in)	Braunschweig	(Germany)
SG	6	Sander Hollanders	24 – 13 September 2001	1.94 m (6 ft 4 in)	Oviedo	(Spain)
G	7	Marijn Ververs	27 – 17 September 1998	1.94 m (6 ft 4 in)	Limburg United	(Belgium)
C	9	Anton Bonke	22 – 4 August 2004	2.18 m (7 ft 2 in)	Michigan State Spartans	(United States)
G/F	12	Yannick Kraag	23 – 16 October 2002	2.02 m (6 ft 8 in)	Joventut	(Spain)
G/F	16	Troy Koehler	25 – 30 July 2001	1.94 m (6 ft 4 in)	Kortrijk Spurs	(Belgium)
SF	22	Lucas Kruithof	26 – 17 July 2000	2.01 m (6 ft 7 in)	Leiden	(Netherlands)
SG	32	Kjeld Zuidema	25 – 21 June 2001	1.94 m (6 ft 4 in)	Donar	(Netherlands)
F/C	51	Rienk Mast	25 – 19 July 2001	2.08 m (6 ft 10 in)	Free agent
PG	90	Charlon Kloof	36 – 20 March 1990	1.85 m (6 ft 1 in)	Den Bosch	(Netherlands)
PF	99	Nathan Kuta	26 – 28 April 2000	2.04 m (6 ft 8 in)	Orléans	(France)

Head coach

- (Netherlands) Johan Roijakkers

Assistant coach(es)

- (Germany) / (Iran) Sepehr Tarrah
- (Netherlands) Roberto Oosterwolde

Legend

- (C) Team captain
- Club – describes last
  club before the competition
- Age – describes age
  on 27 August 2026

=== Depth chart ===
Pos.	Starting 5	Bench 1	Bench 2
C	Nathan Kuta	David N'Guessan	Lucas N'Guessan
PF	Lucas Kruithof	Coen Stolk
SF	Troy Koehler	Sander Hollanders	Stan van den Elzen
SG	Yannick Franke	Leon Williams
PG	Keye van der Vuurst	Marijn Ververs

== List of head coaches ==
As of 30 August 2026

No.	Name	Nationality	From	To	Games coached	Wins	Losses	Winning percentage	Notes
1	Dick Schmüll	Netherlands	31 March 1946	1 May 1951	39	15	24	.385	
2	Freek Brandt	Netherlands	1 March 1952	1 April 1952	3	1	2	.333	
3	Gerrit den Boef	Netherlands	1 November 1952	1 April 1953	3	1	2	.333	
4	Wim van Someren	Netherlands	1 September 1953	1 September 1955	3	0	3	.000	
5	Joop Koper	Netherlands	1 March 1955	31 January 1957	3	0	3	.000	
6	Tan Eng Hau	Netherlands	27 October 1956	27 October 1956	1	0	1	.000	Interim replacement.
7	Nico van Pelt	Netherlands	1 November 1957	1 November 1957	1	0	1	1.000	Interim replacement.
8	Henk Aldenberg	Netherlands	1 March 1959	1 May 1959	10	2	8	.200	
9	Cees Burgert	Netherlands	5 March 1960	2 October 1965	5	1	4	.200	
10	Jan Janbroers	Netherlands	1 April 1960	1 November 1965					
11	Egon Steuer	Czechoslovakia	1 September 1966	1 July 1970	54	18	36	.333	Steuer was the first ever foreign coach.
12	Harry Kippers	Netherlands	1 October 1970	1 May 1971	10	4	6	.400	
13	René Mol	Belgium	1 May 1971	1 May 1973	31	17	14	.548	
14	Jan Bruin	Netherlands	1 May 1974	1 May 1974	1	1	0	1.000	
15	Bill Sheridan	United States	1 October 1974	1 July 1976	56	33	23	.589	
16	Jan Janbroers	Netherlands	1 January 1977	1 September 1977					
17	Tom Quinn	United States	1 May 1978	1 June 1979	30	20	10	.667	
18	Jan Sikking	Netherlands	1 April 1980	1 May 1980	11	3	8	.273	
19	Ton Boot	Netherlands	1 February 1981	1 May 1981	10	5	5	.500	
20	Ruud Harrewijn	Netherlands	1 July 1982	1 August 1982					
21	Vladimir Heger	Czechoslovakia	1 April 1982	1 June 1986	82	44	38	.537	
22	Ruud Harrewijn	Netherlands	1 June 1986	30 June 1991					
23	Randy Wiel	Territory of Curaçao	1 June 1991	1 June 1993	26	9	17	.346	
24	Toon van Helfteren	Netherlands	1 September 1993	1 June 1997	44	24	20	.545	
25	Lucien Van Kersschaever	Belgium	1 June 1997	1 May 1999	26	7	19	.269	
26	Bob Gonnen	United States	1 September 1999	1 February 2000	5	1	4	.200	
27	Maarten van Gent	Netherlands	4 August 2000	1 January 2003	21	5	16	.238	
28	Glenn Pinas	Suriname	1 January 2004	14 April 2006	26	5	21	.192	
29	Marco van den Berg	Netherlands	24 May 2006	4 February 2008	13	8	5	.615	
30	Gadi Kedar	Israel	13 May 2008	20 April 2012	43	25	18	.581	
31	Jan Willem Jansen	Netherlands	25 June 2012	2013	15	6	9	.400	
32	Toon van Helfteren	Netherlands	6 March 2013	25 February 2019	87	28	59	.322	Coached at EuroBasket 2015.
33	Maurizio Buscaglia	Italy	22 July 2019	10 September 2022	25	3	22	.120	Coached at EuroBasket 2022.
34	Radenko Varagić	Serbia	6 October 2022	26 February 2023	4	0	4	.000	Interim replacement.
35	Arik Shivek	Israel	23 May 2023	24 February 2025	17	6	11	.353	
36	Johan Roijakkers	Netherlands	10 June 2025	present	18	6	12	.333	

== Past rosters ==
1946 EuroBasket: finished 6th among 10 teams

3 Chris van Laar, 4 Joop Koper, 5 Henk Mik, 6 Wim van Someren, 7 Freek Brandt, 8 Jan Aldenberg, 9 Henk Koper, 13 Chris Kugelein, 14 Wim Kunnen, 15 Ben Gerritsma (Coach: Dick Schmüll)

1947 EuroBasket: finished 11th among 14 teams

3 Joop Koper, 4 Chris van Laar, 5 Freek Brandt, 6 Jaap van Veen, 7 Wim van Someren, 8 B Winkel, 9 Tan Eng Hau, 10 Henk Koper, 20 Visser (Coach: Dick Schmüll)

1949 EuroBasket: finished 5th among 7 teams

3 Jaap van Veen, 4 Jaap van Veen, 5 Tom Losekoot, 6 Tan Eng Hau, 7 Henk Koper, 8 Joop Koper, 9 Wim van Someren, 10 Henk van de Broek, 11 Jan Hille, 20 Freek Brandt (Coach: Dick Schmüll)

1951 EuroBasket: finished 10th among 17 teams

3 Tim de Jong, 4 Johan de Hoop, 5 Bob van der Valk, 6 Ab Gootjes, 7 Jaap van Veen, 8 Henk van de Broek, 9 Vok Alberda, 10 Kees van der Schuijt, 11 Jan Hille, 12 Piet Ouderland, 13 Ton Koemans, 14 Rinus van Eijkeren (Coach: Dick Schmüll)

1961 EuroBasket: finished 15th among 19 teams

4 Henny Braun, 5 Antonie Boot, 6 Jan Bruin, 7 Jan Driehuis, 8 Dolf Pouw, 9 Wim Franke, 10 Maarten Sleeswijk, 11 Gerrit Kok, 12 Peter de Jong, 13 Gunter van de Berg, 14 Franciscus de Haan, 15 Hans Perrier (Coach: Jan Janbroers)

1963 EuroBasket: finished 16th among 16 teams

4 Jos Pelk, 5 Antonie Boot, 6 Jan Bruin, 7 Jan Driehuis, 8 Simon Schagen, 9 Bob Grosmann, 10 Wim Franke, 11 Gerrit Kok, 12 Roelof Tuinstra, 13 Jan Schappert, 14 Franciscus de Haan, 15 Frederik Witte (Coach: Jan Janbroers)

1967 EuroBasket: finished 16th among 16 teams

4 Petrus Rijsewik, 5 Antonie Boot, 6 Jan Bruin, 7 Frank Kales, 8 Antonius van der Kroon, 9 Karel Pastor, 10 Karel Vrolijk, 11 Erik Jager, 12 Roelof Tuinstra, 13 Erik van Woerkom, 14 Franciscus de Haan, 15 Frederik Witte (Coach: Egon Steuer)

1975 EuroBasket: finished 10th among 12 teams

4 Jan Dekker, 5 Antonie Boot, 6 Jan Sikking, 7 Hugo Harrewijn, 8 Herman Pluim, 9 Walter Ombre, 10 John van Vliet, 11 Kees Akerboom, 12 Dan Cramer, 13 Toon van Helfteren, 14 Pieter van Tuyll, 15 Harry Kip (Coach: Bill Sheridan)

1977 EuroBasket: finished 7th among 12 teams

4 Al Faber, 5 Jan Dekker, 6 Jimmy Woudstra, 7 Cees Limmen, 8 Emill Hagens, 9 Bert Kragtwijk, 10 Cock van de Lagemaat, 11 Dan Cramer, 12 Kees Akerboom, 13 Jan Loorbach, 14 Renso Zwiers, 15 Harry Kip (Coach: Jan Janbroers)

1979 EuroBasket: finished 10th among 12 teams

4 Bert Kragtwijk, 5 Jan Dekker, 6 Dan Cramer, 7 Mitchell Plaat, 8 Emill Hagens, 9 Al Faber, 10 Sid Bruinsma, 11 Jimmy Woudstra, 12 Kees Akerboom, 13 Toon van Helfteren, 14 Pieter van Tuyll, 15 Harry Kip (Coach: Tom Quinn)

1983 EuroBasket: finished 4th among 12 teams

4 René Ridderhof, 5 Ronald Schilp, 6 Randy Wiel, 7 Mitchell Plaat, 8 Jelle Esveldt, 9 Al Faber, 10 Jos Kuipers, 11 Dan Cramer, 12 Cock van de Lagemaat, 13 Henk Pieterse, 14 Roland van den Bergh, 15 Rob van Essen (Coach: Vladimír Heger)

1985 EuroBasket: finished 12th among 12 teams

4 Martin Esajas, 5 Ronald Schilp, 6 Martin de Vries, 7 Marco de Waard, 8 Jelle Esveldt, 9 Ron van der Schaaf, 10 John Franken, 11 Cock van de Lagemaat, 12 Jos Kuipers, 13 Peter van Noord, 14 Hans Heijdeman, 15 Rob van Essen (Coach: Vladimír Heger)

1986 FIBA World Cup: finished 14th among 24 teams

4 Rik Smits, 5 Jelle Esveldt, 6 Ronald Schilp, 7 Cock van de Lagemaat, 8 Raymond Bottse, 9 Rene Ebeltjes, 10 Chris van Dinten, 11 Hans Heijdeman, 12 Erik Griekspoor, 13 Emill Hagens, 14 Marco de Waard, 15 Peter van Noord (Coach: Ruud Harrewijn)

1987 EuroBasket: finished 10th among 12 teams

4 John Emanuels, 5 Ronald Schilp, 6 Marco de Waard, 7 Cees van Rootselaar, 8 Jelle Esveldt, 9 Okke te Velde, 10 Rik Smits, 11 Chris van Dinten, 12 Peter van Noord, 13 Toon van Helfteren, 14 Henk Pieterse, 15 Jos Kuipers (Coach: Ruud Harrewijn)

1989 EuroBasket: finished 8th among 8 teams

4 Raymond Bottse, 5 John Emanuels, 6 Marco de Waard, 7 Cees van Rootselaar, 8 Rolf Franke, 9 Okke te Velde, 10 Richard van Poelgeest, 11 Frans Houben, 12 Milko Lieverst, 13 Paul Vrind, 14 Peter Dam, 15 Jos Kuipers (Coach: Ruud Harrewijn)

2015 EuroBasket: finished 21st among 24 teams

0 Yannick Franke, 5 Leon Williams, 6 Worthy de Jong, 7 Charlon Kloof, 9 Mohamed Kherrazi, 10 Ralf de Pagter, 12 Kees Akerboom, Jr., 13 Roeland Schaftenaar, 18 Nicolas de Jong, 21 Robin Smeulders, 23 Henk Norel, 44 Arvin Slagter (C) (Coach: Toon van Helfteren)

2022 EuroBasket: finished 22nd among 24 teams

0 Yannick Franke, 1 Keye van der Vuurst de Vries, 5 Leon Williams, 6 Worthy de Jong (C), 9 Mohamed Kherrazi, 11 Shane Hammink,
13 Roeland Schaftenaar, 14 Jesse Edwards, 30 Olaf Schaftenaar, 32 Matt Haarms, 33 Jito Kok, 90 Charlon Kloof
(Coach: Maurizio Buscaglia)

== See also ==
- Sport in the Netherlands
- Netherlands women's national basketball team
- Netherlands men's national under-20 basketball team
- Netherlands men's national under-18 basketball team
- Netherlands men's national under-16 basketball team
