= Owen Wells (basketball) =

American basketball player (1950–1993)

Personal information
- Born: December 9, 1950 Providence, Rhode Island, U.S.
- Died: April 27, 1993 (aged 42)
- Listed height: 6 ft 7 in (2.01 m)
- Listed weight: 200 lb (91 kg)

Career information
- High school: English (Boston, Massachusetts)
- College: Detroit Mercy (1971–1974)
- NBA draft: 1974: 5th round, 77th overall pick
- Drafted by: Houston Rockets
- Playing career: 1974–1985
- Position: Small forward
- Number: 30

Career history
- 1974–1975: Houston Rockets
- 1975–1978: Kinzo Amstelveen
- 1978–1979: Sinudyne Bologna
- 1979–1980: Kinzo Amstelveen
- 1980–1981: Newcastle Falcons
- 1982–1983: Sydney SuperSonics
- 1984–1985: Tampa Bay Thrillers
- 1985: Rhode Island Gulls

Career highlights
- Serie A champion (1979); NBL Most Valuable Player (1983); All-NBL Team (1981); 2× First-team All-Eredivisie (1976, 1980)
- Stats at NBA.com
- Stats at Basketball Reference

Owen Wells (December 9, 1950 – April 27, 1993) was an American professional basketball player. A 6'7" forward, he attended the University of Detroit Mercy and went to English High School in Boston, Massachusetts. Wells played 33 games for the Houston Rockets during the 1974-75 NBA season, averaging 3.0 points per game. He was a fifth round pick in the 1974 NBA Draft.

Wells also had a stint in Australia's National Basketball League with the Sydney Supersonics, during which time he won the NBL Most Valuable Player award in 1983.

Wells died in 1993 after suffering a stroke.

== Career statistics ==
Legend
GP	Games played	GS	Games started	MPG	Minutes per game
FG%	Field goal percentage	3P%	3-point field goal percentage	FT%	Free throw percentage
RPG	Rebounds per game	APG	Assists per game	SPG	Steals per game
BPG	Blocks per game	PPG	Points per game	**Bold**	Career high

=== NBA ===
==== Regular season ====
Year	Team	GP	MPG	FG%	FT%	RPG	APG	SPG	BPG	PPG
1974–75	Houston	33	6.5	.420	.682	1.1	.7	.3	.1	3.0

==== Playoffs ====
Year	Team	GP	MPG	FG%	FT%	RPG	APG	SPG	BPG	PPG
1975	Houston	4	1.3	.600	–	.3	.3	.0	.0	1.5
