= Pete Miller (basketball) =

American basketball player and coach

Personal information
- Born: May 4, 1952 (age 74)
- Listed height: 6 ft 3 in (1.91 m)

Career information
- College: San Jose State (–1975)
- Playing career: 1975–1985
- Coaching career: 1985–present

Career history

Playing
- 1975–1978: Donar
- 1978–1982: TuS 04 Leverkusen
- 1982–1985: Bayern Munich

Coaching
- 1985–1987: Bayern Munich
- 1987–1989: SG München
- 1989–1993: Lotus München
- 1995–1996: TG Landshut
- 1998–1999: DJK Würzburg
- 2000–2005: TG Landshut (assistant)
- 2008–2011: Aris Leeuwarden
- 2011–2015: WBC Wels
- 2015: Chemnitz 99
- 2021: Donar

Richard "Pete" Miller (born May 4, 1952) is an American retired basketball player and current coach.

== Playing career ==
Miller played collegiate basketball for the San Jose State Spartans men's basketball team. From 1975, Miller played three seasons with Nationale Nederlanden Donar in the Dutch Eredivisie. He averaged 20.4 points per game over three seasons in the Eredivisie. Later, he left to play in Germany for Bayer Leverkusen and later Bayern Munich.

== Coaching career ==
Miller started his coaching career with Bayern Munich in 1985 and spent the next decade in Germany coaching several clubs in the Munich area.

In 2008, Miller returned to the Netherlands to coach Aris Leeuwarden. In 2010, he reached the semi-finals of the DBL with Aris.

On April 12, 2021, Miller signed as head coach of Donar for the remainder of the 2020–21 season after the club sacked Ivan Rudež. Donar was eliminated in the semifinals of the playoffs by Heroes Den Bosch.

== Personal ==
Miller is often nicknamed "Pistol Pete" after Peter "Le Pistol" Dickson.
