= Canadians (basketball club) =

Dutch basketball club

- Founded: 1951
- Dissolved: 1994
- History: BV Landlust; 1951–1973; Canadians; 1973–1993
- Championships: 2 Dutch Leagues

Canadians, formerly known as BV Landlust, was a Dutch basketball club from Amsterdam. The team was one of the original twelve teams in the Eredivisie. The team was founded in 1952 and played in the Eredivisie for 42 seasons.

== History ==
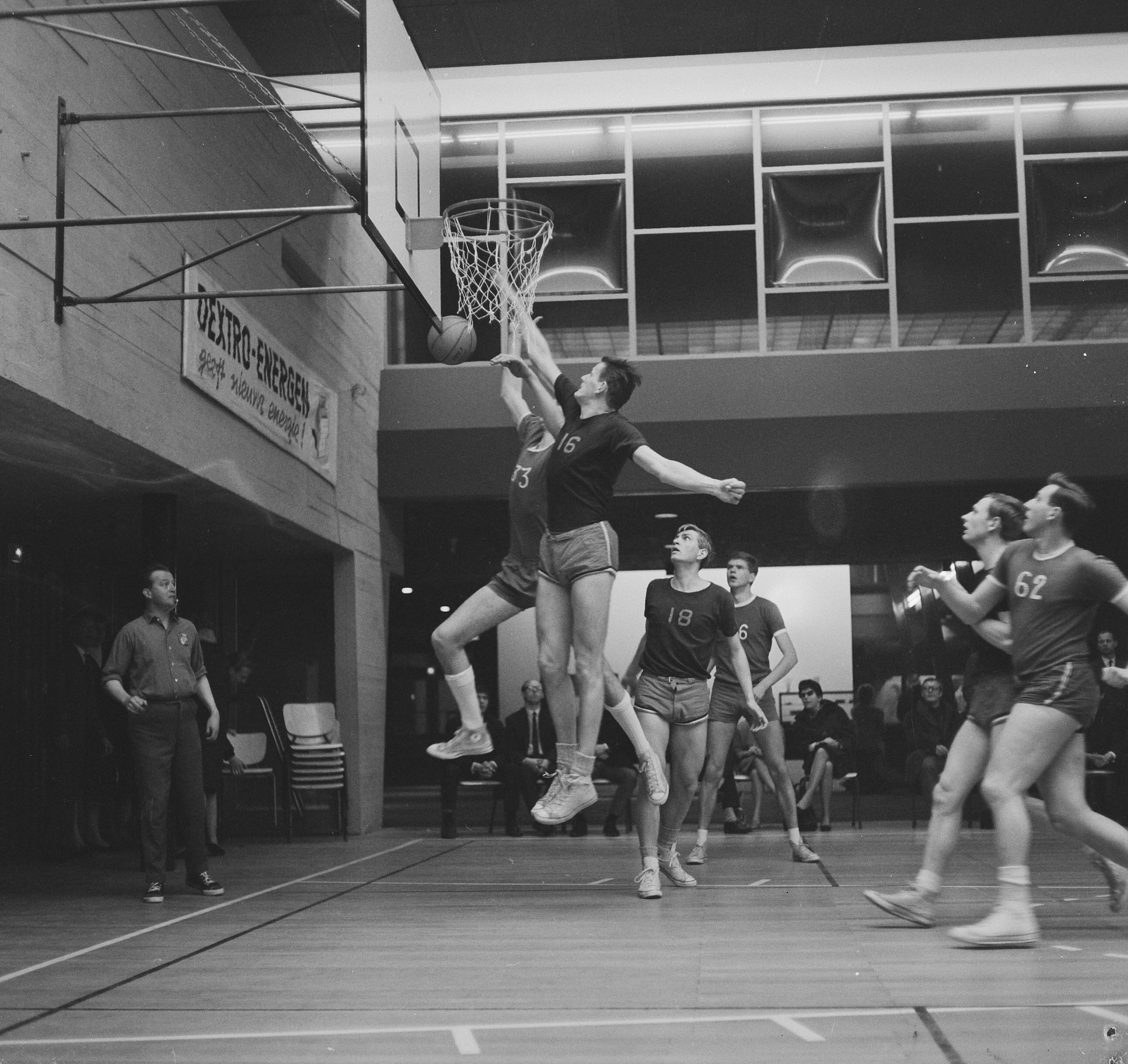
Landlust playing Herly in 1965

Landlust was founded in 1951 and remained until 1992–93 season in the Premier League, with the exception of the 1972–73 season. The club from Amsterdam is third with 32 seasons in the league, after Den Bosch (40) and Donar (38).

Landlust played until 1972 without sponsor. On return to the Premier League in 1973–74, adopted for sponsorship reasons the name Delta Lloyd Amsterdam, a name that remained for eight years. In 1981, Black Velvet Rose sponsor baton and was named Black Velvet Canadians. In 1986 Sportlife sponsor but the name remained Canadians: Sports Life Canadians. The season 1990–91 was a sponsor of charge year and the club went through life as Canadians Amsterdam. The last two seasons the club was sponsored by Graydon and was named the club Gray Dons Canadians. In 1994 the club dissolved.

The first men's team won in 1962 and 1963, the national championship.

== Honours ==
=== Men's team ===
Eredivisie

- Winners (2): 1961–62, 1962–63

=== Women's team ===
Dames Eredivisie

- Winners (4): 1959–60, 1979–80, 1980–81, 1985–86

== Names ==
Due to sponsorship reasons the team had many names:

- BV Landlust Amsterdam (1957–1973)
- Delta Lloyd Amsterdam (1973–1981)
- Black Velvet Canadians (1981–1985)
- Sportlife Canadians (1986–1990)
- Graydon Canadians (1991–1993)

== Individual awards ==
Dutch League MVP

- Hank Smith – 1976

All-DBL Team

- Hank Smith – 1976
- Jimmy Moore – 1985
- Doug Spradley – 1992
- Paul Vrind – 1993

DBL Coach of the Year

- Edwin van der Hart – 1982
