= BV Amstelveen =

Former Dutch professional baseball club

Basketbalvereniging Amstelveen was a professional basketball club based in Amstelveen, Netherlands.

== History ==
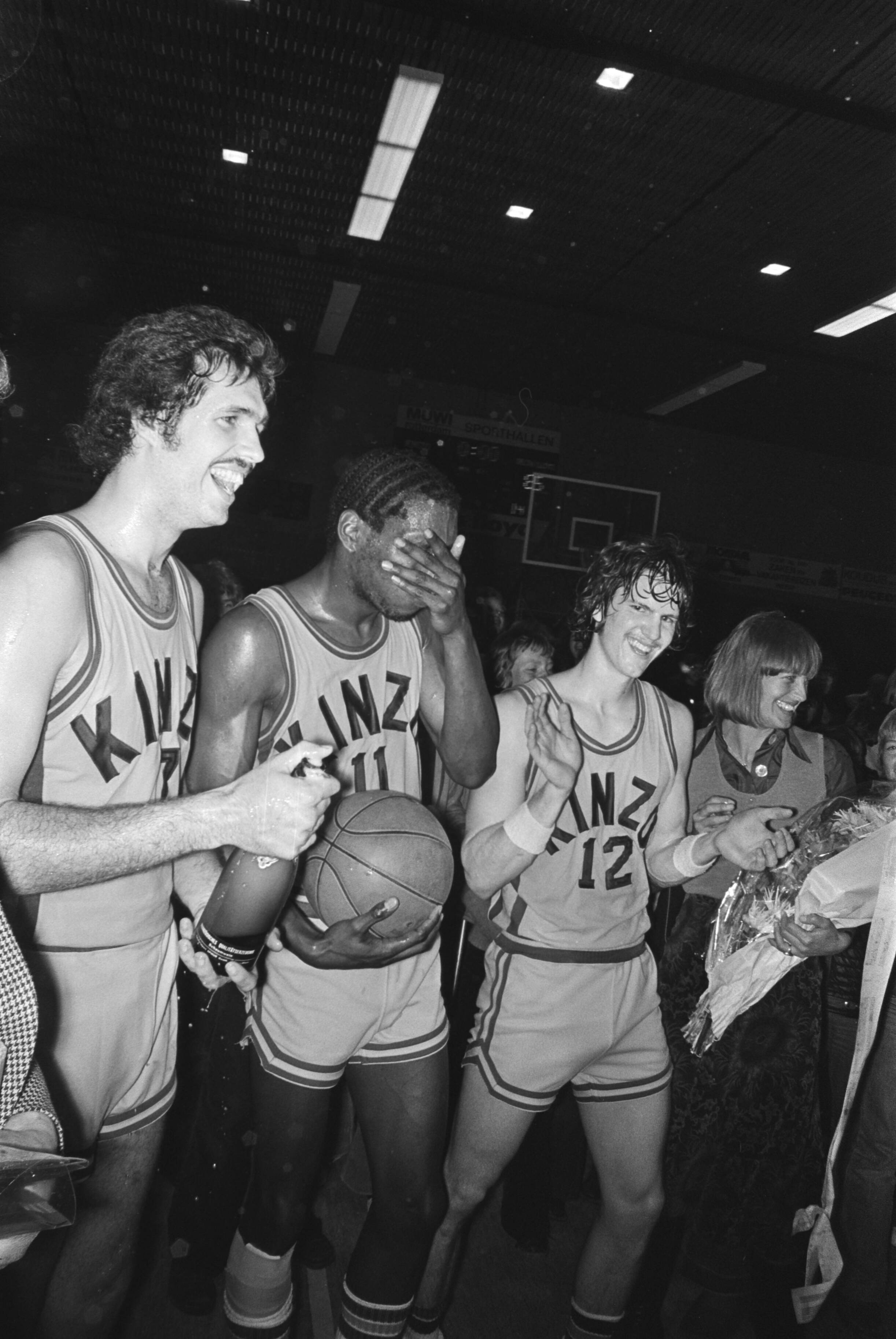
Kinzo Amstelveen players celebrating after winning the 1975-76 championship

BV Amstelveen had to wait until the 1970s to celebrate the first successes in the Dutch league. The club under the sponsorship name of Kinzo Amstelveen became back to back Dutch champions in the biennium 1975–76/1976–77(ranked first twice in a row with 29–7 and 33–3 record in the regular seasons each year). In 1976–77 season Kinzo also played in the first round of FIBA European Champions Cup where it faced in a group stage, the Belgian Racing Maes Pils Mechelen, the French Tours and the Austrian Shopping Centre Wien, with a record of two wins (both in Amstelveen) and four defeats.

== Honours & achievements ==
Dutch League

- Winners (2): 1975–76, 1976–77

Dutch Cup

- Runners-up (1): 1978–79

== Notable players ==
- Owen Wells
- Dan Cramer
