= DSBV Punch =

Punch
- Leagues: 2e divisie
- Founded: 1952
- Arena: Sportcentrum TU Delft
- Location: Delft, Netherlands
- Championships: 2 Dutch Championships; 1 Dutch Cup
- Website: punch-basketball.nl
Home	Away

Delftse Studenten Basketball Vereniging Punch or simply Punch Delft is a Dutch amateur basketball team from the city of Delft. The team plays in the 2e divisie, the Dutch fourth division.

Punch was active as a professional team from 1960 till 1982 in the Dutch first division, the Dutch Basketball League. The team won the Dutch national championship in 1969 and 1975. The team won the NBB Cup in 1974.

Punch also played in European competitions in multiple seasons in its history, for example in the 1969–70 FIBA European Champions Cup. In the 1972–73 FIBA European Cup Winners' Cup it faced of against the elite Greek team Olympiacos.

== Honours ==
Dutch League (1st tier)

- Winners (2): 1968–69, 1974–75

Dutch Cup

- Winners (1): 1973–74

Eerste divisie (3rd tier)

- Winners (2): 1963–64, 2002–03,

== European record ==
Season	Competition	Round	Club	Home	Away
1969–70	FIBA European Champions Cup	R1	(Poland) Legia Warsaw	74–80	84–79
1972–73	FIBA European Cup Winners' Cup	R1	(Greece) Olympiacos	88–68	107–77
1973–74	FIBA Korać Cup	R1	(Belgium) Bus Fruit Lier	80–76	74–74
1973–74	FIBA Korać Cup	R2	(Italy) Snaidero Udine	76–74	87–71
1974–75	FIBA European Cup Winners' Cup	R1	(Greece) AEK	0–2*	72–71

(*) Match not played.

== Notable players ==
Note: Flags indicate national team eligibility at FIBA-sanctioned events. Players may hold other non-FIBA nationalities not displayed.

Criteria

To appear in this section a player must have either:

- Set a club record or won an individual award while at the club
- Played at least one official international match for their national team at any time
- Played at least one official NBA match at any time.

- (Netherlands) Toon van Helfteren
- (United States) Harry Rogers
- (Netherlands) Jan Sikking
