= DBL All-Star Team =

Dutch all-star basketball team

The Dutch Basketball League (DBL) All-Star Team, also known as All-DBL Team, is a team constituted by the main players in a season of the Dutch Basketball League, the highest professional basketball league in the Netherlands. This team is based on players' performance throughout the regular season. After the end of the season, the best players of each position are chosen. It is not to be confused with the DBL All-Star Gala, an event where the best players in the league come together.

== Teams ==
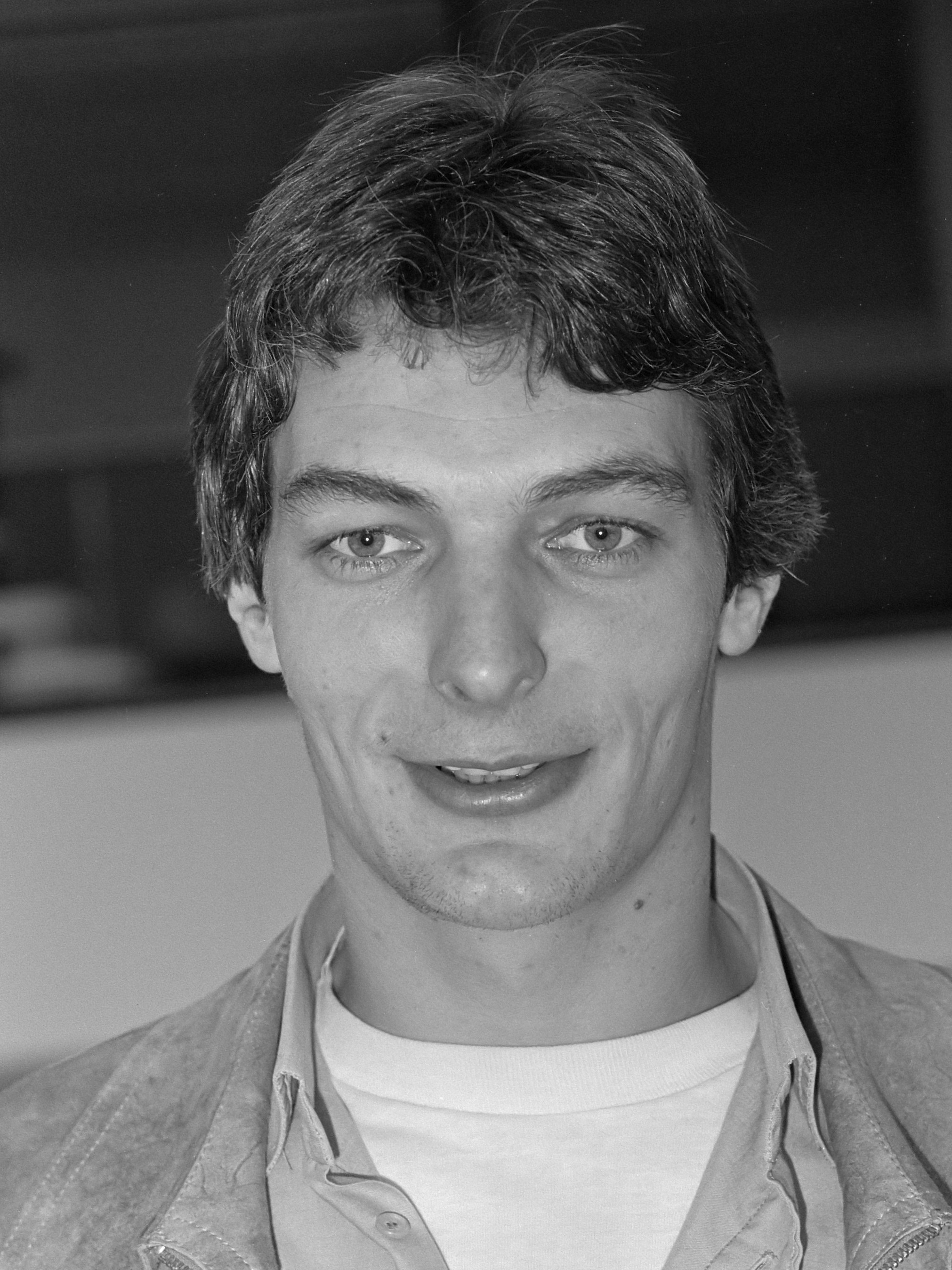
Kees Akerboom, Sr. was named to the team seven times. He holds the record for most selections along Marcel Huijbens.

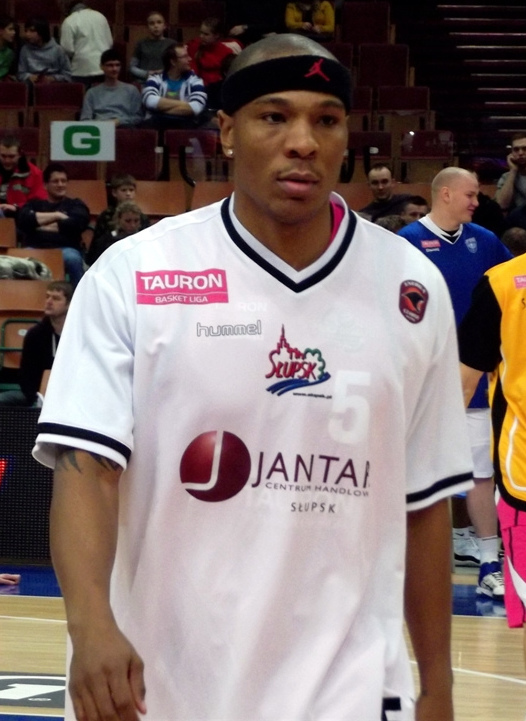
Darnell Hinson was a member of the 2006 All-Star Team

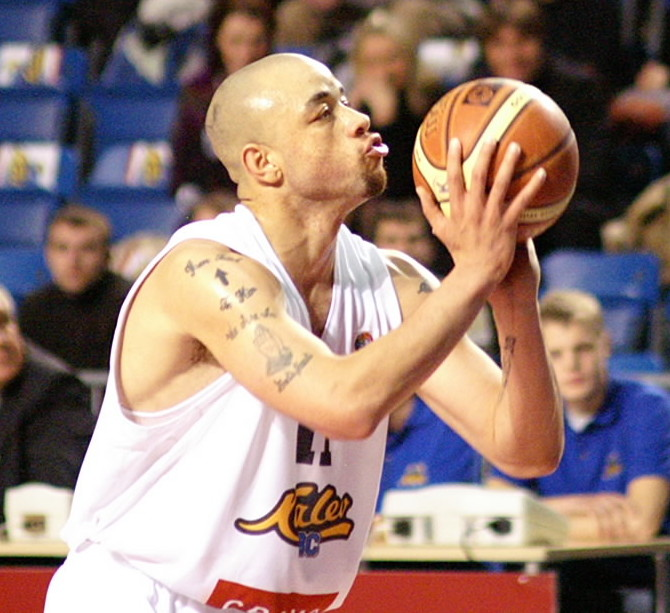
Travis Reed was named to the team three times

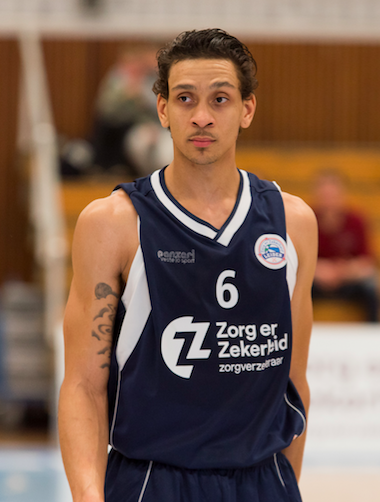
Dutch guard Worthy de Jong has been named to three All-DBL Teams

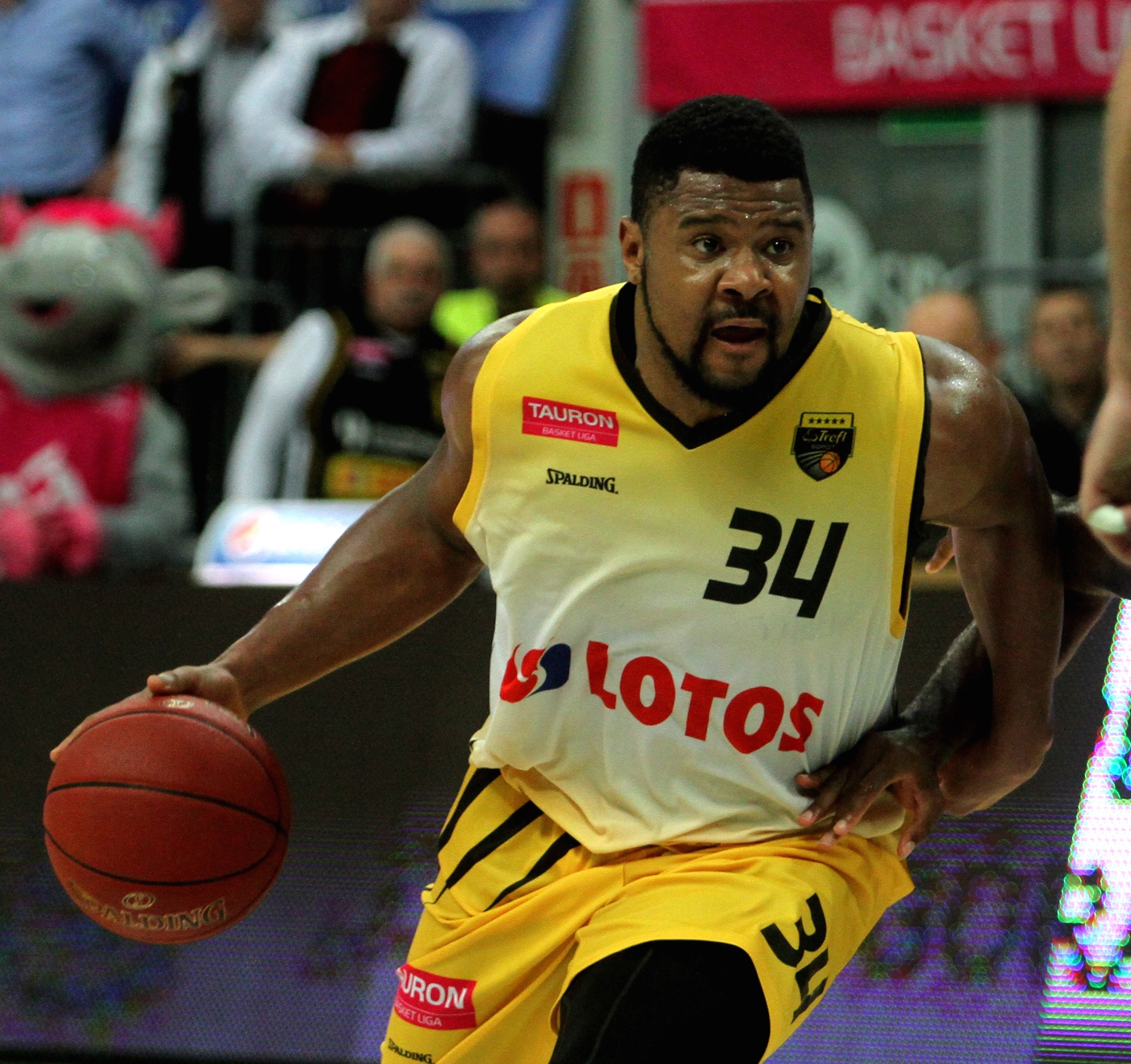
Lance Jeter was named to the team in 2015, 2016, 2017 and 2019

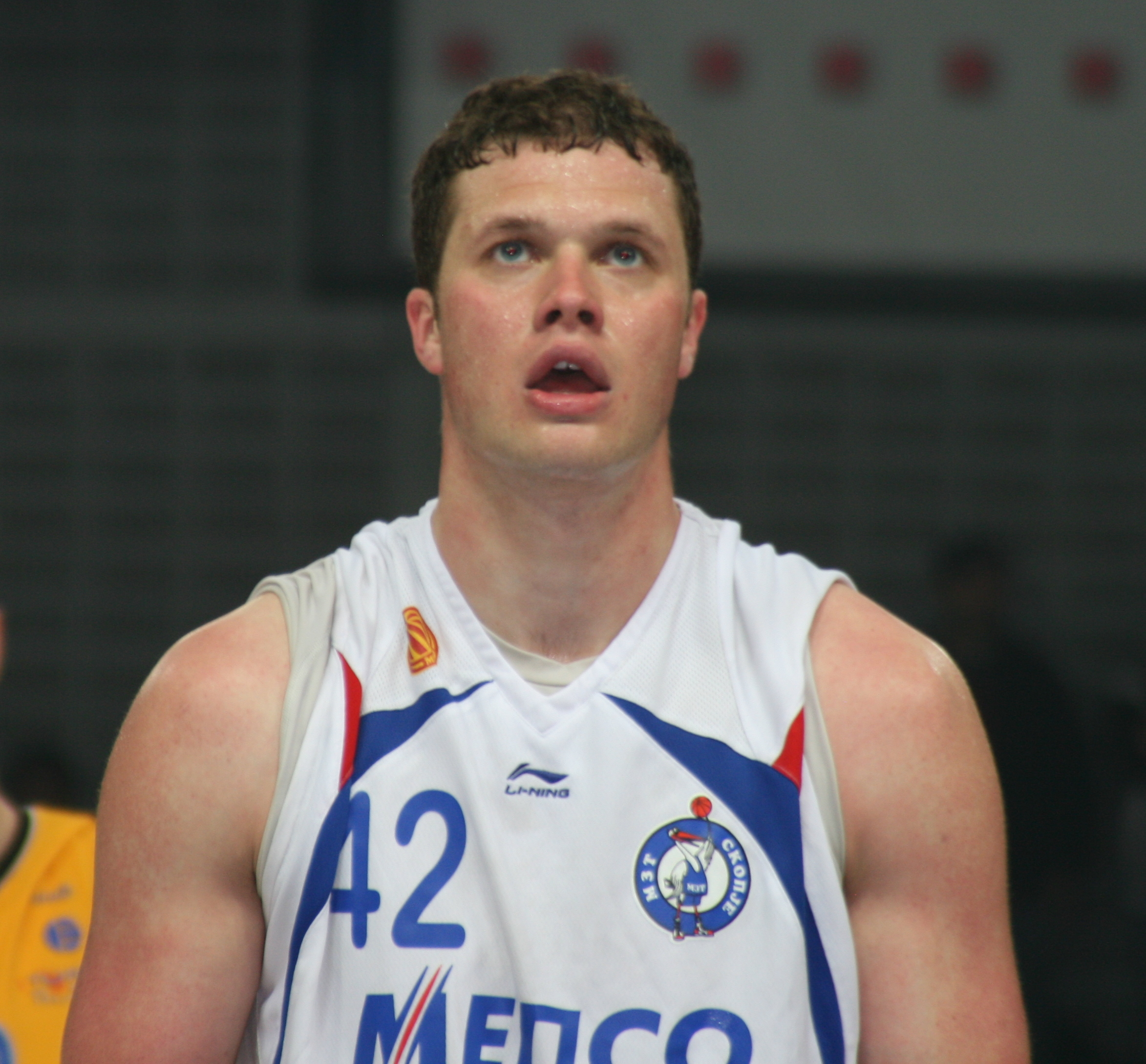
Noah Dahlman was named to the team in 2018 and 2019

| Player (X) | Denotes the number of times the player has been selected |
| ‡ | Indicates the player who won the Most Valuable Player Award in the same year |
| **Bold** | Indicates the player who won the Most Valuable Player Award in the same year |

=== 1973–2010 ===
| Season | Pos. | Player | Club |
|---|---|---|---|
| 1973–74 | G | Jan Dekker | Transol RZ |
| 1973–74 | G | Jacky Dinkins | Transol RZ |
| 1973–74 | F | Hank Smith | Flamingo's Haarlem |
| 1973–74 | F | Kees Akerboom Sr. | Flamingo's Haarlem |
| 1973–74 | C | Gary Freeman | The Lions Zandvoort |
| 1974–75 | G | Dan Cramer | Kino Amstelveen |
| 1974–75 | G | Jan Dekker (2) | Transol RZ |
| 1974–75 | F | Jacky Dinkins (2) | Transol RZ |
| 1974–75 | F | Kees Akerboom Sr. (2) | Levi's Flamingo's Haarlem |
| 1974–75 | F | **Harry Rogers** † | Punch Delft |
| 1974–75 | C | Gary Freeman (2) | The Lions Zandvoort |
| 1975–76 | G | Owen Wells | Kino Amstelveen |
| 1975–76 | G | Joe Wallace | Kino Amstelveen |
| 1975–76 | F | **Hank Smith (2) †** | Canadians Amsterdam |
| 1975–76 | F | Steven Bravard | Remington Den Bosch |
| 1975–76 | C | Gary Freeman (3) | Buitoni Haarlem |
| 1976–77 | G | Bill Mallory | BC Markt Utrecht |
| 1976–77 | G | Joe Wallace (2) | Kino Amstelveen |
| 1976–77 | F | **Jimmy Moore †** | Arke Stars Enschede |
| 1976–77 | F | Jimmy Woudstra | Punch Delft |
| 1976–77 | C | Harry Rogers (2) | Punch Delft |
| 1977–78 | G | **Art Collins †** | Parker Leiden |
| 1977–78 | G | Bill Mallory (2) | BOB Oud-Beijerland |
| 1977–78 | F | Kees Akerboom Sr. (3) | Falcon Jeans Den Bosch |
| 1977–78 | F | Gary Freeman (4) | Buitoni Haarlem |
| 1977–78 | C | Donald Washington | BV RZ |
| 1978–79 | G | Mitchell Plaat | Parker Leiden |
| 1978–79 | G | Art Collins (2) | Parker Leiden |
| 1978–79 | F | Jimmy Moore (2) | Rowic |
| 1978–79 | F | **James Lister** † | EBBC Den Bosch |
| 1978–79 | C | Mike Schulz | BOB Oud-Beijerland |
| 1979–80 | G | Mitchell Plaat (2) | Parker Leiden |
| 1979–80 | G | Owen Wells (2) | BV Amstelveen |
| 1979–80 | F | **Kees Akerboom Sr. (4) †** | Nashua Den Bosch |
| 1979–80 | F | Dave Downey | RZ |
| 1979–80 | C | James Lister (2) | Nashua Den Bosch |
| 1980–81 | G | Mitchell Plaat (3) | Parker Leiden |
| 1980–81 | G | Randy Wiel | BV Amstelveen |
| 1980–81 | F | **Kees Akerboom Sr. (5) †** | Nashua Den Bosch |
| 1980–81 | F | Jimmy Moore (3) | Rowic |
| 1980–81 | C | Wilson Washington | BV Amstelveen |
| 1981–82 | G | Mitchell Plaat (4) | Parker Leiden |
| 1981–82 | G | Scott Runia | BV Amstelveen |
| 1981–82 | F | Kees Akerboom Sr. (6) | Nashua Den Bosch |
| 1981–82 | F | Jimmy Moore (4) | Donar |
| 1981–82 | C | **Wilson Washington (2) †** | BV Amstelveen |
| 1982–83 | No All-Star Team named. | | |
| 1983–84 | G | Mitchell Plaat (5) | Nashua Den Bosch |
| 1983–84 | G | Emil Hagens | Elmex Leiden |
| 1983–84 | F | Larry Gibson | Nashua Den Bosch |
| 1983–84 | F | Jos Kuipers | Nashua Den Bosch |
| 1983–84 | C | **Jerry Beck †** | ZZ Leiden |
| 1984–85 | G | Emil Hagens (2) | Elmex Leiden |
| 1984–85 | G | Marco de Waard | Doppeldouche Den Helder |
| 1984–85 | F | **Kees Akerboom Sr. (7) †** | Nashua Den Bosch |
| 1984–85 | F | Jimmy Moore (5) | Canadians Amsterdam |
| 1984–85 | C | Jerry Beck (2) | Elmex Leiden |
| 1985–86 | G | Emil Hagens (3) | BS Leiden |
| 1985–86 | G | Jelle Esveldt | Nashua Den Bosch |
| 1985–86 | F | Marco de Waard (2) | Doppeldouche Den Helder |
| 1985–86 | F | Hans Heijdeman | BS Leiden |
| 1985–86 | C | Robert Sanders | BS Weert |
| 1986–87 | G | Emil Hagens (4) | Nashua Den Bosch |
| 1986–87 | G | Martin de Vries | Ahrend Donar |
| 1986–87 | F | Ronald Schilp | Direktbank Den Helder |
| 1986–87 | F | **José Waitman** † | Direktbank Den Helder |
| 1986–87 | C | Mike Reddick | Nashua Den Bosch |
| 1987–88 | G | Carl Lott | DAS Delft |
| 1987–88 | G | Keith Williams | BS Weert |
| 1987–88 | F | Paul Thompson | Nashua Den Bosch |
| 1987–88 | F | Jos Kuipers (2) | Nashua Den Bosch |
| 1987–88 | C | **Mike Reddick (2) †** | Nashua Den Bosch |
| 1988–89 | G | Andre Banks | BS Weert |
| 1988–89 | G | Martin de Vries (2) | Ahrend Donar |
| 1988–89 | F | **Rob Jones** † | Computerij Meppel |
| 1988–89 | F | Chris van Dinten | BS Weert |
| 1988–89 | C | Mike Reddick (3) | Nashua Den Bosch |
| 1989–90 | G | Cees van Rootselaar | Noordkop Den Helder |
| 1989–90 | G | Bud Greer | DAS Delft |
| 1989–90 | F | Mark Mitchell | Computerij Meppel |
| 1989–90 | F | Peter Thibeaux | Nashua Den Bosch |
| 1989–90 | C | **Kevin McDuffie** † | BS Weert |
| 1990–91 | G | Keith Williams (2) | Akrides |
| 1990–91 | G | Bernard Day | Donar |
| 1990–91 | F | Cliff Windham | Akrides |
| 1990–91 | F | **Lenzie Howell** † | Computerij Meppel |
| 1990–91 | C | Maurice Smith | BC Eindhoven |
| 1991–92 | G | Carl Lott (2) | Den Bosch Basketball |
| 1991–92 | G | Doug Spradley | Canadians Amsterdam |
| 1991–92 | F | Lamont Randolph | DAS Delft |
| 1991–92 | F | **Lenzie Howell (2) †** | Computerij Meppel |
| 1991–92 | C | Richard van Poelgeest | BS Weert |
| 1992–93 | G | Frank Ardon | EBBC Den Bosch |
| 1992–93 | G | Carl Lott (3) | EBBC Den Bosch |
| 1992–93 | F | Okke te Velde | Commodore Den Helder |
| 1992–93 | F | **Jack Jennings** † | Donar Groningen |
| 1992–93 | C | Paul Vrind | Canadians Amsterdam |
| 1993–94 | G | Larenzo Nash | BC Zwijndrecht |
| 1993–94 | G | Mario Bennes | BV Haarlem |
| 1993–94 | F | Mike Vreeswijk | EBBC Den Bosch |
| 1993–94 | F | Jeff Chambers | Den Helder |
| 1993–94 | C | **Richard van Poelgeest (2) †** | BS Weert |
| 1994–95 | G | Michael Huger | GOBA Gorinchem |
| 1994–95 | G | Matt Stanford | Den Helder |
| 1994–95 | F | Okke te Velde (2) | GOBA Gorinchem |
| 1994–95 | F | Tico Cooper | GOBA Gorinchem |
| 1994–95 | C | **Sonique Nixon** † | BS Weert |
| 1995–96 | G | Michael Huger (2) | Rotterdam |
| 1995–96 | G | Jeff Malham | Goba Gorinchem |
| 1995–96 | F | **Marcel Huijbens** † | EBBC Den Bosch |
| 1995–96 | F | Donnell Thomas | Donar Groningen |
| 1995–96 | C | Riley Smith | EBBC Den Bosch |
| 1996–97 | G | Jerome de Vries | Amsterdam |
| 1996–97 | G | Mike Vreeswijk (2) | EBBC Den Bosch |
| 1996–97 | F | **Marcel Huijbens (2) †** | EBBC Den Bosch |
| 1996–97 | F | Donnell Thomas (2) | Donar Groningen |
| 1996–97 | C | Jeff Chambers (2) | BS Weert |
| 1997–98 | G | Tony Miller | Hans Verkerk Keukens Den Helder |
| 1997–98 | G | Jeff Chambers (3) | BS Weert |
| 1997–98 | F | John Smith | BS Weert |
| 1997–98 | F | **Donnell Thomas (3) †** | Donar Groningen |
| 1997–98 | C | Marcel Huijbens (3) | EBBC Den Bosch |
| 1998–99 | G | Tony Miller (2) | Den Helder |
| 1998–99 | G | Dan Shanks | The Hammers Zwolle |
| 1998–99 | F | **Ralph Biggs** † | BS Weert |
| 1998–99 | F | Marcel Huijbens (4) | EBBC Den Bosch |
| 1998–99 | C | Chris Mims | Den Helder |
| 1999–2000 | G | Chris McGuthrie | Ricoh Astronauts |
| 1999–2000 | G | Quentin Hall | Image Center Werkendam |
| 1999–2000 | F | **Joe Spinks** † | Ricoh Astronauts |
| 1999–2000 | F | Marcel Huijbens (5) | EBBC Den Bosch |
| 1999–2000 | C | Lamont Randolph (2) | MPC Donar |
| 2001–02 | G | Ryan Robertson | EiffelTowers Nijmegen |
| 2001–02 | G | Hakeem Ward | Den Helder |
| 2001–02 | F | Joe Spinks | Amsterdam Astronauts |
| 2001–02 | F | Eric Nelson | EiffelTowers Nijmegen |
| 2001–02 | C | Lamont Randolph (3) | MPC Donar |
| 2002–03 | G | Ryan Robertson (2) | EiffelTowers Nijmegen |
| 2002–03 | G | Travis Young | MPC Capitals |
| 2002–03 | F | **Joe Spinks (2) †** | Amsterdam Astronauts |
| 2002–03 | F | Marcel Huijbens (6) | EBBC Den Bosch |
| 2002–03 | C | Mate Milisa | EiffelTowers Nijmegen |
| 2003–04 | G | Ryan Robertson (3) | EiffelTowers Nijmegen |
| 2003–04 | G | Travis Young (2) | MPC Capitals |
| 2003–04 | F | Joe Spinks (3) | Amsterdam Astronauts |
| 2003–04 | F | **Travis Reed** † | MPC Capitals |
| 2003–04 | C | Marcel Huijbens (7) | EBBC Den Bosch |
| 2004–05 | G | Brandon Woudstra | Aris Leeuwarden |
| 2004–05 | G | Travis Young (3) | MPC Capitals |
| 2004–05 | F | **Leon Rodgers** † | EiffelTowers Den Bosch |
| 2004–05 | F | Greg Stevenson | Landstede Zwolle |
| 2004–05 | C | Travis Reed (2) | MPC Capitals |
| 2005–06 | G | Darnell Hinson | Landstede Zwolle |
| 2005–06 | G | Travis Young (4) | EiffelTowers Den Bosch |
| 2005–06 | F | **Leon Rodgers (2) †** | EiffelTowers Den Bosch |
| 2005–06 | F | Chris Woods | BSW Weert |
| 2005–06 | C | Travis Reed (3) | MPC Capitals |
| 2006–07 | G | Ryan Sears | Matrixx Magixx |
| 2006–07 | G | Travis Young (5) | EiffelTowers Den Bosch |
| 2006–07 | F | **Leon Rodgers (3) †** | EiffelTowers Den Bosch |
| 2006–07 | F | Alhaji Mohammed | Matrixx Magixx |
| 2006–07 | C | Ransford Brempong | Matrixx Magixx |
| 2007–08 | G | Patrick Pope | West-Brabant Giants |
| 2007–08 | G | Teddy Gipson | Amsterdam |
| 2007–08 | F | Antoine Jordan | Matrixx Magixx |
| 2007–08 | F | Tyler Smith | Matrixx Magixx |
| 2007–08 | C | **Peter van Paassen †** | Amsterdam |
| 2008–09 | G | Teddy Gipson (2) | Amsterdam |
| 2008–09 | G | Matt Bauscher | Aris Leeuwarden |
| 2008–09 | F | Rein van der Kamp | Aris Leeuwarden |
| 2008–09 | F | David Chiotti | ZZ Leiden |
| 2008–09 | C | **Peter van Paassen (2) †** | Amsterdam |
| 2009–10 | G | **Danny Gibson †** | ZZ Leiden |
| 2009–10 | G | Ronny LeMelle | ZZ Leiden |
| 2009–10 | F | Kees Akerboom Jr. | EiffelTowers Den Bosch |
| 2009–10 | F | Patrick Hilliman | Rotterdam |
| 2009–10 | C | Matt Haryasz | GasTerra Flames |
| 2010–11 | G | Frank Turner | EiffelTowers Den Bosch |
| 2010–11 | G | Skip Mills | EiffelTowers Den Bosch |
| 2010–11 | F | **Jason Dourisseau^{‡}** | GasTerra Flames |
| 2010–11 | F | Seamus Boxley | Zorg en Zekerheid Leiden |
| 2010–11 | C | Matt Haryasz (2) | GasTerra Flames |
| 2011–12 | G | Thomas Jackson | ZZ Leiden |
| 2011–12 | G | Alex Wesby | GasTerra Flames |
| 2011–12 | F | Markel Humphrey | Matrixx Magixx |
| 2011–12 | F | **Seamus Boxley^{‡} (2)** | ZZ Leiden |
| 2011–12 | C | Tai Wesley | EiffelTowers Den Bosch |
| 2012–13 | G | **Andre Young^{‡}** | EiffelTowers Den Bosch |
| 2012–13 | G | Worthy de Jong | Zorg en Zekerheid Leiden |
| 2012–13 | F | Zack Novak | Landstede Zwolle |
| 2012–13 | F | Stefan Wessels | EiffelTowers Den Bosch |
| 2012–13 | C | Ross Bekkering | ZZ Leiden |
| 2013–14 | G | Cashmere Wright | GasTerra Flames |
| 2013–14 | G | **Arvin Slagter^{‡}** | GasTerra Flames |
| 2013–14 | F | Patrick Richard | Matrixx Magixx |
| 2013–14 | F | Joshua Duinker | Zorg en Zekerheid Leiden |
| 2013–14 | C | Tai Wesley (2) | SPM Shoeters Den Bosch |
| 2014–15 | G | **Lance Jeter^{‡}** | Donar |
| 2014–15 | G | Brandyn Curry | SPM Shoeters Den Bosch |
| 2014–15 | F | Worthy de Jong (2) | ZZ Leiden |
| 2014–15 | F | Mark Sanchez | Donar |
| 2014–15 | C | Joe Burton | Landstede |
| 2015–16 | G | Lance Jeter (2) | Donar |
| 2015–16 | G | **Worthy de Jong^{‡} (3)** | ZZ Leiden |
| 2015–16 | F | Grant Gibbs | Landstede Zwolle |
| 2015–16 | F | Tyson Hinz | Landstede Zwolle |
| 2015–16 | C | Ross Bekkering (2) | Donar |
| 2016–17 | G | **Lance Jeter^{‡} (3)** | Donar |
| 2016–17 | G | J.T. Tiller | Landstede Zwolle |
| 2016–17 | F | Clayton Vette | Landstede Zwolle |
| 2016–17 | F | Chase Fieler | Donar |
| 2016–17 | C | Drago Pašalić | Donar |
| 2017–18 | G | **Brandyn Curry^{‡} (2)** | Donar |
| 2017–18 | G | Carrington Love | ZZ Leiden |
| 2017–18 | F | Evan Bruinsma | Donar |
| 2017–18 | C | Noah Dahlman | Landstede Zwolle |
| 2017–18 | C | Thomas Koenis | Donar |
| 2018–19 | G | Maurice Watson, Jr. | ZZ Leiden |
| 2018–19 | G | **Darius Thompson^{‡}** | ZZ Leiden |
| 2018–19 | G | Kaza Kajami-Keane | Landstede Zwolle |
| 2018–19 | F | Jonathon Williams | New Heroes Den Bosch |
| 2018–19 | C | Noah Dahlman (2) | Landstede Zwolle |
| 2020–21 | G | Jarred Ogungbemi-Jackson | Donar |
| 2020–21 | G | Worthy de Jong (4) | ZZ Leiden |
| 2020–21 | F | Miha Lapornik | Heroes Den Bosch |
| 2020–21 | F | Arūnas Mikalauskas | Feyenoord |
| 2020–21 | C | **Emmanuel Nzekwesi^{‡}** | ZZ Leiden |

== Selections by player ==
| Player | Total |
|---|---|
| Kees Akerboom Sr. | 7 |
| Marcel Huijbens | 7 |
| Mitchell Plaat | 5 |
| Travis Young | 5 |
| Jimmy Moore | 5 |
| Emil Hagens | 4 |
| Worthy de Jong | 4 |
| Gary Freeman | 4 |
| Travis Reed | 3 |
| Joe Spinks | 3 |
| Lance Jeter | 3 |
| Leon Rodgers | 3 |
| Ryan Robertson | 3 |
| Mike Reddick | 3 |
| Carl Lott | 3 |
