= Kees Akerboom Trophy =

The Kees Akerboom Trophy (in Dutch: Kees Akerboom Trofee) is an individual award that is yearly given to the player with the most three-point field goals made in the Dutch Basketball League (DBL) given since 2001. The award is handed out after the regular season. The award is named after Kees Akerboom, Sr.

== Winners ==
Key
Player (X)	Name of the player and number of times they had won the award at that point (if more than one)
Nationality	Nationality as registered by FIBA, player may hold more nationalities
†	Indicates multiple award winners in the same season

Season	Player	Nationality	Club	Points	3FGA	3FGM	GP
2000–01	Omar Sneed	United States	BS Weert	24	87	37	11
2001–02	Nikola Simic	Serbia	NAC Breda	53	178	77	26
2002–03	Todd Manuel	United States	Landstede	74	226	100	28
2003–04	Eric van der Sluis	Netherlands	Den Helder	59	193	84	31
2004–05	Brandon Woudstra	United States	Aris Leeuwarden	78	195	91	28
2005–06	Phil Goss	United States	West-Brabant Giants	50	151	67	26
2006–07	Travis Young	United States	Den Bosch	72	264	122	36
2007–08	Kees Akerboom Jr.	Netherlands	Den Bosch	67	176	81	36
2008–09	Kees Akerboom Jr. (2)	Netherlands	Den Bosch	82	179	87	40
2009–10	Danny Gibson	United States	ZZ Leiden	76	227	101	36
2010–11	Zaire Taylor	United States	Magixx	30	211	57	36
2011–12	Kees Akerboom Jr. (3)	Netherlands	Den Bosch	52	134	62	27
2012–13	Arvin Slagter	Netherlands	ZZ Leiden	48	153	67	34
2013–14	Arvin Slagter	Netherlands	Donar	63	126	63	35
2014–15	Kees Akerboom Jr. (4)	Netherlands	Den Bosch	38	139	59	28
2015–16	Kees Akerboom Jr. (5)	Netherlands	Den Bosch	36	120	52	23
2016–17							
2017–18							
2018–19	Clayton Vette	United States	ZZ Leiden				
2019–20 (Note: The 2019–20 season was cancelled prematurely due to the COVID-19 pandemic.)	Not awarded as the season was abandoned due to the COVID-19 pandemic.						
2020–21	Sander Hollanders	Netherlands	BAL	55	74	167	
2020–21	Jett Speelman	United States	Yoast United	55	53	104	
