= 2002–03 Eredivisie (basketball) =

- League: Eredivisie
- Sport: Basketball

Regular season
- Top seed: EiffelTowers Nijmegen
- Season MVP: (United States) Joe Spinks (Demon Astronauts)
- Top scorer: (United States) Travis Young (21.5) (BC Omniworld Almere)

Finals
- Champions: EiffelTowers Den Bosch
- Runners-up: BC Omniworld Almere

Dutch Basketball League seasons
- ← 2001–02 2003–04 →

The 2002–03 Eredivisie season was the 43rd season of the Eredivisie in basketball, the highest professional basketball league in the Netherlands.

EiffelTowers Nijmegen, led by head coach Marco van den Berg, won their first national title on 20 May.

== Regular season ==
| Pos. | Team | GP | W | L | Points |
|---|---|---|---|---|---|
Elite A
| 1 | EiffelTowers Nijmegen | 24 | 19 | 5 | 38 |
| 2 | Ricoh Astronauts | 24 | 16 | 8 | 32 |
| 3 | BC Omniworld Almere | 24 | 13 | 11 | 26 |
| 4 | BS Weert | 24 | 12 | 12 | 24 |
| 5 | EBBC Den Bosch | 24 | 12 | 12 | 24 |
Elite B
| 6 | CEB Noordkop | 24 | 16 | 8 | 32 |
| 7 | MPC Donar | 24 | 12 | 12 | 24 |
| 8 | Landstede Basketbal | 24 | 12 | 12 | 24 |
| 9 | Rotterdam Basketbal | 24 | 4 | 20 | 8 |

== Playoffs ==
=== Bracket ===
Quarterfinals
1 | EiffelTowers Nijmegen | 2
8 | Landstede Basketbal | 1
4 | BS Weert | 1
5 | EBBC Den Bosch | 2
2 | Ricoh Astronauts | 2
7 | MPC Donar | 0
3 | BC Omniworld Almere | 2
6 | CEB Noordkop | 0

Semifinals
1 | EiffelTowers Nijmegen | 2
5 | EBBC Den Bosch | 1
2 | Ricoh Astronauts | 0
3 | BC Omniworld Almere | 2

Finals
1 | EiffelTowers Nijmegen | 4
3 | BC Omniworld Almere | 1

=== Finals ===
11 May
16:00

Boxscore

EiffelTowers Nijmegen 89, Omniworld 80
| Pts: Milisa, Nelson 16 each Rebs: Eric Nelson 11; Asts: Eric Nelson 6 | Pts: Young, Norvell 17 each Rebs: Ronald van Velzen 11; Asts: Ed Norvell 5 |
EiffelTowers lead series 1–0

De Horstacker, Nijmegen
Referees:
- Nico Zwiep
- Henk Veenstra

13 May
19:30

Boxscore

Omniworld 67, EiffelTowers Nijmegen 69
| Pts: Travis Young 28; Rebs: Travis Young 13; Asts: Ed Norvell 6 | Pts: Patrick Cortenraede 14; Rebs: Mate Milisa 10; Asts: Chris Mims 5 |
EiffelTowers lead series 2–0

Waterwijk, Almere
Referees:
- Michel Zegwaard
- Peter van den Eijnden

15 May
19:30

Boxscore

EiffelTowers Nijmegen 83, Omniworld 93
| Pts: Eric Nelson 23; Rebs: Mate Milisa 8 Asts: Ryan Robertson 9 | Pts: Travis Young 22; Rebs: Ronald van Velzen 10; Asts: Travis Young 9 |
EiffelTowers lead series 2–1

De Horstacker, Nijmegen
Referees:
- Nico Zwiep
- Henk Veenstra

17 May
19:30

Boxscore

Omniworld 67, EiffelTowers Nijmegen 96
| Pts: Jerome de Vries 19; Rebs: Ronald van Velzen 10; Asts: Ed Norvell 6 | Pts: Chris Mims 23; Rebs: Mims, Nelson 10 each Asts: Ryan Robertson 6 |
EiffelTowers lead series 3–1

Waterwijk, Almere
Referees:
- Paul den Hartog
- Martijn de Vries

20 May
19:30

Boxscore

EiffelTowers Nijmegen 83, Omniworld 55
| Pts: Ryan Robertson 19; Rebs: Herbert, Milisa 12 each Asts: Ryan Robertson 6 | Pts: Ed Norvell 13; Rebs: Derrick Tilmon 9 Asts: Five players 1 each |
EiffelTowers wins series 4–1

De Horstacker, Nijmegen
Referees:
- Jan Chris Herweijer
- Nico Zwiep
