= List of Dutch Basketball League season scoring leaders =

In basketball, points are the sum of the score accumulated through free throws or field goals. The Dutch Basketball League's (DBL) scoring title is awarded to the player with the highest points per game average in a given season.

== Scoring leaders ==
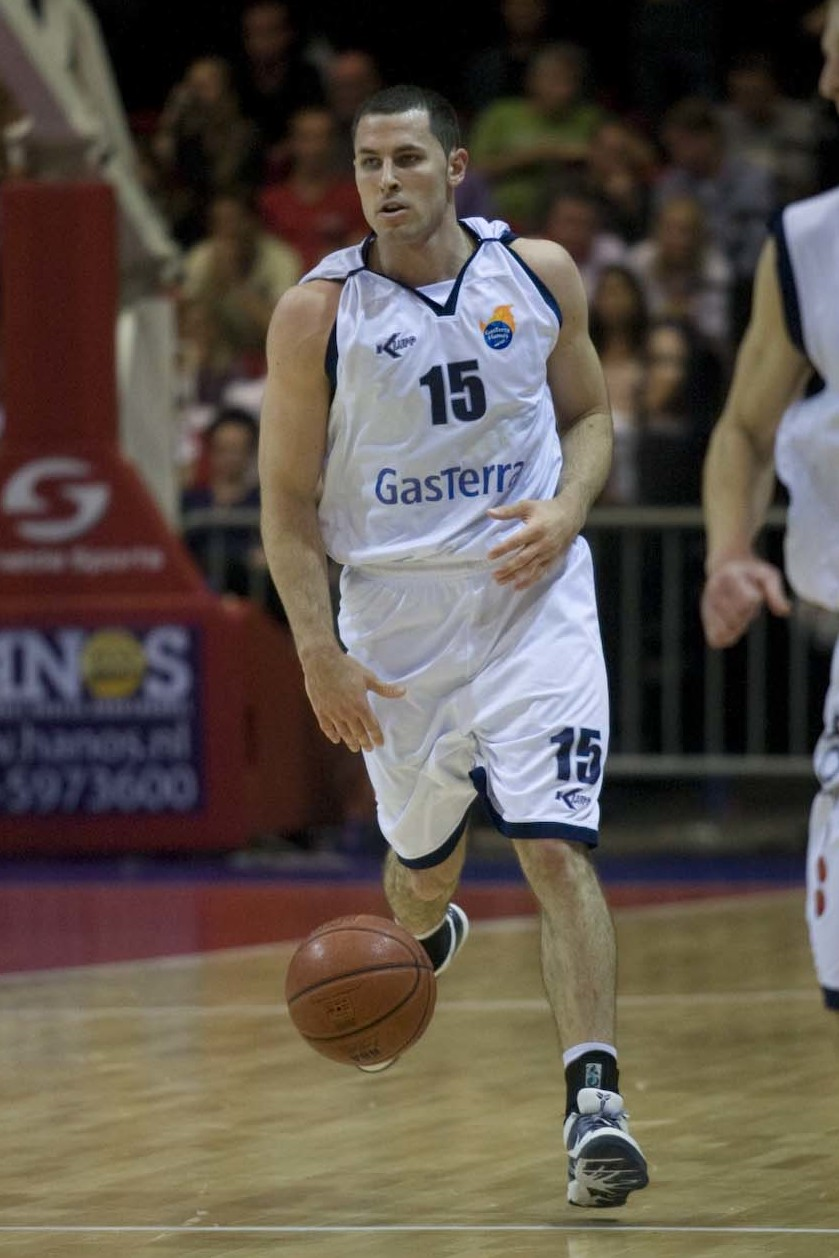
Matt Bauscher was the league leading scorer in the 2008–09 season.

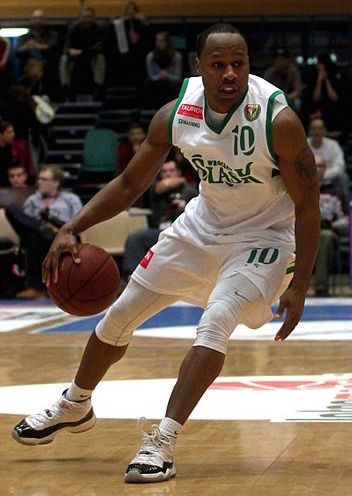
Danny Gibson was the top scorer in 2010.

Key
Player (X)	Name of the player and number of times they had won the award at that point (if more than one)
Club (X)	Name of the club and the number of times a player of it has won the award (if more than one)
†	Denotes player whose team won championship that year
^	Denotes player who is still active in the DBL
PPG	Points per game

Season	Player	Position	Nationality	Team	PPG	Total
1985–86	York Gross	Forward	United States	BSW Weert	24.4	195
1986–87	Donald Petties	Guard	United States	BSW Weert (2)	26.1	888
1987–88	Keith Williams	Guard	United States	BSW Weert (3)	27.5	991
1988–89	Cedric Miller	Center	Bahamas	Rotterdam	26.4	952
1989–90	Maurice Smith	Forward	United States	Eindhoven	25.4	837
1990–91	Maurice Smith (2)	Forward	United States	Eindhoven (2)	27.8	806
1991–92	Lenzie Howell	Forward	United States	Red Giants Meppel	28.8	777
1992–93	Mark Hill	Guard	United States	BSW Weert (4)	24.4	195
1993–94	Larenzo Nash	Guard	United States	Zwijndrecht	22.5	225
1994–95	Dylan Ridgon	Guard	United States	Den Bosch	22.1	354
1995–96	Michael Huger	Guard	United States	Rotterdam (2)	22.1	354
1996–97	Donnell Thomas	Forward	United States	Donar	24.6	541
1997–98	Donnell Thomas (2)	Forward	United States	Donar (2)	28.4	908
1998–99	Jamal Wilson	Guard	United States	Voorburg	26.4	765
1999–00	Quentin Hall	Guard	United States	Virtus Werkendam	20.3	630
2000–01	Omar Sneed	Forward	United States	BSW Weert (5)	27.1	867
2001–02	Mack Tuck	Forward	United States	Donar (3)	24.5	514
2002–03	Travis Young	Guard	United States	Omniworld Almere	21.5	517
2003–04	Marcel Huijbens	Center	Netherlands	Den Bosch (2)	19.8	711
2004–05	Brandon Woudstra	Guard	United States	Aris Leeuwarden	23.3	651
2005–06	Chris Woods	Forward	United States	BSW Weert (6)	23.0	597
2006–07	Alhaji Mohammed	Forward	Ghana	Magixx	23.2	789
2007–08	Darnell Wilson	Forward	United States	Landstede Zwolle	19.5	703
2008–09	Matt Bauscher	Guard	United States	Aris Leeuwarden (2)	22.0	836
2009–10	Danny Gibson	Guard	United States	ZZ Leiden	18.8	677
2010–11	Glenn Stokes	Guard	United States	BSW Weert (7)	16.7	587
2011–12	Tyrone Sally	Forward	United States	Rotterdam (3)	18.4	461
2012–13	Anthony Miles	Guard	United States	Rotterdam (4)	18.8	638
2013–14	Darius Theus	Guard	United States	Aris Leeuwarden (3)	16.9	609
2014–15	Yannick Franke	Guard	Netherlands	Rotterdam (4)	19.6	550
2015–16	Javier Duren	Guard	United States	Aris Leeuwarden (4)	17.7	495
2016–17	Jordan Gregory	Guard	United States	Aris Leeuwarden (5)	18.5	518
2017–18	Ordane Kanda-Kanyinda	Guard	Belgium	Rotterdam (5)	18.8	582
2018–19	Darius Thompson	Guard	United States	ZZ Leiden (2)	19.4	640
2019–20 (Note: The 2019–20 season was cancelled prematurely due to the COVID-19 pandemic.)	Xavier Cannefax	Guard	United States	Apollo Amsterdam	21.8	371
2020–21†	Emmanuel Nzekwesi	Center	Netherlands	ZZ Leiden (3)	21.8	528
2021–22 (Note: Since the 2021–22 season, the DBL was re-placed by the BNXT League. The season scoring leaders are the players from Dutch clubs with the highest point average in the domestic phase (excluding playoffs).)	Noah Dahlman	Center	United States	Landstede Hammers	19.1	382
2022–23	Vince Cole	Small forward	United States	Yoast United	22.7	408

== Players with most awards ==
Player	Awards	Years
(United States) Maurice Smith	2	1990, 1991
(United States) Donnell Thomas	2	1997, 1998
