= Marcel Huijbens =

Dutch basketball player

Personal information
- Born: 2 December 1967 (age 58) Leiderdorp, Netherlands
- Listed height: 2.05 m (6 ft 9 in)

Career information
- Playing career: 1988–2006
- Position: Center
- Number: 10

Career history
- 1988–1991: Orca's
- 1991–2005: Den Bosch
- 2005–2006: Amsterdam Astronauts

Career highlights
- Eredivisie Most Valuable Player (1997); 7× First-team All-Eredivisie (1996–2000, 2003, 2004); 3× Eredivisie champion (1993, 1996, 1997); 4× NBB Cup winner (1993, 2000, 2002, 2006); DBL All-Star Game MVP (1997); DBL scoring champion (2004)

Marcel Huijbens (born 2 December 1967) is a Dutch former basketball player. Standing at 2.05 m (6 ft 8 1/2 in), he played at center. For the majority of his career he was a player for Den Bosch. In 1997, he was named the Most Valuable Player of the Dutch league. He holds the record for most All-DBL Team selections with 7, shared with Kees Akerboom Sr.

Huijbens played 69 games for the Netherlands national basketball team.
