= Ryan Robertson =

American basketball player (born 1976)

Personal information
- Born: October 2, 1976 (age 50) Lawton, Oklahoma, U.S.
- Listed height: 6 ft 5 in (1.96 m)
- Listed weight: 190 lb (86 kg)

Career information
- High school: St. Charles West (St. Charles, Missouri)
- College: Kansas (1995–1999)
- NBA draft: 1999: 2nd round, 45th overall pick
- Drafted by: Sacramento Kings
- Playing career: 1999–2005
- Position: Shooting guard
- Number: 10

Career history
- 1999: Kansas Cagerz
- 1999–2000: Sacramento Kings
- 2000–2001: Kansas City Knights
- 2001–2004: EiffelTowers Nijmegen
- 2004: Panellinios
- 2004: St. Louis Flight
- 2005: Cholet

Career highlights
- Eredivisie champion (2003); Dutch Cup winner (2003); 3× First-team All-Eredivisie (2002–2004); McDonald's All-American (1995); Mr. Show-Me Basketball (1995)
- Stats at NBA.com
- Stats at Basketball Reference

Ryan Ashley Robertson (born October 2, 1976) is an American former professional basketball player who was selected by the Sacramento Kings in the second round (45th pick overall) of the 1999 NBA draft. He played college basketball for the Kansas Jayhawks under coach Roy Williams. He scored a career high 31 points in a second round loss to Kentucky in the 1999 NCAA Tournament.

Robertson also played varsity basketball for four years at St. Charles West High School from 1991 to 1995. During his tenure at St. Charles West the basketball team made it to the final four in the Missouri State Championship for the first time. Robertson led the team to the State championship in 1995.

He started his professional career with the Kansas Cagerz. He played one game for the Sacramento Kings during the 1999-2000 NBA season, scoring five points. He later played professionally for the American Basketball Association team Kansas City Knights during the 2000–2001 season. After one season with the Kansas City minor league team, he then moved to Europe to play in the Netherlands for EiffelTowers Nijmegen during the 2001–04 seasons. With EiffelTowers, he won the Dutch championship and Cup in 2003.

He finished his professional career playing for Panellinios B.C. (Greece) and Cholet Basket (France) during the 2004–05 season.
