= Okke te Velde =

Dutch basketball player

Personal information
- Born: August 12, 1966 (age 60) Haarlemmermeer, Netherlands
- Listed height: 1.98 m (6 ft 6 in)

Career information
- Playing career: 1984–1999
- Position: Forward

Career history
- 1984–1987: Canadians Amsterdam
- 1987–1993: Den Helder
- 1994–1996: Goba Gorinchem
- 1998–1999: Den Helder

Career highlights
- 4× Eredivisie champion (1989–1992); 2× Dutch Cup winner (1992, 1995); 4× First-team All-Eredivisie (1993, 1995); 3x DBL Three-Point contest winner (1988, 1995, 1996); Eredivisie Rookie of the Year (1985)

Okke Sikko te Velde (born 12 August 1966 in Haarlemmermeer) is a Dutch former basketball player. He played several Dutch and Belgian teams, as well for the Netherlands national team. From 1984 to 1987, te Velde played for Canadians. From 1987 to 1993, he played six seasons with Den Helder and won four Eredivisie titles. In the 1993–94 season, he trained with Okapi Aalstar but was unable to play as the team had to await the Bosman ruling. From 1994, he played two season with Goba Gorinchem. From 1996 to 1998, Te Velde played in Belgium again for Bree. He returned to Den Helder for his final season.

== Personal ==
Okke has six brothers and four sisters. His sister Jos played in the Eredivisie as well. Te Velde has a son Jens, who played professional basketball for The Hague Royals in the Dutch Basketball League (DBL).

From 2019 to 2021, he was the technical director of Basketball Nederland, the national basketball federation.
