= Kees Akerboom =

Kees Akerboom may refer to:

- Kees Akerboom, Jr. (born 1983), Dutch basketball player
- Kees Akerboom, Sr. (born 1952), Dutch basketball player
