= Gary Freeman (basketball) =

American basketball player

Personal information
- Born: July 25, 1948 (age 78) Boise, Idaho, U.S.
- Listed height: 6 ft 9 in (2.06 m)
- Listed weight: 210 lb (95 kg)

Career information
- High school: Borah (Boise, Idaho)
- College: Oregon State (1967–1970)
- NBA draft: 1970: 1st round, 16th overall pick
- Drafted by: Milwaukee Bucks
- Playing career: 1970–1980
- Position: Power forward
- Number: 21, 17, 23

Career history
- 1970–1971: Milwaukee Bucks
- 1971: Cleveland Cavaliers
- 1973–1975: The Lions Zandvoort
- 1975–1978: Flamingo's Haarlem
- 1978–1979: Rotterdam-Zuid
- 1979–1981: Liège

Career highlights
- 4× First-team All-Eredivisie (1974–1976, 1978); Second-team All-Pac-8 (1969)
- Stats at NBA.com
- Stats at Basketball Reference

Gary C. Freeman (born July 25, 1948) is an American former National Basketball Association (NBA) player from 1970 to 1971. He played in college for Oregon State University and was selected by the Milwaukee Bucks in the first round (16th overall) of the 1970 NBA draft and by the Carolina Cougars in the 1970 ABA Draft.

Freeman played in 41 games for the Milwaukee Bucks and 11 games for the Cleveland Cavaliers.

== Career statistics ==
Legend
GP	Games played	GS	Games started	MPG	Minutes per game
FG%	Field goal percentage	3P%	3-point field goal percentage	FT%	Free throw percentage
RPG	Rebounds per game	APG	Assists per game	SPG	Steals per game
BPG	Blocks per game	PPG	Points per game	**Bold**	Career high

=== NBA ===
==== Regular season ====
Year	Team	GP	MPG	FG%	FT%	RPG	APG	PPG
1970–71	Milwaukee	**41**	**8.2**	.508	**.737**	**2.4**	**.8**	**3.7**
1970–71	Cleveland	11	4.3	**.583**	.500	.7	.4	1.4
Career		52	7.3	.515	.725	2.0	.7	3.2
