= 2009–10 NBB Cup =

NBB Cup
- Season: 2009–10
- Games played: 52
- Teams: 48

Finals
- Champions: ZZ Leiden (2nd title)
- Runners-up: ABC Amsterdam

The 2009–10 NBB Cup was the 42nd season of the Dutch NBB Cup. The season began on 9 October 2009 and finished with the final, which was played on 24 March 2010 in the Topsportcentrum in Almere.

ZZ Leiden won the final from ABC Amsterdam, winning its second national cup title. Danny Gibson was the top scorer in the final with 20 points. Leiden head coach Toon van Helfteren won his first NBB Cup title as a coach.

== Fourth round ==
Team 1	Score	Team 2
WCAA Giants	80–77	Matrixx Magixx
Upstairs Weert	99–73	Rotterdam Challengers
MSV Zeemacht	61–88	ABC Amsterdam
New Stars	69–87	BC Vlissingen
Binnenland	68–97	ZZ Leiden
ZZ Leiden 2	59–81	EiffelTowers Den Bosch
GasTerra Flames	90–83	De Friesland Aris
ABC Amsterdam 2	59–78	Landstede Basketbal

== Quarterfinals ==
Team 1	Agg.	Team 2	1st leg	2nd leg
WCAA Giants	163–143	Upstairs Weert	78–70	85–73
ABC Amsterdam	116–32	BC Vlissingen	116–32	–
ZZ Leiden	161–141	EiffelTowers Den Bosch	75–85	76–66
GasTerra Flames	176–102	Landstede Basketbal	80–39	96–36

== Final Four ==
=== Bracket ===
Semi-finals
27 March – Almere
WCAA Giants	98
ABC Amsterdam	99
27 March – Almere
ZZ Leiden	76
GasTerra Flames	72

Final
28 March – Almere
ABC Amsterdam	63
ZZ Leiden	88
