= 2010–11 NBB Cup =

NBB Cup
- Season: 2010–11
- Teams: 48

Finals
- Champions: GasTerra Flames (2nd title)
- Runners-up: WCAA Giants

The 2010–11 NBB Cup was the 43rd season of the Dutch NBB Cup. The championship game was played in the Topsportcentrum in Almere. GasTerra Flames won the cup, its second title ever and first one since 2005. The WCAA Giants were the runners-up after appearing in their first cup final.

== Fourth round ==
Team 1	Score	Team 2
Akrides	34–116	GasTerra Flames
Binnenland	86–72	De Hoppers
ABC Amsterdam	64–54	ZZ Leiden
Cangeroes Utrecht	44–93	Magixx
De Friesland Aris	90–73	Landstede
EiffelTowers Den Bosch	92–59	Rotterdam
MSV Zeemacht	58–88	WCAA Giants
Red Giants	61–67	BSW

== Quarterfinals ==
Team 1	Agg.	Team 2	1st leg	2nd leg
GasTerra Flames	220–117	Binnenland	104–46	106–71
ABC Amsterdam	123–126	Magixx	62–70	61–56
De Friesland Aris	164–189	EiffelTowers Den Bosch	75–98	91–89
WCAA Giants	142–116	BSW	67–62	54–75

== Final Four ==
=== Bracket ===
Semi-finals
25 March – Almere
GasTerra Flames	84
Magixx Playing for KidsRights	74
25 March – Almere
EiffelTowers Den Bosch	76
WCAA Giants	79

Final
27 March – Almere
GasTerra Flames	67
WCAA Giants	55
