= Marco van den Berg =

Dutch basketball player and basketball coach

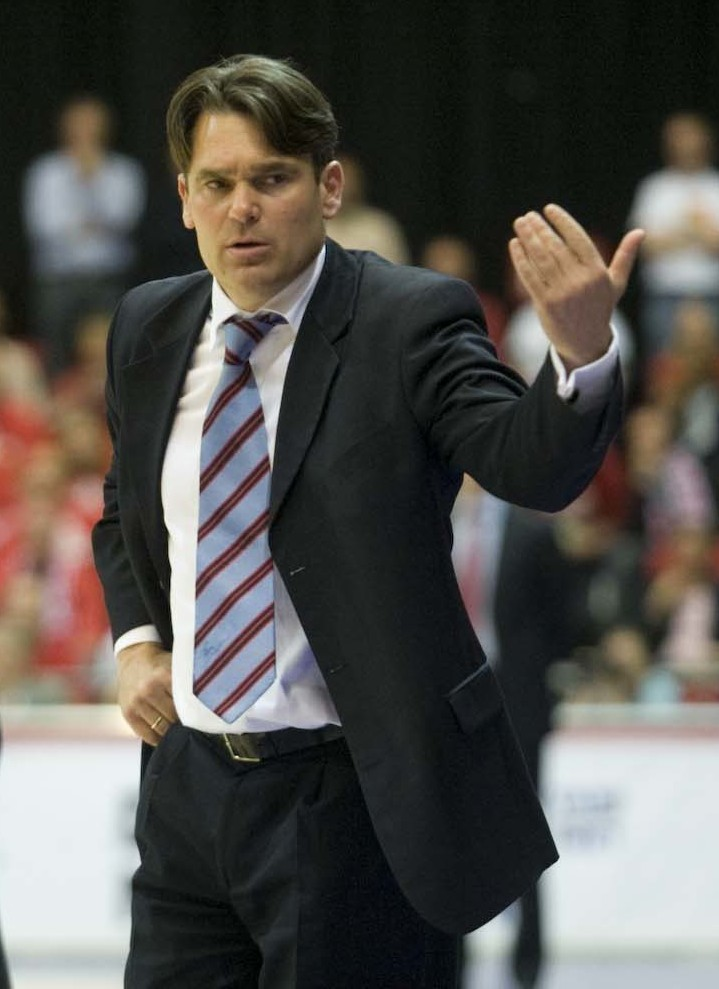
- Van den Berg coaching in 2010

Personal information
- Born: 4 June 1965 (age 61) Veenendaal, Netherlands

Career information
- Playing career: 1984–1988
- Position: Point guard
- Coaching career: 1990–present

Career history

Playing
- 1984–1987: Donar
- 1987–1988: Red Giants

Coaching
- 1990–1991: Orca's Urk
- 1993–1994: De Groene Uilen
- 1994–1995: Red Giants
- 1995–2000: The Hammers / Landstede Zwolle
- 2000–2004: EiffelTowers Nijmegen
- 2004–2008: Omniworld Almere
- 2006–2008: Netherlands
- 2008–2011: Donar
- 2011–2013: Bayreuth
- 2015–2018: Gladiators Trier
- 2018–2020: Orange Lions Academy
- 2020–2022: Gladiators Trier

Career highlights
- As coach: 2x DBL champion (2003, 2010); Dutch Cup champion (2011)

Marco van den Berg (born 4 June 1965) is a Dutch basketball coach and former player. He was most recently head coach of Gladiators Trier.

== Professional career ==
Born in Veenendaal, van den Berg played for Donar and Red Giants, both of the Eredivisie, in his career.

== Coaching career ==
In 1990, van den Berg started his coaching career.

In 2015, van den Berg was appointed as head coach of Gladiators Trier in Germany. He coached there for three seasons before leaving to coach the Orange Lions Academy program. In April 2020, he signed again with the Gladiators until 2023.
