= 2001–02 Eredivisie (basketball) =

- League: Eredivisie
- Sport: Basketball

Regular season
- Top seed: EiffelTowers Nijmegen
- Season MVP: (United States) Mack Tuck (MPC Donar)
- Top scorer: (United States) Mack Tuck (24.5) (MPC Donar)

Finals
- Champions: Ricoh Astronauts
- Runners-up: EiffelTowers Den Bosch

Dutch Basketball League seasons
- ← 2000–01 2002–03 →

The 2001–02 Eredivisie season was the 42nd season of the Eredivisie in basketball, the highest professional basketball league in the Netherlands. Ricoh Astronauts won their 4th national title.

== Regular season ==
Pos.	Team	GP	W	L	Points
Elite A
1	EiffelTowers Nijmegen	28	20	8	40
2	MPC Donar	28	18	10	36
3	Ricoh Astronauts	28	18	10	36
4	Omniworld Almere	28	16	12	32
5	Landstede Zwolle	28	15	13	30
Elite B
6	EBBC Den Bosch	28	22	6	42
7	NAC	28	14	14	28
8	Vanilla Weert	28	12	16	24
9	Noordkop Den Helder	28	11	17	22
10	Gunco Rotterdam	28	8	20	16
11	NTNT Haaglanden	28	6	22	14

== Playoffs ==
Quarterfinals
1	EiffelTowers Nijmegen	2
8	Vanilla Weert	0
4	BC Omniworld Almere	1
5	Landstede Basketbal	2
2	MPC Donar	0
7	NAC Basketbal	2
3	Ricoh Astronauts	2
6	EBBC Den Bosch	1

Semifinals
1	EiffelTowers Nijmegen	3
5	Landstede Basketbal	0
7	NAC Basketbal	0
3	Ricoh Astronauts	3

Finals
1	EiffelTowers Nijmegen	3
3	Ricoh Astronauts	4
