= Sander Hollanders =

Dutch basketball player

No. 7 – HLA Alicante
- Position: Shooting guard
- League: Primera FEB

Personal information
- Born: 13 September 2001 (age 25) Kerkrade, Netherlands
- Listed height: 1.94 m (6 ft 4 in)

Career information
- Playing career: 2017–present

Career history
- 2017–2022: BAL
- 2022–2024: Donar
- 2024–2025: Spirou
- 2025–2026: Bàsquet Girona
- 2026–present: HLA Alicante

Career highlights
- BNXT Dutch Rising Star of the Year (2022); Dutch Cup champion (2021); Kees Akerboom Trophy (2021)

Sander Harrie Annie Hollanders (born 13 September 2001) is a Dutch basketball player for HLA Alicante of the Primera FEB. Standing at 194 cm (6 ft 4 1/2 in), he plays as shooting guard. He also plays for the Netherlands national team.

== Professional career ==
=== BAL (2017–2022) ===
Born in Kerkrade, Hollanders is a product of the Basketball Academie Limburg (BAL) youth academy. He made his debut in the Dutch Basketball League (DBL) in the 2017–18 season. In January 2020, Hollanders signed an extension with BAL until 2023.

In the 2020–21 season, Hollanders had his breakout season as he averaged 14.5 points per game and also won the Kees Akerboom Trophy after making 77 three-point field goals. On 7 February, he scored a career-high 28 points in an 81–58 win over Aris Leeuwarden. On 2 May 2021, he won the 2021 DBL Cup with his team after beating Yoast United in the final. Hollanders scored 17 points in the championship game.

On 30 April 2022, Hollanders won the Dutch Rising Player of the Year award for the 2021–22 season.

=== Donar (2022–2024) ===
On 29 June 2022, Hollanders signed a two-year contract with Donar.

=== Spirou Basket (2024–2025) ===
On August 14, 2024, he signed with Spirou of the BNXT League.

Hollanders signed for Bàsquet Girona of the Liga ACB in September of 2025, staying with the Catalans until February 2026. On the same day, he signed for HLA Alicante of the Primera FEB.

== National team career ==
Hollanders played with the Netherlands Under-18 team at the 2019 FIBA U18 European Championship.

On 25 February 2023, Hollanders made his debut for the Netherlands senior team in a home game against Georgia.
