= Jerry Beck (basketball) =

American basketball player (born 1957)

Personal information
- Born: November 13, 1957 (age 69) Danville, Virginia, U.S.
- Listed height: 6 ft 7 in (2.01 m)
- Listed weight: 200 lb (91 kg)

Career information
- High school: George Washington (Danville, Virginia)
- College: Middle Tennessee (1978–1982)
- NBA draft: 1982: 4th round, 89th overall pick
- Drafted by: Milwaukee Bucks
- Playing career: 1982–2001
- Position: Small forward / power forward

Career history
- 1983–1985: Leiden
- 1986–1987: EBBC Den Bosch
- 1987–1988: Hatrans Haaksbergen
- 1988–1991: DAS Delft
- 1993–1994; 1996–1999: Den Helder

Career highlights
- 2× Eredivisie champion (1987, 1998); Eredivisie MVP (1984); Eredivisie All-Star (1984); 2× First-Team All-Eredivisie (1984, 1985); 2× OVC Player of the Year (1981, 1982); 3× First-team All-OVC (1980–1982)
- Stats at Basketball Reference

Jerry Beck (born November 13, 1957) is an American former professional basketball player. During the 1980s and 1990s, he played in the Netherlands but is better known for his collegiate career at Middle Tennessee State University. Between 1978–79 and 1981–82, Beck scored 1,401 points, grabbed 782 rebounds and was twice named the Ohio Valley Conference Men's Basketball Player of the Year. In addition, Beck was selected three straight years to the All-OVC First Team.

A 6 ft 7 in (2.01 m) multi-position player who primarily switched between small forward and power forward, Beck led the Blue Raiders to the school's first ever NCAA Tournament appearance in 1982. In a first round match-up against perennial title contender Kentucky, he recorded a double-double with 14 points and 10 rebounds to lead MT to arguably its biggest win in school history. They defeated the Wildcats, 50–44, thereby spoiling a much-anticipated second round match-up between Kentucky and Louisville. The Blue Raiders lost to Louisville by 25 points the following game.

Years later, in a Murfreesboro Post column that ranked the top ten men's basketball players in MT history, they selected Beck as the #1 greatest player. Following college, the Milwaukee Bucks selected him in the fourth round (89th overall) in the 1982 NBA draft, although Beck decided to play internationally in the Netherlands. He played in the Netherlands until age 42, at which point he retired and became a permanent resident in Amsterdam.
