= Donnell Thomas =

American basketball player (born 1968)

Personal information
- Born: December 21, 1968 (age 57) Chicago, Illinois, U.S.
- Listed height: 196 cm (6 ft 5 in)
- Listed weight: 95 kg (209 lb)

Career information
- College: Northern Illinois (1987–1991)
- NBA draft: 1991: undrafted
- Playing career: 1992–2001
- Position: Small forward / power forward

Career history
- 1992: Nelson Giants
- 1995–1998: Donar
- 1998–1999: Maccabi Hadera
- 1999–2000: Den Helder
- 2000: Ural Great Perm
- 2000–2001: Ben Hur

Career highlights
- NZNBL All-Star Five (1992); NZNBL Most Outstanding Forward (1992); Eredivisie MVP (1998); 3× First-team All-Eredivisie (1996–1998); 2× Eredivisie scoring champion (1997, 1998)

Donnell Lee Thomas (born December 21, 1968) is an American former basketball player. Standing at 196 cm, he played as small forward or power forward.

== College career ==
Thomas played college basketball for the Northern Illinois Huskies men's basketball team, where he was nicknamed "D-Train", for his rebounding ability. He led the team in scoring for three straight years and ended his NIU career as the team's second-highest scoring leader of all time. He was inducted in the NIU Huskies' Hall of Fame in 2003.

== Professional career ==
In 1992, Thomas played with the Nelson Giants of New Zealand's National Basketball League. He was named to the league's All-Star Five and was honoured as the Best Forward of the Commissioners Cup.

From 1995 to 1998, Thomas played for Donar in the Dutch Eredivisie. He was the league's Most Valuable Player in the 1997–98 season. Thomas was also named to the All-Eredivisie First Team three times (from 1996 to 1998). He also led the league in scoring in 1997 and 1998, becoming the second player in league history to do so, after Maurice Smith in 1991.

For the 1998–99 season, Thomas played in Israel for Maccabi Hadera. In the 1999–2000 season, he played for Den Helder. He averaged 22.7 points in 96 Eredivisie games played. He also played for Ural Great Perm in Russia that year, averaging 11.2 points in 19 games played.

For the 2000–01 season, Thomas played in Argentina for Ben Hur.
