= DAS Delft =

- League: Lower District Regions
- Founded: 1968
- History: DAS Delft (1968–present)
- Arena: Sporthal SC Delfland; Sporthal Piet Vink
- Location: Delft, Netherlands
- Team colours: Blue and white

DAS Delft is a Dutch basketball team based in Delft. During the 1980s and 1990s, they played in the top flight Eredivisie; today they play in the lower regional districts of Dutch basketball.

== History ==
The team was founded in August 1968 as Delft All-Stars (DAS), by a gymnastic teacher named Kooperdraat and started with a group of players who were mostly footballers. DAS was the first non-student basketball club in the city. The first games were played in the sports hall in the Steenwijklaan in The Hague and played with white shirts and blue shorts. In 1986, DAS made its debut in the Eredivisie and finished in 8th place. In the following five seasons, the team also played in the Eredivisie; its best performance was the 7th place in 1988–89. Three players were named to the league's All-Star Team in these years: Carl Lott (1988), Bud Greer (1990) and Lamont Randolph (1992). Delft native and former league MVP Toon van Helfteren also played four years for the team. Additionally, DAS was the runner-up of the 1990–91 NBB Cup after losing in two games to Akrides.

== Honours ==
NBB Cup

- Runners-up (1): 1990–91

== Notable players ==
- Jerry Beck
- Bud Greer
- Toon van Helfteren
- Carl Lott
- Lamont Randolph

== Coaches ==
- Toon van Helfteren: (1990–1992)
