= DBV Rowic =

Dutch basketball team based in Dordrecht

Rowic
- League: Eerste divisie
- Founded: 1 April 1964; 61 years ago
- Location: Dordrecht, Netherlands

D.B.V. Rowic is a Dutch basketball team based in Dordrecht. Founded on 1 April 1964, the team played in the first-level Eredivisie during the 1970s and 1980s. The team was known as Frisol/Rowic for sponsorships reasons, playing in green jerseys as this was the sponsor's color. After Frisol stopped as main sponsor, the team played in the second-tier Eerste Divisie. Rowic won the NBB Cup in 1981, under the sponsored named "Snel Reizen".

In 2018, a new professional team from Dordrecht played in the Dutch Basketball League with Dutch Windmills. The Windmills played in the DBL in just one season, and had to withdraw during the season due to financial issues.

== Honours ==
NBB Cup

- Champions (1): 1980–81

== Sponsorship names ==
Due to numerous sponsorship deals, Rowic knew the following names:

- Frisol/Rowic: (1972–1981)
- Snel Reizen: (1981–1982)
- Kador/Rowic: (1982–1984)

== Players ==
=== All-time leaders ===
From the Dutch Basketball federation database.

Games played

1. Hans Heijdeman (63)
2. Jimmy Moore (61)
3. Rick Lewis (54)
4. René Ridderhof (52)
5. Jelmer Schouten (51)

Points scored

1. Jimmy Moore (1,373)
2. Rick Lewis (1,093)
3. René Ridderhof (943)
4. David Moore (848)
5. Hans Heijdeman (816)

=== Individual awards ===
DBL All-Star Team
- Jimmy Moore – 1979, 1981
