= Joe Spinks =

American basketball player and coach

Personal information
- Born: June 20, 1972 (age 54) Asheboro, North Carolina, U.S.
- Listed height: 6 ft 6 in (1.98 m)

Career information
- High school: Asheboro (Asheboro, North Carolina)
- College: Campbell (1990–1994)
- NBA draft: 1994: undrafted
- Playing career: 1994–2006
- Position: Small forward
- Number: 34, 8
- Coaching career: 2006–present

Career history

Playing
- 1994–1995: Södertälje
- 1995–1996: Lahti
- 1996–1997: Vilvoorde
- 1997–1998: Illiabum
- 1998–2006: Ricoh Astronauts Amsterdam

Coaching
- 2006: MyGuide Amsterdam (interim head coach)
- 2006–2008: Amsterdam (assistant coach)
- 2011–present: Eastern Guilford HS

Career highlights
- 6× DBL champion (1999–2002, 2005, 2008); 2× DBL Most Valuable Player (2000, 2003); 4× All-DBL Team (2000, 2001, 2003, 2004); Big South Player of the Year (1994)

Joseph S. Spinks (born June 20, 1972) is an American-Dutch retired basketball player and coach. He played eight seasons for ABC Amsterdam in the Netherlands and is considered one of the best players to have played in the Eredivisie. Spinks also was head coach and assistant coach for Amsterdam for two years. Spink's nickname during his playing career was "the Bull".

== College career ==
Spinks played for Campbell from 1990 to 1994, and helped the Fighting Camels to their first-ever NCAA tournament berth in 1994. In 2010, he was inducted into the Campbell Sports Hall of Fame.

== Professional career ==
Spinks started his career in 1994 with Södertälje BBK of the Swedish Basketligan. In the following season, he played with Namika Lahti in the Finnish Korisliiga.

In 1996, Spinks had the opportunity to play work out for the Miami Heat of the National Basketball Association (NBA), however, after a torn achilles.

After stints in Belgium and Portugal, he arrived to the Amsterdam Astronauts in 1998. He would stay on the team for 12 seasons, becoming a star player and helping the team win as much as six Dutch national championships. Spinks retired from playing at age 33 due to a knee injury.

== Coaching career ==
In 2006, Spinks took over as interim head coach of the Amsterdam Astronauts and guided them to the league semifinals. In the following two years, he was an assistant coach on the Amsterdam team that won two more Eredivisie titles. Spinks returned with his family to the United States in 2009. Spinks is currently the boys head coach at Eastern Guilford High School in Greensboro, North Carolina.

== Honors ==
=== Professional ===
Astronauts Amsterdam

- 6× Dutch Championship (1999, 2000, 2001, 2002, 2005, 2008)
- 2× Dutch Cup (2004, 2006)
- 2× DBL Most Valuable Player (2000, 2003)
- 4× All-DBL Team (2000, 2001, 2003, 2004)
- DBL Playoffs MVP(2005)
- FEB Cup MVP (2003)
- 2× DBL All-Star (2000, 2001)

=== College ===
- Big South Conference Player of the Year (1994)
- Big South Conference Rookie of the Year (1991)
- 3× First Team All-Big South Conference (1992, 1993, 1994)
- Second Team All-Big South Conference (1991)
- Campbell University Hall of Fame (2010)

== Personal ==
Spinks is married to Dawn Gibson and has a son, Jonathan. Spinks is a Christian.
