= Hank Smith (basketball) =

Dutch basketball player (born 1946)

Personal information
- Born: January 18, 1946 (age 80)
- Listed height: 6 ft 7 in (2.01 m)

Career information
- Playing career: 1972–1991
- Position: Forward

Career history
- 1972–1974: Flamingo's Haarlem
- 1974–1983: Canadians Amsterdam
- 1998–1999: SV Argon

Career highlights
- Eredivisie champion (1973); Eredivisie MVP (1976); 2× First-team All-Eredivisie (1974, 1976); 3× Eredivisie All-Defensive Team (1974–1976); 7× Eredivisie All-Star Game (1974–1976, 1978, 1979, 1981, 1982); Eredivisie All-Star Game MVP (1979)

Hank Smith (born January 18, 1946) is a Dutch former basketball player. He played as a 2.01 metres (6 ft 7 in) forward.

Smith played in the Dutch top division Eredivisie for 27 seasons, including for Flamingo's Haarlem (1972 to 1974), Canadians Amsterdam (1974 to 1983) and SV Argon (1998–99). Smith averaged 23.9 points per game in 297 Eredivisie games. He was named the MVP of the league in the 1975–76 season. Smith was selected for the Dutch League All-Star Game six times and was the game's MVP in 1979.
