= Jimmy Moore (basketball, born 1952) =

American basketball player (born 1952)

Personal information
- Born: January 13, 1952 (age 74) Leakesville, Mississippi, U.S.
- Listed height: 6 ft 7 in (2.01 m)
- Listed weight: 195 lb (88 kg)

Career information
- High school: Leakesville High School (Leakesville, Mississippi)
- College: Utah State (1972–1975)
- NBA draft: 1975: 4th round, 66th overall pick
- Drafted by: Seattle SuperSonics
- Playing career: 1975–1987
- Position: Power forward
- Coaching career: 1987–1992

Career history

Playing
- 1975–1977: Arke Stars Enschede
- 1977–1979: Frisol Rowic
- 1979–1981: Donar
- 1983–1987: Canadians Amsterdam

Coaching
- 1987–1992: Utah State (assistant)

Career highlights
- Eredivisie MVP (1977); 4× First-team All-Eredivisie (1977, 1981, 1982, 1985); Eredivisie All-Defensive Team (1977)
- Stats at Basketball Reference

Jimmy "Shimmy" Moore (born January 13, 1952) is an American former basketball player and author. He played college basketball with the Utah State and later worked as assistant coach and administrator for the university.

During the 1970s and 1980s, Moore played professionally in the Dutch Eredivisie for several clubs. Standing at 2.01 m (6 ft 7 in), Moore played as power forward.

== Early life ==
Moore grew up in Leakesville, Mississippi as the son of a pulpwood worker and domestic servant and grew up with 11 siblings. As a kid, he was diagnosed with rheumatoid arthritis but eventually recovered.

He attended Leakesville High School, where he experienced regular racism.

== College career ==
Moore played for Utah State for three seasons from 1972 to 1975 after he was recruited by coach Dale Brown. He recorded 30 straight double-double games in his career. As a senior, Moore scored a career-high 40 points against Wyoming. Moore was named to the Aggies' All-Century Team in 2005, and was inducted into the Aggies' Hall of Fame in 2013.

== Professional career ==
Moore was drafted in the 1975 NBA draft by the Seattle SuperSonics with the 66th overall pick in the fourth round. He never played a game in the National Basketball Association (NBA).

Moore played for Arke Stars Enschede (1975 to 1977), Frisol Rowic (1977 to 1979), Donar (1979 to 1981), Canadians Amsterdam (1983 to 1987). He was named the Eredivisie Most Valuable Player (MVP) in the 1976–77 season during his time with Enschede.

== Post-playing career ==
After his playing career, Moore returned to Utah State to serve as assistant coach under Rod Tueller in 1987 and remained for five seasons. After that, he became an administrator at USU where he was the director of admissions.

== Personal ==
Moore has two sons, Grayson and Jalen who both played basketball for Utah State as well. He obtained a bachelor's degree in physical education during his college career and a Master's degree in education after his playing days. In 2020, Moore released a book named "Basketball and Some of Life’s Technical Fouls", in which he writes about his life, basketball career and institutional racism.

== Publications ==
- Moore, Jimmy (2020). Basketball and Some of Life's Technical Fouls. Newman Springs Publishing, Inc. ISBN 1645317307.
