= James Lister (basketball) =

American basketball player

Personal information
- Born: December 7, 1951 Dallas, Texas, U.S.
- Died: 2010 (aged 58–59) Fort Worth, Texas, U.S.
- Listed height: 6 ft 10 in (2.08 m)
- Listed weight: 210 lb (95 kg)

Career information
- College: Sam Houston (1969–1973)
- NBA draft: 1973: 3rd round, 41st overall pick
- Drafted by: Cleveland Cavaliers
- Playing career: 1977–1981
- Position: Center
- Number: 21

Career history
- 1977–1978: Le Mans
- 1978–1980: EBBC Den Bosch
- 1980–1981: Pallacanestro Pordenone
- 1981: CDCP Road Builders

Career highlights
- Eredivisie champion (1979); Eredivisie MVP (1979); 2× First-team All-Eredivisie (1979, 1980)
- Stats at Basketball Reference

James Lister (born July 12, 1951 – 2010) was an American basketball player. He was a 2.08 metres (6 ft 10 in) tall center.

== College career ==
Lister played collegiate for Sam Houston State and was inducted to the team's Hall of Honour in 1981. He is the all-time leading scorer for the Bearkats with 2,304 points (21.9 per game), as well as the all-time leading rebounder with 1,682 boards (16.0 per game). Lister scored a school record 47 points against East Texas in 1971.

== Professional career ==
Lister was selected by the Cleveland Cavaliers in the third round of the 1973 NBA draft with the 41st overall pick. From 1978 to 1980, Lister played in the Netherlands for Nashua Den Bosch, where he averaged 12.0 points over 83 games and was named the Most Valuable Player of the 1978–79 season.

He played for the CDCP Road Builders of the Philippine Basketball Association (PBA) in their 1981 season. He averaged 22.2 points in 7 played games.

== Personal ==
James was the brother of Alton Lister, who is also a former basketball player and current coach.

Lister died in Fort Worth, Texas 2010 at age 59.
