= Richard van Poelgeest =

Dutch basketball player (born 1966)

Personal information
- Born: 23 March 1966 (age 60) Rijswijk, Netherlands
- Listed height: 205 cm (6 ft 9 in)

Career information
- College: Nebraska (1986–1990)
- NBA draft: 1990: undrafted
- Playing career: 1985–2005
- Position: Center

Career history
- 1984–1985: Leiden
- 1985–1986: Canadians
- 1990–1994: BSW Weert
- 1994–1996: Goba Gorinchem
- 1996–2001: Oostende
- 2001–2002: Leuven
- 2002–2005: BSW Weert

Career highlights
- Dutch League champion (1994); Dutch League MVP (1994); NBB Cup champion (1995)

Richard van Poelgeest (born 23 March 1966) is a Dutch former basketball player. He played for several clubs in the Netherlands and Belgium in his career. He was also a member of the Netherlands national basketball team.

== Career ==
Van Poelgeest started his professional career in 1984 with Elmex Leiden in the Eredivisie, the highest league in the Netherlands.

Van Poelgeest played college basketball in the United States for the Nebraska Cornhuskers starting from 1986. His career high was 19 points against Iowa State on 26 February 1988.

After college, he returned to the Netherlands to play for BSW Weert, at the time named Selex Weert. In 1994, he won the club's first Dutch championship with Weert. He was also named the Most Valuable Player of the 1993–94 season.

From 1994 until 1996, Van Poelgeest played for Goba Gorinchem. With Goba, he won the NBB Cup in 1995.

For the last three years of his professional career, he returned to BSW Weert.

After, he played at a semi-professional level with Hasselt in the Belgian Second Division.

== National team career ==
With the Netherlands national team, Van Poelgeest played at EuroBasket 1989.
