= DBL Most Valuable Player Award =

Dutch annual basketball award

The Dutch Basketball League Most Valuable Player Award is an annual award given to the most valuable player in the Dutch highest professional basketball league. The award is given after the regular season and was first handed out in 1974.

Six Dutch players have won the award so far, with Emmanuel Nzekwesi being the last winner in 2021. Kees Akerboom, Sr. (1980, 1981, 1985) and Leon Rodgers (2005–2007) are the all-time leaders in Dutch MVP awards.

== Winners ==
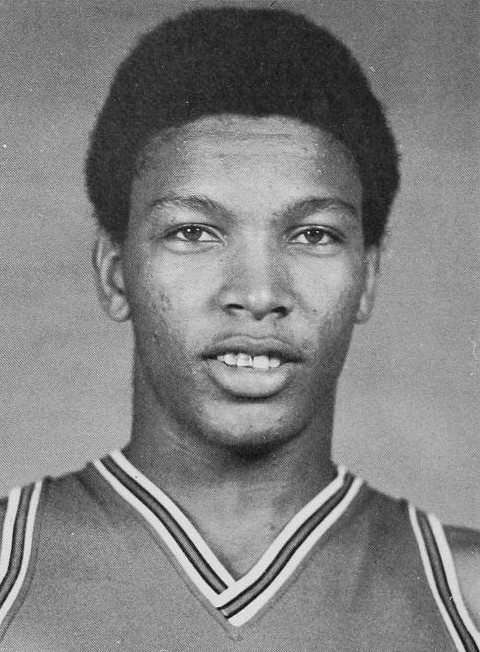
Wilson Washington was MVP in 1982

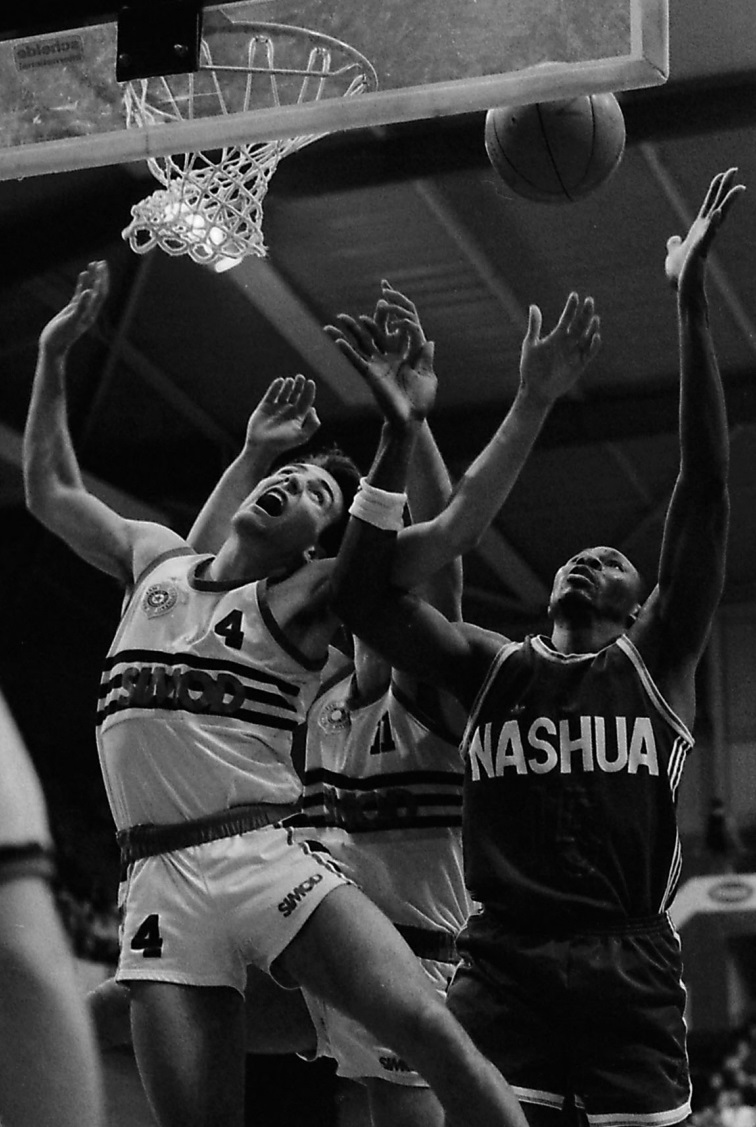
Mike Reddick (to the right of Aleksandar Đorđević) won MVP in 1988

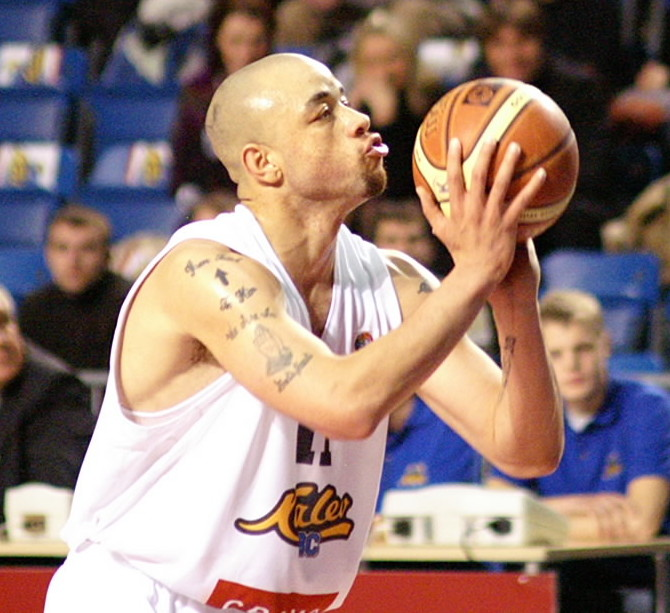
Travis Reed won the award in 2004

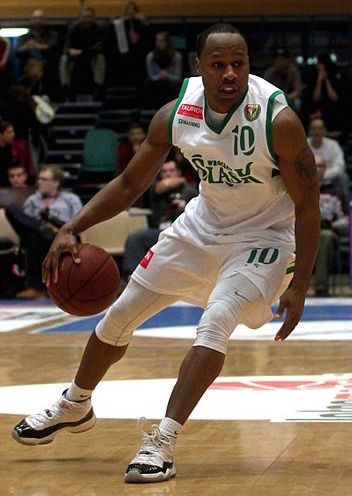
Leiden's Danny Gibson was MVP in 2010.

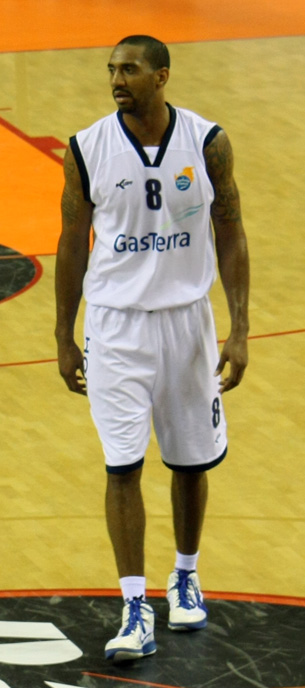
Jason Dourisseau won the award in 2011.

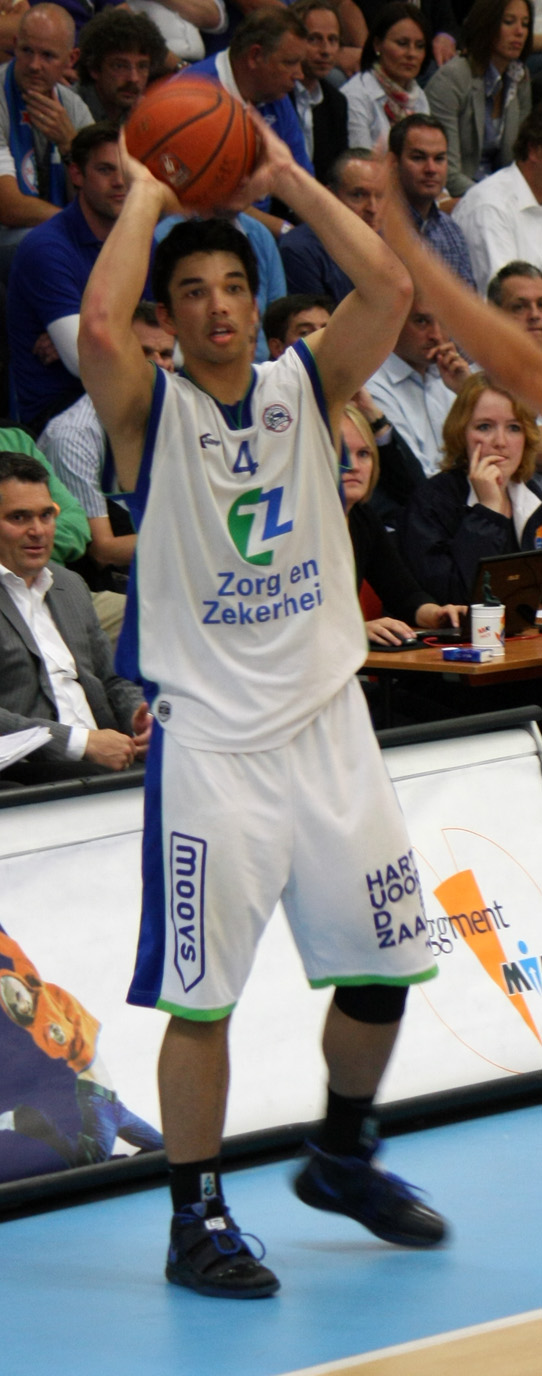
Arvin Slagter won the award in the 2013–14 season.

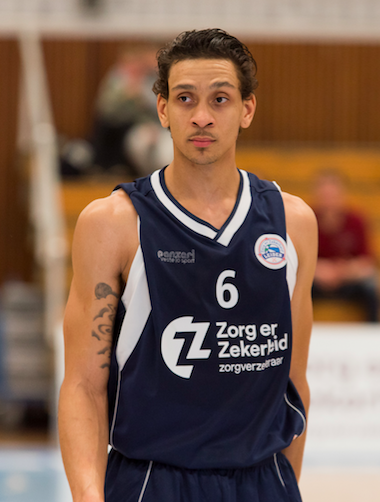
Worthy de Jong was the Most Valuable Player in 2016.

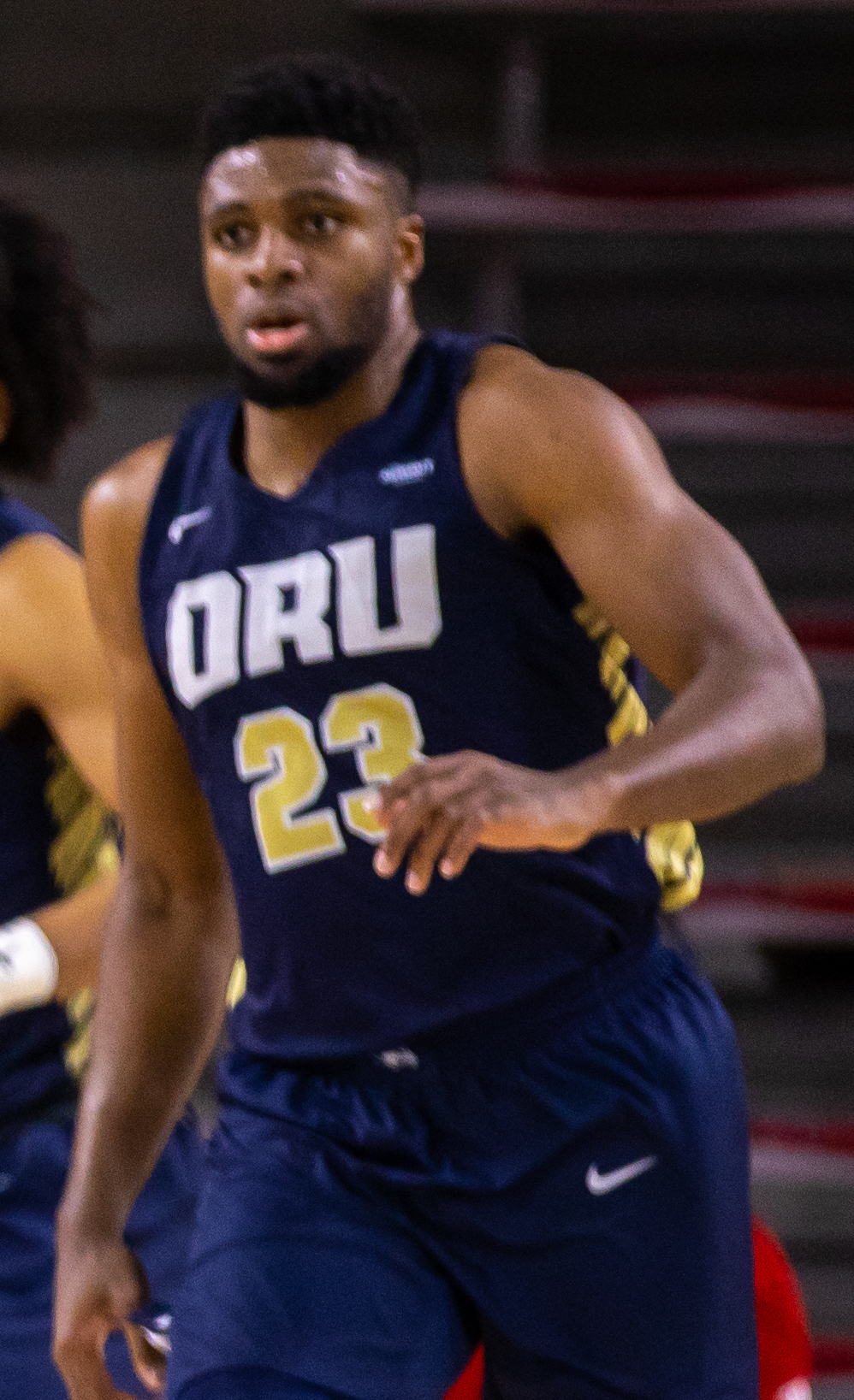
Emmanuel Nzekwesi, winner in 2021.

Key
Player (X)	Name of the player and number of times they had won the award at that point (if more than one)
Club (X)	Name of the club and the number of times a player of it has won the award (if more than one)
†	Denotes player whose team won championship that year
	Denotes player who is still active in the DBL

Season	Player	Position	Nationality	Club	Ref
1974–75†	Harry Rogers	Forward	United States	Punch	
1975–76	Hank Smith	Forward	Netherlands	Canadians Amsterdam	
1976–77	Jimmy Moore	Forward	United States	Arke Stars Enschede	
1977–78†	Art Collins	Guard	United States	Leiden	
1978–79†	James Lister	Center	United States	EBBC Den Bosch	
1979–80	Kees Akerboom Sr.	Guard	Netherlands	EBBC Den Bosch (2)	
1980–81†	Kees Akerboom Sr. (2)	Guard	Netherlands	EBBC Den Bosch (3)	
1981–82	Wilson Washington	Center	United States	BV Amstelveen	
1982–83	David Lawrence	Forward	United States	Donar	
1983–84	Jerry Beck	Forward	United States	Leiden (2)	
1984–85†	Kees Akerboom Sr. (3)	Guard	Netherlands	EBBC Den Bosch (4)	
1985–86	Toon van Helfteren	Forward	Netherlands	Leiden (3)	
1986–87	José Waitman	Forward	United States	Den Helder	
1987–88†	Mike Reddick	Center	United States	EBBC Den Bosch (5)	
1988–89	Rob Jones	Center	United States	Red Giants Meppel	
1989–90	Kevin McDuffie	Center	United States	BS Weert	
1990–91	Lenzie Howell	Forward	United States	Red Giants Meppel (2)	
1991–92	Lenzie Howell (2)	Forward	United States	Red Giants Meppel (3)	
1992–93	Jack Jennings	Forward	United States (Note: Jennings also held the Israeli nationality.)	Donar (2)	
1993–94†	Richard van Poelgeest	Center	Netherlands	BS Weert (2)	
1994–95	Sonique Nixon	Center	United States	BS Weert (3)	
1995–96	Michael Huger	Guard	United States	Rotterdam	
1996–97†	Marcel Huijbens	Center	Netherlands	EBBC Den Bosch (6)	
1997–98	Donnell Thomas	Forward	United States	Donar (3)	
1998–99	Ralph Biggs	Forward	United States	BS Weert (4)	
1999–00†	Joe Spinks	Guard	United States (Note: Spinks later became a Dutch citizen.)	Astronauts Amsterdam (2)	
2000–01†	Chris McGuthrie	Guard	United States	Astronauts Amsterdam (3)	
2001–02	Mack Tuck	Forward	United States	Donar (4)	
2002–03	Joe Spinks (2)	Guard	United States	Astronauts Amsterdam (4)	
2003–04†	Travis Reed	Forward/center	United States	Donar (5)	
2004–05	Leon Rodgers	Forward	United States (Note: Rodgers became a naturalised Venezuelan in 2016.)	EiffelTowers Nijmegen	
2005–06†	Leon Rodgers (2)	Forward	United States	Den Bosch (7)	
2006–07†	Leon Rodgers (3)	Forward	United States	Den Bosch (8)	
2007–08†	Peter van Paassen	Center	Netherlands	Amsterdam (5)	
2008–09†	Peter van Paassen (2)	Center	Netherlands	Amsterdam (6)	
2009–10	Danny Gibson	Guard	United States	Leiden (4)	
2010–11	Jason Dourisseau	Forward	United States (Note: Dourisseau became Dutch citizen in 2015.)	Donar (6)	
2011–12	Seamus Boxley	Forward	United States	Leiden (5)	
2012–13	Andre Young	Guard	United States	Den Bosch (9)	
2013–14†	Arvin Slagter	Guard	Netherlands	Donar (7)	
2014–15	Lance Jeter	Guard	United States	Donar (8)	
2015–16	Worthy de Jong	Guard	Netherlands	ZZ Leiden (6)	
2016–17†	Lance Jeter (2)	Guard	United States	Donar (9)	
2017–18†	Brandyn Curry	Guard	United States	Donar (10)	
2018–19	Darius Thompson	Guard	United States	ZZ Leiden (7)	
2020–21†	Emmanuel Nzekwesi	Center	Netherlands	ZZ Leiden (8)	

== Awards by player ==
Player	Total	Years
(Netherlands) Kees Akerboom	3	1980, 1981, 1985
(United States) Leon Rodgers	3	2005, 2006, 2007
(United States) Lenzie Howell	2	1991, 1992
(Netherlands) Lance Jeter	2	2015, 2017
(Netherlands) Peter van Paassen	2	2008, 2009
(United States) (Netherlands) Joe Spinks	2	2000, 2003

== Awards won by nationality ==
Country	Total
United States	34
Netherlands	11
