= Ralph Biggs =

American-born Belgian basketball player

Personal information
- Born: February 6, 1976 (age 50) Washington, North Carolina, U.S.
- Listed height: 6 ft 7 in (2.01 m)
- Listed weight: 176 lb (80 kg)

Career information
- High school: Washington (Washington, North Carolina)
- College: Towson (1994–1998)
- NBA draft: 1998: undrafted
- Playing career: 1998–2014
- Position: Guard

Career history
- 1998–1999: BSW Weert
- 1999–2003: Telindus Oostende
- 2003–2004: Liège Basket
- 2004–2007: Spirou Charleroi
- 2007–2009: Ural Great Perm
- 2009–2010: Krasnye Krylia
- 2010–2011: Limoges CSP
- 2011–2013: Antwerp Giants
- 2013–2014: Wolves Verviers-Pepinster

Career highlights
- Dutch League MVP (1999); Belgian League MVP (2002)

Ralph Nehimiah Biggs (born February 6, 1976) is an American-born naturalized Belgian former professional basketball player. Biggs is 2.01 m tall and played the small forward position.

== Career ==
He played for PBC Ural Great in the Russian Super League. He played college basketball at Towson University. He played in Ostende, Charleroi, Liège and Antwerp (all Belgian teams).

Biggs led the 2000–01 Euroleague in steals per game averaging 2.1. He competed for two seasons at the Euroleague level in 2000–01 and 2001–02 with Telindus Oostende.

In the 2010/11 season he played for French club Limoges CSP Elite.

In February 2011 he signed with Antwerp Giants. In June 2013, Biggs signed a one-year deal with VOO Wolves Verviers-Pepinster.

Biggs is currently the head girls' basketball coach at his native Washington High School in Beaufort County, North Carolina. He was named 2-A Eastern Plains Conference coach of the year after his first season. After taking over coaching duties for the boys' team midway through the 2016 season, Biggs became the full-time coach for both varsity squads in 2017.
