= Travis Young =

American basketball player (born 1979)

Personal information
- Born: March 14, 1979 (age 47) Columbus, Ohio, U.S.
- Listed height: 6 ft 1 in (1.85 m)
- Listed weight: 200 lb (91 kg)

Career information
- High school: Zanesville (Zanesville, Ohio)
- College: Marshall (1997–2001)
- NBA draft: 2001: undrafted
- Playing career: 2001–2009
- Position: Point guard / shooting guard
- Number: 3, 8

Career history
- 2001–2002: Landstede
- 2002–2003: Omniworld Almere
- 2003–2006: Donar
- 2006–2009: Den Bosch

Career highlights
- 2× Eredivisie champion (2004, 2007); 2× Dutch Cup winner (2005, 2008); 5× Eredivisie All-Star Team (2003–2007); Kees Akerboom Trophy (2007); First-team All-MAC (2001); MAC Freshman of the Year (1998)

Travis Anthony Young (born March 14, 1979) is an American former basketball player. Standing at 1.85 m, he was a point guard. During the 2000s, Young played in the Dutch Eredivisie for Landstede (2001–02), Omniworld Almere (2002–03), Donar (2003 to 2006) and EiffelTowers Den Bosch (2006 to 2009). Young was also named to the league's All-Star Team five times.

== High school and college career ==
Born in Columbus, Ohio, Young played high school basketball for Zanesville High School, before playing four season in college for Marshall. He was the Mid-American Conference (MAC) Freshman of the Year and garnered all-conference honours as a senior. After leaving Marshall, he was the school's third leader of all-time in steals. Young was inducted into the Marshall University Athletics Hall of Fame in 2022.

== Professional career ==
Young began his career with Landstede in the 2001–02 season and averaged 22.2 points on 63.3% field goal shooting in his rookie year. In the following season, he played for Omniworld Almere, where Young averaged 20.8 points and 4.9 rebounds per game.

In 2003, Young signed for Donar. He won his first national championship in 2004, averaging 16.4 points per game over the season. In December 2005, he resigned from the club after claimed unprofessional behaviour while recovering from his injury. Young returned two months later, in January, as a reported dispute with Donar's board was resolved.

In July 2006, Young signed with rival EiffelTowers Den Bosch, signing a one-year contract. On November 5, 2006, Young scored a career-high 48 points for Den Bosch in a 120–103 win over Donar. In the 2006–07 season, Young played in the 2006–07 ULEB Cup with EiffelTowers. He helped the team beat Real Madrid 84–77, scoring 25 points in the encounter. In September 2008, Young and EiffelTowers agreed to end his contract after he suffered multiple injuries.

In January 2009, Young signed with Anwil Wloclawek. However, in February, Young announced his retirement from basketball in a letter to the website Eurobasket.com.
