= Sonique Nixon =

American basketball player

Sonique Nixon (born 1971) is an American former basketball player. Standing at 6 ft 8 in (2.03 m), he played as a center. Nixon played for UMBC from 1991 to 1994, averaging 14.1 points and 9.1 rebounds in his career with the Retrievers.

Nixon played in the Dutch Eredivisie with BS Weert in 1994–95 season. He was named the league's Most Valuable Player, after averaging 19.1 points per game. Nixon later also played for KTP Basket in the Finnish Korisliiga.
