= Lamont Randolph =

American former basketball player

Personal information
- Born: June 9, 1967 (age 59) New York City, New York
- Listed height: 6 ft 6 in (1.98 m)
- Listed weight: 229 lb (104 kg)

Career information
- College: Tulsa (1988–1990)
- NBA draft: 1990: undrafted
- Position: Small forward / power forward

Career history
- 1990–1991: DAS Delft
- 1991–1992: Red Giants Meppel
- 1993–1994: Caen
- 1994–1996: Aix Maurienne
- 1999–2002: Donar
- 2002: Red Giants Meppel
- 2002–2003: NAC Breda
- 2004–2005: Aris Leeuwarden

Lamont Randolph (born June 9, 1967) is an American former basketball player. He was a 2.00 m (6 ft 6 in) and 104 kg (229 lbs) small forward or power forward.

== College career ==
Randolph played college basketball with Tulsa for two seasons between 1988 and 1990. He averaged 12.3 points and 7.1 rebounds in 30.7 minutes per game for the Golden Hurricane.

== Professional career ==
Randolph made his debut in the Dutch Eredivisie with DAS Delft in 1990–91, averaging 20 points in 7 games. In the following season, he played with Red Giants Meppel where he averaged 25.8 points per game. From 1993 to 1996, Randolph played in the French second-tier LNB Pro B for Cean (1993–94) and Aix Maurienne Savoie Basket (1994 to 1996). From 1999, he played three seasons for Donar. In August 2002, he signed a short-term contract with Red Giants Meppel of the Dutch second-tier Promotiedivisie. The next years, Randolph would play for NAC Breda (2002–03) and Aris Leeuwarden (2004–05).
