= Jack Jennings (basketball, born 1969) =

American-Israeli basketball player (born 1969)

Jack Jennings (born October 15, 1969, in Covington, Kentucky) is an American-Israeli former basketball player. Standing at 6 ft 5 (1.96 m), he played as forward.

== High school and college career ==
Jennings played for Holmes High School of Kentucky and graduated in 1988. He averaged 34.4 points in his senior season and scored 41 points in a state tournament game. Jennings was inducted to the Greater Cincinnati Basketball Hall of Fame in 2019.

He went on to play collegiate basketball with Western Kentucky from 1990 to 1992. There, Jennings averaged 17.6 points and 7.6 rebounds over his two seasons as a started for WKU.

== Professional career ==
In the 1992–93 season, Jennings played in the Dutch Eredivisie with Donar (named VGNN Donar for sponsorship reasons). He won the Most Valuable Player award of the Eredivisie season. He averaged 26.7 points in his sole season with Donar.

Jennings also played in Turkey, Israel and Argentina later in his career.
