= Kevin McDuffie =

American basketball player (born 1965)

Personal information
- Born: July 6, 1965 (age 61)
- Listed height: 6 ft 7 in (2.01 m)
- Listed weight: 195 lb (88 kg)

Career information
- College: Northeastern (1984–1988)
- Position: Forward

Career history
- 1989–1990: BS Weert

Career highlights
- Eredivisie MVP (1989); First-team All-CAA (1988); CAA Rookie of the Year (1985)

Kevin McDuffie (born July 6, 1965) is an American former basketball player. A 6 ft 7 in (2.01 m) tall forward, he played four seasons of college basketball with Northeastern from 1984 to 1988.

== College career ==
McDuffie played four seasons for Northeastern. He was the 1984–85 Rookie of the Year of the Colonial Athletic Association (CAA), was named to the First-Team All-Conference in 1988 and was the Huskies' season MVP in 1988.

== Professional career ==
In the 1989–1990 season, McDuffie played for BS Weert (for sponsorship reasons named Miniware Weert) in the Dutch Eredivisie. He won the league's MVP award.

In 1992–93, McDuffie played in France with Toulouse in the second-tier LNB Pro B. He played for Donar in the 1993–1994 season. In 1994–95, he played with Aix Maurienne Savoie Basket.
