= Arke Stars Enschede =

Dutch defunct basketball club

Arke Stars Enschede was a Dutch professional basketball club based in Enschede. In the 1970s, the team played in the Eredivisie, the national top flight league. The team played in the Diekmanhal, which was destroyed in a fire in 2007. The Arke Stars won the NBB Cup in 1975.

The main sponsor of the team was Ferdinand Fransen, owner of travel agency Arke Reizen. The team was later renamed Arke Reizen Enschede, although local journalists refused to use the sponsored name in their coverage.

== Honours ==
NBB Cup

- Winners (1): 1974–75

== Notable players ==
- Jimmy Moore (1975–1977): Eredivisie MVP in 1977
- Dan Cramer (1977–1978): a 7-time Eredivisie champion in his career
