= ZBV The Lions =

The Lions
- Leagues: 2e divisie
- Founded: 1965
- Arena: Korver Sporthal
- Location: Zandvoort, Netherlands
- Championships: 1 NBB Cup
- Website: www.thelions.nl
Home

Zandvoortse Basketballvereniging The Lions, or simply The Lions, is a Dutch amateur basketball club based in Zandvoort. The club plays in the 2e divisie, the fourth level of Dutch basketball.

== History ==
The Lions was active as a professional team from the late 1960s until the middle 1970s in the Dutch first division, the Dutch Basketball League. The club, under the sponsorship name Mars Energie Stars, won the national cup (so called NBB-Beker) in 1972 defeated Factotum Punch 86–84 in the final that held in Haarlem. Also The Lions, had played once again in the 1969 NBB-Beker final where they lost to Flamingo's Haarlem, 37–52 in Utrecht. The 1973–74 season as Typsoos Lions the club ranked 4th in the league and won the right to participate in the 1974–75 FIBA Korać Cup. Typsoos Lions was drawn to play in the first round against Bosna and eliminated with an aggregate score 163–201 (81–79 home win and 82–122 defeat in Sarajevo).

== Honours and achievements ==
Dutch Cup

- Winners (1): 1971–72
- Runners-up (1): 1968–69

== European record ==
Season	Competition	Round	Club	Home	Away	Agg
1974–75	FIBA Korać Cup	First round	(Socialist Federal Republic of Yugoslavia) Bosna	81–79	81–122	163–201

Notes

1. The Lions points are listed first.
