= NAC Basketbal =

NAC
- Founded: 21 June 2000
- Dissolved: 10 April 2002
- Arena: Gemeentelijk Sportcentrum
- Capacity: 1,750
- Location: Breda, Netherlands
Home	Away

NAC Basketbal was a Dutch basketball club based in Breda. The club was the basketball section of the football club NAC Breda, which aimed to make itself a multi-sports club.

The team was founded in 2000, along with outspoken ambitions of playing in European competitions as well as in the Eredivisie. With head coach Jos Wolffs, the team finished fifth in Group A during the 2000–01 Eredivisie season. In its second season, NAC reached the playoff semi-finals. After financial problems during its second season, the club was dissolved in April 2002.

== Season by season ==
Key
Playoff berth

Season	Tier	League	Regular season					Playoffs	NBB Cup	Head coach
Season	Tier	League	Finish	Played	Wins	Losses	Win%	Playoffs	NBB Cup	Head coach
NAC Basketbal
2000–01	1	Eredivisie	5th	32	14	18	.438	–		Jos Wolffs
2001–02	1	Eredivisie	4th	28	14	14	.500	Won quarterfinals (Donar, 2–0); Lost semifinals (Amsterdam Astronauts, 0–3)		Jos Wolffs
