= José Waitman =

American basketball player (1964–2013)

Personal information
- Born: April 28, 1964 Milton, Florida, U.S.
- Died: April 17, 2013 (aged 48)
- Listed height: 6 ft 8 in (2.03 m)

Career information
- College: South Alabama (1982–1986)
- Playing career: 1986–2000
- Position: Forward

Career history
- 1996-1997: Basket Brussels

Career highlights
- Eredivisie MVP (1987)

José Waitman (born April 28, 1964 – April 17, 2013) was an American professional basketball player. Standing at 6 ft 8 (2.03 m) and 220 lbs (100 kg), he was a forward. He played four seasons of collegiate basketball for South Alabama, from 1982 to 1986.

In the 1986–87 season, Waitman played professionally in the Dutch Eredivisie for Den Helder (then named Direktbank Noordkop). He won the Most Valuable Player award of the league.

From 1988 to 1989, Waitman played for Elitzur Netanya of the Israeli Basketball Premier League, where he averaged 18.8 points per game. In the same season, he also played in France with Toulouse of the LNB Pro A. The next season, Waitman played for Élan Béarnais Pau-Orthez of the second-tier LNB Pro B.

In 1998–99, Waitman played with Maccabi Ra'anana, averaging 10.9 points and 6.1 rebounds a game.

His son Corliss Waitman also attended South Alabama. Instead of playing basketball, Corliss ended up in the NFL as a punter. He currently plays for the San Francisco 49ers.
