= Mike Reddick =

American basketball player (born 1963)

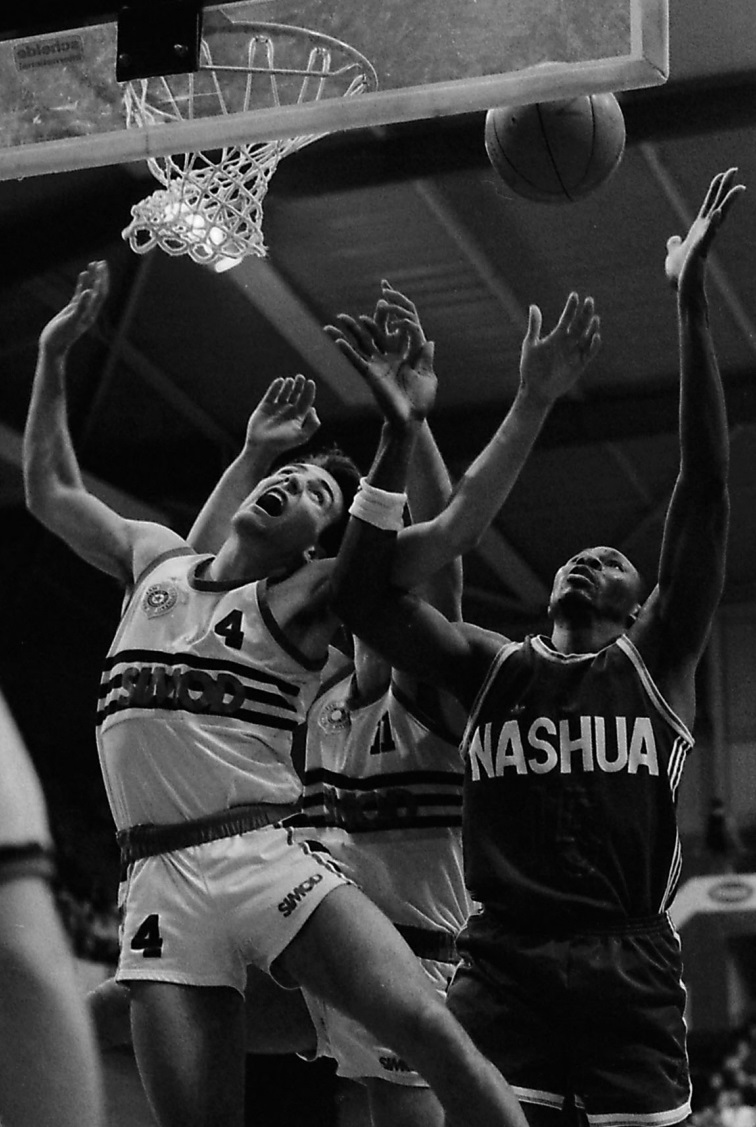
- Reddick (on the right) and Aleksandar Đorđević in 1988

Personal information
- Born: February 14, 1963 (age 63) Savannah, Georgia, U.S.
- Listed height: 6 ft 8 in (2.03 m)
- Listed weight: 210 lb (95 kg)

Career information
- High school: Sol C. Johnson (Savannah, Georgia)
- College: Stetson (1980–1984)
- NBA draft: 1984: 6th round, 136th overall pick
- Drafted by: Milwaukee Bucks
- Playing career: 1984–1995
- Position: Forward
- Number: 14

Career history
- 1984–1985: Saint Étienne
- 1985–1986: Verviers
- 1986–1989: EBBC Den Bosch
- 1989–1991: Reggiana
- 1992–1993: Varese
- 1993–1994: Reyer Venezia
- 1994–1995: Ülkerspor

Career highlights
- 2× Eredivisie champion (1987, 1988); Eredivisie MVP (1988); 3× First-team All-Eredivisie (1987–1989)
- Stats at Basketball Reference

Michael Irving Reddick (born February 14, 1963) is an American former basketball player. At 2.03 metres (6 ft 8 in) tall, he played as forward.

== High school and college career ==
Born in Savannah, Georgia, Reddick attended Sol C. Johnson High School. From 1980 to 1984, he played for Stetson University in Florida and averaged 11.2 points and 6.9 rebounds per game. In 1981, Reddick played with the United States student team in a tournament in Taiwan and later in Seoul. He was also named the most valuable player (MVP) of the 1981 Tangerine Bowl tournament, recording 20 points, 11 rebounds and three blocks in their championship game victory over Niagara. In the 1984 NBA draft, he was selected in the sixth round by the Milwaukee Bucks.

== Professional career ==
Reddick started his professional career in 1984 with French club Saint Étienne, where he averaged 18.9 points and 12.1 rebounds in his rookie year. The following season he played with Belgian club Verviers.

From 1986 to 1989, Reddick played three seasons for Nashua Den Bosch and averaged 20.2 points in 127 games. He won two Eredivisie championships and was named the MVP of the 1987–88 season. Reddick also played in the FIBA European Champion's Cup with Den Bosch.

He continued his career in Italy with Reggiana (1989 to 1991), Varese (1992–93) and Reyer Venezia (1993–94). In the 1994–95 season, Reddick played in Turkey with Ülkerspor of the Basketbol Süper Ligi.

After his retirement, Reddick started his coaching career. He was the head coach of South Atlanta High School in 1994, where he coached future NBA player Derrick Favors.
