= Kees Akerboom Sr. =

Dutch basketball player (born 1952)

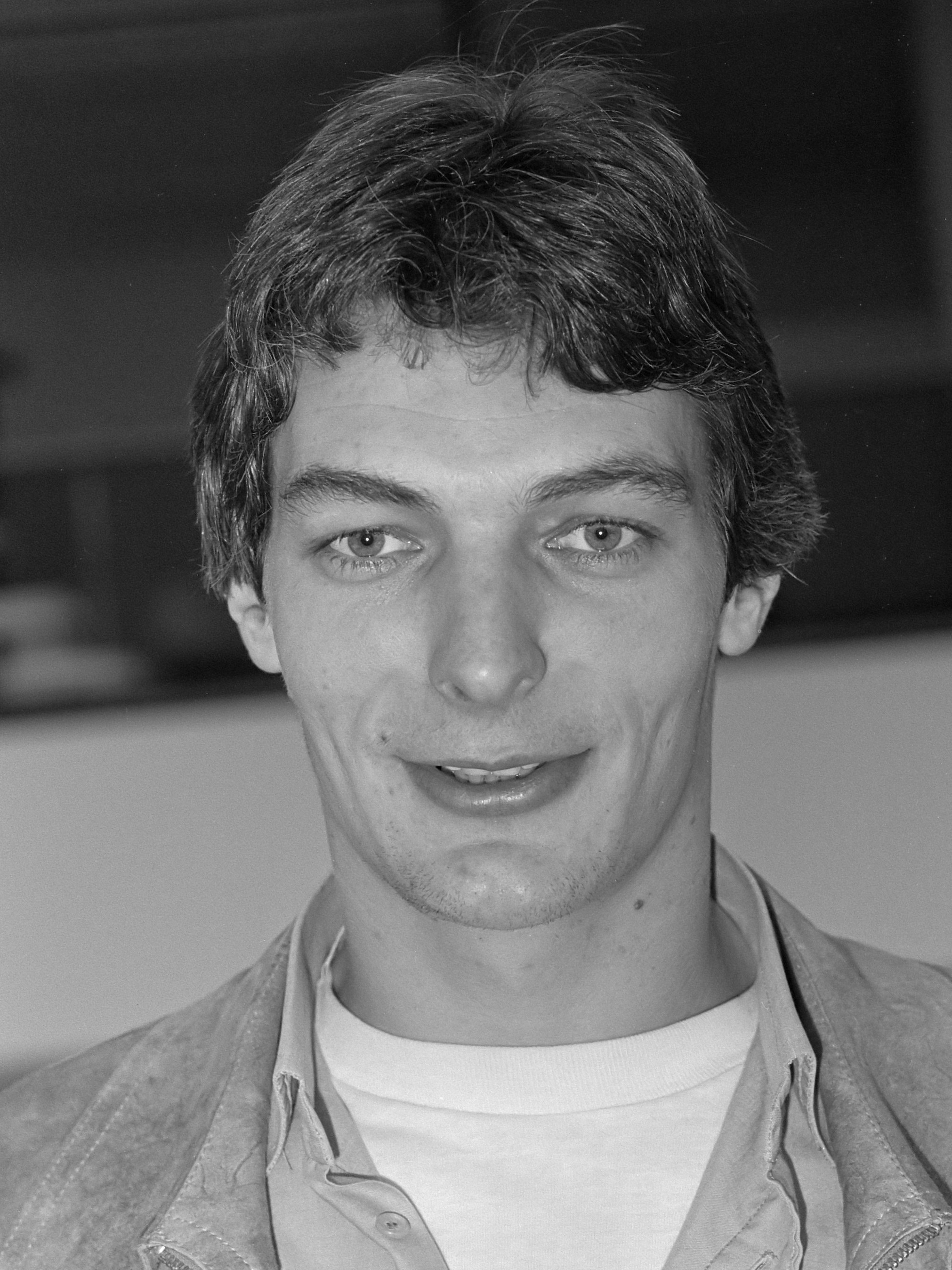
- Akerboom in 1980

Personal information
- Born: 18 April 1952 (age 74) Haarlem, Netherlands
- Listed height: 2.04 m (6 ft 8 in)

Career information
- Playing career: 1969–1986
- Position: Shooting guard / small forward
- Number: 12

Career history
- 1969–1975: Flamingo's Haarlem
- 1975–1985: EBBC Den Bosch
- 1985–1986: Virtus Werkendam

Career highlights
- No. 12 retired by Heroes Den Bosch; 3× Dutch League MVP (1980, 1981, 1985); 7× All-Dutch League Team (1974, 1975, 1978, 1980–1982, 1984, 1985); 5× Dutch League All-Star (1975, 1976, 1978, 1981, 1982); EuroBasket Top Scorer (1977)

Kees Akerboom Sr. (born 18 April 1952) is a Dutch former basketball player. Akerboom is the father of Kees Akerboom Jr., who also played as a professional basketball player in the Eredivisie. He was a 2.04 m tall shooting guard.

== Club career ==
Akerboom started playing basketball at age 16 and joined the Flamingo's Haarlem under Jan Janbroers after two years.

Akerboom played with EBBC Den Bosch, with whom he reached a FIBA Saporta Cup Final in 1979.

== Dutch national team ==
As a member of the senior Dutch national basketball team, Akerboom led the 1977 EuroBasket in scoring, averaging 27 points per game. His performance earned him a selection to the EuroBasket All-Tournament Team. Akerboom is 2nd on the all-time list of games played for the senior Dutch national team, with 182 appearances. Only Toon van Helfteren, has played more games, with 207.

== Awards and accomplishments ==
=== Club ===
Flamingo's Haarlem

- 3× Eredivisie: (1971, 1972, 1973)
- 2× NBB Cup: (1970, 1971)

Den Bosch

- 5× Eredivisie: (1979, 1980, 1981, 1984, 1985)

=== Individual ===
- 3× Dutch League MVP: (1980, 1981, 1985)
- 7× All-Dutch League Team: (1974, 1975, 1978, 1980, 1981, 1982, 1984, 1985)
- 5× Dutch League All-Star: (1975, 1976, 1978, 1981, 1982)
- FIBA EuroBasket Top Scorer: (1977)
- FIBA EuroBasket All-Tournament Team: (1977)
