= BC Virtus Werkendam =

Virtus
- Leagues: Promotiedivisie
- Founded: 1971; 54 years ago
- History: List: BC Virtus (1971–1983) Super Cracks Werkendam (1983–1986) BC Virtus (1986–1996) Image Center Virtus (1996–2001) BC Virtus (2001–present)
- Arena: Sporthal De Crosser
- Location: Werkendam, Netherlands
- Championships: 1 Dutch Cup
- Website: bcvirtus.nl
Home	Away

BC Virtus, also known as Virtus Werkendam, is an amateur basketball club based in Werkendam, Netherlands. Virtus played in the Eredivisie as a professional club from 1996 till 2001. In those years, the club won one trophy: the NBB Cup in the 2000–01 season. The team also reached the Eredivisie Finals in the 1999–2000 season. In the 1985–86 season Virtus made an appearance in Europe, losing in the first round of the Korać Cup to Saski Baskonia.

== Honours ==
- NBB Cup
  - Winners (1): 2000–01

== Season by season ==
Season	Tier	League	Pos.	W–L	NBB Cup	European competitions		
1983–84	1	Eredivisie	7th	9–23				
1984–85	1	Eredivisie	5th	14–14				
1985–86	1	Eredivisie	8th	11–25		3 Korać Cup	R1	0–2
1986–96	Lower divisions							
1996–97	1	Eredivisie	10th	7–25				
1997–98	1	Eredivisie	8th	16–19				
1998–99	1	Eredivisie	9th	13–19				
1999–00	1	Eredivisie	2nd	24–19				
2000–01	1	Eredivisie	5th	20–15	Winners			
2001–	Lower divisions							

== European record ==
Season	Competition	Round	Club	Home	Away	Agg
1985–86	FIBA Korać Cup	First round	(Spain) Basconia	73–88	94–130	167–218

Notes

1. Virtus points are listed first.
