= Goba Gorinchem =

GOBA Gorinchem
- Leagues: Tweede Klasse
- Founded: 1 May 1970; 55 years ago
- Location: Gorinchem, Netherlands
- Championships: 1 NBB Cup; 1 Promotiedivisie
- Website: goba.nu
Home

Goba Gorinchem is a Dutch basketball club based in Gorinchem. Established on 1 May 1970, the team played three seasons in the Eredivisie, the highest tier of Dutch basketball. GOBA entered the Eredivisie in 1993 and left in 1996. In the 1994–95 season, the team won the national NBB Cup.

In the 1995–96 season, Goba played two European games against Finnish club Namika Lahti.

== Honours ==
NBB Cup

- Winners (1): 1994–95

Haarlem Basketball Week

- Runner-up (1): 1994

Promotiedivisie

- Winners (1): 2008–09

== European record ==
Season	Competition	Round	Club	Home	Away	Agg
1995–96	FIBA European Cup	R1	(Finland) Namika Lahti	73–78	75–78	151–153

Notes

1. GOBA points are listed first.

== Notable players ==
Note: Flags indicate national team eligibility at FIBA-sanctioned events. Players may hold other non-FIBA nationalities not displayed.

Criteria

To appear in this section a player must have either:

- Set a club record or won an individual award while at the club
- Played at least one official international match for their national team at any time
- Played at least one official NBA match at any time.

- (Netherlands) Richard van Poelgeest (2 seasons: '94-'96)
- (United States) Michael Huger (1 season: '94-'95)
- (United States) Tico Cooper
- (United States) Jeff Malham
- (Netherlands) Okke te Velde
