= BC Eindhoven =

- Founded: 6 January 1961
- History: EBC Pirates; 1961–? PSV Basketball ?–1981; BC Eindhoven; 1981–present
- Arena: Achtse Barrier
- Location: Eindhoven, Netherlands
- Championships: 1 Dutch Cup
- Website: www.bc-eindhoven.nl
Away

BC Eindhoven is a Dutch basketball club based in Eindhoven, that currently plays in the lower regional leagues. In the 1980s and 1990s, it played in the first level Dutch Basketball League (DBL).

Its predecessor was EBC Pirates, which was founded in 1961. Later, the club was known as PSV Basketball as the team became a part of football club PSV Eindhoven. Due to investments by PSV, the team promoted to the lower national divisions. In 1980, PSV Basketball won the national NBB Cup. To play in the national level, the team was separated in 1982 and the BC Eindhoven entity was founded. In the 1987–88 season, Eindhoven promoted from the Promotiedivisie to the first-tier Eredivisie. The team stayed here until the 1990s, after the necessary financial support for professional basketball was missing.

The current BC Eindhoven club only consists of amateur teams.

== Honours ==
NBB Cup

- Winners (1): 1979–80

Promotiedivisie

- Winners (1): 1987–88
