= EiffelTowers Nijmegen =

- Leagues: Eredivisie
- Founded: 2000
- Dissolved: 2005
- Arena: De Horstacker
- Location: Nijmegen, Netherlands
- Main sponsor: Eiffel BV
- Championships: 1 Eredivisie; 1 NBB Cup
Home	Away

EiffelTowers Nijmegen was a Dutch basketball club based in Nijmegen. The club played in the top-tier Eredivisie during the period 2000–2005 and won one championship in 2003. In 2005, the club merged with EBBC Den Bosch to form EiffelTowers Den Bosch.

== History ==
In 2000 the first-division club was founded as the EiffelTowers Nijmegen and played its games in De Horstacker in Nijmegen. Marco van den Berg was hired as the team's head coach. With main sponsor Eiffel BV, the club was able to sign high quality American players which led to quick successes. In 2003, the EiffelTowers dominated in the Eredivie and team won the Dutch national championship, as well as the NBB Cup. In the playoff finals, Omniworld was swept easily, 4–0. In 2005 main sponsor Eiffel decided to move its club to Den Bosch to merge with Tulip Den Bosch. Main reason was the small arena in Nijmegen, which didn't allow the club to play in European competitions.

The following season, a new team from Nijmegen was founded in Matrixx Magixx.

== Honours ==
- Dutch Basketball League (1):

2002–03

- Dutch Cups (1):

2003
Runner-up: 2002

== Season by season ==
Season	Tier	League	Pos.	NBB Cup	European competitions		
2000–01	1	Eredivisie	4th				
2001–02	1	Eredivisie	2nd		3 Korać Cup	R1	0–2
2002–03	1	Eredivisie	1st	Winners	4 Champions Cup	L23	10–6
2003–04	1	Eredivisie	3rd		2 ULEB Cup	RS	3–7
2004–05	1	Eredivisie	3rd		2 ULEB Cup	RS	1–9

== Head coaches ==
- Marco van den Berg: (2000–2004)
- Randy Wiel: (2004–2005)
