= Flamingo's Haarlem =

- Founded: 1954
- Dissolved: 1983
- History: Black Pirates (1954–1957); Flamingo's (1957–1982); Stars Haarlem (1982–1983)
- Arena: Krelagehuis
- Location: Haarlem, Netherlands
- Main sponsor: Levi's (1970–1975); Buitoni (1975–1978)
- Championships: 4 (1968, 1971, 1972, 1973)
Home	Away

Flamingo's Haarlem was a professional basketball team based in Haarlem, Netherlands. Flamingo's played in the Eredivisie from 1960 till 1983, excluding the 1961–62 season. The team won the Dutch championship and NBB Cup four times. The Flamingo's also played at the highest European stage many times: in the 1966–67, 1968–69, 1970–71, 1971–72, and 1973–74 season the team did at least play in the qualifying round.

The team was founded in 1954 as Black Pirates by baseball players who before played for several different teams. In its first year, they were the city champions of Haarlem and finished third in the national league. The games were played in the Krelagehuis, despite there being no changing rooms and showers. The rent of the hall was so expensive, that the club did not make profit despite high attendance for games. Players of Flamingo's had to pay entrance for the games as well to cover the rent.

== Names ==
Due to sponsorship reasons the club knew many names:

- 1954–1957: Black Pirates
- 1957–1970 : Flamingo's Haarlem
- 1970–1975 : Levi's Flamingo's Haarlem
- 1975–1978 : Buitoni Haarlem
- 1978–1979 : Flamingo's Haarlem
- 1979–1982 : Eve & Adam Flamingo's
- 1982–1983 : Stars Haarlem

== Honours ==
- Eredivisie (4):

1968, 1971, 1972, 1973

- NBB Cup (4):

1969, 1970, 1971, 1976

== Notable players ==
- (United States) (Israel) Barry Leibowitz
- (Netherlands) Hank Smith
