= Basketball Cup (Netherlands) =

- Founded: 1967; 59 years ago
- First season: 1967–68
- Country: Netherlands
- Confederation: FIBA Europe
- Number of teams: 52
- Related competitions: Dutch Basketball League; Dutch Supercup
- Current champions: Donar (8th title) (2025–26)
- Most championships: Heroes Den Bosch (9 titles)
- Website: Official website
- 2026–27 Dutch Basketball Cup

The Basketball Cup, for sponsorship reasons the TOTO Basketball Cup and formerly the NBB Cup (Dutch: NBB-Beker), is an annual cup competition for Dutch basketball teams organised by the Basketball Nederland. Every team in the Netherlands can participate by signing up for the preliminary rounds. Professional basketball teams from the Dutch Basketball League (DBL) enter the tournament in the fourth round. From 1977 until 1990 professional teams were not allowed to participate in the competition.

The tournament is organized in a knock-out format, with quarter- and semi-finals being two-legged series while the final is played in a single game. Heroes Den Bosch holds the record for most cup titles with nine titles. During the 2020–21 season, the tournament was not played and was replaced by the DBL Cup, featuring only the twelve DBL teams.

== Format ==
In the first, second and third round teams from the Dutch second, third and fourth division participate. From the fourth round, teams from the Dutch Basketball League (DBL) enter the competition. Quarter- and semi-finals are played in a two-legged format. When a team form a tier lower than the DBL played a DBL team, one win is sufficient for the latter to advance to the next round.

== Finals ==
From 1986 to 1993, the final was played over two legs with both finalists playing one game at home and one game away. From 2005 to 2013, the venue was fixed as the Topsportcentrum in Almere hosted the final every year.

Season	Winner	Score	Runners-up	Venue	City
1967–68	SVE Utrecht (1)	81–79	Landlust Amsterdam		Amsterdam
1968–69	Flamingo's Haarlem (1)	52–37	The Lions	Beatrixhal	Utrecht
1969–70	Flamingo's Haarlem (2)	86–84	Punch		Utrecht
1970–71	Flamingo's Haarlem (3)	103–82	Blue Stars		Haarlem
1971–72	The Lions (1)	86–84	Punch		Haarlem
1972–73	Blue Stars (1)	92–82	RZ		Voorschoten
1973–74	Punch (1)	85–70	Flamingo's Haarlem		Amsterdam
1974–75 (Note: In the 1974–75 season, Arke Stars Enschede won the Cup, but RZ was marked as cup winner so the team could play in the 1975–76 FIBA European Champions Cup.)	Arke Stars Enschede (1)	–	RZ		Enschede
1975–76	Flamingo's Haarlem (4)	73–67	Punch		Leiden
1976–77	BOB Oud-Beijerland (1)	94–89	Hertogballers Den Bosch		The Hague
1977–78	VAK Stars Leiden (1)	86–84	Hertogballers Den Bosch		Utrecht
1978–79	Celeritas (1)	86–84	ASVU Amstelveen		Almere
1979–80	PSV Almonte				
1980–81	Rowic (Note: DBV Rowic was known as "Snel Reizen" for sponsorship reasons.) (1)				
1981–82	DAS Delft (1)				
1982–83	Green Eagles Maassluis (1)				
1983–84	Kinheim Haarlem (1)				
1984–85	AMVJ Rotterdam (1)				
1985–86	BVO Alphen aan de Rijn (1)				
1986–87	Lokomotief (1)	91–91, 86–82	WGW Den Helder		Den Helder, Rijswijk
1987–88	FAC Den Helder (1)	68–65, 71–66	BV Aalsmeer		Den Helder, Aalsmeer
1988–89	Waddinxveen Flyers (1)	88–91, 83–71	BV Hoofddorp		Waddinxveen, Hoofddorp
1989–90	Akrides (1)	116–90, 102–76	Rotterdam		Rotterdam, IJmuiden
1990–91	Akrides (2)	83–74, 90–77	DAS Delft		Haarlem, Delft
1991–92	Den Helder (1)	97–81, 63–77	Den Bosch	Quelderduijn; Maaspoort	Den Helder, 's-Hertogenbosch
1992–93	Den Bosch (1)	80–83, 101–82	BS Weert	Sporthal Boshoven; Maaspoort (2)	Weert, 's-Hertogenbosch
1993–94 (Note: In 1993–94 two Cup competition were played, one open for all clubs and one only for Eredivisie clubs. Red Giants Meppel won the former and Den Helder won the latter)	Den Helder (2)	84-75	BS Weert	Quelderduijn (3)	Den Helder
1993–94	Red Giants (1)		CBV Binnenland		
1994–95	Goba Gorinchem (1)	79-72	Den Helder	Maaspoort (3)	's-Hertogenbosch
1996–97	Amsterdam (1)	20–0 (Note: The 1997 final was not played after Donar refused to play after it already sent home their American players. Amsterdam automatically won the game 20–0.)	Donar	–	–
1997–98	Amsterdam Astronauts (2)	68–66	Den Helder	Apollohal	Amsterdam
1998–99	Amsterdam Astronauts (3)	85–79	Den Helder	Apollohal (2)	Amsterdam
1999–00	Den Bosch (2)	89–79	Donar	Martiniplaza	Groningen
2000–01	Virtus Werkendam	88–87	BS Weert	Sporthal Boshoven	Weert
2001–02	Den Bosch (3)	88–78	EiffelTowers Nijmegen	De Horstacker	Nijmegen
2002–03	EiffelTowers Nijmegen (1)	90–88	Amsterdam Astronauts	Sporthallen Zuid	Amsterdam
2003–04	Amsterdam Astronauts (4)	65–62	Den Bosch	Sporthallen Zuid (2)	Amsterdam
2004–05	Donar (Note: Played as "MPC Capitals".) (1)	83–78	Landstede	Martiniplaza (2)	Groningen
2005–06	Amsterdam Astronauts (5)	61–60	Rotterdam	Topsportcentrum	Rotterdam
2006–07	Magixx (1)	70–60	Donar (Note: Played as "Hanzevast Capitals".)	Topsportcentrum (2)	Almere
2007–08	Den Bosch (4)	93–82	Amsterdam	Topsportcentrum (3)	Almere
2008–09	Den Bosch (5)	70–64	Amsterdam	Topsportcentrum (4)	Almere
2009–10	Leiden (1)	88–63	Amsterdam	Topsportcentrum (5)	Almere
2010–11	Donar (Note: Played as "GasTerra Flames".) (2)	67–55	West-Brabant Giants	Topsportcentrum (6)	Almere
2011–12	Leiden (2)	88–74	Magixx	Topsportcentrum (7)	Almere
2012–13	Den Bosch (6)	73–61	Landstede	Topsportcentrum (8)	Almere
2013–14	Donar (3)	79–71	Leiden	Landstede Sportcentrum	Zwolle
2014–15	Donar (4)	78–70	Den Bosch	Landstede Sportcentrum (2)	Zwolle
2015–16	Den Bosch (7)	58–57	Leiden	Landstede Sportcentrum (3)	Zwolle
2016–17	Donar (5)	78–58	Landstede	MartiniPlaza (3)	Groningen
2017–18	Donar (6)	87–71	Leiden	MartiniPlaza (4)	Groningen
2018–19	Leiden (3)	87–69	Landstede	Landstede Sportcentrum (4)	Zwolle
2019–20	The final was cancelled due to the COVID-19 pandemic (Note: Donar and Aris Leeuwarden had qualified for the final of the 2019–20 season before it was cancelled. The final was supposed to be played on 10 January 2021, however Aris refused to play that day.)				
2021 (Note: In 2021, the DBL Cup was organised by the Dutch Basketball League as a one-week tournament. Only DBL teams participated.)	BAL (1)	98–88	Yoast United	Landstede Sportcentrum (5)	Zwolle
2021–22	Donar (7)	76–71	Heroes Den Bosch	MartiniPlaza (5)	Groningen
2022–23	Leiden (4)	72–70	Landstede Hammers	Landstede Sportcentrum (6)	Zwolle
2023–24	Heroes Den Bosch (8)	89–82	Landstede Hammers	Topsportcentrum (9)	Almere
2024–25	Heroes Den Bosch (9)	90–85 (OT)	Donar	Sportcampus The Hague	The Hague
2025–26	Donar (8)	78–77	Landstede Hammers	Topsportcentrum (10)	Almere

== Performances by clubs ==
Teams in italic are inactive or dissolved, teams in bold currently play in the BNXT League (the highest level league of basketball in the Netherlands). Four teams active at the highest level have won the Dutch Cup, namely Heroes Den Bosch, Donar, ZZ Leiden and BAL.

Basketball Cup finals performance by club
Club	Winners	Runners-up	Years won	Years runner-up
**Heroes Den Bosch**	9	4	1993, 2000, 2002, 2008, 2009, 2013, 2016, 2024, 2025	1992, 2004, 2015, 2022
**Donar**	8	4	2005, 2011, 2014, 2015, 2017, 2018, 2022, 2026	1997, 2000, 2007, 2025
ABC Amsterdam	5	4	1997, 1998, 1999, 2004, 2006	2003, 2008, 2009, 2010
**ZZ Leiden**	4	3	2010, 2012, 2019, 2023	2014, 2016, 2018
Flamingo's Haarlem	4	1	1969, 1970, 1971, 1976	1974
Magixx	2	2	2003, 2007	2002, 2012
Akrides	2	0	1990, 1991	–
Punch	1	4	1974	1970, 1972, 1976, 1991
Den Helder	1	3	1992	1995, 1998, 1999
The Lions	1	1	1972	1969
**BAL**	1	0	2021	–
Virtus	1	0	2001	–
Goba Gorinchem	1	0	1995	–
Celeritas	1	0	1979	–
VAK Stars Leiden	1	0	1978	–
BOB Oud-Beijerland	1	0	1977	–
Arke Stars Enschede	1	0	1975	–
SVE Utrecht	1	0	1968	–
Lokomotief	1	0	1987	–
DAS Delft	1	0	1982	–
Rowic	1	0	1981	–
Red Giants	1	0	1994	–
**Landstede Hammers**	0	7	–	2005, 2013, 2017, 2019, 2023, 2024, 2026
BSW Weert	0	3	–	1993, 1994, 2001
**Feyenoord / Rotterdam**	0	2	–	1990, 2006
RZ	0	2	–	1973, 1975
ASVU Amstelveen	0	1	–	1979
West-Brabant Giants	0	1	–	2011
FIAT Stars Amsterdam	0	1	–	1971
Landlust / Canadians	0	1	–	1968
**Yoast United**	0	1	–	2021

== Statistics ==
=== Finals top scorers ===
Season	Finals top scorer	Club	Points scored	Ref.
1971	Kees Akerboom Sr.	Flamingo's Haarlem	24	
1971	Frank Kales	Flamingo's Haarlem	24	
1973	Tom Chestnut	Fiat Stars	30	
1974	Pieter van Tuyll van Serooskerken	Punch Delft	29	
1976	Gary Freeman	Flamingo's Haarlem	27	
2000	Lamont Randolph	Donar*	21	
2003	Ryan Robertson	EiffelTowers Nijmegen*	27	
2004	Darnell Clavon	Tulip Den Bosch*	21	
2007	Darnell Hinson	Donar*	26	
2008	Tamien Trent	Amsterdam*	23	
2010	Ronny LeMelle	ZZ Leiden	22	
2011	Tim Blue	West-Brabant Giants*	18	
2012	Seamus Boxley	ZZ Leiden	25	
2012	Markel Humphrey	Magixx*	25	
2014	DeJuan Wright	ZZ Leiden*	28	
2015	Chris Denson	Den Bosch*	22	
2016	Worthy de Jong	ZZ Leiden*	23	
2017	Arvin Slagter	Donar	16	
2017	Lance Jeter	Donar	16	
2018	Brandyn Curry	Donar	26	
2019	Darius Thompson	ZZ Leiden	25	
2021	Andrés Ibargüen	Yoast United*	39	
2022	Austin Price	Heroes Den Bosch*	21	
2023	Maarten Bouwknecht	ZZ Leiden	19	
2024	Sherron Dorsey-Walker	Heroes Den Bosch	18	
2025	Travian Dunn-Martin	Donar*	25	
2026	Damian Forrest	Donar	30	

Teams with a * next to their name lost the finals.
