= BSW (basketball) =

- Leagues: Dutch Basketball League
- Founded: 1968
- Dissolved: 2017
- Arena: Sporthal Boshoven
- Capacity: 1,000
- Location: Weert, Netherlands
- Ownership: Stichting Basketball Stars Weert
- Championships: 1 Dutch League
Home	Away

Basketball Stars Weert, commonly known as BSW, was a professional basketball team based in Weert, Netherlands. The club was founded in 1968 and played in the Dutch Basketball League. Home games of the team are played in the Sporthal Boshoven.

The club was a regular participant in the Dutch top division, as the side from Weert appeared in the Eredivisie (later DBL) for 34 straight seasons. The highlight of the club was the national championship in the 1993–94 season. The club finished three times as runner-up in the DBL: in 1988, 1993 and 2001. As well, BSW made European appearances with the most notable being the one in the FIBA European Cup Winners' Cup, the highest European level, in 1994–95.

In 2017 the club was dissolved after financial problems and the inability to gain enough money to participate. However, the club was replaced by BAL from Weert.

== Names ==
BSW has known a lot of different names in its history, mainly because of sponsorship reasons.

- 1982–1984 : Coveco
- 1984–1987 : Kaypro
- 1987–1990 : Miniware
- 1990–1993 : Selex
- 1993–1996 : Lanèche
- 1996–2000 : BS Weert
- 2000–2002 : Vanilla
- 2002–2003 : BS Weert
- 2003–2004 : Solskin
- 2004–2005 : BS Weert
- 2005–2010 : Upstairs Weert
- 2010–2011 : BS Weert
- 2011–2013 : Stepco
- 2013–2014 : Maxxcom
- 2014–2017: BS Weert

== Players ==
=== Notable players ===
Note: Flags indicate national team eligibility at FIBA-sanctioned events. Players may hold other non-FIBA nationalities not displayed.

Criteria

To appear in this section a player must have either:

- Set a club record or won an individual award while at the club
- Played at least one official international match for their national team at any time
- Played at least one official NBA match at any time.

- (United States) Kevin McDuffie
- (Netherlands) Richard van Poelgeest
- (United States) Sonique Nixon
- (United States) Ralph Biggs
- (United States) Terence Stansbury
- (United States) Rahmon Fletcher
- (United States) Glenn Stokes
- (Netherlands) Niels Vorenhout
- (Netherlands) Jeremy Ormskerk
- (Netherlands) Kenneth van Kempen
- (Netherlands) Dolf Duijvelshoff

== List of head coaches ==
Period	Coach	Nationality
2004–2010	Olivier van Kempen	(Netherlands)
2010–2011	Terence Stansbury	(United States)
2011–2013	Jim Meil	(United States)
2013–2015	Niels Vorenhout	(Netherlands)
2015–2016	Radenko Varagic	(Serbia)

== Honours ==
- Dutch Basketball League
  - Winners (1): 1993–94
- NBB Cup
  - Runners-up (3): 1992–93, 1993–94, 2000–01

== European record ==
Season	Competition	Round	Club	Home	Away	Agg
1988–89	FIBA European Cup Winners' Cup	First round	(Luxembourg) T71 Dudelange	94–40	94–64	188–104
1988–89	FIBA European Cup Winners' Cup	Second round	(France) Cholet	56–75	42–80	98–155
1991–92	FIBA Korać Cup	First round	(Spain) Valladolid	83–103	80–104	163–207
1994–95	FIBA European League	First round	(England) Thames Valley Tigers	62–78	94–96	156–174

Notes

1. BSW points are listed first.

== Season by season ==
Season	Tier	League	Pos.	NBB Cup	European competitions		
1982–83	1	Eredivisie	7th				
1983–84	1	Eredivisie	5th				
1984–85	1	Eredivisie	6th				
1985–86	1	Eredivisie	5th				
1986–87	1	Eredivisie	6th				
1987–88	1	Eredivisie	2nd				
1988–89	1	Eredivisie	3rd		1 Cup Winners' Cup	R2	3–1
1989–90	1	Eredivisie	4th				
1990–91	1	Eredivisie	5th				
1991–92	1	Eredivisie	4th		3 Korać Cup	R1	0–2
1992–93	1	Eredivisie	2nd	Runner–up			
1993–94	1	Eredivisie	1st	Runner–up			
1994–95	1	Eredivisie	5th		1 European League	R1	0–2
1995–96	1	Eredivisie	7th				
1996–97	1	Eredivisie	4th				
1997–98	1	Eredivisie	5th				
1998–99	1	Eredivisie	3rd				
1999–00	1	Eredivisie	5th				
2000–01	1	Eredivisie	2nd	Runner–up			
2001–02	1	Eredivisie	8th				
2002–03	1	Eredivisie	5th				
2003–04	1	Eredivisie	8th				
2004–05	1	Eredivisie	10th				
2005–06	1	Eredivisie	8th				
2006–07	1	Eredivisie	4th				
2007–08	1	Eredivisie	8th				
2008–09	1	Eredivisie	7th				
2009–10	1	Eredivisie	8th	Quarterfinalist			
2010–11	1	DBL	7th	Quarterfinalist			
2011–12	1	DBL	7th	Semifinalist			
2012–13	1	DBL	8th	Fourth round			
2013–14	1	DBL	10th	Fourth round			
2014–15	1	DBL	8th	Quarterfinalist			
2015–16	1	DBL	8th				
2016–17	1	DBL	8th				
