= List of Dutch basketball champions =

The Dutch basketball champions, are the winners of the highest level of basketball in the Netherlands, which is the BNXT League since 2022. This page is a list of winners and runners-up in each given DBL season, along with additional information.

Heroes Den Bosch has won a total number of 16 titles, the highest of any club. Currently, only four teams that have won championships are still active in the DBL: Heroes Den Bosch, Landstede Hammers, Leiden and Donar.

From 1945 to 2021, the Dutch basketball champion came from the Dutch Basketball League (formerly the Eredivisie). Since 2022, the champion is decided through the BNXT League; this league features Belgian teams as well but organises a playoffs to determine the Dutch champions.

Two teams have won a treble so far, Donar in 2016 and ZZ Leiden in 2023.

== Season summaries (1945–1977) ==
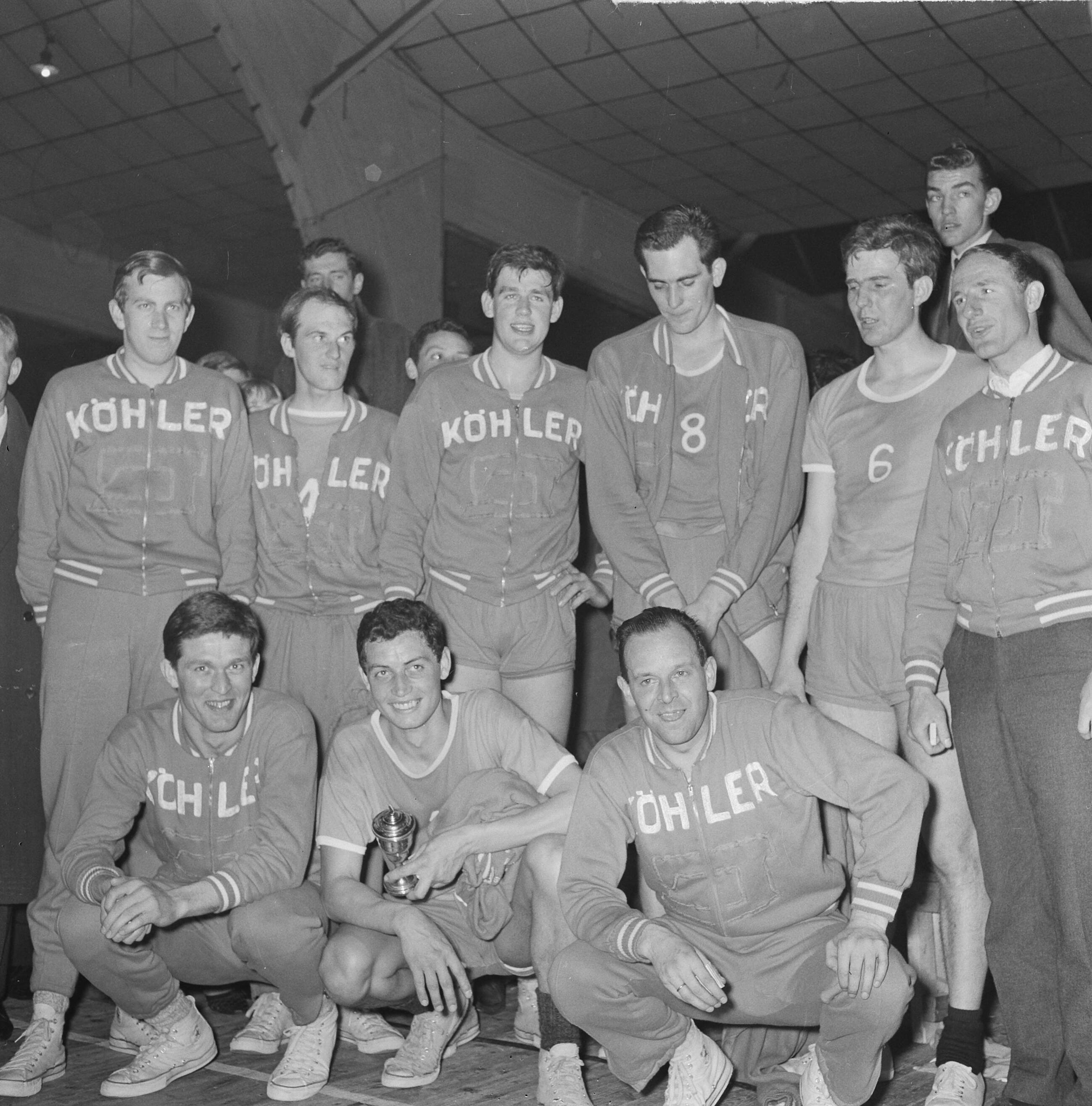
The Wolves Amsterdam after winning the 1965 title

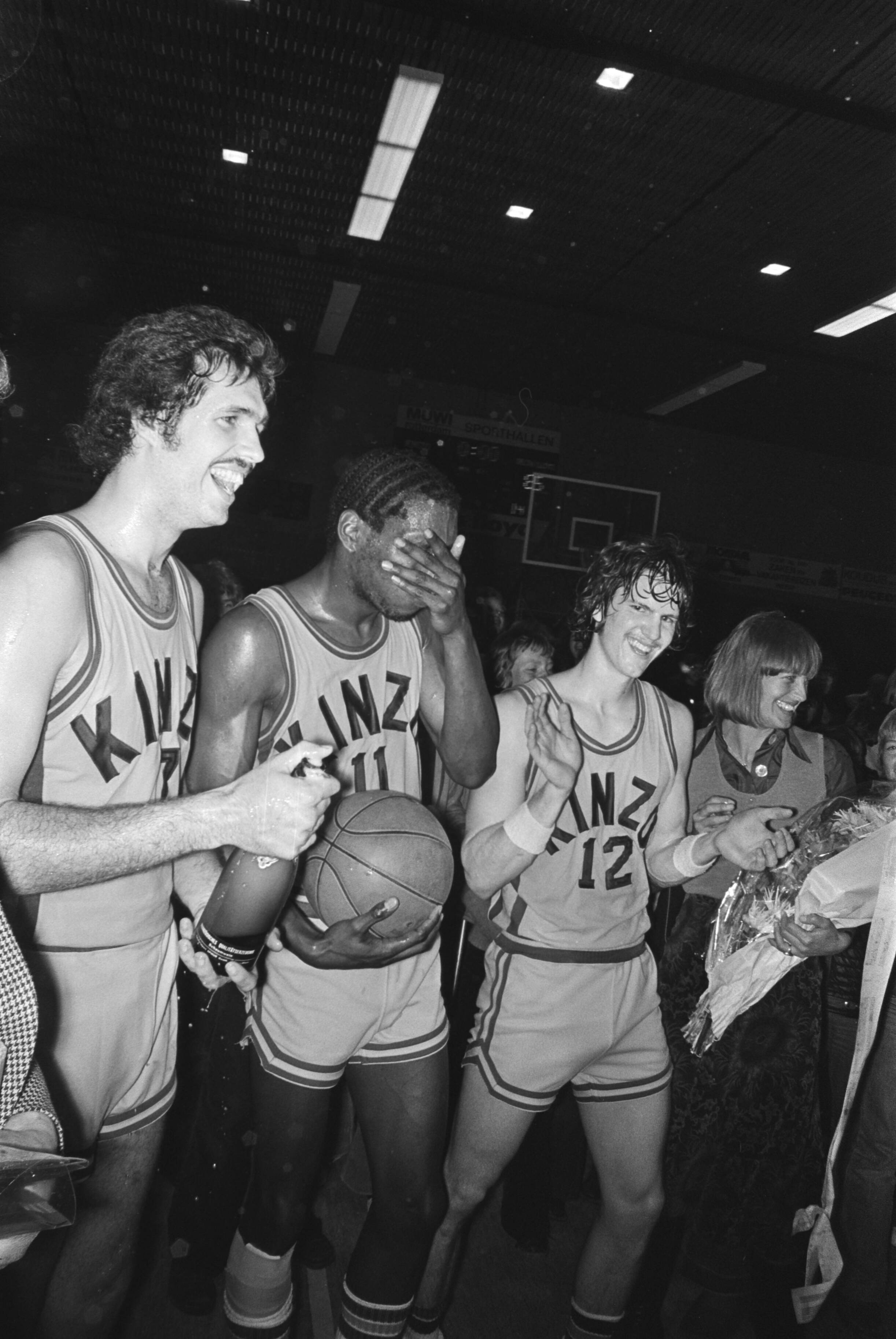
Kinzo Amstelveen players celebrating the 1976 title

In the early years of the Eredivisie, a round-robin competition was played to determine the national champion. The team with the most wins was crowned champion.

Season	Champion	Runner–up
1945–46	DED	
1946–47	DED (2)	APGS
1947–48	APGS	
1948–49	AMVJ	
1949–50	DED (3)	
1950–51	AMVJ (2)	The Arrows Rotterdam
1951–52	DED (4)	Antilopen Haarlem
1952–53	DED (5)	The Arrows Rotterdam
1953–54	DED (6)	The Arrows Rotterdam
1954–55	AMVJ (3)	SSD Delft
1955–56	DED (7)	SSD Delft
1956–57	The Wolves Amsterdam	Zeemacht Den Helder
1957–58 (Note: In the 1957–58 season, DED and Blue Stars played in a best-of-three playoff series to determine the national champion.)	DED (8)	Blue Stars
1958–59	Blue Stars	
1959–60	The Wolves Amsterdam (2)	
1960–61	The Wolves Amsterdam (3)	Blue Stars
1961–62	Landlust	
1962–63	Landlust (2)	
1963–64	The Wolves Amsterdam (4)	
1964–65	The Wolves Amsterdam (5)	
1965–66	Herly Amsterdam	
1966–67	Eendracht Utrecht	Landlust
1967–68	Flamingo's Haarlem	Landlust
1968–69	Punch	Blue Stars
1969–70	Blue Stars (3)	RZ
1970–71	Flamingo's Haarlem (2)	RZ
1971–72	Flamingo's Haarlem (3)	Fiat Stars
1972–73	Flamingo's Haarlem (4)	Raak Punch
1973–74	RZ	Flamingo's Haarlem (5)
1974–75	Punch	RZ
1975–76	Amstelveen	Flamingo's Haarlem
1976–77	Amstelveen (2)	Den Bosch

== DBL / BNXT Finals (1978–present) ==
In the 1977–78 Eredivisie season, the play-offs were introduced, along with finals which determined the winner of a given DBL season.

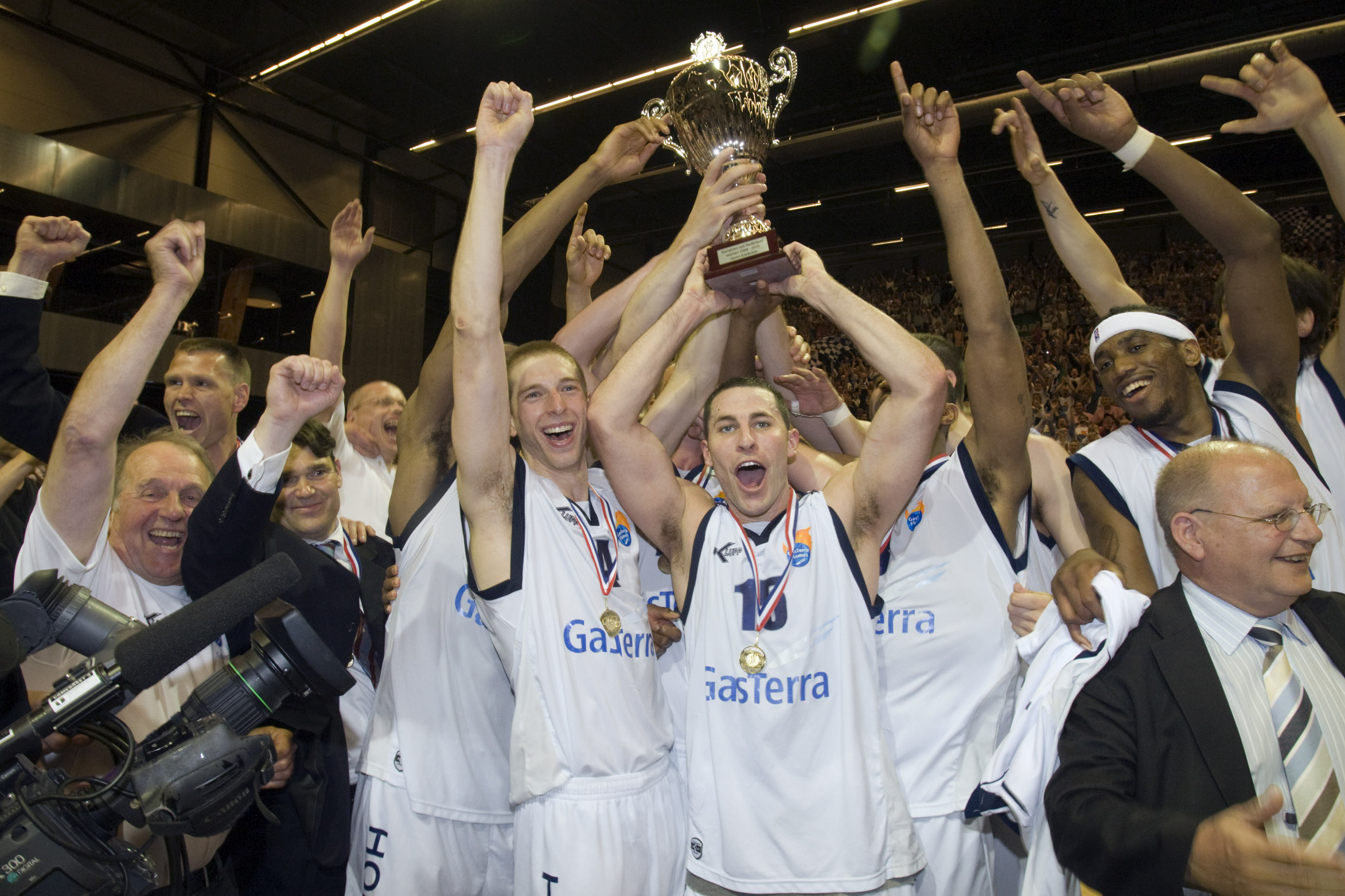
Players of GasTerra Flames (currently known as Donar) holding the trophy after winning the 2009–10 championship

†	Double winner (champion also won NBB Cup)
‡	Treble winner (champion also won Dutch Cup and Supercup)
*	Treble winner (champion also won the Dutch Cup and BNXT League)

Season	Champion	Score	Runner–up	Champions' coach	Playoffs MVP / Finals MVP
1977–78	Leiden (Note: Known as "Parker Leiden".) (1)	2–1	Punch (Note: Known as "Tripper Jeans Delft".)	Ton Boot	—N/a
1978–79	Den Bosch (1)	2–0	Leiden	Ton Boot	—N/a
1979–80	Den Bosch (2)	2–0	Leiden	Ton Boot	—N/a
1980–81	Den Bosch (Note: Known as "Nashua Den Bosch".) (3)	2–0	Leiden	Bill Sheridan	—N/a
1981–82	Donar (Note: Known as "Nationale Nederlanden Donar".) (1)	3–1	Den Bosch	Maarten van Gent	—N/a
1982–83	Den Bosch (4)	3–0	Hatrans Haaksbergen	Ton Boot	—N/a
1983–84	Den Bosch (5)	3–1	Leiden (Note: Known as "Elmex Leiden".)	Ton Boot	—N/a
1984–85	Den Bosch (6)	3–0	Leiden	Jan Dekker	—N/a
1985–86	Den Bosch (7)	3–2	Den Helder	Jan Dekker	—N/a
1986–87	Den Bosch (8)	3–1	Den Helder	Jan Janbroers	—N/a
1987–88	Den Bosch (9)	3–1	BSW	Jan Dekker	—N/a
1988–89	Den Helder (1)	3–1	Den Bosch	Ton Boot	—N/a
1989–90	Den Helder (2)	3–2	Den Bosch	Ton Boot	—N/a
1990–91	Den Helder (3)	3–0	Den Bosch	Ton Boot	—N/a
1991–92	Den Helder† (4)	3–2	Den Bosch	Ton Boot	—N/a
1992–93	Den Bosch† (10)	4–2	BSW	Cor van Esch	—N/a
1993–94	BSW (1)	4–2	Den Bosch	Olivier van Kempen	—N/a
1994–95	Den Helder (5)	4–1	GOBA Gorinchem	Meindert van Veen	—N/a
1995–96	Den Bosch (11)	4–2	Den Helder	Jos Wolfs	—N/a
1996–97	Den Bosch (12)	4–3	Amsterdam	Jos Wolfs	—N/a
1997–98	Den Helder (6)	4–3	Donar	Bob Gonnen	—N/a
1998–99	Amsterdam Astronauts (1)	4–3	Den Helder	Ton Boot	—N/a
1999–00	Amsterdam Astronauts (2)	4–1	Virtus Werkendam	Ton Boot	—N/a
2000–01	Amsterdam Astronauts (3)	4–2	BSW	Ton Boot	—N/a
2001–02	Amsterdam Astronauts (4)	4–3	EiffelTowers Nijmegen	Ton Boot	—N/a
2002–03	EiffelTowers Nijmegen† (1)	4–1	Omniworld Almere	Marco van den Berg	—N/a
2003–04	Donar (Note: Known as "MPC Capitals".) (2)	4–2	Den Bosch	Ton Boot	—N/a
2004–05	Amsterdam Astronauts (5)	4–0	Landstede	Arik Shivek	Joe Spinks
2005–06	Den Bosch (13)	4–3	Donar	Randy Wiel	—N/a
2006–07	Den Bosch (14)	4–0	Magixx	Randy Wiel	—N/a
2007–08	Amsterdam (6)	4–3	Den Bosch	Arik Shivek	—N/a
2008–09	Amsterdam (7)	4–3	Den Bosch	Arik Shivek	—N/a
2009–10	Donar (Note: Known as "GasTerra Flames".) (3)	4–1	West-Brabant Giants	Marco van den Berg	—N/a
2010–11	Leiden (2)	4–3	Donar	Toon van Helfteren	—N/a
2011–12	Den Bosch (15)	4–1	Leiden	Raoul Korner	—N/a
2012–13	Leiden (3)	4–0	Aris Leeuwarden	Toon van Helfteren	—N/a
2013–14	Donar (4)	4–3	Den Bosch	Ivica Skelin	Arvin Slagter
2014–15	Den Bosch (16)	4–1	Donar	Sam Jones	Brandyn Curry
2015–16	Donar (5)	4–1	Landstede	Erik Braal	Lance Jeter
2016–17	Donar‡ (6)	4–1	Landstede	Erik Braal	Chase Fieler
2017–18	Donar† (7)	4–0	Leiden	Erik Braal	Brandyn Curry
2018–19	Landstede (1)	4–2	Donar	Herman van den Belt	Kaza Kajami-Keane
2019–20	Not held due to the coronavirus pandemic				
2020–21	Leiden (4)	3–0	Heroes Den Bosch	Geert Hammink	Worthy de Jong
BNXT League era
2021–22	Heroes Den Bosch (17)	3–2	Leiden	Erik Braal	Thomas van der Mars
2022–23	Leiden (5)*	3–2	Donar	Doug Spradley	Thomas Rutherford
2023–24	Leiden (6)	3–1	Heroes Den Bosch	Doug Spradley	Brock Gardner
2024–25	Heroes Den Bosch† (18)	3–0	Leiden	Erik Braal	Le'Tre Darthard
2025–26	Landstede Hammers (2)	3–1	Leiden	Gaëlle Bouzin	Jalen Thomas

== Playoffs finals performances by clubs ==
Titles won by club (%)
1. Den Bosch – 18 (38.0%)
2. Donar – 7 (14.0%)
3. Amsterdam – 7 (14.0%)
4. Den Helder – 6 (13.0%)
5. Leiden – 6 (13.0%)
6. Others – 4 (8.00%)

The following table lists all clubs that have won or finished as runners-up in the Dutch League since the introducing of playoff finals.

Teams in italic are inactive or dissolved. Teams in bold indicates clubs that are currently active in the top division.

Club	Winners	Runners-up	Apps	Pct	Years won	Years runner-up
**Heroes Den Bosch**	18	12	30	.600	1979, 1980, 1981, 1983, 1984, 1985, 1986, 1987, 1988, 1993, 1996, 1997, 2006, 2007, 2012, 2015, 2022, 2025	1982, 1989, 1990, 1991, 1992, 1994, 2004, 2008, 2009, 2014, 2021, 2024
**Donar**	7	6	13	.538	1982, 2004, 2010, 2014, 2016, 2017, 2018	1998, 2006, 2011, 2015, 2019, 2023
Amsterdam	7	1	8	.875	1999, 2000, 2001, 2002, 2005, 2008, 2009	1997
Den Helder	6	4	10	.600	1989, 1990, 1991, 1992, 1995, 1998	1986, 1987, 1996, 1999
**Leiden**	6	10	15	.375	1978, 2011, 2013, 2021, 2023, 2024	1979, 1980, 1981, 1984, 1985, 2012, 2018, 2022, 2025, 2026
**Landstede Hammers**	2	3	4	.400	2019, 2026	2005, 2016, 2017
BSW	1	3	4	.250	1994	1988, 1993, 2001
EiffelTowers Nijmegen	1	1	2	.500	2003	2002
**Aris Leeuwarden**	–	1	1	.000	–	2013
West-Brabant Giants	–	1	1	.000	–	2010
Magixx	–	1	1	.000	–	2007
GOBA Gorinchem	–	1	1	.000	–	1995
Punch	–	1	1	.000	–	1978
Virtus Werkendam	–	1	1	.000	–	2000
Almere Pioneers (Note: One finals appearance as "BC Omniworld".)	–	1	1	.000	–	2003
Tonego (Note: One finals appearance as "Hatrans Haaksbergen".)	–	1	1	.000	–	1983

== Titles by club ==
The following table lists all clubs that have won the national championship. Seventeen clubs have been crowned Dutch national basketball champions.

Rank	Club	Wins	Runner-up	Seasons won
1	Heroes Den Bosch	18	12	1978–79, 1979–80, 1980–81, 1982–83, 1983–84, 1984–85, 1985–86, 1986–87, 1987–88, 1992–93, 1995–96, 1996–97, 2005–06, 2006–07, 2011–12, 2014–15, 2021–22, 2025
2	DED	8	0	1945–46, 1946–47, 1949–50, 1951–52, 1952–53, 1953–54, 1955–56, 1957–58
3	Astronauts Amsterdam	7	1	1998–99, 1999–00, 2000–01, 2001–02, 2004–05, 2007–08, 2008–09
3	Donar	7	5	1981–82, 2003–04, 2009–10, 2013–14, 2015–16, 2016–17, 2017–18
5	Den Helder	6	4	1988–89, 1989–90, 1990–91, 1991–92, 1994–95, 1997–98
5	ZZ Leiden	6	10	1977–78, 2010–11, 2012–13, 2020–21, 2022–23, 2023–24
7	The Wolves Amsterdam	4	0	1959–60, 1960–61, 1963–64, 1964–65
7	Flamingo's Haarlem	4	2	1985–86, 1970–71, 1971–72, 1972–73
9	AMVJ	3	0	1948–49, 1950–51, 1954–55
10	Blue Stars	2	3	1958–59, 1969–70
10	Landlust	2	2	1961–62, 1962–63
10	Punch Delft	2	2	1968–69, 1974–75
10	Landstede Hammers	2	2	2018–19, 2025–26
10	Amstelveen	2	0	1975–76, 1976–77
15	APGS	1	1	1947–48
15	Herly Amsterdam	1	0	1965–66
15	SVE Utrecht	1	0	1966–67
15	RZ	1	3	1973–74
15	BSW Weert	1	1	1993–94
15	EiffelTowers Nijmegen	1	1	2002–03

== Titles by province ==
Region	Championships	Clubs
North Holland	39	DED (8), ABC Amsterdam (7), Den Helder (6), Flamingo's Haarlem (4), The Wolves Amsterdam (4), AMVJ (3), Landlust (2), Blue Stars (2), APGS (1), Amstelveen (1), Herly (1)
North Brabant	18	Heroes Den Bosch (18)
South Holland	9	Leiden (6), Punch (2), RZ (1)
Groningen	7	Donar (7)
Overijssel	2	Landstede Hammers (2)
Limburg (Netherlands)	1	BSW Weert (1)
Gelderland	1	EiffelTowers (1)
Utrecht	1	SVE Utrecht (1)
Flevoland	–	–
Drenthe	–	–
Friesland	–	–
Zeeland	–	–

== Titles by city ==
City	Championships	Clubs
Amsterdam	26	DED (8), ABC Amsterdam (7), The Wolves Amsterdam (4), AMVJ (3), Landlust (2), APGS (1), Amstelveen (1), Herly (1)
's-Hertogenbosch	18	Heroes Den Bosch (18)
Groningen	7	Donar (7)
Den Helder	6	Den Helder (6)
Leiden	6	Leiden (6)
Haarlem	4	Flamingo's Haarlem (4)
Diemen	2	Blue Stars (2)
Delft	2	Punch (2)
Zwolle	2	Landstede Hammers (2)
Weert	1	BSW Weert (1)
Nijmegen	1	EiffelTowers (1)
Utrecht	1	SVE Utrecht
Rotterdam	1	RZ (1)
