= Maccabi Tel Aviv B.C. in international competitions =

Maccabi Tel Aviv history and statistics, in the FIBA Europe and Euroleague Basketball Company competitions.

== European competitions ==
Record	Round	Opponent club			
1958 FIBA European Champions Cup 1st–tier
0–2	3rd round	(Romania) Steaua București	65–84 a	61–63 h	
1958–59 FIBA European Champions Cup 1st–tier
0–2	2nd round	(Bulgaria) Academic	50–69 a	58–78 h	
1959–60 FIBA European Champions Cup 1st–tier
	1st round	(Turkey) Fenerbahçe	Maccabi withdrew without games		
1962–63 FIBA European Champions Cup 1st–tier
1–1	1st round	(Socialist Federal Republic of Yugoslavia) AŠK Olimpija	46–60 h	72–71 a	
1963–64 FIBA European Champions Cup 1st–tier
1–1	2nd round	(Czechoslovakia) Spartak ZJŠ Brno	60–58 h	51–96 a	
1964–65 FIBA European Champions Cup 1st–tier
1–1	1st round	(Greece) AEK	74–67 h	53–64 a	
1966–67 FIBA European Cup Winner's Cup 2nd–tier
5–4	2nd round	(Greece) Aris	101–71 h	71–91 a	
5–4	QF	(Spain) Juventud Kalso	69–101 a	83–51 h	75–51 h
5–4	SF	(Bulgaria) Botev	91–60 h	67–68 a	
5–4	F	(Italy) Ignis Varese	67–77, April 7, Palazzetto dello Sport Lino Oldrini, Varese; 68–67, April 13, Yad Eliyahu Arena, Tel Aviv		
1967–68 FIBA European Champions Cup 1st–tier
6–4	1st round	(France) Alsace Bagnolet	85–62 h	80–82 a	
6–4	2nd round	(West Germany) Gießen 46ers	84–72 a	105–62 h	
6–4	QF	(Belgium) Racing Bell Mechelen	78–62 h	02–00 a	
6–4	QF	(Spain) Real Madrid	54–64 a	96–88 h	
6–4	QF	(Czechoslovakia) Spartak ZJŠ Brno	76–105 a	77–88 h	
1968–69 FIBA European Champions Cup 1st–tier
3–5	2nd round	(Turkey) İTÜ	79–83 a	72–59 h	
3–5	QF	(Belgium) Standard Liège	67–80 a	82–77 h	
3–5	QF	(Czechoslovakia) Spartak ZJŠ Brno	88–78 h	61–75 a	
3–5	QF	(Italy) Oransoda Cantù	51–67 h	54–70 a	
1969–70 FIBA European Cup Winner's Cup 2nd–tier
1–1	2nd round	(Italy) Fides Napoli	89–82 h	62–91 a	
1970–71 FIBA European Champions Cup 1st–tier
1–1	2nd round	(Belgium) Standard Liège	86–107 a	74–62 h	
1971–72 FIBA European Champions Cup 1st–tier
1–1	2nd round	(Greece) Panathinaikos	73–81 a	81–80 h	
1972–73 FIBA European Champions Cup 1st–tier
5–5	1st round	(Sweden) Alvik	103–74 a	87–70 h	
5–5	2nd round	(Belgium) Bus Fruit Lier	97–74 h	65–72 a	
5–5	QF	(Socialist Federal Republic of Yugoslavia) Crvena zvezda	113–102 h	88–103 a	
5–5	QF	(Italy) Simmenthal Milano	74–108 a	113–88 h	
5–5	QF	(Spain) Real Madrid	87–88 h	75–87 a	
1973–74 FIBA European Champions Cup 1st–tier
4–4	2nd round	(Netherlands) Levi's Flamingo's	84–85 a	90–71 h	
4–4	QF	(Italy) Ignis Varese	77–83 h	76–93 a	
4–4	QF	(France) Berck	86–115 a	79–58 h	
4–4	QF	(Belgium) Racing Ford Antwerpen	91–85 a	84–74 h	
1974–75 FIBA European Champions Cup 1st–tier
6–4	2nd round	(Greece) Panathinaikos	90–76 a	113–80 h	
6–4	QF	(Netherlands) Transol RZ	94–85 a	90–91 h	
6–4	QF	(Spain) Real Madrid	95–114 h	94–114 a	
6–4	QF	(Sweden) Alvik	104–72 a	125–106 h	
6–4	QF	(Soviet Union) CSKA Moscow	CSKA withdrew without games		
6–4	QF	(France) Berck	88–78 h	58–74 a	
1975–76 FIBA European Champions Cup 1st–tier
4–6	2nd round	Bye	Maccabi qualified without games		
4–6	QF	(Netherlands) Transol RZ	86–87 a	118–86 h	
4–6	QF	(Spain) Real Madrid	78–125 a	90–91 h	
4–6	QF	(Austria) Sefra Wien	102–72 h	63–75 a	
4–6	QF	(Switzerland) Federale	92–93 a	96–94 h	
4–6	QF	(Italy) Forst Cantù	88–76 h	81–106 a	
1976–77 FIBA European Champions Cup 1st–tier
12–5	1st round	(Greece) Olympiacos	90–74 a	101–75 h	
12–5	1st round	(Romania) Dinamo București	89–83 a	92–81 h	
12–5	1st round	(Italy) Sinudyne Bologna	110–81 h	60–76 a	
12–5	SF	(Czechoslovakia) Spartak-Zbrojovka Brno	02–01 h	91–76 a	
12–5	SF	(Soviet Union) CSKA Moscow	02–01 h	91–79 a	
12–5	SF	(Italy) Mobilgirgi Varese	79–102 h	70–81 a	
12–5	SF	(Belgium) Racing Maes Pils Mechelen	66–75 a	109–93 h	
12–5	SF	(Spain) Real Madrid	94–85 h	94–106 a	
12–5	F	(Italy) Mobilgirgi Varese	78–77; April 7, Hala Pionir, Belgrade		
1977–78 FIBA European Champions Cup 1st–tier
6–4	1st round	Bye	Maccabi qualified without games		
6–4	SF	(Socialist Federal Republic of Yugoslavia) Jugoplastika	111–112 a	94–74 h	
6–4	SF	(Italy) Mobilgirgi Varese	78–91 a	91–80 h	
6–4	SF	(Spain) Real Madrid	101–92 h	77–98 a	
6–4	SF	(France) ASVEL	90–80 h	87–100 a	
6–4	SF	(Sweden) Alvik	93–83 a	96–88 h	
1978–79 FIBA European Champions Cup 1st–tier
9–5	1st round	(Turkey) Eczacıbaşı	87–76 h	72–62 a	
9–5	1st round	(Belgium) Fresh Air	80–83 a	108–73 h	
9–5	SF	(Greece) Olympiacos	77–79 a	95–51 h	
9–5	SF	(Socialist Federal Republic of Yugoslavia) Bosna	97–70 h	87–101 a	
9–5	SF	(Italy) Emerson Varese	72–71 h	53–71 a	
9–5	SF	(Spain) Real Madrid	76–90 a	100–77 h	
9–5	SF	(Spain) Joventut Freixenet	83–77 a	99–92 h	
1979–80 FIBA European Champions Cup 1st–tier
12–5	1st round	(Turkey) Efes Pilsen	100–53 h	96–56 a	
12–5	1st round	(Romania) Dinamo București	97–69 h	81–69 a	
12–5	1st round	(Greece) Aris	103–104 a	111–78 h	
12–5	SF	(Netherlands) Nashua EBBC	87–86 h	63–54 a	
12–5	SF	(Socialist Federal Republic of Yugoslavia) Bosna	79–84 a	84–69 h	
12–5	SF	(Italy) Sinudyne Bologna	100–73 h	77–89 a	
12–5	SF	(Spain) Real Madrid	96–97 a	110–100 h	
12–5	SF	(Socialist Federal Republic of Yugoslavia) Partizan	87–71 h	95–91 a	
12–5	F	(Spain) Real Madrid	85–89; March 27, Deutschlandhalle, West Berlin		
1980–81 FIBA European Champions Cup 1st–tier
11–6	1st round	(Greece) Panathinaikos	76–81 a	81–73 h	
11–6	1st round	(England) Sutton & Crystal Palace	122–70 h	83–74 a	
11–6	1st round	(France) Tours	82–87 a	87–85 h	
11–6	SF	(Spain) Real Madrid	100–92 h	89–96 a	
11–6	SF	(Italy) Sinudyne Bologna	73–74 a	92–88 h	
11–6	SF	(Netherlands) Nashua EBBC	99–90 h	80–97 a	
11–6	SF	(Socialist Federal Republic of Yugoslavia) Bosna	97–86 a	107–100 h	
11–6	SF	(Soviet Union) CSKA Moscow	85–74 h	81–83 a	
11–6	F	(Italy) Sinudyne Bologna	80–79; March 26, Hall Rhénus, Strasbourg		
1981–82 FIBA European Champions Cup 1st–tier
15–2	1st round	(Finland) Torpan Pojat	117–79 a	121–95 h	
15–2	1st round	(Romania) Steaua București	102–83 h	97–81 a	
15–2	1st round	(West Germany) Saturn Köln	98–90 a	97–84 h	
15–2	SF	(Greece) Panathinaikos	112–91 h	86–78 a	
15–2	SF	(Netherlands) Nashua EBBC	100–87 h	101–93 a	
15–2	SF	(Socialist Federal Republic of Yugoslavia) Partizan	84–83 a	88–86 h	
15–2	SF	(Spain) FC Barcelona	99–97 a	115–106 h	
15–2	SF	(Italy) Squibb Cantù	87–86 h	81–100 a	
15–2	F	(Italy) Squibb Cantù	80–86; March 25, Sporthalle, Cologne		
1982–83 FIBA European Champions Cup 1st–tier
8–6	1st round	(Austria) UBSC Wien	85–63 a	94–77 h	
8–6	2nd round	(Netherlands) Nationale-Nederlanden Donar	69–76 a	88–68 h	
8–6	SF	(Socialist Federal Republic of Yugoslavia) Cibona	108–81 h	94–87 a	
8–6	SF	(Spain) Real Madrid	99–93 h	92–95 a	
8–6	SF	(Soviet Union) CSKA Moscow	69–78 a	84–80 h	
8–6	SF	(Italy) Ford Cantù	89–95 a	94–84 h	
8–6	SF	(Italy) Billy Milano	69–77 h	68–69 a	
1983–84 FIBA European Champions Cup 1st–tier
6–8	1st round	(Denmark) Århus	145–85 a	133–62 h	
6–8	2nd round	(Greece) Aris	68–62 a	75–76 h	
6–8	SF	(Italy) Jollycolombani Cantù	65–74 a	79–77 h	
6–8	SF	(France) Limoges	95–104 h	111–105 a	
6–8	SF	(Socialist Federal Republic of Yugoslavia) Bosna	112–80 h	85–90 a	
6–8	SF	(Italy) Banco di Roma Virtus	67–82 a	85–91 h	
6–8	SF	(Spain) FC Barcelona	75–94 a	98–105 h	
1984–85 FIBA European Champions Cup 1st–tier
11–5	preliminary round	(Cyprus) Achilleas Kaimakli	143–43 a	143–56 h	
11–5	1st round	(Romania) Steaua București	114–103 a	131–88 h	
11–5	2nd round	(Belgium) Sunair Oostende	80–90 a	132–75 h	
11–5	SF	(Italy) Banco di Roma Virtus	95–86 h	94–90 a	
11–5	SF	(Spain) Real Madrid	101–97 h	76–100 a	
11–5	SF	(Socialist Federal Republic of Yugoslavia) Cibona	77–88 a	88–87 h	
11–5	SF	(Soviet Union) CSKA Moscow	67–79 a	87–81 h	
11–5	SF	(Italy) Granarolo Bologna	90–76 h	86–94 a	
1985–86 FIBA European Champions Cup 1st–tier
8–6	1st round	(England) Kingston Kings	112–93 a	120–92 h	
8–6	2nd round	(Netherlands) Nashua EBBC	113–95 a	103–86 h	
8–6	SF	(Socialist Federal Republic of Yugoslavia) Cibona	86–90 a	105–102 h	
8–6	SF	(Spain) Real Madrid	93–102 h	86–111 a	
8–6	SF	(France) Limoges	85–88 a	115–96 h	
8–6	SF	(Soviet Union) Žalgiris	77–94 h	88–86 a	
8–6	SF	(Italy) Simac Milano	102–95 h	70–82 a	
1986–87 FIBA European Champions Cup 1st–tier
11–4	1st round	(Switzerland) Pully	102–91 a	124–112 h	
11–4	2nd round	(Finland) Torpan Pojat	95–89 a	112–86 h	
11–4	SF	(Socialist Federal Republic of Yugoslavia) Zadar	99–83 h	81–78 a	
11–4	SF	(Italy) Tracer Milano	79–97 h	94–79 a	
11–4	SF	(France) Orthez	77–78 a	106–87 h	
11–4	SF	(Soviet Union) Žalgiris	74–82 a	81–74 h	
11–4	SF	(Spain) Real Madrid	81–80 h	89–82 a	
11–4	F	(Italy) Tracer Milano	69–71; April 2, Centre Intercommunal de Glace de Malley, Lausanne		
1987–88 FIBA European Champions Cup 1st–tier
11–7	Top 16	(Portugal) Benfica	111–86 h	81–79 a	
11–7	QF	(Spain) FC Barcelona	108–107 h	80–106 a	
11–7	QF	(Netherlands) Nashua EBBC	102–103 a	113–80 h	
11–7	QF	(Greece) Aris	95–91 h	77–93 a	
11–7	QF	(Italy) Tracer Milano	93–99 h	81–113 a	
11–7	QF	(West Germany) Saturn Köln	108–102 a	111–97 h	
11–7	QF	(France) Orthez	92–78 h	91–82 a	
11–7	QF	(Socialist Federal Republic of Yugoslavia) Partizan	77–85 a	98–84 h	
11–7	SF	(Socialist Federal Republic of Yugoslavia) Partizan	87–82; April 5, Flanders Expo, Ghent		
11–7	F	(Italy) Tracer Milano	84–90; April 7, Flanders Expo, Ghent		
1988–89 FIBA European Champions Cup 1st–tier
15–3	Top 16	(Belgium) Sunair Oostende	104–91 a	93–91 h	
15–3	QF	(Spain) FC Barcelona	82–83 h	70–94 a	
15–3	QF	(France) Limoges	87–67 a	97–92 h	
15–3	QF	(Greece) Aris	97–77 h	102–90 a	
15–3	QF	(Italy) Scavolini Pesaro	92–88 h	93–92 a	
15–3	QF	(Soviet Union) CSKA Moscow	97–92 a	94–90 h	
15–3	QF	(Netherlands) Nashua EBBC	124–93 h	91–88 a	
15–3	QF	(Socialist Federal Republic of Yugoslavia) Jugoplastika	86–85 a	102–90 h	
15–3	SF	(Greece) Aris	99–86; April 4, Olympiahalle, Munich		
15–3	F	(Socialist Federal Republic of Yugoslavia) Jugoplastika	69–75; April 6, Olympiahalle, Munich		
1989–90 FIBA European Champions Cup 1st–tier
8–8	Top 16	(Austria) Klosterneuburg	103–84 a	86–62 h	
8–8	QF	(France) Limoges	78–88 h	75–100 a	
8–8	QF	(Poland) Lech Poznań	86–73 a	93–81 h	
8–8	QF	(Netherlands) Commodore Den Helder	96–83 h	83–81 a	
8–8	QF	(Spain) FC Barcelona	74–84 h	85–107 a	
8–8	QF	(Socialist Federal Republic of Yugoslavia) Jugoplastika	61–79 a	87–93 h	
8–8	QF	(Italy) Philips Milano	88–76 h	104–106 a	
8–8	QF	(Greece) Aris	81–98 a	94–92 h	
1990–91 FIBA European Champions Cup 1st–tier
11–9	1st round	(Switzerland) Ideal Job Pully	92–95 a	107–74 h	
11–9	Top 16	(Sweden) Scania Södertälje	88–91 a	92–77 h	
11–9	QF	(France) Limoges	100–92 h	114–95 a	
11–9	QF	(Italy) Scavolini Pesaro	86–98 a	87–93 h	
11–9	QF	(England) Kingston Kings	80–62 h	62–64 a	
11–9	QF	(Spain) FC Barcelona	64–89 a	78–68 h	
11–9	QF	(Greece) Aris	81–93 a	101–89 h	
11–9	QF	(Socialist Federal Republic of Yugoslavia) Pop 84	72–70 a	103–65 h	
11–9	QF	(Germany) Bayer 04 Leverkusen	101–102 a	95–83 h	
11–9	SF	(Spain) FC Barcelona	67–101; April 16, Palais Omnisports de Paris-Bercy, Paris		
11–9	3rd place game	(Italy) Scavolini Pesaro	83–81; April 18, Palais Omnisports de Paris-Bercy, Paris		
1991–92 FIBA European League 1st–tier
11–6	2nd round	Bye	Maccabi qualified without games		
11–6	Top 16	(Italy) Phonola Caserta	102–95 h	83–84 a	
11–6	Top 16	(Croatia) Slobodna Dalmacija	87–85 a	95–85 h	
11–6	Top 16	(France) Olympique Antibes	108–103 h	95–86 a	
11–6	Top 16	(Estonia) Kalev	129–118 h	107–83 a	
11–6	Top 16	(Croatia) Cibona	101–97 a	69–60 h	
11–6	Top 16	(Spain) FC Barcelona	83–94 h	88–85 a	
11–6	Top 16	(Italy) Knorr Bologna	83–96 a	81–83 h	
11–6	QF	(Spain) Estudiantes Caja Postal	98–97 h	74–98 a	54–55 a
1992–93 FIBA European League 1st–tier
5–9	2nd round	(Portugal) Benfica	102–95 h	83–84 a	
5–9	Top 16	(Spain) Joventut Marbella	87–82 h	80–82 a	
5–9	Top 16	(Federal Republic of Yugoslavia) Partizan	Partizan withdrew without games		
5–9	Top 16	(Croatia) Cibona	89–110 h	88–90 a	
5–9	Top 16	(Greece) PAOK	85–81 h	63–78 a	
5–9	Top 16	(Italy) Scavolini Pesaro	70–90 a	88–91 h	
5–9	Top 16	(Italy) Knorr Bologna	80–82 h	71–90 a	
5–9	Top 16	(France) Limoges	63–75 a	70–69 h	
1993–94 FIBA Korać Cup 3rd–tier
7–3	2nd round	Bye	Maccabi qualified without games		
7–3	3rd round	(Germany) Ulm	86–72 a	120–73 h	
7–3	Top 16	(Spain) Estudiantes Caja Postal	74–71 h	72–82 a	
7–3	Top 16	(Italy) Pfizer Reggio Calabria	81–55 h	75–71 a	
7–3	Top 16	(Greece) Nikas Peristeri	70–60 a	103–83 h	
7–3	QF	(Greece) Chipita Panionios	72–92 a	74–77 h	
1994–95 FIBA European League 1st–tier
10–6	2nd round	(Switzerland) Fidefinanz Bellinzona	55–49 a	89–62 h	
10–6	Top 16	(Greece) PAOK Bravo	75–84 h	62–79 a	
10–6	Top 16	(Greece) Panathinaikos	62–63 a	92–91 h	
10–6	Top 16	(Spain) Real Madrid	93–85 h	64–76 a	
10–6	Top 16	(Italy) Scavolini Pesaro	74–79 a	80–75 h	
10–6	Top 16	(Slovenia) Smelt Olimpija	79–61 h	86–79 a	
10–6	Top 16	(Russia) CSKA Moscow	92–89 h	78–87 a	
10–6	Top 16	(Portugal) Benfica	90–81 a	86–75 h	
1995–96 FIBA European League 1st–tier
8–8	2nd round	(Romania) Forest Sibiu	99–74 a	122–65 h	
8–8	Top 16	(France) Pau-Orthez	91–88 h	66–90 a	
8–8	Top 16	(Spain) Real Madrid	74–91 a	75–77 h	
8–8	Top 16	(Portugal) Benfica	74–66 h	94–82 a	
8–8	Top 16	(Spain) FC Barcelona	94–85 h	80–84 a	
8–8	Top 16	(Italy) Buckler Bologna	77–95 a	83–86 h	
8–8	Top 16	(Croatia) Cibona	78–75 h	78–71 a	
8–8	Top 16	(Greece) Panathinaikos	62–67 a	79–86 h	
1996–97 FIBA EuroLeague 1st–tier
10–9	1st round	(France) Limoges	69–62 a	69–77 h	
10–9	1st round	(Russia) CSKA Moscow	77–78 h	80–89 a	
10–9	1st round	(Italy) Stefanel Milano	78–68 h	88–85 a	
10–9	1st round	(Greece) Panionios Afisorama	74–69 a	69–57 h	
10–9	1st round	(Turkey) Ülker	80–84 a	71–65 h	
10–9	2nd round	(Germany) Alba Berlin	65–70 a	78–62 h	
10–9	2nd round	(Belgium) Spirou	87–70 h	82–90 a	
10–9	2nd round	(Greece) Olympiacos	60–69 a	82–78 h	
10–9	Top 16	(Turkey) Efes Pilsen	67–76 a	78–65 h	69–84 a
1997–98 FIBA EuroLeague 1st–tier
12–7	1st round	(France) Limoges	78–62 h	77–78 a	
12–7	1st round	(Spain) Real Madrid	87–82 h	76–68 a	
12–7	1st round	(Russia) CSKA Moscow	63–71 a	87–69 h	
12–7	1st round	(Turkey) Efes Pilsen	69–81 a	61–70 h	
12–7	1st round	(Greece) Olympiacos	73–87 h	76–71 a	
12–7	2nd round	(Turkey) Türk Telekom PTT	79–67 a	87–76 h	
12–7	2nd round	(Portugal) Porto	88–69 h	82–59 a	
12–7	2nd round	(Croatia) Split	75–73 a	78–69 h	
12–7	Top 16	(Italy) Teamsystem Bologna	93–96 a	88–72 h	65–68 a
1998–99 FIBA EuroLeague 1st–tier
7–11	1st round	(Greece) Panathinaikos	62–84 h	58–67 a	
7–11	1st round	(Turkey) Efes Pilsen	66–68 h	74–81 a	
7–11	1st round	(Spain) TDK Manresa	65–72 a	81–55 h	
7–11	1st round	(Federal Republic of Yugoslavia) Crvena zvezda	70–67 a	78–59 h	
7–11	1st round	(Croatia) Cibona	76–57 h	60–78 a	
7–11	2nd round	(Spain) TAU Cerámica	76–79 a	104–64 h	
7–11	2nd round	(Russia) Avtodor Saratov	92–69 h	73–83 a	
7–11	2nd round	(Italy) Varese Roosters	96–100 a	94–78 h	
7–11	Top 16	(Italy) Kinder Bologna	57–78 a	55–70 h	– a
1999–00 FIBA EuroLeague 1st–tier
17–7	1st round	(Greece) Olympiacos	63–65 a	54–65 h	
17–7	1st round	(Slovenia) Pivovarna Laško	84–62 h	92–87 a	
17–7	1st round	(Italy) Varese Roosters	87–79 a	87–66 h	
17–7	1st round	(Turkey) Ülker	89–74 h	79–85 a	
17–7	1st round	(France) ASVEL	73–61 h	65–70 a	
17–7	2nd round	(Federal Republic of Yugoslavia) Budućnost	67–59 a	74–60 h	
17–7	2nd round	(France) Pau-Orthez	65–55 h	62–57 a	
17–7	2nd round	(Spain) Caja San Fernando	75–51 a	66–54 h	
17–7	Top 16	(Greece) PAOK	77–62 h	55–67 a	78–62 h
17–7	QF	(Italy) Paf Wennington Bologna	62–65 h	80–73 a	79–64 h
17–7	SF	(Spain) FC Barcelona	65–51; April 18, PAOK Sports Arena, Thessaloniki		
17–7	F	(Greece) Panathinaikos	67–73; April 20, PAOK Sports Arena, Thessaloniki		
2000–01 FIBA SuproLeague 1st–tier
21–3	1st round	(Italy) Scavolini Pesaro	85–81 a	80–78 h	
21–3	1st round	(Sweden) Plannja	95–69 h	113–68 a	
21–3	1st round	(Belgium) Telindus Oostende	94–80 a	96–79 h	
21–3	1st round	(Turkey) Efes Pilsen	69–59 h	66–72 a	
21–3	1st round	(Germany) Bayer 04 Leverkusen	100–98 a	100–67 h	
21–3	1st round	(Slovenia) Krka	87–89 a	83–67 h	
21–3	1st round	(France) Pau-Orthez	91–67 h	93–80 a	
21–3	1st round	(Greece) Iraklis	85–92 a	95–71 h	
21–3	1st round	(Federal Republic of Yugoslavia) Partizan	89–53 h	95–73 a	
21–3	Top 16	(Poland) Śląsk Wrocław	81–75 h	85–62 a	– h
21–3	QF	(Italy) Scavolini Pesaro	80–69 h	84–77 a	– h
21–3	SF	(Russia) CSKA Moscow	86–80; May 11, Palais Omnisports de Paris-Bercy, Paris		
21–3	F	(Greece) Panathinaikos	81–67; May 13, Palais Omnisports de Paris-Bercy, Paris		

== Worldwide competitions ==
Record	Round	Opponent club	
1977 FIBA Intercontinental Cup
3–2	League stage	(United States) Providence Friars	106–80; October 4, Pabellón de la Ciudad Deportiva del Real Madrid, Madrid
3–2	League stage	(Spain) Real Madrid	97–105; October 5, Pabellón de la Ciudad Deportiva del Real Madrid, Madrid
3–2	League stage	(Italy) Mobilgirgi Varese	100–108; October 6, Pabellón de la Ciudad Deportiva del Real Madrid, Madrid
3–2	League stage	(Brazil) Atlética Francana	101–98; October 7, Pabellón de la Ciudad Deportiva del Real Madrid, Madrid
3–2	League stage	(Mexico) Dragones de Tijuana	126–94; October 8, Pabellón de la Ciudad Deportiva del Real Madrid, Madrid
