= Jackie Dinkins =

American basketball player

Personal information
- Born: January 22, 1950 Gadsden, South Carolina, U.S.
- Died: March 7, 1983 (aged 33) Liège, Belgium
- Listed height: 6 ft 5 in (1.96 m)
- Listed weight: 210 lb (95 kg)

Career information
- College: Voorhees (1968–1971)
- NBA draft: 1971: 9th round, 150th overall pick
- Drafted by: Chicago Bulls
- Playing career: 1971–1983
- Position: Small forward
- Number: 23

Career history
- 1971–1972: Chicago Bulls
- 1973–1975: Rotterdam-Zuid
- 1978–1980: Standard Liège

Career highlights
- Eredivisie champion (1974); 2× First-team All-Eredivisie (1974, 1975); 2× Eredivisie All-Defense Team (1974, 1975)
- Stats at NBA.com
- Stats at Basketball Reference

Jackie Dinkins (January 22, 1950 – March 7, 1983) was an American professional basketball player. He spent one season in the National Basketball Association (NBA) with the Chicago Bulls during the 1971–72 season as a small forward.

== Professional career ==
Born in Gadsden, South Carolina, he was drafted by the Bulls in the ninth round (150^{th} overall) from Voorhees College. In his one NBA season, Jackie appeared in eighteen games, averaging 2.5 points, 1.1 rebounds, and 0.4 assists per game. He later played in Belgium.

From 1973 to 1975, he played two seasons for RZ (named Transol RZ for sponsorship reasons) in the Dutch Eredivisie. Dinkins helped RZ become a popular basketball team in Rotterdam. He helped RZ win the 1973–74 Eredivisie title, the first in club history. The next season, they played in the 1974–75 FIBA European Champions Cup, where Dinkins was the leading scorer in both games (22 and 25 points) in the first round against Crystal Palace.

In 1978, Dinkins signed with Standard Liège of the Belgian League.

== Personal ==
While playing in Liège Dinkins was diagnosed with a brain tumor. He traveled frequently to Boston for treatment. He died on March 7, 1983, in Liège at age 33.

Dinkins was in the process of becoming a Belgian naturalized citizen before his death.

== Career statistics ==
Legend
GP	Games played	GS	Games started	MPG	Minutes per game
FG%	Field goal percentage	3P%	3-point field goal percentage	FT%	Free throw percentage
RPG	Rebounds per game	APG	Assists per game	SPG	Steals per game
BPG	Blocks per game	PPG	Points per game	**Bold**	Career high

=== NBA ===
==== Regular season ====
Year	Team	GP	GS	MPG	FG%	FT%	RPG	APG	PPG
1971–72	Chicago	18	0	4.9	.415	.550	1.1	.4	2.5

==== Playoffs ====
Year	Team	GP	MPG	FG%	FT%	RPG	APG	PPG
1972	Chicago	1	1.0	1.000	–	.0	.0	2.0
