= Jan Dekker (basketball) =

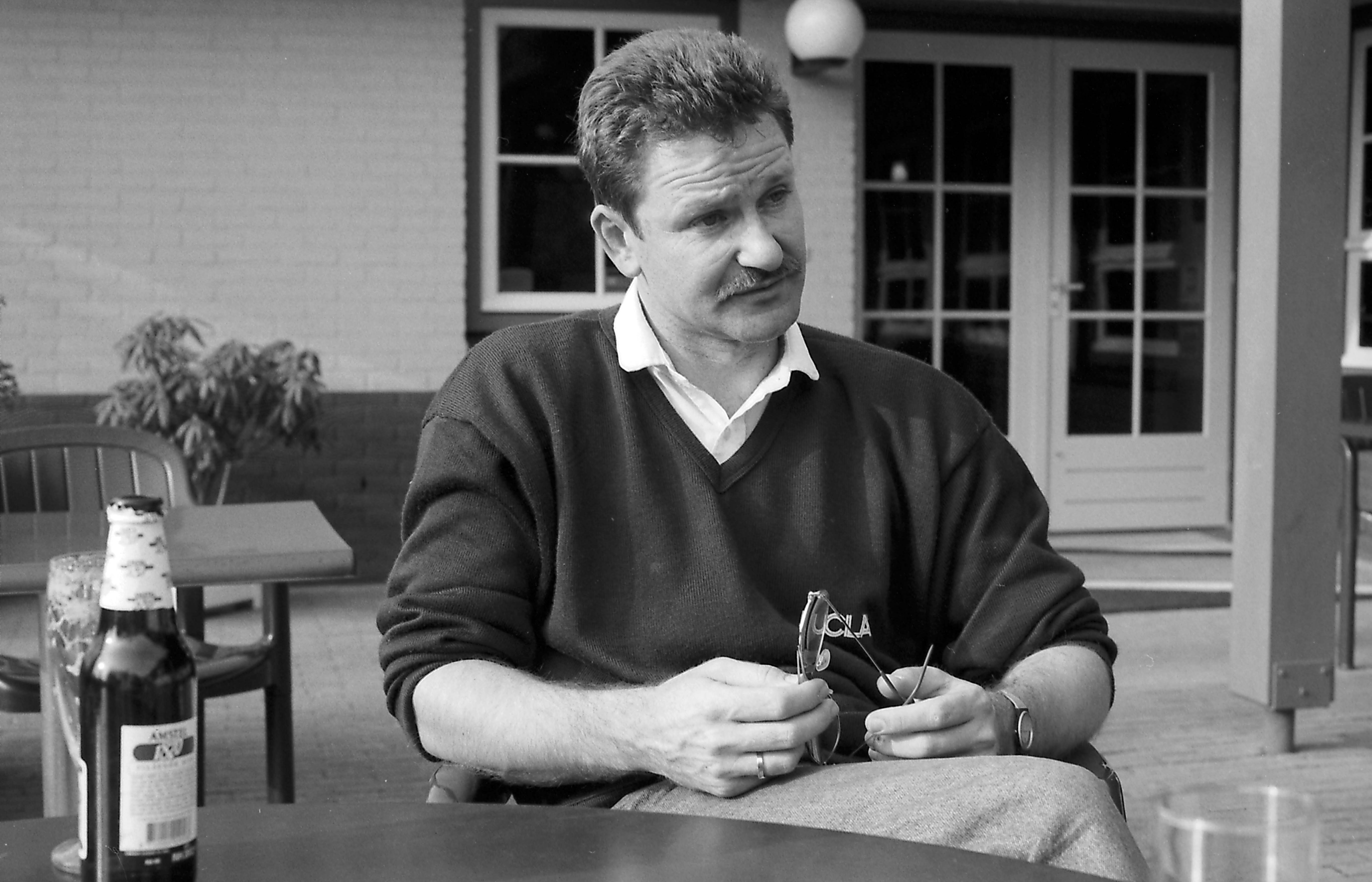
- Dekker in 1989

Personal information
- Born: 1 March 1950 (age 76)
- Listed height: 1.75 m (5 ft 9 in)

Career information
- Playing career: 1969–1983
- Position: Point guard

Career history

Playing
- 1969–1970: Haarlem Cardinals
- 1970–1976: Rotterdam-Zuid
- 1976–1983: EBBC Den Bosch

Coaching
- 1984–1985: EBBC Den Bosch (assistant)
- 1985–1988: EBBC Den Bosch

Career highlights
- As player: 4× Eredivisie champion (1979–1981, 1983); 2× First-team All-Eredivisie (1974, 1975); Eredivisie All-Defensive Team (1974); No. 5 retired by EBBC Den Bosch; As coach: 3× Eredivisie champion (1985, 1986, 1988); 2× Eredivisie Coach of the Year (1986, 1989)

Jan Dekker (born 1 March 1950) is a Dutch former basketball player and coach. Standing at 1.75 m (5 ft 9 in), he was a standout point guard who had his most notable years for Nashua Den Bosch.

== Playing career ==
Dekker started his career in 1969 with the Haarlem Cardinals, before signing with Rotterdam-Zuid the following year. He stayed with the team, that was also named Transol RZ during the time, for six seasons.

In 1976, he joined EBBC Den Bosch where he would stay for seven seasons until 1983. His number was retired by the club.

Over his career in the Dutch Eredivisie, Dekker averaged 12.1 points per game. Dekker also played 160 games for the Netherlands men's national basketball team, and ranks 5th all-time in games played.

== Coaching career ==
After playing for Den Bosch, Dekker became the team's assistant coach under Vladimír Heger in the 1984–85, before replacing him as head coach in January. He guided Den Bosch to the Dutch national championship in 1985, 1986 and 1988.
