= Ton Boot =

Dutch basketball player and coach

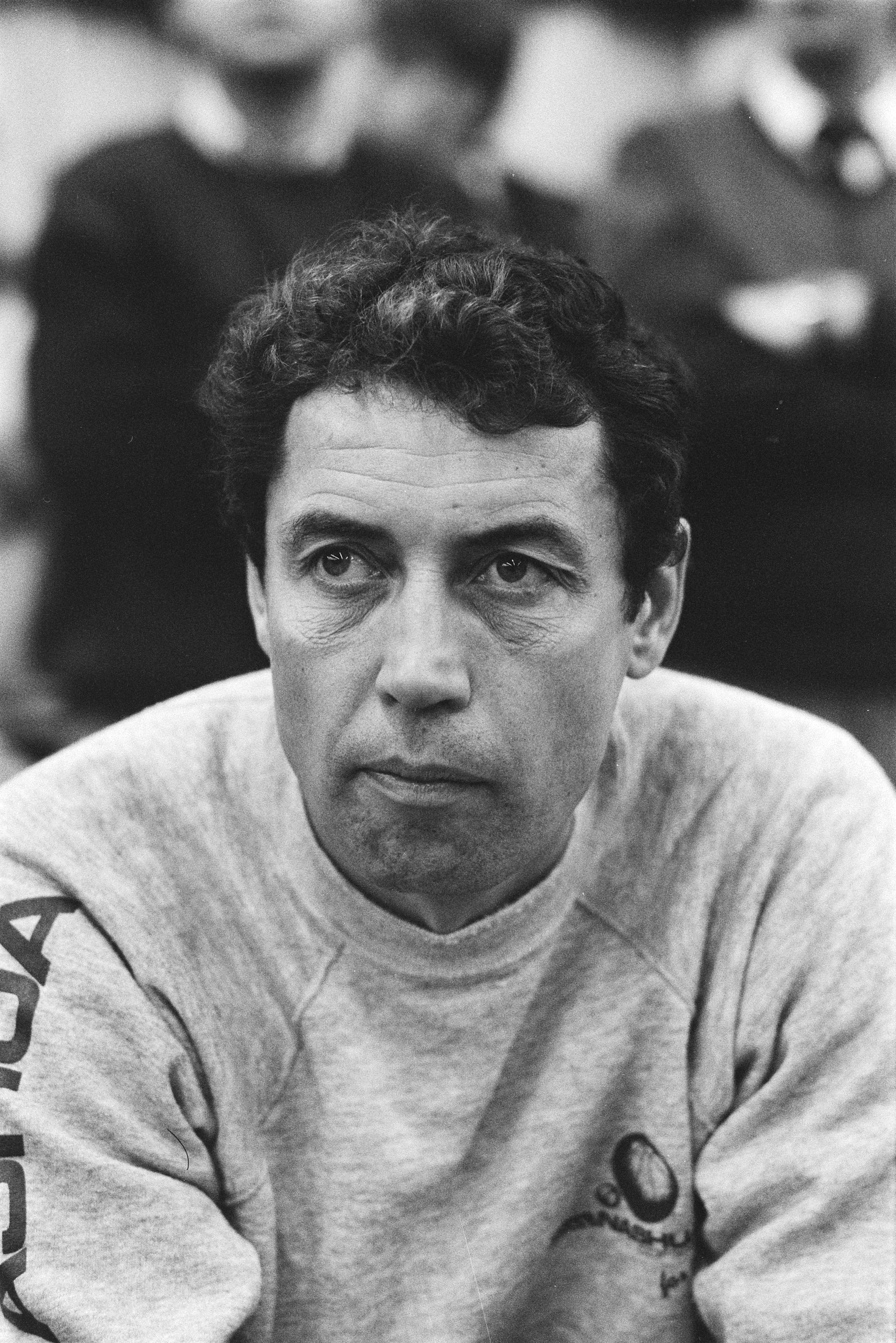
- Boot in 1984

Personal information
- Born: October 16, 1940 (age 86) Amsterdam, Netherlands
- Listed height: 1.86 m (6 ft 1 in)

Career information
- Playing career: 1958–1970
- Coaching career: 1978–2007

Career history

Playing
- 1958–1961: DED
- 1961–1965: The Wolves Amsterdam
- 1965–1970: Blue Stars

Coaching
- 1978–1980: EBBC Den Bosch
- 1980–1981: Parker Leiden
- 1982–1985: EBBC Den Bosch
- 1985–1993: Den Helder
- 1994–1997: Oostende
- 1998–2003: Amsterdam Astronauts
- 2003–2007: MPC Capitals

Career highlights
- As player: 5× Dutch League champion (1958, 1961, 1964, 1965, 1970); Dutch League All-Star (1974); As coach: 14× Dutch League champion (1978–1980, 1983, 1984, 1989–1992, 1999–2002, 2004); 3× Dutch Cup champion (1992, 1999, 2005); Belgian League champion (1995); Belgian Cup champion (1997); FEB Cup champion (2001); 7× Dutch League Coach of the Year (1979, 1980, 1984, 1987, 1988, 1993, 2001)

Antoine "Ton" Boot (born October 16, 1940) is a Dutch retired professional basketball coach and player. Boot is viewed as one of the best Dutch coaches ever, because of his 14 national titles in the Netherlands. The Dutch newspaper De Volkskrant named him the best Dutch sports coach of the 20th century.

== Playing career ==
In 1958 Boot won his first Dutch championship with DED Amsterdam. After that he won the national title another four times, in 1961, 1964 and 1965 with The Wolves Amsterdam and five years later with Blue Stars. In December 1959, Boot scored 53 points in a game against Monark, which was the all-time scoring record in the Dutch Basketball League until 1979, when Tony Parker Sr. scored 63 points.

In his career Boot also played for the Dutch national basketball team. He played his first game on April 1, 1959. He has eventually played 148 games for the Dutch national team.

== Personal life ==
He married basketball player Jenny Boot-Tigelaar on 20 September 1967.

== Coaching career ==
Boot started his coaching career in 1978 with EBBC Den Bosch, and immediately won three titles. After a less successful year with Parker Leiden he returned to Den Bosch, where he won two championships once again. In 1985 Boot left for Den Helder. With Den Helder, Boot won four straight championships. After that he left for Belgium to coach Oostende, in 1995 he won the Ethias League. In 1998 Boot became coach of ABC Amsterdam and he did win another four titles. In 2004 Boot won his last title, with the MPC Capitals from Groningen. In 2007, he retired.

Boot was the head coach of the Dutch national team in 1981.
