= 1966–67 FIBA European Champions Cup =

- League: FIBA European Champions Cup
- Sport: Basketball

Final Four
- Champions: (Spain) Real Madrid (3rd title)
- Runners-up: (Italy) Simmenthal Milano

FIBA European Champions Cup seasons
- ← 1965–66 1967–68 →

The 1966–67 FIBA FIBA European Champions Cup was the tenth season of the European top-tier level professional basketball club competition FIBA European Champions Cup (now called EuroLeague). The trophy was won by Real Madrid, for the third time, at their home venue Pavilion at the Sports City of Real Madrid, after they defeated Simmenthal Milano 91–83.

== Competition system ==
25 teams. European national domestic league champions, plus the then current FIBA European Champions Cup title holders only, playing in a tournament system. The competition culminated in a Final Four.

== First round ==
Team 1	Agg.	Team 2	1st leg	2nd leg
KR (Iceland)	127–203	(Italy) Simmenthal Milano	63–90	64–113
Fribourg Olympic (Switzerland)	104–171	(East Germany) Vorwärts Leipzig	61–84	43–87
Collegians (Northern Ireland)	0–4*	(Netherlands) Herly Amsterdam	0–2	0–2
Steaua București (Romania)	195–150	(Austria) Union Firestone Ehgartner	96–81	99–69
Honvéd (Hungary)	167–120	(Turkey) Galatasaray	94–55	73–65
USC Heidelberg (West Germany)	134–110	(Denmark) SISU	72–49	62–61
Alvik (Sweden)	135–154	(Finland) Torpan Pojat	63–69	72–85
Black Star Mersch (Luxembourg)	91–225	(Spain) Real Madrid	44–100	47–125
Wydad AC (Morocco)	117–158	(France) ASVEL	75–80	42–78

*Collegians from Belfast withdrew before the first leg and Herly Amsterdam received a forfeit (2-0) in both games.

== Second round ==
Team 1	Agg.	Team 2	1st leg	2nd leg
Torpan Pojat (Finland)	159–190	(Italy) Simmenthal Milano	79–100	80–90
Vorwärts Leipzig (East Germany)	127–116	(Poland) Legia Warsaw	57–51	70–65
Hapoel Tel Aviv (Israel)	0–4*	(Bulgaria) Lokomotiv Sofia	0–2	0–2
AEK (Greece)	110–122	(France) ASVEL	64–53	46–69
Herly Amsterdam (Netherlands)	156–159	(Socialist Federal Republic of Yugoslavia) AŠK Olimpija	74–72	82–87
Steaua București (Romania)	142–142**	(Czechoslovakia) Slavia VŠ Praha	76–72	66–70
USC Heidelberg (West Germany)	177–197	(Spain) Real Madrid	88–93	89–104
Honvéd (Hungary)	150–167	(Belgium) Racing Mechelen	80–76	70–91

*Hapoel Tel Aviv withdrew before the first leg and Lokomotiv Sofia received a forfeit (2-0) in both games.

**After a 142 aggregate drew, a third decisive game was held in which Slavia VŠ Praha won 77–61.

== Quarterfinals group stage ==
The quarterfinals were played with a round-robin system, in which every Two Game series (TGS) constituted as one game for the record.

Key to colors
Top two places in each group advance to Semifinals

=== Group A ===
	Team	Pld	Pts	W	L	PF	PA	PD
1.	(Spain) Real Madrid	3	6	3	0	502	449	+53
2.	(Czechoslovakia) Slavia VŠ Praha	3	5	2	1	497	458	+39
3.	(East Germany) Vorwärts Leipzig	3	4	1	2	401	433	-32
4.	(Bulgaria) Lokomotiv Sofia	3	3	0	3	454	514	-60

=== Group B ===
	Team	Pld	Pts	W	L	PF	PA	PD
1.	(Italy) Simmenthal Milano	3	6	3	0	593	526	+67
2.	(Socialist Federal Republic of Yugoslavia) AŠK Olimpija	3	4	1	2	487	480	+7
3.	(Belgium) Racing Mechelen	3	4	1	2	527	527	0
4.	(France) ASVEL	3	4	1	2	427	498	-71

== Final four ==
=== Semifinals ===
March 29, Sports City of Real Madrid Pavilion, Madrid

Team 1	Score	Team 2
Slavia VŠ Praha (Czechoslovakia)	97–103	(Italy) Simmenthal Milano
AŠK Olimpija (Socialist Federal Republic of Yugoslavia)	86–88	(Spain) Real Madrid

=== 3rd place game ===
April 1, Sports City of Real Madrid Pavilion, Madrid

Team 1	Score	Team 2
Slavia VŠ Praha (Czechoslovakia)	88-83	(Socialist Federal Republic of Yugoslavia) AŠK Olimpija

=== Final ===
April 1, Sports City of Real Madrid Pavilion, Madrid

Team 1	Score	Team 2
Real Madrid (Spain)	91–83	(Italy) Simmenthal Milano

1966–67 FIBA European Champions Cup
Champions

Real Madrid
3rd Title

=== Final standings ===
	Team
	(Spain) Real Madrid
2nd place, silver medalist(s)	(Italy) Simmenthal Milano
3rd place, bronze medalist(s)	(Czechoslovakia) Slavia VŠ Praha
	(Socialist Federal Republic of Yugoslavia) AŠK Olimpija

== Awards ==
=== FIBA European Champions Cup Finals Top Scorer ===
- (United States) Steve Chubin ( (Italy) Simmenthal Milano)
