= APGS Amsterdam =

Amsterdamse Politie Gymnastiek- & Sportvereniging (in English: Amsterdam Police Gymnastic and Sports Club) is a multi-sports club from Amsterdam. The club aims to enhance the physical and mental development of its members, especially the members of the Amsterdam Unit of the National Police.

== History ==
Officially Amsterdam Police Gymnastic and Sports Club, founded on May 20, 1915. The club has many sections like athletics, badminton, bodyfit, karate, kickboxing, ice skating, spinning, rugby, survival, tennis, futsal, sailing and swimming. In the 1940s the club had a basketball section, which also won the national league in 1948.
