= 1975–76 FIBA European Champions Cup =

- League: FIBA European Champions Cup
- Sport: Basketball

Final
- Champions: (Italy) Mobilgirgi Varese (5th title)
- Runners-up: (Spain) Real Madrid

FIBA European Champions Cup seasons
- ← 1974–75 1976–77 →

The 1975–76 FIBA European Champions Cup was the 19th edition of the European top-tier level professional basketball club competition FIBA European Champions Cup (now called EuroLeague). The Final was held at the Patinoire des Vernets, in Geneva, Switzerland, on April 1, 1976. In a third consecutive final for these two teams, Mobilgirgi Varese defeated Real Madrid, by a result of 81–74.

== Competition system ==
23 teams. European national domestic league champions, plus the then current FIBA European Champions Cup title holders only, playing in a tournament system. The Final was a single game, played on a neutral court.

== First round ==
Team 1	Agg.	Team 2	1st leg	2nd leg
Beşiktaş (Turkey)	151–173	(Switzerland) Federale	90–70	61–103
Al-Zamalek (Egypt)	133–167	(Bulgaria) Academic	69–74	64–93
Resovia Rzeszów (Poland)	185–137	(Syria) Jeunesse Sportivo Alep	109–67	76–70
Alvik (Sweden)	134–135	(Finland) Turun NMKY	76–67	58–68

== Second round ==
Team 1	Agg.	Team 2	1st leg	2nd leg
ÍR (Iceland)	0–4*	(Spain) Real Madrid	0–2	0–2
T71 Dudelange (Luxembourg)	123–207	(Italy) Birra Forst Cantù	76–97	47–110
Federale (Switzerland)	162–158	(Czechoslovakia) Dukla Olomouc	91–73	71–85
Gießen 46ers (West Germany)	158–159	(Bulgaria) Academic	89–75	69–84
Resovia Rzeszów (Poland)	156–164	(Austria) Sefra Wien	83–88	73–76
Embassy All-Stars (England)	153–207	(Netherlands) Transol RZ	87–90	66–117
Panathinaikos (Greece)	151–156	(Finland) Turun NMKY	96–78	55–78

*While they were eligible as the national champions to do so, ÍR never intended to participate in the tournament due to high costs involved and thus didn't register for it nor pay the participation fees. A letter by the Icelandic Basketball Association which informed FIBA on which Icelandic teams where eligible to participate in official FIBA tournaments was mistakenly taken as a confirmation of their participation. Due to the mistake, Real Madrid went through with a walkover.

Automatically qualified to the group stage

- (Italy) Mobilgirgi Varese (title holder)
- (Socialist Federal Republic of Yugoslavia) Zadar
- (France) ASVEL
- (Belgium) Maes Pils
- (Israel) Maccabi Elite Tel Aviv

== Quarterfinals group stage ==
The quarterfinals were played with a round-robin system, in which every Two Game series (TGS) constituted as one game for the record.

Key to colors
Top two places in each group advance to Semifinals

=== Group A ===
	Team	Pld	Pts	W	L	PF	PA	PD
1.	(Italy) Mobilgirgi Varese	5	10	5	0	886	729	+157
2.	(France) ASVEL	5	9	4	1	783	764	+19
3.	(Belgium) Maes Pils	5	8	3	2	847	780	+67
4.	(Bulgaria) Academic	5	6	1	4	813	871	-58
5.	(Finland) Turun NMKY	5	6	1	4	784	913	-129
6.	(Socialist Federal Republic of Yugoslavia) Zadar	5	6	1	4	817	873	-56

=== Group B ===
	Team	Pld	Pts	W	L	PF	PA	PD
1.	(Spain) Real Madrid	5	10	5	0	1070	869	+201
2.	(Italy) Birra Forst Cantù	5	9	4	1	960	849	+111
3.	(Israel) Maccabi Elite Tel Aviv	5	8	3	2	894	905	-11
4.	(Austria) Sefra Wien	5	7	2	3	833	839	-6
5.	(Netherlands) Transol RZ	5	6	1	4	855	1025	-170
6.	(Switzerland) Federale	5	5	0	5	859	984	-125

== Semifinals ==
Team 1	Agg.	Team 2	1st leg	2nd leg
Mobilgirgi Varese (Italy)	173–155	(Italy) Birra Forst Cantù	95–85	78–70
Real Madrid (Spain)	212–178	(France) ASVEL	113–77	99–101

== Final ==
April 1, Patinoire des Vernets, Geneva

Team 1	Score	Team 2
Mobilgirgi Varese (Italy)	81–74	(Spain) Real Madrid

1975–76 FIBA European Champions Cup
Champions

Mobilgirgi Varese
5th Title

== Awards ==
=== FIBA European Champions Cup Finals Top Scorer ===
- (United States) Bob Morse ( (Italy) Ignis Varese)
