= 1967–68 FIBA European Champions Cup =

- League: FIBA European Champions Cup
- Sport: Basketball

Final
- Champions: (Spain) Real Madrid (4th title)
- Runners-up: (Czechoslovakia) Spartak ZJŠ Brno

FIBA European Champions Cup seasons
- ← 1966–67 1968–69 →

1967–68 FIBA European Champions Cup was the eleventh installment of the European top-tier level professional basketball club competition FIBA European Champions Cup (now called EuroLeague). The Final was held at the Palais des Sports, Lyon, France, on April 11, 1968, and it was won by Real Madrid, who defeated Spartak ZJŠ Brno, by a result of 98–95.

== Competition system ==
- 24 teams (European national domestic league champions, plus the then current title holders), playing in a tournament system, played knock-out rounds, on a home and away basis. The aggregate score of both games decided the winner.
- The eight teams qualified for 1/4 Finals were divided into two groups of four. Every team played against the other three in its group, in consecutive home-and-away matches, so that every two of those games counted as a single win or defeat (point difference being a decisive factor there). In case of a tie between two or more teams after the group stage, the following criteria were used to decide the final standings: 1) one-to-one games between the teams; 2) basket average; 3) individual wins and defeats.
- The group winners and runners-up of the 1/4 Finals round qualified for 1/2 Finals. The final was played at a predetermined venue.

== First round ==
Team 1	Agg.	Team 2	1st leg	2nd leg
Maccabi Tel Aviv (Israel)	165–144	(France) Alsace de Bagnolet	85–62	80–82
Alvik (Sweden)	128–139	(Finland) KTP	67–67	61–72
Boroughmuir (Scotland)	112–234	(Spain) Real Madrid	69–108	43–126
ASFAR (Morocco)	121–205	(Spain) Juventud Kalso	70–96	51–109
Racing Luxembourg	113–148	(West Germany) Gießen 46ers	63–76	50–72
Honvéd (Hungary)	129–136	(Socialist Federal Republic of Yugoslavia) Zadar	86–72	43–64
Steaua București (Romania)	124–126	(Greece) Panathinaikos	82–65	42–61
Vauxhall Motors (England)	97–236	(Poland) Legia Warsaw	56–93	41–143

== Second round ==
Team 1	Agg.	Team 2	1st leg	2nd leg
Panathinaikos (Greece)	141–159	(Socialist Federal Republic of Yugoslavia) Zadar	79–70	62–89
KTP (Finland)	147–178	(Bulgaria) CSKA Cherveno zname	86–89	61–89
SVE Utrecht (Netherlands)	133–202	(Spain) Real Madrid	66–90	67–112
Juventud Kalso (Spain)	157–113	(Poland) Legia Warsaw	87–56	70–57
Gießen 46ers (West Germany)	134–189	(Israel) Maccabi Tel Aviv	72–84	62–105
Benfica Luanda (Portugal)	133–261	(Belgium) Racing Bell Mechelen	59–90	74–171
Engelmann Wien (Austria)	135–171	(Italy) Simmenthal Milano	79–95	56–76
Altınordu (Turkey)	130–167	(Czechoslovakia) Spartak ZJŠ Brno	61–65	69–102

== Quarterfinals group stage ==
The quarterfinals were played with a round-robin system, in which every Two Game series (TGS) constituted as one game for the record.

Key to colors
Top two places in each group advance to Semifinals

=== Group A ===
	Team	Pld	Pts	W	L	PF	PA	PD
1.	(Socialist Federal Republic of Yugoslavia) Zadar	3	6	3	0	433	409	+24
2.	(Italy) Simmenthal Milano	3	5	2	1	490	451	+39
3.	(Spain) Juventud Kalso	3	4	1	2	427	467	-40
4.	(Bulgaria) CSKA Cherveno zname	3	3	0	3	500	523	-23

=== Group B ===
	Team	Pld	Pts	W	L	PF	PA	PD
1.	(Czechoslovakia) Spartak ZJŠ Brno	3	6	3	0	539	482	+57
2.	(Spain) Real Madrid	3	5	2	1	501	482	+19
3.	(Israel) Maccabi Tel Aviv	3	4	1	2	381	407	-26
4.	(Belgium) Racing Bell Mechelen	3	3	0	3	350	400	-50

== Semifinals ==
Team 1	Agg.	Team 2	1st leg	2nd leg
Real Madrid (Spain)	144–127	(Socialist Federal Republic of Yugoslavia) Zadar	76–62	68–65
Simmenthal Milano (Italy)	150–166	(Czechoslovakia) Spartak ZJŠ Brno	64–63	86–103

== Final ==
April 11, Palais des Sports de Gerland, Lyon

Team 1	Score	Team 2
Real Madrid (Spain)	98–95	(Czechoslovakia) Spartak ZJŠ Brno

1967–68 FIBA European Champions Cup
Champions

Real Madrid
4th Title

== Awards ==
=== FIBA European Champions Cup Finals Top Scorer ===
- (United States) Miles Aiken ( (Spain) Real Madrid)
