= Heroes Den Bosch =

Coordinates: 51°43′21.64″N 5°18′55.87″E

- Leagues: BNXT League
- Founded: 18 October 1952; 74 years ago
- Arena: Maaspoort
- Capacity: 2,700
- Location: 's-Hertogenbosch, Netherlands
- Team colors: Red, White, Blue
- General manager: Vincent Nguyen
- Head coach: Erik Braal
- Team captain: Luuk van Bree
- Ownership: Bram Krijnen; Johan Daams
- 2025–26 position: BNXT League, 6th of 21
- Championships: 18 Dutch Championships; 9 Dutch Cups; 4 Dutch Supercups; 1 Ricoh Cup; 1 Haarlem Basketball Week
- Retired numbers: 5 (5, 9, 12, 12, 7)
- Website: heroesdenbosch.com
Home	Away

Heroes Den Bosch is a Dutch professional basketball club based in 's-Hertogenbosch. The club plays in the BNXT League since 2021 and in the top basketball division in the Netherlands since 1972. Founded as EBBC in 1951, the club had several sponsored names the following decades.

Den Bosch has won a record seventeen Dutch championships, a record nine Dutch Cups and two Dutch Supercup titles. The team has also been a regular at European competitions, most recently the FIBA Europe Cup. Heroes plays their home games at the Maaspoort, which has a capacity of approximately 2,700 people.

== History ==
On 18 October 1952, Eerste Bossche Basketball Club (EBBC) was founded by Cees Vossen, Tom van der Leur, Hans van Oorschot and Frans van de Wiel. In 1962, Den Bosch played in the top division Eredivisie for the first time, but not very successful. Subsequently, the team was relegated again. In 1979, EBBC won its first title. In 1980, the team became Nashua Den Bosch after its new main sponsor. Its increased budget led to six consecutive Dutch titles between 1982 and 1987.

=== Nashua Den Bosch in the 1980s ===
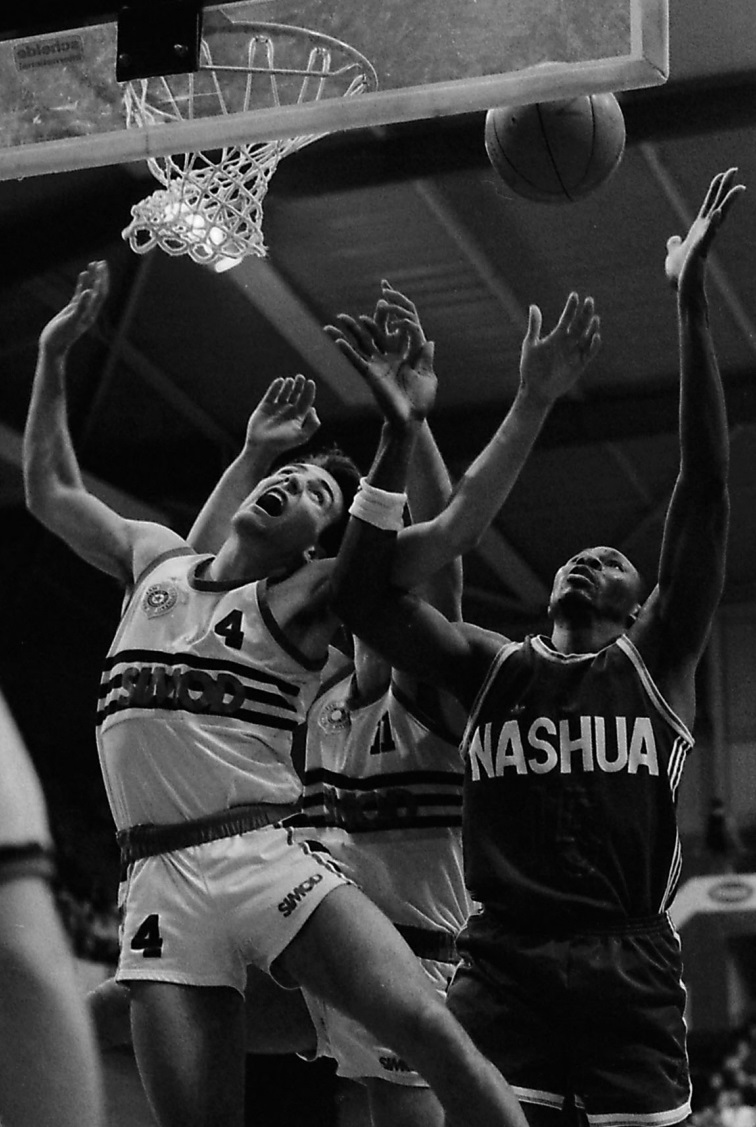
Star player Mike Reddick, to the right of Aleksandar Đorđević, in 1988

In December 1979, Nashua signed as the club's new main sponsor. In the next 10 years, Nashua won 9 national championships and was close to the European top clubs. Star players such as Tom Barker, Dan Cramer, Mitchell Plaat, David Lawrence, Henk Pieterse, Paul Thompson and Mike Reddick played for Nashua in this decade.

Den Bosch changed its home arena to the newly built Maaspoort, increasing its home capacity from 1,200 to 3,500. Nashua played in the 1979 FIBA Intercontinental Cup.

=== EiffelTowers (2005–2013) ===
Decades later, in June 2005, Den Bosch merged with EiffelTowers Nijmegen to form EiffelTowers Den Bosch. Following the merger the club had one of the largest budgets in the Netherlands, and with that they were able to attract high-quality players. In their first season they had immediate success by winning the Dutch League title. The year after that (2006–07) EiffelTowers The Bosch would win the title again after a clean sweep against the Matrixx Magixx, after losing only four games in the regular season. The two following years, Den Bosch reached the finals, but lost twice to Amsterdam.

In 2012, EiffelTowers won its fifteenth Dutch championship, after beating ZZ Leiden 1–4 in a best-of-seven-series.

=== SPM Shoeters (2013–2016) ===
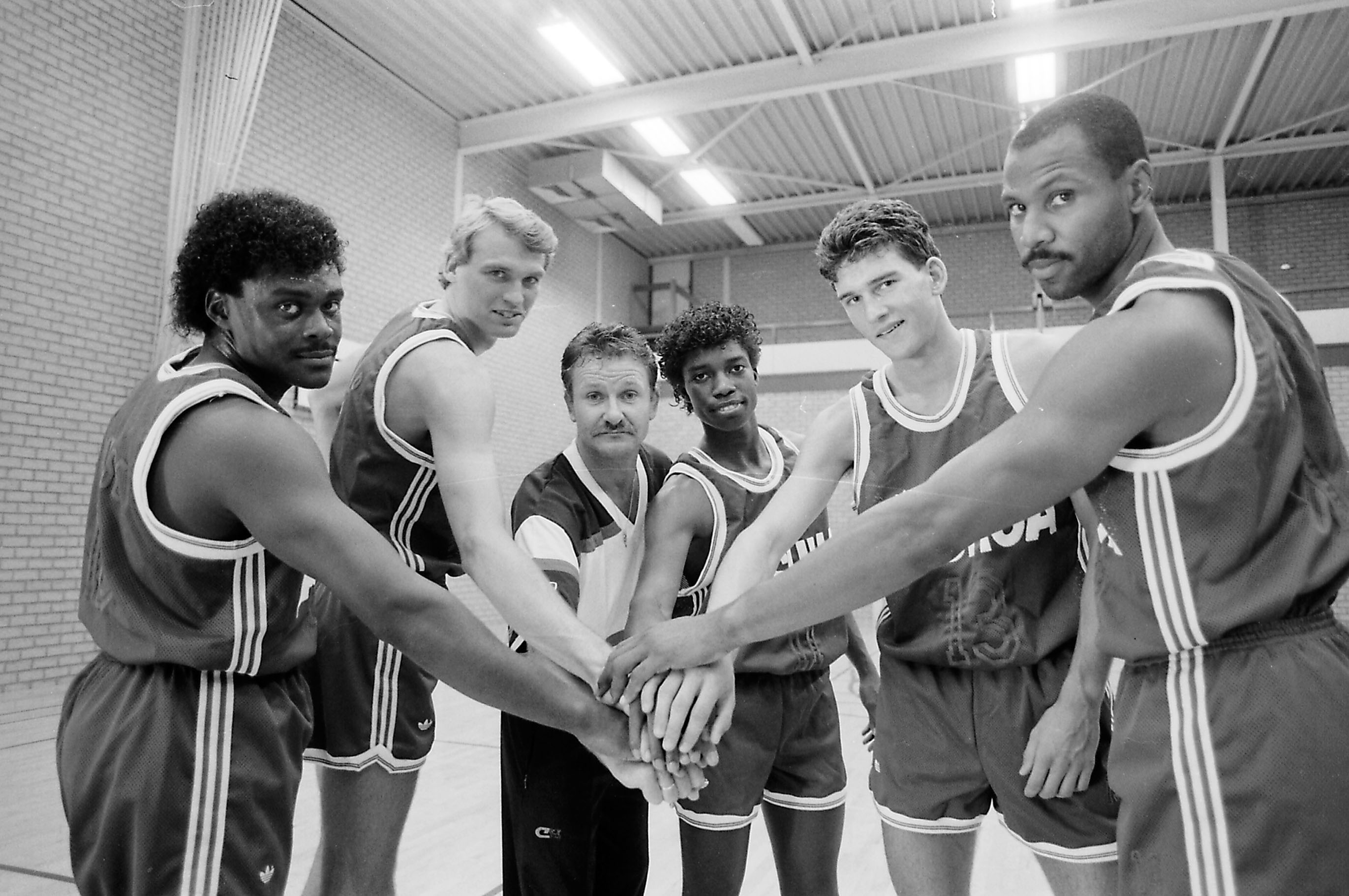
Nashua presenting five new players in 1987

After 13 years playing as the EiffelTowers, in 2013, the club changed its name to SPM Shoeters as a reference to its new main sponsor SPM Shoes and Boots, a shoe producer based in Waalwijk. Along with the name change the club changed the team colors to black, after playing in red since 2000.

In the 2014–15 season, Shoeters won its sixteenth DBL championship after Donar was beaten 4–1 in the Finals. The team also performed excellently in the EuroChallenge that season, reaching the Top 16. Star of the season for Den Bosch was Brandyn Curry, who was named DBL Playoffs MVP.

After the 2015–16 season, it was revealed that Shoeters was dealing with serious financial problems which had the team on the edge of bankruptcy.

=== New Heroes (2016–2019) ===
In October 2016, the team was bought by Triple Double BV, a sports marketing enterprise. Owner of the company Bob van Oosterhout took over the club which was no longer in danger of dissolution. On 6 November 2016, Den Bosch found a new main sponsor and subsequently was named New Heroes Basketball after signing a three-year deal with the local online training platform New Heroes. In its first season as New Heroes, the club finished fourth in the DBL and was swept by Donar in the semi-finals.

In the 2017–18 season, Croatian coach Silvano Poropat signed a two-year contract. Under Poropat, Heroes finished fourth once again but was eliminated in the quarterfinals by Rotterdam Basketbal. Following the disappointing season, Poropat and Heroes parted ways.

On 31 May 2018, Kees Akerboom Jr. announced his retirement at age 34. Akerboom, who played 11 seasons for the club, had his jersey number 12 retired.

For the 2018–19 season, Ivica Skelin was appointed as head coach. This season, New Heroes played in the FIBA Europe Cup after a European absence of 3 years. In Group D, Heroes had a 3–3 record and finished in third place. In the DBL playoffs, Den Bosch was once again eliminated in the semifinals, this time by Landstede.

=== Heroes Den Bosch (2019–present) ===
On 21 August 2019, the club announced it was changing its name to Heroes Den Bosch and it is not planning to change the club name anymore. In June, Heroes signed Jean-Marc Jaumin as its new head coach.

On 15 June 2021, Heroes signed three-time DBL champion Erik Braal as head coach. In the 2021–22 season, the DBL merged with the PBL into the BNXT League, in which the national leagues of Belgium and the Netherlands are combined. On 29 May 2022, Heroes ended a 7-year drought when it won its seventeenth national championship, beating ZZ Leiden in the finals series 3–2.

In the 2023–24 and 2024–25 seasons, Heroes won consecutive Dutch Cups.

== Logos ==
Heroes Den Bosch logos

2009–2013

2013–2016

2017–2019

2019–now

== Home arenas ==
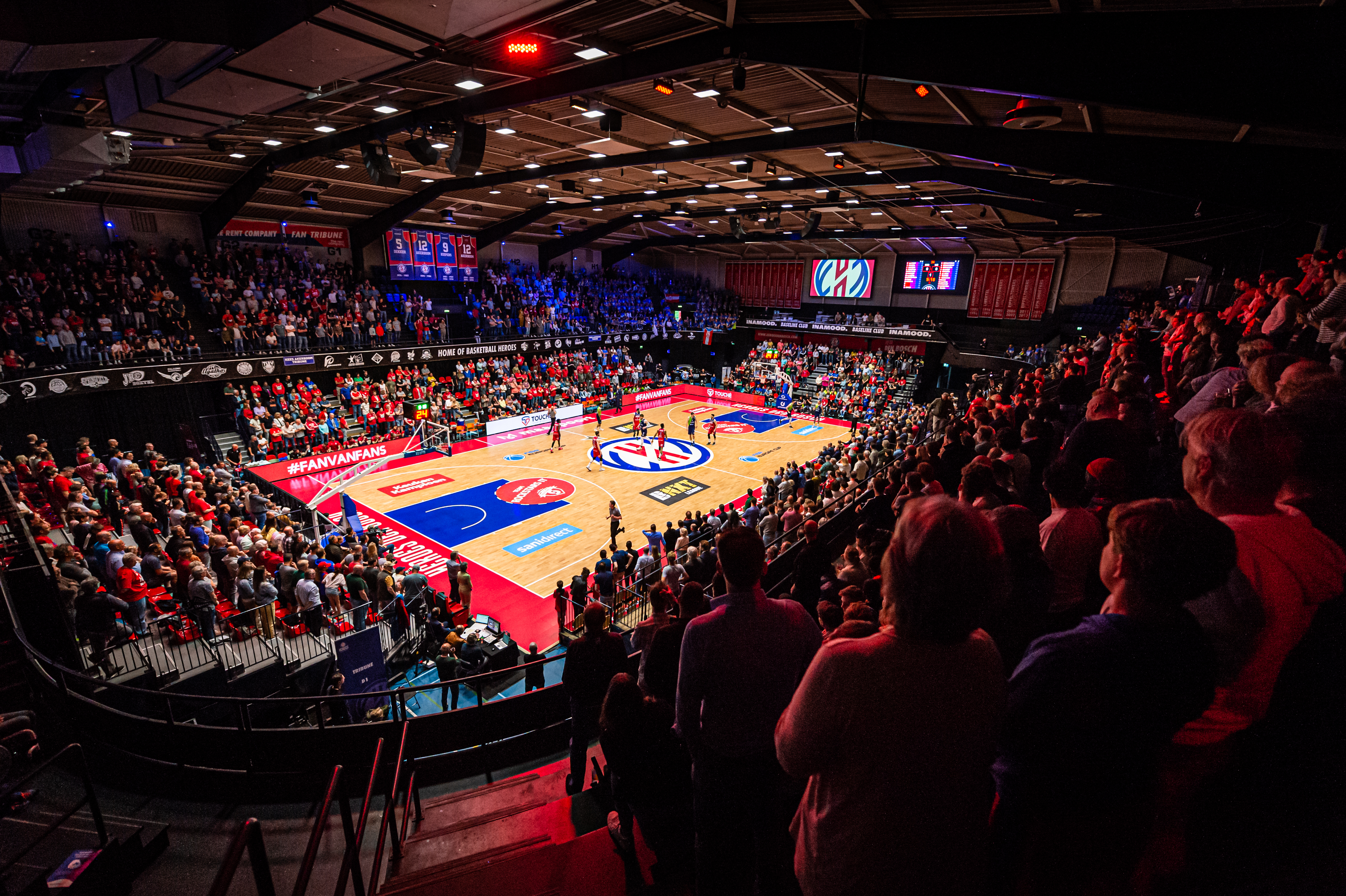
Interior view of the Maaspoort during a finals game in 2022

After many successful seasons by Nashua Den Bosch in the 1980s, a true basketball hall was built with the Maaspoort. The arena was opened on 3 September 1982 with a game against the NBA All-Stars.

- De Vinkenkamp
- Maaspoort: 1982–present

== Honours ==
=== Domestic ===
Dutch National Champions (record)

- Winners (18): 1978–79, 1979–80, 1980–81, 1982–83, 1983–84, 1984–85, 1985–86, 1986–87, 1987–88, 1992–93, 1995–96, 1996–97, 2005–06, 2006–07, 2011–12, 2014–15, 2021–22, 2024–25

Dutch Cup (record)

- Winners (9): 1992–93, 1999–00, 2001–02, 2007–08, 2008–09, 2012–13, 2015–16, 2023–24, 2024–25

Dutch SuperCup

- Winners (4): 2013, 2015, 2022, 2025

Ricoh Cup

- Winners (1): 2000

=== European ===
FIBA Saporta Cup

- Runner-up (1): 1978–79

=== Worldwide ===
FIBA Intercontinental Cup

- Runners-up (1): 1982

=== Friendly ===
Haarlem Basketball Week

- Winners (1): 2006

== All-time records ==
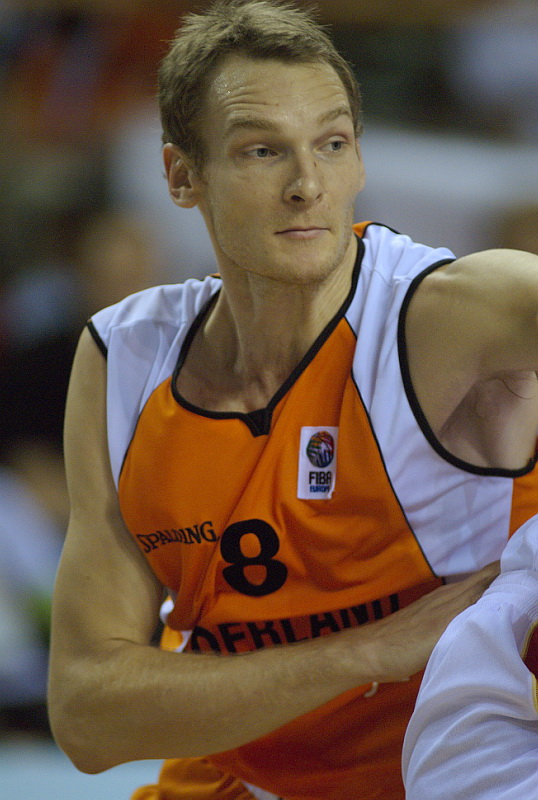
Kees Akerboom, Jr. holds the record for most games played

- Most Dutch Basketball League champions (17 championships)
- Most games played: Kees Akerboom, Jr. (671 games)

== Players ==
=== Retired numbers ===
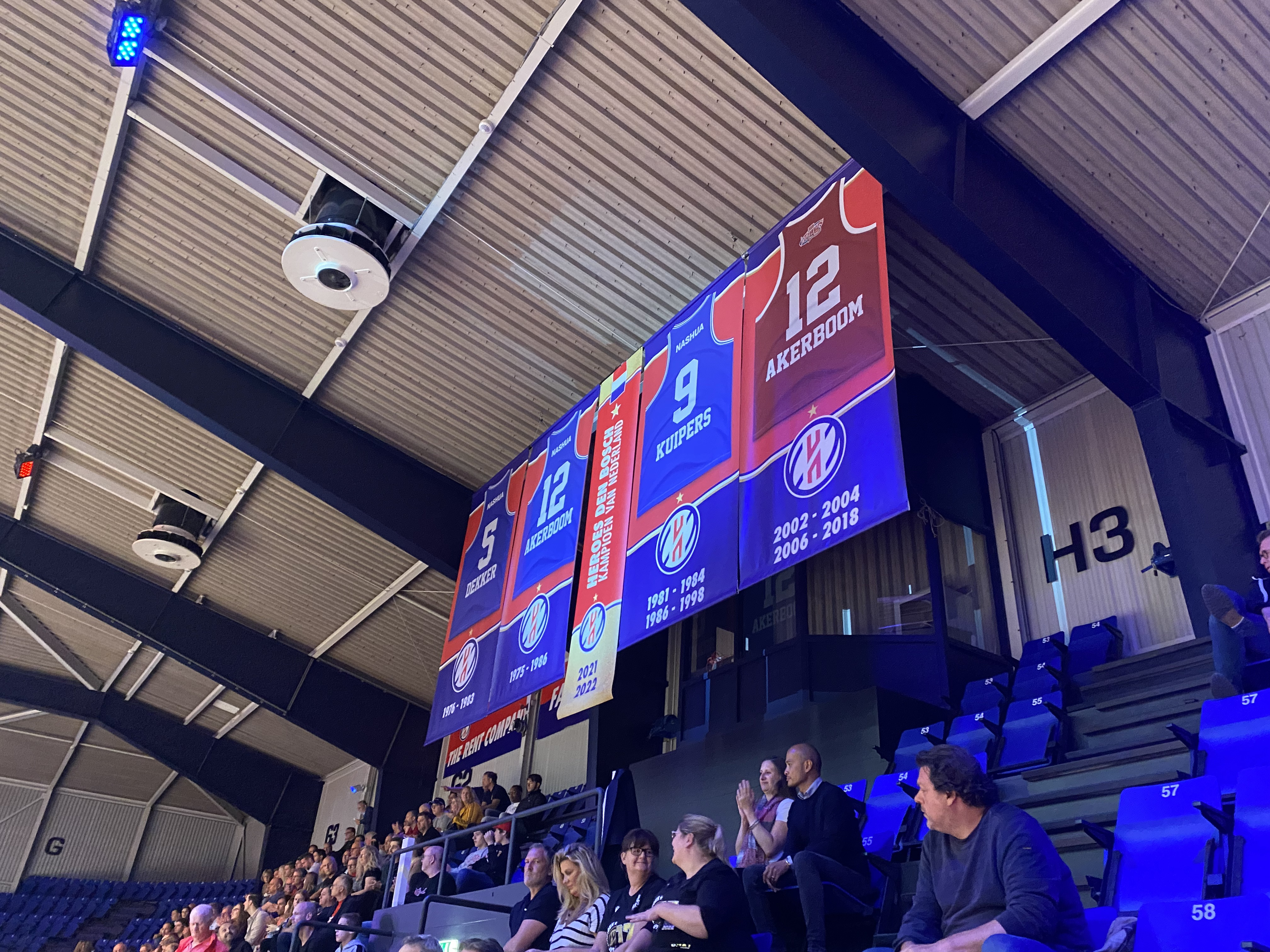
Retired numbers hanging in the Maaspoort

Heroes Den Bosch retired numbers
No	Player	Position	Tenure	Retirement date
5	Jan Dekker	G	1976–1983	
9	Jos Kuipers	PF/C	1981–1984, 1986–1999	9 December 2021
12	Kees Akerboom Sr.	G	1975–1986	
12	Kees Akerboom Jr.	SG	2001–2004, 2006–2018	23 September 2018

=== Current roster ===
Heroes Den Bosch roster
Players
Coaches

Pos.	No.	Nat.	Name	Ht.	Age
G	2	(Netherlands)	van Gestel, Joep	1.93 m (6 ft 4 in)	18 – 18 July 2008
F	6	(Netherlands)	van der Lek, Jonathan	2.01 m (6 ft 7 in)	17 – 4 July 2009
F	10	(Netherlands)	Bouwer, Maik	2.02 m (6 ft 8 in)	27 – 13 February 1999
G	11	(United States)	Hunter, Alex	1.80 m (5 ft 11 in)	27 – 24 February 1999
G	14	(Netherlands)	Metz, Joris	1.97 m (6 ft 6 in)	21 – 29 July 2005
F	20	(Netherlands)	van Bree, Luuk (C)	2.03 m (6 ft 8 in)	30 – 24 February 1996
C	21	(Netherlands)	Dijkstra, Menno	2.13 m (7 ft 0 in)	29 – 11 January 1997
F/C	22	(Canada)	Diouf, Ismaël	2.13 m (7 ft 0 in)	24 – 4 April 2002
PG	31	(United States)	Price, Austin	1.93 m (6 ft 4 in)	31 – 16 September 1995
F/C	46	(Netherlands)	van Holst, Niels	2.05 m (6 ft 9 in)	22 – 26 August 2004
F	47	(United States)	Harper, JJ	1.96 m (6 ft 5 in)	24 – 19 April 2002
G	90	(Netherlands)	Kloof, Charlon	1.91 m (6 ft 3 in)	36 – 20 March 1990

Head coach

- (Netherlands) Erik Braal

Assistant coach(es)

- (Netherlands) Mike de Kraker

Strength & conditioning coach(es)

- (Netherlands) Bart Verberkmoes

Legend

- (C) Team captain
- (DP) Development player
- (I) Import player
- Injured

- Roster
- Transactions
Updated: November 2, 2026

=== Notable players ===
Note: Flags indicate national team eligibility at FIBA-sanctioned events. Players may hold other non-FIBA nationalities not displayed.

Criteria

To appear in this section a player must have either:

- Set a club record or won an individual award while at the club
- Played at least one official international match for their national team at any time
- Played at least one official NBA match at any time.

- (Netherlands) Kees Akerboom, Sr.
- (Netherlands) Kees Akerboom, Jr.
- (Guam) Tai Wesley
- (Netherlands) Arvin Slagter
- (Finland) (Kosovo) Edon Maxhuni
- (United States) Brandyn Curry
- (United States) Ali Farokhmanesh
- (United States) DeJuan Wright
- (United States) David Gonzalvez
- (United States) Andre Young
- (United States) Frank Turner
- (United States) Sherron Dorsey-Walker
- (United States) Leon Rodgers
- (United States) Matt Bauscher
- (United States) Damone Brown
- (United States) Julien Mills
- (Netherlands) Leon Williams
- (Netherlands) Jeroen van der List
- (Netherlands) Sam Jones
- (United States) Dean Oliver
- (United States) Travis Reed
- (Estonia) Gert Kullamäe
- (Netherlands) Peter van Paassen
- (Netherlands) Stefan Wessels
- (Netherlands) Rogier Jansen
- (Netherlands) Maarten Bouwknecht
- (United Kingdom) Andrew Sullivan
- (Angola) Kikas Gomes
- (Netherlands) Dan Cramer

== Season by season ==
Season	Tier	League	Pos.	Dutch Cup	European competitions	
1996–97	1	DBL	1st		2 Saporta Cup	RS
1997–98	1	DBL	4th		2 Saporta Cup	RS
1998–99	1	DBL	4th			
1999–00	1	DBL	5th	Winner		
2000–01	1	DBL	3rd			
2001–02	1	DBL	6th	Winner		
2002–03	1	DBL	5th			
2003–04	1	DBL	2nd			
2004–05	1	DBL	5th			
EiffelTowers Den Bosch
2005–06	1	DBL	1st	Eighthfinalist	4 EuroCup Challenge	T16
2006–07	1	DBL	1st	Eighthfinalist	2 ULEB Cup	RS
2007–08	1	DBL	2nd	Winner	2 ULEB Cup	RS
2008–09	1	DBL	2nd	Winner	3 EuroChallenge	T16
2009–10	1	DBL	5th	Quarterfinalist	3 EuroChallenge	RS
2010–11	1	DBL	3rd	Semifinalist		
2011–12	1	DBL	1st	Quarterfinalist		
2012–13	1	DBL	3rd	Winner		
SPM Shoeters
2013–14	1	DBL	2nd	Semifinalist	3 EuroChallenge	RS
2014–15	1	DBL	1st	Runners-up	3 EuroChallenge	T16
2015–16	1	DBL	4th	Champions		
Heroes Den Bosch
2016–17	1	DBL	4th	Eighthfinalist		
2017–18	1	DBL	5th	Semifinalist		
2018–19	1	DBL	4th	Quarterfinalist	4 FIBA Europe Cup	RS
2019–20	1	DBL	3rd (Note: The 2019–20 season was cancelled prematurely in March 2020 because of the COVID-19 pandemic. No playoffs were played and no champions were named.)	Fourth round		
2020–21	1	DBL	2nd	Quarterfinalist	4 FIBA Europe Cup	R16
2021–22	1	BNXT League (National)	5th 1st	Runners-up	4 FIBA Europe Cup	RS
2022–23	1	BNXT League (National)	5th 3rd	Quarterfinalist	4 FIBA Europe Cup	R2
2023–24	1	BNXT League (National)	2nd 2nd	Champions	4 FIBA Europe Cup	RS
2024–25	1	BNXT League	NL 1st	Champions	3 Champions League	QR
2024–25	1	BNXT League	BNXT 8th	Champions	3 Champions League	QR
2025–26	1	BNXT League	NL 3rd	Semifinalist	3 Champions League	QR
2025–26	1	BNXT League	BNXT 6th	Semifinalist	3 Champions League	QR

== European record ==
Season	Competition	Round	Club	Home	Away	Agg
2013–14	EuroChallenge	Regular season	(Belgium) Antwerp Giants	83–76	72–77	3rd in Group A
2013–14	EuroChallenge	Regular season	(France) JDA Dijon	66–70	64–83	3rd in Group A
2013–14	EuroChallenge	Regular season	(Estonia) Rakvere Tarvas	78–71	70–57	3rd in Group A
2014–15	EuroChallenge	Regular season	(Italy) Brindisi	71–69	62–76	2nd in Group
2014–15	EuroChallenge	Regular season	(Germany) Ulm	87–76	82–91	2nd in Group
2014–15	EuroChallenge	Regular season	(Sweden) Södertälje Kings	115–108 (OT)	72–88	2nd in Group
2014–15	EuroChallenge	Second round	(Russia) Avtodor	107–108 (OT)	85–89	4th in Group K
2014–15	EuroChallenge	Second round	(Germany) Skyliners Frankfurt	92–94 (OT)	70–75	4th in Group K
2014–15	EuroChallenge	Second round	(Estonia) Tartu University	78–77	64–71	4th in Group K
2018–19	FIBA Europe Cup	Second qualifying round	(Bulgaria) Balkan	76–86	68–66	144–152
2018–19	FIBA Europe Cup	Regular season	(Russia) Avtodor	93–97	79–89	3rd place in Group
2018–19	FIBA Europe Cup	Regular season	(Israel) Ironi Nes Ziona	102–87	85–91	3rd place in Group
2018–19	FIBA Europe Cup	Regular season	(Czech Republic) JIP Pardubice	91–58	68–64	3rd place in Group
2020–21	FIBA Europe Cup	Regular season	(Russia) Parma	63–85 (N)		2nd place in Group F
2020–21	FIBA Europe Cup	Regular season	(Netherlands) Donar	99–98 (OT, N)		2nd place in Group F
2020–21	FIBA Europe Cup	Regular season	(Belarus) Borisfen	DNP		2nd place in Group F
2020–21	FIBA Europe Cup	Round of 16	(Poland) Stal Ostrów Wielkopolski	83–92 (N)		
2021–22	FIBA Europe Cup	Regular season	(Portugal) Benfica	76–78	78–73	3rd in Group C
2021–22	FIBA Europe Cup	Regular season	(Czech Republic) Opava	87–82	88–72	3rd in Group C
2021–22	FIBA Europe Cup	Regular season	(Russia) Parma	75–92	52–67	3rd in Group C
2022–23	FIBA Europe Cup	Regular season	(Portugal) FC Porto	82–64	71–68	1st in Group C
2022–23	FIBA Europe Cup	Regular season	(Switzerland) Fribourg Olympic	87–82	78–83	1st in Group C
2022–23	FIBA Europe Cup	Regular season	(Estonia) Pärnu	87–55	67–75	1st in Group C
2022–23	FIBA Europe Cup	Second round	(Turkey) Gaziantep	63–82	72–93	4th in Group K
2022–23	FIBA Europe Cup	Second round	(Estonia) Kalev/Cramo	86–72	63–73	4th in Group K
2022–23	FIBA Europe Cup	Second round	(Germany) Hakro Merlins Crailsheim	97–102	84–89	4th in Group K
2023–24	FIBA Europe Cup	Regular season	(Germany) Niners Chemnitz	66–77	61–88	4th in Group H
2023–24	FIBA Europe Cup	Regular season	(Poland) PGE Spójnia Stargard	89–92	65–73	4th in Group H
2023–24	FIBA Europe Cup	Regular season	(Kosovo) Peja	109–91	84–99	4th in Group H
2024–25	Champions League	Qualifying round Quarterfinals	(Turkey) Petkim Spor	72–92		
2025–26	Champions League	Qualifying round Quarter-finals	(Kosovo) KB Trepça	66–77		
2025–26	Champions League	Qualifying round Semi-finals	(Denmark) Bakken Bears	89–92		

Notes

1. Heroes Den Bosch points are listed first.
2. Despite losing, Heroes qualified for the regular season as "Lucky Loser".

== List of head coaches ==
Coach	Nationality	Tenure	Honours
Bill Sheridan	United States	1976–1977	
Ton Boot	Netherlands	1978–1980	2× Dutch Basketball League
Bill Sheridan	United States	1980–1982	1× Dutch Basketball League
Ton Boot	Netherlands	1982–1985	2× Dutch Basketball League
Charis Saideris	Netherlands	1989	
Toon van Helfteren	Netherlands	1997–1998	
Toon van Helfteren	Netherlands	2001–2005	
Randy Wiel	Netherlands	2005–2009	2× Dutch Basketball League, 2× NBB Cup
Don Beck	United States	2009–2010	
Maarten van Gent (interim)	Netherlands	2010	
Raoul Korner	Austria	2010–2013	1× Dutch Basketball League, 1× NBB Cup
Sam Jones	Netherlands	2013–2016	1× Dutch Basketball League, 1× NBB Cup, 1× Supercup
Sander van der Holst	Netherlands	2016–2017	
Silvano Poropat	Croatia	2017–2018	
Ivica Skelin	Croatia	2018–2019	
Jean-Marc Jaumin	Belgium	2019–2021	
Erik Braal	Netherlands	2021–present	2× Dutch champion, 2× Dutch Cup, 2× Supercup
