= SVE Utrecht =

Sport Vereninging Eendracht Utrecht (in English: Utrecht Concord Sports Club), also known as SVE Utrecht or Eendracht Utrecht, was a Dutch basketball club from Utrecht.

== History ==
Eendracht Utrecht was the first basketball club outside the city of Amsterdam, to win the Eredivisie the 1966–1967 season. The next season the club took part in the FIBA European Champions Cup where it played in the first round against the defending champions Real Madrid and eliminated with two easy defeats.

== Honours ==
Dutch League

- Winners (1): 1966-67

Dutch Cup

- Winners (1): 1967-68

== European record ==
Season	Competition	Round	Club	Home	Away
1967–68	FIBA European Champions Cup	R1	(Spain) Real Madrid	66–90	112–67
