= The Wolves Amsterdam =

The Wolves Amsterdam was a basketball club from Amsterdam which played from 1957 to 1968 in the Eredivisie. The club also came four seasons in the European competitions.

The club won its first Dutch championship basketball in 1957. From then it won the league title four more times. The Wolves Amsterdam is one of the 22 basketball clubs that participated in first edition of FIBA European Champions Cup in 1958.

== Honours ==
Dutch League

- Winners (5): 1956-57, 1959–60, 1960–61, 1963–64, 1964–65

== In Europe ==
Match table

Season	Competition	Round	Club	1st leg	2nd leg
1958	FIBA European Champions Cup	R1	(Italy) Simmenthal Milano	47–115 (a)	42–90 (h)
1960–61	FIBA European Champions Cup	R1	(Czechoslovakia) Sparta Prague	52–57 (h)	54–96 (a)
1961–62	FIBA European Champions Cup	R1	(France) Alsace Bagnolet	40–52 (h)	47–61 (a)
1964–65	FIBA European Champions Cup	R1	(Sweden) Alvik	84–82 (a)	65–73 (h)

== Notable players ==
- (Netherlands) Ton Boot (1961–65)
