= AMVJ Basketball =

AMVJ
- Founded: 1930; 95 years ago
- Arena: Ookmeerhal
- Capacity: 700
- Location: Amsterdam, Netherlands
- Team colors: Orange, Black
- President: Ernie Brush
- Championships: 3 Dutch League; 5 Dutch Women's League
- Website: www.amvj-basketball.nl
Home	Away

AMVJ Basketball, commonly known as AMVJ Amsterdam or AMVJ, is a Dutch basketball club from Amsterdam, part of the major multi-sport club AMVJ (Algemene Maatschappij Voor Jongeren / in English: General Society For Youth).

== History ==
AMVJ, as an association is called simply stands for General Society For Youth and the Dutch branch of the international Young People's Christian Association, better known as the YMCA.

When AMVJ in 1928 the decision was given on the building on the Leidsebosje, Mr. H. invited Rooswinkel an Englishman Lew Lake, a member of the London Central YMCA, to introduce into the Basketball AMVJ building among its members. Basketball hit and developed within AMVJ. In addition to the sporting and cultural activities that the omni-association AMVJ were already enjoying, founded the AMVJ-Basketball Division in 1930. Under the leadership of Dick Schmüll, when still a student physical education teacher and later was trained hard.

The first games were played were immediately at the international level against YMCA teams from London and Brussels. Meanwhile AMVJ received in her room several netball associations to acquaint them with the basketball sport. Thus it happened that from netball associations as DTV, Rohda and DED basketball clubs were established. In 1938, there were plenty of teams in Amsterdam to launch a competition. The Amsterdam Basketball Association (ABB) was founded. Several teams in Amsterdam and in particular the AMVJ teams played exhibition matches in various cities in the Netherlands and as it spread slowly basketball across the country. AMVJ is truly the cradle of playing basketball Netherlands. Until well into the sixties, the highest league in the Netherlands consisted mainly of Amsterdam teams. AMVJ did eagerly participate in the collection of land titles. The men's team were champions in 1949, 1951, 1955 and the women's then took the flag about in 1961, 1965, 1967, 1968 and 1970 champion to be.

With the advent of several experts in sports (especially from the United States) is AMVJ in basketball which disappeared from the highest treetje. Yet AMVJ has always assert know to blow with the ladies long Eredivisie level and gentlemen to two years into the national top. All in all AMVJ so the first Dutch basketball association, delivered the first coach (Dick Schmüll) and has spent years with her Lew-Lake tournament and other activities contributed to the promotion and further spread of basketball in the Netherlands.

== Honours ==
(Men)

Dutch League

- Winners (3): 1949, 1951, 1955

(Women)

Dutch Women's League

- Winners (5): 1960-61, 1964–65, 1966–67, 1967–68, 1969–70
