= BV Herly Amsterdam =

Basketbalvereniging Herly Amsterdam was a Dutch professional basketball club based in Amsterdam.

== History ==
Herly Amsterdam participated in DBL in the 1945–66 seasons. The club won its first champions title in 1966. The next year Herly participated in the FIBA European Champions Cup and reached to second round where it eliminated by AŠK Olimpija with aggregate score 156–159 (74–72 win in Amsterdam and 82–87 defeat in Ljubljana).

== Honours & achievements ==
Dutch League

- Winners (1): 1965–66
