= 1974–75 FIBA European Champions Cup =

- League: FIBA European Champions Cup
- Sport: Basketball

Final
- Champions: (Italy) Ignis Varese (4th title)
- Runners-up: (Spain) Real Madrid

FIBA European Champions Cup seasons
- ← 1973–74 1975–76 →

The 1974–75 FIBA European Champions Cup was the 18th edition of the European top-tier level professional basketball club competition FIBA European Champions Cup (now called EuroLeague). The Final was held at the Arena Deurne, in Antwerp, Belgium, on April 10, 1975. In a reprise of a previous year's final, Ignis Varese defeated Real Madrid, by a result of 79–65.

== Competition system ==
- 24 teams (European national domestic league champions, plus the then current title holders), playing in a tournament system, played knock-out rounds on a home and away basis. The aggregate score of both games decided the winner.
- The twelve teams qualified for the Quarterfinals were divided into two groups of six. Every team played against the other five in its group in consecutive home-and-away matches, so that every two of these games counted as a single win or defeat (point difference being a decisive factor there). In case of a tie between two or more teams after this group stage, the following criteria were used: 1) one-to-one games between the teams; 2) basket average; 3) individual wins and defeats.
- The group winners and the runners-up of the Quarterfinal Group Stage qualified for the Semifinals. The final was played at a predetermined venue.

== First round ==
Team 1	Agg.	Team 2	1st leg	2nd leg
Alvik (Sweden)	184–172	(Hungary) Csepel	91–70	93–102
Honka Playboys (Finland)	150–152	(West Germany) SSV Hagen	84–79	66–73
Fribourg Olympic (Switzerland)	154–188	(Greece) Panathinaikos	76–89	78–99
Sparta Bertrange (Luxembourg)	159–193	(Albania) Partizani Tirana	89–103	70–90
Transol RZ (Netherlands)	194–120	(England) Sutton & Crystal Palace	107–55	87–65

== Second round ==
Team 1	Agg.	Team 2	1st leg	2nd leg
Wisła Kraków (Poland)	173–180	(Sweden) Alvik	94–87	79–93
SSV Hagen (West Germany)	168–184	(Belgium) Maes Pils	85–81	83–103
Panathinaikos (Greece)	156–203	(Israel) Maccabi Elite Tel Aviv	76–90	80–113
Partizani Tirana (Albania)	0–4*	(Bulgaria) Balkan Botevgrad	0–2	0–2
Transol RZ (Netherlands)	185–141	(Turkey) Muhafızgücü	96–65	89–76
Slavia VŠ Praha (Czechoslovakia)	201–155	(Egypt) Al-Zamalek	110–65	91–90
Sefra Wien (Austria)	254–112	(Iceland) KR	132–34	122–78

*Partizani Tirana withdrew before the first leg, so Balkan Botevgrad went through with a walkover.

Automatically qualified to the group stage

- (Spain) Real Madrid (title holder)
- (Italy) Ignis Varese
- (France) Berck
- (Socialist Federal Republic of Yugoslavia) Zadar
- (Soviet Union) CSKA Moscow

== Quarterfinals group stage ==
The quarterfinals were played with a round-robin system, in which every Two Game series (TGS) constituted as one game for the record.

Key to colors
Top two places in each group advance to Semifinals

=== Group A ===
	Team	Pld	Pts	W	L	PF	PA	PD
1.	(Italy) Ignis Varese	5	10	5	0	990	789	+121
2.	(Socialist Federal Republic of Yugoslavia) Zadar	5	9	4	1	909	819	+90
3.	(Belgium) Maes Pils	5	8	3	2	895	879	+16
4.	(Austria) Sefra Wien	5	7	2	3	803	863	-60
5.	(Bulgaria) Balkan Botevgrad	5	6	1	4	746	889	-143
6.	(Czechoslovakia) Slavia VŠ Praha	5	5	0	5	771	875	-104

=== Group B ===
	Team	Pld	Pts	W	L	PF	PA	PD
1.	(Spain) Real Madrid	4	8	4	0	833	649	+184
2.	(France) Berck	4	6	2	2	708	723	-15
3.	(Israel) Maccabi Elite Tel Aviv	4	6	2	2	748	734	+14
4.	(Netherlands) Transol RZ	4	6	2	2	697	706	-9
5.	(Sweden) Alvik	4	4	0	4	609	783	-174
6.	(Soviet Union) CSKA Moscow*	0	0	0	0	0	0	0

*CSKA Moscow withdrew before the group stage for political reasons. Therefore, all the scheduled games of the Soviet team were considered forfeits (2–0) for their rivals, although they were not counted in the final standing of the group.

== Semifinals ==
Team 1	Agg.	Team 2	1st leg	2nd leg
Real Madrid (Spain)	239–199	(Socialist Federal Republic of Yugoslavia) Zadar	109–82	130–117
Berck (France)	164–184	(Italy) Ignis Varese	85–86	79–98

== Final ==
April 10, Arena Deurne, Antwerp

Team 1	Score	Team 2
Ignis Varese (Italy)	79–66	(Spain) Real Madrid

1974–75 FIBA European Champions Cup
Champions

Ignis Varese
4th Title

== Awards ==
=== FIBA European Champions Cup Finals Top Scorer ===
- (United States) Bob Morse ( (Italy) Ignis Varese)
