= DED Basketball Club =

Dutch basketball club

DED
- Leagues: Promotiedivisie
- Founded: 1909; 117 years ago
- Arena: Sporthal Diemen
- Capacity: 500
- Location: Amsterdam, Netherlands
- Team colors: White and Black
- Championships: 8 Dutch League
- Website: Official website
| Home | Away |

De Eerste Driejarige is a Dutch basketball club from the city of Amsterdam.

== History ==
DED has a long history going back in the year 1909, when a group of university students started this basketball club in Amsterdam. They gave it the name “De Eerste Driejarige” ("The First Three Years"). The club holds the 2nd place for the number of national championships in the Netherlands. All of them won in the 1940s and 1950s.

== Today ==
Nowadays, DED participates with four adult men's teams in both national and regional leagues. The team is still based in Amsterdam, playing their games in the Apollohal.

== Honours ==
Dutch League

- Winners (8): 1946, 1947, 1950, 1952, 1953, 1954, 1956, 1958
