= BV RZ =

RZ
- Founded: 1956; 70 years ago
- Arena: Topsportcentrum Rotterdam
- Capacity: 1,000
- Location: Rotterdam, Netherlands
- President: Ibro Hrusto
- Championships: 1 Dutch League
- Website: www.rotterdamzuid.com
| Home | Away |

Basketballvereniging Rotterdam-Zuid (in English: Rotterdam South Basketball Club), commonly known as RZ is a basketball club from Rotterdam.

== History ==
RZ was founded in 1956 and has for many years with a great commitment of board members, executives and also ordinary members and players, that can no longer think sports in sport country. RZ fought until the early nineties in the highest national league and even European Cup matches played at European level in Ahoy, as against Maccabi Elite Tel Aviv or Real Madrid. During the heyday played men like John Loorbach, Marcel Welch, Jan Dekker and the "Famous Mister" Jackie Dinkins who was a phenomenon far beyond the border. For years was the home of South Rotterdam, the sports hall Enk, sphere of activity.

After a successful period in earlier decades, RZ experienced difficulties in 1996 following a fire in the club house, while membership declined to around 60 members.

== Honours ==
=== Men's team ===
Eredivisie

- Winners (1): 1973-74

Dutch Cup

- Runners-up (2): 1972-73, 1974–75

=== Women's team ===
Dames Eredivisie

- Winners (2): 1976–77, 1977–78

== European record ==
| Season | Competition | Round | Club | Home | Away |
|---|---|---|---|---|---|
| 1974–75 | FIBA European Champions Cup | R1 | (England) Sutton & Crystal Palace | 107–55 | 65–87 |
| 1974–75 | FIBA European Champions Cup | R2 | (Turkey) Muhafızgücü | 96–65 | 76–89 |
| 1974–75 | FIBA European Champions Cup | QF | (Israel) Maccabi Tel Aviv | 85–94 | 89–90 |
| 1974–75 | FIBA European Champions Cup | QF | (Spain) Real Madrid | 89–81 | 104–74 |
| 1974–75 | FIBA European Champions Cup | QF | (Sweden) Alvik | 104–71 | 74–72 |
| 1974–75 | FIBA European Champions Cup | QF | (France) Berck | 94–84 | 74–72 |
| 1975–76 | FIBA European Champions Cup | R2 | (England) Embassy All-Stars | 117–66 | 87–90 |
| 1975–76 | FIBA European Champions Cup | QF | (Israel) Maccabi Tel Aviv | 87–86 | 118–86 |
| 1975–76 | FIBA European Champions Cup | QF | (Austria) Sefra Wien | 86–99 | 119–75 |
| 1975–76 | FIBA European Champions Cup | QF | (Italy) Cantù | 92–96 | 96–97 |
| 1975–76 | FIBA European Champions Cup | QF | (Switzerland) Federale | 82–85 | 91–98 |
| 1975–76 | FIBA European Champions Cup | QF | (Spain) Real Madrid | 85–111 | 124–97 |

== Notable players ==
Note: Flags indicate national team eligibility at FIBA-sanctioned events. Players may hold other non-FIBA nationalities not displayed.

Criteria

To appear in this section a player must have either:

- Set a club record or won an individual award while at the club
- Played at least one official international match for their national team at any time
- Played at least one official NBA match at any time.

- (Netherlands) John Loorbach
- (Netherlands) Marcel Welch
- (Netherlands) Jan Dekker
- (United States) Jacky Dinkins
