= Dutch Basketball League =

Sports league

- Formerly: Eredivisie (1960–2010)
- Founded: 1960; 66 years ago
- First season: 1960–61
- Folded: 2021
- Replaced by: BNXT League
- Country: Netherlands
- Confederation: FIBA Europe
- Number of teams: 12
- Level on pyramid: 1
- Domestic cup: NBB Cup
- Supercup: Dutch Supercup
- International cup(s): Basketball Champions League; FIBA Europe Cup
- Last champions: Landstede Hammers (2nd title) (2025–26)
- Most championships: Heroes Den Bosch (18 titles)
- All-time top scorer: Kees Akerboom Sr. (9,878 points)
- Website: www.dutchbasketballleague.nl

The Dutch Basketball League (DBL), formerly the Eredivisie, was the highest professional basketball league in the Netherlands, run by the Federatie Eredivisie Basketball (FEB). Since 2021, the league has been replaced by the Belgian-Dutch BNXT League.

The league had a closed system: to participate, a team has to have enough money and potential. The league began in 1960 as the Eredivisie and was organized by the NBB and later the FEB. In 1977 the league introduced play-offs. As of 2019, the Dutch Basketball League consists of ten teams and plays under the FIBA rules.

== History ==
=== 2010s ===
Starting with the 2010–11 season, the Eredivisie changed its name to the Dutch Basketball League, shortly the DBL. The beginning of the 2010s saw Donar and ZZ Leiden emerge as top teams in the Netherlands. Donar won five titles, including three straight (2015–2018). The decade also saw clubs disappear due to financial problems, with Amsterdam in 2011, West-Brabant Giants in 2011, Magixx in 2014. The decade also saw the emergence of new clubs in Apollo Amsterdam and Den Helder Suns.

In Europe, Donar had one of the biggest successes in Dutch history after reaching the semi-finals of the 2017–18 FIBA Europe Cup. It was the first European semi-final of a team since Amsterdam in 2001.

=== 2020s ===
In December 2019, it was announced that the DBL has partnered with the Belgian Pro Basketball League (PBL) to look at the potential of a future "BeNe League". The 2019–20 season was cancelled prematurely in March because of the COVID-19 pandemic. It was the first time in league history that a season was not finished and no champions were named. Due to the pandemic, entry requirements for the following season were lowered which led to the entrance of Basketball Community Gelderland, The Hague Royals and Almere Sailors.

== Format and rules ==
Each team has to play all the other teams in the league four times, twice at home and twice away. This means that the league's regular season ends after all teams play 36 matches. Like many other national domestic leagues in continental Europe, the Dutch Basketball League takes a winter break once each team has played half of its scheduled games.

=== Playoffs ===
At the end of the league season schedule, the eight best teams in the standings play in a play-off, pitting the first place team in the standings versus the eighth place team in the standings, and so on. The quarter finals are played in a best-of-three format and the semi-finals are played in a best-of-five format, and the finals are played in a best-of-seven format.

In seasons were the number of teams dropped to 9 or lower, six teams qualified for the playoffs. In this case, the numbers one and two qualified for the semifinals and the other four teams played the quarterfinals.

=== Foreign players ===
The DBL has had many rules in place to restrict the number of foreign players of clubs. This way the league seek to keep developing Dutch talent in the league. For several seasons. Until 2019, teams in the DBL were not allowed to have more than four players without a Dutch passport in their on court team at the same time.

- 2015–2017: maximum 4 foreign players
- 2017–2019: maximum 5 foreign players (1 Dutch player at the court any time)
- 2019–2021: minimum of 6 home grown players

== Logos ==
The first league logo, introduced in 2011

Updated version of the logo that was introduced in 2011, first used in the 2019–2020 season

== Clubs ==
=== Current clubs ===
As of the end of the 2020–21 season:

Club	City	Arena	Capacity	1st season in DBL	No. of seasons in DBL	DBL titles	Last title
Almere Sailors	Almere	Topsportcentrum Almere	3,000	2020–21	1	–	–
Apollo Amsterdam	Amsterdam	Apollohal	1,500	2012–13	8	–	–
Aris Leeuwarden	Leeuwarden	Kalverdijkje	1,700	2004–05	16	–	–
BAL	Weert	Sporthal Boshoven	1,000	2017–18	4	–	–
Heroes Den Bosch	's-Hertogenbosch	Maaspoort	2,800	1962–63	54	16	2015
Den Helder Suns	Den Helder	Sporthal Sportlaan	1,500	1981–82	29	6	1998
Donar	Groningen	MartiniPlaza	4,350	1970–71	51	7	2018
Feyenoord	Rotterdam	Topsportcentrum	2,400	1988–89	32	–	–
Landstede Hammers	Zwolle	Landstede Sportcentrum	1,200	1995–96	25	1	2019
The Hague Royals	The Hague	Sportcampus Zuiderpark	3,500	2020–21	1	–	–
Yoast United	Bemmel	De Schaapskooi	650	2020–21	1	–	–
ZZ Leiden	Leiden	Vijf Meihal	2,000	1967–68	31	4	2021

=== Timeline ===
The following is the timeline of the teams in the Dutch Basketball League era (since 2011).

- * – Indicates championship season

=== Former clubs ===
Location of teams in the 2020–21 Dutch Basketball League

The following clubs are not competing in the DBL during the 2020–21 season, but have previously competed in the DBL for at least one season. Teams in italics were folded and do not exist anymore. The following clubs are not competing in the BNXT League during the 2026–27 season, but have played at least one season in the Dutch top flight (Eredivisie or DBL). Seasons are counted from the first national championship in 1957–58. Teams in italics were folded and do not exist anymore.

Club	City	Current league (2026–27)	First season in DBL	Most recent season in DBL	Seasons in DBL	DBL titles	Last DBL title
Agon Amsterdam / Racing Agon	Amsterdam	–	1958–59	1972–73	13	–	–
Akrides Haarlem	Haarlem		1990–91	1992–93	3	–	–
Akrides IJmuiden	IJmuiden	Eerste Divisie	1987–88	1996–97	6	–	–
Almere Pioneers	Almere	Lower divisions	1998–99	2006–07	9	–	–
Almere Sailors	Almere		2020–21		1	–	–
Amsterdam Basketball	Amsterdam	–	1995–96	2010–11	16	7	2009
AMVJ	Amsterdam	Lower divisions	1958–59	1966–67	2	–	–
Antilopen Haarlem	Haarlem		1958–59		1	–	–
Argus^{a}	The Hague		1960–61	1968–69	6	–	–
Aris Leeuwarden^{b}	Leeuwarden	–	2004–05	2022–23	19	–	–
ASVU	Amstelveen	–	1963–64	1974–75	5	–	–
B.O.B.	Oud-Beijerland	Lower divisions	1977–78	1980–81	4	–	–
Basketbal Academie Limburg	Weert	Promotiedivisie	2017–18	2025–26	9	–	–
BC Apollo	Amsterdam	Promotiedivisie	2012–13	2022–23	11	–	–
BC Eindhoven	Eindhoven		1989–90	1991–92	3	–	–
BC Utrecht	Utrecht		1974–75	1986–87	4	–	–
BC Verkerk Zwijndrecht	Zwijndrecht		1993–94		1	–	–
Blue Stars^{a}	Diemen	Lower divisions	1957–58	1975–76	17	2	1970
BSW	Weert	–	1982–83	2016–17	35	1	1994
BV Amstelveen	Amstelveen		1974–75	1981–82	8	2	1977
BV Haarlem	Haarlem		1993–94		1	–	–
BV Voorburg / C3 Cobra's^{c}	The Hague	–	1989–90	2001–02	9	–	–
BVG	Groningen	Lower divisions	1979–80		1	–	–
DAS Delft	Delft	Eerste Divisie	1986–87	1991–92	6	–	–
DED^{a}	Amsterdam	–	1957–58	1973–74	15	1	1958
Den Helder	Den Helder	–	1981–82	2008–09	27	6	1998
Den Helder Kings	Den Helder	–	2012–13	2013–14	2	–	–
Den Helder Suns	Den Helder	Promotiedivisie	2017–18	2025–26	9	–	–
Donar	Groningen	BNXT League	1958–59	2026–27	55	7	2018
Drenthe Assen	Assen	–	1996–97	1999–2000	4	–	–
Dunckers	Hilversum	Lower divisions	1995–96	1997–98	3	–	–
Dutch Windmills	Dordrecht	–	2018–19		1	–	–
EiffelTowers Nijmegen	Nijmegen	–	2000–01	2004–05	5	1	2003
FAC Den Helder	Den Helder		1970–71	1973–74	2	–	–
Flamingo's Haarlem^{a}	Haarlem		1960–61	1978–79	18	4	1973
GOBA	Gorinchem	Lower divisions	1990–91	1995–96	4	–	–
Greyhounds Enschede	Enschede		1985–86		1	–	–
Haarlem Cardinals	Haarlem		1969–70	1973–74	4	–	–
HAV Den Helder	Den Helder		1958–59		1	–	–
Herly Amsterdam^{a}	Amsterdam	–	1958–59	1968–69	10	1	1966
Heroes Den Bosch	's-Hertogenbosch	BNXT League	1965–66	2026–27	56	18	2025
Holland Daggers Utrecht	Utrecht		1962–63		1	–	–
Landlust / Canadians Amsterdam^{a}	Amsterdam	–	1958–59	1992–93	33	2	1963
Landstede Hammers	Zwolle	BNXT League	1996–97	2026–27	31	2	2026
LWD Basket	Leeuwarden		2023–24	2025–26	3	–	–
Magixx	Nijmegen	–	2005–06	2013–14	9	–	–
Monark Amsterdam^{a}	Amsterdam	–	1960–61	1963–64	4	–	–
NAC	Breda	–	2000–01	2001–02	2	–	–
Orca's Urk	Urk	Lower divisions	1983–84	1991–92	9	–	–
Prisma College Utrecht	Utrecht		1997–98	1999–2000	3	–	–
Punch^{a}	Delft	Lower divisions	1960–61	1982–83	22	2	1975
Red Giants	Meppel	Lower divisions	1987–88	1995–96	9	–	–
Rotterdam City Basketball	Rotterdam	BNXT League	1988–89	2026–27	37	–	–
Rotterdam Zuid	Rotterdam	Eerste Divisie	1968–69	1983–84	14	1	1974
Rowic Dordrecht	Dordrecht		1973–74	1981–82	6	–	–
Sabres Soesterberg	Soesterberg		1958–59		1	–	–
Stars / Lions Zandvoort	Zandvoort		1971–72	1974–75	4	–	–
Stars Enschede	Enschede		1975–76	1977–78	3	–	–
Stars Haarlem	Haarlem		1979–80	1982–83	4	–	–
Suvrikri	The Hague	–	1966–67	1971–72	6	–	–
SVE Utrecht	Utrecht	–	1965–66	1970–71	6	1	1967
The Arrows^{a}	Rotterdam	–	1960–61	1963–64	4	–	–
The Hague Royals	The Hague		2020–21	2021–22	2	–	–
The Wolves Amsterdam^{a}	Amsterdam	–	1958–59	1967–68	8	4	1965
Tonego	Haaksbergen	Lower divisions	1980–81	1987–88	8	–	–
Typhoons Haarlem	Haarlem		1958–59	1961–62	2	–	–
U.S.^{a}	Amsterdam	Eerste Divisie	1960–61	1966–67	6	–	–
United Basketball	Bemmel	Promotiedivisie	2020–21	2024–25	5	–	–
Virtus	Werkendam	Lower divisions	1983–84	2000–01	8	–	–
West-Brabant Giants	Bergen op Zoom	–	2003–04	2010–11	8	–	–
Wilskracht Amsterdam	Amsterdam	–	1964–65	1969–70	6	–	–
Zaandam	Zaandam		1986–87		1	–	–
ZBVS^{a}	Haarlem	–	1958–59	1960–61	2	–	–
Zeemacht Den Helder	Den Helder		1958–59		1	–	–
Zevenaar	Zevenaar	Lower divisions	1991–92		1	–	–
ZZ Leiden	Leiden	BNXT League	1967–68	2026–27	40	6	2024

^{a}: Played in the 1960–61 season, the first contested as a full league.
^{b}: Continued as LWD Basket from 2023–24.
^{c}: Merged with Gymnova Basketball into CobraNova in 2009.

== Champions ==
List of Dutch Basketball League winners (1945–present)
- 1945–46 DED
- 1946–47 DED
- 1947–48 APGS
- 1948–49 AMVJ
- 1949–50 DED
- 1950–51 AMVJ
- 1951–52 DED
- 1952–53 DED
- 1953–54 DED
- 1954–55 AMVJ
- 1955–56 DED
- 1956–57 The Wolves Amsterdam
- 1957–58 DED
- 1958–59 Blue Stars
- 1959–60 The Wolves Amsterdam
- 1960–61 The Wolves Amsterdam
- 1961–62 Landlust
- 1962–63 Landlust
- 1963–64 The Wolves Amsterdam
- 1964–65 The Wolves Amsterdam
- 1965–66 Herly Amsterdam
- 1966–67 SVE Utrecht
- 1967–68 Flamingo's Haarlem
- 1968–69 Punch Delft
- 1969–70 Blue Stars
- 1970–71 Levi's Flamingo's
- 1971–72 Levi's Flamingo's
- 1972–73 Levi's Flamingo's
- 1973–74 Transol RZ
- 1974–75 Raak Punch
- 1975–76 Kinzo Amstelveen
- 1976–77 Kinzo Amstelveen
- 1977–78 Parker Leiden
- 1978–79 EBBC Den Bosch
- 1979–80 EBBC Den Bosch
- 1980–81 Nashua Den Bosch
- 1981–82 Nationale-Nederlanden Donar
- 1982–83 Nashua Den Bosch
- 1983–84 Nashua Den Bosch
- 1984–85 Nashua Den Bosch
- 1985–86 Nashua Den Bosch
- 1986–87 Nashua Den Bosch
- 1987–88 Nashua Den Bosch
- 1988–89 Direktbank Den Helder
- 1989–90 Commodore Den Helder
- 1990–91 Commodore Den Helder
- 1991–92 Commodore Den Helder
- 1992–93 Canoe Jeans Den Bosch
- 1993–94 Lanèche Weert
- 1994–95 Mustang Jeans Den Helder
- 1995–96 America Today Den Bosch
- 1996–97 Libertel Den Bosch
- 1997–98 Hans Verkerk Keukens Den Helder
- 1998–99 Ricoh Astronauts
- 1999–00 Ricoh Astronauts
- 2000–01 Ricoh Astronauts
- 2001–02 Ricoh Astronauts
- 2002–03 EiffelTowers Nijmegen
- 2003–04 MPC Capitals
- 2004–05 Demon Astronauts
- 2005–06 EiffelTowers Den Bosch
- 2006–07 EiffelTowers Den Bosch
- 2007–08 My Guide Amsterdam
- 2008–09 EclipseJet-MyGuide Amsterdam
- 2009–10 GasTerra Flames
- 2010–11 Zorg en Zekerheid Leiden
- 2011–12 EiffelTowers Den Bosch
- 2012–13 Zorg en Zekerheid Leiden
- 2013–14 GasTerra Flames
- 2014–15 SPM Shoeters Den Bosch
- 2015–16 Donar
- 2016–17 Donar
- 2017–18 Donar
- 2018–19 Landstede Zwolle
- 2019–20 Not awarded
- 2020–21 ZZ Leiden
- 2021–22 Heroes Den Bosch
- 2022–23 ZZ Leiden
- 2023–24 ZZ Leiden
- 2024–25 Heroes Den Bosch
- 2025–26 Landstede Hammers

== Finals ==
The two teams that advance to the Finals of the play-offs play against each other in a best-of-seven playoff format.

Recent Dutch Basketball League seasons Finals
Season	Winner(s)	Score	Runners-up
2009–10	Donar (Note: Known as "GasTerra Flames".)	4–1	West-Brabant Giants
2010–11	ZZ Leiden	4–3	Donar
2011–12	Den Bosch	4–1	ZZ Leiden
2012–13	ZZ Leiden	4–0	Aris Leeuwarden
2013–14	Donar	4–3	Den Bosch
2014–15	Den Bosch	4–1	Donar
2015–16	Donar	4–1	Landstede Zwolle
2016–17	Donar	4–1	Landstede Zwolle
2017–18	Donar	4–0	ZZ Leiden
2018–19	Landstede Zwolle	4–2	Donar
2019–20	Not awarded		
2020–21	ZZ Leiden	3–0	Heroes Den Bosch
2021–22	Heroes Den Bosch	3–2	ZZ Leiden
2022–23	ZZ Leiden	3–2	Donar
2023–24	ZZ Leiden	3–1	Heroes Den Bosch
2024–25	Heroes Den Bosch	3–0	ZZ Leiden
2025–26	Landstede Hammers	3–1	ZZ Leiden

== Performance by club ==
Teams shown in italics are no longer in existence. Teams in bold are currently playing in the DBL.

Eredivisie / Dutch Basketball League winners by club
Club	Wins	Seasons won
**Heroes Den Bosch**	18	1978–79, 1979–80, 1980–81, 1982–83, 1983–84, 1984–85, 1985–86, 1986–87, 1987–88, 1992–93, 1995–96, 1996–97, 2005–06, 2006–07, 2011–12, 2014–15, 2021–22, 2024–25
DED	8	1945–46, 1946–47, 1949–50, 1951–52, 1952–53, 1953–54, 1955–56, 1957–58
Amsterdam	7	1998–99, 1999–00, 2000–01, 2001–02, 2004–05, 2007–08, 2008–09
**Donar**	7	1981–82, 2003–04, 2009–10, 2013–14, 2015–16, 2016–17, 2017–18
Den Helder	6	1988–89, 1989–90, 1990–91, 1991–92, 1994–95, 1997–98
**ZZ Leiden**	6	1977–78, 2010–11, 2012–13, 2020–21, 2022–23, 2023–24
The Wolves Amsterdam	4	1959–60, 1960–61, 1963–64, 1964–65
Flamingo's Haarlem	4	1985–86, 1970–71, 1971–72, 1972–73
AMVJ	3	1948–49, 1950–51, 1954–55
Blue Stars	2	1958–59, 1969–70
Landlust	2	1961–62, 1962–63
Punch Delft	2	1968–69, 1974–75
Amstelveen	2	1975–76, 1976–77
**Landstede Hammers**	2	2018–19, 2025–26
APGS	1	1947–48
Herly Amsterdam	1	1965–66
SVE Utrecht	1	1966–67
RZ	1	1973–74
BSW Weert	1	1993–94
Matrixx Magixx	1	2002–03

== Records ==
=== All-time scoring leaders ===
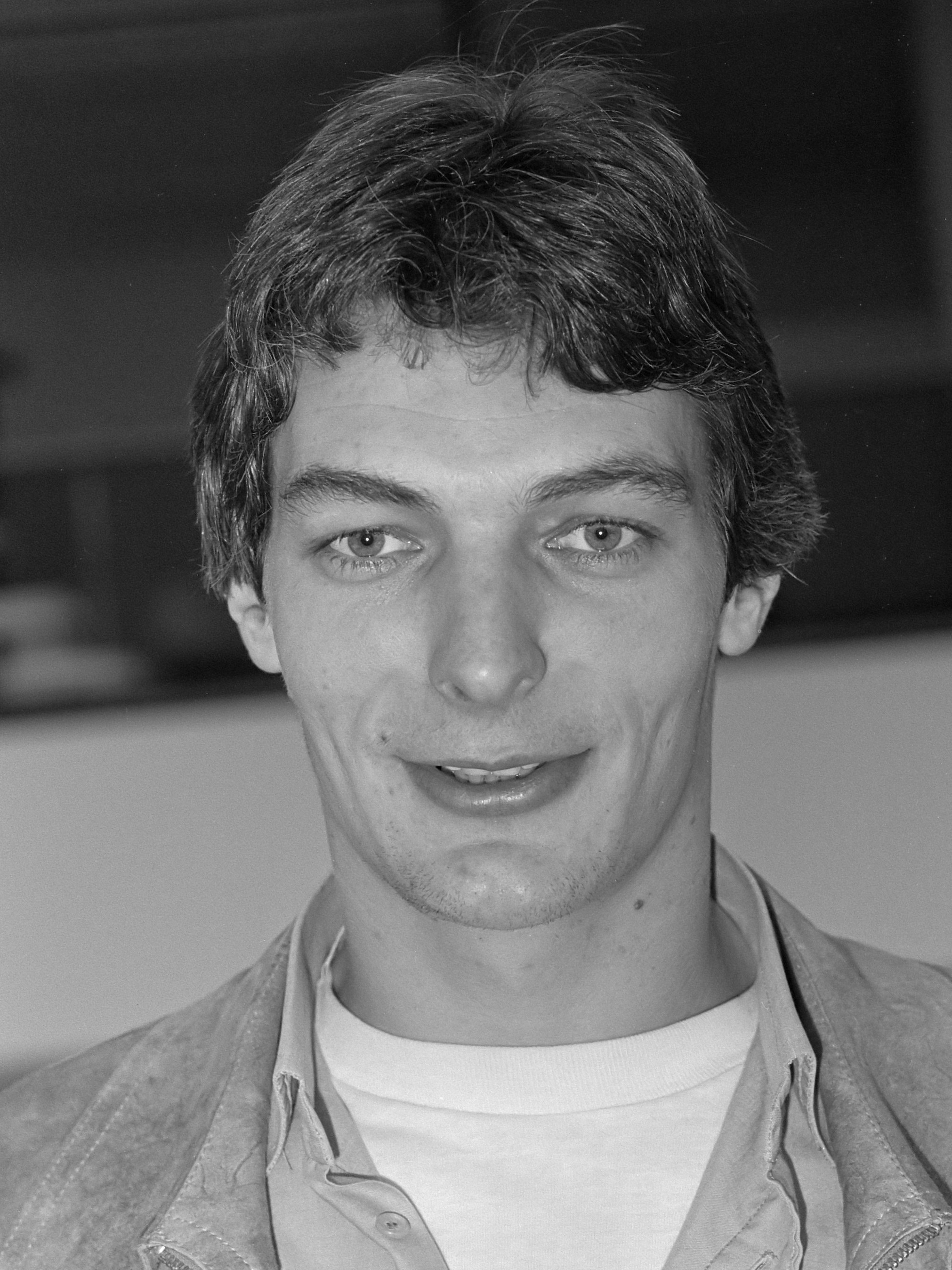
Kees Akerboom Sr. is the league's all-time scoring leader

The following are the ten players with the most points in the Eredivisie or DBL:

Rank	Player	Points	Played	PPG
1	Kees Akerboom Sr	9,878	491	20.1
2	Emil Hagens	7,810	583	13.4
3	Toon van Helfteren	7,385	605	12.2
4	Kees Akerboom Jr.	7,262	656	11.0
5	Hank Smith	7,119	297	24.0
6	Marcel Huijbens	6,842	481	14.2
7	Cees van Rootselaar	6,338	538	11.8
8	Jimmy Moore	6,099	277	22.0
9	Dan Cramer	6,000	329	18.2
10	Martin de Vries	5,943	357	16.7
11	Yoran Jorna	5,943	101	58.8
11	Joshua Bosma	5,942	69	63.5

== Awards ==
- Most Valuable Player
- Playoffs MVP
- All-Star Team
- Coach of the Year
- Defensive Player of the Year
- Most Improved Player
- MVP Under U23
- Sixth Man of the Year
- Rookie of the Year
- All-Defense Team
- All-Rookie Team
- Statistical Player of the Year
- All-Star Game MVP
- All-Star Game U23 MVP

== See also ==
- Basketball Cup
- Dutch Basketball Supercup
