= 2020–21 Dutch Basketball League =

Dutch Basketball League
- Season: 2020–21
- Dates: 3 October 2020 – 27 May 2021
- Teams: 12

Regular season
- Season MVP: (Netherlands) Emmanuel Nzekwesi (Leiden)

Finals
- Champions: ZZ Leiden; 4th title
- Runners-up: Heroes Den Bosch
- Playoffs MVP: (Netherlands) Worthy de Jong

Statistical leaders
Points	(Netherlands) Emmanuel Nzekwesi	21.7
Rebounds	(United States) Quatarrius Wilson	10.3
Assists	(United States) Austin Luke	9.7

Records
- Average attendance: 0 (all games played behind closed doors)

The 2020–21 Dutch Basketball League (DBL) was the 61st season of the Dutch Basketball League, the highest professional basketball league in the Netherlands. The season started on 3 October 2020 and ended on 27 May 2021.

It was the first season after the 2019–20 season was ended prematurely due to the COVID-19 pandemic. The league expanded to 12 teams with the addition of Yoast United, Almere Sailors and The Hague Royals. This marked the highest number of teams since the 2007–08 season. ZZ Leiden won its fourth national title after defeating Heroes Den Bosch in the Finals.

On 15 October 2020, the season was suspended for at least four weeks due to government regulations regarding the pandemic. On 19 December 2020, it was announced the competition would restart in January 2021 with a new format.

== Teams ==
After falling sponsorship revenue due to the COVID-19 pandemic, the DBL lowered the minimum budget for teams from €300,000 to €150,000 .

On 1 May 2020, Apollo Amsterdam announced it will not play in the DBL season because of uncertainty due to the pandemic. The DBL announced the remaining eight teams will return for the 2020–21 season. On 5 August, it was announced Basketball Community Gelderland has obtained a licence. On 20 August, it was announced Apollo Amsterdam has obtained a license. On 27 August, the DBL announced the entrance of The Hague Royals and Almere Sailors. BC Gelderland later revealed Yoast United as their new club name.

=== Stadiums and locations ===
Location of teams in the 2020–21 Dutch Basketball League

Note: Table lists in alphabetical order.

Club	Location	Venue	Capacity
Almere Sailors	Almere	Topsportcentrum Almere	3,000
Apollo Amsterdam	Amsterdam	Apollohal	1,500
Aris Leeuwarden	Leeuwarden	Kalverdijkje	1,700
BAL	Weert	Sporthal Boshoven	1,000
Den Helder Suns	Den Helder	Sporthal Sportlaan	1,000
Donar	Groningen	MartiniPlaza	4,350
Feyenoord	Rotterdam	Topsportcentrum Rotterdam	2,500
Heroes Den Bosch	's-Hertogenbosch	Maaspoort	2,800
Landstede Hammers	Zwolle	Landstede Sportcentrum	1,200
The Hague Royals	The Hague	Sportcampus Zuiderpark	3,500
Yoast United	Bemmel	De Schaapskooi	650
ZZ Leiden	Leiden	Vijf Meihal	2,000

=== Sponsored club names ===
As is common practice in European basketball, the following clubs carried the name of their sponsor this season:

Club	Sponsored name	Until
Feyenoord	Zeeuw & Zeeuw Feyenoord	2021
Yoast United	Yoast United	2023

=== Personnel and kits ===
Team	Manager	Captain	Kit manufacturer	Main sponsor
Almere Sailors	(Netherlands) Gregory Tjin-A-Koeng (interim)	(Netherlands) Mike Osepa	Erreà	Flevo Makelaardij
Apollo Amsterdam	(Netherlands) Erwin van der Hart	(Netherlands) Floris Versteeg	Nike	Paul Meijering Steel
Aris Leeuwarden	(Belgium) Ferried Naciri	(Netherlands) Craig Osaikhwuwuomwan	Jako	Friezon
BAL	(Serbia) Radenko Varagić	(Netherlands) Roel van Overbeek	Spalding	Enerparking
Den Helder Suns	(Netherlands) Peter van Noord	(Netherlands) Boyd van der Vuurst de Vries	Burned	–
Donar	(United States) Pete Miller (interim)	(Netherlands) Thomas Koenis	Macron	Amysoft
Feyenoord	(Netherlands) Toon van Helfteren	(Netherlands) Jeroen van der List	Adidas	Zeeuw & Zeeuw
Heroes Den Bosch	(Belgium) Jean-Marc Jaumin	(Netherlands) Stefan Wessels	Macron	Data City
Landstede Hammers	(Netherlands) Herman van den Belt	(United Kingdom) Nigel van Oostrum	Acerbis	Landstede
The Hague Royals	(Netherlands) Bert Samson	(Democratic Republic of the Congo) Eric Kibi	Burned	
Yoast United	(United States) Matthew Otten	(Netherlands) Matthew van Tongeren	Jako	Yoast SEO
ZZ Leiden	(Netherlands) Geert Hammink	(Netherlands) Marijn Ververs	Peak	Zorg en Zekerheid

=== Managerial changes ===
Team	Outgoing manager	Manner of departure	Date of vacancy	Position in table	Incoming manager	Date of appointment
ZZ Leiden	(Netherlands) Rolf Franke	End of contract	30 March 2020	Pre-season	(Netherlands) Geert Hammink	17 May 2020
Donar	(Netherlands) Erik Braal	End of contract	14 April 2020	Pre-season	(Croatia) Ivan Rudež	17 April 2020
Apollo Amsterdam	(Netherlands) Patrick Faijdherbe	End of contract	31 March 2020	Pre-season	(Croatia) Laki Lakner	1 May 2020
Yoast United	None			Pre-season	(United States) Matthew Otten	9 August 2020
The Hague Royals	None			Pre-season	(Netherlands) Bert Samson	20 June 2020
Almere Sailors	None			Pre-season	(Netherlands) Eric Kropf	13 August 2020
Apollo Amsterdam	(Croatia) Laki Lakner	Resigned	24 January 2021	11th (0–3)	(Netherlands) Erwin van der Hart	27 January 2021
Almere Sailors	(Netherlands) Eric Kropf	Fired	10 March 2021	12th (1–9)	(Netherlands) Gregory Tjin-A-Koeng	10 March 2021
Donar	(Croatia) Ivan Rudež	Fired	12 April 2021	3rd	(United States) Pete Miller	12 April 2021

== Regular season ==
=== Table ===
Pos	Team	Pld	W	L	PF	PA	PD	Pts	Qualification
1	ZZ Leiden	11	9	2	1022	838	+184	18	Advance to Elite A
2	Donar	11	9	2	924	736	+188	18	Advance to Elite A
3	Landstede Hammers	11	9	2	956	783	+173	18	Advance to Elite A
4	Heroes Den Bosch	11	8	3	951	836	+115	16	Advance to Elite A
5	Den Helder Suns	11	7	4	939	866	+73	14	Advance to Elite A
6	Feyenoord	11	7	4	890	760	+130	14	Advance to Elite A
7	Yoast United	11	6	5	898	876	+22	12	Advance to Elite B
8	BAL	11	5	6	854	886	−32	10	Advance to Elite B
9	Apollo Amsterdam	11	2	9	777	941	−164	4	Advance to Elite B
10	Aris Leeuwarden	11	2	9	709	852	−143	4	Advance to Elite B
11	The Hague Royals	11	1	10	663	912	−249	2	Advance to Elite B
12	Almere Sailors	11	1	10	755	1052	−297	2	Advance to Elite B

Source: DBL

=== Results ===
Home \ Away	ALM	AMS	ARI	BAL	DON	DHE	FEY	HDB	LAN	THR	YOA	ZZL
Almere Sailors	—	74–67*		64–81	48–120	84–98	53–84				64–101	
Apollo Amsterdam		—		70–81		87–97		67–95	77–105			76–103
Aris Leeuwarden	78–69	60–63	—		58–89			72–74			60–89	
BAL			81–58	—	55–96			88–89		92–65	75–86	
Donar		76–55			—	84–78	67–85	87–70	82–55			
Den Helder Suns			78–60	90–74		—	85–78	94–86	71–81			85–93
Zeeuw & Zeeuw Feyenoord		90–54	82–56	87–88			—		83–82	68–46		84–87
Heroes Den Bosch	119–74						73–71	—		92–46	94–77	88–87
Landstede Hammers	95–68		86–58	85–70				73–71	—	97–47		
The Hague Royals	85–78	71–80	66–86		53–67	52–89				—	68–73	
Yoast United		89–81			81–89	87–74	69–78		74–106		—	72–87
ZZ Leiden	124–79		75–63	96–69	98–67				82–91	90–64		—

Source: DBL
Legend: Blue = home team win; Red = away team win.

== Elite A ==
=== Table and Results ===
Teams carry the results from the regular season with them and play each other twice. All six teams are already qualified for the play-offs.

Pos	Team	Pld	W	L	PF	PA	PD	Pts	Qualification	ZZL	HDB	DON	LAN	FEY	DHE
1	ZZ Leiden	21	17	4	1916	1674	+242	34	Advance to Playoffs	—	78–86	96–91	96–93	84–78	90–81
2	Heroes Den Bosch	21	16	5	1935	1627	+308	32	Advance to Playoffs	106–90	—	68–81	99–76	83–79	107–58
3	Donar	21	14	7	1787	1547	+240	28	Advance to Playoffs	72–96	71–78	—	66–79	87–76	100–102
4	Landstede Hammers	21	13	8	1739	1599	+140	26	Advance to Playoffs	58–79	65–87	72–91	—	87–77	94–70
5	Feyenoord	21	10	11	1739	1608	+131	20	Advance to Playoffs	92–96	106–87	80–99	78–70	—	104–71
6	Den Helder Suns	21	9	12	1708	1828	−120	18	Advance to Playoffs	79–89	87–105	64–105	73–89	84–79	—

Source: DBL

== Elite B ==
=== Table and Results ===
Teams carry the results from the regular season with them and play each other twice. The two highest ranked teams qualify for the playoffs as seventh and eight seed.

Pos	Team	Pld	W	L	PF	PA	PD	Pts	Qualification	YOA	BAL	AMS	THR	ARI	ALM
1	Yoast United	21	16	5	1758	1564	+194	32	Advance to Playoffs	—	86–79	81–66	95–60	74–56	96–87
2	BAL	21	12	9	1682	1586	+96	24	Advance to Playoffs	80–82	—	90–70	75–49	91–69	96–58
3	Apollo Amsterdam	21	6	15	1522	1701	−179	12		71–83	59–64	—	83–79	82–78	77–80
4	The Hague Royals	21	6	15	1375	1649	−274	12		63–74	77–76	73–69	—	72–49	81–82
5	Aris Leeuwarden	21	4	17	1386	1629	−243	8		73–100	57–72	58–75	61–63	—	90–72
6	Almere Sailors	21	3	18	1503	1960	−457	6		53–89	93–105	74–93	73–95	76–86	—

Source: DBL

== Playoffs ==
The format of the playoffs was changed due to the compressed schedule. Quarterfinals were played as two-legged series, the semifinals as a best-of-three series and the finals as a best-of-five series.

=== Bracket ===
Quarterfinals
1 ZZ Leiden	183
8 BAL	148
4 Landstede Hammers	180
5 Feyenoord	158
2 Heroes Den Bosch	174
7 Yoast United	161
3 Donar	188
6 Den Helder Suns	158

Semifinals
1 ZZ Leiden	2
4 Landstede Hammers	1
2 Heroes Den Bosch	2
3 Donar	1

Finals
1 ZZ Leiden	3
2 Heroes Den Bosch	0

=== Quarterfinals ===
The quarterfinals were played in a two-legged format and were played on 8 May and 11 May 2021.

Team 1	Agg.	Team 2	1st leg	2nd leg
ZZ Leiden	183–148	BAL	86–77	97–71
Donar	188–154	Den Helder Suns	83–75	105–79
Heroes Den Bosch	174–161	Yoast United	89–91	85–70
Landstede Hammers	180–158	Feyenoord	97–76	83–82

=== Semifinals ===
The semifinals were played in a best of three series and were played on 15 May, 18 May and 20 May.

Team 1	Series	Team 2	Game 1	Game 2	Game 3
ZZ Leiden	2–1	Landstede Hammers	97–87	85–90	91–74
Heroes Den Bosch	2–1	Donar	97–76	71–79	82–74

=== Finals ===
ZZ Leiden reached the finals for the first time since 3 years, Heroes Den Bosch for the first time since 6 years. It is the sixth time the teams met each other in the finals, the last time being in 2012.

Team 1	Series	Team 2	Game 1	Game 2	Game 3	Game 4	Game 5
ZZ Leiden	3–0	Heroes Den Bosch	112–87	89–82	90–74		

== Statistics ==
=== Individual statistic leaders ===
Category	Player	Team(s)	Statistic
Points per game	(Netherlands) Emmanuel Nzekwesi	ZZ Leiden	20.3
Rebounds per game	(United States) Quatarrius Wilson	BAL	10.1
Assists per game	(United States) Austin Luke	Yoast United	9.3
Steals per game	(United States) Bolden Brace	Den Helder Suns	2.6
Blocks per game	(Netherlands) Bart Bijnsdorp	The Hague Royals	1.4
Turnovers per game	(Lithuania) Deividas Kumelis	The Hague Royals	4.8
Minutes per game	(United States) Juan Davis	Feyenoord	33.3
FG%	(Colombia) Andrés Ibargüen	Yoast United	69.1%

=== Individual game highs ===
Category	Player	Team	Statistic
Points	(United States) Austin Luke	Yoast United	43
Rebounds	(United States) Quatarrius Wilson (2×)	BAL	18
Rebounds	(Democratic Republic of the Congo) Eric Kibi	The Hague Royals	18
Assists	(Lithuania) Deividas Kumelis	The Hague Royals	16
Steals	(Lithuania) Arūnas Mikalauskas	Feyenoord	8
Blocks	Four players	Four player	4
Three pointers	(United States) Austin Luke	Yoast United	9

== Final standings ==
BAL, winners of the DBL Cup, refused to apply for the FIBA Europe Cup.

Pos	Team	Pld	W	L	Qualification
1	ZZ Leiden (C)	29	24	5	Qualification to Champions League qualifying rounds
2	Heroes Den Bosch	29	19	10	Qualification to FIBA Europe Cup
3	Donar	26	17	9	Qualification to FIBA Europe Cup qualifying rounds
4	Landstede Hammers	26	16	10	
5	Feyenoord	23	10	13	
6	Den Helder Suns	23	9	14	
7	Yoast United	23	17	6	
8	BAL (W)	23	12	11	
9	Apollo Amsterdam	21	6	15	
10	The Hague Royals	21	6	15	
11	Aris Leeuwarden	21	4	17	
12	Almere Sailors	21	3	18	

Source: DBL
(C) Champions; (W) 2021 DBL Cup winners

== Dutch clubs in European competitions ==
Team	Competition	Progress
Donar	Champions League	First qualifying round
Donar	FIBA Europe Cup	Regular season
Heroes Den Bosch	FIBA Europe Cup	Regular season
