= 2020–21 Almere Sailors season =

Almere Sailors
2020–21 season
- Head coach: Eric Kropf (September–March); Gregory Tjin-A-Koeng (March–May)
- Arena: Topsportcentrum
- Dutch Basketball League: 12th place
- Basketball Cup: First Round
Home	Away

The 2020–21 Almere Sailors season was the first season in the existence of the club. The club plays in the Dutch Basketball League (DBL) and Basketball Cup. The season started under experienced head coach Eric Kropf, who was fired in March 2021. Gregory Tjin-A-Koeng replaced him as interim head coach. The Sailors finished the season in the 12th and last place, with three wins recorded.

== Roster ==
Almere Sailors roster
Players
Coaches

Pos.	No.	Nat.	Name	Ht.	Age
PG	4	(Netherlands)	van de Weijenber, Brian	1.83 m (6 ft 0 in)	28 – 24 December 1996
G	5	(Netherlands)	Veltman, Dolf	1.87 m (6 ft 2 in)	24 – 12 December 2000
SG	6	(United States)	Lombardi, Dante	1.83 m (6 ft 0 in)	29 – 27 February 1996
SG	7	(Netherlands)	Richmond, Edwin	1.84 m (6 ft 0 in)	28 – 19 August 1996
G	8	(Netherlands)	Osepa, Mike (C)	1.91 m (6 ft 3 in)	34 – 7 March 1991
F	9	(Netherlands)	Kayhan, Job	2.02 m (6 ft 8 in)	24 – 23 December 2000
SG	11	(Netherlands)	Hoexum, Yoeri	1.88 m (6 ft 2 in)	25 – 12 May 1999
F	12	(Netherlands)	Knepa, Marnexson	1.98 m (6 ft 6 in)	28 – 19 March 1996
C	13	(Netherlands)	Hersisia, Papito	2.00 m (6 ft 7 in)	34 – 12 October 1990
F	14	(Netherlands)	Olijfveld, Livadjo	1.97 m (6 ft 6 in)	25 – 28 February 2000
C	15	(United States)	Joyce, Eamonn	2.08 m (6 ft 10 in)	27 – 17 May 1997
G	16	(Netherlands)	Sage, Esebio	1.84 m (6 ft 0 in)	28 – 13 June 1996
F	18	(Netherlands)	Pot, Ruben	2.00 m (6 ft 7 in)	23 – 6 September 2001

Head coach

- (Netherlands) Eric Kropf

Assistant coach(es)

- (Netherlands) Timothy Donk
- (Netherlands) Gregory Tjin-A-Koeng

Legend

- (C) Team captain
- Injured

- Roster
Updated: 5 October 2020

Note: Flags indicate national team eligibility at FIBA-sanctioned events. Players may hold other non-FIBA nationalities not displayed.

== Transactions ==
=== In ===
No.	Pos.	Nat.	Name	Age	Moving from		Type	Ends	Date	Source
13	PF	(Netherlands)	Papito Hersisia	30	Killarney Scotts	(Republic of Ireland)	Free	Undisclosed	16 September 2020	
4	PG	(Netherlands)	Brian van de Weijenberg	23	Attacus	(Netherlands)	Free	Undisclosed	17 September 2020	
8	SF	(Netherlands)	Mike Osepa	29	Almere Pioneers	(Netherlands)	Free	Undisclosed	18 September 2020	
9	F	(Netherlands)	Job Kayhan	19	Almere Pioneers	(Netherlands)	Free	Undisclosed	25 September 2020	
7	SG	(Netherlands)	Edwin Richmond	24	Almere Pioneers	(Netherlands)	Free	Undisclosed	26 September 2020	
15	C	(United States)	Eamonn Joyce	24	Southern New Hampshire University	(United States)	Free	2021	2 February 2021	
11	SG	(Netherlands)	Yoeri Hoexum	22	Donar	(Netherlands)	Free	Undisclosed	1 February 2021	
