= 2021 DBL Cup =

Basketball tournament in the Netherlands

- Season: 2021
- Duration: 24 April – 2 May 2021
- Games played: 9
- Teams: 12

Finals
- Champions: BAL; 1st title
- Runners-up: Yoast United

The 2020–21 DBL Cup was the 53rd edition of the Netherlands' national basketball cup tournament. This season the format was changed due to the compressed playing schedule caused by the ongoing COVID-19 pandemic. Only teams from the Dutch Basketball League participated this year and all games are to be played in one week.

The season was one of the most surprising in Dutch basketball history, as seventh-seeded Yoast United and eight-seeded BAL reached the final. BAL won the final in the Landstede Sportcentrum to win its first-ever Cup title.

== Format ==
The four highest-ranked teams from the 2020–21 Dutch Basketball League regular season are automatically qualified for the quarterfinals. The teams 5-12 play in the eight-finals.

== Qualification and seeding ==
Pos	Team	Pld	W	L	PF	PA	PD	Pts	Qualification
1	ZZ Leiden	17	14	3	1573	1377	+196	28	Qualified for quarterfinals
2	Heroes Den Bosch	18	13	5	1565	1414	+151	26	Qualified for quarterfinals
3	Donar	18	12	6	1511	1307	+204	24	Qualified for quarterfinals
4	Landstede Hammers	18	12	6	1518	1344	+174	24	Qualified for quarterfinals
5	Den Helder Suns	17	9	8	1434	1422	+12	18	Qualified for first round
6	Feyenoord	18	9	9	1478	1351	+127	18	Qualified for first round
7	Yoast United	18	13	5	1493	1327	+166	26	Qualified for first round
8	BAL	17	9	8	1392	1335	+57	18	Qualified for first round
9	Apollo Amsterdam	17	5	12	1230	1407	−177	10	Qualified for first round
10	The Hague Royals	18	4	14	1190	1444	−254	8	Qualified for first round
11	Aris Leeuwarden	18	3	15	1182	1418	−236	6	Qualified for first round
12	Almere Sailors	18	3	15	1266	1685	−419	6	Qualified for first round

Source: DBL

== Bracket ==
First Round
24 April
Yoast United	87
Apollo Amsterdam	69
24 April
The Hague Royals	w.o.
Aris Leeuwarden
24 April
BAL	114
Almere Sailors	51
24 April
Den Helder Suns	77
Feyenoord	82

Quarter-finals
28 April
Yoast United	97
Donar	91
28 April
Landstede Hammers	89
The Hague Royals	58
28 April
BAL	90
ZZ Leiden	87
28 April
Feyenoord	91
Heroes Den Bosch	74

Semi-finals
30 April
Yoast United (OT)	110
Landstede Hammers	90
30 April
BAL	84
Feyenoord	79

Final
2 May
Yoast United	88
BAL	98

== First round ==
24 April 2021	BAL	114–51	Almere Sailors	Weert
20:00
	Pts: Masnic 23; Rebs: Nossek 7 Asts: Brathwaite 5	Report	Pts: Kayhan 9 Rebs: 3 players 4 Asts: Lombardi 3	Arena: Sporthal Boshoven; Attendance: 0

24 April 2021	The Hague Royals	20–0 (Note: Multiple members of the Aris Leeuwarden team were tested positive for COVID-19 and as a result the team did not have a big-enough roster to play.)	Aris Leeuwarden	The Hague
				Arena: Sportcampus Zuiderpark

24 April 2021	Yoast United	87–69	Apollo Amsterdam	Bemmel
16:00
	Pts: Luke 29; Rebs: Warner 13; Asts: Luke 8	Report	Pts: Versteeg 16; Rebs: De Randamie 9 Asts: Weijs	Arena: De Schaapskooi; Attendance: 0

24 April 2021	Den Helder Suns	77–82	Feyenoord	Den Helder
20:00
	Pts: Brace 22; Rebs: Brace 12; Asts: Brace 6	Report	Pts: Stolk 20; Rebs: Van der List 15; Asts: Bruining 10	Arena: Sporthal Sportlaan

== Quarterfinals ==
26 April 2021	Feyenoord	91–74	Heroes Den Bosch	Rotterdam
20:00
	Pts: Van der List 19; Rebs: Davis 13; Asts: Lehtoranta 7	Report	Pts: Williams 20; Rebs: Williams, Mayfield 6 Asts: Payne 5	Arena: Topsportcentrum Rotterdam

26 April 2021	Landstede Hammers	89–58	The Hague Royals	Zwolle
19:30
	Pts: Dunn 22; Rebs: Rados 8 Asts: Locke & Van Oostrum 5	Report	Pts: Barrie 15; Rebs: Kibi 8 Asts: Kumelis 8	Arena: Topsportcentrum Rotterdam

26 April 2021	BAL	90–87	ZZ Leiden	Weert
19:30
	Pts: Wilson 29; Rebs: Wilson 10; Asts: Wilson 5	Report	Pts: Nzekwesi 20; Rebs: Van Bree & De Jong 5 Asts: 4 players 3	Arena: Sporthal Boshoven

26 April 2021	Yoast United	97–91	Donar	Bemmel
20:00
	Pts: Speelman 23; Rebs: Speelman & Ibargüen 8 Asts: Luke 11	Report	Pts: Ogungbemi-Jackson 21; Rebs: Koenis 8 Asts: Rudez 7	Arena: De Schaapskooi

== Semifinals ==
26 April 2021 Semifinal	BAL	84–79	Feyenoord	Weert
20:00	Scoring by quarter: 18–18, 19–21, 24–18, 23–22
	Pts: Jasinsky 19; Rebs: Nossek 10; Asts: Van Overbeek 5 PIR: Jasinsky 20	Report	Pts: Mikalauskas & Van der List 20; Rebs: Van der List 15; Asts: Kanda 7 PIR: Van der List 28	Arena: Sporthal Boshoven; Attendance: 0

26 April 2021 Semifinal	Yoast United	110–99OT	Landstede Hammers	Bemmel
20:00	Scoring by quarter: 24–19, 16–23, 28–19, 22–29, Overtime: 20–9
	Pts: Luke 52; Rebs: Ibargüen 13; Asts: Luke 5 PIR: Luke 53	Report	Pts: Dunn 31; Rebs: Rados 10; Asts: Joseph 4 PIR: Dunn 22	Arena: De Schaapskooi; Attendance: 0

== Final ==
2 May 2021	Yoast United	88–98	BAL	Zwolle
14:30	Scoring by quarter: 22–26, 21–23, 28–24, 17–25
NPO 1	Pts: Ibargüen 39; Rebs: Ibargüen 13; Asts: Luke 16; PIR: Ibargüen 47	Boxscore	Pts: Jasinsky 27; Rebs: Wilson 12; Asts: Van Overbeek 7 PIR: Jasinsky 27	Arena: Landstede Sportcentrum; Attendance: 0

== Winning roster ==
2020–21 BAL roster
Players
Coaches

Pos.	No.	Nat.	Name	Ht.
PG	2	(Netherlands)	van Overbeek, Roel (C)	1.88 m (6 ft 2 in)
SF	4	(Netherlands)	Brathwaite, Oshean	1.76 m (5 ft 9 in)
PG	5	(Netherlands)	Simic, Ivan	1.88 m (6 ft 2 in)
F/C	6	(United States)	Wilson, Quatarrius	2.03 m (6 ft 8 in)
SG	7	(Netherlands)	Hollanders, Sander	1.94 m (6 ft 4 in)
PF	10	(Germany)	Masnic, Neil	2.06 m (6 ft 9 in)
PF	12	(Netherlands)	Nossek, Wietze	2.02 m (6 ft 8 in)
C	13	(Netherlands)	Verhoeven, Odin	2.04 m (6 ft 8 in)
PF	15	(Netherlands)	Ackermans, Tom	1.98 m (6 ft 6 in)
SG	19	(Netherlands)	de Vries, Jef	1.89 m (6 ft 2 in)
SF	24	(United States)	Jasinsky, Trevor	2.01 m (6 ft 7 in)

Head coach

- (Serbia) Radenko Varagić

Assistant coach(es)

- (Netherlands) Chris van Dinten
- (Netherlands) Koen van Gerwen

Legend

- (C) Team captain
- (DP) Development player
- (I) Import player
- Injured

- Roster

== See also ==
- 2020–21 Dutch Basketball League
