= 2026–27 Donar (basketball club) season =

Dutch basketball club season

Donar
2026–27 season
- Chairman: Stefan Mladenovic
- Head coach: Jason Dourisseau (2nd season)
- Arena: MartiniPlaza

The 2026–27 Donar season was the 55th season in the existence of the club.

== Players ==
=== Squad information ===
Donar roster
Players
Coaches

Pos.	No.	Nat.	Name	Ht.	Age
SG	0	(United States)	Antoine, Bryan	1.96 m (6 ft 5 in)	26 – 26 April 2000
PF/C	1	(United States)	Adebayo, Dola	2.03 m (6 ft 8 in)	23 – 3 July 2003
G	2	(United States)	Godwin, Kevon	1.88 m (6 ft 2 in)	26 – 4 March 2000
C	4	(United States)	DeLoach, Jalen	2.08 m (6 ft 10 in)	24 – 2 April 2002
G	5	(Netherlands)	Uijtendaal, Siem	1.98 m (6 ft 6 in)	25 – 5 May 2001
PG	6	(Netherlands)	Brathwaite, Oshean	1.83 m (6 ft 0 in)	24 – 28 May 2002
PF	7	(Netherlands)	Bergsma, Brandon	2.05 m (6 ft 9 in)	25 – 25 September 2001
SG	9	(Netherlands)	Kobus, Joost	1.90 m (6 ft 3 in)	18 – 16 June 2008
G	11	(Netherlands)	Adetunji, Délé	1.91 m (6 ft 3 in)	23 – 5 October 2003
SG	12	(Netherlands)	Cnubben, Lasse	1.92 m (6 ft 4 in)	19 – 26 May 2007
G/F	15	(United States)	McCalister, Michael	1.96 m (6 ft 5 in)	24 – 1 November 2002
F	23	(Georgia (country))	Merkviladze, Aleksandre	2.04 m (6 ft 8 in)	24 – 11 March 2002

Head coach

- (Netherlands) Jason Dourisseau

Assistant coach(es)

- (Netherlands) Yannick Koerts

Legend

- (C) Team captain
- (DP) Development player
- (I) Import player
- Injured

- Roster
Updated: July 24, 2026

Note: Flags indicate national team eligibility at FIBA-sanctioned events. Players may hold other non-FIBA nationalities not displayed.

=== Transactions ===
==== In ====
No.	Pos.	Nat.	Name	Age	Moving from		Contract	Ends	Date	Source
0	SG	(United States)	Bryan Antoine	26	Den Helder Suns	(Netherlands)	2027	24 juni 2026		
1	PF/C	(United States)	Dola Adebayo	23	George Mason University	(United States)	2027	2 August 2026		
2	PG	(United States)	Kevon Godwin	23	Arantia Larochette	(Luxembourg)	2027	24 July 2026		
4	C	(United States)	Jalen DeLoach	24	KK Zivinice	(Bosnia and Herzegovina)	2027	21 July 2026		
5	G	(Netherlands)	Siem Uijtendaal	25	Den Helder Suns	(Netherlands)	2027	4 July 2026		
6	G	(Netherlands)	Oshean Brathwaite	24	Limburg United	(Belgium)	2028	12 July 2026		
7	PF	(Netherlands)	Brandon Bergsma	22	ZZ Leiden	(Netherlands)	2027	26 July 2026		
15	G/F	(United States)	Michael McCalister	23	Holdbæk Stenhus	(Denmark)	2027	4 August 2026		
23	F	(Georgia (country))	Aleksandre Merkviladze	24	Filou Oostende	(Belgium)	2027	24 August 2026		

1. In players: Players who signed after the beginning of the season

Jacob Crews was announced to be part of the team on July 21. However, only a week before the beginning of pre-season he left the team due to personal reasons.

=== Out ===
No.	Pos.	Nat.	Name	Age	Moving to		Type	Date	Source
33	C	(United States)	Damian Forrest	25	BC Kalev	(Estonia)	End of contract	31 July 2026	
1	PG	(United States)	Austin Luke	31	Dziki Warsaw	(Poland)	End of contract	4 August 2026	
21	G	(Netherlands)	Tim Hoeve	28	Basket Corato	(Italy)	End of contract	6 August 2026	
32	F	(Netherlands)	Kjeld Zuidema	25	ZZ Leiden	(Netherlands)	End of contract	16 July 2026	
2	P/C	(United States)	Carlton Linguard Jr.	25	Hong Kong Eastern	(Hong Kong)	End of contract	8 September 2026	
13	F	(Switzerland)	Kilian Martin	28	Spinelli Massagno	(Switzerland)	End of contract		
22	PF	(Netherlands)	Wietze Nossek	28	–		End of contract		
4	G	(United States)	Malik Miller	26	–		End of contract		
5	SF	(United States)	Evan Taylor	25	–		End of contract		

== Preseason ==
Further games were played behind closed doors with no result being publicized.

29 August 2026	Donar (Netherlands)	109–82	(Netherlands) Hot Pepper Heat	Wildervank
19:30	Scoring by quarter: 29-21, 28-25, 19-19, 33-17
	Pts: Antoine, 27; Rebs: DeLoach, 9 Asts: Braithwaite, 8		Pts: van der Schalie, 25; Rebs: van der Schalie, 10; Asts: Vankan, 5	Arena: Wildervankhal; Attendance: 500

5 September 2026	Donar (Netherlands)	86–89	(Belgium) Kangoeroes Mechelen	Emmen
19:00	Scoring by quarter: 22-23, 29-15, 14-24, 21-27
	Pts: Godwin, 22; Rebs: DeLoach, McCalister, 5 Asts: Godwin, 6		Pts: Klesmit, Willems, 19; Rebs: Willems, 14; Asts: Viskne, 7	Arena: Sporthal Angeslo

20 September 2026	Donar (Netherlands)	91–90	(Netherlands) Rotterdam City Basketball	Assen
15:00	Scoring by quarter: 28-27, 26-17, 24-19, 13-27
	Pts: Godwin, 26; Rebs: DeLoach, McCalister, 6 Asts: Braithwaite, 6		Pts: Ondaan, 22; Rebs: Gaines, 11; Asts: Williams, 7	Arena: Sporthal de Spreng

== Dutch Supercup ==
Donar qualified for the Dutch Supercup after winning the Dutch Basketball Cup the previous season. The supercup was lost to Landstede Hammers, the previous year Dutch champion, by 70-62. In the final, Merkviladze couldn't participate since he had not received his working permit yet.

12 September 2026	Landstede Hammers (Netherlands)	70–62	(Netherlands) Donar	Zwolle
16:00	Scoring by quarter: 16-20, 21-15, 16-14, 17-13
	Pts: Haskin, 15; Rebs: Haskin, 9 Asts: van Vliet, 5		Pts: Godwin, 21; Rebs: Bergsma, 10; Asts: Brathwaite, 5	Arena: Landstede Sportcentrum

== BNXT League ==
=== Regular season ===
2 October 2026 1	House of Talents Spurs Kortrijk (Belgium)	76–85	(Netherlands) Donar	Kortrijk
20:00	Scoring by quarter: 17–29, 14–25, 23–13, 22–18
	Pts: Johnson-Thomas, Adamu, 13; Rebs: 3 players, 6 Asts: Kaukiainen, 4	Boxscore	Pts: Antoine, 22; Rebs: DeLoach, Merkviladze, 9 Asts: Godwin, 7	Arena: Sportcampus Lange Munte; Attendance: 1428

6 October 2026 2	Donar (Netherlands)	81–78	(Belgium) AB InBev Leuven Bears	Groningen
19:30	Scoring by quarter: 11–13, 29–17, 22–23, 19–25
	Pts: Bergsma, 19; Rebs: Merkviladze, 9 Asts: Godwin, 8	Boxscore	Pts: Thomas, 27; Rebs: Thomas, 8 Asts: Cleveland, 3	Arena: Martiniplaza; Attendance: 2500

14 October 2026 3	Donar (Netherlands)	63–90	(Belgium) Val-Dieu Spirou Basket	Groningen
19:30	Scoring by quarter: 15–27, 11–28, 13–20, 20–15
	Pts: McCalister, 20; Rebs: Merkviladze, 6 Asts: Brathwaite, 3	Boxscore	Pts: Konieczny Jr., 23; Rebs: Andre, 9 Asts: Heath, 8	Arena: Martiniplaza; Attendance: 3100

25 October 2026 4	Partena Professional Okapi Aalst (Belgium)	114–90	(Netherlands) Donar	Aalst
15:00	Scoring by quarter: 31-24, 28-29, 30-12, 25-25
	Pts: Thomas, 26; Rebs: 3 players, 10; Asts: Van Den Eynde, 6	Boxscore	Pts: Merkviladze, Godwin, 19; Rebs: DeLoach, 6 Asts: Godwin, 6	Arena: Okapi Forum

31 October 2026 5	ZZ Leiden (Netherlands)	83–96	(Netherlands) Donar	Leiden
20:00	Scoring by quarter: 17-24, 22-19, 26-25, 18-28
	Pts: Huurman, 21; Rebs: Futrell, 10; Asts: Roel van Overbeek, 5	Boxscore	Pts: Merkviladze, 27; Rebs: DeLoach, 10; Asts: Uijtendaal, 5	Arena: Sportcomplex 1574; Attendance: 1678

8 November 2026 6	Donar (Netherlands)	73–96	(Belgium) HUBO Limburg United	Groningen
16:00	Scoring by quarter: 10-31, 26-23, 20-19, 17-23
	Pts: Godwin, 16; Rebs: DeLoach, Uijtendaal, 6 Asts: Godwin, 4	Boxscore	Pts: Shahid, 21; Rebs: Baumann, 8 Asts: Ververs	Arena: Martiniplaza; Attendance: 3300

15 November 2026 7	Rotterdam City Basketball (Netherlands)	70–83	(Netherlands) Donar	Rotterdam
14:00	Scoring by quarter: 24-24, 8-21, 22-22, 16-16
	Pts: Tomashek, 18; Rebs: Gaines, Ondaan 8 Asts: Williams, Gaines 4	Boxscore	Pts: Merkviladze, 30; Rebs: DeLoach, 8 Asts: Brathwaite, 4	Arena: Topsportcentrum Rotterdam; Attendance: 2000

4 December 2026 8	Brussels Basketball (Belgium)	vs.	(Netherlands) Donar	Brussels
20:30
				Arena: Piscine de Neder-Over-Hembeek

8 December 2026 9	Donar (Netherlands)	vs.	(Netherlands) Landstede Hammers	Groningen
19:30
				Arena: Martiniplaza

13 December 2026 10	Donar (Netherlands)	vs.	(Netherlands) Heroes Den Bosch	Groningen
18:30
				Arena: Martiniplaza

15 December 2026 11	Donar (Netherlands)	vs.	(Belgium) Kangoeroes Mechelen	Groningen
19:30
				Arena: Martiniplaza

9 January 2027 12	City X Mons (Belgium)	vs.	(Netherlands) Donar	Mons
20:30
				Arena: Mons.Arena

16 January 2027 13	Donar (Netherlands)	vs.	(Belgium) Coretec Oostende	Groningen
19:30
				Arena: Martiniplaza

22 January 2027 14	CB Liège (Belgium)	vs.	(Netherlands) Donar	Liège
20:30
				Arena: Pôle Ballons

26 January 2027 15	Donar (Netherlands)	vs.	(Belgium) House of Talents Spurs Kortrijk	Groningen
19:30
				Arena: Martiniplaza

31 January 2027 16	HUBO Limburg United (Belgium)	vs.	(Netherlands) Donar	Hasselt
15:00
				Arena: Sporthal Alverberg

6 February 2027 17	Donar (Netherlands)	vs.	(Netherlands) Rotterdam City Basketball	Groningen
19:30
				Arena: Martiniplaza

17 February 2027 18	AB InBev Leuven Bears (Belgium)	vs.	(Netherlands) Donar	Leuven
20:30
				Arena: Sportoase

26 February 2027 19	Donar (Netherlands)	vs.	(Belgium) Windrose Antwerp Giants	Groningen
19:30
				Arena: Martiniplaza

6 March 2027 20	Donar (Netherlands)	vs.	(Belgium) Brussels Basketball	Groningen
19:30
				Arena: Martiniplaza

14 March 2027 21	Landstede Hammers (Netherlands)	vs.	(Netherlands) Donar	Zwolle
14:00
				Arena: Landstede Sportcentrum

25 March 2027 22	Heroes Den Bosch (Netherlands)	vs.	(Netherlands) Donar	's-Hertogenbosch
20:00
				Arena: Maaspoort

4 April 2027 23	Donar (Netherlands)	vs.	(Belgium) City X Mons	Groningen
19:30
				Arena: Martiniplaza

11 April 2027 24	Kangoeroes Mechelen (Belgium)	vs.	(Netherlands) Donar	Mechelen
16:00
				Arena: De Nekker

18 April 2027 25	Donar (Netherlands)	vs.	(Belgium) CB Liège	Groningen
15:30
				Arena: Martiniplaza

24 April 2027 26	Donar (Netherlands)	vs.	(Belgium) Partena Professional Okapi Aalst	Groningen
19:30
				Arena: Martiniplaza

28 April 2027 27	Val-Dieu Spirou Basket (Belgium)	vs.	(Netherlands) Donar	Charleroi
20:30
				Arena: Spiroudome

1 May 2027 28	Coretec Oostende (Belgium)	vs.	(Netherlands) Donar	Oostende
20:30
				Arena: COREtec Dôme

8 May 2027 29	Donar (Netherlands)	vs.	(Netherlands) ZZ Leiden	Groningen
20:30
				Arena: Martiniplaza

== European North Basketball League ==
=== Regular season ===
Like the previous two years, Donar participated in the European North Basketball League. Due to last years cup championship, the club qualified for the FIBA Europe Cup but still enrolled for the ENBL due to the flexibility in playing schedule the ENBL allows and their problems with their playing venue Martiniplaza.

Donar was placed into group B.

24 September 2026 1	Anwil Włocławek (Poland)	97–81	(Netherlands) Donar	Włocławek
18:30	Scoring by quarter: 27–23, 19–15, 26–25, 25–18
	Pts: Hines Jr., 28; Rebs: Freeman, 12; Asts: Lecomte, 8	Boxscore	Pts: Merkviladze, 22; Rebs: Merkviladze, 7 Asts: Oshean, 5	Arena: Hala Mistrzów; Attendance: 2306

30 September 2026 2	TalTech (Estonia)	83–70	(Netherlands) Donar	Tallinn
18:30	Scoring by quarter: 20–19, 20–21, 23–14, 20–16
	Pts: Metsalu, 18; Rebs: Post, 7 Asts: Post, 7	Boxscore	Pts: Merkviladze, 18; Rebs: Merkviladze, 9 Asts: Oshean, 3	Arena: TalTech Sports Hall; Attendance: 611

27 October 2026 3	Donar (Netherlands)	90–71	(Romania) CSO Voluntari	Groningen
19:30	Scoring by quarter: 23-22, 20-13, 24-18, 23-18
	Pts: Godwin, 26; Rebs: Merkviladze, 9 Asts: Uijtendaal, 4	Boxscore	Pts: Sullivan, Durmo, 17; Rebs: Durmo, 11; Asts: Azor, 5	Arena: Martiniplaza; Attendance: 2100

3 November 2026 4	Alkar Sinj (Croatia)	80–92	(Netherlands) Donar	Sinj
	Scoring by quarter: 25-22, 15-28, 24-25, 16-17
	Pts: Brzović, 23; Rebs: Gaffney, 5 Asts: Burden Jr, 8	Boxscore	Pts: Godwin, Merkviladze, 17; Rebs: 3 players, 7 Asts: Godwin, 6	Attendance: 450

11 November 2026 5	Donar (Netherlands)	83–81	(Cyprus) TRIA EKA AEL	Groningen
19:30	Scoring by quarter: 22-16, 28-27, 14-21, 19-17
	Pts: Merkviladze, 21; Rebs: Merkviladze, 12; Asts: Godwin, 6	Boxscore	Pts: Bailey, 21; Rebs: Bailey, 8 Asts: Carry, 6	Arena: Martiniplaza; Attendance: 2200

6 January 2027 6	Fyllingen Lions (Norway)	vs.	(Netherlands) Donar	Bergen
19:00
				Arena: Haukelandshallen

19 January 2027 7	Donar (Netherlands)	vs.	(Bulgaria) Spartak Pleven	Groningen
19:30
				Arena: Martiniplaza

3 February 2027 8	Donar (Netherlands)	vs.	(Bosnia and Herzegovina) HKK Zrinjski 1992	Groningen
19:30
				Arena: Martiniplaza
