= Neil Masnic =

German-Bosnian basketball player (born 2000)

No. 10 – VfL AstroStars Bochum
- Position: Small forward / power forward
- League: ProA

Personal information
- Born: 10 May 2000 (age 26) Bielefeld, Germany
- Listed height: 206 cm (6 ft 9 in)
- Listed weight: 108 kg (238 lb)

Career information
- High school: Knox School (Saint James, New York)
- Playing career: 2019–present

Career history
- 2019–2020: EWE Baskets Juniors
- 2020–2024: BAL
- 2024–2025: Paderborn Baskets
- 2025–2026: Uni Baskets Münster
- 2026–present: VfL AstroStars Bochum

Career highlights
- Dutch Cup champion (2021)

Neil Masnic (born 10 May 2000) is a German-Bosnian basketball player for VfL AstroStars Bochum of the ProA.

== Professional career ==
In the 2019–20 season, Masnic played for EWE Baskets Juniors in the ProB.

On 15 June 2020, Masnic signed a 2-year contract with BAL in the Netherlands. On 2 May 2021, he won the 2021 DBL Cup with his team after beating Yoast United in the final.

On June 13, 2025, he signed with Uni Baskets Münster of the ProA.

On July 3, 2026, he signed with VfL AstroStars Bochum of the ProA.
