= Evan Taylor =

Evan Taylor may refer to:

- Evan Taylor (footballer)
- Evan Taylor (basketball)
