= Andrés Ibargüen =

Andrés Ibargüen may refer to:

- Andrés Ibargüen (footballer) (born 1992), Colombian football player
- Andrés Ibargüen (basketball) (born 1996), Colombian basketball player
