= 2026 Liga Sudamericana de Básquetbol =

29th season of the Liga Sudamericana de Básquetbol

2026 Liga Sudamericana de Baloncesto
- League: Liga Sudamericana de Baloncesto
- Season: 2026
- Duration: 2–25 October 2026 (group phase); November 2026 (Quarterfinals); 5–6 December 2026 (Final Four)
- Teams: 16 (from 7 countries)

The 2026 Liga Sudamericana de Básquetbol, or 2026 FIBA South American Basketball League, is the 29th season of the Liga Sudamericana de Básquetbol (LSB), the second tier of basketball in South America organised by FIBA Americas. The season began on 2 October and will end on 6 December 2026.

Ferro Carril Oeste were the defending champions, but they did not defend their title since they qualified for 2026–27 Basketball Champions League Americas.

== Team allocation ==
The list of teams was confirmed on 2 September 2025 by FIBA.

- 1st, 2nd, etc.: Position in national league
- WC: Wild card
Location of teams of the 2026 Liga Sudamericana de Baloncesto group stage.
Red: Group A; Green: Group B; Yellow: Group C; Blue: Group D.

(Argentina) Boca Juniors	(Brazil) Brasilia	(Chile) Colegio Los Leones	(Paraguay) Olimpia Kings
(Argentina) Regatas Corrientes	(Brazil) Corinthians	(Colombia) Paisas	(Paraguay) San José
(Argentina) Oberá TC	(Brazil) Flamengo	(Ecuador) CD Jorge Guzmán	(Uruguay) Nacional
(Argentina) Independiente	(Brazil) Mogi das Cruzes	(Ecuador) Importadora Alvarado	(Uruguay) Defensor Sporting

== Format ==
In the group phase there will be four groups of four teams. All team will play each other once, for a total of three games per team. The top two ranked teams will advance to the Quarterfinals. In the Quarterfinals, two new groups will be formed, Groups E and F. The qualified teams from Groups A and B will make up Group E, while those from Groups C and D will compete in Group F. There, teams will once again face each opponent once. The top two from each group will move on to the Final 4. The winners of the Semi-Finals in the Final 4 will play for the championship, while the losing teams will battle for third place.

=== Group A ===
The games of Group A were played from 2 to 4 October 2026 in Oliva, Argentina.

Pos	Team	Pld	W	L	PF	PA	PD	Pts	Qualification
1	(Brazil) Mogi das Cruzes	3	3	0	267	215	+52	6	Advance to quarter-finals
2	(Argentina) Independiente (H)	3	2	1	251	219	+32	5	Advance to quarter-finals
3	(Paraguay) Olimpia Kings	3	1	2	243	268	−25	4	
4	(Ecuador) Importadora Alvarado	3	0	3	208	267	−59	3	

Source: FIBA
(H) Hosts

2 October 2026	Olimpia Kings (Paraguay)	80–89	(Brazil) Mogi das Cruzes	Oliva
19:10 UTC−3	Scoring by quarter: 17–28, 16–16, 29–25, 18–20
	Pts: Wilson 19; Rebs: Wilson 7 Asts: four players 2	Boxscore	Pts: Von Haydin 21; Rebs: three players 7 Asts: De Paula 9	Arena: El Gigante; Referees: Andrés Bartel (URU), Carmelo de la Rosa (PUR), Danilo Molina (ARG)

2 October 2026	Independiente (Argentina)	85–60	(Ecuador) Importadora Alvarado	Oliva
21:40 UTC−3	Scoring by quarter: 24–6, 26–14, 10–24, 25–16
	Pts: Guerrero 21; Rebs: Grytsak, Vallejos 6 Asts: Rolfi 5	Boxscore	Pts: Granberry 21; Rebs: Lugli 10; Asts: Lugli 5	Arena: El Gigante; Referees: Carlos Pallares (COL), Jassmany Choque (BOL), Roberto Vázquez (PUR)

3 October 2026	Mogi das Cruzes (Brazil)	91–70	(Ecuador) Importadora Alvarado	Oliva
19:10 UTC−3	Scoring by quarter: 18–18, 20–15, 28–15, 25–22
	Pts: Von Haydin 20; Rebs: André 12; Asts: De Paula 6	Boxscore	Pts: Hernández 14; Rebs: Chervo, Hernández 6 Asts: Arcila, Lugli 4	Arena: El Gigante; Referees: Jassmany Choque (BOL), Andrés Bartel (URU), Danilo Molina (ARG)

3 October 2026	Independiente (Argentina)	101–72	(Paraguay) Olimpia Kings	Oliva
21:40 UTC−3	Scoring by quarter: 21–9, 20–25, 31–22, 29–16
	Pts: Vallejos 19; Rebs: Guerrero 14; Asts: Guerrero, Rolfi 6	Boxscore	Pts: Wilson 19; Rebs: Wilson 13; Asts: Reese 5	Arena: El Gigante; Referees: Roberto Vázquez (PUR), Carlos Vélez (COL), Carmelo de la Rosa (PUR)

4 October 2026	Importadora Alvarado (Ecuador)	78–91	(Paraguay) Olimpia Kings	Oliva
19:10 UTC−3	Scoring by quarter: 11–23, 30–22, 19–28, 18–18
	Pts: Hernández 19; Rebs: Hernández 10; Asts: Arcila, Erick Mecias 5	Boxscore	Pts: Reese 14; Rebs: Wilson 9 Asts: three players 4	Arena: El Gigante; Referees: Danilo Molina (ARG), Jassmany Choque (BOL), Carmelo de la Rosa (PUR)

4 October 2026	Independiente (Argentina)	65–87	(Brazil) Mogi das Cruzes	Oliva
21:40 UTC−3	Scoring by quarter: 8–19, 16–23, 21–29, 20–16
	Pts: Guerrero 10; Rebs: three players 6 Asts: Grytsak 3	Boxscore	Pts: Von Haydin 13; Rebs: André 8 Asts: Brite 5	Arena: El Gigante; Referees: Carlos Pallares (COL), Andrés Bartel (URU), Carlos Vélez (COL)

=== Group B ===
The games of Group B were played from 9 to 11 October 2026 in Loja, Ecuador.

Pos	Team	Pld	W	L	PF	PA	PD	Pts	Qualification
1	(Ecuador) CD Jorge Guzmán (H)	3	2	1	246	251	−5	5 (Note: CD Jorge Guzmán 80–78 Nacional)	Advance to quarter-finals
2	(Uruguay) Nacional	3	2	1	281	266	+15	5	Advance to quarter-finals
3	(Brazil) Corinthians	3	1	2	265	257	+8	4 (Note: Corinthians 79–63 Regatas Corrientes)	
4	(Argentina) Regatas Corrientes	3	1	2	236	254	−18	4	

Source: FIBA
(H) Hosts
Notes:

9 October 2026	Regatas Corrientes (Argentina)	96–106	(Uruguay) Nacional	Loja
19:10 UTC−3	Scoring by quarter: 28–27, 17–23, 22–26, 29–30
	Pts: Ruesga 21; Rebs: Ruesga 10; Asts: Orresta, Montero 4	Boxscore	Pts: Ferreiras 20; Rebs: Ferreiras 14; Asts: Sifontes 7	Arena: Ciudad de Loja; Referees: Carlos Peralta (ECU), Cooper Toppings (CAN), Mariajesus Rocio Gonzalez Chaparro (CHI)

9 October 2026	CD Jorge Guzmán (Ecuador)	97–96	(Brazil) Corinthians	Loja
21:40 UTC−3	Scoring by quarter: 24–27, 20–24, 24–26, 29–19
	Pts: James 27; Rebs: Cardenas 7 Asts: James 6	Boxscore	Pts: Da Silva 26; Rebs: Da Silva 8 Asts: Corazza 13	Arena: Ciudad de Loja; Referees: Roberto Vazquez (PUR), Carlos Velez (COL), Luis Escobedo (MEX)

10 October 2026	Nacional (Uruguay)	97–90	(Brazil) Corinthians	Loja
19:10 UTC−3	Scoring by quarter: 24–23, 24–20, 24–28, 25–19
	Pts: Ferreiras 22; Rebs: Ferreiras 10; Asts: Sifontes 8	Boxscore	Pts: Borges 18; Rebs: Da Silva 8 Asts: Corazza 7	Arena: Ciudad de Loja; Referees: Carlos Peralta (ECU), Carlos Velez (COL), Luis Escobedo (MEX)

10 October 2026	CD Jorge Guzmán (Ecuador)	69–77	(Argentina) Regatas Corrientes	Loja
21:40 UTC−3	Scoring by quarter: 15–22, 21–18, 15–19, 18–18
	Pts: Griffin 20; Rebs: James 9 Asts: James 4	Boxscore	Pts: Montero 19; Rebs: Acuña 14; Asts: Orresta 6	Arena: Ciudad de Loja; Referees: Roberto Vazquez (PUR), Cooper Toppings (CAN), Juan Cantillo (COL)

11 October 2026	Corinthians (Brazil)	79–63	(Argentina) Regatas Corrientes	Loja
19:10 UTC−3	Scoring by quarter: 24–24, 18–12, 14–9, 23–18
	Pts: three players 14; Rebs: Da Silva 12; Asts: Borges 5	Boxscore	Pts: Lezcano, Gramajo 12; Rebs: Gramajo 7 Asts: Orresta 4	Arena: Ciudad de Loja; Referees: Carlos Peralta (ECU), Carlos Velez (COL), Mariajesus Rocio Gonzalez Chaparro (CHI)

11 October 2026	CD Jorge Guzmán (Ecuador)	80–78	(Uruguay) Nacional	Loja
21:40 UTC−3	Scoring by quarter: 18–23, 23–15, 16–16, 23–24
	Pts: James 20; Rebs: Christmas 9 Asts: James 6	Boxscore	Pts: King 24; Rebs: Ferreiras 7 Asts: Xavier 5	Arena: Ciudad de Loja; Referees: Roberto Vazquez (PUR), Cooper Toppings (CAN), Juan Cantillo (COL)

=== Group C ===
The games of Group C were played from 16 to 18 October 2026 in Brasília, Brazil.

Pos	Team	Pld	W	L	PF	PA	PD	Pts	Qualification
1	(Argentina) Boca Juniors	3	3	0	307	255	+52	6	Advance to quarter-finals
2	(Brazil) Brasilia (H)	3	2	1	278	270	+8	5	Advance to quarter-finals
3	(Chile) Colegio Los Leones	3	1	2	255	266	−11	4	
4	(Paraguay) San José	3	0	3	239	288	−49	3	

Source: FIBA
(H) Hosts

16 October 2026	Boca Juniors (Argentina)	101–84	(Chile) Colegio Los Leones	Brasília
19:10 UTC−3	Scoring by quarter: 27–22, 30–26, 23–14, 21–22
	Pts: Vildoza 21; Rebs: Barreiro, Lema 6 Asts: Vildoza 11	Boxscore	Pts: Rebolledo 16; Rebs: Lugo 7 Asts: Jones 4	Arena: Nilson Nelson Gymnasium; Attendance: 64; Referees: Carlos Peralta (ECU), Mirian Moraes (BRA), João Varella (BRA)

16 October 2026	Brasilia (Brazil)	101–80	(Paraguay) San José	Brasília
21:40 UTC−3	Scoring by quarter: 24–21, 32–32, 18–16, 27–11
	Pts: Barbosa 27; Rebs: Crescenzi 10; Asts: Crescenzi 6	Boxscore	Pts: Martinez 18; Rebs: Wood 7 Asts: Perry 4	Arena: Nilson Nelson Gymnasium; Referees: Roberto Fernandez (CRC), Daniel Garcia (VEN), Waseem Husainy (CAN)

17 October 2026	San José (Paraguay)	77–94	(Argentina) Boca Juniors	Brasília
19:10 UTC−3	Scoring by quarter: 23–25, 20–24, 21–25, 13–20
	Pts: Perry 28; Rebs: Perry, Peralta 7 Asts: Perry 3	Boxscore	Pts: Barreiro 25; Rebs: Barreiro 15; Asts: Vildoza 9	Arena: Nilson Nelson Gymnasium; Attendance: 61; Referees: Waseem Husainy (CAN), Carlos Peralta (ECU), João Varella (BRA)

17 October 2026	Brasilia (Brazil)	83–78(OT)	(Chile) Colegio Los Leones	Brasília
21:40 UTC−3	Scoring by quarter: 9–14, 18–29, 21–7, 23–21, Overtime: 12–7
	Pts: Fernandez 23; Rebs: Crescenzi 12; Asts: Santos 6	Boxscore	Pts: Henry 30; Rebs: Herrera, Lugo 8 Asts: Henry, Perkins 5	Arena: Nilson Nelson Gymnasium; Attendance: 847; Referees: Julio Anaya (PAN), Daniel Garcia (VEN), Roberto Fernandez (CRC)

18 October 2026	Colegio Los Leones (Chile)	93–82	(Paraguay) San José	Brasília
19:10 UTC−3	Scoring by quarter: 23–29, 28–14, 29–22, 13–17
	Pts: Jones 24; Rebs: Key 10; Asts: Herrera 10	Boxscore	Pts: Banyard 30; Rebs: Banyard 12; Asts: Martinez 6	Arena: Nilson Nelson Gymnasium; Attendance: 90; Referees: Julio Anaya (PAN), Mirian Moraes (BRA), João Varella (BRA)

18 October 2026	Brasilia (Brazil)	94–112	(Argentina) Boca Juniors	Brasília
21:40 UTC−3	Scoring by quarter: 28–34, 17–28, 29–27, 20–23
	Pts: Santos 29; Rebs: Leao 9 Asts: four players 4	Boxscore	Pts: Warren 18; Rebs: Stenta 9 Asts: Vildoza 9	Arena: Nilson Nelson Gymnasium; Attendance: 1,179; Referees: Carlos Peralta (ECU), Waseem Husainy (CAN), Roberto Fernandez (CRC)

=== Group D ===
The games of Group D were played from 23 to 25 October 2026 in Rio de Janeiro, Brazil.

Pos	Team	Pld	W	L	PF	PA	PD	Pts	Qualification
1	(Brazil) Flamengo (H)	3	3	0	242	189	+53	6	Advance to quarter-finals
2	(Colombia) Paisas	3	1	2	221	243	−22	4 (Note: Head-to-head point difference: Paisas +9, Oberá TC −4, Defensor Sporting −5.)	Advance to quarter-finals
3	(Argentina) Oberá TC	3	1	2	226	250	−24	4	
4	(Uruguay) Defensor Sporting	3	1	2	212	219	−7	4	

Source: FIBA
(H) Hosts
Notes:

23 October 2026	Defensor Sporting (Uruguay)	74–69	(Argentina) Oberá TC	Rio de Janeiro
17:10 UTC−3	Scoring by quarter: 19–15, 12–21, 14–16, 29–17
	Pts: Purifoy 15; Rebs: Heron, Bianchi 6 Asts: Santiso 11	Boxscore	Pts: Fernández 19; Rebs: Oberto 10; Asts: Prince 5	Arena: Ginásio do Maracanãzinho; Referees: Julio Anaya (PAN), Julirys Guzman (PUR), Nicolas Zivieri (BRA)

23 October 2026	Flamengo (Brazil)	84–53	(Colombia) Paisas	Rio de Janeiro
20:10 UTC−3	Scoring by quarter: 31–22, 22–11, 20–11, 11–9
	Pts: Yago 13; Rebs: Montero 11; Asts: Yago 7	Boxscore	Pts: Roque, Peña 9 Rebs: Clemente 11; Asts: Roque 4	Arena: Ginásio do Maracanãzinho; Referees: Andrés Bartel (URU), Daniel Garcia (VEN), Nicolas Flores (PAR)

24 October 2026	Paisas (Colombia)	85–75	(Uruguay) Defensor Sporting	Rio de Janeiro
17:10 UTC−3	Scoring by quarter: 16–17, 22–17, 25–17, 22–24
	Pts: Jackson 23; Rebs: García 7 Asts: three players 3	Boxscore	Pts: Bianchi 17; Rebs: Davis 10; Asts: Santiso 6	Arena: Ginásio do Maracanãzinho; Referees: Julio Anaya (PAN), Julirys Guzman (PUR), Nicolas Zivieri (BRA)

24 October 2026	Flamengo (Brazil)	93–73	(Argentina) Oberá TC	Rio de Janeiro
20:10 UTC−3	Scoring by quarter: 27–15, 16–21, 28–18, 22–19
	Pts: Yago, Montero 17; Rebs: Djalo 7 Asts: Yago 8	Boxscore	Pts: Vorhees 14; Rebs: three players 6 Asts: Fernández, Brocal 4	Arena: Ginásio do Maracanãzinho; Referees: Andrés Bartel (URU), Roberto Fernandez (CRC), Nicolas Flores (PAR)

25 October 2026	Oberá TC (Argentina)	84–83	(Colombia) Paisas	Rio de Janeiro
17:10 UTC−3	Scoring by quarter: 26–19, 18–18, 17–22, 23–24
	Pts: Prince 19; Rebs: Prince 10; Asts: Sansimoni 8	Boxscore	Pts: Roque 25; Rebs: García 11; Asts: Roque 5	Arena: Ginásio do Maracanãzinho; Referees: Andrés Bartel (URU), Roberto Fernandez (CRC), Nicolas Flores (PAR)

25 October 2026	Flamengo (Brazil)	65–63	(Uruguay) Defensor Sporting	Rio de Janeiro
20:10 UTC−3	Scoring by quarter: 17–17, 12–10, 16–17, 20–19
	Pts: Negrete 18; Rebs: Negrete 10; Asts: Yago 10	Boxscore	Pts: Giano 15; Rebs: Davis 7 Asts: Giano 4	Arena: Ginásio do Maracanãzinho; Referees: Julio Anaya (PAN), Daniel Garcia (VEN), Julirys Guzman (PUR)

== Quarterfinals ==
The eight teams which advanced from the group phase will play in this stage and were split into two groups, in which each team faces the other teams in the group once. Each group tournament will be held at the arena of a host team. The two highest-placed teams advance to the Final 4.

=== Group E ===
The games of Group E will be played from 30 October to 1 November 2026 in Mogi das Cruzes, Brazil.

Pos	Team	Pld	W	L	PF	PA	PD	Pts	Qualification
1	(Brazil) Mogi das Cruzes (H)	3	3	0	270	227	+43	6	Advance to Final Four
2	(Uruguay) Nacional	3	2	1	279	268	+11	5	Advance to Final Four
3	(Argentina) Independiente	3	1	2	304	285	+19	4	
4	(Ecuador) CD Jorge Guzmán	3	0	3	232	305	−73	3	

Source: FIBA
(H) Hosts

30 October 2026	Independiente (Argentina)	98–101	(Uruguay) Nacional	Mogi das Cruzes
17:10 UTC−3	Scoring by quarter: 34–30, 29–34, 14–13, 21–24
	Pts: Vallejos 23; Rebs: Filippetti 6 Asts: Guerrero, Filippetti 4	Boxscore	Pts: Goudelock 22; Rebs: Ferreiras 15; Asts: Sifontes 4	Arena: Ginasio Professor Hugo Ramos; Attendance: 102; Referees: Roberto Vazquez (PUR), Fernando Leite (BRA), Claudio Osorio (CHI)

30 October 2026	Mogi das Cruzes (Brazil)	89–59	(Ecuador) CD Jorge Guzmán	Mogi das Cruzes
20:10 UTC−3	Scoring by quarter: 21–15, 20–12, 18–14, 30–18
	Pts: Fuzaro, Von Haydin 16; Rebs: Andre 9 Asts: Georginho 8	Boxscore	Pts: Griffin 17; Rebs: Alexander 11; Asts: Griffin 7	Arena: Ginasio Professor Hugo Ramos; Attendance: 931; Referees: Omar Bermudez (MEX), Nicolas Flores (PAR), Juan Cantillo (COL)

31 October 2026	Nacional (Uruguay)	102–88	(Ecuador) CD Jorge Guzmán	Mogi das Cruzes
16:10 UTC−3	Scoring by quarter: 31–24, 32–30, 20–23, 24–11
	Pts: King 25; Rebs: Ferreiras 14; Asts: three players 5	Boxscore	Pts: James 23; Rebs: Cardenas 9 Asts: Guerra 5	Arena: Ginasio Professor Hugo Ramos; Attendance: 100; Referees: Juan Fernandez (ARG), Fernando Leite (BRA), Juan Cantillo (COL)

31 October 2026	Mogi das Cruzes (Brazil)	99–97	(Argentina) Independiente	Mogi das Cruzes
19:10 UTC−3	Scoring by quarter: 24–20, 31–33, 19–22, 25–22
	Pts: Dias 20; Rebs: Georginho 8 Asts: Georginho 5	Boxscore	Pts: Vallejos 17; Rebs: Grytsak 9 Asts: Rolfi 6	Arena: Ginasio Professor Hugo Ramos; Referees: Omar Bermudez (MEX), Nicolas Flores (PAR), Claudio Osorio (CHI)

1 November 2026	CD Jorge Guzmán (Ecuador)	85–109	(Argentina) Independiente	Mogi das Cruzes
16:10 UTC−3	Scoring by quarter: 22–32, 20–31, 16–23, 27–23
	Pts: Griffin 22; Rebs: Mainoldi, Alexander 5 Asts: three players 3	Boxscore	Pts: Barrionuevo 18; Rebs: Filippetti 8 Asts: Rolfi 10	Arena: Ginasio Professor Hugo Ramos; Referees: Omar Bermudez (MEX), Nicolas Flores (PAR), Fernando Leite (BRA)

1 November 2026	Mogi das Cruzes (Brazil)	82–71	(Uruguay) Nacional	Mogi das Cruzes
19:10 UTC−3	Scoring by quarter: 21–19, 17–18, 23–11, 21–23
	Pts: Andre 16; Rebs: Andre, Georginho 8 Asts: Georginho 6	Boxscore	Pts: Ferreiras 15; Rebs: Sifontes 9 Asts: Sifontes, Xavier 5	Arena: Ginasio Professor Hugo Ramos; Referees: Roberto Vazquez (PUR), Juan Fernandez (ARG), Claudio Osorio (CHI)

=== Group F ===
Pos	Team	Pld	W	L	PF	PA	PD	Pts	Qualification
1	(Brazil) Flamengo	3	2	1	269	229	+40	5	Advance to Final Four
2	(Brazil) Brasilia	3	2	1	241	224	+17	5	Advance to Final Four
3	(Argentina) Boca Juniors	3	2	1	242	246	−4	5	
4	(Colombia) Paisas (H)	3	0	3	226	279	−53	3	

Source: FIBA
(H) Hosts

13 November 2026	Brasilia (Brazil)	74–76	(Argentina) Boca Juniors	Medellín
17:10 UTC−5	Scoring by quarter: 21–16, 18–13, 15–26, 20–21
	Pts: Leao, Cylla 17; Rebs: Cylla. Fernández 8 Asts: Crescenzi 4	Boxscore	Pts: Barreiro 18; Rebs: Cáffaro 10; Asts: Warren 5	Arena: Coliseo Universidad de Medellin; Attendance: 100; Referees: Omar Bermudez (MEX), Julirys Guzman (PUR), Samuel Hidalgo (DOM)

13 November 2026	Paisas (Colombia)	71–104	(Brazil) Flamengo	Medellín
20:10 UTC−5	Scoring by quarter: 16–24, 24–22, 19–31, 12–27
	Pts: Artis 19; Rebs: Roque 6 Asts: García 4	Boxscore	Pts: Yago 26; Rebs: Miranda 10; Asts: Yago, Montero 4	Arena: Coliseo Universidad de Medellin; Attendance: 100; Referees: Juan Fernandez (ARG), Krishna Dominguez (MEX), Luis Escobedo (MEX)

14 November 2026	Flamengo (Brazil)	83–84	(Brazil) Brasilia	Medellín
16:10 UTC−5	Scoring by quarter: 20–15, 11–29, 35–21, 17–19
	Pts: Yago 17; Rebs: Montero 16; Asts: Yago, Borges 5	Boxscore	Pts: Crescenzi 18; Rebs: Bastian 8 Asts: Santos 3	Arena: Coliseo Universidad de Medellin; Attendance: 300; Referees: Juan Fernandez (ARG), Johnny Batista (PUR), Luis Escobedo (MEX)

14 November 2026	Paisas (Colombia)	90–92(OT)	(Argentina) Boca Juniors	Medellín
19:40 UTC−5	Scoring by quarter: 27–22, 17–24, 17–13, 20–22, Overtime: 9–11
	Pts: García 18; Rebs: Artis 13; Asts: Roque 6	Boxscore	Pts: Lema 19; Rebs: Cáffaro 10; Asts: Faggiano, Vildoza 4	Arena: Coliseo Universidad de Medellin; Attendance: 560; Referees: Omar Bermudez (MEX), Krishna Dominguez (MEX), Julirys Guzman (PUR)

15 November 2026	Boca Juniors (Argentina)	74–82	(Brazil) Flamengo	Medellín
16:10 UTC−5	Scoring by quarter: 19–18, 17–12, 18–25, 20–27
	Pts: Cáffaro 16; Rebs: Monacchi 12; Asts: five players 2	Boxscore	Pts: Yago 17; Rebs: Djalo 7 Asts: Montero 5	Arena: Coliseo Universidad de Medellin; Attendance: 300; Referees: Omar Bermudez (MEX), Johnny Batista (PUR), Julirys Guzman (PUR)

15 November 2026	Paisas (Colombia)	65–83	(Brazil) Brasilia	Medellín
19:10 UTC−5	Scoring by quarter: 14–23, 16–21, 16–15, 19–24
	Pts: Jackson, Bearden 15; Rebs: Bearden 11; Asts: Lozano 5	Boxscore	Pts: Fernández 16; Rebs: Bastian 10; Asts: Santos 7	Arena: Coliseo Universidad de Medellin; Attendance: 100; Referees: Juan Fernandez (ARG), Krishna Dominguez (MEX), Samuel Hidalgo (DOM)

== Final Four ==
The Final Four will take place on 5 and 6 December 2025.

=== Bracket ===
Semifinals
5 December
(Brazil) Mogi das Cruzes
(Brazil) Brasilia
5 December
(Brazil) Flamengo
(Uruguay) Nacional

Final
6 December
(To be determined) TBD
(To be determined) TBD
Third place game
6 December
(To be determined) TBD
(To be determined) TBD

=== Semifinals ===
5 December 2026	Mogi das Cruzes (Brazil)	vs.	(Brazil) Brasilia
	Scoring by quarter: –, –, –, –
		Boxscore

5 December 2026	Flamengo (Brazil)	vs.	(Uruguay) Nacional
	Scoring by quarter: –, –, –, –
		Boxscore

=== Third place game ===
6 December 2026	TBD (To be determined)	vs.	(To be determined) TBD
	Scoring by quarter: –, –, –, –
		Boxscore

=== Final ===
6 December 2026	TBD (To be determined)	vs.	(To be determined) TBD
	Scoring by quarter: –, –, –, –
		Boxscore
