= Alhassan Barrie =

Belgian basketball player

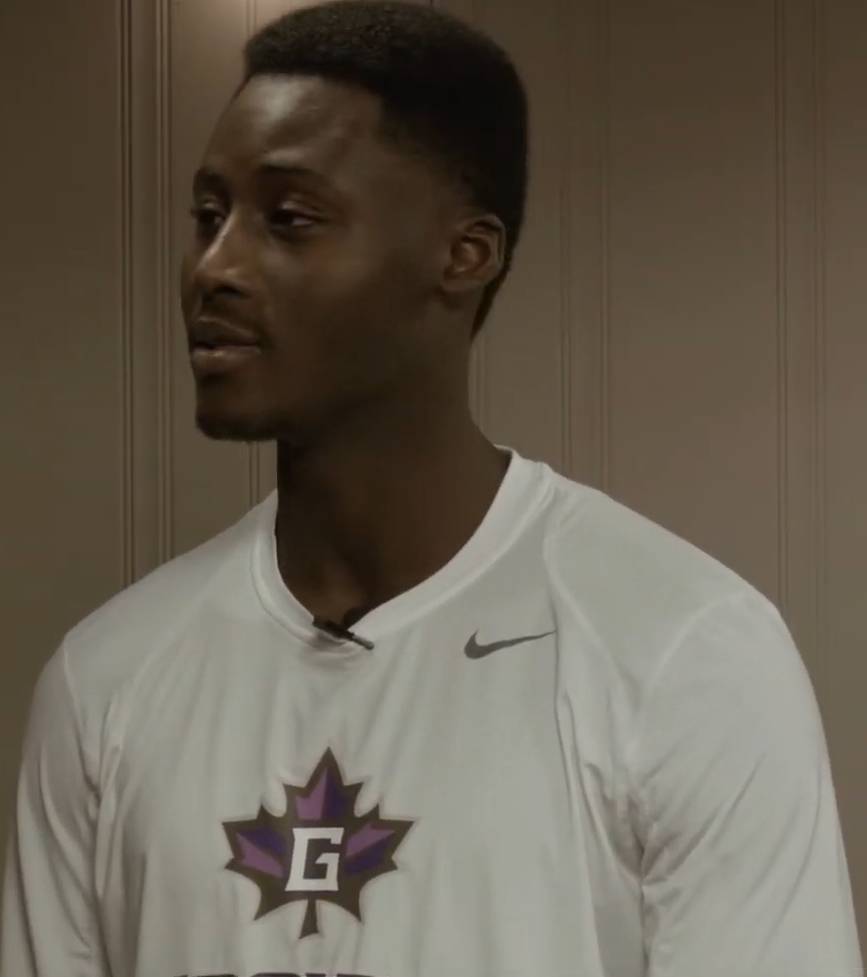

Gembo BBC
- Position: Small forward
- League: Top Division 1

Personal information
- Born: 30 July 1995 (age 30) Antwerp, Belgium
- Listed height: 196 cm (6 ft 5 in)
- Listed weight: 108 kg (238 lb)

Career information
- College: Northern Oklahoma (2015–2016); Goshen (2016–2019)
- NBA draft: 2019: undrafted
- Playing career: 2019–present

Career history
- 2019: Basketball Löwen Erfurt
- 2020: CAM Enrique Soler
- 2020–2021: The Hague Royals
- 2020–2021: Gembo BBC

Alhassan Barrie (born 30 July 1995) is a Belgian basketball player for Gembo BBC of the Top Division 1. After three years of college basketball at Northern Oklahoma and Goshen, he has professionally played in Germany, Spain and the Netherlands.

== College career ==
Barrie started playing college basketball with the Northern Oklahoma Mavericks. After one season, he left to play two years with the Goshen Maple Leafs. In his final year with Goshen, he averaged 8 points and 4 rebounds per game.

== Professional career ==
On 29 July 2019, Barrie signed his first professional contract with Basketball Löwen Erfurt in Germany. In January 2020, Barrie signed with CAM Enrique Soler in the Spanish Liga EBA.

On 5 September 2020, Barrie signed with newly established club The Hague Royals of the Dutch Basketball League (DBL). He averaged 8.6 points and 4.4 rebounds over the 2020–21 season. On 13 September 2021, Barrie signed with Gembo BBC of the Top Division 1.
