= Joost de Valk =

Internet entrepreneur (born 1982)

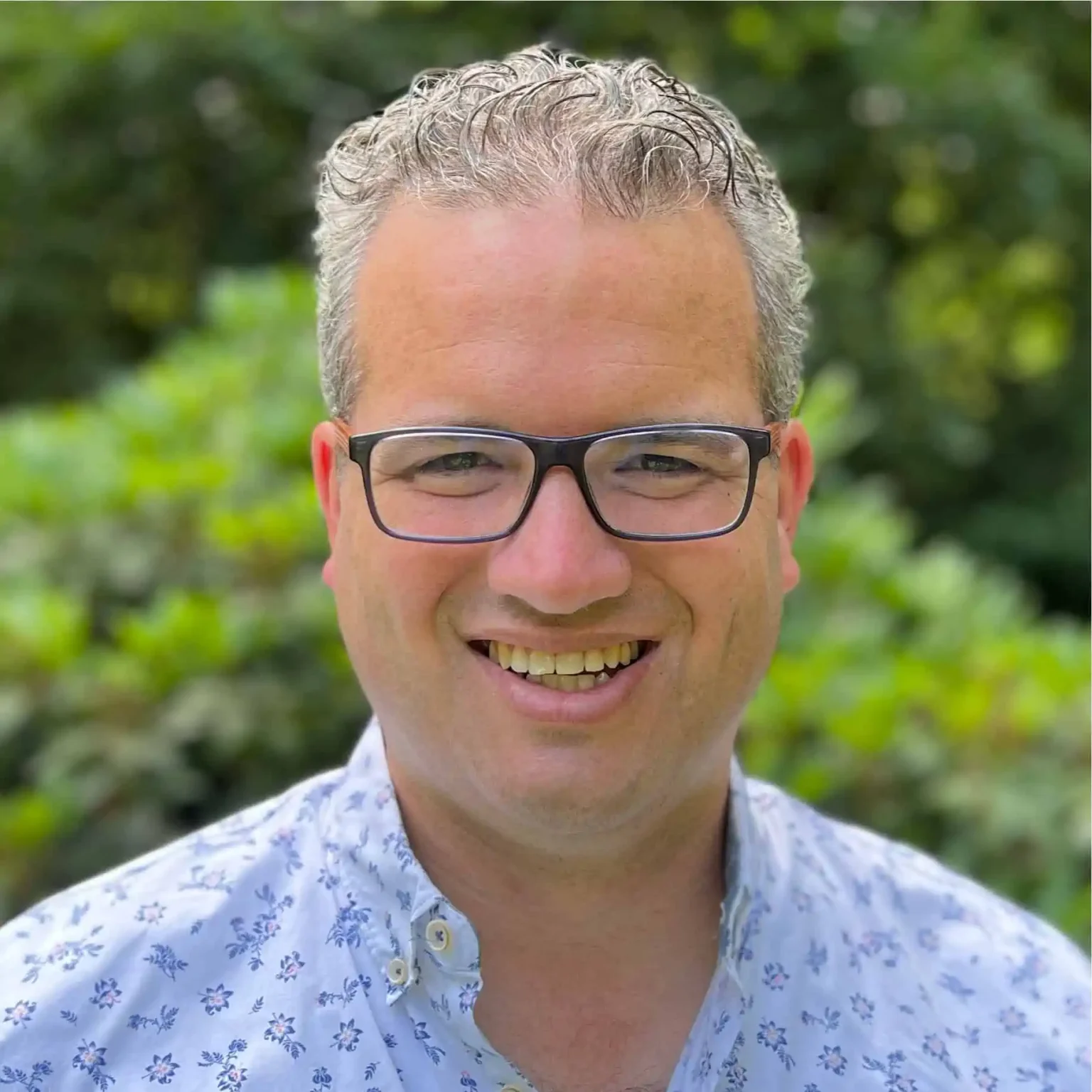
- Born: February 16, 1982 (age 44)
- Occupations: Entrepreneur, App developer
- Years active: 2007-present
- Known for: Yoast SEO
- Notable work: WordPress SEO
- Website: joost.blog

Joost de Valk is an entrepreneur and application software developer from Wijchen, Netherlands who is best known for Yoast SEO. De Valk started out as a consultant and blogger in 2004 before developing Yoast, one of the most successful plug-ins for WordPress.

== Career ==
De Valk started out as a consultant for companies like: eBay, The Guardian, Disney, and other major companies. Working on the plugin was a hobby in his spare time. De Valk started a blog in 2004, and by 2005 his website for SEO was named "joostdevalk.nl". After moving to and eventually selling the domain "css3.info," de Valk created the Yoast platform in 2007. He launched the first version of WordPress SEO in 2010, and founded the company Yoast BV in 2010.

At first, the Yoast company was to consult before he developed both the Yoast SEO plugin and a Google Analytics plugin, both for WordPress. In 2012, De Valk released a premium version of Yoast SEO. In April 2016, Yoast BV sold the Google Analytics for WordPress plugin. In June 2020, Yoast acquired the Duplicate Post plugin, another very popular WordPress plugin.

The software that De Valk created runs on more than nine million websites and on 11.4% of the top million sites in the world. On WordPress, the De Valk SEO software has been downloaded five million times. Michael David, the author of WordPress Search Engine Optimization (2015), referred to it as "the granddaddy of all SEO plugins".

In January 2019 De Valk stepped down as CEO to become Chief Product Officer for Yoast and began working for WordPress in marketing. De Valk's wife Marieke van de Rakt, took over as director (CEO) of Yoast. De Valk left his position with WordPress after six months citing a failure to see his place in the organization. De Valk and his wife are investors in blockchain startup WordProof.

In January 2025, in response to the WordPress dispute with WP Engine, Joost de Valk introduced a blog post announcing his plans for federated and independent repositories to WordPress.org. In response, Automattic CEO Matt Mullenweg issued a blog post stating that he will be deactivating the accounts of the contributors, labeling the plans as a "fork" of WordPress, which the contributors denied.

== Personal ==
When De Valk was twelve years old he borrowed money from his parents for a computer; he then began building websites. He attended the University of Applied Sciences and continued in Internet Technology. At 24 years old he became a father. De Valk married Marieke van de Rakt and together they had four children. Marieke was a professor with a Ph.D and she left her job in 2013 to support Yoast SEO.
