= Wietze Nossek =

Dutch basketball player

Wietse Nossek
Personal information
- Born: February 22, 1998 (age 28) Veldhoven, Noord Brabant, Netherlands
- Listed height: 6 ft 8 in (2.03 m)

Career information
- Playing career: 2016–present
- Position: Center
- Number: 22

Career history
- 2016–2017: New Heroes
- 2017–2022: BAL
- 2022–2024: QSTA United
- 2024–2025: Team FOG Naestved
- 2025–2026: Donar

Career highlights
- 2x Dutch Cup winner (2021, 2026)

Wietze Nossek (born February 22, 1998) is a Dutch professional basketball player who last played for Donar in the BNXT League and ENBL.

== Professional career ==
Nossek started his career with New Heroes in 2016 but switched a year later to BAL.

In 2021 Nossek won his first prize with BAL, winning the 2021 Dutch Cup as underdogs.

In 2022, after 5 years with BAL, Nossek switched to QSTA United.

In 2024, Nossek signed with the Danish team Team FOG Naestved, playing in the Basketligaen, for his first foreign adventure.

After his year playing in Denmark, Nossek switched in 2025 back to the BNXT League after signing with Donar. With Donar he also played in the ENBL. That season he also won his second trophy, winning the Dutch Cup again.
