= Quatarrius Wilson =

American basketball player (born 1996)

No. 9 – Panthers Schwenningen
- Position: Power forward
- League: ProA

Personal information
- Born: June 26, 1996 (age 30) Mobile, Alabama
- Listed height: 204 cm (6 ft 8 in)
- Listed weight: 97 kg (214 lb)

Career information
- High school: Gardendale High School (Gardendale, Alabama)
- College: Moberly (2016–2017); McNeese State (2017–2018); Southeast Missouri State (2019–2020)
- NBA draft: 2020: undrafted
- Playing career: 2020–present

Career history
- 2020–2021: BAL
- 2021–2022: Panthers Schwenningen
- 2022–present: Köping Stars

Career highlights
- Dutch Cup champion (2021); DBL rebounding leader (2021)

Quatarrius Deaundrey Wilson (born June 26, 1996) is an American basketball player who plays for Köping Stars in the Swedish Basketball League. Standing at 204 cm (6 ft 8 1/2 in), he plays as power forward.

== College career ==
Wilson played collegiate with Moberly, McNeese State and Southeast Missouri State.

== Professional career ==
On June 26, 2021, Wilson signed in the Netherlands with BAL of the Dutch Basketball League (DBL). He helped the team qualify for the playoffs for the first time while leading the league in rebounding. On 2 May 2021, BAL surprisingly won the DBL Cup with BAL after defeating Yoast United in the final. Wilson recorded 14 points, 15 rebounds and 5 assists in the won championship game.

In the following season, the 2021–22 season, Wilson played for Panthers Schwenningen of the German ProA.

On June 16, 2022, Wilson signed with the Swedish club Köping Stars of the Swedish Basketball League for the upcoming season.
