= VfL AstroStars Bochum =

- Leagues: ProA
- Founded: 2011; 15 years ago
- History: VfL AstroStars Bochum (2011–present)
- Arena: Bones Hands Arena
- Capacity: 1,536
- Location: Bochum, Germany
- President: Tobias Steinert
- Head coach: Felix Banobre
- Team captain: Niklas Geske
- Website: sparkassenstars.de
Home	Away

VfL AstroStars Bochum, for sponsorship reasons named VfL SparkassenStars Bochum, is a professional basketball club based in Bochum, Germany. Since the 2022/23 season, the club competes in the second tier ProA league.

VfL AstroStars Bochum is a departmental club of VfL Bochum.

At the end of 2016, it was the sixth largest German basketball club with 555 active players.

== History ==
Formed in 2011, it is the successor club of VfL Bochum BG and was formed by its merger with BG Südpark Bochum. The club took over the licenses of its predecessor clubs on July 1, 2012, and has been competing since the 2012/2013 season.

Since the 2017/18 season, the club's 1st team has played under the name VfL SparkassenStars Bochum.

During the 2022/23 ProA season, under head coach Felix Banobre, Bochum fared well. Their top players included Hendrik Drescher, Jalen Bradey and others. Bochum defeated Tübingen twice during Tübingen's promotion season. Tübingen had previously won five games in a row. Tübingen had never ceded 98 points until they faced Bochum.

After the season, Bochum lost Hendrik Drescher. Bochum would have liked to keep him and was willing to "go to the pain barrier," as general manager Tobias Steinert said. In the club's farewell message, Drescher was quoted as saying, "I would like to express my sincere thanks to the entire club and, of course, to the fans who made last season an unforgettable one, for me personally. Anytime I remember it fondly, I can't wait to play as a guest in the Rundsporthalle next season."

Drescher was the third departure officially confirmed by the club after TJ Crockett and Jonas Grof. Lars Kamp and Niklas Geske extended their contracts.

Bochum team bus in early 2025.

== Players ==
=== Current roster ===
Note: Flags indicate national team eligibility at FIBA-sanctioned events. Players may hold other non-FIBA nationalities not displayed.

VfL AstroStars Bochum roster
Players
Coaches

Pos.	No.	Nat.	Name	Ht.	Wt.	Age
SF	3	(Germany)	Kuku, Gabriel	1.90 m (6 ft 3 in)	85 kg (187 lb)	24 – 22 November 2001
PG	4	(Germany)	Geske, Niklas (C)	1.88 m (6 ft 2 in)	83 kg (183 lb)	32 – 13 April 1994
SG	5	(Germany)	Pisic, David	2.00 m (6 ft 7 in)	87 kg (192 lb)	23 – 29 October 2003
PF	7	(Germany)	Pickett, Aitor	2.03 m (6 ft 8 in)	100 kg (220 lb)	27 – 5 June 1999
C	8	(Germany)	Dietz, Kilian	2.02 m (6 ft 8 in)	109 kg (240 lb)	36 – 9 November 1990
PF	10	(Germany)	Masnic, Neil	2.06 m (6 ft 9 in)	102 kg (225 lb)	26 – 10 May 2000
SG	13	(Germany)	Neumann, Mats	1.88 m (6 ft 2 in)	70 kg (154 lb)	17 – 28 April 2009
PF	15	(United States)	Kamarad, Thomas	2.03 m (6 ft 8 in)	93 kg (205 lb)	25 – 11 February 2001
PF	16	(Germany)	Estelle, Pablo	2.00 m (6 ft 7 in)	93 kg (205 lb)	19 – 30 April 2007
PG	21	(Germany)	Janeck, Dyami	1.88 m (6 ft 2 in)	82 kg (181 lb)	21 – 10 October 2005
PF	22	(Germany)	Scholz, Neo	2.03 m (6 ft 8 in)	90 kg (198 lb)	17 – 13 January 2009
SG	23	(United States)	Wesley, Jaylen	1.93 m (6 ft 4 in)	84 kg (185 lb)	22 – 11 October 2004
SG	24	(United States)	Black, JaMonta	1.93 m (6 ft 4 in)	82 kg (181 lb)	25 – 26 January 2001
PG	42	(Germany)	Klotz, Conrad	1.83 m (6 ft 0 in)	83 kg (183 lb)	20 – 7 December 2005

Head coach

- (Spain) Alvaro Sanchez Paredes

Assistant coach(es)

- (Belarus) Alexander Osipovitch
- (Germany) Petar Topalski

Legend

- (C) Team captain
- Injured

- Roster
Updated: November 17, 2026

== Notable players ==
To appear in this section a player must have either:

– Set a club record or won an individual award as a professional player.
– Played at least one official international match for his senior national team at any time.

- (Germany) Jonas Grof
- (Gabon) Willy Asseko
- (Netherlands) Craig Osaikhwuwuomwan
- (United Kingdom) Conner Washington
- (United States) Jalen Bradley
- (United States) TJ Crockett
- (United States) Dominic Green
- (United States) Gary Johnson
- (United States) Vincent Simpson
- (United States) Pinky Smith
