= Emmanuel Nzekwesi =

Dutch basketball player (born 1997)

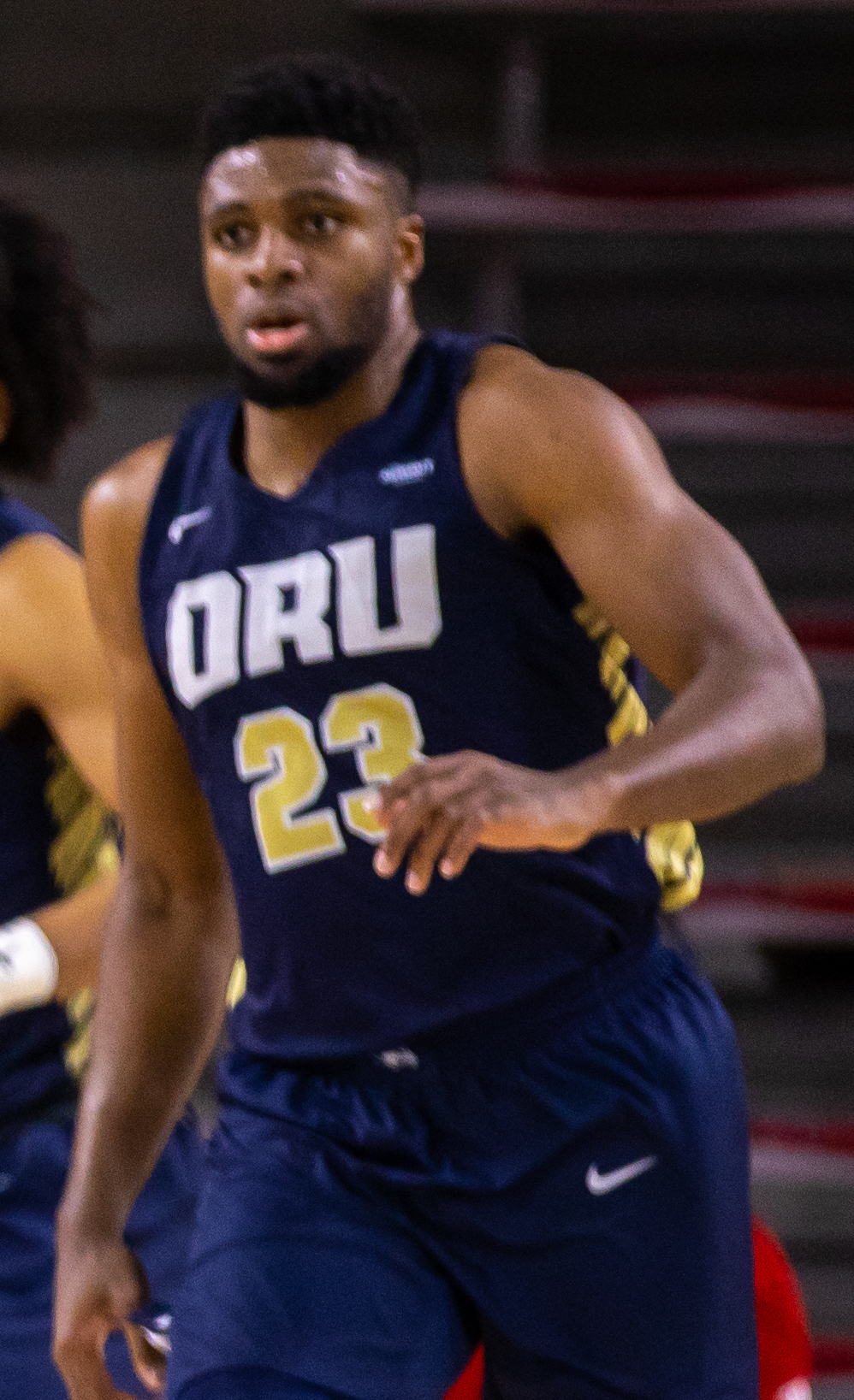
- Nzekwesi in 2020

No. 15 – Juventus Utena
- Position: Power forward / center
- League: LKL; BCL

Personal information
- Born: 5 September 1997 (age 29) The Hague, Netherlands
- Listed height: 6 ft 8 in (2.03 m)
- Listed weight: 240 lb (109 kg)

Career information
- High school: Byron Nelson (Trophy Club, Texas); Moravian Prep (Hudson, North Carolina)
- College: Oral Roberts (2016–2020)
- NBA draft: 2020: undrafted
- Playing career: 2020–present

Career history
- 2020–2021: ZZ Leiden
- 2021–2022: Mons-Hainaut
- 2022–2023: ESSM Le Portel
- 2023–2024: Cholet
- 2024: Hapoel Gilboa Galil
- 2024–2025: Śląsk Wrocław
- 2025–2026: CSM Oradea
- 2026–present: Juventus Utena

Career highlights
- BNXT League Dream Team (2022); DBL champion (2021); DBL Most Valuable Player (2021); DBL All-Star Team (2021); DBL Rookie of the Year (2021); DBL All-Rookie Team (2021); DBL All-Defense Team (2021); DBL Statistical Player of the Year (2021); DBL scoring champion (2021); First-team All-Summit League (2020); Second-team All-Summit League (2019); Summit League Freshman of the Year (2017)

Emmanuel Chukwubuikem Nzekwesi (born 5 September 1997) is a Dutch professional basketball player for Juventus Utena of the Lithuanian Basketball League (LKL) and the Basketball Champions League (BCL). He played college basketball for Oral Roberts.

== Early life ==
Nzekwesi grew up in The Hague and began playing basketball at the age of two, and his parents enrolled him in lessons at age seven. Before his sophomore season in high school, he moved to Texas and began attending Byron Nelson High School. Nzekwesi scored 22 points without missing a shot against Paul Laurence Dunbar High School during his sophomore season. As a senior, Nzekwesi averaged 19.4 points and 11.3 rebounds per game. He gained the attention of Damian Lillard's trainer, Phil Beckner, and later, Weber State head coach Randy Rahe.

Nzekwesi signed a letter of intent with Weber State, but problems with his visa precluded him from attending the school. He played a postgraduate season at Moravian Prep in Hudson, North Carolina to help attract more scholarship offers. Nzekwesi accepted a scholarship offer from Oral Roberts, which had previously recruited him in high school.

== College career ==
Nzekwesi redshirted his true freshman season at Oral Roberts. As a redshirt freshman, he averaged 9.8 points and 6.4 rebounds per game. Nzekwesi was named Summit League freshman of the year, though Oral Roberts won eight games. Following the season coach Scott Sutton was fired. Nzekwesi posted 12.7 points and 7.2 rebounds per game as a sophomore. On 3 January 2019 he scored a career-high 34 points in an 83–72 win against North Dakota. As a junior, Nzekwesi averaged 14.8 points and 8.5 rebounds per game. He was named to the Second Team All-Summit League. During Nzekwesi's senior season, he missed seven games with different injuries. He averaged 16.3 points and 9.9 rebounds per game as a senior. Nzekwesi was named to the First Team All-Summit League as well as team MVP by the Tulsa World.

== Professional career ==
=== ZZ Leiden ===
On 13 August 2020 Nzekwesi signed his first professional contract with ZZ Leiden of the Dutch Basketball League (DBL). He made his professional debut on 3 October, recording a double-double with 18 points and 13 rebounds in a 104–102 loss to the Den Helder Suns.

Nzekwesi finished the regular season having led Leiden to the first seed, while leading the league in scoring with 21.7 points and 8.7 rebounds per game. On 24 April 2021, Nzekwesi won the DBL Most Valuable Player award. He broke records for the most awards won by a player ever, as he was also named Rookie of the Year and Statistical Player of the Year while also being on the All-Star Team, All-Defense Team and All-Rookie Team. In the Statistical Player of the Year ranking, he broke an all-time record with an efficiency rating of 26.4. He also won the DBL championship with Leiden on 27 May, after sweeping Heroes Den Bosch in the finals.

=== Mons-Hainaut ===
On 19 July 2021, Nzekwesi signed a one-year contract with Belgian club Belfius Mons-Hainaut. In the 2021 offseason, Nzekwesi played in the 2021 NBA Summer League with the Phoenix Suns. He came second in the voting for the BNXT League Most Valuable Player award, behind winner Levi Randolph.

=== ESSM Le Portel ===
On 4 June 2022 he signed with ESSM Le Portel of the LNB Pro A.

=== Cholet Basket ===
On 27 June 2023 Nzekwesi signed with Cholet Basket of the French LNB Pro A.

=== Hapoel Gilboa Galil ===
On 19 June 2024 he signed with Hapoel Gilboa Galil of the Israeli Basketball Premier League.

=== Śląsk Wrocław ===
On December 4, 2024, he signed with Śląsk Wrocław of the Polish Basketball League (PLK).

=== CSM U Oradea ===
On August 9, 2025, he signed with CSM Oradea of the Liga Națională.

=== Juventus Utena ===
On October 8, 2026, Nzekwesi signed with Juventus Utena of the Lithuanian Basketball League (LKL) and the Basketball Champions League (BCL).

== National team career ==
In July 2017, Nzekwesi was named to the Dutch national team at the FIBA U20 European Championship Division B. He averaged 14.3 points, 5.8 rebounds, and 1.3 assists per game.

In November 2020, Nzekwesi was selected for the Dutch senior team for the first time.

== Personal life ==
Nzekwesi is the son of Chioma and Emmanuel Nzekwesi. He has a wife, Tatum. Nzekwesi is a member of Transformation Church and has led athletic chapel.
