= Sportcampus Zuiderpark =

Indoor arena in The Hague, Netherlands

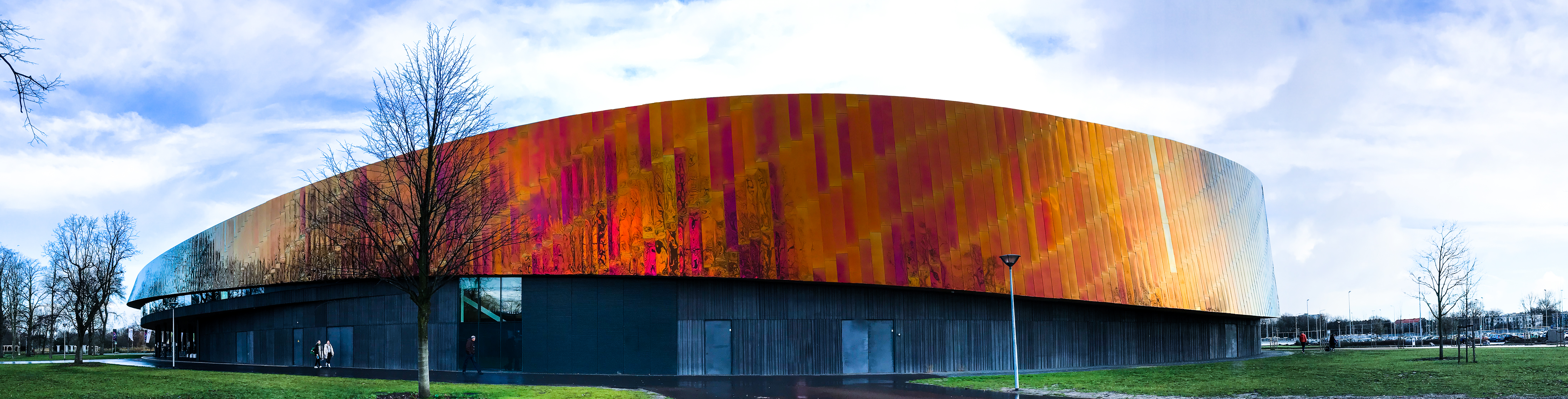
- The Sportcampus in 2017
- Interactive map of Sportcampus Zuiderpark
- Address: Meester P. Droogleever Fortuynweg 22; 2533 SR Den Haag
- Location: The Hague, Netherlands
- Coordinates: 52.05630°N 4.290677°E
- Capacity: 3,500

Construction
- Groundbreaking: 26 March 2015
- Opened: 14 June 2017
- Cost: € 73 million

Tenant
- The Hague Royals (2020–present)

Website
- sportcampuszuiderpark.nl/nl/

The Sportcampus Zuiderpark is an indoor sports arena located in The Hague, Netherlands. The arena was opened in 2017 and is used for several indoor sports and the main hall has a capacity for 3,500 people. The hall is the home arena of professional basketball club The Hague Royals of the BNXT League.

The hall is built on the location where the Zuiderparkstadion, home stadium of ADO Den Haag, was based until its demolition in 2007.

In April 2022, the Sportcampus was home to the 2020 Invictus Games.
