= BC Lūšis =

Lūšis
- Leagues: National Basketball League
- Founded: 2008
- History: Lūšis (2008-present)
- Arena: Laurynas Ivinskis gymnasium, Rietavas
- Location: Šilalė, Lithuania
- Team colors: White, red
- Head coach: Mindaugas Kriščiokaitis
- Championships: RKL 2019
Home	Away

Šilalė Lūšis (Lithuanian: Šilalės Lūšis) is a professional basketball team, it is based in Šilalė, Lithuania and currently competes in National Basketball League.

== Current roster ==
Note: Flags indicate national team eligibility at FIBA-sanctioned events. Players may hold other non-FIBA nationalities not displayed.

BC Lūšis roster
Players
Coaches

Pos.	No.	Nat.	Name	Ht.	Wt.	Age
SG	1	(Lithuania)	Čepauskas, Mindaugas	1.86 m (6 ft 1 in)	75 kg (165 lb)	36 – 12 July 1989
SF	5	(Lithuania)	Gustas, Julius	1.88 m (6 ft 2 in)	85 kg (187 lb)	36 – 28 July 1989
SF	7	(Lithuania)	Matutis, Raimondas	1.97 m (6 ft 6 in)	91 kg (201 lb)	35 – 7 January 1990
PG	8	(Lithuania)	Jurkaitis, Modestas	1.87 m (6 ft 2 in)	86 kg (190 lb)	30 – 17 April 1995
PF	10	(Lithuania)	Undraitis, Valdas	2.00 m (6 ft 7 in)	90 kg (198 lb)	34 – 10 December 1990
C	11	(Lithuania)	Rakevičius, Rokas	2.00 m (6 ft 7 in)	106 kg (234 lb)	35 – 22 January 1990
SG	12	(Lithuania)	Šeputis, Martynas	1.90 m (6 ft 3 in)	73 kg (161 lb)	31 – 16 July 1994
PG	13	(Lithuania)	Košys, Justas	1.83 m (6 ft 0 in)	82 kg (181 lb)	33 – 25 September 1991
PF	14	(Lithuania)	Veryga, Vidas	1.98 m (6 ft 6 in)	90 kg (198 lb)	39 – 27 April 1986

Head coach

- (Lithuania) Mindaugas Kriščiokaitis

Legend

- (C) Team captain
- Injured

- Roster
Updated: 10-15-2019

== Club achievements ==
- 2018-2019 season: RKL 1st place
