= Deividas Kumelis =

Lithuanian basketball player

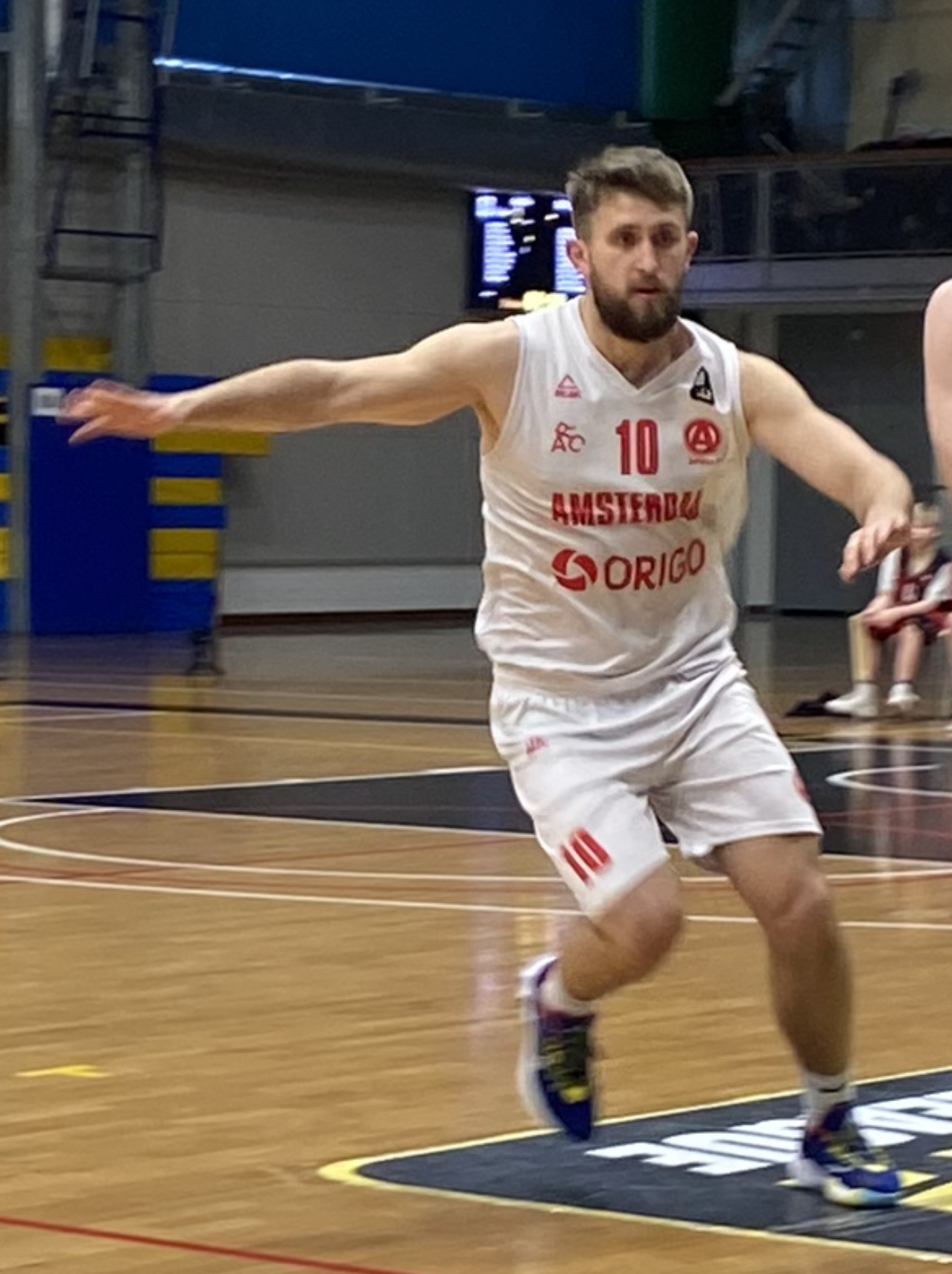
- Kumelis with Apollo Amsterdam in 2023

Rotterdam City Basketball
- Title: Head coach
- League: BNXT League

Personal information
- Born: April 6, 1995 (age 31) Vilnius, Lithuania
- Listed height: 1.78 m (5 ft 10 in)

Career information
- Playing career: 2015–2025
- Position: Point guard
- Number: 10
- Coaching career: 2025–present

Career history

Playing
- 2014–2017: Nevėžis
- 2014: CAB Madeira
- 2017–2019: Aris Leeuwarden
- 2020: Lūšis
- 2020: Mažeikiai
- 2021–2022: The Hague Royals
- 2022–2023: Apollo Amsterdam
- 2023–2025: Sakiu Vytis

Coaching
- 2026–present: Rotterdam City Basketball

Deividas Kumelis (born April 6, 1995) is a Lithuanian professional basketball coach and former player who played at the point guard position. He is the current head coach for Rotterdam City Basketball of the BNXT League. Kumelis has played in Lithuania, Portugal and the Netherlands over his career.

== Early life ==
Kumelis started playing basketball at age 17 at the Šarūnas Marčiulionis Basketball Academy.

== Professional career ==
On September 28, 2017, Kumelis signed with Aris Leeuwarden of the Dutch Basketball League (DBL). In his debut on October 8, Kumelis recorded 19 points and 7 assists in an 80–96 win over BAL. He averaged 0.9 points, 0.8 rebounds and 0.3 assists in his debut season in the DBL. On August 1, 2018, he re-signed for another year with Aris. He averaged 0.6 points, 2 rebounds and 0.5 assists in the 2018–19 season.

In the 2019–20 season he played for both BC Lūšis and BC Mažeikiai of the Lithuanian National Basketball League (NKL).

On 2 October 2020, Kumelis was announced by The Hague Royals, newcomer in the Dutch Basketball League. On 27 March 2021, Kumelis scored a career-high 12 points in a 77–76 win over BAL. On 16 June, he extended his contract with one more season.

On August 22, 2022, he has signed with Apollo Amsterdam of the BNXT League.

== Coaching career ==
On February 8, 2026, he signed with Rotterdam City Basketball of the BNXT League.

== International career ==
Kumelis played with the Lithuania men's national under-20 basketball team at the 2015 FIBA Europe Under-20 Championship, where the country finished in 17th place.
