= Yoast SEO =

Search engine optimization plugin for WordPress

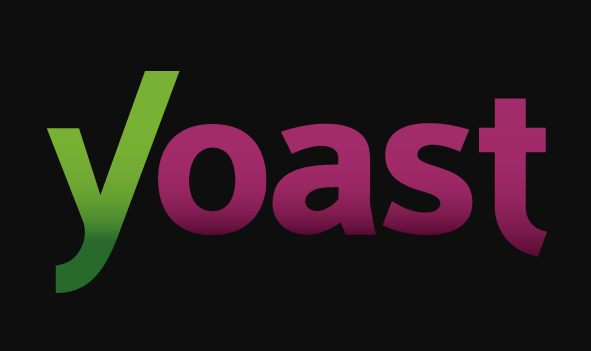
- Developer: Yoast BV
- Release: 2010; 16 years ago
- Stable release: 28.9 / 18 November 2026; 0 days ago
- Written in: JavaScript, PHP
- Platform: WordPress
- Type: Search-engine optimization
- License: GPL
- Website: yoast.com
- Repository: github.com/Yoast/wordpress-seo

Yoast SEO is a search engine optimization (SEO) tool plug-in for WordPress.

== History ==
Yoast SEO created its first WordPress SEO plugin in 2010 - originally named WordPress SEO: it was developed as a WordPress plugin by SEO consultant Joost de Valk. In 2012, the plug-in was renamed Yoast SEO. In 2015, Yoast hosted the inaugural YoastCon conference at the Lindenberg Nijmegen Culture House in Nijmegen, Netherlands.

In 2015, a flaw was discovered in version 1.7.3.3 and earlier versions. The flaw could have left users of Yoast SEO open to hackers and was discovered by a security consultant.

== Company ==
Yoast SEO can trace its origins to 2005, when Joost de Valk launched a website named "joostdevalk.nl". After moving to and eventually selling the domain "css3.info", de Valk created the Yoast platform in 2009, launched the first version of WordPress SEO in 2010 and founded the company Yoast BV in 2010.

Initially, Yoast focused on SEO consultancy, and developed both the Yoast SEO plugin and a Google Analytics plugin, both for WordPress. In 2012, a premium version of the plug-in was launched. In April 2016, Yoast BV sold the Google Analytics for WordPress plugin.

In 2018, Yoast had a total turnover of €10 million. According to Yoast, as of September 2018, they had almost 100 employees, of whom 85 are based in their HQ in Wijchen, Netherlands.

In June 2020, Yoast acquired the Duplicate Post plugin, which had over 3 million users. Also, the original developer of Duplicate Post, Enrico Battocchi, joined Yoast as a senior developer and remains one of the leading developers on the plugin.

Yoast was acquired by Newfold Digital (the company that owns the hosting provider Bluehost) in August 2021.

In September 2024, Yoast added AI features that will automatically improve sites SEO performance.

== Reception ==
Michael David, the author of WordPress Search Engine Optimization (2015) book, referred to it as "the granddaddy of all SEO plugins". Brian Santo, editor of EE Times, uses Yoast for estimating the ranking of articles on Google by using analysis results (e.g. keyphrase, keyword density, links, readability), but criticizes the negative effects SEO has had on journalism and suggests Google use more human or artificial intelligence to improve search.

== Sponsorship ==
In September 2020, Yoast announced it became the main sponsor of a professional basketball club Yoast United, which plays in the BNXT League.

== See also ==
- Akismet
- Automattic
- Elementor
- WP Engine
