= Roel van Overbeek =

Dutch basketball player (born 2000)

No. 1 – ZZ Leiden
- Position: Shooting guard
- League: BNXT League

Personal information
- Born: 7 August 2000 (age 26) Oirschot, Netherlands
- Listed height: 188 cm (6 ft 2 in)

Career information
- Playing career: 2016–present

Career history
- 2016–2018: BAL
- 2018–2019: Dutch Windmills
- 2019–2022: BAL
- 2022–2024: Landstede Hammers
- 2024–2025: Yoast United
- 2025–2026: BAL
- 2026–present: ZZ Leiden

Career highlights
- Dutch Cup champion (2021)

Roel van Overbeek (born 7 August 2000) is a Dutch basketball player for ZZ Leiden of the BNXT League. Standing at 188 cm (6 ft 2 in), he plays as point guard.

== Professional career ==
Born in Oirschot, van Overbeek played for the Basketball Academie Limburg (BAL) youth academy. He made his debut in the Dutch Basketball League (DBL) in the 2016–17 season.

In the 2018–19 season, Van Overbeek played with newly established club Dutch Windmills. The team was declared bankrupt halfway through the season, however.

In the 2019–20 season, he returned to BAL and became the starting point guard for the team, leading them in assists. In the 2020–21 season, van Overbeek reached the DBL Playoffs for the first time. On 2 May 2021, he surprisingly won the DBL Cup with BAL after defeating Yoast United in the final. Van Overbeek had 13 points and 7 assists in the championship game.

On 11 June 2022, Van Overbeek signed with Landstede Hammers.

On June 20, 2024, he signed with QSTA United of the BNXT League.

On June 20, 2025, he signed with BAL of the BNXT League.

On July 13, 2026, he signed with ZZ Leiden of the BNXT League.

== National team career ==
Van Overbeek played with the Netherlands U16, U18 and U20 teams.
