= Evan Taylor (basketball) =

American basketball player

Personal information
- Born: July 5, 2001 (age 25) Glen Ellyn, Illinois, U.S.
- Listed height: 6 ft 6 in (1.98 m)

Career information
- College: Lehigh (2019–2023); Vanderbilt (2023–2024)
- Playing career: 2024–present
- Position: Small forward
- Number: 5

Career history
- 2024–2025: QSTA United
- 2025–2026: Donar

Career highlights
- Dutch Cup winner (2026)

Evan Taylor (born July 5, 2001) is an American professional basketball player who last played for Donar in the BNXT League and ENBL.

== Professional career ==
Evan Taylor started his professional career with QSTA United, playing in the Dutch BNXT League. Despite personally achieving an average of 16,6 points, 5,7 rebounds and 2 assist a game, the team got demoted that year.

In 2025 he accepted an offer from Donar Groningen, which also plays in the BNXT League, but also plays in the European competition the ENBL. With Donar he won the Dutch Cup, achieving the first prize of his career.
