= Mike Osepa =

Dutch basketball player

Free agent
- Position: Shooting guard

Personal information
- Born: 7 March 1991 (age 35) Willemstad, Curaçao
- Listed height: 1.91 m (6 ft 3 in)
- Listed weight: 88 kg (194 lb)

Career information
- High school: Subiaco Academy (Subiaco, Arkansas)
- College: Rockhurst (2011–2015)
- NBA draft: 2016: undrafted
- Playing career: 2020–present

Career history
- 2020–2021: Almere Sailors

Michael Osepa (born 7 March 1991) is a Dutch basketball player who last played for Almere Sailors of the BNXT League. He was born on Curaçao and moved to the United States to play basketball. Standing at 1.91 m (6 ft 3 in), he plays as shooting guard.

== Career ==
After playing college basketball for Rockhurst University in the NCAA Division II, Osepa moved to the Netherlands where he played for amateur clubs Almere Pioneers and Landslake Lions.

In September 2020, Osepa signed a contract with newly found club Almere Sailors. In the 2020–21 Dutch Basketball League, he captained Almere and averaged 8.0 points per game. On 14 July 2021, he extended his contract with the team for one more year. Later, it was announced that the Sailors withdrew and became inactive due to financial problems.
