= Almere Sailors =

Dutch basketball club

- Founded: 16 July 2020; 4 years ago
- Dissolved: 13 October 2021; 3 years ago
- History: Almere Sailors; 2020–2021
- Arena: Topsportcentrum Almere
- Capacity: 3,000
- Location: Almere, Netherlands
- Main sponsor: Flevo Makelaars
- President: Rinus Balvert
- Head coach: Gregory Tjin-A-Koeng
- Website: almeresailors.nl
Home	Away

Almere Sailors was a Dutch basketball club based in Almere. Established in 2020, the team played one season in the Dutch Basketball League (DBL), the highest level of basketball in the Netherlands. Home games are played in the Topsportcentrum Almere, which has a capacity of 3,000 people. A year later, the team left the league due to financial difficulties and filed for bankruptcy a few months later.

== History ==
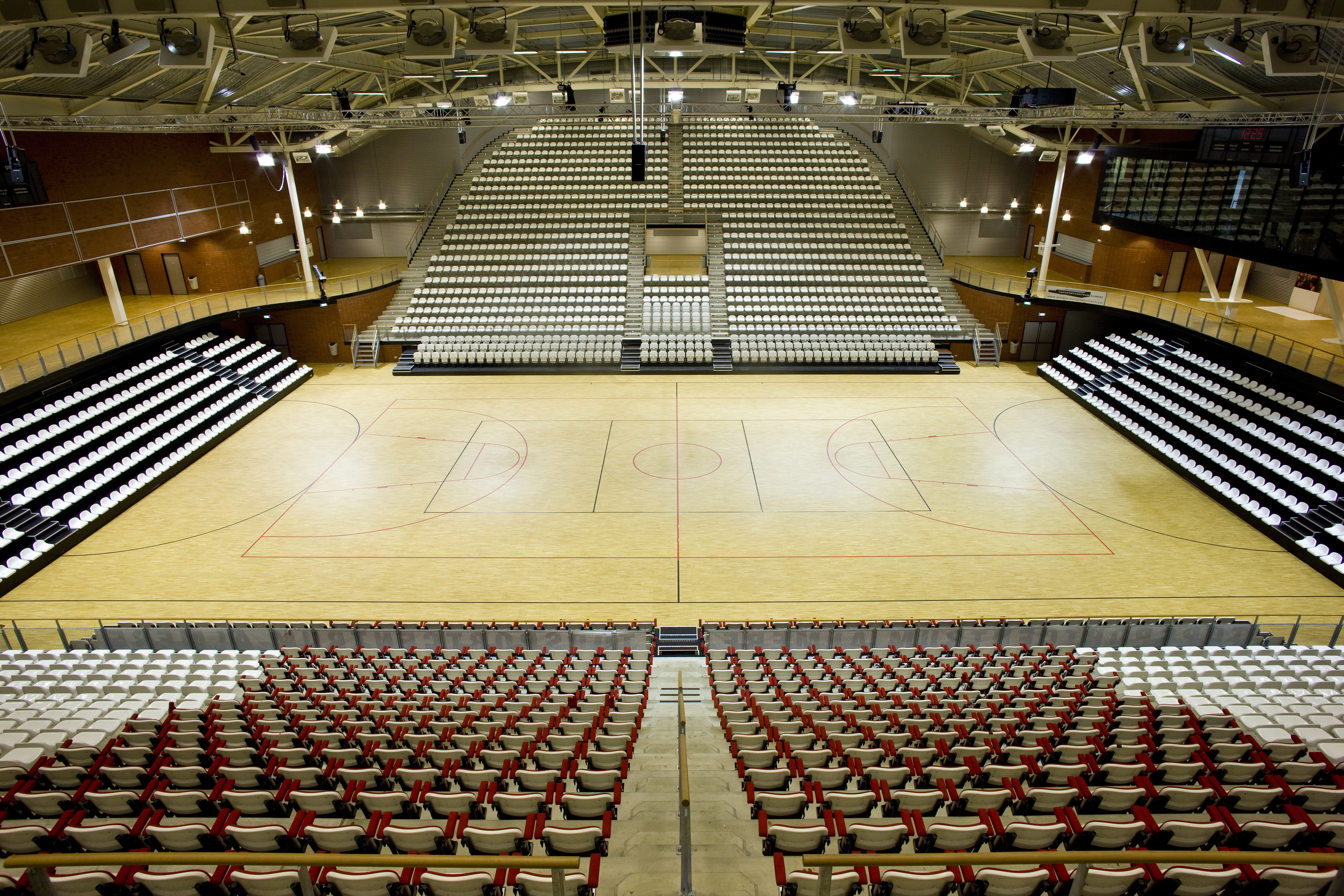
The Topsportcentrum, home arena of the Sailors

In July 2020, the Almere Pioneers announced their plans to enter the Dutch Basketball League (DBL). Due to the COVID-19 pandemic, entry requirements for the league were eased. Since its disappearance in the 2006–07 season, Almere had not played at the highest level. To separate its activities from the amateur club Pioneers, a new organisation was established. On 3 August, the name Almere Sailors was announced for the professional team. The name was chosen as the city of Almere was created after reclaiming land from the sea.

On 13 August, the Sailors announced Eric Kropf as their first head coach. On 27 August, the DBL announced the Sailors obtained a license for the 2020–21 season. On 16 September, the Sailors signed their first player in Papito Hersisia. The Sailors played their first ever DBL game on 3 October, losing 124–64 to power house Donar. The season was suspended and later resumed behind closed doors because of the ongoing pandemic. On 21 January 2021, the Sailors won their first ever DBL game against Apollo Amsterdam, 74–64 after overtime. Kropf was fired on 10 March 2021, assistant Gregory Tjin-A-Koeng was promoted to interim head coach.

In the 2021–22 season, the Sailors applied to play in the BNXT League, in which the national leagues of Belgium and the Netherlands have been merged. Tjin-a-Koeng remained as head coach. On 12 August 2021, the club however announced it decided not to join the new season due to the lack of necessary financial means.

A few months later, on 13 October 2021, the Almere Sailors organisation was declared bankrupt.

== Players ==
=== Last roster ===
The following was the Sailors roster that played in the 2020–21 Dutch Basketball League:

Almere Sailors roster
Players
Coaches

Pos.	No.	Nat.	Name	Ht.	Age
PG	4	(Netherlands)	van de Weijenberg, Brian	1.83 m (6 ft 0 in)	28 – 24 December 1996
G	5	(Netherlands)	Veltman, Dolf	1.87 m (6 ft 2 in)	24 – 12 December 2000
SG	6	(United States)	Lombardi, Dante	1.83 m (6 ft 0 in)	29 – 27 February 1996
SG	7	(Netherlands)	Richmond, Edwin	1.84 m (6 ft 0 in)	28 – 19 August 1996
G	8	(Netherlands)	Osepa, Mike (C)	1.91 m (6 ft 3 in)	34 – 7 March 1991
F	9	(Netherlands)	Kayhan, Job	2.02 m (6 ft 8 in)	24 – 23 December 2000
F	12	(Netherlands)	Knepa, Marnexson	1.98 m (6 ft 6 in)	29 – 19 March 1996
C	13	(Netherlands)	Hersisia, Papito	2.00 m (6 ft 7 in)	34 – 12 October 1990
F	14	(Netherlands)	Olijfveld, Livadjo	1.97 m (6 ft 6 in)	25 – 28 February 2000
C	15	(United States)	Joyce, Eamonn	2.08 m (6 ft 10 in)	29 – 17 May 1995
G	16	(Netherlands)	Sage, Esebio	1.84 m (6 ft 0 in)	28 – 13 June 1996
F	18	(Netherlands)	Pot, Ruben	2.00 m (6 ft 7 in)	23 – 6 September 2001

Head coach

- (Netherlands) Gregory Tjin-A-Koeng

Assistant coach(es)

- (Netherlands) Timothy Donk

Legend

- (C) Team captain
- Injured

- Roster
Updated: 11 December 2020

Note: Flags indicate national team eligibility at FIBA-sanctioned events. Players may hold other non-FIBA nationalities not displayed.

=== Top scorers by season ===
The following players were the leading scorers for the Sailors in each DBL season:

Season	Name	PPG
2020–21	(United States) Dante Lombardi	16.2

== Season by season ==
Season	Tier	League	Regular season					Playoffs	NBB Cup	Head coach
Season	Tier	League	Finish	Played	Wins	Losses	Win%	Playoffs	NBB Cup	Head coach
Almere Sailors
2020–21	1	DBL	12th	21	3	18	0.143	DNQ	First Round	Eric Kropf; Gregory Tjin-A-Koeng

== Sponsorship ==
Period	Kit manufacturer	Shirt sponsor	Ref.
2020–	Erreà	Flevo Makelaars	

== Head coaches ==
Name	Nationality	Tenure
Eric Kropf	Netherlands	13 August 2020 – 10 March 2021
Gregory Tjin-A-Koeng	Netherlands	10 March 2021 – 31 May 2021
