= The Hague Royals =

Dutch basketball club

- Founded: May 2020
- Dissolved: September 2023
- History: The Hague Royals; 2020–2023
- Arena: Sportcampus Zuiderpark
- Capacity: 3,500
- Location: The Hague, Netherlands
- Chairman: Mart Waterval
- Head coach: Bert Samson
- Team captain: Deividas Kumelis
- 2021–22 position: BNXT League, 21nd of 21
- Website: thehagueroyals.nl
Home	Away

The Hague Royals were a Dutch basketball club based in The Hague. Established in 2020, the team played in the highest level of basketball in the Netherlands for two seasons. Home games are played in the Sportcampus Zuiderpark, which has a capacity of 3,500 people.

The Royals played in the 2020–21 and 2021–22 seasons of the Dutch Basketball League (DBL) and later the BNXT League, the top flight divisions of Dutch basketball. They were denied a license in 2022 for the following season. After trying to revive the club, the Royals decided to dissolve the club in 2023.

== History ==
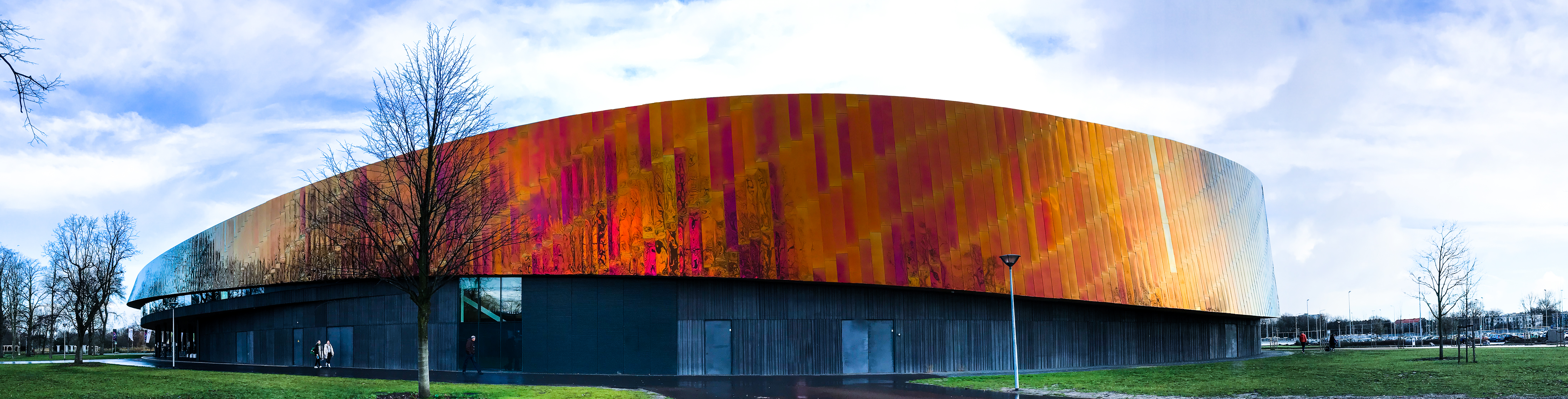
The home arena Sportcampus Zuiderpark

Before the establishment of the Royals, the last time a professional basketball team played at the highest level was C3 Cobra's the 2000–01 season. In May 2020, The Hague Royals announced its plans to play in the Dutch Basketball League (DBL) starting from the 2020–21 season. The name Royals comes from the reputation of The Hague as the Hofstad, where the Dutch royal family is seated.

On 20 June 2020, Bert Samson was announced as the first head coach of the Royals. On 10 August, the Royals signed Sam van Dijk as its first player ever. On 27 August, the DBL granted the club a license for the 2020–21 season. On 3 October, the Royals played their first ever DBL game, losing away against Aris Leeuwarden, 63–81.

In the 2021–22 season, the Royals played in the BNXT League, in which the national leagues of Belgium and the Netherlands have been merged. The Royals ended 21st out of the 21 teams with one victory in the season. The Royals failed to obtain a club licence for the 2022–23 season, the club appealed the decision but without success.

During the 2022–23 season, the club went into hiatus while the organisation aimed for a comeback the next season. In September 2023, the board announced the dissolution of the club after their application for a license in the 2023–24 season was once again rejected by the BNXT League.

== Players ==
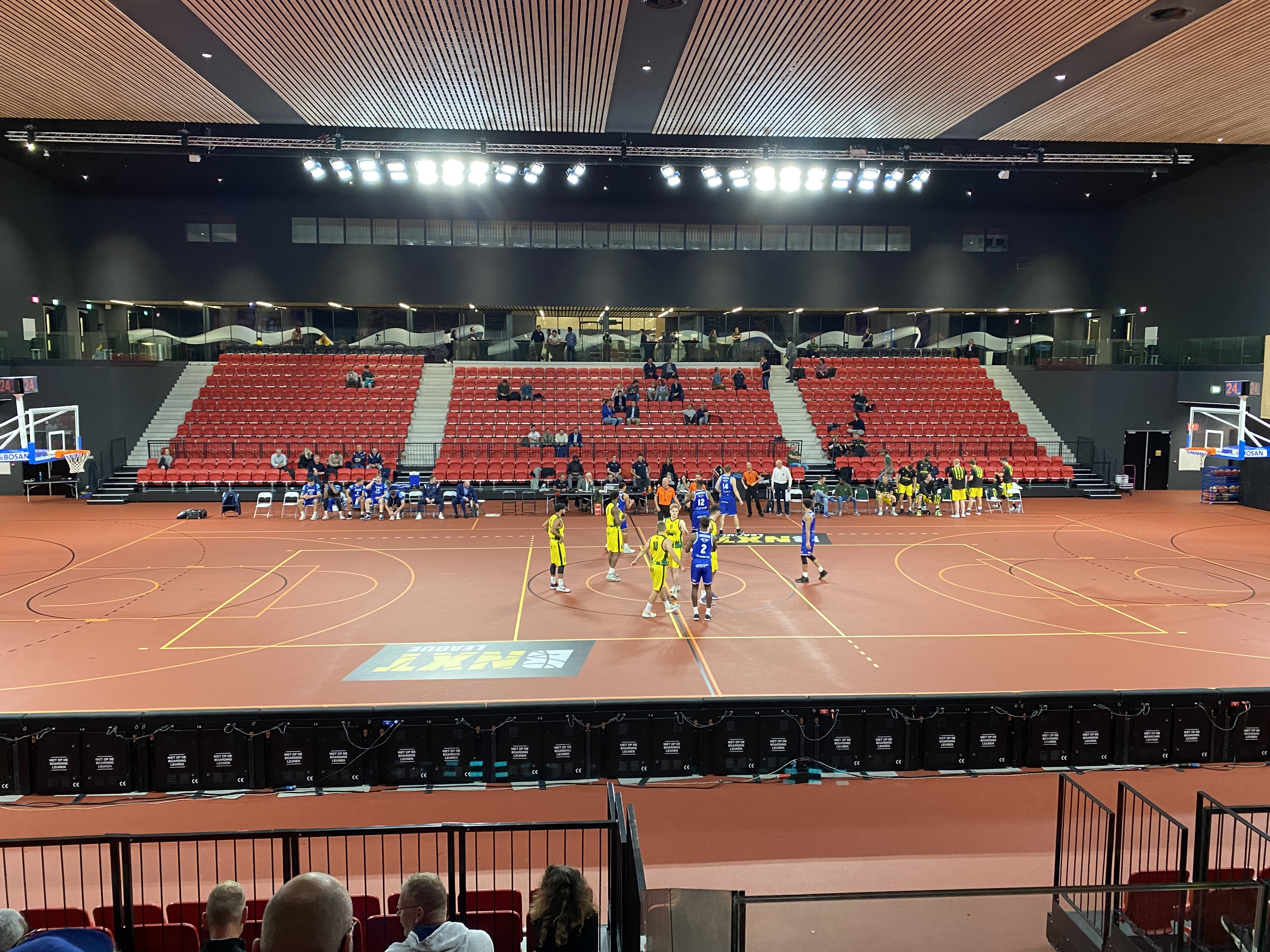
The Royals playing Donar in the 2021–22 season

=== Final roster ===
The following was the Royals’ final roster in the 2021–22 season.

The Hague Royals roster
Players
Coaches

Pos.	No.	Nat.	Name	Ht.	Age
G	0	(Netherlands)	Samson, Skip	1.95 m (6 ft 5 in)	30 – 31 December 1995
SG	3	(Netherlands)	Lopes, Casey	1.90 m (6 ft 3 in)	29 – 30 January 1997
PF/C	4	(United States)	Camaj, Arben	2.06 m (6 ft 9 in)
PG	9	(Netherlands)	van der Salm, Rick	1.85 m (6 ft 1 in)	25 – 28 July 2000
PG	10	(Lithuania)	Kumelis, Deividas	1.90 m (6 ft 3 in)	30 – 6 May 1995
PF	12	(Netherlands)	Knepa, Marnexson	1.98 m (6 ft 6 in)	29 – 19 March 1996
PF	15	(Netherlands)	Ackermans, Tom	1.98 m (6 ft 6 in)	25 – 5 August 2000
C	16	(Netherlands)	Alkema, Vincent	2.16 m (7 ft 1 in)	26 – 1 January 2000
SF	22	(Poland)	Pandura, Piotr	1.98 m (6 ft 6 in)	31 – 15 February 1995
SG	27	(Netherlands)	te Velde, Jens	1.93 m (6 ft 4 in)	31 – 15 February 1995
SG	33	(Iceland)	Vignisson, Snorri	1.94 m (6 ft 4 in)	28 – 22 April 1997

Head coach

- (Netherlands) Bert Samson

Team manager

- (Netherlands) Edgar da Costa

Legend

- (C) Team captain
- Injured

- Roster
- Transactions
Updated: 2021-10-05

Note: Flags indicate national team eligibility at FIBA-sanctioned events. Players may hold other non-FIBA nationalities not displayed.

=== Depth chart ===
Pos.	Starting 5	Bench 1	Bench 2
C	Arben Camaj	Vincent Alkema
PF	Bryce Smith	Marnexson Knepa
SF	Tom Ackermans	Piotr Pandura
SG	Jens te Velde	Casey Lopes
PG	Deividas Kumelis	Skip Samson	Rick van der Salm

=== Notable players ===
Note: Flags indicate national team eligibility at FIBA-sanctioned events. Players may hold other non-FIBA nationalities not displayed.

Criteria

To appear in this section a player must have either:

- Set a club record or won an individual award while at the club
- Played at least one official international match for their national team at any time
- Played at least one official NBA match at any time.

- (Democratic Republic of the Congo) Eric Kibi (1 season: 2020–21)

== Season by season ==
Season	Tier	League	Regular season					Playoffs	Dutch Cup	Head coach
Season	Tier	League	Finish	Played	Wins	Losses	Win%	Playoffs	Dutch Cup	Head coach
The Hague Royals
2020–21	1	DBL	10th	21	6	15	.286	DNQ	Quarter-finalist	Bert Samson
2021–22	1	BNXT	21st	30	1	29	.033	DNQ	Quarter-finalist	Bert Samson
Overall				51	7	44	.137			

== Sponsorship ==
Period	Kit manufacturer	Shirt sponsor	Ref.
2020–2021	Burned	None	
2021–2022	Majr	None	

== Head coaches ==
Period	Head coach
2020–2022	(Netherlands) Bert Samson
