= Bolden Brace =

American professional basketball player

Northeastern Huskies
- Title: Graduate assistant
- League: Colonial Athletic Association

Personal information
- Born: October 20, 1997 (age 29) Santa Barbara, California
- Listed height: 6 ft 6 in (1.98 m)
- Listed weight: 225 lb (102 kg)

Career information
- High school: Santa Barbara (Santa Barbara, California)
- College: Northeastern (2016–2020)
- NBA draft: 2020: undrafted
- Playing career: 2020–2021
- Position: Small forward
- Coaching career: 2021–present

Career history

Playing
- 2020–2021: Den Helder Suns

Coaching
- 2021–present: Northeastern (graduate assistant)

Career highlights
- DBL steals leader (2021); CAA Sixth Man of the Year (2018)

Bolden Brace (born October 20, 1997) is an American basketball coach and former professional basketball player. He played college basketball for Northeastern.

== Early life ==
Brace was born at Santa Barbara Cottage Hospital in 1997. He began playing basketball in kindergarten at George Ben Page Youth Center, continuing until eighth grade. He also played volleyball growing up. Brace attended Santa Barbara High School, where he was coached by David Bregante. Brace served as the sixth man on the team as a sophomore. As a senior, he led the team to win the CIF Southern Section basketball title. Brace averaged 20.4 points, 7.5 assists, and 6.5 rebounds per game, earning CIF 2A Division Player of Year honors. Brace played AAU basketball for Los Angeles Rockfish. He committed to Northeastern, the first school to offer him a scholarship, over six other schools.

== College career ==
On February 23, 2017, Brace made a school-record 10 3-pointers and scored a career-high 40 points in a 105–104 double overtime win against Elon. He primarily came off the bench as a freshman and averaged 7.5 points and 3.3 rebounds per game. As a sophomore, Brace averaged 7.9 points, 4.7 rebounds, and 2.2 assists per game. He was named the Colonial Athletic Association Sixth Man of the Year. Brace started 34 games as a junior, averaging 9.9 points, 6.1 rebounds, and 2.7 assists per game. As a senior, Brace averaged 10.6 points and 6.6 rebounds per game, shooting 38.8 percent from three-point range.

== Professional career ==
On August 23, 2020, Brace signed his first professional contract with Den Helder Suns of the Dutch Basketball League (DBL). He scored a season high 23 points against Donar Groningen on April 17, 2021. Brace averaged 13 points, 4.8 rebounds, and 2.4 steals per game.

== Coaching career ==
In August 2021, Brace joined Bill Coen's staff at Northeastern as a graduate assistant.

== Personal life ==
Brace is the son of Billy and Meredith Brace. His father played linebacker on the football team at Santa Barbara High School, while his mother played volleyball for the high school. Brace is a fan of Stephen Curry. His girlfriend, Matti Hartman, played hockey at Northeastern.
