= Eric Kibi =

Congolese-Canadian basketball player

Personal information
- Born: 4 August 1990 (age 36) Quebec City, Quebec
- Listed height: 198 cm (6 ft 6 in)
- Listed weight: 100 kg (220 lb)

Career information
- High school: Sandia (Albuquerque, New Mexico)
- College: Jacksonville College (2008–2010); Little Rock (2010–2011); Abilene Christian (2011–2012)
- NBA draft: 2012: undrafted
- Playing career: 2012–present
- Position: Forward

Career history
- 2012–2013: BG Halstenbek Pinneberg
- 2013–2014: Ottawa SkyHawks
- 2014–2015: BC Rendsburg
- 2016: Hertener Löwen
- 2015: KK Stršljen
- 2015–2016: London Lightning
- 2016–2017: Randers Cimbria
- 2017–2018: L'Hospitalet
- 2018–2019: GET Vosges
- 2018: Handlová
- 2019: Al-Mina'a
- 2019: Saskatchewan Rattlers
- 2019–2020: Libertad
- 2020: Ottawa Blackjacks
- 2020–2021: The Hague Royals
- 2021: Ottawa Blackjacks
- 2022–2023: Colegio Los Leones de Quilpué

Career highlights
- CEBL champion (2019)
Medals
Men's basketball
Representing Democratic Republic of the Congo
AfroCan
| Gold medal – first place | 2019 | National team |

Eric Mania Kibi (born 4 August 1990) is a Congolese-Canadian basketball player for Colegio Los Leones de Quilpué. Standing at 198 cm (6 ft 6 in), he plays as small forward or power forward. He has been a member of the DR Congo men's national basketball team and is currently not under contract.

== Early life ==
Kibi was born in Quebec City, Canada to Congolese parents.

== Professional career ==
In January 2019, Kibi signed in Iraq with Al-Mina'a. On 20 March 2020, Kibi signed with the Ottawa Blackjacks for a second CEBL season.

On 11 September 2020, Kibi signed with The Hague Royals of the Dutch Basketball League (DBL).

On 28 May 2021, Kibi returned to the Ottawa Blackjacks.

== National team career ==
Internationally, Kibi represents the DR Congo national basketball team. He helped his country win the gold medal at FIBA AfroCan 2019. Kibi was also on the roster for AfroBasket 2021, coming off the bench for 2.7 points per game.

== Honours ==
=== Club ===
Saskatchewan Rattlers

- Canadian Elite Basketball League: 2019

=== National team ===
DR Congo

- AfroCan: 2019 (gold) Gold medal
