= Andrés Ibargüen (basketball) =

Colombian-American basketball player

No. 19 – Boca Juniors
- Position: Power forward / center
- League: Liga Nacional de Baloncesto

Personal information
- Born: 14 February 1996 (age 30) Santa Marta, Colombia
- Listed height: 2.00 m (6 ft 7 in)
- Listed weight: 109 kg (240 lb)

Career information
- College: Trinity Valley CC (2016–2018); UT Arlington (2018–2019); Angelo State (2019–2020)
- NBA draft: 2020: undrafted
- Playing career: 2020–present

Career history
- 2020–2021: Yoast United
- 2021–2022: Prat
- 2023: Club Trouville
- 2023: Flamengo
- 2023-2024: Riachuelo
- 2024–present: Boca Juniors

Andrés Felipe Ibargüen Andrews (born 14 February 1996) is a Colombian-American basketball player who plays for Boca Juniors and for the Colombia national team. Standing at 2.00 m (6 ft 6 1/2 in), he plays as power forward or center.

== College career ==
Ibargüen played his two seasons at Trinity Valley Community College. He transferred to UT Arlington but sat out the first six games as the NCAA reviewed his eligibility. Ibargüen averaged 6.6 points per game as a junior at UT Arlington. As a senior at Angelo State, Ibargüen tallied 13 double doubles and averaged 14.3 points and 10.4 rebounds per game. He was selected to the All-Texas Division II Team.

== Professional career ==
On 28 August 2020, Ibargüen signed his first contract with Basketball Community Gelderland of the Dutch Basketball League (DBL). The team was later renamed Yoast United. Ibargüen and United reached the final of the 2021 DBL Cup, in which Ibargüen scored a game-high 39 points and 13 rebounds. However, in the end the team lost to BAL by ten points.

In December 2022, Ibarguën was confirmed to have joined Club Trouville for the 2023 season of the Uruguayan Basketball League. He averaged 19 points and 8 rebounds over the LUB season.

On 4 April 2023, Brazilian club Flamengo announced Ibarguën had signed a contract for the Final Four of the Basketball Champions League Americas (BCLA). He replaced the injured Vítor Faverani.

In July 2023, he joined Club Atlético Riachuelo of the Argentinian Liga Nacional.

== National team career ==
With the Colombia national basketball team, Ibargüen played at the 2016 South American Basketball Championship.
