= United Basketball =

Dutch basketball club

GET United
- Leagues: Promotiedivisie
- Founded: May 2020; 6 years ago
- Arena: De Kooi
- Capacity: 650
- Location: Bemmel, Netherlands
- Main sponsor: QSTA
- President: Sjang van de Wiel
- Head coach: Patrick Kaas
- Championships: 1 Dutch Second Division
- Website: www.qstaunited.nl//
Home	Away

United Basketball, for sponsorship reasons known as GET United, is a Dutch basketball club based in Bemmel, Gelderland. Established in 2020, the team plays in the Promotiedivisie, after being relegated from the BNXT League following the 2024–25 season. Home games are played at De Kooi, which has a capacity of 650 people.

== History ==
The organization was founded in May 2020 under the temporary name of Basketball Community Gelderland with the aim of bringing back professional basketball to the province of Gelderland. Since the folding of Matrixx Magixx in 2014, the province had been without a club in the first-tier Dutch Basketball League (DBL).

On 5 August, the club announced it was taking the step to the DBL and had acquired a provisional license for the 2020–21 season. On 9 August, the club announced Matthew Otten as its first head coach. On 13 August, the club signed its first player in American Kaleb Warner. Yoast SEO signed a three-year contract to become main sponsor of the team, which was named Yoast United for its inaugural season. On 4 October, 2021, Yoast United won its first-ever DBL game away against BAL Weert, 91–59.

United had an incredible 2021 Dutch Cup campaign in its debut season. It defeated favored Donar and Landstede Hammers in the quarter- and semifinals. Point guard Austin Luke, also assists leader of the DBL, led the team with 52 points in the semifinal that was won after overtime. In the final, Yoast lost to eight-seeded BAL.

Starting from the 2021–22 season, United plays in the BNXT League, in which the national leagues of Belgium and the Netherlands are combined. Head coach Otten signed with Donar Groningen, and Paul Vervaeck signed a 2-year contract to become his successor.

In June 2024, United announced it had signed a sponsorship agreement with QSTA and will be named QSTA United starting from the 2024–25 season. That season, United finished in the last place and was officially relegated from the league, and then opted to play in the second-level Promotiedivisie starting from 2025–26.

For the 2025–26 season, the club name was changed again to GET United. Despite their dominant season in the Promotiedivisie, the club announced they wouldn't apply for a BNXT license for the 2026–27 season. They cited their inability to maintain a stable financial situation in case of promotion and their preferred focus on the female and youth teams as a reason not to apply. The club won their first Dutch Second Division title, by defeating Apollo Amsterdam in the Promotiedivisie final by 83-72.

== Arena ==
Yoast United plays its games at Sportcentrum De Kooi, which had been used by amateur club Batouwe Basketball before as well. With a capacity of 650 people, it is the smallest arena in the BNXT League.

== Players ==
=== Notable players ===
Note: Flags indicate national team eligibility at FIBA-sanctioned events. Players may hold other non-FIBA nationalities not displayed.

Criteria

To appear in this section a player must have either:

- Set a club record or won an individual award while at the club
- Played at least one official international match for their national team at any time
- Played at least one official NBA match at any time.

- (Colombia) Andrés Ibargüen (1 season: 2020–21)
- (United States) Austin Luke (1 season: 2020–21)

=== Individual awards ===
DBL All-Rookie Team

- Bob Berghuis – 2021

== Honours ==
DBL Cup

- Runners-up (1): 2021

Promotiedivisie

- Winners: 2025-26

== Season by season ==
Season	Tier	League	Pos.	NBB Cup
Yoast United
2020–21	1	DBL	7th	Runner-up
2021–22	1	BNXT League	NL 8th	Eightfinals
2021–22	1	BNXT League	BNXT 18th	Eightfinals
2022–23	1	BNXT League	NL 6th	Eightfinals
2022–23	1	BNXT League	BNXT 15th	Eightfinals
2023–24	1	BNXT League	NL 8th	Quarterfinals
2023–24	1	BNXT League	BNXT 18th	Quarterfinals
QSTA United
2024–25	1	BNXT League	NL 9th	Quarterfinals
2024–25	1	BNXT League	BNXT 19th	Quarterfinals
GET United
2025-26	2	Promotiedivisie	Champion	Eightfinals
2026–27	2	Promotiedivisie		First round

== Sponsorship ==
Period	Kit manufacturer	Shirt sponsor	Ref.
2020–2024	Jako	Yoast SEO	
2024–2025	Jako	QSTA	
2025–present	Jako	GET	

== Head coaches ==
Period	Head coach	Honours
2020–2021	(United States) Matthew Otten	
2021–2023	(Belgium) Paul Vervaeck	
2023–2026	(Netherlands) Jeroen van Vugt	1x Dutch Second Division
2026–present	(Netherlands) Patrick Kaas	
