= 2026–27 Promotiedivisie =

- League: Promotiedivisie
- Sport: Basketball
- Duration: 12 September 2026–17 April 2027 (Regular Season)
- Teams: 18

Seasons
- 2025–26 2027–28 →

The 2026–27 Promotiedivisie will be the 45th season of the Promotiedivisie, the second division of Dutch basketball.

The season starts on 12 September 2026 and is planned to end 17 April 2027.

GET United is the defending champion.

== Format ==
After the demotion of GET United the previous year, two further teams from the BNXT League joined the 26–27 Promotiedivisie. Both Den Helder Suns and BAL decided to voluntarily demote from the BNXT League due to financial reasons. This small exodus from the BNXT League prompted the Dutch basketball association to research the possibility to install a new league between the Promotiedivisie and the BNXT League. This new league, with the working title Men's Basketball League (MBL) is planned to start from the 2027–28 season. Therefore, the association decided to use the 26–27 Promotiedivisie as a test year to decide which teams would be ready to join the new MBL.

== Teams ==
There 2026–27 season consists of 18 teams.

From the BNXT League, Den Helder Suns and BAL demoted. They replace their respective MSE-II teams that were a part of the previous Promotiedivisie season. From the Eerste divisie, BV Amsterdam, Utrecht Bull's and BC Triple Threat promoted.

CobraNova demoted to the Eerste divisie. Arnhem Eagles decided to voluntarily pull back from the Promotiedivisie, due to many important players leaving the club.

Locations of the 2025–26 Promotiedivisie teams

Team	City
Apollo Amsterdam	Amsterdam
Attacus	Veghel
Basketball Academie Limburg	Weert
Biks Shots	Hilvarenbeek
BV Amsterdam	Amsterdam
Den Helder Suns	Den Helder
GET United	Bemmel
De Groene Uilen	Groningen
Hot Pepper Heat	Zwanenburg
Lokomotief	Rijswijk
MBCA	Amstelveen
Orange Lions Academy	Amsterdam
River Trotters	Hardinxveld-Giessendam
Triple Threat	Haarlem
Utrecht Basketball	Utrecht
Utrecht Bull's	Utrecht
Uitsmijters	Almelo
ZZ Leiden II	Leiden

== Regular season ==
For the regular season, the Promotiedivisie is split into 3 groups of each 6 teams for the first phase. These teams will play a round robin format, with a home and an away match against each opponent. After this first phase, number one and two of each group will qualify for the Elite A group in the second phase. The other 4 teams of each group will be put in the Elite B group. In this second phase, the clubs will play a round robin again to determine the places for the play-offs.

=== Phase 1 ===
==== Group A ====
Pos	Team	Pld	W	L	PF	PA	PD	Pts	Qualification	ATT	UBA	GET	GRO	BVA	BSL
1	Attacus	5	4	1	431	400	+31	8	Qualify for the Elite A	—	80–73	79–89	14 Nov	99–88	12 Dec
2	Utrecht Basketball	6	4	2	462	460	+2	8	Qualify for the Elite A	28 Nov	—	15 Nov	77–90	80–70	85–83
3	GET United	6	4	2	505	441	+64	8	Qualify for the Elite B	21 Nov	75–79	—	90–69	12 Dec	81–69
4	De Groene Uilen	5	3	2	384	388	−4	6	Qualify for the Elite B	19 Dec	12 Dec	80–75	—	80–70	21 Nov
5	BV Amsterdam	6	1	5	441	509	−68	2	Qualify for the Elite B	82–91	22 Nov	65–95	27 Nov	—	66–64
6	ZZ Leiden II	6	1	5	422	447	−25	2	Qualify for the Elite B	68–82	62–68	27 Nov	76–65	13 Nov	—

Source: https://www.basketballstats.nl/db/wedstrijd/stand.pl?
Legend: Blue = home team win; Red = away team win.

==== Group B ====
Pos	Team	Pld	W	L	PF	PA	PD	Pts	Qualification	DHS	HPH	RIV	LOK	UBU	OLA
1	Den Helder Suns	6	6	0	578	403	+175	12	Qualify for the Elite A	—	112–78	12 Dec	15 Nov	94–59	107–57
2	Hot Pepper Heat	6	5	1	577	497	+80	10	Qualify for the Elite A	21 Nov	—	101–84	104–94	12 Dec	96–70
3	River Trotters	5	3	2	441	349	+92	6	Qualify for the Elite B	75–85	28 Nov	—	103–55	14 Nov	83–41
4	Lokomotief	5	1	4	348	489	−141	2	Qualify for the Elite B	68–103	59–112	21 Nov	—	72–67	12 Dec
5	Utrecht Bull's	5	1	4	344	387	−43	2	Qualify for the Elite B	66–77	78–86	10 Oct	29 Nov	—	21 Nov
6	Orange Lions Academy	5	0	5	293	456	−163	0	Qualify for the Elite B	27 Nov	13 Nov	67–88	6 Nov	58–74	—

Source: https://www.basketballstats.nl/db/wedstrijd/stand.pl?
Legend: Blue = home team win; Red = away team win.

==== Group C ====
Pos	Team	Pld	W	L	PF	PA	PD	Pts	Qualification	BIK	TRI	UIT	APO	MBC	BAL
1	Biks Shots	6	4	2	504	446	+58	8	Qualify for the Elite A	—	12 Dec	96–74	94–66	21 Nov	75–73
2	Triple Threat	5	3	2	378	378	0	6	Qualify for the Elite A	85–79	—	29 Nov	54–81	92–78	14 Nov
3	Uitsmijters	5	3	2	374	376	−2	6	Qualify for the Elite B	14 Nov	TBD	—	52–61	12 Dec	85–75
4	Apollo Amsterdam	6	3	3	448	427	+21	6	Qualify for the Elite B	28 Nov	21 Nov	62–76	—	102–74	76–77
5	MBCA	6	3	3	481	510	−29	6	Qualify for the Elite B	89–85	79–70	82–87	14 Nov	—	29 Nov
6	BAL	6	1	5	419	467	−48	2	Qualify for the Elite B	59–75	61–77	21 Nov	12 Dec	74–79	—

Source: https://www.basketballstats.nl/db/wedstrijd/stand.pl?
Legend: Blue = home team win; Red = away team win.
