= 2026–27 Dutch Basketball Cup =

2026–27 Basketball Cup
- Association: Basketball Nederland
- Sport: Basketball
- Duration: 5 September 2026 – 27 March 2027

Seasons
- ← 2025–26 2027–28 →

The 2026–27 Basketball Cup, also known as the Dutch Basketball Cup, is the 59th season of the Netherlands' national basketball cup tournament. The preliminary round begins on 5 September 2026. The season will end with the Final on 27 March 2027.

Donar Groningen is the defending title holder, having won the 2025–26 season.

== Format ==
Teams playing in the Promotiedivisie or the BNXT League are obligated to participate in the cup competition. Clubs with teams on a lower level were allowed to enroll for the competition. These teams play a preliminary round on September 5 to determine which teams reach the first round. From the first round onwards, the Promotiedivisie teams participate. The BNXT League teams start in the eigthfinals.

== Preliminary round ==
Team 1	Score	Team 2
~~CobraNova MSE-3~~	0–20	NRG Basketball
GBI van Dijk Grasshoppers	127–52	Pigeons
UBV "The Eagles"	65–78	BC Deurne Pioniers
Celeritas-Donar	68–89	U.S.
ABC Amigos	104–138	Landstede Hammers MSE-2
~~BV Leeuwarden~~	0–20	SBV Juventus
CobraNova MSE-2	123–54	BC Heeze
BV Groningen MSE-2	57–73	Arnhem Eagles
Basketiers '71	20–0	~~Red Stars~~
~~BV Oaters Joure~~	0–20	Landslake Lions
~~Hot Pepper Heat MSE-3~~	0–20	BV Hoofddorp
Lokomotief MSE-2	67–76	MBCA A'veen MSE-2
BV Squirrels	74–108	Hot Pepper Heat MSE-2
CobraNova	72–130	Marathon
B.O.B.	75–80	De Dunckers
Agathos	53–70	Klipperstars
Heroes Den Bosch MSE-2	107–32	Rebound '73
High Five	83–58	Ceres
Fryslan Basketball	20–0	~~The Jugglers~~
BV Groningen	68–76	Trajanum
EVBV Octopus	85–44	BV Amsterdam MSE-2
~~D.B.V. Arriba~~	0–20	VBC Akrides
Crackerjacks	91–75	Almere Pioneers
BS Leiden MSE-3	54–47	LB-ZAC
Cady '73	20–0	~~BV Noordkop MSE-2~~
CBV Binnenland	68–67	The Black Eagles

- Teams with their names struck through have withdrawn from the tournament.

== First round ==
Team 1	Score	Team 2
Landstede Hammers MSE-2	66–81	Triple Threat
High Five	87–96	MBCA
Utrecht Bull's	56–50	BV Amsterdam
SBV Juventus	76–73	Hot Pepper Heat MSE-2
BC Deurne Pioneers	80–110	Trajanum
EVBV Octopus	50–102	BC Apollo
Basketiers '71	44–106	Basketball Academie Limburg
NRG Basketball	-	Fryslan Basketball
CobraNova MSE-2	78–87	U.S.
Arnhem Eagles	61–57	MBCA A'veen MSE-2
Heroes Den Bosch MSE-2	78–88	Orange Lions Academy
Cady '73	73–109	Biks Shots
Klipperstars	70–123	Marathon
De Groene Uilen	91–100	Hot Pepper Heat
BS Leiden MSE-3	68–100	Lokomotief Rijswijk
Attacus	93–74	ZZ Leiden MSE-2
GBI van Dijk Grasshoppers	69–64	River Trotters
Den Helder Suns	95–67	GET United
Landslake Lions	99–53	VBC Akrides
De Dunckers	48–79	Crackerjacks
CBV Binnenland	67–55	BV Hoofddorp
Utrecht Basketball	87–91	Uitsmijters

== Bracket ==
On 28 October the bracket was drawn. BNXT League team will only participate from the eighth-finals onwards. Although the path towards the finals has been laid out, whether teams play a home or away match in the later rounds will be determined in another, separate draw. Teams from a lower division will always play a home game against a higher league team.

Second round
U.S.
Trajanum
Utrecht Bull's
Biks Shots
Crackerjacks
Attacus
Orange Lions Academy
Uitsmijters
Marathon
Lokomotief Rijswijk
CBV Binnenland
MBCA
GBI van Dijk Grasshoppers
Triple Threat
SBV Juventus
Basketball Academie Limburg
Landslake Lions
BC Apollo
Arnhem Eagles
Den Helder Suns
NRG Basketball
Hot Pepper Heat

Eight-finals
Heroes Den Bosch
ZZ Leiden
Donar
Landstede Hammers
Rotterdam City Basketball

Quarter-finals

Semi-finals

Final
