= Yannick Kraag =

Dutch basketball player (born 2002)

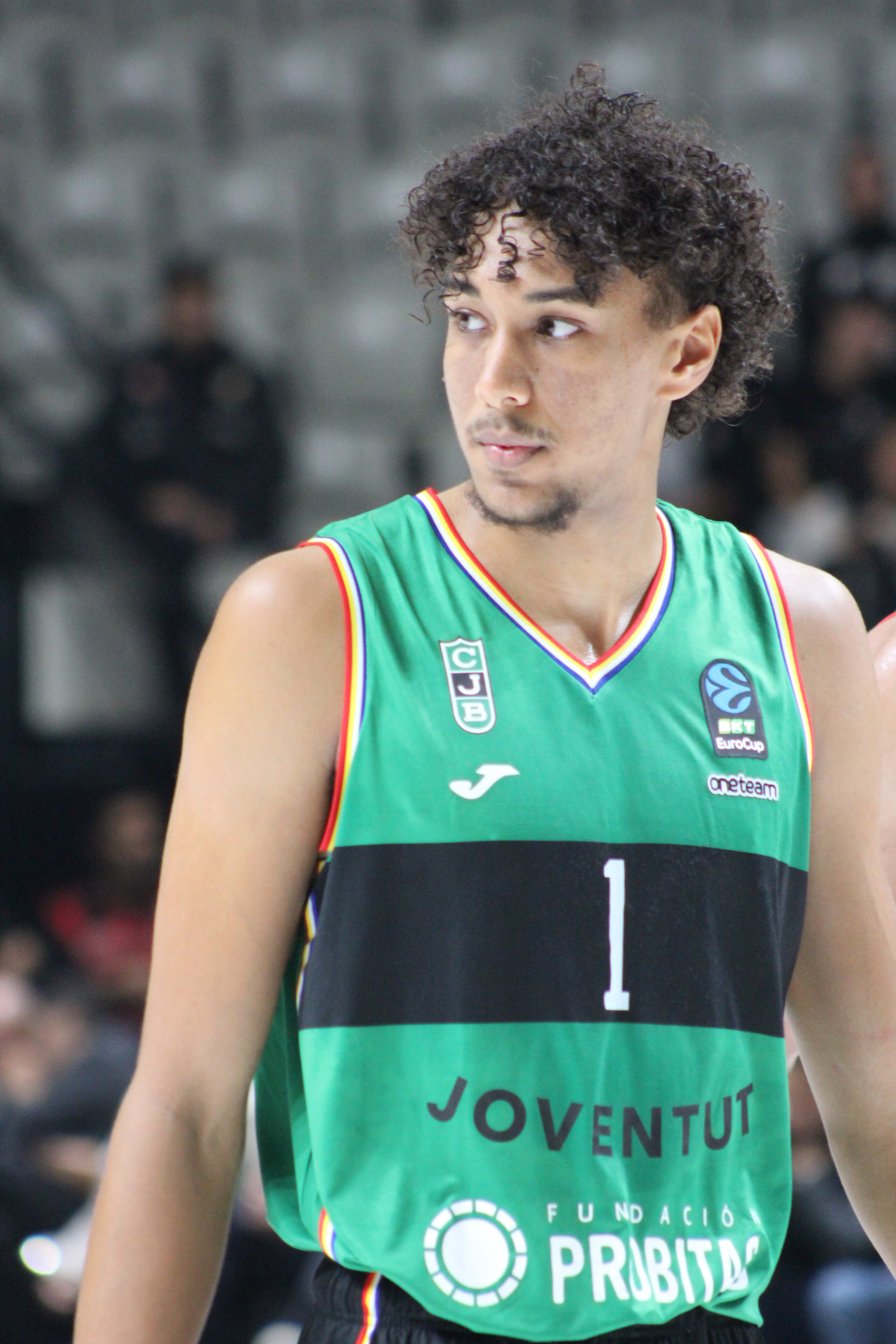
- Kraag with Joventut Badalona in 2024

No. 1 – Joventut Badalona
- Position: Shooting guard / small forward
- League: Liga ACB

Personal information
- Born: 16 October 2002 (age 24) Amsterdam, Netherlands
- Listed height: 2.02 m (6 ft 8 in)
- Listed weight: 94 kg (207 lb)

Career information
- High school: Orange Lions Academy (Amsterdam, Netherlands)
- Playing career: 2020–present

Career history
- 2020–2026: Joventut Badalona
- 2020–2022: →Prat
- 2026–present: Dubai Basketball
- 2026–present: →Joventut Badalona

Career highlights
- All-Liga ACB Young Team (2024); Spanish Supercup winner (2026)

Yannick Kraag (born 16 October 2002) is a Dutch basketball player for Joventut Badalona of the Spanish Liga ACB, on loan from Dubai Basketball. Standing at 2.02 m (6 ft 7 1/2 in), he plays as shooting guard or small forward. He also plays for the Netherlands national team.

== Early life ==
Born in Amsterdam, Kraag played for BC Triple Threat in his younger years and later for the Orange Lions Academy, the affiliated youth training programme of the national federation Basketball Nederland.

== Professional career ==
In 2019, Kraag signed with Spanish club Joventut Badalona. In his first year, he played in the U18 team of the club. During the 2020–21 season, he played for CB Prat in the LEB Oro. On 1 November, he made his debut for Joventut in a Liga ACB game against Estudiantes at age 18.

On 5 August 2026, Kraag signed with Dubai Basketball of the ABA League and the EuroLeague, and was immediately loaned to Joventut Badalona for the 2026–27 season.

== National team career ==
Kraag was selected for the Netherlands national basketball team as part of the roster for the EuroBasket 2022 qualifiers in November 2020.

On 12 November 2022, Kraag made his senior debut for the Netherlands senior team in a 77–96 home loss to Ukraine. He had 15 points and 7 rebounds as a starter.

== Personal life ==
He is the grandson of Lygia Kraag-Keteldijk, a Surinamese former politician.
