= 2025–26 Dutch Basketball Cup =

2025–26 Basketball Cup
- Association: Basketball Nederland
- Sport: Basketball
- Duration: 17 Oktober 2025 – 22 March 2026
- Season champions: Donar (8th title)
- Runners-up: Landstede Hammers
- Cup MVP: Damian Forrest

Seasons
- ← 2024–25 2026–27 →

The 2025–26 Basketball Cup, also known as the Dutch Basketball Cup, was the 58th season of the Netherlands' national basketball cup tournament. The first round began on 17 October 2025. The season will ended with the Final on 22 March 2026.

Heroes Den Bosch was the defending title holder, having won the 2024–25 season. They were unable to retain their title for a third year in a row, being defeated by Donar in the semi-finals.

The final was played by Donar and Landstede Hammers. It was their respective twelfth and seventh appearance in the final. Donar had already won the final 7 times before, whereas Landstede was still to earn their first title. Donar won the final 78–77, earning them an eighth title.

== Bracket ==
In the first two rounds, no professional teams participate and therefore consists of Promotiedivisie teams and under. In the third round, BNXT League teams joined the tournament.

Second round
Lokomotief Rijswijk | 90
Arnhem Eagles | 68
Cady '73 | 64
GET United | 101
CBV Binnenland | 84
BC Triple Threat | 97
BV Amsterdam | 73
CobraNova MSE-1 | 69
CobraNova MSE-2 | 74
Basketball Academy Utrecht | 102
Attacus | 89
ZZ Leiden MSE-2 | 63
Biks Shots | 74
River Trotters | 66
GBI van Dijk Grasshoppers | 58
Orange Lions Academy | 75

Eight-finals
Lokomotief Rijswijk | 68
Den Helder Suns | 93
GET United | 78
Rotterdam City Basketball | 81
BC Triple Threat | 58
ZZ Leiden | 99
BV Amsterdam | 70
Landstede Hammers | 100
Basketball Academy Utrecht | 68
Donar | 107
Attacus | 70
LWD Basket | 104
Biks Shots | 96
BAL | 89
Orange Lions Academy | 58
Heroes Den Bosch | 104

Quarter-finals
Den Helder Suns | 87
Rotterdam City Basketball | 75
ZZ Leiden | 67
Landstede Hammers | 101
Donar | 109
LWD Basket | 99
Biks Shots | 58
Heroes Den Bosch | 100

Semi-finals
Den Helder Suns | 68
Landstede Hammers | 72
Donar | 90
Heroes Den Bosch | 68

Final
Landstede Hammers | 77
Donar | 78
