= 2022–23 Dutch Basketball Cup =

2022–23 Basketball Cup
- Association: Basketball Nederland
- Sport: Basketball
- Duration: 3 December 2022 – 12 March 2023
- Season champions: ZZ Leiden (4th title)
- Runners-up: Landstede Hammers

Seasons
- ← 2021–22 2023–24 →

The 2022–23 Basketball Cup, also known as the Dutch Basketball Cup, was the 55th season of the Netherlands' national basketball cup tournament. The preliminary rounds began on 3 September 2022, while the first round began on 22 October 2022. The season ended with the final on 12 March 2023 at the Landstede Sportcentrum.

Donar was the defending title holder, having won the 2021–22 season. ZZ Leiden won their fourth Cup title after winning the final over Landstede Hammers, who lost their record fifth Cup final.

== Bracket ==
The Den Helder Suns withdrew in the eight-finals because it was unable to field a team due to injuries. The draw for the quarter-finals was held on 13 December 2022 and the final was played on 12 March 2023. The venue of the final was Landstede Sportcentrum, after another draw was held to determine this.

Eight-finals
3 December – Groningen
De Groene Uilen	60
Apollo Amsterdam	92
3 December – Rotterdam
Feyenoord Basketball	61
BAL	40
1 December – Rijswijk
Lokomotief Rijswijk	20
Den Helder Suns	0
2 December – Bemmel
Yoast United	80
Landstede Hammers	89
4 December – Utrecht
Utrecht Basketball	58
Heroes Den Bosch	111
3 December – Den Helder
Den Helder Suns 2	63
Donar	93
3 December – Veghel
Attacus	67
Aris Leeuwarden	94
1 December – Rijswijk
Lokomotief Rijswijk 2	46
ZZ Leiden	109

Quarter-finals
17 & 19 December
Apollo Amsterdam	56	68	124
Feyenoord Basketball	78	90	168
17 December – Rijswijk
Lokomotief Rijswijk	75
Landstede Hammers	84
23 December & 12 January
Heroes Den Bosch	66	50	116
Donar	64	72	136
18 & December
Aris Leeuwarden	74	66	140
ZZ Leiden	83	100	183

Semi-finals
20 & 22 January
Feyenoord Basketball	47	69	116
Landstede Hammers	62	69	131
Donar	68	63	131
ZZ Leiden	63	76	139

Final
12 March
Landstede Hammers	70
ZZ Leiden	72

== Final ==
12 March 2023 Final	Landstede Hammers	70–72	ZZ Leiden	Zwolle
16:00	Scoring by quarter: 19–19, 16–21, 18–13, 17–19
	Pts: Duje Dukan 18; Rebs: Arnaldo Toro Barea 10; Asts: Felix Terins 6 Eff: Duje Dukan 24	Boxscore	Pts: Maarten Bouwknecht 19; Rebs: Luuk van Bree 7 Asts: David Collins 4 Eff: Maarten Bouwknecht 15	Arena: Landstede Sportcentrum; Attendance: 1,200; Referees: Tijmen Last, Nico Zwiep, Maurits Witvliet
