= Gido Nanninga =

Dutch basketball player

No. 20 – De Groene Uilen
- Position: Forward
- League: BNXT League

Personal information
- Born: August 11, 2006 (age 20)
- Listed height: 6 ft 9 in (2.06 m)

Career information
- Playing career: 2025–present

Career history
- 2025–2026: Donar
- 2025–2026: → BAL
- 2026–2027: De Groene Uilen

Gido Nanninga (born August 11, 2006) is a Dutch basketball player for De Groene Uilen in the Promotiedivisie.

== Early life and career ==
Nanninga was part of the Donar Groningen youth acamdemy from 2021 until 2023. In 2023 he made a step to the EWE Baskets Juniors for a year, before returning to Donar in 2024. There, in his last year in the U19 of Donar, he led his team to the 2025 U19 Dutch championship by scoring 27 points in the final.

== Professional career ==
Nanninga started his career in 2025 with Donar after coming up through its youth academy. He made his debut against Rotterdam City Basketball, recording 0 points and 1 rebound. Due to his lack of minutes, he was loaned out to BAL on the 10th of December 2025. There, he played an average of 8.5 minutes in 22 games. He scored an average of 1.8 points and 1.5 rebounds.
