= Attacus Veghel =

Attacus
- Leagues: Promotiedivisie
- Founded: 1972
- Location: Veghel, Netherlands
- Championships: 1 Promotiedivisie (2025)
- Website: https://www.attacus.nl/
Home

Attacus is a Dutch amateur basketball club based in Veghel. Established in 1972, the first men team currently play in the Promotiedivisie, the second-tier league in Dutch basketball. The club has won its first title in 2025, when it beat Lokomotief Rijswijk in the final 79–74 after double overtime.

The club also regularly participates in the NBB Cup, but has never managed to reach the quarterfinals.

== Honours ==
Promotiedivisie

- Winners (1): 2024–25

== Season by season ==
| Season | Tier | League | Pos. | NBB Cup |
|---|---|---|---|---|
| 2021–22 | 2 | Promotiedivisie | Runners-up | |
| 2022–23 | 2 | Promotiedivisie | 10th | Eight-finals |
| 2023–24 | 2 | Promotiedivisie | 4th | |
| 2024–25 | 2 | Promotiedivisie | Champion | Eight-finals |
| 2025–26 | 2 | Promotiedivisie | 6th | Eight-finals |
| 2026–27 | 2 | Promotiedivisie | | First round |
