= Utrecht Basketball =

- Leagues: Promotiedivisie
- Founded: 2006
- History: UBALL (2006-2026)
- Arena: Sportcentrum Oudenrijn
- Location: Utrecht, Netherlands

Utrecht Basketball is a Dutch amateur basketball club based in Utrecht. Established in 2006 as UBALL. The club merged with SVO Utrecht in 2026 and went further under the name Basketball Utrecht. The first men's team plays in the Promotiedivisie, the second highest tier of Dutch basketball. The clubs biggest achievement was reaching the Promotiedivisie finals in 2023. They lost the finals 79-102 against Lokomotief Rijswijk.

The club regularly plays against BNXT League teams in the NBB Cup. It however hasn't managed to pull an upset.

== Season by season ==
Season	Tier	League	Pos.	NBB Cup
2021–22	2	Promotiedivisie	9th	
2022–23	2	Promotiedivisie	Runners-up	Eight-finals
2023–24	2	Promotiedivisie	6th	
2024–25	2	Promotiedivisie	7th	
2025–26	2	Promotiedivisie	11th	Eight-finals
2026–27	2	Promotiedivisie		First round
