= EuroBasket 2029 bidding process =

Bids to host EuroBasket 2029

The EuroBasket 2029 bidding process entails the bids for the EuroBasket 2029. The four eventual winners will be decided during the FIBA Europe Board on 23 May 2025 in Riga, Latvia. The winners were Estonia, Greece, Slovenia and Spain, with the latter hosting the final phase.

== Bidding timeline ==
On 22 March 2024, FIBA Europe announced that the bidding process would start later in 2024. The deadline to submit a bid was the 29 November 2024. The winning bids were confirmed during the FIBA Europe board on 22 May 2025 in Riga, Latvia.

== Bids ==
On 4 December 2024, FIBA announced that eight countries applied to host the tournament:

- Estonia
- Finland (Withdrew)
- Germany (Withdrew)
- Greece
- Lithuania
- Netherlands
- Slovenia
- Spain

=== Estonia ===
- Estonia (At the Unibet Arena in Tallinn) – Estonia were announced as one of the eight bids on 4 December. If successful, it will be their first time hosting the tournament. They are bidding for a group.

Proposed venue in Estonia
| EuroBasket 2029 bidding process is located in Estonia | Tallinn |
|---|---|
| EuroBasket 2029 bidding process is located in Estonia | Unibet Arena |
| EuroBasket 2029 bidding process is located in Estonia | Capacity: 7,200 |

=== Greece ===
- Greece (At the Telekom Center Athens in Athens) – After successfully hosting one of the 2024 Olympic Qualifying Tournament in Piraeus. The Greek basketball federation president said that the country wants to host the 2029 tournament. They are bidding for a group and the knockout stage.

Proposed venue in Greece
| EuroBasket 2029 bidding process is located in Greece | Athens |
|---|---|
| EuroBasket 2029 bidding process is located in Greece | Telekom Center Athens |
| EuroBasket 2029 bidding process is located in Greece | Capacity: 18,300 |

=== Lithuania ===
- Lithuania (At the Žalgiris Arena in Kaunas) – Lithuania were announced as one of the eight bids on 4 December. Lithuania are hoping to host the EuroBasket for the first time since 2011. They are bidding for a group.

Proposed venue in Lithuania
| EuroBasket 2029 bidding process is located in Lithuania | Kaunas |
|---|---|
| EuroBasket 2029 bidding process is located in Lithuania | Žalgiris Arena |
| EuroBasket 2029 bidding process is located in Lithuania | Capacity: 15,415 |

=== Slovenia ===
- Slovenia (At the Arena Stožice in Ljubljana) – While announcing that they will not apply to host a 2024 Olympic Qualifying Tournament, the Basketball Federation of Slovenia (KZS) confirmed an intent to host a group at EuroBasket 2029. They are bidding for a group.

Proposed venue in Slovenia
| EuroBasket 2029 bidding process is located in Slovenia | Ljubljana |
|---|---|
| EuroBasket 2029 bidding process is located in Slovenia | Arena Stožice |
| EuroBasket 2029 bidding process is located in Slovenia | Capacity: 12,480 |

=== Netherlands ===
- Netherlands (At the Ahoy Arena in Rotterdam) – Netherlands are applying to organise the event for the first time ever in Rotterdam. They are bidding for a group.

Proposed venue in Netherlands
| EuroBasket 2029 bidding process is located in Netherlands | Rotterdam |
|---|---|
| EuroBasket 2029 bidding process is located in Netherlands | Ahoy Arena |
| EuroBasket 2029 bidding process is located in Netherlands | Capacity: 16,426 |

=== Spain ===
Spain (At the Movistar Arena in Madrid) – A week before the deadline, Spain confirmed that they are applying to host a group and the knockout stage in Madrid. The Spanish Basketball Federation has also proposed hosting the opening match at the Santiago Bernabéu Stadium, which could break the world record for the largest attendance at an indoor basketball game with at least 80,000 spectators. Spain last hosted the event in 2007.

Proposed venue in Spain
| EuroBasket 2029 bidding process is located in Spain | Madrid |
|---|---|
| EuroBasket 2029 bidding process is located in Spain | Movistar Arena |
| EuroBasket 2029 bidding process is located in Spain | Capacity: 15,000 |
Santiago Bernabéu Stadium (opening match only)
Capacity: 78,297

== Host selection ==
- Estonia
- Greece
- Lithuania
- Netherlands
- Slovenia
- Spain

On 22 May 2025, Estonia, Greece, Slovenia and Spain were awarded the hosting rights over Lithuania and Netherlands, with the latter being assigned hosts of the final phase. This marks the first time that Estonia will host EuroBasket, with 1995, 2007 and 2013 being the last time that Greece, Slovenia and Spain have hosted the tournament respectively.

== Withdrawn bids ==
=== Finland ===
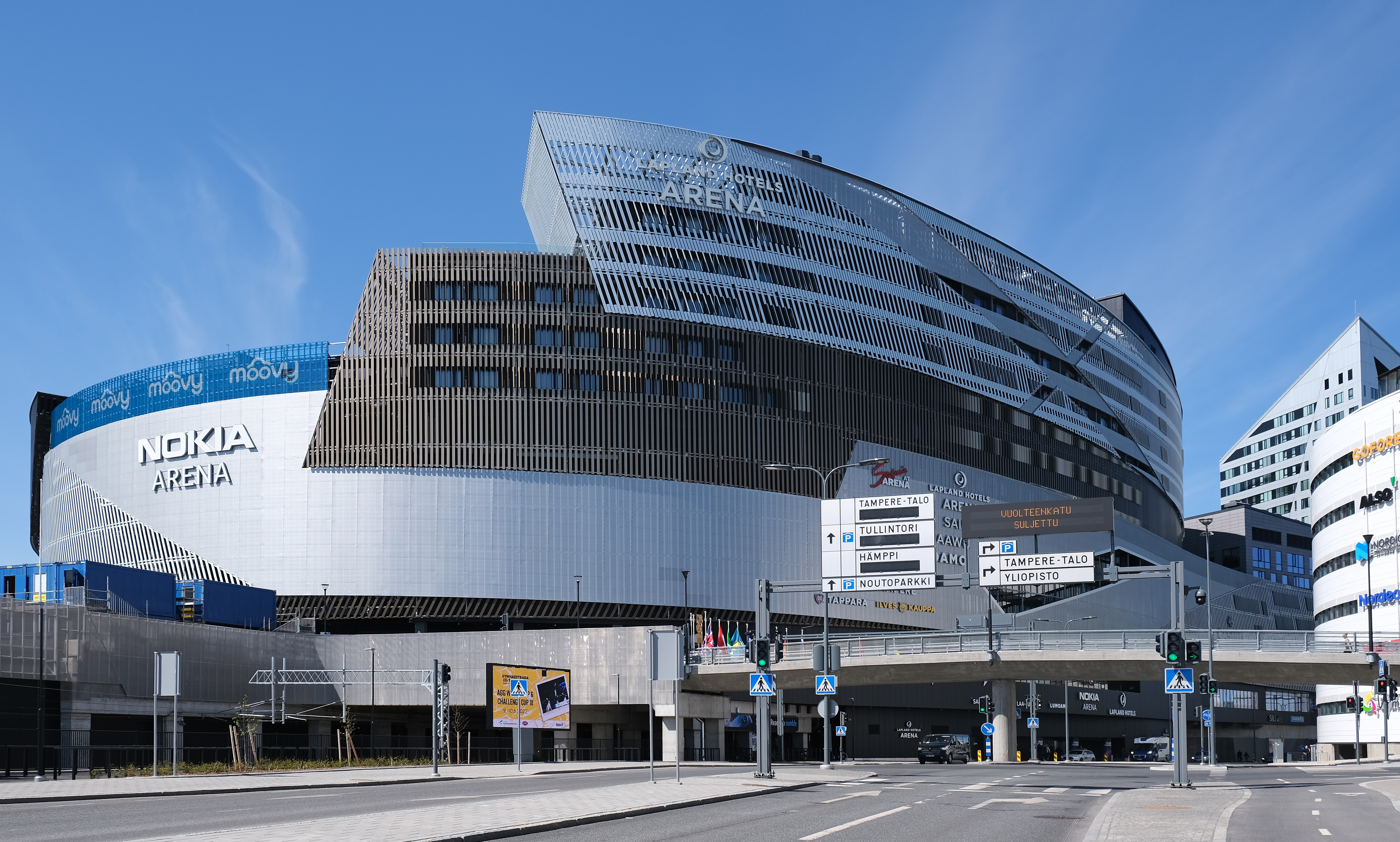
Nokia Arena

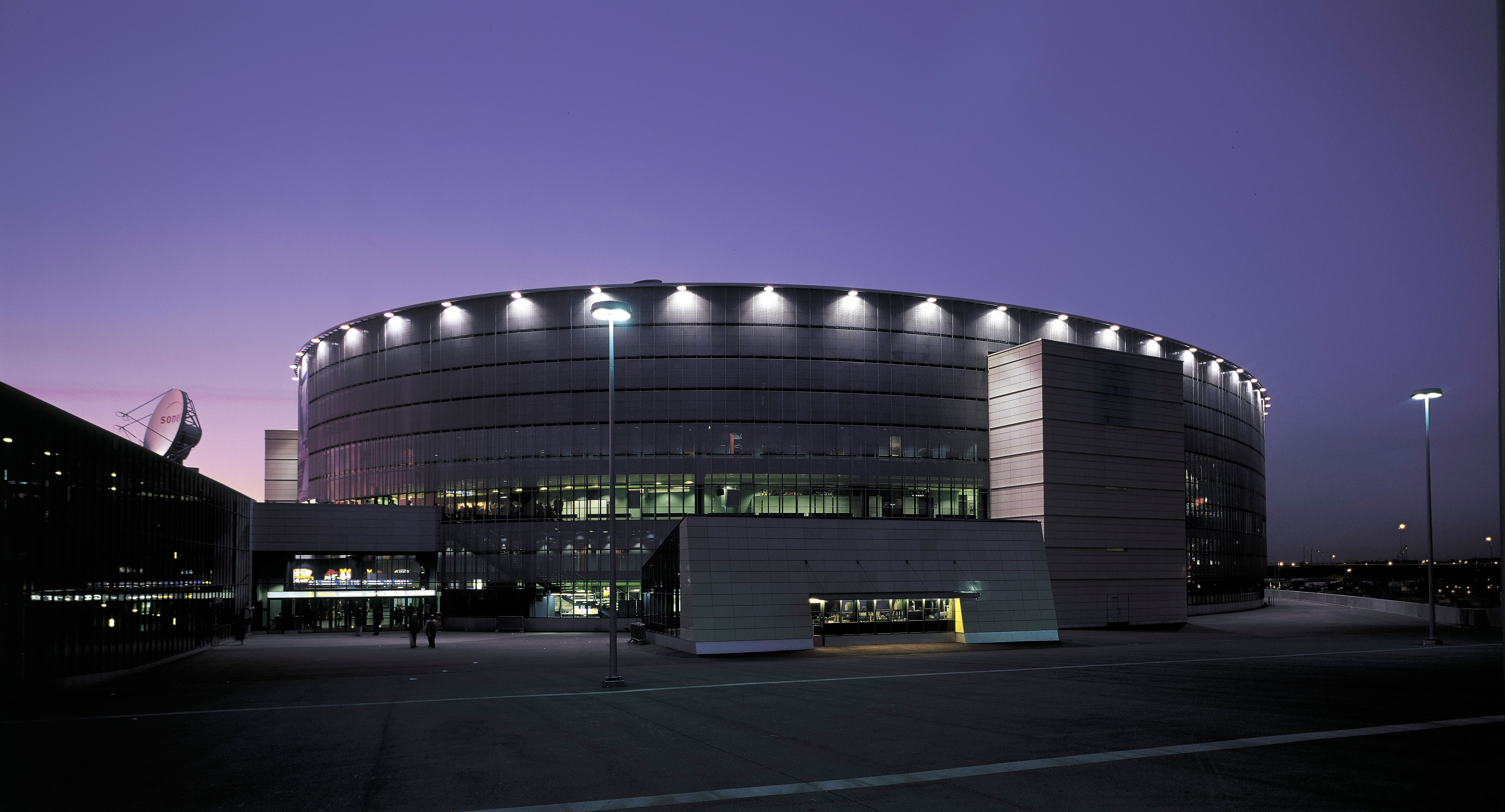
Helsinki Halli

- Finland (Venue unknown, either in Helsinki or Tampere) – Finland are aiming to become the first nation to host back to back EuroBaskets having placed a bid for 2029. They are bidding for a group in either Helsinki or Tampere with the venue unknown. Finland withdrew their bid at the last minute.

Proposed venue in Finland
| EuroBasket 2029 bidding process is located in Finland | Helsinki or Tampere |
|---|---|
| EuroBasket 2029 bidding process is located in Finland | TBD |
| EuroBasket 2029 bidding process is located in Finland | Capacity: TBD |
| EuroBasket 2029 bidding process is located in Finland | TBD |

=== Germany ===
- Germany (At the SAP Garden in Munich) – After last hosting EuroBasket in 2022, Germany have put a bid to host the competition in Munich. On 7 March 2025, FIBA announced that Germany had withdrawn from the bidding process.

Proposed venue in Germany
| EuroBasket 2029 bidding process is located in Germany | Munich |
|---|---|
| EuroBasket 2029 bidding process is located in Germany | SAP Garden |
| EuroBasket 2029 bidding process is located in Germany | Capacity: 12,500 |

== Decided not to bid ==
=== Slovakia ===
- Slovakia (At the Ondrej Nepela Arena in Bratislava) – After bidding for EuroBasket Women 2027, Slovakia expressed an interest in hosting the 2029 EuroBasket in Bratislava. However, this never materialised.

Proposed venue in Slovakia
| EuroBasket 2029 bidding process is located in Slovakia | Bratislava |
|---|---|
| EuroBasket 2029 bidding process is located in Slovakia | Ondrej Nepela Arena |
| EuroBasket 2029 bidding process is located in Slovakia | Capacity: 10,055 |
