= Hot Pepper Heat =

- Leagues: Promotiedivisie
- Founded: 2022
- Location: Zwanenburg, Netherlands
- Head coach: Wierd Goedee
- Ownership: Romario van 't Land
- Website: https://hotpepperheat.nl/
Home

Hot Pepper Heat is a Dutch amateur basketball club based in Zwanenburg. Founded in 2022, the first men team currently play in the Promotiedivisie, the second-tier league in Dutch basketball. The clubs biggest achievement was reaching the Promotiedivisie finals in their first season in the Promotiedivisie in 2024. They lost this finals 58-78 from the second team of the Den Helder Suns.

The club has a youth academy. The club offers in each youth category a chance to play in the highest national level. The academy won national championships in the U22 category in 2024 and 2026 and in the U20 category in 2024.

== Season by season ==
Season	Tier	League	Pos.	NBB Cup
2023–24	2	Promotiedivisie	Runners-up	
2024–25	2	Promotiedivisie	7th	
2025–26	2	Promotiedivisie	8th	First round
2026–27	2	Promotiedivisie	TBD	Second round
