= River Trotters =

- Leagues: Promotiedivisie
- Founded: 1981
- Arena: De Wielewaal
- Location: Hardinxveld-Giessendam, Netherlands
- Website: https://rivertrotters.nl/

River Trotters is a Dutch amateur basketball club based in Hardinxveld-Giessendam. Established in 1981, the first men team currently play in the Promotiedivisie, the second-tier league in Dutch basketball.

The club earned their promotion to the Promotiedivisie after winning the 1e Divisie finals in 2023. The club beat BV Amsterdam in the finals 82–69.

== Season by season ==
| Season | Tier | League | Pos. | NBB Cup |
|---|---|---|---|---|
| 2023–24 | 3 | 1e Divisie | Champions | |
| 2023–24 | 2 | Promotiedivisie | 7th | |
| 2024–25 | 2 | Promotiedivisie | 5th | |
| 2025–26 | 2 | Promotiedivisie | 5th | Second round |
| 2026–27 | 2 | Promotiedivisie | | First round |
