= Orange Lions Academy =

- Leagues: Promotiedivisie
- Founded: 2018
- Location: Amsterdam, Netherlands
- Website: https://basketball.nl/orange-lions/academy/mannen/

Orange Lions Academy is a Dutch basketball academy based in Amsterdam. Established in 2018, the first men team currently play in the Promotiedivisie, the second-tier league in Dutch basketball. Players for the Orange Lions Academy live in the Centrum voor Topsport en Onderwijs (CTO) Amsterdam, a location where elite athletes live, study and train together.

The academy was founded by Basketball Nederland in combination with CTO Amsterdam and NOC*NSF. The academy focusses on creating an environment where athletes can combine studying and elite sports. Athletes receive more opportunities to train and compete, but only if their study results are up to standard. In addition, athletes part of the academy get government subsidies to live in Amsterdam, since most are not native to the city.

The academy has already proved successful, with many athletes achieving a professional career in basketball.

== Season by season ==
Season	Tier	League	Pos.	NBB Cup
2023–24	2	Promotiedivisie	5th	
2024–25	2	Promotiedivisie	8th	
2025–26	2	Promotiedivisie	12th	Eight-finals
2026–27	2	Promotiedivisie		First round
