= Orca's Urk =

- League: Eerste divisie
- Founded: August 2, 1963; 61 years ago
- Location: Urk, Netherlands
- President: Fred de Jong

Orca's Urk, formerly known as BV Orca's, is a Dutch basketball club based in Urk. The team currently plays in the Eerste divisie, the national third-tier level. The team was founded on 2 August 1963.

From 1983 to 1992, Orca's played in the Eredivisie, the highest level league in the Netherlands.

Worthy de Jong, one of the most accomplished Dutch basketball players, played with Orca's in 2009–10.

== Honours ==
Promotiedivisie (2nd tier)

- Champions (3): 1982–83, 1997–98, 2012–13

Eerste divisie (3rd tier)

- Champions (2): 1981–82, 1985–86

== Notable players ==
- Martin de Vries (1983–1984)
- Marcel Huijbens (1989–1992)
- Worthy de Jong (2008–2009)

== Head coaches ==
- Glenn Pinas (1990–1991)
- Marco van den Berg (1990–1991)
