= 2015–16 NBB Cup =

NBB Cup
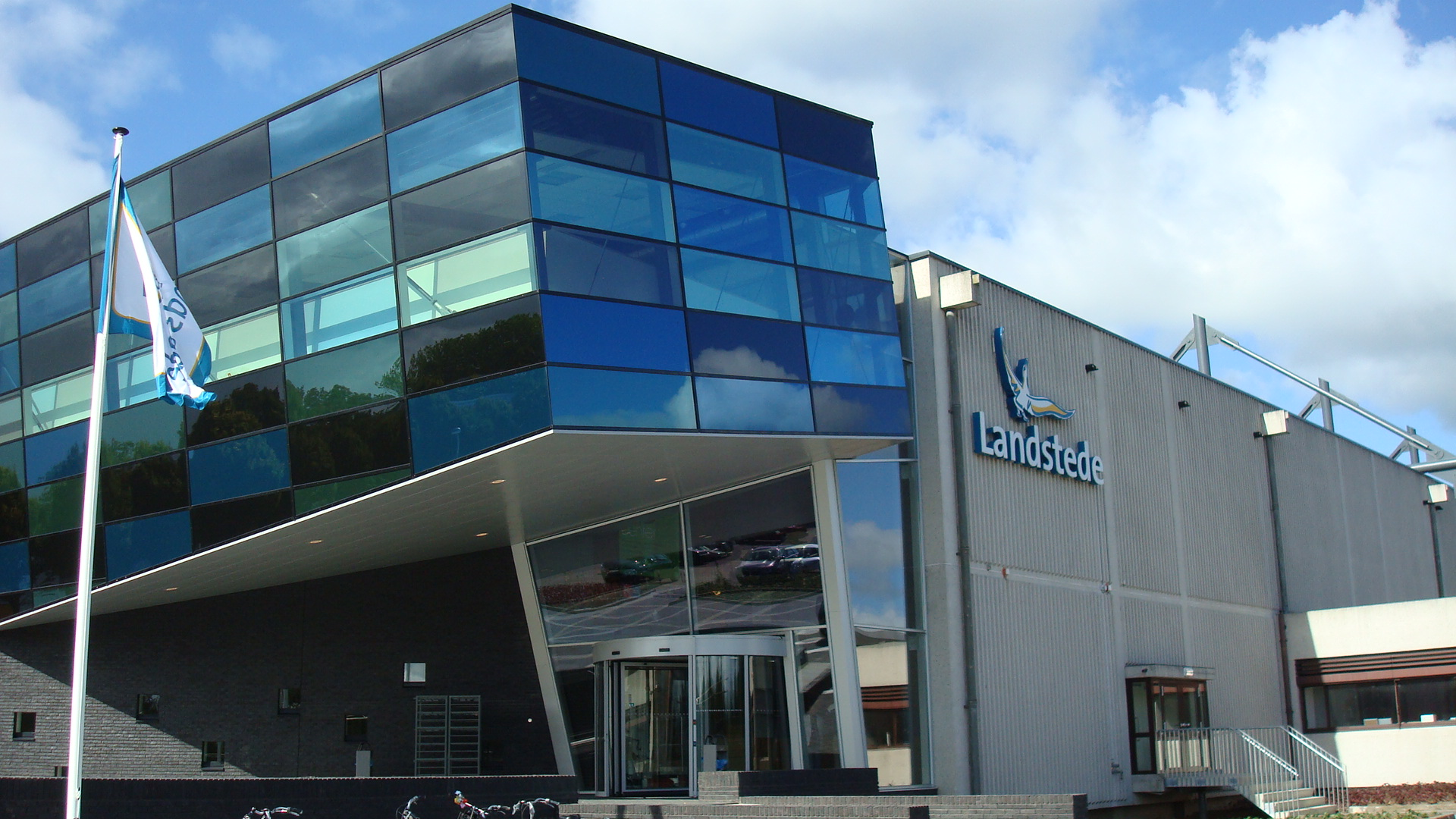
- The Landstede Sportcentrum hosted the Cup Final
- Season: 2015–16
- Teams: 52

Finals
- Champions: SPM Shoeters Den Bosch (7th title)
- Runners-up: ZZ Leiden

The 2015–16 NBB Cup was the 48th edition of the Netherlands national basketball cup tournament. SPM Shoeters Den Bosch won its 7th national cup title after beating ZZ Leiden in the Final. The Final was played on 27 March 2016 in the Landstede Sportcentrum in Zwolle.

== Format ==
In the first, second and third round teams from the Dutch second, third and fourth division participate. From the fourth round, teams from the Dutch Basketball League (DBL) enter the competition. Quarter- and semi-finals are played in a two-legged format. When a team form a tier lower than the DBL played a DBL team, one win is sufficient for the latter to advance to the next round.

== Bracket ==
Quarterfinals
Red Stars Soest	44	–	44
ZZ Leiden	101	–	101
Landstede Zwolle	74	71	145
Apollo Amsterdam	63	66	129
Grasshoppers	71	–	71
Aris Leeuwarden	91	–	91
Lokomotief Rijswijk	59	–	59
SPM Shoeters Den Bosch	87	–	87

Semifinals
ZZ Leiden	86	62	148
Landstede Basketbal	67	73	140
Aris Leeuwarden	55	62	117
SPM Shoeters Den Bosch	72	88	160

Final
ZZ Leiden	57
SPM Shoeters Den Bosch	58

== Fourth round ==
Team 1	Score	Team 2
Red Stars	82–72	Trajanum
BSW	62–87	ZZ Leiden
BV Hoofddorp	32–130	Landstede
Donar	66–68	Apollo Amsterdam
Grasshoppers	99–93	Challenge Sports Rotterdam
Red Giants	75–85	Aris Leeuwarden
Lokomotief Rijswijk	86–79	CobraNova
Binnenland	50–90	SPM Shoeters Den Bosch

== Quarterfinals ==
Team 1	Agg.	Team 2	1st leg	2nd leg
Red Stars	44–101	ZZ Leiden	44–101	–
Landstede	145–129	Apollo Amsterdam	74–63	71–66
Grasshoppers	71–91	Aris Leeuwarden	71–91	–
Lokomotief Rijswijk	59–87	SPM Shoeters Den Bosch	59–87	–

== Semifinals ==
Team 1	Agg.	Team 2	1st leg	2nd leg
ZZ Leiden	148–140	Landstede	86–67	62–73
Aris Leeuwarden	117–160	SPM Shoeters Den Bosch	55–72	62–88

== Final ==
27 March 2016	ZZ Leiden	55–57	SPM Shoeters Den Bosch	Zwolle
21:30 (CET +1)	Scoring by quarter: 17-17, 22-16, 8-15, 10-10
	Pts: de Jong 23; Rebs: Koenis 10; Asts: Jansen 5	Boxscore	Pts: Wessels 13; Rebs: de Pagter 10; Asts: Slagter 4	Arena: Landstede Sportcentrum

Leiden	Den Bosch
