= Arnhem Eagles =

- Leagues: 2e divisie
- Founded: 2011
- Arena: MFC De Omnibus
- Location: Arnhem, Netherlands
- Team colors
- Website: https://arnhemeagles.nl/

Arnhem Eagles is a Dutch amateur basketball club based in Arnhem. The club is the result of a merger between Arnhem ACES and Arnhem ACES in 2011. The first men's team currently play in the Promotiedivisie, the second-tier league in Dutch basketball.

The club boasts almost 600 members and is therefore the third biggest club in the Netherlands.

== History ==
The club has a vision to mainly play with players coming up through the club itself. This vision earned them a promotion from the 2e divisie to the 1e divisie in 2022. Quickly afterwards they earned in 2024 their promotion to the second level of Dutch basketball, the Promotiedivisie.

However in 2026 a few key players left the club, due to the lack of a new coach. Rather than attracting new players, the club stayed true to their vision and decided to pull back from the Promotiedivisie for the 2026–27 season. The club's second team, which just earned a promotion to the 2e divisie, became the first team.

== Season by season ==
Season	Tier	League	Pos.	NBB Cup
2021–22	4	2e divisie	Champion	
2022–23	3	1e divisie	5th	
2023–24	3	1e divisie	Champion	
2024–25	2	Promotiedivisie	10th	
2025–26	2	Promotiedivisie	9th	Second round
2026–27	4	2e divisie		Second round
