= VBC Akrides =

Akrides
- Leagues: 1e divisie
- Founded: 5 October 1961; 64 years ago
- Arena: Sporthal IJmuiden-Oost
- Location: IJmuiden, Netherlands
- Main sponsor: DHL Global Mail
- Championships: 2 NBB Cups
- Website: www.akrides.nl
Home

Velser Basketballclub Akrides or simply Akrides is a professional basketball club based in IJmuiden, Netherlands. The men's team plays in the 1e divisie, the third tier of Dutch basketball.

== History ==
Akrides was founded on October 5, 1961 by Joop Roosenstein. In 1987, the first men's team under the name ESTS Akrides promoted to the Eredivisie, where it remained two seasons. In 1990 Akrides again played in the premier league, then under the name Bestmate Akrides and coming from Haarlem. After three years, the team was moved back to IJmuiden. After the season 1996/1997 Akrides relegated again.

Highlights in the history of Akrides are the winning of the Dutch Cup in 1990 and 1991. The next two years Bestmate Akrides participated in 1990–91 FIBA European Cup Winners' Cup and 1991–92 FIBA European Cup but eliminated by Uppsala (first round, 75–95 defeat away, 94–80 win in home) the first time and by Sunair Oostende (second round, home win 68–63, 66–88 away defeat).

== Name through history ==
- Akrides (1961–1987)
- ESTS Akrides (1987–1990)
- Bestmade Akrides (1990–1992)
- Akrides (1992–1994)
- Big Boss Akrides (1994–1997)
- Akrides (1997–present)

== Honours & achievements ==
Dutch Cup

- Winners (2): 1989–90, 1990–91

== Season by season ==
Season	Tier	League	Pos.	NBB Cup
2016-17	2	1e divisie	Champion	
2017-18	2	Promotiedivisie	8th	
2018-19	3	1e divisie	9th	
2019-21	Seasons cancelled due to the COVID-19 pandemic			
2021-22	3	1e divisie	5th	
2022-23	3	1e divisie	4th	
2023-24	3	1e divisie	7th	
2024-25	3	1e divisie	9th	
2025-26	3	1e divisie	7th	
2026-27	3	1e divisie		Preliminary round

== European record ==
Season	Competition	Round	Club	Home	Away	Agg
1990–91	FIBA European Cup Winners' Cup	First round	(Sweden) Uppsala	94–80	75–95	169–175
1991–92	FIBA European Cup	Second round	(Belgium) Oostende	68–63	66–88	134–151

Notes

1. Akrides points are listed first.
