= Red Giants (basketball) =

- Leagues: 3e Divisie
- Founded: 1974; 52 years ago
- Arena: Sporthal Ezinge
- Location: Meppel, Netherlands
- Main sponsor: KFFA
- President: Gert Klamer
- Vice-president: Patrick Koning
- Championships: 1 NBB Cup
- Website: www.redgiants.nl
Home	Away

Red Giants is a Dutch basketball club based in Meppel, Drenthe. Founded in 1974 as Alcides, the club reached the Eredivisie in 1987. It played in the Dutch highest tier league until 1996. In 1994, Red Giants won the NBB Cup. Currently, it plays in the 3e Divisie, the 5th level of Dutch Basketball. Home games are played in the Sportcentrum Ezinge.

== Honours ==
NBB Cup

- Winners (1): 1993–94

Promotiedivisie

- Winners (1): 2015–16

== Season by season ==
Season	Tier	League	Pos.	NBB Cup
2008–09	2	Promotiedivisie	11th	
2009–10	2	Promotiedivisie	4th	
2010–11	2	Promotiedivisie	4th	Fourth round
2011–12	2	Promotiedivisie	6th	
2012–13	2	Promotiedivisie	6th	Fourth round
2013–14	2	Promotiedivisie	5th	
2014–15	2	Promotiedivisie	Runner-up	Fourth round
2015–16	2	Promotiedivisie	Champion	Fourth round
2016–17	2	Promotiedivisie	6th	Fourth round
2017–18	2	Promotiedivisie	5th	
2018–19	2	Promotiedivisie	8th	
2019–20	Seasons cancelled due to the COVID-19 pandemic			
2020–21	Seasons cancelled due to the COVID-19 pandemic			
2021–22	4	2e divisie	10th	
2022–23	4	2e divisie	6th	
2023–24	4	2e divisie	8th	
2024–25	4	2e divisie	11th	
2025–26	5	3e divisie	3rd	
2026–27	4	2e divisie		

== List of head coaches ==
Period	Coach	Nationality
1994–1995	Marco van den Berg	(Netherlands)
