= BC Triple Threat =

Triple Threat
- League: Promotiedivisie (men's); Women's Basketball League (women's)
- Founded: 27 December 2009; 16 years ago
- Arena: Spaarnehal
- Location: Haarlem, Netherlands
- Website: www.vereniging.triplethreat.nl

BC Triple Threat is a Dutch basketball club based in Haarlem. Its men's team plays in the Promotiedivisie, the second division of basketball in the Netherlands. Its women's team plays in the Women's Basketball League, the premier level of basketball in the Netherlands.

The team was founded in 2009 to offer a platform for the youth in the Schalkwijk neighbourhood. Founder Okrah Donor aimed to make the borough safer and improve its image. Four years later, in 2013, the local basketball team HOC was declared bankrupt, which paved the way for Triple Threat to start teaching basketball. In May 2020, the club announced its first women's team would enter the WBL.

== Notable players ==
- (Netherlands) Naomi Halman
- (Netherlands) Yannick Kraag

== Season by season ==
=== Men's team ===
Season	Tier	League	Pos.	NBB Cup
2025-26	3	1e divisie	Runner-up	Eight-finals
2026-27	2	Promotiedivisie		Second round
