= De Groene Uilen =

Groningen basketball team

G.S.B.V. De Groene Uilen-Moestasj
- Nickname: De Groene Uilen
- Leagues: Promotiedivisie
- Founded: 1957; 69 years ago
- Arena: Willem Alexander Sportcentrum
- Capacity: 1.100
- Location: Groningen, Netherlands
- Championships: 2 Dutch Second Division
- Website: groeneuilenmoestasj.nl
Home	Away

G.S.B.V. De Groene Uilen-Moestasj is a student sports association from Groningen, Netherlands. It was founded as 'De Groene Uilen' (The Green Owls) in 1957. The first men's team competes in the Promotiedivisie, the second tier of Dutch basketball.

== History ==
Traditionally, the club organised a yearly international tournament called the GUMIT (Groene Uilen Moestasj International Tournament) together with the other Groningen basketball club, Moestasj, in which clubs from different countries participate over the duration of three days.

In 2014, the club won its first championship in the Promotiedivisie. They defeated Aarnoudse/Binnenland with 52-48 in the finals. After the championship, the club had the right to promote to the Dutch Basketball League. After deliberation the club however decided to stay in the Promotiedivisie.

Due to being situated in the same city, having an ovelapping following and only playing one tier lower, the professional club Donar has played many pre-season games with de Groene Uilen. The first official match between the two sides took place on the 11th of december 2014, when the faced off for the Dutch Basketball Cup. The match resulted in a 47-96 victory for Donar, eliminating de Groene Uilen from the tournament.

In 2015, the club won its second championship in the Promotiedivisie. In the final, they defeated the Red Giants from Meppel after double overtime with 76-75.

In 2018, the club merged with the other student basketball team in the city, Moestasj, creating the club in its current form.

Following the demotion of Donar’s second team from the Promotiedivisie in 2025, the professional club dissolved the team and merged it with De Groene Uilen-Moestasj’s first men’s team.

Due to their financial troubles in 2023, the traditional pre-season match between Donar and de Groene uilen had not been organised for several years. In 2025 this tradition was reinstated with another edition. Donar won with 103-44 in front of 450 spectators.

== Honours ==
Promotiedivisie

- Winners (2): 2013–14, 2014–15

Runners-up: 1999-2000

== Season by season ==
Season	Tier	League	Pos.	NBB Cup
2012-13	2	Promotiedivisie	2nd	
2013-14	2	Promotiedivisie	Champions	
2014-15	2	Promotiedivisie	Champions	Fourth round
2015-16	2	Promotiedivisie	8th	
2016-17	2	Promotiedivisie	4th	Fourth round
2017-18	2	Promotiedivisie	3rd	
2018-19	2	Promotiedivisie	11th	
2019-20	2	Promotiedivisie	9th	
2020-21	2	Promotiedivisie	Cancelled	
2021-22	2	Promotiedivisie	10th	
2022-23	2	Promotiedivisie	7th	Eight-finals
2023-24	2	Promotiedivisie	4th	Eight-finals
2024-25	2	Promotiedivisie	6th	
2025-26	2	Promotiedivisie	14th	First round
2026–27	2	Promotiedivisie		First round
