= Promotiedivisie =

- Organising body: Basketball Nederland
- Country: Netherlands
- Confederation: FIBA Europe (Europe)
- Number of teams: 18
- Level on pyramid: 2
- Promotion to: BNXT League
- Relegation to: Eerste divisie
- Domestic cup: NBB Cup
- Current champions: GET United (1st title) (2025–26)
- Most championships: Akrides (5 titles)
- 2026–27 Promotiedivisie

The Promotiedivisie (English: Promotion Division) is the second tier of basketball in the Netherlands and is the highest amateur competition in the country. At the end of a Promotiedivisie-season, a Final Four is played to decide the new champion.

The champion technically earns the right to promote to the Dutch Basketball League, although it only happens in exceptional cases, because a club has to turn professional to play in the league. The bottom team relegates to the Eerste divisie, the national third division.

== History ==
In 2012, Apollo Amsterdam became the first Promotiedivise champion to promote to the next season of the Dutch Basketball League. Lokomotief is the most successful team with three won titles.

Ahead of the 2023–24 season, the Promotiedivisie was expanded to 24 teams with two groups of twelve (Group A and Group B).

For the 2025–26 season, the Promotiedivisie was reduced to 17 teams again. It was the first year a team from the BNXT League was relegated from the BNXT League to the Promotiedivisie, as GET United was relegated due to sportive results. This relegation once again served as an example that the gap between the BNXT and the Promotiedivisie was too big and the case for a new division to fill the gap would be beneficial to Dutch Basketball. With the pull-back of a further three BNXT teams, this call for a new Dutch League became even bigger. The new league, with the working title Men's Basketball League, was however not ready to be implemented yet for the 2026–27 season. This meant that the association was forced to open the Promotiedivisie again for more teams. For a single year, the teams were not decided by just sportive results, but ambitious clubs were also allowed to apply. This 2026–27 season would therefore serve as a year to test which clubs are capable of joining the MBL in its inaugural 2027–28 season.

== Current teams ==
There are 18 teams in the 2026–27 season.

Team	City
Apollo Amsterdam	Amsterdam
Attacus	Veghel
Basketball Academie Limburg	Weert
Biks Shots	Hilvarenbeek
BV Amsterdam	Amsterdam
Den Helder Suns	Den Helder
GET United	Bemmel
De Groene Uilen	Groningen
Hot Pepper Heat	Zwanenburg
Lokomotief	Rijswijk
MBCA	Amstelveen
Orange Lions Academy	Amsterdam
River Trotters	Hardinxveld-Giessendam
Triple Threat	Haarlem
Utrecht Basketball	Utrecht
Utrecht Bull's	Utrecht
Uitsmijters	Almelo
ZZ Leiden II	Leiden

== Finals ==
Year	Winner	Runner-up	Score	Ref.
1982–83	Orca's	Virtus Werkendam		
1983–84	BC Markt Utrecht	BV Amsterdam		
1984–85	BC Markt Utrecht	Interbril Greyhounds		
1985–86	ICL Zaandam	DAS Delft		
1986–87	Akrides	Red Giants		
1987–88	Gunco Rotterdam	BV Voorburg		
1988–89	BV Voorburg	BC Eindhoven		
1989–90	Akrides (2)	Goba Gorinchem		
1990–91	Basketiers '71	Gunco Rotterdam		
1991–92	BV Dakplan	Festo BVV		
1992–93	Akrides (3)	GOBA Gorinchem		
1993–94	Festo BVV	PSV–Almonte Basketbal		
1994–95	BV Voorburg	De Dunckers		
1995–96	RZG Drenthe	Image Center Hank		
1996–97	Prisma College	DAS Delft		
1997–98	Orca's (2)	Libertel Doplhins 2		
1998–99	Akrides (4)	Ricoh Astronauts 2		
1999–2000	Akrides (5)	De Groene Uilen		
2000–01	Early Bird	Akrides		
2001–02	Early Bird	ASVU		
2002–03	Early Bird	EiffelTowers Den Bosch 2		
2003–04	BV Aris	Early Bird		
2004–05	MSV Noordwijk	Omniworld 2		
2005–06	Demon Astronauts 2	MSV Noordwijk	—N/a	
2006–07	EBBC	ASVU	—N/a	
2007–08	MSV Noordwijk	Amsterdam 2	—N/a	
2008–09	GOBA	MSV Noordwijk	91–67	
2009–10	Amsterdam 2	Binnenland	66–53	
2010–11	Binnenland	De Hoppers	76–70	
2011–12	Apollo Amsterdam	Binnenland	64–52	
2012–13	Orca's (3)	Binnenland	74–53	
2013–14	De Groene Uilen	Binnenland	52–48	
2014–15	De Groene Uilen (2)	Red Giants	76–75	
2015–16	Red Giants	Binnenland	80–68	
2016–17	Landslake Lions	Grasshoppers	89–68	
2017–18	Lokomotief	Grasshoppers	74–67	
2018–19	Lokomotief (2)	Grasshoppers	81–70	
2019–20	Seasons cancelled due to the COVID-19 pandemic			
2020–21	Seasons cancelled due to the COVID-19 pandemic			
2021–22	Lokomotief (3)	Attacus	72–60	
2022–23	Lokomotief (4)	UBALL	102–79	
2023–24	BV Noordkop/Suns	Hot Pepper Heat	78–58	
2024–25	Attacus	Lokomotief	79-74	
2025–26	GET United	Apollo Amsterdam	83-72	

== Performance by club ==
Teams shown in italics are no longer in existence.

Club	Wins	Seasons won
Akrides	5	1987, 1990, 1993, 1999, 2000
Lokomotief	4	2018, 2019, 2022, 2023
Early Bird	3	2001, 2002, 2003
Orca's	3	1983, 1998, 2013
Amsterdam 2	2	2006, 2010
De Groene Uilen	2	2014, 2015
MSV Noordwijk	2	2005, 2008
Red Giants Meppel	1	2016
BV Noordkop/Suns	1	2024
Attacus	1	2025
GET United	1	2026

== Awards ==
Most Valuable Player

- 2010 (Netherlands) Zeeger van Leeuwen (MSV Noordwijk)
- 2013 (Netherlands) Richard Maxwell (Rotterdam Basketbal 2)
- 2014 (Lithuania) Vaidas Tamasauskas (Rotterdam Basketbal 2)

Coach of the Year

- 2010 (Netherlands) Joost van Rangelrooy
