= Lokomotief Rijswijk =

Lokomotief
- Nickname: Loko
- Leagues: Promotiedivisie
- Founded: 1 April 1971; 55 years ago as ROS
- History: ROS; 1971–1980; Lokomotief Rijswijk; 1980–present
- Arena: Sporthal De Altis
- Location: Rijswijk, Netherlands
- Championships: 4 Dutch Second Division; 1 NBB Cup
- Website: lokomotief-rijswijk.net
Home

Lokomotief Rijswijk, better known as simply Lokomotief, is a Dutch amateur basketball club in Rijswijk. Established on 1 April 1971, both the first men's and women's teams currently play in the Promotiedivisie, the second-tier league in Dutch basketball. The club has won one major trophy in its history, when it won the NBB Cup in the 1986–87 season. Between 2018 and 2023, Lokomotief won four consecutive Promotiedivisie titles, becoming the first club to do so. The team has since then played well in the NBB Cup competition, even eliminating first level club Den Helder Suns in the 2020–21 season.

== Honours ==
Promotiedivisie

- Winners (4): 2017–18, 2018–19, 2021–22, 2022–23

NBB Cup

- Winners (1): 1986–87

== Season by season ==
Season	Tier	League	Pos.	NBB Cup
2015-16	3	Eerste divisie	Champion	Quarterfinals
2016-17	2	Promotiedivisie	3rd	
2017-18	2	Promotiedivisie	Champion	
2018-19	2	Promotiedivisie	Champion	
2019–20	Seasons cancelled due to the COVID-19 pandemic			
2020–21	Seasons cancelled due to the COVID-19 pandemic			
2021-22	2	Promotiedivisie	Champion	Eigthfinals
2022-23	2	Promotiedivisie	Champion	Quarterfinals
2023-24	2	Promotiedivisie	3rd	
2024-25	2	Promotiedivisie	Runners-up	Eightfinals
2025-26	2	Promotiedivisie	3rd	Eightfinals
2026–27	2	Promotiedivisie		First round
