= BV Amsterdam =

- Leagues: Promotiedivisie
- Founded: 1965
- Location: Amsterdam, Netherlands
- Website: bvamsterdam.nl

BV Amsterdam is a Dutch basketball club based in Amsterdam. Established in 1965, the first men team currently play in the Promotiedivisie, the second-tier league in Dutch basketball, after their promotion following their 1e Divisie championship in 2026.

The club regularly competes in the Dutch Cup, with their most notable run in 2019 when the club reached the quarterfinals. In the quarterfinals, they met the DBL club Dutch Windmills. However, the amateurs were not prepared for the professionals and lost 46–88.

== Season by season ==
| Season | Tier | League | Pos. | NBB Cup |
|---|---|---|---|---|
| 2018–19 | 3 | 1e divisie | 2nd | Quarter-finals |
| 2019–20 | Seasons cancelled due to the COVID-19 pandemic | | | |
| 2020–21 | Seasons cancelled due to the COVID-19 pandemic | | | |
| 2021–22 | 3 | 1e divisie | 4th | |
| 2022–23 | 3 | 1e divisie | Runners-up | |
| 2023–24 | 2 | Promotiedivisie | 6th | |
| 2024–25 | 2 | Promotiedivisie | 19th | |
| 2025–26 | 3 | 1e divisie | Champions | Eight-finals |
| 2026–27 | 2 | Promotiedivisie | | |
