= Zwanenburg =

- Village
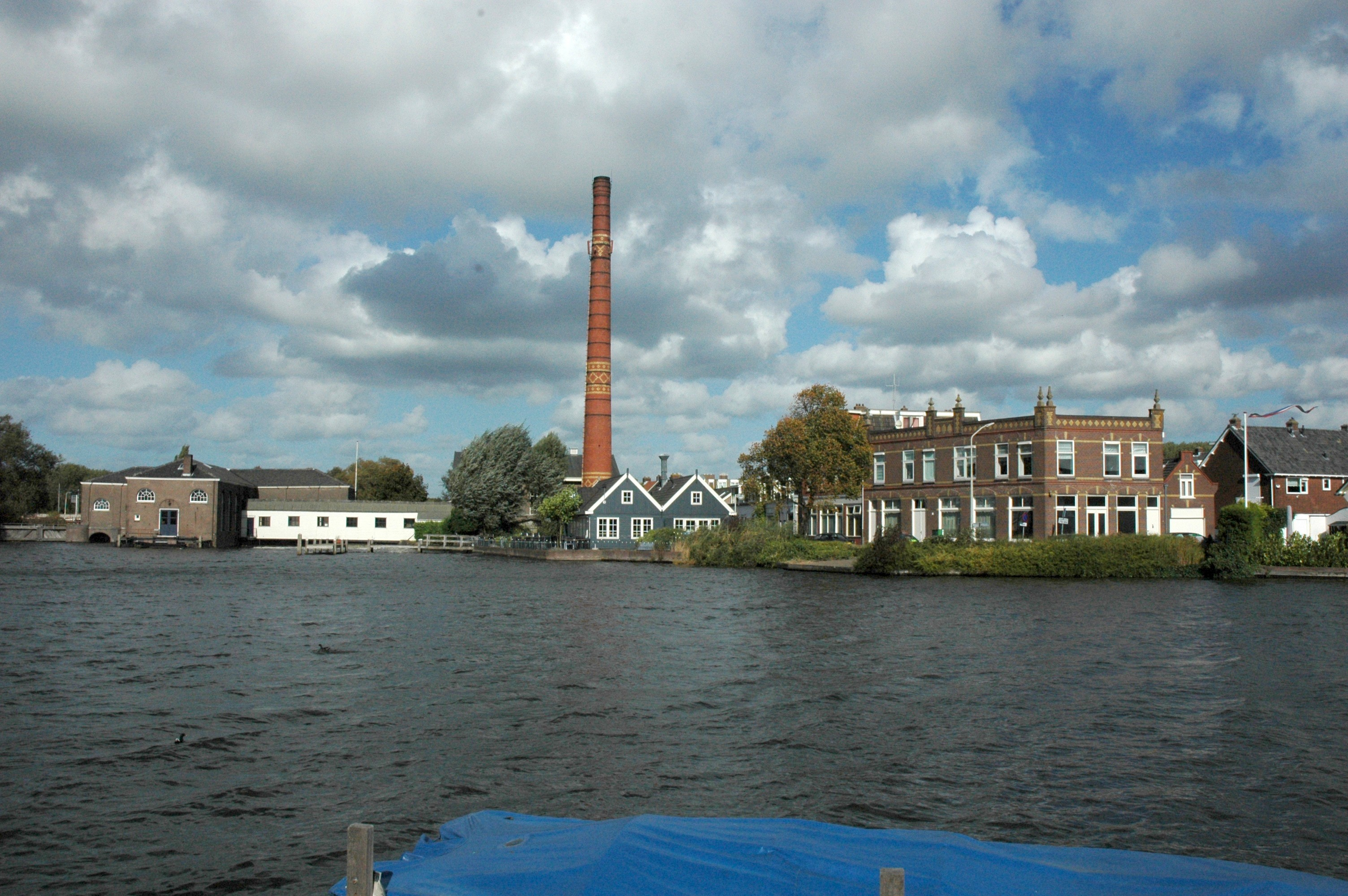
- View from Zwanenburg to Halfweg

- Location in the Netherlands Location in the province of North Holland in the Netherlands
- Coordinates: 52°23′N 4°45′E
- Country: Netherlands
- Province: North Holland
- Municipality: Haarlemmermeer

Area
  - Total: 7.17 km^{2} (2.77 sq mi)
- Elevation: −3.2 m (−10 ft)

Population (2021)
  - Total: 7,935
  - Density: 1,110/km^{2} (2,870/sq mi)
- Time zone: UTC+1 (CET)
  - Summer (DST): UTC+2 (CEST)
- Postal code: 1161
- Dialing code: 020

Zwanenburg (Dutch pronunciation: [ˈzʋaːnə(m)bʏr(ə)x]) is a town in the Dutch province of North Holland. It is a part of the municipality of Haarlemmermeer, and lies about 11 km west of Amsterdam.

Zwanenburg has a population of around 7,670.

== History ==
Zwanenburg takes its name from Gemeenlandshuis Zwanenburg, the former headquarters of the Hoogheemraadschap Rijnland, a water board that used to have its headquarters in Halfweg, on the other side of the canal known today as the Ringvaart. Up until the 19th century, Zwanenburg was under water. When the pumping station at Halfweg had succeeded in making the land ripe for building, the workers who had settled at Halfweg purchased this cheap land below the dike for their homes. The infrastructure linking Halfweg to Haarlem and Amsterdam was already quite good, so Zwanenburg became a true commuter town. Halfweg was also the site of the Halfweg sugar factory, first opened in 1863, that served as an employer for Zwanenburg residents for more than a century. For this reason, the history of Zwanenburg cannot be seen separately from the history of Halfweg.

=== Halfweg buildings important to Zwanenburg history ===
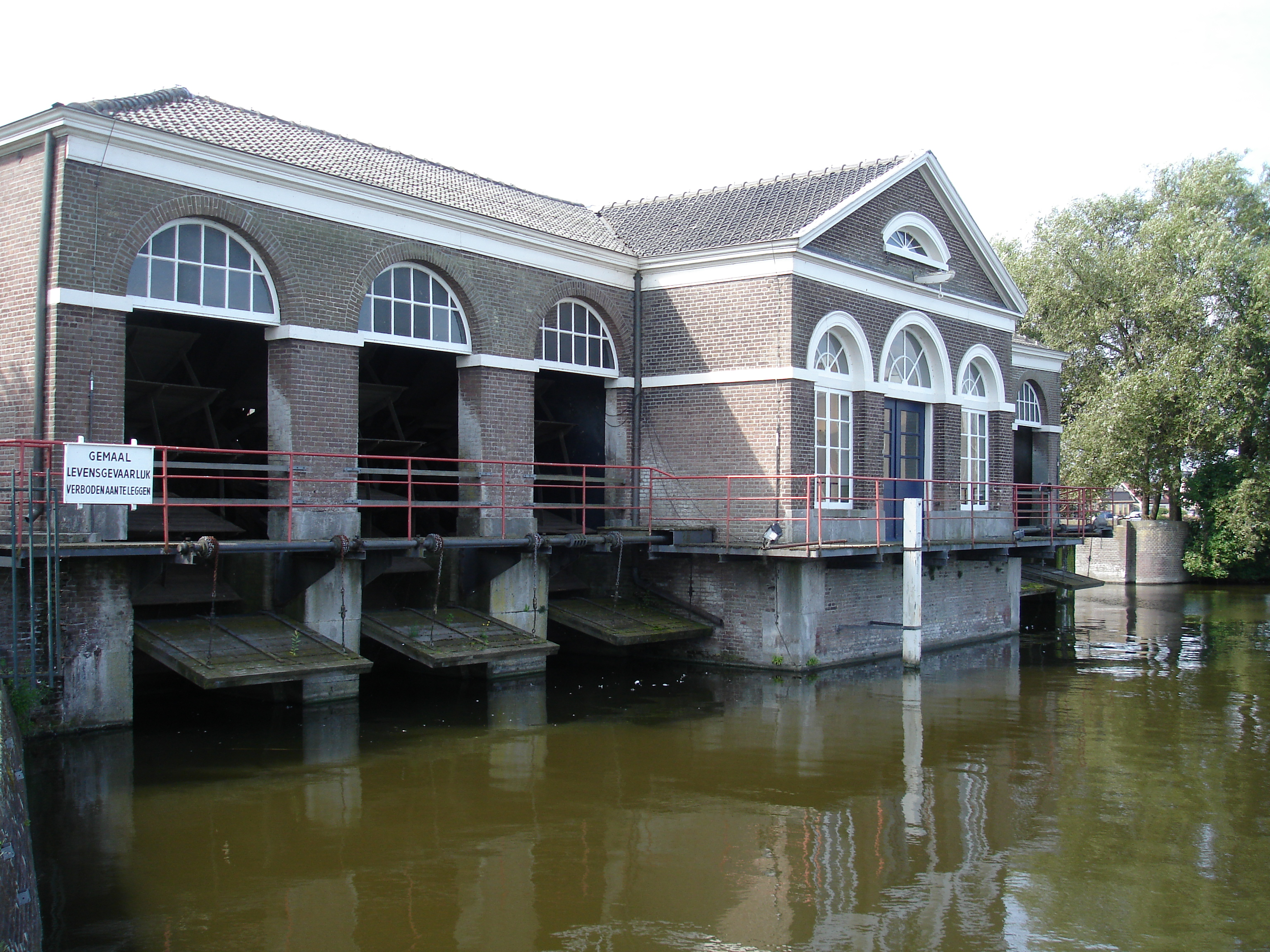
Steam pumping mill at the location of the old sluice; now a museum

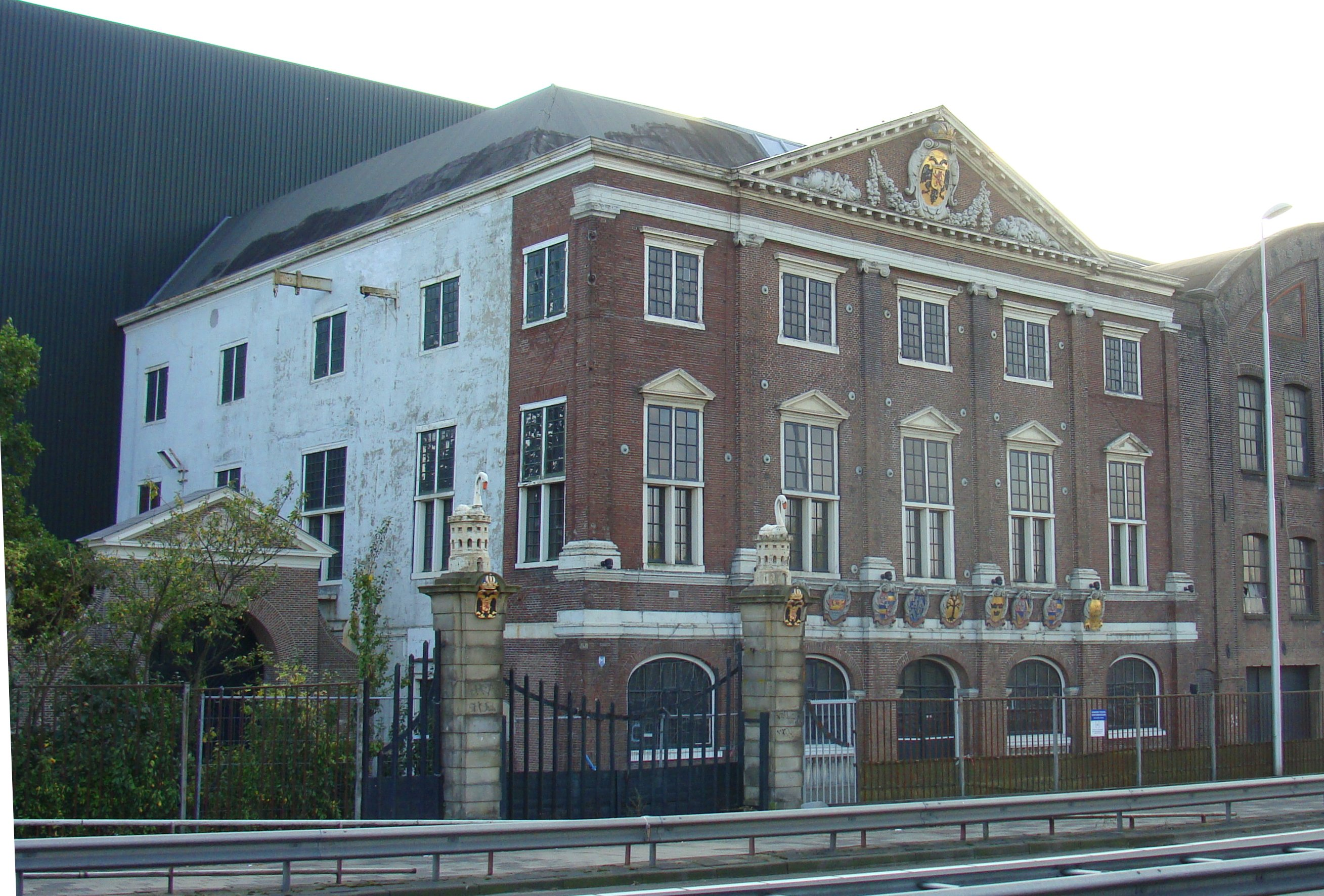
Former headquarters of Hoogheemraadschap van Rijnland

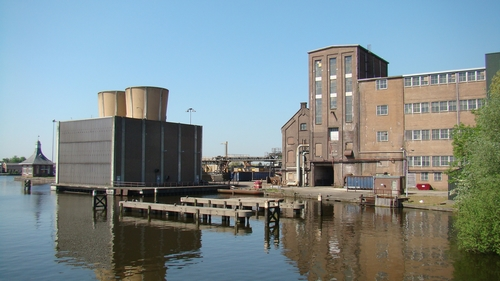
Halfweg sugar factory (silos, not visible, have been transformed into office space)

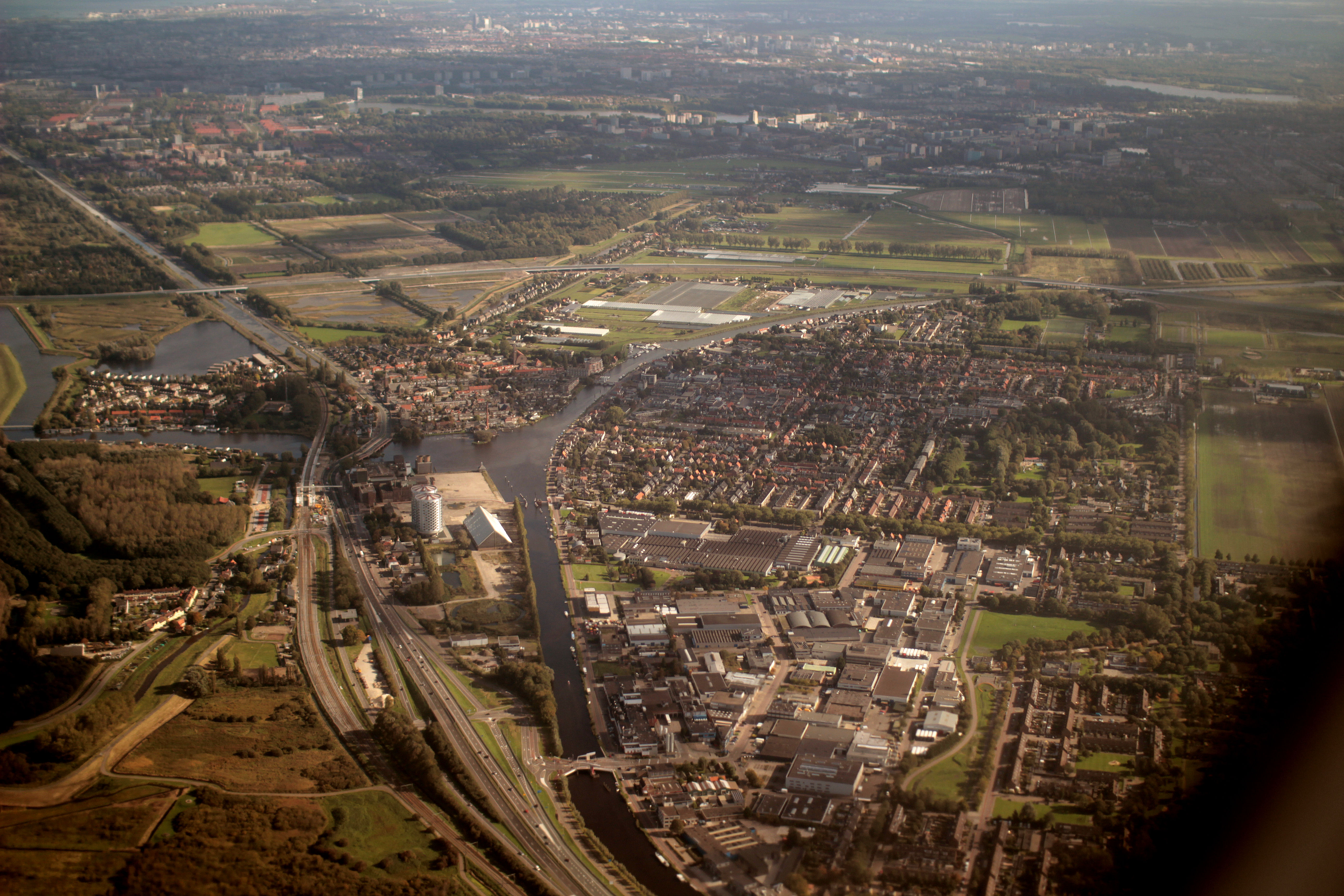
Aerial view of Zwanenburg from the Northwest
