= Basketball Nederland =

Dutch basketball governing body

- Founded: 15 July 1947; 79 years ago
- Affiliation: FIBA Europe
- Headquarters: Nieuwegein
- President: John Voppen

Official website
- basketball.nl

Basketball Netherlands (Dutch: Basketbal Nederland) is the governing body of basketball in the Netherlands. It was founded in 1947, and are headquartered in Nieuwegein.

Basketball Nederland operates the Netherlands men's national team and Netherlands women's national team. They organise national competitions in the Netherlands, for both the men's and women's senior teams, as well as the youth national basketball teams.

The top professional league in the Netherlands is the BNXT League.

== History ==
=== Foundation (1947) ===
The Dutch Basketball Association (Dutch: Nederlandse Basketball Bond, NBB) was founded on 15 July 1947. After World War II in which the Dutch were conquered by the Nazis it began a priority to build governing bodies for their national sports. Even much so that the Netherlands started a basketball federation before basketball power United States. Which didn't establish their own federation until the 1970s.

=== Early years (1947–1961) ===
At the beginning, the NBB started with less than a thousand members and 120 teams from Amsterdam, Haarlem and Rotterdam joined. Basketball was a sport that wasn't practiced all over the country, but especially in Amsterdam. It is logical, therefore, that the NBB derives from the Amsterdam Basketball Federation, founded in 1945.

=== Dutch Basketball Success (1962–1991) ===
During the time period from 1962 to 1991 basketball saw huge growth in the Netherlands. Partially due to the success of the Dutch national team, which made ten European Championship appearances in that span.

Also during this time was the foundation and beginnings of the Dutch Basketball League (DBL). Which received tons of fan support.

=== Regression (1991–2012) ===
During the time period from 1991 to 2012 the national team took a deep decline, and failed to qualify for the European Championship.

In June 2019, the organisation rebranded to Basketball Nederland.

== See also ==
- Netherlands men's national basketball team
- Netherlands men's national under-20 basketball team
- Netherlands men's national under-18 basketball team
- Netherlands men's national under-16 basketball team
- Netherlands men's national 3x3 team
- Netherlands women's national basketball team
- Netherlands women's national under-20 basketball team
- Netherlands women's national under-19 basketball team
- Netherlands women's national under-17 basketball team
- Netherlands women's national 3x3 team
