= FIBA U18 AmeriCup =

Under-18 basketball championship

- Most recent season or competition: 2026 FIBA U18 AmeriCup
- Formerly: FIBA Under-18 Americas Championship; FIBA Americas Under-19 Championship
- Sport: Basketball
- Founded: 1990; 36 years ago
- No. of teams: 8
- Continent: FIBA Americas (Americas)
- Most recent champions: Canada (1st title)
- Most titles: United States (11 titles)
- Qualification: FIBA Under-19 Basketball World Cup
- Related competitions: FIBA U16 AmeriCup
- Website: www.fiba.basketball/history

The FIBA U18 AmeriCup, previously known as the FIBA Under-18 Americas Championship, is the Americas basketball championship for men's under-18 national teams that takes place every two years in the FIBA Americas zone. The top four finishers qualify for the FIBA Under-19 Basketball World Cup.

== Qualification ==
USA and Canada are the only teams who participate in the Under-18 AmeriCup without playing qualifiers. The top three teams from the Under-17 Centrobasket along with the top three teams from the Under-17 South American Championship qualify for this event.

== Summary ==
Year	Host	Gold medal game			Bronze medal game		
Year	Host	Gold	Score	Silver	Bronze	Score	Fourth place
1990	Uruguay (Montevideo)	United States	105–73	Argentina	Brazil	69–61	Uruguay
1994	Argentina (Santa Rosa)	United States	77–72	Argentina	Puerto Rico	70–47	Venezuela
1998	Dominican Republic (Puerto Plata)	United States	91–66	Argentina	Brazil	74–70	Venezuela
2002	Venezuela (Margarita Island)	Puerto Rico	76–53	Venezuela	United States	71–65	Argentina
2006	United States (San Antonio)	United States	104–82	Argentina	Brazil	79–70	Canada
2008	Argentina (Formosa)	Argentina	77–64	United States	Canada	83–68	Puerto Rico
2010	United States (San Antonio)	United States	81–78	Brazil	Canada	86–83 (OT)	Argentina
2012	Brazil (São Sebastião do Paraíso)	United States	81–56	Brazil	Canada	68–66	Argentina
2014	United States (Colorado Springs)	United States	113–79	Canada	Dominican Republic	64–53	Argentina
2016	Chile (Valdivia)	United States	99–84	Canada	Brazil	59–58	Puerto Rico
2018	Canada (St. Catharines)	United States	113–74	Canada	Argentina	87–79	Puerto Rico
2020	Cancelled due to the COVID-19 pandemic in North America and South America						
2022	Mexico (Tijuana)	United States	102–60	Brazil	Canada	81–57	Argentina
2024	Argentina (Buenos Aires)	United States	110–70	Argentina	Canada	89–67	Dominican Republic
2026	Mexico (León)	Canada	67–65	United States	Brazil	83–77	Puerto Rico
2028	TBD (TBD)		–			–	

== Medal table ==
Rank	Nation	Gold	Silver	Bronze	Total
1	United States	11	2	1	14
2	Argentina	1	5	1	7
3	Canada	1	3	5	9
4	Puerto Rico	1	0	1	2
5	Brazil	0	3	5	8
6	Venezuela	0	1	0	1
7	Dominican Republic	0	0	1	1
Totals (7 entries)		14	14	14	42

== Participation details ==
Team	(Uruguay) 1990	(Argentina) 1994	(Dominican Republic) 1998	(Venezuela) 2002	(United States) 2006	(Argentina) 2008	(United States) 2010	(Brazil) 2012	(United States) 2014	(Chile) 2016	(Canada) 2018	(Mexico) 2022	(Argentina) 2024	(Mexico) 2026	2028	Total
Argentina	2nd	2nd	2nd	4th	2nd	1st	4th	4th	4th	5th	3rd	4th	2nd	5th		14
Bahamas	—	—	—	—	7th	8th	—	—	—	—	—	—	—	—		2
Belize	—	—	—	—	—	—	—	—	—	—	—	—	8th	—		1
Brazil	3rd	5th	3rd	6th	3rd	—	2nd	2nd	6th	3rd	—	2nd	5th	3rd		12
Canada	9th	7th	6th	7th	4th	3rd	3rd	3rd	2nd	2nd	2nd	3rd	3rd	1st		14
Chile	—	—	—	—	—	—	—	—	—	6th	5th	—	—	—		2
Colombia	—	—	—	—	—	—	—	8th	—	—	—	—	—	—		1
Costa Rica	10th	—	—	—	—	—	—	—	—	—	—	—	—	—		1
Cuba	6th	—	7th	—	—	—	—	—	—	—	—	—	—	—		2
Dominican Republic	—	6th	5th	5th	—	—	—	—	3rd	8th	6th	7th	4th	7th		9
Ecuador	—	—	—	—	—	—	—	—	—	—	8th	8th	—	—		2
Mexico	—	9th	8th	8th	8th	7th	8th	5th	7th	—	—	6th	—	8th		10
Panama	7th	8th	—	—	—	—	—	—	—	—	7th	—	—	—		3
Puerto Rico	5th	3rd	—	1st	5th	4th	6th	6th	5th	4th	4th	5th	7th	4th		13
United States	1st	1st	1st	3rd	1st	2nd	1st	1st	1st	1st	1st	1st	1st	2nd		14
Uruguay	4th	9th	—	—	6th	6th	5th	—	8th	—	—	—	—	—		6
Venezuela	8th	4th	4th	2nd	—	5th	—	—	—	—	—	—	6th	6th		7
Virgin Islands	—	—	—	—	—	—	7th	7th	—	7th	—	—	—	—		3
Total	10	10	8	8	8	8	8	8	8	8	8	8	8	8	8	

== MVP Awards (since 2014) ==
Year	MVP Award Winner
2014	(United States) Stanley Johnson
2016	(United States) Markelle Fultz
2018	(United States) Quentin Grimes
2022	(United States) Cam Whitmore
2024	(United States) Darius Acuff Jr.
2026	(Canada) Javion Tyndale

== Under-19 World Cup record ==
Team	(Brazil) 1979	(Spain) 1983	(Italy) 1987	(Canada) 1991	(Greece) 1995	(Portugal) 1999	(Greece) 2003	(Serbia) 2007	(New Zealand) 2009	(Latvia) 2011	(Czech Republic) 2013	(Greece) 2015	(Egypt) 2017	(Greece) 2019	(Latvia) 2021	(Hungary) 2023	(Switzerland) 2025	(Czech Republic) 2027	(Indonesia) 2029	Total
Argentina	3rd	7th	—	3rd	6th	4th	10th	6th	5th	4th	12th	10th	8th	11th	8th	5th	12th	—		16
Brazil	2nd	3rd	10th	7th	—	8th	—	4th	—	9th	10th	—	—	—	—	11th	—	Q		10
Canada	7th	14th	6th	8th	—	—	—	10th	7th	11th	6th	5th	1st	8th	3rd	7th	5th	Q		15
Dominican Republic	—	9th	—	—	—	—	—	—	—	—	—	13th	—	—	—	—	15th	—		3
Panama	11th	—	—	—	—	—	—	—	—	—	—	—	—	—	—	—	—	—		1
Puerto Rico	—	—	8th	—	10th	—	6th	16th	6th	—	—	—	9th	6th	14th	—	—	Q		9
United States	1st	1st	2nd	1st	7th	2nd	5th	2nd	1st	5th	1st	1st	3rd	1st	1st	4th	1st	Q		18
Uruguay	8th	12th	—	14th	—	—	—	—	—	—	—	—	—	—	—	—	—	—		3
Venezuela	—	—	—	—	12th	12th	9th	—	—	—	—	—	—	—	—	—	—	—		3
Total	6	6	4	5	4	4	4	5	4	4	4	4	4	4	4	4	4	4	4	

== See also ==
- FIBA Under-16 AmeriCup
- FIBA Under-18 Women's AmeriCup
