= Lester Quiñones =

American-Dominican-Salvadorian basketball player (born 2000)

No. 25 – Sioux Falls Skyforce
- Position: Shooting guard
- League: NBA G League

Personal information
- Born: November 16, 2000 (age 25) Brentwood, New York, U.S.
- Listed height: 6 ft 5 in (1.96 m)
- Listed weight: 208 lb (94 kg)

Career information
- High school: Brentwood (Brentwood, New York); Upper Room Christian School (Dix Hills, New York); St. Benedict's Prep (Newark, New Jersey); IMG Academy (Bradenton, Florida)
- College: Memphis (2019–2022)
- NBA draft: 2022: undrafted
- Playing career: 2022–present

Career history
- 2022–2023: Santa Cruz Warriors
- 2023–2024: Golden State Warriors
- 2023–2024: →Santa Cruz Warriors
- 2024: Philadelphia 76ers
- 2024: →Delaware Blue Coats
- 2024–2025: Birmingham Squadron
- 2025: New Orleans Pelicans
- 2025: →Birmingham Squadron
- 2025–2026: Osceola Magic
- 2026: NBA G League United
- 2026–present: Sioux Falls Skyforce

Career highlights
- FIBA Intercontinental Cup champion (2026); All-NBA G League First Team (2026); NBA G League Most Improved Player (2023); NBA G League All-Rookie Team (2023); AAC All-Freshman team (2020); NIT champion (2021)
- Stats at NBA.com
- Stats at Basketball Reference

Lester Quiñones (/kɪnˈjoʊnɛz/ kin-YOH-nez; born November 16, 2000) is an American-Dominican-Salvadoran professional basketball player for the Sioux Falls Skyforce of the NBA G League. He attended St. Benedict's Preparatory School and played a postgraduate season at IMG Academy. He then played college basketball for the Memphis Tigers.

== Early life and high school career ==
Quiñones grew up in Brentwood, New York and started playing basketball in sixth grade. In his first two years of high school, he attended Brentwood High School. As a junior, Quiñones transferred to Upper Room Christian School in Dix Hills, New York and averaged 19.3 points per game. He was named to the 2017 Long Island Basketball honor roll.

For his senior season, Quiñones moved to St. Benedict's Preparatory School in Newark, New Jersey. He joined a nationally ranked basketball program and became teammates with five-star recruit Precious Achiuwa. On January 7, 2018, Quiñones scored a game-high 23 points in a win over Hudson Catholic Regional High School, the number one team in the NJ.com Top 20 poll. He helped his team to a 28–2 record and a top 10 national ranking by MaxPreps. In the summer, Quiñones played for New Heights alongside Achiuwa, averaging 15.2 points and 4.7 rebounds on the Under Armour Association (UAA) circuit.

Entering the 2018–19 season, he transferred to IMG Academy, a prep school in Bradenton, Florida with a successful basketball program, joining the postgraduate team. Quiñones averaged 24 points, nine rebounds, and six assists per game, shooting 38 percent on three-pointers.

=== Recruiting ===
Quiñones finished his high school and postgraduate career as a consensus four-star recruit. On May 10, 2019, he committed to play college basketball for Memphis under head coach Penny Hardaway. He had also strongly considered playing for Indiana.

College recruiting
Name	Hometown	School	Height	Weight	Commit date
Lester Quiñones; SG	Brentwood, NY	IMG Academy (FL)	6 ft 5 in (1.96 m)	180 lb (82 kg)	May 10, 2019
Lester Quiñones; SG	Recruit ratings: Rivals: 247Sports: ESPN: (84)				
Overall recruit ranking: Rivals: 48 247Sports: 51 ESPN: 82
Note: In many cases, Scout, Rivals, 247Sports, On3, and ESPN may conflict in their listings of height and weight.; In these cases, the average was taken. ESPN grades are on a 100-point scale.; Sources: "Memphis 2019 Basketball Commitments". Rivals.; "2019 Memphis Tigers Recruiting Class". ESPN.; "2019 Team Ranking". Rivals.

== College career ==
With James Wiseman sitting out due to eligibility issues, Quiñones had his first double-double on November 16, 2019, recording 21 points and 10 rebounds in a 102–56 win over Alcorn State. As a result, he was named American Athletic Conference freshman of the week on November 18. Quiñones broke his right hand during a November 23 game against Ole Miss and missed three weeks. At the conclusion of the regular season, Quiñones was named to the American Athletic Conference All-Freshman Team. He averaged 10.7 points, 3.8 rebounds and 2.2 assists per game. After his junior season, Quiñones announced his intentions to leave Memphis and enter the NBA draft.

== Professional career ==
=== Golden State / Santa Cruz Warriors (2022–2024) ===
After going undrafted in the 2022 NBA draft, Quiñones signed a two-way contract with the Golden State Warriors on July 5, 2022. Quiñones debuted for the Warriors' 2022 NBA Summer League team in the NBA California Classic, scoring seven points, five rebounds, and two steals in a 68–86 loss to the Sacramento Kings. He was waived by the Warriors on October 13.

On October 15, 2022, Quiñones signed with the Santa Cruz Warriors of the NBA G League. On February 25, 2023, Quiñones had 42 points and 8 rebounds in a 112–119 loss to the Salt Lake City Stars.

On March 2, 2023, Quiñones signed a 10-day contract with Golden State, but saw no playing time. Ten days later, he was reacquired by Santa Cruz.

On March 17, 2023, Quiñones signed a two-way contract with Golden State. He made his NBA debut on March 31, versus the San Antonio Spurs, playing one minute and securing his first rebound. On April 4, he was named the NBA G League Most Improved Player.

On July 24, 2023, Quiñones signed another two-way contract with the Warriors and on February 22, 2024, he signed a standard contract with Golden State. On March 3, he led the Warriors in points and minutes in a blowout loss to the Boston Celtics.

=== Philadelphia 76ers / Delaware Blue Coats (2024) ===
On September 26, 2024, Quiñones signed a two-way contract with the Philadelphia 76ers. However, he was waived on December 3.

=== Birmingham Squadron / New Orleans Pelicans (2024–2025) ===
On December 6, 2024, Quiñones was acquired by the Birmingham Squadron. His strong performances in the G League culminated in the New Orleans Pelicans signing him to a two-way contract on March 3, 2025. He debuted with the Pelicans on March 24, helping his team secure a 112–99 victory over the Philadelphia 76ers. In nine appearances for the Pelicans, Quiñones averaged 8.6 points, 1.7 rebounds, and 2.6 assists.

=== Osceola Magic and Sioux Falls Skyforce (2025–2026) ===
On August 18, 2025, Quiñones signed an Exhibit 10 contract with the Orlando Magic. He was waived by Orlando on October 18, so he joined the Osceola Magic, Orlando's NBA G League affiliate team, for the 2025–26 season.

On September 27, 2026, Quiñones was traded to the Sioux Falls Skyforce, in a 4-team trade.

== National team career ==
Quiñones plays for the Dominican Republic national team. He joined the under-18 team at the 2018 FIBA Under-18 Americas Championship in St. Catharines, Ontario. In six games, Quiñones averaged 17.5 points, 6.3 rebounds, and 3.5 assists per game, leading his team to sixth place. His best performance came in a loss to Puerto Rico, in which he recorded 31 points and seven three-pointers.

== Personal life ==
Quiñones was born in the United States, but is of Salvadoran, Dominican and Puerto Rican descent. Internationally, he represents the Dominican Republic.

== Career statistics ==
Legend
GP	Games played	GS	Games started	MPG	Minutes per game
FG%	Field goal percentage	3P%	3-point field goal percentage	FT%	Free throw percentage
RPG	Rebounds per game	APG	Assists per game	SPG	Steals per game
BPG	Blocks per game	PPG	Points per game	**Bold**	Career high

=== NBA ===
==== Regular season ====
Year	Team	GP	GS	MPG	FG%	3P%	FT%	RPG	APG	SPG	BPG	PPG
2022–23	Golden State	4	0	4.5	.400	**.500**	.667	.8	.5	**.3**	.0	2.5
2023–24	Golden State	**37**	0	10.6	.397	.364	.690	**1.9**	1.0	.2	.1	4.4
2024–25	Philadelphia	4	0	4.3	**.500**	.000	**1.000**	1.0	.3	.0	.0	2.3
2024–25	New Orleans	9	0	**18.4**	.386	.317	.833	1.7	**2.6**	**.3**	**.2**	**8.6**
Career		54	0	11.0	.397	.346	.729	1.7	1.1	.2	.1	4.8

=== College ===
Year	Team	GP	GS	MPG	FG%	3P%	FT%	RPG	APG	SPG	BPG	PPG
2019–20	Memphis	26	23	**29.4**	.402	.313	**.804**	3.8	**2.2**	.8	.1	**10.7**
2020–21	Memphis	28	28	26.3	.432	**.400**	.672	**5.8**	1.9	.9	**.2**	9.5
2021–22	Memphis	**33**	**30**	27.2	**.449**	.390	.750	3.5	1.3	**1.2**	.1	10.0
Career		87	81	27.6	.429	.369	.752	4.3	1.8	.9	.1	10.1
