= El Salvador men's national under-17 basketball team =

El Salvador
- FIBA zone: FIBA Americas
- National federation: Federación Salvadoreña de Baloncesto

U19 World Cup
- Appearances: None

U18 AmeriCup
- Appearances: None

U17 Centrobasket
- Appearances: 4
- Medals: None

The El Salvador men's national under-17 basketball team is a national basketball team of El Salvador, administered by the Federación Salvadoreña de Baloncesto. It represents the country in men's international under-17 basketball competitions.

== FIBA U17 Centrobasket participations ==
| Year | Result |
|---|---|
| 2013 | 6th |
| 2019 | 8th |
| 2021 | 7th |
| 2023 | 8th |

== See also ==
- El Salvador men's national basketball team
- El Salvador men's national under-15 basketball team
- El Salvador women's national under-17 and under-18 basketball team
