= British Virgin Islands men's national under-17 basketball team =

British Virgin Islands
- FIBA zone: FIBA Americas
- National federation: British Virgin Islands Amateur Basketball Federation

U19 World Cup
- Appearances: None

U18 AmeriCup
- Appearances: None

U17 Centrobasket
- Appearances: 2 (2011, 2013)
- Medals: None

The British Virgin Islands men's national under-17 basketball team is a national basketball team of the British Virgin Islands, administered by the British Virgin Islands Amateur Basketball Federation. It represents the country in men's international under-17 basketball competitions.

In 2008, the team also participated at the former CBC U18 Championship, where they won the bronze medal.

== FIBA U17 Centrobasket participations ==
Year	Result
2011	7th
2013	7th

== See also ==
- British Virgin Islands men's national basketball team
