= Cuba men's national under-18 basketball team =

Cuba
- FIBA zone: FIBA Americas
- National federation: Federación Cubana de Baloncesto

U19 World Cup
- Appearances: None

U18 AmeriCup
- Appearances: 2 (1990, 1998)
- Medals: None

U17 Centrobasket
- Appearances: None

The Cuba men's national under-18 basketball team is a national basketball team of Cuba, administered by the Federación Cubana de Baloncesto. It represents the country in men's international under-18 basketball competitions.

== FIBA Under-18 AmeriCup participations ==
Year	Result
1990	6th
1998	7th

== See also ==
- Cuba men's national basketball team
- Cuba women's national under-19 basketball team
