= Jamaica men's national under-17 basketball team =

Jamaica
- FIBA zone: FIBA Americas
- National federation: Jamaica Basketball Association

U19 World Cup
- Appearances: None

U18 AmeriCup
- Appearances: None

U17 Centrobasket
- Appearances: 4
- Medals: None

The Jamaica men's national under-17 basketball team is a national basketball team of Jamaica, administered by the Jamaica Basketball Association. It represents the country in men's international under-17 basketball competitions.

In 2005, the team also participated at the former CBC U18 Championship, where they finished in fifth place.

== FIBA U17 Centrobasket participations ==
Year	Result
2017	6th
2019	7th
2021	6th
2023	6th

== See also ==
- Jamaica men's national basketball team
