= Nicaragua women's national under-19 basketball team =

Nicaragua
- FIBA zone: FIBA Americas
- National federation: Federación Nicaraguense de Baloncesto

The Nicaragua women's national under-19 basketball team was a national basketball team of Nicaragua, administered by the Federación Nicaraguense de Baloncesto.

The team represented the country at the 2005 COCABA U19 Championship for Women, where they finished in the third place.
