= Belize men's national under-17 and under-18 basketball team =

Belize
- FIBA zone: FIBA Americas
- National federation: Belize National Basketball Association

U19 World Cup
- Appearances: None

U18 AmeriCup
- Appearances: 1 (2024)
- Medals: None

U17 Centrobasket
- Appearances: 2
- Medals: (bronze) Bronze: 1 (2023)

The Belize men's national under-17 and under-18 basketball team is a national basketball team of Belize, administered by the Belize National Basketball Association. It represents the country in international under-17 and under-18 basketball competitions.

== FIBA U17 Centrobasket participations ==
Year	Result
2011	6th
2023	3rd place, bronze medalist(s)

== FIBA Under-18 AmeriCup participations ==
Year	Result
2024	8th

== See also ==
- Belize men's national basketball team
