= Canada men's national under-19 basketball team =

Canada
- FIBA zone: FIBA Americas
- National federation: Canada Basketball
- Coach: Paul Weir

FIBA Under-19 World Cup
- Appearances: 14
- Medals: (gold) Gold: 2017; (bronze) Bronze: 2021

FIBA Under-18 AmeriCup
- Appearances: 14
- Medals: (gold) Gold: 2026; (silver) Silver: 2014, 2016, 2018; (bronze) Bronze: 2008, 2010, 2012, 2022, 2024
| Home | Away |

The Canada men's national under-18 and under-19 basketball team represents Canada in international under-18 and under-19 basketball competitions. They are overseen by Canada Basketball, the governing body for basketball in Canada.

The 2017 team won the Canadian Press Team of the Year Award, becoming the first basketball team to win the award.

A prominent member was RJ Barrett who helped his country win the 2017 FIBA Under-19 Basketball World Cup, where he became the tournament's MVP. The head coach Roy Rana in later years would become an NBA assistant coach and Head Coach of the Egyptian men's national basketball team.

== Competitive record ==
A red box around the year indicates tournaments played within the Canada

=== FIBA Under-19 World Cup ===
| Year | Result | Position | Pld | W | L | Ref |
|---|---|---|---|---|---|---|
| (Brazil) 1979 | Consolation round | 7th | 8 | 4 | 4 | |
| (Spain) 1983 | Consolation round | 14th | 7 | 1 | 6 | |
| (Italy) 1987 | Consolation round | 6th | 7 | 4 | 3 | |
| (Canada) 1991 | Consolation round | 8th | 8 | 2 | 6 | |
| (Greece) 1995 | Did not qualify | | | | | |
| (Portugal) 1999 | Did not qualify | | | | | |
| (Greece) 2003 | Did not qualify | | | | | |
| (Serbia) 2007 | Consolation round | 10th | 8 | 4 | 4 | |
| (New Zealand) 2009 | Quarterfinals | 7th | 9 | 4 | 5 | |
| (Latvia) 2011 | Consolation round | 11th | 8 | 3 | 5 | |
| (Czech Republic) 2013 | Quarterfinals | 6th | 9 | 4 | 5 | |
| (Greece) 2015 | Quarterfinals | 5th | 7 | 6 | 1 | |
| (Egypt) 2017 | Champions | 1st | 7 | 6 | 1 | |
| (Greece) 2019 | Quarterfinals | 8th | 7 | 3 | 4 | |
| (Latvia) 2021 | Semifinals | 3rd | 7 | 6 | 1 | |
| (Hungary) 2023 | Quarterfinals | 7th | 7 | 3 | 4 | |
| (Switzerland) 2025 | Quarterfinals | 5th | 7 | 5 | 2 | |
| (Czech Republic) 2027 | Qualified | | | | | |
| (Indonesia) 2029 | To be determined | | | | | |
| Total | 1 title | 14/19 | 106 | 55 | 51 | — |

=== FIBA Under-18 AmeriCup ===
| Year | Result | Position | Pld | W | L | Ref |
|---|---|---|---|---|---|---|
| (Uruguay) 1990 | Consolation round | 9th | 5 | 1 | 4 | |
| (Argentina) 1994 | Quarterfinals | 7th | 8 | 2 | 6 | |
| (Dominican Republic) 1998 | Consolation round | 6th | 4 | 1 | 3 | |
| (Venezuela) 2002 | Consolation round | 7th | 5 | 1 | 4 | |
| (United States) 2006 | Semifinals | 4th | 5 | 2 | 3 | |
| (Argentina) 2008 | Semifinals | 3rd | 5 | 3 | 2 | |
| (United States) 2010 | Semifinals | 3rd | 5 | 3 | 2 | |
| (Brazil) 2012 | Semifinals | 3rd | 5 | 4 | 1 | |
| (United States) 2014 | Final | 2nd | 5 | 4 | 1 | |
| (Chile) 2016 | Final | 2nd | 5 | 4 | 1 | |
| (Canada) 2018 | Final | 2nd | 6 | 5 | 1 | |
| (Mexico) 2022 | Semifinals | 3rd | 6 | 4 | 2 | |
| (Argentina) 2024 | Semifinals | 3rd | 6 | 4 | 2 | |
| (Mexico) 2026 | Champions | 1st | 5 | 5 | 0 | |
| Total | 1 title | 14/14 | 75 | 43 | 32 | — |

== See also ==
- Canada men's national basketball team
- Canada men's national under-17 basketball team
- Canada women's national under-19 basketball team
