= Puerto Rico men's national under-19 basketball team =

Puerto Rico
- FIBA zone: FIBA Americas
- National federation: Puerto Rican Basketball Federation

U19 World Cup
- Appearances: 8
- Medals: None

U18 AmeriCup
- Appearances: 13
- Medals: (gold) Gold: 1 (2002); (bronze) Bronze: 1 (1994)

U17 Centrobasket
- Appearances: 9
- Medals: (gold) Gold: 6 (2007, 2009, 2011, 2015, 2021, 2023); (silver) Silver: 3 (2013, 2017, 2019)

The Puerto Rico men's national under-17, under-18 and under-19 basketball team is a national basketball team of Puerto Rico, administered by the Puerto Rican Basketball Federation. It represents the country in men's international under-17, under-18 and under-19 basketball competitions.

== FIBA U17 Centrobasket participations ==
Year	Result
2007	1st place, gold medalist(s)
2009	1st place, gold medalist(s)
2011	1st place, gold medalist(s)
2013	2nd place, silver medalist(s)
2015	1st place, gold medalist(s)
2017	2nd place, silver medalist(s)
2019	2nd place, silver medalist(s)
2021	1st place, gold medalist(s)
2023	1st place, gold medalist(s)

== FIBA Under-18 AmeriCup participations ==
Year	Result
1990	5th
1994	3rd place, bronze medalist(s)
2002	1st place, gold medalist(s)
2006	5th
2008	4th
2010	6th
2012	6th
2014	5th
2016	4th
2018	4th
2022	5th
2024	7th
2026	4th

== FIBA U19 World Cup record ==
Year	Position	Pld	W	L
(Brazil) 1979	Did not qualify			
(Spain) 1983	Did not qualify			
(Italy) 1987	8th	7	3	4
(Canada) 1991	Did not qualify			
(Greece) 1995	10th	8	5	3
(Portugal) 1999	Did not qualify			
(Greece) 2003	6th	8	3	5
(Serbia) 2007	16th	5	0	5
(New Zealand) 2009	6th	9	5	4
(Latvia) 2011	Did not qualify			
(Czech Republic) 2013	Did not qualify			
(Greece) 2015	Did not qualify			
(Egypt) 2017	9th	7	3	4
(Greece) 2019	6th	7	2	5
(Latvia) 2021	14th	7	2	5
(Hungary) 2023	Did not qualify			
(Switzerland) 2025	Did not qualify			
(Czech Republic) 2027	Qualified			
(Indonesia) 2029	To be determined			
Total	8/19	58	23	35

== See also ==
- Puerto Rico men's national basketball team
- Puerto Rico men's national under-17 basketball team
- Puerto Rico women's national under-19 basketball team
