= 2016 FIBA Americas Under-18 Championship =

2016 FIBA U18 AmeriCup
10th FIBA Under-18 Americas Basketball Championship

Tournament details
- Host country: Chile
- Dates: 19–23 July
- Teams: 8
- Venue: 1 (in 1 host city)

Final positions
- Champions: United States (8th title)

Tournament statistics
- MVP: (United States) Markelle Fultz
- Top scorer: (Canada) Alexander-Walker (17.4)
- Top rebounds: (Puerto Rico) Negrón (13.6)
- Top assists: (Canada) Gilgeous-Alexander (5.4)
- PPG (Team): United States (93.4)
- RPG (Team): Brazil (54.8)
- APG (Team): United States (25.0)

Official website
- 2016 FIBA Americas Under-18 Championship

The 2016 FIBA Americas Under-18 Championship for Men was an international basketball competition that was held in Valdivia, Chile from July 19–23, 2016. It was the tenth edition of the championship, and was the FIBA Americas qualifying tournament for the 2017 FIBA Under-19 World Championship. Eight national teams from across the Americas, composed of men aged 19 and under, competed in the tournament. The United States won their fourth consecutive gold medal, and eighth overall, in this event by beating Canada in the final, 99–84.

== Participating teams ==
- North America:
  - United States
  - Canada
- Central America/Caribbean:
  - Puerto Rico
  - Virgin Islands
  - Dominican Republic
- South America:
  - Argentina
  - Brazil
  - Chile (Hosts)

== Preliminary round ==
The draw was held on 14 April 2016.

All times are local (UTC-4).

=== Group A ===
Pos	Team	Pld	W	L	PF	PA	PD	Pts	Qualification
1	Canada	3	3	0	253	190	+63	6	Advance to Semifinals
2	Brazil	3	2	1	186	183	+3	5	Advance to Semifinals
3	Argentina	3	1	2	188	221	−33	4	Classification 5-8
4	Dominican Republic	3	0	3	207	240	−33	3	Classification 5-8

Source: Standings
Rules for classification: 1) Points; 2) Head-to-head results; 3) Points difference; 4) Points scored.

19 July
15:45

Boxscore

Argentina	58–92	Canada
Scoring by quarter: 16–17, 15–29, 10–29, 17–17
Pts: Berra 14; Rebs: Acosta 8 Asts: Lopez 3		Pts: Wigginton 21; Rebs: Shephard 7 Asts: Gilgeous-Alexander 5

Coliseo Municipal de Valdivia, Valdivia
Referees: Jesed Diaz (PUR), Matthew Myers (USA), Karol Quinones (CHI)

19 July
18:00

Boxscore

Dominican Republic	58–74	Brazil
Scoring by quarter: 13–19, 11–20, 12–18, 22–17
Pts: Vitiello 14; Rebs: Perez 7 Asts: Pena 2		Pts: Galvanini 25; Rebs: Pereira 9 Asts: Ruivo 9

Coliseo Municipal de Valdivia, Valdivia
Referees: Georgios Poursanidis (GRE), Kendell Henry (ISV), Felipe Valenzuela (CHI)

20 July
13:30

Boxscore

Canada	87–74	Dominican Republic
Scoring by quarter: 20–12, 21–15, 28–28, 18–19
Pts: Brissett 23; Rebs: Brissett 12; Asts: Wigginton 5		Pts: Figueroa 22; Rebs: Pena 9 Asts: Perez 3

Coliseo Municipal de Valdivia, Valdivia
Referees: Matthew Myers (USA), Kendell Henry (ISV), Karol Quinones (CHI)

20 July
18:00

Boxscore

Brazil	54–51	Argentina
Scoring by quarter: 11–12, 13–13, 18–9, 12–17
Pts: Santos 11; Rebs: Uchendu 20; Asts: Ruivo 3		Pts: Solanas 12; Rebs: Andreatta 8 Asts: Corvalan 3

Coliseo Municipal de Valdivia, Valdivia
Referees: Jesed Diaz (PUR), Alejandra Gaytan (MEX), Felipe Valenzuela (CHI)

21 July
13:30

Boxscore

Brazil	58–74	Canada
Scoring by quarter: 13–15, 18–11, 15–29, 12–19
Pts: Uchendu 14; Rebs: Uchendu 12; Asts: Ruivo 4		Pts: Brissett 19; Rebs: Wigginton 6 Asts: Gilgeous-Alexander 12

Coliseo Municipal de Valdivia, Valdivia
Referees: Georgios Poursanidis (GRE), Jesed Diaz (PUR), Kendell Henry (ISV)

21 July
18:00

Boxscore

Argentina	79–75	Dominican Republic
Scoring by quarter: 17–18, 22–14, 19–32, 21–11
Pts: Corvalan 22; Rebs: Roitman 12; Asts: Corvalan 10		Pts: Perez 21; Rebs: Waldron 12; Asts: Vitiello 5

Coliseo Municipal de Valdivia, Valdivia
Referees: Matthew Myers (USA), Karol Quinones (CHI), Felipe Valenzuela (CHI)

=== Group B ===
Pos	Team	Pld	W	L	PF	PA	PD	Pts	Qualification
1	United States	3	3	0	280	183	+97	6	Advance to Semifinals
2	Puerto Rico	3	2	1	225	224	+1	5	Advance to Semifinals
3	Chile	3	1	2	178	185	−7	4	Classification 5-8
4	Virgin Islands	3	0	3	169	260	−91	3	Classification 5-8

Source: Standings
Rules for classification: 1) Points; 2) Head-to-head results; 3) Points difference; 4) Points scored.

19 July
13:30

Boxscore

Puerto Rico	70–103	United States
Scoring by quarter: 11–20, 15–26, 26–33, 18–24
Pts: Negrón 23; Rebs: Negrón 13; Asts: Jackson 5		Pts: Porter Jr. 20; Rebs: Washington 10; Asts: Young 5

Coliseo Municipal de Valdivia, Valdivia
Referees: Leonardo Salazar (ARG), Andres Laulhe (URU), Bruno da Costa (BRA)

19 July
20:15

Boxscore

Chile	68–45	Virgin Islands
Scoring by quarter: 17–4, 12–14, 15–14, 24–13
Pts: Arroyo 16; Rebs: Torres 8 Asts: Aguirre 7		Pts: Claxton 9 Rebs: Claxton 9 Asts: Stevens 5

Coliseo Municipal de Valdivia, Valdivia
Referees: Maximo Cruz (DOM), Alejandra Mota (MEX), Michael Scott (CAN)

20 July
15:45

Boxscore

Virgin Islands	63–107	United States
Scoring by quarter: 18–30, 17–28, 17–27, 11–22
Pts: Stevens 18; Rebs: Simmons 6 Asts: Stevens 4		Pts: Porter Jr. 20; Rebs: Allen 10; Asts: Young 7

Coliseo Municipal de Valdivia, Valdivia
Referees: Maximo Cruz (DOM), Bruno Da Costa (BRA), Andres Laulhe (URU)

20 July
20:15

Boxscore

Puerto Rico	70–60	Chile
Scoring by quarter: 14–15, 14–17, 22–19, 20–9
Pts: Cruz 15; Rebs: C. Negron 10; Asts: Washington 3		Pts: Aguirre 15; Rebs: Soulodre 10; Asts: Aguirre 4

Coliseo Municipal de Valdivia, Valdivia
Referees: Georgios Poursanidis (GRE), Michael Scott (CAN), Leonardo Zalazar (ARG)

21 July
15:45

Boxscore

Virgin Islands	61–85	Puerto Rico
Scoring by quarter: 19–14, 12–21, 23–26, 7–24
Pts: Farrington 17; Rebs: Simmons 12; Asts: Stevens 4		Pts: Thompson 24; Rebs: C. Negron 11; Asts: Cruz 3

Coliseo Municipal de Valdivia, Valdivia
Referees: Maximo Cruz (DOM), Bruno Da Costa (BRA), Alejandra Gaytan (MEX)

21 July
20:15

Boxscore

Chile	50–70	United States
Scoring by quarter: 14–9, 13–21, 13–20, 10–20
Pts: Arroyo 14; Rebs: Lorca 13; Asts: Aguirre 4		Pts: Huerter 14; Rebs: Bamba 9 Asts: Coleman 6

Coliseo Municipal de Valdivia, Valdivia
Referees: Leonardo Zalazar (ARG), Andres Laulhe (URU), Michael Scott (CAN)

== Classification round ==
All times are local (UTC-4).

5th–8th
22 July
Argentina	91
Virgin Islands	79
22 July
Chile	72
Dominican Republic	69

Fifth place
23 July
Argentina	73
Chile	68
Seventh place
23 July
Virgin Islands	77
Dominican Republic	63

=== Classification 5–8 ===
22 July
13:30

Boxscore

Argentina	91–79	Virgin Islands
Scoring by quarter: 17–20, 29–20, 26–25, 19–14
Pts: Corvalan 18; Rebs: Berra 6 Asts: Corvalan 8		Pts: Simmons 22; Rebs: Simmons 16; Asts: Joseph 3

Coliseo Municipal de Valdivia, Valdivia
Referees: Michael Scott (CAN), Andres Laulhe (URU), Karol Quinones (CHI)

22 July
15:45

Boxscore

Chile	72–69	Dominican Republic
Scoring by quarter: 16–14, 19–17, 21–16, 16–22
Pts: Arroyo 22; Rebs: Arroyo 10; Asts: Aguirre 5		Pts: Figueroa 25; Rebs: Figueroa 15; Asts: Vitiello 5

Coliseo Municipal de Valdivia, Valdivia
Referees: Matthew Myers (USA), Bruno Da Costa (BRA), Jesed Diaz (PUR)

=== Seventh place game ===
23 July
13:30

Boxscore

Virgin Islands	77–63	Dominican Republic
Scoring by quarter: 24–24, 14–12, 25–9, 14–18
Pts: Claxton 17; Rebs: Simmons 16; Asts: Joseph 5		Pts: Familia 15; Rebs: Familia 10; Asts: Rivera 3

Coliseo Municipal de Valdivia, Valdivia
Referees: Andres Laulhe (URU), Bruno Da Costa (BRA), Karol Quinones (CHI)

=== Fifth place game ===
23 July
15:45

Boxscore

Argentina	73–68	Chile
Scoring by quarter: 18–14, 24–19, 17–19, 14–16
Pts: Lopez 13; Rebs: Andreatta 8 Asts: Lopez 5		Pts: Haase 18; Rebs: Haase 6 Asts: Aguirre 5

Coliseo Municipal de Valdivia, Valdivia
Referees: Georgios Poursanidis (GRE), Maximo Cruz (DOM), Michael Scott (CAN)

== Final round ==
All times are local (UTC-4).

Semifinals
22 July
Canada	83
Puerto Rico	66
22 July
United States	88
Brazil	48

Final
23 July
Canada	84
United States	99
Third place
23 July
Puerto Rico	58
Brazil	59

=== Semifinals ===
22 July
18:00

Boxscore

Canada	83–66	Puerto Rico
Scoring by quarter: 20–9, 25–19, 19–19, 19–19
Pts: Wigginton 22; Rebs: Brissett 8 Asts: Wigginton 5		Pts: Jackson 15; Rebs: C. Negron 11; Asts: Pacheco 2

Coliseo Municipal de Valdivia, Valdivia
Referees: Leonardo Zalazar (ARG), Maximo Cruz (DOM), Alejandra Gaytan (MEX)

22 July
20:15

Boxscore

United States	88–48	Brazil
Scoring by quarter: 23–14, 17–12, 33–12, 15–10
Pts: Porter Jr. 17; Rebs: Allen 10; Asts: Fultz 11		Pts: Y. Dos Santos 7 Rebs: Y. Dos Santos 6 Asts: Y. Dos Santos 4

Coliseo Municipal de Valdivia, Valdivia
Referees: Georgios Poursanidis (GRE), Kendell Henry (ISV), Felipe Valenzuela (CHI)

=== Third place game ===
23 July
18:00

Boxscore

Puerto Rico	58–59	Brazil
Scoring by quarter: 15–14, 13–11, 18–17, 12–17
Pts: Allende 15; Rebs: C. Negron 23; Asts: Pacheco 4		Pts: Pereira 16; Rebs: Pereira 16; Asts: Santos 5

Coliseo Municipal de Valdivia, Valdivia
Referees: Matthew Myers (USA), Alejandra Gaytan (MEX), Felipe Valenzuela (CHI)

=== Final ===
23 July
20:15

Boxscore

Canada	84–99	United States
Scoring by quarter: 23–24, 21–24, 19–27, 21–24
Pts: Alexander-Walker 25; Rebs: Kigab 10; Asts: Henry 4		Pts: Fultz 23; Rebs: Coleman 9 Asts: Fultz 5

Coliseo Municipal de Valdivia, Valdivia
Referees: Jesed Diaz (PUR), Kendell Henry (ISV), Leonardo Zalazar (ARG)

== Awards ==
2016 FIBA Americas Under-18
Championship winners

United States
8th title

Most Valuable Player
(United States) Markelle Fultz

== Final ranking ==
Qualified for the 2017 FIBA Under-19 Basketball World Cup
Suspended from the 2017 FIBA Under-19 Basketball World Cup

Rank	Team	Record
1st place, gold medalist(s)	United States	5–0
2nd place, silver medalist(s)	Canada	4–1
3rd place, bronze medalist(s)	Brazil*	3–2
4	Puerto Rico	2–3
5	Argentina	3–2
6	Chile	2–3
7	Virgin Islands	1–4
8	Dominican Republic	0–5

* Brazil qualified for the tournament but was suspended by FIBA. A fourth team from FIBA Americas had to be named to take Brazil's place. The draw took place with the fourth FIBA Americas team's identity yet to be named. On 12 May 2017, Argentina was chosen to replace Brazil.
