= Mexico men's national under-17 and under-18 basketball team =

Mexico
- FIBA zone: FIBA Americas
- National federation: Asociación Deportiva Mexicana de Básquetbol

U19 World Cup
- Appearances: None

U18 AmeriCup
- Appearances: 10
- Medals: None

U17 Centrobasket
- Appearances: 9
- Medals: (gold) Gold: 1 (2019); (silver) Silver: 4 (2007, 2009, 2011, 2021); (bronze) Bronze: 1 (2013)
Home	Away

The Mexico men's national under-17 and under-18 basketball team is a national basketball team of Mexico, administered by the Asociación Deportiva Mexicana de Básquetbol ADEMEBA (Mexican Basketball Association). It represents the country in international under-17 and under-18 basketball competitions.

== FIBA U17 Centrobasket participations ==
Year	Result
2007	2nd place, silver medalist(s)
2009	2nd place, silver medalist(s)
2011	2nd place, silver medalist(s)
2013	3rd place, bronze medalist(s)
2015	4th
2017	4th
2019	1st place, gold medalist(s)
2021	2nd place, silver medalist(s)
2023	4th

== FIBA Under-18 AmeriCup participations ==
Year	Result
1994	9th
1998	8th
2002	8th
2006	8th
2008	7th
2010	8th
2012	5th
2014	7th
2022	6th
2026	8th

== See also ==
- Mexico men's national basketball team
- Mexico men's national under-15 and under-16 basketball team
- Mexico women's national under-19 basketball team
- Mexico men's national 3x3 team
