= Bahamas men's national under-17 and under-18 basketball team =

Bahamas
- FIBA zone: FIBA Americas
- National federation: Bahamas Basketball Federation

U19 World Cup
- Appearances: None

U18 AmeriCup
- Appearances: 2 (2006, 2008)
- Medals: None

U17 Centrobasket
- Appearances: 7
- Medals: (bronze) Bronze: 1 (2019)

The Bahamas men's national under-17 and under-18 basketball team is a national basketball team of The Bahamas, administered by the Bahamas Basketball Federation. It represents the country in international under-17 and under-18 basketball competitions.

== FIBA U17 Centrobasket participations ==
Year	Result
2007	4th
2009	5th
2011	4th
2013	5th
2015	5th
2017	7th
2019	3rd place, bronze medalist(s)

== FIBA Under-18 AmeriCup participations ==
Year	Result
2006	7th
2008	8th

== See also ==
- Bahamas men's national basketball team
- Bahamas men's national under-15 and under-16 basketball team
- Bahamas women's national under-17 basketball team
