= Costa Rica men's national under-17 and under-18 basketball team =

Costa Rica
- FIBA zone: FIBA Americas
- National federation: Federación Costarricense de Baloncesto Aficionado

U19 World Cup
- Appearances: None

U18 AmeriCup
- Appearances: 1 (1990)
- Medals: None

U17 Centrobasket
- Appearances: 4
- Medals: None

The Costa Rica men's national under-17 and under-18 basketball team is a national basketball team of Costa Rica, administered by the Federación Costarricense de Baloncesto Aficionado. It represents the country in international under-17 and under-18 basketball competitions.

== FIBA U17 Centrobasket participations ==
Year	Result
2013	8th
2015	7th
2021	4th
2023	7th

== FIBA Under-18 AmeriCup history ==
So far, the team's only participation at the FIBA Under-18 AmeriCup was in 1990, where they finished in 10th place.

== See also ==
- Costa Rica men's national basketball team
- Costa Rica men's national under-15 and under-16 basketball team
- Costa Rica women's national under-17 and under-18 basketball team
