= 2019 FIBA U17 Centrobasket =

Tournament details
- Host country: Puerto Rico
- City: San Juan
- Dates: 24–28 July 2019
- Teams: 8 (from 1 confederation)
- Venue(s): 1 (in 1 host city)

Final positions
- Champions: Mexico (1st title)
- Runners-up: Puerto Rico
- Third place: Bahamas

Official website
- www.fiba.basketball/history

The 2019 FIBA U17 Centrobasket was the seventh edition of the Central American and Caribbean basketball championship for men's under-17 national teams. The tournament was played at Roberto Clemente Coliseum in San Juan, Puerto Rico, from 24 to 28 July 2019.

== Participating teams ==
- Bahamas
- Dominican Republic
- El Salvador
- Jamaica
- Mexico
- Panama
- Puerto Rico
- Virgin Islands

== Group phase ==
In this round, the teams were drawn into two groups of four. The top two teams from each group advanced to the semifinals; the other teams advanced to the 5th–8th place playoffs.

All times are local (Atlantic Standard Time – UTC-4).

=== Group A ===
Pos	Team	Pld	W	L	PF	PA	PD	Pts	Qualification
1	Puerto Rico	3	3	0	266	181	+85	6	Semifinals
2	Bahamas	3	2	1	245	208	+37	5	Semifinals
3	Virgin Islands	3	1	2	226	246	−20	4	5th–8th place playoffs
4	El Salvador	3	0	3	170	272	−102	3	5th–8th place playoffs

Source: FIBA

24 July 2019
18:30

Boxscore

Virgin Islands	90–62	El Salvador
Scoring by quarter: 19–13, 23–18, 24–12, 24–19

Roberto Clemente Coliseum, San Juan

24 July 2019
20:30

Boxscore

Bahamas	70–75	Puerto Rico
Scoring by quarter: 17–16, 12–22, 18–22, 23–15

Roberto Clemente Coliseum, San Juan

25 July 2019
17:45

Boxscore

El Salvador	57–86	Bahamas
Scoring by quarter: 12–21, 13–26, 11–16, 21–23

Roberto Clemente Coliseum, San Juan

25 July 2019
20:00

Boxscore

Puerto Rico	95–60	Virgin Islands
Scoring by quarter: 24–12, 13–21, 35–10, 23–17

Roberto Clemente Coliseum, San Juan

26 July 2019
17:45

Boxscore

Virgin Islands	76–89	Bahamas
Scoring by quarter: 15–15, 19–19, 21–24, 21–31

Roberto Clemente Coliseum, San Juan

26 July 2019
20:00

Boxscore

Puerto Rico	96–51	El Salvador
Scoring by quarter: 31–6, 24–15, 23–12, 18–18

Roberto Clemente Coliseum, San Juan

=== Group B ===
Pos	Team	Pld	W	L	PF	PA	PD	Pts	Qualification
1	Mexico	3	3	0	276	185	+91	6	Semifinals
2	Dominican Republic	3	2	1	289	206	+83	5	Semifinals
3	Panama	3	1	2	267	257	+10	4	5th–8th place playoffs
4	Jamaica	3	0	3	156	340	−184	3	5th–8th place playoffs

Source: FIBA

24 July 2019
13:00

Boxscore

Mexico	100–38	Jamaica
Scoring by quarter: –, –, –, –

Roberto Clemente Coliseum, San Juan

24 July 2019
15:15

Boxscore

Panama	74–95	Dominican Republic
Scoring by quarter: 17–29, 20–25, 19–21, 18–20

Roberto Clemente Coliseum, San Juan

25 July 2019
13:00

Boxscore

Jamaica	69–125	Panama
Scoring by quarter: 16–32, 22–27, 15–27, 16–39

Roberto Clemente Coliseum, San Juan

25 July 2019
15:15

Boxscore

Dominican Republic	79–83	Mexico
Scoring by quarter: 16–20, 19–15, 28–11, 16–37

Roberto Clemente Coliseum, San Juan

26 July 2019
13:00

Boxscore

Dominican Republic	115–49	Jamaica
Scoring by quarter: 28–16, 31–14, 25–11, 31–8

Roberto Clemente Coliseum, San Juan

26 July 2019
15:15

Boxscore

Mexico	93–68	Panama
Scoring by quarter: 28–10, 16–11, 23–18, 26–29

Roberto Clemente Coliseum, San Juan

== 5th–8th place playoffs ==
5th–8th place semifinals
A3	Virgin Islands	104
B4	Jamaica	86
B3	Panama	99
A4	El Salvador	41

5th place match
A3	Virgin Islands	75
B3	Panama	76
7th place match
B4	Jamaica	65
A4	El Salvador	63

=== 5th–8th place semifinals ===
27 July 2019
13:00

Boxscore

Virgin Islands	104–86	Jamaica
Scoring by quarter: 17–23, 23–18, 32–14, 32–31

Roberto Clemente Coliseum, San Juan

27 July 2019
15:15

Boxscore

Panama	99–41	El Salvador
Scoring by quarter: 25–9, 20–9, 30–3, 24–20

Roberto Clemente Coliseum, San Juan

=== 7th place match ===
28 July 2019
13:00

Boxscore

Jamaica	65–63	El Salvador
Scoring by quarter: 14–13, 16–24, 15–11, 20–15

Roberto Clemente Coliseum, San Juan

=== 5th place match ===
28 July 2019
15:15

Boxscore

Virgin Islands	75–76	Panama
Scoring by quarter: 19–11, 13–19, 19–18, 24–28

Roberto Clemente Coliseum, San Juan

== Championship playoffs ==
Semifinals
A1	Puerto Rico	74
B2	Dominican Republic	70
B1	Mexico	64
A2	Bahamas	48

Final
A1	Puerto Rico	60
B1	Mexico	65
3rd place match
B2	Dominican Republic	83
A2	Bahamas	85

=== Semifinals ===
27 July 2019
17:45

Boxscore

Mexico	64–48	Bahamas
Scoring by quarter: 16–18, 10–11, 22–12, 16–7

Roberto Clemente Coliseum, San Juan

27 July 2019
20:00

Boxscore

Puerto Rico	74–70	Dominican Republic
Scoring by quarter: 12–16, 24–12, 19–19, 19–23

Roberto Clemente Coliseum, San Juan

=== 3rd place match ===
28 July 2019
17:45

Boxscore

Dominican Republic	83–85	Bahamas
Scoring by quarter: 19–18, 21–23, 19–25, 24–19

Roberto Clemente Coliseum, San Juan

=== Final ===
28 July 2019
20:00

Boxscore

Puerto Rico	60–65	Mexico
Scoring by quarter: 14–15, 16–13, 18–17, 12–20

Roberto Clemente Coliseum, San Juan

== Final standings ==
Rank	Team
1st place, gold medalist(s)	Mexico
2nd place, silver medalist(s)	Puerto Rico
3rd place, bronze medalist(s)	Bahamas
4	Dominican Republic
5	Panama
6	Virgin Islands
7	Jamaica
8	El Salvador
