= 2018 FIBA Under-18 Americas Championship =

2018 FIBA U18 AmeriCup
11th FIBA Under-18 Americas Basketball Championship

Tournament details
- Host country: Canada
- Dates: 10–16 June
- Teams: 8
- Venue: 1 (in 1 host city)

Final positions
- Champions: United States (9th title)

Tournament statistics
- MVP: (United States) Quentin Grimes
- Top scorer: (Argentina) Giordano (18.5)
- Top rebounds: (Chile) Lorca-Lloyd (11.3)
- Top assists: (Canada) Nembhard (8.8)
- PPG (Team): United States (114.5)
- RPG (Team): Canada (53.5)
- APG (Team): United States (29.0)

Official website
- 2018 FIBA Under-18 Americas Championship

The 2018 FIBA Under-18 Americas Championship was an international under-18 basketball tournament that was held from 10 to 16 June 2018 in St. Catharines, Ontario, Canada. The eleventh edition of the biennial competition, this is also the qualifying tournament for FIBA Americas in the 2019 FIBA Under-19 Basketball World Cup in Greece.

== Hosts selection ==
On 12 April 2017, FIBA Americas, Canada Basketball and the Niagara Sports Commission announced that the city of St. Catharines will host the 2018 edition of the FIBA U18 Americas Championship. This will be the first time that Canada will host the continental under-18 tournament.

== Participating teams ==
- North America:
  - United States
  - Canada (Hosts)
- Central America/Caribbean: (2017 Central American/Caribbean U17 Championship in Santo Domingo, Dominican Republic - 26–30 July 2017)
  - Dominican Republic
  - Puerto Rico
  - Panama
- South America: (2017 South American U17 Championship in Lima, Peru - 15–21 July 2017)
  - Chile
  - Argentina
  - Ecuador

== Preliminary round ==
The draw was held on 20 March 2018 in FIBA Americas Regional Office in San Juan, Puerto Rico.

All times are local (UTC-4).

=== Group A ===
Pos	Team	Pld	W	L	PF	PA	PD	Pts	Qualification
1	United States	3	3	0	338	170	+168	6	Advance to Quarterfinals
2	Puerto Rico	3	2	1	263	260	+3	5	Advance to Quarterfinals
3	Dominican Republic	3	1	2	257	267	−10	4	Advance to Quarterfinals
4	Panama	3	0	3	131	292	−161	3	Advance to Quarterfinals

Source: FIBA Americas
Rules for classification: 1) Points; 2) Head-to-head results; 3) Points difference; 4) Points scored.

10 June 2018
18:00

Boxscore

Dominican Republic	73–105	United States
Scoring by quarter: 14–21, 20–22, 20–28, 19–34
Pts: Frink 16; Rebs: Soriano 9 Asts: Verplancken 5		Pts: Anthony 18; Rebs: Bacot, Hurt 9 Asts: Dosunmu 4

Meridian Centre, St. Catharines
Referees: Sebastián Negrón (CHI), Christian Wilmore (BAH), Nathaniel Saunders (CAN)

10 June 2018
20:15

Boxscore

Panama	51–84	Puerto Rico
Scoring by quarter: 17–20, 19–14, 7–27, 8–23
Pts: Zephyrine 13; Rebs: Lombardo 7 Asts: Andrade 8		Pts: Rosa 12; Rebs: Palermo, Vásquez 7 Asts: Palermo, Santiago 4

Meridian Centre, St. Catharines
Referees: Maripier Malo (CAN), Krishna Domínguez (MEX), Carlos Peralta (ECU)

11 June 2018
14:15

Boxscore

Puerto Rico	108–94	Dominican Republic
Scoring by quarter: 26–19, 27–21, 23–21, 32–33
Pts: Conditt, Rosa 18; Rebs: Conditt 13; Asts: Santiago 10		Pts: Quiñones 31; Rebs: Jones 8 Asts: Jones 5

Meridian Centre, St. Catharines
Referees: Nathaniel Saunders (CAN), Omar Bermúdez (MEX), Fabiano Huber (BRA)

11 June 2018
20:15

Boxscore

United States	118–26	Panama
Scoring by quarter: 43–0, 27–8, 29–9, 19–9
Pts: Bacot 17; Rebs: Robinson-Earl 13; Asts: White 7		Pts: Borbua 9 Rebs: Lombardo 8 Asts: Sanjur, Roux 2

Meridian Centre, St. Catharines
Referees: Maripier Malo (CAN), Sebastián Negrón (CHI), Carlos Peralta (ECU)

12 June 2018
14:15

Boxscore

Dominican Republic	90–54	Panama
Scoring by quarter: 23–10, 26–12, 22–17, 19–15
Pts: Bonilla 17; Rebs: Torres 11; Asts: Herasme 4		Pts: López 13; Rebs: López 8 Asts: Andrade 4

Meridian Centre, St. Catharines
Referees: Maripier Malo (CAN), Sebastián Negrón (CHI), Carlos Peralta (ECU)

12 June 2018
18:00

Boxscore

Puerto Rico	71–115	United States
Scoring by quarter: 18–31, 11–25, 24–22, 18–37
Pts: Santiago 17; Rebs: Grafals 6 Asts: Vásquez 4		Pts: Grimes 20; Rebs: Robinson-Earl 10; Asts: three players 5

Meridian Centre, St. Catharines
Referees: Omar Bermúdez (MEX), Fabiano Huber (BRA), Nathaniel Saunders (CAN)

=== Group B ===
Pos	Team	Pld	W	L	PF	PA	PD	Pts	Qualification
1	Canada (H)	3	3	0	304	210	+94	6	Advance to Quarterfinals
2	Argentina	3	2	1	233	219	+14	5	Advance to Quarterfinals
3	Chile	3	1	2	200	235	−35	4	Advance to Quarterfinals
4	Ecuador	3	0	3	198	271	−73	3	Advance to Quarterfinals

Source: FIBA Americas
Rules for classification: 1) Points; 2) Head-to-head results; 3) Points difference; 4) Points scored.
(H) Hosts

10 June 2018
12:00

Boxscore

Chile	74–62	Ecuador
Scoring by quarter: 18–23, 16–18, 20–9, 20–12
Pts: Lorca-Lloyd 20; Rebs: Lorca-Lloyd 15; Asts: Arroyo 8		Pts: Mi. Moncayo 27; Rebs: Capurro 9 Asts: Rivera 2

Meridian Centre, St. Catharines
Referees: Natalia Cuello Cuello (DOM), Julio Anaya (PAN), Grant Alexander Todey (USA)

10 June 2018
14:15

Boxscore

Argentina	75–92	Canada
Scoring by quarter: 24–26, 11–26, 25–19, 15–21
Pts: Marcos 23; Rebs: Ruesga, Cáffaro 7 Asts: Farabello 7		Pts: Nembhard 28; Rebs: Samuel 10; Asts: Nembhard 6

Meridian Centre, St. Catharines
Referees: Omar Bermúdez (MEX), Fabiano Huber (BRA), Alexis Mercado Pacheco (PUR)

11 June 2018
11:30

Boxscore

Canada	115–75	Ecuador
Scoring by quarter: 37–19, 24–18, 36–18, 18–20
Pts: Lawson, Patterson 20; Rebs: three players 8 Asts: Nembhard 9		Pts: Sánchez 26; Rebs: Rivera 6 Asts: Rivera, Sánchez 4

Meridian Centre, St. Catharines
Referees: Christian Wilmore (BAH), Alexis Mercado Pacheco (PUR), Grant Alexander Todey (USA)

11 June 2018
18:00

Boxscore

Argentina	76–66	Chile
Scoring by quarter: 18–11, 15–27, 20–16, 23–12
Pts: Giordano 24; Rebs: Cáffaro 15; Asts: Farabello 8		Pts: Lorca-Lloyd 17; Rebs: Lorca-Lloyd 11; Asts: Arroyo 8

Meridian Centre, St. Catharines
Referees: Krishna Domínguez (MEX), Natalia Cuello Cuello (DOM), Julio Anaya (PAN)

12 June 2018
12:00

Boxscore

Ecuador	61–82	Argentina
Scoring by quarter: 19–13, 15–23, 12–26, 15–20
Pts: Mi. Moncayo 16; Rebs: Capurro 12; Asts: Mi. Moncayo 5		Pts: De La Fuente 18; Rebs: Hierrezuelo 8 Asts: Farabello, Marcos 5

Meridian Centre, St. Catharines
Referees: Natalia Cuello (DOM), Alexis Mercado (PUR), Grant Alexander Todey (USA)

12 June 2018
20:15

Boxscore

Chile	60–97	Canada
Scoring by quarter: 20–28, 13–22, 11–24, 16–23
Pts: Lorca-Lloyd 11; Rebs: Lorca-Lloyd 8 Asts: Arroyo, Rubio 6		Pts: Nembhard 19; Rebs: J. Bediako 12; Asts: Nembhard 7

Meridian Centre, St. Catharines
Referees: Christian Wilmore (BAH), Julio Anaya (PAN), Krishna Domínguez (MEX)

== Knockout stage ==
=== Bracket ===
Fifth place
3A	Dominican Republic	63
3B	Chile	69
Seventh place
4B	Ecuador	51
4A	Panama	66

5–8th place semifinals
4B	Ecuador	70
3A	Dominican Republic	102
3B	Chile	67
4A	Panama	61

Quarterfinals
1A	United States	132
4B	Ecuador	55
3A	Dominican Republic	70
2B	Argentina	87
2A	Puerto Rico	68
3B	Chile	65
4A	Panama	39
1B	Canada	105

Semifinals
1A	United States	104
2B	Argentina	92
2A	Puerto Rico	89
1B	Canada	95

Final
1A	United States	113
1B	Canada	74
Third place
2B	Argentina	87
2A	Puerto Rico	79

=== Quarterfinals ===
14 June 2018
12:00

Boxscore

Dominican Republic	70–87	Argentina
Scoring by quarter: 14–31, 21–17, 18–20, 17–19
Pts: Frink 27; Rebs: Frink 7 Asts: three players 2		Pts: Giordano 35; Rebs: Cáffaro 8 Asts: Marcos 6

Meridian Centre, St. Catharines
Referees: Omar Bermúdez (MEX), Nathaniel Saunders (CAN), Sebastián Negrón (CHI)

14 June 2018
14:15

Boxscore

Puerto Rico	68–65	Chile
Scoring by quarter: 18–16, 12–24, 21–10, 17–15
Pts: Vásquez 23; Rebs: Torres 10; Asts: Santiago, Placer 5		Pts: Arroyo 18; Rebs: Lorca-Lloyd 11; Asts: Arroyo 8

Meridian Centre, St. Catharines
Referees: Krishna Domínguez (MEX), Fabiano Huber (BRA), Carlos Peralta (ECU)

14 June 2018
18:00

Boxscore

United States	132–55	Ecuador
Scoring by quarter: 35–13, 30–12, 36–18, 31–12
Pts: Jackson-Davis 20; Rebs: Jackson-Davis 11; Asts: Anthony, Robinson-Earl 6		Pts: Capurro, Valles 19; Rebs: three players 4 Asts: Ma. Moncayo 3

Meridian Centre, St. Catharines
Referees: Maripier Malo (CAN), Julio Anaya (PAN), Alexis Mercado (PUR)

14 June 2018
20:15

Boxscore

Panama	39–105	Canada
Scoring by quarter: 7–22, 9–34, 13–20, 10–29
Pts: Gunn 15; Rebs: Gunn 9 Asts: López 3		Pts: Patterson 26; Rebs: J. Bediako 12; Asts: Nembhard 6

Meridian Centre, St. Catharines
Referees: Christian Wilmore (BAH), Grant Alexander Todey (USA)

=== 5–8th place semifinals ===
15 June 2018
12:00

Boxscore

Ecuador	70–102	Dominican Republic
Scoring by quarter: 20–24, 18–20, 19–27, 13–31
Pts: Mi. Moncayo 25; Rebs: Rivera 15; Asts: Sánchez, Valles 5		Pts: Quiñones 20; Rebs: Quiñones 15; Asts: Quiñones 7

Meridian Centre, St. Catharines
Referees: Maripier Malo (CAN), Fabiano Huber (BRA), Grant Alexander Todey (USA)

15 June 2018
14:15

Boxscore

Chile	67–61	Panama
Scoring by quarter: 7–14, 19–8, 18–21, 23– 18
Pts: Carrasco, Rubio 15; Rebs: Lorca-Lloyd 15; Asts: Carrasco 8		Pts: López 19; Rebs: Gunn, Lombardo 7 Asts: Andrade 6

Meridian Centre, St. Catharines
Referees: Christian Wilmore (BAH), Nathaniel Saunders (CAN), Alexis Mercado (PUR)

=== Semifinals ===
15 June 2018
18:00

Boxscore

United States	104–92	Argentina
Scoring by quarter: 24–18, 30–21, 17–20, 33–33
Pts: Grimes 26; Rebs: Grimes, Hurt 8 Asts: three players 4		Pts: Cáffaro 22; Rebs: Cáffaro 6 Asts: Giordano 5

Meridian Centre, St. Catharines
Referees: Natalia Cuello (DOM), Krishna Domínguez (MEX), Carlos Peralta (ECU)

15 June 2018
20:15

Boxscore

Puerto Rico	89–95	Canada
Scoring by quarter: 22–23, 19–24, 23–21, 25–27
Pts: Torres 21; Rebs: Torres 12; Asts: Vásquez 7		Pts: Miller 31; Rebs: Miller 14; Asts: Nembhard 17

Meridian Centre, St. Catharines
Referees: Omar Bermúdez (MEX), Julio Anaya (PAN), Sebastián Negrón (CHI)

=== Seventh place game ===
16 June 2018
12:00

Boxscore

Ecuador	51–66	Panama
Scoring by quarter: 16–24, 10–17, 13–14, 12–11
Pts: Capurro 22; Rebs: Capurro 11; Asts: Sánchez 6		Pts: Gunn 18; Rebs: Gunn 18; Asts: Andrade 8

Meridian Centre, St. Catharines
Referees: Natalia Cuello (DOM), Fabiano Huber (BRA), Grant Alexander Todey (USA)

=== Fifth place game ===
16 June 2018
14:15

Boxscore

Dominican Republic	63–69	Chile
Scoring by quarter: 15–15, 14–20, 20–11, 14–23
Pts: Frink 18; Rebs: Frink 22; Asts: Quiñones, Rubel 3		Pts: Arroyo 24; Rebs: Inyaco 9 Asts: Arroyo 7

Meridian Centre, St. Catharines
Referees: Julio Anaya (PAN), Alexis Mercado (PUR), Carlos Peralta (ECU)

=== Third place game ===
16 June 2018
18:00

Boxscore

Argentina	87–79	Puerto Rico
Scoring by quarter: 16–23, 21–22, 24–21, 26–13
Pts: Cáffaro, Giordano 21; Rebs: Cáffaro 10; Asts: Giordano 9		Pts: Placer 22; Rebs: Torres 10; Asts: Torres 7

Meridian Centre, St. Catharines
Referees: Maripier Malo (CAN), Nathaniel Saunders (CAN), Sebastián Negrón (CHI)

=== Final ===
16 June 2018
20:15

Boxscore

United States	113–74	Canada
Scoring by quarter: 29–20, 32–13, 23–19, 29–22
Pts: Anthony 18; Rebs: Bacot, James 8 Asts: Dosunmu, Grimes 6		Pts: Lawson 18; Rebs: Lawson 12; Asts: Nembhard 8

Meridian Centre, St. Catharines
Referees: Omar Bermúdez (MEX), Krishna Domínguez (MEX), Christian Wilmore (BAH)

== Statistics and awards ==
=== Statistical leaders ===
Points

Name	PPG
(Argentina) Marco Giordano	18.5
(Dominican Republic) Alanzo Frink	18.2
(Dominican Republic) Lester Quiñones	17.5
(Canada) Emanuel Miller	17.3
(Argentina) Francisco Cáffaro	16.7

Rebounds

Name	RPG
(Chile) Maxwell Lorca-Lloyd	11.3
(Argentina) Francisco Cáffaro	8.8
(Dominican Republic) Alanzo Frink	8.7
(United States) Jeremiah Robinson-Earl	8.5
(Canada) Tyrese Samuel	8.0

Assists

Name	APG
(Canada) Andrew Nembhard	8.8
(Chile) Ignacio Arroyo	6.5
(Panama) Jonathan Andrade	5.4
(Puerto Rico) Giovanni Santiago	5.3
(Argentina) Francisco Farabello	5.3

Blocks

Name	BPG
(Puerto Rico) George Conditt	3.3
(Chile) Maxwell Lorca-Lloyd	2.8
(Ecuador) Aaron Capurro	1.5
(United States) Matthew Hurt	1.5
(United States) Trayce Jackson-Davis	1.2
(Ecuador) Kenning Rivera	1.2

Steals

Name	SPG
(Canada) Andrew Nembhard	2.7
(Panama) Jonathan Andrade	2.2
(Panama) JD Gunn	2.2
(Ecuador) Michael Moncayo	2.2
(Dominican Republic) Rafael Rubel	1.8

=== Awards ===
2018 FIBA Americas Under-18
Championship winners

United States
9th title

Most Valuable Player
(United States) Quentin Grimes

All Tournament Team

- (Canada) Andrew Nembhard
- (United States) Cole Anthony
- (United States) Coby White
- (United States) Quentin Grimes
- (Argentina) Francisco Cáffaro

== Final ranking ==
Qualified for the 2019 FIBA Under-19 Basketball World Cup

Rank	Team	Record
1st place, gold medalist(s)	United States	6–0
2nd place, silver medalist(s)	Canada	5–1
3rd place, bronze medalist(s)	Argentina	4–2
4	Puerto Rico	3–3
5	Chile	3–3
6	Dominican Republic	2–4
7	Panama	1–5
8	Ecuador	0–6
