= United States men's national under-19 basketball team =

United States
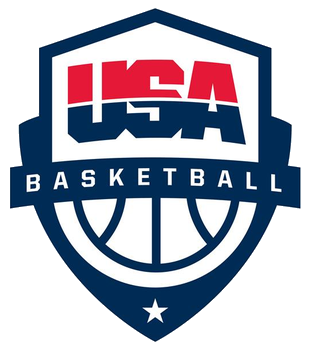
- FIBA ranking: 1
- FIBA zone: FIBA Americas
- National federation: USA Basketball
- Coach: Anthony Grant

FIBA Under-19 World Cup
- Appearances: 17
- Medals: Gold: 1979, 1983, 1991, 2009, 2013, 2015, 2019, 2021, 2025; Silver: 1987, 1999, 2007; Bronze: 2017

FIBA Under-18 AmeriCup
- Appearances: 14
- Medals: Gold: 1990, 1994, 1998, 2006, 2010, 2012, 2014, 2016, 2018, 2022, 2024; Silver: 2008, 2026; Bronze: 2002
Medal record
FIBA Under-19 World Cup
Gold medal – first place	1979 Brazil
Gold medal – first place	1983 Spain
Gold medal – first place	1991 Canada
Gold medal – first place	2009 New Zealand
Gold medal – first place	2013 Czech Republic
Gold medal – first place	2015 Greece
Gold medal – first place	2019 Greece
Gold medal – first place	2021 Latvia
Gold medal – first place	2025 Switzerland
Silver medal – second place	1987 Italy
Silver medal – second place	1999 Portugal
Silver medal – second place	2007 Serbia
Bronze medal – third place	2017 Egypt
FIBA Under-18 AmeriCup
Gold medal – first place	1990 Uruguay
Gold medal – first place	1994 Argentina
Gold medal – first place	1998 Dominican Republic
Gold medal – first place	2006 United States
Gold medal – first place	2010 United States
Gold medal – first place	2012 Brazil
Gold medal – first place	2014 United States
Gold medal – first place	2016 Chile
Gold medal – first place	2018 Canada
Gold medal – first place	2022 Mexico
Gold medal – first place	2024 Argentina
Silver medal – second place	2008 Argentina
Silver medal – second place	2026 León
Bronze medal – third place	2002 Venezuela

The United States men's national under-18 and under-19 basketball team is a national basketball team of the United States, administered by USA Basketball. It represents the country in international under-18 and under-19 basketball competitions.

== Competitive record ==
A red box around the year indicates tournaments played within the United States

=== FIBA Under-19 World Cup ===
Year	Result	Position	Pld	W	L	Ref
(Brazil) 1979	Champions	1st	8	8	0	
(Spain) 1983	Champions	1st	8	6	2	
(Italy) 1987	Runners-up	2nd	7	5	2	
(Canada) 1991	Champions	1st	8	8	0	
(Greece) 1995	Quarterfinals	7th	8	4	4	
(Portugal) 1999	Runners-up	2nd	8	7	1	
(Greece) 2003	Quarterfinals	5th	8	7	1	
(Serbia) 2007	Runners-up	2nd	9	8	1	
(New Zealand) 2009	Champions	1st	9	9	0	
(Latvia) 2011	Quarterfinals	5th	9	7	2	
(Czech Republic) 2013	Champions	1st	9	9	0	
(Greece) 2015	Champions	1st	7	7	0	
(Egypt) 2017	Third place	3rd	7	6	1	
(Greece) 2019	Champions	1st	7	7	0	
(Latvia) 2021	Champions	1st	7	7	0	
(Hungary) 2023	Semifinals	4th	7	5	2	
(Switzerland) 2025	Champions	1st	7	7	0	
(Czech Republic) 2027	Qualified					
(Indonesia) 2029	To be determined					
Total	9 titles	17/19	133	117	16	—

=== FIBA Under-18 AmeriCup ===
Year	Result	Position	Pld	W	L	Ref
(Uruguay) 1990	Champions	1st	7	7	0	
(Argentina) 1994	Champions	1st	8	8	0	
(Dominican Republic) 1998	Champions	1st	6	6	0	
(Venezuela) 2002	Third place	3rd	5	4	1	
(United States) 2006	Champions	1st	4	4	0	
(Argentina) 2008	Runners-up	2nd	5	4	1	
(United States) 2010	Champions	1st	5	5	0	
(Brazil) 2012	Champions	1st	5	5	0	
(United States) 2014	Champions	1st	5	5	0	
(Chile) 2016	Champions	1st	5	5	0	
(Canada) 2018	Champions	1st	6	6	0	
(Mexico) 2022	Champions	1st	6	6	0	
(Argentina) 2024	Champions	1st	6	6	0	
(Mexico) 2026	Runners-up	2nd	5	4	1	
Total	11 titles	14/14	78	75	3	—

== Current roster ==
United States men's national U-18 basketball team – 2026 FIBA Under-18 AmeriCup roster
Players
Coaches

Pos.	No.	Name	Age – Date of birth	Height	Club	Ctr.
PG	4	Taylen Kinney	18 – 19 January 2008	1.82 m (6 ft 0 in)	Kansas Jayhawks	(United States)
SF	5	Malachi Jordan	17 – 21 October 2008	1.98 m (6 ft 6 in)	Dream City Christian School	(United States)
SG	6	Davion Thompson	17 – 28 November 2008	1.87 m (6 ft 2 in)	Link Academy	(United States)
SF	7	Colben Landrew	18 – 27 February 2008	1.98 m (6 ft 6 in)	Connecticut Huskies	(United States)
SG	8	Bruce Branch III	17 – 24 December 2008	2.00 m (6 ft 7 in)	BYU Cougars	(United States)
PG	9	Jasiah Jervis	18 – 16 April 2008	1.93 m (6 ft 4 in)	Michigan State Spartans	(United States)
SG	10	Adan Diggs	17 – 2 October 2008	1.95 m (6 ft 5 in)	Millennium High School (Arizona)	(United States)
SF	11	Quentin Coleman	17 – 10 February 2009	1.93 m (6 ft 4 in)	Illinois Fighting Illini	(United States)
PG	12	Caleb Gaskins	17 – 13 August 2008	2.03 m (6 ft 8 in)	Miami Hurricanes	(United States)
PF	13	Darius Wabbington	17 – 29 August 2008	2.05 m (6 ft 9 in)	Sunnyslope High School	(United States)
PF	14	Demarcus Henry	17 – 30 October 2008	2.00 m (6 ft 7 in)	AZ Compass Prep	(United States)
C	15	Ethan Taylor	18 – 28 January 2008	2.13 m (7 ft 0 in)	Michigan State Spartans	(United States)

Head coach

- (United States) Anthony Grant

Assistant coach(es)

- (United States) Matt Langel
- (United States) Nate Oats

Legend

- (C) Team captain
- Club – describes last
  club before the tournament
- Age – describes age
  on 8 June 2025

Roster

== See also ==
- United States men's national basketball team
- United States men's national under-17 basketball team
- United States women's national basketball team
- United States women's national under-19 basketball team
- United States women's national under-17 basketball team
- United States men's national 3x3 team
- United States women's national 3x3 team
