= Dominican Republic men's national under-19 basketball team =

Dominican Republic
- FIBA zone: FIBA Americas
- National federation: Federación Dominicana de Baloncesto

U19 World Cup
- Appearances: 3

U18 AmeriCup
- Appearances: 9
- Medals: (bronze) Bronze: 1 (2014)

U17 Centrobasket
- Appearances: 9
- Medals: (gold) Gold: 2 (2013, 2017); (silver) Silver: 1 (2023); (bronze) Bronze: 3 (2007, 2015, 2021)
Home	Away

The Dominican Republic men's national under-17, under-18 and under-19 basketball team is a national basketball team of the Dominican Republic, administered by the Federación Dominicana de Baloncesto. It represents the country in international under-17, under-18 and under-19 basketball competitions.

== Tournament record ==
=== FIBA Under-19 Basketball World Cup ===
Year	Pos.	Pld	W	L
(Brazil) 1979	Did not qualify			
(Spain) 1983	9th	7	4	3
(Italy) 1987	Did not qualify			
(Canada) 1991	Did not qualify			
(Greece) 1995	Did not qualify			
(Portugal) 1999	Did not qualify			
(Greece) 2003	Did not qualify			
(Serbia) 2007	Did not qualify			
(Australia) 2009	Did not qualify			
(Latvia) 2011	Did not qualify			
(Czech Republic) 2013	Did not qualify			
(Greece) 2015	13th	7	3	4
(Egypt) 2017	Did not qualify			
(Greece) 2019	Did not qualify			
(Latvia) 2021	Did not qualify			
(Hungary) 2023	Did not qualify			
(Switzerland) 2025	15th	7	2	5
(Czech Republic) 2027	Did not qualify			
(Indonesia) 2029	To be determined			
Total	2/19	21	9	12

=== FIBA Under-18 AmeriCup ===
Year	Result
1994	6th
1998	5th
2002	5th
2014	3rd place, bronze medalist(s)
2016	8th
2018	6th
2022	7th
2024	4th
2026	7th

=== FIBA U17 Centrobasket ===
Year	Result
2007	3rd place, bronze medalist(s)
2009	4th
2011	5th
2013	1st place, gold medalist(s)
2015	3rd place, bronze medalist(s)
2017	1st place, gold medalist(s)
2019	4th
2021	3rd place, bronze medalist(s)
2023	2nd place, silver medalist(s)

== See also ==
- Dominican Republic men's national basketball team
- Dominican Republic men's national under-17 basketball team
- Dominican Republic women's national under-17 and under-18 basketball team
