= Virgin Islands men's national under-17 and under-18 basketball team =

U.S. Virgin Islands
- FIBA zone: FIBA Americas
- National federation: Virgin Islands Basketball Federation

U19 World Cup
- Appearances: None

U18 AmeriCup
- Appearances: 3
- Medals: None

U17 Centrobasket
- Appearances: 7
- Medals: (silver) Silver: 1 (2015); (bronze) Bronze: 2 (2009, 2011)

The United States Virgin Islands men's national under-17 and under-18 basketball team is a national basketball team of the United States Virgin Islands, administered by the Virgin Islands Basketball Federation. It represents the country in international under-17 and under-18 basketball competitions.

== FIBA U17 Centrobasket participations ==
Year	Result
2007	5th
2009	3rd place, bronze medalist(s)
2011	3rd place, bronze medalist(s)
2013	4th
2015	2nd place, silver medalist(s)
2017	5th
2019	6th

== FIBA Under-18 AmeriCup participations ==
Year	Result
2010	7th
2012	7th
2016	7th

== See also ==
- Virgin Islands men's national basketball team
- Virgin Islands women's national under-17 basketball team
