= Panama men's national under-19 basketball team =

Panama
- FIBA zone: FIBA Americas
- National federation: Basketball Federation of Panama

U19 World Cup
- Appearances: 1 (1979)
- Medals: None

U18 AmeriCup
- Appearances: 3
- Medals: None

U17 Centrobasket
- Appearances: 5
- Medals: (bronze) Bronze: 1 (2017)

The Panama men's national under-17, under-18 and under-19 basketball team is a national basketball team of Panama, administered by the Basketball Federation of Panama. It represents the country in men's international under-17, under-18 and under-19 basketball competitions.

== FIBA U17 Centrobasket participations ==
Year	Result
2011	8th
2017	3rd place, bronze medalist(s)
2019	5th
2021	5th
2023	5th

== FIBA Under-18 AmeriCup participations ==
Year	Result
1990	7th
1994	8th
2018	7th

== FIBA Under-19 Basketball World Cup participations ==
Year	Result
1979	7th

== See also ==
- Panama men's national basketball team
- Panama men's national under-15 basketball team
