= Stanley Johnson (basketball) =

American basketball player (born 1996)

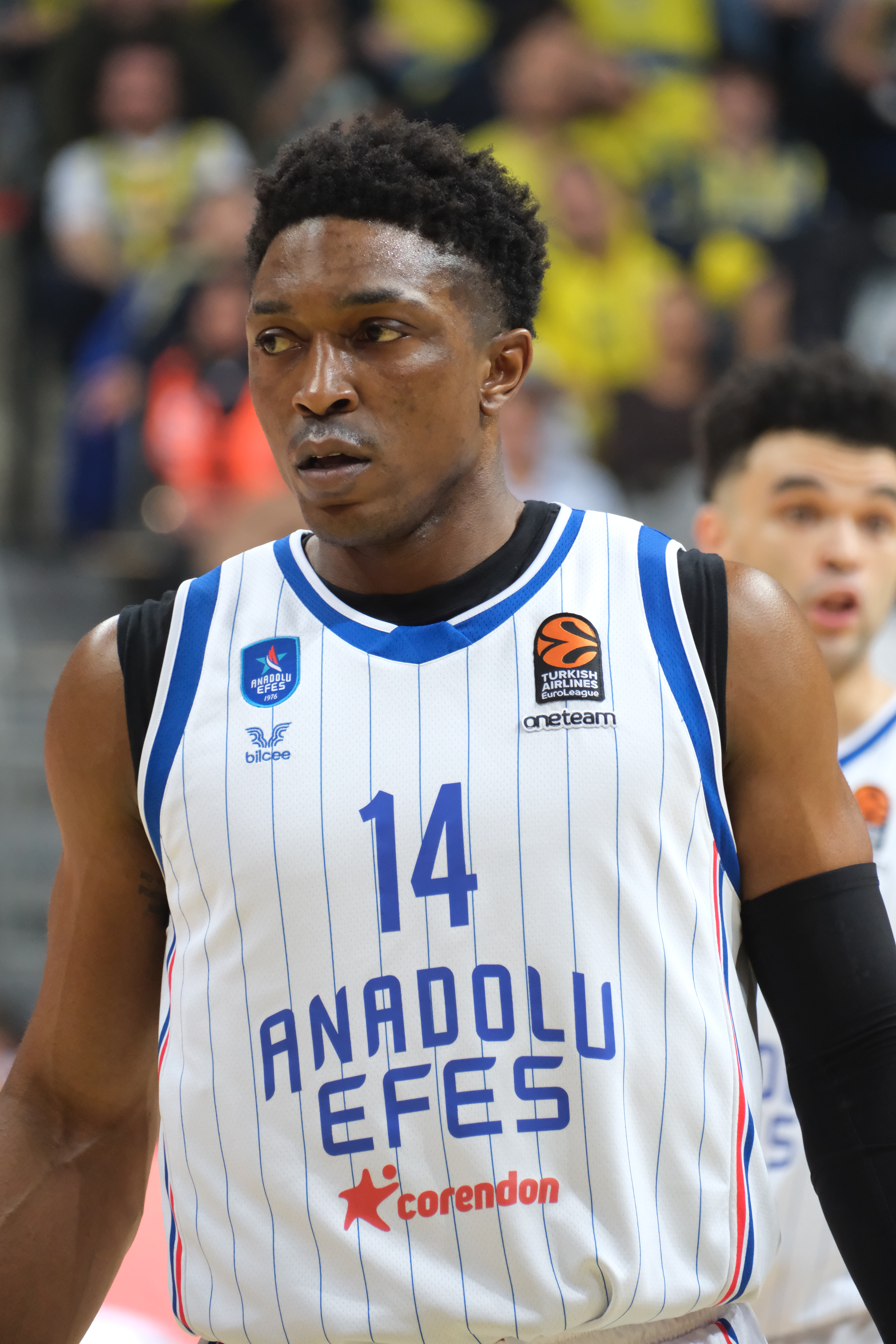
- Johnson with Anadolu Efes in 2025

No. 14 – Nagasaki Velca
- Position: Small forward / power forward
- League: B.League

Personal information
- Born: May 29, 1996 (age 30) Anaheim, California, U.S.
- Listed height: 6 ft 6 in (1.98 m)
- Listed weight: 242 lb (110 kg)

Career information
- High school: Mater Dei (Santa Ana, California)
- College: Arizona (2014–2015)
- NBA draft: 2015: 1st round, 8th overall pick
- Drafted by: Detroit Pistons
- Playing career: 2015–present

Career history
- 2015–2019: Detroit Pistons
- 2016: →Grand Rapids Drive
- 2019: New Orleans Pelicans
- 2019–2021: Toronto Raptors
- 2020: →Raptors 905
- 2021: South Bay Lakers
- 2021–2022: Los Angeles Lakers
- 2022: Sioux Falls Skyforce
- 2022–2023: San Antonio Spurs
- 2023–2024: Stockton Kings
- 2024–2025: Anadolu Efes
- 2025: South Bay Lakers
- 2025–present: Nagasaki Velca

Career highlights
- B.League champion (2026); Turkish Super Cup winner (2024); Julius Erving Award (2015); Third-team All-American – NABC (2015); First-team All-Pac-12 (2015); Pac-12 Freshman of the Year (2015); Pac-12 All-Freshman team (2015); First team Parade All-American (2014); MaxPreps National Basketball Player of the Year (2014); McDonald's All-American (2014); California Mr. Basketball (2014); FIBA Under-18 Americas Championship MVP (2014)
- Stats at NBA.com
- Stats at Basketball Reference
Medals
Men's basketball
Representing the United States
FIBA Under-18 Americas Championship
Gold medal – first place	2014 United States	Team
FIBA Under-17 World Cup
Gold medal – first place	2012 Lithuania	Team
FIBA Under-16 Americas Championship
Gold medal – first place	2011 Mexico	Team

Stanley Herbert Johnson Jr. (born May 29, 1996) is an American professional basketball player for Nagasaki Velca of the Japanese B.League. He played one season of college basketball for the Arizona Wildcats before being selected eighth overall by the Detroit Pistons in the 2015 NBA draft. He has also had stints in the NBA with the New Orleans Pelicans, Toronto Raptors, Los Angeles Lakers, and San Antonio Spurs.

== High school career ==
A native of Fullerton, California, Johnson was one of the top high school recruits of 2014 by Rivals.com, Scout.com and ESPN. He was a four-time CIF State champion at Mater Dei High School. He played in the 2014 McDonald's All-American Boys Game, 2014 Jordan Brand Classic and the 2014 Nike Hoop Summit. He was also a 2014 USA Today first team All-USA Boys Basketball Team selection. He scored 2,285 career points at Mater Dei, the third-highest mark in school history behind Taylor King (3,216) and Tom Lewis (2,456).

College recruiting
Name	Hometown	School	Height	Weight	Commit date
Stanley Johnson; PF	Santa Ana, CA	Mater Dei High School	6 ft 7 in (2.01 m)	242 lb (110 kg)	Nov 15, 2013
Stanley Johnson; PF	Recruit ratings: Scout: Rivals: 247Sports: ESPN:				
Overall recruit ranking: Scout: #3 Rivals: #4 ESPN: #6
Note: In many cases, Scout, Rivals, 247Sports, On3, and ESPN may conflict in their listings of height and weight.; In these cases, the average was taken. ESPN grades are on a 100-point scale.; Sources: "Arizona 2014 Basketball Commitments". Rivals.; "2014 Arizona Basketball Commits". Scout.; "2014 Arizona Wildcats Basketball Commitments". ESPN.; "Scout.com Team Recruiting Rankings". Scout.; "2014 Team Ranking". Rivals.

== College career ==
As a freshman at Arizona in 2014–15, Johnson was voted first-team All-Pac-12, and was named Pac-12 Freshman of the Year. He started 37 of the 38 games he played for the Wildcats, averaging 13.8 points, 6.5 rebounds, 1.7 assists and 1.5 steals in 28.4 minutes per game.

On April 23, 2015, Johnson declared for the NBA draft, forgoing his remaining three years of college eligibility. Johnson entered the draft as the 11th ranked prospect on ESPN's Top 100 draft board.

== Professional career ==
=== Detroit Pistons (2015–2019) ===
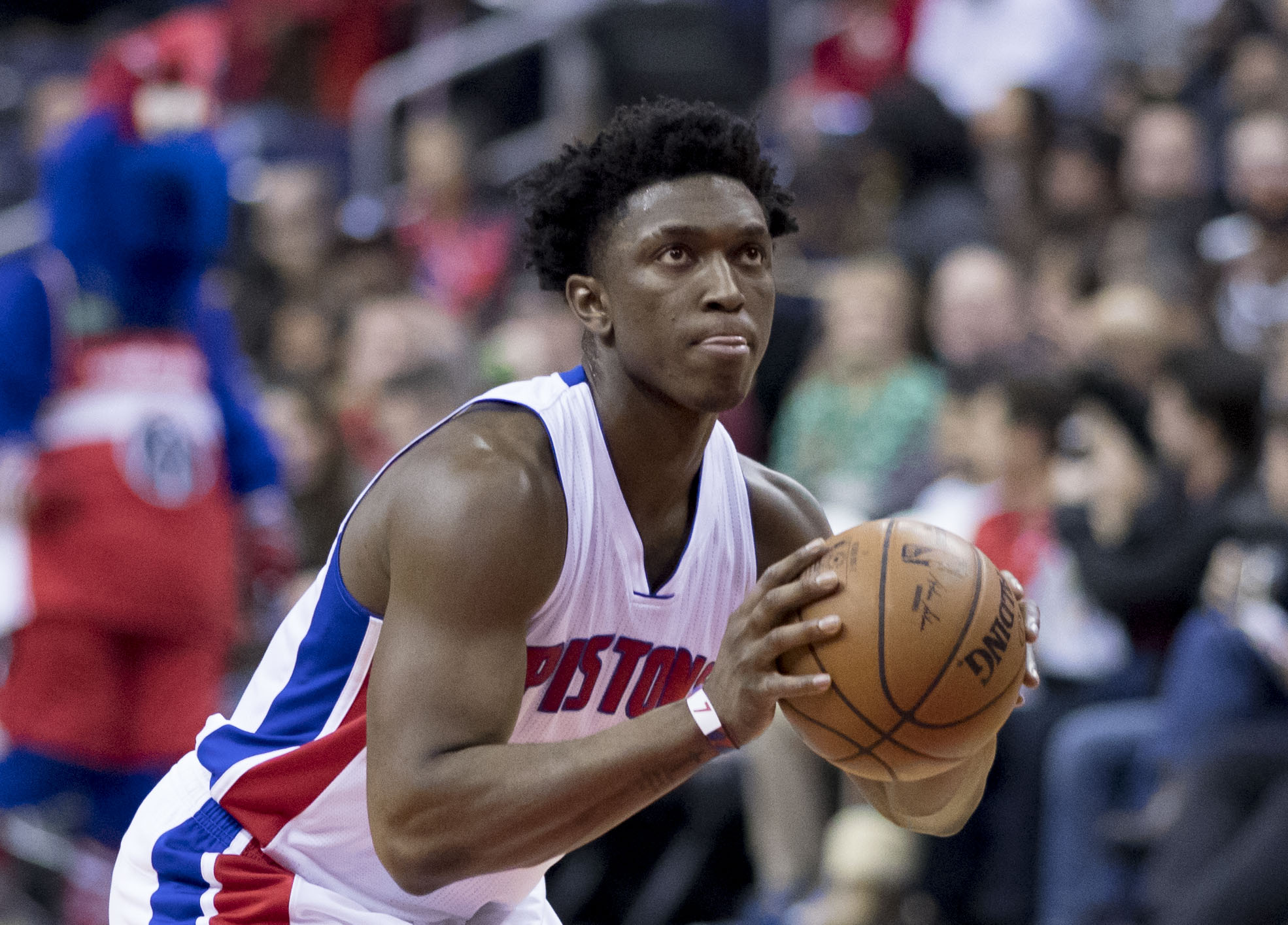
Johnson with the Pistons in 2016

On June 25, 2015, Johnson was selected with the eighth overall pick in the 2015 NBA draft by the Pistons. In his debut for the Pistons on October 27, he recorded seven points, four rebounds and three assists off the bench in a 106–94 win over the Atlanta Hawks. On November 9, he recorded 20 points and seven rebounds in a 109–95 loss to the Golden State Warriors. On February 4, while starting at shooting guard in place of the injured Kentavious Caldwell-Pope, Johnson scored a season-high 22 points in a 111–105 win over the New York Knicks.

On November 25, 2016, Johnson was suspended for one game without pay by the Pistons for violating team rules. On December 10, he was assigned to the Grand Rapids Drive of the NBA Development League and was recalled the next day. On March 8, 2017, he scored a season-high 17 points in a 115–98 loss to the Indiana Pacers. On January 30, 2018, Johnson scored a then career-high 26 points in a 125–114 win over the Cleveland Cavaliers.

On November 9, 2018, Johnson scored a season-high 22 points in a 124–109 win over the Atlanta Hawks.

=== New Orleans Pelicans (2019) ===
On February 7, 2019, Johnson was acquired by the New Orleans Pelicans in a three-team trade involving the Pistons and Milwaukee Bucks. On June 26, the Pelicans declined to extend a $4.5 million qualifying offer to Johnson, making him an unrestricted free agent.

=== Toronto Raptors (2019–2021) ===
On July 11, 2019, Johnson signed with the Toronto Raptors.

On August 12, 2020, Johnson hit his first ever game winning shot with 4.9 seconds remaining in the 4th quarter against the Philadelphia 76ers in the 2019–20 NBA season in Orlando. On August 14, 2020, Johnson put up a season high 23 points against the Denver Nuggets coming off the bench in a 117–109 victory. The Raptors made it to the post-season and managed to get to the second round of the 2020 NBA Playoffs, the first time in Johnson's career that he advanced to the second round. They pushed the Boston Celtics to 7 games before ultimately falling.

On May 13, 2021, Johnson scored a career high 35 points in a 102–114 loss to the Chicago Bulls.

=== South Bay Lakers (2021) ===
On September 8, 2021, Johnson signed with the Chicago Bulls, but was waived on October 16, after appearing in four preseason games. On November 15, he signed with the South Bay Lakers where he played six games and averaged 15.3 points, 6.7 rebounds, 2.2 assists and 2.17 steals per game.

=== Los Angeles Lakers (2021–2022) ===
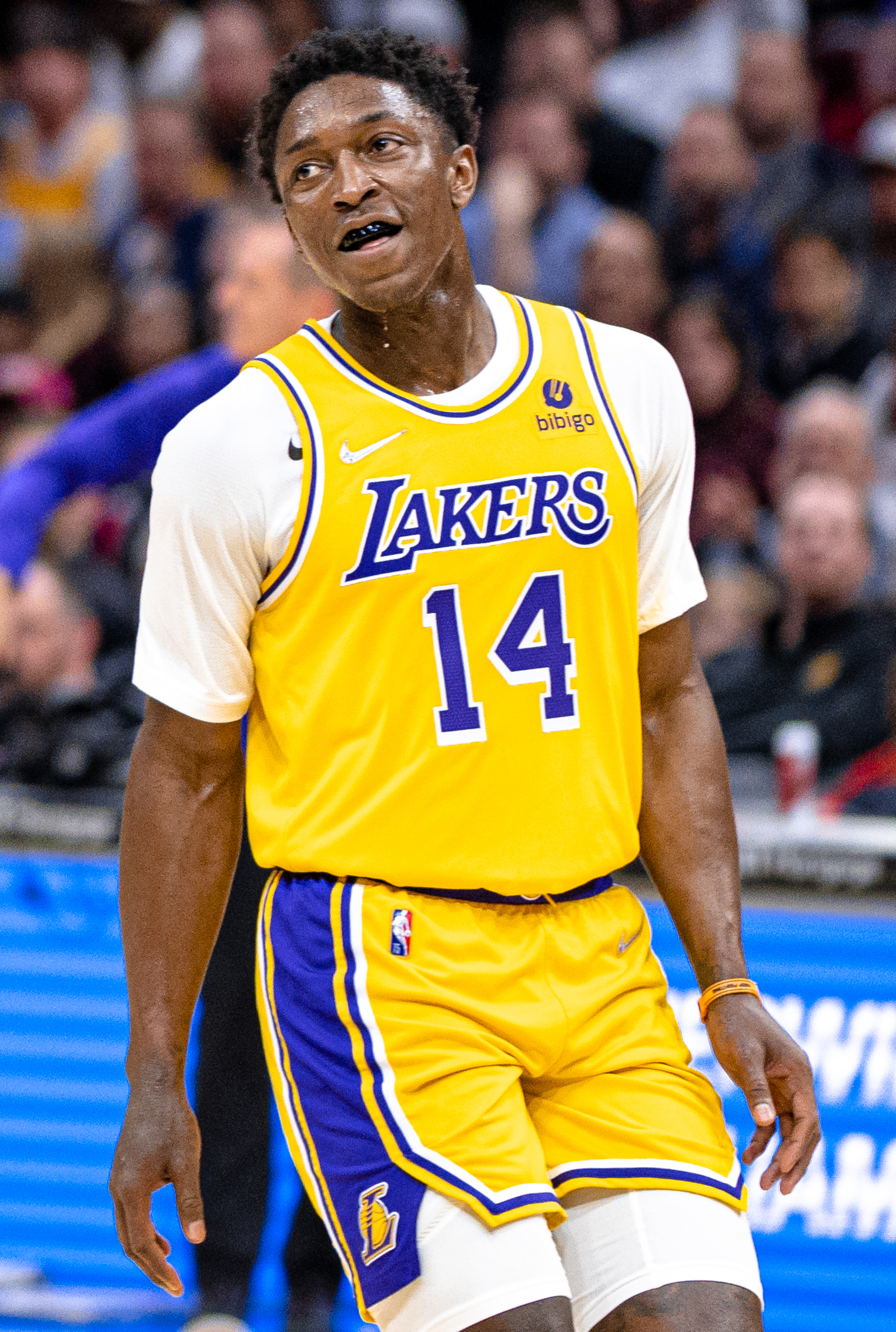
Johnson with the Los Angeles Lakers in 2022

On December 9, 2021, Johnson signed a 10-day contract with the Chicago Bulls. On December 11, Johnson, along with Ayo Dosunmu, was placed in the NBA's health and safety protocols. He never played a single game for the Bulls before his contract expired.

On December 24, 2021, Johnson signed a 10-day contract with his hometown team, the Los Angeles Lakers, via the hardship exemption. On January 6, 2022, he was signed to a second 10-day contract, and on January 17, he was signed to a third 10-day contract. Johnson signed a two-year contract with the Lakers on January 26.

On August 25, 2022, Johnson was traded, alongside Talen Horton-Tucker, to the Utah Jazz in exchange for Patrick Beverley. On October 15, 2022, Johnson was waived.

=== Sioux Falls Skyforce (2022) ===
On December 8, 2022, Johnson signed with the Sioux Falls Skyforce.

=== San Antonio Spurs (2022–2023) ===
On December 12, 2022, Johnson signed with the San Antonio Spurs. On February 12, 2023, he was waived by the Spurs.

On February 14, 2023, Johnson was reacquired by the Sioux Falls Skyforce.

=== Stockton Kings (2023–2024) ===
On December 6, 2023, Johnson was acquired by the Stockton Kings.

=== Anadolu Efes (2024–2025) ===
On July 4, 2024, Johnson signed with Anadolu Efes of the Turkish Basketbol Süper Ligi and the EuroLeague. In February 2025, Johnson was granted permission to temporarily leave the team and return to the United States for family reasons. On February 11, 2025, Johnson officially parted ways with the Turkish powerhouse and returned to the NBA G League. In 17 EuroLeague games, he averaged only 1.9 points and 1.1 rebounds per contest.

=== Nagasaki Velca (2025–2026) ===
On July 29, 2025, Johnson signed with Nagasaki Velca of the Japanese B.League.

=== Gunma Crane Thunders (2026–present) ===
On July 17, 2026, Johnson signed with the Gunma Crane Thunders of the Japanese B.League for the 2026–27 season.

== Career statistics ==
Legend
GP	Games played	GS	Games started	MPG	Minutes per game
FG%	Field goal percentage	3P%	3-point field goal percentage	FT%	Free throw percentage
RPG	Rebounds per game	APG	Assists per game	SPG	Steals per game
BPG	Blocks per game	PPG	Points per game	**Bold**	Career high

=== NBA ===
==== Regular season ====
Year	Team	GP	GS	MPG	FG%	3P%	FT%	RPG	APG	SPG	BPG	PPG
2015–16	Detroit	73	6	23.1	.375	.307	.784	**4.2**	1.6	.8	.2	8.1
2016–17	Detroit	**77**	1	17.8	.353	.292	.679	2.5	1.4	.7	**.3**	4.4
2017–18	Detroit	69	**50**	**27.4**	.375	.286	.772	3.7	1.6	**1.4**	.2	**8.7**
2018–19	Detroit	48	7	20.0	.381	.282	**.804**	3.6	1.3	1.0	**.3**	7.5
2018–19	New Orleans	18	0	13.7	.418	.324	.692	2.3	1.6	.7	.1	5.3
2019–20	Toronto	25	0	6.0	.373	.292	.563	1.5	.8	.2	.2	2.4
2020–21	Toronto	61	13	16.5	.382	.328	.800	2.5	1.5	.9	**.3**	4.4
2021–22	L.A. Lakers	48	27	22.8	.466	.314	.716	3.2	1.7	.9	**.3**	6.7
2022–23	San Antonio	30	0	15.6	**.533**	**.450**	.667	3.2	**2.2**	.5	.2	5.8
Career		449	104	19.8	.391	.305	.748	3.1	1.5	.9	.2	6.2

==== Playoffs ====
Year	Team	GP	GS	MPG	FG%	3P%	FT%	RPG	APG	SPG	BPG	PPG
2016	Detroit	**4**	0	**20.3**	**.522**	**.600**	**1.000**	**4.0**	.0	**.3**	.0	**8.0**
2020	Toronto	3	0	6.7	.445	.400	**1.000**	1.3	**2.0**	.0	.0	4.3
Career		7	0	14.4	.500	.533	1.000	2.9	.9	.1	.0	6.4

=== EuroLeague ===
Year	Team	GP	GS	MPG	FG%	3P%	FT%	RPG	APG	SPG	BPG	PPG	PIR
2024–25	Anadolu Efes	17	5	7.5	.314	.133	.692	1.1	.3	.4	.1	1.9	1.2
Career		17	5	7.5	.314	.133	.692	1.1	.3	.4	.1	1.9	1.2

=== College ===
Year	Team	GP	GS	MPG	FG%	3P%	FT%	RPG	APG	SPG	BPG	PPG
2014–15	Arizona	38	38	28.4	.446	.371	.742	6.5	1.7	1.5	.4	13.8

== Awards and honors ==
High school

- First-team HS All-American USA Today (2014)
- 2× CIF Division I state champion (2011–2012)
- 2× CIF Open Division state champion (2013–2014)
- MaxPreps.com High School National Player of the Year (2014)
- California Mr. Basketball (2014)
- All-California Interscholastic Federation (CIF) Division I first team (2012)
- ESPNHS Cal-Hi Sports California Sophomore of the Year (2012)
- MaxPreps.com Freshman All-America honorable mention (2011)
- CIF All-state first team (2011, 2012)
- CIF All-league first team (2012)

College

- Julius Erving Award (2015)
- All-Freshman All-American Team USBWA (2015)
- Pac-12 Tournament All-Tournament Team (2015)
- District IX All-District Team USBWA (2015)
- Third-team USA Today All-American (2015)
- First-team All-Pac-12 (2015)
- Pac-12 Freshman Player of the Year (2015)
- All-Pac-12 Freshman team (2015)
- 2014 Maui Invitational MVP, All-Tournament Team
- 2× Pac-12 Player of the Week (December 1, 2014; January 19, 2015)
- NCAA Player of the Week (January 19, 2015)
- Wayman Tisdale National Freshmen of the Week (January 18, 2015)
- Wayman Tisdale National Freshmen of the Year Award Finalist

== National team career ==
Johnson earned gold medals in the 2011 FIBA Americas Under-16 Championship, 2012 FIBA Under-17 World Championship and 2014 FIBA Americas Under-18 Championship. Johnson served as captain of the 2014 team and earned MVP of the 2014 tournament.

== Personal life ==
Johnson was born in Anaheim, California to Karen Taylor and Stanley Johnson Sr. His parents divorced and his father remarried. Johnson was the couple's only child, and he was raised by his mother in Fullerton. His mother played college basketball for Jackson State, where she was inducted into their Sports Hall of Fame in 2009; she also played professionally in Europe. Johnson is the stepson of Easter Johnson, and has two brothers and two sisters. Johnson is a Christian.
