= 2014 FIBA Americas Under-18 Championship =

2014 FIBA U18 AmeriCup
9th FIBA Under-18 Americas Basketball Championship

Tournament details
- Host country: United States
- Dates: 20–24 June 2014
- Teams: 8 (from 8 federations)

Final positions
- Champions: United States (7th title)

Tournament statistics
- MVP: (United States) Stanley Johnson
- Top scorer: (Canada) Brooks (25.2)
- Top rebounds: (Mexico) Yamada (11.8)
- Top assists: (United States) Jones (6.4)
- PPG (Team): United States (115.4)
- RPG (Team): United States (53.4)
- APG (Team): United States (22.8)

Official website
- 2014 FIBA Americas Under-18 Championship

== Standings ==
=== Group A ===
Pos	Team	Pld	W	L	PF	PA	PD	Pts	Qualification
1	Canada	3	3	0	271	196	+75	6	Advance to Semifinals
2	Dominican Republic	3	2	1	213	220	−7	5	Advance to Semifinals
3	Puerto Rico	3	1	2	222	240	−18	4	Classification 5-8
4	Brazil	3	0	3	203	253	−50	3	Classification 5-8

Source: Standings

20 June 2014
19:00 (UTC)

Boxscore

Canada	101–59	Brazil
Scoring by quarter: 30–20, 21–12, 27–8, 23–19
Pts: Brooks 29; Rebs: Miller 7 Asts: Miller 6		Pts: Siewert 17; Rebs: da Silva 7 Asts: de Paula 5

US Olympic Training Center, Colorado Springs
Referees: Manuel Mazzoni (ITA), Omar Bermudez (MEX), Mauricio Sosa (ESA)

20 June 2014
21:15 (UTC)

Boxscore

Puerto Rico	72–74	Dominican Republic
Scoring by quarter: 16–18, 20–17, 14–21, 22–18
Pts: Gandía 19; Rebs: Ezegwula 10; Asts: Morales, Jr. 5		Pts: Matos 15; Rebs: Perez 12; Asts: Flores 3

US Olympic Training Center, Colorado Springs
Referees: Lauren Bass (USA), Alejandro Sanchez (URU), Robert Smith (USA)

21 June 2014
17:00 (UTC)

Boxscore

Puerto Rico	80–75	Brazil
Scoring by quarter: 24–22, 12–16, 17–24, 22–18
Pts: Gandía 17; Rebs: Toro 7 Asts: two players 5		Pts: da Silva 16; Rebs: da Silva 7 Asts: de Paula 4

US Olympic Training Center, Colorado Springs
Referees: Lauren Bass, Thomas Short, Omar Bermudez

21 June 2014
19:00 (UTC)

Boxscore

Dominican Republic	67–79	Canada
Scoring by quarter: 16–19, 11–17, 16–15, 24–28
Pts: Flores 14; Rebs: Araújo 10; Asts: two players 3		Pts: Gill-Caesar 23; Rebs: three players 5 Asts: Miller 4

US Olympic Training Center, Colorado Springs
Referees: Amit Balak, Alejandro Sanchez, Roberto Smith

22 June 2014
17:00 (UTC)

Boxscore

Puerto Rico	70–91	Canada
Scoring by quarter: 15-28, 15-22, 10-19, 30-22
Pts: Jusino 13; Rebs: Rivera 6 Asts: Morales, Gandia 3		Pts: Brooks 26; Rebs: Egi 14; Asts: Tutu 6

US Olympic Training Center, Colorado Springs

22 June 2014
21:15 (UTC)

Boxscore

Brazil	69–72	Dominican Republic
Scoring by quarter: 22-19, 11-16, 18-16, 18-21
Pts: de Paula 25; Rebs: de Paula 8 Asts: de Paula 6		Pts: Rodriguez 16; Rebs: Rodriguez 11; Asts: Matos, Feliz 3

US Olympic Training Center, Colorado Springs

=== Group B ===
Pos	Team	Pld	W	L	PF	PA	PD	Pts	Qualification
1	United States	3	3	0	374	168	+206	6	Advance to Semifinals
2	Argentina	3	2	1	218	245	−27	5	Advance to Semifinals
3	Uruguay	3	1	2	202	293	−91	4	Classification 5-8
4	Mexico	3	0	3	188	276	−88	3	Classification 5-8

Source: Standings

20 June 2014
17:00 (UTC)

Boxscore

Mexico	72–87	Argentina
Scoring by quarter: 18–18, 25–27, 20–26, 9–16
Pts: Garcia 14; Rebs: Venegas 19; Asts: Garcia 4		Pts: Arengo 24; Rebs: Lugrin 12; Asts: four players 2

US Olympic Training Center, Colorado Springs
Referees: Natalia Cuello (DOM), Matthew Kallio (CAN), Alexis Mercado (PUR)

20 June 2014
23:30 (UTC)

Boxscore

Uruguay	58–156	United States
Scoring by quarter: 15–44, 11–40, 19–38, 13–34
Pts: Counago 13; Rebs: Borrallo 8 Asts: Ulery 3		Pts: Kennard 30; Rebs: Lydon 9 Asts: Brunson 13

US Olympic Training Center, Colorado Springs
Referees: Amit Balak (ISR), Diego Chiconato (BRA), Ricardo Hayles (JAM)

21 June 2014
21:15 (UTC)

Boxscore

Uruguay	55–67	Argentina
Scoring by quarter: 12–22, 13–19, 16–10, 14–16
Pts: Galletto Lamela 14; Rebs: De Leon 12; Asts: De Leon 2		Pts: Vildoza 16; Rebs: Vildoza 12; Asts: Vildoza 5

US Olympic Training Center, Colorado Springs
Referees: Manuel Mazzoni, Matthew Kallio, Ricardo Hayles

21 June 2014
23:30 (UTC)

Boxscore

United States	100–46	Mexico
Scoring by quarter: 26–9, 30–4, 21–23, 23–10
Pts: Johnson 18; Rebs: Briscoe 10; Asts: Jones 5		Pts: Diez 19; Rebs: Yamada 9 Asts: Arias 2

US Olympic Training Center, Colorado Springs
Referees: Natalia Cuello, Diego Chiconato, Alexis Pacheco

22 June 2014
19:00 (UTC)

Boxscore

Mexico	70–89	Uruguay
Scoring by quarter: 6–26, 26–21, 11–19, 27–23
Pts: Mendoza 17; Rebs: Venegas 7 Asts: Molina 3		Pts: Grolla De Leon 18; Rebs: Grolla De Leon 11; Asts: 4 players 3

US Olympic Training Center, Colorado Springs

22 June 2014
23:30 (UTC)

Boxscore

Argentina	64–118	United States
Scoring by quarter: 11–34, 15–29, 15–28, 23–27
Pts: Delfino 19; Rebs: Delfino 8 Asts: Sansiomi 4		Pts: Brunson 16; Rebs: Kennard 9 Asts: Jones 9

US Olympic Training Center, Colorado Springs

== Final round ==
Semifinals
23 June
Canada	91*
Argentina	82
23 June
United States	90
Dominican Republic	56

Final
24 June
Canada	79
United States	113

* denotes overtime period

=== Classification 5–8 ===
23 June 2014
17:00 (UTC)

Boxscore

Puerto Rico	70–69	Mexico
Scoring by quarter: 23–23, 17–15, 17–19, 13–12
Pts: Rivera 13; Rebs: Toro Barea 11; Asts: Gandia Rosa 4		Pts: Arenas Piquero 20; Rebs: Venegas Yamada 11; Asts: Garcia Arias 6

US Olympic Training Center, Colorado Springs

23 June 2014
19:00 (UTC)

Boxscore

Uruguay	55–97	Brazil
Scoring by quarter: 13–16, 14–28, 14–33, 14–20
Pts: Medina Reyes 14; Rebs: Rojas Basilico 6 Asts: Grolla De Leon 24		Pts: Alves Da Silva 24; Rebs: Henrique Da Silva 10; Asts: Cunha Da Silva 6

US Olympic Training Center, Colorado Springs

=== Semifinals ===
23 June 2014
21:15 (UTC)

Boxscore

Canada	91–82 (OT)	Argentina
Scoring by quarter: 23-16, 19-21, 22-16, 12-23, Overtime: 15-6
Pts: Brooks 29; Rebs: Egi 9 Asts: Tutu 3		Pts: Vildoza 26; Rebs: Arengo, Vildoza 6 Asts: Martinelli 2

US Olympic Training Center, Colorado Springs

23 June 2014
23:30 (UTC)

Boxscore

United States	90–56	Dominican Republic
Scoring by quarter: 24-14, 27-15, 18-12, 21-15
Pts: Johnson 15; Rebs: Johnson 7 Asts: Jones 7		Pts: Perez 11; Rebs: Rodriguez 10; Asts: 3 tied 2

US Olympic Training Center, Colorado Springs

== Final classification games ==
=== Seventh place game ===
24 June 2014
17:00 (UTC)

Boxscore

Mexico	79–65	Uruguay
Scoring by quarter: 26-22, 14-14, 13-27, 26-2
Pts: Alvarez 16; Rebs: Venegas 13; Asts: Garcia, Alvarez 5		Pts: Couñago 24; Rebs: Medina 8 Asts: Medina 4

US Olympic Training Center, Colorado Springs

=== Fifth place game ===
24 June 2014
19:00 (UTC)

Boxscore

Puerto Rico	88–84 (OT)	Brazil
Scoring by quarter: 27–16, 18–30, 15–13, 14–15, Overtime: 14–10
Pts: Toro Barea 19; Rebs: Toro Barea 12; Asts: Morales 2		Pts: Vezaro 17; Rebs: Alves Da Silva 11; Asts: de Paula 6

US Olympic Training Center, Colorado Springs

=== Bronze medal game ===
24 June 2014
21:15 (UTC)

Boxscore

Argentina	53–64	Dominican Republic
Scoring by quarter: 10–16, 12–15, 18–15, 13–18
Pts: Delfino 14; Rebs: Vildoza 7 Asts: Vildoza 7		Pts: Araújo Made 16; Rebs: Araújo Made 15; Asts: Flores Rosario 6

US Olympic Training Center, Colorado Springs

=== Final ===
24 June 2014
23:30 (UTC)

Boxscore

Canada	79–113	United States
Scoring by quarter: 15–21, 20–28, 18–36, 26–28
Pts: Brooks 27; Rebs: Egi 13; Asts: Tutu 2		Pts: Winslow 20; Rebs: Winslow 10; Asts: Brunson 6

US Olympic Training Center, Colorado Springs

== Awards ==
Most Valuable Player
(United States) Stanley Johnson

== Final ranking ==
Qualified for the 2015 FIBA Under-19 World Championship.

Rank	Team	Record
1st place, gold medalist(s)	United States	5–0
2nd place, silver medalist(s)	Canada	4–1
3rd place, bronze medalist(s)	Dominican Republic	3–2
4	Argentina	2–3
5	Puerto Rico	3–2
6	Brazil	1–4
7	Mexico	1–4
8	Uruguay	1–4
