= 2023 FIBA U17 Centrobasket =

International youth basketball tournament

Tournament details
- Host country: Belize
- City: Belize City
- Dates: 26–30 July 2023
- Teams: 8 (from 1 confederation)
- Venue: 1 (in 1 host city)

Final positions
- Champions: Puerto Rico (6th title)
- Runners-up: Dominican Republic
- Third place: Belize

Official website
- www.fiba.basketball/history

The 2023 FIBA U17 Centrobasket was the ninth edition of the Central American and Caribbean basketball championship for men's under-17 national teams. The tournament was played at Belize City Civic Center in Belize City, Belize, from 26 to 30 July 2023.

Puerto Rico won its sixth title.

== Participating teams ==
- Belize
- Costa Rica
- Dominican Republic
- El Salvador
- Jamaica
- Mexico
- Panama
- Puerto Rico

== Group phase ==
In this round, the teams were drawn into two groups of four. The top two teams from each group advanced to the semifinals; the other teams advanced to the 5th–8th place playoffs.

All times are local (Central Standard Time – UTC-6).

=== Group A ===
Pos	Team	Pld	W	L	PF	PA	PD	Pts	Qualification
1	Puerto Rico	3	3	0	283	160	+123	6	Semifinals
2	Belize (H)	3	2	1	231	226	+5	5	Semifinals
3	Panama	3	1	2	189	211	−22	4	5th–8th place playoffs
4	Jamaica	3	0	3	165	271	−106	3	5th–8th place playoffs

Source: FIBA
(H) Hosts

26 July 2023
18:30

Boxscore

Jamaica	54–102	Puerto Rico
Scoring by quarter: 22–28, 12–24, 10–31, 10–19

Belize City Civic Center

26 July 2023
20:30

Boxscore

Panama	67–78	Belize
Scoring by quarter: 21–16, 14–21, 10–28, 22–13

Belize City Civic Center

27 July 2023
18:30

Boxscore

Puerto Rico	90–46	Panama
Scoring by quarter: 26–6, 18–19, 26–12, 20–9

Belize City Civic Center

27 July 2023
20:30

Boxscore

Belize	93–68	Jamaica
Scoring by quarter: 23–14, 21–8, 25–28, 24–18

Belize City Civic Center

28 July 2023
18:30

Boxscore

Jamaica	43–76	Panama
Scoring by quarter: 13–21, 10–17, 14–15, 6–23

Belize City Civic Center

28 July 2023
20:30

Boxscore

Belize	60–91	Puerto Rico
Scoring by quarter: 16–23, 16–23, 10–30, 18–15

Belize City Civic Center

=== Group B ===
Pos	Team	Pld	W	L	PF	PA	PD	Pts	Qualification
1	Dominican Republic	3	3	0	296	162	+134	6	Semifinals
2	Mexico	3	2	1	263	205	+58	5	Semifinals
3	Costa Rica	3	1	2	182	251	−69	4	5th–8th place playoffs
4	El Salvador	3	0	3	144	267	−123	3	5th–8th place playoffs

Source: FIBA

26 July 2023
14:00

Boxscore

Dominican Republic	102–51	Costa Rica
Scoring by quarter: 27–17, 26–9, 27–15, 22–10

Belize City Civic Center

26 July 2023
16:00

Boxscore

Mexico	99–48	El Salvador
Scoring by quarter: 20–12, 22–11, 20–12, 37–13

Belize City Civic Center

27 July 2023
14:00

Boxscore

El Salvador	44–99	Dominican Republic
Scoring by quarter: 16–19, 0–29, 17–25, 11–26

Belize City Civic Center

27 July 2023
16:00

Boxscore

Costa Rica	62–97	Mexico
Scoring by quarter: 11–18, 21–29, 16–32, 14–18

Belize City Civic Center

28 July 2023
14:00

Boxscore

Costa Rica	69–52	El Salvador
Scoring by quarter: 22–6, 11–10, 15–21, 21–15

Belize City Civic Center

28 July 2023
16:00

Boxscore

Mexico	67–95	Dominican Republic
Scoring by quarter: 20–24, 16–30, 19–20, 12–21

Belize City Civic Center

== 5th–8th place playoffs ==
5th–8th place semifinals
A3	Panama	73
B4	El Salvador	62
B3	Costa Rica	76
A4	Jamaica	77

5th place match
A3	Panama	83
A4	Jamaica	79
7th place match
B4	El Salvador	53
B3	Costa Rica	56

=== 5th–8th place semifinals ===
29 July 2023
14:00

Boxscore

Costa Rica	76–77	Jamaica
Scoring by quarter: 13–9, 13–22, 23–30, 27–16

Belize City Civic Center

29 July 2023
16:00

Boxscore

Panama	73–62	El Salvador
Scoring by quarter: 22–21, 16–13, 15–16, 20–12

Belize City Civic Center

=== 7th place match ===
30 July 2023
14:00

Boxscore

El Salvador	53–56	Costa Rica
Scoring by quarter: 13–11, 16–15, 11–14, 13–16

Belize City Civic Center

=== 5th place match ===
30 July 2023
16:00

Boxscore

Panama	83–79	Jamaica
Scoring by quarter: 21–25, 19–22, 17–26, 26–6

Belize City Civic Center

== Championship playoffs ==
Semifinals
A1	Puerto Rico	69
B2	Mexico	54
B1	Dominican Republic	95
A2	Belize	78

Final
A1	Puerto Rico	106
B1	Dominican Republic	57
3rd place match
B2	Mexico	72
A2	Belize	87

=== Semifinals ===
29 July 2023
18:30

Boxscore

Puerto Rico	69–54	Mexico
Scoring by quarter: 20–15, 22–8, 18–13, 9–18

Belize City Civic Center

29 July 2023
20:30

Boxscore

Dominican Republic	95–78	Belize
Scoring by quarter: 19–14, 17–19, 29–19, 30–26

Belize City Civic Center

=== 3rd place match ===
30 July 2023
18:30

Boxscore

Mexico	72–87	Belize
Scoring by quarter: 21–17, 22–23, 12–20, 17–27

Belize City Civic Center

=== Final ===
30 July 2023
20:30

Boxscore

Puerto Rico	106–57	Dominican Republic
Scoring by quarter: 31–19, 18–12, 26–7, 31–19

Belize City Civic Center

== Final standings ==
Rank	Team
1st place, gold medalist(s)	Puerto Rico
2nd place, silver medalist(s)	Dominican Republic
3rd place, bronze medalist(s)	Belize
4	Mexico
5	Panama
6	Jamaica
7	Costa Rica
8	El Salvador

Qualified for the 2024 FIBA U18 AmeriCup
