= FIBA U17 Centrobasket =

International youth basketball tournament

- Most recent season or competition: 2023 FIBA U17 Centrobasket
- Sport: Basketball
- Founded: 2007
- Organizing body: FIBA Americas
- No. of teams: 8 max
- Continent: Central America and the Caribbean
- Most recent champion: Puerto Rico (6th title)
- Most titles: Puerto Rico (6 titles)
- Qualification: FIBA Under-18 AmeriCup
- Related competitions: FIBA U15 Centrobasket
- Website: www.fiba.basketball/history

The FIBA U17 Centrobasket is a men's under-17 basketball tournament held every two years among 31 countries of Central America and the Caribbean and is organized in part by FIBA Americas. The tournament serves as a gateway to the FIBA Under-18 AmeriCup.

== Summary ==
| Year | Host | Gold | Silver | Bronze |
|---|---|---|---|---|
| 2007 | Puerto Rico (Humacao) | Puerto Rico | Mexico | Dominican Republic |
| 2009 | Mexico (Aguascalientes) | Puerto Rico | Mexico | Virgin Islands |
| 2011 | Puerto Rico (Gurabo) | Puerto Rico | Mexico | Virgin Islands |
| 2013 | Puerto Rico (Caguas) | Dominican Republic | Puerto Rico | Mexico |
| 2015 | Puerto Rico (San Juan) | Puerto Rico | Virgin Islands | Dominican Republic |
| 2017 | Dominican Republic (Santo Domingo) | Dominican Republic | Puerto Rico | Panama |
| 2019 | Puerto Rico (San Juan) | Mexico | Puerto Rico | Bahamas |
| 2021 | Mexico (Mexicali) | Puerto Rico | Mexico | Dominican Republic |
| 2023 | Belize (Belize City) | Puerto Rico | Dominican Republic | Belize |

== Medal table ==
| Rank | Nation | Gold | Silver | Bronze | Total |
|---|---|---|---|---|---|
| 1 | Puerto Rico | 6 | 3 | 0 | 9 |
| 2 | Dominican Republic | 2 | 1 | 3 | 6 |
| 3 | Mexico | 1 | 4 | 1 | 6 |
| 4 | Virgin Islands | 0 | 1 | 2 | 3 |
| 5 | Bahamas | 0 | 0 | 1 | 1 |
| 5 | Belize | 0 | 0 | 1 | 1 |
| 5 | Panama | 0 | 0 | 1 | 1 |
| Totals (7 entries) | | 9 | 9 | 9 | 27 |

== Participation details ==
| Team | (Puerto Rico); 2007 | (Mexico); 2009 | (Puerto Rico); 2011 | (Puerto Rico); 2013 | (Puerto Rico); 2015 | (Dominican Republic); 2017 | (Puerto Rico); 2019 | (Mexico); 2021 | (Belize); 2023 |
| Aruba | — | — | — | — | — | — | — | 8th | — |
| Bahamas | 4th | 5th | 4th | 5th | 5th | 7th | 3rd | — | — |
| Barbados | — | — | — | — | 8th | — | — | — | — |
| Belize | — | — | 6th | — | — | — | — | — | 3rd |
| British Virgin Islands | — | — | 7th | 7th | — | — | — | — | — |
| Costa Rica | — | — | — | 8th | 7th | — | — | 4th | 7th |
| Dominican Republic | 3rd | 4th | 5th | 1st | 3rd | 1st | 4th | 3rd | 2nd |
| El Salvador | — | — | — | 6th | — | — | 8th | 7th | 8th |
| Guatemala | — | 6th | — | — | 6th | — | — | — | — |
| Guyana | — | — | — | — | — | 8th | — | — | — |
| Jamaica | — | — | — | — | — | 6th | 7th | 6th | 6th |
| Mexico | 2nd | 2nd | 2nd | 3rd | 4th | 4th | 1st | 2nd | 4th |
| Nicaragua | — | 7th | — | — | — | — | — | — | — |
| Panama | — | — | 8th | — | — | 3rd | 5th | 5th | 5th |
| Puerto Rico | 1st | 1st | 1st | 2nd | 1st | 2nd | 2nd | 1st | 1st |
| Trinidad and Tobago | 6th | — | — | — | — | — | — | — | — |
| Virgin Islands | 5th | 3rd | 3rd | 4th | 2nd | 5th | 6th | — | — |
