= FIBA Americas =

Zone within FIBA (International Basketball Federation)

- Formation: October 11, 1975
- Type: Sports federation
- Headquarters: Miami, Florida
- Members: 42 national associations
- Official language: Spanish and English
- President: (United States) Fabian Borro
- Website: fiba.basketball/americas

FIBA Americas (Spanish: Confederación Panamericana de Baloncesto, French: FIBA Amériques) is a continental federation of FIBA (International Basketball Federation). It is one of FIBA's five continental zones. FIBA Americas is responsible for the organization and governance of the major international basketball competitions in the continent american América. The headquarters is located in Miami, Florida and the current President is Fabian Borro of the United States. The current Executive Director is Carlos Alves.

== Members ==
FIBA Americas has 42 affiliated members, divided into 4 regional zones.

- Caribbean (CBC): 23 members
- Central America (COCABA): 8 members
- North America: 2 members
- South America (CONSUBASQUET): 9 members

Country	Association	National teams	FIBA affiliation
Caribbean (CBC)
Antigua and Barbuda	Antigua & Barbuda Basketball Association	Men's; U19; U17; U15; Women's; U19; U17; U15	1976
Aruba	Aruba Basketball Bond	Men's; U19; U17; U15; Women's; U19; U17; U15	1986
Bahamas	Bahamas Basketball Federation	Men's; U19; U17; U15; Women's; U19; U17; U15	1962
Barbados	Barbados Amateur Basketball Association	Men's; U19; U17; U15; Women's; U19; U17; U15	1962
Bermuda (Note: Bermuda is a North American territory but a member of CBC (Caribbean zone).)	Bermuda Basketball Association	Men's; U19; U17; U15; Women's; U19; U17; U15	1998
British Virgin Islands	British Virgin Islands Amateur Basketball Federation	Men's; U19; U17; U15; Women's; U19; U17; U15	1979
Cayman Islands	Cayman Islands Basketball Association	Men's; U19; U17; U15; Women's; U19; U17; U15	1976
Cuba	Federación Cubana de Baloncesto	Men's; U19; U17; U15; Women's; U19; U17; U15	1937
Dominica	Dominica Amateur Basketball Association	Men's; U19; U17; U15; Women's; U19; U17; U15	1976
Dominican Republic	Asociación Dominicana de Baloncesto	Men's; U19; U17; U15; Women's; U19; U17; U15	1940
Grenada	Grenada National Basketball Association	Men's; U19; U17; U15; Women's; U19; U17; U15	1975
Guyana (Note: Suriname and Guyana are South American territories but members of CBC (Caribbean zone).)	Guyana Basketball Federation	Men's; U19; U17; U15; Women's; U19; U17; U15	1961
Haiti	Haitian Basketball Federation	Men's; U19; U17; U15; Women's; U19; U17; U15	1970
Jamaica	Jamaica Basketball Association	Men's; U19; U17; U15; Women's; U19; U17; U15	1962
Montserrat	Montserrat Amateur Basketball Association (MABA)	Men's; U19; U17; U15; Women's; U19; U17; U15	1986
Puerto Rico	Federación de Baloncesto de Puerto Rico	Men's; U19; U17; U15; Women's; U19; U17; U15	1957
Saint Kitts and Nevis	St. Kitts Amateur Basketball Association	Men's; U19; U17; U15; Women's; U19; U17; U15	1979
Saint Lucia	St. Lucia Basketball Federation	Men's; U19; U17; U15; Women's; U19; U17; U15	1997
Saint Vincent and the Grenadines	St. Vincent and the Grenadines Basketball Association	Men's; U19; U17; U15; Women's; U19; U17; U15	1984
Suriname	Surinamese Basketball Association	Men's; U19; U17; U15; Women's; U19; U17; U15	1959
Trinidad and Tobago	National Basketball Federation of Trinidad and Tobago	Men's; U19; U17; U15; Women's; U19; U17; U15	1958
Turks and Caicos Islands	Turks and Caicos Islands National Basketball	Men's; U19; U17; U15; Women's; U19; U17; U15	2002
Virgin Islands	Virgin Islands Basketball Federation	Men's; U19; U17; U15; Women's; U19; U17; U15	1964
Central America (COCABA)
Belize	Belize Basketball Federation	Men's; U19; U17; U15; Women's; U19; U17; U15	1973
Costa Rica	Federación Costarricense de Baloncesto Aficionado	Men's; U19; U17; U15; Women's; U19; U17; U15	1969
El Salvador	Federación Salvadoreña de Baloncesto	Men's; U19; U17; U15; Women's; U19; U17; U15	1956
Guatemala	Guatemala National Basketball Federation	Men's; U19; U17; U15; Women's; U19; U17; U15	1949
Honduras	Federación Nacional de Baloncesto de Honduras	Men's; U19; U17; U15; Women's; U19; U17; U15	1953
Mexico (Note: Mexico is a North American territory but a member of COCABA (Central America zone).)	Asociación Deportiva Mexicana de Básquetbol	Men's; U19; U17; U15; Women's; U19; U17; U15	1936
Nicaragua	Federación Nicaraguense de Baloncesto	Men's; U19; U17; U15; Women's; U19; U17; U15	1959
Panama	Federación Panameña de Baloncesto	Men's; U19; U17; U15; Women's; U19; U17; U15	1958
North America
Canada	Canada Basketball	Men's; U19; U17; U15; Women's; U19; U17; U15	1936
United States	USA Basketball	Men's; U19; U17; U15; Women's; U19; U17; U15	1934
South America (CONSUBASQUET)
Argentina	Confederación Argentina de Básquetbol	Men's; U19; U17; U15; Women's; U19; U17; U15	1932
Bolivia	Federación Boliviana de Básquetbol	Men's; U19; U17; U15; Women's; U19; U17; U15	1947
Brazil	Confederação Brasileira de Basketball	Men's; U19; U17; U15; Women's; U19; U17; U15	1935
Chile	Federación de Básquetbol de Chile	Men's; U19; U17; U15; Women's; U19; U17; U15	1935
Colombia	Federación Colombiana de Baloncesto	Men's; U19; U17; U15; Women's; U19; U17; U15	1939
Ecuador	Federación Ecuatoriana de Básquetbol	Men's; U19; U17; U15; Women's; U19; U17; U15	1950
Paraguay	Federación Paraguaya de Básquetebol	Men's; U19; U17; U15; Women's; U19; U17; U15	1947
~~Peru~~ (Note: Peru is not currently a member of FIBA Americas, Peru is not listed by FIBA as a member nation.)	~~Federación Peruana de Basketball~~	Men's; U19; U17; U15; Women's; U19; U17; U15	~~1936~~
Uruguay	Federación Uruguaya de Basketball	Men's; U19; U17; U15; Women's; U19; U17; U15	1936
Venezuela	Federación Venezolana de Baloncesto	Men's; U19; U17; U15; Women's; U19; U17; U15	1935

== Rankings ==
FIBA America zones

=== Overview ===
FIBA Men's Rankings (as of 1 September 2026)
Americas*	FIBA	±	National Team	Points
1	1	Steady	United States	952.3
2	5	Steady	Canada	863
3	8	Steady	Argentina	809.2
4	11	▼2	Brazil	799
5	17	▼1	Puerto Rico	698.8
6	21	Steady	Dominican Republic	605.2
7	26	▲2	Mexico	478.6
8	34	▼7	Venezuela	455
9	43	▼1	Uruguay	372.2
10	49	Steady	Bahamas	343
11	54	Steady	Colombia	316
12	56	Steady	Panama	290.4
13	59	▲1	Chile	270.7
14	70	▼3	Cuba	210.9
15	75	▼2	Nicaragua	185.6
16	79	▼1	Jamaica	157.7
17	86	▼1	Costa Rica	140.2
18	91	Steady	Virgin Islands	124.8
19	95	▼2	Paraguay	116.6
20	102	▼1	Barbados	101.5
21	103	▼1	El Salvador	100.5
22	106	▼3	Guyana	90.9
23	107	▼2	Antigua and Barbuda	88.6
24	108	▼2	Saint Vincent and the Grenadines	88.4
25	111	▼2	Honduras	84.4
26	114	▼2	Grenada	82.9
27	116	▼3	Ecuador	81.8
28	118	▼3	Guatemala	75.5
29	119	▼3	Bolivia	75.1
30	120	▼3	Bermuda	75
31	128	▼1	Belize	68.2
32	146	▼2	Haiti	38.5
33	150	▼2	Turks and Caicos Islands	18.7
34	151	▼2	Cayman Islands	15.8
35	152	▼2	Dominica	15.8
*Local rankings based on FIBA ranking points

FIBA Women's Rankings (as of 14 September 2026)
Americas*	FIBA	±	National Team	Points
1	1	Steady	United States	1076.1
2	10	▼1	Brazil	566.6
3	11	▼4	Canada	565.7
4	12	▲1	Puerto Rico	543.5
5	20	Steady	Colombia	318.6
6	23	▲4	Argentina	349.1
7	31	▼1	Mexico	258
8	36	▼3	Dominican Republic	229.1
9	49	▼3	Venezuela	173.8
10	50	▼3	Cuba	169.5
11	51	▼3	El Salvador	168
12	64	▼2	Virgin Islands	128.4
13	71	▼2	Chile	112.1
14	75	▼2	Paraguay	107.5
15	78	▼4	Guatemala	102.5
16	79	▼4	Costa Rica	102.1
17	86	Steady	Ecuador	79.6
18	87	Steady	Bahamas	78
19	91	Steady	Nicaragua	72.1
20	92	Steady	Bolivia	70.6
21	94	▼1	Barbados	69.5
22	96	▼1	Panama	67.1
23	97	▼1	Uruguay	65.9
24	98	▼1	Honduras	65.2
25	108	Steady	Suriname	47
26	109	Steady	Jamaica	43.3
27	118	▲1	Guyana	26.1
*Local rankings based on FIBA ranking points

==== Team of the Year ====
Teams ranking in the top four – Men's
Year	First	Second	Third	Fourth
2025	United States	Canada	Argentina	Brazil
2024	United States	Canada	Argentina	Brazil
2023	United States	Argentina	Brazil	Canada
2022	United States	Argentina	Brazil	Canada
2021	United States	Argentina	Brazil	Venezuela
2020	United States	Argentina	Brazil	Puerto Rico
2019	United States	Argentina	Brazil	Mexico
2018	United States	Argentina	Brazil	Mexico
2017	United States	Argentina	Brazil	Venezuela
2016	United States	Argentina	Brazil	Puerto Rico
2015	United States	Argentina	Brazil	Puerto Rico
2014	United States	Argentina	Brazil	Puerto Rico
2013	United States	Argentina	Brazil	Puerto Rico
2012	United States	Argentina	Brazil	Puerto Rico
2011	United States	Argentina	Puerto Rico	Brazil

Teams ranking in the top four – Women's
Year	First	Second	Third	Fourth
2025	United States	Canada	Brazil	Puerto Rico
2024	United States	Canada	Brazil	Puerto Rico
2023	United States	Canada	Puerto Rico	Brazil
2022	United States	Canada	Brazil	Puerto Rico
2021	United States	Canada	Brazil	Puerto Rico
2020	United States	Canada	Brazil	Puerto Rico
2019	United States	Canada	Brazil	Puerto Rico
2018	United States	Canada	Brazil	Cuba
2017	United States	Canada	Brazil	Cuba
2016	United States	Brazil	Canada	Cuba
2015	United States	Brazil	Canada	Cuba
2014	United States	Brazil	Canada	Argentina
2013	United States	Brazil	Canada	Argentina
2012	United States	Brazil	Canada	Argentina
2011	United States	Brazil	Cuba	Argentina

== Competitions ==
=== National teams ===
Men's competitions

Continental

- FIBA AmeriCup

Youth continental

- FIBA U18 AmeriCup
- FIBA U16 AmeriCup

Youth regional

- FIBA U17 Centrobasket
- FIBA U15 Centrobasket
- FIBA U17 South American Championship
- FIBA U15 South American Championship

(Defunct competitions)

- FIBA South American Championship
- FIBA Centrobasket
- FIBA COCABA Championship
- FIBA CBC Championship
- FIBA Americas U20 Championship
- FIBA U21 South American Championship
- FIBA U21 Centrobasket
- FIBA COCABA U21 Championship
- FIBA COCABA U17 Championship
- FIBA CBC U20 Championship

Women's competitions

Continental

- FIBA Women's AmeriCup

Regional

- FIBA South American Women's Championship
- FIBA Women's Centrobasket
- FIBA COCABA Women's Championship
- FIBA CBC Women's Championship

Youth continental

- FIBA U18 Women's AmeriCup
- FIBA U16 Women's AmeriCup

Youth regional

- FIBA U17 Women's Centrobasket
- FIBA U15 Women's Centrobasket
- FIBA U17 Women's South American Championship
- FIBA U15 Women's South American Championship

(Defunct competitions)

- FIBA Americas U20 Women's Championship
- FIBA South American U21 Women's Championship
- FIBA U21 Women's Centrobasket
- FIBA COCABA U21 Women's Championship
- FIBA COCABA U17 Women's Championship
- FIBA CBC U20 Women's Championship

=== Current champions ===
Tournament	Year	Champions
FIBA AmeriCup	2025	Brazil
FIBA Women's AmeriCup	2025	United States
FIBA U18 AmeriCup	2026	Canada
FIBA U18 Women's AmeriCup	2026	United States
FIBA U16 AmeriCup	2025	United States
FIBA U16 Women's AmeriCup	2025	United States
FIBA Women's Centrobasket	2026	Puerto Rico
FIBA U17 Centrobasket	2023	Puerto Rico
FIBA U17 Women's Centrobasket	2023	Puerto Rico
FIBA U15 Centrobasket	2024	Puerto Rico
FIBA U15 Women's Centrobasket	2024	Mexico
FIBA Women's South American Championship	2026	Argentina
FIBA U17 South American Championship	2025	Brazil
FIBA U17 Women's South American Championship	2025	Argentina
FIBA U15 South American Championship	2024	Venezuela
FIBA U15 Women's South American Championship	2024	Venezuela

=== Last champions of defunct events ===
Tournament	Year	Champions
FIBA Centrobasket	2016	Puerto Rico
FIBA South American Championship	2016	Venezuela

=== Clubs ===
Men's competitions

Continental

- Basketball Champions League Americas

Regional

- South American Basketball League

Women's competitions

Continental

- Women's Basketball League Americas

Regional

- South American Women's Basketball League

(Defunct competitions)

- FIBA Americas League
- Pan American Basketball Club Championship
- South American Basketball Club Championship
- Central America Basketball Club Championship

== See also ==
- FIBA Americas League
- Campeonato Panamericano de Clubes de Básquetbol
- Campeonato Sudamericano de Clubes Campeones de Básquetbol
