= 1987 FIBA Under-19 World Championship =

Third edition of the FIBA U-19 World Cup

1987 FIBA Under-19 Basketball World Cup
Tournament details
- Host country: Italy
- Dates: 29 July – 5 August
- Teams: 12
- Venue(s): 1 (in 1 host city)

Final positions
- Champions: Yugoslavia (1st title)

Tournament statistics
- MVP: (Socialist Federal Republic of Yugoslavia) Toni Kukoč
- Top scorer: (Nigeria) Lawal Garba (23.0)
- PPG (Team): Yugoslavia (108.9)

Official website
- 1987 FIBA U19 World Championship

The 1987 FIBA Under-19 World Championship (Italian: 1987 Campionato del mondo FIBA Under 19) was the 3rd edition of the FIBA U19 World Championship. It was held in Bormio, Italy from 29 July to 5 August 1987. Yugoslavia won their first and only U19 championship representing Yugoslavia, after beating the defending champions United States 86–76 in the final. Toni Kukoč was named the tournament MVP.

Several players who played at the tournament have been inducted into the FIBA Hall of Fame, including Vlade Divac and Toni Kukoč, and coach Svetislav Pešić, while Gary Payton, Dino Rađa, Kukoč, and Divac are members of the Naismith Memorial Basketball Hall of Fame.

== Venue ==
Bormio	Province of Sondrio
n/a	1987 FIBA Under-19 World Championship (Italy)
Capacity: n/a	1987 FIBA Under-19 World Championship (Italy)

== Qualification ==
Defending World Champions
Host country

FIBA Americas (4)	FIBA Europe (4)	FIBA Asia (2)	FIBA Africa (1)	FIBA Oceania (1)
United States	Italy	China	Nigeria	Australia
Brazil	Soviet Union	Chinese Taipei		
Canada	West Germany			
Puerto Rico	Yugoslavia			

== Preliminary round ==
=== Group A ===
Pos	Team	Pld	W	L	PF	PA	PD	Pts	Qualification
1	Yugoslavia	5	5	0	587	429	+158	10	Advance to Semifinals
2	United States	5	4	1	486	402	+84	9	Advance to Semifinals
3	Puerto Rico	5	3	2	456	499	−43	8	
4	Australia	5	2	3	435	420	+15	7	
5	China	5	1	4	390	388	+2	6	
6	Nigeria	5	0	5	378	494	−116	5	

Source: FIBA Archive

==== Matches ====
29 July 1987
10:00

Boxscore

Nigeria	79–105	Australia
Scoring by half: 35–56, 44–49
Pts: Odaudu 23		Pts: Vlahov 18

Bormio

29 July 1987
15:00

Boxscore

Yugoslavia	126–79	China
Scoring by half: 66–39, 60–40
Pts: Rađa 19		Pts: Song 19

Bormio

29 July 1987
20:00

Boxscore

United States	109–89	Puerto Rico
Scoring by half: 51–33, 58–56
Pts: Huery 20		Pts: Borges 23

Bormio

30 July 1987
10:00

Boxscore

Nigeria	82–126	Yugoslavia
Scoring by half: 40–73, 42–53
Pts: Garba 29		Pts: Rađa 19

Bormio

30 July 1987
12:00

Boxscore

Puerto Rico	101–91	China
Scoring by half: 45–55, 56–36
Pts: Muñoz 25		Pts: Chen 28

Bormio

30 July 1987
20:00

Boxscore

United States	84–80	Australia
Scoring by half: 44–34, 40–46
Pts: Thompson, Simmons, Williams 14		Pts: Heal 21

Bormio

31 July 1987
10:00

Boxscore

Puerto Rico	77–76	Nigeria
Scoring by half: 45–46, 32–30
Pts: Rolon, Bocachica 16		Pts: Garba 34

Bormio

31 July 1987
12:00

Boxscore

Australia	73–86	Yugoslavia
Scoring by half: 39–45, 34–41
Pts: Bradtke 11		Pts: Rađa 23

Bormio

31 July 1987
15:00

Boxscore

United States	100–50	China
Scoring by half: 44–27, 56–23
Pts: Simmons 19		Pts: Song 14

Bormio

1 August 1987
10:00

Boxscore

China	88–68	Nigeria
Scoring by half: 41–32, 47–36
Pts: Song 25		Pts: Garba 18

Bormio

1 August 1987
12:00

Boxscore

Australia	84–89	Puerto Rico
Scoring by half: 40–45, 44–44
Pts: Bradtke 18		Pts: Muñoz 28

Bormio

1 August 1987
12:00

Boxscore

United States	95–110	Yugoslavia
Scoring by half: 42–52, 53–58
Pts: Simmons 20		Pts: Kukoč 37

Bormio

2 August 1987
10:00

Boxscore

China	82–93	Australia
Scoring by half: 40–47, 42–46
Pts: Chen, Zheng 24		Pts: Bradtke 24

Bormio

2 August 1987
17:00

Boxscore

Yugoslavia	139–100	Puerto Rico
Scoring by half: 62–40, 77–60
Pts: Pecarski 22		Pts: Borges 19

Bormio

2 August 1987
20:00

Boxscore

United States	98–73	Nigeria
Scoring by half: 55–33, 43–40
Pts: Simmons 14		Pts: Garba 18

Bormio

=== Group B ===
Pos	Team	Pld	W	L	PF	PA	PD	Pts	Qualification
1	Italy	5	4	1	453	393	+60	9	Advance to Semifinals
2	West Germany	5	3	2	392	417	−25	8 (Note: West Germany 2–0; Soviet Union 1–1; Canada 0–2;)	Advance to Semifinals
3	Soviet Union	5	3	2	381	333	+48	8	
4	Canada	5	3	2	426	380	+46	8	
5	Brazil	5	2	3	426	435	−9	7	
6	Chinese Taipei	5	0	5	356	476	−120	5	

Source: FIBA Archive

==== Matches ====
29 July 1987
12:00

Boxscore

Chinese Taipei	76–102	Italy
Scoring by half: 47–53, 29–49
Pts: Cheng 19		Pts: Rusconi 26

Bormio

29 July 1987
17:00

Boxscore

West Germany	88–82	Canada
Scoring by half: 39–39, 49–43
Pts: Rödl 26		Pts: Johnson 19

Bormio

29 July 1987
22:00

Boxscore

Brazil	64–89	Soviet Union
Scoring by half: 32–38, 32–51
Pts: Bavaresco 19		Pts: Orekhov 18

Bormio

30 July 1987
17:00

Boxscore

West Germany	67–87	Italy
Scoring by half: 28–34, 39–53
Pts: Kleine-Brockhoff 16		Pts: Niccolai 17

Bormio

30 July 1987
20:00

Boxscore

Chinese Taipei	78–94	Brazil
Scoring by half: 46–52, 32–42
Pts: Lii 23		Pts: Bavaresco 19

Bormio

30 July 1987
22:00

Boxscore

Canada	65–76	Soviet Union
Scoring by half: 34–37, 31–39
Pts: Stewart 14		Pts: Vētra 21

Bormio

31 July 1987
17:00

Boxscore

Italy	102–97	Brazil
Scoring by half: 54–50, 48–47
Pts: Aldi 21		Pts: Bernardini 27

Bormio

31 July 1987
20:00

Boxscore

Canada	107–60	Chinese Taipei
Scoring by half: 50–30, 57–30
Pts: G. McKay 30		Pts: Lii 13

Bormio

31 July 1987
22:00

Boxscore

West Germany	67–66	Soviet Union
Scoring by half: 35–39, 32–27
Pts: Harnisch 18		Pts: Babkov 16

Bormio

1 August 1987
15:00

Boxscore

West Germany	77–97	Brazil
Scoring by half: 44–46, 33–51
Pts: Harnisch 21		Pts: Bavaresco 22

Bormio

1 August 1987
17:00

Boxscore

Italy	82–83	Canada
Scoring by half: 37–42, 45–41
Pts: Gentile, Rusconi 21		Pts: Jackson 13

Bormio

1 August 1987
22:00

Boxscore

Soviet Union	80–57	Chinese Taipei
Scoring by half: 39–33, 41–24
Pts: Babkov 19		Pts: Chu 18

Bormio

2 August 1987
12:00

Boxscore

Brazil	74–89	Canada
Scoring by half: 30–34, 44–55
Pts: Bavaresco 27		Pts: Jackson 17

Bormio

2 August 1987
15:00

Boxscore

West Germany	93–85	Chinese Taipei
Scoring by half: 52–45, 41–40
Pts: Harnisch 27		Pts: Cheng 28

Bormio

2 August 1987
22:00

Boxscore

Soviet Union	70–80	Italy
Scoring by half: 34–43, 36–37
Pts: Meleshenko 22		Pts: Niccolai 24

Bormio

== Final round ==
=== Classification 5th-12th ===
5–8th place bracket

5th-8th Semifinals
3 August
Puerto Rico	89
Canada	96
3 August
Soviet Union	76
Australia	78

Fifth place
4 August
Canada	68
Australia	74
Seventh place
4 August
Puerto Rico	86
Soviet Union	100

==== 5th-8th Semifinals ====
3 August 1987
17:00

Boxscore

Puerto Rico	89–96	Canada
Scoring by half: 46–54, 43–42
Pts: Borges 23		Pts: Johnson 22

Bormio

3 August 1987
19:00

Boxscore

Soviet Union	76–78	Australia
Scoring by half: 45–41, 31–37
Pts: Meleshenko 14		Pts: Vlahov 26

Bormio

9–12th place bracket

9th-12th Semifinals
3 August
China	93
Chinese Taipei	77
3 August
Brazil	79
Nigeria	67

Ninth place
4 August
China	98
Brazil	85
Eleventh place
4 August
Chinese Taipei	90
Nigeria	81

==== 9th-12th Semifinals ====
3 August 1987
10:00

Boxscore

China	93–77	Chinese Taipei
Scoring by half: 52–36, 41–41
Pts: Song 26		Pts: Lii 23

Bormio

3 August 1987
12:00

Boxscore

Brazil	79–67	Nigeria
Scoring by half: 50–48, 29–19
Pts: Manna 26		Pts: Garba 20

Bormio

=== 11th place game ===
4 August 1987
10:00

Boxscore

Nigeria	81–90	Chinese Taipei
Scoring by half: 34–37, 47–53
Pts: Garba 35		Pts: Cheng 32

Bormio

=== 9th place game ===
4 August 1987
12:00

Boxscore

China	98–85	Brazil
Scoring by half: 51–45, 47–40
Pts: Zheng 34		Pts: Bavaresco 23

Bormio

=== 7th place game ===
4 August 1987
22:00

Boxscore

Canada	68–74	Australia
Scoring by half: 36–37, 32–37
Pts: J. McKay 16		Pts: Stelzer 21

Bormio

=== 5th place game ===
4 August 1987
15:00

Boxscore

Puerto Rico	86–100	Soviet Union
Scoring by half: 52–50, 34–50
Pts: Muñoz 23		Pts: Vētra 19

Bormio

=== Semifinals ===
Semifinals
4 August
Yugoslavia	89
West Germany	64
4 August
Italy	84
United States	89

Final
5 August
Yugoslavia	86
United States	76
Third place
5 August
West Germany	66
Italy	77

Source: FIBA Archive

4 August 1987
17:00

Boxscore

United States	89–84	Italy
Scoring by half: 46–44, 43–40
Pts: Thompson 25		Pts: Tolotti 21

Bormio

4 August 1987
20:00

Boxscore

Yugoslavia	89–64	West Germany
Scoring by half: 46–28, 43–36
Pts: Kukoč 20		Pts: Harnisch 13

Bormio

=== Bronze medal match ===
5 August 1987
16:00

Boxscore

Italy	77–66	West Germany
Scoring by half: 40–26, 37–40
Pts: Pessina 16		Pts: Rödl 18

Bormio

=== Final ===
5 August 1987
18:00

Boxscore

Yugoslavia	86–76	United States
Scoring by half: 40–43, 46–33
Pts: Divac 21		Pts: Pritchard 15

Bormio

== Final standings ==
Rank	Team	Record
1st place, gold medalist(s)	Yugoslavia	7–0
2nd place, silver medalist(s)	United States	5–2
3rd place, bronze medalist(s)	Italy	5–2
4th	West Germany	3–4
5th	Australia	4–3
6th	Canada	4–3
7th	Soviet Union	4–3
8th	Puerto Rico	3–4
9th	China	3–4
10th	Brazil	3–4
11th	Chinese Taipei	1–6
12th	Nigeria	0–7

Source: FIBA Archive

== Medal rosters ==
(gold) (Socialist Federal Republic of Yugoslavia) 4 Zoran Kalpić, 5 Luka Pavićević, 6 Nebojša Ilić, 7 Toni Kukoč, 8 Miroslav Pecarski, 9 Teoman Alibegović, 10 Aleksandar Đorđević, 11 Samir Avdić, 12 Vlade Divac, 13 Radenko Dobraš, 14 Dino Rađa, 15 Slaviša Koprivica (Head coach: Svetislav Pešić)

(silver) (United States) 4 Kevin Pritchard, 5 Larry Johnson, 6 Gary Payton, 7 Stephen Thompson, 8 LaBradford Smith, 9 Lionel Simmons, 10 Scott Williams, 11 Stacey Augmon, 12 Robert Brickey, 13 Ron Huery, 14 Dwayne Schintzius, 15 Brian Williams (Head coach: Larry Brown)

(bronze) (Italy) 4 Sandro Brusamarello, 5 Nando Gentile, 6 Riccardo Pittis, 7 Massimiliano Aldi, 8 Stefano Rusconi, 9 Andrea Niccolai, 10 Michele Zeno, 11 Davide Pessina, 12 Alberto Ballestra, 13 Gustavo Tolotti, 14 Giovanni Savio, 15 Gennaro Palmieri (Head coach: ?)

== Awards ==
1987 FIBA Under-19 World Championship

Yugoslavia
First title

Most Valuable Player
(Socialist Federal Republic of Yugoslavia) Toni Kukoč
