= Syria men's national under-19 basketball team =

Syria
- FIBA ranking: 94 ▼3 (December 2025)
- Joined FIBA: 1948
- FIBA zone: FIBA Asia
- National federation: Syrian Basketball Federation
- Coach: Youssef Azghen
- Nickname(s): Nosour Qasioun (Arabic: نسور قاسيون, lit. 'Qasioun Eagles')

U19 World Cup
- Appearances: 2 (1991, 2009)
- Medals: None

U18 Asia Cup
- Appearances: 8
- Medals: Silver: 1 (1990); Bronze: 1 (2008)

U18 West Asia Championship
- Appearances: 2
- Medals: Silver: 1 (2022); Bronze: 1 (2018)
Home	Away

The Syria men's national under-18 and under-19 basketball team is a national basketball team of Syria, administered by the Syrian Basketball Federation. It represents the country in international under-18 and under-19 men's basketball competitions.

== History ==
The team won the silver medal at the 1990 ABC Under-18 Championship after ceding to Japan in the final. With this placement, the team led by the great player Anwar Abdoul Hay qualified for the 1991 FIBA Under-19 World Championship, where after losing 80-113 to Brazil, 99-88 to the Soviet Union and 67-80 to Yugoslavia in the basic group, they fought their way into the playoffs. In the battle for placement, they first won with Uruguay 79-78, then with Australia 76-72 and with Japan 93-79. Although they lost to China and Australia in the next two matches, they placed in a record twelfth place.

After an unexpected third place at the 2008 Asian Championship, the Syrian team qualified to the 2009 FIBA Under-19 World Championship held in Auckland, New Zealand. They remained winless after defeats by Spain, Canada and Australia and finished the tournament in last position.

== Competition record ==
=== FIBA Under-19 World Cup ===
FIBA Under-19 World Cup record
Year	Position	Pld	W	L
(Brazil) 1979 to (Italy) 1987	Did not qualify			
(Canada) 1991	12th place	8	3	5
(Greece) 1995 to (Serbia) 2007	Did not qualify			
(New Zealand) 2009	16th place	5	0	5
(Latvia) 2011 to (Czech Republic) 2027	Did not qualify			
(Indonesia) 2029	To be determined			
Total	2/19	13	3	10

=== FIBA Under-18 Asia Cup ===
FIBA Under-18 Asia Cup record
Year	Position	Pld	W	L
(South Korea) 1970	Did not qualify			
(Philippines) 1972	Did not qualify			
(Philippines) 1974	Did not qualify			
(Kuwait) 1977	Did not qualify			
(Philippines) 1978	Did not qualify			
(Thailand) 1980	Did not qualify			
(Philippines) 1982	Did not qualify			
(South Korea) 1984	Did not qualify			
(Philippines) 1986	Did not qualify			
(Philippines) 1989	Did not qualify			
(Japan) 1990	2nd place	5	3	2
(China) 1992	Did not qualify			
(Philippines) 1995	Did not qualify			
(Malaysia) 1996	Did not qualify			
(India) 1998	Did not qualify			
(Malaysia) 2000	Did not qualify			
(Kuwait) 2002	Did not qualify			
(India) 2004	Did not qualify			
(China) 2006	9th place	7	4	3
(Iran) 2008	3rd place	7	3	4
(Yemen) 2010	9th place	8	4	4
(Mongolia) 2012	9th place	8	5	3
(Qatar) 2014	Did not qualify			
(Iran) 2016	Did not qualify			
(Thailand) 2018	15th place	3	0	3
(Iran) 2022	10th place	3	0	3
(Jordan) 2024	Did not qualify			
(India) 2026	10th place	4	1	3
Total	0 golds, 1 silver, 1 bronze	45	20	25

=== West Asia Under-18 Championship ===
West Asia Under-18 Championship Record
Year	Position	Pld	W	L
(Jordan) 2018	3rd place	4	2	2
(Syria) 2022	2nd place	5	2	3
Total	0 golds, 1 silver, 1 bronze	9	4	5

== Team roster ==
=== Current roster ===
Syria roster at the 2022 FIBA U18 Asian Championship:

Syria men's national under-19 basketball team roster
Players
Coaches

Pos.	No.	Name	Age – Date of birth	Height	Club	Ctr.
G	00	Jad Aldassouki	18 – 12 January 2004	1.86 m (6 ft 1 in)	Al-Jaish	(Syria)
PG	3	Anas Al Hajji	17 – 10 July 2005	1.80 m (5 ft 11 in)	Al-Wahda	(Syria)
G	4	Mahmoud Khantoumani	17 – 1 September 2004	1.85 m (6 ft 1 in)	Al-Wathba	(Syria)
G	6	Michel Essa	18 – 1 January 2004	1.83 m (6 ft 0 in)	Al-Thawra	(Syria)
C	11	Mohamed Eid	18 – 1 January 2004	1.95 m (6 ft 5 in)	Tishreen BC	(Syria)
G	12	George Kastntin	18 – 4 January 2004	1.85 m (6 ft 1 in)	Al-Jalaa	(Syria)
G	13	Abdulaziz Dabdoob	18 – 1 January 2004	1.97 m (6 ft 6 in)	Al-Wathba SC	(Syria)
C	15	Issa Mousa	18 – 28 January 2004	1.93 m (6 ft 4 in)	Al-Karamah	(Syria)
SF	16	Majed Harami	18 – 3 June 2004	1.90 m (6 ft 3 in)	Al Wahda
G	30	Mohammad AlHaj Ibrahim	18 – 14 April 2004	1.88 m (6 ft 2 in)		(Syria)
C	33	Omar Alfarouk Makanas	18 – 3 July 2004	2.07 m (6 ft 9 in)		(Syria)
G	77	Mohamed Tallaj	17 – 1 January 2005	1.90 m (6 ft 3 in)		(Syria)

Head coach

- (Syria) Youssef Azghen

Legend

- (C) Team captain
- (NP) Naturalized player
- Club – describes last
  club before the tournament
- Age – describes age
  on 20 August 2022

== See also ==
- Syria men's national basketball team
- Syria men's national under-16 basketball team
- Syria women's national under-18 basketball team
