= Basketball at the 2022 Bolivarian Games =

Basketball competitions at the 2022 Bolivarian Games

- Basketball pictogram
- Venue: Coliseo Óscar Muñoz Oviedo
- Dates: 24 June – 5 July 2022
- Competitors: 108 from 7 nations
- Teams: 9 (4 men and 5 women)

Basketball competitions at the 2022 Bolivarian Games in Valledupar, Colombia will be held from 24 June to 5 July 2022 at Coliseo Óscar Muñoz Oviedo.

Two medal events are scheduled to be contested: a boys' and women's tournaments. A total of 108 athletes (48 athletes–4 teams for men and 60 athletes–5 teams for women) will compete in the events. The boys' tournament is restricted to under-19 players while the women's tournament is an open competition without age restrictions.

Hosts Colombia are the defending gold medalists in both boys' and women's events.

== Participating nations ==
A total of 7 nations (5 ODEBO nations and 2 invited) registered teams for the basketball events. Each nation was able to enter a maximum of 24 athletes (one team of 12 athletes per gender). Hosts Colombia and Venezuela will participate in both events. Bolivia and Panama will participate in the boys' tournament while Chile, Dominican Republic and Guatemala will participate in the women's tournament.

- Bolivia (12 athletes)
- Chile (12)
- Colombia (24)
- Dominican Republic (12)
- Guatemala (12)
- Panama (12)
- Venezuela (24)

== Medal summary ==
=== Medal table ===
* Host nation (Host nation)

Rank	Nation	Gold	Silver	Bronze	Total
1	Colombia (COL)*	2	0	0	2
2	Chile (CHI)	0	1	0	1
2	Panama (PAN)	0	1	0	1
4	Dominican Republic (DOM)	0	0	1	1
4	Venezuela (VEN)	0	0	1	1
Totals (5 entries)		2	2	2	6

=== Medalists ===
Event	Gold	Silver	Bronze
Men's tournament	Colombia; Christian Bernard; Darwin Blanco; Hernán Cortez; Andrés Jaimes; Juan José Lozano; Edwin Niebles; David Ojeda; Kadir Pomare; Juan José Quiñones; Juan Fernando Salcedo; Daniel Felipe Sánchez; Paulo Valdelamar	Panama; Ramsés Cajar; Aldimir Castillo; Hamurabis De León; Diego Duque; Fernando González; Humberto Kentish; Bryan Lasso; Joshua Lemon; Arturo Molina; Guillermo Navarro; Emanuel Periñán; Andrés Vergara	Venezuela; Gregori Berroterán; Johendry Curiel; Jonathan Griman; Yeferson Guerra; Jesús López; Keiver Marcano; Mayron Martínez; Carlos Mijares; Enmanuel Morles; Oswaldo Sotilo; Diego Sulbarán; Anthoan Urbina
Women's tournament	Colombia; Yanet Arias; Mayra Caicedo; Laura Garrido; Daniela Gonzalez; Carolina Lopez; Mabel Martinez; Jenifer Muñoz; Yuliany Paz; Diana Prens; Manuela Rios; Isabel Roriguez; Marlyn Vente	Chile; Catalina Abuyeres; Gabriela Ahumada; Constanza Cardenas; Thiare Garcia; Javiera Morales; Javiera Novion; Valentina Ojeda; Fernanda Ovalle; Catalina Pérez; Macarena Retamales; Yenicel Torres; Josefina Viafora	Dominican Republic; Solmilena Arias; Cesarina Capellan; Elemi Caridad; Naomy Cuevas; Angela Jimenez; Rocio Jimenez; Yenifer Jimenez; Yohanna Morton; Gioselis Reynoso; Yamile Rodriguez; Isamery Telleria; Julady Zapata

== Venue ==
All matches in both events will be played at Coliseo Óscar Muñoz Oviedo which is part of the Centro de Alto Rendimiento Deportivo La Gota Fría in Valledupar. The Coliseo Óscar Muñoz Oviedo has a capacity for 900 people.

== Boys' tournament ==
2022 Bolivarian Games Men's Basketball tournament
Juegos Bolivarianos 2022 Campeonato de Baloncesto Masculino Sub-19

Tournament details
- Host country: Colombia
- City: Valledupar
- Dates: 24–28 June
- Teams: 4 (from 2 confederations)
- Venue: 1 (in 1 host city)

Tournament statistics
- Top scorer: (Venezuela) Mayron Martínez (48 points)

Official website
- Tournament website

The boys' tournament will be held from 24–28 June 2022 and consists of a preliminary round (group stage) and a final round.

All match times are in COT (UTC−5).

=== Preliminary round ===
The preliminary round consists of a single group of 4 teams in which each team will play once against the other 3 teams in the group on a single round-robin basis, with all the 4 teams advancing to the semi-finals.

Pos	Team	Pld	W	L	PF	PA	PD	Pts
1	Panama	3	3	0	229	191	+38	6
2	Colombia (H)	3	1	2	233	198	+35	4
3	Venezuela	3	2	1	224	179	+45	5
4	Bolivia	3	0	3	155	273	−118	3

Source: Bolivarianos Valledupar 2022
Rules for classification: 1) Points; 2) Head-to-head results; 3) Points difference; 4) Points scored.
(H) Hosts

24 June 2022
9:00

Report

Panama	66–60	Venezuela
Scoring by quarter: 18–15, 12–12, 15–19, 21–14
Pts: Aldimir Castillo 16		Pts: Mayron Martinez 14

Coliseo Óscar Muñoz Oviedo
Referees: R. Mejía, R. Millán, A. Quintero

24 June 2022
11:30

Report

Bolivia	52–92	Colombia
Scoring by quarter: 12–18, 8–28, 16–28, 16–18
Pts: three players 8		Pts: two players 16

Coliseo Óscar Muñoz Oviedo
Referees: Y. Carreño, C. García, C. Guzmán

25 June 2022
17:00

Report

Bolivia	38–87	Venezuela
Scoring by quarter: 12–13, 9–20, 11–29, 6–25
Pts: Samuel Suárez 10		Pts: Carlos Mijares 15

Coliseo Óscar Muñoz Oviedo
Referees: C. García, L. Bedoya, R. Millán

25 June 2022
19:00

Report

Panama	69–66	Colombia
Scoring by quarter: 17–19, 16–16, 17–12, 19–19
Pts: Guillermo Navarro 23		Pts: Kadir Pomare 20

Coliseo Óscar Muñoz Oviedo
Referees: R. León, Y. Carreño, A. Quintero

26 June 2022
17:00

Report

Bolivia	65–94	Panama
Scoring by quarter: 20–9, 15–23, 14–28, 16–34
Pts: Jose María Moreno 14		Pts: Joshua Lemon 23

Coliseo Óscar Muñoz Oviedo
Referees: R. Mejía, C. García, A. Quintero

26 June 2022
19:20

Report

Colombia	75–77 (OT)	Venezuela
Scoring by quarter: 11–9, 12–17, 21–24, 21–15, Overtime: 10–12
Pts: Darwin Blanco 18		Pts: Mayron Martínez 30

Coliseo Óscar Muñoz Oviedo
Referees: Y. Carreño, C. Guzmán, R. Millán

=== Final round ===
The final round consists of the semi-finals and the bronze and gold medal matches. The semi-finals match-ups are:

- Semifinal 1: Prel. round 2nd place v Prel. round 3rd place
- Semifinal 2: Prel. round 1st place v Prel. round 4th place

Winners of semi-finals will play the gold medal match, while losers will play the bronze medal match.

Semi-finals
Panama	80
Bolivia	26
Venezuela	51
Colombia	74

Gold medal match
Panama	61
Colombia	72
Bronze medal match
Venezuela	75
Bolivia	43

==== Semi-finals ====
27 June 2022
17:00

Report

Panama	80–26	Bolivia
Scoring by quarter: 23–10, 22–3, 14–7, 21–6
Pts: Arturo Molina, Humberto Kentish 12		Pts: Pablo Arteaga 7

Coliseo Óscar Muñoz Oviedo
Referees: Y. Carreño, C. Guzmán, C. García

27 June 2022
19:00

Report

Venezuela	51–74	Colombia
Scoring by quarter: 13–20, 9–18, 15–23, 14–13
Pts: Keiver Marcano 12		Pts: Daniel Sánchez 23

Coliseo Óscar Muñoz Oviedo
Referees: R. Mejía, L. Bedoya, A. Quintero

==== Bronze medal match ====
28 June 2022
17:00

Report

Venezuela	75–43	Bolivia
Scoring by quarter: 21–7, 23–9, 14–8, 17–19
Pts: Keiver Marcano 23		Pts: Alejandro Alba 16

Coliseo Óscar Muñoz Oviedo
Referees: R. Mejía, C. García, C. Guzmán

==== Gold medal match ====
28 June 2022
19:00

Report

Panama	61–72	Colombia
Scoring by quarter: 9–15, 15–19, 19–21, 18–17
Pts: Guillermo Navarro 14		Pts: Daniel Sánchez 22

Coliseo Óscar Muñoz Oviedo
Referees: Y. Carreño, L. Bedoya, A. Quintero

== Women's tournament ==
2022 Bolivarian Games Women's Basketball tournament
Juegos Bolivarianos 2022 Campeonato de Baloncesto Femenino

Tournament details
- Host country: Colombia
- City: Valledupar
- Dates: 30 June–5 July
- Teams: 4 (from 2 confederations)
- Venue: 1 (in 1 host city)

Tournament statistics
- Games played: 2

The women's tournament will be held from 1 to 5 July 2022 and consists of a preliminary round (group stage) and a final round.

All match times are in COT (UTC−5).

=== Preliminary round ===
The preliminary round consists of a single group of 5 teams in which each team will play once against the other 4 teams in the group on a single round-robin basis. The top two teams will advance to the gold medal match and teams placed third and fourth will play for the bronze medal.

Pos	Team	Pld	W	L	PF	PA	PD	Pts	Qualification
1	Colombia (H)	2	2	0	149	58	+91	4	Gold medal match
2	Chile	1	1	0	40	28	+12	2	Gold medal match
3	Dominican Republic	2	1	1	94	115	−21	3	Bronze medal match
4	Guatemala	2	0	2	52	129	−77	2	Bronze medal match
5	Venezuela	1	0	1	55	60	−5	1	

Source: Bolivarianos Valledupar 2022
Rules for classification: 1) Points; 2) Head-to-head results; 3) Points difference; 4) Points scored.
(H) Hosts

30 June 2022
19:00

Report

Dominican Republic	60–55	Venezuela
Scoring by quarter: 15–15, 19–5, 8–16, 18–19
Pts: Capellan 19		Pts: Pico 12

Coliseo Óscar Muñoz Oviedo

30 June 2022
21:00

Report

Guatemala	24–89	Colombia
Scoring by quarter: 8–19, 4–15, 10–37, 2–18
Pts: Cano 7		Pts: Paz 14

Coliseo Óscar Muñoz Oviedo

2 July 2022
17:00

Report

Guatemala	28–40	Chile
Scoring by quarter: 6–11, 5–8, 6–9, 11–12
Pts: Retamales Leiva 8		Pts: Cano 7

Coliseo Óscar Muñoz Oviedo

2 July 2022
19:00

Report

Dominican Republic	34–60	Colombia
Scoring by quarter: 7–16, 6–19, 13–14, 8–11
Pts: Colomé 11		Pts: González 17

Coliseo Óscar Muñoz Oviedo

3 July 2022
17:00

[ Report]

Venezuela	vs.	Guatemala
Scoring by quarter: –, –, –, –

Coliseo Óscar Muñoz Oviedo

3 July 2022
19:00

[ Report]

Chile	vs.	Colombia
Scoring by quarter: –, –, –, –

Coliseo Óscar Muñoz Oviedo

4 July 2022
9:00

[ Report]

Guatemala	vs.	Dominican Republic
Scoring by quarter: –, –, –, –

Coliseo Óscar Muñoz Oviedo

4 July 2022
11:00

[ Report]

Venezuela	vs.	Chile
Scoring by quarter: –, –, –, –

Coliseo Óscar Muñoz Oviedo

4 July 2022
17:00

[ Report]

Chile	vs.	Dominican Republic
Scoring by quarter: –, –, –, –

Coliseo Óscar Muñoz Oviedo

4 July 2022
19:00

[ Report]

Colombia	vs.	Venezuela
Scoring by quarter: –, –, –, –

Coliseo Óscar Muñoz Oviedo

=== Bronze medal match ===
5 July 2022
13:00

[ Report]

Prel. round 3rd place	vs.	Prel. round 4th place
Scoring by quarter: –, –, –, –

Coliseo Óscar Muñoz Oviedo

=== Gold medal match ===
5 July 2022
15:00

[ Report]

Prel. round 1st place	vs.	Prel. round 2nd place
Scoring by quarter: –, –, –, –

Coliseo Óscar Muñoz Oviedo
