= 2015 FIBA U17 South American Championship =

International basketball competition

Tournament details
- Host country: Argentina
- City: Resistencia
- Dates: 13–19 September 2015
- Teams: 9 (from 1 confederation)
- Venue: 1 (in 1 host city)

Final positions
- Champions: Argentina (14th title)
- Runners-up: Brazil
- Third place: Chile

Tournament statistics
- Top scorer: (Peru) Venegas (23.8)
- Top rebounds: (Paraguay) Poisson (15.6)
- Top assists: (Argentina) Corvalan (4.8)

Official website
- FIBA Americas (Wayback Machine)

The 2015 FIBA U17 South American Championship was the 23rd edition of the South American basketball championship for under-17 men's national teams. Eight teams featured the competition, held in Resistencia, Argentina, from 13 to 19 September 2015. The top three teams qualified for the 2016 FIBA Americas Under-18 Championship.

== Group stage ==
=== Group A ===
Pos	Team	Pld	W	L	PF	PA	PD	Pts	Qualification
1	Argentina	3	3	0	240	154	+86	6	Advance to Semifinals
2	Chile	3	2	1	196	184	+12	5	Advance to Semifinals
3	Uruguay	3	1	2	185	181	+4	4	Classification 5-8
4	Ecuador	3	0	3	139	241	−102	3	Classification 5-8

Source: fiba.com

15 September 2015
18:00

Boxscore

Uruguay	57–58 (OT)	Chile
Scoring by quarter: 12-10, 5-14, 21-9, 9-14, Overtime: 10-11
Pts: Rojas 18; Rebs: Rojas 16; Asts: Rojas, Sarni 2		Pts: Haase 17; Rebs: Arroyo 7 Asts: Aguirre 5

Resistencia (ARG)

15 September 2015
21:00

Boxscore

Argentina	98–31	Ecuador
Scoring by quarter: 23-8, 30-14, 20-8, 25-1
Pts: Fernandez 16; Rebs: Vaulet 12; Asts: Corvalan 7		Pts: Cardenas 10; Rebs: 3 players 5 Asts: Infante 2

Resistencia (ARG)

16 September 2015
18:45

Boxscore

Ecuador	55–74	Uruguay
Scoring by quarter: 12-24, 19-14, 7-21, 17-15
Pts: Bedoya 11; Rebs: Andrade 6 Asts: 3 players 2		Pts: Rojas 21; Rebs: Ducasse 8 Asts: Sarni 4

Resistencia (ARG)

16 September 2015
21:00

Boxscore

Chile	69–74	Argentina
Scoring by quarter: 17-18, 16-17, 13-26, 23-13
Pts: Aguirre 22; Rebs: Soulodre 11; Asts: Aguirre 5		Pts: Solanas 27; Rebs: Vaulet 12; Asts: Vaulet 5

Resistencia (ARG)

17 September 2015
18:45

Boxscore

Chile	69–53	Ecuador
Scoring by quarter: 12-18, 20-17, 21-13, 16-5
Pts: Aguirre 19; Rebs: Schwerter 7 Asts: Aguirre 6		Pts: Cardenas 17; Rebs: Cardenas 13; Asts: 4 players 1

Resistencia (ARG)

17 September 2015
21:00

Boxscore

Argentina	68–54	Uruguay
Scoring by quarter: 9-18, 22-11, 14-16, 23-9
Pts: Vaulet 24; Rebs: Vaulet 17; Asts: Corvalan 5		Pts: Rojas 18; Rebs: Rojas 15; Asts: Sarni 3

Resistencia (ARG)

=== Group B ===
Pos	Team	Pld	W	L	PF	PA	PD	Pts	Qualification
1	Brazil	4	4	0	330	258	+72	8	Advance to Semifinals
2	Paraguay	4	3	1	312	284	+28	7	Advance to Semifinals
3	Venezuela	4	2	2	273	280	−7	6	Classification 5-8
4	Colombia	4	1	3	313	350	−37	5	Classification 5-8
5	Peru	4	0	4	266	322	−56	4	

Source: fiba.com

13 September 2015
18:00

Boxscore

Peru	70–84	Colombia
Scoring by quarter: 29-17, 4-31, 16-23, 21-13
Pts: Venegas 24; Rebs: Meyer-Kayser, Pichling 5 Asts: Quieros 3		Pts: Roque 19; Rebs: Valera 9 Asts: Armenteros 4

Sáenz Peña (ARG)

13 September 2015
21:00

Boxscore

Venezuela	46–66	Paraguay
Scoring by quarter: 13-15, 9-21, 14-16, 10-14
Pts: Acosta 8 Rebs: Pino 15; Asts: Lenuz 2		Pts: Poisson 15; Rebs: Poisson 13; Asts: Franco 4

Sáenz Peña (ARG)

14 September 2015
18:45

Boxscore

Venezuela	68–57	Peru
Scoring by quarter: 17-9, 13-15, 20-19, 18-14
Pts: Acosta 16; Rebs: Pino, Mendoza 10; Asts: Lenuz 4		Pts: Venegas 18; Rebs: Venegas, Quieros 7 Asts: Quieros 4

Sáenz Peña (ARG)

14 September 2015
21:00

Boxscore

Paraguay	55–83	Brazil
Scoring by quarter: 12-19, 4-18, 18-25, 21-21
Pts: Poisson 16; Rebs: Poisson 15; Asts: 4 players 1		Pts: Santos, Uchendu 13; Rebs: Goncalves 11; Asts: Ruivo 4

Sáenz Peña (ARG)

15 September 2015
18:45

Boxscore

Brazil	80–67	Peru
Scoring by quarter: 17-19, 20-19, 13-14, 30-15
Pts: Monteiro 18; Rebs: Uchendu 11; Asts: Santos 4		Pts: Venegas 18; Rebs: 3 players 4 Asts: Venegas 3

Sáenz Peña (ARG)

15 September 2015
21:00

Boxscore

Colombia	77–92	Venezuela
Scoring by quarter: 18-17, 27-24, 12-21, 20-30
Pts: Roque 18; Rebs: De Luque 8 Asts: 4 players 2		Pts: Hernandez 21; Rebs: Perez 9 Asts: Acosta 5

Sáenz Peña (ARG)

16 September 2015
18:45

Boxscore

Paraguay	101–83	Colombia
Scoring by quarter: 24-20, 28-20, 21-21, 28-22
Pts: Gonzalez 25; Rebs: Poisson 17; Asts: Martinez 8		Pts: De Luque 19; Rebs: 3 players 8 Asts: Roque 4

Sáenz Peña (ARG)

16 September 2015
21:00

Boxscore

Venezuela	67–80	Brazil
Scoring by quarter: 14-11, 15-21, 18-19, 20-29
Pts: Llamos 18; Rebs: Mendoza 11; Asts: Acosta 2		Pts: Santos 24; Rebs: Pereira 12; Asts: Ruivo 3

Sáenz Peña (ARG)

17 September 2015
15:30

Boxscore

Paraguay	90–72	Peru
Scoring by quarter: 20-8, 19-13, 18-28, 33-23
Pts: Martinez 25; Rebs: Poisson 16; Asts: Martinez, Gonzalez 3		Pts: Venegas 35; Rebs: Meyer-Kayser 5 Asts: Venegas 3

Sáenz Peña (ARG)

17 September 2015
17:45

Boxscore

Brazil	87–69	Colombia
Scoring by quarter: 18-6, 18-20, 24-18, 27-25
Pts: Ferreira 23; Rebs: Uchendu 15; Asts: Pimenta 3		Pts: Roque 26; Rebs: Roque 10; Asts: Roque, Reid 5

Sáenz Peña (ARG)

== Final round ==
=== Classification 5-8 ===
18 September 2015
NONE

Uruguay	20–0	Colombia

Resistencia (ARG)

18 September 2015
18:00

Boxscore

Venezuela	91–62	Ecuador
Scoring by quarter: 18-16, 18-17, 32-16, 23-13
Pts: Bracho 26; Rebs: Perez 16; Asts: Bracho 6		Pts: Bedoya 13; Rebs: Cardenas 14; Asts: Cardenas 3

Resistencia (ARG)

=== Semifinals ===
18 September 2015
20:15

Boxscore

Brazil	59–55	Chile
Scoring by quarter: 8-15, 15-17, 18-13, 18-10
Pts: Monteiro 16; Rebs: Pereira 12; Asts: Ruivo 3		Pts: Aguirre 16; Rebs: Soulodre 12; Asts: Arroyo 5

Resistencia (ARG)

18 September 2015
NONE

Argentina	20–0	Paraguay

Resistencia (ARG)

== Final classification games ==
=== Seventh place game ===
19 September 2015
14:00

Boxscore

Colombia	72–63	Ecuador
Scoring by quarter: 13-12, 13-14, 23-20, 23-17
Pts: Roque 27; Rebs: De Luque 15; Asts: Reid 5		Pts: Bedoya 17; Rebs: Cardenas 13; Asts: Infante 6

Resistencia (ARG)

=== Fifth place game ===
19 September 2015
16:15

Boxscore

Uruguay	70–74 (OT)	Venezuela
Scoring by quarter: 18-13, 10-15, 20-20, 16-16, Overtime: 6-10
Pts: Borrallo, Rojas 15; Rebs: Rojas 10; Asts: 3 players 2		Pts: Llamos, Bracho 17; Rebs: Mendoza 13; Asts: Bracho, Acosta 4

Resistencia (ARG)

=== Third place game ===
19 September 2015
18:30

Boxscore

Chile	69–56	Paraguay
Scoring by quarter: 16-11, 10-10, 16-21, 27-14
Pts: Aguirre 24; Rebs: Haase 17; Asts: Talmar 4		Pts: Martinez 16; Rebs: Poisson 17; Asts: Poisson 2

Resistencia (ARG)

=== Final ===
19 September 2015
21:00

Boxscore

Brazil	49–73	Argentina
Scoring by quarter: 11-18, 11-25, 20-19, 7-11
Pts: Monteiro 11; Rebs: Pereira 11; Asts: Ruivo 3		Pts: Vaulet 18; Rebs: Vaulet 10; Asts: Vaulet 5

Resistencia (ARG)

== Final standings ==
Qualified for the 2016 FIBA Americas Under-18 Championship.

Rank	Team
1st place, gold medalist(s)	Argentina
2nd place, silver medalist(s)	Brazil
3rd place, bronze medalist(s)	Chile
4	Paraguay
5	Venezuela
6	Paraguay
7	Colombia
8	Ecuador
9	Peru
