= Peru men's national under-17 basketball team =

Peru
- FIBA zone: FIBA Americas
- National federation: Peru Basketball Federation

U19 World Cup
- Appearances: None

U18 AmeriCup
- Appearances: None

U17 South American Championship
- Appearances: 16
- Medals: None

The Peru men's national under-17 basketball team is a national basketball team of Peru, administered by the Peru Basketball Federation (Spanish: Federación Deportiva Peruana de Basketball) (F.D.P.B.). It represents the country in international under-17 basketball competitions.

== FIBA South America Under-17 Championship for Men participations ==
Year	Result
1955	7th
1972	6th
1973	5th
1975	6th
1977	9th
1982	7th
1984	7th
1986	6th

Year	Result
1990	5th
1996	8th
2000	8th
2005	6th
2007	5th
2013	7th
2015	9th
2017	8th

== See also ==
- Peru men's national basketball team
- Peru men's national under-15 basketball team
- Peru women's national under-17 basketball team
