= Paraguay men's national under-17 basketball team =

Paraguay
- FIBA zone: FIBA Americas
- National federation: Confederación Paraguaya de Basquetbol

U19 World Cup
- Appearances: None

U18 AmeriCup
- Appearances: None

U17 South American Championship
- Appearances: 18
- Medals: None

The Paraguay men's national under-17 basketball team is a national basketball team of Paraguay, administered by the Paraguayan Basketball Confederation. It represents the country in international under-17 men's basketball competitions.

== FIBA South America Under-17 Championship for Men participations ==
Year	Result
1973	7th
1975	8th
1977	7th
1979	4th
1981	5th
1982	5th
1988	4th
1996	7th
1998	4th

Year	Result
2000	7th
2005	5th
2009	8th
2011	8th
2013	8th
2015	4th
2017	5th
2023	8th
2025	5th

== See also ==
- Paraguay men's national basketball team
- Paraguay men's national under-15 and under-16 basketball team
- Paraguay women's national under-17 basketball team
