= Bolivia men's national under-17 basketball team =

Bolivia
- FIBA zone: FIBA Americas
- National federation: Federación Boliviana de Básquetbol

U19 World Cup
- Appearances: None

U18 AmeriCup
- Appearances: None

U17 South American Championship
- Appearances: 13
- Medals: None

The Bolivia men's national under-17 basketball team is a national basketball team of Bolivia, administered by the Federación Boliviana de Básquetbol (FBB). It represents the country in international men's under-17 basketball competitions.

== FIBA South America Under-17 Championship for Men participations ==
Year	Result
1972	7th
1973	8th
1975	7th
1990	8th
1992	5th
1994	7th
1998	7th

Year	Result
2000	10th
2005	7th
2009	9th
2013	9th
2017	9th
2022	8th

== See also ==
- Bolivia men's national basketball team
- Bolivia men's national under-15 basketball team
- Bolivia women's national under-17 basketball team
