= Mathias Vazquez =

Brazilian basketball player (born 2008)

Real Betis Baloncesto B
- Position: Forward
- League: Tercera FEB

Personal information
- Born: 26 March 2008 (age 18) Brazil
- Listed height: 6 ft 8 in (2.03 m)

Career history
- 2023–: Real Betis Baloncesto B
Medals
Men's basketball
Representing Brazil
South American Under-15 Championship
Gold medal – first place	2022 Argentina	Team

Mathias Alessanco Vazquez dos Santos (born 26 March 2008) is a Brazilian professional basketball player for Real Betis Baloncesto B of the Tercera FEB, as well as the Brazil national team. He is considered one of the top international prospects for the 2027 NBA draft.

Vazquez made his first appearance for the Brazil senior national team in 2024 at the age of 16, becoming the nation's youngest debutant ever.

== Youth career ==
Vazquez grew up watching his father's basketball games with his mother and brother, and thus began playing the sport at a young age. By the age of 11, he was 1.75 m (5 ft 9 in) tall. Vazquez was developed in the youth academies of Bauru, Minas, and S.C. Corinthians Paulista. In May 2022, he was invited to a Jr. NBA Elite Camp held in São Paulo.

Vazquez moved to Spain for the 2022–23 season, joining the Real Betis youth setup. In 2023, he led the Real Betis cadete (under-16) team to an appearance in the Andalusian provincial final, where they lost to Málaga. In 2024, Vazquez helped the cadete team to an Andalusian championship title and a third-place finish at the Spanish National Championship. He also played for the junior (under-18) team, which placed second at the Andalusian championships. In 2025, Vazquez led the junior team to an Andalusian provincial title, scoring 32 points in a 98–93 win over Coria in the final.

At the European level, Vazquez helped the U18 Next Gen Team Munich win the 2024–25 Adidas NextGen EuroLeague Munich tournament, recording 19 points and six rebounds in a 100–88 win over Valencia in the first-place game. He earned all-tournament honors after averaging 9.2 points, 4.2 rebounds, 1.8 assists, and 1.2 blocks per game. Later that year, Vazquez played for Team Next Gen at the Adidas Eurocamp in Treviso, Italy, where he averaged 11 points and 3.7 rebounds per game on 75 percent shooting from the field, drawing praise for his efficiency. Still just 17 years old, he one of the youngest participants at the event and was given a Rising Star award along with Bruce Branch III. Soon afterwards, Vazquez attended the NBPA Top 100 Camp in Rock Hill, South Carolina. He was just the second South American player ever invited to the event, following Leandro Bolmaro.

== Professional career ==
In 2023–24, Vazquez made his debut for the Real Betis reserves in the fourth-tier Liga EBA. He averaged 9.3 points, 5.1 rebounds, and 1.2 assists in 23 games played that season. In 2024–25, Vazquez averaged 17.7 points, eight rebounds, and 3.8 assists in 20 games in the renamed Tercera FEB. He also began training with the Real Betis first team under head coach Gonzalo García de Vitoria. However, Vazquez was unable to debut with the first team due to passport issues.

Vazquez is considered one of the top international prospects for the 2026 NBA draft.

== National team career ==
=== Junior national team ===
Vazquez represented the Brazil national under-15 team at the 2022 FIBA U15 South American Championship in Buenos Aires, Argentina. He averaged 1.3 points, 2.3 rebounds, and 2.3 assists per game as Brazil beat hosts Argentina in the final to capture the gold medal. The following year, Vazquez played for the national under-16 team at the 2023 FIBA Under-16 Americas Championship in Mexico, where he averaged 6.2 points, 5.5 rebounds, and 2.3 assists per game. He next played for the national under-18 team at the 2024 FIBA Under-18 AmeriCup in Argentina, where he averaged a team-high 12 points per game and ranked second in both rebounds (5.2) and assists (2.8) per game. Vazquez tallied a team-high 20 points and seven rebounds in a 71–57 win over Puerto Rico in the classification round.

=== Senior national team ===
In June 2024, Vazquez was invited to attend the Brazil senior national team training camp in Blumenau ahead of their FIBA Olympic Qualifying Tournament. National team head coach Aleksandar Petrović called him a "pleasant surprise" and "the future". That October, Vazquez was named to the final 13-man roster for a pair of 2025 FIBA AmeriCup qualifiers against Uruguay and Panama. He made his senior international debut on 24 November 2024, recording two points, three rebounds, and a steal in 14 minutes in a 93–67 win over Panama. At 16 years old, Vazquez became the youngest player to ever appear for the Brazil senior national team. In January 2025, he earned another call-up for the final window of 2025 FIBA AmeriCup qualification.

== Personal life ==
Vazquez's father, Shilton, was a three-time NBB champion and the league's third all-time leading rebounder, while his mother, Geórgia, was a volleyball player.
