= Ecuador men's national under-17 and under-18 basketball team =

Ecuador
- FIBA zone: FIBA Americas
- National federation: Federación Ecuatoriana de Básquetbol

U19 World Cup
- Appearances: None

U18 AmeriCup
- Appearances: 2
- Medals: None

U17 South American Championship
- Appearances: 17
- Medals: (bronze) Bronze: 2 (2017, 2022)

The Ecuador men's national under-17 and under-18 basketball team is a national basketball team of Ecuador, administered by the Federación Ecuatoriana de Básquetbol. It represents the country in international under-17 and under-18 men's basketball competitions.

== FIBA South America Under-17 Championship for Men participations ==
| Year | Result |
|---|---|
| 1955 | 8th |
| 1977 | 4th |
| 1990 | 6th |
| 1992 | 4th |
| 1994 | 8th |
| 1996 | 9th |
| 2000 | 9th |
| 2007 | 8th |
| 2009 | 6th |

| Year | Result |
|---|---|
| 2011 | 7th |
| 2013 | 6th |
| 2015 | 8th |
| 2017 | 3rd place, bronze medalist(s) |
| 2019 | 4th |
| 2022 | 3rd place, bronze medalist(s) |
| 2023 | 7th |
| 2025 | 7th |

== FIBA Under-18 AmeriCup participations ==
| Year | Result |
|---|---|
| 2018 | 8th |
| 2022 | 8th |

== See also ==
- Ecuador men's national basketball team
- Ecuador men's national under-15 basketball team
- Ecuador women's national under-17 and under-18 basketball team
