= Argentina men's national under-19 basketball team =

Argentina
- Joined FIBA: 1932
- FIBA zone: FIBA Americas
- National federation: Confederación Argentina de Basquetbol
- Coach: Enrique Tolcachier

U19 World Cup
- Appearances: 16
- Medals: (bronze) Bronze: 2 (1979, 1991)

U18 AmeriCup
- Appearances: 14
- Medals: (gold) Gold: 1 (2008); (silver) Silver: 5 (1990, 1994, 1998, 2006, 2024); (bronze) Bronze: 1 (2018)

U17 South American Championship
- Appearances: 28
- Medals: (gold) Gold: 15 (1955, 1972, 1973, 1981, 1988, 1990, 1994, 1996, 2000, 2005, 2007, 2009, 2013, 2015, 2023); (silver) Silver: 12 (1975, 1977, 1979, 1982, 1986, 1992, 1998, 2011, 2017, 2019, 2022, 2025); (bronze) Bronze: 1 (1984)
Home	Away

The Argentina men's national under-17, under-18 and under-19 basketball team is a national basketball team of Argentina, administered by the Argentine Basketball Confederation. It represents the country in men's international under-17, under-18 and under-19 basketball competitions.

== Tournament record ==
=== FIBA Under-19 Basketball World Cup ===
Year	Position	Pld	W	L
(Brazil) 1979	3rd	8	6	2
(Spain) 1983	7th	9	4	5
(Italy) 1987	Did not qualify			
(Canada) 1991	3rd	8	5	3
(Greece) 1995	6th	8	3	5
(Portugal) 1999	4th	8	3	5
(Greece) 2003	10th	8	5	3
(Serbia) 2007	6th	9	4	5
(New Zealand) 2009	5th	9	5	4
(Latvia) 2011	4th	9	5	4
(Czech Republic) 2013	12th	8	1	7
(Greece) 2015	10th	7	2	5
(Egypt) 2017	8th	7	3	4
(Greece) 2019	11th	7	5	2
(Latvia) 2021	8th	7	3	4
(Hungary) 2023	5th	7	4	3
(Switzerland) 2025	12th	7	3	4
(Czech Republic) 2027	Did not qualify			
(Indonesia) 2029	To be determined			
Total	16/19	126	61	65

=== FIBA Under-18 AmeriCup ===
Year	Result
1990	2nd place, silver medalist(s)
1994	2nd place, silver medalist(s)
1998	2nd place, silver medalist(s)
2002	4th
2006	2nd place, silver medalist(s)
2008	1st place, gold medalist(s)
2010	4th

Year	Result
2012	4th
2014	4th
2016	5th
2018	3rd place, bronze medalist(s)
2022	4th
2024	2nd place, silver medalist(s)
2026	5th

=== FIBA Under-17 South American Championship ===
Year	Result
1955	1st place, gold medalist(s)
1972	1st place, gold medalist(s)
1973	1st place, gold medalist(s)
1975	2nd place, silver medalist(s)
1977	2nd place, silver medalist(s)
1979	2nd place, silver medalist(s)
1981	1st place, gold medalist(s)
1982	2nd place, silver medalist(s)
1984	3rd place, bronze medalist(s)
1986	2nd place, silver medalist(s)
1988	1st place, gold medalist(s)
1990	1st place, gold medalist(s)
1992	2nd place, silver medalist(s)
1994	1st place, gold medalist(s)

Year	Result
1996	1st place, gold medalist(s)
1998	2nd place, silver medalist(s)
2000	1st place, gold medalist(s)
2005	1st place, gold medalist(s)
2007	1st place, gold medalist(s)
2009	1st place, gold medalist(s)
2011	2nd place, silver medalist(s)
2013	1st place, gold medalist(s)
2015	1st place, gold medalist(s)
2017	2nd place, silver medalist(s)
2019	2nd place, silver medalist(s)
2022	2nd place, silver medalist(s)
2023	1st place, gold medalist(s)
2025	2nd place, silver medalist(s)

== See also ==
- Argentina men's national basketball team
- Argentina men's national under-17 basketball team
- Argentina women's national under-19 basketball team
