= Chile men's national under-17 and under-18 basketball team =

Chile
- FIBA zone: FIBA Americas
- National federation: Federación de Basquetbol de Chile

U19 World Cup
- Appearances: None

U18 AmeriCup
- Appearances: 2
- Medals: None

U17 South American Championship
- Appearances: 25
- Medals: (gold) Gold: 1 (2017); (bronze) Bronze: 1 (2015)

The Chile men's national under-17 and under-18 basketball team is a national basketball team of Chile, administered by the Federación de Basquetbol de Chile. It represents the country in international under-17 and under-18 men's basketball competitions.

A prominent former member has been Nico Carvacho, who later joined Colorado State Rams men's basketball program as well as Chile's senior national basketball team.

== FIBA South America Under-17 Championship for Men participations ==
Year	Result
1955	4th
1972	4th
1973	6th
1975	4th
1977	8th
1979	5th
1981	6th
1982	8th
1984	6th
1986	5th
1988	7th
1990	7th
1994	6th

Year	Result
1996	5th
1998	8th
2000	6th
2007	6th
2009	7th
2011	6th
2015	3rd place, bronze medalist(s)
2017	1st place, gold medalist(s)
2019	6th
2022	7th
2023	4th
2025	6th

== FIBA Under-18 AmeriCup participations ==
Year	Result
2016	6th
2018	5th

== See also ==
- Chile men's national basketball team
- Chile men's national under-15 and under-16 basketball team
- Chile women's national under-19 basketball team
