= 2025 FIBA U17 South American Championship =

International youth basketball tournament

28th FIBA Under-17 Men's South American Basketball Championship

Tournament details
- Host country: Paraguay
- City: Asunción
- Dates: 10–14 December 2025
- Teams: 8 (from 1 sub-confederation)
- Venue: 1 (in 1 host city)

Final positions
- Champions: Brazil (11th title)
- Runners-up: Argentina
- Third place: Venezuela

Official website
- www.fiba.basketball

The 2025 FIBA U17 South American Championship was the 28th edition of the South American basketball championship for under-17 men's national teams. The tournament was played at the SND Arena in Asunción, Paraguay, from 10 to 14 December 2025.

This tournament also served as a qualification for the 2026 FIBA U18 AmeriCup, where the top three teams qualified.

== Participating teams ==
- Argentina
- Brazil
- Chile
- Colombia
- Ecuador
- Paraguay
- Uruguay
- Venezuela

== First round ==
In the first round, the teams were drawn into two groups of four. The first two teams from each group advanced to the semifinals; the third- and fourth-placed teams advanced to the 5th–8th place playoffs.

All times are local (Paraguay Time; UTC-3).

=== Group A ===
Pos	Team	Pld	W	L	PF	PA	PD	Pts	Qualification
1	Argentina	3	3	0	297	170	+127	6	Semifinals
2	Uruguay	3	2	1	222	212	+10	5	Semifinals
3	Colombia	3	1	2	209	209	0	4	5th–8th place playoffs
4	Ecuador	3	0	3	149	286	−137	3	5th–8th place playoffs

Source: FIBA

10 December 2025
12:30

Boxscore

Ecuador	48–79	Colombia
Scoring by quarter: 16–9, 10–24, 12–19, 10–27

UENO COP Arena, Asunción

10 December 2025
15:00

Boxscore

Uruguay	58–93	Argentina
Scoring by quarter: 16–21, 18–19, 10–22, 14–31

UENO COP Arena, Asunción

11 December 2025
12:30

Boxscore

Colombia	61–83	Uruguay
Scoring by quarter: 18–25, 14–17, 12–20, 17–21

UENO COP Arena, Asunción

11 December 2025
15:00

Boxscore

Argentina	126–43	Ecuador
Scoring by quarter: 29–16, 42–17, 27–5, 28–5

UENO COP Arena, Asunción

12 December 2025
12:30

Boxscore

Uruguay	81–58	Ecuador
Scoring by quarter: 21–8, 21–13, 17–17, 22–20

UENO COP Arena, Asunción

12 December 2025
15:00

Boxscore

Colombia	69–78	Argentina
Scoring by quarter: 17–20, 13–13, 17–22, 22–23

UENO COP Arena, Asunción

=== Group B ===
Pos	Team	Pld	W	L	PF	PA	PD	Pts	Qualification
1	Brazil	3	3	0	310	196	+114	6	Semifinals
2	Venezuela	3	1	2	220	225	−5	4	Semifinals
3	Chile	3	1	2	229	252	−23	4	5th–8th place playoffs
4	Paraguay (H)	3	1	2	184	270	−86	4	5th–8th place playoffs

Source: FIBA
(H) Hosts

10 December 2025
17:30

Boxscore

Brazil	99–70	Chile
Scoring by quarter: 26–21, 19–14, 29–18, 25–17

UENO COP Arena, Asunción

10 December 2025
20:00

Boxscore

Paraguay	67–58	Venezuela
Scoring by quarter: 23–22, 13–8, 16–17, 15–11

UENO COP Arena, Asunción

11 December 2025
17:30

Boxscore

Venezuela	79–94	Brazil
Scoring by quarter: 23–25, 18–23, 16–18, 22–28

UENO COP Arena, Asunción

11 December 2025
20:00

Boxscore

Chile	95–70	Paraguay
Scoring by quarter: 15–23, 36–16, 19–17, 25–14

UENO COP Arena, Asunción

12 December 2025
17:30

Boxscore

Chile	64–83	Venezuela
Scoring by quarter: 14–18, 10–26, 16–22, 24–17

UENO COP Arena, Asunción

12 December 2025
20:00

Boxscore

Paraguay	47–117	Brazil
Scoring by quarter: 8–38, 10–26, 15–28, 14–25

UENO COP Arena, Asunción

== 5th–8th place playoffs ==
5th–8th place semifinals
A3	Colombia	66
B4	Paraguay	71
B3	Chile	72
A4	Ecuador	61

5th place match
B4	Paraguay	76
B3	Chile	74
7th place match
A3	Colombia	62
A4	Ecuador	71

=== 5th–8th place semifinals ===
13 December 2025
12:30

Boxscore

Chile	72–61	Ecuador
Scoring by quarter: 22–10, 25–8, 12–20, 13–23

UENO COP Arena, Asunción

13 December 2025
15:00

Boxscore

Colombia	66–71	Paraguay
Scoring by quarter: 19–12, 16–19, 14–17, 17–23

UENO COP Arena, Asunción

=== 7th place match ===
14 December 2025
12:30

Boxscore

Colombia	62–71	Ecuador
Scoring by quarter: 10–25, 22–18, 11–16, 19–12

UENO COP Arena, Asunción

=== 5th place match ===
14 December 2025
15:00

Boxscore

Paraguay	76–74	Chile
Scoring by quarter: 19–11, 20–20, 22–28, 15–15

UENO COP Arena, Asunción

== Championship playoffs ==
Semifinals
A1	Argentina	66
B2	Venezuela	45
B1	Brazil	106
A2	Uruguay	52

Final
A1	Argentina	77
B1	Brazil	98
3rd place match
B2	Venezuela	85
A2	Uruguay	68

=== Semifinals ===
13 December 2025
17:30

Boxscore

Argentina	66–45	Venezuela
Scoring by quarter: 18–10, 13–14, 19–14, 16–7

UENO COP Arena, Asunción

13 December 2025
20:00

Boxscore

Brazil	106–52	Uruguay
Scoring by quarter: 23–18, 25–8, 28–14, 30–12

UENO COP Arena, Asunción

=== 3rd place match ===
14 December 2025
17:30

Boxscore

Venezuela	85–68	Uruguay
Scoring by quarter: 27–21, 22–18, 10–15, 26–14

UENO COP Arena, Asunción

=== Final ===
14 December 2025
20:00

Boxscore

Argentina	77–98	Brazil
Scoring by quarter: 17–25, 14–26, 20–19, 26–28

UENO COP Arena, Asunción

== Final standings ==
Rank	Team
1st place, gold medalist(s)	Brazil
2nd place, silver medalist(s)	Argentina
3rd place, bronze medalist(s)	Venezuela
4	Uruguay
5	Paraguay
6	Chile
7	Ecuador
8	Colombia

Qualified for the 2026 FIBA U18 AmeriCup
