= 1990 ABC Under-18 Championship =

1990 FIBA U18 Asia Cup
11th FIBA Under-18 Asian Basketball Championship

Tournament details
- Host country: Japan
- Dates: 25 August–2 September
- Teams: 16 (from 36 federations)
- Venue: 1 (in 1 host city)

Final positions
- Champions: Japan (1st title)

The 1990 ABC Under-18 Championship was the eleventh edition of the Asian Championship for Junior Men. The tournament took place in Nagoya, Japan from August to 2 September 1990. Top three teams from this competition were qualified for the World Junior Basketball Championship held in Edmonton, Canada from July 26 to August 4 of 1991.

Japan won their first-ever championship after breezing past Syria in the championship match, 82-63. Defending champions China, edged out the Philippines, 96-93 in the battle for third place.

The top three teams represented Asia to the 1991 FIBA Under-19 World Championship.

== Preliminary round ==
Top two teams from each group advance to the final round.

=== Draw ===
- Group A: China, Malaysia, India, Kuwait
- Group B: Taiwan, Indonesia, Sri Lanka, Japan
- Group C: Philippines, Iran, Hong Kong
- Group D: South Korea, Saudi Arabia, Syria

=== Group D ===
26 August 1990

Saudi Arabia	83–79	South Korea
Scoring by half: 49-44, 34-35

Nagoya Civic General Gymnasium, Nagoya

2? August 1990

Syria	vs.	Saudi Arabia

Nagoya Civic General Gymnasium, Nagoya

27 August 1990

Syria	102–100	South Korea
Scoring by half: 51-50, 51-50

Nagoya Civic General Gymnasium, Nagoya

== Championship round ==
30 August 1990

China	100–71	Philippines

Nagoya Civic General Gymnasium, Nagoya

30 August 1990

Japan	70–61	Syria

Nagoya Civic General Gymnasium, Nagoya

== Classification round ==
=== 9th-12th place match ===
31 August 1990

South Korea	128–73	Indonesia
Scoring by half: 52-34, 76-39

Nagoya Civic General Gymnasium, Nagoya

== Final round ==
Semifinals
1 September
Philippines	76
Japan	78
1 September
China	60
Syria	61

Final
2 September
Japan	82
Syria	63
3rd place
2 September
Philippines	93
China	96

=== Semifinals ===
1 September

Report

Philippines	76–78	Japan
Scoring by half: –, –
Pts: Limpot 22		Pts: Sekiguchi 30

Nagoya Sports Center, Nagoya
Referees: Estabros Doubis (GRE), Hamid Kian-ersi (IRI)

1 September

Report

China	60–61	Syria
Scoring by half: –, –

Nagoya Sports Center, Nagoya

=== 9th place ===
2 September

Report

South Korea	119–54	Iran
Scoring by half: 62–30, 57–24

Nagoya Sports Center, Nagoya

=== 3rd place ===
2 September

Report

Philippines	93–96	China
Scoring by half: 47–53, 46–43
Pts: Limpot 26		Pts: Liu 35

Nagoya Sports Center, Nagoya

=== Final ===
2 September

Report

Japan	82–63	Syria
Scoring by half: –, –

Nagoya Sports Center, Nagoya

== Final standing ==
Qualified for the 1991 FIBA Under-19 World Championship

Rank	Team	Record
1st place, gold medalist(s)	Japan	–
2nd place, silver medalist(s)	Syria	–
3rd place, bronze medalist(s)	China	–
4	Philippines	–
5	Saudi Arabia	–
6	Malaysia	–
7	Chinese Taipei	–
8	Hong Kong	–
9	South Korea	–
10	Iran	–
11	India	–
12	Indonesia	–
13	Sri Lanka	–

== Awards ==
1990 Asian Under-18 champions

Japan
First title

== See also ==
- 1990 ABC Under-18 Championship for Women
