= Colombia men's national under-17 and under-18 basketball team =

Colombia
- FIBA zone: FIBA Americas
- National federation: Federación Colombiana de Baloncesto

U19 World Cup
- Appearances: None

U18 AmeriCup
- Appearances: 1
- Medals: None

U17 South American Championship
- Appearances: 20
- Medals: (bronze) Bronze: 1 (2011)

The Colombia men's national under-17 and under-18 basketball team is a national basketball team of Colombia, administered by the Federación Colombiana de Baloncesto. It represents the country in international under-17 and under-18 men's basketball competitions.

== FIBA South America Under-17 Championship for Men participations ==
Year	Result
1955	6th
1972	8th
1977	6th
1982	6th
1984	5th
1986	7th
1988	6th
1994	5th
1996	6th
1998	5th

Year	Result
2000	5th
2007	7th
2009	5th
2011	3rd place, bronze medalist(s)
2013	4th
2015	7th
2017	4th
2022	6th
2023	6th
2025	8th

== FIBA Under-18 AmeriCup participations ==
Year	Result
2012	8th

== See also ==
- Colombia men's national basketball team
- Colombia men's national under-15 basketball team
- Colombia women's national under-17 basketball team
