= 2027 FIBA Under-19 Basketball World Cup =

Mistrovství světa v basketbalu hráčů do 19 let 2027

Tournament details
- Host country: Czech Republic
- City: Pardubice
- Dates: 26 June – 4 July 2027
- Teams: 16 (from 4 confederations)

Official website
- FIBA

The 2027 FIBA Under-19 Basketball World Cup will be the 18th edition of the FIBA Under-19 Basketball World Cup, the biennial international men's youth basketball championship contested by the U19 national teams of the member associations of FIBA. The tournament will be held in Pardubice, Czech Republic, from 26 June to 4 July 2027.

== Qualified teams ==
Means of qualification	Dates	Venue	Berth(s)	Qualifier(s)
Host nation	—N/a	—N/a	1	Czech Republic
2026 FIBA U18 AmeriCup	1–7 June 2026	(Mexico) León	4	Canada; United States; Brazil; Puerto Rico
2026 FIBA U18 EuroBasket	25 July – 2 August 2026	(Italy) Trentino	5	France; Italy; Slovenia; Spain; Germany
2026 FIBA U18 AfroBasket	5–16 August 2026	(Ivory Coast) Abidjan	2	Ivory Coast; Senegal
2026 FIBA U18 Asia Cup	13–23 August 2026	(India) Ahmedabad	4	Australia; China; New Zealand; South Korea
Total			16	

=== Summary of qualified teams ===
Team	Qualification method	Date of qualification	Appearance(s)				Previous best performance (Note: Bold text indicates they hosted that edition.)	WR (Note: World ranking at start of tournament.)
Team	Qualification method	Date of qualification	Total	First	Last	Streak	Previous best performance	WR
Czech Republic	Host nation	30 November 2022	2nd	2013		1	Thirteenth place (2013)	TBD
Canada	Top four at 2026 FIBA U18 AmeriCup	4 June 2026	15th	1979	2025	11	Champions (2017)	TBD
United States	Top four at 2026 FIBA U18 AmeriCup	4 June 2026	18th	1979	2025	18	Champions (1979, 1983, 1991, 2009, 2013, 2015, 2019, 2021, 2025)	TBD
Brazil	Top four at 2026 FIBA U18 AmeriCup	4 June 2026	10th	1979	2023	1	Third place (1983)	TBD
Puerto Rico	Top four at 2026 FIBA U18 AmeriCup	4 June 2026	9th	1987	2021	1	Thirteenth place (2013)	TBD
Slovenia	Top five at 2026 FIBA U18 EuroBasket	30 July 2026	4th	2003	2025	3	Third place (2025)	TBD
Spain	Top five at 2026 FIBA U18 EuroBasket	30 July 2026	12th	1983	2023	1	Champions (1999, 2023)	TBD
Italy	Top five at 2026 FIBA U18 EuroBasket	30 July 2026	8th	1979	2017	1	Runners-up (1991, 2017)	TBD
France	Top five at 2026 FIBA U18 EuroBasket	30 July 2026	9th	1995	2025	6	Runners-up (2021, 2023)	TBD
Germany	Top five at 2026 FIBA U18 EuroBasket	2 August 2026	5th	1983	2025	2	Runners-up (2025)	TBD
Senegal	Top two at 2026 FIBA U18 AfroBasket	15 August 2026	4th	2013	2021	1	Seventh place (2021)	TBD
Ivory Coast	Top two at 2026 FIBA U18 AfroBasket	15 August 2026	2nd	2013		1	Fifteenth place (2013)	TBD
China	Top four at 2026 FIBA U18 Asia Cup	21 August 2026	14th	1983	2025	2	Seventh place (2013)	TBD
South Korea	Top four at 2026 FIBA U18 Asia Cup	21 August 2026	10th	1995	2023	1	Eleventh place (2007)	TBD
New Zealand	Top four at 2026 FIBA U18 Asia Cup	21 August 2026	5th	2009	2025	2	Fourth place (2025)	TBD
Australia	Top four at 2026 FIBA U18 Asia Cup	21 August 2026	16th	1979	2025	2	Champions (2003)	TBD
