= 2022 FIBA U18 South American Championship =

International basketball competition

Tournament details
- Host country: Venezuela
- City: Caracas
- Dates: 21–26 March 2022
- Teams: 8 (from 1 confederation)
- Venue: 1 (in 1 host city)

Final positions
- Champions: Brazil (10th title)
- Runners-up: Argentina
- Third place: Ecuador

Official website
- www.fiba.basketball

The 2022 FIBA U18 South American Championship was the 26th edition of the South American basketball championship for under-17/18 men's national teams. The tournament was played in Caracas, Venezuela, from 21 to 26 March 2022. Brazil won the tournament for the 10th time.

The tournament was postponed by one year due to the COVID-19 pandemic. Also, the age category was increased from U17 to U18.

== Participating teams ==
- Argentina
- Bolivia
- Brazil
- Chile
- Colombia
- Ecuador
- Uruguay
- Venezuela

== First round ==
In the first round, the teams were drawn into two groups of four. The first two teams from each group advanced to the semifinals; the third and fourth teams advanced to the 5th–8th place playoffs.

All times are local (Venezuelan Standard Time – UTC-4).

=== Group A ===
| Pos | Team | Pld | W | L | PF | PA | PD | Pts | Qualification |
|---|---|---|---|---|---|---|---|---|---|
| 1 | Brazil | 3 | 3 | 0 | 254 | 116 | +138 | 6 | Semifinals |
| 2 | Uruguay | 3 | 2 | 1 | 201 | 217 | −16 | 5 | Semifinals |
| 3 | Colombia | 3 | 1 | 2 | 199 | 218 | −19 | 4 | 5th–8th place playoffs |
| 4 | Bolivia | 3 | 0 | 3 | 160 | 263 | −103 | 3 | 5th–8th place playoffs |

Source: FIBA

21 March 2022
10:00

Boxscore

| Colombia | 73–81 (OT) | Uruguay |
Scoring by quarter: 12–15, 13–8, 14–22, 30–24, Overtime: 4–12

Parque Miranda, Caracas

21 March 2022
13:00

Boxscore

| Brazil | 99–34 | Bolivia |
Scoring by quarter: 20–7, 24–4, 31–11, 24–12

Parque Miranda, Caracas

22 March 2022
15:00

Boxscore

| Bolivia | 63–87 | Colombia |
Scoring by quarter: 20–19, 20–21, 10–20, 13–27

Parque Miranda, Caracas

22 March 2022
18:00

Boxscore

| Uruguay | 43–81 | Brazil |
Scoring by quarter: 13–25, 4–17, 12–20, 14–19

Parque Miranda, Caracas

24 March 2022
10:00

Boxscore

| Colombia | 39–74 | Brazil |
Scoring by quarter: 9–10, 4–31, 11–21, 15–12

Parque Miranda, Caracas

24 March 2022
13:00

Boxscore

| Bolivia | 63–77 | Uruguay |
Scoring by quarter: 14–21, 16–24, 7–16, 26–16

Parque Miranda, Caracas

=== Group B ===
| Pos | Team | Pld | W | L | PF | PA | PD | Pts | Qualification |
|---|---|---|---|---|---|---|---|---|---|
| 1 | Argentina | 3 | 3 | 0 | 229 | 169 | +60 | 6 | Semifinals |
| 2 | Ecuador | 3 | 1 | 2 | 198 | 194 | +4 | 4 | Semifinals |
| 3 | Venezuela (H) | 3 | 1 | 2 | 180 | 184 | −4 | 4 | 5th–8th place playoffs |
| 4 | Chile | 3 | 1 | 2 | 136 | 196 | −60 | 4 | 5th–8th place playoffs |

Source: FIBA
(H) Hosts

21 March 2022
16:00

Boxscore

| Ecuador | 73–75 | Argentina |
Scoring by quarter: 11–20, 26–10, 16–21, 20–24

Parque Miranda, Caracas

21 March 2022
19:00

Boxscore

| Chile | 47–54 | Venezuela |
Scoring by quarter: 8–10, 12–15, 13–16, 14–13

Parque Miranda, Caracas

23 March 2022
15:00

Boxscore

| Argentina | 95–38 | Chile |
Scoring by quarter: 24–10, 14–5, 34–10, 23–13

Parque Miranda, Caracas

23 March 2022
18:00

Boxscore

| Venezuela | 68–78 | Ecuador |
Scoring by quarter: 22–24, 19–11, 17–17, 10–26

Parque Miranda, Caracas

24 March 2022
16:00

Boxscore

| Ecuador | 47–51 | Chile |
Scoring by quarter: 16–5, 12–11, 14–20, 5–15

Parque Miranda, Caracas

24 March 2022
19:00

Boxscore

| Venezuela | 58–59 | Argentina |
Scoring by quarter: 19–16, 17–11, 7–19, 15–13

Parque Miranda, Caracas

== 5th–8th place playoffs ==
5th–8th place semifinals
A3 | Colombia | 71
B4 | Chile | 52
B3 | Venezuela | 82
A4 | Bolivia | 66

5th place match
A3 | Colombia | 60
B3 | Venezuela | 82
7th place match
B4 | Chile | 70
A4 | Bolivia | 66

=== 5th–8th place semifinals ===
2 March 2022
10:00

Boxscore

| Colombia | 71–52 | Chile |
Scoring by quarter: 19–7, 17–19, 21–10, 14–16

Parque Miranda, Caracas

2 March 2022
13:00

Boxscore

| Venezuela | 82–66 | Bolivia |
Scoring by quarter: 20–21, 23–7, 20–23, 19–15

Parque Miranda, Caracas

=== 7th place match ===
2 March 2022
10:00

Boxscore

| Chile | 70–66 | Bolivia |
Scoring by quarter: 17–7, 20–17, 19–20, 14–22

Parque Miranda, Caracas

=== 5th place match ===
2 March 2022
13:00

Boxscore

| Colombia | 60–82 | Venezuela |
Scoring by quarter: 14–19, 17–22, 6–20, 23–21

Parque Miranda, Caracas

== Championship playoffs ==
Semifinals
A1 | Brazil | 84
B2 | Ecuador | 40
B1 | Argentina | 65
A2 | Uruguay | 42

Final
A1 | Brazil | 73
B1 | Argentina | 59
3rd place match
B2 | Ecuador | 63
A2 | Uruguay | 60

=== Semifinals ===
2 March 2022
16:00

Boxscore

| Brazil | 84–40 | Ecuador |
Scoring by quarter: 18–11, 25–14, 18–11, 23–4

Parque Miranda, Caracas

2 March 2022
19:00

Boxscore

| Argentina | 65–42 | Uruguay |
Scoring by quarter: 16–4, 25–14, 11–12, 13–12

Parque Miranda, Caracas

=== 3rd place match ===
2 March 2022
16:00

Boxscore

| Ecuador | 63–60 | Uruguay |
Scoring by quarter: 12–16, 18–11, 15–16, 18–17

Parque Miranda, Caracas

=== Final ===
2 March 2022
19:00

Boxscore

| Brazil | 73–59 | Argentina |
Scoring by quarter: 13–13, 21–19, 21–12, 18–15

Parque Miranda, Caracas

== Final standings ==
| Rank | Team |
|---|---|
| 1st place, gold medalist(s) | Brazil |
| 2nd place, silver medalist(s) | Argentina |
| 3rd place, bronze medalist(s) | Ecuador |
| 4 | Uruguay |
| 5 | Venezuela |
| 6 | Colombia |
| 7 | Chile |
| 8 | Bolivia |

| Qualified for the 2022 FIBA Under-18 Americas Championship |
