= FIBA U17 South American Championship =

International youth basketball tournament

- Most recent season or competition: 2025 FIBA U17 South American Championship
- Formerly: FIBA South American Championship for Junior Men; FIBA South America Under-17 Championship for Men
- Sport: Basketball
- Founded: 1955
- Organizing body: FIBA Americas
- No. of teams: 10 max.
- Continent: South America
- Most recent champion: Brazil (11th title)
- Most titles: Argentina (15 titles)
- Qualification: FIBA Under-18 AmeriCup
- Related competitions: FIBA U15 South American Championship
- Website: www.fiba.basketball/history

The FIBA U17 South American Championship is a basketball competition held about every two years among the ten countries of South America and is organized in part by FIBA Americas. The tournament serves as a gateway to the FIBA Under-18 AmeriCup. Originally, this competition was played in the under-18 age category, and since 2005 it has been played in the under-17 age category.

== Summaries ==
| Year | Host | Gold | Silver | Bronze |
|---|---|---|---|---|
| 1955 | Colombia (Cúcuta) | Argentina | Brazil | Uruguay |
| 1972 | Chile (Santiago) | Argentina | Brazil | Uruguay |
| 1973 | Argentina (Bahía Blanca) | Argentina | Brazil | Uruguay |
| 1975 | Brazil (Araraquara) | Brazil | Argentina | Uruguay |
| 1977 | Ecuador (Guayaquil) | Brazil | Argentina | Uruguay |
| 1979 | Uruguay (Montevideo) | Brazil | Argentina | Uruguay |
| 1981 | Venezuela (Caracas) | Argentina | Brazil | Uruguay |
| 1982 | Uruguay (Montevideo) | Uruguay | Argentina | Brazil |
| 1984 | Colombia (Pereira) | Brazil | Venezuela | Argentina |
| 1986 | Argentina (Rosario) | Brazil | Argentina | Venezuela |
| 1988 | Argentina (Jujuy) | Argentina | Brazil | Uruguay |
| 1990 | Argentina (Santa Fé) | Argentina | Brazil | Uruguay |
| 1992 | Ecuador (Quito) | Brazil | Argentina | Uruguay |
| 1994 | Bolivia (Oruro) | Argentina | Venezuela | Brazil |
| 1996 | Ecuador (Ibarra) | Argentina | Brazil | Uruguay |
| 1998 | Argentina (Córdoba) | Brazil | Argentina | Venezuela |
| 2000 | Colombia (Cali) | Argentina | Brazil | Venezuela |
| 2005 | Venezuela (Barquisimeto) | Argentina | Uruguay | Brazil |
| 2007 | Venezuela (Guanare) | Argentina | Venezuela | Uruguay |
| 2009 | Uruguay (Trinidad) | Argentina | Uruguay | Brazil |
| 2011 | Colombia (Cúcuta) | Brazil | Argentina | Colombia |
| 2013 | Uruguay (Salto) | Argentina | Uruguay | Brazil |
| 2015 | Argentina (Resistencia) | Argentina | Brazil | Chile |
| 2017 | Peru (Lima) | Chile | Argentina | Ecuador |
| 2019 | Chile (Santiago de Chile) | Brazil | Argentina | Uruguay |
| 2022 | Venezuela (Caracas) | Brazil | Argentina | Ecuador |
| 2023 | Colombia (Valledupar) | Argentina | Venezuela | Brazil |
| 2025 | Paraguay (Asunción) | Brazil | Argentina | Venezuela |

== Medal table ==
| Rank | Nation | Gold | Silver | Bronze | Total |
|---|---|---|---|---|---|
| 1 | Argentina | 15 | 12 | 1 | 28 |
| 2 | Brazil | 11 | 9 | 6 | 26 |
| 3 | Uruguay | 1 | 3 | 13 | 17 |
| 4 | Chile | 1 | 0 | 1 | 2 |
| 5 | Venezuela | 0 | 4 | 4 | 8 |
| 6 | Ecuador | 0 | 0 | 2 | 2 |
| 7 | Colombia | 0 | 0 | 1 | 1 |
| Totals (7 entries) | | 28 | 28 | 28 | 84 |

== Participation details ==
| Team | (Colombia); 1955 | (Chile); 1972 | (Argentina); 1973 | (Brazil); 1975 | (Ecuador); 1977 | (Uruguay); 1979 | (Venezuela); 1981 | (Uruguay); 1982 | (Colombia); 1984 | (Argentina); 1986 | (Argentina); 1988 | (Argentina); 1990 | (Ecuador); 1992 | (Bolivia); 1994 | (Ecuador); 1996 | (Argentina); 1998 | (Colombia); 2000 | (Venezuela); 2005 | (Venezuela); 2007 | (Uruguay); 2009 | (Colombia); 2011 | (Uruguay); 2013 | (Argentina); 2015 | (Peru); 2017 | (Chile); 2019 | (Venezuela); 2022 | (Colombia); 2023 | (Paraguay); 2025 |
| Argentina | 1st | 1st | 1st | 2nd | 2nd | 2nd | 1st | 2nd | 3rd | 2nd | 1st | 1st | 2nd | 1st | 1st | 2nd | 1st | 1st | 1st | 1st | 2nd | 1st | 1st | 2nd | 2nd | 2nd | 1st | 2nd |
| Bolivia | — | 7th | 8th | 7th | — | — | — | — | — | — | — | 8th | 5th | 7th | — | 7th | 10th | 7th | — | 9th | — | 9th | — | 9th | — | 8th | — | — |
| Brazil | 2nd | 2nd | 2nd | 1st | 1st | 1st | 2nd | 3rd | 1st | 1st | 2nd | 2nd | 1st | 3rd | 2nd | 1st | 2nd | 3rd | 4th | 3rd | 1st | 3rd | 2nd | — | 1st | 1st | 3rd | 1st |
| Chile | 4th | 4th | 6th | 4th | 8th | 5th | 6th | 8th | 6th | 5th | 7th | 7th | — | 6th | 5th | 8th | 6th | — | 6th | 7th | 6th | — | 3rd | 1st | 6th | 7th | 4th | 6th |
| Colombia | 6th | 8th | — | — | 6th | — | — | 6th | 5th | 7th | 6th | — | — | 5th | 6th | 5th | 5th | — | 7th | 5th | 3rd | 4th | 7th | 4th | — | 6th | 6th | 8th |
| Ecuador | 8th | — | — | — | 4th | — | — | — | — | — | — | 6th | 4th | 8th | 9th | — | 9th | — | 8th | 6th | 7th | 6th | 8th | 3rd | 4th | 3rd | 7th | 7th |
| Paraguay | — | — | 7th | 8th | 7th | 4th | 5th | 5th | — | — | 4th | — | — | — | 7th | 4th | 7th | 5th | — | 8th | 8th | 8th | 4th | 5th | — | — | 8th | 5th |
| Peru | 7th | 6th | 5th | 6th | 9th | — | — | 7th | 7th | 6th | — | 5th | — | — | 8th | — | 8th | 6th | 5th | — | — | 7th | 9th | 8th | — | — | — | — |
| Uruguay | 3rd | 3rd | 3rd | 3rd | 3rd | 3rd | 3rd | 1st | 4th | 4th | 3rd | 3rd | 3rd | 4th | 3rd | 6th | 4th | 2nd | 3rd | 2nd | 4th | 2nd | 6th | 6th | 3rd | 4th | 5th | 4th |
| Venezuela | 5th | 5th | 4th | 5th | 5th | — | 5th | 5th | 2nd | 3rd | 5th | 4th | — | 2nd | 4th | 3rd | 3rd | 4th | 2nd | 4th | 5th | 5th | 5th | 7th | 5th | 5th | 2nd | 3rd |

== See also ==
- FIBA U15 South American Championship
- FIBA U15 Women's South American Championship
- FIBA U17 Women's South American Championship
- FIBA South America Under-21 Championship for Men (defunct)
