= 2024 FIBA U18 AmeriCup =

13th FIBA Under-18 Americas Basketball Championship

Tournament details
- Host country: Argentina
- City: Buenos Aires
- Dates: 3–9 June
- Teams: 8 (from 1 confederation)
- Venue: 1 (in 1 host city)

Final positions
- Champions: United States (11th title)
- Runners-up: Argentina
- Third place: Canada
- Fourth place: Dominican Republic

Tournament statistics
- MVP: (United States) Darius Acuff Jr.
- Top scorer: (Argentina) Tyler Kropp (22.0)
- Top rebounds: (Argentina) Tyler Kropp (11.3)
- Top assists: (Dominican Republic) Danny Carbuccia (6.0)

Official website
- www.fiba.basketball/history

Another transparent logo version for 2024 FIBA U18 AmeriCup

The 2024 FIBA U18 AmeriCup was the 13th edition of the FIBA Under-18 AmeriCup, a biennial international under-18 men's basketball competition. The tournament was held from 3 to 9 June 2024 in Buenos Aires, Argentina. It also served as the FIBA Americas' qualifiers for the 2025 FIBA Under-19 Basketball World Cup in Switzerland, where the top four team qualified.

== Hosts selection ==
On 9 April 2024, FIBA Americas decided to grant Argentina the hosting rights for the 2024 FIBA U18 AmeriCup. The city of Buenos Aires would host the event, which took place from June 3 to 9.

== Participating teams ==
- North America:
1. United States
2. Canada
- Central America/Caribbean: (2023 FIBA U17 Centrobasket in Belize City, Belize, 26–30 July 2023)
1. Puerto Rico
2. Dominican Republic
3. Belize
- South America: (2023 FIBA U17 South American Championship in Valledupar, Colombia, 16–20 November 2023)
1. Argentina (Hosts)
2. Venezuela
3. Brazil

== Preliminary round ==
The draw was held on 1 May 2024 in FIBA Americas Headquarters in Miami, Florida.

All times are local (Argentina Time; UTC-3).

=== Group A ===
Pos	Team	Pld	W	L	PF	PA	PD	Pts	Qualification
1	Dominican Republic	3	3	0	241	192	+49	6	Advance to Quarterfinals
2	Canada	3	2	1	259	186	+73	5	Advance to Quarterfinals
3	Venezuela	3	1	2	196	257	−61	4	Advance to Quarterfinals
4	Puerto Rico	3	0	3	175	236	−61	3	Advance to Quarterfinals

Source: FIBA
Rules for classification: 1) Points; 2) Head-to-head results; 3) Points difference; 4) Points scored.

3 June 2024
12:40

Boxscore

Venezuela	80–69	Puerto Rico
Scoring by quarter: 23–20, 15–12, 22–21, 20–16
Pts: Jeiminson Marquez 24; Rebs: Jeiminson Marquez 9 Asts: Diego Sulbaran 7		Pts: Alejandro Aviles 17; Rebs: Alejandro Aviles 12; Asts: two players 4

Estadio Obras Sanitarias, Buenos Aires
Referees: Fernando Leite (BRA), Orlando Jose Varela Diaz (HND), Franco Anselmo Krivokapich (ARG)

3 June 2024
15:10

Boxscore

Canada	77–79 (OT)	Dominican Republic
Scoring by quarter: 13–15, 22–15, 18–13, 16–26, Overtime: 8–10
Pts: Tristan Beckford 12; Rebs: Tristan Beckford 10; Asts: three players 5		Pts: Lucas Morillo 19; Rebs: Frank Siaca 9 Asts: Danny Carbuccia 9

Estadio Obras Sanitarias, Buenos Aires
Referees: Alan Dos Santos (BRA), Ryan Johnson (USA), Gastón Rodríguez (URY)

4 June 2024
12:40

Boxscore

Puerto Rico	54–93	Canada
Scoring by quarter: 15–26, 18–33, 15–21, 6–13
Pts: Alejandro Aviles 11; Rebs: Alejandro Aviles 7 Asts: Alejandro Aviles 3		Pts: Matthew Dann 18; Rebs: Olivier Rioux 9 Asts: Torian Lee 7

Estadio Obras Sanitarias, Buenos Aires
Referees: Alan Dos Santos (BRA), Yezid Carreño (COL), Franco Anselmo Krivokapich (ARG)

4 June 2024
15:10

Boxscore

Dominican Republic	99–63	Venezuela
Scoring by quarter: 22–16, 22–21, 29–20, 26–6
Pts: Lucas Morillo 24; Rebs: Fernando De Los Santos 6 Asts: Danny Carbuccia 7		Pts: Jeiminson Marquez 22; Rebs: Estoyan Vargas 7 Asts: Diego Sulbaran 5

Estadio Obras Sanitarias, Buenos Aires
Referees: Fernando Leite (BRA), Ryan Johnson (USA), Juan Fabian Valenzuela Estrada (MEX)

5 June 2024
12:40

Boxscore

Venezuela	53–89	Canada
Scoring by quarter: 17–23, 10–28, 9–23, 17–15
Pts: two players 11; Rebs: three players 6 Asts: Ydderick Gonzalez 4		Pts: Tristan Beckford 17; Rebs: Spencer Ahrens 9 Asts: Torian Lee 6

Estadio Obras Sanitarias, Buenos Aires
Referees: Ryan Johnson (USA), Alan Dos Santos (BRA), Franco Anselmo Krivokapich (ARG)

5 June 2024
15:10

Boxscore

Dominican Republic	63–52	Puerto Rico
Scoring by quarter: 19–11, 15–11, 14–11, 15–19
Pts: two players 14; Rebs: Lucas Morillo 12; Asts: Danny Carbuccia 6		Pts: Isaiah Brown 15; Rebs: Alejandro Aviles 15; Asts: Felipe Quinones 3

Estadio Obras Sanitarias, Buenos Aires
Referees: Fernando Leite (BRA), Orlando Jose Varela Diaz (HND), Gastón Rodríguez (URY)

=== Group B ===
Pos	Team	Pld	W	L	PF	PA	PD	Pts	Qualification
1	United States	3	3	0	326	177	+149	6	Advance to Quarterfinals
2	Argentina (H)	3	1	2	241	235	+6	4	Advance to Quarterfinals
3	Brazil	3	1	2	233	260	−27	4	Advance to Quarterfinals
4	Belize	3	1	2	233	361	−128	4	Advance to Quarterfinals

Source: FIBA
Rules for classification: 1) Points; 2) Head-to-head results; 3) Points difference; 4) Points scored.
(H) Hosts

3 June 2024
17:40

Boxscore

Belize	106–102	Brazil
Scoring by quarter: 24–23, 29–24, 30–27, 23–28
Pts: Josiah Moseley 31; Rebs: Douglas Langford 9 Asts: Devin Moody 4		Pts: Nolan Junior Kemm 19; Rebs: Enrico Borio 11; Asts: two players 8

Estadio Obras Sanitarias, Buenos Aires
Referees: Carmelo De La Rosa ALvarez (PRI), Samuel Hidalgo (DOM), Juan Fabian Valenzuela Estrada (MEX)

3 June 2024
20:10

Boxscore

Argentina	66–88	United States
Scoring by quarter: 13–19, 18–25, 22–18, 13–26
Pts: Tyler Kropp 15; Rebs: Tyler Kropp 9 Asts: Bruno Farías 5		Pts: Darius Acuff 22; Rebs: Daniel Jacobsen 10; Asts: John McKenney III 4

Estadio Obras Sanitarias, Buenos Aires
Referees: Kristian Paez (ECU), Yezid Carreño (COL), Kevin Lei (CAN)

4 June 2024
17:40

Boxscore

United States	150–54	Belize
Scoring by quarter: 39–15, 35–9, 37–15, 39–15
Pts: Darius Acuff Jr. 23; Rebs: Morez Johnson Jr. 15; Asts: Jeremiah Fears 6		Pts: Ian Parham 12; Rebs: Josiah Moseley 8 Asts: three players 3

Estadio Obras Sanitarias, Buenos Aires
Referees: Orlando Jose Varela Diaz (HND), Kevin Lei (CAN), Samuel Hidalgo (DOM)

4 June 2024
20:10

Boxscore

Brazil	74–66	Argentina
Scoring by quarter: 17–22, 15–11, 18–13, 24–20
Pts: Patrick Perna 21; Rebs: Enrico Borio 12; Asts: Matheus Monteiro 5		Pts: Tyler Kropp 26; Rebs: Tyler Kropp 13; Asts: Thiaco Sucatzky 5

Estadio Obras Sanitarias, Buenos Aires
Referees: Kristian Paez (ECU), Carmelo De La Rosa ALvarez (PRI), Gastón Rodríguez (URY)

5 June 2024
17:40

Boxscore

Brazil	57–88	United States
Scoring by quarter: 19–19, 14–31, 17–18, 7–20
Pts: Patrick Perna 10; Rebs: Gabriel Ferreira 7 Asts: Matheus Monteiro 5		Pts: two players 12; Rebs: Darius Acuff Jr. 8 Asts: Nikolas Khamenia 5

Estadio Obras Sanitarias, Buenos Aires
Referees: Kristian Paez (ECU), Yezid Carreño (COL), Samuel Hidalgo (DOM)

5 June 2024
20:10

Boxscore

Argentina	109–73	Belize
Scoring by quarter: 23–23, 34–19, 32–21, 20–10
Pts: Felipe Minzer 28; Rebs: two players 14; Asts: Thiago Sucatzky 8		Pts: Josiah Moseley 23; Rebs: Douglas Langford 12; Asts: two players 3

Estadio Obras Sanitarias, Buenos Aires
Referees: Carmelo De La Rosa ALvarez (PRI), Kevin Lei (CAN), Juan Fabian Valenzuela Estrada (MEX)

== Knockout stage ==
=== Bracket ===
Fifth place game
3A	Venezuela	64
3B	Brazil	66
Seventh place game
4B	Belize	51
4A	Puerto Rico	79

5th–8th place semifinals
4B	Belize	80
3A	Venezuela	87*
3B	Brazil	71
4A	Puerto Rico	57

Quarterfinals
1A	Dominican Republic	79
4B	Belize	69
2B	Argentina	79
3A	Venezuela	75
2A	Canada	72
3B	Brazil	68
1B	United States	98
4A	Puerto Rico	66

Semifinals
1A	Dominican Republic	66
2B	Argentina	75
2A	Canada	69
1B	United States	107

Final
2B	Argentina	70
1B	United States	110
Third place game
1A	Dominican Republic	67
2A	Canada	89

* denotes number of overtime periods

=== Quarterfinals ===
7 June 2024
12:40

Boxscore

United States	98–66	Puerto Rico
Scoring by quarter: 20–23, 26–16, 25–14, 27–13
Pts: John McKenney III 17; Rebs: Morez Johnson Jr. 17; Asts: Christopher Brown 6		Pts: Brandon Lee 22; Rebs: Adiel Lopez 10; Asts: Felipe Quinones 6

Estadio Obras Sanitarias, Buenos Aires
Referees: Alan Dos Santos (BRA), Yezid Carreño (COL), Juan Fabian Valenzuela Estrada (MEX)

7 June 2024
15:10

Boxscore

Dominican Republic	79–69	Belize
Scoring by quarter: 12–11, 22–23, 20–20, 25–15
Pts: Lucas Morillo 20; Rebs: Lucas Morillo 16; Asts: Danny Carbuccia 5		Pts: Josiah Moseley 25; Rebs: Josiah Moseley 13; Asts: Ian Parham 3

Estadio Obras Sanitarias, Buenos Aires
Referees: Fernando Leite (BRA), Orlando Jose Varela Diaz (HND), Gastón Rodríguez (URY)

7 June 2024
17:40

Boxscore

Canada	72–68	Brazil
Scoring by quarter: 15–5, 25–28, 15–20, 17–15
Pts: Jaion Pitt 17; Rebs: Jaion Pitt 11; Asts: Justus Haseley 8		Pts: Pedro Pastre 11; Rebs: Gustavo Guimarães 9 Asts: Patrick Perna 5

Estadio Obras Sanitarias, Buenos Aires
Referees: Carmelo De La Rosa ALvarez (PRI), Ryan Johnson (USA), Franco Anselmo Krivokapich (ARG)

7 June 2024
20:10

Boxscore

Argentina	79–75	Venezuela
Scoring by quarter: 15–21, 26–13, 19–15, 19–26
Pts: Tyler Kroop 22; Rebs: Felipe Minzer 15; Asts: Bruno Frias 6		Pts: Jeiminson Marquez 24; Rebs: Jeiminson Marquez 8 Asts: Ydderick Gonzalez 7

Estadio Obras Sanitarias, Buenos Aires
Referees: Kristian Paez (ECU), Kevin Lei (CAN), Samuel Hidalgo (DOM)

=== 5th–8th place semifinals ===
8 June 2024
12:40

Boxscore

Brazil	71–57	Puerto Rico
Scoring by quarter: 16–12, 19–12, 16–19, 20–14
Pts: Mathias Vazquez 20; Rebs: Mathias Vazquez 7 Asts: two players 4		Pts: Isaiah Brown 21; Rebs: two players 8 Asts: Chalier Torres 7

Estadio Obras Sanitarias, Buenos Aires
Referees: Kristian Paez (ECU), Franco Anselmo Krivokapich (ARG), Juan Fabian Valenzuela Estrada (MEX)

8 June 2024
15:10

Boxscore

Belize	80–87 (OT)	Venezuela
Scoring by quarter: 23–16, 22–19, 15–14, 8–19, Overtime: 12–19
Pts: Josiah Moseley 31; Rebs: Douglas Langford 11; Asts: Ian Parham 6		Pts: Jeiminson Marquez 32; Rebs: Jesus Centeno 15; Asts: Anthony Reyes 6

Estadio Obras Sanitarias, Buenos Aires
Referees: Kevin Lei (CAN), Ryan Johnson (USA), Samuel Hidalgo (DOM)

=== Semifinals ===
8 June 2024
17:40

Boxscore

Canada	69–107	United States
Scoring by quarter: 14–27, 17–30, 23–19, 15–31
Pts: Spencer Ahrens 13; Rebs: Olivier Rioux 6 Asts: Justus Haseley 4		Pts: four players 12; Rebs: Derrion Reid 10; Asts: Christopher Brown 5

Estadio Obras Sanitarias, Buenos Aires
Referees: Fernando Leite (BRA), Orlando Jose Varela Diaz (HND), Yezid Carreño (COL)

8 June 2024
20:10

Boxscore

Dominican Republic	66–75	Argentina
Scoring by quarter: 20–15, 13–18, 12–18, 21–24
Pts: Danny Carbuccia 28; Rebs: Lucas Morillo 6 Asts: Danny Carbuccia 7		Pts: Tyler Kropp 19; Rebs: Tyler Kropp 14; Asts: Thiago Sucatzky 8

Estadio Obras Sanitarias, Buenos Aires
Referees: Samuel Hidalgo (DOM), Gastón Rodríguez (URY), Juan Fabian Valenzuela Estrada (MEX)

=== Seventh place game ===
9 June 2024
12:40

Boxscore

Belize	51–79	Puerto Rico
Scoring by quarter: 12–21, 17–15, 11–21, 11–22
Pts: Devin Moody 12; Rebs: Wilford Dawson 7 Asts: Elijah Favela 2		Pts: Alejandro Aviles 18; Rebs: Alejandro Aviles 13; Asts: Chalier Torres 7

Estadio Obras Sanitarias, Buenos Aires
Referees: Orlando Jose Varela Diaz (HND), Yezid Carreño (COL), Franco Anselmo Krivokapich (ARG)

=== Fifth place game ===
9 June 2024
15:10

Boxscore

Brazil	66–64	Venezuela
Scoring by quarter: 10–19, 16–16, 17–16, 21–15
Pts: Anthony Reyes 18; Rebs: Jesus Centeno 8 Asts: Ydderick Gonzalez 4		Pts: Matheus Monteiro 15; Rebs: Nolan Junior Kemm 8 Asts: Matheus Monteiro 5

Estadio Obras Sanitarias, Buenos Aires
Referees: Samuel Hidalgo (DOM), Gastón Rodríguez (URY), Juan Fabian Valenzuela Estrada (MEX)

=== Third place game ===
9 June 2024
17:40

Boxscore

Dominican Republic	67–89	Canada
Scoring by quarter: 14–23, 26–23, 15–24, 12–19
Pts: Fernando De Los Santos 17; Rebs: Lucas Morillo 7 Asts: Adrian Brito 3		Pts: Efeosa Oliogu 23; Rebs: Spencer Ahrens 11; Asts: Efeosa Oliogu 7

Estadio Obras Sanitarias, Buenos Aires
Referees: Alan Dos Santos (BRA), Carmelo De La Rosa ALvarez (PRI), Ryan Johnson (USA)

=== Final ===
9 June 2024
20:10

Boxscore

Argentina	70–110	United States
Scoring by quarter: 23–24, 13–28, 13–37 , 20–21
Pts: Tyler Kropp 20; Rebs: two players 9 Asts: Bruno Farias 8		Pts: Darius Acuff Jr. 26; Rebs: Nikolas Khamenia 8 Asts: two players 9

Estadio Obras Sanitarias, Buenos Aires
Referees: Kristian Paez (ECU), Kevin Lei (CAN), Fernando Leite (BRA)

== Statistics and awards ==
=== Awards ===
2024 FIBA U18 AmeriCup winners

United States
11th title

Most Valuable Player
(United States) Darius Acuff Jr.

All Tournament Team

- (Dominican Republic) Danny Carbuccia
- (United States) Mikel Brown Jr.
- (United States) Darius Acuff Jr.
- (Canada) Tristan Beckford
- (Argentina) Tyler Kropp

== Final standings ==
Rank	Team	Record
1st place, gold medalist(s)	United States	6–0
2nd place, silver medalist(s)	Argentina	3–3
3rd place, bronze medalist(s)	Canada	4–2
4	Dominican Republic	4–2
5	Brazil	3–3
6	Venezuela	2–4
7	Puerto Rico	1–5
8	Belize	1–5

Qualified for the 2025 FIBA Under-19 Basketball World Cup
