= 2023 FIBA U17 South American Championship =

International basketball competition

Tournament details
- Host country: Colombia
- City: Valledupar
- Dates: 16–20 November 2023
- Teams: 8 (from 1 confederation)
- Venue: 1 (in 1 host city)

Final positions
- Champions: Argentina (15th title)
- Runners-up: Venezuela
- Third place: Brazil

Official website
- www.fiba.basketball

The 2023 FIBA U17 South American Championship was the 27th edition of the South American basketball championship for under-17 men's national teams. The tournament was played in Valledupar, Colombia, from 16 to 20 November 2023.

== Participating teams ==
- Argentina
- Brazil
- Chile
- Colombia
- Ecuador
- Paraguay
- Uruguay
- Venezuela

== First round ==
In the first round, the teams were drawn into two groups of four. The first two teams from each group advanced to the semifinals; the third and fourth teams advanced to the 5th–8th place playoffs.

All times are local (Colombia Time – UTC-5).

=== Group A ===
Pos	Team	Pld	W	L	PF	PA	PD	Pts	Qualification
1	Brazil	3	3	0	235	129	+106	6	Semifinals
2	Chile	3	2	1	148	188	−40	5	Semifinals
3	Paraguay	3	1	2	141	178	−37	4	5th–8th place playoffs
4	Ecuador	3	0	3	170	199	−29	3	5th–8th place playoffs

Source: FIBA

16 November 2023
14:00

Boxscore

Chile	71–56	Ecuador
Scoring by quarter: 22–7, 10–14, 18–20, 21–15

La Gota Fría, Valledupar

16 November 2023
16:30

Boxscore

Brazil	79–37	Paraguay
Scoring by quarter: 25–10, 17–8, 19–11, 18–8

La Gota Fría, Valledupar

17 November 2023
14:00

Boxscore

Paraguay	46–48	Chile
Scoring by quarter: 17–17, 8–12, 12–8, 9–11

La Gota Fría, Valledupar

17 November 2023
16:30

Boxscore

Ecuador	63–70	Brazil
Scoring by quarter: 16–17, 11–19, 12–17, 24–17

La Gota Fría, Valledupar

18 November 2023
14:00

Boxscore

Paraguay	58–51	Ecuador
Scoring by quarter: 15–13, 13–11, 11–10, 19–17

La Gota Fría, Valledupar

18 November 2023
16:30

Boxscore

Chile	29–86	Brazil
Scoring by quarter: 7–24, 11–20, 3–24, 8–18

La Gota Fría, Valledupar

=== Group B ===
Pos	Team	Pld	W	L	PF	PA	PD	Pts	Qualification
1	Argentina	3	3	0	190	168	+22	6	Semifinals
2	Venezuela	3	2	1	176	166	+10	5	Semifinals
3	Colombia (H)	3	1	2	180	185	−5	4	5th–8th place playoffs
4	Uruguay	3	0	3	170	197	−27	3	5th–8th place playoffs

Source: FIBA
(H) Hosts

16 November 2023
19:00

Boxscore

Venezuela	43–56	Argentina
Scoring by quarter: 10–14, 12–15, 9–12, 12–15

La Gota Fría, Valledupar

16 November 2023
21:30

Boxscore

Colombia	60–55	Uruguay
Scoring by quarter: 14–11, 11–19, 16–12, 19–13

La Gota Fría, Valledupar

17 November 2023
19:00

Boxscore

Uruguay	50–69	Venezuela
Scoring by quarter: 11–14, 9–23, 17–19, 13–13

La Gota Fría, Valledupar

17 November 2023
21:30

Boxscore

Argentina	66–60	Colombia
Scoring by quarter: 20–17, 27–6, 8–23, 11–14

La Gota Fría, Valledupar

18 November 2023
19:00

Boxscore

Uruguay	65–68	Argentina
Scoring by quarter: 14–22, 18–12, 19–18, 14–16

La Gota Fría, Valledupar

18 November 2023
21:30

Boxscore

Venezuela	64–60	Colombia
Scoring by quarter: 7–11, 25–15, 15–18, 17–16

La Gota Fría, Valledupar

== 5th–8th place playoffs ==
5th–8th place semifinals
A3	Paraguay	47
B4	Uruguay	72
B3	Colombia	68
A4	Ecuador	56

5th place match
B4	Uruguay	65
B3	Colombia	52
7th place match
A3	Paraguay	63
A4	Ecuador	74

=== 5th–8th place semifinals ===
19 November 2023
14:00

Boxscore

Paraguay	47–72	Uruguay
Scoring by quarter: 13–12, 7–20, 16–23, 11–17

La Gota Fría, Valledupar

19 November 2023
16:30

Boxscore

Colombia	68–56	Ecuador
Scoring by quarter: 22–19, 21–15, 12–11, 13–11

La Gota Fría, Valledupar

=== 7th place match ===
20 November 2023
14:00

Boxscore

Paraguay	63–74	Ecuador
Scoring by quarter: 12–14, 16–23, 19–20, 16–17

La Gota Fría, Valledupar

=== 5th place match ===
20 November 2023
16:30

Boxscore

Uruguay	65–52	Colombia
Scoring by quarter: 23–15, 8–19, 17–12, 17–6

La Gota Fría, Valledupar

== Championship playoffs ==
Semifinals
A1	Brazil	61
B2	Venezuela	79
B1	Argentina	73
A2	Chile	40

Final
B2	Venezuela	56
B1	Argentina	72
3rd place match
A1	Brazil	83
A2	Chile	45

=== Semifinals ===
19 November 2023
19:00

Boxscore

Brazil	61–79	Venezuela
Scoring by quarter: 20–18, 11–21, 18–10, 12–30

La Gota Fría, Valledupar

19 November 2023
21:30

Boxscore

Argentina	73–40	Chile
Scoring by quarter: 18–14, 15–8, 20–12, 20–6

La Gota Fría, Valledupar

=== 3rd place match ===
20 November 2023
19:00

Boxscore

Brazil	83–45	Chile
Scoring by quarter: 22–12, 20–11, 19–14, 22–8

La Gota Fría, Valledupar

=== Final ===
20 November 2023
21:30

Boxscore

Venezuela	56–72	Argentina
Scoring by quarter: 12–21, 18–16, 11–16, 15–19

La Gota Fría, Valledupar

== Final standings ==
Rank	Team
1st place, gold medalist(s)	Argentina
2nd place, silver medalist(s)	Venezuela
3rd place, bronze medalist(s)	Brazil
4	Chile
5	Uruguay
6	Colombia
7	Ecuador
8	Paraguay

Qualified for the 2024 FIBA U18 AmeriCup
