= Soviet Union men's national under-19 basketball team =

Soviet Union
- FIBA zone: FIBA Europe
- National federation: Soviet Basketball Federation

Under-19 World Championship
- Appearances: 4
- Medals: Silver: 1 (1983)

Under-18 European Championship
- Appearances: 15
- Medals: Gold: 8 (1964, 1966, 1968, 1970, 1978, 1980, 1982, 1984); Silver: 3 (1976, 1986, 1990); Bronze: 2 (1972) (1992 as CIS)
| Home | Away |
Medal record
| Event | 1st | 2nd | 3rd |
|---|---|---|---|
| U19 World Championship | 0 | 1 | 0 |
| U18 European Championship | 8 | 3 | 2 |
| Total | 8 | 4 | 2 |

The Soviet Union men's national under-18 and under-19 basketball team was a men's junior national basketball team of the Soviet Union. It represented the country in international under-18 and under-19 (under age 18 and under age 19) basketball competitions, until the dissolution of the Soviet Union in 1991. In 1992, CIS men's national under-18 basketball team represented the Commonwealth of Independent States in international under-18 competitions. After 1992, the successor countries all set up their own national teams.

== FIBA Under-19 World Championship participations ==
| Year | Pos. | Pld | W | L |
|---|---|---|---|---|
| (Brazil) 1979 | 5th | 8 | 4 | 4 |
| (West Germany) 1983 | 2nd place, silver medalist(s) | 10 | 8 | 2 |
| (Italy) 1987 | 7th | 7 | 4 | 3 |
| (Canada) 1991 | 9th | 8 | 7 | 1 |
| Total | 4/4 | 33 | 23 | 10 |

== FIBA Under-18 European Championship participations ==
| Year | Pos. | Pld | W | L |
|---|---|---|---|---|
| (Italy) 1964 | 1st place, gold medalist(s) | 5 | 5 | 0 |
| (Italy) 1966 | 1st place, gold medalist(s) | 5 | 5 | 0 |
| (Spain) 1968 | 1st place, gold medalist(s) | 7 | 7 | 0 |
| (Greece) 1970 | 1st place, gold medalist(s) | 7 | 7 | 0 |
| (Socialist Federal Republic of Yugoslavia) 1972 | 3rd place, bronze medalist(s) | 7 | 4 | 3 |
| (France) 1974 | 5th | 9 | 7 | 2 |
| (Spain) 1976 | 2nd place, silver medalist(s) | 8 | 7 | 1 |
| (Italy) 1978 | 1st place, gold medalist(s) | 7 | 7 | 0 |
| (Socialist Federal Republic of Yugoslavia) 1980 | 1st place, gold medalist(s) | 7 | 6 | 1 |
| (Bulgaria) 1982 | 1st place, gold medalist(s) | 7 | 7 | 0 |
| (Sweden) 1984 | 1st place, gold medalist(s) | 7 | 6 | 1 |
| (Austria) 1986 | 2nd place, silver medalist(s) | 7 | 6 | 1 |
| (Socialist Federal Republic of Yugoslavia) 1988 | 5th | 7 | 5 | 2 |
| (Netherlands) 1990 | 2nd place, silver medalist(s) | 7 | 5 | 2 |
Representing CIS
| (Hungary) 1992 | 3rd place, bronze medalist(s) | 7 | 5 | 2 |
| Total | 15/15 | 104 | 89 | 15 |

== See also ==
- Soviet Union men's national basketball team
- Soviet Union men's national under-16 basketball team
- Soviet Union women's national under-19 basketball team
- Russia men's national basketball team
- Russia men's national under-19 basketball team
