= Lucas Pereira =

Brazilian footballer (1982–2021)

Personal information
- Full name: Waldir Lucas Pereira Filho
- Date of birth: 5 February 1982
- Place of birth: Campinas, Brazil
- Date of death: 20 June 2021 (aged 39)
- Place of death: Campinas, Brazil
- Height: 1.83 m (6 ft 0 in)
- Position: Forward

Senior career*
Years	Team	Apps	(Gls)
2001–2003	Ponte Preta		
2004	Portuguesa		
2004–2008	Ajaccio	89	(23)
2006–2007	→ São Caetano (loan)		
2008	Suwon Samsung Bluewings	4	(0)
2009	Duque de Caxias	8	(0)
2009	Al-Markhiya		
2010	Ethnikos Piraeus	17	(6)
2011	Metropolitano	4	
2011–2012	América-SP		
- * Club domestic league appearances and goals

Waldir Lucas Pereira Filho (5 February 1982 – 20 June 2021) was a Brazilian professional footballer who played as a forward.

He died from COVID-19 aged 39 on 20 June 2021.
