= 1991 FIBA Under-19 World Championship =

1991 FIBA Under-19 Basketball World Cup
Tournament details
- Host country: Canada
- Dates: 26 July – 4 August
- Teams: 16
- Venue(s): 1 (in 1 host city)

Final positions
- Champions: United States (3rd title)

Tournament statistics
- MVP: (Socialist Federal Republic of Yugoslavia) Dejan Bodiroga
- Top scorer: (Syria) Anwor Abdoul Houy (26.0)
- PPG (Team): Soviet Union (105.6)

Official website
- 1991 FIBA U19 World Championship

The 1991 FIBA Under-19 World Championship (French: Championnat du monde des moins de 19 ans 1991 de la FIBA) was the 4th edition of the FIBA U19 World Championship. It was held in Edmonton, Canada from 26 July to 4 August 1991. The United States won their third championship in the tournament, after beating Italy in overtime 90–85 in the final. Dejan Bodiroga of Yugoslavia was named the tournament MVP, despite their team losing the bronze medal game against Argentina.

== Venue ==
Edmonton	Alberta
n/a	1991 FIBA Under-19 World Championship (Alberta)
Capacity: n/a	1991 FIBA Under-19 World Championship (Alberta)

== Qualified teams ==
Means of Qualification	Dates	Venue	Berths	Qualifiers
Host Nation	—	—	1	Canada
Defending Champions	28 July – 5 August 1987	(Italy) Bormio	1	Yugoslavia
1990 FIBA Under-18 African Championship	—	(Angola) Luanda	2	Nigeria; Angola
1990 FIBA Under-18 Americas Championship	—	(Uruguay) Montevideo	4	United States; Argentina; Brazil; Uruguay
1990 FIBA Under-18 Asian Championship	25 August – 2 September 1990	(Japan) Nagoya	3	Japan; Syria; China
1990 FIBA Under-18 European Championship	18–25 August 1990	(Netherlands) Groningen / Emmen	4	Italy; Soviet Union; Spain; Romania
1990 FIBA Under-18 Oceania Championship	—	—	1	Australia
Total			16	

== Preliminary round ==
=== Group A ===
Team	Pld	W	L	PF	PA	PD	Pts	First Tiebreaker Classification for Tied Teams	Second Tiebreaker Basket Average for Tied Teams
Romania	3	2	1	230	216	+14	5	1W−1L	(138/134, 1.0299)
Argentina	3	2	1	221	214	+7	5	1W−1L	(151/152, 0.9934)
Australia	3	2	1	237	227	+10	5	1W−1L	(147/150, 0.9800)
China	3	0	3	221	252	–31	3		

27 July 1991
13:00

Boxscore

China	82–92	Romania
Scoring by half: 36–41, 46–51
Pts: Wu 24		Pts: Mureșan 31

Edmonton

27 July 1991
13:00

Boxscore

Australia	89–75	Argentina
Scoring by half: 48–35, 41–40
Pts: Reidy 18		Pts: Racca 18

Edmonton

28 July 1991
13:00

Boxscore

Romania	75–58	Australia
Scoring by half: 35–33, 40–25
Pts: Mureșan 33		Pts: Armfield 12

Edmonton

28 July 1991
18:30

Boxscore

Argentina	70–62	China
Scoring by half: 33–33, 37–29
Pts: Diaz 23		Pts: Zhang 17

Edmonton

29 July 1991
13:00

Boxscore

Argentina	76–63	Romania
Scoring by half: 43–35, 33–28
Pts: Racca 31		Pts: Mureșan 24

Edmonton

29 July 1991
18:30

Boxscore

China	77–90	Australia
Scoring by half: 33–33, 37–29
Pts: Diaz 23		Pts: Liang 22

Edmonton

=== Group B ===
Team	Pld	W	L	PF	PA	PD	Pts
United States	3	3	0	316	225	+91	6
Spain	3	2	1	330	232	+98	5
Nigeria	3	1	2	221	234	–13	4
Japan	3	0	3	163	339	–176	3

27 July 1991
18:30

Boxscore

United States	124–51	Japan
Scoring by half: 63–28, 61–23
Pts: Miller 18		Pts: Kazama 16

Edmonton

27 July 1991
20:30

Boxscore

Spain	96–66	Nigeria
Scoring by half: 55–35, 41–31
Pts: Paraiso 20		Pts: Nikoro 14

Edmonton

28 July 1991
20:30

Boxscore

United States	86–73	Nigeria
Scoring by half: 45–47, 41–26
Pts: Miller 24		Pts: Awojobi 28

Edmonton

29 July 1991
13:00

Boxscore

Nigeria	82–52	Japan
Scoring by half: 19–37, 63–15
Pts: Awojobi 30		Pts: Kazama 11

Edmonton

29 July 1991
20:30

Boxscore

Spain	101–106 (OT)	United States
Scoring by half: 42–46, 52–48 Overtime: 7–12
Pts: Reyes 28		Pts: Caver 26

Edmonton

2 August 1991
15:00

Boxscore

Japan	60–133	Spain
Scoring by half: 23–66, 37–67
Pts: Iwasa 15		Pts: Reyes 22

Edmonton

=== Group C ===
Team	Pld	W	L	PF	PA	PD	Pts
Italy	3	3	0	306	199	+107	6
Canada	3	2	1	251	242	+9	5
Uruguay	3	1	2	221	270	–49	4
Angola	3	0	3	198	265	–67	3

27 July 1991
13:00

Boxscore

Italy	96–78	Canada
Scoring by half: 52–40, 44–38
Pts: Fučka 21		Pts: George 16

Edmonton

27 July 1991
15:00

Boxscore

Uruguay	78–74	Angola
Scoring by half: 46–36, 32–38
Pts: Apud 23		Pts: Morais, Domingos 16

Edmonton

28 July 1991
13:00

Boxscore

Angola	59–96	Italy
Scoring by half: 34–56, 25–40
Pts: Domingos 22		Pts: Portaluppi 17

Edmonton

28 July 1991
18:30

Boxscore

Canada	82–81	Uruguay
Scoring by half: 46–37, 36–44
Pts: Njoku 20		Pts: Apud 17

Edmonton

29 July 1991
13:00

Boxscore

Italy	114–62	Uruguay
Scoring by half: 43–32, 71–30
Pts: Ruggeri 24		Pts: Castro 15

Edmonton

29 July 1991
18:30

Boxscore

Angola	65–91	Canada
Scoring by half: 27–51, 38–40
Pts: Lutonda 25		Pts: Van Koughnett 15

Edmonton

=== Group D ===
Team	Pld	W	L	PF	PA	PD	Pts	First Tiebreaker Classification for Tied Teams	Second Tiebreaker Basket Average for Tied Teams
Brazil	3	2	1	295	254	+41	5	1W−1L	(182/174, 1.0460)
Yugoslavia	3	2	1	248	237	+11	5	1W−1L	(168/170, 0.9882)
Soviet Union	3	2	1	278	273	+5	5	1W−1L	(179/185, 0.9676)
Syria	3	0	3	235	292	–57	3		

27 July 1991
18:30

Boxscore

Brazil	113–80	Syria
Scoring by half: 62–31, 51–49
Pts: Klafke 26		Pts: Abou Saada 35

Edmonton

27 July 1991
20:30

Boxscore

Soviet Union	83–90	Yugoslavia
Scoring by half: 46–43, 37–47
Pts: Mikhailov 17		Pts: Čizmić 22

Edmonton

28 July 1991
15:00

Boxscore

Yugoslavia	78–87	Brazil
Scoring by half: 27–42, 51–45
Pts: Bodiroga, Radović 18		Pts: Klafke 19

Edmonton

28 July 1991
20:30

Boxscore

Syria	88–99	Soviet Union
Scoring by half: 40–50, 48–49
Pts: Abou Saada, Abdoul Houy 30		Pts: Mikhailov 20

Edmonton

29 July 1991
15:00

Boxscore

Syria	67–80	Yugoslavia
Scoring by half: 37–43, 30–37
Pts: Abou Saada 16		Pts: Rebrača 16

Edmonton

29 July 1991
20:30

Boxscore

Soviet Union	96–95	Brazil
Scoring by half: 59–53, 37–42
Pts: Yudin 18		Pts: Da Silva 27

Edmonton

== Quarterfinal round ==
=== Group E ===
Team	Pld	W	L	PF	PA	PD	Pts	First Tiebreaker Classification for Tied Teams	Second Tiebreaker Basket Average for Tied Teams
Italy	3	3	0	257	240	+17	6		
Yugoslavia	3	1	2	239	230	+9	4	1W−1L	(176/158, 1.1139)
Spain	3	1	2	262	268	–6	4	1W−1L	(174/179, 0.9721)
Romania	3	1	2	232	252	–20	4	1W−1L	(143/156, 0.9167)

30 July 1991
13:00

Boxscore

Yugoslavia	63–72	Italy
Scoring by half: 33–36, 30–36
Pts: Tarlać 14		Pts: Fučka 18

Edmonton

30 July 1991
15:00

Boxscore

Romania	84–75	Spain
Scoring by half: 43–23, 41–52
Pts: Mureșan 26		Pts: Esteller 20

Edmonton

31 July 1991
13:00

Boxscore

Romania	59–81	Yugoslavia
Scoring by half: 35–44, 24–37
Pts: Roschnafsky 23		Pts: Radović 23

Edmonton

31 July 1991
18:30

Boxscore

Italy	89–88	Spain
Scoring by half: 47–51, 42–37
Pts: Fučka 19		Pts: Galilea, Esteller 16

Edmonton

1 August 1991
13:00

Boxscore

Romania	89–96	Italy
Scoring by half: 58–43, 31–53
Pts: Mureșan 28		Pts: Calbini 20

Edmonton

1 August 1991
15:00

Boxscore

Spain	99–95	Yugoslavia
Scoring by half: 47–47, 52–48
Pts: Álvarez 21		Pts: Bodiroga 20

Edmonton

=== Group F ===
Team	Pld	W	L	PF	PA	PD	Pts
United States	3	3	0	260	212	+48	6
Argentina	3	2	1	218	208	+10	5
Brazil	3	1	2	238	250	–12	4
Canada	3	0	3	206	252	–46	3

30 July 1991
18:00

Boxscore

Argentina	62–69	United States
Scoring by half: 38–30, 24–39
Pts: Racca 21		Pts: Caver 13

Edmonton

30 July 1991
20:30

Boxscore

Brazil	86–69	Canada
Scoring by half: 48–37, 38–32
Pts: Joerke 32		Pts: Vassell 14

Edmonton

31 July 1991
15:00

Boxscore

Argentina	87–74	Brazil
Scoring by half: 42–42, 45–32
Pts: Montecchia 24		Pts: Mazzuchini, Da Silva 15

Edmonton

31 July 1991
20:30

Boxscore

Canada	72–97	United States
Scoring by half: 30–45, 42–52
Pts: Ryan 14		Pts: Faulkner, Person 12

Edmonton

1 August 1991
18:30

Boxscore

United States	94–78	Brazil
Scoring by half: 54–38, 40–40
Pts: Faulkner 16		Pts: Klafke 20

Edmonton

1 August 1991
20:30

Boxscore

Argentina	69–65	Canada
Scoring by half: 32–24, 37–41
Pts: Racca 20		Pts: Vassell 18

Edmonton

=== Group G ===
Team	Pld	W	L	PF	PA	PD	Pts
Syria	3	3	0	248	229	+19	6
Australia	3	2	1	279	191	+88	5
Uruguay	3	1	2	240	249	–9	4
Japan	3	0	3	202	300	–98	3

30 July 1991
13:00

Boxscore

Australia	113–47	Japan
Scoring by half: 54–20, 59–27
Pts: Goodwin, Ronaldson 18		Pts: Yaoita 11

Edmonton

30 July 1991
18:30

Boxscore

Syria	79–78	Uruguay
Scoring by half: 39–43, 40–35
Pts: Abou Saada, Abdoul Houy 27		Pts: Niquichenco 25

Edmonton

31 July 1991
13:00

Boxscore

Uruguay	94–76	Japan
Scoring by half: 50–34, 44–42
Pts: Apud 21		Pts: Minamiyama 19

Edmonton

31 July 1991
18:30

Boxscore

Australia	72–76	Syria
Scoring by half: 37–40, 35–36
Pts: Ronaldson 26		Pts: Issa Abdullah 19

Edmonton

1 August 1991
13:00

Boxscore

Australia	94–68	Uruguay
Scoring by half: 49–45, 45–23
Pts: Ronaldson 24		Pts: Apud 15

Edmonton

1 August 1991
18:30

Boxscore

Japan	79–93	Syria
Scoring by half: 33–52, 46–41
Pts: Kawamoto 22		Pts: Abdoul Houy 27

Edmonton

=== Group H ===
Team	Pld	W	L	PF	PA	PD	Pts
Soviet Union	3	3	0	351	222	+129	6
China	3	2	1	254	248	+6	5
Angola	3	1	2	203	259	–56	4
Nigeria	3	0	3	222	301	–79	3

30 July 1991
15:00

Boxscore

China	96–77	Nigeria
Scoring by half: 50–38, 46–39
Pts: Wu 30		Pts: Nikoro 25

Edmonton

30 July 1991
20:30

Boxscore

Soviet Union	109–69	Angola
Scoring by half: 39–43, 40–35
Pts: Yudin 21		Pts: Neto 19

Edmonton

31 July 1991
15:00

Boxscore

Angola	70–66	Nigeria
Scoring by half: 40–30, 30–36
Pts: Martins 27		Pts: Awojobi 28

Edmonton

31 July 1991
18:30

Boxscore

China	74–107	Soviet Union
Scoring by half: 41–63, 33–44
Pts: Hu 24		Pts: Grachev 24

Edmonton

1 August 1991
15:00

Boxscore

China	84–64	Angola
Scoring by half: 50–30, 34–34
Pts: Liang 29		Pts: Martins, Domingos, Tchiengo 14

Edmonton

1 August 1991
20:30

Boxscore

Nigeria	79–135	Soviet Union
Scoring by half: 31–53, 48–82
Pts: Okunrinyo 21		Pts: Kudelin 20

Edmonton

== Classification 13th–16th ==
Semifinals
3 August
Uruguay	69
Nigeria	66
3 August
Japan	58
Angola	69

Thirteenth place
4 August
Uruguay	77
Angola	78
Fifteenth place
4 August
Japan	95
Nigeria	120

Source: FIBA Archive

=== Semifinals ===
3 August 1991
15:00

Boxscore

Nigeria	66–69	Uruguay
Scoring by half: 37–26, 29–43
Pts: Okunrinyo 16		Pts: Apud 20

Edmonton

3 August 1991
20:30

Boxscore

Japan	58–69	Angola
Scoring by half: 18–26, 40–43
Pts: Minamiyama 17		Pts: Victoriano 18

Edmonton

=== 15th place ===
4 August 1991
09:00

Boxscore

Nigeria	120–95	Japan
Scoring by half: 60–44, 60–51
Pts: Okeke 34		Pts: Mori 25

Edmonton

=== 13th place ===
4 August 1991
09:00

Boxscore

Uruguay	77–78	Angola
Scoring by half: 46–38, 31–40
Pts: Niquichenco 21		Pts: Domingos 25

Edmonton

== Classification 9th–12th ==
Semifinals
3 August
Syria	82
China	93
3 August
Soviet Union	82
Australia	81

Ninth place
4 August
China	77
Soviet Union	134
Eleventh place
4 August
Syria	80
Australia	104

Source: FIBA Archive

=== Semifinals ===
3 August 1991
13:00

Boxscore

Soviet Union	82–81	Australia
Scoring by half: 42–41, 40–40
Pts: 4 players 13		Pts: Ronaldson 20

Edmonton

3 August 1991
15:30

Boxscore

Syria	82–93	China
Scoring by half: 35–39, 47–54
Pts: Abdoul Houy 31		Pts: Hu 27

Edmonton

=== 11th place ===
4 August 1991
09:00

Boxscore

Australia	104–80	Syria
Scoring by half: 57–36, 47–44
Pts: Armfield, Close, Reidy 17		Pts: Abdoul Houy 34

Edmonton

=== 9th place ===
4 August 1991
09:00

Boxscore

Soviet Union	134–77	China
Scoring by half: 82–44, 52–33
Pts: Mikhailov 25		Pts: Liang 17

Edmonton

== Classification 5th–8th ==
Semifinals
3 August
Spain	92
Canada	77
3 August
Brazil	77
Romania	104

Fifth place
4 August
Spain	96
Romania	110
Seventh place
4 August
Canada	89
Brazil	93

Source: FIBA Archive

=== Semifinals ===
3 August 1991
13:00

Boxscore

Canada	77–92	Spain
Scoring by half: 47–39, 30–53
Pts: Vassell, Van Koughnett 13		Pts: Fabon 28

Edmonton

3 August 1991
20:30

Boxscore

Romania	104–77	Brazil
Scoring by half: 47–39, 57–38
Pts: Alexe 33		Pts: Cambraia 17

Edmonton

=== 7th place ===
4 August 1991
11:00

Boxscore

Canada	89–93	Brazil
Scoring by half: 41–47, 48–46
Pts: Hamilton 21		Pts: Klafke 23

Edmonton

=== 5th place ===
4 August 1991
11:00

Boxscore

Spain	96–110	Romania
Scoring by half: 51–59, 45–51
Pts: Fabon 20		Pts: Mureșan 24

Edmonton

== Final round ==
Semifinals
3 August
Italy	79
Argentina	63
3 August
United States	76
Yugoslavia	74

Final
4 August
Italy	85
United States (OT)	90
Third place
4 August
Argentina	74
Yugoslavia	71

Source: FIBA Archive

=== Semifinals ===
3 August 1991
15:00

Boxscore

Italy	79–63	Argentina
Scoring by half: 36–29, 43–34
Pts: Fučka 16		Pts: Racca 27

Edmonton

3 August 1991
18:30

Boxscore

United States	76–74	Yugoslavia
Scoring by half: 34–34, 42–40
Pts: Person 14		Pts: Tarlać 27

Edmonton

=== 3rd place ===
4 August 1991
11:00

Boxscore

Argentina	74–71	Yugoslavia
Scoring by half: 38–41, 36–30
Pts: Racca 27		Pts: Radović 23

Edmonton

=== Final ===
4 August 1991
13:00

Boxscore

Italy	85–90 (OT)	United States
Scoring by half: 44–30, 33–47 Overtime: 8–13
Pts: Fučka 20		Pts: Reeves 20

Edmonton

== Final standings ==
Rank	Team	Record
1st place, gold medalist(s)	United States	8–0
2nd place, silver medalist(s)	Italy	7–1
3rd place, bronze medalist(s)	Argentina	5–3
4th	Yugoslavia	3–5
5th	Romania	5–3
6th	Spain	4–4
7th	Brazil	4–4
8th	Canada	2–6
9th	Soviet Union	7–1
10th	China	3–5
11th	Australia	5–3
12th	Syria	3–5
13th	Angola	3–5
14th	Uruguay	3–5
15th	Nigeria	2–6
16th	Japan	0–8

Source: FIBA Archive

== Awards ==
1991 FIBA Under-19 World Championship

United States
Third title

Most Valuable Player
(Socialist Federal Republic of Yugoslavia) Dejan Bodiroga
