= Wagner da Silva (basketball) =

Brazilian basketball player

Personal information
- Born: 1 February 1961 (age 65) São Paulo, Brazil
- Listed height: 6 ft 4.75 in (1.95 m)
- Listed weight: 195 lb (88 kg)
- Position: Small forward

Wagner Machado da Silva, also commonly known as Wagner da Silva, or simply as Wagner (born 1 February 1961), is a Brazilian former professional basketball player.

== National team career ==
With the senior Brazilian national basketball team, da Silva competed at the 1980 Summer Olympics.
