= Venezuela men's national under-19 basketball team =

Venezuela
- FIBA zone: FIBA Americas
- National federation: Federación Venezolana de Baloncesto

U19 World Cup
- Appearances: 3
- Medals: None

U18 AmeriCup
- Appearances: 7
- Medals: (silver) Silver: (2002)

U17 South American Championship
- Appearances: 26
- Medals: (silver) Silver: 4 (1984, 1994, 2007, 2023); (bronze) Bronze: 4 (1986, 1998, 2000, 2025)

The Venezuela men's national under-17, under-18 and under-19 basketball team is a national basketball team of Venezuela, administered by the Venezuelan Basketball Federation. It represents the country in international under-17, under-18 and under-19 basketball competitions.

== Results ==
=== FIBA Under-17 South American Championship ===
Year	Result
1955	5th
1972	5th
1973	4th
1975	5th
1977	5th
1981	5th
1982	5th
1984	2nd place, silver medalist(s)
1986	3rd place, bronze medalist(s)
1988	5th
1990	4th
1994	2nd place, silver medalist(s)
1996	4th

Year	Result
1998	3rd place, bronze medalist(s)
2000	3rd place, bronze medalist(s)
2005	4th
2007	2nd place, silver medalist(s)
2009	4th
2011	5th
2013	5th
2015	5th
2017	7th
2019	5th
2022	5th
2023	2nd place, silver medalist(s)
2025	3rd place, bronze medalist(s)

=== FIBA Under-18 AmeriCup ===
Year	Result
1990	8th
1994	4th
1998	4th
2002	2nd place, silver medalist(s)
2008	5th
2024	6th
2026	6th

=== FIBA Under-19 Basketball World Cup ===
Year	Result
1995	12th
1999	12th
2003	9th

== See also ==
- Venezuela men's national basketball team
- Venezuela men's national under-15 and under-16 basketball team
- Venezuela women's national under-17 and under-18 basketball team
