= Uruguay men's national under-19 basketball team =

Uruguay
- FIBA zone: FIBA Americas
- National federation: FUBB

U19 World Cup
- Appearances: 3
- Medals: None

U18 AmeriCup
- Appearances: 6
- Medals: None

U17 South American Championship
- Appearances: 28
- Medals: (gold) Gold: 1 (1982); (silver) Silver: 3 (2005, 2009, 2013); (bronze) Bronze: 13 (1955, 1972, 1973, 1975, 1977, 1979, 1981, 1988, 1990, 1992, 1996, 2007, 2019)

The Uruguay men's national under-17, under-18 and under-19 basketball team is a national basketball team of Uruguay, administered by the Federación Uruguaya de Básquetbol - "FUBB". It represents the country in international under-17, under-18 and under-19 basketball competitions.

== FIBA South America Under-17 Championship for Men participations ==
Year	Result
1955	3rd place, bronze medalist(s)
1972	3rd place, bronze medalist(s)
1973	3rd place, bronze medalist(s)
1975	3rd place, bronze medalist(s)
1977	3rd place, bronze medalist(s)
1979	3rd place, bronze medalist(s)
1981	3rd place, bronze medalist(s)
1982	1st place, gold medalist(s)
1984	4th
1986	4th
1988	3rd place, bronze medalist(s)
1990	3rd place, bronze medalist(s)
1992	3rd place, bronze medalist(s)
1994	4th

Year	Result
1996	3rd place, bronze medalist(s)
1998	6th
2000	4th
2005	2nd place, silver medalist(s)
2007	3rd place, bronze medalist(s)
2009	2nd place, silver medalist(s)
2011	4th
2013	2nd place, silver medalist(s)
2015	6th
2017	6th
2019	3rd place, bronze medalist(s)
2022	4th
2023	5th
2025	4th

== FIBA Under-18 AmeriCup participations ==
Year	Result
1990	4th
1994	9th
2006	6th
2008	6th
2010	5th
2014	8th

== FIBA Under-19 Basketball World Cup participations ==
Year	Result
1979	8th
1983	12th
1991	14th

== See also ==
- Uruguay men's national basketball team
- Uruguay men's national under-15 and under-16 basketball team
- Uruguay women's national under-17 basketball team
