= 1979 FIBA Under-19 World Championship =

1979 FIBA Under-19 Basketball World Cup
Tournament details
- Host country: Brazil
- Dates: 15–25 August
- Teams: 12 (from 5 federations)
- Venue(s): 1 (in 1 host city)

Final positions
- Champions: United States (1st title)

Tournament statistics
- Top scorer: (Uruguay) Horacio López (33.2)
- PPG (Team): United States (104.7)

Official website
- 1979 FIBA U19 World Championship

The 1979 FIBA Under-19 World Championship (Portuguese: 1979 Campeonato Mundial FIBA Sub-19) was the maiden edition of the FIBA U19 World Championship. It was held in Salvador, Bahia, Brazil from 15 to 25 August 1979.

The United States notched their first-ever world juniors championship by sweeping both the preliminary round and the championship round, winning the Gold Medal against the hosts Brazil in the final day of the tournament, 75–55.

== Preliminary round ==
=== Group A ===
Team	Pld	W	L	PF	PA	PD	Pts
Italy	5	4	1	409	388	+21	9
Yugoslavia	5	4	1	419	376	+43	9
Brazil	5	3	2	440	378	+62	8
Uruguay	5	2	3	440	467	−27	7
Australia	5	2	3	372	398	−26	7
Philippines	5	0	5	444	517	−73	5

15 August 1979
19:00

Boxscore

Australia	67–89	Yugoslavia
Scoring by half: 32–49, 35–40
Pts: Patterson 18		Pts: Čutura 14

Salvador

15 August 1979
21:10

Boxscore

Brazil	123–80	Philippines
Scoring by half: 65–29, 58–51
Pts: dos Santos 25		Pts: Banal 15

Salvador

15 August 1979
23:00

Boxscore

Uruguay	98–102 (OT)	Italy
Scoring by half: 46–48, 42–40 Overtime: 10–14
Pts: López 38		Pts: Fantin 21

Salvador

16 August 1979
20:00

Boxscore

Philippines	71–88	Italy
Scoring by half: 37–51, 34–37
Pts: Saldaña 31		Pts: Tonut 16

Salvador

16 August 1979
21:50

Boxscore

Brazil	71–73	Australia
Scoring by half: 33–34, 38–39
Pts: Vitoria 15		Pts: Gaze 16

Salvador

16 August 1979
23:40

Boxscore

Yugoslavia	89–78	Uruguay
Scoring by half: 33–43, 56–35
Pts: Radović, Dogan 18		Pts: López 33

Salvador

17 August 1979
19:00

Boxscore

Uruguay	79–72	Australia
Scoring by half: 46–37, 33–35
Pts: López 35		Pts: Sengstock 21

Salvador

17 August 1979
20:55

Boxscore

Brazil	85–79	Italy
Scoring by half: 48–37, 37–42
Pts: dos Santos 18		Pts: Fantin 16

Salvador

17 August 1979
22:40

Boxscore

Yugoslavia	106–102	Philippines
Scoring by half: 48–53, 58–49
Pts: Grbović 24		Pts: Saldaña 31

Salvador

18 August 1979
19:00

Boxscore

Australia	89–83	Philippines
Scoring by half: 49–33, 40–50
Pts: Pearce 22		Pts: Cristobal 27

Salvador

18 August 1979
20:45

Boxscore

Italy	64–63	Yugoslavia
Scoring by half: 33–26, 31–37
Pts: Riva 22		Pts: Čutura 26

Salvador

18 August 1979
22:40

Boxscore

Brazil	96–74	Uruguay
Scoring by half: 56–26, 40–48
Pts: Pedrosa 25		Pts: López 21

Salvador

19 August 1979
18:00

Boxscore

Uruguay	111–108	Philippines
Scoring by half: 61–53, 50–55
Pts: López 39		Pts: Cristobal 24

Salvador

19 August 1979
19:45

Boxscore

Australia	71–76	Italy
Scoring by half: 37–51, 34–37
Pts: Gaze 18		Pts: Riva 23

Salvador

19 August 1979
21:30

Boxscore

Brazil	65–72	Yugoslavia
Scoring by half: 28–35, 37–37
Pts: da Silva 18		Pts: Čutura 24

Salvador

=== Group B ===
Team	Pld	W	L	PF	PA	PD	Pts
United States	5	5	0	427	236	+191	10
Argentina	5	4	1	472	357	+115	9
Soviet Union	5	3	2	459	362	+97	8
Panama	5	2	3	293	332	−39	6
Canada	5	1	4	390	442	−52	6
Egypt	5	0	5	278	590	−312	5

15 August 1979

United States	2–0	Panama
USA won by forfeit after Panama failed to appear

Presidente Prudente

15 August 1979
19:00

Boxscore

Argentina	150–44	Egypt
Scoring by half: 75–12, 75–32
Pts: Politi 23		Pts: Nazmi 10

Presidente Prudente

15 August 1979
21:45

Boxscore

Soviet Union	117–72	Canada
Scoring by half: 51–29, 66–43
Pts: Grdzelidze, Nagayama, Popov 26		Pts: Lichti 15

Presidente Prudente

16 August 1979
18:00

Boxscore

Soviet Union	126–60	Egypt
Scoring by half: 72–38, 54–22
Pts: Popov 28		Pts: Kinoshita 22

Presidente Prudente

16 August 1979
20:10

Boxscore

Canada	80–81	Panama
Scoring by half: 48–48, 32–33
Pts: Pasquale 22		Pts: Grenald, Macias 18

Presidente Prudente

16 August 1979
21:45

Boxscore

United States	98–61	Argentina
Scoring by half: 58–31, 40–30
Pts: Perkins 13		Pts: Duffy 12

Presidente Prudente

17 August 1979
19:00

Boxscore

United States	105–59	Canada
Scoring by half: 49–17, 56–42
Pts: White 22		Pts: Fitzgerald 11

Presidente Prudente

17 August 1979
21:00

Boxscore

Egypt	68–78	Panama
Scoring by half: 24–42, 44–36
Pts: Elhabash 21		Pts: Macias 29

Presidente Prudente

17 August 1979
22:45

Boxscore

Argentina	74–72	Soviet Union
Scoring by half: 36–41, 38–31
Pts: Aréjula 20		Pts: Popov 20

Presidente Prudente

18 August 1979
19:00

Boxscore

Soviet Union	92–62	Panama
Scoring by half: 38–30, 54–32
Pts: Berezhniy 20		Pts: Gálvez 17

Presidente Prudente

18 August 1979
21:00

Boxscore

United States	128–38	Egypt
Scoring by half: 70–18, 58–20
Pts: Perkins 13		Pts: Kinoshita 8

Presidente Prudente

18 August 1979
22:45

Boxscore

Argentina	97–71	Canada
Scoring by half: 36–41, 38–31
Pts: Aréjula 22		Pts: Pasquale 17

Presidente Prudente

19 August 1979
18:00

Boxscore

Canada	108–68	Egypt
Scoring by half: 56–20, 52–48
Pts: Lichti 33		Pts: Kinoshita 21

Presidente Prudente

19 August 1979
19:50

Boxscore

Argentina	90–72	Panama
Scoring by half: 47–31, 43–41
Pts: Maretto 21		Pts: Gálvez 24

Presidente Prudente

19 August 1979
23:00

Boxscore

United States	94–78	Soviet Union
Scoring by half: 47–37, 47–41
Pts: Floyd 19		Pts: Grdzelidze 25

Presidente Prudente

== Final round ==
=== Classification 7th–12th ===
Team	Pld	W	L	PF	PA	PD	Pts
Canada	3	3	0	230	212	+18	6
Uruguay	3	2	1	300	217	+83	5
Australia	3	2	1	207	185	+22	5
Philippines	3	2	1	286	235	+51	5
Panama	3	0	3	213	241	−28	3
Egypt	3	0	3	194	340	−146	3

August 1979

Boxscore

Australia	64–63	Panama
Scoring by half: 30–33, 35–40

São Bernardo do Campo, São Paulo

August 1979

Boxscore

Uruguay	126–67	Egypt
Scoring by half: 67–39, 59–28

Salvador

August 1979

Boxscore

Canada	89–81	Philippines
Scoring by half: 42–38, 47–43

Salvador

August 1979

Boxscore

Canada	78–76	Uruguay
Scoring by half: 42–31, 36–45

Salvador

August 1979

Boxscore

Australia	88–59	Egypt
Scoring by half: 42–31, 36–45

Salvador

August 1979

Boxscore

Panama	78–79	Philippines
Scoring by half: 32–28, 46–41

Salvador

August 1979

Boxscore

Egypt	68–126	Philippines
Scoring by half: 38–66, 30–60

Salvador

August 1979

Boxscore

Australia	55–63	Canada
Scoring by half: 31–35, 24–28

Salvador

August 1979

Boxscore

Uruguay	98–72	Panama
Scoring by half: 47–33, 51–39

Salvador

=== Championship round ===
Team	Pld	W	L	PF	PA	PD	Pts
United States	3	3	0	308	206	+102	6
Brazil	3	2	1	205	223	−18	5
Argentina	3	2	1	221	219	+2	5
Yugoslavia	3	1	2	237	257	−20	4
Soviet Union	3	1	2	237	243	−6	4
Italy	3	0	3	226	286	−60	3

20 August 1979
20:00

Boxscore

Italy	77–134	United States
Scoring by half: 35–64, 42–70
Pts: Fantozzi 15		Pts: Floyd 23

Presidente Prudente

21 August 1979
20:00

Boxscore

Italy	79–81	Soviet Union
Scoring by half: 38–36, 41–45
Pts: Costa 16		Pts: Grdzelidze 22

Presidente Prudente

21 August 1979
23:00

Boxscore

Yugoslavia	75–77	Argentina
Scoring by half: 39–42, 36–35
Pts: Čutura 18		Pts: Aréjula 18

Presidente Prudente

22 August 1979
19:00

Boxscore

Brazil	74–73	Argentina
Scoring by half: 36–33, 38–40
Pts: da Silva 19		Pts: Aréjula 21

Presidente Prudente

23 August 1979
19:00

Boxscore

Yugoslavia	88–81	Soviet Union
Scoring by half: 45–53, 43–28
Pts: Čutura 17		Pts: Grdzelidze 21

Presidente Prudente

24 August 1979
19:30

Boxscore

Yugoslavia	74–99	United States
Scoring by half: 37–44, 37–55
Pts: Čutura 24		Pts: Worthy 27

Presidente Prudente

24 August 1979
21:15

Boxscore

Brazil	76–75	Soviet Union
Scoring by half: 45–39, 31–36
Pts: Malvesi 22		Pts: Popov 27

Presidente Prudente

25 August 1979
21:00

Boxscore

Italy	70–71	Argentina
Scoring by half: 38–36, 32–35
Pts: Fantin 21		Pts: Maretto 18

Presidente Prudente

25 August 1979
22:45

Boxscore Boxscore Image

Brazil	55–75	United States
Scoring by half: 22–41, 33–34
Pts: da Silva 25		Pts: Floyd 15

Ginásio de Esportes Antônio Balbino, Salvador
Referees: Marcial Paredes Lopes (PER), Artenik Arabadjian (BUL)

== Final standings ==
Rank	Team	Record
1st place, gold medalist(s)	United States	8–0
2nd place, silver medalist(s)	Brazil	5–3
3rd place, bronze medalist(s)	Argentina	6–2
4th	Yugoslavia	5–3
5th	Soviet Union	4–4
6th	Italy	4–4
7th	Canada	4–4
8th	Uruguay	4–4
9th	Australia	4–4
10th	Philippines	2–6
11th	Panama	2–6
12th	Egypt	0–8

== Awards ==
1979 Under-19 World champions

United States
First title
