= Brazil men's national under-19 basketball team =

- FIBA zone: FIBA Americas
- National federation: Confederação Brasileira de Basketball

U19 World Cup
- Appearances: 9
- Medals: (silver) Silver: 1 (1979); (bronze) Bronze: 1 (1983)

U18 AmeriCup
- Appearances: 12
- Medals: (silver) Silver: 3 (2010, 2012, 2022); (bronze) Bronze: 5 (1990, 1998, 2006, 2016, 2026)

U17 South American Championship
- Appearances: 27
- Medals: (gold) Gold: 11 (1975, 1977, 1979, 1984, 1986, 1992, 1998, 2011, 2019, 2022, 2025); (silver) Silver: 9 (1955, 1972, 1973, 1981, 1988, 1990, 1996, 2000, 2015); (bronze) Bronze: 6 (1982, 1994, 2005, 2009, 2013, 2023)
Home	Away

The Brazil men's national under-17, under-18 and under-19 basketball team is administered by the Brazilian Basketball Confederation (Portuguese: Confederação Brasileira de Basketball), abbreviated as CBB, and represents Brazil in international under-17, under-18 and under-19 basketball competitions.

The team won the 2019 U-17 South American Championship. One of their top players at the event was Gui Carvalho.

== FIBA U17 South American Championship participations ==
Year	Result
1955	2nd place, silver medalist(s)
1972	2nd place, silver medalist(s)
1973	2nd place, silver medalist(s)
1975	1st place, gold medalist(s)
1977	1st place, gold medalist(s)
1979	1st place, gold medalist(s)
1981	2nd place, silver medalist(s)
1982	3rd place, bronze medalist(s)
1984	1st place, gold medalist(s)
1986	1st place, gold medalist(s)
1988	2nd place, silver medalist(s)
1990	2nd place, silver medalist(s)
1992	1st place, gold medalist(s)
1994	3rd place, bronze medalist(s)

Year	Result
1996	2nd place, silver medalist(s)
1998	1st place, gold medalist(s)
2000	2nd place, silver medalist(s)
2005	3rd place, bronze medalist(s)
2007	4th
2009	3rd place, bronze medalist(s)
2011	1st place, gold medalist(s)
2013	3rd place, bronze medalist(s)
2015	2nd place, silver medalist(s)
2019	1st place, gold medalist(s)
2022	1st place, gold medalist(s)
2023	3rd place, bronze medalist(s)
2025	1st place, gold medalist(s)

== FIBA Under-18 AmeriCup participations ==
Year	Result
1990	3rd place, bronze medalist(s)
1994	5th
1998	3rd place, bronze medalist(s)
2002	6th
2006	3rd place, bronze medalist(s)
2010	2nd place, silver medalist(s)

Year	Result
2012	2nd place, silver medalist(s)
2014	6th
2016	3rd place, bronze medalist(s)
2022	2nd place, silver medalist(s)
2024	5th
2026	3rd place, bronze medalist(s)

== FIBA Under-19 Basketball World Cup record ==
Year	Result	Pld	W	L
(Brazil) 1979	2nd place	8	5	3
(Spain) 1983	3rd place	10	6	4
(Italy) 1987	10th place	7	3	4
(Canada) 1991	7th place	8	4	4
(Greece) 1995	Did not qualify			
(Portugal) 1999	8th place	8	3	5
(Greece) 2003	Did not qualify			
(Serbia) 2007	4th place	9	4	5
(New Zealand) 2009	Did not qualify			
(Latvia) 2011	9th place	8	5	3
(Czech Republic) 2013	10th place	8	3	5
(Greece) 2015	Did not qualify			
(Egypt) 2017	Suspended			
(Greece) 2019	Did not participate			
(Latvia) 2021	Insufficient rank in the World Rankings			
(Hungary) 2023	11th place	7	4	3
(Switzerland) 2025	Did not qualify			
(Czech Republic) 2027	Qualified			
(Indonesia) 2029	To be determined			
Total	9/19	73	37	36

== Head coach position ==
- (Brazil) Pablo Costa – 2013–2014

== See also ==
- Brazil men's national basketball team
- Brazil men's national under-17 basketball team
- Brazil women's national under-19 basketball team
- Brazil men's national 3x3 team
