= FIBA Under-19 Basketball World Cup =

International basketball tournament

FIBA U19 Basketball World Cup
- Upcoming season or competition: 2027 FIBA Under-19 Basketball World Cup
- Formerly: FIBA Under-19 World Championship
- Sport: Basketball
- Founded: 1979; 47 years ago
- First season: 1979
- Organizing body: FIBA
- No. of teams: 16
- Continents: All (World)
- Most recent champions: United States (9th title)
- Most titles: United States (9 titles)
- Related competitions: FIBA Under-17 Basketball World Cup
- Website: fiba.basketball/history

The FIBA U19 Basketball World Cup (formerly FIBA Under-19 World Championship) is the under-19 men's world basketball championship organized by the International Basketball Federation (FIBA). From its inauguration in 1979, until 2007, it was held every four years. Since 2007, it has been held biennially.

The reigning world champions are United States, winning the tournament in 2025. The next edition will be held in Czechia in 2027.

== Composition ==
According to the updated FIBA Internal Regulations, the FIBA U19 World Cup shall be held every two years (2023, 2025, 2027, etc.).

Sixteen teams, representing all continents, are eligible to participate in the FIBA U19 World Cup as follows:

- Directly qualified:
  - The host nation (usually designated by the Central Board a year before the scheduled tournament)
- From each continent:
  - Two from FIBA Africa: Finalists of the FIBA U18 AfroBasket
  - Four from FIBA Americas: Semi-finalists of the FIBA U18 AmeriCup
  - Four from FIBA Asia and FIBA Oceania: Semi-finalists of the FIBA U18 Asia Cup
  - Five from FIBA Europe: Semi-finalists and the fifth-placed team of the FIBA U18 EuroBasket

== Summaries ==
Year	Hosts	Final			Third place match		
Year	Hosts	Champions	Score	Runners-up	Third place	Score	Fourth place
1979	(Brazil); Salvador	United States	Round-robin group (Note: A round-robin tournament determined the final standings.)	Brazil	Argentina	Round-robin group	Yugoslavia
1983	(Spain); Palma de Mallorca	United States	82–78	Soviet Union	Brazil	71–66	Spain
1987	(Italy); Bormio	Yugoslavia	86–76	United States	Italy	77–66	West Germany
1991	(Canada); Edmonton	United States	90–85^{OT}	Italy	Argentina	74–71	Yugoslavia
1995	(Greece); Athens	Greece	91–73	Australia	Spain	77–64	Croatia
1999	(Portugal); Lisbon	Spain	94–87	United States	Croatia	66–59	Argentina
2003	(Greece); Thessaloniki	Australia	126–92	Lithuania	Greece	73–64	Croatia
2007	(Serbia); Novi Sad	Serbia	74–69	United States	France	75–67	Brazil
2009	(New Zealand); Auckland	United States	88–80	Greece	Croatia	87–81	Australia
2011	(Latvia); Riga	Lithuania	85–67	Serbia	Russia	77–72	Argentina
2013	(Czech Republic); Prague	United States	82–68	Serbia	Lithuania	106–100	Australia
2015	(Greece); Heraklion	United States	79–71^{OT}	Croatia	Turkey	80–71	Greece
2017	(Egypt); Cairo	Canada	79–60	Italy	United States	96–72	Spain
2019	(Greece); Heraklion	United States	93–79	Mali	France	73–68	Lithuania
2021	(Latvia); Daugavpils–Riga	United States	83–81	France	Canada	101–92	Serbia
2023	(Hungary); Debrecen	Spain	73–69^{OT}	France	Turkey	84–70	United States
2025	(Switzerland); Lausanne	United States	109–76	Germany	Slovenia	91–87	New Zealand
2027	(Czech Republic); Pardubice						
2029	Indonesia						

== Medal table ==
Rank	Nation	Gold	Silver	Bronze	Total
1	United States	9	3	1	13
2	Spain	2	0	1	3
3	Serbia	1	2	0	3
4	Greece	1	1	1	3
4	Lithuania	1	1	1	3
6	Australia	1	1	0	2
7	Canada	1	0	1	2
8	Yugoslavia †	1	0	0	1
9	France	0	2	2	4
10	Italy	0	2	1	3
11	Croatia	0	1	2	3
12	Brazil	0	1	1	2
13	Germany	0	1	0	1
13	Mali	0	1	0	1
13	Soviet Union †	0	1	0	1
16	Argentina	0	0	2	2
16	Turkey	0	0	2	2
18	Russia	0	0	1	1
18	Slovenia	0	0	1	1
Totals (19 entries)		17	17	17	51

== Participation details ==
Team	(Brazil) 1979	(Spain) 1983	(Italy) 1987	(Canada) 1991	(Greece) 1995	(Portugal) 1999	(Greece) 2003	(Serbia) 2007	(New Zealand) 2009	(Latvia) 2011	(Czech Republic) 2013	(Greece) 2015	(Egypt) 2017	(Greece) 2019	(Latvia) 2021	(Hungary) 2023	(Switzerland) 2025	(Czech Republic) 2027	(Indonesia) 2029	Total
Angola	–	13th	–	13th	14th	–	13th	–	14th	–	–	–	13th	–	–	–	–	–		6
Argentina	3rd	7th	–	3rd	6th	4th	10th	6th	5th	4th	12th	10th	8th	11th	8th	5th	12th	–		16
Australia	9th	10th	5th	11th	2nd	5th	1st	5th	4th	6th	4th	7th	–	9th	10th	–	6th	Q		16
Brazil	2nd	3rd	10th	7th	–	8th	–	4th	–	9th	10th	–	–	–	–	11th	–	Q		10
Cameroon	–	–	–	–	–	–	–	–	–	–	–	–	–	–	–	–	14th	–		1
Canada	7th	14th	6th	8th	–	–	–	10th	7th	11th	6th	5th	1st	8th	3rd	7th	5th	Q		15
China	–	11th	9th	10th	9th	15th	14th	12th	–	13th	7th	15th	–	16th	–	10th	13th	Q		14
Chinese Taipei	–	–	11th	–	–	–	–	–	–	14th	–	–	–	–	–	–	–	–		2
Croatia	Part of Yugoslavia				4th	3rd	4th	–	3rd	8th	–	2nd	–	–	–	–	–	–		6
Czech Republic	Part of Czechoslovakia				–	–	–	–	–	–	14th	–	–	–	–	–	–	Q		2
Dominican Republic	–	9th	–	–	–	–	–	–	–	–	–	13th	–	–	–	–	15th	–		3
Egypt	12th	–	–	–	–	13th	–	–	11th	12th	–	11th	12th	–	–	13th	–	–		7
France	–	–	–	–	8th	–	–	3rd	8th	–	–	–	7th	3rd	2nd	2nd	10th	Q		9
Germany	–	5th	4th	–	–	–	–	–	–	–	–	–	5th	–	–	–	2nd	Q		5
Greece	–	–	–	–	1st	7th	3rd	–	2nd	–	–	4th	–	10th	–	–	–	–		6
Hungary	–	–	–	–	–	–	–	–	–	–	–	–	–	–	–	16th	–	–		1
Indonesia	–	–	–	–	–	–	–	–	–	–	–	–	–	–	–	–	–	–	Q	1
Iran	–	–	–	–	–	–	16th	–	15th	–	11th	14th	15th	–	12th	–	–	–		6
Israel	–	–	–	–	–	–	–	–	–	–	–	–	–	–	–	–	7th	–		1
Italy	6th	6th	3rd	2nd	13th	–	–	–	–	–	–	6th	2nd	–	–	–	–	Q		8
Ivory Coast	–	–	–	–	–	–	–	–	–	–	15th	–	–	–	–	–	–	Q		2
Japan	–	–	–	16th	–	14th	–	–	–	–	–	–	10th	–	16th	8th	–	–		5
Jordan	–	–	–	–	16th	–	–	–	–	–	–	–	–	–	–	–	16th	–		2
Kazakhstan	Part of Soviet Union				–	–	–	–	12th	–	–	–	–	–	–	–	–	–		1
Latvia	Part of Soviet Union				–	9th	–	–	–	10th	–	–	–	12th	11th	–	–	–		4
Lebanon	–	–	–	–	–	–	–	14th	–	–	–	–	–	–	–	15th	–	–		2
Lithuania	Part of Soviet Union				5th		2nd	9th	9th	1st	3rd	–	6th	4th	6th	–	–	–		9
Madagascar	–	–	–	–	–	–	–	–	–	–	–	–	–	–	–	14th	–	–		1
Malaysia	–	–	–	–	–	–	15th	–	–	–	–	–	–	–	–	–	–	–		1
Mali	–	–	–	–	–	–	–	15th	–	–	–	–	16th	2nd	13th	–	11th	–		5
New Zealand	–	–	–	–	–	–	–	–	13th	–	–	–	11th	13th	–	–	4th	Q		5
Nigeria	–	–	12th	15th	11th	11th	11th	13th	–	–	–	–	–	–	–	–	–	–		6
Panama	11th	–	–	–	–	–	–	–	–	–	–	–	–	–	–	–	–	–		1
Philippines	10th	–	–	–	–	–	–	–	–	–	–	–	–	14th	–	–	–	–		2
Poland	–	–	–	–	–	–	–	–	–	7th	–	–	–	–	–	–	–	–		1
Portugal	–	–	–	–	–	16th	–	–	–	–	–	–	–	–	–	–	–	–		1
Puerto Rico	–	–	8th	–	10th	–	6th	16th	6th	–	–	–	9th	6th	14th	–	–	Q		9
Qatar	–	–	–	–	–	10th	–	–	–	–	–	–	–	–	–	–	–	–		1
Romania	–	–	–	5th	–	–	–	–	–	–	–	–	–	–	–	–	–	–		1
Russia	Part of Soviet Union				–	6th	–	–	–	3rd	9th	–	–	5th	–	–	–	–		4
Senegal	–	–	–	–	–	–	–	–	–	–	16th	–	–	15th	7th	–	–	Q		4
Serbia	Part of Yugoslavia				–	–	–	1st	–	2nd	2nd	9th	–	7th	4th	6th	9th	–		8
Slovenia	Part of Yugoslavia				–	–	7th	–	–	–	–	–	–	–	–	9th	3rd	Q		4
South Korea	–	–	–	–	15th	–	12th	11th	–	15th	13th	12th	14th	–	15th	12th	–	Q		10
Soviet Union †	5th	2nd	7th	9th	defunct															4
Spain	–	4th	–	6th	3rd	1st	–	8th	10th	–	5th	8th	4th	–	5th	1st	–	Q		12
Switzerland	–	–	–	–	–	–	–	–	–	–	–	–	–	–	–	–	8th	–		1
Syria	–	–	–	12th	–	–	–	–	16th	–	–	–	–	–	–	–	–	–		2
Tunisia	–	–	–	–	–	–	–	–	–	16th	–	16th	–	–	–	–	–	–		2
Turkey	–	–	–	–	–	–	8th	7th	–	–	–	3rd	–	–	9th	3rd	–	–		5
United States	1st	1st	2nd	1st	7th	2nd	5th	2nd	1st	5th	1st	1st	3rd	1st	1st	4th	1st	Q		18
Uruguay	8th	12th	–	14th	–	–	–	–	–	–	–	–	–	–	–	–	–	–		3
Venezuela	–	–	–	–	12th	12th	9th	–	–	–	–	–	–	–	–	–	–	–		3
Yugoslavia †	4th	8th	1st	4th	defunct															4
Total	12	14	12	16	16	16	16	16	16	16	16	16	16	16	16	16	16	16	16	

== Tournament awards ==
=== Most recent award winners (2025) ===
Award	Winner	Position	Team
Most Valuable Player	AJ Dybantsa	PF	United States
Defensive Most Valuable Player	Jordan Smith Jr.	PG	United States
All-Tournament Team	Christian Anderson Jr.	PG	Germany
All-Tournament Team	Mikel Brown Jr.	PG	United States
All-Tournament Team	Žak Smrekar	SF	Slovenia
All-Tournament Team	AJ Dybantsa	PF	United States
All-Tournament Team	Hannes Steinbach	C	Germany

== Debut of national teams ==
Year	Debutants
1979	Argentina, Australia, Brazil, Canada, Egypt, Italy, Panama; Philippines, Soviet Union, United States, Uruguay, Yugoslavia
1983	Angola, China, Dominican Republic, Germany, Spain
1987	Chinese Taipei, Nigeria, Puerto Rico
1991	Japan, Romania, Syria
1995	Croatia, France, Jordan, Lithuania, South Korea, Venezuela
1999	Latvia, Portugal, Qatar, Russia
2003	Iran, Malaysia, Slovenia, Turkey
2007	Lebanon, Mali, Serbia
2009	Kazakhstan, New Zealand
2011	Poland, Tunisia
2013	Czech Republic, Ivory Coast, Senegal
2015	None
2017	None
2019	None
2021	None
2023	Hungary, Madagascar
2025	Cameroon, Israel, Switzerland
2027	None
2029	Indonesia

== See also ==
- FIBA Under-17 Basketball World Cup
- FIBA Under-17 Women's Basketball World Cup
- FIBA Under-19 Women's Basketball World Cup
