= 2025 BBL Playoffs =

German basketball postseason

Tournament details
- Country: Germany
- Dates: 17 May – 26 June
- Teams: 10

Final positions
- Champions: Bayern Munich
- Runners-up: Ratiopharm Ulm
- Semifinalists: MLP Academics Heidelberg; FIT/One Würzburg Baskets

The 2025 BBL Playoffs was the concluding postseason of the 2024–25 Basketball Bundesliga season. The playoffs started on 17 May and end on 26 June 2025.

== Playoff qualifying ==
Seed	Team	Record	Clinched			
Seed	Team	Record	Play-in berth	Playoff berth	Seeded team	Top seed
1	Bayern Munich	24–8	27 April	27 April	27 April	11 May
2	Ratiopharm Ulm	23–9	3 May	3 May	3 May	
3	Basketball Löwen Braunschweig	20–12		8 May	8 May	
4	Niners Chemnitz	18–14		11 May	11 May	
5	MLP Academics Heidelberg	18–14		11 May		
6	FIT/One Würzburg Baskets	18–14		11 May		
†	Alba Berlin	18–14	11 May			
†	Mitteldeutscher BC	17–15	11 May			
†	Baskets Oldenburg	16–16	11 May			
†	Rostock Seawolves	16–16	11 May			

† Teams ranked 7 through 10 will participate in the play-in tournament to determine seeds 7 and 8.

== Play-in tournament ==
Only the top six seeds advanced directly to the playoffs, while the next four seeds participated in a play-in tournament. The seventh place team hosted the eighth place team in the double-chance round needing to win one game to advance, with the winner clinching the seventh seed in the playoffs. The ninth place team hosted the tenth place team in the elimination round requiring two wins to advance, with the loser being eliminated from the competition. The loser in the double-chance round hosted the elimination-round game-winner, with the winner clinching the eighth seed and the loser being eliminated. The games were played on 11 and 13 May 2025.

Play-in games
7	Alba Berlin	81
8	Mitteldeutscher BC	78
9	Baskets Oldenburg	95
10	Rostock Seawolves	83

No. 8 seed game
8	Mitteldeutscher BC	110
9	Baskets Oldenburg	95

Final seeds
7	Alba Berlin	No. 7 seed
8	Mitteldeutscher BC	No. 8 seed

Bold Game winner

=== Seed 9 vs Seed 10 ===
13 May 2025
18:30

Boxscore

Baskets Oldenburg	95–83	Rostock Seawolves
Scoring by quarter: 21–27, 24–18, 23–13, 27–25
Pts: Justin Jaworski 40; Rebs: Norris Agbakoko 9 Asts: Justin Jaworski 5		Pts: Bryce Hamilton 45; Rebs: Bryce Hamilton 7 Asts: Hamilton, Lewis 7

Große EWE Arena, Oldenburg
Attendance: 6,200
Referees: Martin Matip, Carsten Straube, Christof Madinger

=== Seed 7 vs Seed 8 ===
13 May 2025
20:00

Boxscore

Alba Berlin	81–78	Mitteldeutscher BC
Scoring by quarter: 21–19, 22–13, 18–20, 20–26
Pts: Malte Delow 18; Rebs: Justin Bean 8 Asts: Martin Hermannsson 5		Pts: Spencer Reaves 21; Rebs: Eddy Edigin 8 Asts: Michael Devoe 6

Uber Arena, Berlin
Attendance: 5,891
Referees: Robert Lottermoser, Kristap Konstantinovs, Christian Theis

=== Loser Game 1 vs Winner Game 2 ===
15 May 2025
20:00

Boxscore

Mitteldeutscher BC	110–95	Baskets Oldenburg
Scoring by quarter: 23–27, 28–15, 27–18, 32–35
Pts: Charles Callison 29; Rebs: Eddy Edigin 6 Asts: Michael Devoe 11		Pts: Seth Hinrichs 23; Rebs: Agbakoko, Schoormann 8 Asts: Len Schoormann 7

Stadthalle Weißenfels, Weißenfels
Attendance: 2,100
Referees: Anne Panther, Gentian Cici, Benjamin Barth

== Bracket ==
The rounds were played in a best-of-five format.

Quarterfinals
1	Bayern Munich	3
8	Mitteldeutscher BC	0
4	Niners Chemnitz	1
5	MLP Academics Heidelberg	3
2	Ratiopharm Ulm	3
7	Alba Berlin	0
3	Basketball Löwen Braunschweig	2
6	FIT/One Würzburg Baskets	3

Semifinals
1	Bayern Munich	3
5	MLP Academics Heidelberg	1
2	Ratiopharm Ulm	3
6	FIT/One Würzburg Baskets	2

Finals
1	Bayern Munich	3
2	Ratiopharm Ulm	2

== Quarterfinals ==
The quarterfinals were held from 17 to 29 May 2025 in a best-of-five format.

=== Bayern Munich vs Mitteldeutscher BC ===
17 May 2025
20:00

Boxscore

Bayern Munich	78–60	Mitteldeutscher BC
Scoring by quarter: 20–17, 21–10, 15–13, 22–20
Pts: Shabazz Napier 12; Rebs: Vladimir Lučić 12; Asts: Justus Hollatz 7		Pts: Michael Devoe 17; Rebs: Eddy Edigin 9 Asts: Charles Callison 3
Munich leads series 1–0

SAP Garden, Munich
Attendance: 11,200
Referees: Robert Lottermoser, Clemens Fritz, Adrian Ambrosio

20 May 2025
18:30

Boxscore

Mitteldeutscher BC	65–80	Bayern Munich
Scoring by quarter: 19–16, 13–22, 13–21, 20–21
Pts: Michael Devoe 17; Rebs: Ty Brewer 9 Asts: Charles Callison 5		Pts: Obst, Voigtmann 15; Rebs: Giffey, Weiler-Babb 6 Asts: Andreas Obst 6
Munich leads series 2–0

Stadthalle Weißenfels, Weißenfels
Attendance: 3,000
Referees: Martin Matip, Steve Bittner, Nermin Hodzic

24 May 2025
16:30

Boxscore

Bayern Munich	80–69	Mitteldeutscher BC
Scoring by quarter: 22–21, 20–19, 25–15, 13–14
Pts: Vladimir Lučić 19; Rebs: Devin Booker 9 Asts: Shabazz Napier 6		Pts: Charles Callison 17; Rebs: Ty Brewer 10; Asts: Devoe, Reaves 4
Munich wins series 3–0

SAP Garden, Munich
Attendance: 11,200
Referees: Gentian Cici, Christof Madinger, Johannes Hack

=== Ratiopharm Ulm vs Alba Berlin ===
17 May 2025
18:30

Boxscore

Ratiopharm Ulm	94–83	Alba Berlin
Scoring by quarter: 20–27, 25–13, 30–22, 19–21
Pts: Noa Essengue 21; Rebs: Philipp Herkenhoff 5 Asts: Justinian Jessup 4		Pts: Malte Delow 16; Rebs: Malte Delow 8 Asts: Martin Hermannsson 4
Ulm leads series 1–0

Arena Ulm/Neu-Ulm, Ulm
Attendance: 6,000
Referees: Carsten Straube, Kristap Konstantinovs, Dennis Sirowi

21 May 2025
20:00

Boxscore

Alba Berlin	62–74	Ratiopharm Ulm
Scoring by quarter: 18–22, 9–25, 13–14, 22–13
Pts: three players 12; Rebs: Justin Bean 9 Asts: Martin Hermannsson 5		Pts: Ben Saraf 15; Rebs: Essengue, Herkenhoff 6 Asts: Noa Essengue 4
Ulm leads series 2–0

Uber Arena, Berlin
Attendance: 8,182
Referees: Anne Panther, Gentian Cici, Adrian Ambrosio

24 May 2025
18:00

Boxscore

Ratiopharm Ulm	93–84	Alba Berlin
Scoring by quarter: 20–24, 23–21, 19–22, 31–17
Pts: Márcio Santos 23; Rebs: Noa Essengue 7 Asts: Ben Saraf 7		Pts: Martin Hermannsson 20; Rebs: Yanni Wetzell 6 Asts: Justin Bean 4
Ulm wins series 3–0

Arena Ulm/Neu-Ulm, Ulm
Attendance: 6,000
Referees: Martin Matip, Steve Bittner, Clemens Fritz

=== Basketball Löwen Braunschweig vs FIT/One Würzburg Baskets ===
18 May 2025
16:30

Boxscore

Basketball Löwen Braunschweig	82–79	FIT/One Würzburg Baskets
Scoring by quarter: 30–15, 21–24, 25–18, 16–22
Pts: T.J. Crockett 24; Rebs: Sananda Fru 9 Asts: Arnas Velička 5		Pts: Jackson, Steinbach 14; Rebs: Hannes Steinbach 6 Asts: Mike Lewis II 4
Braunschweig leads series 1–0

Volkswagen Halle, Braunschweig
Attendance: 4,494
Referees: Martin Matip, Zulfikar Oruzgani, Nermin Hodzic

21 May 2025
18:30

Boxscore

FIT/One Würzburg Baskets	94–90	Basketball Löwen Braunschweig
Scoring by quarter: 24–21, 25–26, 20–18, 25–25
Pts: Zac Seljaas 27; Rebs: Hannes Steinbach 11; Asts: Jhivvan Jackson 6		Pts: Arnas Velička 21; Rebs: Luka Ščuka 10; Asts: Arnas Velička 5
Series tied, 1–1

s.Oliver Arena, Würzburg
Attendance: 3,140
Referees: Benjamin Barth, Christof Madinger, Steve Bittner

25 May 2025
15:00

Boxscore

Basketball Löwen Braunschweig	80–75	FIT/One Würzburg Baskets
Scoring by quarter: 13–16, 24–19, 19–22, 24–18
Pts: Arnas Velička 23; Rebs: Sananda Fru 13; Asts: Arnas Velička 5		Pts: Hannes Steinbach 17; Rebs: Hannes Steinbach 8 Asts: Mintz, Wank 3
Braunschweig leads series 2–1

Volkswagen Halle, Braunschweig
Attendance: 6,358
Referees: Anne Panther, Christian Theis, Adrian Ambrosio

27 May 2025
20:00

Boxscore

FIT/One Würzburg Baskets	79–72	Basketball Löwen Braunschweig
Scoring by quarter: 28–21, 16–13, 17–21, 18–17
Pts: Zac Seljaas 17; Rebs: Hannes Steinbach 14; Asts: Jhivvan Jackson 5		Pts: T.J. Crockett 16; Rebs: three players 6 Asts: Arnas Velička 4
Series tied, 2–2

s.Oliver Arena, Würzburg
Attendance: 3,140
Referees: Robert Lottermoser, Gentian Cici, Benjamin Barth

29 May 2025
15:00

Boxscore

Basketball Löwen Braunschweig	88–97 (OT)	FIT/One Würzburg Baskets
Scoring by quarter: 10–23, 17–22, 29–15, 21–17, Overtime: 11–20
Pts: Sananda Fru 21; Rebs: Sananda Fru 15; Asts: Arnas Velička 6		Pts: Zac Seljaas 24; Rebs: Hannes Steinbach 10; Asts: Jhivvan Jackson 4
Würzburg wins series 3–2

Volkswagen Halle, Braunschweig
Attendance: 5,987
Referees: Robert Lottermoser, Anne Panther, Martin Matip

=== Niners Chemnitz vs MLP Academics Heidelberg ===
17 May 2025
17:00

Boxscore

Niners Chemnitz	90–93	MLP Academics Heidelberg
Scoring by quarter: 20–29, 24–17, 24–27, 22–20
Pts: Victor Bailey 27; Rebs: Kevin Yebo 6 Asts: Jacob Gilyard 8		Pts: Michael Weathers 21; Rebs: Bakary Dibba 10; Asts: Michael Weathers 6
Heidelberg leads series 1–0

Chemnitz Arena, Chemnitz
Attendance: 4,496
Referees: Anne Panther, Christian Theis, Johannes Hack

20 May 2025
20:00

Boxscore

MLP Academics Heidelberg	74–70	Niners Chemnitz
Scoring by quarter: 19–15, 17–18, 20–18, 18–19
Pts: Ryan Mikesell 19; Rebs: Bakary Dibba 8 Asts: three players 3		Pts: Victor Bailey 21; Rebs: Olivier Nkamhoua 8 Asts: DeAndre Lansdowne 4
Heidelberg leads series 2–0

SNP Dome, Heidelberg
Attendance: 4,494
Referees: Robert Lottermoser, Clemens Fritz, Johannes Hack

25 May 2025
16:30

Boxscore

Niners Chemnitz	97–88	MLP Academics Heidelberg
Scoring by quarter: 23–21, 36–19, 14–24, 24–24
Pts: Jacob Gilyard 27; Rebs: Jeff Garrett 10; Asts: DeAndre Lansdowne 9		Pts: Michael Weathers 24; Rebs: Ryan Mikesell 7 Asts: Horne, Zipser 3
Heidelberg leads series 2–1

Chemnitz Arena, Chemnitz
Attendance: 4,978
Referees: Benjamin Barth, Zulfikar Oruzgani, Nermin Hodzic

27 May 2025
18:30

Boxscore

MLP Academics Heidelberg	92–64	Niners Chemnitz
Scoring by quarter: 26–23, 22–18, 19–7, 25–16
Pts: Michael Weathers 24; Rebs: Paul Zipser 11; Asts: three players 4		Pts: Kevin Yebo 12; Rebs: Jeff Garrett 6 Asts: DeAndre Lansdowne 4
Heidelberg wins series 3–1

SNP Dome, Heidelberg
Attendance: 4,428
Referees: Anne Panther, Martin Matip, Steve Bittner

== Semifinals ==
The semifinals were held from 1 to 12 June 2025 in a best-of-five format.

=== Bayern Munich vs MLP Academics Heidelberg ===
1 June 2025
16:30

Boxscore

Bayern Munich	90–95	MLP Academics Heidelberg
Scoring by quarter: 23–23, 25–22, 17–19, 25–31
Pts: Vladimir Lučić 22; Rebs: Vladimir Lučić 7 Asts: Nick Weiler-Babb 7		Pts: DJ Horne 26; Rebs: Marcel Keßen 11; Asts: Michael Weathers 5
Heidelberg leads series 1–0

SAP Garden, Munich
Attendance: 11,500
Referees: Martin Matip, Clemens Fritz, Zulfikar Oruzgani

4 June 2025
20:00

Boxscore

MLP Academics Heidelberg	61–90	Bayern Munich
Scoring by quarter: 16–17, 17–20, 12–28, 16–25
Pts: Michael Weathers 17; Rebs: Dibba, Keßen 8 Asts: Bakary Dibba 3		Pts: Shabazz Napier 16; Rebs: Vladimir Lučić 6 Asts: Nick Weiler-Babb 7
Series tied, 1–1

SNP Dome, Heidelberg
Attendance: 4,568
Referees: Gentian Cici, Christian Theis, Nermin Hodzic

7 June 2025
20:00

Boxscore

Bayern Munich	98–68	MLP Academics Heidelberg
Scoring by quarter: 24–15, 21–25, 24–16, 29–12
Pts: Shabazz Napier 18; Rebs: Vladimir Lučić 8 Asts: Nick Weiler-Babb 8		Pts: Horne, Weathers 16; Rebs: Paul Zipser 8 Asts: Horne, Weathers 2
Munich leads series 2–1

SAP Garden, Munich
Attendance: 11,500
Referees: Anne Panther, Clemens Fritz, Christian Theis

10 June 2025
20:00

Boxscore

MLP Academics Heidelberg	82–94 (OT)	Bayern Munich
Scoring by quarter: 28–14, 13–22, 21–22, 17–21, Overtime: 3–15
Pts: DJ Horne 17; Rebs: Ryan Mikesell 12; Asts: Michael Weathers 7		Pts: Napier, Obst 19; Rebs: Vladimir Lučić 12; Asts: Nick Weiler-Babb 4
Munich wins series 3–1

SNP Dome, Heidelberg
Attendance: 4,568
Referees: Robert Lottermoser, Gentian Cici, Steve Bittner

=== Ratiopharm Ulm vs FIT/One Würzburg Baskets ===
1 June 2025
18:00

Boxscore

Ratiopharm Ulm	91–87 (OT)	FIT/One Würzburg Baskets
Scoring by quarter: 24–16, 21–21, 19–19, 9–17, Overtime: 18–14
Pts: Noa Essengue 22; Rebs: Noa Essengue 14; Asts: Ben Saraf 6		Pts: Mike Lewis II 21; Rebs: Hannes Steinbach 18; Asts: three players 2
Ulm leads series 1–0

Arena Ulm/Neu-Ulm, Neu-Ulm
Attendance: 6,000
Referees: Robert Lottermoser, Benjamin Barth, Johannes Hack

4 June 2025
18:30

Boxscore

FIT/One Würzburg Baskets	87–77	Ratiopharm Ulm
Scoring by quarter: 20–20, 26–17, 20–20, 21–20
Pts: Davion Mintz 21; Rebs: Hannes Steinbach 10; Asts: Jhivvan Jackson 4		Pts: Márcio Santos 15; Rebs: Noa Essengue 8 Asts: Ben Saraf 4
Series tied, 1–1

s.Oliver Arena, Würzburg
Attendance: 3,140
Referees: Anne Panther, Christof Madinger, Steve Bittner

7 June 2025
18:30

Boxscore

Ratiopharm Ulm	99–86	FIT/One Würzburg Baskets
Scoring by quarter: 17–20, 31–17, 20–18, 31–31
Pts: Karim Jallow 26; Rebs: Noa Essengue 9 Asts: Jessup, Plummer 3		Pts: Jhivvan Jackson 25; Rebs: Hannes Steinbach 10; Asts: Mike Lewis II 5
Ulm leads series 2–1

Arena Ulm/Neu-Ulm, Neu-Ulm
Attendance: 6,000
Referees: Martin Matip, Gentian Cici, Zulfikar Oruzgani

10 June 2025
18:30

Boxscore

FIT/One Würzburg Baskets	78–77	Ratiopharm Ulm
Scoring by quarter: 25–23, 19–18, 19–22, 15–14
Pts: Seljaas, Steinbach 16; Rebs: Hannes Steinbach 7 Asts: Davion Mintz 5		Pts: Karim Jallow 20; Rebs: Karim Jallow 12; Asts: Santos, Saraf 3
Series tied, 2–2

s.Oliver Arena, Würzburg
Attendance: 3,140
Referees: Anne Panther, Martin Matip, Nermin Hodzic

12 June 2025
20:00

Boxscore

Ratiopharm Ulm	91–84	FIT/One Würzburg Baskets
Scoring by quarter: 26–17, 24–26, 16–15, 25–26
Pts: Karim Jallow 18; Rebs: Karim Jallow 9 Asts: Ben Saraf 4		Pts: three players 16; Rebs: Hannes Steinbach 9 Asts: Jackson, Mintz 5
Ulm wins series 3–2

Arena Ulm/Neu-Ulm, Ulm
Attendance: 6,000
Referees: Anne Panther, Martin Matip, Gentian Cici

== Final ==
The final was held from 15 to 26 June 2025 in a best-of-five format.

15 June 2025
18:00

Boxscore

Bayern Munich	82–66	Ratiopharm Ulm
Scoring by quarter: 19–19, 18–17, 17–16, 28–14
Pts: Napier, Obst 20; Rebs: Vladimir Lučić 11; Asts: Nick Weiler-Babb 8		Pts: Justinian Jessup 22; Rebs: Tobias Jensen 6 Asts: four players 2
Munich leads series 1–0

SAP Garden, Munich
Attendance: 11,500
Referees: Robert Lottermoser, Martin Matip, Christian Theis

18 June 2025
20:00

Boxscore

Ratiopharm Ulm	79–64	Bayern Munich
Scoring by quarter: 21–22, 14–15, 21–7, 23–20
Pts: Karim Jallow 23; Rebs: Jallow, Santos 6 Asts: Ben Saraf 4		Pts: Vladimir Lučić 17; Rebs: Jack White 8 Asts: Jack White 3
Series tied, 1–1

Arena Ulm/Neu-Ulm, Neu-Ulm
Attendance: 6,000
Referees: Anne Panther, Gentian Cici, Steve Bittner

21 June 2025
20:00

Boxscore

Bayern Munich	79–81	Ratiopharm Ulm
Scoring by quarter: 20–17, 22–20, 20–22, 17–22
Pts: Niels Giffey 16; Rebs: Nick Weiler-Babb 5 Asts: Voigtmann, Weiler-Babb 5		Pts: Justinian Jessup 22; Rebs: Philipp Herkenhoff 6 Asts: Ben Saraf 4
Ulm leads series 2–1

SAP Garden, Munich
Attendance: 11,500
Referees: Robert Lottermoser, Gentian Cici, Zulfikar Oruzgani

24 June 2025
20:00

Boxscore

Ratiopharm Ulm	53–67	Bayern Munich
Scoring by quarter: 13–19, 19–13, 12–17, 9–18
Pts: Nelson Weidemann 13; Rebs: Herkenhoff, Jessup 6 Asts: Nelson Weidemann 2		Pts: Shabazz Napier 15; Rebs: Hollatz, Obst 6 Asts: Hollatz, Weiler-Babb 4
Series tied, 2–2

Arena Ulm/Neu-Ulm, Neu-Ulm
Attendance: 6,000
Referees: Anne Panther, Martin Matip, Christian Theis

26 June 2025
20:00

Boxscore

Bayern Munich	81–77	Ratiopharm Ulm
Scoring by quarter: 28–21, 20–20, 17–20, 16–16
Pts: Shabazz Napier 15; Rebs: Voigtmann, Weiler-Babb 6 Asts: Weiler-Babb 9		Pts: Karim Jallow 22; Rebs: Karim Jallow 13; Asts: Tobias Jensen 5
Munich wins series 3–2

SAP Garden, Munich
Attendance: 11,500
Referees: Robert Lottermoser, Anne Panther, Martin Matip
