= 2024–25 BBL-Pokal =

- Dates: 14 September 2024 – 16 February 2025
- Games played: 23
- Teams: 24

Regular season
- Season MVP: Michael Devoe

Finals
- Champions: Mitteldeutscher BC
- Runners-up: Bamberg Baskets

The 2024–25 BBL-Pokal was the 58th season of the BBL-Pokal, the domestic cup competition of the Basketball Bundesliga (BBL, running from 14 September 2024 to 16 February 2025.

Mitteldeutscher BC defeated Bamberg Baskets in the final to win their first title.

== Format ==
The top eight teams of the 2023–24 Basketball Bundesliga received a bye and move on to the round of 16. The teams that placed ninth to 16th were seeded and the two relegated teams, together with the top six-placed teams from the ProA from the previous season, were unseeded for the draw. The team from the unseeded group had home-advantage. After that an open draw was used for the other rounds.

== Schedule ==
The rounds of the 2024–25 competition were as follows:

| Round | Matches |
|---|---|
| First round | 13–15 September 2024 |
| Round of 16 | 11–13 October 2024 |
| Quarterfinals | 7–9 December 2024 |
| Final four | 15–16 February 2025 |

== First round ==
The draw took place on 25 July 2024. The games took place between 13 and 15 September 2023.

13 September 2024
20:00

Boxscore

| Gladiators Treves | 68–71 | Skyliners Frankfurt |
Scoring by quarter: 19–11, 15–21, 17–20, 17–19
| Pts: Behnam Yakhchali 14; Rebs: Nolan Adekunle 7 Asts: Marcus Graves 4 | | Pts: Trey Calvin 21; Rebs: David Muenkat 13; Asts: Booker Coplin 3 |

Trier Arena, Trier
Attendance: 3,567
Referees: Martin Matip, Johannes Hack, Danjana Rey

14 September 2024
18:30

Boxscore

| Tigers Tübingen | 73–91 | Baskets Oldenburg |
Scoring by quarter: 19–17, 19–27, 11–24, 14–23
| Pts: Kenneth Cooper 23; Rebs: Samuel Idowu 5 Asts: Hecker, Tention 4 | | Pts: Geno Crandall 22; Rebs: Len Schoormann 8 Asts: Brooks, Crandall 4 |

Paul Horn-Arena, Tübingen
Attendance: 1,504
Referees: Carsten Straube, Armin Mutapčić, Alexandra Pawlik

14 September 2024
18:30

Boxscore

| Crailsheim Merlins | 79–77 | Rostock Seawolves |
Scoring by quarter: 25–18, 21–21, 15–19, 18–19
| Pts: Devon Goodman 18; Rebs: Anthony Gaines 11; Asts: Devon Goodman 3 | | Pts: D'Shawn Schwartz 14; Rebs: Amaize, Šķēle 5 Asts: Aigars Šķēle 4 |

Arena Hohenlohe, Crailsheim
Attendance: 2,027
Referees: Benjamin Barth, Tamer Arik, Adrián Iglesias

14 September 2024
20:00

Boxscore

| Giessen 46ers | 77–103 | Mitteldeutscher BC |
Scoring by quarter: 26–19, 16–32, 16–25, 19–27
| Pts: Kyle Castlin 19; Rebs: Šimon Krajčovič 5 Asts: Šimon Krajčovič 5 | | Pts: Tyren Johnson 30; Rebs: Devoe, Tkachenko 6 Asts: Michael Devoe 7 |

Sporthalle Gießen-Ost, Gießen
Attendance: 1,832
Referees: Anne Panther, Christian Theis, Sascha Gilbert

14 September 2024
20:00

Boxscore

| Karlsruhe Lions | 57–78 | Bamberg Baskets |
Scoring by quarter: 17–14, 15–23, 13–25, 12–16
| Pts: Lachlan Dent 13; Rebs: Lukas Herzog 8 Asts: Lachlan Dent 5 | | Pts: Moritz Krimmer 16; Rebs: KeyShawn Feazell 7 Asts: Kyle Lofton 3 |

Lina-Radke-Hall, Karlsruhe
Referees: Enrico Streit, Andreas Bohn, Kristaps Konstantinovs

15 September 2024
15:00

Boxscore

| USC Heidelberg | 96–89 | Hamburg Towers |
Scoring by quarter: 21–24, 21–12, 24–27, 30–26
| Pts: Ryan Mikesell 25; Rebs: Ryan Mikesell 9 Asts: Alex Barcello 7 | | Pts: Jaizec Lottie 25; Rebs: Kur Kuath 9 Asts: Lottie, Rich 3 |

SNP Dome, Heidelberg
Attendance: 2,615
Referees: Christof Madinger, Clemens Fritz, Nicolas Brendel

15 September 2024
15:00

Boxscore

| Phoenix Hagen | 80–83 | BG Göttingen |
Scoring by quarter: 19–23, 22–20, 11–19, 28–21
| Pts: Sincere Carry 19; Rebs: Lennart Boner 8 Asts: Sincere Carry 6 | | Pts: Demajeo Wiggins 23; Rebs: Demajeo Wiggins 8 Asts: Jarred Godfrey 4 |

Krollmann Arena, Hagen
Attendance: 2,319
Referees: Gentian Cici, Martin Matip, Radeesh Kattur

15 September 2024
16:30

Boxscore

| Medipolis SC Jena | 70–80 | Basketball Löwen Braunschweig |
Scoring by quarter: 14–22, 15–20, 16–19, 25–19
| Pts: Zach Cooks 20; Rebs: Bank, Christen 7 Asts: Zach Cooks 3 | | Pts: Luke Scuka 15; Rebs: Schilling, Zylka 6 Asts: Arnas Velička 8 |

Sparkassen-Arena, Jena
Attendance: 2,214
Referees: Robert Lottermoser, Steve Bittner, Nermin Hodzic

== Round of 16 ==
The draw took place on 25 July 2024. The games took place between 11 and 13 October 2023.

11 October 2024
20:00

Boxscore

| BG Göttingen | 86–78 | Würzburg Baskets |
Scoring by quarter: 23–18, 17–18, 17–23, 29–19
| Pts: Kostja Mushidi 20; Rebs: Zachary Ensminger 8 Asts: Zachary Ensminger 5 | | Pts: Jhivvan Jackson 20; Rebs: Zac Seljaas 10; Asts: Jhivvan Jackson 5 |

Sparkassen Arena, Göttingen
Attendance: 2,107
Referees: Carsten Straube, Dennis Sirowi, Sascha Alan Gilbert

12 October 2024
16:30

Boxscore

| Skyliners Frankfurt | 85–79 | Baskets Oldenburg |
Scoring by quarter: 19–16, 24–10, 21–16, 21–37
| Pts: Malik Parsons 24; Rebs: Einaras Tubutis 8 Asts: Booker Coplin 6 | | Pts: Justin Jaworski 29; Rebs: Artur Konontšuk 7 Asts: Eli Brooks 4 |

Süwag Energie ARENA, Frankfurt
Attendance: 1,800
Referees: Clemens Fritz, Johannes Hack, Andreas Bohn

12 October 2024
18:30

Boxscore

| Bamberg Baskets | 103–100 | ratiopharm Ulm |
Scoring by quarter: 21–31, 25–20, 25–18, 32–31
| Pts: Kyle Lofton 25; Rebs: KeyShawn Feazell 7 Asts: Ronaldo Segu 6 | | Pts: Alfonso Plummer 23; Rebs: Isaiah Roby 6 Asts: Justinian Jessup 6 |

Brose Arena, Bamberg
Attendance: 3,826
Referees: Christof Madinger, Enrico Streit, Danjana Rey

12 October 2024
20:00

Boxscore

| Basketball Löwen Braunschweig | 68–89 | Rasta Vechta |
Scoring by quarter: 16–26, 20–22, 17–21, 15–20
| Pts: Arnas Velička 15; Rebs: Luka Ščuka 8 Asts: Arnas Velička 6 | | Pts: Joel Aminu 25; Rebs: Lloyd Pandi 7 Asts: Tyger Campbell 6 |

Volkswagen Halle, Braunschweig
Attendance: 2,363
Referees: Steve Bittner, Oliver Krause, Anne Panther

13 October 2024
15:00

Boxscore

| USC Heidelberg | 78–73 | Niners Chemnitz |
Scoring by quarter: 19–10, 23–25, 15–15, 21–23
| Pts: Ryan Mikesell 29; Rebs: Ryan Mikesell 6 Asts: Ryan Mikesell 6 | | Pts: Victor Bailey 22; Rebs: Olivier Nkamhoua 7 Asts: DeAndre Lansdowne 6 |

SNP Dome, Heidelberg
Attendance: 2,760
Referees: Robert Lottermoser, Moritz Krüper, Nermin Hodzic

13 October 2024
16:30

Boxscore

| Crailsheim Merlins | 74–75 | Alba Berlin |
Scoring by quarter: 26–17, 17–11, 19–22, 12–25
| Pts: Vincent Shahid 15; Rebs: Gaines, Griffin 6 Asts: Gaines, Shahid 4 | | Pts: Matteo Spagnolo 16; Rebs: Bean, Williams 8 Asts: Martin Hermannsson 5 |

Arena Hohenlohe, Crailsheim
Referees: Benjamin Barth, Armin Mutapčić, Nicolas Rotter

13 October 2024
16:30

Boxscore

| Riesen Ludwigsburg | 77–85 | Mitteldeutscher BC |
Scoring by quarter: 22–10, 21–29, 17–20, 17–26
| Pts: Joel Scott 23; Rebs: Joel Scott 8 Asts: Ezra Mañjon 6 | | Pts: Michael Devoe 20; Rebs: Brewer, Johnson 6 Asts: Charles Callison 4 |

Arena Ludwigsburg, Ludwigsburg
Attendance: 2,971
Referees: Gentian Cici, Kristaps Konstantinovs, Tamer Arik

13 October 2024
18:00

Boxscore

| Telekom Baskets Bonn | 85–91 | Bayern Munich |
Scoring by quarter: 26–19, 20–22, 15–29, 24–21
| Pts: Darius McGhee 24; Rebs: Angelo Allegri 7 Asts: Darius McGhee 6 | | Pts: Carsen Edwards 23; Rebs: Devin Booker 7 Asts: Vladimir Lučić 6 |

Telekom Dome, Bonn
Attendance: 6,000
Referees: Anne Panther, Christian Theis, Nicolas Brendel

== Quarterfinals ==
The draw took place on 13 October 2024. The games took place between 7 and 9 December 2024.

7 December 2024
18:30

Boxscore

| Mitteldeutscher BC | 100–85 | USC Heidelberg |
Scoring by quarter: 34–18, 21–17, 29–27, 16–23
| Pts: Spencer Reaves 36; Rebs: John Bryant 5 Asts: Callison, Devoe 5 | | Pts: Ryan Mikesell 21; Rebs: Osun Osunniyi 7 Asts: Ryan Mikesell 5 |

Stadthalle Weißenfels, Weißenfels
Attendance: 2,800
Referees: Anne Panther, Steve Bittner, Johannes Hack

7 December 2024
20:00

Boxscore

| BG Göttingen | 67–78 | Skyliners Frankfurt |
Scoring by quarter: 18–17, 18–20, 13–19, 18–22
| Pts: Tra Holder 18; Rebs: Collin Welp 7 Asts: Zachary Ensminger 3 | | Pts: Trey Calvin 23; Rebs: Booker Coplin 10; Asts: Calvin, Parsons 4 |

Sparkassen Arena, Göttingen
Attendance: 3,190
Referees: Martin Matip, Zulfikar Oruzgani, Clemens Fritz

8 December 2024
18:00

Boxscore

| Bamberg Baskets | 80–67 | Alba Berlin |
Scoring by quarter: 21–16, 14–20, 27–17, 18–14
| Pts: Ronaldo Segu 16; Rebs: Filip Stanić 11; Asts: Ronaldo Segu 8 | | Pts: Matt Thomas 15; Rebs: David McCormack 9 Asts: Matteo Spagnolo 6 |

Brose Arena, Bamberg
Attendance: 5,700
Referees: Robert Lottermoser, Benjamin Barth, Christof Madinger

9 December 2024
20:00

Boxscore

| Bayern Munich | 103–67 | Rasta Vechta |
Scoring by quarter: 31–16, 25–19, 20–17, 27–15
| Pts: Carsen Edwards 29; Rebs: Giffey, Da Silva 7 Asts: Nick Weiler-Babb 4 | | Pts: Brandon Randolph 30; Rebs: Brandon Randolph 11; Asts: Bothwell, Campbell 3 |

BMW Park, Munich
Attendance: 6,157
Referees: Gentian Cici, Christian Theis, Carsten Straube

== Final four ==
The draw took place on 9 December 2024. The games took place on 15 and 16 February 2025 at the Stadthalle Weißenfels in Weißenfels.

=== Bracket ===
Semi-finals
15 February
Bayern Munich | 93
Mitteldeutscher BC | 95
15 February
Skyliners Frankfurt | 63
Bamberg Baskets | 76

Final
16 February
Mitteldeutscher BC | 97
Bamberg Baskets | 87

=== Semifinals ===
15 February 2025
16:00

Boxscore

| Bayern Munich | 93–95 | Mitteldeutscher BC |
Scoring by quarter: 20–22, 23–26, 30–25, 20–22
| Pts: Carsen Edwards 21; Rebs: Vladimir Lučić 6 Asts: Nick Weiler-Babb 11 | | Pts: Spencer Reaves 23; Rebs: Martin Breunig 9 Asts: Devoe, Callison 8 |

Stadthalle Weißenfels, Weißenfels
Attendance: 3,000
Referees: Anne Panther, Gentian Cici, Zulfikar Oruzgani

15 February 2025
19:00

Boxscore

| Skyliners Frankfurt | 63–76 | Bamberg Baskets |
Scoring by quarter: 15–23, 16–12, 18–23, 14–18
| Pts: Jordan Theodore 13; Rebs: David Muenkat 11; Asts: Malik Parsons 5 | | Pts: Ibrahim Watson-Boye 20; Rebs: Filip Stanić 8 Asts: Kyle Lofton 5 |

Stadthalle Weißenfels, Weißenfels
Attendance: 3,000
Referees: Robert Lottermoser, Martin Matip, Johannes Hack

=== Final ===
16 February 2025
16:00

Boxscore

| Mitteldeutscher BC | 97–87 | Bamberg Baskets |
Scoring by quarter: 28–17, 22–22, 25–21, 22–27
| Pts: Michael Devoe 27; Rebs: Ivan Tkachenko 6 Asts: Callison, Reaves 6 | | Pts: Ronaldo Segu 22; Rebs: Moritz Krimmer 8 Asts: Lofton, Segu 6 |

Stadthalle Weißenfels, Weißenfels
Attendance: 3,000
Referees: Anne Panther, Gentian Cici, Zulfikar Oruzgani
