= Kenneth Cooper =

Ken(neth) or Kenny Cooper may refer to:

- Kenny Cooper (basketball) (born 1997), American basketball player
- Kenneth Cooper (cricketer) (1883–1969), English soldier and cricketer
- Kenneth Cooper (British Army officer) (1905–1981)
- Ken Cooper (American football guard) (1923–1997), American football player and coach, head football coach at Austin Peay State University (1955–1957)
- Kenneth H. Cooper (born 1931), American physician, United States Air Force officer, pioneer of aerobics
- Ken Cooper (American football coach) (1937–2017), American football player and coach, head football coach at the University of Mississippi (1974–1977)
- Ken Cooper (boxer) (born 1943), English boxer
- Kenny Cooper Sr. (born 1946), English soccer player
- Ken Cooper (cricketer) (born 1954), South African cricketer
- Kenneth W. Cooper (born 1961), American labor union leader
- Kenny Cooper (born 1984), American soccer player, son of the previous
