= Dean Laing =

South African cricketer (born 1970)

Personal information
- Full name: Dean Ralph Laing
- Born: September 18, 1970 (age 56)
- Batting: Right-handed
- Bowling: Right-arm medium pace
- Relatives: Ken Cooper (uncle)

Domestic team information
- Years: Team
- 1988–1998: Transvaal
- Nottinghamshire

Dean Ralph Laing (born 18 September 1970) is a former South African cricketer who played for Transvaal between 1988 and 1998. He also made one appearance for Nottinghamshire.

A right-handed batsman and right-arm medium pace bowler, Laing was educated at Jeppe High School for Boys in Johannesburg and played junior representative cricket for South Africa Schools in the 1987–88 season.

His uncle, Ken Cooper, played for Natal in the 1970s and was South African Cricketer of the Year for 1981.
