= 2025 FIBA Under-19 Basketball World Cup =

Coupe du monde de basketball FIBA des moins de 19 ans 2025 FIBA U19-Basketball-Weltmeisterschaft 2025 Coppa del Mondo di pallacanestro FIBA Under-19 2025
- Logo of the 2025 FIBA Under-19 Basketball World Cup

Tournament details
- Host country: Switzerland
- City: Lausanne
- Dates: 28 June – 6 July 2025
- Teams: 16 (from 5 confederations)
- Venues: 2 (in 1 host city)

Final positions
- Champions: United States (9th title)
- Runners-up: Germany
- Third place: Slovenia
- Fourth place: New Zealand

Tournament statistics
- Games played: 56
- Attendance: 73,320 (1,309 per game)
- MVP: (United States) AJ Dybantsa
- Top scorer: (Argentina) Tyler Kropp (21.7 points per game)

Official website
- FIBA

The 2025 FIBA Under-19 Basketball World Cup was the 17th edition of the FIBA Under-19 Basketball World Cup, the biennial international men's youth basketball championship contested by the U19 national teams of the member associations of FIBA. The tournament was held in Lausanne, Switzerland, from 28 June to 6 July 2025. This marked the first time that Switzerland hosted a FIBA global tournament. The United States won their ninth title, after defeating Germany 109–76 in the final. USA player AJ Dybantsa was named tournament MVP.

== Qualified teams ==
Means of qualification	Dates	Venue	Berth(s)	Qualifier(s)
Host nation	—N/a	—N/a	1	Switzerland
2024 FIBA U18 AmeriCup	3–9 June 2024	(Argentina) Buenos Aires	4	United States; Argentina; Canada; Dominican Republic
2024 FIBA U18 EuroBasket	27 July – 4 August 2024	(Finland) Tampere	5	Germany; Serbia; Slovenia; Israel; France
2024 FIBA U18 Asia Cup	2–9 September 2024	(Jordan) Amman	4	Australia; New Zealand; China; Jordan
2024 FIBA U18 AfroBasket	3–14 September 2024	(South Africa) Pretoria	2	Mali; Cameroon
Total			16	

== Draw ==
The draw was held on 31 January 2025 at the Olympic Museum Auditorium in Lausanne, Switzerland.

=== Seeding ===
The seeding was announced on 29 January 2025. Teams were distributed into the four pots based on the FIBA Boys World Ranking and the results of the 2024 FIBA U18 continental competitions.

Teams from the same region could not be drawn into the same group, with the exception of Europe where each group had to contain a minimum of one and a maximum of two European teams.

Pot 1	Pot 2	Pot 3	Pot 4
Switzerland; United States; Germany; Serbia	Australia; Slovenia; Argentina; Israel	France; New Zealand; Canada; Dominican Republic	Mali; China; Cameroon; Jordan

== Referees ==
The following referees were selected for the tournament.

- (Angola) Claudio Eiuba
- (Australia) Nicolas Fernandes
- (Australia) James Griguol
- (Brazil) Fernando Leite
- (Brazil) Alan dos Santos
- (Bosnia and Herzegovina) Ademir Zurapović
- (Bulgaria) Ventsislav Velikov
- (Canada) Waseem Husainy
- (China) Sun Jian
- (Colombia) Carlos Vélez
- (Croatia) Martin Vulić
- (Ecuador) Carlos Peralta
- (Estonia) Mikhel Männiste
- (France) Yohan Rosso
- (Honduras) Orlando Varela
- (Iraq) Ahmed Al-Shuwaili
- (Japan) Daigo Urushima
- (Jordan) Mohammad Taha
- (Kazakhstan) Yevgeniy Mikheyev
- (Lithuania) Juozas Barkausaks
- (Madagascar) Yann Davidson
- (Poland) Wojciech Liszka
- (Puerto Rico) Johnny Batista
- (Puerto Rico) Edwin Quiles
- (Slovenia) Boris Krejić
- (South Korea) Park Kyoung-jin
- (Spain) Luis Castillo
- (Turkey) Kerem Baki
- (Turkey) Can Mavisu
- (Turkey) Yener Yılmaz
- (United States) Blanca Burns
- (United States) Matthew Myers

== Preliminary round ==
All times are local (UTC+2).

=== Group A ===
Pos	Team	Pld	W	L	PF	PA	PD	Pts
1	New Zealand	3	2	1	247	225	+22	5 (Note: Argentina 72–77 New Zealand)
2	Argentina	3	2	1	218	209	+9	5
3	Mali	3	1	2	188	218	−30	4 (Note: Mali 72–70 Serbia)
4	Serbia	3	1	2	239	240	−1	4

Source: FIBA
Rules for classification: 1) Points; 2) Head-to-head results; 3) Points difference; 4) Points scored.
Notes:

28 June 2025
11:15

Boxscore

Argentina	72–77	New Zealand
Scoring by quarter: 31–18, 11–22, 15–16, 15–21
Pts: Kropp 22; Rebs: Kropp 11; Asts: Minzer, Sucatzky 4		Pts: Ball 17; Rebs: Jones 12; Asts: Isaac 4

Vaudoise Aréna Hall 2, Lausanne
Attendance: 150
Referees: Nicolas Fernandes (AUS), Carlos Vélez (COL), Sun Jian (CHN)

28 June 2025
11:45

Boxscore

Mali	72–70	Serbia
Scoring by quarter: 22–14, 18–25, 19–20, 13–11
Pts: Bagayoko 21; Rebs: A. Traoré 10; Asts: Doumbia 6		Pts: Džepina 20; Rebs: Džepina 6 Asts: Drezgić 7

Vaudoise Aréna, Lausanne
Attendance: 500
Referees: Yohan Rosso (FRA), Yann Davidson (MAD), Mohammad Taha (JOR)

29 June 2025
14:00

Boxscore

New Zealand	73–50	Mali
Scoring by quarter: 22–9, 19–29, 17–5, 15–7
Pts: Jones 19; Rebs: Goodman 9 Asts: three players 4		Pts: Y. Traoré 11; Rebs: Y. Traoré 10; Asts: Doumbia 6

Vaudoise Aréna Hall 2, Lausanne
Attendance: 135
Referees: Boris Krejić (SLO), Daigo Urushima (JPN), Fernando Leite (BRA)

29 June 2025
14:30

Boxscore

Serbia	66–71	Argentina
Scoring by quarter: 15–17, 21–25, 15–10, 15–19
Pts: Džepina 17; Rebs: Šojić 10; Asts: Drezgić 4		Pts: Kropp 23; Rebs: Kropp 9 Asts: Sucatzky 9

Vaudoise Aréna, Lausanne
Attendance: 2,305
Referees: Johnny Batista (PUR), James Griguol (AUS), Ventsislav Velikov (BUL)

1 July 2025
11:45

Boxscore

Argentina	75–66	Mali
Scoring by quarter: 20–13, 15–17, 17–21, 23–15
Pts: Kropp 24; Rebs: Kropp 9 Asts: Minzer 7		Pts: Y. Traoré 17; Rebs: Coulibaly, Y. Traoré 6 Asts: Doumbia 5

Vaudoise Aréna Hall 2, Lausanne
Attendance: 106
Referees: Yohan Rosso (FRA), Matthew Myers (USA), Yann Davidson (MAD)

1 July 2025
11:45

Boxscore

Serbia	103–97	New Zealand
Scoring by quarter: 21–28, 24–22, 20–22, 38–25
Pts: Drezgić 24; Rebs: Jovanović 6 Asts: Drezgić 6		Pts: Ball 19; Rebs: Plumtree 7 Asts: Isaac 8

Vaudoise Aréna, Lausanne
Attendance: 802
Referees: Wojciech Liszka (POL), Ahmed Al-Shuwaili (IRQ), Yener Yılmaz (TUR)

=== Group B ===
Pos	Team	Pld	W	L	PF	PA	PD	Pts
1	Germany	3	3	0	269	222	+47	6
2	Canada	3	2	1	250	239	+11	5
3	Slovenia	3	1	2	230	239	−9	4
4	China	3	0	3	220	269	−49	3

Source: FIBA
Rules for classification: 1) Points; 2) Head-to-head results; 3) Points difference; 4) Points scored.

28 June 2025
14:00

Boxscore

China	72–80	Canada
Scoring by quarter: 16–24, 13–18, 23–18, 20–20
Pts: Zhang 20; Rebs: Wang 9 Asts: Chen 5		Pts: Oliogu 17; Rebs: Meyer 12; Asts: Charles 6

Vaudoise Aréna Hall 2, Lausanne
Attendance: 300
Referees: Matthew Myers (USA), James Griguol (AUS), Juozas Barkausaks (LTU)

28 June 2025
14:30

Boxscore

Slovenia	68–75	Germany
Scoring by quarter: 17–19, 21–12, 17–23, 13–21
Pts: Smrekar 21; Rebs: Kroflič, Smrekar 5 Asts: Padjen 6		Pts: Steinbach 19; Rebs: Steinbach 19; Asts: Kayil 6

Vaudoise Aréna, Lausanne
Attendance: 925
Referees: Ademir Zurapović (BIH), Ventsislav Velikov (BUL), Yener Yılmaz (TUR)

29 June 2025
11:15

Boxscore

Canada	82–63	Slovenia
Scoring by quarter: 10–23, 20–20, 35–9, 17–11
Pts: Charles 27; Rebs: Nnani 11; Asts: Charles 5		Pts: Kroflič, Smrekar 10; Rebs: Hrabar, Kroflič 7 Asts: Kroflič 5

Vaudoise Aréna Hall 2, Lausanne
Attendance: 200
Referees: Yohan Rosso (FRA), Mikhel Männiste (EST), Ahmed Al-Shuwaili (IRQ)

29 June 2025
11:45

Boxscore

Germany	90–66	China
Scoring by quarter: 29–13, 20–21, 25–18, 16–14
Pts: Reibe 15; Rebs: Duru 8 Asts: Steinbach 5		Pts: Chen, Zhu 12; Rebs: Feng 6 Asts: Wang, Zhu 3

Vaudoise Aréna, Lausanne
Attendance: 1,236
Referees: Matthew Myers (USA), Yann Davidson (MAD), Edwin Quiles (PUR)

1 July 2025
14:30

Boxscore

China	82–99	Slovenia
Scoring by quarter: 23–26, 16–25, 16–26, 27–22
Pts: Feng, Huan S. 12; Rebs: Feng, Yang 5 Asts: Zhu, Yang 4		Pts: Ivičić 19; Rebs: Ciperle 6 Asts: Padjen 6

Vaudoise Aréna Hall 2, Lausanne
Attendance: 141
Referees: Luis Castillo (ESP), James Griguol (AUS), Mohammad Taha (JOR)

1 July 2025
14:30

Boxscore

Germany	104–88	Canada
Scoring by quarter: 32–28, 25–13, 28–22, 19–25
Pts: Anderson 29; Rebs: Reibe, Steinbach 7 Asts: Kayil 7		Pts: Oliogu 21; Rebs: Ahrens, Nnani 5 Asts: Meyer 4

Vaudoise Aréna, Lausanne
Attendance: 1,206
Referees: Johnny Batista (PUR), Carlos Vélez (COL), Nicolas Fernandes (AUS)

=== Group C ===
Pos	Team	Pld	W	L	PF	PA	PD	Pts
1	Israel	3	3	0	202	153	+49	6
2	Switzerland (H)	3	2	1	248	225	+23	5
3	Dominican Republic	3	1	2	231	229	+2	4
4	Jordan	3	0	3	116	190	−74	2

Updated to match(es) played on 1 July 2025. Source: FIBA
Rules for classification: 1) Points; 2) Head-to-head results; 3) Points difference; 4) Points scored.
(H) Hosts

28 June 2025
19:30

Boxscore

Jordan	69–79	Dominican Republic
Scoring by quarter: 20–22, 17–26, 17–10, 15–21
Pts: Saleh 19; Rebs: Saleh 8 Asts: Abu-Saab, Saleh 4		Pts: Morillo 26; Rebs: Morillo 12; Asts: Carbuccia 10

Vaudoise Aréna Hall 2, Lausanne
Attendance: 200
Referees: Boris Krejić (SLO), Ahmed Al-Shuwaili (IRQ), Edwin Quiles (PUR)

28 June 2025
20:00

Boxscore

Switzerland	77–102	Israel
Scoring by quarter: 22–23, 17–27, 18–27, 20–25
Pts: Maniema 14; Rebs: Nessah 8 Asts: Nessah 6		Pts: Mayer 24; Rebs: Sela 12; Asts: Belaga 5

Vaudoise Aréna, Lausanne
Attendance: 500
Referees: Martin Vulić (CRO), Kerem Baki (TUR), Fernando Leite (BRA)

29 June 2025
16:45

Boxscore

Israel	20–0 (Note: The match was forfeited by the Jordan team, resulting in a 20–0 win for Israel and no points for Jordan.)	Jordan

Vaudoise Aréna Hall 2, Lausanne
Referees: Wojciech Liszka (POL), Waseem Husainy (CAN), Park Kyoung-jin (KOR)

29 June 2025
17:15

Boxscore

Dominican Republic	76–80	Switzerland
Scoring by quarter: 14–15, 16–27, 24–17, 22–21
Pts: Morillo 21; Rebs: Brito 12; Asts: Carbuccia 6		Pts: Nessah 23; Rebs: Nessah 10; Asts: Nessah 5

Vaudoise Aréna, Lausanne
Attendance: 4,576
Referees: Luis Castillo (ESP), Nicolas Fernandes (AUS), Claudio Eiuba (ANG)

1 July 2025
20:00

Boxscore

Jordan	47–91	Switzerland
Scoring by quarter: 4–29, 14–21, 14–25, 15–16
Pts: Saleh 10; Rebs: Al-Shami 9 Asts: Abu-Saab 3		Pts: Ouko 18; Rebs: Mbamen 10; Asts: Sassella 9

Vaudoise Aréna, Lausanne
Attendance: 1,172
Referees: Martin Vulić (CRO), Waseem Husainy (CAN), Sun Jian (CHN)

1 July 2025
20:00

Boxscore

Israel	80–76	Dominican Republic
Scoring by quarter: 26–17, 16–21, 20–22, 18–16
Pts: Belaga 16; Rebs: Sela 17; Asts: Belaga 6		Pts: Santos 25; Rebs: Morillo 11; Asts: Morillo 5

Vaudoise Aréna Hall 2, Lausanne
Attendance: 251
Referees: Ademir Zurapović (BIH), Kerem Baki (TUR), Park Kyoung-jin (KOR)

=== Group D ===
Pos	Team	Pld	W	L	PF	PA	PD	Pts
1	United States	3	3	0	325	220	+105	6
2	Australia	3	2	1	245	247	−2	5
3	France	3	1	2	215	229	−14	4
4	Cameroon	3	0	3	216	305	−89	3

Source: FIBA
Rules for classification: 1) Points; 2) Head-to-head results; 3) Points difference; 4) Points scored.

28 June 2025
16:45

Boxscore

Cameroon	50–75	France
Scoring by quarter: 13–19, 12–13, 15–21, 10–22
Pts: Basson, Belbi 15; Rebs: Belbi, Seini 6 Asts: Basson 3		Pts: Soulhac 16; Rebs: Fodzo, Kouakou-Heugue 9 Asts: three players 4

Vaudoise Aréna Hall 2, Lausanne
Attendance: 200
Referees: Luis Castillo (ESP), Waseem Husainy (CAN), Park Kyoung-jin (KOR)

28 June 2025
17:15

Boxscore

United States	88–73	Australia
Scoring by quarter: 25–15, 24–22, 19–18, 20–18
Pts: Dybantsa 18; Rebs: Johnson Jr., Peat 10; Asts: Brown 7		Pts: Furphy 24; Rebs: Siulepa 12; Asts: three players 2

Vaudoise Aréna, Lausanne
Attendance: 1,000
Referees: Wojciech Liszka (POL), Mikhel Männiste (EST), Orlando Varela (HON)

29 June 2025
19:30

Boxscore

Australia	101–96 (OT)	Cameroon
Scoring by quarter: 20–21, 26–19, 15–14, 22–29, Overtime: 8–8, 10–5
Pts: Daniels, Siulepa 22; Rebs: Siulepa 13; Asts: Dickeson 4		Pts: Nantah 29; Rebs: Seini 25; Asts: Bom 5

Vaudoise Aréna Hall 2, Lausanne
Attendance: 143
Referees: Ademir Zurapović (BIH), Carlos Vélez (COL), Juozas Barkausaks (LTU)

29 June 2025
20:00

Boxscore

France	77–108	United States
Scoring by quarter: 18–33, 20–17, 22–28, 17–30
Pts: Fodzo 17; Rebs: Bracq, Moupadele 5 Asts: Bracq 4		Pts: Brown 24; Rebs: four players 4 Asts: Mandaquit 7

Vaudoise Aréna, Lausanne
Attendance: 5,517
Referees: Martin Vulić (CRO), Alan dos Santos (BRA), Kerem Baki (TUR)

1 July 2025
17:15

Boxscore

Cameroon	70–129	United States
Scoring by quarter: 25–28, 13–44, 24–29, 8–28
Pts: Basson 19; Rebs: Seini 5 Asts: Basson 3		Pts: Brown 24; Rebs: Holt 8 Asts: Mandaquit 7

Vaudoise Aréna, Lausanne
Attendance: 1,954
Referees: Alan dos Santos (BRA), Ventsislav Velikov (BUL), Fernando Leite (BRA)

1 July 2025
17:15

Boxscore

Australia	71–63	France
Scoring by quarter: 19–15, 16–10, 19–11, 17–22
Pts: Furphy, Siulepa 19; Rebs: Siulepa 8 Asts: Daniels 7		Pts: Soulhac 12; Rebs: Sissoko 7 Asts: Soulhac 6

Vaudoise Aréna Hall 2, Lausanne
Attendance: 420
Referees: Boris Krejić (SLO), Mikhel Männiste (EST), Orlando Varela (HON)

== Knockout stage ==
=== Bracket ===
Round of 16
2 July
A1 New Zealand	99
B4 China	86
2 July
C2 Switzerland (OT)	86
D3 France	79
2 July
A3 Mali	75
B2 Canada	100
2 July
C4 Jordan	67
D1 United States	140
2 July
A2 Argentina	80
B3 Slovenia	81
2 July
C1 Israel	86
D4 Cameroon	82
2 July
A4 Serbia	83
B1 Germany	92
2 July
C3 Dominican Republic	96
D2 Australia	106

Quarter-finals
4 July
A1 New Zealand	84
C2 Switzerland	70
4 July
B2 Canada	102
D1 United States	108
4 July
B3 Slovenia	79
C1 Israel	55
4 July
B1 Germany	80
D2 Australia	67

Semi-finals
5 July
A1 New Zealand	64
D1 United States	120
5 July
B3 Slovenia	72
B1 Germany	84

Final
6 July
D1 United States	109
B1 Germany	76
Third place
6 July
A1 New Zealand	87
B3 Slovenia	91

==== 5–8th place bracket ====
5–8th place semifinals
5 July
C2 Switzerland	61
B2 Canada	93
5 July
C1 Israel	72
D2 Australia	78

Fifth place
6 July
B2 Canada	75
D2 Australia	72
Seventh place
6 July
C2 Switzerland	68
C1 Israel	79

==== 9–16th place bracket ====
9–16th place quarterfinals
4 July
B4 China	76
D3 France	85
4 July
A3 Mali	91
C4 Jordan	50
4 July
A2 Argentina	85
D4 Cameroon	67
4 July
A4 Serbia	94
C3 Dominican Republic	88

9–12th place semifinals
5 July
D3 France	76
A3 Mali	71
5 July
A2 Argentina	73
A4 Serbia	79

Ninth place
6 July
D3 France	93
A4 Serbia	96
Eleventh place
6 July
A3 Mali	89
A2 Argentina	79

==== 13–16th place bracket ====
13–16th place semifinals
5 July
B4 China	97
C4 Jordan	78
5 July
D4 Cameroon	86
C3 Dominican Republic	84

13th place
6 July
B4 China	81
D4 Cameroon	77
15th place
6 July
C4 Jordan	73
C3 Dominican Republic	95

=== Round of 16 ===
2 July 2025
11:15

Boxscore

Argentina	80–81	Slovenia
Scoring by quarter: 17–19, 17–20, 21–20, 25–22
Pts: Minzer 26; Rebs: Kropp 12; Asts: Díaz 12		Pts: Padjen 22; Rebs: Kroflic 7 Asts: Padjen, Smrekar 7

Vaudoise Aréna, Lausanne
Attendance: 262
Referees: Johnny Batista (PUR), Nicolas Fernandes (AUS), Edwin Quiles (PUR)

2 July 2025
11:45

Boxscore

New Zealand	99–86	China
Scoring by quarter: 24–13, 28–24, 25–35, 22–14
Pts: Isaac 18; Rebs: Jones 9 Asts: Isaac 8		Pts: Zhang 21; Rebs: Huan S. 5 Asts: Zhu 7

Vaudoise Aréna, Lausanne
Attendance: 521
Referees: Matthew Myers (USA), Martin Vulić (CRO), Daigo Urushima (JPN)

2 July 2025
14:00

Boxscore

Mali	75–100	Canada
Scoring by quarter: 17–15, 14–22, 25–27, 19–36
Pts: Y. Traoré 25; Rebs: Y. Traoré 9 Asts: Doumbia, Y. Traoré 4		Pts: Beckford 16; Rebs: Ahrens 9 Asts: Nyorha 6

Vaudoise Aréna, Lausanne
Attendance: 174
Referees: James Griguol (AUS), Alan dos Santos (BRA), Juozas Barkausaks (LTU)

2 July 2025
14:30

Boxscore

Serbia	83–92	Germany
Scoring by quarter: 13–23, 29–22, 23–28, 18–19
Pts: Drezgić 32; Rebs: Drezgić 11; Asts: Drezgić, Marković 3		Pts: Reibe 25; Rebs: Steinbach 19; Asts: Anderson 12

Vaudoise Aréna, Lausanne
Attendance: 1,357
Referees: Yohan Rosso (FRA), Ventsislav Velikov (BUL), Mikhel Männiste (EST)

2 July 2025
16:45

Boxscore

Israel	86–82	Cameroon
Scoring by quarter: 15–22, 23–23, 19–15, 29–22
Pts: Mayer 33; Rebs: Sela 8 Asts: Mayer 7		Pts: Basson 25; Rebs: Seini 22; Asts: Bom 6

Vaudoise Aréna, Lausanne
Attendance: 262
Referees: Boris Krejić (SLO), Yann Davidson (MAD), Sun Jian (CHN)

2 July 2025
17:15

Boxscore

Jordan	67–140	United States
Scoring by quarter: 15–32, 22–35, 19–39, 11–34
Pts: Al-Jaibat 16; Rebs: Salman 7 Asts: Abu-Saab 4		Pts: Johnson Jr., Stokes 19; Rebs: Stokes 11; Asts: Stokes 10

Vaudoise Aréna, Lausanne
Attendance: 1,784
Referees: Luis Castillo (ESP), Park Kyoung-jin (KOR), Claudio Eiuba (ANG)

2 July 2025
19:30

Boxscore

Dominican Republic	96–106	Australia
Scoring by quarter: 16–25, 25–26, 23–25, 32–30
Pts: Morillo 22; Rebs: Morillo 7 Asts: Carbuccia 6		Pts: Furphy 24; Rebs: Whitbourn 12; Asts: Brogan 6

Vaudoise Aréna, Lausanne
Attendance: 185
Referees: Wojciech Liszka (POL), Yener Yılmaz (TUR), Waseem Husainy (CAN)

2 July 2025
20:00

Boxscore

Switzerland	86–79 (OT)	France
Scoring by quarter: 13–24, 13–14, 23–16, 17–12, Overtime: 20–13
Pts: Sassella 25; Rebs: Nessah 12; Asts: Maniema 9		Pts: Bracq 16; Rebs: Sankhe 8 Asts: three players 3

Vaudoise Aréna, Lausanne
Attendance: 3,073
Referees: Ademir Zurapović (BIH), Carlos Vélez (COL), Ahmed Al-Shuwaili (IRQ)

=== 9–16th place quarterfinals ===
4 July 2025
11:15

Boxscore

Argentina	85–67	Cameroon
Scoring by quarter: 25–14, 21–16, 24–23, 15–14
Pts: Kropp 25; Rebs: Kropp 9 Asts: Sucatzky 14		Pts: Bom 15; Rebs: Seini 12; Asts: Bom 3

Vaudoise Aréna Hall 2, Lausanne
Attendance: 155
Referees: Ademir Zurapović (BIH), Mikhel Männiste (EST), Mohammad Taha (JOR)

4 July 2025
13:45

Boxscore

Serbia	94–88	Dominican Republic
Scoring by quarter: 33–22, 22–13, 16–19, 23–34
Pts: Džepina 26; Rebs: Stanojević 10; Asts: Drezgić 8		Pts: Carbuccia 23; Rebs: Morillo 13; Asts: Morillo 7

Vaudoise Aréna Hall 2, Lausanne
Attendance: 198
Referees: Luis Castillo (ESP), Nicolas Fernandes (AUS), Orlando Varela (HON)

4 July 2025
16:15

Boxscore

Mali	91–50	Jordan
Scoring by quarter: 30–7, 23–11, 26–19, 12–13
Pts: Bagayoko 22; Rebs: Y. Traoré 11; Asts: Doumbia 9		Pts: Zeid 11; Rebs: Hijazi 6 Asts: Saleh 4

Vaudoise Aréna Hall 2, Lausanne
Attendance: 190
Referees: Matthew Myers (USA), Ventsislav Velikov (BUL), Fernando Leite (BRA)

4 July 2025
18:45

Boxscore

China	76–85	France
Scoring by quarter: 22–15, 15–28, 18–17, 21–25
Pts: Zhang 17; Rebs: Huan 9 Asts: Zhu 5		Pts: Dada 21; Rebs: Sifferlin, Sankhe 4 Asts: Sankhe 10

Vaudoise Aréna Hall 2, Lausanne
Attendance: 130
Referees: Martin Vulić (CRO), Ahmed Al-Shuwaili (IRQ), Claudio Eiuba (ANG)

=== Quarterfinals ===
4 July 2025
11:45

Boxscore

Slovenia	79–55	Israel
Scoring by quarter: 15–14, 23–14, 22–14, 19–13
Pts: Smrekar 22; Rebs: Smrekar 8 Asts: Padjen 9		Pts: Sahar 20; Rebs: Sela 10; Asts: Mayer 4

Vaudoise Aréna, Lausanne
Attendance: 1,058
Referees: Wojciech Liszka (POL), Alan dos Santos (BRA), Carlos Vélez (COL)

4 July 2025
14:30

Boxscore

Germany	80–67	Australia
Scoring by quarter: 28–14, 24–19, 12–24, 16–10
Pts: Anderson 18; Rebs: Steinbach 16; Asts: Kayil 12		Pts: Fennell 18; Rebs: Furphy 8 Asts: three players 2

Vaudoise Aréna, Lausanne
Attendance: 1,198
Referees: Johnny Batista (PUR), Kerem Baki (TUR), Waseem Husainy (CAN)

4 July 2025
17:15

Boxscore

Canada	102–108	United States
Scoring by quarter: 24–30, 30–31, 24–18, 24–29
Pts: Charles 19; Rebs: three players 6 Asts: Nyorha 6		Pts: Dybantsa 22; Rebs: Peat 11; Asts: Brown 8

Vaudoise Aréna, Lausanne
Attendance: 4,113
Referees: Boris Krejić (SLO), Yener Yılmaz (TUR), Sun Jian (CHN)

4 July 2025
20:00

Boxscore

New Zealand	84–79	Switzerland
Scoring by quarter: 16–23, 22–21, 29–12, 17–14
Pts: Jones 23; Rebs: Goodman 13; Asts: Jones 5		Pts: Nessah 19; Rebs: Nessah 10; Asts: Nessah 3

Vaudoise Aréna, Lausanne
Attendance: 5,088
Referees: Yohan Rosso (FRA), James Griguol (AUS), Yann Davidson (MAD)

=== 13–16th place semifinals ===
5 July 2025
11:15

Boxscore

Cameroon	86–84	Dominican Republic
Scoring by quarter: 13–24, 19–22, 20–15, 34–23
Pts: Bom 19; Rebs: Seini 14; Asts: Kingue 8		Pts: Morillo 20; Rebs: Baez 11; Asts: Carbuccia 7

Vaudoise Aréna Hall 2, Lausanne
Attendance: 161
Referees: Johnny Batista (PUR), Daigo Urushima (JPN), Edwin Quiles (PUR)

5 July 2025
13:45

Boxscore

China	97–78	Jordan
Scoring by quarter: 29–17, 21–18, 31–19, 16–24
Pts: Zhang 22; Rebs: Wang, Zhang 8 Asts: Yang 17		Pts: Hijazi, Mucharbach 14; Rebs: Mucharbach 8 Asts: Zeid 6

Vaudoise Aréna Hall 2, Lausanne
Attendance: 144
Referees: James Griguol (AUS), Park Kyoung-jin (KOR), Orlando Varela (HON)

=== 9–12th place semifinals ===
5 July 2025
16:15

Boxscore

Argentina	73–76	Serbia
Scoring by quarter: 27–10, 15–17, 18–27, 13–22
Pts: Kropp 19; Rebs: Kropp 12; Asts: Sucatzky 7		Pts: Kostić 25; Rebs: Drezgić 9 Asts: Džepina 4

Vaudoise Aréna Hall 2, Lausanne
Attendance: 277
Referees: Matthew Myers (USA), Yener Yılmaz (TUR), Alan dos Santos (BRA)

5 July 2025
18:45

Boxscore

France	76–71	Mali
Scoring by quarter: 20–15, 15–18, 27–16, 14–22
Pts: Pons 15; Rebs: Sissoko 7 Asts: four players 4		Pts: Y. Traoré 19; Rebs: Y. Traoré 12; Asts: Keita 4

Vaudoise Aréna Hall 2, Lausanne
Attendance: 401
Referees: Ademir Zurapović (BIH), Juozas Barkauskas (LTU), Mohammad Taha (JOR)

=== 5–8th place semifinals ===
5 July 2025
11:30

Boxscore

Israel	72–78	Australia
Scoring by quarter: 18–27, 22–13, 14–23, 18–15
Pts: Sahar 21; Rebs: Sela 10; Asts: Belaga 6		Pts: Siulepa 24; Rebs: four players 7 Asts: Miller Brogan 4

Vaudoise Aréna, Lausanne
Attendance: 921
Referees: Boris Krejić (SLO), Yann Davidson (MAD), Sun Jian (CHN)

5 July 2025
14:00

Boxscore

Switzerland	61–93	Canada
Scoring by quarter: 17–32, 20–26, 13–11, 11–24
Pts: three players 11; Rebs: Nessah 10; Asts: Da Silva 4		Pts: Ahrens 14; Rebs: Dann 8 Asts: Nyorha 9

Vaudoise Aréna, Lausanne
Attendance: 2,185
Referees: Yohan Rosso (FRA), Ventsislav Velikov (BUL), Kerem Baki (TUR)

=== Semifinals ===
5 July 2025
17:00

Boxscore

Slovenia	72–84	Germany
Scoring by quarter: 17–19, 14–26, 18–12, 23–27
Pts: Padjen 23; Rebs: Smrekar 4 Asts: Padjen, Smrekar 5		Pts: Anderson 27; Rebs: Steinbach 16; Asts: Anderson 6

Vaudoise Aréna, Lausanne
Attendance: 4,476
Referees: Luis Castillo (ESP), Martin Vulić (CRO), Mihkel Männiste (EST)

5 July 2025
20:00

Boxscore

New Zealand	64–120	United States
Scoring by quarter: 14–32, 12–23, 24–26, 14–39
Pts: Halaifonua 15; Rebs: four players 4 Asts: Jones 3		Pts: Holt 20; Rebs: Holt 7 Asts: Mandaquit 7

Vaudoise Aréna, Lausanne
Attendance: 5,184
Referees: Wojciech Liszka (POL), Carlos Vélez (COL), Waseem Husainy (CAN)

=== 15th place game ===
6 July 2025
10:00

Boxscore

Jordan	73–95	Dominican Republic
Scoring by quarter: 17–16, 14–27, 20–25, 22–27
Pts: Saleh 19; Rebs: Saleh 9 Asts: Zeid 6		Pts: Brito 19; Rebs: Baez 9 Asts: Carbuccia 8

Vaudoise Aréna Hall 2, Lausanne
Attendance: 153
Referees: Orlando Varela (HON), Fernando Leite (BRA), Claudio Eiuba (ANG)

=== 13th place game ===
6 July 2025
12:30

Boxscore

China	81–77	Cameroon
Scoring by quarter: 21–24, 20–16, 17–20, 23–17
Pts: Chen J. 25; Rebs: Zhang B. 9 Asts: Chen J., Cui X. 3		Pts: Basson 22; Rebs: Seini 24; Asts: Basson 5

Vaudoise Aréna Hall 2, Lausanne
Attendance: 199
Referees: Alan dos Santos (BRA), Juozas Barkausaks (LTU), Mohammad Taha (JOR)

=== Eleventh place game ===
6 July 2025
15:00

Boxscore

Mali	89–79	Argentina
Scoring by quarter: 17–22, 23–26, 23–14, 26–17
Pts: Y. Troaré 27; Rebs: Y. Traoré 12; Asts: Bagayoko 6		Pts: Kropp 21; Rebs: Kropp 6 Asts: Sucatzky 10

Vaudoise Aréna Hall 2, Lausanne
Attendance: 199
Referees: Martin Vulić (CRO), Kerem Baki (TUR), Sun Jian (CHN)

=== Ninth place game ===
6 July 2025
17:30

Boxscore

France	93–96	Serbia
Scoring by quarter: 26–27, 24–23, 16–20, 27–26
Pts: Fodzo 18; Rebs: Bassong, Pons 4 Asts: Bracq 5		Pts: Kostić 22; Rebs: Džepina 9 Asts: Drezgić 10

Vaudoise Aréna Hall 2, Lausanne
Attendance: 383
Referees: Johnny Batista (PUR), Yener Yılmaz (TUR), Mikhel Männiste (EST)

=== Seventh place game ===
6 July 2025
11:30

Boxscore

Switzerland	68–79	Israel
Scoring by quarter: 13–19, 19–26, 19–16, 17–18
Pts: Nessah 25; Rebs: Nessah 8 Asts: Maniema 6		Pts: Sahar 21; Rebs: Belaga 14; Asts: Belaga 8

Vaudoise Aréna, Lausanne
Attendance: 1,246
Referees: Wojciech Liszka (POL), Nicolas Fernandes (AUS), Park Kyoung-jin (KOR)

=== Fifth place game ===
6 July 2025
14:00

Boxscore

Canada	75–72	Australia
Scoring by quarter: 22–15, 21–31, 17–11, 15–15
Pts: Beckford 17; Rebs: Ahrens 10; Asts: Charles 5		Pts: Fennell 18; Rebs: Furphy 7 Asts: Siulepa 3

Vaudoise Aréna, Lausanne
Attendance: 2,111
Referees: Boris Krejić (SLO), Carlos Vélez (COL), Ahmed Al-Shuwaili (IRQ)

=== Third place game ===
6 July 2025
17:00

Boxscore

New Zealand	87–91	Slovenia
Scoring by quarter: 19–26, 27–26, 18–23, 23–16
Pts: Jones 21; Rebs: Hopoi 8 Asts: Ball 5		Pts: Hrabar, Smrekar 20; Rebs: Kroflič 14; Asts: Kroflič 6

Vaudoise Aréna, Lausanne
Attendance: 4,559
Referees: Matthew Myers (USA), Ventsislav Velikov (BUL), Yann Davidson (MAD)

=== Final ===
6 July 2025
20:00

Boxscore

United States	109–76	Germany
Scoring by quarter: 24–23, 32–24, 28–10, 25–19
Pts: Johnson Jr. 15; Rebs: Johnson Jr. 10; Asts: Mandaquit 6		Pts: Steinbach 19; Rebs: Steinbach 7 Asts: Anderson 9

Vaudoise Aréna, Lausanne
Attendance: 7,234
Referees: Yohan Rosso (FRA), Luis Castillo (ESP), James Griguol (AUS)

== Final standings ==
Rank	Team	Record
1st place, gold medalist(s)	United States	7–0
2nd place, silver medalist(s)	Germany	6–1
3rd place, bronze medalist(s)	Slovenia	4–3
4th	New Zealand	4–3
5th	Canada	5–2
6th	Australia	4–3
7th	Israel	5–2
8th	Switzerland	3–4
9th	Serbia	4–3
10th	France	3–4
11th	Mali	3–4
12th	Argentina	3–4
13th	China	2–5
14th	Cameroon	1–6
15th	Dominican Republic	2–5
16th	Jordan	0–7

== Statistics and awards ==
=== Statistical leaders ===
==== Players ====
Points

Name	PPG
(Argentina) Tyler Kropp	21.7
(Dominican Republic) Lucas Morillo	20.0
(Israel) Omer Mayer	20.0
(Australia) Roman Siulepa	18.9
(Cameroon) Gedeon Basson	18.0

Rebounds

Name	RPG
(Cameroon) Amadou Seini	15.3
(Germany) Hannes Steinbach	13.0
(Israel) Ariel Sela	11.2
(Argentina) Tyler Kropp	9.7
(Mali) Youssouf Traoré	9.3
(Switzerland) Dayan Nessah	9.3

Assists

Name	APG
(Argentina) Thiago Sucatzky	6.9
(Germany) Jack Kayil	6.6
(Germany) Christian Anderson Jr.	6.6
(Dominican Republic) Danny Carbuccia	6.6
(United States) Mikel Brown Jr.	6.1

Blocks

Name	BPG
(China) Sinan Huan	5.0
(United States) Daniel Jacobsen	1.9
(Switzerland) Melvine Mbamen	1.9
(United States) Morez Johnson Jr.	1.7
(New Zealand) Julius Halaifonua	1.6
(Mali) Ladji Coulibaly	1.6
(Canada) Matthew Dann	1.6
(France) Noa Kouakou-Heugue	1.6

Steals

Name	SPG
(Argentina) Felipe Minzer	3.2
(Dominican Republic) Fernando De Los Santos	3.0
(United States) Caleb Holt	2.7
(Mali) Ibrahim Doumbia	2.6
(Israel) Ariel Sela	2.3

Efficiency

Name	EFFPG
(Germany) Hannes Steinbach	27.1
(Argentina) Tyler Kropp	24.7
(Mali) Youssouf Traoré	22.9
(Dominican Republic) Lucas Morillo	22.9
(Cameroon) Amadou Seini	22.0

==== Teams ====
Points

Team	PPG
United States	114.6
Canada	88.6
Germany	85.9
Dominican Republic	84.9
Serbia	84.0

Rebounds

Team	RPG
Cameroon	47.9
United States	47.1
Australia	46.1
Canada	46.0
New Zealand	45.7

Assists

Team	APG
United States	27.7
Germany	21.0
Argentina	20.7
France	20.6
Canada	19.7
Slovenia	19.7

Blocks

Team	BPG
China	6.7
Switzerland	6.1
United States	5.9
New Zealand	5.3
Canada	5.0

Steals

Team	SPG
United States	14.1
Mali	13.0
Dominican Republic	12.6
France	10.6
Argentina	10.4

Efficiency

Team	EFFPG
United States	147.4
Canada	101.4
Germany	101.3
Dominican Republic	92.9
New Zealand	89.9

=== Awards ===
The awards were announced on 6 July 2025.

All-Tournament Team
Guards	Forwards	Center
(Germany) Christian Anderson Jr. (United States) Mikel Brown Jr.	(Slovenia) Žak Smrekar (United States) AJ Dybantsa	(Germany) Hannes Steinbach
MVP: (United States) AJ Dybantsa

All-Second Team
(Canada) Jordan Charles (New Zealand) Tama Isaac	(Switzerland) Dayan Nessah (Australia) Roman Siulepa (Argentina) Tyler Kropp
Best defensive player: (United States) Jordan Smith Jr.
Rising star: (Slovenia) Danijel Radosavljević
