= Vaudoise Aréna =

Indoor arena in Prilly, Switzerland

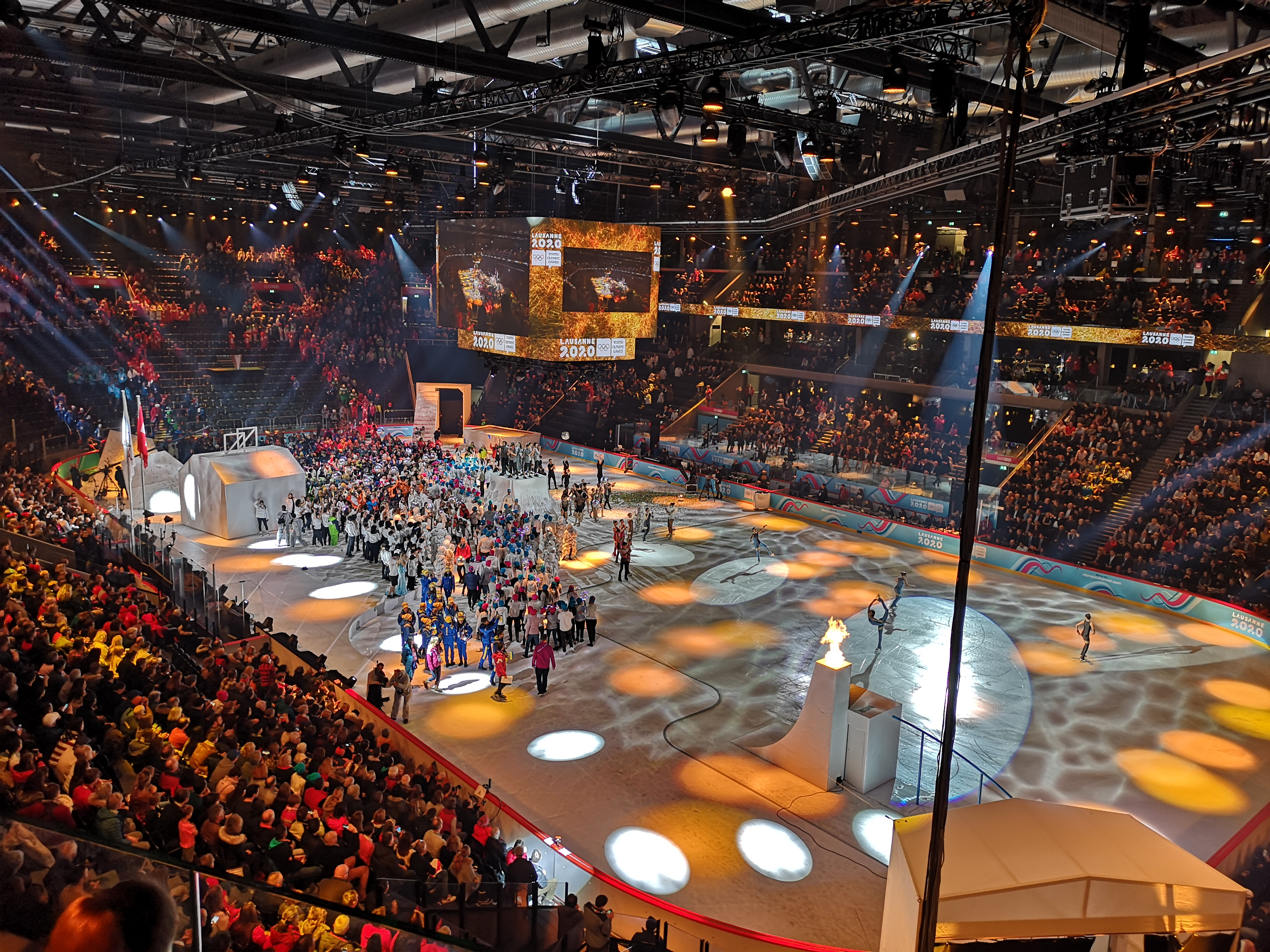
- 2020 Winter Youth Olympics opening ceremony
- Interactive map of Vaudoise Aréna
- Former names: Espace Malley
- Location: Prilly, Lausanne, Switzerland
- Coordinates: 46°31′43″N 6°36′0″E
- Owner: Center Sportif de Malley SA
- Operator: ASM Global
- Capacity: 9,600 seats (ice hockey); 12,000 seats (concerts)
- Surface: Versatile

Construction
- Opened: 24 September 2019
- Cost: CHF 229 million
- Architect: Pont12
- Project manager: Pär Bergman

Tenant
- Lausanne HC (NL) (2019–present)

Website
- vaudoisearena.ch

The Vaudoise Aréna (provisionally known as Espace Malley) is a multi-purpose indoor arena located in Prilly, a western suburb of Lausanne in Switzerland. Opened in September 2019, it was built on the site of the former, now demolished, CIG de Malley which it replaced to host the 2020 Winter Youth Olympics.

The arena serves as the home for Lausanne HC of the National League (NL).

== History ==
The facility was built for hosting the 2020 Winter Youth Olympics and is one of two venues that was intended to host the 2020 IIHF World Championship, though at a reduced capacity of 8,500. The complex includes three ice rinks (the main ice rink, a training field and an outdoor ice rink). The plans also include a fencing center, a table tennis hall and a swimming pool with three pools and 1,000 spectator seats that is scheduled for completion in 2021. Vaudoise Aréna is the center of the new Malley Sports Centre. Provisionally named Espace Malley, the facility adopted its final name in September 2018, after a sponsorship agreement with the insurance company Vaudoise assurances.

Local hockey clubs played in a temporary 6,700-seat ice rink (Malley 2.0), following the closure of Patinoire de Malley in 2017 and while construction work on the 9,600-seat Vaudoise Aréna took place. It was established as the largest temporary ice hockey arena in the world.

24 September 2019 saw its inaugural match of the 2019–20 NL season, which was between Lausanne and Genève-Servette HC. The Genevans won this Lemanic derby with a score of 5–3.

== Events ==
On 30 September 2019, Lausanne HC hosted the Philadelphia Flyers of the NHL for a gala match as part of the "2019 Global Series NHL Challenge". Leading 4–0 early in the second period, the Swiss team defeated the Pennsylvania franchise (4–3). The venue will host matches for the 2028 European Men's Handball Championship. It will also host matches for the 2025 FIBA Under-19 Basketball World Cup.

In July 2020, the Pétanque World Championships was supposed to be held at Vaudoise Aréna, but was cancelled due to the COVID-19 pandemic.

== See also ==
- List of indoor arenas in Switzerland

Preceded by Lysgårdsbakkene (opening); Håkons Hall (closing); Lillehammer	Winter Youth Olympics; Opening ceremony (Olympic Stadium); 2020	Succeeded by Gangneung Oval; Gangwon Province
