= Dayan Nessah =

Swiss basketball player

No. 0 – Loyola Chicago
- Position: Power forward
- League: Atlantic 10

Personal information
- Born: April 16, 2006 (age 20) Geneva, Switzerland
- Listed height: 6 ft 7 in (2.01 m)
- Listed weight: 220 lb (100 kg)

Career information
- High school: Lycée Français de Barcelone
- College: George Washington (2024–2025); Cleveland State (2025–); loyola Chicago men’s basketball (2026-2027)

Dayan Nessah (born 16 April 2006) is a Swiss basketball player who plays as a forward for the Loyola Chicago university and formerly for the George Washington Revolutionaries men's basketball team and FC Barcelona Bàsquet. He has competed for Swtizerland at the 2025 FIBA Under-19 Basketball World Cup and the 2024 FIBA U18 EuroBasket Division B and was named to the FIBA Under-19 Basketball World Cup All-Tournament Second Team. He was born in Geneva, has Cameroonian ancestry, stands 6 ft 7 in (2.01 m) and weighs 200 lb (91 kg).

Nessah attended high school at Lycee Francais de Barcelone. He spent five seasons in the FC Barcelona Development program before moving to the United States in 2024. Nessah was ranked as the number 12 prospect in Europe and the top prospect from Switzerland in his recruiting class.
