= Kyle Lofton =

American basketball player

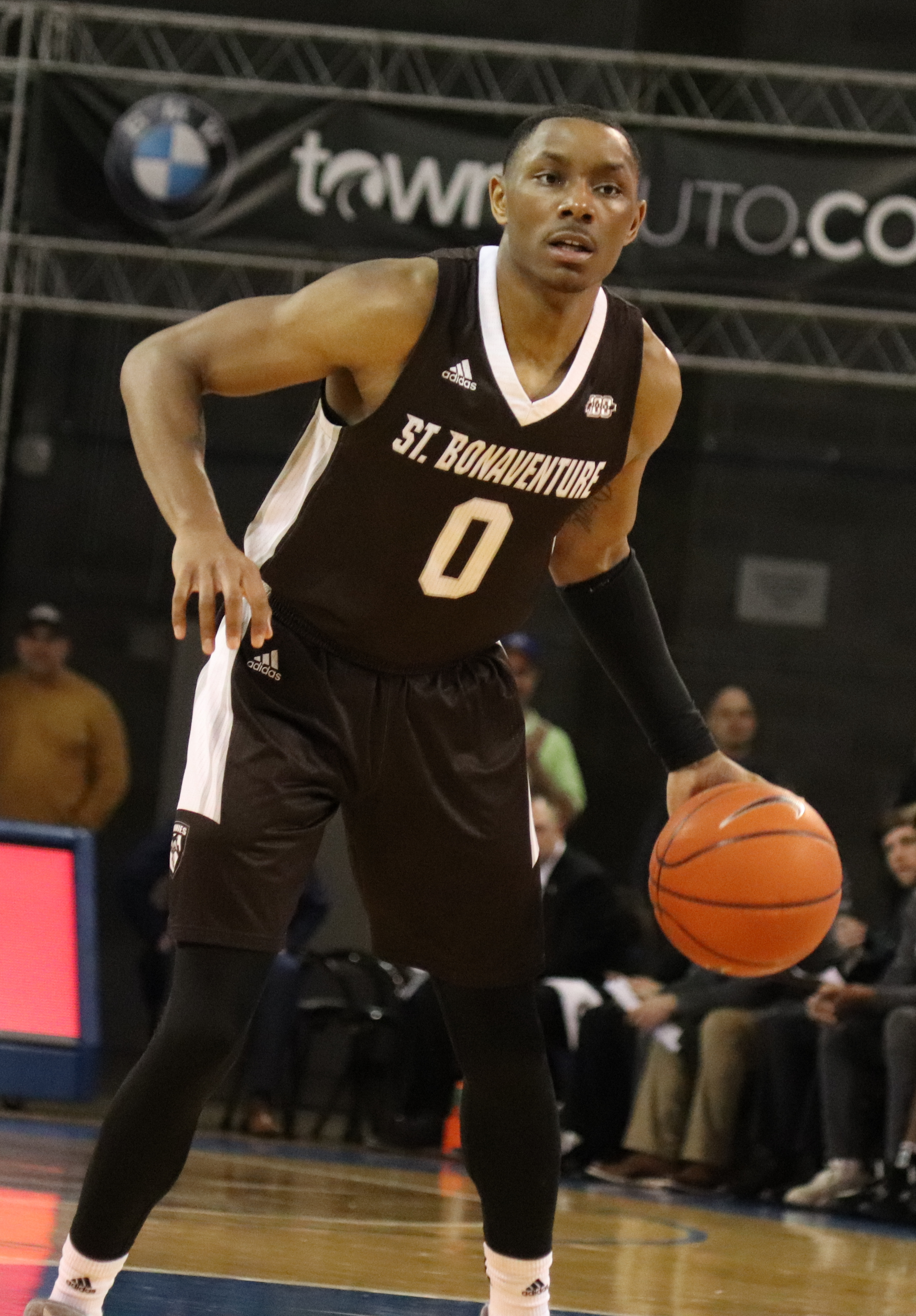
- Lofton with St. Bonaventure in 2019

No. 0 – MKS Dąbrowa Górnicza
- Position: Point guard
- League: PLK

Personal information
- Born: May 31, 1999 (age 27)
- Listed height: 6 ft 3 in (1.91 m)
- Listed weight: 188 lb (85 kg)

Career information
- High school: Union Catholic (Scotch Plains, New Jersey); Putnam Science Academy (Putnam, Connecticut)
- College: St. Bonaventure (2018–2022); Florida (2022–2023)
- NBA draft: 2023: undrafted
- Playing career: 2023–present

Career history
- 2023–2024: Kouvot
- 2024–2025: Bamberg
- 2025–2026: EWE Baskets Oldenburg
- 2026–present: MKS Dąbrowa Górnicza

Career highlights
- 2× First-team All-Atlantic 10 (2020, 2021); Atlantic 10 All-Rookie Team (2019)

Kyle K. Lofton (born May 31, 1999) is an American basketball player for MKS Dąbrowa Górnicza of the Polish Basketball League (PLK). He played college basketball for the Florida Gators and St. Bonaventure Bonnies.

== High school career ==
Raised in Hillside, New Jersey, Lofton attended Union Catholic Regional High School in Scotch Plains, New Jersey, receiving no NCAA Division I scholarship offers. He played a postgraduate season for Putnam Science Academy in Putnam, Connecticut and helped his team win its first National Prep Championship. He committed to playing college basketball for St. Bonaventure over offers from UMass, Quinnipiac and Robert Morris. He joined the program with his high school teammate Osun Osunniyi.

== College career ==
On February 17, 2019, Lofton recorded a freshman season-high 32 points and seven assists in a 79–56 win over George Mason. Three days later, he scored 18 points, including a game-winning pull-up jump shot with 10.7 remaining, in a 62–60 victory over La Salle. As a freshman, he averaged 14.4 points, 3.7 assists and 2.5 rebounds per game, earning Atlantic 10 All-Rookie and All-Tournament honors. On December 30, Lofton posted a sophomore season-high 32 points, eight assists and five rebounds in an 84–79 loss to Buffalo. As a sophomore, he averaged 14.1 points, six assists and 2.6 rebounds per game and was a First Team All-Atlantic 10 selection. On January 2, 2021, Lofton made a game-winning three-pointer with 2.8 seconds left as part of a 16-point performance in a 69–66 win over Richmond. As a junior, Lofton averaged 14.4 points, 5.5 assists, and 1.4 steals per game. He repeated on the First Team All-Atlantic 10. As a senior, Lofton was named to the Third Team All-Atlantic 10.

On May 13, 2022, Lofton transferred to Florida as a graduate student.

== Professional career ==
Loft on went undrafted in the 2023 NBA draft. He began his professional career with Kouvot in Finnish Korisliiga.

On August 11, 2025, he signed with EWE Baskets Oldenburg in the Basketball Bundesliga (BBL).

On August 10, 2026, he signed with MKS Dąbrowa Górnicza of the Polish Basketball League (PLK).

== Career statistics ==
Legend
GP	Games played	GS	Games started	MPG	Minutes per game
FG%	Field goal percentage	3P%	3-point field goal percentage	FT%	Free throw percentage
RPG	Rebounds per game	APG	Assists per game	SPG	Steals per game
BPG	Blocks per game	PPG	Points per game	**Bold**	Career high

=== College ===
Year	Team	GP	GS	MPG	FG%	3P%	FT%	RPG	APG	SPG	BPG	PPG
2018–19	St. Bonaventure	**34**	**34**	37.4	**.441**	.330	**.838**	2.5	3.7	1.4	**.1**	**14.4**
2019–20	St. Bonaventure	31	31	38.4	.422	**.336**	.806	2.6	**6.0**	1.4	**.1**	14.1
2020–21	St. Bonaventure	21	21	38.4	.414	.240	.813	3.5	5.5	1.4	**.1**	**14.4**
2021–22	St. Bonaventure	30	30	**38.5**	.402	.282	.820	**3.6**	5.9	**2.0**	**.1**	12.8
2022–23	Florida	31	30	32.4	.414	.288	.789	3.1	3.5	1.1	**.1**	8.7
Career		147	146	36.9	.420	.300	.815	3.0	4.8	1.5	.1	12.8
