= Eddy Edigin =

German basketball player

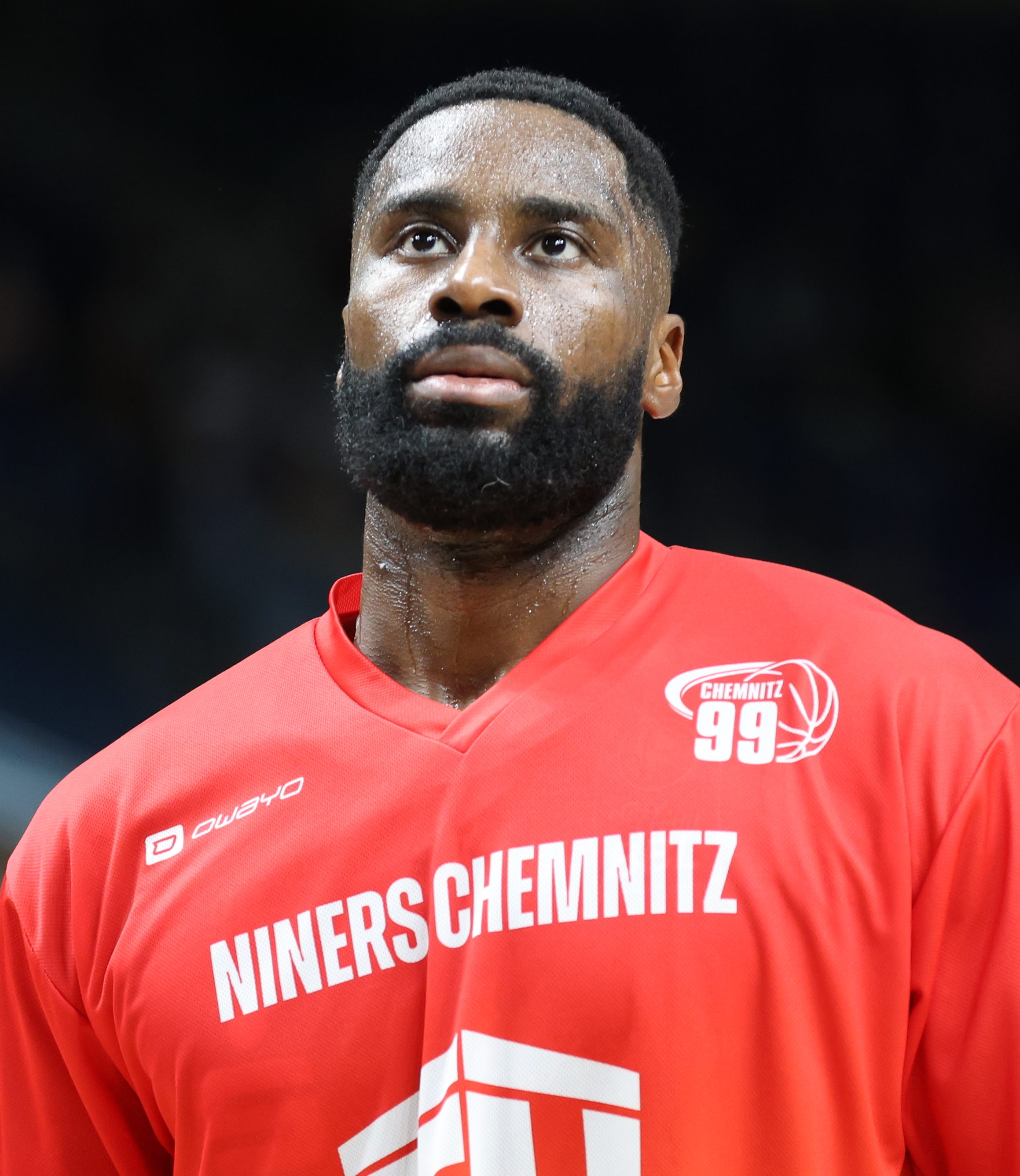
- Edigin in 2024

No. 27 – Basketball Löwen Braunschweig
- Position: Power forward / center
- League: Basketball Bundesliga

Personal information
- Born: 17 October 1995 (age 31) Lagos, Nigeria
- Listed height: 2.01 m (6 ft 7 in)
- Listed weight: 102 kg (225 lb)

Career information
- Playing career: 2016–present

Career history
- –2016: FC Bayern München II
- 2016–2017: Giants Nördlingen
- 2017–2019: 1. FC Baunach
- 2017–2018: Brose Bamberg
- 2019–2021: Bayer Giants Leverkusen
- 2021–2022: Hamburg Towers
- 2022–2024: MHP Riesen Ludwigsburg
- 2024–2025: Niners Chemnitz
- 2025: Mitteldeutscher BC
- 2025–2026: Würzburg Baskets
- 2026–present: Basketball Löwen Braunschweig

Career highlights
- Regionalliga Südost champion (2016)

Eddy Edigin junior (born October 17, 1995) is a German professional basketball player for Basketball Löwen Braunschweig of the German Basketball Bundesliga (BBL). He plays the power forward and center positions.

== Early life ==
Edigin was born in Lagos, Nigeria and moved to Germany in 2004, growing up in Regensburg. He began playing basketball at the age of 16 with the Regensburg Baskets before joining the youth ranks of FC Bayern München. He played for the club's second team and helped them win the 1. Regionalliga Südost in 2016.

== Professional career ==
In 2016, Edigin joined Giants Nördlingen in the German ProB league, where he averaged 11.2 points and 8.1 rebounds per game. His performance led to a move to 1. FC Baunach in the ProA for the 2017–18 season, and he also made his Bundesliga debut for Brose Bamberg in October 2017, appearing in six top-flight games.

In September 2018, he suffered a torn ACL, which sidelined him for the entire 2018–19 season. He resumed his career with Bayer Giants Leverkusen in 2019, where he played two seasons. In 2020–21, he averaged 9.6 points and 5.8 rebounds, helping Leverkusen reach the ProA finals and earning five double-doubles in 28 regular season games. He posted 7.0 points and 5.6 rebounds per game in the playoffs.

In July 2021, Edigin signed with Hamburg Towers of the BBL, playing 35 league games and 17 EuroCup games in 2021–22. He averaged 2.9 points per game in the Bundesliga and 3.1 in the EuroCup.

From 2022 to 2024, he played for MHP Riesen Ludwigsburg, increasing his league scoring average from 5.0 to 8.1 points between his two seasons. He then joined Niners Chemnitz for the 2024–25 season.

In March 2025, Edigin signed with Mitteldeutscher BC, continuing his career in the Bundesliga. He drew attention with strong performances, including a highlight assist featured in national media.

On June 24, 2025, he signed with Würzburg Baskets of the German Basketball Bundesliga (BBL).

On June 24, 2026, he signed with Basketball Löwen Braunschweig of the German Basketball Bundesliga (BBL).

== National team ==
Edigin, who has held German citizenship since 2010, was part of the German U20 national team squad in 2015.
