= Michael Weathers =

American basketball player

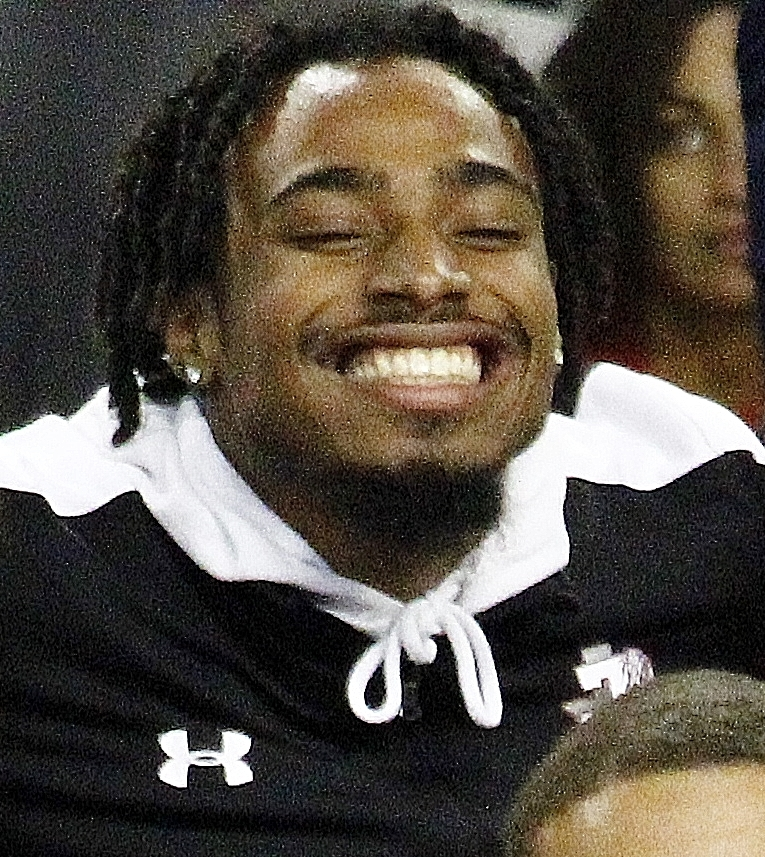
- Weathers with the Texas Southern Tigers in 2020

No. 20 – SLUC Nancy Basket
- Position: Guard
- League: LNB Élite

Personal information
- Born: August 5, 1997 (age 29) Roeland Park, Kansas, U.S.
- Listed height: 6 ft 3 in (1.91 m)
- Listed weight: 175 lb (79 kg)

Career information
- High school: Shawnee Mission North (Overland Park, Kansas)
- College: Miami (Ohio) (2016–2017); Oklahoma State (2018–2019); Texas Southern (2020–2021); SMU (2021–2022)
- NBA draft: 2022: undrafted
- Playing career: 2023–present

Career history
- 2023: Sutjeska
- 2023–2024: Klosterneuburg Dukes
- 2024–2026: MLP Academics Heidelberg
- 2026–present: SLUC Nancy Basket

Career highlights
- Austrian Basketball Superliga MVP (2024); First-team All-SWAC (2021); SWAC Newcomer of the Year (2021); SWAC tournament MVP (2021); MAC Freshman of the Year (2017); MAC All-Freshman team (2017)

Michael Kelvin Weathers (born August 5, 1997) is an American professional basketball player for SLUC Nancy Basket of the LNB Élite. He played college basketball for the Miami RedHawks, Oklahoma State Cowboys, Texas Southern Tigers and SMU Mustangs. Weathers was selected as the Austrian Basketball Superliga Most Valuable Player while playing for the Klosterneuburg Dukes in 2024.

== Early life and high school career ==
Weathers was born to Michael Weathers and Joann Loring. He has a fraternal twin brother, Marcus, who was born three minutes after him. Weathers' father played college basketball for the Drake Bulldogs. When Weathers was aged five, his father died of heart problems at the age of 40. Weathers' mother remarried Henry Loring, a former college football player for the Grambling State Tigers.

The Weathers brothers created a formidable duo while playing basketball at Shawnee Mission North High School in Overland Park, Kansas. They led their team to the Kansas state title as seniors after they made the final four the previous year. Weathers left Shawnee Mission North as the school's all-time leading scorer with 1,626 points; his brother finished second with 1,150.

=== Recruiting ===
Weathers was lightly recruited during his first years at high school. Prior to his senior year, he was contacted by Miami RedHawks coach John Cooper, who was a childhood fan of Weathers' father when he played at Southeast High School, but he turned down the offer as he stated he was looking in a different direction. Weathers began to receive individual interest during his senior year from college teams including the Creighton Bluejays, Nebraska Cornhuskers and SMU Mustangs but his mother encouraged him to stay with his brother and attend a college together. Although some colleges showed interest in signing both, concerns about their academics emerged and there was a delay of clearance by the National Collegiate Athletic Association (NCAA). Cooper and the RedHawks reemerged as an option with the offer of signing both brothers at the urging of an Amateur Athletic Union (AAU) coach who suggested that Cooper "look out for them." The brothers, who had improved their grades, committed to the RedHawks without making a visit to the campus. Weathers was considered a three-star prospect by Rivals.

== College career ==
=== Miami (Ohio) (2016–2017) ===
Weathers made his college basketball debut on November 12, 2016, with a 21-point performance against the Muskingum Fighting Muskies. He scored a career-high 31 points in a November 21, 2016, game against the Northern Kentucky Norse. Weathers averaged a team-high in points (16.7), assists (4.8), blocks (1.4) and steals (1.9); his rebounds (4.2) were third-best. He was named the Mid-American Conference Freshman of the Year for the 2016–17 season.

On March 28, 2017, Weathers announced that he and his brother would transfer from the RedHawks as they desired to play closer to home with a different opportunity. Weathers expressed an eagerness to play alongside his brother at another school but they would be open to separation if presented with individual options.

=== Oklahoma State (2017–2019) ===
On April 16, 2017, Weathers announced that he had committed to play for the Oklahoma State Cowboys. He followed former RedHawks coach Cooper, who had been hired by the Cowboys as an assistant coach. Marcus instead transferred to the Duquesne Dukes. Weathers sat out the 2017–18 season due to NCAA transfer rules.

Weathers was suspended indefinitely by the team on September 20, 2018, after he was charged with grand larceny. He had been arrested on September 9, 2018, when he stole a woman's wallet and purchased drinks at a bar using her debit card. On November 6, 2018, Weathers pleaded guilty to the misdemeanor charge of knowingly concealing stolen property while the felony charge of grand larceny was dismissed. He returned to the team on November 9, 2018.

On January 16, 2019, Weathers and teammates Maurice Calloo and Kentrevious Jones were dismissed by the Cowboys for a violation of team rules. He averaged 9.2 points and 2.1 assists in 16 games played for the Cowboys.

=== Texas Southern (2019–2021) ===
On August 20, 2019, Weathers announced that he would transfer to play for the Texas Southern Tigers.

Weathers made his debut for the Tigers on November 25, 2020, against the Washington State Cougars and scored 10 points. On March 6, 2021, Weathers scored a season-high 28 points in a victory over the Southern Jaguars. He was named the Southwestern Athletic Conference (SWAC) Newcomer of the Year and was named to the first-team All-SWAC at the conclusion of the regular season. Weathers set a new season-high with 30 points to defeat Jackson State in the semifinal of the 2021 SWAC tournament. He hit a game-tying three-pointer at the end of regulation as well as a three-pointer to give the Tigers a one-point lead in the final seconds of overtime. On March 13, 2021, Weathers scored 13 points as the Tigers defeated the Prairie View A&M Panthers to become SWAC Tournament champions and was named Tournament MVP. The Tigers qualified for the 2021 NCAA Division I men's basketball tournament where they were eliminated in the first round by the Michigan Wolverines; Weathers scored 24 points in his final game for the Tigers.

=== SMU (2021–2022) ===
Weathers transferred to play for the SMU Mustangs for his final season of college eligibility. The move reunited him with his brother Marcus, who transferred from Duquesne, and his former coach John Cooper, who serves as an assistant for the Mustangs.

On February 16, 2022, Weathers scored a season-high 22 points in a loss to the Temple Owls.

== Professional career ==
Weathers was selected by the Oklahoma City Blue as the eighth overall pick in the 2022 NBA G League draft.

On February 2, 2023, Weathers signed with Sutjeska of the Prva A Liga. He averaged 15.2 points, 4.1 rebounds and 1.9 assists in 10 games played. Sutjeska qualified for the semifinals but the club was unable to keep Weathers and he departed in May 2023.

On July 12, 2023, Weathers signed with the Klosterneuburg Dukes of the Austrian Basketball Superliga. He averaged 22.5 points, 7.1 rebounds and 4.3 assists while he led the league in efficiency. Weathers was subsequently selected as the Most Valuable Player for the 2023–24 season.

On July 4, 2024, Weathers signed with MLP Academics Heidelberg of the Basketball Bundesliga. On October 30, Weathers received a Hoops Agents Player of the Week award for Round 6 after he recorded 17 points, 4 rebounds and 5 assists in a win. On March 20, 2025, Weathers re-signed with Heidelberg. On June 15, Heidelberg signed Weathers' brother Marcus to reunite the brothers for the first time since college.

On July 8, 2026, Weathers signed with SLUC Nancy Basket of the LNB Pro A.

== Career statistics ==
Legend
GP	Games played	GS	Games started	MPG	Minutes per game
FG%	Field goal percentage	3P%	3-point field goal percentage	FT%	Free throw percentage
RPG	Rebounds per game	APG	Assists per game	SPG	Steals per game
BPG	Blocks per game	PPG	Points per game	**Bold**	Career high

=== College ===
Year	Team	GP	GS	MPG	FG%	3P%	FT%	RPG	APG	SPG	BPG	PPG
2016–17	Miami (OH)	**32**	**28**	28.3	.431	.221	.777	4.2	**4.8**	1.9	1.4	**16.7**
2018–19	Oklahoma State	16	0	20.5	.442	.222	.627	2.8	2.1	1.1	.4	9.2
2020–21	Texas Southern	24	24	**31.2**	**.478**	.306	.795	5.2	3.5	**2.1**	1.0	16.5
2021–22	SMU	31	19	26.8	.470	**.400**	**.798**	**5.9**	2.2	1.6	**1.5**	11.0
Career		103	71	27.3	.454	.284	.769	4.7	3.3	1.7	1.2	13.8

== Personal life ==
On April 12, 2022, Weathers' mother, Joann Loring, died aged 55 after a battle with a rare form of leukemia.
