= Michael Devoe =

American basketball player (born 1999)

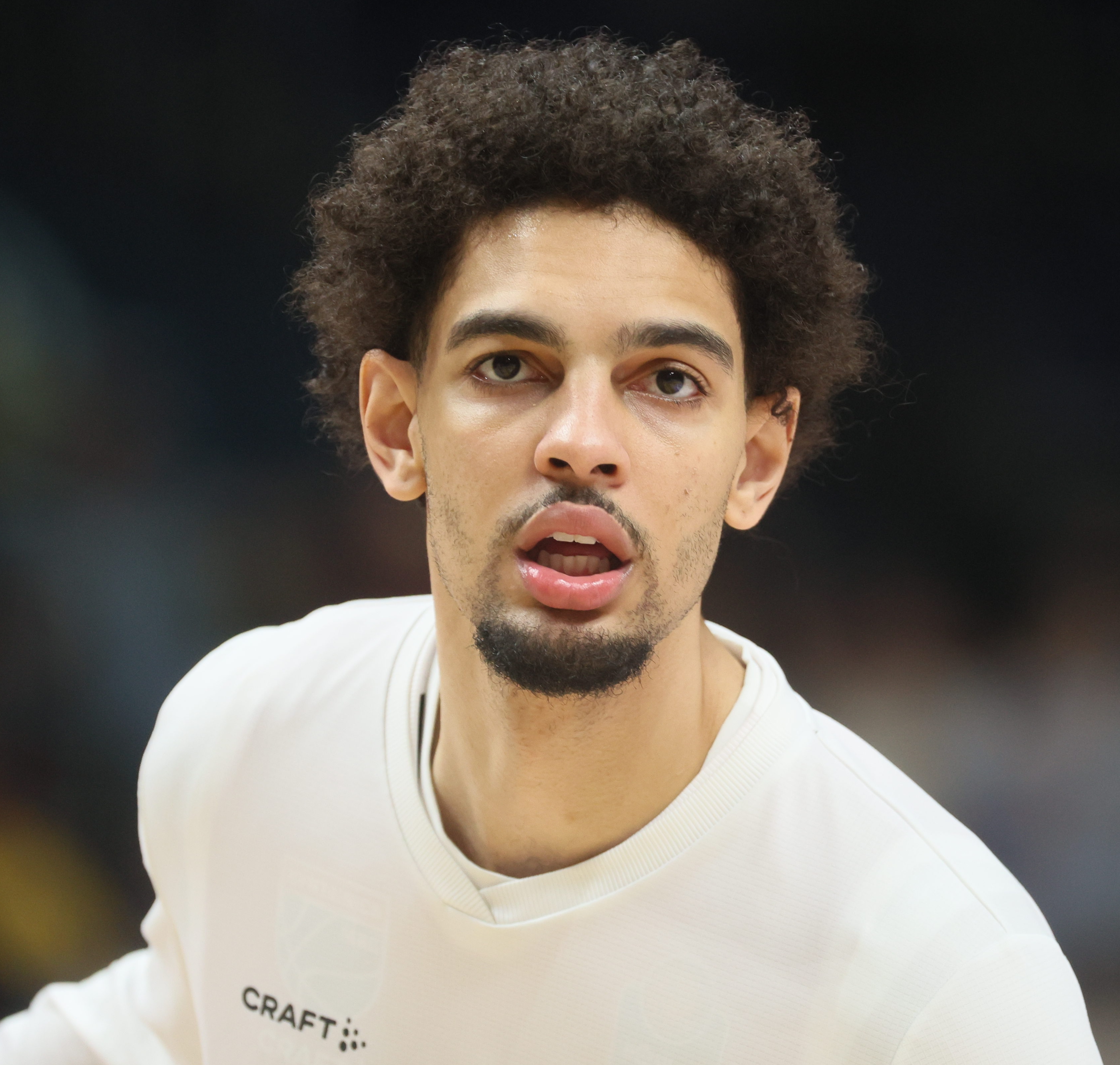
- Devoe in 2025

No. 0 – Rytas Vilnius
- Position: Shooting guard
- League: LKL; BCL

Personal information
- Born: December 17, 1999 (age 26) Orlando, Florida, U.S.
- Listed height: 6 ft 4 in (1.93 m)
- Listed weight: 183 lb (83 kg)

Career information
- High school: Oak Ridge (Orlando, Florida); Montverde Academy (Montverde, Florida)
- College: Georgia Tech (2018–2022)
- NBA draft: 2022: undrafted
- Playing career: 2022–present

Career history
- 2022–2023: Ontario Clippers
- 2023–2024: Salt Lake City Stars
- 2024: Memphis Hustle
- 2024: Maccabi Ironi Ramat Gan
- 2024–2025: Mitteldeutscher BC
- 2025–2026: Türk Telekom
- 2026–present: Rytas Vilnius

Career highlights
- German Cup winner (2025); German Cup MVP (2025); Third-team All-ACC (2022); ACC tournament MVP (2021)
- Stats at NBA.com
- Stats at Basketball Reference

Michael Jaden Devoe (born December 17, 1999) is an American professional basketball player for Rytas Vilnius of the Lithuanian Basketball League (LKL) and the Basketball Champions League (BCL). He played college basketball for the Georgia Tech Yellow Jackets.

== Early life ==
Devoe began playing competitive basketball at age nine. For three years, he played for Oak Ridge High School in Orlando, Florida. As a junior, Devoe averaged 22.4 points, 6.9 rebounds and 4.8 assists per game. For his senior season, he transferred to Montverde Academy in Montverde, Florida. He was teammates with RJ Barrett, Filip Petrušev and Andrew Nembhard. Devoe helped Montverde achieve a 35–0 record and win the High School Nationals title. A consensus four-star recruit, he committed to playing college basketball for Georgia Tech over offers from USC and Wake Forest.

== College career ==
As a freshman at Georgia Tech, Devoe averaged 9.7 points per game. On November 20, 2019, he recorded a season-high 34 points and nine rebounds in an 82–78 loss to Georgia. Devoe averaged 16 points, 3.9 rebounds and 3.4 assists per game in his sophomore season, earning All-Atlantic Coast Conference (ACC) honorable mention. On February 20, 2021, he scored a junior season-high 29 points, shooting 7-of-11 from three-point range, in an 87–60 win over Miami (Florida). He was named ACC tournament MVP after leading Georgia Tech to its first title since 1993. As a junior, Devoe averaged 15 points, 4.3 rebounds and 3.3 assists per game, repeating on the All-ACC honorable mention. After the season, he declared for the 2021 NBA draft while maintaining his college eligibility, but ultimately returned to Georgia Tech. On November 20, 2021, Devoe scored a career-high 37 points in a 88–78 win over Georgia. He was named to the Third Team All-ACC as a senior.

== Professional career ==
=== Ontario Clippers (2022–2023) ===
On October 24, 2022, Devoe joined the Ontario Clippers training camp roster.

On June 8, 2023, Devoe was selected by the Rip City Remix in the 2023–24 NBA G League Expansion Draft

=== Salt Lake City Stars (2023–2024) ===
On September 14, 2023, Devoe's rights were traded to the Salt Lake City Stars. On October 11, he signed with the Utah Jazz, but was waived six days later. On October 30, he joined the Stars.

=== Memphis Hustle (2024) ===
On January 26, 2024, Devoe was traded to the Memphis Hustle for a 2024 first-round pick.

=== Maccabi Ironi Ramat Gan (2024) ===
On May 12, 2024, Devoe signed with Maccabi Ironi Ramat Gan of the Ligat HaAl.

=== Mitteldeutscher BC (2024–2025) ===
On August 3, 2024, Devoe signed with Mitteldeutscher BC of the Basketball Bundesliga. He guided MBC to their first BBL-Pokal championship, and was named MVP, after scoring 27 points in the final against Bamberg.

=== Türk Telekom (2025–2026) ===
On July 1, 2025, he signed with Türk Telekom of the Turkish Basketbol Süper Ligi (BSL).

=== Rytas Vilnius (2026–present) ===
On July 27, 2026, Devoe signed one–year contract with Rytas Vilnius of the Lithuanian Basketball League (LKL) and the Basketball Champions League (BCL).

== Career statistics ==
Legend
GP	Games played	GS	Games started	MPG	Minutes per game
FG%	Field goal percentage	3P%	3-point field goal percentage	FT%	Free throw percentage
RPG	Rebounds per game	APG	Assists per game	SPG	Steals per game
BPG	Blocks per game	PPG	Points per game	**Bold**	Career high

=== College ===
Year	Team	GP	GS	MPG	FG%	3P%	FT%	RPG	APG	SPG	BPG	PPG
2018–19	Georgia Tech	**32**	23	32.2	.401	.393	.710	3.3	2.5	**1.4**	**.5**	9.7
2019–20	Georgia Tech	28	28	**35.1**	**.476**	**.427**	.750	3.9	**3.4**	1.2	.1	16.0
2020–21	Georgia Tech	26	26	35.0	.455	.400	**.753**	4.3	3.3	1.3	.3	15.0
2021–22	Georgia Tech	31	**29**	34.5	.462	.365	.733	**4.9**	3.1	**1.4**	.4	**17.9**
Career		117	106	34.1	.452	.393	.736	4.1	3.1	1.3	.3	14.6
