= KeyShawn Feazell =

American basketball player (born 1998)

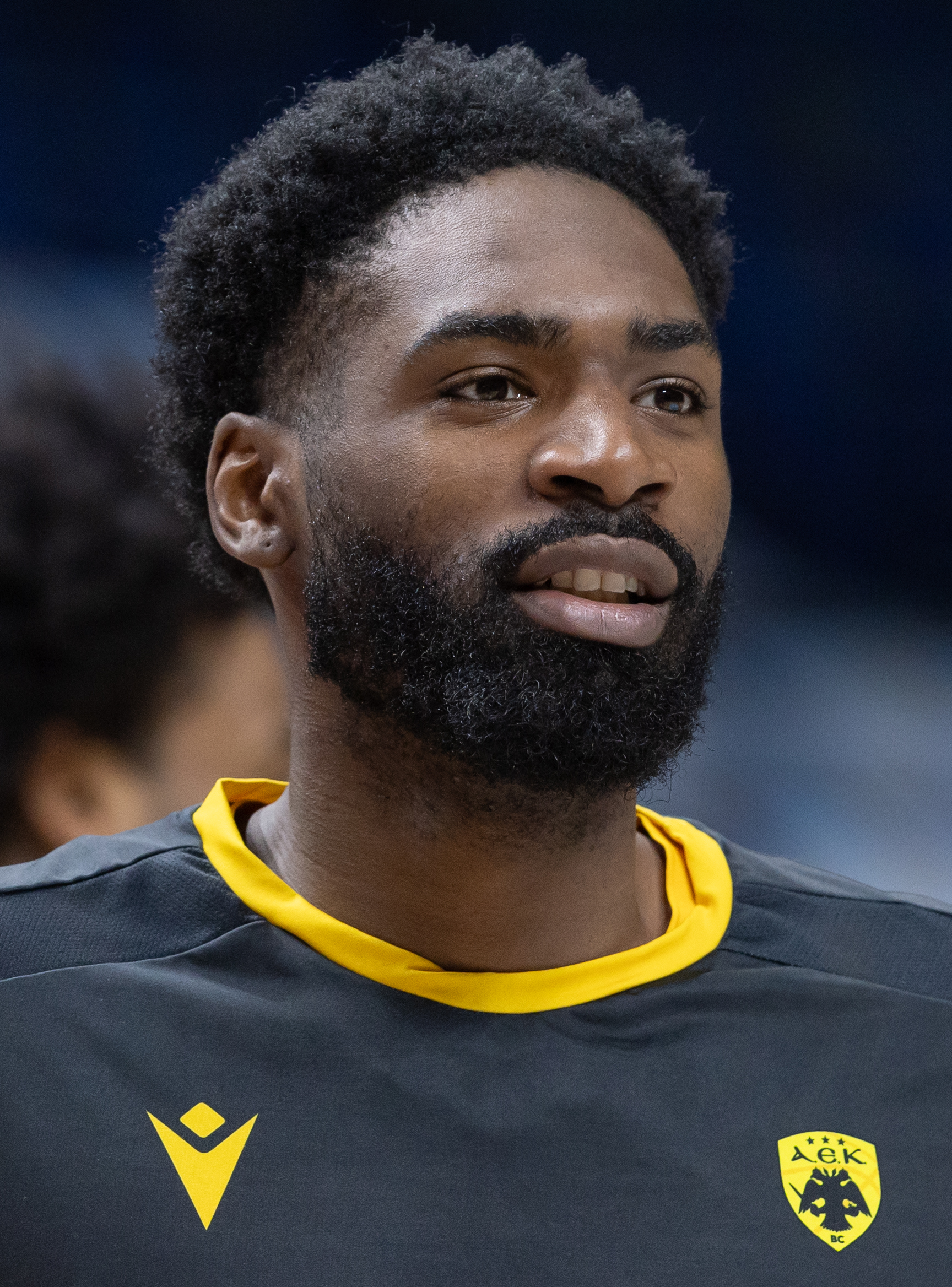
- Feazell in 2026

No. 8 – AEK Athens
- Position: Center / power forward
- League: Greek Basketball League

Personal information
- Born: October 23, 1998 (age 28) Hattiesburg, Mississippi, U.S.
- Listed height: 6 ft 10 in (2.08 m)
- Listed weight: 238 lb (108 kg)

Career information
- High school: Lawrence County (Monticello, Mississippi)
- College: Mississippi State (2017–2020); McNeese (2020–2021); Creighton (2021–2022)
- NBA draft: 2022: undrafted
- Playing career: 2022–present

Career history
- 2022–2023: Vilpas Vikings
- 2023: Marineros de Puerto Plata
- 2023–2024: CSO Voluntari
- 2024–2025: Bamberg
- 2025: Maccabi Ironi Ramat Gan
- 2025: Kuwait SC
- 2025–2026: ERA Nymburk
- 2026–present: AEK Athens

KeyShawn Maklik Feazell (born October 23, 1998) is an American professional basketball player for AEK Athens of the Greek Basketball League. He played college basketball for Mississippi State Bulldogs, McNeese State Cowboys and Creighton Bluejays.

== Early life and high school career ==
Feazell grew up in Monticello, Mississippi and attended Lawrence County High School.

== College career ==
Feazell began his college basketball career with the Mississippi State Bulldogs and stayed with the team for three seasons. During his tenure with the Bulldogs, he saw limited playing time and was mainly a role player off the bench.

After three years with the Bulldogs, he was transferred to McNeese State Cowboys, where he became a starter.

For his final college season, Feazell played with Creighton.

== Professional career ==
After going undrafted in the 2022 NBA draft, Feazell joined Vilpas Vikings of the Finnish Korisliiga. On May 3, 2022, he joined Marineros de Puerto Plata of the LNB.

On June 27, 2023, Feazell joined CSO Voluntari of the Liga Națională.

For the 2024-25 season, Feazell joined Bamberg of the BBL. On April 23, 2025, he left Bamberg and joined Maccabi Ironi Ramat Gan. During the summer, Feazell also played with Kuwait SC, for a short stint.

On October 16, 2025, he joined ERA Nymburk. On January 14, 2026, Feazell signed with Greek club AEK Athens, until the end of the current season with an option to extend for the next season.
