= Hannes Steinbach =

German basketball player (born 2006)

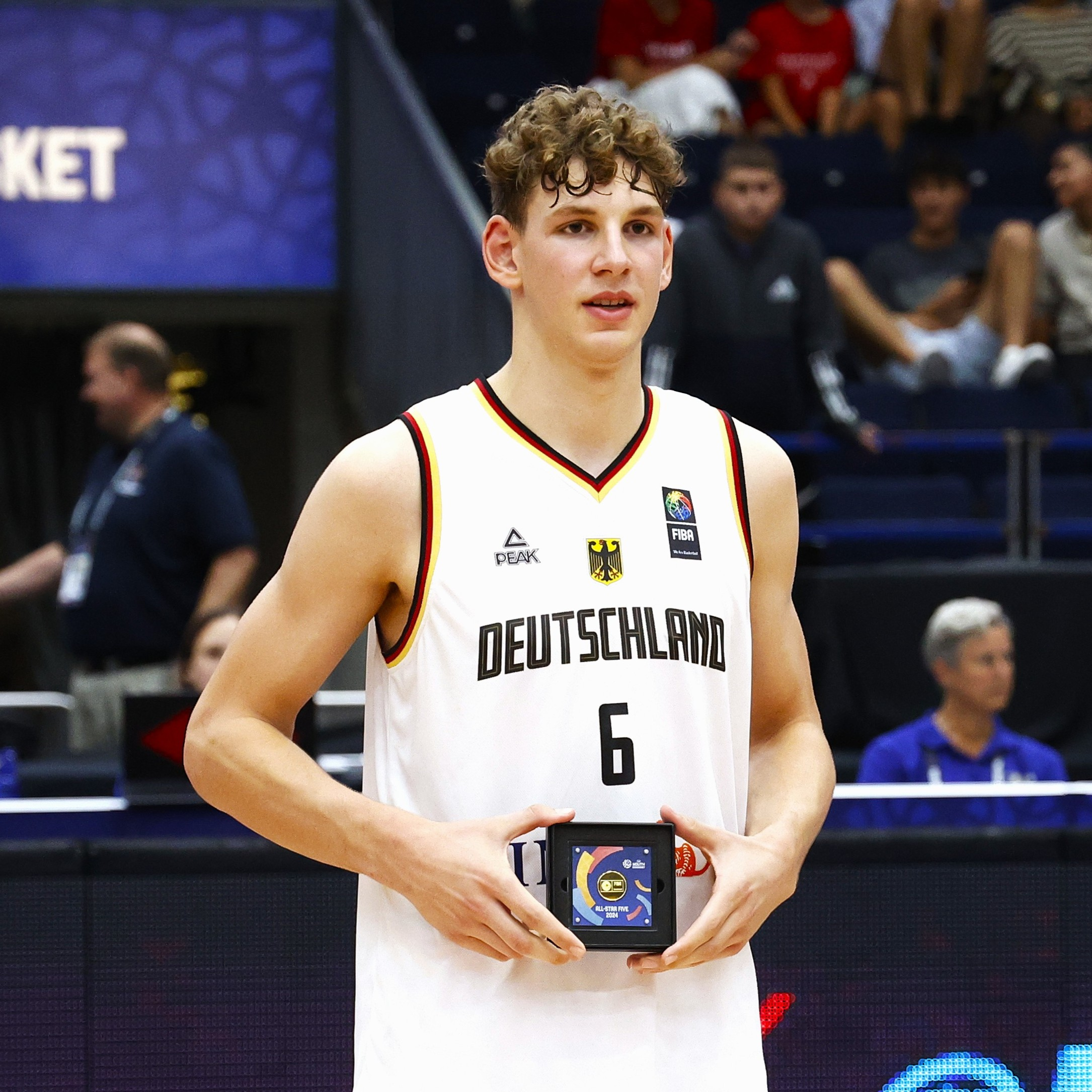
- Hannes Steinbach at the 2024 U18 EuroBasket

No. 22 – Charlotte Hornets
- Position: Power forward
- League: NBA

Personal information
- Born: 1 May 2006 (age 20) Würzburg, Germany
- Listed height: 6 ft 10 in (2.08 m)
- Listed weight: 248 lb (112 kg)

Career information
- College: Washington (2025–2026)
- NBA draft: 2026: 1st round, 14th overall pick
- Drafted by: Charlotte Hornets
- Playing career: 2024–present

Career history
- 2024–2025: Würzburg Baskets
- 2026–present: Charlotte Hornets
- 2026: →Greensboro Swarm

Career highlights
- NCAA rebounding leader (2026); Third-team All-Big Ten (2026); Big Ten All-Freshman Team (2026)
- Stats at NBA.com
- Stats at Basketball Reference
Medals
Men's basketball
Representing Germany
FIBA U19 World Cup
Silver medal – second place	2025 Switzerland	Team
FIBA U18 EuroBasket
Gold medal – first place	2024 Finland	Team
Bronze medal – third place	2023 Serbia	Team
AST World Under-18 Tournament
Bronze medal – third place	2024 Germany	Team

Hannes Steinbach (born 1 May 2006) is a German basketball player for the Charlotte Hornets of the National Basketball Association (NBA). He played college basketball for the Washington Huskies.

== Early life and career ==
The son of former Würzburg Bundesliga player Burkhard Steinbach, he went through the Würzburg Baskets youth program, and was also coached by his father for a time. With the Würzburg men's second team, he was promoted to the 2nd Bundesliga ProB in 2024 as champions of the 1st Regionalliga Süd-Ost (South-East Regional League). In the summer of 2024, Steinbach signed his first professional contract with Würzburg, and he made his debut in the Basketball Bundesliga at the end of September 2024.

In April 2025, Steinbach announced his decision to move to the United States for the 2025–26 season, to attend the University of Washington, following the path of other well-known Germans (Detlef Schrempf, Christian Welp, and Patrick Femerling). In the 2024–25 Bundesliga main round, Steinbach averaged 7.2 points and 5.8 rebounds in 31 appearances. In the subsequent ten games of the quarter-final and semi-final series for the German championship, he increased his averages to 14.8 points and 10.4 rebounds per game.

== College career ==
As a freshman, Steinbach averaged 18.5 points and 11.8 rebounds per game while shooting over 57% from the field. He was named to the third-team All-Big Ten and the Big Ten All-Freshman Team. Steinbach declared for the 2026 NBA draft following the season.

== Professional career ==
On June 23, 2026, Steinbach was selected with the fourteenth overall pick by the Charlotte Hornets in the 2026 NBA Draft.

== National team career ==
Steinbach was selected to represent Germany for the first time at the youth level in 2023, where he helped the Germany U18 national team win bronze. In April 2024, he helped the U18 team win bronze at the Albert Schweitzer Tournament. A few months later, Steinbach was dominant at the 2024 FIBA U18 EuroBasket, helping Germany win their first title at the U18 level, averaging 15.4 points and 12.7 rebounds per game, while also being named to the tournament's All-Star Five.

In July 2025, Steinbach helped Germany reach the final of the 2025 FIBA U19 World Cup, where they lost to the United States. Throughout the competition, Steinbach was the best German player in several statistical categories at the U19 World Cup, averaging 17.4 points and 13 rebounds per game, while earning a spot on the tournament's All-Star Five.

== Personal life ==
Steinbach's father Burkhard is a retired basketball player who played with Dirk Nowitzki during his time at DJK Würzburg.

== Career statistics ==
Legend
GP	Games played	GS	Games started	MPG	Minutes per game
FG%	Field goal percentage	3P%	3-point field goal percentage	FT%	Free throw percentage
RPG	Rebounds per game	APG	Assists per game	SPG	Steals per game
BPG	Blocks per game	PPG	Points per game	**Bold**	Career high
*	Led the league

=== College ===
Year	Team	GP	GS	MPG	FG%	3P%	FT%	RPG	APG	SPG	BPG	PPG
2025–26	Washington	30	30	34.6	.577	.340	.759	11.8*	1.6	1.1	1.2	18.5
