= Kenneth Cooper (cricketer) =

English cricketer

Personal information
- Full name: Kenneth Edward Cooper
- Born: 13 July 1883; Bromley, Kent, England
- Died: 26 February 1969 (aged 85); Málaga, Andalusia, Spain
- Batting: Unknown
- Bowling: Unknown

Domestic team information
- Years: Team
- 1908/09–1922/23: Europeans

Career statistics
Competition	First-class
Matches	18
Runs scored	327
Batting average	13.08
100s/50s	–/2
Top score	55*
Balls bowled	545
Wickets	11
Bowling average	21.90
5 wickets in innings	–
10 wickets in match	–
Best bowling	3/24
Catches/stumpings	19/–
- Source: ESPNcricinfo, 30 November 2022

Kenneth Edward Cooper MC (13 July 1883 — 26 February 1969) was an English first-class cricketer and an officer in the British Indian Army.

Cooper was born at Bromley in July 1883. He was educated at Harrow School, from where he attended the Royal Military College, Sandhurst. He graduated in April 1903 as a second lieutenant into the Essex Regiment, with promotion to lieutenant in November 1907, at which point he had been transferred to the Mahratta Light Infantry of the British Indian Army. While serving in British India, he played first-class cricket for the Europeans cricket team from 1908 to 1922, making sixteen appearances. He also made an additional two appearances for England against India in 1915 and 1918. He scored 327 runs in his eighteen first-class matches, at an average of 13.08. His highest score was 55 not out, one of two half centuries he scored. With the ball, he took 11 wickets at a bowling average of 21.90, with best figures of 3 for 24.

Cooper gained promotion in the Mahratta's to captain in July 1912. Cooper served with the Mahratta's in the First World War, during which he was awarded the Military Cross for distinguished service in the field, in addition to being mentioned in dispatches for services during the Mesopotamian campaign in 1914 and 1915. In the final year of the war, he was promoted to major. Following the war, Cooper was appointed an acting lieutenant colonel in December 1919, covering the months of May and June 1919 when he commanded a battalion. He gained the rank in full in April 1929, before being placed on the unemployed list in February 1934 and retired in August of the same year. He returned to active service during the Second World War, before ceasing his war service in November 1944. Cooper died in Spain in February 1969.
