= Ken Cooper (cricketer) =

South African cricketer

Personal information
- Full name: Kenneth Raymond Cooper
- Born: 1 April 1954 (age 72); Durban, Natal, South Africa
- Batting: Right-handed
- Bowling: Right-arm fast-medium

Domestic team information
- Years: Team
- 1973/74–1985/86: Natal

Career statistics
Competition	FC	LA
Matches	70	41
Runs scored	867	154
Batting average	12.75	9.05
100s/50s	0/0	0/0
Top score	48	30*
Balls bowled	10,888	2,297
Wickets	186	61
Bowling average	26.73	22.90
5 wickets in innings	7	1
10 wickets in match	0	0
Best bowling	6/36	5/26
Catches/stumpings	41/–	11/–
- Source: Cricinfo, 26 April 2024

Kenneth Raymond Cooper (born 1 April 1954) is a former South African cricketer who played first-class cricket for Natal from 1973–74 to 1985–86.

Cooper had a long career as a pace bowler for Natal. His best first-class figures were 6 for 36 (and 2 for 4 in the second innings) when Natal beat the Arosa Sri Lanka team in 1982–83. His best figures in the Currie Cup were 6 for 69 against Transvaal in 1980–81, when he shared the pace attack for Natal with Vintcent van der Bijl and Mike Procter. He was chosen as one of the South African Cricket Annual Cricketers of the Year in 1981.
