= Charles Callison =

American basketball player

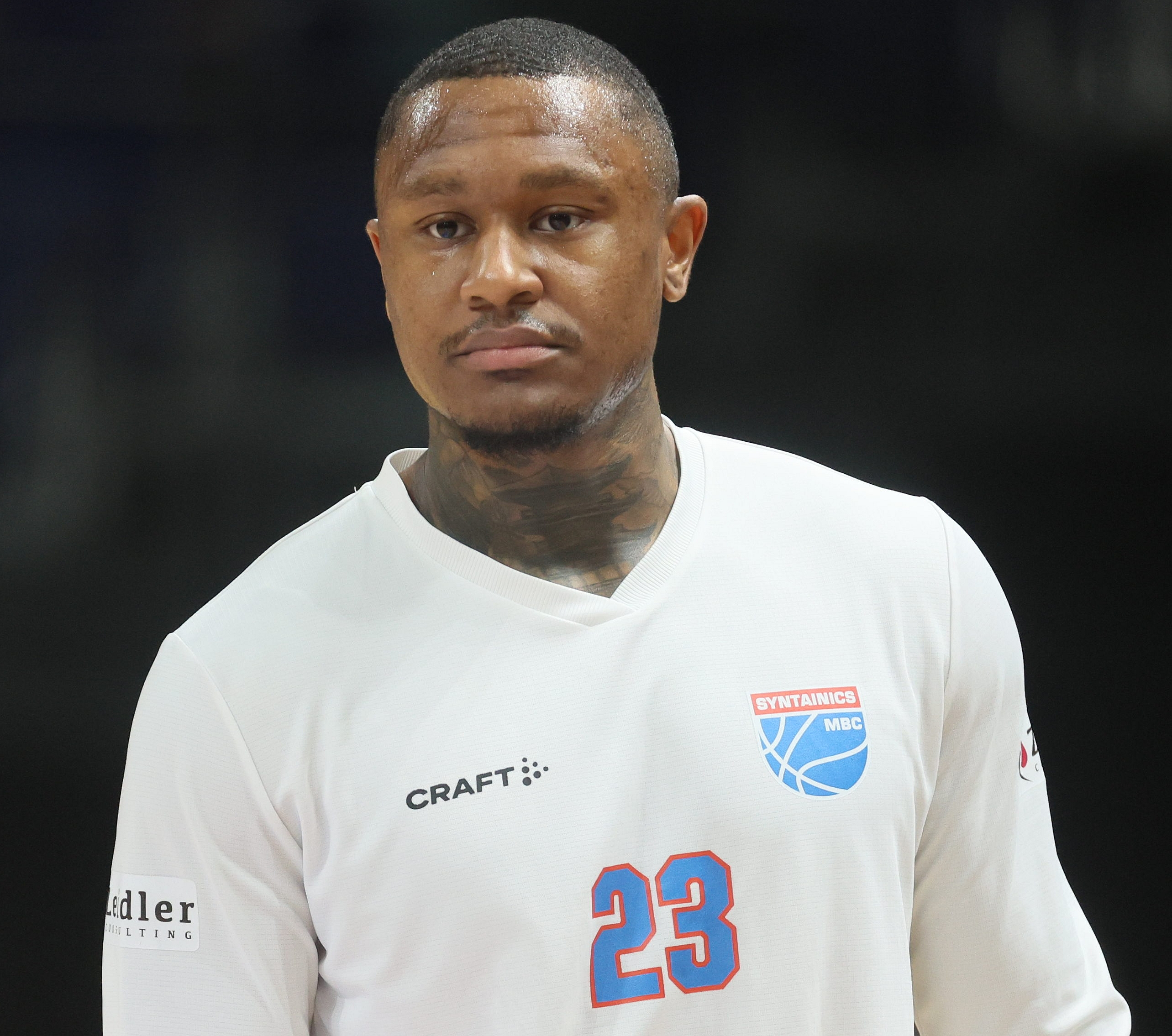
- Callison in 2025 with Mitteldeutscher BC

No. 23 – BC Enisey
- Position: Point guard
- League: VTB United League

Personal information
- Born: 17 October 1994 (age 32) Moreno Valley, California, United States
- Listed height: 6 ft 1 in (1.85 m)
- Listed weight: 185 lb (84 kg)

Career information
- College: Washington State University (2015–2017)
- Playing career: 2017–present

Career history
- 2017–2018: Alytus
- 2018–2019: Horsens
- 2019–2020: Södertälje Kings
- 2020–2021: Horsens
- 2021–2022: Odessa
- 2022: Donar Groningen
- 2022–2026: Mitteldeutscher
- 2026: Ironi Kiryat Ata
- 2026–present: Enisey Krasnoyarsk

Career highlights
- Danish Cup Winner (2019); German Cup Winner (2025)

Charles Callison (born October 17, 1994) is an American professional basketball player for Enisey Krasnoyarsk of the VTB United League. He plays the point guard position.

== Early life and college career ==
Callison was born in Moreno Valley, California. He began his collegiate basketball career at San Bernardino Valley College before transferring to Washington State University in 2015. Over two seasons with the Washington State Cougars, he played in 58 games, averaging 8.9 points, 1.7 rebounds, and 2.6 assists per game. In his senior year, he shot 45.6% from the field and 42.4% from three-point range.

== Professional career ==
After going undrafted in the 2017 NBA Draft, Callison began his professional career in Lithuania with BC Alytus. He then signed with Horsens IC in Denmark for the 2018–2019 season, averaging 15.6 points and 4.0 assists per game.

Callison played the 2019–2020 season with Södertälje Kings in Sweden before returning to Horsens IC for the 2020–2021 campaign. In 2021, he moved to Ukraine and joined BC Odessa, where he averaged 16.8 points and 4.6 assists over 28 games.

In 2022, Callison signed with Donar Groningen in the Netherlands, then joined SYNTAINICS MBC in the Basketball Bundesliga later that year. He was named team captain of SYNTAINICS MBC ahead of the 2023–2024 season. His leadership and on-court presence were credited with making a significant impact on the team's performance.

During the 2023–2024 BBL season with SYNTAINICS MBC, Callison averaged 12.6 points, 1.9 rebounds, and 3.9 assists per game.
