= Kenny Cooper (basketball) =

American basketball player

Free Agent
- Position: Point guard / Shooting guard

Personal information
- Born: August 14, 1998 (age 28) Nashville, Tennessee, U.S.
- Listed height: 6 ft 0 in (1.83 m)
- Listed weight: 180 lb (82 kg)

Career information
- High school: Franklin Road Academy (Nashville, Tennessee)
- College: Lipscomb (2016–2019); Western Kentucky (2020–2021); Tennessee State (2021–2022)

Career history
- 2023–2024: Tkibuli Orbi
- 2024–2025: Tigers Tübingen

Career highlights
- All-ASUN Conference Second Team (2019)

Kenneth Andrew Cooper (born August 14, 1998) is an American professional basketball player who last played for the Tigers Tübingen of the ProA league in Germany.

== Professional career ==
In July 2024, Cooper joined the Tigers Tübingen of the ProA.
