= FIBA Under-19 Basketball World Cup All-Tournament Team =

Youth basketball award

The FIBA Under-19 Basketball World Cup All-Tournament Team is a bi-annual award, that is given by FIBA, to the five best players of the FIBA Under-19 World Cup.

== Honourees ==
Year	First Team			Second Team			Ref.
Year	Player	Position	Team	Player	Position	Team	Ref.
2009	Toni Prostran	PG	Croatia	not awarded			
2009	Tyshawn Taylor	PG/SG	United States	not awarded			
2009	Nikos Pappas	SG/SF	Greece	not awarded			
2009	Gordon Hayward	SF	United States	not awarded			
2009	Mario Delaš	C	Croatia	not awarded			
2011	Aleksandar Cvetković	PG	Serbia	not awarded			
2011	Hugh Greenwood	PG/SG	Australia	not awarded			
2011	Jeremy Lamb	SG/SF	United States	not awarded			
2011	Dmitry Kulagin	SG/SF	Russia	not awarded			
2011	Jonas Valančiūnas	C	Lithuania	not awarded			
2013	Vasilije Micić	PG/SG	Serbia	not awarded			
2013	Dante Exum	PG/SG	Australia	not awarded			
2013	Aaron Gordon	PF	United States	not awarded			
2013	Dario Šarić	PF	Croatia	not awarded			
2013	Jahlil Okafor	C	United States	not awarded			
2015	Jalen Brunson	PG	United States	not awarded			
2015	Tyler Dorsey	SG	Greece	not awarded			
2015	Furkan Korkmaz	SG/SF	Turkey	not awarded			
2015	Harry Giles	PF	United States	not awarded			
2015	Marko Arapović	C	Croatia	not awarded			
2017	Payton Pritchard	PG	United States	not awarded			
2017	RJ Barrett	SG/SF	Canada	not awarded			
2017	Lorenzo Bucarelli	SG/SF	Italy	not awarded			
2017	Tommaso Oxilia	SG/SF	Italy	not awarded			
2017	Abu Kigab	SG/SF	Canada	not awarded			
2019	Siriman Kanouté	PG	Mali	not awarded			
2019	Joël Ayayi	PG/SG	France	not awarded			
2019	Tyrese Haliburton	SG	United States	not awarded			
2019	Reggie Perry	PF	United States	not awarded			
2019	Oumar Ballo	C	Mali	not awarded			
2021	Nikola Jović	SG	Serbia	not awarded			
2021	Jaden Ivey	SG	United States	not awarded			
2021	Victor Wembanyama	PF	France	not awarded			
2021	Chet Holmgren	PF	United States	not awarded			
2021	Zach Edey	C	Canada	not awarded			
2023	Mark Armstrong	PG	United States	Tan Yıldızoğlu	PG	Turkey	
2023	Jordi Rodríguez	SF	Spain	Melvin Ajinça	SF	France	
2023	Berke Büyüktuncel	SF	Turkey	Lee Aaliya	PF	Argentina	
2023	Zacharie Perrin	PF	France	Tobe Awaka	SF/PF	United States	
2023	Izan Almansa	PF	Spain	Yang Hansen	C	China	
2025	Christian Anderson Jr.	PG	Germany	Jordan Charles	PG	Canada	
2025	Mikel Brown Jr.	PG	United States	Tama Isaac	PG	New Zealand	
2025	Žak Smrekar	F	Slovenia	Dayan Nessah	F	Switzerland	
2025	AJ Dybantsa	SF	United States	Roman Siulepa	F	Australia	
2025	Hannes Steinbach	C	Germany	Tyler Kropp	PF	Argentina	
