= 2023 FIBA Under-19 Basketball World Cup =

2023-as FIBA U19-es kosárlabda-világbajnokság

Tournament details
- Host country: Hungary
- City: Debrecen
- Dates: 24 June – 2 July
- Teams: 16 (from 5 confederations)
- Venues: 2 (in 1 host city)

Final positions
- Champions: Spain (2nd title)
- Runners-up: France
- Third place: Turkey
- Fourth place: United States

Tournament statistics
- Games played: 56
- MVP: (Spain) Izan Almansa
- Top scorer: (Madagascar) Mathias M'Madi (24.1 points per game)

Official website
- www.fiba.basketball

The 2023 FIBA Under-19 Basketball World Cup was the 16th edition of the FIBA Under-19 Basketball World Cup, the biennial international men's youth basketball championship contested by the U19 national teams of the member associations of FIBA. The tournament was hosted in Debrecen, Hungary, from 24 June to 2 July 2023.

Spain won their second title after beating France in the final.

== Qualified teams ==
Means of qualification	Dates	Venue	Berths	Qualifiers
Host nation	31 January 2020	(Switzerland) Mies	1	Hungary
2022 FIBA Under-18 Americas Championship	6–12 June 2022	(Mexico) Tijuana	4	United States; Brazil; Canada; Argentina
2022 FIBA U18 European Championship	30 July–7 August 2022	(Turkey) İzmir	5	Spain; Turkey; Serbia; Slovenia; France
2022 FIBA U18 Asian Championship	21–28 August 2022	(Iran) Tehran	4	South Korea; Japan; China; Lebanon
2022 FIBA U18 African Championship	4–14 August 2022	(Madagascar) Antananarivo	2	Egypt; Madagascar
Total			16	

== Draw ==
The draw took place on 14 March 2023.

=== Seeding ===
On 9 March 2023, the pots were announced. Teams were distributed into the four pots based on sporting quality and geographical criteria.

Pot 1	Pot 2	Pot 3	Pot 4
United States; Brazil; Spain; Hungary	Turkey; Serbia; Slovenia; France	South Korea; Japan; China; Lebanon	Canada; Argentina; Egypt; Madagascar

== Preliminary round ==
All times are local (UTC+2).

=== Group A ===
Pos	Team	Pld	W	L	PF	PA	PD	Pts
1	Spain	3	3	0	254	199	+55	6
2	France	3	2	1	232	219	+13	5
3	Canada	3	1	2	212	242	−30	4
4	China	3	0	3	216	254	−38	3

Source: FIBA
Rules for classification: 1) Points; 2) Head-to-head results; 3) Points difference; 4) Points scored.

24 June 2023
19:30

Boxscore

France	83–63	China
Scoring by quarter: 17–18, 20–17, 21–19, 25–9
Pts: Ajinça 18; Rebs: Sarr 9 Asts: three players 4		Pts: Yang 14; Rebs: Wang 8 Asts: Wang 6

Oláh Gábor Utcai Sportcsarnok, Debrecen
Attendance: 110
Referees: Daniel García (VEN), Glenn Cornelio (PHI), Wael Mostafa (EGY)

24 June 2023
20:00

Boxscore

Canada	56–83	Spain
Scoring by quarter: 10–24, 13–18, 17–20, 16–21
Pts: Nwoko 18; Rebs: Fisher 7 Asts: Williamson 3		Pts: Almansa 17; Rebs: Almansa 8 Asts: three players 4

Főnix Hall, Debrecen
Attendance: 400
Referees: Oskars Lucis (LAT), Blanca Burns (USA), Péter Praksch (HUN)

25 June 2023
14:30

Boxscore

Spain	88–69	France
Scoring by quarter: 18–18, 27–13, 24–19, 19–19
Pts: Almansa 21; Rebs: Almansa 7 Asts: Langarita 7		Pts: Ajinça 17; Rebs: Perrin 8 Asts: Bouzidi 6

Oláh Gábor Utcai Sportcsarnok, Debrecen
Attendance: 0
Referees: Amy Bonner (USA), Beniamino Attard (ITA), Daigo Urushima (JPN),

25 June 2023
15:00

Boxscore

China	79–88	Canada
Scoring by quarter: 20–23, 8–18, 15–10, 36–37
Pts: Zhao 25; Rebs: Yang 15; Asts: Zhao 4		Pts: Lee 17; Rebs: Pitt 13; Asts: Fisher 4

Főnix Hall, Debrecen
Attendance: 200
Referees: Yener Yılmaz (TUR), Yevgeniy Mikheyev (KAZ), Rabah Noujaim (LBN)

27 June 2023
12:30

Boxscore

Canada	68–80	France
Scoring by quarter: 22–25, 21–18, 6–22, 19–15
Pts: Lee 15; Rebs: Nwoko 10; Asts: Hurley 4		Pts: Ajinça 23; Rebs: Perrin 15; Asts: Penda 5

Főnix Hall, Debrecen
Attendance: 150
Referees: Kristian Páez (ECU), Gizella Györgyi (ROU), Martin Horozov (BUL)

27 June 2023
12:30

Boxscore

China	74–83	Spain
Scoring by quarter: 25–24, 19–15, 16–22, 14–22
Pts: Wang J. 21; Rebs: Yang 9 Asts: Yahui 3		Pts: Almansa 24; Rebs: Miller 10; Asts: Miller 7

Oláh Gábor Utcai Sportcsarnok, Debrecen
Attendance: 70
Referees: Leonardo Zalazar (ARG), Péter Praksch (HUN), Arnold Moseya (RSA)

=== Group B ===
Pos	Team	Pld	W	L	PF	PA	PD	Pts
1	United States	3	3	0	335	211	+124	6
2	Slovenia	3	2	1	220	206	+14	5
3	Madagascar	3	1	2	223	276	−53	4
4	Lebanon	3	0	3	194	279	−85	3

Source: FIBA
Rules for classification: 1) Points; 2) Head-to-head results; 3) Points difference; 4) Points scored.

24 June 2023
12:00

Boxscore

Lebanon	58–74	Slovenia
Scoring by quarter: 13–22, 19–22, 9–13, 17–17
Pts: Mansour 20; Rebs: Zamatta 7 Asts: Sleiman 3		Pts: Vide 20; Rebs: Tratar 6 Asts: three players 3

Főnix Hall, Debrecen
Attendance: 0
Referees: Leonardo Zalazar (ARG), Park Kyoung-jin (KOR), Waseem Husainy (CAN)

24 June 2023
12:30

Boxscore

United States	136–69	Madagascar
Scoring by quarter: 29–19, 40–17, 29–16, 38–17
Pts: Johnson 21; Rebs: Biliew 8 Asts: Boswell 7		Pts: M'Madi 28; Rebs: Andriatsarafara, Rakotonanahary 4 Asts: Rakotonanahary 3

Oláh Gábor Utcai Sportcsarnok, Debrecen
Attendance: 500
Referees: Yu Jung (TPE), Gizella Györgyi (ROU), Arnold Moseya (RSA)

25 June 2023
19:30

Boxscore

Madagascar	83–66	Lebanon
Scoring by quarter: 24–12, 14–18, 22–6, 23–30
Pts: M'Madi 34; Rebs: Rabibsoa 15; Asts: Rakotonanahary 6		Pts: Rtail 19; Rebs: Zamatta 11; Asts: Abou 6

Oláh Gábor Utcai Sportcsarnok, Debrecen
Attendance: 0
Referees: Kristian Páez (ECU), Ariadna Chueca (ESP), Wael Mostafa (EGY)

25 June 2023
20:00

Boxscore

Slovenia	72–77	United States
Scoring by quarter: 19–16, 21–17, 21–19, 11–25
Pts: Macura 19; Rebs: Macura, Mivšek 5 Asts: Vide 6		Pts: Awaka 14; Rebs: Awaka 11; Asts: Johnson 3

Főnix Hall, Debrecen
Attendance: 1,000
Referees: Leonardo Zalazar (ARG), Péter Praksch (HUN), Carlos Vélez (COL)

27 June 2023
15:00

Boxscore

Lebanon	70–122	United States
Scoring by quarter: 20–39, 15–35, 21–22, 14–26
Pts: Sabaagh 13; Rebs: Assaf 9 Asts: four players 3		Pts: Armstrong 17; Rebs: Lubin 11; Asts: Jackson 5

Főnix Hall, Debrecen
Attendance: 400
Referees: Daniel García (VEN), Mohammad Taha (JOR), Glenn Cornelio (PHI)

27 June 2023
15:00

Boxscore

Madagascar	71–74	Slovenia
Scoring by quarter: 19–16, 15–22, 17–23, 20–13
Pts: M'Madi 16; Rebs: Rabibsoa 11; Asts: M'Madi 5		Pts: Vide 25; Rebs: Tratar 13; Asts: Zemljič 7

Oláh Gábor Utcai Sportcsarnok, Debrecen
Attendance: 103
Referees: Oskars Lucis (LAT), Park Kyoung-jin (KOR), Beniamino Attard (ITA)

=== Group C ===
Pos	Team	Pld	W	L	PF	PA	PD	Pts
1	Serbia	3	3	0	224	196	+28	6
2	Brazil	3	2	1	239	214	+25	5
3	Japan	3	1	2	220	240	−20	4
4	Egypt	3	0	3	196	229	−33	3

Source: FIBA
Rules for classification: 1) Points; 2) Head-to-head results; 3) Points difference; 4) Points scored.

24 June 2023
14:30

Boxscore

Serbia	74–59	Egypt
Scoring by quarter: 17–10, 25–17, 17–15, 15–17
Pts: Milijašević 16; Rebs: Ristić 9 Asts: Borovićanin 7		Pts: El-Shakery 17; Rebs: El-Shakery 13; Asts: El-Gizawy, Zahran 3

Oláh Gábor Utcai Sportcsarnok, Debrecen
Attendance: 60
Referees: Yener Yılmaz (TUR), Rabah Noujaim (LBN), Gvidas Gedvilas (LTU)

24 June 2023
15:00

Boxscore

Japan	73–94	Brazil
Scoring by quarter: 13–31, 22–22, 18–28, 20–13
Pts: Kawashima 30; Rebs: Wakugawa 12; Asts: Rudolph, Wakugawa 4		Pts: Santos 22; Rebs: Da Silva Brandão, Rodrigues 8 Asts: Landeira 5

Főnix Hall, Debrecen
Attendance: 200
Referees: Jenna Reneau (USA), Yevgeniy Mikheyev (KAZ), Beniamino Attard (ITA)

25 June 2023
12:00

Boxscore

Egypt	70–82	Japan
Scoring by quarter: 21–24, 13–23, 12–21, 24–14
Pts: Zahran 20; Rebs: El-Shakery 9 Asts: El-Gizawy 4		Pts: Jacobs 25; Rebs: Tajon 9 Asts: Okada 7

Oláh Gábor Utcai Sportcsarnok, Debrecen
Attendance: 50
Referees: Martin Horozov (BUL), Gizella Györgyi (ROU), Mohammad Taha (JOR)

25 June 2023
12:30

Boxscore

Brazil	72–74	Serbia
Scoring by quarter: 22–21, 15–21, 14–11, 21–21
Pts: Santos 18; Rebs: Cardoso 10; Asts: Da Silva Brandão 7		Pts: Milijašević 21; Rebs: Đoković 8 Asts: Milijašević 9

Főnix Hall, Debrecen
Attendance: 200
Referees: Daniel García (VEN), Gvidas Gedvilas (LTU), Yu Jung (TPE)

27 June 2023
20:00

Boxscore

Brazil	73–67	Egypt
Scoring by quarter: 26–15, 21–18, 4–14, 22–20
Pts: Cardoso 12; Rebs: Da Silva Brandão, Rodrigues 7 Asts: Da Silva Brandão 5		Pts: Zahran 16; Rebs: El-Shakery 9 Asts: El-Gizawy 6

Oláh Gábor Utcai Sportcsarnok, Debrecen
Attendance: 72
Referees: Jenna Reneau (USA), Krishna Domínguez (MEX), Ahmed Al-Shuwaili (IRQ)

27 June 2023
20:00

Boxscore

Serbia	76–65	Japan
Scoring by quarter: 22–20, 20–13, 14–26, 20–6
Pts: Đoković, Milijašević 17; Rebs: Đoković 9 Asts: Milijašević 4		Pts: Jacobs 16; Rebs: Jacobs 5 Asts: Okada 5

Főnix Hall, Debrecen
Attendance: 100
Referees: Yevgeniy Mikheyev (KAZ), Blanca Burns (USA), Waseem Husainy (CAN)

=== Group D ===
Pos	Team	Pld	W	L	PF	PA	PD	Pts
1	Turkey	3	3	0	260	207	+53	6
2	Hungary (H)	3	2	1	216	215	+1	5
3	Argentina	3	1	2	221	222	−1	4
4	South Korea	3	0	3	211	264	−53	3

Source: FIBA
Rules for classification: 1) Points; 2) Head-to-head results; 3) Points difference; 4) Points scored.
(H) Hosts

24 June 2023
17:00

Boxscore

Argentina	67–79	Turkey
Scoring by quarter: 11–15, 20–30, 19–22, 17–12
Pts: Giovannetti 15; Rebs: Trouet 11; Asts: Bordón 4		Pts: Yiğitoğlu 16; Rebs: Büyüktuncel 13; Asts: Sivas 4

Oláh Gábor Utcai Sportcsarnok, Debrecen
Attendance: 0
Referees: Amy Bonner (USA), Martin Horozov (BUL), Daigo Urushima (JPN)

24 June 2023
17:30

Boxscore

South Korea	59–85	Hungary
Scoring by quarter: 13–25, 20–15, 16–22, 10–23
Pts: Moon 15; Rebs: Lee Y. 5 Asts: Moon 3		Pts: Csátaljay 18; Rebs: Schmera 8 Asts: Meszlényi 7

Főnix Hall, Debrecen
Attendance: 600
Referees: Kristian Páez (ECU), Ariadna Chueca (ESP), Wissam Zein (SYR)

25 June 2023
17:00

Boxscore

Turkey	91–76	South Korea
Scoring by quarter: 22–17, 19–20, 21–22, 29–17
Pts: Büyüktuncel 15; Rebs: Büyüktuncel 13; Asts: Büyüktuncel 7		Pts: Moon 22; Rebs: Seok 8 Asts: Moon 5

Oláh Gábor Utcai Sportcsarnok, Debrecen
Attendance: 100
Referees: Oskars Lucis (LAT), Blanca Burns (USA), Krishna Domínguez (MEX)

25 June 2023
17:30

Boxscore

Hungary	67–66	Argentina
Scoring by quarter: 11–13, 20–20, 17–18, 19–15
Pts: Csendes 17; Rebs: Csuti 10; Asts: Csendes 5		Pts: Giovannetti 20; Rebs: Giovannetti 10; Asts: Bordon, Trouet 2

Főnix Hall, Debrecen
Attendance: 1,000
Referees: Jenna Reneau (USA), Waseem Husainy (CAN), Ahmed Al-Shuwaili (IRQ)

27 June 2023
17:30

Boxscore

Hungary	64–90	Turkey
Scoring by quarter: 14–27, 20–31, 15–10, 15–22
Pts: Csátaljay 17; Rebs: Csuti, Meszlényi 3 Asts: Csendes 5		Pts: Mestoğlu 18; Rebs: Büyüktuncel, Mestoğlu 5 Asts: Yıldızoğlu 9

Főnix Hall, Debrecen
Attendance: 1,600
Referees: Amy Bonner (USA), Gvidas Gedvilas (LTU), Carlos Vélez (COL)

27 June 2023
17:30

Boxscore

Argentina	88–76	South Korea
Scoring by quarter: 26–13, 18–19, 23–25, 21–19
Pts: Aaliya 25; Rebs: Aaliya 11; Asts: Bordon 8		Pts: Yun 21; Rebs: Ku 6 Asts: Kang S., Lee Y.

Oláh Gábor Utcai Sportcsarnok, Debrecen
Attendance: 55
Referees: Yu Jung (TPE), Ariadna Chueca (ESP), Wissam Zein (SYR)

== Knockout stage ==
=== Bracket ===
Round of 16
28 June
Spain	102
Lebanon	20
28 June
Brazil	85
Argentina	87
28 June
Canada	90
Slovenia	69
28 June
Egypt	53
Turkey	72
28 June
France	119
Madagascar	56
28 June
Serbia	115
South Korea	83
28 June
China	69
United States	92
28 June
Japan	63
Hungary	53

Quarter-finals
30 June
Spain	85
Argentina	47
30 June
Canada	73
Turkey	97
30 June
France	98
Serbia	59
30 June
United States	105
Japan	61

Semi-finals
1 July
Spain	83
Turkey	51
1 July
France	89
United States	86

Final
2 July
Spain (OT)	73
France	69
Third place
2 July
Turkey	84
United States	70

5–8th place bracket

5–8th place semifinals
1 July
Argentina (OT)	106
Canada	101
1 July
Serbia	99
Japan	73

Fifth place
2 July
Argentina	87
Serbia	71
Seventh place
2 July
Canada	107
Japan	58

9–16th place bracket

9–16th place quarterfinals
30 June
Lebanon	49
Brazil	72
30 June
Slovenia	85
Egypt	61
30 June
Madagascar	60
South Korea	72
30 June
China	76
Hungary	66

9–12th place semifinals
1 July
Brazil	68
Slovenia	77
1 July
South Korea	75
China	94

Ninth place
2 July
Slovenia	85
China	76
Eleventh place
2 July
Brazil	75
South Korea	68

13–16th place bracket

13–16th place semifinals
1 July
Lebanon	77
Egypt	78
1 July
Madagascar	80
Hungary	77

13th place
2 July
Egypt	104
Madagascar	64
15th place
2 July
Lebanon	73
Hungary	66

=== Round of 16 ===
28 June 2023
12:00

Boxscore

Spain	102–20	Lebanon
Scoring by quarter: 29–2, 33–4, 22–10, 18–4
Pts: De Larrea 23; Rebs: Gómez 10; Asts: Almansa 7		Pts: Rtail 8 Rebs: Assaf 5 Asts: five players 1

Oláh Gábor Utcai Sportcsarnok, Debrecen
Attendance: 95
Referees: Kristian Páez (ECU), Ahmed Al-Shuwaili (IRQ), Wissam Zein (SYR)

28 June 2023
12:30

Boxscore

Canada	90–69	Slovenia
Scoring by quarter: 23–23, 20–11, 22–13, 25–23
Pts: Fisher 18; Rebs: Fisher 11; Asts: Fisher 4		Pts: Macura 15; Rebs: Macura, Vide 7 Asts: Belko, Škorjanc 3

Főnix Hall, Debrecen
Attendance: 100
Referees: Amy Bonner (USA), Yevgeniy Mikheyev (KAZ), Daigo Urushima (JPN),

28 June 2023
14:30

Boxscore

France	119–56	Madagascar
Scoring by quarter: 31–10, 24–13, 36–5, 28–28
Pts: Parmentelot 17; Rebs: Perrin 12; Asts: Bouzidi 14		Pts: M'Madi 33; Rebs: Mirando 10; Asts: Andriatsarafara 2

Oláh Gábor Utcai Sportcsarnok, Debrecen
Attendance: 97
Referees: Gvidas Gedvilas (LTU), Blanca Burns (USA), Mohammad Taha (JOR)

28 June 2023
15:00

Boxscore

China	69–92	United States
Scoring by quarter: 9–22, 26–28, 24–19, 10–23
Pts: Wang H. 20; Rebs: Yang 10; Asts: Yang 7		Pts: Awaka 15; Rebs: Awaka 14; Asts: Armstrong 7

Főnix Hall, Debrecen
Attendance: 150
Referees: Oskars Lucis (LAT), Ariadna Chueca (ESP), Wael Mostafa (EGY)

28 June 2023
17:00

Boxscore

Brazil	85–87	Argentina
Scoring by quarter: 11–17, 22–24, 20–25, 32–21
Pts: Santos 25; Rebs: Santos 12; Asts: Da Silva Brandão 5		Pts: Aaliya 20; Rebs: Aaliya 14; Asts: Bordon 4

Oláh Gábor Utcai Sportcsarnok, Debrecen
Attendance: 110
Referees: Daniel García (VEN), Carlos Vélez (COL), Krishna Domínguez (MEX)

28 June 2023
17:30

Boxscore

Japan	63–53	Hungary
Scoring by quarter: 15–13, 20–7, 7–17, 21–16
Pts: Jacobs 15; Rebs: Kawashima 8 Asts: Okada 7		Pts: Meszlényi 14; Rebs: Schmera 8 Asts: Csátaljay, Meszlényi 3

Főnix Hall, Debrecen
Attendance: 400
Referees: Leonardo Zalazar (ARG), Rabah Noujaim (LBN), Beniamino Attard (ITA)

28 June 2023
19:30

Boxscore

Serbia	115–83	South Korea
Scoring by quarter: 33–12, 27–16, 27–32, 28–23
Pts: Borovićanin 26; Rebs: Borovićanin 11; Asts: Đoković 7		Pts: Moon 22; Rebs: Lee Y. 7 Asts: Moon, Yun 4

Oláh Gábor Utcai Sportcsarnok, Debrecen
Attendance: 83
Referees: Jenna Reneau (USA), Yener Yılmaz (TUR), Arnold Moseya (RSA)

28 June 2023
20:00

Boxscore

Egypt	53–72	Turkey
Scoring by quarter: 11–14, 8–18, 22–23, 12–17
Pts: Mohamed 14; Rebs: Mohamed 9 Asts: Mohamed 4		Pts: Cengiz 12; Rebs: Yiğitoğlu 16; Asts: Yıldızoğlu 5

Főnix Hall, Debrecen
Attendance: 150
Referees: Martin Horozov (BUL), Yu Jung (TPE), Park Kyoung-jin (KOR)

=== 9–16th place quarterfinals ===
30 June 2023
12:00

Boxscore

Lebanon	49–72	Brazil
Scoring by quarter: 12–17, 7–15, 12–10, 18–30
Pts: Rtail 12; Rebs: three players 8 Asts: Abou 4		Pts: Rodrigues 14; Rebs: Cardoso 10; Asts: Caldeira 5

Oláh Gábor Utcai Sportcsarnok, Debrecen
Attendance: 37
Referees: Martin Horozov (BUL), Park Kyoung-jin (KOR), Mohammad Taha (JOR)

30 June 2023
14:30

Boxscore

Slovenia	85–61	Egypt
Scoring by quarter: 23–13, 19–21, 23–13, 17–14
Pts: Vide 20; Rebs: Osojnik 7 Asts: Macura, Škorjanc 5		Pts: El-Shakery 12; Rebs: Zahran 9 Asts: El-Gizawy 7

Oláh Gábor Utcai Sportcsarnok, Debrecen
Attendance: 37
Referees: Oskars Lucis (LAT), Ariadna Chueca (ESP), Arnold Moseya (RSA)

30 June 2023
17:00

Boxscore

China	76–66	Hungary
Scoring by quarter: 17–9, 14–24, 24–15, 21–18
Pts: Yang 23; Rebs: Yang 10; Asts: Yang 6		Pts: Csuti 17; Rebs: Csuti 8 Asts: Meszlényi 4

Oláh Gábor Utcai Sportcsarnok, Debrecen
Attendance: 350
Referees: Daniel García (VEN), Blanca Burns (USA), Krishna Domínguez (MEX)

30 June 2023
19:30

Boxscore

Madagascar	60–72	South Korea
Scoring by quarter: 17–19, 16–16, 11–20, 16–17
Pts: Rakotonanahary 13; Rebs: Andriatsarafara 11; Asts: Rabibsoa, Rakotonanahary 6		Pts: Yun 21; Rebs: Lee Y. 8 Asts: Moon 6

Oláh Gábor Utcai Sportcsarnok, Debrecen
Attendance: 44
Referees: Yener Yılmaz (TUR), Gizella Györgyi (ROU), Glenn Cornelio (PHI)

=== Quarterfinals ===
30 June 2023
12:30

Boxscore

Spain	85–47	Argentina
Scoring by quarter: 15–8, 22–17, 26–11, 22–11
Pts: Miller 18; Rebs: Almansa 10; Asts: De Larrea 5		Pts: Bordon, Giovannetti 8 Rebs: Trouet 6 Asts: Bordon 4

Főnix Hall, Debrecen
Referees: Amy Bonner (USA), Yevgeniy Mikheyev (KAZ), Gvidas Gedvilas (LTU)

30 June 2023
15:00

Boxscore

Canada	73–97	Turkey
Scoring by quarter: 16–32, 14–26, 24–19, 19–20
Pts: Hurley 13; Rebs: Evbagharu, Rioux 5 Asts: Lee 4		Pts: Efeoglu 27; Rebs: Yiğitoğlu 13; Asts: Yildizoglu 9

Főnix Hall, Debrecen
Referees: Jenna Reneau (USA), Beniamino Attard (ITA), Péter Praksch (HUN)

30 June 2023
17:30

Boxscore

United States	105–61	Japan
Scoring by quarter: 23–21, 25–15, 29–10, 28–15
Pts: three players 15; Rebs: Awaka 10; Asts: Harper 7		Pts: Jacobs 20; Rebs: Kawashima 7 Asts: Wakugawa 5

Főnix Hall, Debrecen
Referees: Kristian Páez (ECU), Carlos Vélez (COL), Wissam Zein (SYR)

30 June 2023
20:00

Boxscore

France	98–59	Serbia
Scoring by quarter: 27–17, 29–10, 27–12, 15–20
Pts: Ajinça 23; Rebs: Perrin 9 Asts: Bouzidi, Perrin 4		Pts: Borovićanin, Đoković 13; Rebs: Borovićanin 11; Asts: Milijašević 4

Főnix Hall, Debrecen
Attendance: 400
Referees: Leonardo Zalazar (ARG), Waseem Husainy (CAN), Rabah Noujaim (LBN)

=== 13–16th place semifinals ===
1 July 2023
12:00

Boxscore

Lebanon	77–78	Egypt
Scoring by quarter: 23–20, 19–17, 19–16, 16–25
Pts: Rtail 28; Rebs: Assaf 6 Asts: Mansour 7		Pts: Mohamed 15; Rebs: Mohamed 12; Asts: El-Gizawy 7

Oláh Gábor Utcai Sportcsarnok, Debrecen
Attendance: 40
Referees: Yener Yılmaz (TUR), Gizella Györgyi (ROU), Carlos Vélez (COL)

1 July 2023
17:00

Boxscore

Madagascar	80–77	Hungary
Scoring by quarter: 25–21, 13–26, 25–10, 17–20
Pts: M'Madi 24; Rebs: Rabibisoa 15; Asts: Rabibisoa 4		Pts: Csuti 24; Rebs: Csuti 10; Asts: Csátaljay, Meszlényi 5

Oláh Gábor Utcai Sportcsarnok, Debrecen
Attendance: 175
Referees: Yu Jung (TPE), Ahmed Al-Shuwaili (IRQ), Arnold Moseya (RSA)

=== 9–12th place semifinals ===
1 July 2023
14:30

Boxscore

Brazil	68–77	Slovenia
Scoring by quarter: 16–24, 15–24, 20–10, 17–19
Pts: Cardoso 19; Rebs: Cardoso 11; Asts: Santos 5		Pts: Macura 17; Rebs: Macura 13; Asts: Belko 5

Oláh Gábor Utcai Sportcsarnok, Debrecen
Attendance: 69
Referees: Krishna Domínguez (MEX), Ariadna Chueca (ESP), Daigo Urushima (JPN)

1 July 2023
19:30

Boxscore

South Korea	75–94	China
Scoring by quarter: 17–24, 13–25, 15–16, 30–29
Pts: Moon 23; Rebs: Yun 6 Asts: Kang S. 6		Pts: Menglin 23; Rebs: Yang 15; Asts: Yang 8

Oláh Gábor Utcai Sportcsarnok, Debrecen
Attendance: 57
Referees: Beniamino Attard (ITA), Wael Mostafa (EGY), Mohammad Taha (JOR)

=== 5–8th place semifinals ===
1 July 2023
12:30

Boxscore

Argentina	106–101 (OT)	Canada
Scoring by quarter: 17–33, 26–28, 28–19, 18–9, Overtime: 17–12
Pts: Aaliya 31; Rebs: Aaliya 20; Asts: Collomb 4		Pts: Lee 21; Rebs: Pitt 9 Asts: Lee 8

Főnix Hall, Debrecen
Attendance: 150
Referees: Oskars Lucis (LAT), Blanca Burns (USA), Rabah Noujaim (LBN)

1 July 2023
15:00

Boxscore

Serbia	99–73	Japan
Scoring by quarter: 24–16, 21–28, 31–12, 23–17
Pts: Milijašević 22; Rebs: Đoković 11; Asts: Milijašević 8		Pts: Jacobs 20; Rebs: Jacobs 5 Asts: Rudolph 5

Főnix Hall, Debrecen
Attendance: 150
Referees: Amy Bonner (USA), Yevgeniy Mikheyev (KAZ), Péter Praksch (HUN)

=== Semifinals ===
1 July 2023
17:30

Boxscore

France	89–86	United States
Scoring by quarter: 23–23, 18–21, 29–22, 19–20
Pts: Perrin 18; Rebs: Perrin 9 Asts: Parmentelot, Perrin 5		Pts: Armstrong 17; Rebs: Awaka 11; Asts: O'Grady-Cook 3

Főnix Hall, Debrecen
Attendance: 1,500
Referees: Daniel García (VEN), Kristian Páez (ECU), Gvidas Gedvilas (LTU)

1 July 2023
20:00

Boxscore

Spain	83–51	Turkey
Scoring by quarter: 24–17, 25–14, 18–7, 16–13
Pts: Rodríguez 20; Rebs: Almansa, Nogués 8 Asts: Villar 5		Pts: Efeoğlu 12; Rebs: Efeoğlu, Yiğitoğlu 5 Asts: Tunca 3

Főnix Hall, Debrecen
Attendance: 1,500
Referees: Leonardo Zalazar (ARG), Martin Horozov (BUL), Waseem Husainy (CAN)

=== 15th place game ===
2 July 2023
12:30

Boxscore

Lebanon	73–66	Hungary
Scoring by quarter: 23–18, 15–15, 18–11, 17–22
Pts: Zamatta 24; Rebs: Zamatta 8 Asts: Mansour 7		Pts: Csuti, Ságodi 12; Rebs: Csuti 7 Asts: Ságodi 6

Főnix Hall, Debrecen
Attendance: 200
Referees: Yevgeniy Mikheyev (KAZ), Wael Mostafa (EGY), Park Kyoung-jin (KOR)

=== 13th place game ===
2 July 2023
10:00

Boxscore

Egypt	104–64	Madagascar
Scoring by quarter: 27–11, 32–19, 28–19, 17–15
Pts: El-Shakery 24; Rebs: Fahmi 8 Asts: El-Shakery 6		Pts: M'Madi 22; Rebs: three players 6 Asts: M'Madi 4

Oláh Gábor Utcai Sportcsarnok, Debrecen
Attendance: 45
Referees: Krishna Domínguez (MEX), Daigo Urushima (JPN), Mohammad Taha (JOR)

=== Eleventh place game ===
2 July 2023
12:30

Boxscore

Brazil	75–68	South Korea
Scoring by quarter: 14–18, 19–19, 17–12, 25–19
Pts: Santos 16; Rebs: Bersch 10; Asts: Landeira 9		Pts: Lee Y. 21; Rebs: Ku 5 Asts: Moon 8

Oláh Gábor Utcai Sportcsarnok, Debrecen
Attendance: 32
Referees: Oskars Lucis (LAT), Gizella Györgyi (ROU), Waseem Husainy (CAN)

=== Ninth place game ===
2 July 2023
15:00

Boxscore

Slovenia	85–76	China
Scoring by quarter: 23–27, 19–17, 19–20, 24–12
Pts: Zemljič 23; Rebs: Macura 12; Asts: Zemljič 7		Pts: Wang H. 16; Rebs: Yang 8 Asts: Yang 6

Oláh Gábor Utcai Sportcsarnok, Debrecen
Attendance: 95
Referees: Leonardo Zalazar (ARG), Wissam Zein (SYR), Glenn Cornelio (PHI)

=== Seventh place game ===
2 July 2023
17:30

Boxscore

Canada	107–58	Japan
Scoring by quarter: 24–18, 29–13, 29–17, 25–10
Pts: Dumont 21; Rebs: Dumont 9 Asts: Williamson 5		Pts: Jacobs, Kawashima 14; Rebs: Jacobs 8 Asts: Okada, Wakugawa 4

Oláh Gábor Utcai Sportcsarnok, Debrecen
Attendance: 21
Referees: Amy Bonner (USA), Beniamino Attard (ITA), Ariadna Chueca (ESP)

=== Fifth place game ===
2 July 2023
15:00

Boxscore

Argentina	87–71	Serbia
Scoring by quarter: 18–14, 18–27, 25–20, 26–10
Pts: Aaliya 18; Rebs: Trouet 8 Asts: Fresno, Giovannetti 3		Pts: Borovićanin 21; Rebs: Borovićanin 14; Asts: Borovićanin, Milijašević 3

Főnix Hall, Debrecen
Attendance: 400
Referees: Martin Horozov (BUL), Blanca Burns (USA), Rabah Noujaim (LBN)

=== Third place game ===
2 July 2023
17:30

Boxscore

Turkey	84–70	United States
Scoring by quarter: 25–18, 14–15, 17–13, 28–24
Pts: Yıldızoğlu 20; Rebs: Yiğitoğlu 11; Asts: Yıldızoğlu 8		Pts: Bordon 15; Rebs: Awaka 13; Asts: O'Grady-Cook 3

Főnix Hall, Debrecen
Attendance: 2,500
Referees: Kristian Páez (ECU), Péter Praksch (HUN), Carlos Vélez (COL)

=== Final ===
2 July 2023
20:00

Boxscore

Spain	73–69 (OT)	France
Scoring by quarter: 19–18, 9–11, 13–14, 22–20, Overtime: 10–6
Pts: Rodríguez 18; Rebs: Nogués 7 Asts: Villar 5		Pts: Ajinça 21; Rebs: Perrin 20; Asts: Bouzidi 6

Főnix Hall, Debrecen
Attendance: 4,000
Referees: Daniel García (VEN), Jenna Reneau (USA), Gvidas Gedvilas (LTU)

== Final standings ==
Rank	Team	Record
1st place, gold medalist(s)	Spain	7–0
2nd place, silver medalist(s)	France	5–2
3rd place, bronze medalist(s)	Turkey	6–1
4th	United States	5–2
5th	Argentina	4–3
6th	Serbia	5–2
7th	Canada	3–4
8th	Japan	2–5
9th	Slovenia	5–2
10th	China	2–5
11th	Brazil	4–3
12th	South Korea	1–6
13th	Egypt	2–5
14th	Madagascar	2–5
15th	Lebanon	1–6
16th	Hungary	2–5

== Statistics and awards ==
=== Statistical leaders ===
==== Players ====
Points

Name	PPG
(Madagascar) Mathias M'Madi	24.1
(France) Melvin Ajinça	19.3
(Slovenia) Jan Vide	17.9
(Argentina) Lee Aaliya	17.1
(Japan) Tajon Jacobs	17.0

Rebounds

Name	RPG
(France) Zacharie Perrin	10.9
(United States) Tobe Awaka	10.6
(China) Yang Hansen	10.4
(Argentina) Lee Aaliya	9.0
(Turkey) Samet Yiğitoğlu	9.0

Assists

Name	APG
(France) Alexandre Bouzidi	5.9
(Turkey) Tan Yıldızoğlu	5.3
(South Korea) Moon Yu-hyeon	4.9
(China) Yang Hansen	4.7
(Egypt) Karim El-Gizawy	4.6
(Serbia) Ilija Milijašević	4.6

Blocks

Name	BPG
(China) Yang Hansen	5.0
(Brazil) Leandro Cardoso	2.7
(United States) Asa Newell	2.3
(Argentina) Lee Aaliya	2.1
(France) Alex Sarr	2.0
(Madagascar) Lovasoa Andriatsarafara	2.0

Steals

Name	SPG
(South Korea) Moon Yu-hyeon	3.0
(Turkey) Arda Sivas	2.5
(South Korea) Lee Yu-jin	2.4
(Spain) Isaac Nogués	2.4
(Serbia) Ilija Milijašević	2.3
(Turkey) Özgür Cengiz	2.3

Efficiency

Name	EFFPG
(France) Zacharie Perrin	25.1
(China) Yang Hansen	22.9
(Spain) Izan Almansa	22.7
(Argentina) Lee Aaliya	20.6
(United States) Tobe Awaka	18.1

==== Teams ====
Points

Team	PPG
United States	98.3
France	86.7
Spain	85.3
Canada	83.3
Serbia	81.1

Rebounds

Team	RPG
United States	49.1
Canada	48.6
Brazil	47.6
Egypt	45.7
Serbia	45.7
Spain	45.7

Assists

Team	APG
France	22.7
Serbia	20.3
Turkey	20.1
Spain	19.6
Slovenia	18.6

Blocks

Team	BPG
United States	7.0
China	6.7
Brazil	6.4
Canada	6.3
Argentina	5.7

Steals

Team	SPG
South Korea	14.3
Spain	13.3
France	12.6
United States	12.3
Egypt	10.0

Efficiency

Team	EFFPG
United States	121.4
France	109.1
Spain	105.3
Turkey	91.6
Serbia	90.9

=== Awards ===
The awards were announced on 3 July 2023.

All-Tournament Team
Guards	Forwards	Center
(United States) Mark Armstrong (Spain) Jordi Rodríguez	(France) Zacharie Perrin (Turkey) Berke Büyüktuncel	(Spain) Izan Almansa
MVP: (Spain) Izan Almansa
All-Second Team
Guards	Forwards	Center
(Turkey) Tan Yıldızoğlu (France) Melvin Ajinça	(Argentina) Lee Aaliya (United States) Tobe Awaka	(China) Yang Hansen
Best defensive player: (United States) Asa Newell
Best coach: (France) Lamine Kebe
