= Serbia men's national under-18 and under-19 basketball team =

Serbia men's national under-18 and under-19 basketball team may refer to:

- Serbia men's national under-18 basketball team
- Serbia men's national under-19 basketball team
