= Melvin Ajinça =

French basketball player (born 2004)

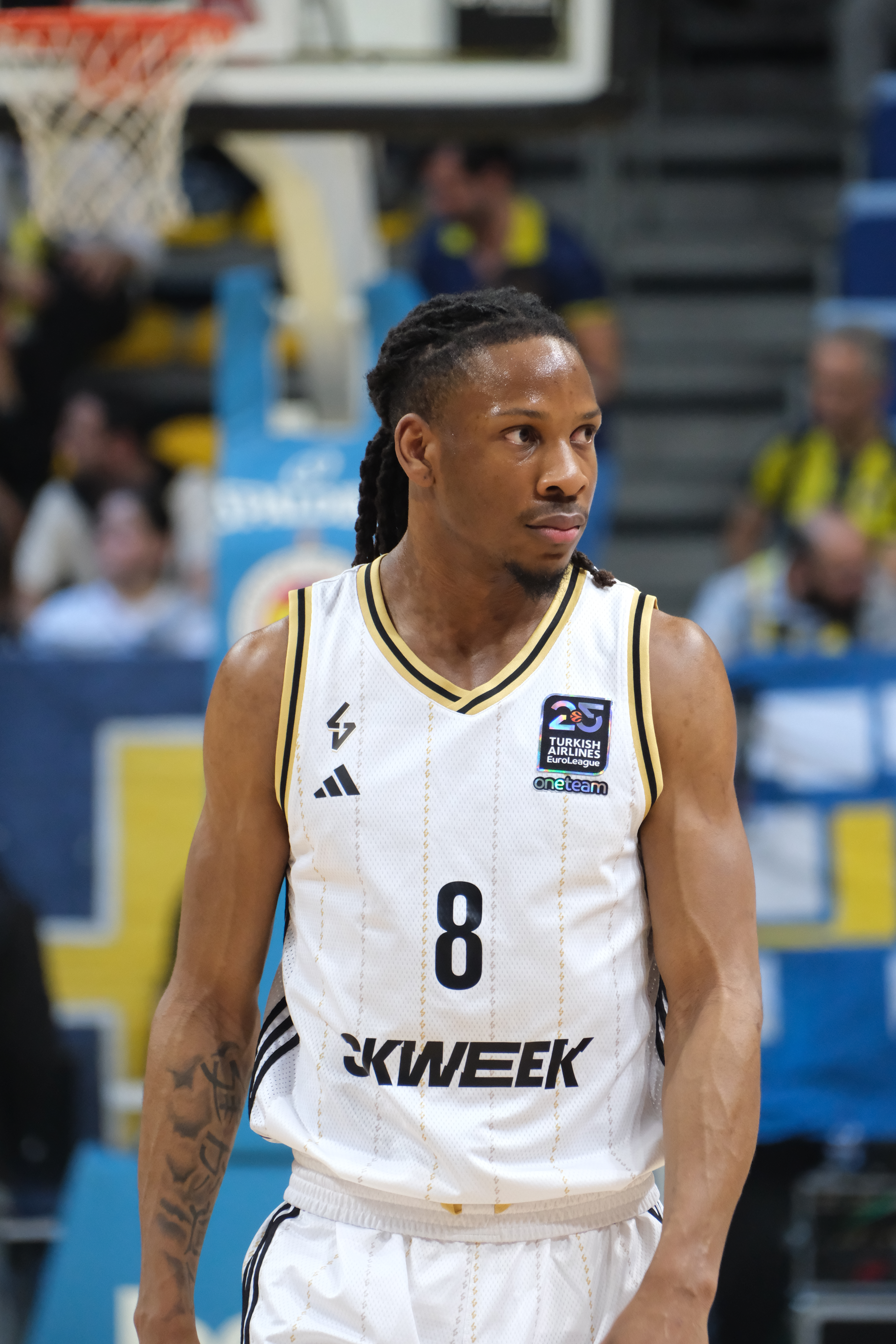
- Ajinça with LDLC ASVEL in 2025

No. 8 – Le Mans
- Position: Small forward
- League: LNB Élite; EuroCup

Personal information
- Born: 26 June 2004 (age 22) Villeneuve-Saint-Georges, France
- Listed height: 6 ft 8 in (2.03 m)
- Listed weight: 214 lb (97 kg)

Career information
- NBA draft: 2024: 2nd round, 51st overall pick
- Drafted by: New York Knicks
- Playing career: 2019–present

Career history
- 2019–2022: Centre Fédéral
- 2022–2024: Saint-Quentin
- 2024–2026: ASVEL
- 2026–present: Le Mans
- Stats at NBA.com
- Stats at Basketball Reference
Medals
Men's basketball
Representing France
FIBA U19 World Cup
Silver medal – second place	2023 Hungary	Team

Melvin Pierre Ajinça (born 26 June 2004) is a French professional basketball player for Le Mans Sarthe of the LNB Élite and the EuroCup.

== Professional career ==
=== Centre Fédéral de Basket-ball (2019–2022) ===
Born in Villeneuve-Saint-Georges, Ajinça started his playing career with Centre Fédéral de Basket-ball of the Nationale Masculine 1 in 2019.

=== Saint-Quentin Basket-Ball (2022–2024) ===
Ajinça signed with Saint-Quentin Basket-Ball of the LNB Pro B on 30 June 2022. During the 2022–23 season, he averaged 8.4 points per game and was voted the best young player in the league, as Saint-Quentin earned a promotion to the LNB Pro A.

During the 2023–24 season, he averaged 9.7 points, 3.3 rebounds and 0.7 assists across 24.5 minutes per game.

=== LDLC ASVEL (2024–2026) ===
On 23 July 2024, Ajinça signed with LDLC ASVEL of the LNB Élite.

=== Le Mans (2026–present) ===
On July 3, 2026, he signed with Le Mans of the LNB Pro A.

=== NBA rights ===
On 2 May 2024, the NBA confirmed that Ajinça was one of the international players who had declared for the 2024 NBA draft.

On 27 June, Ajinça was selected with the 51st overall pick by the New York Knicks in the 2024 NBA draft, but was later traded to the Dallas Mavericks in exchange for draft rights to the 58th pick, Ariel Hukporti. He was one of five French players selected during the entire draft, following Zaccharie Risacher (the first overall pick), Alex Sarr, Tidjane Salaün and Pacôme Dadiet. On 24 June 2026, his draft rights were traded back to New York as part of a five-team deal.

== National team career ==
Ajinça was named to the France under-19 basketball team to play in the 2023 FIBA Under-19 Basketball World Cup. He was named to the second team All-Tournament Team, after averaging 19.3 points, 2.9 rebounds, and 1.6 assists per game, as France eventually reached the final before losing to Spain.

== Personal life ==
Ajinça is a cousin of Washington Wizards assistant coach and former NBA player Alexis Ajinça.
