= Marko Simonović =

Marko Simonović may refer to:

- Marko Simonović (basketball, born 1982), Serbian assistant coach for Serbia men's national under-19 basketball team
- Marko Simonović (basketball, born 1986), Serbian basketball player (Hemofarm, Budućnost, Crvena zvezda, Zenit Saint Petersburg) and coach
- Marko Simonović (basketball, born 1999), Montenegrin basketball player (Olimpija Ljubljana, Mega Basket, Chicago Bulls)
