= Isaac Nogués =

Spanish basketball player (born 2004)

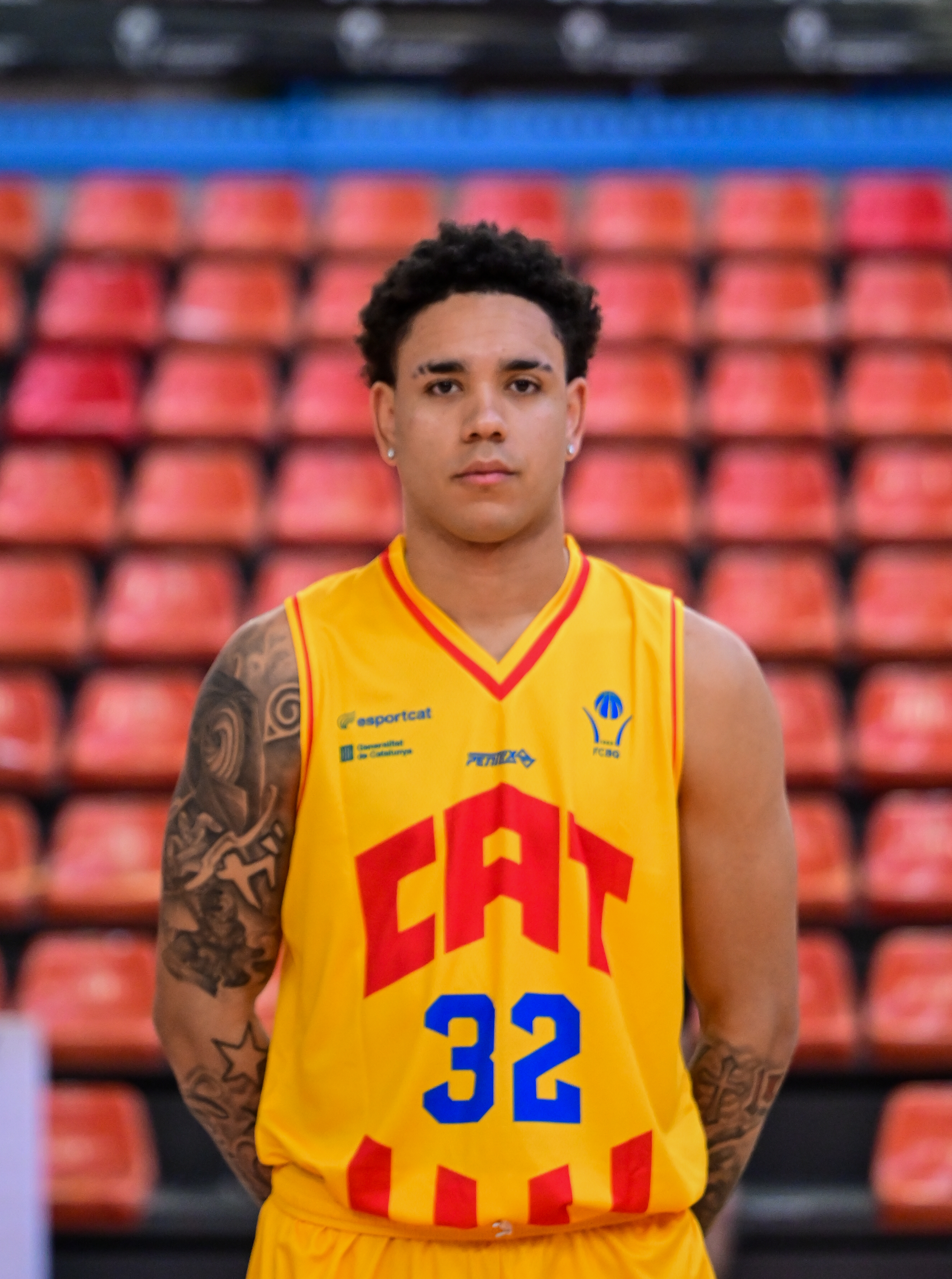
- Nogués with Catalonia in 2026

No. 32 – Joventut Badalona
- Position: Shooting guard
- League: Liga ACB

Personal information
- Born: 10 February 2004 (age 22) Badalona, Spain
- Listed height: 6 ft 5 in (1.96 m)
- Listed weight: 189 lb (86 kg)

Career information
- NBA draft: 2025: undrafted
- Playing career: 2020–present

Career history
- 2020–2024: Joventut Badalona
- 2020–2023: →Joventut Badalona B
- 2023–2024: →Peñas Huesca
- 2024–2025: Rip City Remix
- 2025–2026: Valencia
- 2026–present: Joventut Badalona

Career highlights
- Liga ACB champion (2026); 2× Spanish Supercup winner (2025, 2026); NBA G League All-Defensive Team (2025); FIBA U20 European Challenger MVP (2023)
Medals
Men's basketball
Representing Spain
FIBA U19 World Cup
Gold medal – first place	2023 Hungary	Team

Isaac Nogués González (born 10 February 2004) is a Spanish professional basketball player for Joventut Badalona of the Spanish Liga ACB. Standing 1.96 m tall, he plays as a shooting guard.

== Professional career ==
=== Joventut Badalona B and Peñas Huesca (2019–2024) ===
Nogués developed through the youth ranks of Joventut Badalona. From the 2020–21 to the 2022–23 season, he alternated between playing for the Liga EBA reserve team and the "Penya" junior team, exponentially improving his numbers in the Liga EBA each year. On 30 June 2023, Nogués was loaned to Peñas Huesca of the LEB Plata for the 2023–24 season. He posted a PIR of 15.2 per game in his first season in LEB Plata.

=== Rip City Remix (2024–2025) ===
In summer 2024, Nogués was selected fourth overall in the NBA G League international draft by the Rip City Remix, a Portland Trail Blazers affiliate. Nogués entered the 2025 NBA draft, but ultimately went undrafted.

=== Valencia Basket (2025–2026) ===
On 15 August 2025, Nogués signed with Valencia Basket on a two-year contract, marking his Euroleague debut. He had his contract with Valencia terminated on 2 July 2026 after winning the Spanish Supercup and league title with the team.

=== Joventut Badalona (2026–present) ===
On 8 July 2026, Nogués signed with Joventut Badalona of the Liga ACB on a two-season deal, returning to his hometown's club.

== National team career ==
On 2 July 2023, Nogués was part of the U-19 squad that won the U-19 World Cup held in Debrecen, Hungary. On 12 August 2025, Nogués was added to the senior squad for EuroBasket 2025, but was subsequently cut.
