= Filip Borovićanin =

Serbian basketball player (born 2004)

No. 4 – Xavier Musketeers
- Position: Small forward / power forward
- League: Big East Conference

Personal information
- Born: January 10, 2004 (age 22) Belgrade, Serbia, Serbia and Montenegro
- Listed height: 6 ft 9 in (2.06 m)
- Listed weight: 227 lb (103 kg)

Career information
- College: Arizona (2022–2024); New Mexico (2024–2025); Xavier (2025–present)

Filip Borovićanin (Serbian Cyrillic: Филип Боровићанин; born 10 January 2004) is a Serbian college basketball player for the Xavier Musketeers of the Big East Conference. He previously played for the Arizona Wildcats and the New Mexico Lobos.

== College career ==
=== Arizona ===
Borovićanin committed to play college basketball for the Arizona Wildcats. As a freshman in the 2022–23 season, he appeared in 14 games, averaging 1.3 points in limited minutes. During his sophomore season in 2023–24, he played in 20 games and averaged 2.3 points and 1.6 rebounds per game. Following the season, Borovićanin entered the NCAA transfer portal.

=== New Mexico ===
Borovićanin transferred to the New Mexico Lobos for the 2024–25 season. He earned a significantly larger role, starting 29 of 35 games and averaging 5.9 points, 4.6 rebounds, and 1.1 assists in 22.7 minutes per game.

=== Xavier ===
Ahead of the 2025–26 season, Borovićanin transferred to the Xavier Musketeers. He became a key starter for the team, starting 32 of 33 games and averaging 10.8 points, 7.4 rebounds, and 4.2 assists per game, while shooting 87.3 percent from the free-throw line.

On December 13, 2025, Borovićanin recorded a near triple-double, posting 13 points, 11 rebounds, and 8 assists in a win.

== National team career ==
He represented the Serbia national under-19 basketball team at the 2023 FIBA Under-19 Basketball World Cup. He averaged 14.1 points, 7.3 rebounds, and 2.7 assists per game.

== Career statistics ==
Legend
GP	Games played	GS	Games started	MPG	Minutes per game
FG%	Field goal percentage	3P%	3-point field goal percentage	FT%	Free throw percentage
RPG	Rebounds per game	APG	Assists per game	SPG	Steals per game
BPG	Blocks per game	PPG	Points per game	**Bold**	Career high

=== College ===
Year	Team	GP	GS	MPG	FG%	3P%	FT%	RPG	APG	SPG	BPG	PPG
2022–23	Arizona	14	0	3.9	**.538**	**.500**	.667	.9	.4	.1	—	1.3
2023–24	Arizona	20	0	5.6	.410	.000	.867	1.6	.8	.2	.1	2.3
2024–25	New Mexico	**35**	29	22.7	.413	.317	.646	4.6	1.1	.7	.2	5.9
2025–26	Xavier	33	**32**	**31.1**	.433	.349	**.873**	**7.4**	**4.2**	**1.2**	**.5**	**10.8**
Career		102	61	19.5	.428	.319	.783	4.4	2.0	.7	.3	6.1
