= 2023–24 Arizona Wildcats men's basketball team =

American college basketball season

2023–24 Arizona Wildcats men's basketball

Pac-12 regular season champions Acrisure Classic champions

NCAA tournament, Sweet Sixteen
- Conference: Pac-12 Conference

Ranking
- Coaches: No. 12
- AP: No. 11
- Record: 27–9 (15–5 Pac-12)
- Head coach: Tommy Lloyd (3rd season)
- Associate head coach: Jack Murphy (5th season)
- Assistant coaches: Riccardo Fois (3rd season); Steve Robinson (3rd season)
- Home arena: McKale Center

2023–24 Pac-12 Conference men's basketball standings
	Conf.				Overall
Team	W		L	PCT	W		L	PCT
No. 11 Arizona	15	–	5	.750	27	–	9	.750
No. 23 Washington State	14	–	6	.700	25	–	10	.714
Colorado	13	–	7	.650	26	–	11	.703
Oregon †	12	–	8	.600	24	–	12	.667
UCLA	10	–	10	.500	16	–	17	.485
Utah	9	–	11	.450	22	–	15	.595
California	9	–	11	.450	13	–	19	.406
Washington	9	–	11	.450	17	–	15	.531
USC	8	–	12	.400	15	–	18	.455
Stanford	8	–	12	.400	14	–	18	.438
Arizona State	8	–	12	.400	14	–	18	.438
Oregon State	5	–	15	.250	13	–	19	.406
† 2024 Pac-12 tournament winner Rankings from AP Poll

The 2023–24 Arizona Wildcats men's basketball team represented the University of Arizona during the 2023–24 NCAA Division I men's basketball season. The team was led by Tommy Lloyd, in his third season as head coach. It was the Wildcats' 50th season at the on-campus McKale Center in Tucson, Arizona. It was their 45th and final season as members of the Pac-12 Conference. The Arizona Wildcats men's basketball team drew an average home attendance of 14,392 in 16 games in 2023–24.

== Previous season ==
In Lloyd's second season, The Wildcats finished the 2022–23 season at 28–7, 14–6 in Pac-12 play to finish in a tie for second place. Arizona went 15–2 at home, 6–3 on the road, and 7–1 at neutral sites. The Wildcats won the school's ninth conference tournament title. Arizona received the conference's automatic bid to the NCAA tournament as the No. 2 seed in the South region. They lost to No. 15 seed Princeton in the First Round.

== Offseason ==
=== Coaching staff changes ===
The Wildcats had no coaching staff changes.

=== Departures ===
Due to COVID-19, the NCAA ruled in October 2020 that the 2020–21 season would not count against the eligibility of any basketball player, thus giving all players the option to return in 2022–23. Additionally, any players who have declared for the 2023 NBA draft—including seniors, who must opt into this year's draft—have the option to return if they make a timely withdrawal from the draft and end any pre-draft relationships with agents. Thus, separate lists will initially be maintained for confirmed and potential departures.

Arizona Wildcats Departures
Name	Number	Pos.	Height	Weight	Year	Hometown	Notes
Ben Ackerley	21	G	6’3”	170 lbs	Junior	Seattle, WA	Walk-on; transferred to Everett Community College
Adama Bal	2	G	6’6”	190 lbs	Junior	Le Mans, France	transferred to Santa Clara
Cedric Henderson Jr.	45	G/F	6’6”	200 lbs	Grad Senior	Memphis, TN	Completed college eligibility
Kerr Kriisa	25	PG	6’3”	180 lbs	Senior	Tartu, Estonia	transferred to West Virginia
Luc Krystkowiak	42	G	6’6”	195 lbs	Junior	Salt Lake City, UT	Walk-on; transferred to Cal State San Marcos
Matthew Lang	23	G	6’3”	185 lbs	Grad Senior	Portland, OR	Completed college eligibility
Jordan Mains	22	F	6’6”	200 lbs	Senior	Scottsdale, AZ	Completed college eligibility
Courtney Ramey	0	G	6’3”	185 lbs	Grad Senior	St. Louis, MO	Completed college eligibility
Ąžuolas Tubelis	10	F	6’11”	245 lbs	Senior	Vilnius, Lithuania	Declared for the 2023 NBA draft
Tautvilas Tubelis	20	F	6’7”	220 lbs	Senior	Vilnius, Lithuania	no longer on scholarship. Still with team as a manager.

=== Acquisitions ===
==== Incoming transfers ====
Arizona incoming transfers
Name	Number	Pos.	Height/Weight	Year	Hometown	Previous School	Years Remaining	Date Eligible	Source
Jaden Bradley	0	PG	6’3”, 185 lbs	Sophomore	Rochester, NY	transferred from Alabama	3	May 3, 2023	
Keshad Johnson	16	PF	6’7”, 225 lbs	Graduate	Oakland, CA	transferred from San Diego State	1	May 20, 2023	
Caleb Love	2	PG	6’4”, 200 lbs	Senior	St. Louis, MO	transferred from North Carolina	2	May 30, 2023	

=== Recruiting classes ===
==== 2023 recruiting class ====
College recruiting
Name	Hometown	School	Height	Weight	Commit date
KJ Lewis; SG	El Paso, TX	Duncanville High School	6 ft 4 in (1.93 m)	185 lb (84 kg)	Mar 9, 2022
KJ Lewis; SG	Recruit ratings: Rivals: 247Sports: ESPN: (85)				
Motiejus Krivas; C	Šiauliai, Lithuania	BC Žalgiris	7 ft 2 in (2.18 m)	253 lb (115 kg)	May 16, 2023
Motiejus Krivas; C	Recruit ratings: 247Sports:				
Paulius Murauskas; PF	Kaunas, Lithuania	BC Lietkabelis	6 ft 8 in (2.03 m)	220 lb (100 kg)	May 17, 2023
Paulius Murauskas; PF	Recruit ratings: 247Sports:				
Conrad Martínez; PG	Granollers, Spain	Joventut Badalona	6 ft 0 in (1.83 m)	175 lb (79 kg)	May 25, 2023
Conrad Martínez; PG	Recruit ratings: 247Sports:				
Overall recruit ranking:
Note: In many cases, Scout, Rivals, 247Sports, On3, and ESPN may conflict in their listings of height and weight.; In these cases, the average was taken. ESPN grades are on a 100-point scale.; Sources: "Arizona 2023 Basketball Commitments". Rivals.; "2023 Arizona Wildcats Recruiting Class". ESPN.; "2023 Team Ranking". Rivals.; "2023 Arizona 24/7 Sports Commits". 247Sports.

==== 2024 recruiting class ====
College recruiting (2024)
Name	Hometown	School	Height	Weight	Commit date
Carter Bryant; Power forward	Newport Beach, CA	Corona Centennial High School	6 ft 8 in (2.03 m)	225 lb (102 kg)	Apr 26, 2023
Carter Bryant; Power forward	Recruit ratings: Rivals: 247Sports: ESPN: (89)				
Emmanuel Stephen; Center	Lagos, Nigeria	Dream City Christian	6 ft 9 in (2.06 m)	220 lb (100 kg)	Sep 3, 2023
Emmanuel Stephen; Center	Recruit ratings: Rivals: 247Sports: ESPN: (82)				
Overall recruit ranking:
Note: In many cases, Scout, Rivals, 247Sports, On3, and ESPN may conflict in their listings of height and weight.; In these cases, the average was taken. ESPN grades are on a 100-point scale.; Sources: "Arizona 2024 Basketball Commitments". Rivals.; "2024 Arizona Wildcats Recruiting Class". ESPN.; "2024 Team Ranking". Rivals.; "2024 Arizona 24/7 Sports Commits". 247Sports.

2024 overall class rankings

Website	National rank	Conference rank	5-star recruits	4-star recruits	Total
ESPN	--	--	0	4	4
On3 Recruits	4	2	--	4	4
Rivals	4	1	0	4	4
247 Sports	2	1	--	4	4

*ESPN has not made 2024 recruiting class rankings yet.

=== Walk-ons ===
Name	Position	Height/Weight	Class	Hometown	School
Jackson Cook	Guard	6’2”, 185 lbs	Freshman	Oxford, England	Montverde (FL)
Will Kuykendall	Guard	6’3”, 175 lbs	Sophomore	Santa Maria, CA	St. Joseph (CA)

=== Red and Blue game ===
The annual Red-Blue game took place at McKale Center on Friday September 29 at 7:30 p.m. Before the game started, the team participated in the three-point shooting contest in which Filip Borovićanin defeated Caleb Love in the finals with a score of 18. After the competition of the three-point contest, Jaden Bradley, Keshad Johnson, Pelle Larsson & KJ Lewis competed in a dunk contest. Lewis defeated Johnson in the finals with a score of 39 out of a possible 40 points. Arizona women's basketball coach Adia Barnes, former Arizona Wildcat and NBA players Channing Frye, Richard Jefferson & Andre Iguodala were the judges.

The team was then split into two teams: Red and Blue, with the Blue team defeating the Red team 60−48. Oumar Ballo leading the blue team in scoring with 18 points. Keshad Johnson was the leading scorer for the red team with 13 points.

== Preseason ==
=== Preseason rankings ===
- October 11 – Pac-12 Men's Basketball Media Day in Las Vegas.

Pac-12 media poll
Predicted finish	Team	Votes (1st place)
1.	Arizona	303 (18)
2.	USC	264 (4)
3.	UCLA	249 (4)
4.	Oregon	228
5.	Colorado	210
6.	Arizona State	148
7.	Utah	139
8.	Stanford	131
9.	Washington	108
10.	Washington State	94
11.	California	67
12.	Oregon State	42

=== Preseason All-conference teams ===
Award	Player	Position	Year
Preseason All Pac-12 team (1st)	Oumar Ballo	C	(redshirt) Sr.
Preseason All Pac-12 team (2nd)	Kylan Boswell	G	So.
Preseason All Pac-12 team (2nd)	Caleb Love	G	Sr.
Preseason All Pac-12 team (Honorable Mention)	Pelle Larsson	G	Sr.

=== Award watch lists ===
Listed in the order that they were released

Award	Player	Position	Year	Source
Jerry West Award	Caleb Love	SG	Sr	
Naismith Trophy	Caleb Love	SG	Sr	
Olson Award	Caleb Love	SG	Sr	
Karl Malone Award	Keshad Johnson	PF	Sr	
Kareem Abdul-Jabbar Award	Oumar Ballo	C	(redshirt) Sr	
John R. Wooden Award	Oumar Ballo	C	(redshirt) Sr	
Naismith Trophy	Oumar Ballo	C	(redshirt) Sr	

== Personnel ==
=== Roster ===
Note: Players' year is based on remaining eligibility. The NCAA did not count the 2020–21 season towards eligibility.

2023–24 Arizona Wildcats men's basketball team
Players
Coaches

Pos.	#	Name	Height	Weight	Year	Previous school	Hometown
G	0	Jaden Bradley	6 ft 3 in (1.91 m)	200 lb (91 kg)	So	Alabama	Rochester, NY
F	1	Filip Borovićanin	6 ft 9 in (2.06 m)	225 lb (102 kg)	So	KK Beko	Belgrade, Serbia
G	2	Caleb Love	6 ft 4 in (1.93 m)	205 lb (93 kg)	Sr	North Carolina	St. Louis, MO
G	3	Pelle Larsson	6 ft 6 in (1.98 m)	215 lb (98 kg)	Sr	Utah	Nacka, Sweden
G	4	Kylan Boswell	6 ft 2 in (1.88 m)	200 lb (91 kg)	So	AZ Compass Prep	Champaign, IL
G	5	KJ Lewis	6 ft 4 in (1.93 m)	205 lb (93 kg)	Fr	Duncanville HS	El Paso, TX
C	11	Oumar Ballo	7 ft 0 in (2.13 m)	260 lb (118 kg)	RS Sr	Gonzaga	Koulikoro, Mali
G	12	Will Kuykendall (W)	6 ft 3 in (1.91 m)	175 lb (79 kg)	Fr	St Joseph HS	Santa Maria, CA
F	13	Henri Veesaar (redshirt)	7 ft 0 in (2.13 m)	225 lb (102 kg)	So	Real Madrid	Tallinn, Estonia
C	14	Motiejus Krivas	7 ft 2 in (2.18 m)	260 lb (118 kg)	Fr	Kaunas Zalgiris II	Šiauliai, Lithuania
G	15	Grant Weitman (W)	6 ft 4 in (1.93 m)	205 lb (93 kg)	Sr	Salpointe Catholic HS	Tucson, AZ
F	16	Keshad Johnson	6 ft 7 in (2.01 m)	225 lb (102 kg)	GS	San Diego State	Oakland, CA
F	23	Paulius Murauskas	6 ft 8 in (2.03 m)	225 lb (102 kg)	Fr	BC Lietkabelis	Kaunas, Lithuania
F	24	Luke Champion (W)	6 ft 8 in (2.03 m)	205 lb (93 kg)	Sr	Missouri Western State	Suwanee, GA
G	30	Jackson Cook (W)	6 ft 3 in (1.91 m)	175 lb (79 kg)	Fr	Montverde Academy (FL)	Oxford, England
F	33	Will Menaugh (W)	6 ft 10 in (2.08 m)	245 lb (111 kg)	Jr	Catalina Foothills HS	Tucson, AZ
F	44	Dylan Anderson (redshirt)	7 ft 0 in (2.13 m)	240 lb (109 kg)	So	Perry HS	Gilbert, AZ
G	55	Conrad Martinez	6 ft 0 in (1.83 m)	165 lb (75 kg)	Fr	Joventut Badalona	Granollers, Spain

Head coach

- Tommy Lloyd (Whitman)

Assistant coach(es)

- Jack Murphy (Arizona)
- Riccardo Fois (Pepperdine)
- Steve Robinson (Radford)

Legend

- (C) Team captain
- (S) Suspended
- (I) Ineligible
- (W) Walk-on
- Injured
- Current redshirt

Roster

=== Depth chart ===
Pos.	Starting 5	Bench 1	Bench 2	Bench 3
C	Oumar Ballo	Motiejus Krivas		Will Menaugh
PF	Keshad Johnson		Paulius Murauskas
SF	Pelle Larsson		Filip Borovićanin	Luke Champion
SG	Caleb Love	K.J. Lewis	Grant Weitman
PG	Kylan Boswell	Jaden Bradley	Conrad Martinez

== Schedule ==
Date time, TV	Rank^{#}	Opponent^{#}	Result	Record	High points	High rebounds	High assists	Site (attendance) city, state
Arizona Summer Tour
August 14, 2023*; 9:00 am, YouTube		Israel Select; Israel & United Arab Emirates Exhibition	W 124–77	–	24 – K. Johnson	11 – M. Krivas	6 – Tied	Hadar Yosef Arena (–); Tel Aviv, Israel
August 17, 2023*; 2:00 am, YouTube		United Arab Emirates All-Star Team; Israel & UAE Exhibition	W 127–90	–	17 – Tied	9 – O. Ballo	7 – J. Bradley	Al Jazira Club (150); Abu Dhabi, United Arab Emirates
August 19, 2023*; 6:00 am, YouTube		Lebanon; Israel & UAE Exhibition	W 85–71	–	17 – P. Larsson	7 – Tied	3 – K. Johnson	Etihad Arena (–); Abu Dhabi, United Arab Emirates
Exhibition
October 20, 2023*; 7:00 p.m., Arizona Live Stream	No. 12	Lewis–Clark	W 110–70	–	23 – C. Love	8 – F. Borvicanin	7 – C. Love	McKale Center (12,929); Tucson, AZ
October 30, 2023*; 7:00 p.m., Arizona Live Stream	No. 12	New Mexico Highlands	W 94–65	–	19 – C. Love	7 – Tied	5 – K. Lewis	McKale Center (11,439); Tucson, AZ
Non-conference regular season
November 6, 2023*; 7:30 p.m., P12N	No. 12	Morgan State	W 122–59	1–0	18 – K. Boswell	7 – Tied	4 – Tied	McKale Center (13,455); Tucson, AZ
November 10, 2023*; 5:00 p.m., ESPN2	No. 12	at No. 2 Duke	W 78–73	2–0	14 – K. Johnson	8 – Tied	5 – K. Boswell	Cameron Indoor Stadium (9,314); Durham, NC
November 13, 2023*; 6:00 p.m., P12N	No. 3	Southern; Pac-12/SWAC Legacy Series	W 97–59	3–0	17 – K. Johnson	9 – P. Murauskas	5 – Tied	McKale Center (12,868); Tucson, AZ
November 17, 2023*; 9:00 p.m., P12N	No. 3	Belmont	W 100–68	4–0	20 – Tied	9 – M. Krivas	6 – Tied	McKale Center (14,688); Tucson, AZ
November 19, 2023*; 4:00 p.m., P12N	No. 3	UT Arlington; Acrisure Classic campus game	W 101–56	5–0	15 – Tied	9 – K. Lewis	6 – C. Love	McKale Center (13,403); Tucson, AZ
November 23, 2023*; 2:00 p.m., FOX	No. 3	vs. No. 21 Michigan State; Acrisure Classic	W 74–68	6–0	17 – C. Love	10 – K. Johnson	4 – C. Love	Acrisure Arena (9,112); Thousand Palms, CA
December 2, 2023*; 1:00 p.m., P12N	No. 2	Colgate	W 82–55	7–0	15 – C. Love	10 – O. Ballo	6 – Tied	McKale Center (14,688); Tucson, AZ
December 9, 2023*; 1:15 p.m., ESPN	No. 1	No. 23 Wisconsin	W 98–73	8–0	21 – P. Larsson	9 – Tied	9 – K. Boswell	McKale Center (14,688); Tucson, AZ
December 16, 2023*; 2:30 p.m., Peacock	No. 1	vs. No. 3 Purdue; Indy Classic	L 84–92	8–1	29 – C. Love	8 – K. Johnson	6 – P. Larsson	Gainbridge Fieldhouse (17,315); Indianapolis, IN
December 20, 2023*; 9:00 p.m., ESPN	No. 4	vs. Alabama; Jerry Colangelo Hall of Fame Series	W 87–74	9–1	16 – Tied	12 – O. Ballo	3 – K. Boswell	Footprint Center (11,812); Phoenix, AZ
December 23, 2023*; 1:00 p.m., FOX	No. 4	vs. No. 14 Florida Atlantic; Desert Holiday Classic	L 95–96 ^{2OT}	9–2	26 – C. Love	19 – O. Ballo	5 – P. Larsson	T-Mobile Arena (7,207); Paradise, NV
Pac-12 regular season
December 29, 2023; 8:30 p.m., P12N	No. 4	at California	W 100–81	10–2 (1–0)	22 – C. Love	11 – O. Ballo	7 – P. Larsson	Haas Pavilion (5,947); Berkeley, CA
December 31, 2023; 2:00 p.m., P12N	No. 4	at Stanford	L 82–100	10–3 (1–1)	23 – C. Love	7 – Tied	5 – K. Boswell	Maples Pavilion (4,155); Stanford, CA
January 4, 2024; 7:30 p.m., ESPN	No. 10	Colorado	W 97–50	11–3 (2–1)	18 – P. Larsson	9 – Tied	4 – K. Boswell	McKale Center (14,286); Tucson, AZ
January 6, 2024; 6:00 p.m., P12N	No. 10	Utah	W 92–73	12–3 (3–1)	23 – C. Love	9 – O. Ballo	6 – Tied	McKale Center (14,688); Tucson, AZ
January 13, 2024; 4:00 p.m., P12N	No. 8	at Washington State	L 70–73	12–4 (3–2)	28 – C. Love	14 – O. Ballo	4 – P. Larsson	Beasley Coliseum (3,564); Pullman, WA
January 17, 2024; 8:00 p.m., ESPN	No. 12	USC	W 82–67	13–4 (4–2)	20 – C. Love	13 – Tied	5 – C. Love	McKale Center (14,688); Tucson, AZ
January 20, 2024; 2:00 p.m., ESPN2	No. 12	UCLA; Rivalry	W 77–71	14–4 (5–2)	22 – P. Larsson	13 – O. Ballo	4 – P. Larrson	McKale Center (14,688); Tucson, AZ
January 25, 2024; 9:00 p.m., P12N	No. 9	at Oregon State	L 80–83	14–5 (5–3)	23 – C. Love	6 – Tied	4 – P. Larsson	Gill Coliseum (4,239); Corvallis, OR
January 27, 2024; 3:30 p.m., FOX	No. 9	at Oregon	W 87–78	15–5 (6–3)	36 – C. Love	9 – O. Ballo	4 – P. Larsson	Matthew Knight Arena (12,364); Eugene, OR
February 1, 2024; 6:30 p.m., P12N	No. 11	California	W 91–65	16–5 (7–3)	22 – O. Ballo	13 – O. Ballo	5 – K. Boswell	McKale Center (14,688); Tucson, AZ
February 4, 2024; 6:00 p.m., FS1	No. 11	Stanford	W 82–71	17–5 (8–3)	18 – Tied	13 – O. Ballo	7 – C. Love	McKale Center (14,688); Tucson, AZ
February 8, 2024; 6:00 p.m., P12N	No. 8	at Utah	W 105–99 ^{3OT}	18–5 (9–3)	27 – P. Larsson	16 – O. Ballo	8 – P. Larsson	Jon M. Huntsman Center (10,944); Salt Lake City, UT
February 10, 2024; 8:00 p.m., ESPN	No. 8	at Colorado	W 99–79	19–5 (10–3)	19 – C. Love	13 – O. Ballo	4 – K. Boswell	CU Events Center (10,548); Boulder, CO
February 17, 2024; 7:30 p.m., FS1	No. 5	Arizona State; Rivalry	W 105–60	20–5 (11–3)	21 – J. Bradley	11 – O. Ballo	5 – J. Bradley	McKale Center (14,688); Tucson, AZ
February 22, 2024; 9:00 p.m., FS1	No. 4	No. 21 Washington State	L 74–77	20–6 (11–4)	27 – C. Love	11 – O. Ballo	5 – C. Love	McKale Center (14,688); Tucson, AZ
February 24, 2024; 12:00 p.m., CBS	No. 4	Washington	W 91–75	21–6 (12–4)	30 – C. Love	14 – O. Ballo	4 – P. Larsson	McKale Center (14,688); Tucson, AZ
February 28, 2024; 8:00 p.m., P12N	No. 6	at Arizona State; Rivalry	W 85–67	22–6 (13–4)	17 – K. Boswell	13 – O. Ballo	5 – Tied	Desert Financial Arena (14,129); Tempe, AZ
March 2, 2024; 12:00 p.m., ESPN	No. 6	Oregon; Senior Night	W 103–83	23–6 (14–4)	22 – Tied	13 – O. Ballo	7 – C. Love	McKale Center (14,688); Tucson, AZ
March 7, 2024; 7:30 p.m., ESPN	No. 5	at UCLA; Rivalry	W 88–65	24–6 (15–4)	18 – K. Lewis	11 – K. Johnson	5 – K. Boswell	Pauley Pavilion (8,428); Los Angeles, CA
March 9, 2024; 8:00 p.m., ESPN	No. 5	at USC	L 65–78	24–7 (15–5)	17 – Tied	10 – O. Ballo	5 – K. Johnson	Galen Center (8,976); Los Angeles, CA
Pac-12 Tournament
March 14, 2024; 12:00 p.m., P12N	(1) No. 6	vs. (9) USC; Quarterfinals	W 70–49	25–7	15 – KJ Lewis	13 – O. Ballo	3 – Tied	T-Mobile Arena (14,076); Paradise, NV
March 15, 2024; 5:00 p.m., P12N	(1) No. 6	vs. (4) Oregon; Semifinals	L 59–67	25–8	14 – O. Ballo	12 – O. Ballo	3 – Tied	T-Mobile Arena (17,502); Paradise, NV
NCAA tournament
March 21, 2024*; 11:00 a.m., TBS	(2 W) No. 9	vs. (15 W) Long Beach State; First Round	W 85–65	26–8	20 – K. Boswell	13 – O. Ballo	8 – K. Boswell	Delta Center (17,102); Salt Lake City, UT
March 23, 2024*; 9:45 a.m., CBS	(2 W) No. 9	vs. (7 W) Dayton; Second Round	W 78–68	27–8	19 – C. Love	7 – Tied	7 – P. Larsson	Delta Center (17,414); Salt Lake City, UT
March 28, 2024*; 4:09 p.m., CBS	(2 W) No. 9	vs. (6 W) Clemson; Sweet Sixteen	L 72–77	27–9	18 – Bradley	15 – Ballo	4 – Larsson	Crypto.com Arena (19,625); Los Angeles, CA
*Non-conference game. ^{#}Rankings from AP Poll. (#) Tournament seedings in parentheses. W=West. All times are in Mountain Time.

== Game summaries ==
This section will be filled in as the season progresses.

=== vs Israel Select (Arizona Summer Tour) ===
YouTube

Aug. 14, 2023
9:00 a.m.

Israel Select 77, Arizona Wildcats 124
Scoring by half: 35–52, 42–72
Pts: Ryan Turell, 30; Rebs: Tomer Levinson, 5 Asts: Alon Drucker, 5	Pts: Keshad Johnson, 24; Rebs: Motiejus Krivas, 11; Asts: 3 tied, 6

Hadar Yosef Arena, Tel Aviv, Israel
Attendance: –
Referees: –

=== United Arab Emirates All-Star Team (Arizona Summer Tour) ===
YouTube

August 17, 2023
2:00 am

Box Score

UAE All-Star Team 90, Arizona Wildcats 127
Scoring by half: 37–60, 53–67
Pts: DeQuan Jones, 30; Rebs: Tied, 6 Asts: Humaid Alkharoosi, 7	Pts: Tied, 17; Rebs: Oumar Ballo, 9 Asts: Jaden Bradley, 7

Al Jazira Club, Abu Dhabi, United Arab Emirates
Attendance: 150

=== Lebanon (Arizona Summer Tour) ===
YouTube

August 19, 2023
6:00 a.m.

Lebanon 71, Arizona Wildcats 85
Scoring by half: 28–42, 43–43
Pts: Omar Spellman, 21; Rebs: Sergio Darwich, 10; Asts: Tied, 5	Pts: Pelle Larrson, 17; Rebs: Tied, 7 Asts: Keshad Johnson, 3

Etihad Arena, Abu Dhabi, UAE

=== Lewis–Clark(exhibition) ===
Arizona Live Stream

October 20, 2023
7:00 p.m.

Box Score

Lewis–Clark Warriors 70, No. 12 Arizona Wildcats 110
Scoring by half: 36–57, 34–53
Pts: Macahry Morris, 11; Rebs: Macahry Morris, 5 Asts: tied , 2	Pts: Caleb Love, 23; Rebs: Filip Borvicanin, 8 Asts: Caleb Love, 7

McKale Center, Tucson, AZ
Attendance: 12,929
Referees: Glen Mayberry, Jason Garretson, Marcus Hicks

=== New Mexico Highlands (exhibition) ===
Arizona Live Stream

October 30, 2023
7:00 p.m.

Box Score

New Mexico Highlands Cowboys 65, No. 12 Arizona Wildcats 94
Scoring by half: 26–47, 39–47
Pts: tied, 10; Rebs: K. Robinson, 4 Asts: tied, 2	Pts: Caleb Love, 19; Rebs: tied, 7 Asts: KJ Lewis, 5

McKale Center, Tucson, AZ
Attendance: 11,439
Referees: Tony Padilla, Bert Smith, Scott Brown

=== Morgan State ===
P12N

November 6, 2023
7:30 p.m.

Box Score

Morgan State Bears 59, No. 12 Arizona Wildcats 122
Scoring by half: 26–61, 33–61
Pts: Christian Oliver, 12; Rebs: tied, 4 Asts: tied, 2	Pts: Kylan Boswell, 18; Rebs: tied, 7 Asts: tied, 4

McKale Center, Tucson, AZ
Attendance: 13,455
Referees: Randy McCall, Glen Mayberry, Jason Garretson

=== at Duke ===
ESPN2

November 10, 2023
5:00 p.m.

Box Score

No. 12 Arizona Wildcats 78, No. 2 Duke Blue Devils 73
Scoring by half: 41–33, 37–40
Pts: Keshad Johnson, 14; Rebs: tied, 8 Asts: Kylan Boswell, 5	Pts: Kyle Filipowski, 25; Rebs: Kyle Filipowski, 8 Asts: tied, 5

Cameron Indoor Stadium, Durham, NC
Attendance: 9,314
Referees: Doug Sirmons, Brian O’Connell, Ron Groover

=== Southern ===
P12N

November 13, 2023
6:00 p.m.

Box Score

Southern Jaguars 59, No. 3 Arizona Wildcats 97
Scoring by half: 23–35, 36–62
Pts: Tai’Reon, 22; Rebs: tied, 3 Asts: Tai’Reon, 5	Pts: Keshad Johnson, 17; Rebs: Paulius Murauskas, 9 Asts: Tied, 5

McKale Center, Tucson, AZ
Attendance: 12,868
Referees: Kipp Kissinger, Brooks Wells, Verne Harris

=== Belmont ===
P12N

November 17, 2023
9:00 p.m.

Box Score

Belmont Bruins 68, No. 3 Arizona Wildcats 100
Scoring by half: 35–55, 33–44
Pts: Malik Dia, 21; Rebs: Malik Dia, 7 Asts: Keishawn Davidson, 7	Pts: Tied, 20; Rebs: Motiejus Krivas, 9 Asts: Tied, 6

McKale Center, Tucson, AZ
Attendance: 14,688
Referees: Deldre Carr, Kelly Pfeifer, Tommy Johnson

=== UT-Arlington ===
P12N

November 19, 2023
4:00 p.m.

Box Score

UT Arlington Mavericks 56, No. 3 Arizona Wildcats 101
Scoring by half: 36–43, 19–58
Pts: Shemar Wilson, 19; Rebs: tied, 4 Asts: DaJuan Gordon, 4	Pts: tied, 15; Rebs: K.J. Lewis, 9 Asts: Caleb Love, 9

McKale Center, Tucson, AZ
Attendance: 13,403
Referees: Darren White, Randy Richardson, Greg Nixon

=== vs Michigan State ===
FOX

November 23, 2023
2:00 p.m.

Box Score

No. 3 Arizona Wildcats 74, No. 21 Michigan State Spartans 68
Scoring by half: 40–30, 34–38
Pts: Tyson Walker, 18; Rebs: Mady Sissoko, 10; Asts: Tyson Walker, 4	Pts: Caleb Love, 17; Rebs: Keshad Johnson, 10; Asts: Caleb Love, 4

Acrisure Arena, Thousand Palms, CA
Attendance: 9,112
Referees: Kipp Kissinger, Michael Irving, Eric Curry

=== Colgate ===
P12N

December 2, 2023
1:00 p.m.

Box Score

Colgate Raiders 55, No. 2 Arizona Wildcats 82
Scoring by half: 30–35, 25–48
Pts: Braeden Smith, 11; Rebs: Jeff Woodward, 5 Asts: Braeden Smith, 4	Pts: Caleb Love, 14; Rebs: Oumar Ballo, 10; Asts: tied,6

McKale Center, Tucson, AZ
Attendance: 14,688
Referees: James Schipper, Randy Heimerman, Michael Schyphers

=== Wisconsin ===
ESPN

December 9, 2023
1:15 p.m.

Box Score

No. 23 Wisconsin Badgers 73, No. 1 Arizona Wildcats 98
Scoring by half: 31–48, 42–50
Pts: John Blackwell, 17; Rebs: John Blackwell, 7 Asts: Chucky Hepburn, 6	Pts: Pelle Larsson, 21; Rebs: tied, 9 Asts: Kylan Boswell, 9

McKale Center, Tucson, AZ
Attendance: 14,688
Referees: Kipp Kissinger, Brooks Wells, Eric Curry

=== Purdue ===
Peacock

December 16, 2023
2:30 p.m.

Box Score

No. 3 Purdue Boilermakers 92, No. 1 Arizona Wildcats 84
Scoring by half: 49–38, 43–46
Pts: Fletcher Loyer, 27; Rebs: Zach Edey, 9 Asts: Zach Edey, 5	Pts: Caleb Love, 29; Rebs: Kesha’s Johnson, 8 Asts: Pelle Larsson, 6

Gainbridge Fieldhouse, Indianapolis, IN
Attendance: 17,315
Referees: Jeff Anderson, Tim Comer, Tony Padilla

=== vs Alabama ===
ESPN

December 20th, 2023
9:00 p.m.

Box Score

Alabama Crimson Tide 74, No. 4 Arizona Wildcats 87
Scoring by half: 40–41, 34–46
Pts: Grant Nelson, 17; Rebs: Mohamed Wague, 7 Asts: Aaron Estrada, 6	Pts: tied, 16; Rebs: Oumar Ballo, 12; Asts: Kylan Boswell, 3

Footprint Center, Phoenix, AZ
Attendance: 11,812
Referees: Rob Rorke, Mike Reed, Jeb Hartness

=== vs Florida Atlantic ===
FOX

December 23rd, 2023
1:00 p.m.

Box Score

No. 14 Florida Atlantic Owls 96, No. 4 Arizona Wildcats 95 (2OT)
Scoring by half: 31–37, 42–36 Overtime: 11–11, 12–11
Pts: Johnell Davis, 35; Rebs: Johnell Davis, 9 Asts: Jalen Gaffney, 4	Pts: Caleb Love, 26; Rebs: Oumar Ballo, 21; Asts: Pelle Larsson, 5

T-Mobile Arena, Las Vegas, NV
Attendance: 7,207
Referees: Byron Jarrett, Pat Adams, Randy McCall

=== at California ===
P12N

December 29, 2023
8:30 p.m.

Box Score

California Golden Bears 81, No. 4 Arizona Wildcats 100
Scoring by half: 26–54, 55–46
Pts: Jaylon Tyson, 22; Rebs: Jaylon Tyson, 10; Asts: Devin Askew, 5	Pts: Caleb Love, 22; Rebs: Oumar Ballo, 11; Asts: Pelle Larsson, 7

Haas Pavilion, Berkeley, CA
Attendance: 5,947
Referees: Michael Greenstein, Keith Kimble, James Schipper

=== at Stanford ===
P12N

December 31, 2023
2:00 p.m.

No. 4 Arizona Wildcats 82, Stanford Cardinal 100
Scoring by half: 35–44, 48–55
Pts: Caleb Love, 23; Rebs: Tied, 7 Asts: Kylan Boswell, 5	Pts: Kanaan Carlyle, 28; Rebs: Kanaan Carlyle, 8 Asts: Jared Bynum, 11

Maples Pavilion, Stanford, CA
Attendance: 4,155
Referees: Verne Harris, Deron White, Randy Richardson

=== Colorado ===
ESPN

January 4, 2024
7:30 p.m.

Box Score

Colorado Buffaloes 50, No. 10 Arizona Wildcats 97
Scoring by half: 23–50, 27–47
Pts: Javon Ruffin, 11; Rebs: KJ Simpson, 7 Asts: Tied, 3	Pts: Pelle Larsson, 18; Rebs: Tied, 9 Asts: Kylan Boswell, 4

McKale Center, Tucson, AZ
Attendance: 14,286
Referees: Tony Padilla, Greg Nixon, DJ Carstensen

=== Utah ===
P12N

January 6, 2024
6:00 p.m.

Box Score

Utah Utes 73, No. 10 Arizona Wildcats 92
Scoring by half: 39–42, 34–50
Pts: Gabe Madsen, 18; Rebs: Ben Carlson, 6 Asts: Rollie Worster, 5	Pts: Caleb Love, 23; Rebs: Oumar Ballo, 9 Asts: Tied, 6

McKale Center, Tucson, AZ
Attendance: 14,688
Referees: Michael Irving, Deldre Carr, Tommy Johnson

=== at Washington State ===
P12N

January 13, 2024
4:00 p.m.

Box Score

No. 8 Arizona Wildcats 70, Washington State Cougars 73
Scoring by half: 30–34, 40–39
Pts: Caleb Love, 26; Rebs: Oumar Ballo, 14; Asts: Pelle Larsson, 4	Pts: Isaac Jones, 24; Rebs: Isaac Jones, 13; Asts: Myles Rice, 5

Beasley Coliseum, Pullman, WA
Attendance: 3,564
Referees: Tony Padilla, Deron White, Kelly Pfeifer

=== USC ===
ESPN

January 17, 2024
8:00 p.m.

Box Score

USC Trojans 67, No. 12 Arizona Wildcats 82
Scoring by half: 35–45, 32–37
Pts: DJ Rodman, 16; Rebs: Tied, 7 Asts: Bronny James, 6	Pts: Caleb Love, 20; Rebs: Tied, 13; Asts: Caleb Love, 5

McKale Center, Tucson, AZ
Attendance: 14,688
Referees: Mike Reed, Verne Harris, Randy Richardson

=== UCLA (Rivalry) ===
ESPN2

January 20, 2024
2:00 p.m.

Box Score

UCLA Bruins 71, No. 12 Arizona Wildcats 77
Scoring by half: 37–28, 34–49
Pts: Sebastian Mack, 21; Rebs: Lazar Stefanovic, 8 Asts: Sebastian Mack, 4	Pts: Pelle Larson, 21; Rebs: Oumar Ballo, 13; Asts: Pelle Larsson, 4

McKale Center, Tucson, AZ
Attendance: 14,688
Referees: Kelly Pfeiffer, Nate Harris, Ray Natioli

=== at Oregon State ===
P12N

January 25, 2024
9:00 p.m.

Box Score

No. 9 Arizona Wildcats 80, Oregon State Beavers 83
Scoring by half: 44–36, 36–47
Pts: Caleb Love, 23; Rebs: Tied, 6 Asts: Pelle Larsson, 4	Pts: Jordan Pope, 31; Rebs: Tied, 7 Asts: Jordan Pope, 5

Gill Coliseum, Corvallis, OR
Attendance: 4,239
Referees: Michael Greenstein, Tony Padilla, Earl Walton

=== at Oregon ===
FOX

January 27, 2024
3:30 p.m.

Box Score

No. 9 Arizona Wildcats 87, Oregon Ducks 78
Scoring by half: 45–38, 42–40
Pts: Caleb Love, 36; Rebs: Oumar Ballo, 9 Asts: Pelle Larsson, 4	Pts: Jermaine Couisnard, 20; Rebs: Tied, 5 Asts: Jermaine Couisnard, 5

Matthew Knight Arena, Eugene, OR
Attendance: 12,364
Referees: Randy McCall, Gregory Nixon, Scott Brown

=== California ===
P12N

February 1, 2024
6:30 p.m.

Box Score

California Golden Bears 65, No. 11 Arizona Wildcats 91
Scoring by half: 28–48, 37–43
Pts: Jalen Celestine; Rebs: Jaylon Tyson, 10; Asts: Jaylon Tyson, 4	Pts: Oumar Ballo, 22; Rebs: Oumar Ballo, 13; Asts: Kylan Boswell, 5

McKale Center, Tucson, AZ
Attendance: 14,688
Referees: Michael Irving, Michael Reed, Deldre Carr

=== Stanford ===
FS1

February 4, 2024
6:00 p.m.

Box Score

Stanford Cardinal 71, No. 11 Arizona Wildcats 82
Scoring by half: 45–34, 36–47
Pts: Maxime Raynaud, 29; Rebs: Brandon Angel, 7 Asts: Benny Gealer, 9	Pts: Tied, 18; Rebs: Oumar Ballo, 13; Asts: Caleb Love, 7

McKale Center, Tucson, AZ
Attendance: 14,688
Referees: Kipp Kissinger, Tony Padilla, Roger Ayers

=== at Utah ===
P12N

February 8, 2024
6:00 p.m.

Box Score

No. 8 Arizona Wildcats 105, Utah Utes 99 (3OT)
Scoring by half: 41–25, 35–51 Overtime: 6–6, 9–9, 14–8
Pts: Branden Carlson, 27; Rebs: Branden Carlson, 15; Asts: Deivon Smith, 10	Pts: Pelle Larsson, 27; Rebs: Oumar Ballo, 15; Asts: Pelle Larson, 8

Jon M. Huntsman Center, Salt Lake City, UT
Attendance: 10,944
Referees: Roger Ayers, Mike Littlewood, Bert Smith

=== at Colorado ===
ESPN

February 10, 2024
8:00 p.m.

Box Score

No. 8 Arizona Wildcats 99, Colorado Buffaloes 79
Scoring by half: 47–40, 52–39
Pts: Caleb Love, 19; Rebs: Oumar Ballo, 13; Asts: K. Boswell, 4	Pts: Tied, 20; Rebs: J’Vonne Hadley, 6 Asts: K.J. Simpson, 9

CU Events Center, Boulder, CO
Attendance: 10,548
Referees: Michael Irving, Randy Richardson, Ryan Holmes

=== Arizona State ===
FS1

February 17, 2024
7:30 p.m.

Box Score

Arizona State Sun Devils 60, No. 5 Arizona Wildcats 105
Scoring by half: 31–49, 29–56
Pts: Adam Miller, 16; Rebs: Jamiya Neal, 6 Asts: Tied, 2	Pts: Jaden Bradley, 21; Rebs: Oumar Ballo, 11; Asts: Jaden Bradley, 5

McKale Center, Tucson, AZ
Attendance: 14,688
Referees: Ray Natili, Bill Vinovich, Dave Hall

=== Washington State ===
FS1

February 22, 2024
9:00 p.m.

Box Score

No. 21 Washington State Cougars 77, No. 4 Arizona Wildcats 74
Scoring by half: 34–33, 43–41
Pts: Jaylen Wells, 27; Rebs: Rueben Chinyelu, 11; Asts: Andrej Jakimovski, 4	Pts: Caleb Love, 27; Rebs: Oumar Ballo, 11; Asts: Caleb Love, 5

McKale Center, Tucson, AZ
Attendance: 14,688
Referees: Verne Harris, Paul Scelz, D.J. Carstensen

=== Washington ===
CBS

February 24, 2024
12:00 p.m.

Box Score

Washington Huskies 75, No.4 Arizona Wildcats 91
Scoring by half: 35–52, 40–39
Pts: Koren Johnson, 17; Rebs: Tied, 6 Asts: Sahvir Wheeler, 6	Pts: Caleb Love, 30; Rebs: Oumar Ballo, 14; Asts: Pelle Larsson, 7

McKale Center, Tucson, AZ
Attendance: 14,688
Referees: DG Nelson, Deron White, Jason Garretson

=== at Arizona State ===
P12N

February 28, 2024
8:00 p.m.

Box Score

No. 6 Arizona Wildcats 85, Arizona State Sun Devils 67
Scoring by half: 41–27, 44–40
Pts: Kylan Boswell, 17; Rebs: Oumar Ballo, 13; Asts: Tied, 5	Pts: Adam Miller, 16; Rebs: Tied, 5 Asts: Frankie Collins, 3

Desert Financial Arena, Tempe, AZ
Attendance: 14,129
Referees: Kipp Kissinger, Michael Reed, Deldre Carr

=== Oregon ===
ESPN

March 2, 2024
12:00 p.m.

Box Score

Oregon Ducks 83, No. 6 Arizona Wildcats 103
Scoring by half: 30–51, 53–52
Pts: Jermaine Cousinard, 39; Rebs: N’Faly Dante, 10; Asts: Jermaine Cousinard, 5	Pts: Tied, 22; Rebs: Oumar Ballo, 12; Asts: C. Love, 7

McKale Center, Tucson, AZ
Attendance: 14,688
Referees: Brooks Wells, Randy McCall, Mike Littlewood

=== at UCLA (Rivalry) ===
ESPN

March 7, 2024
7:30 p.m.

Box Score

No. 5 Arizona Wildcats 88, UCLA Bruins 65
Scoring by half: 44–27, 44–28
Pts: K.J. Lewis, 18; Rebs: Keshad Johnson, 11; Asts: Kylan Boswell, 5	Pts: Lazar Stefanovic, 20; Rebs: Adem Bona, 5 Asts: Sebastian Mack, 3

Pauley Pavilion, Los Angeles, CA
Referees: Tony Padilla, Jeffrey Anderson, Roger Ayers

=== at USC ===
ESPN

March 9, 2024
8:00 p.m.

Box Score

No. 5 Arizona Wildcats 65, USC Trojans 78
Scoring by half: 30–34, 35–41
Pts: Tied, 17; Rebs: Oumar Ballo, 10; Asts: Keshad Johnson, 5	Pts: Tied, 19; Rebs: D.J. Rodman, 7 Asts: Isaiah Collier, 5

Galen Center, Los Angeles, CA
Referees: Michael Reed, Eric Curry, Layne Barney

=== USC (Pac-12 Quarterfinal) ===
P12N

March 14, 2024
12:00 p.m.

Box Score

No. 9 USC Trojans 49, No. 1 Arizona Wildcats 70
Scoring by half: 16−28, 33−42
Pts: Kobe Johnson, 14; Rebs: Kobe Johnson, 8 Asts: Isaiah Collier, 3	Pts: KJ Lewis, 15; Rebs: Oumar Ballo, 13; Asts: Tied, 3

T-Mobile Arena, Las Vegas, NV
Attendance: 14,076
Referees: Mike Littlewood, Deldre Carr, Jason Garretson

=== Oregon(Pac-12 Semifinal) ===
Pac-12 Network

March 15
6:00 p.m.

Box Score

No. 4 Oregon 67, No. 1 Arizona 59
Scoring by half: 23−33, 44−26
Pts: Jackson Shelstad, 21; Rebs: N’Faly Dante, 10; Asts: Jermaine Couisnard, 7	Pts: Oumar Ballo, 14; Rebs: Oumar Ballo, 12; Asts: Tied, 3

T-Mobile Arena
Paradise, NV
Attendance: 17,502
Referees: Tony Padilla, Brooks Wells, Deldre Carr

=== Long Beach State (round of 64) ===
TBS

March 21, 2024
11:00 a.m.

Box Score

No. 15 Long Beach State 65, No. 2 Arizona 85
Scoring by half: 35−41, 30−45
Pts: Tied, 14; Rebs: Aboubacar Traore, 15; Asts: Aboubacar Traore, 4	Pts: Kylan Boswell, 20; Rebs: Oumar Ballo, 13; Asts: Kylan Boswell, 8

Delta Center
Salt Lake City, UT
Attendance: 17,102
Referees: Keith Kimble, Nathan Farrell, John Floyd

=== Dayton (round of 32) ===
CBS

March 23, 2024
9:45 a.m.

Box Score

No. 7 Dayton 68, No. 2 Arizona 78
Scoring by half: 33−40, 35−38
Pts: DaRon Holmes III, 23; Rebs: DaRon Holmes III, 11; Asts: DaRon Holmes III, 3	Pts: Caleb Love, 19; Rebs: Tied, 7 Asts: Pelle Larsson, 6

Delta Center
Salt Lake City, UT
Attendance: 17,414
Referees: Tony Padilla, Brian O'Connell, Brooks Wells

=== Clemson (Sweet Sixteen) ===
CBS

March 28, 2024
4:09 p.m.

Box Score

No. 6 Clemson 77, No. 2 Arizona 72
Scoring by half: 39−31, 38−41
Pts: Chase Hunter, 18; Rebs: P.J. Hall, 8 Asts: Joseph Girard, 6	Pts: Jaden Bradley, 18; Rebs: Oumar Ballo, 15; Asts: Pelle Larsson, 4

Crypto.com Arena
Los Angeles, CA
Attendance: 19,625
Referees: Bert Smith, Brent Hampton, Jeb Hartness

== Awards and honors ==
Weekly honors
Recipient (Position)	Award (Pac-12 Conference)	Stats (PPG/RPG/APG)	Week	Date Awarded	Ref.
Kylan Boswell	Pac-12 Player of the Week	15.0 Points, 6.5 Rebounds, 3.0 Assists	Week 1	November 13, 2023	
Oumar Ballo	Pac-12 Player of the Week	14.5 Points, 16.5 Rebounds, 1.5 Assists, 1.5 Steals, 1.0 Block	Week 7	December 26, 2023	
Caleb Love	Pac-12 Player of the Week	19.5 Points, 4.5 Rebounds, 3.5 Assists	Week 9	January 8, 2024	
Pelle Larsson	Pac-12 Player of the Week	22.5 Points, 5.5 Rebounds, 5.0 Assists, 2.5 Steals	Week 14	February 12, 2024	

=== Midseason awards watchlists ===
Midseason award honors
Honors	Player	Position	Ref.
John R. Wooden Award	Caleb Love	PG	
Lute Olson Award	Caleb Love	PG	
Jerry West Award	Caleb Love	PG	
Karl Malone Award	Keshad Johnson	PF	

=== Final awards watchlists ===
Final award honors
Honors	Player	Position	Ref.
Jerry West Award	Caleb Love	PG	
John R. Wooden Award	Caleb Love	PG	

=== Postseason ===
Conference honors
Recipient (Position)	Award (Pac-12 Conference)	Stats (PPG/RPG/APG)	Ref.
Caleb Love	Pac-12 Player of the Year & Pac-12 First Team	18.7 PPG, 4.9 RPG, 3.4 APG, 1.2 SPG	
Caleb Love	Pac-12 First Team	18.7 PPG, 4.9 RPG, 3.4 APG, 1.2 SPG	
Oumar Ballo	Pac-12 First Team	13.1 PPG, 10.0 RPG, 1.0 SPG	
Pelle Larsson	Pac-12 Second Team	13.0 PPG, 4.1 RPG, 3.7 APG, 1.0 SPG	

==== National awards ====
National award honors
Honors	Player	Position	Ref.
NABC &USBWA 2nd Team All-American	Caleb Love	G	
Associated Press & Sporting News 3rd Team All-American	Caleb Love	G	

== Rankings ==
Ranking movements Legend: ██ Increase in ranking ██ Decrease in ranking ( ) = First-place votes
	Week																				
Poll	Pre	1	2	3	4	5	6	7	8	9	10	11	12	13	14	15	16	17	18	19	Final
AP	12	3 (3)	3 (3)	2 (1)	1 (59)	1 (62)	4	4	10	8	12	9	11	8	5	4	6	5	6	9	11
Coaches	11	3 (3)	3 (2)	2	1 (26)	1 (28)	4	4	10	8	13	9	12	8	6	4	7	5	7	9	12

== See also ==
2023–24 Arizona Wildcats women's basketball team
