= Lazar Grbović =

Serbian basketball player

Arkansas State Red Wolves
- Position: Small forward
- League: Sun Belt Conference

Personal information
- Born: October 29, 2000 (age 26) Belgrade, Serbia, FR Yugoslavia
- Listed height: 2.03 m (6 ft 8 in)
- Listed weight: 95 kg (209 lb)

Career information
- College: Arkansas State (2020–present)
- Playing career: 2016–present

Career history
- 2016–2019: Dynamic
- 2018–2019: → Proleter Naftagas
- 2019: Vršac
- 2019–2020: Proleter Naftagas

Lazar Grbović (Serbian Cyrillic: Лазар Грбовић; born October 29, 2000) is a Serbian college basketball player for Arkansas State Red Wolves of the Sun Belt Conference.

== Playing career ==
Grbović started his basketball career with the youth team of Kolubara Lazarevac.

Grbović was promoted to Dynamic BG for the 2016–17 season. On October 8, 2016, he made a professional debut in a win against Metalac. On November 11, 2017, he made a Second ABA League debut with Dynamic in a win against AV Ohrid.

== National team career ==
Grbović was a member of the Serbian under-19 team that finished 7th at the 2019 FIBA Under-19 Basketball World Cup in Heraklion, Greece. Over five tournament games, he averaged 1.0 point, 1.6 rebounds and 0.6 assists per game.
