= Lee Aaliya =

Argentine basketballer (born 2004)

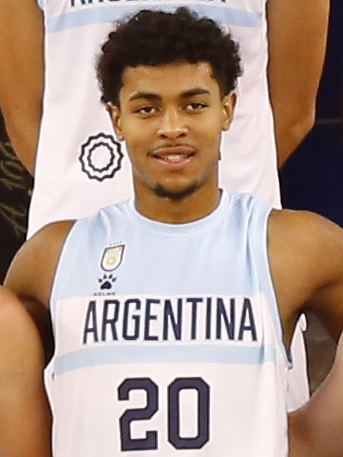

No. 23 – Ohio State Buckeyes
- Position: Power forward
- Conference: Big Ten Conference

Personal information
- Born: 8 November 2004 (age 22) La Plata, Argentina
- Listed height: 6 ft 9 in (2.06 m)
- Listed weight: 235 lb (107 kg)

Career information
- College: Ohio State (2026–present)
- Playing career: 2021–present

Career history
- 2021–2022: Gimnasia y Esgrima (LP)
- 2023: Atenas
- 2024: UCAM Murcia CB
- 2024: →Palmer Basket Mallorca
- 2024–2025: Instituto ACC
- 2025–2026: UCAM Murcia CB
Medals
Men's basketball
Representing Argentina
FIBA South America U17 Championship
Silver medal – second place	2022 Caracas

Lee Abraham Aaliya (born 8 November 2004) is an Argentine college basketball player for the Ohio State Buckeyes of the Big Ten Conference. He made his professional debut for Gimnasia y Esgrima de La Plata in 2021, and most recently played in Spain from 2024 until 2026. Aaliya represents the Argentinian national team.

== Professional career ==
Aaliya's debut was in 2021, for his hometown team where he played since he was a child, Gimnasia y Esgrima de La Plata. He played for Gimnasia y Esgrima for two seasons before transferring to Atenas de Córdoba, where he spent a season. In 2024, he was signed by Spanish Liga ACB team UCAM Murcia CB with a contract for four seasons, and sent on loan to LEB Plata side Palmer Basket Mallorca.

== National team career ==
Aaliya formed part of the Argentina men's basketball team at the 2022 South America U17 Championship, where he won a silver medal. He also formed part of the U18 team that played at the 2022 Americas Championship, at which Argentina placed fourth. In 2023, he was featured in the men's U19 team at the U19 World Cup, held in Debrecen, Hungary. Argentina placed 5th in the competition and Aaliya was named part of the U19 Second All-Tournament Team, finishing fourth in the tournament in scoring and rebounds.

On 25 July 2023, he made his debut for the men's senior national team in a friendly against Catalonia, held in Manresa.

== College career ==
In 2026, Aaliya enrolled at Ohio State University and received three years of NCAA eligibility in the United States.

== Personal life ==
Aaliya's father, Jeff Aaliya (also known as Musambe Tutu), is a Ghanaian-born bodybuilder and professional wrestler who immigrated to Argentina in 1997. His mother, Paula Ansín, is an Argentine national. Aaliya was born in La Plata. His brother, Jefferson Aaliya, is also a professional basketball player for Obras Sanitarias.

He is a practicing Muslim.
