= Berke Büyüktuncel =

Turkish basketball player (born 2004)

Vanderbilt Commodores
- Position: Power forward / small forward
- Conference: Southeastern Conference

Personal information
- Born: September 2, 2004 (age 22) Bursa, Turkey
- Listed height: 6 ft 9 in (2.06 m)
- Listed weight: 215 lb (98 kg)

Career information
- College: UCLA (2023–2024); Nebraska (2024–2026); Vanderbilt (2026–present)
- Playing career: 2021–2023

Career history
- 2021–2023: Tofaş

Career highlights
- College Basketball Crown champion (2025)
Medals
Men's basketball
Representing Turkey
FIBA U19 World Cup
Bronze medal – third place	2023 Hungary	Team
FIBA U18 European Championship
Silver medal – second place	2022 Turkey	Team

Berke Büyüktuncel (born September 2, 2004) is a Turkish college basketball player for the Vanderbilt Commodores of the Southeastern Conference (SEC). He previously played for the UCLA Bruins and Nebraska Cornhuskers.

== Early life and career ==
Büyüktuncel was born and grew up in Bursa, Turkey. He played for the youth teams of Tofaş S.K. Büyüktuncel averaged 11.4 points, 8.5 rebounds, 2.2 assists, 1.5 steals, and 1.5 blocks for the Under-19 team and made his Basketbol Süper Ligi debut with the senior team during the 2020–2021 season.

== College career ==
Büyüktuncel committed to play college basketball in the United States for UCLA and signed a National Letter of Intent on August 5, 2023. He enrolled at UCLA in September 2023 after being granted his release from Tofaş. Büyüktuncel was not declared eligible to play by the NCAA before the start of the Bruins' 2023–24 season. He was cleared to play three games into the season. Hampered by injuries and uneven play, he averaged 4.5 points and 2.5 rebounds in 16.3 minutes per game.

On June 5, 2024, Büyüktuncel transferred to Nebraska.

== National team career ==
Büyüktuncel was named to the Turkey under-18 national team and played in the 2022 FIBA U18 European Championship. He was also selected as Turkey's team captain in the 2023 FIBA Under-19 Basketball World Cup.
