= Yang Hansen =

Chinese basketball player (born 2005)

No. 16 – Portland Trail Blazers
- Position: Center
- League: NBA

Personal information
- Born: June 26, 2005 (age 21) Zibo, Shandong, China
- Listed height: 7 ft 1 in (2.16 m)
- Listed weight: 270 lb (122 kg)

Career information
- High school: Zibo No.11 (Zibo, China)
- NBA draft: 2025: 1st round, 16th overall pick
- Drafted by: Memphis Grizzlies
- Playing career: 2023–present

Career history
- 2023–2025: Qingdao Eagles
- 2025–present: Portland Trail Blazers
- 2025–2026: →Rip City Remix

Career highlights
- 2× CBA All-Star (2024, 2025); 2× All-CBA Domestic First Team (2024, 2025); CBA Defensive Player of the Year (2024); CBA Rookie of the Year (2024, 2025); CYBL U-17 Champions (2021, 2022); CYBL U-17 Tournament Most Valuable Player (2022); CYBL U-17 Tournament Best Defensive Player (2021)
- Stats at NBA.com
- Stats at Basketball Reference
Medals
Men's basketball
Representing China
FIBA Under-18 Asia Cup
Bronze medal – third place	2022 Tehran	Team

Yang Hansen (Chinese: 杨瀚森; born June 26, 2005) is a Chinese professional basketball player for the Portland Trail Blazers of the National Basketball Association (NBA). He was drafted 16th overall by the Memphis Grizzlies before being traded to the Trail Blazers. Yang is the ninth Chinese player to be drafted to the NBA, and the third highest overall to be drafted.

== Early and personal life ==
Yang was born on June 26, 2005, in Zibo, Shandong Province to Yang Lin (Chinese: 杨霖),a factory electrician and a local amateur basketball player, and Zhu Jing (Chinese: 朱静), a pharmeceutical saleswoman. They were 1.97 m (6 ft 5 1/2 in) and 1.80 m (5 ft 11 in) tall, respectively.

Yang started playing basketball when he was a child. He joined the club for training in the third grade of elementary school and later enrolled in Zibo Sports School. Around 2020, at the invitation of Qingdao Guoxin Haitian Club, he entered the club's youth training system. Additionally, after he graduated from Zibo Sports School, he enrolled in Zibo No.11 High School and participated China High School Basketball League (CHBL). In the 2020–21 season, he made the national tournament but was ultimately defeated in the final against Tsinghua University High School.

In 2021, the Qingdao Guoxin Haitian Youth Team defeated Tsinghua High School in the finals to win the China Youth Basketball League (CYBL) Champions for the U-17 group, and Yang was named the Best Defensive Player. In 2022, the Qingdao Guoxin Haitian Youth Team defended the U17 National Championship, and Yang was named the Most Valuable Player.

Additionally, Yang has stated that he likes to sleep, eat and play video games on his PlayStation 5.

== Professional career ==
=== Qingdao Eagles (2023–2025) ===
During the 2023–24 CBA season, Yang was promoted to the Qingdao Eagles' first team to play professional games. On October 23, 2023, he made his professional debut in the first round of the regular season against Beijing Enterprises. In the All-Star Game that season, Yang was selected as the starting player for the North Division Team. During his first season, NBA personnel visited the Qingdao training complex on multiple occasions to observe Yang, but he ultimately chose not to participate in the 2024 NBA draft. Yang was awarded both Rookie of the Year and Defensive Player of the Year honours after the season, after averaging 16.6 points, 10.5 rebounds and three assists per game.

=== Portland Trail Blazers (2025–present) ===
To the surprise of many, on June 25, 2025, Yang was selected by the Memphis Grizzlies as the 16th pick of the 2025 NBA draft. However, he would later have his draft rights traded to the Portland Trail Blazers, alongside future draft considerations, for the rights to Cedric Coward. Yang is the ninth Chinese player to be drafted to the NBA. He is the highest Chinese draft pick since Yi Jianlian in 2007, and the third-highest draft pick ever from China. On Monday, January 26, 2026, the NBA announced that Yang, along with Donovan Clingan, were both announced to be players for the Rising Stars game. In his rookie season, Yang was assigned to the Rip City Remix but was subsequently recalled to the Portland Trail Blazers.

On July 1, 2026, it was announced that Yang would be participating with the Trail Blazers for the 2026 NBA Summer League. After the start of the 2026–27 season, Yang recorded his first career NBA double-double on November 7, 2026, with 12 points, 10 rebounds, one assist and one steal in 26 minutes during a home game against the San Antonio Spurs.

== National team career ==
Yang represented China at the 2023 FIBA Under-19 Basketball World Cup, averaging 12.6 points, 10.4 rebounds (3rd highest in the tournament), 4.7 assists (4th highest in the tournament) and five blocks (highest in the tournament), and was named in the All-Second Team.

In February 2024, he made his national team debut in the 2025 FIBA Asian Cup qualifiers against Mongolia.

== Career statistics ==
Legend
GP	Games played	GS	Games started	MPG	Minutes per game
FG%	Field goal percentage	3P%	3-point field goal percentage	FT%	Free throw percentage
RPG	Rebounds per game	APG	Assists per game	SPG	Steals per game
BPG	Blocks per game	PPG	Points per game	**Bold**	Career high

=== NBA ===
==== Regular season ====
Year	Team	GP	GS	MPG	FG%	3P%	FT%	RPG	APG	SPG	BPG	PPG
2025–26	Portland	43	1	7.0	.310	.119	.824	1.5	.5	.1	.2	2.2
Career		43	1	7.0	.310	.119	.824	1.5	.5	.1	.2	2.2

==== Playoffs ====
Year	Team	GP	GS	MPG	FG%	3P%	FT%	RPG	APG	SPG	BPG	PPG
2026	Portland	4	0	1.1	.000	.000	–	.3	.0	.0	.0	.0
Career		4	0	1.1	.000	.000	–	.3	.0	.0	.0	.0

=== CBA ===
==== Regular season ====
Year	Team	GP	GS	MPG	FG%	3P%	FT%	RPG	APG	SPG	BPG	PPG
2023–24	Qingdao	**51**	**51**	**33.8**	.554	.226	.623	**10.8**	**3.9**	.7	2.2	15.0
2024–25	Qingdao	45	45	33.2	**.586**	**.333**	**.671**	10.5	3.0	**1.0**	**2.6**	**16.6**
Career		96	96	33.5	.569	.291	.647	10.7	3.5	.9	2.4	15.8

==== Playoffs ====
Year	Team	GP	GS	MPG	FG%	3P%	FT%	RPG	APG	SPG	BPG	PPG
2023–24	Qingdao	2	2	**42.5**	.333	.000	.667	**13.5**	**2.0**	**1.5**	3.0	8.0
2024–25	Qingdao	**8**	**7**	34.6	**.667**	.000	**.719**	7.3	1.6	.4	**3.1**	**13.4**
Career		10	9	36.2	.600	.000	.709	8.5	1.7	.6	3.1	12.3
