= Tobe Awaka =

American basketball player (born 2004)

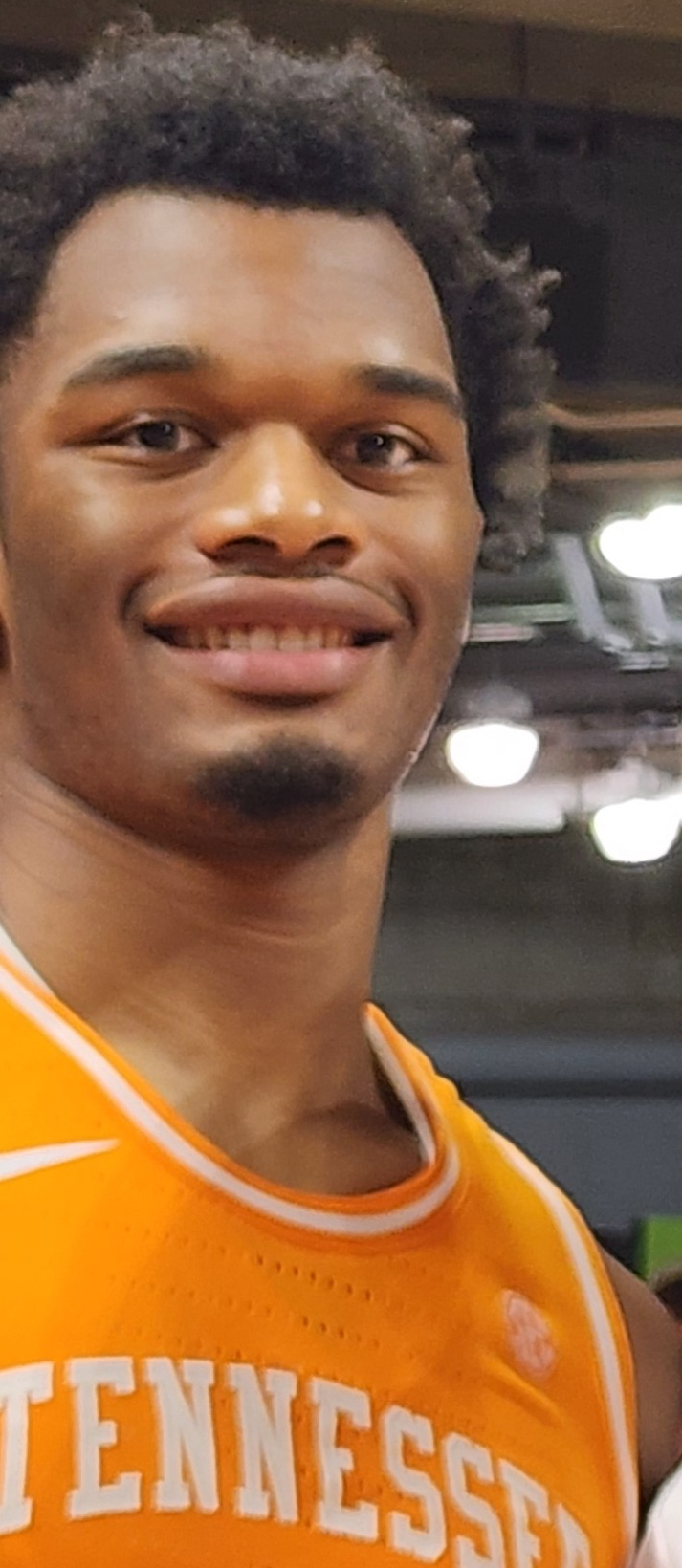
- Awaka with Tennessee in 2024

No. 19 – Chicago Bulls
- Position: Power forward
- League: NBA

Personal information
- Born: January 30, 2004 (age 22) Poughkeepsie, New York, U.S.
- Listed height: 6 ft 8 in (2.03 m)
- Listed weight: 250 lb (113 kg)

Career information
- High school: Cardinal Hayes (Bronx, New York)
- College: Tennessee (2022–2024); Arizona (2024–2026)
- NBA draft: 2026: undrafted
- Playing career: 2026–present

Career history
- 2026–present: Chicago Bulls
- 2026–present: →Windy City Bulls

Career highlights
- Big 12 Sixth Man Award (2026)
- Stats at NBA.com
- Stats at Basketball Reference

Tobe Awaka (born January 30, 2004) is an American basketball player for the Chicago Bulls of the National Basketball Association (NBA), on a two-way contract with the Windy City Bulls of the NBA G League. He played college basketball for the Tennessee Volunteers and Arizona Wildcats.

== Early life and high school ==
During his senior year, Awaka averaged 19.2 points and 13.9 rebounds per game, where he was named the New York Gatorade Player of the Year. Coming out of high school, he was unranked where he committed to play college basketball for the Tennessee Volunteers over other schools such as Maryland, Pittsburgh, and St. John’s.

== College career ==
=== Tennessee ===
As a freshman in 2022-23, Awaka averaged 3.2 points and 3.8 rebounds per game. In the second round of the 2024 NCAA Division I men's basketball tournament, he notched ten points and five rebounds versus Texas. During the 2023-24 season, Awaka averaged 5.1 points and 4.6 rebounds coming off the bench. After the season, he entered his name into the NCAA transfer portal.

=== Arizona ===
Awaka transferred to play for the Arizona Wildcats. On November 9, 2024, he totaled 18 points, 15 rebounds, two blocks, and a steal in a victory over Old Dominion. On January 18, 2025, Awaka posted eight points and 14 rebounds in 26 minutes against Texas Tech. On February 4, he notched 14 points and nine rebounds in a victory versus BYU. On February 8, Awaka recorded 14 points and 11 rebounds in a win against Texas Tech. On February 17, he recorded 14 points and 12 rebounds in 32 minutes of a win over Baylor.

== Professional career ==
After going undrafted in the 2026 NBA draft, Awaka signed a two-way contract with the Chicago Bulls on July 3, 2026.

== Personal life ==
Awaka is the son of Sunny and Henrietta Awaka. He is a Christian.
