= Serbia men's national under-19 basketball team =

Serbia
- FIBA zone: FIBA Europe
- National federation: Basketball Federation of Serbia
- Nickname: Orlići (The Eaglets)

U19 World Cup
- Appearances: 8
- Medals: Gold: 1 (2007); Silver: 2 (2011, 2013)
Medal record
Gold medal – first place	2007 Novi Sad
Silver medal – second place	2011 Riga
Silver medal – second place	2013 Prague

The Serbia men's national under-19 basketball team (Serbian Cyrillic: Кошаркашка репрезентација Србије до 19 година) is the boys' basketball team, administered by Basketball Federation of Serbia, that represents Serbia in international under-19 men's basketball competitions, consisting mainly of the FIBA Under-19 Basketball World Cup.

== World Cup competitive record ==
Year	Pos.	GP	W	L	Ref.
1979–1991	Part of SFR Yugoslavia				
1995–2003	Part of (Federal Republic of Yugoslavia) FR Yugoslavia				
(Serbia) 2007	1st place, gold medalist(s)	9	8	1	
(New Zealand) 2009	Did not qualify				
(Latvia) 2011	2nd place, silver medalist(s)	9	6	3	
(Czech Republic) 2013	2nd place, silver medalist(s)	9	7	2	
(Greece) 2015	9th	7	5	2	
(Egypt) 2017	Did not qualify				
(Greece) 2019	7th	7	5	2	
(Latvia) 2021	4th	7	5	2	
(Hungary) 2023	6th	7	5	2	
(Switzerland) 2025	9th	7	4	3	
(Czech Republic) 2027	Did not qualify				
(Indonesia) 2029	To be determined				
Total	8/17	62	45	17	

== Team ==
=== Rosters ===
2007 Championship	2011 Championship	2013 Championship	2015 Championship	2019 Cup	2021 Cup	2023 Cup
4 Mladen Jeremić; 5 Petar Despotović; 6 Dušan Katnić; 7 Stefan Marković; 8 Marko Kešelj; 9 Aleksandar Radulović; 10 Stefan Stojačić; 11 Marko Čakarević; 12 Milan Mačvan; 13 Miroslav Raduljica; 14 Boban Marjanović; 15 Slaven Čupković	4 Aleksandar Cvetković; 5 Bogić Vujošević; 6 Petar Lambić; 7 Nemanja Krstić; 8 Bogdan Bogdanović; 9 Luka Mitrović; 10 Marko Gujaničić; 11 Nikola Silađi; 12 Nemanja Bešović; 13 Đorđe Drenovac; 14 Luka Igrutinović; 15 Nemanja Dangubić	4 Stefan Pot; 5 Jovan Novak; 6 Miloš Janković; 7 Nikola Jokić; 8 Dušan Kutlešić; 9 Vasilije Micić; 10 Luka Anđušić; 11 Nikola Milutinov; 12 Nikola Janković; 13 Mihajlo Andrić; 14 Ognjen Dobrić; 15 Đoko Šalić	4 Stefan Peno; 5 Aleksandar Aranitović; 6 Vanja Marinković; 7 Danilo Ostojić; 8 Radovan Đoković; 9 Vojislav Stojanović; 10 Ilija Đoković; 11 Stefan Lazarević; 12 Boriša Simanić; 13 Miloš Glišić; 14 Vasilije Vučetić; 15 David Miladinović	3 Filip Petrušev; 6 Ognjen Mićović; 7 Altin Islamović; 11 Zoran Paunović; 12 Uroš Trifunović; 13 Luka Cerovina; 14 Toma Vasiljević; 15 Marko Pecarski; 17 Lazar Grbović; 22 Dalibor Ilić; 23 Aleksa Ćubić; 24 Pavle Kuzmanović	0 Petar Kovačević; 2 Nikola Đurišić; 3 Nikola Jović; 4 Aleksa Kovačević; 7 Stefan Todorović; 10 Mihailo Petrović; 11 Lazar Stefanović; 13 Vojin Medarević; 21 Lazar Joksimović; 33 Mihailo Mušikić; 37 Matija Belić; 50 Filip Škobalj	0 Aleksa Milenković; 1 Luka Vudragović; 4 Đorđe Ćurčić; 5 Ilija Milijašević; 6 Filip Radaković; 8 Jovan Ristić; 10 Marko Šarenac; 11 Vuk Bogunović; 13 Aleksa Čovičković; 17 Lazar Đoković; 23 Nikola Đapa; 44 Filip Borovićanin

=== Coaches ===
Years	Head coach	Assistant coach(es)
2007	Miroslav Nikolić	Branko Maksimović
2009	Did not qualify	—
2011–2013	Dejan Mijatović	Đorđe Adžić, Aleksandar Matović^{2011}, Marko Barać^{2013}
2015	Aleksandar Bućan	Marko Simonović, Aleksandar Bjelić
2017	Did not qualify	—
2019	Aleksandar Bućan	(Bosnia and Herzegovina) Žarko Milaković, Bojan Salatić, Tomislav Tomović
2021	Zoran Lukić	Goran Vučković, Dušan Jelić
2023	Vladimir Đokić	Stevan Mijović

== Individual awards ==
Most Valuable Player

- Milan Mačvan — 2007

World Cup All-Tournament Team

- Aleksandar Cvetković — 2011
- Vasilije Micić — 2013
- Nikola Jović — 2021

Statistical leaders: Points

- Marko Pecarski – 2019

Statistical leaders: Top Performers

- Filip Petrušev – 2019

== See also ==
- Serbian men's university basketball team
- Serbia men's national under-20 basketball team
- Serbia men's national under-18 basketball team
- Serbia men's national under-17 basketball team
- Serbia men's national under-16 basketball team
