= Ege Tan Yıldızoğlu =

Turkish basketball player (born 2004)

No. 30 – Pacific Tigers
- Position: Point guard
- League: West Coast Conference

Personal information
- Born: January 1, 2004 (age 22) Eskişehir, Turkey
- Listed height: 6 ft 3 in (1.91 m)
- Listed weight: 194 lb (88 kg)

Career information
- College: Pacific (2023-present)
- Playing career: 2021–present

Career history
- 2021–2023: Galatasaray Nef
Medals
Men's basketball
Representing Turkey
FIBA U19 World Cup
Bronze medal – third place	2023 Hungary	Team

Ege Tan Yıldızoğlu (born January 1, 2004) is a Turkish college basketball player who plays for Pacific Tigers of the West Coast Conference (WCC).

== Early years ==
Yıldızoğlu is a basketball player from Tarsus American College. He also played in Mersin Büyükşehir Belediyesi team.

== Professional career ==
=== Galatasaray Nef ===
He has been playing for Galatasaray Nef since 2021.

== Personal life ==
His mother is Aylin Yıldızoğlu, a former Turkish Women's National Team Basketball Player. His father is Ceyhun Yıldızoğlu, the basketball coach of the Turkish Women's National Team.
