= Spain men's national under-19 basketball team =

Spain
- FIBA ranking: 7th
- FIBA zone: FIBA Europe
- National federation: FEB

U19 World Cup
- Appearances: 12
- Medals: Gold: 2 (1999, 2023); Bronze: 1 (1995)
Home	Away

The Spain men's national under-19 basketball team (Spain Youth national basketball team), is the representative for Spain in international under-19 men's basketball competitions, and it is organized and run by the Spanish Basketball Federation. The Spain national U-19 basketball team represents Spain at the FIBA Under-19 World Championship.

== FIBA Under-19 Basketball World Cup ==
Year	Pos.	Pld	W	L
(Brazil) 1979	did not qualify			
(Spain) 1983	4th	8	4	4
(Italy) 1987	did not qualify			
(Canada) 1991	6th	8	4	4
(Greece) 1995	3rd place, bronze medalist(s)	8	5	3
(Portugal) 1999	1st place, gold medalist(s)	8	7	1
(Greece) 2003	did not qualify			
(Serbia) 2007	8th	9	4	5
(Australia) 2009	10th	8	4	4
(Latvia) 2011	did not qualify			
(Czech Republic) 2013	5th	9	7	2
(Greece) 2015	8th	7	3	4
(Egypt) 2017	4th	7	5	2
(Greece) 2019	did not qualify			
(Latvia) 2021	5th	7	5	2
(Hungary) 2023	1st place, gold medalist(s)	7	7	0
(Switzerland) 2025	did not qualify			
(Czech Republic) 2027	qualified			
(Indonesia) 2029	to be determined			
Total	12/19	79	48	31

== See also ==
- Spanish Basketball Federation
- Spain national youth basketball teams
