= 2021 FIBA U18 European Challengers =

International basketball competitions

Tournament details
- Dates: 3–8 August 2021
- Teams: 32
- Venues: 5 (in 5 host cities)

Official website
- www.fiba.basketball

The 2021 FIBA U18 European Challengers were international basketball competitions which took place from 3 to 8 August 2021, replacing the cancelled 2021 FIBA U18 European Championship.

== History ==
The 2020 edition of FIBA U18 European Championship was to be held in Konya, Turkey but was postponed to 2021 due to COVID-19 pandemic. Since the pandemic continued in 2021, the FIBA Europe decided to hold alternative format of competition to replace traditional format of U18 European Championship where 16 or more teams gather in one place.

== Structure ==
- The events are to be played on a voluntary participation basis, with promotion/relegation to be frozen across Divisions A, B and C.
- The Top 18 ranked teams (16 currently in Division A, plus two additional teams by 2019 ranking in respective category) to play three tournaments of six teams each (Groups A, B and C).
- All other registered teams, ranked 19 and lower, to play in tournaments of up to six teams each (Groups D/E).
- One tournament of up to six teams to be created with the lowest-ranked teams to accommodate Division C and Small Countries (Groups F/G).
- All tournaments to be played in Round Robin format, with groups to be created by "serpentine" style allocation, taking the hosting situation into consideration.

== Participating teams ==
Top-18 Challengers

- Croatia
- Czech Republic
- Estonia
- France
- Georgia
- Germany
- Greece
- Israel
- Latvia
- Lithuania
- North Macedonia
- Poland
- Portugal
- Russia
- Serbia
- Slovenia
- Spain
- Turkey

19–25 Challenger

- Bulgaria
- Hungary
- Ireland
- Romania
- Slovakia
- Switzerland
- Ukraine

26–32 Challenger

- Albania
- Andorra
- Gibraltar
- Kosovo
- Luxembourg
- Malta
- Moldova

== Top-18 Challengers ==
=== Group A ===
The Group A tournament was played in Skopje, North Macedonia.

Pos	Team	Pld	W	L	PF	PA	PD	Pts
1	Spain	5	5	0	391	293	+98	10
2	Serbia	5	4	1	406	349	+57	9
3	Germany	5	3	2	421	381	+40	8
4	Croatia	5	2	3	417	406	+11	7
5	North Macedonia	5	1	4	360	428	−68	6
6	Georgia	5	0	5	286	424	−138	5

Source: FIBA

3 August 2021

Boxscore

Georgia	42–74	Spain

3 August 2021

Boxscore

Germany	78–91	Serbia

3 August 2021

Boxscore

Croatia	108–77	North Macedonia

4 August 2021

Boxscore

Spain	84–65	Germany

4 August 2021

Boxscore

Serbia	86–82	Croatia

4 August 2021

Boxscore

North Macedonia	69–66	Georgia

5 August 2021

Boxscore

Croatia	69–75	Germany

5 August 2021

Boxscore

Georgia	48–91	Serbia

5 August 2021

Boxscore

North Macedonia	62–69	Spain

7 August 2021

Boxscore

Germany	106–58	Georgia

7 August 2021

Boxscore

Spain	96–74	Croatia

7 August 2021

Boxscore

Serbia	88–73	North Macedonia

8 August 2021

Boxscore

Georgia	72–84	Croatia

8 August 2021

Boxscore

Serbia	50–68	Spain

8 August 2021

Boxscore

North Macedonia	79–97	Germany

=== Group B ===
The Group B tournament was played in Tel Aviv, Israel.

Pos	Team	Pld	W	L	PF	PA	PD	Pts
1	Israel	5	4	1	447	372	+75	9
2	Lithuania	5	3	2	389	360	+29	8
3	Estonia	5	3	2	372	366	+6	8
4	France	5	3	2	379	350	+29	8
5	Greece	5	2	3	345	396	−51	7
6	Portugal	5	0	5	316	404	−88	5

Source: FIBA

3 August 2021

Boxscore

Portugal	68–78	France

3 August 2021

Boxscore

Estonia	83–85	Greece

3 August 2021

Boxscore

Lithuania	71–100	Israel

4 August 2021

Boxscore

France	65–75	Estonia

4 August 2021

Boxscore

Greece	69–85	Lithuania

4 August 2021

Boxscore

Israel	102–67	Portugal

5 August 2021

Boxscore

Lithuania	79–66	Estonia

5 August 2021

Boxscore

Portugal	63–70	Greece

5 August 2021

Boxscore

Israel	89–83	France

7 August 2021

Boxscore

Estonia	67–62	Portugal

7 August 2021

Boxscore

France	69–67	Lithuania

7 August 2021

Boxscore

Greece	70–81	Israel

8 August 2021

Boxscore

Portugal	56–87	Lithuania

8 August 2021

Boxscore

Greece	51–84	France

8 August 2021

Boxscore

Israel	75–81	Estonia

=== Group C ===
The Group C tournament was played in Konya, Turkey.

Pos	Team	Pld	W	L	PF	PA	PD	Pts
1	Slovenia	5	5	0	370	292	+78	10
2	Poland	5	3	2	335	332	+3	8
3	Latvia	5	2	3	277	347	−70	7
4	Russia	5	2	3	331	324	+7	7
5	Turkey	5	2	3	331	349	−18	7
6	Czech Republic	5	1	4	308	308	0	6

Source: FIBA

3 August 2021

Boxscore

Czech Republic	48–66	Russia

3 August 2021

Boxscore

Poland	74–81	Turkey

3 August 2021

Boxscore

Slovenia	84–44	Latvia

4 August 2021

Boxscore

Russia	61–77	Poland

4 August 2021

Boxscore

Turkey	67–74	Slovenia

4 August 2021

Boxscore

Latvia	42–78	Czech Republic

5 August 2021

Boxscore

Slovenia	75–53	Poland

5 August 2021

Boxscore

Czech Republic	57–65	Turkey

5 August 2021

Boxscore

Latvia	73–60	Russia

7 August 2021

Boxscore

Poland	65–63	Czech Republic

7 August 2021

Boxscore

Turkey	59–66	Latvia

7 August 2021

Boxscore

Russia	66–67	Slovenia

8 August 2021

Boxscore

Latvia	52–66	Poland

8 August 2021

Boxscore

Turkey	59–78	Russia

8 August 2021

Boxscore

Czech Republic	62–70	Slovenia

== 19–25 Challenger ==
The Groups D/E tournament was played in Levice, Slovakia.

=== Group phase ===
==== Group D ====
Pos	Team	Pld	W	L	PF	PA	PD	Pts	Qualification
1	Bulgaria	2	2	0	181	140	+41	4	19–25 Challenger Final Four
2	Hungary	2	1	1	146	143	+3	3	19–25 Challenger Final Four
3	Ireland	2	0	2	150	194	−44	2	19–25 Challenger Consolation round

Source: FIBA

3 August 2021

Boxscore

Bulgaria	82–51	Hungary

4 August 2021

Boxscore

Hungary	95–61	Ireland

5 August 2021

Boxscore

Ireland	89–99	Bulgaria

==== Group E ====
Pos	Team	Pld	W	L	PF	PA	PD	Pts	Qualification
1	Slovakia	3	2	1	231	224	+7	5	19–25 Challenger Final Four
2	Ukraine	3	2	1	230	210	+20	5	19–25 Challenger Final Four
3	Romania	3	1	2	213	213	0	4	19–25 Challenger Consolation round
4	Switzerland	3	1	2	240	267	−27	4	19–25 Challenger Consolation round

Source: FIBA

3 August 2021

Boxscore

Romania	93–78	Switzerland

3 August 2021

Boxscore

Ukraine	73–79	Slovakia

4 August 2021

Boxscore

Switzerland	68–89	Ukraine

4 August 2021

Boxscore

Slovakia	67–57	Romania

5 August 2021

Boxscore

Romania	63–68	Ukraine

5 August 2021

Boxscore

Slovakia	85–94	Switzerland

=== Consolation round ===
==== Group Z ====
Pos	Team	Pld	W	L	PF	PA	PD	Pts
23	Romania	2	2	0	172	154	+18	4
24	Switzerland	2	1	1	172	176	−4	3
25	Ireland	2	0	2	159	173	−14	2

Source: FIBA

7 August 2021

Boxscore

Ireland	76–79	Romania

8 August 2021

Boxscore

Switzerland	94–83	Ireland

=== Final Four ===
19th–22nd place semifinals
D1	Bulgaria	67
E2	Ukraine	84
E1	Slovakia	59
D2	Hungary	61

19th place match
E2	Ukraine	68
D2	Hungary	80
21st place match
D1	Bulgaria	63
E1	Slovakia	71

==== 19th–22nd place semifinals ====
7 August 2021

Boxscore

Bulgaria	67–84	Ukraine

7 August 2021

Boxscore

Slovakia	59–61	Hungary

==== 21st place match ====
8 August 2021

Boxscore

Bulgaria	63–71	Slovakia

==== 19th place match ====
8 August 2021

Boxscore

Ukraine	68–80	Hungary

=== Final standings ===
Rank	Team
19	Hungary
20	Ukraine
21	Slovakia
22	Bulgaria
23	Romania
24	Switzerland
25	Ireland

== 26–32 Challenger ==
The Groups F/G tournament was played in Tirana, Albania.

=== Group phase ===
==== Group F ====
Pos	Team	Pld	W	L	PF	PA	PD	Pts	Qualification
1	Kosovo	2	2	0	193	107	+86	4	26–32 Challenger Final Four
2	Albania	2	1	1	144	136	+8	3	26–32 Challenger Final Four
3	Moldova	2	0	2	96	190	−94	2	26–32 Challenger Consolation round

Source: FIBA

3 August 2021

Boxscore

Kosovo	85–62	Albania

4 August 2021

Boxscore

Albania	82–51	Moldova

5 August 2021

Boxscore

Moldova	45–108	Kosovo

==== Group G ====
Pos	Team	Pld	W	L	PF	PA	PD	Pts	Qualification
1	Luxembourg	3	3	0	237	156	+81	6	26–32 Challenger Final Four
2	Andorra	3	2	1	205	179	+26	5	26–32 Challenger Final Four
3	Gibraltar	3	1	2	169	197	−28	4	26–32 Challenger Consolation round
4	Malta	3	0	3	168	247	−79	3	26–32 Challenger Consolation round

Source: FIBA

3 August 2021

Boxscore

Luxembourg	97–45	Malta

3 August 2021

Boxscore

Andorra	62–51	Gibraltar

4 August 2021

Boxscore

Malta	57–75	Andorra

4 August 2021

Boxscore

Gibraltar	43–69	Luxembourg

5 August 2021

Boxscore

Luxembourg	71–68	Andorra

5 August 2021

Boxscore

Gibraltar	75–66	Malta

=== Consolation round ===
==== Group X ====
Pos	Team	Pld	W	L	PF	PA	PD	Pts
30	Gibraltar	2	2	0	157	132	+25	4
31	Malta	2	1	1	141	140	+1	3
32	Moldova	2	0	2	131	157	−26	2

Source: FIBA

7 August 2021

Boxscore

Moldova	66–82	Gibraltar

8 August 2021

Boxscore

Malta	75–65	Moldova

=== Final Four ===
26th–29th place semifinals
F1	Kosovo	80
G2	Andorra	71
G1	Luxembourg	64
F2	Albania	63

26th place match
F1	Kosovo	84
G1	Luxembourg	58
28th place match
G2	Andorra	56
F2	Albania	61

==== 26th–29th place semifinals ====
7 August 2021

Boxscore

Kosovo	80–71	Andorra

7 August 2021

Boxscore

Luxembourg	64–63	Albania

==== 28th place match ====
8 August 2021

Boxscore

Andorra	56–61	Albania

==== 26th place match ====
8 August 2021

Boxscore

Kosovo	84–58	Luxembourg

=== Final standings ===
Rank	Team
26	Kosovo
27	Luxembourg
28	Albania
29	Andorra
30	Gibraltar
31	Malta
32	Moldova

== See also ==
- 2021 FIBA U20 European Challengers
- 2021 FIBA U16 European Challengers
- 2021 FIBA U20 Women's European Challengers
- 2021 FIBA U18 Women's European Challengers
- 2021 FIBA U16 Women's European Challengers
