= Andorra men's national under-18 basketball team =

Andorra
- FIBA zone: FIBA Europe
- National federation: Andorran Basketball Federation

U19 World Cup
- Appearances: None

U18 EuroBasket
- Appearances: None

U18 EuroBasket Division B
- Appearances: None

U18 EuroBasket Division C
- Appearances: 17
- Medals: Gold: 2 (2005, 2015); Silver: 3 (1997, 2016, 2026); Bronze: 4 (2003, 2009, 2013, 2014)

The Andorra men's national under-18 basketball team is a national basketball team of Andorra, administered by the Andorran Basketball Federation. It represents the country in international under-18 men's basketball competitions.

The team won 9 medals at the FIBA U18 EuroBasket Division C.

== FIBA U18 EuroBasket Division C record ==
Year	Position	Pld	W	L
(Andorra) 1997	2nd place, silver medalist(s)	5	3	2
(Luxembourg) 1999	4th	5	2	3
(Malta) 2001	5th	4	1	3
(Malta) 2003	3rd place, bronze medalist(s)	4	2	2
(Malta) 2005	1st place, gold medalist(s)	5	5	0
(Wales) 2007	4th	4	3	1
(Malta) 2009	3rd place, bronze medalist(s)	4	2	2
(San Marino) 2011	4th	4	1	3
(Andorra) 2013	3rd place, bronze medalist(s)	5	3	2
(Andorra) 2014	3rd place, bronze medalist(s)	4	3	1
(Gibraltar) 2015	1st place, gold medalist(s)	5	4	1
(San Marino) 2016	2nd place, silver medalist(s)	5	4	1
(Cyprus) 2017	Did not participate			
(Kosovo) 2018	Did not participate			
(Andorra) 2019	6th	6	3	3
(San Marino) 2022	5th	6	4	2
(San Marino) 2023	6th	6	2	4
(Albania) 2024	Did not participate			
(Albania) 2025	4th	6	2	4
(Albania) 2026	2nd place, silver medalist(s)	5	3	2
Total	17/20	83	47	36

== See also ==
- Andorra men's national basketball team
- Andorra men's national under-16 basketball team
- Andorra women's national under-18 basketball team
