= 2007 FIBA Europe Under-18 Championship Division C =

Tournament details
- Host country: Wales
- City: Cardiff
- Dates: 16–21 July 2007
- Teams: 9 (from 1 confederation)
- Venue(s): 1 (in 1 host city)

Final positions
- Champions: Scotland (1st title)
- Runners-up: Wales
- Third place: Moldova

Official website
- www.fibaeurope.com

The 2007 FIBA Europe Under-18 Championship Division C was the sixth edition of the Division C of the FIBA U18 European Championship, the third tier of the European under-18 basketball championship. It was played in Cardiff, Wales, from 16 to 21 July 2007. Scotland men's national under-18 basketball team won the tournament.

== Participating teams ==
- Andorra
- Azerbaijan
- Gibraltar
- Malta
- Moldova
- Monaco
- San Marino
- Scotland
- Wales

== First round ==
=== Group A ===
| Pos | Team | Pld | W | L | PF | PA | PD | Pts | Qualification |
|---|---|---|---|---|---|---|---|---|---|
| 1 | Wales | 2 | 2 | 0 | 199 | 104 | +95 | 4 | 1st–3rd place classification |
| 2 | Andorra | 2 | 1 | 1 | 187 | 180 | +7 | 3 | 4th–6th place classification |
| 3 | Azerbaijan | 2 | 0 | 2 | 120 | 222 | −102 | 2 | 7th–9th place classification |

Source: FIBA Archive

16 July 2007

Boxscore

| Wales | 96–68 | Andorra |

Welsh Institute of Sport

17 July 2007

Boxscore

| Azerbaijan | 36–103 | Wales |

Welsh Institute of Sport

18 July 2007

Boxscore

| Andorra | 119–84 | Azerbaijan |

Welsh Institute of Sport

=== Group B ===
| Pos | Team | Pld | W | L | PF | PA | PD | Pts | Qualification |
|---|---|---|---|---|---|---|---|---|---|
| 1 | Moldova | 2 | 2 | 0 | 168 | 126 | +42 | 4 | 1st–3rd place classification |
| 2 | Gibraltar | 2 | 1 | 1 | 140 | 151 | −11 | 3 | 4th–6th place classification |
| 3 | San Marino | 2 | 0 | 2 | 130 | 161 | −31 | 2 | 7th–9th place classification |

Source: FIBA Archive

16 July 2007

Boxscore

| Gibraltar | 78–66 | San Marino |

Welsh Institute of Sport

17 July 2007

Boxscore

| Moldova | 85–62 | Gibraltar |

Welsh Institute of Sport

18 July 2007

Boxscore

| San Marino | 64–83 | Moldova |

Welsh Institute of Sport

=== Group C ===
| Pos | Team | Pld | W | L | PF | PA | PD | Pts | Qualification |
|---|---|---|---|---|---|---|---|---|---|
| 1 | Scotland | 2 | 2 | 0 | 183 | 132 | +51 | 4 | 1st–3rd place classification |
| 2 | Monaco | 2 | 1 | 1 | 136 | 130 | +6 | 3 | 4th–6th place classification |
| 3 | Malta | 2 | 0 | 2 | 117 | 174 | −57 | 2 | 7th–9th place classification |

Source: FIBA Archive

16 July 2007

[ Boxscore]

| Monaco | 72–49 | Malta |

Welsh Institute of Sport

17 July 2007

Boxscore

| Scotland | 81–64 | Monaco |

Welsh Institute of Sport

18 July 2007

Boxscore

| Malta | 68–102 | Scotland |

Welsh Institute of Sport

== Final round ==
=== 1st–3rd place classification ===
| Pos | Team | Pld | W | L | PF | PA | PD | Pts |
|---|---|---|---|---|---|---|---|---|
| 1 | Scotland | 2 | 2 | 0 | 166 | 117 | +49 | 4 |
| 2 | Wales | 2 | 1 | 1 | 124 | 143 | −19 | 3 |
| 3 | Moldova | 2 | 0 | 2 | 112 | 142 | −30 | 2 |

Source: FIBA Archive

19 July 2007

Boxscore

| Moldova | 57–62 | Wales |

Welsh Institute of Sport

20 July 2007

Boxscore

| Scotland | 80–55 | Moldova |

Welsh Institute of Sport

21 July 2007

Boxscore

| Wales | 62–86 | Scotland |

Welsh Institute of Sport

=== 4th–6th place classification ===
| Pos | Team | Pld | W | L | PF | PA | PD | Pts |
|---|---|---|---|---|---|---|---|---|
| 4 | Andorra | 2 | 2 | 0 | 215 | 163 | +52 | 4 |
| 5 | Monaco | 2 | 1 | 1 | 164 | 151 | +13 | 3 |
| 6 | Gibraltar | 2 | 0 | 2 | 144 | 209 | −65 | 2 |

Source: FIBA Archive

19 July 2007

Boxscore

| Monaco | 80–65 | Gibraltar |

Welsh Institute of Sport

20 July 2007

Boxscore

| Andorra | 86–84 | Monaco |

Welsh Institute of Sport

21 July 2007

Boxscore

| Gibraltar | 79–129 | Andorra |

Welsh Institute of Sport

=== 7th–9th place classification ===
| Pos | Team | Pld | W | L | PF | PA | PD | Pts |
|---|---|---|---|---|---|---|---|---|
| 7 | Malta | 2 | 2 | 0 | 173 | 148 | +25 | 4 |
| 8 | Azerbaijan | 2 | 1 | 1 | 146 | 144 | +2 | 3 |
| 9 | San Marino | 2 | 0 | 2 | 142 | 169 | −27 | 2 |

Source: FIBA Archive

19 July 2007

Boxscore

| Azerbaijan | 74–66 | San Marino |

Welsh Institute of Sport

20 July 2007

Boxscore

| Malta | 95–76 | San Marino |

Welsh Institute of Sport

21 July 2007

Boxscore

| Azerbaijan | 72–78 | Malta |

Welsh Institute of Sport

== Final standings ==
| Rank | Team |
|---|---|
| 1st place, gold medalist(s) | Scotland |
| 2nd place, silver medalist(s) | Wales |
| 3rd place, bronze medalist(s) | Moldova |
| 4 | Andorra |
| 5 | Monaco |
| 6 | Gibraltar |
| 7 | Malta |
| 8 | Azerbaijan |
| 9 | San Marino |
