= 2026 FIBA U18 EuroBasket Division C =

International youth basketball tournament

Tournament details
- Host country: Albania
- City: Shkodër
- Dates: 21–26 July 2026
- Teams: 8 (from 1 confederation)
- Venue: 1 (in 1 host city)

Final positions
- Champions: Kosovo (2nd title)
- Runners-up: Andorra
- Third place: Albania
- Fourth place: Malta

Tournament statistics
- MVP: (Kosovo) Besim Bytyqi
- Top scorer: (Malta) Kai Fabri

Official website
- www.fiba.basketball

The 2026 FIBA U18 EuroBasket Division C was the 20th edition of the Division C of the FIBA U18 EuroBasket, the third tier of the European under-18 men's basketball championship.The tournament was played in Shkodër, Albania, from 21 to 26 July 2026.

Kosovo secured their second overall Division C title with a victory over Andorra in the final, 91–49.

== Participating teams ==
- Albania
- Andorra
- Armenia
- Gibraltar
- Kosovo ▼ (22nd place, 2025 FIBA U18 EuroBasket Division B)
- Malta
- Moldova
- San Marino

== First round ==
The draw of the first round was held on 5 February 2026 in Freising, Germany.

In the first round, the teams were drawn into two groups of four. After a round-robin group stage, the first two teams from each group advanced to the semifinals; the other teams were dropped to the 5th–8th place playoffs.

All times are local (Central European Summer Time; UTC+2).

=== Group A ===
Pos	Team	Pld	W	L	PF	PA	PD	Pts	Qualification
1	Kosovo	3	3	0	276	175	+101	6	Semifinals
2	Andorra	3	2	1	265	212	+53	5	Semifinals
3	Armenia	3	1	2	228	241	−13	4	5th–8th place playoffs
4	Gibraltar	3	0	3	137	278	−141	3	5th–8th place playoffs

Source: FIBA

21 July 2026
13:00

Boxscore

Andorra	79–87 (OT)	Kosovo
Scoring by quarter: 19–24, 21–18, 18–23, 19–12, Overtime: 2–10

Qazim Dervishi Sports Palace

21 July 2026
15:30

Boxscore

Gibraltar	62–82	Armenia
Scoring by quarter: 17–16, 16–18, 18–24, 11–24

Qazim Dervishi Sports Palace

22 July 2026
13:00

Boxscore

Armenia	81–89	Andorra
Scoring by quarter: 34–23, 19–21, 16–25, 12–20

Qazim Dervishi Sports Palace

22 July 2026
20:30

Boxscore

Kosovo	99–31	Gibraltar
Scoring by quarter: 26–10, 26–8, 24–7, 23–6

Qazim Dervishi Sports Palace

23 July 2026
15:30

Boxscore

Kosovo	90–65	Armenia
Scoring by quarter: 22–23, 25–15, 21–12, 22–15

Qazim Dervishi Sports Palace

23 July 2026
20:30

Boxscore

Gibraltar	44–97	Andorra
Scoring by quarter: 17–16, 4–32, 2–31, 21–18

Qazim Dervishi Sports Palace

=== Group B ===
Pos	Team	Pld	W	L	PF	PA	PD	Pts	Qualification
1	Malta	3	2	1	259	206	+53	5	Semifinals
2	Albania (H)	3	2	1	251	206	+45	5	Semifinals
3	Moldova	3	2	1	223	210	+13	5	5th–8th place playoffs
4	San Marino	3	0	3	200	311	−111	3	5th–8th place playoffs

Source: FIBA
(H) Hosts

21 July 2026
18:00

Boxscore

San Marino	67–111	Albania
Scoring by quarter: 12–24, 15–33, 21–28, 19–26

Qazim Dervishi Sports Palace

21 July 2026
20:30

Boxscore

Malta	68–75	Moldova
Scoring by quarter: 14–23, 18–11, 16–19, 20–22

Qazim Dervishi Sports Palace

22 July 2026
15:30

Boxscore

Moldova	94–66	San Marino
Scoring by quarter: 17–25, 27–20, 27–8, 23–13

Qazim Dervishi Sports Palace

22 July 2026
18:00

Boxscore

Albania	64–85	Malta
Scoring by quarter: 19–23, 15–23, 22–16, 8–23

Qazim Dervishi Sports Palace

23 July 2026
13:00

Boxscore

Malta	106–67	San Marino
Scoring by quarter: 17–20, 30–13, 29–18, 30–16

Qazim Dervishi Sports Palace

23 July 2026
18:00

Boxscore

Albania	76–54	Moldova
Scoring by quarter: 17–7, 17–18, 23–14, 19–15

Qazim Dervishi Sports Palace

== 5th–8th place playoffs ==
5th–8th place semifinals
A3	Armenia	88
B4	San Marino	54
B3	Moldova	99
A4	Gibraltar	67

5th place match
Armenia	106
Moldova	96
7th place match
San Marino	52
Gibraltar	57

=== 5th–8th place semifinals ===
25 July 2026
13:00

Boxscore

Armenia	88–54	San Marino
Scoring by quarter: 19–6, 21–22, 19–11, 29–15

Qazim Dervishi Sports Palace

25 July 2026
15:30

Boxscore

Moldova	99–67	Gibraltar
Scoring by quarter: 16–13, 15–24, 24–16, 44–14

Qazim Dervishi Sports Palace

==== 7th place match ====
26 July 2026
13:00

Boxscore

San Marino	52–57	Gibraltar
Scoring by quarter: 12–18, 13–10, 12–14, 15–15

Qazim Dervishi Sports Palace

==== 5th place match ====
26 July 2026
15:30

Boxscore

Armenia	106–96	Moldova
Scoring by quarter: 23–33, 32–21, 26–24, 25–18

Qazim Dervishi Sports Palace

== Championship playoffs ==
Semifinals
A1	Kosovo	83
B2	Albania	51
B1	Malta	66
A2	Andorra	82

Final
Kosovo	91
Andorra	49
3rd place match
Albania	101
Malta	61

=== Semifinals ===
25 July 2026
18:00

Boxscore

Kosovo	83–51	Albania
Scoring by quarter: 25–12, 16–17, 13–7, 29–15

Qazim Dervishi Sports Palace

25 July 2026
20:30

Boxscore

Malta	66–82	Andorra
Scoring by quarter: 15–26, 18–18, 12–15, 21–23

Qazim Dervishi Sports Palace

==== 3rd place match ====
26 July 2026
18:00

Boxscore

Albania	101–61	Malta
Scoring by quarter: 27–8, 16–15, 23–16, 35–22

Qazim Dervishi Sports Palace

==== Final ====
26 July 2026
20:30

Boxscore

Kosovo	91–49	Andorra
Scoring by quarter: 22–15, 21–11, 21–7, 27–16

Qazim Dervishi Sports Palace

== Final standings ==
Rank	Team
1st place, gold medalist(s)	Kosovo
2nd place, silver medalist(s)	Andorra
3rd place, bronze medalist(s)	Albania
4	Malta
5	Armenia
6	Moldova
7	Gibraltar
8	San Marino

== Awards ==
At the conclusion of the tournament, the Most Valuable Player (MVP) award and the All-Star Five selections were announced.

Award	Player
All-Star Five	(Kosovo) Besim Bytyqi
All-Star Five	(Kosovo) Lis Binishi
All-Star Five	(Andorra) Izan Fernandez
All-Star Five	(Albania) Genti Nilo
All-Star Five	(Malta) Kai Fabri
Most Valuable Player	(Kosovo) Besim Bytyqi
