= 2025 FIBA U18 EuroBasket Division C =

Youth international basketball tournament

Tournament details
- Host country: Albania
- City: Tirana
- Dates: 19–27 July 2025
- Teams: 10 (from 1 confederation)
- Venue: 1 (in 1 host city)

Final positions
- Champions: Cyprus (4th title)
- Runners-up: Luxembourg
- Third place: Armenia
- Fourth place: Andorra

Tournament statistics
- MVP: (Luxembourg) Sean Bugeja
- Top scorer: (San Marino) Thomas Gasperoni

Official website
- www.fiba.basketball

The 2025 FIBA U18 EuroBasket Division C was the 19th edition of the Division C of the European basketball championship for men's under-18 national teams. The tournament was held in Tirana, Albania, from 19 to 27 July 2025.

== Participating teams ==
- Albania
- Andorra
- Armenia
- Cyprus ▼ (22nd place, 2024 FIBA U18 EuroBasket Division B)
- Gibraltar
- Luxembourg
- Malta
- Moldova
- Monaco
- San Marino

== Draw and Format ==
The draw for the first round was held on 28 January 2025 in Freising, Germany.

The teams were drawn into two groups of five. After a round-robin group stage, the top two teams from each group advanced to the semi-finals. The third- and fourth-placed teams advanced to the 5th–8th place playoffs, while the fifth-placed teams played for 9th and 10th place.

== First round ==
All times are local (Central European Summer Time – UTC+2).

=== Group A ===
Pos	Team	Pld	W	L	PF	PA	PD	Pts	Qualification
1	Cyprus	4	4	0	343	204	+139	8	Semifinals
2	Armenia	4	3	1	305	233	+72	7	Semifinals
3	San Marino	4	2	2	268	329	−61	6	5th–8th place playoffs
4	Monaco	4	1	3	235	266	−31	5	5th–8th place playoffs
5	Gibraltar	4	0	4	219	338	−119	4	9th place match

Source: FIBA

19 July 2025
14:30

Boxscore

Cyprus	95–51	Gibraltar
Scoring by quarter: 24–10, 14–19, 25–10, 32–12
Pts: Papadopoulos 26; Rebs: Mannaris 16; Asts: Mannaris 6		Pts: Vaughan 25; Rebs: Navarro 5 Asts: McGlashan 5

Feti Borova – National Olympic Centre
Attendance: 50
Referees: Gintaraw Vitkauskas (LTU), Dumitru Stasiev (MDA), Vojkan Zivkovic (SRB)

19 July 2025
17:00

Boxscore

Armenia	92–59	San Marino
Scoring by quarter: 18–19, 29–20, 26–12, 19–8
Pts: Hatsakorzian 32; Rebs: Hatsakorzian 8 Asts: Nazlukhanyan 4		Pts: Gasperoni 25; Rebs: Gasperoni 9 Asts: Gasperoni 3

Feti Borova – National Olympic Centre
Attendance: 50
Referees: Georgios Poursanidis (GRE), Edison Gjoni (ALB), Sava Cetkovic (MNE)

20 July 2025
13:00

Boxscore

Monaco	57–69	Armenia
Scoring by quarter: 14–13, 11–13, 12–23, 20–20
Pts: Bada 18; Rebs: Bada 15; Asts: Andriamiary 4		Pts: Hatsakorzian 17; Rebs: Masumyan 13; Asts: Agabekyan 6

Feti Borova – National Olympic Centre
Attendance: 50
Referees: Xhelal Mumini (KOS), Megaklis - Konstantinos Marinakis (GRE), Dumitru Stasiev (MDA)

20 July 2025
14:30

Boxscore

San Marino	53–107	Cyprus
Scoring by quarter: 12–21, 14–27, 14–25, 13–34
Pts: Gasperoni 23; Rebs: Gasperoni 6 Asts: San Martini 6		Pts: Papadopoulos 25; Rebs: Mannaris 11; Asts: Constantinou 6

Feti Borova – National Olympic Centre
Attendance: 50
Referees: Serafim Petrov (BUL), Vojkan Zivkovic (SRB), Edison Gjoni (ALB)

21 July 2025
12:00

Boxscore

Gibraltar	64–87	San Marino
Scoring by quarter: 16–24, 11–15, 18–31, 19–17
Pts: Postigo 18; Rebs: Navarro 7 Asts: Postigo 2		Pts: Gasperoni 32; Rebs: Falcioni 9 Asts: Valmaggi 6

Feti Borova – National Olympic Centre
Attendance: 50
Referees: Megaklis - Konstantinos Marinakis (GRE), Xhelal Mumini (KOS), Dumitru Stasiev (MDA)

21 July 2025
17:00

Boxscore

Cyprus	72–37	Monaco
Scoring by quarter: 17–8, 13–5, 24–8, 18–16
Pts: Georgiou 12; Rebs: Mannaris 9 Asts: Georgiou 6		Pts: Rossi 12; Rebs: Rossi 10; Asts: Andriamiary 2

Feti Borova – National Olympic Centre
Attendance: 50
Referees: Gintaras Vitkauskas (LTU), Zoran Mitrovski (MKD), Sava Cetkovic (MNE)

23 July 2025
12:00

Boxscore

Armenia	63–69	Cyprus
Scoring by quarter: 22–18, 12–16, 17–14, 12–21
Pts: Hatsakorzian 14; Rebs: Hatsakorzian 11; Asts: Hatsakorzian 2		Pts: Georgiou 17; Rebs: Mannaris 8 Asts: Solomou 3

Feti Borova – National Olympic Centre
Attendance: 70
Referees: Xhelal Mumini (KOS), Edison Gjoni (ALB), Serafim Petrov (BUL)

23 July 2025
17:00

Boxscore

Monaco	75–56	Gibraltar
Scoring by quarter: 19–16, 20–15, 9–13, 27–12
Pts: Majone 26; Rebs: Majone 23; Asts: Andriamiary 8		Pts: Postigo 20; Rebs: Sobhi 6 Asts: McGlashan 4

Feti Borova – National Olympic Centre
Attendance: 50
Referees: Georgios Poursanidis (GRE), Megaklis - Konstantinos Marinakis (GRE), Vojkan Zivkovic (SRB)

24 July 2025
14:30

Boxscore

San Marino	69–66	Monaco
Scoring by quarter: 14–14, 17–17, 20–11, 18–24
Pts: Valmaggi 32; Rebs: Falcioni 8 Asts: Pagliarani 5		Pts: Rossi 13; Rebs: Majone11; Asts: Rossi 4

Feti Borova – National Olympic Centre
Attendance: 60
Referees: Xhelal Mumini (KOS), Edison Gjoni(ALB), Dumitru Stasiev (MDA)

24 July 2025
19:30

Boxscore

Gibraltar	48–81	Armenia
Scoring by quarter: 8–7, 17–25, 13–16, 10–33
Pts: Navarro 9 Rebs: Sobhi 8 Asts: O'Connor 3		Pts: Hatsakorzian 20; Rebs: Avagyan 11; Asts: Sanamian 4

Feti Borova – National Olympic Centre
Attendance: 50
Referees: Megaklis - Konstantinos Marinakis (GRE), Sava Cetkovic (MNE), Vojkan Zivkovic (SRB)

=== Group B ===
Pos	Team	Pld	W	L	PF	PA	PD	Pts	Qualification
1	Luxembourg	4	4	0	302	234	+68	8	Semifinals
2	Andorra	4	2	2	306	270	+36	6	Semifinals
3	Albania	4	2	2	282	232	+50	6	5th–8th place playoffs
4	Moldova	4	2	2	278	330	−52	6	5th–8th place playoffs
5	Malta	4	0	4	211	313	−102	4	9th place match

Source: FIBA

19 July 2025
12:00

Boxscore

Andorra	101–65	Moldova
Scoring by quarter: 26–20, 31–18, 26–22, 18–5
Pts: Armengol 23; Rebs: Garcia 7 Asts: Aranda 4		Pts: Dontu 27; Rebs: Dontu 10; Asts: Arnaut 4

Feti Borova – National Olympic Centre
Attendance: 50
Referees: Hugo Blanco Marques da Silva (POR), Luka Brekalo (BIH), Tamara Harutyunyan (ARM)

19 July 2025
19:30

Boxscore

Albania	87–40	Malta
Scoring by quarter: 25–7, 21–15, 16–11, 25–7
Pts: Sinani 15; Rebs: Heba 11; Asts: Nilo 4		Pts: Pace 25; Rebs: Dimech 10; Asts: Fabri 4

Feti Borova – National Olympic Centre
Attendance: 200
Referees: Zoran Mitrovski (MKD), Kyriacos Christou (CYP), Stefan Vukovic (MNE)

20 July 2025
18:00

Boxscore

Luxembourg	81–74	Andorra
Scoring by quarter: 24–23, 25–16, 11–15, 21–20
Pts: Sabotic 17; Rebs: Horvat 11; Asts: Bugeja 8		Pts: Armengol 23; Rebs: Aranda 5 Asts: Aranda7

Feti Borova – National Olympic Centre
Attendance: 50
Referees: Zoran Mitrovski (MKD), Hugo Blanco Marques da Silva (POR), Stefan Vukovic (MNE)

20 July 2025
19:30

Boxscore

Moldova	76–70	Albania
Scoring by quarter: 27–13, 13–21, 19–19, 17–17
Pts: Svetenco 27; Rebs: Svetenco 16; Asts: Dontu 5		Pts: Nilo 24; Rebs: Heba 15; Asts: Nilo 2

Feti Borova – National Olympic Centre
Attendance: 100
Referees: Gintaras Vitkauskas (LTU), Luka Brekalo (BIH), Sava Cetkovic (MNE)

21 July 2025
14:30

Boxscore

Malta	69–80	Moldova
Scoring by quarter: 17–16, 19–23, 19–26, 14–15
Pts: Pace 33; Rebs: Dimech 8 Asts: Fabri 4		Pts: Stanila 21; Rebs: Svetenco 17; Asts: Cusniriuc 4

Feti Borova – National Olympic Centre
Attendance: 50
Referees: Hugo Blanco Marques da Silva (POR), Kyriacos Christou (CYP), Stefan Vukovic (MNE)

21 July 2025
19:30

Boxscore

Albania	57–59	Luxembourg
Scoring by quarter: 17–12, 14–16, 17–15, 9–16
Pts: Nilo 18; Rebs: Sinani 11; Asts: Deliallisi 3		Pts: Bugeja 13; Rebs: Sabotic 7 Asts: Daleiden 3

Feti Borova – National Olympic Centre
Attendance: 250
Referees: Georgios Poursanidis (GRE), Serafim Petrov (BUL), Tamara Harutynyan (ARM)

23 July 2025
14:30

Boxscore

Luxembourg	72–46	Malta
Scoring by quarter: 19–16, 19–11, 24–9, 10–10
Pts: Sulcas 12; Rebs: Latinovic 11; Asts: Horvat 3		Pts: Fabri 15; Rebs: Pace 6 Asts: Pace 5

Feti Borova – National Olympic Centre
Attendance: 80
Referees: Zoran Mitrovski (MKD), Luka Brekalo (BIH), Sava Cetkovic (MNE)

23 July 2025
19:30

Boxscore

Andorra	57–68	Albania
Scoring by quarter: 9–12, 8–19, 17–22, 23–15
Pts: Aranda 13; Rebs: Aranda 9 Asts: Armengol 5		Pts: Nilo 27; Rebs: Rushaj 13; Asts: Rushaj 3

Feti Borova – National Olympic Centre
Attendance: 200
Referees: Hugo Blanco Marques da Silva (POR), Stefan Vukovic (MNE), Kyriacos Christou (CYP)

24 July 2025
12:00

Boxscore

Moldova	57–90	Luxembourg
Scoring by quarter: 13–25, 17–19, 13–22, 14–24
Pts: Dontu 19; Rebs: Dontu 9 Asts: Dontu 5		Pts: Brosius 14; Rebs: Latinovic 9 Asts: Bugeja 8

Feti Borova – National Olympic Centre
Attendance: 70
Referees: Georgios Poursanidis (GRE), Luka Brekalo (BIH), Serafim Petrov (BUL)

24 July 2025
17:00

Boxscore

Malta	56–74	Andorra
Scoring by quarter: 14–17, 15–14, 12–26, 15–17
Pts: Fabri 27; Rebs: Pace 13; Asts: Pace 5		Pts: Aranda 19; Rebs: Fernandez 8 Asts: Fernandez 5

Feti Borova – National Olympic Centre
Attendance: 50
Referees: Gintaras Vitkauskas (LTU), Kyriacos Christou (CYP), Tamara Harutyunyan (ARM)

== 9th place match ==
27 July 2025
9:30

Boxscore

Gibraltar	45–78	Malta
Scoring by quarter: 14–21, 12–22, 10–22, 9–13
Pts: Navarro 12; Rebs: O'Connor 8 Asts: McGlashan 4		Pts: Mizzi 17; Rebs: Fabri 12; Asts: Fenech Pace 5

Feti Borova – National Olympic Centre
Attendance: 50
Referees: Dumitru Stasiev (MDA), Stefan Vukovic (MNE), Tamara Harutyunyan (ARM)

== 5th–8th place playoffs ==
5th–8th place semifinals
A3	San Marino	72
B4	Moldova	84
B3	Albania	80
A4	Monaco	41

5th place match
B4	Moldova	66
B3	Albania	88
7th place match
A3	San Marino	79
A4	Monaco	59

=== 5th–8th place semifinals ===
26 July 2025
12:00

Boxscore

Albania	80–41	Monaco
Scoring by quarter: 27–9, 20–13, 13–9, 20–10
Pts: Sinani 18; Rebs: Rushaj 17; Asts: Nilo 4		Pts: Majone 16; Rebs: Majone 13; Asts: Andriamiary 3

Feti Borova – National Olympic Centre
Attendance: 100
Referees: Megaklis - Konstantinos Marinakis (GRE), Xhelal Mumini (KOS), Kyriacos Christou (CYP)

26 July 2025
14:30

Boxscore

San Marino	72–84	Moldova
Scoring by quarter: 13–24, 18–18, 24–23, 17–19
Pts: Valmaggi 23; Rebs: Falcioni 11; Asts: San Martini 6		Pts: Dontu 27; Rebs: Dontu 17; Asts: Stanila 3

Feti Borova – National Olympic Centre
Attendance: 50
Referees: Georgios Poursanidis (GRE), Vojkan Zivkovic (SRB), Sava Cetkovic (MNE)

=== 7th place match ===
27 July 2025
12:00

Boxscore

San Marino	79–59	Monaco
Scoring by quarter: 22–19, 24–14, 12–13, 21–13
Pts: Gasperoni 29; Rebs: San Martini 10; Asts: San Martini 8		Pts: Gremeaux 14; Rebs: Majone 14; Asts: Andriamiary 6

Feti Borova – National Olympic Centre
Attendance: 50
Referees: Megaklis - Konstantinos Marinakis (GRE), Sava Cetkovic (MNE), Vojkan Zivkovic (SRB)

=== 5th place match ===
27 July 2025
14:30

Boxscore

Moldova	66–88	Albania
Scoring by quarter: 14–18, 17–22, 18–27, 17–21
Pts: Stanila 15; Rebs: Dontu 8 Asts: Dontu 4		Pts: Nilo 19; Rebs: Rushaj 10; Asts: Nilo 5

Feti Borova – National Olympic Centre
Attendance: 150
Referees: Zoran Mitrovski (MKD), Serafim Petrov (BUL), Kyriacos Christou (CYP)

== Championship playoffs ==
Semifinals
A1	Cyprus	75
B2	Andorra	61
B1	Luxembourg	74
A2	Armenia	64

Final
A1	Cyprus	70
B1	Luxembourg	60
3rd place match
B2	Andorra	77
A2	Armenia	81

=== Semifinals ===
26 July 2025
17:00

Boxscore

Cyprus	75–61	Andorra
Scoring by quarter: 26–22, 16–12, 14–10, 19–17
Pts: Karagiannis 28; Rebs: Mannaris 10; Asts: Georgiou 7		Pts: Rodriguez Garcia 14; Rebs: Gallego 12; Asts: Rodrigues 6

Feti Borova – National Olympic Centre
Attendance: 100
Referees: Gintaras Vitkauskas (LTU), Luka Brekalo (BIH), Serafim Petrov (BUL)

26 July 2025
14:30

Boxscore

Luxembourg	74–64	Armenia
Scoring by quarter: 15–11, 24–10, 19–13, 16–30
Pts: Bugeja 22; Rebs: Horvat 7 Asts: Horvat 4		Pts: Hatsakorzian 23; Rebs: Hatsakorzian 12; Asts: Hatsakorzian 3

Feti Borova – National Olympic Centre
Attendance: 50
Referees: Zoran Mitrovski (MKD), Hugo Blanco Marques da Silva (POR), Stefan Vukovic (MNE)

=== 3rd place match ===
27 July 2025
17:00

Boxscore

Andorra	77–81	Armenia
Scoring by quarter: 12–18, 24–23, 20–19, 21–21
Pts: Aranda 18; Rebs: Rodriguez Garcia 6 Asts: Santiago 7		Pts: Hatsakorzian 25; Rebs: Masumyan 13; Asts: Hatsakorzian 4

Feti Borova – National Olympic Centre
Attendance: 70
Referees: Georgios Poursanidis (GRE), Xhelal Mumini (KOS), Luka Brekalo (BIH)

=== Final ===
27 July 2025
19:30

Boxscore

Cyprus	70–60	Luxembourg
Scoring by quarter: 20–10, 14–16, 19–15, 17–19
Pts: Mannaris 19; Rebs: Mannaris 7 Asts: Georgiou 7		Pts: Bugeja 15; Rebs: Daleiden 8 Asts: Daleiden 3

Feti Borova – National Olympic Centre
Attendance: 150
Referees: Gintaras Vitkauskas (LTU), Hugo Blanco Marques da Silva (POR), Edison Gjoni (ALB)

== Final standings ==
Rank	Team	Record
1st place, gold medalist(s)	Cyprus	6–0
2nd place, silver medalist(s)	Luxembourg	5–1
3rd place, bronze medalist(s)	Armenia	4–2
4	Andorra	2–4
5	Albania	4–2
6	Moldova	3–3
7	San Marino	3–3
8	Monaco	1–5
9	Malta	1–4
10	Gibraltar	0–5

Promoted to the 2026 FIBA U18 EuroBasket Division B

== Statistics and awards ==
=== Statistical leaders ===
==== Players ====
The tournament statistics for the players were taken from the tournament's official FIBA website.

Points

Name	PPG
(San Marino) Thomas Gasperoni	23.5
(Armenia) Sebastian Hatsakorzian	21.8
(Moldova) Lucian Dontu	19.8
(San Marino) Matteo Valmaggi	18.3
(Andorra) Ignasi Armengol	18.0

Rebounds

Name	RPG
(Monaco) Guilhaume Majone	12.7
(Moldova) Alexei Svetenco	10.7
(Moldova) Lucian Dontu	10.3
(Cyprus) Dimitris Mannaris	10.2
(Albania) Daniel Rushaj	9.6

Assists

Name	APG
(San Marino) Federico San Martini	4.7
(Luxembourg) Sean Bugeja	4.6
(Cyprus) Ioannis Georgiou	4.4
(Andorra) Ignasi Armengol	4.0
(Monaco) Tao Andriamiary	4.0

Blocks

Name	BPG
(Malta) Matteo Rieger	2.3
(Albania) Noel Heba	2.0
(Albania) Daniel Rushaj	1.6
(Armenia) Daniel Sanamian	1.5
(Armenia) Rafayel Masumyan	1.5
(Monaco) Guilhaume Majone	1.5

Steals

Name	SPG
(Andorra) Ignasi Armengol	5.0
(Cyprus) Ioannis Georgiou	4.6
(Monaco) Tao Andriamiary	3.7
(Gibraltar) Pablo Postigo	3.5
(Armenia) Sebastian Hatsakorzian	3.5

Efficiency

Name	EFFPG
(Armenia) Sebastian Hatsakorzian	23.8
(Moldova) Lucian Dontu	22.3
(Andorra) Ignasi Armengol	21.0
(Malta) Sebastian Pace	18.0
(San Marino) Thomas Gasperoni	17.8

==== Teams ====
The tournament statistics for the teams were taken from the tournament's official FIBA website.

Points

Team	PPG
Cyprus	81.3
Albania	75.0
Armenia	75.0
Andorra	74
Luxembourg	72.7

Rebounds

Team	RPG
Albania	50.3
Armenia	49.0
Monaco	47.7
Cyprus	47.3
Moldova	44.7

Assists

Team	APG
Cyprus	20.8
Andorra	18.7
Luxembourg	16.2
Armenia	15.3
Albania	14.5

Blocks

Team	BPG
Albania	5.2
Armenia	4.8
Monaco	4.7
Cyprus	3.7
Moldova	3.0

Steals

Team	SPG
Luxembourg	17.2
Cyprus	17.0
Armenia	15.3
Andorra	12.8
Gibraltar	12.8

Efficiency

Team	EFFPG
Cyprus	104.2
Albania	87.3
Luxembourg	84.6
Armenia	83.2
Andorra	70.8

=== Awards ===
At the conclusion of the tournament, the Most Valuable Player (MVP) award and the All-Star Five selections were announced.

Award	Player
All-Star Five	(Luxembourg) Sean Bugeja
All-Star Five	(Albania) Genti Nilo
All-Star Five	(Cyprus) Michail Karagiannis
All-Star Five	(Armenia) Sebastian Hatsakorzian
All-Star Five	(Moldova) Lucian Dontu
Most Valuable Player	(Luxembourg) Sean Bugeja
