= 2014 FIBA Europe Under-18 Championship Division C =

10th edition of Division C in the FIBA U18 European Championship

Tournament details
- Host country: Andorra
- City: Andorra la Vella
- Dates: 22–27 July 2014
- Teams: 6 (from 1 confederation)
- Venue(s): 1 (in 1 host city)

Final positions
- Champions: Monaco (1st title)
- Runners-up: Gibraltar
- Third place: Andorra

Official website
- www.fibaeurope.com

The 2014 FIBA Europe Under-18 Championship Division C was the 10th edition of the Division C of the FIBA U18 European Championship, the third tier of the European under-18 basketball championship. It was played in Andorra la Vella, Andorra, from 22 to 27 July 2014. Monaco men's national under-18 basketball team won the tournament.

== Participating teams ==
- Andorra
- Gibraltar
- Malta
- Monaco
- San Marino
- Wales

== First round ==
=== Group A ===
Pos	Team	Pld	W	L	PF	PA	PD	Pts	Qualification
1	Andorra	2	2	0	132	96	+36	4	Semifinals
2	Gibraltar	2	1	1	111	116	−5	3	Quarterfinals
3	Wales	2	0	2	108	139	−31	2	Quarterfinals

Source: FIBA Archive

22 July 2014

Boxscore

Wales	55–68	Gibraltar

Poliesportiu Sports Hall

23 July 2014

Boxscore

Gibraltar	43–61	Andorra

Poliesportiu Sports Hall

24 July 2014

Boxscore

Andorra	71–53	Wales

Poliesportiu Sports Hall

=== Group B ===
Pos	Team	Pld	W	L	PF	PA	PD	Pts	Qualification
1	San Marino	2	2	0	122	114	+8	4	Semifinals
2	Monaco	2	1	1	102	95	+7	3	Quarterfinals
3	Malta	2	0	2	118	133	−15	2	Quarterfinals

Source: FIBA Archive

22 July 2014

Boxscore

Malta	49–57	Monaco

Poliesportiu Sports Hall

23 July 2014

Boxscore

Monaco	45–46	San Marino

Poliesportiu Sports Hall

24 July 2014

Boxscore

San Marino	76–69	Malta

Poliesportiu Sports Hall

== Playoffs ==
Quarterfinals
B2	Monaco	72
A3	Wales	41
A2	Gibraltar	66
B3	Malta	51

Semifinals
A1	Andorra	51
B2	Monaco	70
B1	San Marino	43
A2	Gibraltar	69
5th place match
B3	Malta	63
A3	Wales	58

Final
B2	Monaco	66
A2	Gibraltar	38
3rd place match
A1	Andorra	51
B1	San Marino	46

=== Quarterfinals ===
25 July 2014

Boxscore

Monaco	72–41	Wales

Poliesportiu Sports Hall

25 July 2014

Boxscore

Gibraltar	66–51	Malta

Poliesportiu Sports Hall

=== Semifinals ===
26 July 2014

Boxscore

Andorra	51–70	Monaco

Poliesportiu Sports Hall

26 July 2014

Boxscore

San Marino	43–69	Gibraltar

Poliesportiu Sports Hall

=== 5th place match ===
27 July 2014

Boxscore

Malta	63–58	Wales

Poliesportiu Sports Hall

=== 3rd place match ===
27 July 2014

Boxscore

Andorra	51–46	San Marino

Poliesportiu Sports Hall

=== Final ===
27 July 2014

Boxscore

Monaco	66–38	Gibraltar

Poliesportiu Sports Hall

== Final standings ==
Rank	Team
1st place, gold medalist(s)	Monaco
2nd place, silver medalist(s)	Gibraltar
3rd place, bronze medalist(s)	Andorra
4	San Marino
5	Malta
6	Wales
