= 1999 European Promotion Cup for Junior Men =

Basketball tournament

Tournament details
- Host country: Luxembourg
- City: Steinsel
- Dates: 21–25 July 1999
- Teams: 8 (from 1 confederation)
- Venue(s): 1 (in 1 host city)

Final positions
- Champions: Iceland (1st title)
- Runners-up: Ireland
- Third place: Luxembourg

Official website
- www.fibaeurope.com

The 1999 European Promotion Cup for Junior Men was the second edition of the basketball European Promotion Cup for Junior Men, today known as the FIBA U18 European Championship Division C. It was played in Steinsel, Luxembourg, from 21 to 25 July 1999. Iceland men's national under-18 basketball team won the tournament.

== Participating teams ==
- Albania
- Andorra
- Gibraltar
- Iceland
- Ireland
- Luxembourg
- Malta
- Wales

== First round ==
In the first round, the teams were drawn into two groups of four. The first two teams from each group advance to the semifinals, the other teams will play in the 5th–8th place playoffs.

=== Group A ===
Pos	Team	Pld	W	L	PF	PA	PD	Pts	Qualification
1	Luxembourg	3	3	0	257	195	+62	6	Semifinals
2	Andorra	3	2	1	296	183	+113	5	Semifinals
3	Wales	3	1	2	181	206	−25	4	5th–8th place playoffs
4	Malta	3	0	3	104	254	−150	3	5th–8th place playoffs

Source: FIBA Archive

21 July 1999

Boxscore

Andorra	110–31	Malta

21 July 1999

Boxscore

Luxembourg	85–57	Wales

22 July 1999

Boxscore

Wales	63–98	Andorra

22 July 1999

Boxscore

Luxembourg	83–50	Malta

23 July 1999

Boxscore

Malta	23–61	Wales

23 July 1999

Boxscore

Andorra	88–89	Luxembourg

=== Group B ===
Pos	Team	Pld	W	L	PF	PA	PD	Pts	Qualification
1	Iceland	3	3	0	344	120	+224	6	Semifinals
2	Ireland	3	2	1	218	218	0	5	Semifinals
3	Albania	3	1	2	190	242	−52	4	5th–8th place playoffs
4	Gibraltar	3	0	3	112	284	−172	3	5th–8th place playoffs

Source: FIBA Archive

21 July 1999

Boxscore

Albania	51–106	Iceland

21 July 1999

Boxscore

Ireland	86–39	Gibraltar

22 July 1999

Boxscore

Gibraltar	47–79	Albania

22 July 1999

Boxscore

Iceland	119–43	Ireland

23 July 1999

Boxscore

Iceland	119–26	Gibraltar

23 July 1999

Boxscore

Ireland	89–60	Albania

== 5th–8th place playoffs ==
5th–8th place semifinals
A4	Malta	78
B3	Albania	67
B4	Gibraltar	36
A3	Wales	69

5th place match
A4	Malta	62
A3	Wales	66
7th place match
B3	Albania	72
B4	Gibraltar	65

=== 5th–8th place semifinals ===
24 July 1999

Boxscore

Malta	78–67	Albania

24 July 1999

Boxscore

Gibraltar	36–69	Wales

=== 7th place match ===
25 July 1999

Boxscore

Albania	72–65	Gibraltar

=== 5th place match ===
25 July 1999

Boxscore

Malta	62–66	Wales

== Championship playoffs ==
Semifinals
A2	Andorra	72
B1	Iceland	94
B2	Ireland	73
A1	Luxembourg	69

Final
B1	Iceland	93
B2	Ireland	65
3rd place match
A2	Andorra	90
A1	Luxembourg	93

=== Semifinals ===
24 July 1999

Boxscore

Andorra	72–94	Iceland

24 July 1999

Boxscore

Ireland	73–69	Luxembourg

=== 3rd place match ===
25 July 1999

Boxscore

Andorra	90–93	Luxembourg

=== Final ===
25 July 1999

Boxscore

Iceland	93–65	Ireland

== Final standings ==
Rank	Team
1st place, gold medalist(s)	Iceland
2nd place, silver medalist(s)	Ireland
3rd place, bronze medalist(s)	Luxembourg
4	Andorra
5	Wales
6	Malta
7	Albania
8	Gibraltar
