= 2005 Under-18 European Promotion Cup for Men =

Tournament details
- Host country: Malta
- Dates: 25–30 July 2005
- Teams: 8 (from 1 confederation)

Final positions
- Champions: Andorra (1st title)
- Runners-up: Scotland
- Third place: Luxembourg

Official website
- www.fibaeurope.com

The 2005 Under-18 European Promotion Cup for Men was the fifth edition of the basketball European Promotion Cup for U18 men's teams, today known as the FIBA U18 European Championship Division C. It was played in Malta from 25 to 30 July 2005. Andorra men's national under-18 basketball team won the tournament.

== Participating teams ==
- Andorra
- Gibraltar
- Luxembourg
- Malta
- Monaco
- San Marino
- Scotland
- Wales

== First round ==
In the first round, the teams were drawn into two groups of four. The first two teams from each group advance to the semifinals, the other teams will play in the 5th–8th place playoffs.

=== Group A ===
Pos	Team	Pld	W	L	PF	PA	PD	Pts	Qualification
1	Andorra	3	3	0	327	116	+211	6	Semifinals
2	Wales	3	2	1	179	191	−12	5	Semifinals
3	Malta	3	1	2	149	199	−50	4	5th–8th place playoffs
4	Gibraltar	3	0	3	118	267	−149	3	5th–8th place playoffs

Source: FIBA Archive

25 July 2005

Boxscore

Gibraltar	30–117	Andorra

25 July 2005

Boxscore

Malta	45–47	Wales

26 July 2005

Boxscore

Andorra	98–48	Wales

26 July 2005

Boxscore

Gibraltar	40–66	Malta

27 July 2005

Boxscore

Wales	84–48	Gibraltar

27 July 2005

Boxscore

Andorra	112–38	Malta

=== Group B ===
Pos	Team	Pld	W	L	PF	PA	PD	Pts	Qualification
1	Scotland	3	3	0	286	168	+118	6	Semifinals
2	Luxembourg	3	2	1	214	161	+53	5	Semifinals
3	Monaco	3	1	2	196	234	−38	4	5th–8th place playoffs
4	San Marino	3	0	3	137	270	−133	3	5th–8th place playoffs

Source: FIBA Archive

25 July 2005

Boxscore

Luxembourg	63–52	Monaco

25 July 2005

Boxscore

Scotland	106–37	San Marino

26 July 2005

Boxscore

San Marino	36–84	Luxembourg

26 July 2005

Boxscore

Monaco	64–107	Scotland

27 July 2005

Boxscore

San Marino	64–80	Monaco

27 July 2005

Boxscore

Luxembourg	67–73	Scotland

== 5th–8th place playoffs ==
5th–8th place semifinals
A3	Malta	53
B4	San Marino	43
B3	Monaco	81
A4	Gibraltar	25

5th place match
A3	Malta	64
B3	Monaco	85
7th place match
B4	San Marino	61
A4	Gibraltar	46

=== 5th–8th place semifinals ===
29 July 2005

Boxscore

Malta	53–43	San Marino

29 July 2005

Boxscore

Monaco	81–25	Gibraltar

=== 7th place match ===
30 July 2005

Boxscore

San Marino	61–46	Gibraltar

=== 5th place match ===
30 July 2005

Boxscore

Malta	64–85	Monaco

== Championship playoffs ==
Semifinals
A1	Andorra	82
B2	Luxembourg	76
B1	Scotland	80
A2	Wales	35

Final
A1	Andorra	97
B1	Scotland	85
3rd place match
B2	Luxembourg	81
A2	Wales	39

=== Semifinals ===
29 July 2005

Boxscore

Andorra	82–76	Luxembourg

29 July 2005

Boxscore

Scotland	80–35	Wales

=== 3rd place match ===
30 July 2005

Boxscore

Luxembourg	81–39	Wales

=== Final ===
30 July 2005

Boxscore

Andorra	97–85	Scotland

== Final standings ==
Rank	Team
1st place, gold medalist(s)	Andorra
2nd place, silver medalist(s)	Scotland
3rd place, bronze medalist(s)	Luxembourg
4	Wales
5	Monaco
6	Malta
7	San Marino
8	Gibraltar
