= Monaco men's national under-18 basketball team =

Monaco
- FIBA zone: FIBA Europe
- National federation: Fédération Monégasque de Basketball

U19 World Cup
- Appearances: None

U18 EuroBasket
- Appearances: None

U18 EuroBasket Division B
- Appearances: None

U18 EuroBasket Division C
- Appearances: 11
- Medals: Gold: 1 (2014); Silver: 3 (2019, 2022, 2023)

The Monaco men's national under-18 basketball team is a national basketball team of Monaco, administered by the Fédération Monégasque de Basketball. It represents the country in under-18 men's international basketball competitions.

The team won four medals at the FIBA U18 EuroBasket Division C. They competed in this competition for the first time in 2005.

== FIBA U18 EuroBasket participations ==
Year	Result in Division C
2005	5th
2007	5th
2009	6th
2013	4th
2014	1st place, gold medalist(s)
2016	6th

Year	Result in Division C
2018	4th
2019	2nd place, silver medalist(s)
2022	2nd place, silver medalist(s)
2023	2nd place, silver medalist(s)
2025	8th

== See also ==
- Monaco men's national basketball team
- Monaco men's national under-16 basketball team
- Monaco women's national under-18 basketball team
