= 2023 FIBA U18 European Championship Division C =

Tournament details
- Host country: Azerbaijan
- City: Baku
- Dates: 29 July – 6 August 2023
- Teams: 9 (from 1 confederation)
- Venue: 1 (in 1 host city)

Final positions
- Champions: Cyprus (3rd title)
- Runners-up: Monaco
- Third place: Moldova
- Fourth place: Luxembourg

Official website
- www.fiba.basketball

The 2023 FIBA U18 European Championship Division C was the 17th edition of the Division C of the FIBA U18 European Championship, the third tier of the European under-18 basketball championship. It was played from 29 July to 6 August 2023 in Baku, Azerbaijan. Cyprus men's national under-18 basketball team won the tournament.

== Participating teams ==
- Andorra
- Azerbaijan
- Cyprus ▼ (22nd place, 2022 FIBA U18 European Championship Division B)
- Gibraltar
- Luxembourg
- Malta
- Moldova
- Monaco
- San Marino

== First round ==
The draw of the first round was held on 14 February 2023 in Freising, Germany.

In the first round, the teams were drawn into two groups. The first two teams from each group advance to the semifinals; the other teams will play in the 5th–9th place classification group.

=== Group A ===
Pos	Team	Pld	W	L	PF	PA	PD	Pts	Qualification
1	Cyprus	3	3	0	252	126	+126	6	Semifinals
2	Moldova	3	2	1	172	195	−23	5	Semifinals
3	Azerbaijan	3	1	2	185	202	−17	4	5th−9th place classification
4	Malta	3	0	3	139	225	−86	3	5th−9th place classification

Source: FIBA

29 July 2023

Boxscore

Cyprus	85–39	Moldova

Sarkhadchi Sport Center

29 July 2023

Boxscore

Malta	54–73	Azerbaijan

Sarkhadchi Sport Center

31 July 2023

Boxscore

Moldova	63–46	Malta

Sarkhadchi Sport Center

31 July 2023

Boxscore

Azerbaijan	48–78	Cyprus

Sarkhadchi Sport Center

3 August 2023

Boxscore

Malta	39–89	Cyprus

Sarkhadchi Sport Center

3 August 2023

Boxscore

Moldova	70–64	Azerbaijan

Sarkhadchi Sport Center

=== Group B ===
Pos	Team	Pld	W	L	PF	PA	PD	Pts	Qualification
1	Monaco	4	4	0	347	176	+171	8	Semifinals
2	Luxembourg	4	3	1	249	218	+31	7	Semifinals
3	San Marino	4	1	3	216	259	−43	5	5th−9th place classification
4	Andorra	4	1	3	201	264	−63	5	5th−9th place classification
5	Gibraltar	4	1	3	210	306	−96	5	5th−9th place classification

Source: FIBA

29 July 2023

Boxscore

Monaco	78–44	San Marino

Sarkhadchi Sport Center

29 July 2023

Boxscore

Luxembourg	67–48	Gibraltar

Sarkhadchi Sport Center

30 July 2023

Boxscore

Andorra	37–84	Monaco

Sarkhadchi Sport Center

30 July 2023

Boxscore

San Marino	53–67	Luxembourg

Sarkhadchi Sport Center

31 July 2023

Boxscore

Luxembourg	55–38	Andorra

Sarkhadchi Sport Center

31 July 2023

Boxscore

Gibraltar	57–64	San Marino

Sarkhadchi Sport Center

2 August 2023

Boxscore

Andorra	69–70	Gibraltar

Sarkhadchi Sport Center

2 August 2023

Boxscore

Monaco	79–60	Luxembourg

Sarkhadchi Sport Center

3 August 2023

Boxscore

Gibraltar	35–106	Monaco

Sarkhadchi Sport Center

3 August 2023

Boxscore

San Marino	55–57	Andorra

Sarkhadchi Sport Center

== 5th−9th place classification ==
=== Group C ===
Pos	Team	Pld	W	L	PF	PA	PD	Pts
5	Azerbaijan	4	4	0	298	230	+68	8
6	Andorra	4	2	2	245	255	−10	6
7	San Marino	4	2	2	243	238	+5	6
8	Malta	4	1	3	226	265	−39	5
9	Gibraltar	4	1	3	252	276	−24	5

Source: FIBA

4 August 2023

Boxscore

Azerbaijan	75–58	Gibraltar

Sarkhadchi Sport Center

4 August 2023

Boxscore

Malta	49–64	Andorra

Sarkhadchi Sport Center

5 August 2023

Boxscore

Andorra	55–81	Azerbaijan

Sarkhadchi Sport Center

5 August 2023

Boxscore

San Marino	61–55	Malta

Sarkhadchi Sport Center

6 August 2023

Boxscore

Azerbaijan	69–63	San Marino

Sarkhadchi Sport Center

6 August 2023

Boxscore

Malta	68–67	Gibraltar

Sarkhadchi Sport Center

== Playoffs ==
Semifinals
A1	Cyprus	70
B2	Luxembourg	63
B1	Monaco	98
A2	Moldova	63

Final
A1	Cyprus	68
B1	Monaco	48
3rd place match
B2	Luxembourg	68
A2	Moldova	76

=== Semifinals ===
5 August 2023

Boxscore

Cyprus	70–63	Luxembourg

Sarkhadchi Sport Center

5 August 2023

Boxscore

Monaco	98–63	Moldova

Sarkhadchi Sport Center

=== 3rd place match ===
6 August 2023

Boxscore

Luxembourg	68–76	Moldova

Sarkhadchi Sport Center

=== Final ===
6 August 2023

Boxscore

Cyprus	68–48	Monaco

Sarkhadchi Sport Center

== Final standings ==
Rank	Team
1st place, gold medalist(s)	Cyprus
2nd place, silver medalist(s)	Monaco
3rd place, bronze medalist(s)	Moldova
4	Luxembourg
5	Azerbaijan
6	Andorra
7	San Marino
8	Malta
9	Gibraltar

Promoted to the 2024 FIBA U18 EuroBasket Division B
