= 2016 FIBA U18 European Championship Division C =

Under-18 basketball tournament

Tournament details
- Host country: San Marino
- City: Serravalle
- Dates: 8–15 July 2016
- Teams: 9 (from 1 confederation)

Final positions
- Champions: Azerbaijan (1st title)
- Runners-up: Andorra
- Third place: Kosovo

Official website
- www.fiba.basketball

The 2016 FIBA U18 European Championship Division C was the 12th edition of the Division C of FIBA U18 European Championship. The competition took place in Serravalle, San Marino, from 8 to 15 July 2016.

Azerbaijan won its first ever gold in this event by beating Andorra in the final, 74–57.

== Participating teams ==
- Andorra
- Azerbaijan
- Gibraltar
- Kosovo
- Malta
- Moldova
- Monaco
- San Marino
- Wales

== First round ==
In this round, the 9 teams are allocated in two groups with four teams in Group A and five teams in Group B.

All times are local (UTC+2).

=== Group A ===
Pos	Team	Pld	W	L	PF	PA	PD	Pts	Team advances to
1	Andorra	3	3	0	258	172	+86	6	Semifinals
2	Azerbaijan	3	2	1	227	184	+43	5	Semifinals
3	Gibraltar	3	1	2	185	251	−66	4	Classification group 5–9
4	Monaco	3	0	3	185	248	−63	3	Classification group 5–9

Source: FIBA
Rules for classification: 1) Points; 2) Head-to-head results; 3) Points difference; 4) Points scored.

8 July 2016
11:30

Boxscore

Andorra	69–59	Azerbaijan
Scoring by quarter: 13–14, 13–16, 18–14, 25–15
Pts: Schneider, Vives 16; Rebs: Guzmán 11; Asts: Vives 5		Pts: Poladkhanli 24; Rebs: Mammadov 15; Asts: Poladkhanli 5

Arena Domus, Serravalle
Referees:
(Bosnia and Herzegovina) Petar Obradovic
(San Marino) Gian Luigi Giancecchi
(Wales) Gavin Williams

8 July 2016
14:00

Boxscore

Gibraltar	78–64	Monaco
Scoring by quarter: 23–19, '25–7, 20–20, 10–18
Pts: Santos 27; Rebs: Santos 11; Asts: Gil 10		Pts: Voulfor 32; Rebs: B Motillon 10; Asts: B Motillon 4

Arena Domus, Serravalle
Referees:
(Croatia) Josip Radojkovic
(Moldova) Dumitru Stasiev
(Bulgaria) Vladimir Tsekov

10 July 2016
12:00

Boxscore

Azerbaijan	89–54	Gibraltar
Scoring by quarter: 21–13, 18–16, 27–18, 23–7
Pts: Mammadov 22; Rebs: Mammadov 17; Asts: Ahmadzada, Keinashvili 6		Pts: Santos 27; Rebs: Gil 7 Asts: Gil 7

Arena Domus, Serravalle
Referees:
(Austria) Goran Sljivic
(Bosnia and Herzegovina) Petar Obradovic
(Moldova) Dumitru Stasiev

10 July 2016
14:30

Boxscore

Monaco	60–91	Andorra
Scoring by quarter: 15–19, 14–24, 7–25, 24–23
Pts: Voulfor 26; Rebs: Voulfor 8 Asts: Tomatis, Mandine 2		Pts: Bartolomé 17; Rebs: Bartolomé 18; Asts: Schneider 5

Arena Domus, Serravalle
Referees:
(Wales) Gavin Williams
(San Marino) Gian Luigi Giancecchi
(Croatia) Josip Radojkovic

12 July 2016
12:00

Boxscore

Gibraltar	53–98	Andorra
Scoring by quarter: 16–30, 14–'22, 14–26, 9–20
Pts: Gil 24; Rebs: García 4 Asts: Gil 4		Pts: Schneider 20; Rebs: Bartolomé 10; Asts: Peña 6

Arena Domus, Serravalle
Referees:
(Latvia) Juris Kokainis
(Montenegro) Milosav Kaludjerovic
(Bulgaria) Vladimir Tsekov

12 July 2016
14:30

Boxscore

Azerbaijan	79–61	Monaco
Scoring by quarter: 20–13, 18–16, 27–15, 14–17
Pts: Poladkhanli 24; Rebs: Poladkhanli 20; Asts: Poladkhanli 5		Pts: Voulfor 24; Rebs: B Motillon 12; Asts: D Motillon 4

Arena Domus, Serravalle
Referees:
(Wales) Gavin Williams
(San Marino) Gian Luigi Giancecchi
(Moldova) Dumitru Stasiev

=== Group B ===
Pos	Team	Pld	W	L	PF	PA	PD	Pts	Team advances to
1	Kosovo	4	4	0	388	235	+153	8	Semifinals
2	San Marino	4	3	1	287	275	+12	7	Semifinals
3	Wales	4	2	2	260	266	−6	6	Classification group 5–9
4	Malta	4	1	3	281	357	−76	5	Classification group 5–9
5	Moldova	4	0	4	267	350	−83	4	Classification group 5–9

Source: FIBA
Rules for classification: 1) Points; 2) Head-to-head results; 3) Points difference; 4) Points scored.

8 July 2016
16:30

Boxscore

Malta	87–79	Moldova
Scoring by quarter: 20–20, 19–21, 21–20, 27–18
Pts: Felice Pace 23; Rebs: Felice Pace 10; Asts: Felice Pace 4		Pts: Raducan 22; Rebs: Raducan 12; Asts: Jarcov, Legosin 2

Arena Domus, Serravalle
Referees:
(Gibraltar) Shane Bassett
(Montenegro) Milosav Kaludjerovic
(Latvia) Juris Kokainis

8 July 2016
19:00

Boxscore

Kosovo	86–54	San Marino
Scoring by quarter: 14–17, 28–19, 19–14, 25–4
Pts: Peci 20; Rebs: Shala 13; Asts: Shala 5		Pts: G Ugolini 11; Rebs: P Ugolini 9 Asts: Liberti, Alfarano 3

Arena Domus, Serravalle
Referees:
(Azerbaijan) Alakbar Hasanov
(Andorra) Igor Esteve Malmierca
(Austria) Goran Sljivic

9 July 2016
17:00

Boxscore

Wales	62–76	Kosovo
Scoring by quarter: 8–22, 20–22, 18–10, 16–22
Pts: Carter 25; Rebs: Carter 11; Asts: Howell 4		Pts: Gashi 17; Rebs: Shala 15; Asts: Herc, Peci 2

Arena Domus, Serravalle
Referees:
(Latvia) Juris Kokainis
(Gibraltar) Shane Bassett
(Azerbaijan) Alakbar Hasanov

9 July 2016
19:30

Boxscore

San Marino	86–74	Malta
Scoring by quarter: 16–29, 17–22, 25–12, 28–11
Pts: Pasolini 27; Rebs: P Ugolini 13; Asts: G Ugolini 4		Pts: M Formosa 28; Rebs: Gouder 11; Asts: Felice Pace 5

Arena Domus, Serravalle
Referees:
(Bulgaria) Vladimir Tsekov
(Bosnia and Herzegovina) Petar Obradovic
(Croatia) Josip Radojkovic

10 July 2016
17:00

Boxscore

Malta	59–82	Wales
Scoring by quarter: 12–19, 12–26, 23–25, 12–12
Pts: N Formosa 18; Rebs: Grech 9 Asts: Felice Pace 2		Pts: Koukouravas 19; Rebs: Carter 13; Asts: Koukouravas, Pettitt 4

Arena Domus, Serravalle
Referees:
(Montenegro) Milosav Kaludjerovic
(Gibraltar) Shane Bassett
(Andorra) Igor Esteve Malmierca

10 July 2016
19:30

Boxscore

Moldova	68–78	San Marino
Scoring by quarter: 14–23, 19–16, 18–15, 17–24
Pts: Raducan 15; Rebs: Raducan 12; Asts: Miscov 2		Pts: Giacomini 18; Rebs: Pasolini 6 Asts: Giacomini 2

Arena Domus, Serravalle
Referees:
(Latvia) Juris Kokainis
(Azerbaijan) Alakbar Hasanov
(Bulgaria) Vladimir Tsekov

11 July 2016
17:00

Boxscore

Kosovo	110–61	Malta
Scoring by quarter: 27–21, 28–12, 20–11, 35–17
Pts: Shala 21; Rebs: Shala 11; Asts: Peci 7		Pts: Gouder 13; Rebs: Wait 6 Asts: Mifsud Bonnici, Felice Pace, N Formosa 3

Arena Domus, Serravalle
Referees:
(Austria) Goran Sljivic
(Moldova) Dumitru Stasiev
(Wales) Gavin Williams

11 July 2016
19:30

Boxscore

Wales	69–62	Moldova
Scoring by quarter: 17–11, 18–24, 17–18, 17–9
Pts: Carter 29; Rebs: Carter 10; Asts: Howell, Horrigan 3		Pts: Legosin 14; Rebs: Raducan 16; Asts: Vrabii 3

Arena Domus, Serravalle
Referees:
(Andorra) Igor Esteve Malmierca
(San Marino) Gian Luigi Giancecchi
(Montenegro) Milosav Kaludjerovic

12 July 2016
17:00

Boxscore

Moldova	58–116	Kosovo
Scoring by quarter: 15–38, 17–27, 18–23, 8–30
Pts: Rebeja 14; Rebs: Miscov 8 Asts: Vrabii 4		Pts: Peci 25; Rebs: Haxhosaj 15; Asts: Shala 8

Arena Domus, Serravalle
Referees:
(Bosnia and Herzegovina) Petar Obradovic
(Gibraltar) Shane Bassett
(Andorra) Igor Esteve Malmierca

12 July 2016
19:30

Boxscore

San Marino	69–47	Wales
Scoring by quarter: 16–9, 17–11, 21–20, 15–7
Pts: P Ugolini 19; Rebs: P Ugolini 13; Asts: G Ugolini 4		Pts: Koukouravas 20; Rebs: Carter 14; Asts: 4 Players 2

Arena Domus, Serravalle
Referees:
(Austria) Goran Sljivic
(Azerbaijan) Alakbar Hasanov
(Croatia) Josip Radojkovic

== Classification group for 5th–9th place ==
Pos	Team	Pld	W	L	PF	PA	PD	Pts
5	Wales	4	4	0	306	259	+47	8
6	Monaco	4	2	2	297	313	−16	6
7	Malta	4	2	2	300	315	−15	6
8	Moldova	4	1	3	292	310	−18	5
9	Gibraltar	4	1	3	291	289	+2	5

Source: FIBA
Rules for classification: 1) Points; 2) Head-to-head results; 3) Points difference; 4) Points scored.

13 July 2016
17:00

Boxscore

Gibraltar	62–64	Moldova
Scoring by quarter: 12–20, 19–13, 20–22, 11–9
Pts: Gil, Garcia 16; Rebs: Santos 16; Asts: Gil 7		Pts: Duminica 17; Rebs: Raducan 12; Asts: Cretu 5

Arena Domus, Serravalle
Referees:
(Austria) Goran Sljivic
(Croatia) Josip Radojkovic
(Wales) Gavin Williams

13 July 2016
19:30

Boxscore

Malta	69–72	Monaco
Scoring by quarter: 22–22, 13–14, 9–22, 25–14
Pts: N Formosa 28; Rebs: Gouder 15; Asts: Mifsud Bonnici, N Formosa 4		Pts: Tomatis 30; Rebs: Voulfor 15; Asts: Piras, Izelaar 3

Arena Domus, Serravalle
Referees:
(Bosnia and Herzegovina) Petar Obradovic
(Andorra) Igor Esteve Malmierca
(Azerbaijan) Alakbar Hasanov

14 July 2016
12:00

Boxscore

Wales	76–69	Gibraltar
Scoring by quarter: 26–18, 15–11, 14–20, 21–20
Pts: Carter 18; Rebs: Carter 13; Asts: Howell, Carter 5		Pts: Gil 22; Rebs: Santos 12; Asts: Rodriguez 6

Arena Domus, Serravalle
Referees:
(Bosnia and Herzegovina) Petar Obradovic
(Croatia) Josip Radojkovic
(Moldova) Dumitru Stasiev

14 July 2016
14:30

Boxscore

Monaco	92–87 (OT)	Moldova
Scoring by quarter: 23–14, 21–17, 18–27, 18–22, Overtime: 12–7
Pts: Voulfor 45; Rebs: Trautmann 8 Asts: Motillon 5		Pts: Zalujnii 19; Rebs: Raducan 23; Asts: Rebeja 5

Arena Domus, Serravalle
Referees:
(Austria) Goran Sljivic
(Andorra) Igor Esteve Malmierca
(Montenegro) Milosav Kaludjerovic

15 July 2016
10:00

Boxscore

Gibraltar	82–85	Malta
Scoring by quarter: 26–19, 28–16, 9–21, 19–29
Pts: Gil 33; Rebs: Santos 9 Asts: Gil 9		Pts: Gouder 20; Rebs: Grech 15; Asts: Felice Pace, N Formosa 6

Arena Domus, Serravalle
Referees:
(Azerbaijan) Alakbar Hasanov
(San Marino) Gian Luigi Giancecchi
(Montenegro) Milosav Kaludjerovic

15 July 2016
12:30

Boxscore

Wales	79–69	Monaco
Scoring by quarter: 18–17, 18–25, 22–12, 21–15
Pts: Pettitt 22; Rebs: Freeman 11; Asts: Koukouravas 8		Pts: Voulfor 31; Rebs: Izelaar 13; Asts: Voulfor 7

Arena Domus, Serravalle
Referees:
(Gibraltar) Shane Bassett
(Andorra) Igor Esteve Malmiera
(Moldova) Dumitru Stasiev

== Final round ==
Semifinals
14 July – 19:30
Andorra	89
San Marino	63
14 July – 17:00
Kosovo	66
Azerbaijan	77

Final
15 July – 17:30
Andorra	57
Azerbaijan	74
Third place
15 July – 15:00
San Marino	57
Kosovo	100

=== Semifinals ===
14 July 2016
17:00

Boxscore

Kosovo	66–77	Azerbaijan
Scoring by quarter: 12–26, 22–16, 13–17, 19–18
Pts: Janjeva, Peci, Shala 12; Rebs: Janjeva 10; Asts: Bunjaku 6		Pts: Poladkhanli 24; Rebs: Poladkhanli 10; Asts: Ahmadzada, Mammadli, Poladkhanli 4

Arena Domus, Serravalle
Referees:
(Gibraltar) Shane Bassett
(San Marino) Gian Luigi Giancecchi
(Bulgaria) Vladimir Tsekov

14 July 2016
19:30

Boxscore

Andorra	89–63	San Marino
Scoring by quarter: 22–15, 16–11, 26–17, 25–20
Pts: Guzman 23; Rebs: A Bartolome 21; Asts: Ricart 11		Pts: P Ugolini 25; Rebs: G Ugolini 8 Asts: G Ugolini 4

Arena Domus, Serravalle
Referees:
(Latvia) Juris Kokainis
(Azerbaijan) Alakbar Hasanov
(Wales) Gavin Williams

=== Third place game ===
15 July 2016
15:00

Boxscore

San Marino	57–100	Kosovo
Scoring by quarter: 10–30, 17–24, 17–21, 13–25
Pts: P Ugolini 18; Rebs: Pasolini 6 Asts: Pasolini 2		Pts: Gashi 16; Rebs: Shala 18; Asts: Bunjaku 7

Arena Domus, Serravalle
Referees:
(Bulgaria) Vladimir Tsekov
(Latvia) Juris Kokainis
(Wales) Gavin Williams

=== Final ===
15 July 2016
17:30

Boxscore

Andorra	57–74	Azerbaijan
Scoring by quarter: 11–12, 13–20, 8–19, 25–23
Pts: A Bartolome 23; Rebs: A Bartolome, Guzman 11; Asts: Ricart 5		Pts: Ahmadzada 25; Rebs: Poladkhanli 15; Asts: Ahmadzada, Poladkhanli 4

Arena Domus, Serravalle
Referees:
(Bosnia and Herzegovina) Petar Obradovic
(Croatia) Josip Radojkovic
(Austria) Goran Sljivic

== Final standings ==
Rank	Team	Record
Gold medal	Azerbaijan	4–1
Silver medal	Andorra	4–1
Bronze medal	Kosovo	5–1
4th	San Marino	3–3
5th	Wales	4–2
6th	Monaco	2–4
7th	Malta	2–4
8th	Moldova	1–5
9th	Gibraltar	1–5
