= Armenia men's national under-18 basketball team =

Armenia
- FIBA zone: FIBA Europe
- National federation: Basketball Federation of Armenia

U19 World Cup
- Appearances: None

U18 EuroBasket
- Appearances: None

U18 EuroBasket Division B
- Appearances: 1
- Medals: None

U18 EuroBasket Division C
- Appearances: 7
- Medals: Bronze: 1 (2025)

The Armenia men's national under-18 basketball team is a national basketball team of Armenia, administered by the Basketball Federation of Armenia. It represents the country in international under-18 men's basketball competitions.

== FIBA U18 EuroBasket participations ==
Year	Division B	Division C
2007	20th	
2017		6th
2018		8th
2019		8th
2022		8th
2024		4th
2025		3rd place, bronze medalist(s)
2026		5th

== See also ==
- Armenia men's national basketball team
- Armenia men's national under-16 basketball team
- Armenia women's national under-18 basketball team
