= Wales men's national under-18 basketball team =

Wales
- FIBA zone: FIBA Europe
- National federation: Basketball Wales

U19 World Cup
- Appearances: None

U18 EuroBasket
- Appearances: None

U18 EuroBasket Division B
- Appearances: None

U18 EuroBasket Division C
- Appearances: 9
- Medals: Gold: 1 (2011); Silver: 1 (2007); Bronze: 1 (2015)

The Wales men's national under-18 basketball team is a national basketball team of Wales, administered by Basketball Wales. It represents the country in international under-18 men's basketball competitions.

The team won three medals at the FIBA U18 EuroBasket Division C.

== FIBA U18 EuroBasket participations ==
Year	Result in Division C
1999	5th
2005	4th
2007	2nd place, silver medalist(s)
2009	5th
2011	1st place, gold medalist(s)
2013	6th
2014	6th
2015	3rd place, bronze medalist(s)
2016	5th

== See also ==
- Wales men's national basketball team
- Wales men's national under-16 basketball team
- Wales women's national under-18 basketball team
