= 2019 FIBA U18 European Championship Division C =

Tournament details
- Host country: Andorra
- City: Andorra la Vella
- Dates: 28 July – 4 August 2019
- Teams: 9 (from 1 confederation)
- Venue(s): 2 (in 1 host city)

Final positions
- Champions: Cyprus (2nd title)
- Runners-up: Monaco
- Third place: Albania

Official website
- www.fiba.basketball

The 2019 FIBA U18 European Championship Division C was the 15th edition of the Division C of the FIBA U18 European basketball championship. It was played in Andorra la Vella, Andorra, from 28 July to 4 August 2019. Nine teams participated in the competition. Cyprus men's national under-18 basketball team won the tournament.

== Participating teams ==
- Albania ▼ (24th place, 2018 FIBA U18 European Championship Division B)
- Andorra
- Armenia
- Cyprus
- Gibraltar
- Malta
- Moldova
- Monaco
- San Marino

== First round ==
=== Group A ===
Pos	Team	Pld	W	L	PF	PA	PD	Pts	Qualification
1	Cyprus	3	3	0	235	166	+69	6	Semifinals
2	Monaco	3	2	1	246	184	+62	5	Semifinals
3	Andorra	3	1	2	191	194	−3	4	5th–9th place classification
4	Moldova	3	0	3	137	265	−128	3	5th–9th place classification

Source: FIBA

28 July 2019

Boxscore

Cyprus	80–77	Monaco

Poliesportiu Sports Hall

28 July 2019

Boxscore

Andorra	87–48	Moldova

Poliesportiu Sports Hall

30 July 2019

Boxscore

Moldova	38–90	Cyprus

Poliesportiu Sports Hall

30 July 2019

Boxscore

Monaco	81–53	Andorra

Poliesportiu Sports Hall

1 August 2019

Boxscore

Monaco	88–51	Moldova

Poliesportiu Sports Hall

1 August 2019

Boxscore

Andorra	51–65	Cyprus

Poliesportiu Sports Hall

=== Group B ===
Pos	Team	Pld	W	L	PF	PA	PD	Pts	Qualification
1	Albania	4	4	0	320	247	+73	8	Semifinals
2	San Marino	4	2	2	249	250	−1	6	Semifinals
3	Malta	4	2	2	270	288	−18	6	5th–9th place classification
4	Gibraltar	4	2	2	263	272	−9	6	5th–9th place classification
5	Armenia	4	0	4	255	300	−45	4	5th–9th place classification

Source: FIBA

28 July 2019

Boxscore

Armenia	81–82	Malta

Poliesportiu Sports Hall

28 July 2019

Boxscore

San Marino	47–79	Albania

Poliesportiu Sports Hall

29 July 2019

Boxscore

Gibraltar	49–72	San Marino

Poliesportiu Sports Hall

29 July 2019

Boxscore

Albania	77–57	Armenia

Poliesportiu Sports Hall

30 July 2019

Boxscore

Armenia	57–69	Gibraltar

Poliesportiu Sports Hall

30 July 2019

Boxscore

Malta	67–80	Albania

Poliesportiu Sports Hall

31 July 2019

Boxscore

Gibraltar	69–59	Malta

Poliesportiu Sports Hall

31 July 2019

Boxscore

San Marino	72–60	Armenia

Poliesportiu Sports Hall

1 August 2019

Boxscore

Albania	84–76	Gibraltar

Poliesportiu Sports Hall

1 August 2019

Boxscore

Malta	62–58	San Marino

Poliesportiu Sports Hall

== 5th–9th place classification ==
Pos	Team	Pld	W	L	PF	PA	PD	Pts
5	Gibraltar	4	4	0	333	258	+75	8
6	Andorra	4	3	1	319	276	+43	7
7	Malta	4	2	2	264	252	+12	6
8	Armenia	4	1	3	305	292	+13	5
9	Moldova	4	0	4	201	344	−143	4

Source: FIBA

2 August 2019

Boxscore

Andorra	81–76	Armenia

Poliesportiu Sports Hall

2 August 2019

Boxscore

Moldova	47–95	Gibraltar

Poliesportiu Sports Hall

3 August 2019

Boxscore

Malta	71–46	Moldova

Poliesportiu Sports Hall

3 August 2019

Boxscore

Gibraltar	100–95	Andorra

Poliesportiu Sports Hall

4 August 2019

Boxscore

Andorra	56–52	Malta

Poliesportiu Sports Hall

4 August 2019

Boxscore

Moldova	60–91	Armenia

Poliesportiu Sports Hall

== Championship playoffs ==
Semifinals
A1	Cyprus	77
B2	San Marino	57
B1	Albania	62
A2	Monaco	82

Final
A1	Cyprus	67
A2	Monaco	59
3rd place match
B2	San Marino	58
B1	Albania	66

=== Semifinals ===
3 August 2019

Boxscore

Cyprus	77–57	San Marino

Poliesportiu Sports Hall

3 August 2019

Boxscore

Albania	62–82	Monaco

Poliesportiu Sports Hall

=== 3rd place match ===
4 August 2019

Boxscore

San Marino	58–66	Albania

Poliesportiu Sports Hall

=== Final ===
4 August 2019

Boxscore

Cyprus	67–59	Monaco

Poliesportiu Sports Hall

== Final standings ==
Rank	Team
1st place, gold medalist(s)	Cyprus
2nd place, silver medalist(s)	Monaco
3rd place, bronze medalist(s)	Albania
4	San Marino
5	Gibraltar
6	Andorra
7	Malta
8	Armenia
9	Moldova

Promoted to the 2022 FIBA U18 European Championship Division B
