= 2009 FIBA Europe Under-18 Championship Division C =

Tournament details
- Host country: Malta
- City: Valletta
- Dates: 20–25 July 2009
- Teams: 7 (from 1 confederation)
- Venue: 1 (in 1 host city)

Final positions
- Champions: Malta (1st title)
- Runners-up: Gibraltar
- Third place: Andorra

Official website
- www.fibaeurope.com

The 2009 FIBA Europe Under-18 Championship Division C was the seventh edition of the Division C of the FIBA U18 European Championship, the third tier of the European under-18 basketball championship. It was played in Valletta, Malta, from 20 to 25 July 2009. The host team, Malta, won the tournament.

== Participating teams ==
- Andorra
- Gibraltar
- Malta
- Moldova
- Monaco
- San Marino
- Wales

== First round ==
=== Group A ===
Pos	Team	Pld	W	L	PF	PA	PD	Pts	Qualification
1	Malta	3	3	0	217	154	+63	6	Semifinals
2	Moldova	3	2	1	183	181	+2	5	Semifinals
3	Monaco	3	1	2	192	219	−27	4	5th–7th place classification
4	San Marino	3	0	3	194	232	−38	3	5th–7th place classification

Source: FIBA Archive

20 July 2009

Boxscore

Moldova	67–64	Monaco

Ta Qali Sports Pavilion

20 July 2009

Boxscore

Malta	76–66	San Marino

Ta Qali Sports Pavilion

21 July 2009

Boxscore

San Marino	56–77	Moldova

Ta Qali Sports Pavilion

21 July 2009

Boxscore

Monaco	49–80	Malta

Ta Qali Sports Pavilion

22 July 2009

Boxscore

Monaco	79–72	San Marino

Ta Qali Sports Pavilion

22 July 2009

Boxscore

Malta	61–39	Moldova

Ta Qali Sports Pavilion

=== Group B ===
Pos	Team	Pld	W	L	PF	PA	PD	Pts	Qualification
1	Gibraltar	2	2	0	142	119	+23	4	Semifinals
2	Andorra	2	1	1	141	144	−3	3	Semifinals
3	Wales	2	0	2	120	140	−20	2	5th–7th place classification

Source: FIBA Archive

20 July 2009

Boxscore

Andorra	64–79	Gibraltar

Ta Qali Sports Pavilion

21 July 2009

Boxscore

Gibraltar	63–55	Wales

Ta Qali Sports Pavilion

22 July 2009

Boxscore

Wales	65–77	Andorra

Ta Qali Sports Pavilion

== 5th–7th place classification ==
Pos	Team	Pld	W	L	PF	PA	PD	Pts
5	Wales	2	2	0	198	138	+60	4
6	Monaco	2	1	1	136	165	−29	3
7	San Marino	2	0	2	153	184	−31	2

Source: FIBA Archive

24 July 2009

Boxscore

Monaco	57–93	Wales

Ta Qali Sports Pavilion

25 July 2009

Boxscore

Wales	105–81	San Marino

Ta Qali Sports Pavilion

== Playoffs ==
Semifinals
A1	Malta	102
B2	Andorra	84
B1	Gibraltar	59
A2	Moldova	57

Final
A1	Malta	75
B1	Gibraltar	38
3rd place match
B2	Andorra	76
A2	Moldova	71

=== Semifinals ===
24 July 2009

Boxscore

Malta	102–84	Andorra

Ta Qali Sports Pavilion

24 July 2009

[ Boxscore]

Gibraltar	59–57	Moldova

Ta Qali Sports Pavilion

=== 3rd place match ===
25 July 2009

Boxscore

Andorra	76–71	Moldova

Ta Qali Sports Pavilion

=== Final ===
25 July 2009

Boxscore

Malta	75–38	Gibraltar

Ta Qali Sports Pavilion

== Final standings ==
Rank	Team
1st place, gold medalist(s)	Malta
2nd place, silver medalist(s)	Gibraltar
3rd place, bronze medalist(s)	Andorra
4	Moldova
5	Wales
6	Monaco
7	San Marino
