= 2022 FIBA U18 European Championship Division C =

Tournament details
- Host country: San Marino
- City: Serravalle
- Dates: 24–31 July 2022
- Teams: 10 (from 1 confederation)
- Venue: 1 (in 1 host city)

Final positions
- Champions: Albania (2nd title)
- Runners-up: Monaco
- Third place: Azerbaijan
- Fourth place: Luxembourg

Official website
- www.fiba.basketball

The 2022 FIBA U18 European Championship Division C was the 16th edition of the Division C of the FIBA U18 European basketball championship. It was played from 24 to 31 July 2022 in Serravalle, San Marino. Albania men's national under-18 basketball team won the tournament.

== Participating teams ==
- Albania
- Andorra
- Armenia
- Azerbaijan
- Gibraltar
- Luxembourg ▼ (24th place, 2019 FIBA U18 European Championship Division B)
- Malta
- Moldova
- Monaco
- San Marino

== First round ==
The draw of the first round was held on 15 February 2022 in Freising, Germany.

In the first round, the teams were drawn into two groups of five. The first two teams from each group advance to the semifinals; the third and fourth teams advance to the 5th–8th place playoffs; the last teams will play the 9th place match.

=== Group A ===
Pos	Team	Pld	W	L	PF	PA	PD	Pts	Qualification
1	Monaco	4	4	0	376	238	+138	8	Semifinals
2	Albania	4	3	1	273	226	+47	7	Semifinals
3	Andorra	4	2	2	273	259	+14	6	5th–8th place playoffs
4	Malta	4	1	3	208	315	−107	5	5th–8th place playoffs
5	San Marino	4	0	4	231	323	−92	4	9th place match

Source: FIBA

24 July 2022

Boxscore

Malta	47–88	Andorra

Arena Domus, Serravalle

24 July 2022

Boxscore

Albania	79–61	San Marino

Arena Domus, Serravalle

25 July 2022

Boxscore

Monaco	82–56	Albania

Arena Domus, Serravalle

25 July 2022

Boxscore

San Marino	51–66	Malta

Arena Domus, Serravalle

26 July 2022

Boxscore

Malta	59–86	Monaco

Arena Domus, Serravalle

26 July 2022

Boxscore

Andorra	73–61	San Marino

Arena Domus, Serravalle

27 July 2022

Boxscore

Albania	90–36	Malta

Arena Domus, Serravalle

27 July 2022

Boxscore

Monaco	103–65	Andorra

Arena Domus, Serravalle

28 July 2022

Boxscore

Andorra	47–48	Albania

Arena Domus, Serravalle

28 July 2022

Boxscore

San Marino	58–105	Monaco

Arena Domus, Serravalle

=== Group B ===
Pos	Team	Pld	W	L	PF	PA	PD	Pts	Qualification
1	Azerbaijan	4	4	0	341	262	+79	8	Semifinals
2	Luxembourg	4	3	1	306	225	+81	7	Semifinals
3	Moldova	4	2	2	274	253	+21	6	5th–8th place playoffs
4	Armenia	4	1	3	274	300	−26	5	5th–8th place playoffs
5	Gibraltar	4	0	4	199	354	−155	4	9th place match

Source: FIBA

24 July 2022

Boxscore

Gibraltar	64–81	Armenia

Arena Domus, Serravalle

24 July 2022

Boxscore

Luxembourg	69–56	Moldova

Arena Domus, Serravalle

25 July 2022

Boxscore

Azerbaijan	75–71	Luxembourg

Arena Domus, Serravalle

25 July 2022

Boxscore

Moldova	70–40	Gibraltar

Arena Domus, Serravalle

26 July 2022

Boxscore

Armenia	69–82	Moldova

Arena Domus, Serravalle

26 July 2022

Boxscore

Gibraltar	60–115	Azerbaijan

Arena Domus, Serravalle

27 July 2022

Boxscore

Luxembourg	88–35	Gibraltar

Arena Domus, Serravalle

27 July 2022

Boxscore

Azerbaijan	76–65	Armenia

Arena Domus, Serravalle

28 July 2022

Boxscore

Moldova	66–75	Azerbaijan

Arena Domus, Serravalle

28 July 2022

Boxscore

Armenia	59–78	Luxembourg

Arena Domus, Serravalle

== 9th place match ==
31 July 2022

Boxscore

San Marino	69–51	Gibraltar

Arena Domus, Serravalle

== 5th–8th place playoffs ==
5th–8th place semifinals
A3	Andorra	69
B4	Armenia	57
B3	Moldova	58
A4	Malta	74

5th place match
A3	Andorra	73
A4	Malta	60
7th place match
B4	Armenia	65
B3	Moldova	70

=== 5th–8th place semifinals ===
30 July 2022

Boxscore

Andorra	69–57	Armenia

Arena Domus, Serravalle

30 July 2022

Boxscore

Moldova	58–74	Malta

Arena Domus, Serravalle

=== 7th place match ===
31 July 2022

Boxscore

Armenia	65–70	Moldova

Arena Domus, Serravalle

=== 5th place match ===
31 July 2022

Boxscore

Andorra	73–60	Malta

Arena Domus, Serravalle

== Championship playoffs ==
Semifinals
A1	Monaco	80
B2	Luxembourg	65
B1	Azerbaijan	56
A2	Albania	76

Final
A1	Monaco	78
A2	Albania	93
3rd place match
B2	Luxembourg	73
B1	Azerbaijan	78

=== Semifinals ===
30 July 2022

Boxscore

Monaco	80–65	Luxembourg

Arena Domus, Serravalle

30 July 2022

Boxscore

Azerbaijan	56–76	Albania

Arena Domus, Serravalle

=== 3rd place match ===
31 July 2022

Boxscore

Luxembourg	73–78	Azerbaijan

Arena Domus, Serravalle

=== Final ===
31 July 2022

Boxscore

Monaco	78–93	Albania

Arena Domus, Serravalle

== Final standings ==
Rank	Team
1st place, gold medalist(s)	Albania
2nd place, silver medalist(s)	Monaco
3rd place, bronze medalist(s)	Azerbaijan
4	Luxembourg
5	Andorra
6	Malta
7	Moldova
8	Armenia
9	San Marino
10	Gibraltar
