= Scotland men's national under-18 basketball team =

Youth basketball team representing Scotland

Scotland
- FIBA zone: FIBA Europe
- National federation: Basketballscotland

U19 World Cup
- Appearances: None

U18 EuroBasket
- Appearances: None

U18 EuroBasket Division B
- Appearances: 8
- Medals: None

U18 EuroBasket Division C
- Appearances: 4
- Medals: Gold: 1 (2007); Silver: 3 (2001, 2003, 2005)

The Scotland men's national under-18 basketball team is a national basketball team of Scotland, administered by Basketballscotland. It represents the country in international under-18 men's basketball competitions.

The team participated at eight FIBA U18 EuroBasket Division B tournaments. They also won four medals at the FIBA U18 EuroBasket Division C.

== FIBA U18 EuroBasket participations ==
Year	Division B	Division C
2001		2nd place, silver medalist(s)
2003		2nd place, silver medalist(s)
2005		2nd place, silver medalist(s)
2006	18th	
2007		1st place, gold medalist(s)
2009	16th	

Year	Division B
2010	14th
2012	22nd
2013	22nd
2014	19th
2015	20th
2016	22nd

== See also ==
- Scotland men's national basketball team
- Scotland men's national under-16 basketball team
- Scotland women's national under-18 basketball team
