= 2013 FIBA Europe Under-18 Championship Division C =

Tournament details
- Host country: Andorra
- City: Andorra la Vella
- Dates: 15–20 July 2013
- Teams: 6 (from 1 confederation)
- Venue(s): 1 (in 1 host city)

Final positions
- Champions: San Marino (1st title)
- Runners-up: Moldova
- Third place: Andorra

Official website
- www.fibaeurope.com

The 2013 FIBA Europe Under-18 Championship Division C was the ninth edition of the Division C of the FIBA U18 European Championship, the third tier of the European under-18 basketball championship. It was played in Andorra la Vella, Andorra, from 15 to 20 July 2013. San Marino men's national under-18 basketball team won the tournament.

== Participating teams ==
- Andorra
- Gibraltar
- Moldova
- Monaco
- San Marino
- Wales

== First round ==
=== Group A ===
Pos	Team	Pld	W	L	PF	PA	PD	Pts	Qualification
1	Moldova	2	2	0	173	137	+36	4	Semifinals
2	San Marino	2	1	1	132	152	−20	3	Quarterfinals
3	Wales	2	0	2	144	160	−16	2	Quarterfinals

Source: FIBA Archive

15 July 2013

Boxscore

Wales	82–83	Moldova

Poliesportiu Sports Hall

16 July 2013

Boxscore

Moldova	90–55	San Marino

Poliesportiu Sports Hall

17 July 2013

Boxscore

San Marino	77–62	Wales

Poliesportiu Sports Hall

=== Group B ===
Pos	Team	Pld	W	L	PF	PA	PD	Pts	Qualification
1	Monaco	2	2	0	138	115	+23	4	Semifinals
2	Andorra	2	1	1	148	124	+24	3	Quarterfinals
3	Gibraltar	2	0	2	101	148	−47	2	Quarterfinals

Source: FIBA Archive

15 July 2013

Boxscore

Monaco	61–54	Gibraltar

Poliesportiu Sports Hall

16 July 2013

Boxscore

Gibraltar	47–87	Andorra

Poliesportiu Sports Hall

17 July 2013

Boxscore

Andorra	61–77	Monaco

Poliesportiu Sports Hall

== Playoffs ==
Quarterfinals
B2	Andorra	61
A3	Wales	49
A2	San Marino	76
B3	Gibraltar	48

Semifinals
A1	Moldova	83
B2	Andorra	67
B1	Monaco	70
A2	San Marino	74
5th place match
B3	Gibraltar	60
A3	Wales	56

Final
A1	Moldova	100
A2	San Marino	103
3rd place match
B2	Andorra	70
B1	Monaco	50

=== Quarterfinals ===
18 July 2013

Boxscore

San Marino	76–48	Gibraltar

Poliesportiu Sports Hall

18 July 2013

Boxscore

Andorra	61–49	Wales

Poliesportiu Sports Hall

=== Semifinals ===
19 July 2013

Boxscore

Moldova	83–67	Andorra

Poliesportiu Sports Hall

19 July 2013

Boxscore

Monaco	70–74	San Marino

Poliesportiu Sports Hall

=== 5th place match ===
19 July 2013

Boxscore

Gibraltar	60–56	Wales

Poliesportiu Sports Hall

=== 3rd place match ===
20 July 2013

Boxscore

Andorra	70–50	Monaco

Poliesportiu Sports Hall

=== Final ===
20 July 2013

Boxscore

Moldova	100–103	San Marino

Poliesportiu Sports Hall

== Final standings ==
Rank	Team
1st place, gold medalist(s)	San Marino
2nd place, silver medalist(s)	Moldova
3rd place, bronze medalist(s)	Andorra
4	Monaco
5	Gibraltar
6	Wales
