= San Marino men's national under-18 basketball team =

San Marino
- FIBA zone: FIBA Europe
- National federation: San Marino Basketball Federation

U19 World Cup
- Appearances: None

U18 EuroBasket
- Appearances: None

U18 EuroBasket Division B
- Appearances: None

U18 EuroBasket Division C
- Appearances: 17
- Medals: Gold: 1 (2013); Silver: 1 (2011)

The San Marino men's national under-18 basketball team is a national basketball team of San Marino, administered by the San Marino Basketball Federation. It represents the country in international under-18 men's basketball competitions.

The team won two medals at the FIBA U18 EuroBasket Division C.

== FIBA U18 EuroBasket participations ==
Year	Result in Division C
1997	4th
2005	7th
2007	9th
2009	6th
2011	2nd place, silver medalist(s)
2013	1st place, gold medalist(s)
2014	4th
2015	5th
2016	4th

Year	Result in Division C
2017	7th
2018	6th
2019	4th
2022	9th
2023	7th
2024	5th
2025	7th
2026	8th

== See also ==
- San Marino men's national basketball team
- San Marino men's national under-16 basketball team
