= 2001 European Promotion Cup for Junior Men =

Tournament details
- Host country: Malta
- City: Valletta
- Dates: 11–15 July 2001
- Teams: 7 (from 1 confederation)
- Venue(s): 1 (in 1 host city)

Final positions
- Champions: Cyprus (1st title)
- Runners-up: Scotland
- Third place: Luxembourg

Official website
- www.fibaeurope.com

The 2001 European Promotion Cup for Junior Men was the third edition of the basketball European Promotion Cup for Junior Men, today known as the FIBA U18 European Championship Division C. It was played in Valletta, Malta, from 11 to 15 July 2001. Cyprus men's national under-18 basketball team won the tournament.

== Participating teams ==
- Albania
- Andorra
- Cyprus
- Gibraltar
- Luxembourg
- Malta
- Scotland

== First round ==
In the first round, the teams were drawn into two groups. The first two teams from each group advance to the semifinals, the other teams will play in the 5th–7th place classification.

=== Group A ===
Pos	Team	Pld	W	L	PF	PA	PD	Pts	Qualification
1	Cyprus	3	3	0	280	156	+124	6	Semifinals
2	Luxembourg	3	2	1	227	214	+13	5	Semifinals
3	Malta	3	1	2	166	222	−56	4	5th–7th place classification
4	Andorra	3	0	3	213	294	−81	3	5th–7th place classification

Source: FIBA Archive

11 July 2001

Boxscore

Luxembourg	96–69	Andorra

11 July 2001

Boxscore

Cyprus	68–35	Malta

12 July 2001

Boxscore

Andorra	68–111	Cyprus

12 July 2001

Boxscore

Malta	44–78	Luxembourg

13 July 2001

Boxscore

Luxembourg	53–101	Cyprus

13 July 2001

Boxscore

Malta	87–76	Andorra

=== Group B ===
Pos	Team	Pld	W	L	PF	PA	PD	Pts	Qualification
1	Scotland	2	2	0	201	94	+107	4	Semifinals
2	Albania	2	1	1	161	114	+47	3	Semifinals
3	Gibraltar	2	0	2	63	217	−154	2	5th–7th place classification

Source: FIBA Archive

11 July 2001

Boxscore

Scotland	117–33	Gibraltar

12 July 2001

Boxscore

Gibraltar	30–100	Albania

13 July 2001

Boxscore

Scotland	84–61	Albania

== 5th–7th place classification ==
Pos	Team	Pld	W	L	PF	PA	PD	Pts
5	Malta	2	2	0	154	132	+22	4
6	Andorra	2	1	1	174	120	+54	3
7	Gibraltar	2	0	2	89	165	−76	2

Source: FIBA Archive

14 July 2001

Boxscore

Gibraltar	33–98	Andorra

15 July 2001

Boxscore

Gibraltar	56–67	Malta

== Playoffs ==
Semifinals
A2	Luxembourg	74
B1	Scotland	78
B2	Albania	48
A1	Cyprus	80

Final
B1	Scotland	74
A1	Cyprus	76
3rd place match
A2	Luxembourg	74
B2	Albania	69

=== Semifinals ===
14 July 2001

Boxscore

Luxembourg	74–78	Scotland

14 July 2001

Boxscore

Albania	48–80	Cyprus

=== 3rd place match ===
15 July 2001

Boxscore

Luxembourg	74–69	Albania

=== Final ===
15 July 2001

Boxscore

Scotland	74–76	Cyprus

== Final standings ==
Rank	Team
1st place, gold medalist(s)	Cyprus
2nd place, silver medalist(s)	Scotland
3rd place, bronze medalist(s)	Luxembourg
4	Albania
5	Malta
6	Andorra
7	Gibraltar
