= Azerbaijan men's national under-18 basketball team =

Basketball team

Azerbaijan
- FIBA zone: FIBA Europe
- National federation: Azerbaijan Basketball Federation

U19 World Cup
- Appearances: None

U18 EuroBasket
- Appearances: None

U18 EuroBasket Division B
- Appearances: 4
- Medals: None

U18 EuroBasket Division C
- Appearances: 6
- Medals: Gold: 2 (2016, 2024); Silver: 1 (2015); Bronze: 1 (2022)

The Azerbaijan men's national under-18 basketball team is a national basketball team of Azerbaijan, administered by the Azerbaijan Basketball Federation. It represents the country in international under-18 men's basketball competitions.

== FIBA U18 EuroBasket participations ==
Year	Division B	Division C
2007		8th
2015		2nd place, silver medalist(s)
2016		1st place, gold medalist(s)
2017	22nd	
2018	20th	
2022		3rd place, bronze medalist(s)
2023		5th
2024		1st place, gold medalist(s)
2025	21st	
2026	16th	

== See also ==
- Azerbaijan men's national basketball team
- Azerbaijan men's national under-16 basketball team
- Azerbaijan women's national under-18 basketball team
