= 2003 European Promotion Cup for Junior Men =

Tournament details
- Host country: Malta
- Dates: 26–30 August 2003
- Teams: 5 (from 1 confederation)

Final positions
- Champions: Albania (1st title)
- Runners-up: Scotland
- Third place: Andorra

The 2003 European Promotion Cup for Junior Men was the fourth edition of the basketball European Promotion Cup for Junior Men, today known as the FIBA U18 European Championship Division C. It was played in Malta from 26 to 30 August 2003. Albania men's national under-18 basketball team won the tournament.

== Participating teams ==
- Albania
- Andorra
- Gibraltar
- Malta
- Scotland

== Final standings ==
Pos	Team	Pld	W	L	PF	PA	PD	Pts
1	Albania	4	4	0	389	243	+146	8
2	Scotland	4	3	1	312	272	+40	7
3	Andorra	4	2	2	368	259	+109	6
4	Malta	4	1	3	301	287	+14	5
5	Gibraltar	4	0	4	141	450	−309	4

Source: FIBA Archive

== Results ==
26 August 2003

Boxscore

Gibraltar	32–113	Malta

26 August 2003

Boxscore

Andorra	69–72	Scotland

27 August 2003

Boxscore

Scotland	62–90	Albania

27 August 2003

Boxscore

Malta	57–99	Andorra

28 August 2003

Boxscore

Albania	98–86	Andorra

28 August 2003

Boxscore

Scotland	103–43	Gibraltar

29 August 2003

Boxscore

Andorra	114–32	Gibraltar

29 August 2003

Boxscore

Albania	81–61	Malta

30 August 2003

Boxscore

Malta	70–75	Scotland

30 August 2003

Boxscore

Gibraltar	34–120	Albania
