= 2015 FIBA Europe Under-18 Championship Division C =

Under-18 basketball tournament

Tournament details
- Host country: Gibraltar
- Dates: 14–19 July 2015
- Teams: 6 (from 1 confederation)
- Venue: 1 (in 1 host city)

Final positions
- Champions: Andorra (2nd title)
- Runners-up: Azerbaijan
- Third place: Wales

Official website
- www.fibaeurope.com

The 2015 FIBA Europe Under-18 Championship Division C was the 11th edition of the Division C of the FIBA U18 European Championship, the third tier of the European under-18 basketball championship. It was played in Gibraltar, from 14 to 19 July 2015. Andorra men's national under-18 basketball team won the tournament.

== Participating teams ==
- Andorra
- Azerbaijan
- Gibraltar
- Malta
- San Marino
- Wales

== First round ==
=== Group A ===
Pos	Team	Pld	W	L	PF	PA	PD	Pts	Qualification
1	Azerbaijan	2	2	0	148	129	+19	4	Semifinals
2	Andorra	2	1	1	130	124	+6	3	Quarterfinals
3	Wales	2	0	2	137	162	−25	2	Quarterfinals

Source: FIBA Archive

14 July 2015

Boxscore

Azerbaijan	61–55	Andorra

Tercentenary Sports Hall

15 July 2015

Boxscore

Andorra	75–63	Wales

Tercentenary Sports Hall

16 July 2015

Boxscore

Wales	74–87	Azerbaijan

Tercentenary Sports Hall

=== Group B ===
Pos	Team	Pld	W	L	PF	PA	PD	Pts	Qualification
1	Malta	2	1	1	120	90	+30	3	Semifinals
2	San Marino	2	1	1	116	123	−7	3	Quarterfinals
3	Gibraltar	2	1	1	101	124	−23	3	Quarterfinals

Source: FIBA Archive

14 July 2015

Boxscore

Malta	48–50	Gibraltar

Tercentenary Sports Hall

15 July 2015

Boxscore

Gibraltar	51–76	San Marino

Tercentenary Sports Hall

16 July 2015

Boxscore

San Marino	40–72	Malta

Tercentenary Sports Hall

== Playoffs ==
Quarterfinals
B2	San Marino	63
A3	Wales	74
A2	Andorra	86
B3	Gibraltar	48

Semifinals
A1	Azerbaijan	72
A3	Wales	61
B1	Malta	52
A2	Andorra	80
5th place match
B3	Gibraltar	59
B2	San Marino	62

Final
A1	Azerbaijan	66
A2	Andorra	80
3rd place match
A3	Wales	82
B1	Malta	64

=== Quarterfinals ===
17 July 2015

Boxscore

Andorra	86–48	Gibraltar

Tercentenary Sports Hall

17 July 2015

Boxscore

San Marino	63–74	Wales

Tercentenary Sports Hall

=== Semifinals ===
18 July 2015

Boxscore

Azerbaijan	72–61	Wales

Tercentenary Sports Hall

18 July 2015

Boxscore

Malta	52–80	Andorra

Tercentenary Sports Hall

=== 5th place match ===
19 July 2015

Boxscore

Gibraltar	59–62	San Marino

Tercentenary Sports Hall

=== 3rd place match ===
19 July 2015

Boxscore

Wales	82–64	Malta

Tercentenary Sports Hall

=== Final ===
19 July 2015

Boxscore

Azerbaijan	66–80	Andorra

Tercentenary Sports Hall

== Final standings ==
Rank	Team
1st place, gold medalist(s)	Andorra
2nd place, silver medalist(s)	Azerbaijan
3rd place, bronze medalist(s)	Wales
4	Malta
5	San Marino
6	Gibraltar
