= 2011 FIBA Europe Under-18 Championship Division C =

Tournament details
- Host country: San Marino
- City: Serravalle
- Dates: 19–23 July 2011
- Teams: 5 (from 1 confederation)
- Venue(s): 1 (in 1 host city)

Final positions
- Champions: Wales (1st title)
- Runners-up: San Marino
- Third place: Moldova

Official website
- www.fibaeurope.com

The 2011 FIBA Europe Under-18 Championship Division C was the eighth edition of the Division C of the FIBA U18 European Championship, the third tier of the European under-18 basketball championship. It was played in Serravalle, San Marino, from 19 to 23 July 2011. Wales men's national under-18 basketball team won the tournament.

== Participating teams ==
- Andorra
- Gibraltar
- Moldova
- San Marino
- Wales

== Final standings ==
Pos	Team	Pld	W	L	PF	PA	PD	Pts
1	Wales	4	4	0	298	223	+75	8
2	San Marino	4	3	1	276	228	+48	7
3	Moldova	4	2	2	281	237	+44	6
4	Andorra	4	1	3	287	256	+31	5
5	Gibraltar	4	0	4	139	337	−198	4

Source: FIBA Archive

== Results ==
19 July 2011

Boxscore

Gibraltar	29–95	Wales

Arena of WTC San Marino

19 July 2011

Boxscore

San Marino	69–62	Moldova

Arena of WTC San Marino

20 July 2011

Boxscore

Andorra	65–75	San Marino

Arena of WTC San Marino

20 July 2011

Boxscore

Moldova	73–31	Gibraltar

Arena of WTC San Marino

21 July 2011

Boxscore

Wales	74–72	Moldova

Arena of WTC San Marino

21 July 2011

Boxscore

Gibraltar	43–97	Andorra

Arena of WTC San Marino

22 July 2011

Boxscore

San Marino	72–36	Gibraltar

Arena of WTC San Marino

22 July 2011

Boxscore

Andorra	62–64	Wales

Arena of WTC San Marino

23 July 2011

Boxscore

Moldova	74–63	Andorra

Arena of WTC San Marino

23 July 2011

Boxscore

Wales	65–60	San Marino

Arena of WTC San Marino
