= 1997 European Promotion Cup for Junior Men =

Tournament details
- Host country: Andorra
- City: Andorra la Vella
- Dates: 8–12 July 1997
- Teams: 8 (from 1 confederation)

Final positions
- Champions: Moldova (1st title)
- Runners-up: Andorra
- Third place: Cyprus

Official website
- www.fibaeurope.com

The 1997 European Promotion Cup for Junior Men was the first edition of the basketball European Promotion Cup for Junior Men, today known as the FIBA U18 European Championship Division C. It was played in Andorra la Vella, Andorra, from 8 to 12 July 1997. Moldova men's national under-18 basketball team won the tournament.

== Participating teams ==
- Andorra
- Cyprus
- Gibraltar
- Ireland
- Luxembourg
- Malta
- Moldova
- San Marino

== First round ==
In the first round, the teams were drawn into two groups of four. The first two teams from each group advance to the semifinals, the other teams will play in the 5th–8th place playoffs.

=== Group A ===
Pos	Team	Pld	W	L	PF	PA	PD	Pts	Qualification
1	Cyprus	3	3	0	277	168	+109	6	Semifinals
2	San Marino	3	2	1	205	217	−12	5	Semifinals
3	Luxembourg	3	1	2	235	196	+39	4	5th–8th place playoffs
4	Gibraltar	3	0	3	159	295	−136	3	5th–8th place playoffs

Source: FIBA Archive

8 July 1997

Boxscore

San Marino	52–88	Cyprus

8 July 1997

Boxscore

Gibraltar	48–101	Luxembourg

9 July 1997

Boxscore

Luxembourg	67–69	San Marino

9 July 1997

Boxscore

Cyprus	110–49	Gibraltar

10 July 1997

Boxscore

Cyprus	79–67	Luxembourg

10 July 1997

Boxscore

Gibraltar	62–84	San Marino

=== Group B ===
Pos	Team	Pld	W	L	PF	PA	PD	Pts	Qualification
1	Moldova	3	2	1	262	187	+75	5 (Note: Head-to-head points: Moldova 3, Andorra 3, Ireland 3. Head-to-head PD: Moldova +24, Andorra +2, Ireland -26.)	Semifinals
2	Andorra	3	2	1	237	219	+18	5	Semifinals
3	Ireland	3	2	1	279	234	+45	5	5th–8th place playoffs
4	Malta	3	0	3	157	295	−138	3	5th–8th place playoffs

Source: FIBA Archive
Notes:

8 July 1997

Boxscore

Malta	54–125	Ireland

8 July 1997

Boxscore

Andorra	77–72	Moldova

9 July 1997

Boxscore

Moldova	97–46	Malta

9 July 1997

Boxscore

Ireland	90–87	Andorra

10 July 1997

Boxscore

Ireland	64–93	Moldova

10 July 1997

Boxscore

Andorra	73–57	Malta

== 5th–8th place playoffs ==
5th–8th place semifinals
A4	Gibraltar	48
B3	Ireland	118
B4	Malta	48
A3	Luxembourg	96

5th place match
B3	Ireland	84
A3	Luxembourg	69
7th place match
A4	Gibraltar	61
B4	Malta	78

=== 5th–8th place semifinals ===
11 July 1997

Boxscore

Gibraltar	48–118	Ireland

11 July 1997

Boxscore

Malta	48–96	Luxembourg

=== 7th place match ===
12 July 1997

Boxscore

Gibraltar	61–78	Malta

=== 5th place match ===
12 July 1997

Boxscore

Ireland	84–69	Luxembourg

== Championship playoffs ==
Semifinals
A2	San Marino	84
B1	Moldova	93
B2	Andorra	76
A1	Cyprus	73

Final
B1	Moldova	85
B2	Andorra	78
3rd place match
A2	San Marino	81
A1	Cyprus	114

=== Semifinals ===
11 July 1997

Boxscore

San Marino	84–93	Moldova

11 July 1997

Boxscore

Andorra	76–73	Cyprus

=== 3rd place match ===
12 July 1997

Boxscore

San Marino	81–114	Cyprus

=== Final ===
12 July 1997

Boxscore

Moldova	85–78	Andorra

== Final standings ==
Rank	Team
1st place, gold medalist(s)	Moldova
2nd place, silver medalist(s)	Andorra
3rd place, bronze medalist(s)	Cyprus
4	San Marino
5	Ireland
6	Luxembourg
7	Malta
8	Gibraltar
