= Moldova men's national under-18 basketball team =

Moldova
- FIBA zone: FIBA Europe
- National federation: Basketball Federation of Moldova

U19 World Cup
- Appearances: None

U18 EuroBasket
- Appearances: None

U18 EuroBasket Division B
- Appearances: 1
- Medals: None

U18 EuroBasket Division C
- Appearances: 14
- Medals: Gold: 1 (1997); Silver: 1 (2013); Bronze: 3 (2007, 2011, 2023)

The Moldova men's national under-18 basketball team is a national basketball team of Moldova, administered by the Basketball Federation of Moldova. It represents the country in international under-18 men's basketball competitions.

The team won five medals at the FIBA U18 EuroBasket Division C.

== FIBA U18 EuroBasket participations ==
Year	Division B	Division C
1997		1st place, gold medalist(s)
2006	17th	
2007		3rd place, bronze medalist(s)
2009		4th
2011		3rd place, bronze medalist(s)
2013		2nd place, silver medalist(s)
2016		8th
2017		4th

Year	Division B	Division C
2018		5th
2019		9th
2022		7th
2023		3rd place, bronze medalist(s)
2024		6th
2025		6th
2026		6th

== See also ==
- Moldova men's national basketball team
- Moldova men's national under-16 basketball team
- Moldova women's national under-18 basketball team
