= Malta men's national under-18 basketball team =

National sports team

Malta
- FIBA zone: FIBA Europe
- National federation: Malta Basketball Association

U19 World Cup
- Appearances: None

U18 EuroBasket
- Appearances: None

U18 EuroBasket Division B
- Appearances: None

U18 EuroBasket Division C
- Appearances: 17
- Medals: Gold: 1 (2009); Bronze: 1 (2017)

The Malta men's national under-18 basketball team is a national basketball team of Malta, administered by the Malta Basketball Association. It represents the country in international under-18 men's basketball competitions.

The team won two medals at the FIBA U18 EuroBasket Division C.

== FIBA U18 EuroBasket participations ==
Year	Result in Division C
1997	7th
1999	6th
2001	5th
2003	4th
2005	6th
2007	7th
2009	1st place, gold medalist(s)
2014	5th
2015	4th

Year	Result in Division C
2016	7th
2017	3rd place, bronze medalist(s)
2018	9th
2019	7th
2022	6th
2023	8th
2025	9th
2026	4th

== See also ==
- Malta men's national basketball team
- Malta men's national under-16 basketball team
- Malta women's national under-18 basketball team
