= 2018 FIBA U18 European Championship Division C =

Tournament details
- Host country: Kosovo
- City: Pristina
- Dates: 22–29 July 2018
- Teams: 9 (from 1 confederation)
- Venue: 1 (in 1 host city)

Final positions
- Champions: Kosovo (1st title)
- Runners-up: Cyprus
- Third place: Ireland

Official website
- www.fiba.basketball

The 2018 FIBA U18 European Championship Division C was the 14th edition of the Division C of the FIBA U18 European basketball championship. It was played in Pristina, Kosovo, from 22 to 29 July 2018. Nine teams participated in the competition. The host team, Kosovo, won the tournament.

== Participating teams ==
- Armenia
- Cyprus
- Gibraltar
- Ireland ▼ (24th place, 2017 FIBA U18 European Championship Division B)
- Kosovo
- Malta
- Moldova
- Monaco
- San Marino

== First round ==
=== Group A ===
Pos	Team	Pld	W	L	PF	PA	PD	Pts	Qualification
1	Ireland	4	4	0	347	274	+73	8	Semifinals
2	Monaco	4	3	1	337	233	+104	7	Semifinals
3	Moldova	4	2	2	307	332	−25	6	5th–9th place classification
4	Armenia	4	1	3	259	327	−68	5	5th–9th place classification
5	Malta	4	0	4	258	342	−84	4	5th–9th place classification

Source: FIBA

22 July 2018

Boxscore

Armenia	46–79	Monaco

Pallati i Rinisë dhe Sporteve

22 July 2018

Boxscore

Malta	69–84	Ireland

Pallati i Rinisë dhe Sporteve

23 July 2018

Boxscore

Moldova	89–78	Malta

Pallati i Rinisë dhe Sporteve

23 July 2018

Boxscore

Ireland	96–64	Armenia

Pallati i Rinisë dhe Sporteve

24 July 2018

Boxscore

Monaco	71–80	Ireland

Pallati i Rinisë dhe Sporteve

24 July 2018

Boxscore

Armenia	72–86	Moldova

Pallati i Rinisë dhe Sporteve

25 July 2018

Boxscore

Moldova	62–95	Monaco

Pallati i Rinisë dhe Sporteve

25 July 2018

Boxscore

Malta	66–77	Armenia

Pallati i Rinisë dhe Sporteve

26 July 2018

Boxscore

Ireland	87–70	Moldova

Pallati i Rinisë dhe Sporteve

26 July 2018

Boxscore

Monaco	92–45	Malta

Pallati i Rinisë dhe Sporteve

=== Group B ===
Pos	Team	Pld	W	L	PF	PA	PD	Pts	Qualification
1	Cyprus	3	3	0	250	152	+98	6	Semifinals
2	Kosovo	3	2	1	229	167	+62	5	Semifinals
3	San Marino	3	1	2	161	245	−84	4	5th–9th place classification
4	Gibraltar	3	0	3	154	230	−76	3	5th–9th place classification

Source: FIBA

22 July 2018

Boxscore

Cyprus	85–52	Gibraltar

Pallati i Rinisë dhe Sporteve

22 July 2018

Boxscore

San Marino	56–89	Kosovo

Pallati i Rinisë dhe Sporteve

24 July 2018

Boxscore

Gibraltar	55–68	San Marino

Pallati i Rinisë dhe Sporteve

24 July 2018

Boxscore

Kosovo	63–64	Cyprus

Pallati i Rinisë dhe Sporteve

26 July 2018

Boxscore

Cyprus	101–37	San Marino

Pallati i Rinisë dhe Sporteve

26 July 2018

Boxscore

Kosovo	77–47	Gibraltar

Pallati i Rinisë dhe Sporteve

== 5th–9th place classification ==
Pos	Team	Pld	W	L	PF	PA	PD	Pts
5	Moldova	4	4	0	366	277	+89	8
6	San Marino	4	3	1	282	254	+28	7
7	Gibraltar	4	2	2	270	308	−38	6
8	Armenia	4	1	3	271	285	−14	5
9	Malta	4	0	4	270	335	−65	4

Source: FIBA

27 July 2018

Boxscore

San Marino	77–49	Malta

Pallati i Rinisë dhe Sporteve

27 July 2018

Boxscore

Gibraltar	66–64	Armenia

Pallati i Rinisë dhe Sporteve

28 July 2018

Boxscore

Armenia	58–67	San Marino

Pallati i Rinisë dhe Sporteve

28 July 2018

Boxscore

Moldova	99–57	Gibraltar

Pallati i Rinisë dhe Sporteve

29 July 2018

Boxscore

San Marino	70–92	Moldova

Pallati i Rinisë dhe Sporteve

29 July 2018

Boxscore

Gibraltar	92–77	Malta

Pallati i Rinisë dhe Sporteve

== Championship playoffs ==
Semifinals
A1	Ireland	55
B2	Kosovo	69
B1	Cyprus	76
A2	Monaco	64

Final
B2	Kosovo	73
B1	Cyprus	64
3rd place match
A1	Ireland	93
A2	Monaco	91

=== Semifinals ===
28 July 2018

Boxscore

Ireland	55–69	Kosovo

Pallati i Rinisë dhe Sporteve

28 July 2018

Boxscore

Cyprus	76–64	Monaco

Pallati i Rinisë dhe Sporteve

=== 3rd place match ===
29 July 2018

Boxscore

Ireland	93–91	Monaco

Pallati i Rinisë dhe Sporteve

=== Final ===
29 July 2018

Boxscore

Kosovo	73–64	Cyprus

Pallati i Rinisë dhe Sporteve

== Final standings ==
Rank	Team
1st place, gold medalist(s)	Kosovo
2nd place, silver medalist(s)	Cyprus
3rd place, bronze medalist(s)	Ireland
4	Monaco
5	Moldova
6	San Marino
7	Gibraltar
8	Armenia
9	Malta

Promoted to the 2019 FIBA U18 European Championship Division B
