= 2017 FIBA U18 European Championship Division C =

Tournament details
- Host country: Cyprus
- City: Nicosia
- Dates: 4–9 July 2017
- Teams: 8 (from 1 confederation)
- Venue(s): 1 (in 1 host city)

Final positions
- Champions: Norway (1st title)
- Runners-up: Cyprus
- Third place: Malta

Official website
- www.fiba.basketball

The 2017 FIBA U18 European Championship Division C was the 13th edition of the Division C of the FIBA U18 European Championship, the third tier of the European under-18 basketball championship. It was played in Nicosia, Cyprus, from 4 to 9 July 2017. Eight teams participated in the competition. Norway men's national under-18 basketball team won the tournament.

== Participating teams ==
- Armenia
- Cyprus ▼ (24th place, 2016 FIBA U18 European Championship Division B)
- Gibraltar
- Kosovo
- Malta
- Moldova
- Norway
- San Marino

== First round ==
=== Group A ===
Pos	Team	Pld	W	L	PF	PA	PD	Pts	Qualification
1	Norway	3	3	0	227	171	+56	6	Semifinals
2	Cyprus	3	2	1	215	176	+39	5	Semifinals
3	Kosovo	3	1	2	197	217	−20	4	5th–8th place playoffs
4	Armenia	3	0	3	153	228	−75	3	5th–8th place playoffs

Source: FIBA

4 July 2017

Boxscore

Armenia	47–80	Cyprus

Eleftheria Indoor Hall

4 July 2017

Boxscore

Norway	82–65	Kosovo

Eleftheria Indoor Hall

5 July 2017

Boxscore

Kosovo	72–54	Armenia

Eleftheria Indoor Hall

5 July 2017

Boxscore

Cyprus	54–69	Norway

Eleftheria Indoor Hall

6 July 2017

Boxscore

Norway	76–52	Armenia

Eleftheria Indoor Hall

6 July 2017

Boxscore

Cyprus	81–60	Kosovo

Eleftheria Indoor Hall

=== Group B ===
Pos	Team	Pld	W	L	PF	PA	PD	Pts	Qualification
1	Malta	3	3	0	232	196	+36	6	Semifinals
2	Moldova	3	2	1	251	238	+13	5	Semifinals
3	San Marino	3	1	2	215	219	−4	4	5th–8th place playoffs
4	Gibraltar	3	0	3	203	248	−45	3	5th–8th place playoffs

Source: FIBA

4 July 2017

Boxscore

San Marino	61–74	Malta

Eleftheria Indoor Hall

4 July 2017

Boxscore

Gibraltar	84–90	Moldova

Eleftheria Indoor Hall

5 July 2017

Boxscore

Moldova	92–78	San Marino

Eleftheria Indoor Hall

5 July 2017

Boxscore

Malta	82–66	Gibraltar

Eleftheria Indoor Hall

6 July 2017

Boxscore

San Marino	76–53	Gibraltar

Eleftheria Indoor Hall

6 July 2017

Boxscore

Moldova	69–76	Malta

Eleftheria Indoor Hall

== 5th–8th place playoffs ==
5th–8th place semifinals
A3	Kosovo	100
B4	Gibraltar	53
B3	San Marino	53
A4	Armenia	63

5th place match
A3	Kosovo	74
A4	Armenia	52
7th place match
B4	Gibraltar	59
B3	San Marino	74

=== 5th–8th place semifinals ===
8 July 2017

Boxscore

Kosovo	100–53	Gibraltar

Eleftheria Indoor Hall

8 July 2017

Boxscore

San Marino	53–63	Armenia

Eleftheria Indoor Hall

=== 7th place match ===
9 July 2017

Boxscore

Gibraltar	59–74	San Marino

Eleftheria Indoor Hall

=== 5th place match ===
9 July 2017

Boxscore

Kosovo	74–52	Armenia

Eleftheria Indoor Hall

== Championship playoffs ==
Semifinals
A1	Norway	108
B2	Moldova	49
B1	Malta	64
A2	Cyprus	67

Final
A1	Norway	84
A2	Cyprus	53
3rd place match
B2	Moldova	61
B1	Malta	68

=== Semifinals ===
8 July 2017

Boxscore

Malta	64–67	Cyprus

Eleftheria Indoor Hall

8 July 2017

Boxscore

Norway	108–49	Moldova

Eleftheria Indoor Hall

=== 3rd place match ===
9 July 2017

Boxscore

Moldova	61–68	Malta

Eleftheria Indoor Hall

=== Final ===
9 July 2017

Boxscore

Norway	84–53	Cyprus

Eleftheria Indoor Hall

== Final standings ==
Rank	Team
1st place, gold medalist(s)	Norway
2nd place, silver medalist(s)	Cyprus
3rd place, bronze medalist(s)	Malta
4	Moldova
5	Kosovo
6	Armenia
7	San Marino
8	Gibraltar

Promoted to the 2018 FIBA U18 European Championship Division B
