= Luxembourg men's national under-18 basketball team =

Youth national basketball team of Luxembourg

Luxembourg
- FIBA zone: FIBA Europe
- National federation: Luxembourg Basketball Federation

U19 World Cup
- Appearances: None

U18 EuroBasket
- Appearances: None

U18 EuroBasket Division B
- Appearances: 13
- Medals: None

U18 EuroBasket Division C
- Appearances: 8
- Medals: Silver: 2 (2024, 2025); Bronze: 3 (1999, 2001, 2005)
Home	Away

The Luxembourg men's national under-18 basketball team is a national basketball team of Luxembourg, administered by the Luxembourg Basketball Federation. It represents the country in under-18 men's international basketball competitions.

Luxembourg has attained moderate results at the Division B level, although they have achieved success at the Division C level having won two silver and three bronze medals.

== FIBA U18 EuroBasket participations ==
Year	Division B	Division C
1997		6th
1999		3rd place, bronze medalist(s)
2001		3rd place, bronze medalist(s)
2005	11th	
2005		3rd place, bronze medalist(s)
2006	16th	
2007	15th	
2010	16th	
2011	17th	
2012	19th	
2013	19th	

Year	Division B	Division C
2014	11th	
2015	24th	
2016	19th	
2017	23rd	
2018	19th	
2019	24th	
2022		4th
2023		4th
2024		2nd place, silver medalist(s)
2025		2nd place, silver medalist(s)

== See also ==
- Luxembourg men's national basketball team
- Luxembourg men's national under-16 basketball team
- Luxembourg women's national under-18 basketball team
