= Gibraltar men's national under-18 basketball team =

Gibraltar
- FIBA zone: FIBA Europe
- National federation: Gibraltar Amateur Basketball Association

U19 World Cup
- Appearances: None

U18 EuroBasket
- Appearances: None

U18 EuroBasket Division B
- Appearances: None

U18 EuroBasket Division C
- Appearances: 20
- Medals: Silver: 2 (2009, 2014)

The Gibraltar men's national under-18 basketball team is a national basketball team of Gibraltar, administered by the Gibraltar Amateur Basketball Association. It represents the country in international under-18 men's basketball competitions.

Gibraltar is the only team to have participated in all 20 editions of the FIBA U18 EuroBasket Division C. The team won two silver medals there.

== FIBA U18 EuroBasket participations ==
Year	Result in Division C
1997	8th
1999	8th
2001	7th
2003	5th
2005	8th
2007	6th
2009	2nd place, silver medalist(s)
2011	5th
2013	5th
2014	2nd place, silver medalist(s)

Year	Result in Division C
2015	6th
2016	9th
2017	8th
2018	7th
2019	5th
2022	10th
2023	9th
2024	7th
2025	10th
2026	7th

== See also ==
- Gibraltar men's national basketball team
- Gibraltar men's national under-16 basketball team
- Gibraltar women's national under-18 basketball team
