= Albania men's national under-18 basketball team =

Albanian youth national basketball team

Albania
- FIBA zone: FIBA Europe
- National federation: Albanian Basketball Federation

U19 World Cup
- Appearances: None

U18 EuroBasket
- Appearances: None

U18 EuroBasket Division B
- Appearances: 5
- Medals: None

U18 EuroBasket Division C
- Appearances: 8
- Medals: Gold: 2 (2003, 2022); Bronze: 3 (2019, 2024, 2026)

The Albania men's national under-18 basketball team is a national basketball team of Albania, administered by the Albanian Basketball Federation (FSHB) (Albanian: Federata Shqiptare e Basketbollit). It represents the country in international under-18 men's basketball competitions.

The team won five medals at the FIBA U18 EuroBasket Division C.

== FIBA U18 EuroBasket participations ==
Year	Division B	Division C
1999		7th
2001		4th
2003		1st place, gold medalist(s)
2015	23rd	
2016	21st	
2017	21st	
2018	24th	

Year	Division B	Division C
2019		3rd place, bronze medalist(s)
2022		1st place, gold medalist(s)
2023	22nd	
2024		3rd place, bronze medalist(s)
2025		5th
2026		3rd place, bronze medalist(s)

== See also ==
- Albania men's national basketball team
- Albania men's national under-16 basketball team
- Albania women's national under-18 basketball team
