= 2024 FIBA U18 EuroBasket Division C =

International basketball competition

Tournament details
- Host country: Albania
- City: Elbasan
- Dates: 23–28 July 2024
- Teams: 7 (from 1 confederation)
- Venue: 1 (in 1 host city)

Final positions
- Champions: Azerbaijan (2nd title)
- Runners-up: Luxembourg
- Third place: Albania
- Fourth place: Armenia

Tournament statistics
- Games played: 15
- Attendance: 1,030 (69 per game)
- MVP: (Azerbaijan) Derin Berkoz
- Top scorer: (Moldova) Vladimir Cebotari (22.5 points per game)

Official website
- www.fiba.basketball

The 2024 FIBA U18 EuroBasket Division C was the 18th edition of the Division C of the European basketball championship for men's under-18 national teams. The tournament was played in Elbasan, Albania, from 23 to 28 July 2024.

== Participating teams ==
- Albania ▼ (22nd place, 2023 FIBA U18 European Championship Division B)
- Armenia
- Azerbaijan
- Gibraltar
- Luxembourg
- Moldova
- San Marino

== First round ==
The draw of the first round was held on 6 February 2024 in Freising, Germany.

In the first round, the teams were drawn into two groups. The first two teams from each group advance to the semifinals; the other teams will play in the 5th–7th place classification group.

All times are local (Central European Summer Time – UTC+2).

=== Group A ===
Pos	Team	Pld	W	L	PF	PA	PD	Pts	Qualification
1	Luxembourg	3	3	0	261	193	+68	6	Semifinals
2	Albania	3	2	1	234	199	+35	5	Semifinals
3	San Marino	3	1	2	222	204	+18	4	5th–7th place classification
4	Gibraltar	3	0	3	123	244	−121	3	5th–7th place classification

Source: FIBA

23 July 2024
18:30

Boxscore

Luxembourg	84–82	Albania
Scoring by quarter: 19–14, 24–18, 29–24, 12–26
Pts: Gräwert 26; Rebs: Oth 12; Asts: Stoffel 7		Pts: Bello 25; Rebs: Hida 15; Asts: Spahiu, Bello 3

Tomorr Sinani Sports Palace
Attendance: 200
Referees: Dumitru Stasiev (MDA), Peter Zenis (SVK), Davit Kikhyan (ARM)

23 July 2024
21:00

Boxscore

Gibraltar	43–76	San Marino
Scoring by quarter: 4–27, 14–15, 13–19, 12–15
Pts: Dalmedo 9 Rebs: Dalmedo 15; Asts: Cassaglia 5		Pts: Valmaggi 17; Rebs: Zavoli 9 Asts: Rossini 5

Tomorr Sinani Sports Palace
Attendance: 30
Referees: Lukasz Jankowski (POL), Edison Gjoni (ALB), Urfan Bayramli (AZE)

24 July 2024
18:30

Boxscore

Albania	70–42	Gibraltar
Scoring by quarter: 23–11, 21–13, 12–12, 14–6
Pts: Sinani 18; Rebs: Rushaj 12; Asts: Hida 5		Pts: Dalmedo 15; Rebs: Dalmedo 14; Asts: McGlashan 5

Tomorr Sinani Sports Palace
Attendance: 100
Referees: Peter Zenis (SVK), Dumitru Stasiev (MDA), Urfan Bayramli (AZE)

24 July 2024
21:00

Boxscore

San Marino	73–79	Luxembourg
Scoring by quarter: 27–18, 20–30, 20–18, 6–13
Pts: Valmaggi 32; Rebs: Valmaggi 10; Asts: Valmaggi 4		Pts: Stoffel, Oth 17; Rebs: Oth 10; Asts: Stoffel 10

Tomorr Sinani Sports Palace
Attendance: 30
Referees: Lukasz Jankowski (POL), Hugo Blanco Marques Da Silva (POR), Davit Kikhyan (ARM)

25 July 2024
18:30

Boxscore

Albania	82–73	San Marino
Scoring by quarter: 26–13, 15–18, 26–18, 15–24
Pts: Hida 28; Rebs: Hida 27; Asts: Hida 5		Pts: Cadiman 29; Rebs: Cadiman 9 Asts: Rossini, Guidi 2

Tomorr Sinani Sports Palace
Attendance: 100
Referees: Peter Zenis (SVK), Hugo Blanco Marques Da Silva (POR), Davit Kikhyan (ARM)

25 July 2024
21:00

Boxscore

Gibraltar	38–98	Luxembourg
Scoring by quarter: 9–27, 1–21, 13–26, 15–24
Pts: Dalmedo 15; Rebs: Dalmedo 7 Asts: McGlashan 2		Pts: Hagen 19; Rebs: Oth 14; Asts: Hagen 6

Tomorr Sinani Sports Palace
Attendance: 30
Referees: Lukasz Jankowski (POL), Dumitru Stasiev (MDA), Urfan Bayramli (AZE)

=== Group B ===
Pos	Team	Pld	W	L	PF	PA	PD	Pts	Qualification
1	Azerbaijan	2	2	0	163	145	+18	4	Semifinals
2	Armenia	2	1	1	157	148	+9	3	Semifinals
3	Moldova	2	0	2	148	175	−27	2	5th–7th place classification

Source: FIBA

23 July 2024
16:00

Boxscore

Armenia	88–72	Moldova
Scoring by quarter: 19–17, 24–13, 28–21, 17–21
Pts: Gharabekyan 20; Rebs: Hatsakorzian 12; Asts: Three players 2		Pts: Cebotari 23; Rebs: Voitenco 12; Asts: Cusniriuc 8

Tomorr Sinani Sports Palace
Attendance: 30
Referees: Tolga Edis (TUR), Marc Mouton (LUX), Stefan Vukovic (MNE)

24 July 2024
16:00

Boxscore

Moldova	76–87	Azerbaijan
Scoring by quarter: 23–27, 15–28, 16–17, 22–15
Pts: Cusniriuc 31; Rebs: Voitenco 7 Asts: Cusniriuc, Radulov 3		Pts: Aghayev 24; Rebs: Aghayev 12; Asts: Mammadov 5

Tomorr Sinani Sports Palace
Attendance: 30
Referees: Tolga Edis (TUR), Stefan Vukovic (MNE), Edison Gjoni (ALB)

25 July 2024
16:00

Boxscore

Azerbaijan	76–69	Armenia
Scoring by quarter: 20–12, 25–23, 11–19, 20–15
Pts: Berkoz 18; Rebs: Aghayev 14; Asts: Berkoz 5		Pts: Hatsakorzian 19; Rebs: Hatsakorzian 12; Asts: Gazarian 7

Tomorr Sinani Sports Palace
Attendance: 40
Referees: Tolga Edis (TUR), Marc Mouton (LUX), Edison Gjoni (ALB)

== 5th–7th place classification ==
=== Group C ===
Pos	Team	Pld	W	L	PF	PA	PD	Pts
5	San Marino	2	2	0	166	125	+41	4
6	Moldova	2	1	1	165	161	+4	3
7	Gibraltar	2	0	2	114	159	−45	2

Source: FIBA

27 July 2024
16:00

Boxscore

Gibraltar	71–83	Moldova
Scoring by quarter: 15–22, 14–31, 17–21, 25–9
Pts: Dalmedo 22; Rebs: Dalmedo 24; Asts: Three players 3		Pts: Cebotari 26; Rebs: Adamco 17; Asts: Adamco 11

Tomorr Sinani Sports Palace
Attendance: 50
Referees: Marc Mouton (LUX), Urfan Bayramli (AZE), Davit Kikhyan (ARM)

28 July 2024
14:00

Boxscore

Moldova	82–90	San Marino
Scoring by quarter: 24–22, 23–27, 21–31, 14–10
Pts: Cebotari 24; Rebs: Voitenco 20; Asts: Cusniriuc 6		Pts: Cadiman 28; Rebs: Cadiman 11; Asts: Conforti, Botteghi 3

Tomorr Sinani Sports Palace
Attendance: 40
Referees: Peter Zenis (SVK), Marc Mouton (LUX), Urfan Bayramli (AZE)

== Championship playoffs ==
Semifinals
A1	Luxembourg (OT)	85
B2	Armenia	78
B1	Azerbaijan	62
A2	Albania	41

Final
Luxembourg	71
Azerbaijan	77
3rd place match
Armenia	53
Albania	79

=== Semifinals ===
27 July 2024
18:30

Boxscore

Azerbaijan	62–41	Albania
Scoring by quarter: 22–13, 10–10, 21–4, 9–14
Pts: Berkoz 18; Rebs: Garayev, Aghayev 8 Asts: Mammadov 5		Pts: Hida 12; Rebs: Hida 9 Asts: Deliallisi 3

Tomorr Sinani Sports Palace
Attendance: 130
Referees: Lukasz Jankowski (POL), Hugo Blanco Marques Da Silva (POR), Dumitru Stasiev (MDA)

27 July 2024
21:00

Boxscore

Luxembourg	85–78 (OT)	Armenia
Scoring by quarter: 17–20, 14–20, 18–13, 21–17, Overtime: 15–8
Pts: Oth 26; Rebs: Oth 19; Asts: Stoffel 5		Pts: Gazarian 21; Rebs: Karakhanyan 11; Asts: Gharabekyan, Karakhanyan 3

Tomorr Sinani Sports Palace
Attendance: 50
Referees: Tolga Edis (TUR), Stefan Vukovic (MNE), Peter Zenis (SVK)

=== 3rd place match ===
28 July 2024
16:30

Boxscore

Armenia	53–79	Albania
Scoring by quarter: 11–23, 19–17, 7–21, 16–18
Pts: Karakhanyan, Hatsakorzian 11; Rebs: Hatsakorzian 8 Asts: Three players 2		Pts: Sinani 22; Rebs: Hida 20; Asts: Hida 6

Tomorr Sinani Sports Palace
Attendance: 70
Referees: Tolga Edis (TUR), Dumitru Stasiev (MDA), Hugo Blanco Marques Da Silva (POR)

=== Final ===
28 July 2024
19:00

Boxscore

Luxembourg	71–77	Azerbaijan
Scoring by quarter: 9–18, 20–21, 24–18, 18–20
Pts: Stoffel 19; Rebs: Oth 9 Asts: Stoffel, Grawert 4		Pts: Babayev 19; Rebs: Garayev 8 Asts: Mammadov 5

Tomorr Sinani Sports Palace
Attendance: 100
Referees: Lukasz Jankowski (POL), Stefan Vukovic (MNE), Edison Gjoni (ALB)

== Final standings ==
Rank	Team	Record
1st place, gold medalist(s)	Azerbaijan	4–0
2nd place, silver medalist(s)	Luxembourg	4–1
3rd place, bronze medalist(s)	Albania	3–2
4	Armenia	1–3
5	San Marino	2–2
6	Moldova	1–3
7	Gibraltar	0–4

Promoted to the 2025 FIBA U18 EuroBasket Division B

== Statistics and awards ==
=== Statistical leaders ===
==== Players ====
Points

Name	PPG
(Moldova) Vladimir Cebotari	22.5
(San Marino) Matteo Valmaggi	19.8
(San Marino) Mathias Cadiman	19.5
(Luxembourg) Frederick Grawert	17.8
(Albania) Erigert Bello	17.3

Rebounds

Name	RPG
(Albania) Viktorio Hida	15.6
(Gibraltar) Louis Dalmedo	15.0
(Luxembourg) Konan Oth	12.8
(Moldova) Andrei Voitenco	11.3
(Armenia) Sebastian Hatsakorzian	10.3
(Azerbaijan) Rafael Aghayev	10.3

Assists

Name	APG
(Moldova) Nichita Cusniriuc	5.8
(Luxembourg) Philippe Stoffel	5.2
(Moldova) Nichita Adamco	4.8
(Azerbaijan) Alikamran Mammadov	4.3
(Albania) Viktorio Hida	3.6

Blocks

Name	BPG
(Armenia) Rafayel Masumyan	1.8
(Azerbaijan) Rafael Aghayev	1.5
(Moldova) Vladimir Cebotari	1.3
(Azerbaijan) Derin Berkoz	1.3
(Albania) Skendi Sinani	1.2

Steals

Name	SPG
(San Marino) Matteo Valmaggi	3.8
(San Marino) Tommaso Botteghi	3.5
(Moldova) Nichita Adamco	3.3
(Azerbaijan) Derin Berkoz	3.3
(Armenia) Hayk Karakhanyan	2.8
(Moldova) Andrei Voitenco	2.8

Efficiency

Name	EFFPG
(Albania) Viktorio Hida	26.0
(Azerbaijan) Rafael Aghayev	20.0
(Albania) Erigert Bello	18.7
(Moldova) Vladimir Cebotari	18.0
(Luxembourg) Konan Oth	18.0
(Albania) Skendi Sinani	18.0

==== Teams ====
Points

Team	PPG
Luxembourg	83.4
Moldova	78.3
San Marino	78.0
Azerbaijan	75.5
Armenia	72.0

Rebounds

Team	RPG
Albania	57.8
Luxembourg	53.2
San Marino	50.3
Moldova	50.0
Armenia	46.3

Assists

Team	APG
Luxembourg	18.8
Moldova	16.8
Azerbaijan	15.8
Albania	15.0
San Marino	13.8

Blocks

Team	BPG
Azerbaijan	5.0
Albania	4.0
Armenia	3.5
Moldova	3.0
San Marino	2.5

Steals

Team	SPG
San Marino	15.5
Moldova	13.0
Azerbaijan	12.3
Armenia	12.0
Gibraltar	10.5

Efficiency

Team	EFFPG
Luxembourg	88.6
Azerbaijan	81.5
Albania	80.6
San Marino	78.5
Moldova	73.0

=== Awards ===
The awards were announced on 28 July 2024.

Award	Player
All-Tournament Team	(Azerbaijan) Derin Berkoz
All-Tournament Team	(Albania) Viktorio Hida
All-Tournament Team	(Armenia) Sebastian Hatsakorzian
All-Tournament Team	(Luxembourg) Konan Oth
All-Tournament Team	(Luxembourg) Philippe Stoffel
Most Valuable Player	(Azerbaijan) Derin Berkoz
