= Norway men's national under-18 basketball team =

Youth basketball team representing Norway

Norway
- FIBA zone: FIBA Europe
- National federation: Norges Basketballforbund

U19 World Cup
- Appearances: None

U18 EuroBasket
- Appearances: 1
- Medals: None

U18 EuroBasket Division B
- Appearances: 15
- Medals: None

U18 EuroBasket Division C
- Appearances: 1
- Medals: Gold: 1 (2017)
Home	Away

The Norway men's national under-18 basketball team is a national basketball team of Norway, administered by the Norwegian Basketball Federation. It represents the country in international under-18 men's basketball competitions.

== FIBA U18 EuroBasket participations ==
Year	Division A	Division B	Division C
1982	12th		
2006		13th	
2007		11th	
2008		19th	
2009		17th	
2011		16th	
2012		20th	
2013		14th	
2014		10th	

Year	Division A	Division B	Division C
2017			1st place, gold medalist(s)
2018		13th	
2019		20th	
2022		18th	
2023		17th	
2024		10th	
2025		19th	
2026		20th	

== See also ==
- Norway men's national basketball team
- Norway men's national under-16 basketball team
- Norway women's national under-18 basketball team
