= Belgium men's national under-18 basketball team =

Belgium
- FIBA zone: FIBA Europe
- National federation: Basketball Belgium

U19 World Cup
- Appearances: None

U18 EuroBasket
- Appearances: 12
- Medals: None

U18 EuroBasket Division B
- Appearances: 15
- Medals: Gold: 1 (2007); Silver: 1 (2023); Bronze: 3 (2013, 2018, 2026)
Home	Away

The Belgium men's national under-18 basketball team is a national basketball team of Belgium, administered by the Basketball Belgium. It represents the country in international under-18 men's basketball competitions.

== FIBA U18 EuroBasket participations ==
Year	Division A	Division B
1970	12th	
1974	10th	
1976	10th	
1978	10th	
1980	11th	
1992	10th	
1996	4th	
2005	16th	
2006		8th
2007		1st place, gold medalist(s)
2008	15th	
2009		5th
2010		7th
2011		9th

Year	Division A	Division B
2012		8th
2013		3rd place, bronze medalist(s)
2014	15th	
2015		9th
2016		5th
2017		9th
2018		3rd place, bronze medalist(s)
2019		10th
2022		10th
2023		2nd place, silver medalist(s)
2024	7th	
2025	15th	
2026		3rd place, bronze medalist(s)

== See also ==
- Belgium men's national basketball team
- Belgium men's national under-16 basketball team
- Belgium women's national under-19 basketball team
