= FIBA U18 EuroBasket =

International junior men's basketball competition

- Most recent season or competition: 2026 FIBA U18 EuroBasket
- Sport: Basketball
- Founded: 1964
- Divisions: 3
- No. of teams: 16 (Division A)
- Continent: Europe (FIBA Europe)
- Most recent champion: Slovenia (1st title)
- Most titles: Serbia (Note: Including 6 titles of Yugoslavia and Serbia and Montenegro.) (11 titles)
- Related competitions: FIBA U20 EuroBasket; FIBA U16 EuroBasket
- Website: www.fiba.basketball/history

The FIBA U18 EuroBasket, formerly the FIBA U18 European Championship, and originally the FIBA European Championship for Juniors, is an annual youth basketball competition contested by under-18 men's national teams from FIBA Europe.

The inaugural tournament was in 1964, and was held biennially until 2002. Since 2004, the competition has been played every year. In even-numbered years, it also serves as the European qualification path for the FIBA Under-19 Basketball World Cup.

The current champions are Slovenia, having beaten Italy in the 2026 final.

== Division A ==
=== Results ===
Year	Host	Gold medal game			Bronze medal game		
Year	Host	Gold	Score	Silver	Bronze	Score	Fourth place
1964 details	Italy (Naples)	Soviet Union	62–41	France	Italy	73–72	Bulgaria
1966 details	Italy (Porto San Giorgio)	Soviet Union	71–50	Yugoslavia	Italy	47–42	Czechoslovakia
1968 details	Spain (Vigo)	Soviet Union	82–73	Yugoslavia	Italy	53–44	Turkey
1970 details	Greece (Athens)	Soviet Union	80–48	Greece	Italy	62–57	Yugoslavia
1972 details	Yugoslavia (Zadar)	Yugoslavia	89–65	Italy	Soviet Union	73–60	Israel
1974 details	France (Orléans)	Yugoslavia	80–79	Spain	Italy	77–69	Sweden
1976 details	Spain (Santiago de Compostela)	Yugoslavia	92–83	Soviet Union	Spain	89–72	Bulgaria
1978 details	Italy (Roseto degli Abruzzi & Teramo)	Soviet Union	104–100	Spain	Yugoslavia	95–72	Bulgaria
1980 details	Yugoslavia (Celje)	Soviet Union	83–81	Yugoslavia	Bulgaria	96–90	Spain
1982 details	Bulgaria (Dimitrovgrad & Haskovo)	Soviet Union	97–87	Yugoslavia	Bulgaria	84–73	Italy
1984 details	Sweden (Huskvarna & Katrineholm)	Soviet Union	75–74	Italy	Yugoslavia	92–89	Spain
1986 details	Austria (Vöcklabruck & Gmunden)	Yugoslavia	111–87	Soviet Union	Italy	83–53	West Germany
1988 details	Yugoslavia (Titov Vrbas & Srbobran)	Yugoslavia	84–75	Italy	Czechoslovakia	88–70	Greece
1990 details	Netherlands (Groningen & Emmen)	Italy	92–79	Soviet Union	Spain	105–73	Romania
1992 details	Hungary (Budapest, Zalaegerszeg & Szolnok)	France	94–83	Italy	CIS	113–108	Greece
1994 details	Israel (Tel Aviv)	Lithuania	73–71	Croatia	Spain	87–76	Italy
1996 details	France (Auch, Lourdes & Tarbes)	Croatia	64–51	France	FR Yugoslavia	77–61	Belgium
1998 details	Bulgaria (Varna)	Spain	81–70	Croatia	Greece	97–91	Latvia
2000 details	Croatia (Zadar)	France	65–64	Croatia	Greece	71–65	Italy
2002 details	Germany (Ludwigsburg, Esslingen & Böblingen)	Croatia	74–72	Slovenia	Greece	82–67	Lithuania
2004 details	Spain (Zaragoza)	Spain	89–71	Turkey	France	74–68	Italy
2005 details	SCG (Belgrade)	Serbia and Montenegro	78–61	Turkey	Italy	88–83	Spain
2006 details	Greece (Amaliada, Olympia & Argostoli)	France	77–72	Lithuania	Spain	92–83	Turkey
2007 details	Spain (Madrid)	Serbia	92–89	Greece	Latvia	74–72	Lithuania
2008 details	Greece (Amaliada & Pyrgos)	Greece	57–50	Lithuania	Croatia	73–68	France
2009 details	France (Metz)	Serbia	78–72	France	Turkey	95–74	Lithuania
2010 details	Lithuania (Vilnius)	Lithuania	90–61	Russia	Latvia	75–49	Serbia
2011 details	Poland (Wrocław)	Spain	71–65	Serbia	Turkey	69–65	Italy
2012 details	Lithuania (Vilnius); Latvia (Liepāja)	Croatia	88–76	Lithuania	Serbia	66–56	Russia
2013 details	Latvia (Liepāja, Riga & Ventspils)	Turkey	81–74	Croatia	Spain	57–56	Latvia
2014 details	Turkey (Konya)	Turkey	85–68	Serbia	Croatia	75–71	Greece
2015 details	Greece (Volos)	Greece	64–61	Turkey	Lithuania	74–49	Bosnia and Herzegovina
2016 details	Turkey (Samsun)	France	75–68	Lithuania	Italy	74–68	Germany
2017 details	Slovakia (Bratislava)	Serbia	74–62	Spain	Lithuania	97–88	Turkey
2018 details	Latvia (Liepāja, Riga & Ventspils)	Serbia	99–90	Latvia	France	79–70	Russia
2019 details	Greece (Volos)	Spain	57–53	Turkey	Slovenia	81–57	Greece
2020	Turkey	Cancelled due to COVID-19 pandemic in Turkey.					
2021	Turkey	Cancelled due to COVID-19 pandemic in Europe. The 2021 FIBA U18 European Challengers were played instead.					
2022 details	Turkey (İzmir)	Spain	68–61	Turkey	Serbia	70–67	Slovenia
2023 details	Serbia (Niš)	Serbia	81–71	Spain	Germany	67–59	France
2024 details	Finland (Tampere)	Germany	93–83	Serbia	Slovenia	84–70	Israel
2025 details	Serbia (Belgrade)	Spain	82–81	France	Italy	86–68	Latvia
2026 details	Italy (Trento & Rovereto)	Slovenia	88–71	Italy	France	74–69	Spain
2027 details	Portugal (Matosinhos)		–			–	
2028 details	Estonia (Tallinn)		–			–	

=== Medal table ===
- Defunct countries in italics.

Rank	Nation	Gold	Silver	Bronze	Total
1	Serbia (Note: Yugoslavia and Serbia and Montenegro won 6 gold, 4 silver and 3 bronze medals.)	11	7	5	23
2	Russia (Note: Soviet Union and CIS won 8 gold, 3 silver and 2 bronze medals.)	8	4	2	14
3	Spain	6	4	5	15
4	France	4	4	3	11
5	Croatia	3	4	2	9
6	Turkey	2	5	2	9
7	Lithuania	2	4	2	8
8	Greece	2	2	3	7
9	Italy	1	5	9	15
10	Slovenia	1	1	2	4
11	Germany	1	0	1	2
12	Latvia	0	1	2	3
13	Bulgaria	0	0	2	2
14	Czechoslovakia	0	0	1	1
Totals (14 entries)		41	41	41	123

=== Participation details ===
==== Tournaments 1964–1992 ====
Team	(Italy) 1964	(Italy) 1966	(Spain) 1968	(Greece) 1970	(Socialist Federal Republic of Yugoslavia) 1972	(France) 1974	(Spain) 1976	(Italy) 1978	(Socialist Federal Republic of Yugoslavia) 1980	(Bulgaria) 1982	(Sweden) 1984	(Austria) 1986	(Socialist Federal Republic of Yugoslavia) 1988	(Netherlands) 1990	(Hungary) 1992
Austria			12th			16th						12th			
Belgium				12th		10th	10th	10th	11th						10th
Bulgaria	4th	5th		7th	12th		4th	4th	3rd	3rd	10th				
CIS †	played as (Soviet Union)														3rd
Czechoslovakia	5th	4th	10th	8th	5th	9th		7th	8th	7th	6th	8th	3rd	11th	
Finland		8th	8th			15th	13th			8th	7th	7th	11th		8th
France	2nd	7th			6th	8th		9th	12th	10th		10th		7th	1st
West Germany			11th	10th		14th	11th		6th	5th	5th	4th	9th	12th	7th
Greece			6th	2nd	9th	7th	7th	6th			9th	6th	4th	8th	4th
Hungary					8th					11th		9th			11th
Israel			7th		4th	11th	8th		7th	9th			10th		5th
Italy	3rd	3rd	3rd	3rd	2nd	3rd	5th	5th	5th	4th	2nd	3rd	2nd	1st	2nd
Netherlands						12th						11th	12th	10th	
Norway										12th					
Poland	6th		9th	6th	10th	6th	6th	12th			11th			6th	9th
Portugal															
Romania															
Soviet Union †	1st	1st	1st	1st	3rd	5th	2nd	1st	1st	1st	1st	2nd	5th	2nd	†
Spain	8th	6th	5th	5th	7th	2nd	3rd	2nd	4th	6th	4th	5th	6th	3rd	6th
Sweden						4th	12th		10th		12th		8th		
Turkey			4th	11th	11th	13th	9th	8th	9th		8th		7th	9th	
Yugoslavia †	7th	2nd	2nd	4th	1st	1st	1st	3rd	2nd	2nd	3rd	1st	1st	5th	†
Team	(Italy) 1964	(Italy) 1966	(Spain) 1968	(Greece) 1970	(Socialist Federal Republic of Yugoslavia) 1972	(France) 1974	(Spain) 1976	(Italy) 1978	(Socialist Federal Republic of Yugoslavia) 1980	(Bulgaria) 1982	(Sweden) 1984	(Austria) 1986	(Socialist Federal Republic of Yugoslavia) 1988	(Netherlands) 1990	(Hungary) 1992

==== Tournaments 1994–2013 ====
Team	(Israel) 1994	(France) 1996	(Bulgaria) 1998	(Croatia) 2000	(Germany) 2002	(Spain) 2004	(Serbia and Montenegro) 2005	(Greece) 2006	(Spain) 2007	(Greece) 2008	(France) 2009	(Lithuania) 2010	(Poland) 2011	(Lithuania) (Latvia) 2012	(Latvia) 2013
Belgium		4th					16th			15th					
Bosnia and Herzegovina															13th
Bulgaria			8th	12th		10th	12th	8th	14th	13th	10th	16th		8th	15th
Croatia	2nd	1st	2nd	2nd	1st		11th	10th	7th	3rd	8th	5th	8th	1st	2nd
Czech Republic											16th		15th		12th
Denmark														15th	
England															9th
Estonia									12th	16th					
Finland													16th		
France	5th	2nd	10th	1st	7th	3rd	6th	1st	6th	4th	2nd	7th	7th	13th	7th
Georgia						11th									
Germany	12th	8th			12th		14th	13th	9th	14th	11th	13th	11th	14th	
Greece	6th	7th	3rd	3rd	3rd	7th	13th	6th	2nd	1st	13th	8th	14th	11th	11th
Iceland								15th							
Israel	10th		6th	10th	6th	8th	7th	11th	11th	10th	15th				
Italy	4th	6th	12th	4th		4th	3rd	7th	13th	11th	7th	12th	4th	7th	10th
Latvia			4th	8th	11th	12th	8th	12th	3rd	7th	9th	3rd	10th	6th	4th
Lithuania	1st	12th	9th	7th	4th	9th	9th	2nd	4th	2nd	4th	1st	5th	2nd	5th
Poland					8th		15th					6th	6th	16th	
Portugal															
Romania		11th							16th						
Russia	8th	10th	5th	6th	10th	6th	5th	9th	10th	8th	6th	2nd	9th	4th	8th
Serbia	played as part of (Serbia and Montenegro)								1st	6th	1st	4th	2nd	3rd	6th
Serbia and Montenegro †^{A}		3rd		5th		5th	1st	5th	defunct						
Slovenia	7th		7th	9th	2nd		10th	14th	15th		12th	10th	12th	10th	16th
Spain	3rd	9th	1st	11th	9th	1st	4th	3rd	5th	5th	5th	11th	1st	5th	3rd
Sweden												15th			
Turkey	9th	5th	11th		5th	2nd	2nd	4th	8th	9th	3rd	9th	3rd	9th	1st
Ukraine	11th							16th		12th	14th	14th	13th	12th	14th
Team	(Israel) 1994	(France) 1996	(Bulgaria) 1998	(Croatia) 2000	(Germany) 2002	(Spain) 2004	(Serbia and Montenegro) 2005	(Greece) 2006	(Spain) 2007	(Greece) 2008	(France) 2009	(Lithuania) 2010	(Poland) 2011	(Lithuania) (Latvia) 2012	(Latvia) 2013
Austria	playing in lower divisions														
Hungary	playing in lower divisions														
Netherlands	playing in lower divisions														
Norway	playing in lower divisions														
Czechoslovakia †	defunct														
Soviet Union †	defunct														
Yugoslavia †	defunct														

==== Tournaments 2014–present ====
Team	(Turkey) 2014	(Greece) 2015	(Turkey) 2016	(Slovakia) 2017	(Latvia) 2018	(Greece) 2019	(Turkey) 2022	(Serbia) 2023	(Finland) 2024	(Serbia) 2025	(Italy) 2026	(Portugal) 2027	(Estonia) 2028	Total
Austria										12th	13th			5
Belgium	15th								7th	15th				12
Bosnia and Herzegovina	12th	4th	6th	8th	16th									6
Bulgaria										13th	16th			22
Croatia	3rd	12th	14th		11th	13th	13th	10th	14th					22
Czech Republic	13th	16th					10th	16th						7
Denmark								13th	16th		12th			4
England	14th			Great Britain										2
Estonia											10th		Q	3
Finland		13th	8th	10th	13th	14th		15th	15th					17
France	9th	6th	1st	6th	3rd	5th	5th	4th	5th	2nd	3rd			36
Germany		8th	4th	11th	6th	11th	11th	3rd	1st	7th	5th			32
Great Britain	ENG/SCO/WAL						7th	8th	15th					3
Greece	4th	1st	9th	7th	14th	4th	12th	7th	10th	11th	6th			37
Israel			15th				8th	6th	4th	10th	7th			24
Italy	6th	11th	3rd	5th	10th	9th	6th	9th	9th	3rd	2nd			40
Latvia	8th	10th	13th	16th	2nd	16th			12th	4th	14th			22
Lithuania	7th	3rd	2nd	3rd	5th	7th	7th	11th	6th	9th	11th			26
Montenegro	11th	14th		13th	8th	12th	16th							7
Netherlands						15th								5
North Macedonia							14th			14th				2
Poland	16th						9th	14th						18
Portugal												Q		1
Russia	10th	9th	7th	9th	4th	6th								22
Serbia	2nd	5th	10th	1st	1st	10th	3rd	1st	2nd	5th	9th			18
Slovakia				15th							15th			2
Slovenia			11th	14th		3rd	4th	8th	3rd	6th	1st			20
Spain	5th	7th	5th	2nd	9th	1st	1st	2nd	13th	1st	4th			41
Sweden			16th					12th	8th	16th				10
Turkey	1st	2nd	12th	4th	12th	2nd	2nd	5th	11th	8th	8th			35
Ukraine		15th		12th	15th									11
Team	(Turkey) 2014	(Greece) 2015	(Turkey) 2016	(Slovakia) 2017	(Latvia) 2018	(Greece) 2019	(Turkey) 2022	(Serbia) 2023	(Finland) 2024	(Serbia) 2025	(Italy) 2026	(Portugal) 2027	(Estonia) 2028	Total
Georgia	playing in lower divisions													1
Hungary	playing in lower divisions													4
Iceland	playing in lower divisions													1
Norway	playing in lower divisions													1
Romania	playing in lower divisions													5
Czechoslovakia †	defunct													13
Soviet Union †	defunct													15
Yugoslavia †	defunct													14
Serbia and Montenegro †^{A}	defunct													5

^{^A} As FR Yugoslavia (1996–2002, 2 participations, 1 medal) and as Serbia and Montenegro (2003–2006, 3 participations, 1 medal)

=== MVP Awards (since 1998) ===
Year	MVP Award Winner
1998	(Slovenia) Sani Bečirović
2000	(France) Tony Parker
2002	(Slovenia) Erazem Lorbek
2004	(Spain) Sergio Rodríguez
2005	(Serbia and Montenegro) Dragan Labović
2006	(France) Nicolas Batum
2007	(Greece) Kosta Koufos
2008	(Lithuania) Donatas Motiejūnas
2009	(Turkey) Enes Kanter
2010	(Lithuania) Jonas Valančiūnas
2011	(Spain) Álex Abrines
2012	(Croatia) Dario Šarić
2013	(Turkey) Kenan Sipahi
2014	(Turkey) Egemen Güven
2015	(Greece) Vassilis Charalampopoulos
2016	(France) Frank Ntilikina
2017	(Serbia) Nikola Mišković
2018	(Serbia) Marko Pecarski
2019	(Spain) Santiago Aldama
2022	(Spain) Izan Almansa
2023	(Serbia) Nikola Topić
2024	(Israel) Ben Saraf
2025	(Spain) Ian Platteeuw
2026	(Slovenia) Stefan Joksimović

== Division B ==
=== Results ===
Year	Host	Promoted to Division A			Bronze medal game		
Year	Host	Gold	Score	Silver	Bronze *	Score	Fourth place
2005 details	Slovakia	Ukraine	82–56	Iceland	Hungary	97–76	Finland
2006 details	Romania	Romania	67–54	Estonia	Portugal	76–74	England
2007 details	Bulgaria	Belgium	86–58	Ukraine	Poland	80–68	Montenegro
2008 details	Hungary	Slovenia	68–60	Czech Republic	Poland	70–60	Slovakia
2009 details	Bosnia and Herzegovina	Sweden	87–71	Poland	Montenegro	73–71	England
2010 details	Israel	Czech Republic	78–46	Finland	Montenegro	75–60	Israel
2011 details	Bulgaria	Bulgaria	70–68	Denmark	Sweden	71–65	Montenegro
2012 details	Bosnia and Herzegovina	Bosnia and Herzegovina	76–64	Czech Republic	England	73–59	Finland
2013 details	Macedonia	Montenegro	64–63	Poland	Belgium	70–45	Macedonia
2014 details	Bulgaria	Germany	64–40	Ukraine	Finland	70–50	Sweden
2015 details	Austria	Sweden	73–72	Israel	Slovenia	78–60	Poland
2016 details	Macedonia	Montenegro	83–72	Ukraine	Slovakia	63–62	Hungary
2017 details	Estonia (Tallinn)	Croatia	90–84	Great Britain	Estonia (Note: Estonia was not promoted due to Latvia hosting the 2018 Division A tournament.)	90–71	Israel
2018 details	Macedonia (Skopje)	Netherlands	86–57	Slovenia	Belgium (Note: Belgium was not promoted due to Greece hosting the 2019 Division A tournament.)	73–67	Estonia
2019 details	Romania (Oradea)	Israel	81–79	Poland	Czech Republic	89–80	North Macedonia
2020	Romania	Cancelled due to COVID-19 pandemic in Romania.					
2021	Romania	Cancelled due to COVID-19 pandemic in Europe. The 2021 FIBA U18 European Challengers were played instead.					
2022 details	Romania (Ploiești)	Sweden	79–66	Denmark	Finland	72–66	Iceland
2023 details	Portugal (Matosinhos)	Latvia	75–69	Belgium	Montenegro	85–80	Austria
2024 details	North Macedonia (Skopje)	North Macedonia	98–88	Austria	Bulgaria	85–64	Poland
2025 details	Romania (Pitești & Mioveni)	Denmark	83–77	Estonia	Slovakia	85–52	Romania
2026 details	Croatia (Rijeka & Opatija)	Netherlands	71–57	Poland	Belgium	81–64	Czech Republic

- Since 2012, the 3rd team in Division B is also promoted to Division A for the next tournament.

=== Medal table ===
Rank	Nation	Gold	Silver	Bronze	Total
1	Sweden	3	0	1	4
2	Montenegro	2	0	3	5
3	Netherlands	2	0	0	2
4	Ukraine	1	3	0	4
5	Czech Republic	1	2	1	4
6	Denmark	1	2	0	3
7	Belgium	1	1	3	5
8	Slovenia	1	1	1	3
9	Israel	1	1	0	2
10	Bulgaria	1	0	1	2
11	Bosnia and Herzegovina	1	0	0	1
11	Croatia	1	0	0	1
11	Germany	1	0	0	1
11	Latvia	1	0	0	1
11	North Macedonia	1	0	0	1
11	Romania	1	0	0	1
17	Poland	0	4	2	6
18	Estonia	0	2	1	3
19	Finland	0	1	2	3
20	Austria	0	1	0	1
20	Great Britain	0	1	0	1
20	Iceland	0	1	0	1
23	Slovakia	0	0	2	2
24	England	0	0	1	1
24	Hungary	0	0	1	1
24	Portugal	0	0	1	1
Totals (26 entries)		20	20	20	60

=== Participation details ===
Team	(Slovakia) 2005	(Romania) 2006	(Bulgaria) 2007	(Hungary) 2008	(Bosnia and Herzegovina) 2009	(Israel) 2010	(Bulgaria) 2011	(Bosnia and Herzegovina) 2012	(North Macedonia) 2013	(Bulgaria) 2014	(Austria) 2015	(North Macedonia) 2016	(Estonia) 2017	(North Macedonia) 2018	(Romania) 2019	(Romania) 2022	(Portugal) 2023	(North Macedonia) 2024	(Romania) 2025	(Croatia) 2026	Total
Armenia			20th																		1
Albania											23rd	21st	21st	24th			22nd				5
Austria	7th	7th	13th	5th	11th	10th	18th	12th	20th	16th	13th	18th	17th	16th	17th	12th	4th	2nd			18
Azerbaijan													22nd	20th					21st	16th	4
Belarus				15th	19th	9th		18th	12th		18th	11th	20th	6th	13th						10
Belgium		8th	1st		5th	7th	9th	8th	3rd		9th	5th	9th	3rd	10th	10th	2nd			3rd	15
Bosnia and Herzegovina	8th	9th	7th	14th	8th	8th		1st							12th	6th	14th	18th	7th	12th	13
Bulgaria			*				1st			14th	19th	12th	7th	11th	14th	16th	10th	3rd			10
Croatia													1st						10th	8th	3
Cyprus												24th				22nd		22nd		22nd	4
Czech Republic	15th	10th	6th	2nd		1st		2nd				8th	13th	5th	3rd			8th	13th	4th	13
Denmark			17th	8th	14th	15th	2nd		17th	12th	10th	15th	8th	22nd	18th	2nd			1st		14
Estonia	10th	2nd			7th	5th	5th	6th	7th	17th	15th	7th	3rd	4th	5th	9th	13th	17th	2nd		17
Finland	4th	12th	9th	10th	10th	2nd		4th	9th	3rd						3rd			18th	11th	12
Georgia				13th	15th	19th	15th	17th	21st	20th	8th	10th	18th	21st	8th	15th	19th	16th	12th	7th	17
Germany									11th	1st											2
Great Britain	played separately as (England) , (Scotland) and (Wales)												2nd				5th	19th	16th	13th	5
Hungary	3rd	11th	8th	17th	9th	13th	8th	11th	13th	8th	5th	4th	12th	10th	15th	14th	11th	9th	6th	5th	20
Iceland	2nd				13th			13th		9th	6th	13th	10th	15th	11th	4th	12th	12th	15th	15th	14
Ireland	16th	19th	16th	20th						22nd	22nd	23rd	24th		16th	20th	20th	11th	20th	17th	14
Israel						4th	7th	7th	5th	6th	2nd		4th	9th	1st						9
Kosovo															23rd	21st	21st	21st	22nd		5
Latvia																13th	1st				2
Luxembourg	11th	16th	15th			16th	17th	19th	19th	11th	24th	19th	23rd	19th	24th						13
Moldova		17th																			1
Montenegro			4th	11th	3rd	3rd	4th	5th	1st			1st					3rd	5th	5th	9th	12
Netherlands	6th	14th	14th	9th	6th	12th	6th	9th	8th	13th	11th	17th	6th	1st		8th	6th	20th	9th	1st	19
North Macedonia	12th								4th	15th	21st	16th	16th	18th	4th		16th	1st		14th	11
Norway		13th	11th	19th	17th		16th	20th	14th	10th				13th	20th	18th	17th	10th	19th	20th	15
Poland		6th	3rd	3rd	2nd				2nd		4th	6th	5th	12th	2nd			4th	8th	2nd	13
Portugal	5th	3rd	12th	7th	18th	18th	12th	10th	10th	7th	12th	14th	11th	8th	6th	5th	9th	7th	11th	18th	20
Romania	17th	1st		12th	20th	20th	11th	15th	16th	18th	16th	20th	15th	23rd	21st	7th	7th	14th	4th	6th	19
Slovakia	13th	15th	10th	4th	21st	17th	10th	16th	18th		17th	3rd		14th	22nd	17th	8th	15th	3rd		17
Slovenia				1st						5th	3rd			2nd							4
Sweden	9th	5th	5th	6th	1st		3rd	14th	6th	4th	1st		14th	7th	7th	1st				19th	15
Switzerland			19th	16th	12th	11th	13th	21st	15th	21st	14th		19th	17th	19th	19th	18th	6th	14th	10th	17
Ukraine	1st		2nd							2nd		2nd			9th	11th	15th	13th	17th	21st	10
Team	(Slovakia) 2005	(Romania) 2006	(Bulgaria) 2007	(Hungary) 2008	(Bosnia and Herzegovina) 2009	(Israel) 2010	(Bulgaria) 2011	(Bosnia and Herzegovina) 2012	(North Macedonia) 2013	(Bulgaria) 2014	(Austria) 2015	(North Macedonia) 2016	(Estonia) 2017	(North Macedonia) 2018	(Romania) 2019	(Romania) 2022	(Portugal) 2023	(North Macedonia) 2024	(Romania) 2025	(Croatia) 2026	Total
England	14th	4th	18th	18th	4th	6th	14th	3rd			7th	9th	Great Britain								10
Scotland		18th			16th	14th		22nd	22nd	19th	20th	22nd	Great Britain								8

== Division C ==
=== Results ===
Year	Host	Gold medal game			Bronze medal game		
Year	Host	Gold	Score	Silver	Bronze	Score	Fourth place
1997 details	Andorra	Moldova	85–78	Andorra	Cyprus	114–81	San Marino
1999 details	Luxembourg	Iceland	93–65	Ireland	Luxembourg	93–90	Andorra
2001 details	Malta	Cyprus	76–74	Scotland	Luxembourg	74–69	Albania
2003 details	Malta	Albania	round robin	Scotland	Andorra	round robin	Malta
2005 details	Malta	Andorra	97–85	Scotland	Luxembourg	81–39	Wales
2007 details	Wales	Scotland	round robin	Wales	Moldova	N/A	Andorra
2009 details	Malta	Malta	75–38	Gibraltar	Andorra	76–71	Moldova
2011 details	San Marino	Wales	round robin	San Marino	Moldova	round robin	Andorra
2013 details	Andorra	San Marino	103–100 (OT)	Moldova	Andorra	70–50	Monaco
2014 details	Andorra	Monaco	66–38	Gibraltar	Andorra	51–46	San Marino
2015 details	Gibraltar	Andorra	80–66	Azerbaijan	Wales	82–64	Malta
2016 details	San Marino	Azerbaijan	74–57	Andorra	Kosovo	100–57	San Marino
2017 details	Cyprus (Nicosia)	Norway	84–53	Cyprus	Malta	68–61	Moldova
2018 details	Kosovo (Pristina)	Kosovo	73–64	Cyprus	Ireland	93–91	Monaco
2019 details	Andorra (Andorra la Vella)	Cyprus	67–59	Monaco	Albania	66–58	San Marino
2020	San Marino	Cancelled due to COVID-19 pandemic in San Marino.					
2021	San Marino	Cancelled due to COVID-19 pandemic in Europe. The 2021 FIBA U18 European Challengers were played instead.					
2022 details	San Marino (Serravalle)	Albania	93–78	Monaco	Azerbaijan	78–73 (OT)	Luxembourg
2023 details	Azerbaijan (Baku)	Cyprus	68–48	Monaco	Moldova	76–68	Luxembourg
2024 details	Albania (Elbasan)	Azerbaijan	77–71	Luxembourg	Albania	79–53	Armenia
2025 details	Albania (Tirana)	Cyprus	70–60	Luxembourg	Armenia	81–77	Andorra
2026 details	Albania (Shkoder)	Kosovo	91–49	Andorra	Albania	101–61	Malta

=== Medal table ===
Rank	Nation	Gold	Silver	Bronze	Total
1	Cyprus	4	2	1	7
2	Andorra	2	3	4	9
3	Azerbaijan	2	1	1	4
4	Albania	2	0	3	5
5	Kosovo	2	0	1	3
6	Monaco	1	3	0	4
6	Scotland	1	3	0	4
8	Moldova	1	1	3	5
9	Wales	1	1	1	3
10	San Marino	1	1	0	2
11	Malta	1	0	1	2
12	Iceland	1	0	0	1
12	Norway	1	0	0	1
14	Luxembourg	0	2	3	5
15	Gibraltar	0	2	0	2
16	Ireland	0	1	1	2
17	Armenia	0	0	1	1
Totals (17 entries)		20	20	20	60

=== Participation details ===
Team	(Andorra) 1997	(Luxembourg) 1999	(Malta) 2001	(Malta) 2003	(Malta) 2005	(Wales) 2007	(Malta) 2009	(San Marino) 2011	(Andorra) 2013	(Andorra) 2014	(Gibraltar) 2015	(San Marino) 2016	(Cyprus) 2017	(Kosovo) 2018	(Andorra) 2019	(San Marino) 2022	(Azerbaijan) 2023	(Albania) 2024	(Albania) 2025	(Albania) 2026	Total
Albania		7th	4th	1st											3rd	1st		3rd	5th	3rd	8
Andorra	2nd	4th	6th	3rd	1st	4th	3rd	4th	3rd	3rd	1st	2nd			6th	5th	6th		4th	2nd	17
Armenia													6th	8th	8th	8th		4th	3rd	5th	7
Azerbaijan						8th					2nd	1st				3rd	5th	1st			6
Cyprus	3rd		1st										2nd	2nd	1st		1st		1st		7
Gibraltar	8th	8th	7th	5th	8th	6th	2nd	5th	5th	2nd	6th	9th	8th	7th	5th	10th	9th	7th	10th	7th	20
Iceland		1st																			1
Ireland	5th	2nd												3rd							3
Luxembourg	6th	3rd	3rd		3rd											4th	4th	2nd	2nd		8
Kosovo												3rd	5th	1st						1st	4
Malta	7th	6th	5th	4th	6th	7th	1st			5th	4th	7th	3rd	9th	7th	6th	8th		9th	4th	17
Moldova	1st					3rd	4th	3rd	2nd			8th	4th	5th	9th	7th	3rd	6th	6th	6th	14
Monaco					5th	5th	6th		4th	1st		6th		4th	2nd	2nd	2nd		8th		11
Norway													1st								1
San Marino	4th				7th	9th	7th	2nd	1st	4th	5th	4th	7th	6th	4th	9th	7th	5th	7th	8th	17
Team	(Andorra) 1997	(Luxembourg) 1999	(Malta) 2001	(Malta) 2003	(Malta) 2005	(Wales) 2007	(Malta) 2009	(San Marino) 2011	(Andorra) 2013	(Andorra) 2014	(Gibraltar) 2015	(San Marino) 2016	(Cyprus) 2017	(Kosovo) 2018	(Andorra) 2019	(San Marino) 2022	(Azerbaijan) 2023	(Albania) 2024	(Albania) 2025	(Albania) 2026	Total
Scotland			2nd	2nd	2nd	1st							Great Britain								4
Wales		5th			4th	2nd	5th	1st	6th	6th	3rd	5th	Great Britain								9

== Under-19 World Cup record ==
Team	(Brazil) 1979	(Spain) 1983	(Italy) 1987	(Canada) 1991	(Greece) 1995	(Portugal) 1999	(Greece) 2003	(Serbia) 2007	(New Zealand) 2009	(Latvia) 2011	(Czech Republic) 2013	(Greece) 2015	(Egypt) 2017	(Greece) 2019	(Latvia) 2021	(Hungary) 2023	(Switzerland) 2025	(Czech Republic) 2027	(Indonesia) 2029	Total
Croatia	Part of Yugoslavia				4th	3rd	4th	–	3rd	8th	8th	2nd	–	–	–	–	–	–		7
Czech Republic	Part of Czechoslovakia				–	–	–	–	–	–	14th	–	–	–	–	–	–	Q		2
France	–	–	–	–	8th	–	–	3rd	8th	–	–	–	7th	3rd	2nd	2nd	10th	Q		9
Germany	–	5th	4th	–	–	–	–	–	–	–	–	–	5th	–	–	–	2nd	Q		5
Greece	–	–	–	–	1st	7th	3rd	–	2nd	–	–	4th	–	10th	–	–	–	–		6
Hungary	–	–	–	–	–	–	–	–	–	–	–	–	–	–	–	16th	–	–		1
Israel	–	–	–	–	–	–	–	–	–	–	–	–	–	–	–	–	7th	–		1
Italy	6th	6th	3rd	2nd	13th	–	–	–	–	–	–	–	6th	2nd	–	–	–	Q		8
Latvia	Part of Soviet Union				–	9th	–	–	–	10th	–	–	–	12th	11th	–	–	–		4
Lithuania	Part of Soviet Union				5th	–	2nd	9th	9th	1st	3rd	–	6th	4th	6th	–	–	–		9
Poland	–	–	–	–	–	–	–	–	–	7th	–	–	–	–	–	–	–	–		1
Portugal	–	–	–	–	–	16th	–	–	–	–	–	–	–	–	–	–	–	–		1
Romania	–	–	–	5th	–	–	–	–	–	–	–	–	–	–	–	–	–	–		1
Russia	Part of Soviet Union				–	6th	–	–	–	3rd	9th	–	–	5th	–	–	–	–		4
Serbia	Part of Yugoslavia				–	–	–	1st	–	2nd	2nd	9th	–	7th	4th	6th	9th	–		8
Slovenia	Part of Yugoslavia				–	–	7th	–	–	–	–	–	–	–	–	9th	3rd	Q		4
Spain	–	4th	–	6th	3rd	1st	–	8th	10th	–	5th	8th	4th	–	5th	1st	–	Q		12
Switzerland	–	–	–	–	–	–	–	–	–	–	–	–	–	–	–	–	8th	–		1
Turkey	–	–	–	–	–	–	8th	7th	–	–	–	3rd	–	–	9th	3rd	–	–		5
Team	(Brazil) 1979	(Spain) 1983	(Italy) 1987	(Canada) 1991	(Greece) 1995	(Portugal) 1999	(Greece) 2003	(Serbia) 2007	(New Zealand) 2009	(Latvia) 2011	(Czech Republic) 2013	(Greece) 2015	(Egypt) 2017	(Greece) 2019	(Latvia) 2021	(Hungary) 2023	(Switzerland) 2025	(Czech Republic) 2027	(Indonesia) 2029	Total
Soviet Union †	5th	2nd	7th	9th	defunct															4
Yugoslavia †	4th	8th	1st	4th	defunct															4
Total	3	5	4	4	5	4	4	4	5	6	5	6	5	6	6	6	6	6	5	

== See also ==
- FIBA U16 EuroBasket
- FIBA U20 EuroBasket
