= Ukraine men's national under-18 basketball team =

National basketball team of Ukraine

Ukraine
- FIBA zone: FIBA Europe
- National federation: Basketball Federation of Ukraine

U19 World Cup
- Appearances: None

U18 EuroBasket
- Appearances: 11
- Medals: None

U18 EuroBasket Division B
- Appearances: 10
- Medals: Gold: 1 (2005); Silver: 3 (2007, 2014, 2016)
Home	Away

The Ukraine men's national under-18 basketball team is a national basketball team of Ukraine, administered by the Basketball Federation of Ukraine. It represents the country in international under-18 men's basketball competitions.

== FIBA U18 EuroBasket participations ==
Year	Division A	Division B
1994	11th	
2005		1st place, gold medalist(s)
2006	16th	
2007		2nd place, silver medalist(s)
2008	12th	
2009	14th	
2010	14th	
2011	13th	
2012	12th	
2013	14th	
2014		2nd place, silver medalist(s)

Year	Division A	Division B
2015	15th	
2016		2nd place, silver medalist(s)
2017	12th	
2018	15th	
2019		9th
2022		11th
2023		15th
2024		13th
2025		17th
2026		21st

== See also ==
- Ukraine men's national basketball team
- Ukraine men's national under-16 basketball team
- Ukraine women's national under-18 basketball team
