= 2011 FIBA Europe Under-18 Championship Division B =

Tournament details
- Host country: Bulgaria
- Teams: 18

Final positions
- Champions: Bulgaria (1st title)

Official website
- www.fibaeurope.com

The 2011 FIBA Europe Under-18 Championship Division B was an international basketball competition held in Bulgaria in 2011.

== Final ranking ==
1. Bulgaria

2. Denmark

3. Sweden

4. Montenegro

5. Estonia

6. Netherlands

7. Israel

8. Hungary

9. Belgium

10. Slovakia

11. Romania

12. Portugal

13. Switzerland

14. England

15. (Georgia (country)) Georgia

16. Norway

17. Luxembourg

18. Austria

== Awards ==
Winners
Bulgaria
