= 2013 FIBA Europe Under-18 Championship Division B =

- 2013 FIBA Europe Under-18 Championship Division B

Tournament details
- Host country: Macedonia
- Teams: 22
- Venue(s): (in Strumica host cities)

Final positions
- Champions: Montenegro (1st title)

Official website
- www.fibaeurope.com

The 2013 FIBA Europe Under-18 Championship Division B was an international basketball competition held in Strumica, Macedonia in 2013.

== Final ranking ==
1. Montenegro

2. Poland

3. Belgium

4. (North Macedonia) Macedonia

5. Israel

6. Sweden

7. Estonia

8. Netherlands

9. Finland

10. Portugal

11. Germany

12. Belarus

13. Hungary

14. Norway

15. Switzerland

16. Romania

17. Denmark

18. Slovakia

19. Luxembourg

20. Austria

21. (Georgia (country)) Georgia

22. Scotland

== Awards ==
Winners
Montenegro
