= Austria men's national under-18 basketball team =

Youth basketball team representing Austria

Austria
- FIBA zone: FIBA Europe
- National federation: Austrian Basketball Federation

U19 World Cup
- Appearances: None

U18 EuroBasket
- Appearances: 5
- Medals: None

U18 EuroBasket Division B
- Appearances: 18
- Medals: Silver: 1 (2024)

The Austria men's national under-18 basketball team is a national basketball team of Austria, administered by the Austrian Basketball Federation. It represents the country in international under-18 men's basketball competitions.

== FIBA U18 EuroBasket participations ==
Year	Division A	Division B
1968	12th	
1974	16th	
1986	12th	
2005		7th
2006		7th
2007		13th
2008		5th
2009		11th
2010		10th
2011		18th
2012		12th
2013		20th

Year	Division A	Division B
2014		16th
2015		13th
2016		18th
2017		17th
2018		16th
2019		17th
2022		12th
2023		4th
2024		2nd place, silver medalist(s)
2025	12th	
2026	13th	

== See also ==
- Austria men's national basketball team
- Austria men's national under-16 basketball team
- Austria women's national under-18 basketball team
