= Slovakia men's national under-18 basketball team =

Slovak youth national team

Slovakia
- FIBA zone: FIBA Europe
- National federation: Slovak Basketball Association

U19 World Cup
- Appearances: None

U18 EuroBasket
- Appearances: 2
- Medals: None

U18 EuroBasket Division B
- Appearances: 17
- Medals: Bronze: 2 (2016, 2025)
Home	Away

The Slovakia men's national under-18 basketball team is a national basketball team of Slovakia, administered by the Slovak Basketball Association. It represents the country in international under-18 men's basketball competitions.

== FIBA U18 EuroBasket participations ==
Year	Division A	Division B
2005		13th
2006		15th
2007		10th
2008		4th
2009		21st
2010		17th
2011		10th
2012		16th
2013		18th
2015		17th

Year	Division A	Division B
2016		3rd place, bronze medalist(s)
2017	15th	
2018		14th
2019		22nd
2022		17th
2023		8th
2024		15th
2025		3rd place, bronze medalist(s)
2026	15th	

== See also ==
- Slovakia men's national basketball team
- Slovakia men's national under-16 basketball team
- Slovakia women's national under-19 basketball team
