= Iceland men's national under-18 basketball team =

Iceland
- FIBA zone: FIBA Europe
- National federation: KKÍ

U19 World Cup
- Appearances: None

U18 EuroBasket
- Appearances: 1
- Medals: None

U18 EuroBasket Division B
- Appearances: 14
- Medals: Silver: 1 (2005)

U18 EuroBasket Division C
- Appearances: 1
- Medals: Gold: 1 (1999)
Home	Away

The Iceland men's national under-18 basketball team is a national basketball team of Iceland, administered by the Icelandic Basketball Association. It represents the country in international under-18 men's basketball competitions.

== FIBA U18 EuroBasket participations ==
Year	Division A	Division B	Division C
1999			1st place, gold medalist(s)
2005		2nd place, silver medalist(s)	
2006	15th		
2009		13th	
2012		13th	
2014		9th	
2015		6th	
2016		13th	

Year	Division A	Division B
2017		10th
2018		15th
2019		11th
2022		4th
2023		12th
2024		12th
2025		15th
2026		15th

== See also ==
- Iceland men's national basketball team
- Iceland men's national under-16 basketball team
- Iceland women's national under-18 basketball team
