= 2005 FIBA Europe Under-18 Championship Division B =

Tournament details
- Host country: Slovakia
- Teams: 17

Final positions
- Champions: Ukraine (1st title)

The 2005 FIBA Europe Under-18 Championship Division B was an international basketball competition held in Slovakia in 2005.

== Final ranking ==
1. Ukraine

2. Iceland

3. Hungary

4. Finland

5. Portugal

6. Netherlands

7. Austria

8. Bosnia and Herzegovina

9. Sweden

10. Estonia

11. Luxembourg

12. (North Macedonia) Macedonia

13. Slovakia

14. England

15. Czech Republic

16. (Republic of Ireland) Ireland

17. Romania

== Awards ==
Winners
Ukraine
