= 1980 FIBA Europe Under-18 Championship =

International basketball competition

1980 FIBA U18 European Championship
9th FIBA Under-18 European Basketball Championship

Tournament details
- Host country: Yugoslavia
- Dates: August 11 – August 30
- Teams: 12

Final positions
- Champions: Soviet Union (6th title)

Tournament statistics
- Top scorer: (Spain) Fernando Martin (26.4)
- PPG (Team): Soviet Union (102.7)

The 1980 FIBA Europe Under-18 Championship was an international basketball competition held in Yugoslavia in 1980.

== Final ranking ==
1. Soviet Union

2. Yugoslavia

3. Bulgaria

4. Spain

5. Italy

6. West Germany

7. Israel

8. Czechoslovakia

9. Turkey

10. Sweden

11. Belgium

12. France

== Awards ==
Winners
Soviet Union
