= Sweden men's national under-18 basketball team =

Youth basketball team representing Sweden

Sweden
- FIBA zone: FIBA Europe
- National federation: Swedish Basketball Federation
- Nickname(s): Blågult (The Blue and Yellow)

U19 World Cup
- Appearances: None

U18 EuroBasket
- Appearances: 10
- Medals: None

U18 EuroBasket Division B
- Appearances: 15
- Medals: Gold: 3 (2009, 2015, 2022); Bronze: 1 (2011)
Home	Away

The Sweden men's national under-18 basketball team (Swedish: Svenska juniorlandslaget i basket) is a national basketball team of Sweden, administered by the Svenska Basketbollförbundet. It represents the country in international under-18 men's basketball competitions.

== FIBA U18 EuroBasket participations ==
Year	Division A	Division B
1974	4th	
1976	12th	
1980	10th	
1984	12th	
1988	8th	
2005		9th
2006		5th
2007		5th
2008		6th
2009		1st place, gold medalist(s)
2010	15th	
2011		3rd place, bronze medalist(s)
2012		14th

Year	Division A	Division B
2013		6th
2014		4th
2015		1st place, gold medalist(s)
2016	16th	
2017		14th
2018		7th
2019		7th
2022		1st place, gold medalist(s)
2023	12th	
2024	8th	
2025	16th	
2026		19th

== See also ==
- Sweden men's national basketball team
- Sweden men's national under-16 basketball team
- Sweden women's national under-19 basketball team
