= 2017 FIBA U18 European Championship Division B =

Tournament details
- Host country: Estonia
- City: Tallinn
- Dates: 28 July – 6 August 2017
- Teams: 24 (from 1 confederation)
- Venue(s): 3 (in 1 host city)

Final positions
- Champions: Croatia (1st title)
- Runners-up: Great Britain
- Third place: Estonia

Official website
- www.fiba.basketball

The 2017 FIBA U18 European Championship Division B was the 13th edition of Division B of the FIBA U18 European basketball championship. It was played in Tallinn, Estonia, from 28 July to 6 August 2017. 24 teams participated in the competition. Croatia men's national under-18 basketball team won the tournament.

== Participating teams ==
- Albania
- Austria
- Azerbaijan ▲ (Winners, 2016 FIBA U18 European Championship Division C)
- Belarus
- Belgium
- Bulgaria
- Croatia ▼ (14th place, 2016 FIBA U18 European Championship Division A)
- Czech Republic
- Denmark
- Estonia
- Georgia
- Great Britain
- Hungary
- Iceland
- Ireland
- Israel ▼ (15th place, 2016 FIBA U18 European Championship Division A)
- Luxembourg
- Macedonia
- Netherlands
- Poland
- Portugal
- Romania
- Sweden ▼ (16th place, 2016 FIBA U18 European Championship Division A)
- Switzerland

== First round ==
=== Group A ===
Pos	Team	Pld	W	L	PF	PA	PD	Pts	Team advances to
1	Great Britain	5	4	1	429	325	+104	9	Quarterfinals
2	Netherlands	5	4	1	437	335	+102	9	Quarterfinals
3	Czech Republic	5	3	2	355	315	+40	8	9th–16th place playoffs
4	Sweden	5	3	2	379	369	+10	8	9th–16th place playoffs
5	Luxembourg	5	1	4	335	417	−82	6	17th–24th place playoffs
6	Albania	5	0	5	280	454	−174	5	17th–24th place playoffs

Source: www.fiba.basketball

=== Group B ===
Pos	Team	Pld	W	L	PF	PA	PD	Pts	Team advances to
1	Croatia	5	5	0	359	272	+87	10	Quarterfinals
2	Bulgaria	5	3	2	380	373	+7	8	Quarterfinals
3	Iceland	5	3	2	365	374	−9	8	9th–16th place playoffs
4	Hungary	5	2	3	357	384	−27	7	9th–16th place playoffs
5	Belarus	5	2	3	410	380	+30	7	17th–24th place playoffs
6	Georgia	5	0	5	312	400	−88	5	17th–24th place playoffs

Source: www.fiba.basketball

=== Group C ===
Pos	Team	Pld	W	L	PF	PA	PD	Pts	Team advances to
1	Israel	5	5	0	412	333	+79	10	Quarterfinals
2	Poland	5	4	1	374	314	+60	9	Quarterfinals
3	Portugal	5	3	2	354	312	+42	8	9th–16th place playoffs
4	Romania	5	2	3	311	333	−22	7	9th–16th place playoffs
5	Austria	5	1	4	337	380	−43	6	17th–24th place playoffs
6	Azerbaijan	5	0	5	262	378	−116	5	17th–24th place playoffs

Source: www.fiba.basketball

=== Group D ===
Pos	Team	Pld	W	L	PF	PA	PD	Pts	Team advances to
1	Estonia	5	5	0	425	291	+134	10	Quarterfinals
2	Denmark	5	3	2	343	346	−3	8	Quarterfinals
3	Belgium	5	3	2	365	307	+58	8	9th–16th place playoffs
4	Macedonia	5	2	3	368	371	−3	7	9th–16th place playoffs
5	Switzerland	5	2	3	292	371	−79	7	17th–24th place playoffs
6	Ireland	5	0	5	292	399	−107	5	17th–24th place playoffs

Source: www.fiba.basketball

== Playoffs ==
=== 17th–24th place playoffs ===
21st place match
C6	Azerbaijan	56
A6	Albania	69
23rd place match
A5	Luxembourg	72
D6	Ireland	63

21st–24th place semifinals
A5	Luxembourg	69
C6	Azerbaijan	73
A6	Albania	82
D6	Ireland	75

17th–24th place quarterfinals
A5	Luxembourg	44
B6	Georgia	62
D5	Switzerland	60
C6	Azerbaijan	58
B5	Belarus	76
A6	Albania	68
C5	Austria	88
D6	Ireland	83

17th–20th place semifinals
B6	Georgia	76
D5	Switzerland	62
B5	Belarus	71
C5	Austria	86

17th place match
B6	Georgia	82
C5	Austria	86
19th place match
D5	Switzerland	98
B5	Belarus	88

=== 9th–16th place playoffs ===
13th place match
A3	Czech Republic	84
A4	Sweden	60
15th place match
C4	Romania	74
D4	Macedonia	61

13th–16th place semifinals
A3	Czech Republic	72
C4	Romania	66
A4	Sweden	80
D4	Macedonia	67

9th–16th place quarterfinals
A3	Czech Republic	71
B4	Hungary	73
D3	Belgium	82
C4	Romania	77
B3	Iceland	71
A4	Sweden	63
C3	Portugal	72
D4	Macedonia	69

9th–12th place semifinals
B4	Hungary	54
D3	Belgium	72
B3	Iceland	65
C3	Portugal	56

9th place match
D3	Belgium	87
B3	Iceland	78
11th place match
B4	Hungary	65
C3	Portugal	71

=== Championship playoffs ===
Fifth place
C2	Poland	76
A2	Netherlands	68
Seventh place
B2	Bulgaria	76
D2	Denmark	51

Consolation semifinals
B2	Bulgaria	77
C2	Poland	82
A2	Netherlands	95
D2	Denmark	59

Quarterfinals
A1	Great Britain	76
B2	Bulgaria	73
D1	Estonia	68
C2	Poland	63
B1	Croatia	65
A2	Netherlands	54
C1	Israel	78
D2	Denmark	55

Semifinals
A1	Great Britain	75
D1	Estonia	61
B1	Croatia	75
C1	Israel	69

Final
A1	Great Britain	84
B1	Croatia	90
Third place
D1	Estonia	90
C1	Israel	71

== Final standings ==
Rank	Team
1st place, gold medalist(s)	Croatia
2nd place, silver medalist(s)	Great Britain
3rd place, bronze medalist(s)	Estonia
4	Israel
5	Poland
6	Netherlands
7	Bulgaria
8	Denmark
9	Belgium
10	Iceland
11	Portugal
12	Hungary
13	Czech Republic
14	Sweden
15	Romania
16	Macedonia
17	Austria
18	Georgia
19	Switzerland
20	Belarus
21	Albania
22	Azerbaijan
23	Luxembourg
24	Ireland

Promoted to the 2018 FIBA U18 European Championship Division A
Relegated to the 2018 FIBA U18 European Championship Division C

== Awards ==
Most Valuable Player
(Croatia) Luka Šamanić

All-Tournament Team

- (United Kingdom) Jaydon Kayne Henry McCalla
- (Israel) Amit Ebo
- (Bulgaria) Ivan Alipiev
- (Croatia) Luka Šamanić
- (Estonia) Matthias Tass
