= Czech Republic men's national under-18 basketball team =

Czech Republic
- FIBA zone: FIBA Europe
- National federation: Czech Basketball Federation

U19 World Cup
- Appearances: 1
- Medals: None

U18 EuroBasket
- Appearances: 7
- Medals: None

U18 EuroBasket Division B
- Appearances: 13
- Medals: Gold: 1 (2010); Silver: 2 (2008, 2012); Bronze: 1 (2019)
Home	Away

The Czech Republic men's national under-18 and under-19 basketball team is a national basketball team of the Czech Republic, administered by the Czech Basketball Federation. It represents the country in international under-18 and under-19 men's basketball competitions.

== FIBA U18 EuroBasket participations ==
Year	Division A	Division B
2005		15th
2006		10th
2007		6th
2008		2nd place, silver medalist(s)
2009	16th	
2010		1st place, gold medalist(s)
2011	15th	
2012		2nd place, silver medalist(s)
2013	12th	
2014	13th	

Year	Division A	Division B
2015	16th	
2016		8th
2017		13th
2018		5th
2019		3rd place, bronze medalist(s)
2022	10th	
2023	16th	
2024		8th
2025		13th
2026		4th

== FIBA Under-19 Basketball World Cup participations ==
Year	Result
2013	14th
2027	Hosts

== See also ==
- Czech Republic men's national basketball team
- Czech Republic men's national under-17 basketball team
- Czech Republic women's national under-19 basketball team
