= 1984 FIBA Europe Under-18 Championship =

International basketball competition

1984 EuroBasket Under-18
11th FIBA Europe Under-18 Championship

Tournament details
- Host country: Sweden
- Teams: 12

Final positions
- Champions: Soviet Union (8th title)

The 1984 FIBA Europe Under-18 Championship was an international basketball competition held in Sweden in 1984.

== Final ranking ==
1. Soviet Union
2. Italy
3. Yugoslavia
4. Spain
5. West Germany
6. Czechoslovakia
7. Finland
8. Turkey
9. Greece
10. Bulgaria
11. Poland
12. Sweden

== Awards ==
Winners
Soviet Union
