= 2014 FIBA Europe Under-18 Championship Division B =

- 2014 FIBA Europe Under-18 Championship Division B

Tournament details
- Host country: Bulgaria
- Teams: 22

Final positions
- Champions: Germany (1st title)

Official website
- www.fibaeurope.com

The 2014 FIBA Europe Under-18 Championship Division B was an international basketball competition held in Bulgaria in 2014.

== Final ranking ==
1. Germany
2. Ukraine
3. Finland
4. Sweden
5. Slovenia
6. Israel
7. Portugal
8. Hungary
9. Iceland
10. Norway
11. Luxembourg
12. Denmark
13. Netherlands
14. Bulgaria
15. Macedonia
16. Austria
17. Estonia
18. Romania
19. Scotland
20. Georgia
21. Switzerland
22. Ireland

== Awards ==
Winners
Germany
