= 1982 FIBA Europe Under-18 Championship =

International basketball competition

1982 EuroBasket Under-18
10th FIBA Europe Under-18 Championship

Tournament details
- Host country: Bulgaria
- Teams: 12

Final positions
- Champions: Soviet Union (7th title)

The 1982 FIBA Europe Under-18 Championship was an international basketball competition held in Bulgaria in 1982.

== Final ranking ==
1. Soviet Union
2. Yugoslavia
3. Bulgaria
4. Italy
5. West Germany
6. Spain
7. Czechoslovakia
8. Finland
9. Israel
10. France
11. Hungary
12. Norway

== Awards ==
Winners
Soviet Union
