= 2025 FIBA U18 EuroBasket =

International youth basketball tournament

Европско првенство у кошарци за играче до 18 година 2025.

Tournament details
- Host country: Serbia
- City: Belgrade
- Dates: 26 July – 3 August 2025
- Teams: 16 (from 1 confederation)
- Venue: 2 (in 1 host city)

Final positions
- Champions: Spain (6th title)
- Runners-up: France
- Third place: Italy
- Fourth place: Latvia

Official website
- www.fiba.basketball

The 2025 FIBA U18 EuroBasket was the 40th edition of the European basketball championship for men's under-18 national teams. The tournament was played in Belgrade, Serbia, from 26 July to 3 August 2025.

== Participating teams ==
- Austria ▲ (Runners-up, 2024 FIBA U18 EuroBasket Division B)
- Belgium
- Bulgaria ▲ (Third place, 2024 FIBA U18 EuroBasket Division B)
- France
- Germany
- Greece
- Israel
- Italy
- Latvia
- Lithuania
- North Macedonia ▲ (Winners, 2024 FIBA U18 EuroBasket Division B)
- Serbia
- Slovenia
- Spain
- Sweden
- Turkey

== First round ==
The draw of the first round was held on 28 January 2025 in Freising, Germany.

In the first round, the teams were drawn into four groups of four. All teams advanced to the playoffs.

All times are local (Central European Summer Time; UTC+2).

=== Group A ===
Pos	Team	Pld	W	L	PF	PA	PD	Pts
1	Italy	3	3	0	257	176	+81	6
2	Germany	3	1	2	228	226	+2	4
3	Israel	3	1	2	190	225	−35	4
4	Bulgaria	3	1	2	203	251	−48	4

Source: FIBA

26 July 2025
18:30

Boxscore

Italy	85–71	Germany
Scoring by quarter: 20–18, 29–17, 17–18, 19–18
Pts: Accorsi 21; Rebs: Garavaglia 7 Asts: Ceccato 5		Pts: Grujicic 23; Rebs: Grujicic 8 Asts: Lastring 3

Belgrade Arena 2
Attendance: 160
Referees: Nicolas Maestre (FRA), Joseph Hodgson (GBR), Aleksandar Radonjic (AUT)

26 July 2025
21:00

Boxscore

Israel	80–67	Bulgaria
Scoring by quarter: 18–14, 11–16, 21–20, 30–17
Pts: Streit 17; Rebs: Keller 8 Asts: Keller 5		Pts: Hinkov 16; Rebs: three players 7 Asts: Balkandzhiev 3

Belgrade Arena 2
Attendance: 100
Referees: Edgard Ceccarelli (FRA), Ali Sakaci (TUR), Bilal Bardaqji (SWE)

27 July 2025
16:00

Boxscore

Germany	77–56	Israel
Scoring by quarter: 14–9, 28–14, 17–18, 18–15
Pts: Grujicic 23; Rebs: Lastring 16; Asts: three players 4		Pts: Faran Frenkel 10; Rebs: three players 6 Asts: Azriel 6

Belgrade Arena
Attendance: 400
Referees: Petar Pešić (SRB), Kirile Tvauri (GEO), Janis Rozenbergs (LAT)

27 July 2025
21:00

Boxscore

Bulgaria	51–91	Italy
Scoring by quarter: 15–23, 19–27, 11–23, 6–18
Pts: Hinkov 11; Rebs: Kamenski 8 Asts: Skrinski 4		Pts: Garavaglia 15; Rebs: Garavaglia 8 Asts: Lonati 6

Belgrade Arena
Attendance: 250
Referees: Gintaras Maciulis (LTU), Domen Krajnc (SLO), Alakbar Hasanov (AZE)

28 July 2025
16:00

Boxscore

Israel	54–81	Italy
Scoring by quarter: 13–19, 10–17, 10–30, 21–15
Pts: Rachlin, Keller 10; Rebs: Artmenko 8 Asts: Keller, Azriel 3		Pts: Garavaglia 13; Rebs: Garavaglia 9 Asts: Ceccato 6

Belgrade Arena 2
Attendance: 130
Referees: Igor Mitrovski (MKD), Ioannis Tsibouris (GRE), Joseph Hodgson (GBR)

28 July 2025
18:30

Boxscore

Germany	80–85	Bulgaria
Scoring by quarter: 20–26, 27–11, 25–22, 8–26
Pts: Grujicic 21; Rebs: Grujicic, Lastring 9 Asts: three players 3		Pts: Hinkov 19; Rebs: Balkandzhiev 5 Asts: Skrinski 6

Belgrade Arena 2
Attendance: 131
Referees: Sergii Zashchuk (UKR), Arnau Padros (ESP), Nikolaos Tziopanos (GRE)

=== Group B ===
Pos	Team	Pld	W	L	PF	PA	PD	Pts
1	France	3	3	0	270	154	+116	6
2	Turkey	3	2	1	230	204	+26	5
3	Sweden	3	1	2	184	260	−76	4
4	Austria	3	0	3	206	272	−66	3

Source: FIBA

26 July 2025
13:30

Boxscore

Sweden	43–94	France
Scoring by quarter: 13–23, 8–22, 12–21, 10–28
Pts: Novakovic 13; Rebs: Dumon 5 Asts: Mollermark 3		Pts: Boulefaa 19; Rebs: Trefle 6 Asts: Lemoine, Guedegbe 6

Belgrade Arena 2
Attendance: 80
Referees: Lukasz Jankowski (POL), Andrea Bongiorni (ITA), Or Zror (ISR)

26 July 2025
16:00

Boxscore

Turkey	92–67	Austria
Scoring by quarter: 26–18, 23–24, 18–16, 26–9
Pts: Onat 23; Rebs: Kara, Turkoglu 11; Asts: Coskun, Onat 5		Pts: Strobl 11; Rebs: Kircher 9 Asts: Sauer 5

Belgrade Arena 2
Attendance: 120
Referees: Michal Proc (POL), Kirile Tvauri (GEO), Vladimir Zanev (BUL)

27 July 2025
13:30

Boxscore

Austria	83–85	Sweden
Scoring by quarter: 25–24, 14–18, 21–18, 23–25
Pts: Sauer 23; Rebs: Kircher 10; Asts: Chavez 8		Pts: Fadiga 25; Rebs: Vilic 7 Asts: Fadiga 7

Belgrade Arena
Attendance: 300
Referees: Arnau Padros (ESP), Nikolaos Tziopanos (GRE), Joseph Hodgson (GBR)

27 July 2025
21:00

Boxscore

France	81–55	Turkey
Scoring by quarter: 21–15, 11–20, 18–16, 31–4
Pts: Grasshoff 17; Rebs: Grasshoff 9 Asts: Lemoine 6		Pts: Coskun 14; Rebs: Gonul, Kocagozoglu 6 Asts: Kocagozoglu, Yildiz 3

Belgrade Arena 2
Attendance: 170
Referees: Igor Mitrovski (MKD), Ioannis Tsibouris (GRE), Rainis Värv (EST)

28 July 2025
16:00

Boxscore

Turkey	83–56	Sweden
Scoring by quarter: 27–15, 18–13, 17–11, 21–17
Pts: Coskun 15; Rebs: Turkoglu 6 Asts: Basaran 7		Pts: Novakovic 13; Rebs: Biose Edogiawerie 7 Asts: Karamouzis 5

Belgrade Arena
Attendance: 250
Referees: Petar Pešić (SRB), Domen Krajnc (SLO), Janis Rozenbergs (LAT)

28 July 2025
21:00

Boxscore

France	95–56	Austria
Scoring by quarter: 24–18, 25–14, 24–10, 22–14
Pts: Boulefaa 15; Rebs: Yimga 10; Asts: Guedegbe 6		Pts: Strobl, Cvetkova 12; Rebs: Kircher 6 Asts: Kress, Chavez 3

Belgrade Arena
Attendance: 250
Referees: Gintaras Maciulis (LTU), Lukasz Jankowski (POL), Alakbar Hasanov (AZE)

=== Group C ===
Pos	Team	Pld	W	L	PF	PA	PD	Pts
1	Lithuania	3	3	0	313	223	+90	6
2	Serbia	3	2	1	266	211	+55	5
3	Greece	3	1	2	226	238	−12	4
4	North Macedonia	3	0	3	176	309	−133	3

Source: FIBA

26 July 2025
16:00

Boxscore

Lithuania	137–62	North Macedonia
Scoring by quarter: 33–15, 26–15, 42–17, 36–15
Pts: Bubnys, Pocius 18; Rebs: Deniusas 11; Asts: Grunkis 8		Pts: Janichikj 21; Rebs: Malinikj 7 Asts: Stojanoski 2

Belgrade Arena
Attendance: 300
Referees: Arnau Padros (ESP), Duhan Köyiçi (TUR), Alakbar Hasanov (AZE)

26 July 2025
18:30

Boxscore

Greece	63–96	Serbia
Scoring by quarter: 19–23, 10–25, 20–24, 14–24
Pts: Lefas 14; Rebs: Ntapsis 6 Asts: Makaratzis, Kazamias 3		Pts: Bačko 21; Rebs: Obućina 8 Asts: Radović, Popović 4

Belgrade Arena
Attendance: 2500
Referees: Sergii Zashchuk (UKR), Domen Krajnc (SLO), Janis Rozenbergs (LAT)

27 July 2025
13:30

Boxscore

North Macedonia	55–83	Greece
Scoring by quarter: 13–27, 10–19, 21–20, 11–17
Pts: Danev 17; Rebs: Gjorgjevikj 8 Asts: Janichikj 6		Pts: Lefas 23; Rebs: Thomakos, Ntapsis 8 Asts: Makaratzis 8

Belgrade Arena 2
Attendance: 130
Referees: Lukasz Jankowski (POL), Andrea Bongiorni (ITA), Aleksandar Radonjic (AUT)

27 July 2025
18:30

Boxscore

Serbia	81–89	Lithuania
Scoring by quarter: 26–20, 14–15, 16–26, 25–28
Pts: Radović 26; Rebs: Srzentić 8 Asts: Radović 5		Pts: Buika 20; Rebs: Daubaris, Buika 8 Asts: Buika 9

Belgrade Arena
Attendance: 3000
Referees: Michal Proc (POL), Ali Sakaci (TUR), Bilal Bardaqji (SWE)

28 July 2025
18:30

Boxscore

Serbia	89–59	North Macedonia
Scoring by quarter: 24–8, 25–15, 18–21, 22–15
Pts: Ostojić 25; Rebs: Ostojić 14; Asts: Srzentić 6		Pts: Janichikj 19; Rebs: Gjorgjevikj 7 Asts: Gjorgjevikj 4

Belgrade Arena
Attendance: 1000
Referees: Edgard Ceccarelli (FRA), Rainis Värv (EST), Or Zror (ISR)

28 July 2025
21:00

Boxscore

Lithuania	87–80	Greece
Scoring by quarter: 22–20, 26–22, 20–24, 19–14
Pts: Butajevas 14; Rebs: Buika 9 Asts: Grunkis 5		Pts: Lefas 21; Rebs: Moutafis 6 Asts: Makaratzis 8

Belgrade Arena 2
Attendance: 151
Referees: Nicolas Maestre (FRA), Duhan Köyiçi (TUR), Vladimir Zanev (BUL)

=== Group D ===
Pos	Team	Pld	W	L	PF	PA	PD	Pts
1	Spain	3	3	0	288	192	+96	6
2	Slovenia	3	2	1	267	225	+42	5
3	Belgium	3	1	2	190	266	−76	4
4	Latvia	3	0	3	222	284	−62	3

Source: FIBA

26 July 2025
13:30

Boxscore

Belgium	52–105	Slovenia
Scoring by quarter: 19–20, 12–23, 10–30, 11–32
Pts: Hodge 17; Rebs: Hodge 7 Asts: Ona Embo 2		Pts: Joksimovic 19; Rebs: Grosic 7 Asts: Lazarevski, Jereb 5

Belgrade Arena
Attendance: 300
Referees: Gintaras Maciulis (LTU), Petar Pešić (SRB), Nikolaos Tziopanos (GRE)

26 July 2025
21:00

Boxscore

Spain	103–73	Latvia
Scoring by quarter: 29–21, 30–18, 25–19, 19–15
Pts: Niebla 22; Rebs: Niebla 9 Asts: Del Pino, Platteeuw 3		Pts: Pihtovs 15; Rebs: Pihtovs 6 Asts: Bergmanis 6

Belgrade Arena
Attendance: 326
Referees: Igor Mitrovski (MKD), Rainis Värv (EST), Ioannis Tsibouris (GRE)

27 July 2025
16:00

Boxscore

Latvia	73–88	Belgium
Scoring by quarter: 16–17, 13–22, 17–21, 27–28
Pts: Andzevs 13; Rebs: Pihtovs 13; Asts: Valters 4		Pts: Hodge 29; Rebs: Hodge 9 Asts: Waerniers 4

Belgrade Arena 2
Attendance: 70
Referees: Nicolas Maestre (FRA), Or Zror (ISR), Vladimir Zanev (BUL)

27 July 2025
18:30

Boxscore

Slovenia	69–97	Spain
Scoring by quarter: 17–30, 14–19, 16–29, 22–19
Pts: Joksimovic, Morano Mahmutovic 12; Rebs: Joksimovic 4 Asts: Jereb, Kroselj 3		Pts: Campoy 16; Rebs: Del Pino 6 Asts: Platteeuw 6

Belgrade Arena 2
Attendance: 240
Referees: Duhan Köyiçi (TUR), Sergii Zashchuk (UKR), Edgard Ceccarelli (FRA)

28 July 2025
13:30

Boxscore

Spain	88–50	Belgium
Scoring by quarter: 18–18, 18–13, 28–8, 24–11
Pts: Blanco 16; Rebs: Platteeuw 9 Asts: Huelves, Platteeuw 4		Pts: Hodge 11; Rebs: three players 3 Asts: T'Joncke 6

Belgrade Arena
Attendance: 250
Referees: Michal Proc (POL), Andrea Bongiorni (ITA), Aleksandar Radonjic (AUT)

28 July 2025
13:30

Boxscore

Slovenia	93–76	Latvia
Scoring by quarter: 39–16, 32–22, 10–13, 12–25
Pts: Morano Mahmutovic 31; Rebs: Joksimovic 8 Asts: Joksimovic 5		Pts: Talcis 18; Rebs: Rudusans, Pihtovs 6 Asts: Andzevs 5

Belgrade Arena 2
Attendance: 200
Referees: Ali Sakaci (TUR), Kirile Tvauri (GEO), Bilal Bardaqji (SWE)

== Playoff brackets ==
=== Main bracket ===
Round of 16
30 July
A1 Italy	101
B4 Austria	57
30 July
C2 Serbia	106
D3 Belgium	36
30 July
B2 Turkey	78
A3 Israel	67
30 July
D1 Spain	92
C4 North Macedonia	38
30 July
A2 Germany	89
B3 Sweden	62
30 July
C1 Lithuania	94
D4 Latvia	101
30 July
B1 France	76
A4 Bulgaria	72
30 July
D2 Slovenia	103
C3 Greece	72

Quarterfinals
31 July
A1 Italy	95
C2 Serbia	66
31 July
B2 Turkey	54
D1 Spain	77
31 July
A2 Germany	79
D4 Latvia	80
31 July
B1 France	80
D2 Slovenia	58

Semifinals
2 August
A1 Italy	62
D1 Spain	84
2 August
D4 Latvia	63
B1 France	92

Final
3 August
D1 Spain	82
B1 France	81
3rd place match
3 August
A1 Italy	86
D4 Latvia	68

=== 5th place bracket ===
5th–8th place semifinals
2 August
C2 Serbia	76
B2 Turkey	51
2 August
A2 Germany	78
D2 Slovenia	91

5th place match
3 August
C2 Serbia	74
D2 Slovenia	69
7th place match
3 August
B2 Turkey	64
A2 Germany	73

=== 9th place bracket ===
9th–16th place quarterfinals
31 July
B4 Austria	74
D3 Belgium	67
31 July
A3 Israel	85
C4 North Macedonia	73
31 July
B3 Sweden	72
C1 Lithuania	102
31 July
A4 Bulgaria	82
C3 Greece	93

9th–12th place semifinals
2 August
B4 Austria	86
A3 Israel	95
2 August
C1 Lithuania	90
C3 Greece	60

9th place match
3 August
A3 Israel	65
C1 Lithuania	106
11th place match
3 August
B4 Austria	78
C3 Greece	108

=== 13th place bracket ===
13th–16th place semifinals
2 August
D3 Belgium	72
C4 North Macedonia	81
2 August
B3 Sweden	59
A4 Bulgaria	80

13th place match
3 August
C4 North Macedonia	87
A4 Bulgaria	90
15th place match
3 August
D3 Belgium	85
B3 Sweden	78

== Playoff results ==
=== Round of 16 ===
30 July 2025
13:30

Boxscore

France	76–72	Bulgaria
Scoring by quarter: 20–22, 16–19, 20–11, 20–20
Pts: Faye 16; Rebs: Houindo 9 Asts: Lemoine 5		Pts: Skrinski 21; Rebs: Kamenski 12; Asts: Balkandzhiev 3

Belgrade Arena
Attendance: 174
Referees: Gintaras Maciulis (LTU), Alakbar Hasanov (AZE), Aleksandar Radonjic (AUT)

30 July 2025
13:30

Boxscore

Spain	92–38	North Macedonia
Scoring by quarter: 19–13, 23–7, 22–13, 28–5
Pts: Niebla 15; Rebs: Platteeuw 13; Asts: Del Pino, Blanco 4		Pts: Dimovski 13; Rebs: three players 4 Asts: Gjorgjevikj 5

Belgrade Arena 2
Attendance: 100
Referees: Lukasz Jankowski (POL), Vladimir Zanev (BUL), Joseph Hodgson (GBR)

30 July 2025
16:00

Boxscore

Turkey	78–67	Israel
Scoring by quarter: 22–14, 14–13, 24–21, 18–19
Pts: Coskun 29; Rebs: Turkoglu 10; Asts: Basaran 9		Pts: Keller 30; Rebs: Artmenko 8 Asts: Azriel 8

Belgrade Arena 2
Attendance: 180
Referees: Sergii Zashchuk (UKR), Edgard Ceccarelli (FRA), Kirile Tvauri (GEO)

30 July 2025
16:00

Boxscore

Slovenia	103–72	Greece
Scoring by quarter: 19–21, 22–18, 34–10, 28–23
Pts: Morano Mahmutovic 24; Rebs: Faganel 8 Asts: Grosic, Jereb 5		Pts: Lefas 16; Rebs: Sermpezis 6 Asts: Makaratzis 6

Belgrade Arena
Attendance: 250
Referees: Michal Proc (POL), Arnau Padros (ESP), Janis Rozenbergs (LAT)

30 July 2025
18:30

Boxscore

Lithuania	94–101	Latvia
Scoring by quarter: 24–27, 17–17, 21–21, 32–36
Pts: Buika 26; Rebs: Butajevas 11; Asts: Buika 5		Pts: Valters 26; Rebs: Kurucs 17; Asts: Valters 5

Belgrade Arena 2
Referees: Igor Mitrovski (MKD), Petar Pešić (SRB), Andrea Bongiorni (ITA)

30 July 2025
18:30

Boxscore

Serbia	106–36	Belgium
Scoring by quarter: 28-9, 30-6, 26-8, 22-13
Pts: Ostojić 18; Rebs: Ostojić 8 Asts: Radović 4		Pts: Pieters 12; Rebs: Pieters 5 Asts: Coppejans 2

Belgrade Arena
Attendance: 700
Referees: Nikolas Maestre(FRA), Nikolaos Tziopanos(GRE),Domen Krajnc(SLO)

30 July 2025
21:00

Boxscore

Italy	101–57	Austria
Scoring by quarter: 16–7, 25–16, 35–22, 25–12
Pts: Accorsi 19; Rebs: Garavaglia 12; Asts: Hassan 7		Pts: three players 8 Rebs: Dietz 10; Asts: Kress 4

Belgrade Arena
Referees: Duhan Köyiçi (TUR), Or Zror (ISR), Bilal Bardaqji (SWE)

30 July 2025
21:00

Boxscore

Germany	89–62	Sweden
Scoring by quarter: 18–17, 28–18, 25–12, 18–15
Pts: Lastring 20; Rebs: Grujicic 11; Asts: Grujicic 9		Pts: Novakovic 16; Rebs: Mollermark 12; Asts: Fadiga 4

Belgrade Arena 2
Referees: Ali Sakaci (TUR), Ioannis Tsibouris (GRE), Rainis Värv (EST)

=== 9th–16th place quarterfinals ===
31 July 2025
13:30

Boxscore

Israel	85–73	North Macedonia
Scoring by quarter: 26–16, 23–22, 22–22, 14–13
Pts: Artmenko 22; Rebs: Artmenko 16; Asts: Amiel 6		Pts: Danev 23; Rebs: Malinikj 9 Asts: Janichikj 5

Belgrade Arena 2
Attendance: 170
Referees: Gintaras Maciulis (LTU), Rainis Värv (EST), Bilal Bardaqji (SWE)

31 July 2025
16:00

Boxscore

Bulgaria	82–93	Greece
Scoring by quarter: 19–26, 23–24, 27–24, 13–19
Pts: Skrinski, Hinkov 18; Rebs: Hinkov 10; Asts: Skrinski 3		Pts: Lefas 33; Rebs: Makaratzis, Lefas 7 Asts: Makaratzis 11

Belgrade Arena 2
Attendance: 180
Referees: Petar Pešić (SRB), Duhan Köyici (TUR), Domen Krajnc (SLO)

31 July 2025
18:30

Boxscore

Sweden	72–102	Lithuania
Scoring by quarter: 16–27, 17–24, 12–18, 27–23
Pts: Novakovic 25; Rebs: four players 4 Asts: Fadiga, Odinks 2		Pts: Bulanovas 16; Rebs: three players 6 Asts: Buika 5

Belgrade Arena 2
Attendance: 50
Referees: Lukasz Jankowski (POL), Alakbar Hasanov (AZE), Or Zror (ISR)

31 July 2025
21:00

Boxscore

Austria	74–67	Belgium
Scoring by quarter: 21–23, 10–16, 23–11, 20–17
Pts: Benczak 18; Rebs: Dietz 10; Asts: Chavez 4		Pts: Ona Embo 24; Rebs: Waerniers 8 Asts: Waerniers 4

Belgrade Arena 2
Attendance: 30
Referees: Ali Sakaci (TUR), Kirile Tvauri (GEO), Vladimir Zanev (BUL)

=== 13th–16th place semifinals ===
2 August 2025
13:30

Boxscore

Sweden	59–80	Bulgaria
Scoring by quarter: 12–15, 16–22, 19–18, 12–25
Pts: Novakovic 15; Rebs: Kamara 10; Asts: Mollermark 3		Pts: Hinkov 26; Rebs: Kamenski 10; Asts: Popov 7

Belgrade Arena 2
Attendance: 45
Referees: Michal Proc (POL), Nikolaos Tziopanos (GRE), Aleksandar Radonjic (AUT)

2 August 2025
16:00

Boxscore

Belgium	72–81	North Macedonia
Scoring by quarter: 20–17, 16–26, 18–11, 18–27
Pts: Ona Embo 25; Rebs: Waerniers 12; Asts: Ona Embo 4		Pts: Gjorgjevikj 22; Rebs: Danev 9 Asts: Gjorgjevikj, Janichikj 7

Belgrade Arena 2
Attendance: 140
Referees: Duhan Köyiçi (TUR), Domen Krajnc (SLO), Joseph Hodgson (GBR)

=== 15th place match ===
3 August 2025
11:00

Boxscore

Belgium	85–78	Sweden
Scoring by quarter: 19–18, 11–23, 29–20, 26–17
Pts: T'Joncke, Waerniers 18; Rebs: Waerniers 7 Asts: T'Joncke 9		Pts: Novakovic 17; Rebs: Kamara 8 Asts: Lidberg 6

Belgrade Arena 2
Attendance: 50
Referees: Duhan Köyiçi (TUR), Rainis Värv (EST), Or Zror (ISR)

=== 13th place match ===
3 August 2025
16:00

Boxscore

North Macedonia	87–90	Bulgaria
Scoring by quarter: 25–22, 16–22, 25–23, 21–23
Pts: Dimovki 29; Rebs: Gjorgjevikj 8 Asts: Gjorgjevikj 10		Pts: Hinkov 32; Rebs: Hinkov 11; Asts: Skrinski 6

Belgrade Arena 2
Attendance: 200
Referees: Arnau Padros (ESP),Domen Krajnc (SLO), Kirile Tvauri (GEO)

=== 9th–12th place semifinals ===
2 August 2025
18:30

Boxscore

Lithuania	90–60	Greece
Scoring by quarter: 25–21, 19–16, 22–11, 24–22
Pts: Butajevas 25; Rebs: Butajevas 16; Asts: Buika, Liutkevicius 5		Pts: Ntapsis 13; Rebs: Sekertzis 6 Asts: three players 2

Belgrade Arena 2
Attendance: 85
Referees: Petar Pešić (SRB), Janis Rozenbergs (LAT), Alakbar Hasanov (AZE)

2 August 2025
21:00

Boxscore

Austria	86–95	Israel
Scoring by quarter: 15–23, 22–27, 19–28, 30–17
Pts: Strobl 22; Rebs: Kircher 9 Asts: Kapic 4		Pts: Faran Frenkel 22; Rebs: Musis 8 Asts: Amiel 7

Belgrade Arena 2
Attendance: 90
Referees: Ali Sakaci (TUR), Kirile Tvauri (GEO), Bilal Bardaqji (SWE)

=== 11th place match ===
3 August 2025
13:30

Boxscore

Austria	78–108	Greece
Scoring by quarter: 29–30, 12–18, 17–34, 20–26
Pts: Sauer 16; Rebs: Muhr 6 Asts: Chavez 4		Pts: Lefas 21; Rebs: Alexandropoulos 7 Asts: Makaratzis 9

Belgrade Arena 2
Attendance: 40
Referees: Edgard Ceccarelli (FRA), Vladimir Zanev (BUL), Joseph Hodgson (GBR)

=== 9th place match ===
3 August 2025
16:00

Boxscore

Israel	65–106	Lithuania
Scoring by quarter: 14–27, 20–26, 20–24, 11–29
Pts: Artmenko 12; Rebs: Musis 7 Asts: Amiel 5		Pts: Daubaris 24; Rebs: Butajevas 13; Asts: Liutkevicius 6

Belgrade Arena 2
Attendance: 75
Referees: Igor Mitrovski (MKD), Aleksandar Radonjic (AUT), Alakbar Hasanov (AZE)

=== Championship quarterfinals ===
31 July 2025
13:30

Boxscore

France	80–58	Slovenia
Scoring by quarter: 25–13, 22–14, 14–16, 19–15
Pts: Lemoine 17; Rebs: Houindo 7 Asts: Lemoine 6		Pts: Morano Mahmutovic 19; Rebs: Joksimovic, Morano Mahmutovic 5 Asts: Grosic 5

Belgrade Arena
Attendance: 200
Referees: Igor Mitrovski (MKD), Andrea Bongiorni (ITA), Nikolaos Tziopanos (GRE)

31 July 2025
16:00

Boxscore

Turkey	54–77	Spain
Scoring by quarter: 9–12, 12–22, 12–25, 21–18
Pts: Basaran 14; Rebs: Gonul 8 Asts: Basaran 7		Pts: three players 12; Rebs: Campoy, Niebla 8 Asts: Villar 5

Belgrade Arena
Attendance: 250
Referees: Nicolas Maestre (FRA), Janis Rozenbergs (LAT), Aleksandar Radonjic (AUT)

31 July 2025
18:30

Boxscore

Italy	95–66	Serbia
Scoring by quarter: 19–19, 25–19, 18–11, 33–17
Pts: Garavaglia 24; Rebs: Acunzo 11; Asts: Hassan 5		Pts: Bačko 19; Rebs: Šekularac 7 Asts: Lučić 4

Belgrade Arena
Attendance: 3,000
Referees: Michal Proc (POL), Edgard Ceccarelli (FRA), Ioannis Tsibouris (GRE)

31 July 2025
21:00

Boxscore

Germany	79–80	Latvia
Scoring by quarter: 18–25, 26–12, 17–20, 18–23
Pts: Grujicic 31; Rebs: Lastring 10; Asts: Grujicic, Lastring 5		Pts: Pihtovs, Valters 18; Rebs: Pihtovs 8 Asts: Valters 6

Belgrade Arena
Attendance: 150
Referees: Sergii Zashchuk (UKR), Arnau Padros (ESP), Joseph Hodgson (GBR)

=== 5th–8th place semifinals ===
2 August 2025
13:30

Boxscore

Germany	78–91	Slovenia
Scoring by quarter: 18–28, 12–21, 21–24, 27–18
Pts: Scheffs 16; Rebs: Biel, Grujicic 7 Asts: Edoka, Ilic 3		Pts: Morano Mahmutovic 24; Rebs: Grosic 6 Asts: Lazarevski 6

Belgrade Arena
Attendance: 200
Referees: Edgard Ceccarelli (FRA), Kirile Tvauri (GEO), Or Zror (ISR)

2 August 2025
16:00

Boxscore

Serbia	76–51	Turkey
Scoring by quarter: 19–16, 17–10, 23–11, 17–14
Pts: Lučić 13; Rebs: Srzentić 6 Asts: Lučić, Popović 3		Pts: Kara, Gonul 10; Rebs: Elezay, Gonul 7 Asts: Yildiz 5

Belgrade Arena
Attendance: 750
Referees: Arnau Padros (ESP), Andrea Bongiorni (ITA), Vladimir Zanev (BUL)

=== 7th place match ===
3 August 2025
18:30

Boxscore

Turkey	64–73	Germany
Scoring by quarter: 16–15, 11–24, 25–16, 12–18
Pts: Basaran 16; Rebs: Alyanak 9 Asts: Basaran 6		Pts: Grujicic 36; Rebs: Grujicic 11; Asts: Bruggemann 4

Belgrade Arena
Attendance: 50
Referees: Lukasz Jankowski (POL), Rainis Värv (EST), Bilal Bardaqji (SWE)

=== 5th place match ===
3 August 2025
13:30

Boxscore

Serbia	74–69	Slovenia
Scoring by quarter: 17–24, 26–19, 14–5, 17–21
Pts: Lučić 20; Rebs: Bačko 10; Asts: Obućina, Popović 2		Pts: Grosic 18; Rebs: Faganel 6 Asts: three players 3

Belgrade Arena
Attendance: 250
Referees: Ali Sakaci (TUR), Andrea Bongiorni (ITA), Ioannis Tsibouris (GRE)

=== Championship semifinals ===
2 August 2025
18:30

Boxscore

Latvia	63–92	France
Scoring by quarter: 19–19, 15–34, 21–20, 8–19
Pts: Andzevs 18; Rebs: three players 6 Asts: Kurucs, Valters 2		Pts: Lemoine 31; Rebs: Boulefaa 8 Asts: Grasshoff 7

Belgrade Arena
Attendance: 250
Referees: Sergii Zashchuk (UKR), Lukasz Jankowski (POL), Ioannis Tsibouris (GRE)

2 August 2025
21:00

Boxscore

Italy	62–84	Spain
Scoring by quarter: 25–16, 11–18, 13–26, 13–24
Pts: Hassan 22; Rebs: Acunzo 13; Asts: Acunzo, Lonati 4		Pts: Villar 20; Rebs: Platteeuw 10; Asts: Del Castillo 3

Belgrade Arena
Attendance: 250
Referees: Igor Mitrovski (MKD), Gintaras Maciulis (LTU), Rainis Värv (EST)

=== 3rd place match ===
3 August 2025
18:30

Boxscore

Italy	86–68	Latvia
Scoring by quarter: 24–17, 23–21, 16–17, 23–13
Pts: Lonati 27; Rebs: Baiocchi 7 Asts: Baiocchi 5		Pts: Andzevs 13; Rebs: Kurucs 12; Asts: Andzevs 8

Belgrade Arena
Attendance: 1,200
Referees: Michal Proc (POL), Petar Pešić (SRB), Nikolaos Tziopanos (GRE)

=== Final ===
3 August 2025
21:00

Boxscore

Spain	82–81	France
Scoring by quarter: 25–22, 14–17, 14–25, 29–17
Pts: Del Pino 23; Rebs: Platteeuw 6 Asts: Villar 4		Pts: Boulefaa 19; Rebs: Yimga 9 Asts: Guedegbe 8

Belgrade Arena
Attendance: 1,200
Referees: Sergii Zashchuk (UKR), Gintaras Maciulis (LTU), Janis Rozenbergs (LAT)

== Final standings ==
Rank	Team
1st place, gold medalist(s)	Spain
2nd place, silver medalist(s)	France
3rd place, bronze medalist(s)	Italy
4	Latvia
5	Serbia
6	Slovenia
7	Germany
8	Turkey
9	Lithuania
10	Israel
11	Greece
12	Austria
13	Bulgaria
14	North Macedonia
15	Belgium
16	Sweden

Relegated to the 2026 FIBA U18 EuroBasket Division B

== Awards ==
2025 FIBA U18 EuroBasket
winners

Spain
Sixth title

Most Valuable Player
(Spain) Ian Platteeuw

All-Tournament Team

- PG – (France) Maxence Lemoine
- SG – (Latvia) Valdis Valters
- SF – (Italy) Diego Caravaglia
- PF – (Serbia) Pavle Bačko
- C – (Spain) Ian Platteeuw – (MVP)
