= Romania men's national under-19 basketball team =

Romania
- FIBA zone: FIBA Europe
- National federation: Federatia Română de Baschet

U19 World Cup
- Appearances: 1 (1991)
- Medals: None

U18 EuroBasket
- Appearances: 5
- Medals: None

U18 EuroBasket Division B
- Appearances: 19
- Medals: Gold: 1 (2006)
Home	Away

The Romania men's national under-18 and under-19 basketball team is a national basketball team of Romania, administered by the Romanian Basketball Federation. It represents the country in international under-18 and under-19 men's basketball competitions.

== FIBA U18 EuroBasket participations ==
Year	Division A	Division B
1970	9th	
1978	11th	
1990	4th	
1996	11th	
2005		17th
2006		1st place, gold medalist(s)
2007	16th	
2008		12th
2009		20th
2010		20th
2011		11th
2012		15th

Year	Division A	Division B
2013		16th
2014		18th
2015		16th
2016		20th
2017		15th
2018		23rd
2019		21st
2022		7th
2023		7th
2024		14th
2025		4th
2026		6th

== FIBA Under-19 Basketball World Cup participations ==
Year	Result
1991	5th

== See also ==
- Romania men's national basketball team
- Romania men's national under-16 basketball team
- Romania women's national under-18 basketball team
