= 2026 FIBA U18 EuroBasket Division B =

International youth basketball tournament

Tournament details
- Host country: Croatia
- Cities: Rijeka; Opatija
- Dates: 24 July – 2 August 2026
- Teams: 22 (from 1 confederation)
- Venues: 2 (in 2 host cities)

Final positions
- Champions: Netherlands (2nd title)
- Runners-up: Poland
- Third place: Belgium
- Fourth place: Czechia

Tournament statistics
- MVP: (Netherlands) Tayshawn Gipson

Official website
- www.fiba.basketball

The 2026 FIBA U18 EuroBasket Division B was the 20th edition of the Division B of the European basketball championship for men's under-18 national teams. The tournament was played in Rijeka and Opatija, Croatia, from 24 July to 2 August 2026.

Netherlands secured their second overall Division B title with a victory over Poland in the final, 71–57.

== Participating teams ==
- Azerbaijan
- Belgium ▼ (15th place, 2025 FIBA U18 EuroBasket Division A)
- Bosnia and Herzegovina
- Croatia
- Cyprus ▲ (Winners, 2025 FIBA U18 EuroBasket Division C)
- Czech Republic
- Finland
- Georgia
- Great Britain
- Hungary
- Iceland
- Ireland
- North Macedonia ▼ (14th place, 2025 FIBA U18 EuroBasket Division A)
- Montenegro
- Netherlands
- Norway
- Poland
- Portugal
- Romania
- Switzerland
- Sweden ▼ (16th place, 2025 FIBA U18 EuroBasket Division A)
- Ukraine

== First round ==
The draw of the first round was held on 5 February 2026 in Freising, Germany.

In the first round, the teams were drawn into four groups. The first two teams from each group advanced to the quarterfinals; the third and fourth teams advanced to the 9th–16th place playoffs; the other teams were dropped to the 17th–22nd place classification.

All times are local (Central European Summer Time; UTC+2).

=== Group A ===
Pos	Team	Pld	W	L	PF	PA	PD	Pts	Qualification
1	Croatia (H)	4	4	0	350	283	+67	8	Quarterfinals
2	Romania	4	3	1	337	311	+26	7	Quarterfinals
3	Montenegro	4	2	2	291	280	+11	6	9th–16th place playoffs
4	Switzerland	4	1	3	300	284	+16	5	9th–16th place playoffs
5	Norway	4	0	4	239	359	−120	4	17th–22nd place classification

Source: FIBA
(H) Hosts

24 July 2026
10:30

Boxscore

Switzerland	64–71	Romania
Scoring by quarter: 19–15, 16–21, 19–24, 10–11

Centar Zamet, Rijeka

24 July 2026
13:00

Boxscore

Norway	52–74	Montenegro
Scoring by quarter: 16–15, 8–23, 18–13, 10–23

Centar Zamet, Rijeka

25 July 2026
15:30

Boxscore

Croatia	107–60	Norway
Scoring by quarter: 26–9, 30–15, 24–22, 27–14

Centar Zamet, Rijeka

25 July 2026
15:30

Boxscore

Montenegro	64–62	Switzerland
Scoring by quarter: 13–12, 13–19, 15–15, 23–16

Dvorana Marino Cvetković, Opatija

26 July 2026
15:30

Boxscore

Romania	98–94 (OT)	Montenegro
Scoring by quarter: 23–23, 14–22, 28–24, 22–18, Overtime: 11–7

Centar Zamet, Rijeka

26 July 2026
18:00

Boxscore

Switzerland	81–87	Croatia
Scoring by quarter: 19–17, 16–28, 16–19, 30–23

Centar Zamet, Rijeka

28 July 2026
13:00

Boxscore

Norway	62–93	Switzerland
Scoring by quarter: 19–27, 19–25, 12–23, 12–18

Dvorana Marino Cvetković, Opatija
Attendance: 50

28 July 2026
18:00

Boxscore

Croatia	88–83	Romania
Scoring by quarter: 20–19, 24–25, 20–19, 24–20

Centar Zamet, Rijeka
Attendance: 240

29 July 2026
10:30

Boxscore

Romania	85–65	Norway
Scoring by quarter: 23–18, 21–16, 22–13, 19–18

Dvorana Marino Cvetković, Opatija
Attendance: 50

29 July 2026
20:30

Boxscore

Montenegro	59–68	Croatia
Scoring by quarter: 15–17, 17–13, 8–18, 19–20

Centar Zamet, Rijeka
Attendance: 250

=== Group B ===
Pos	Team	Pld	W	L	PF	PA	PD	Pts	Qualification
1	Czech Republic	5	5	0	396	267	+129	10	Quarterfinals
2	Poland	5	4	1	359	314	+45	9	Quarterfinals
3	Iceland	5	3	2	390	374	+16	8	9th–16th place playoffs
4	Azerbaijan	5	2	3	291	357	−66	7	9th–16th place playoffs
5	Portugal	5	1	4	320	368	−48	6	17th–22nd place classification
6	Ukraine	5	0	5	309	385	−76	5	17th–22nd place classification

Source: FIBA

24 July 2026
15:30

Boxscore

Azerbaijan	60–70	Poland
Scoring by quarter: 8–13, 9–31, 14–17, 29–9

Centar Zamet, Rijeka

24 July 2026
18:00

Boxscore

Portugal	68–87	Iceland
Scoring by quarter: 17–21, 22–22, 17–26, 12–18

Centar Zamet, Rijeka

24 July 2026
20:30

Boxscore

Czech Republic	81–51	Ukraine
Scoring by quarter: 26–10, 17–10, 19–10, 19–21

Centar Zamet, Rijeka

25 July 2026
13:00

Boxscore

Ukraine	68–77	Azerbaijan
Scoring by quarter: 27–19, 12–15, 9–28, 20–15

Dvorana Marino Cvetković, Opatija

25 July 2026
18:00

Boxscore

Iceland	57–88	Czech Republic
Scoring by quarter: 24–22, 7–26, 11–22, 15–18

Dvorana Marino Cvetković, Opatija

25 July 2026
20:30

Boxscore

Poland	78–58	Portugal
Scoring by quarter: 18–21, 16–9, 27–12, 17–16

Dvorana Marino Cvetković, Opatija

26 July 2026
10:30

Boxscore

Azerbaijan	56–95	Iceland
Scoring by quarter: 18–26, 15–17, 15–26, 8–26

Centar Zamet, Rijeka

26 July 2026
13:00

Boxscore

Czech Republic	83–53	Portugal
Scoring by quarter: 27–15, 17–8, 18–16, 21–14

Dvorana Marino Cvetković, Opatija

26 July 2026
15:30

Boxscore

Ukraine	55–56	Poland
Scoring by quarter: 21–8, 8–21, 5–19, 21–8

Dvorana Marino Cvetković, Opatija

28 July 2026
10:30

Boxscore

Portugal	50–52	Azerbaijan
Scoring by quarter: 9–14, 17–8, 11–9, 13–21

Centar Zamet, Rijeka
Attendance: 30

28 July 2026
13:00

Boxscore

Poland	60–70	Czech Republic
Scoring by quarter: 24–16, 15–16, 6–27, 15–11

Centar Zamet, Rijeka
Attendance: 70

28 July 2026
20:30

Boxscore

Iceland	80–67	Ukraine
Scoring by quarter: 17–20, 22–8, 18–15, 23–24

Centar Zamet, Rijeka
Attendance: 50

29 July 2026
13:00

Boxscore

Iceland	71–95	Poland
Scoring by quarter: 16–19, 13–33, 25–24, 17–19

Dvorana Marino Cvetković, Opatija
Attendance: 100

29 July 2026
15:30

Boxscore

Ukraine	68–91	Portugal
Scoring by quarter: 14–19, 10–23, 22–24, 22–25

Centar Zamet, Rijeka
Attendance: 40

29 July 2026
18:00

Boxscore

Azerbaijan	46–74	Czech Republic
Scoring by quarter: 7–25, 14–13, 11–20, 14–16

Dvorana Marino Cvetković, Opatija
Attendance: 50

=== Group C ===
Pos	Team	Pld	W	L	PF	PA	PD	Pts	Qualification
1	Netherlands	5	5	0	414	314	+100	10	Quarterfinals
2	Belgium	5	4	1	436	351	+85	9	Quarterfinals
3	Finland	5	2	3	339	355	−16	7	9th–16th place playoffs
4	Great Britain	5	2	3	327	355	−28	7	9th–16th place playoffs
5	Ireland	5	2	3	351	383	−32	7	17th–22nd place classification
6	Cyprus	5	0	5	327	436	−109	5	17th–22nd place classification

Source: FIBA

24 July 2026
10:30

Boxscore

Cyprus	74–122	Belgium
Scoring by quarter: 27–30, 11–35, 17–24, 19–33

Dvorana Marino Cvetković, Opatija

24 July 2026
13:00

Boxscore

Netherlands	69–43	Great Britain
Scoring by quarter: 18–7, 9–19, 21–11, 21–6

Dvorana Marino Cvetković, Opatija

24 July 2026
15:30

Boxscore

Finland	76–78	Ireland
Scoring by quarter: 26–17, 13–15, 20–20, 17–26

Dvorana Marino Cvetković, Opatija

25 July 2026
10:30

Boxscore

Ireland	80–60	Cyprus
Scoring by quarter: 20–14, 22–15, 14–20, 24–11

Dvorana Marino Cvetković, Opatija

25 July 2026
10:30

Boxscore

Great Britain	63–72	Finland
Scoring by quarter: 15–17, 15–26, 9–14, 24–15

Centar Zamet, Rijeka

25 July 2026
20:30

Boxscore

Belgium	77–86	Netherlands
Scoring by quarter: 14–20, 14–24, 23–18, 26–24

Centar Zamet, Rijeka

26 July 2026
13:00

Boxscore

Ireland	63–88	Belgium
Scoring by quarter: 25–21, 17–23, 8–27, 13–17

Centar Zamet, Rijeka

26 July 2026
18:00

Boxscore

Finland	70–80	Netherlands
Scoring by quarter: 16–17, 24–22, 15–19, 15–22

Dvorana Marino Cvetković, Opatija

26 July 2026
20:30

Boxscore

Cyprus	73–78	Great Britain
Scoring by quarter: 17–19, 22–14, 15–12, 19–33

Centar Zamet, Rijeka

28 July 2026
15:30

Boxscore

Belgium	71–55	Finland
Scoring by quarter: 24–23, 23–13, 13–7, 11–12

Dvorana Marino Cvetković, Opatija
Attendance: 50

28 July 2026
15:30

Boxscore

Netherlands	90–57	Cyprus
Scoring by quarter: 30–10, 16–12, 25–20, 19–15

Centar Zamet, Rijeka
Attendance: 50

28 July 2026
18:00

Boxscore

Great Britain	70–63	Ireland
Scoring by quarter: 25–9, 19–14, 10–21, 16–19

Dvorana Marino Cvetković, Opatija
Attendance: 50

29 July 2026
13:00

Boxscore

Cyprus	63–66	Finland
Scoring by quarter: 17–13, 12–19, 17–19, 17–15

Centar Zamet, Rijeka
Attendance: 30

29 July 2026
15:30

Boxscore

Great Britain	73–78	Belgium
Scoring by quarter: 23–24, 13–23, 12–19, 25–12

Dvorana Marino Cvetković, Opatija
Attendance: 100

29 July 2026
20:30

Boxscore

Ireland	67–89	Netherlands
Scoring by quarter: 17–26, 23–19, 13–24, 14–20

Dvorana Marino Cvetković, Opatija
Attendance: 50

=== Group D ===
Pos	Team	Pld	W	L	PF	PA	PD	Pts	Qualification
1	Hungary	4	4	0	326	262	+64	8	Quarterfinals
2	Georgia	4	3	1	298	265	+33	7	Quarterfinals
3	Bosnia and Herzegovina	4	2	2	323	320	+3	6	9th–16th place playoffs
4	North Macedonia	4	1	3	273	315	−42	5	9th–16th place playoffs
5	Sweden	4	0	4	249	307	−58	4	17th–22nd place classification

Source: FIBA

24 July 2026
18:00

Boxscore

Bosnia and Herzegovina	82–93	Hungary
Scoring by quarter: 18–28, 24–18, 20–22, 20–25

Dvorana Marino Cvetković, Opatija

24 July 2026
20:30

Boxscore

Georgia	83–66	North Macedonia
Scoring by quarter: 17–16, 19–20, 22–13, 25–17

Dvorana Marino Cvetković, Opatija

25 July 2026
13:00

Boxscore

Sweden	65–70	Georgia
Scoring by quarter: 21–21, 16–17, 19–17, 9–15

Centar Zamet, Rijeka

25 July 2026
18:00

Boxscore

North Macedonia	75–86	Bosnia and Herzegovina
Scoring by quarter: 28–23, 18–18, 15–18, 14–27

Centar Zamet, Rijeka

26 July 2026
10:30

Boxscore

Hungary	86–63	North Macedonia
Scoring by quarter: 21–6, 19–20, 20–16, 26–21

Dvorana Marino Cvetković, Opatija

26 July 2026
20:30

Boxscore

Bosnia and Herzegovina	89–69	Sweden
Scoring by quarter: 21–17, 20–13, 14–20, 34–19

Dvorana Marino Cvetković, Opatija

28 July 2026
10:30

Boxscore

Sweden	55–79	Hungary
Scoring by quarter: 18–18, 21–16, 13–18, 3–27

Dvorana Marino Cvetković, Opatija
Attendance: 100

28 July 2026
20:30

Boxscore

Georgia	83–66	Bosnia and Herzegovina
Scoring by quarter: 27–20, 23–16, 16–14, 17–16

Dvorana Marino Cvetković, Opatija
Attendance: 100

29 July 2026
10:30

Boxscore

North Macedonia	69–60	Sweden
Scoring by quarter: 18–21, 12–10, 20–12, 19–17

Centar Zamet, Rijeka
Attendance: 50

29 July 2026
18:00

Boxscore

Hungary	68–62	Georgia
Scoring by quarter: 24–15, 14–11, 9–19, 21–17

Centar Zamet, Rijeka
Attendance: 70

== 17th–22nd place classification ==
=== Group E ===
Pos	Team	Pld	W	L	PF	PA	PD	Pts	Qualification
1	Portugal	2	2	0	174	127	+47	4	17th place match
2	Norway	2	1	1	135	144	−9	3	19th place match
3	Ukraine	2	0	2	129	167	−38	2	21st place match

Updated to match(es) played on 31 July 2026. Source: FIBA

Note: The following match was carried over from the first round: UKR v. POR 68–91.

31 July 2026
10:30

Boxscore

Ukraine	61–76	Norway
Scoring by quarter: 9–15, 23–29, 19–19, 10–13

Centar Zamet, Rijeka
Attendance: 30

1 August 2026
10:30

Boxscore

Norway	59–83	Portugal
Scoring by quarter: 11–21, 17–23, 17–18, 14–21

Centar Zamet, Rijeka

=== Group F ===
Pos	Team	Pld	W	L	PF	PA	PD	Pts	Qualification
1	Ireland	2	1	1	185	166	+19	3	17th place match
2	Sweden	2	1	1	169	177	−8	3	19th place match
3	Cyprus	2	1	1	132	143	−11	3	21st place match

Updated to match(es) played on 31 July 2026. Source: FIBA

Note: The following match was carried over from the first round: IRL v. CYP 80–60.

31 July 2026
10:30

Boxscore

Cyprus	72–63	Sweden
Scoring by quarter: 21–14, 18–18, 22–15, 11–16

Dvorana Marino Cvetković, Opatija
Attendance: 50

1 August 2026
10:30

Boxscore

Sweden	106–105 (OT)	Ireland
Scoring by quarter: 24–16, 23–22, 17–26, 29–29, Overtime: 13–12

Dvorana Marino Cvetković, Opatija

=== 21st place match ===
2 August 2026
16:30

Boxscore

Ukraine	69–59	Cyprus
Scoring by quarter: 15–25, 15–13, 22–9, 17–12

Centar Zamet, Rijeka

=== 19th place match ===
2 August 2026
9:00

Boxscore

Norway	64–87	Sweden
Scoring by quarter: 17–23, 10–22, 22–25, 15–17

Dvorana Marino Cvetković, Opatija

=== 17th place match ===
2 August 2026
9:00

Boxscore

Portugal	60–82	Ireland
Scoring by quarter: 13–27, 19–20, 16–23, 12–12

Centar Zamet, Rijeka

== 9th–16th place playoffs ==
13th place match
Great Britain	83
North Macedonia	73
15th place match
Azerbaijan	73
Iceland	91

13th–16th place semifinals
Azerbaijan	55
Great Britain	67
Iceland	74
North Macedonia	86

9th–16th place quarterfinals
A3	Montenegro	77
B4	Azerbaijan	71
D3	Bosnia and Herzegovina	94
C4	Great Britain	64
B3	Iceland	75
A4	Switzerland	83
C3	Finland	98
D4	North Macedonia	77

9th–12th place semifinals
Montenegro	94
Bosnia and Herzegovina	71
Switzerland	84
Finland	66

9th place match
Montenegro	82
Switzerland	75
11th place match
Bosnia and Herzegovina	66
Finland	82

=== 9th–16th place quarterfinals ===
31 July 2026
13:00

Boxscore

Montenegro	77–71 (OT)	Azerbaijan
Scoring by quarter: 16–13, 15–15, 9–22, 21–11, Overtime: 16–10

Dvorana Marino Cvetković, Opatija
Attendance: 100

31 July 2026
15:30

Boxscore

Bosnia and Herzegovina	94–64	Great Britain
Scoring by quarter: 30–11, 12–13, 23–20, 29–20

Dvorana Marino Cvetković, Opatija
Attendance: 50

31 July 2026
18:00

Boxscore

Iceland	75–83	Switzerland
Scoring by quarter: 23–25, 16–15, 24–19, 12–24

Dvorana Marino Cvetković, Opatija
Attendance: 50

31 July 2026
20:30

Boxscore

Finland	98–77	North Macedonia
Scoring by quarter: 26–13, 29–14, 24–32, 19–18

Dvorana Marino Cvetković, Opatija
Attendance: 50

=== 13th–16th place semifinals ===
1 August 2026
13:00

Boxscore

Azerbaijan	55–67	Great Britain
Scoring by quarter: 13–9, 12–22, 15–15, 15–21

Dvorana Marino Cvetković, Opatija

1 August 2026
15:30

Boxscore

Iceland	74–86	North Macedonia
Scoring by quarter: 25–9, 12–35, 22–16, 15–26

Dvorana Marino Cvetković, Opatija

=== 15th place match ===
2 August 2026
11:30

Boxscore

Azerbaijan	73–91	Iceland
Scoring by quarter: 10–29, 24–16, 17–31, 22–15

Dvorana Marino Cvetković, Opatija

=== 13th place match ===
2 August 2026
11:30

Boxscore

Great Britain	83–73	North Macedonia
Scoring by quarter: 18–21, 25–18, 16–15, 24–19

Centar Zamet, Rijeka

=== 9th–12th place semifinals ===
1 August 2026
18:00

Boxscore

Montenegro	94–71	Bosnia and Herzegovina
Scoring by quarter: 23–14, 23–16, 27–20, 21–21

Dvorana Marino Cvetković, Opatija

1 August 2026
20:30

Boxscore

Switzerland	84–66	Finland
Scoring by quarter: 24–31, 27–6, 13–18, 20–11

Dvorana Marino Cvetković, Opatija

=== 11th place match ===
2 August 2026
16:30

Boxscore

Bosnia and Herzegovina	66–82	Finland
Scoring by quarter: 12–12, 21–25, 23–23, 10–22

Dvorana Marino Cvetković, Opatija

=== 9th place match ===
2 August 2026
19:00

Boxscore

Montenegro	82–75	Switzerland
Scoring by quarter: 23–18, 20–21, 13–19, 26–17

Dvorana Marino Cvetković, Opatija

== Championship playoffs ==
5th place match
Hungary	67
Romania	63
7th place match
Croatia	81
Georgia	83

5th–8th place semifinals
Croatia	73
Hungary	75
Romania	81
Georgia	74

Quarterfinals
A1	Croatia	66
B2	Poland	68
D1	Hungary	61
C2	Belgium	69
B1	Czech Republic	79
A2	Romania	65
C1	Netherlands	79
D2	Georgia	50

Semifinals
Poland	89
Belgium	81
Czech Republic	66
Netherlands	78

Final
Poland	57
Netherlands	71
3rd place match
Belgium	81
Czech Republic	64

=== Quarterfinals ===
31 July 2026
13:00

Boxscore

Czech Republic	79–65	Romania
Scoring by quarter: 25–17, 21–18, 14–21, 19–9

Centar Zamet, Rijeka
Attendance: 100

31 July 2026
15:30

Boxscore

Netherlands	79–50	Georgia
Scoring by quarter: 20–12, 19–25, 22–3, 18–10

Centar Zamet, Rijeka
Attendance: 100

31 July 2026
18:00

Boxscore

Croatia	66–68	Poland
Scoring by quarter: 19–18, 21–15, 16–21, 10–14

Centar Zamet, Rijeka
Attendance: 500

31 July 2026
20:30

Boxscore

Hungary	61–69	Belgium
Scoring by quarter: 13–29, 18–6, 11–21, 19–13

Centar Zamet, Rijeka
Attendance: 100

=== 5th–8th place semifinals ===
1 August 2026
13:00

Boxscore

Romania	81–74	Georgia
Scoring by quarter: 22–14, 16–18, 24–18, 19–24

Centar Zamet, Rijeka

1 August 2026
15:30

Boxscore

Croatia	73–75	Hungary
Scoring by quarter: 21–28, 15–12, 20–11, 17–24

Centar Zamet, Rijeka

=== 7th place match ===
2 August 2026
14:00

Boxscore

Georgia	83–81	Croatia
Scoring by quarter: 20–19, 12–26, 27–16, 24–20

Dvorana Marino Cvetković, Opatija

=== 5th place match ===
2 August 2026
14:00

Boxscore

Romania	63–67	Hungary
Scoring by quarter: 14–14, 16–14, 19–24, 14–15

Centar Zamet, Rijeka

=== Semifinals ===
1 August 2026
18:00

Boxscore

Czech Republic	66–78	Netherlands
Scoring by quarter: 16–15, 23–19, 12–21, 15–23

Centar Zamet, Rijeka

1 August 2026
20:30

Boxscore

Poland	89–81	Belgium
Scoring by quarter: 20–25, 20–15, 28–21, 21–20

Centar Zamet, Rijeka

=== 3rd place match ===
2 August 2026
19:00

Boxscore

Czech Republic	64–81	Belgium
Scoring by quarter: 18–28, 17–17, 17–23, 12–13

Centar Zamet, Rijeka

=== Final ===
2 August 2026
21:30

Boxscore

Netherlands	71–57	Poland
Scoring by quarter: 12–17, 17–13, 18–15, 24–12

Centar Zamet, Rijeka

== Final standings ==
Rank	Team	Record
1st place, gold medalist(s)	Netherlands	8–0
2nd place, silver medalist(s)	Poland	6–2
3rd place, bronze medalist(s)	Belgium	6–2
4th	Czech Republic	6–2
5th	Hungary	6–1
6th	Romania	4–3
7th	Georgia	4–3
8th	Croatia	4–3
9th	Montenegro	5–2
10th	Switzerland	3–4
11th	Finland	4–4
12th	Bosnia and Herzegovina	3–4
13th	Great Britain	4–4
14th	North Macedonia	2–5
15th	Iceland	4–4
16th	Azerbaijan	2–6
17th	Ireland	3–4
18th	Portugal	2–5
19th	Sweden	2–5
20th	Norway	1–6
21st	Ukraine	1–6
22nd	Cyprus	1–6

Promoted to the 2027 FIBA U18 EuroBasket Division A
Relegated to the 2027 FIBA U18 EuroBasket Division C

== Statistics and awards ==
=== Statistical leaders ===
==== Players ====
Points

Name	PPG
(Belgium) Aaron Ona Embo	25.3
(Finland) Reino Saivosalmi	17.3
(North Macedonia) Gjorgji Cvetkovski	17.3
(Switzerland) Elyjah Rebetez	17.0
(Azerbaijan) Emmanuel Agbason	16.4

Blocks

Name	BPG
(Azerbaijan) Emmanuel Agbason	5.0
(Norway) Mathias Flesche	3.6
(Romania) Alexandru-Stefan Serban	2.4
(Ukraine) Yehor Koshelev	2.0
(Cyprus) Artem Mikheev	1.9
(Switzerland) Petar Filipović	1.9

Rebounds

Name	RPG
(Azerbaijan) Emmanuel Agbason	16.6
(Norway) Mathias Flesche	12.4
(Switzerland) Ibrahim Diallo	10.0
(Portugal) Miguel Sousa	10.0
(Bosnia and Herzegovina) Edin Preldžić	10.0

Steals

Name	SPG
(Cyprus) Kyriacos Constantinou	3.1
(Switzerland) Dario Cokara	3.1
(Republic of Ireland) Mark Burns	2.6
(Portugal) David Giesta	2.6
(North Macedonia) Grigorij Gjorgjevikj	2.6

Assists

Name	APG
(Georgia (country)) Mate Khatiashvili	8.1
(Czech Republic) Marek Houska	7.5
(Romania) David-Ioan Rașoga	6.4
(North Macedonia) Grigorij Gjorgjevikj	6.4
(Switzerland) Dario Cokara	5.9

Efficiency

Name	EFFPG
(Azerbaijan) Emmanuel Agbason	30.9
(Czech Republic) Marek Houska	19.6
(Romania) David-Ioan Rașoga	18.7
(Belgium) Aaron Ona Embo	18.3
(Norway) Mathias Flesche	18.1

==== Teams ====
Points

Name	PPG
Belgium	83.4
Croatia	81.4
Netherlands	80.3
Bosnia and Herzegovina	79.1
Iceland	78.8

Blocks

Name	BPG
Great Britain	6.9
Azerbaijan	5.6
Norway	4.9
Georgia	4.7
Romania	4.7

Rebounds

Name	RPG
Great Britain	49.0
Czech Republic	48.8
Netherlands	48.5
Ireland	48.4
Azerbaijan	47.1

Steals

Name	SPG
Ireland	12.9
Iceland	12.4
Netherlands	12.0
Switzerland	12.0
Portugal	11.4

Assists

Name	APG
Croatia	20.9
Iceland	20.5
Ireland	19.4
Bosnia and Herzegovina	19.3
Montenegro	18.9

Efficiency

Name	EFFPG
Croatia	95.7
Belgium	90.0
Netherlands	89.0
Bosnia and Herzegovina	88.7
Montenegro	84.7

=== Awards ===
The awards were announced on 2 August 2026.

Award	Player
All-Tournament Team	(Netherlands) Tayshawn Gipson
All-Tournament Team	(Poland) Hubert Swirydowicz
All-Tournament Team	(Belgium) Aaron Ona Embo
All-Tournament Team	(Czech Republic) Marek Houska
All-Tournament Team	(Netherlands) Jayden Anike
Most Valuable Player	(Netherlands) Tayshawn Gipson
