= 2023 FIBA U18 European Championship Division B =

Basketball championship

Tournament details
- Host country: Portugal
- City: Matosinhos
- Dates: 21–30 July 2023
- Teams: 22 (from 1 confederation)
- Venues: 3 (in 1 host city)

Final positions
- Champions: Latvia (1st title)
- Runners-up: Belgium
- Third place: Montenegro
- Fourth place: Austria

Official website
- www.fiba.basketball

The 2023 FIBA U18 European Championship Division B was the 17th edition of the Division B of the European basketball championship for men's national under-18 teams. The tournament was played in Matosinhos, Portugal, from 21 to 30 July 2023.

== Participating teams ==
- Albania
- Austria
- Belgium
- Bosnia and Herzegovina
- Bulgaria
- Estonia
- Georgia
- Great Britain ▼ (15th place, 2022 FIBA U18 European Championship Division A)
- Hungary
- Iceland
- Ireland
- Kosovo
- Latvia
- Montenegro ▼ (16th place, 2022 FIBA U18 European Championship Division A)
- Netherlands
- North Macedonia ▼ (14th place, 2022 FIBA U18 European Championship Division A)
- Norway
- Portugal
- Romania
- Slovakia
- Switzerland
- Ukraine

== First round ==
The draw of the first round was held on 14 February 2023 in Freising, Germany.

In the first round, the teams were drawn into four groups. The first two teams from each group advance to the quarterfinals; the third and fourth teams advance to the 9th–16th place playoffs; the other teams will play in the 17th–22nd place classification groups.

All times are local (Western European Summer Time – UTC+1).

=== Group A ===
Pos	Team	Pld	W	L	PF	PA	PD	Pts	Qualification
1	Great Britain	4	4	0	324	273	+51	8	Quarterfinals
2	Austria	4	3	1	320	289	+31	7	Quarterfinals
3	Iceland	4	2	2	311	292	+19	6	9th–16th place playoffs
4	North Macedonia	4	1	3	301	333	−32	5	9th–16th place playoffs
5	Norway	4	0	4	291	360	−69	4	17th–22nd place classification

Source: FIBA

21 July 2023
18:00

Boxscore

Austria	97–64	Norway

Pavilhão Municipal de Custóias, Matosinhos

21 July 2023
20:30

Boxscore

Great Britain	77–68	Iceland

Pavilhão Municipal de Custóias, Matosinhos

22 July 2023
18:00

Boxscore

North Macedonia	68–84	Great Britain

Pavilhão Municipal de Guifões, Matosinhos

22 July 2023
18:00

Boxscore

Iceland	72–82	Austria

Centro de Desportos e Congressos de Matosinhos

23 July 2023
13:00

Boxscore

Norway	74–79	Iceland

Pavilhão Municipal de Guifões, Matosinhos

23 July 2023
15:30

Boxscore

Austria	77–74	North Macedonia

Pavilhão Municipal de Guifões, Matosinhos

25 July 2023
15:30

Boxscore

Great Britain	79–64	Austria

Centro de Desportos e Congressos de Matosinhos

25 July 2023
18:00

Boxscore

North Macedonia	100–80	Norway

Centro de Desportos e Congressos de Matosinhos

26 July 2023
13:00

Boxscore

Norway	73–84	Great Britain

Pavilhão Municipal de Guifões, Matosinhos

26 July 2023
15:30

Boxscore

Iceland	92–59	North Macedonia

Pavilhão Municipal de Custóias, Matosinhos

=== Group B ===
Pos	Team	Pld	W	L	PF	PA	PD	Pts	Qualification
1	Slovakia	5	4	1	362	310	+52	9	Quarterfinals
2	Montenegro	5	4	1	413	365	+48	9	Quarterfinals
3	Hungary	5	3	2	264	263	+1	8	9th–16th place playoffs
4	Bosnia and Herzegovina	5	3	2	406	360	+46	8	9th–16th place playoffs
5	Georgia	5	1	4	394	393	+1	6	17th–22nd place classification
6	Albania	5	0	5	257	436	−179	5	17th–22nd place classification

Source: FIBA

21 July 2023
13:00

Boxscore

Slovakia	77–55	Georgia

Pavilhão Municipal de Guifões, Matosinhos

21 July 2023
15:30

Boxscore

Hungary	57–71	Montenegro

Pavilhão Municipal de Guifões, Matosinhos

22 July 2023
13:00

Boxscore

Montenegro	99–68	Albania

Pavilhão Municipal de Guifões, Matosinhos

22 July 2023
15:30

Boxscore

Bosnia and Herzegovina	77–57	Slovakia

Pavilhão Municipal de Custóias, Matosinhos

22 July 2023
15:30

Boxscore

Georgia	80–91	Hungary

Centro de Desportos e Congressos de Matosinhos

23 July 2023
15:30

Boxscore

Montenegro	83–80	Bosnia and Herzegovina

Centro de Desportos e Congressos de Matosinhos

23 July 2023
18:00

Boxscore

Hungary	60–64	Slovakia

Pavilhão Municipal de Guifões, Matosinhos

23 July 2023
20:30

Boxscore

Albania	50–107	Georgia

Pavilhão Municipal de Custóias, Matosinhos

24 July 2023
15:30

Boxscore

Albania	51–92	Bosnia and Herzegovina

Centro de Desportos e Congressos de Matosinhos

25 July 2023
13:00

Boxscore

Bosnia and Herzegovina	64–95	Hungary

Pavilhão Municipal de Guifões, Matosinhos

25 July 2023
18:00

Boxscore

Georgia	78–82	Montenegro

Pavilhão Municipal de Custóias, Matosinhos

25 July 2023
20:30

Boxscore

Slovakia	82–40	Albania

Pavilhão Municipal de Guifões, Matosinhos

26 July 2023
15:30

Boxscore

Georgia	74–93	Bosnia and Herzegovina

Pavilhão Municipal de Guifões, Matosinhos

26 July 2023
18:00

Boxscore

Montenegro	78–82	Slovakia

Centro de Desportos e Congressos de Matosinhos

26 July 2023
20:30

Boxscore

Albania	48–56	Hungary

Pavilhão Municipal de Custóias, Matosinhos

=== Group C ===
Pos	Team	Pld	W	L	PF	PA	PD	Pts	Qualification
1	Netherlands	5	5	0	449	341	+108	10	Quarterfinals
2	Romania	5	4	1	397	366	+31	9	Quarterfinals
3	Estonia	5	3	2	380	348	+32	8	9th–16th place playoffs
4	Ukraine	5	2	3	375	392	−17	7	9th–16th place playoffs
5	Ireland	5	1	4	375	455	−80	6	17th–22nd place classification
6	Kosovo	5	0	5	329	403	−74	5	17th–22nd place classification

Source: FIBA

21 July 2023
15:30

Boxscore

Ukraine	67–85	Netherlands

Pavilhão Municipal de Custóias, Matosinhos

21 July 2023
18:00

Boxscore

Kosovo	60–68	Estonia

Centro de Desportos e Congressos de Matosinhos

21 July 2023
20:30

Boxscore

Ireland	88–94	Romania

Centro de Desportos e Congressos de Matosinhos

22 July 2023
15:30

Boxscore

Estonia	82–58	Ireland

Pavilhão Municipal de Guifões, Matosinhos

22 July 2023
18:00

Boxscore

Romania	72–66	Ukraine

Pavilhão Municipal de Custóias, Matosinhos

22 July 2023
20:30

Boxscore

Netherlands	82–67	Kosovo

Pavilhão Municipal de Guifões, Matosinhos

23 July 2023
18:00

Boxscore

Netherlands	82–71	Estonia

Pavilhão Municipal de Custóias, Matosinhos

23 July 2023
18:00

Boxscore

Ukraine	87–78	Ireland

Centro de Desportos e Congressos de Matosinhos

23 July 2023
20:30

Boxscore

Kosovo	64–98	Romania

Pavilhão Municipal de Guifões, Matosinhos

25 July 2023
15:30

Boxscore

Romania	62–78	Netherlands

Pavilhão Municipal de Guifões, Matosinhos

25 July 2023
18:00

Boxscore

Estonia	89–77	Ukraine

Pavilhão Municipal de Guifões, Matosinhos

25 July 2023
20:30

Boxscore

Ireland	77–70	Kosovo

Pavilhão Municipal de Custóias, Matosinhos

26 July 2023
15:30

Boxscore

Netherlands	122–74	Ireland

Centro de Desportos e Congressos de Matosinhos

26 July 2023
18:00

Boxscore

Romania	71–70	Estonia

Pavilhão Municipal de Guifões, Matosinhos

26 July 2023
20:30

Boxscore

Kosovo	68–78	Ukraine

Pavilhão Municipal de Guifões, Matosinhos

=== Group D ===
Pos	Team	Pld	W	L	PF	PA	PD	Pts	Qualification
1	Latvia	4	4	0	311	278	+33	8	Quarterfinals
2	Belgium	4	2	2	287	299	−12	6	Quarterfinals
3	Bulgaria	4	2	2	309	286	+23	6	9th–16th place playoffs
4	Portugal	4	1	3	300	313	−13	5	9th–16th place playoffs
5	Switzerland	4	1	3	289	320	−31	5	17th–22nd place classification

Source: FIBA

21 July 2023
18:00

Boxscore

Bulgaria	85–77	Switzerland

Pavilhão Municipal de Guifões, Matosinhos

21 July 2023
20:30

Boxscore

Latvia	85–71	Belgium

Pavilhão Municipal de Guifões, Matosinhos

22 July 2023
20:30

Boxscore

Portugal	73–75	Latvia

Centro de Desportos e Congressos de Matosinhos

22 July 2023
20:30

Boxscore

Belgium	76–75 (OT)	Bulgaria

Pavilhão Municipal de Custóias, Matosinhos

23 July 2023
15:30

Boxscore

Switzerland	68–61	Belgium

Pavilhão Municipal de Custóias, Matosinhos

23 July 2023
20:30

Boxscore

Bulgaria	85–59	Portugal

Centro de Desportos e Congressos de Matosinhos

25 July 2023
15:30

Boxscore

Latvia	74–64	Bulgaria

Pavilhão Municipal de Custóias, Matosinhos

25 July 2023
20:30

Boxscore

Portugal	97–74	Switzerland

Centro de Desportos e Congressos de Matosinhos

26 July 2023
18:00

Boxscore

Switzerland	70–77	Latvia

Pavilhão Municipal de Custóias, Matosinhos

26 July 2023
20:30

Boxscore

Belgium	79–71 (OT)	Portugal

Centro de Desportos e Congressos de Matosinhos

== 17th–22nd place classification ==
=== Group E ===
Pos	Team	Pld	W	L	PF	PA	PD	Pts	Qualification
1	Norway	2	2	0	183	104	+79	4	17th place match
2	Georgia	2	1	1	180	140	+40	3	19th place match
3	Albania	2	0	2	81	200	−119	2	21st place match

Source: FIBA

28 July 2023
15:30

Boxscore

Albania	31–93	Norway

Pavilhão Municipal de Guifões, Matosinhos

29 July 2023
15:30

Boxscore

Norway	90–73	Georgia

Pavilhão Municipal de Guifões, Matosinhos

=== Group F ===
Pos	Team	Pld	W	L	PF	PA	PD	Pts	Qualification
1	Switzerland	2	2	0	163	157	+6	4	17th place match
2	Ireland	2	1	1	150	148	+2	3	19th place match
3	Kosovo	2	0	2	154	162	−8	2	21st place match

Source: FIBA

28 July 2023
15:30

Boxscore

Kosovo	84–85 (OT)	Switzerland

Pavilhão Municipal de Custóias, Matosinhos

29 July 2023
15:30

Boxscore

Switzerland	78–73	Ireland

Pavilhão Municipal de Custóias, Matosinhos

=== 21st place match ===
30 July 2023
15:00

Boxscore

Albania	64–85	Kosovo

Centro de Desportos e Congressos de Matosinhos

=== 19th place match ===
30 July 2023
10:30

Boxscore

Georgia	93–81	Ireland

Pavilhão Municipal de Custóias, Matosinhos

=== 17th place match ===
30 July 2023
13:00

Boxscore

Norway	72–69	Switzerland

Pavilhão Municipal de Custóias, Matosinhos

== 9th–16th place playoffs ==
13th place match
Bosnia and Herzegovina	82
Estonia (OT)	88
15th place match
Ukraine	90
North Macedonia	74

13th–16th place semifinals
Bosnia and Herzegovina	83
Ukraine	72
North Macedonia	90
Estonia	99

9th–16th place quarterfinals
A3	Iceland	86
B4	Bosnia and Herzegovina	83
D3	Bulgaria	87
C4	Ukraine	62
B3	Hungary	86
A4	North Macedonia	70
C3	Estonia	57
D4	Portugal	80

9th–12th place semifinals
Iceland	90
Bulgaria	96
Hungary	69
Portugal	74

9th place match
Bulgaria	61
Portugal	85
11th place match
Iceland	81
Hungary	84

=== 9th–16th place quarterfinals ===
28 July 2023
18:00

Boxscore

Bulgaria	87–62	Ukraine

Pavilhão Municipal de Guifões, Matosinhos

28 July 2023
18:00

Boxscore

Hungary	86–70	North Macedonia

Pavilhão Municipal de Custóias, Matosinhos

28 July 2023
20:30

Boxscore

Iceland	86–83	Bosnia and Herzegovina

Pavilhão Municipal de Guifões, Matosinhos

28 July 2023
20:30

Boxscore

Estonia	57–80	Portugal

Pavilhão Municipal de Custóias, Matosinhos

=== 13th–16th place semifinals ===
29 July 2023
18:00

Boxscore

Bosnia and Herzegovina	83–72	Ukraine

Pavilhão Municipal de Custóias, Matosinhos

29 July 2023
20:30

Boxscore

North Macedonia	90–99	Estonia

Pavilhão Municipal de Custóias, Matosinhos

=== 9th–12th place semifinals ===
29 July 2023
15:30

Boxscore

Hungary	69–74	Portugal

Centro de Desportos e Congressos de Matosinhos

29 July 2023
18:00

Boxscore

Iceland	90–96	Bulgaria

Pavilhão Municipal de Guifões, Matosinhos

=== 15th place match ===
30 July 2023
15:30

Boxscore

Ukraine	90–74	North Macedonia

Pavilhão Municipal de Guifões, Matosinhos

=== 13th place match ===
30 July 2023
18:00

Boxscore

Bosnia and Herzegovina	82–88 (OT)	Estonia

Pavilhão Municipal de Guifões, Matosinhos

=== 11th place match ===
30 July 2023
13:00

Boxscore

Iceland	81–84	Hungary

Pavilhão Municipal de Guifões, Matosinhos

=== 9th place match ===
30 July 2023
12:30

Boxscore

Bulgaria	61–85	Portugal

Centro de Desportos e Congressos de Matosinhos

== Championship playoffs ==
5th place match
Great Britain (OT)	95
Netherlands	94
7th place match
Romania	84
Slovakia	55

5th–8th place semifinals
Great Britain	79
Romania	67
Slovakia	65
Netherlands	74

Quarterfinals
A1	Great Britain	62
B2	Montenegro	65
D1	Latvia	90
C2	Romania	69
B1	Slovakia	78
A2	Austria	91
C1	Netherlands	46
D2	Belgium	56

Semifinals
Montenegro	83
Latvia	96
Austria	62
Belgium	85

Final
Latvia	75
Belgium	69
3rd place match
Montenegro	85
Austria	80

=== Quarterfinals ===
28 July 2023
13:00

Boxscore

Great Britain	62–65	Montenegro

Centro de Desportos e Congressos de Matosinhos

28 July 2023
15:30

Boxscore

Latvia	90–69	Romania

Centro de Desportos e Congressos de Matosinhos

28 July 2023
18:00

Boxscore

Netherlands	46–56	Belgium

Centro de Desportos e Congressos de Matosinhos

28 July 2023
20:30

Boxscore

Slovakia	78–91	Austria

Centro de Desportos e Congressos de Matosinhos

=== 5th–8th place semifinals ===
29 July 2023
13:00

Boxscore

Great Britain	79–67	Romania

Centro de Desportos e Congressos de Matosinhos

29 July 2023
20:30

Boxscore

Slovakia	65–74	Netherlands

Pavilhão Municipal de Guifões, Matosinhos

=== Semifinals ===
29 July 2023
18:00

Boxscore

Montenegro	83–96	Latvia

Centro de Desportos e Congressos de Matosinhos

29 July 2023
20:30

Boxscore

Austria	62–85	Belgium

Centro de Desportos e Congressos de Matosinhos

=== 7th place match ===
30 July 2023
15:30

Boxscore

Romania	84–55	Slovakia

Pavilhão Municipal de Custóias, Matosinhos

=== 5th place match ===
30 July 2023
18:00

Boxscore

Great Britain	95–94 (OT)	Netherlands

Pavilhão Municipal de Custóias, Matosinhos

=== 3rd place match ===
30 July 2023
17:30

Boxscore

Montenegro	85–80	Austria
Scoring by quarter: 19–28, 28–18, 17–17, 21–17

Centro de Desportos e Congressos de Matosinhos

=== Final ===
30 July 2023
20:00

Boxscore

Latvia	75–69	Belgium
Scoring by quarter: 16–13, 19–18, 21–25, 19–13

Centro de Desportos e Congressos de Matosinhos

== Final standings ==
Rank	Team	Record
1st place, gold medalist(s)	Latvia	7–0
2nd place, silver medalist(s)	Belgium	4–3
3rd place, bronze medalist(s)	Montenegro	6–2
4	Austria	4–3
5	Great Britain	6–1
6	Netherlands	6–2
7	Romania	5–3
8	Slovakia	4–4
9	Portugal	4–3
10	Bulgaria	4–3
11	Hungary	5–3
12	Iceland	3–4
13	Estonia	5–3
14	Bosnia and Herzegovina	4–4
15	Ukraine	3–5
16	North Macedonia	1–6
17	Norway	3–4
18	Switzerland	3–4
19	Georgia	2–5
20	Ireland	1–6
21	Kosovo	1–6
22	Albania	0–7

Promoted to the 2024 FIBA U18 EuroBasket Division A
Relegated to the 2024 FIBA U18 EuroBasket Division C
