= Montenegro men's national under-18 basketball team =

Montenegro
- FIBA zone: FIBA Europe
- National federation: Košarkaški Savez Crne Gore

U19 World Cup
- Appearances: None

U18 EuroBasket
- Appearances: 6
- Medals: None

U18 EuroBasket Division B
- Appearances: 12
- Medals: Gold: 2 (2013, 2016); Bronze: 3 (2009, 2010, 2023)
Light	Dark

The Montenegro men's national under-18 basketball team is a national basketball team of Montenegro, administered by the Basketball Federation of Montenegro. It represents the country in international under-18 men's basketball competitions.

== FIBA U18 EuroBasket participations ==
Year	Division A	Division B
2007		4th
2008		10th
2009		3rd place, bronze medalist(s)
2010		3rd place, bronze medalist(s)
2011		4th
2012		5th
2013		1st place, gold medalist(s)
2014	11th	
2015	14th	

Year	Division A	Division B
2016		1st place, gold medalist(s)
2017	13th	
2018	8th	
2019	12th	
2022	16th	
2023		3rd place, bronze medalist(s)
2024		5th
2025		5th
2026		9th

== See also ==
- Montenegro men's national basketball team
- Montenegro men's national under-17 basketball team
- Montenegro women's national under-18 basketball team
