= Czechoslovakia men's national under-18 basketball team =

Basketball youth national team

Czechoslovakia
- FIBA zone: FIBA Europe
- National federation: Basketball Federation of Czechoslovakia

U19 World Cup
- Appearances: None

U18 EuroBasket
- Appearances: 13
- Medals: Bronze: 1 (1988)

The Czechoslovakia men's national under-18 basketball team was a national basketball team of Czechoslovakia. It represented the country in men's international under-18 basketball competitions.

== FIBA U18 EuroBasket participations ==
Year	Result in Division A
1964	5th
1966	4th
1968	10th
1970	8th
1972	5th
1974	9th
1978	7th

Year	Result in Division A
1980	8th
1982	7th
1984	6th
1986	8th
1988	3rd place, bronze medalist(s)
1990	11th

== See also ==
- Czechoslovakia men's national basketball team
- Czechoslovakia men's national under-16 basketball team
