= Ireland men's national under-18 basketball team =

National basketball team of the Island of Ireland

Ireland
- FIBA zone: FIBA Europe
- National federation: Basketball Ireland

U19 World Cup
- Appearances: None

U18 EuroBasket
- Appearances: None

U18 EuroBasket Division B
- Appearances: 14
- Medals: None

U18 EuroBasket Division C
- Appearances: 3
- Medals: Silver: 1 (1999); Bronze: 1 (2018)

The Ireland men's national under-18 basketball team is a national basketball team of the Island of Ireland, administered by the Basketball Ireland. It represents the country in international under-18 men's basketball competitions.

== FIBA U18 EuroBasket participations ==
Year	Division B	Division C
1997		5th
1999		2nd place, silver medalist(s)
2005	16th	
2006	19th	
2007	16th	
2008	20th	
2014	22nd	
2015	22nd	
2016	23rd	

Year	Division B	Division C
2017	24th	
2018		3rd place, bronze medalist(s)
2019	16th	
2022	20th	
2023	20th	
2024	11th	
2025	20th	
2026	17th	

== See also ==
- Ireland men's national basketball team
- Ireland men's national under-16 basketball team
- Ireland women's national under-18 basketball team
