= Switzerland men's national under-18 basketball team =

Switzerland
- FIBA zone: FIBA Europe
- National federation: Swiss Basketball

U19 World Cup
- Appearances: 1 (2025)
- Medals: None

U18 EuroBasket
- Appearances: None

U18 EuroBasket Division B
- Appearances: 17
- Medals: None
Home	Away

The Switzerland men's national under-18 and under-19 basketball team is a national basketball team of Switzerland, administered by the Swiss Basketball. It represents the country in international under-18 and under-19 men's basketball competitions.

The team competes in the Division B of the FIBA U18 EuroBasket. Switzerland also hosted the 2025 FIBA Under-19 Basketball World Cup where they finished in 8th place.

Toni Rocak who later played in the US-based NCAA and also became a member of Switzerland's senior team is a notable former member.

== Tournament record ==
=== FIBA U19 Basketball World Cup ===
Year	Position
(Greece) 1995	DNQ
(Portugal) 1999	DNQ
(Greece) 2003	DNQ
(Serbia) 2007	DNQ
(New Zealand) 2009	DNQ
(Latvia) 2011	DNQ
(Czech Republic) 2013	DNQ
(Greece) 2015	DNQ
(Egypt) 2017	DNQ
(Greece) 2019	DNQ
(Latvia) 2021	DNQ
(Hungary) 2023	DNQ
(Switzerland) 2025	8th
(Czech Republic) 2027	TBD
(Indonesia) 2029	TBD

=== FIBA U18 EuroBasket ===
Year	Result in Division B
2007	19th
2008	16th
2009	12th
2010	11th
2011	13th
2012	21st
2013	15th
2014	21st
2015	14th

Year	Result in Division B
2017	19th
2018	17th
2019	19th
2022	19th
2023	18th
2024	6th
2025	14th
2026	10th

== See also ==
- Switzerland men's national basketball team
- Switzerland men's national under-16 basketball team
- Switzerland women's national under-18 basketball team
