= Portugal men's national under-18 and under-19 basketball team =

Portugal
- FIBA zone: FIBA Europe
- National federation: Portuguese Basketball Federation

U19 World Cup
- Appearances: 1 (1999)
- Medals: None

U18 EuroBasket
- Appearances: None

U18 EuroBasket Division B
- Appearances: 20
- Medals: Bronze: 1 (2006)
Home	Away

The Portugal men's national under-18 and under-19 basketball team is a national basketball team of Portugal, administered by the Federação Portuguesa de Basquetebol. It represents the country in international under-18 and under-19 men's basketball competitions.

Portugal hosted the 1999 FIBA Under-19 World Championship, where they finished in 16th place.

== FIBA U18 EuroBasket participations ==
Year	Result in Division B
2005	5th
2006	3rd place, bronze medalist(s)
2007	12th
2008	7th
2009	18th
2010	18th
2011	12th
2012	10th
2013	10th
2014	7th

Year	Result in Division B
2015	12th
2016	14th
2017	11th
2018	8th
2019	6th
2022	5th
2023	9th
2024	7th
2025	11th
2026	18th

== FIBA Under-19 Basketball World Cup participations ==
Year	Result
1999	16th

== See also ==
- Portugal men's national basketball team
- Portugal men's national under-16 basketball team
- Portugal women's national under-18 basketball team
