= Bosnia and Herzegovina men's national under-18 basketball team =

Bosnia and Herzegovina
- FIBA zone: FIBA Europe
- National federation: Košarkaški savez Bosne i Hercegovine
- Coach: (Bosnia and Herzegovina) Irhad Tinjak
- Nickname(s): Zlatni ljiljani (The Golden Lilies); Zmajevi (The Dragons)

U19 World Cup
- Appearances: None

U18 EuroBasket
- Appearances: 6
- Medals: None

U18 EuroBasket Division B
- Appearances: 13
- Medals: Gold: 1 (2012)
Home	Away

The Bosnia and Herzegovina men's national under-18 basketball team is a national basketball team of Bosnia and Herzegovina, administered by the Basketball Federation of Bosnia and Herzegovina. It represents the country in international under-18 men's basketball competitions.

== FIBA U18 EuroBasket participations ==
Year	Division A	Division B	Head coach
2005		8th	
2006		9th	
2007		7th	
2008		14th	
2009		8th	
2010		8th	
2012		1st place, gold medalist(s)	
2013	13th		Nenad Marković
2014	12th		Dragan Bajić
2015	4th		Marko Trbić
2016	6th		Josip Pandža
2017	8th		Boris Džidić
2018	16th		Boris Džidić
2019		12th	
2022		6th	
2023		14th	
2024		18th	
2025		7th	Marin Bubalo
2026		12th	Irhad Tinjak

== See also ==
- Bosnia and Herzegovina men's national basketball team
- Bosnia and Herzegovina men's national under-20 basketball team
- Bosnia and Herzegovina men's national under-16 and under-17 basketball team
- Bosnia and Herzegovina women's national under-18 basketball team
