= 1970 FIBA Europe Under-18 Championship =

International basketball competition

1970 EuroBasket Under-18
4th FIBA Europe Under-18 Championship

Tournament details
- Host country: Greece
- Teams: 12

Final positions
- Champions: Soviet Union (4th title)

The 1970 FIBA Europe Under-18 Championship was an international basketball competition held in Greece in 1970.

== Final ranking ==
1. Soviet Union

2. Greece

3. Italy

4. Yugoslavia

5. Spain

6. Poland

7. Bulgaria

8. Czechoslovakia

9. Romania

10. West Germany

11. Turkey

12. Belgium

== Awards ==
Winners
Soviet Union
