= Bulgaria men's national under-18 basketball team =

Bulgaria
- FIBA zone: FIBA Europe
- National federation: Bulgarian Basketball Federation
- Nickname: Лъвовете (The Lions)

U19 World Cup
- Appearances: None

U18 EuroBasket
- Appearances: 22
- Medals: Bronze: 2 (1980, 1982)

U18 EuroBasket Division B
- Appearances: 10
- Medals: Gold: 1 (2011); Bronze: 1 (2024)
| Home | Away |

The Bulgaria men's national under-18 basketball team is a national basketball team of Bulgaria, administered by the Bulgarian Basketball Federation. It represents the country in international under-18 men's basketball competitions.

== FIBA U18 EuroBasket participations ==
| Year | Division A | Division B |
|---|---|---|
| 1964 | 4th | |
| 1966 | 5th | |
| 1970 | 7th | |
| 1972 | 12th | |
| 1976 | 4th | |
| 1978 | 4th | |
| 1980 | 3rd place, bronze medalist(s) | |
| 1982 | 3rd place, bronze medalist(s) | |
| 1984 | 10th | |
| 1998 | 8th | |
| 2000 | 12th | |
| 2004 | 10th | |
| 2005 | 12th | |
| 2006 | 8th | |
| 2007 | 14th | |
| 2008 | 13th | |

| Year | Division A | Division B |
|---|---|---|
| 2009 | 10th | |
| 2010 | 16th | |
| 2011 | | 1st place, gold medalist(s) |
| 2012 | 8th | |
| 2013 | 15th | |
| 2014 | | 14th |
| 2015 | | 19th |
| 2016 | | 12th |
| 2017 | | 7th |
| 2018 | | 11th |
| 2019 | | 14th |
| 2022 | | 16th |
| 2023 | | 10th |
| 2024 | | 3rd place, bronze medalist(s) |
| 2025 | 13th | |
| 2026 | 16th | |

== See also ==
- Bulgaria men's national basketball team
- Bulgaria men's national under-16 basketball team
- Bulgaria women's national under-18 basketball team
