= England men's national under-18 basketball team =

Youth basketball team representing England

England
- FIBA zone: FIBA Europe
- National federation: Basketball England

U19 World Cup
- Appearances: None

U18 EuroBasket
- Appearances: 2
- Medals: None

U18 EuroBasket Division B
- Appearances: 10
- Medals: Bronze: 1 (2012)
Home	Away

The England men's national under-18 basketball team is a national basketball team of England, administered by Basketball England. It represents the country in international under-18 men's basketball competitions.

== FIBA U18 EuroBasket participations ==
Year	Division A	Division B
2005		14th
2006		4th
2007		18th
2008		18th
2009		4th
2010		6th
2011		14th
2012		3rd place, bronze medalist(s)
2013	9th	
2014	14th	
2015		7th
2016		9th

== Former players ==
- Dan Akin

== See also ==
- England men's national basketball team
- England men's national under-16 basketball team
- England women's national under-18 basketball team
- Great Britain men's national under-18 basketball team
