= Hungary men's national under-18 basketball team =

Youth basketball team representing Hungary

Hungary
- FIBA zone: FIBA Europe
- National federation: Hungarian Basketball Federation

U19 World Cup
- Appearances: 1
- Medals: None

U18 EuroBasket
- Appearances: 4
- Medals: None

U18 EuroBasket Division B
- Appearances: 20
- Medals: Bronze: 1 (2005)

The Hungary men's national under-18 and under-19 basketball team is a national basketball team of Hungary, administered by the Hungarian Basketball Federation. It represents the country in international under-18 and under-19 men's basketball competitions.

== FIBA U18 EuroBasket participations ==
Year	Division A	Division B
1972	8th	
1982	11th	
1986	9th	
1992	11th	
2005		3rd place, bronze medalist(s)
2006		11th
2007		8th
2008		17th
2009		9th
2010		13th
2011		8th
2012		11th

Year	Division A	Division B
2013		13th
2014		8th
2015		5th
2016		4th
2017		12th
2018		10th
2019		15th
2022		14th
2023		11th
2024		9th
2025		6th
2026		5th

== FIBA Under-19 Basketball World Cup participations ==
Year	Result
2023	16th

== See also ==
- Hungary men's national basketball team
- Hungary men's national under-16 basketball team
- Hungary women's national under-19 basketball team
