= 2012 FIBA Europe Under-18 Championship Division B =

- 2012 FIBA Europe Under-18 Championship Division B

Tournament details
- Host country: Bosnia and Herzegovina
- Teams: 22

Final positions
- Champions: Bosnia and Herzegovina (1st title)

Official website
- www.fibaeurope.com

The 2012 FIBA Europe Under-18 Championship Division B was an international basketball competition held in Bosnia and Herzegovina in 2012.

== Final ranking ==
1. Bosnia and Herzegovina

2. Czech Republic

3. England

4. Finland

5. Montenegro

6. Estonia

7. Israel

8. Belgium

9. Netherlands

10. Portugal

11. Hungary

12. Austria

13. Iceland

14. Sweden

15. Romania

16. Slovakia

17. (Georgia (country)) Georgia

18. Belarus

19. Luxembourg

20. Norway

21. Switzerland

22. Scotland

== Awards ==
Winners
Bosnia and Herzegovina
