= 1978 FIBA Europe Under-18 Championship =

International basketball competition

1978 EuroBasket Under-18
8th FIBA Europe Under-18 Championship

Tournament details
- Host country: Italy
- Teams: 12

Final positions
- Champions: Soviet Union (5th title)

The 1978 FIBA Europe Under-18 Championship was an international basketball competition held in Italy in 1980.

== Final ranking ==
1. Soviet Union

2. Spain

3. Yugoslavia

4. Bulgaria

5. Italy

6. Greece

7. Czechoslovakia

8. Turkey

9. France

10. Belgium

11. Romania

12. Poland

== Awards ==
Winners
Soviet Union
