= 2009 FIBA Europe Under-18 Championship Division B =

Tournament details
- Host country: Bosnia and Herzegovina
- Dates: July 23 – August 2
- Teams: 21 (from 1 confederation)

Final positions
- Champions: Sweden (1st title)

Official website
- www.fibaeurope.com

U18 European Championship Men 2009 - Division B was an under-18 men's basketball tournament that took place in Bosnia and Herzegovina in July/August 2009. The tournament was won by Sweden who beat Poland 87-71 in the final. Sweden and Poland were promoted to Division A.

== Final standings ==
1. Sweden
2. Poland
3. Montenegro
4. England
5. Belgium
6. Netherlands
7. Estonia
8. Bosnia and Herzegovina
9. Hungary
10. Finland
11. Austria
12. Switzerland
13. Iceland
14. Denmark
15. Georgia
16. Scotland
17. Norway
18. Portugal
19. Belarus
20. Romania
21. Slovakia
