= 2007 FIBA Europe Under-18 Championship Division B =

Tournament details
- Host country: Bulgaria
- Teams: 20

Final positions
- Champions: Belgium (1st title)

The 2007 FIBA Europe Under-18 Championship Division B was an international basketball competition held in Bulgaria in 2007.

== Final ranking ==
1. Belgium

2. Ukraine

3. Poland

4. Montenegro

5. Sweden

6. Czech Republic

7. Bosnia and Herzegovina

8. Hungary

9. Finland

10. Slovakia

11. Norway

12. Portugal

13. Austria

14. Netherlands

15. Luxembourg

16. (Republic of Ireland) Ireland

17. Denmark

18. England

19. Switzerland

20. Armenia

== Awards ==
Winners
Belgium
