= 2006 FIBA Europe Under-18 Championship Division B =

Tournament details
- Host country: Romania
- Teams: 19

Final positions
- Champions: Romania (1st title)

Official website
- www.fibaeurope.com

The 2006 FIBA Europe Under-18 Championship Division B was an international basketball competition held in Romania in 2006.

== Final ranking ==
1. Romania

2. Estonia

3. Portugal

4. England

5. Sweden

6. Poland

7. Austria

8. Belgium

9. Bosnia and Herzegovina

10. Czech Republic

11. Hungary

12. Finland

13. Norway

14. Netherlands

15. Slovakia

16. Luxembourg

17. Moldova

18. Scotland

19. (Republic of Ireland) Ireland

== Awards ==
Winners
Romania
