= Netherlands men's national under-18 basketball team =

Netherlands
- FIBA zone: FIBA Europe
- National federation: Basketball Nederland
- Coach: Paul Vervaeck
- Nickname: Orange Lions

U19 World Cup
- Appearances: None

U18 EuroBasket
- Appearances: 5
- Medals: None

U18 EuroBasket Division B
- Appearances: 19
- Medals: Gold: 2 (2018, 2026)
Home	Away

The Netherlands men's national under-18 basketball team is the national junior representative for the Netherlands in international under-18 basketball tournaments. They are governed by Basketball Nederland. The team competes at the FIBA U18 EuroBasket, mostly in Division B. The current coach is Paul Vervaeck.

In 2018, the team won its first medal when it won gold at the 2018 FIBA U18 European Championship Division B tournament. Following their victory, the Netherlands were promoted to Division A.

== Competitive record ==
=== U18 EuroBasket Division A ===
Year	Position
(Italy) 1964	Did not participate
(Italy) 1966	Did not participate
(Spain) 1968	Did not participate
(Greece) 1970	Did not participate
(Socialist Federal Republic of Yugoslavia) 1972	Did not participate
(France) 1974	12th
(Spain) 1976	Did not participate
(Italy) 1978	Did not participate
(Socialist Federal Republic of Yugoslavia) 1980	Did not participate
(Bulgaria) 1982	Did not participate
(Sweden) 1984	Did not participate
(Austria) 1986	11th
(Socialist Federal Republic of Yugoslavia) 1988	12th
(Netherlands) 1990	10th
(Hungary) 1992	Did not participate
(Israel) 1994	Did not participate
(France) 1996	Did not participate
(Bulgaria) 1998	Did not participate
(Croatia) 2000	Did not participate
(Germany) 2002	Did not participate
(Spain) 2004	Did not participate
(Serbia and Montenegro) 2005	(Division B)
(Greece) 2006	(Division B)
(Spain) 2007	(Division B)
(Greece) 2008	(Division B)
(France) 2009	(Division B)
(Lithuania) 2010	(Division B)
(Poland) 2011	(Division B)
(Lithuania) (Latvia) 2012	(Division B)
(Latvia) 2013	(Division B)
(Turkey) 2014	(Division B)
(Greece) 2015	(Division B)
(Turkey) 2016	(Division B)
(Slovakia) 2017	(Division B)
(Latvia) 2018	(Division B)
(Greece) 2019	15th
(Turkey) 2022	(Division B)
(Serbia) 2023	(Division B)
(Finland) 2024	(Division B)
(Serbia) 2025	(Division B)
(Italy) 2026	(Division B)
Total	5/41

=== U18 EuroBasket Division B ===
Year	Position
(Slovakia) 2005	6th
(Romania) 2006	14th
(Bulgaria) 2007	14th
(Hungary) 2008	9th
(Bosnia and Herzegovina) 2009	11th
(Israel) 2010	12th
(Bulgaria) 2011	6th
(Bosnia and Herzegovina) 2012	9th
(North Macedonia) 2013	8th
(Bulgaria) 2014	13th
(Austria) 2015	11th
(North Macedonia) 2016	17th
(Estonia) 2017	6th
(North Macedonia) 2018	1st
(Romania) 2019	(Division A)
(Romania) 2022	8th
(Portugal) 2023	6th
(North Macedonia) 2024	20th
(Romania) 2025	9th
(Croatia) 2026	1st
Total	19/20

== Individual awards ==
- Under-18 Championship Division B MVP
  - Nathan Kuta – 2018

== See also ==
- Netherlands men's national basketball team
- Netherlands men's national under-16 basketball team
- Netherlands women's national under-18 basketball team
