= Elliot Cadeau =

American-Swedish basketball player (born 2004)

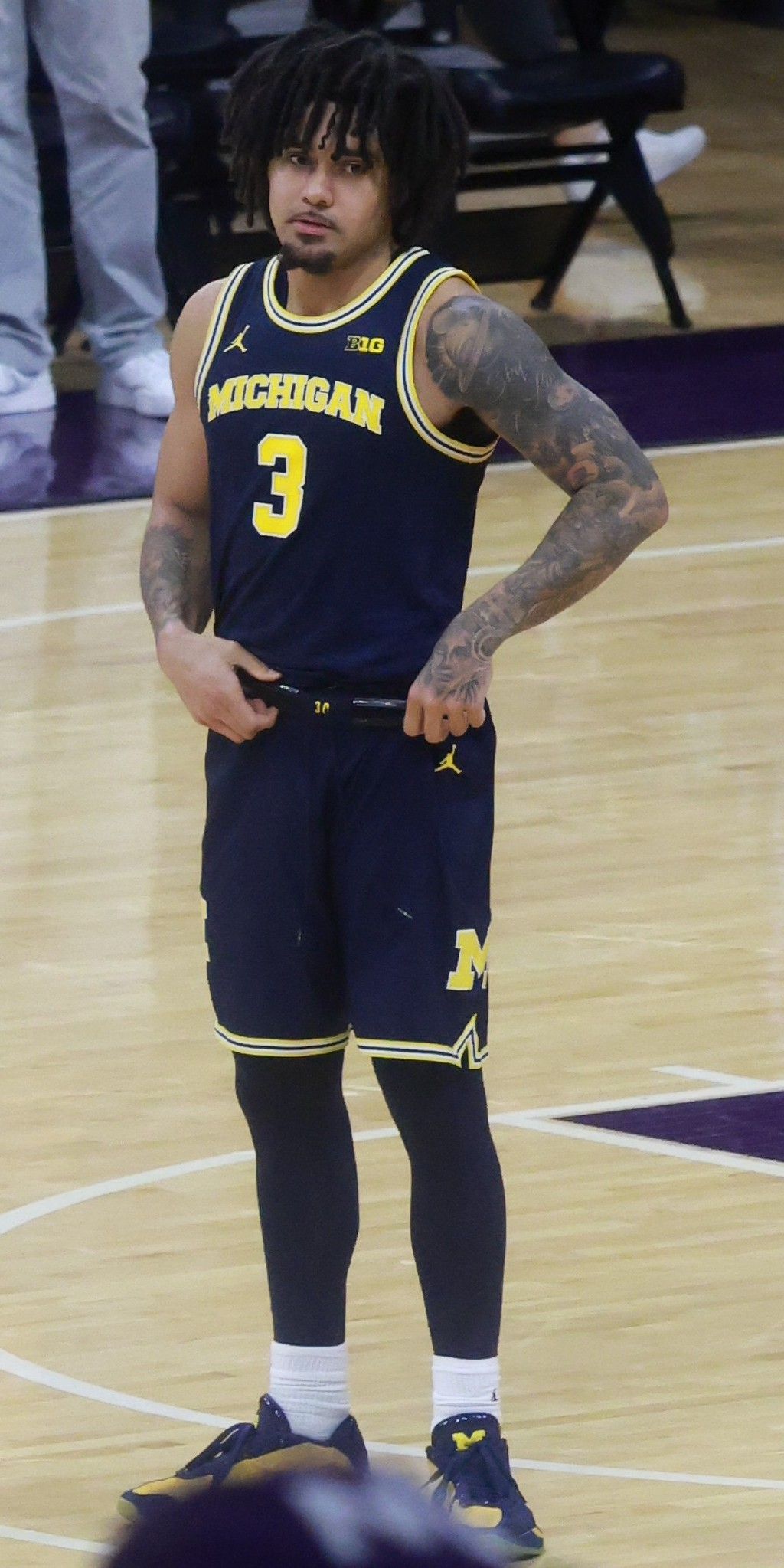
- Cadeau for the 2025–26 Michigan Wolverines

No. 3 – Michigan Wolverines
- Position: Point guard
- League: Big Ten Conference

Personal information
- Born: September 4, 2004 (age 22) Brooklyn, New York, U.S.
- Listed height: 6 ft 2 in (1.88 m)
- Listed weight: 180 lb (82 kg)

Career information
- High school: Bergen Catholic (Oradell, New Jersey); Link Academy (Branson, Missouri)
- College: North Carolina (2023–2025); Michigan (2025–present)

Career highlights
- NCAA champion (2026); NCAA Final Four Most Outstanding Player (2026); ACC All-Rookie team (2024); FIBA U18 European Championship Division B MVP (2022)
Medals
Men's basketball
Representing Sweden
FIBA Europe U18 Championship Division B
Gold medal – first place	2022 Romania	National team

Elliot Valentin Cadeau (born September 4, 2004) is an American-Swedish college basketball player for the Michigan Wolverines of the Big Ten Conference. He was an NCAA national champion and the Final Four Most Outstanding Player in 2026. Cadeau previously played for the North Carolina Tar Heels for his first two seasons. He was born in the United States, but represents Sweden internationally. After several years representing Sweden at the youth level, he made his senior national team debut in 2023.

== Early life ==
Cadeau was born in Brooklyn, New York, and raised in West Orange, New Jersey. His father, James, is Haitian while his mother, Michelle, is Swedish, hailing from Skåne. As a child he loved football and was a fan of the New York Jets, but he was discouraged from playing the sport because his mother thought it was too dangerous, and suggested he try out for a basketball team instead. He also played baseball, soccer and tennis, but decided to focus on basketball in fifth grade.

Cadeau attended The Patrick School in Hillside, New Jersey, for seventh and eighth grade. During this time he helped his club team, Sports U/Team IZOD, win the 2019 Under Armour Nationals.

== High school career ==
Cadeau began his high school career at Bergen Catholic High School in Oradell, New Jersey. He served as the Crusaders' starting point guard during his freshman season, which was shortened due to the COVID-19 pandemic. Cadeau averaged 11.3 points, 4.6 rebounds and 4.2 assists per game, leading his team to a 7–2 record. He was named to the MaxPreps Freshman All-American First Team. Cadeau missed his entire sophomore season due to a high ankle sprain he suffered during a scrimmage against Gill St. Bernard's School in December 2021. He transferred to Link Academy in Branson, Missouri, ahead of his junior year.

Cadeau played AAU basketball for the New Heights Lightning on the Nike Elite Youth Basketball League (EYBL) circuit. He was named to the EYBL All-Underclassman team in 2021, and earned All-EYBL Third Team honors in 2022.

=== Recruiting ===
Before his reclassification, Cadeau was widely regarded as the top point guard in the class of 2024. Even after reclassifying to the 2023 class, he was a unanimous five-star recruit.

In September 2022, Cadeau took his first official visit to Texas Tech, which he described as his dream school growing up. This was followed by a visit to North Carolina the following month. On December 28, 2022, Cadeau committed to coach Hubert Davis of North Carolina.

He made his reclassification official on May 30, 2023, after weeks of speculation, in part due to his stellar play in the GEICO Nationals and on the EYBL circuit.

College recruiting
Name	Hometown	School	Height	Weight	Commit date
Elliot Cadeau; PG	West Orange, NJ	Link Academy	6 ft 1 in (1.85 m)	165 lb (75 kg)	Dec 28, 2022
Elliot Cadeau; PG	Recruit ratings: Rivals: 247Sports: ESPN: (91)				
Overall recruit ranking: Rivals: 8 247Sports: 11 ESPN: 13
Note: In many cases, Scout, Rivals, 247Sports, On3, and ESPN may conflict in their listings of height and weight.; In these cases, the average was taken. ESPN grades are on a 100-point scale.; Sources: "2023 Team Ranking". Rivals.

== College career ==
=== North Carolina ===
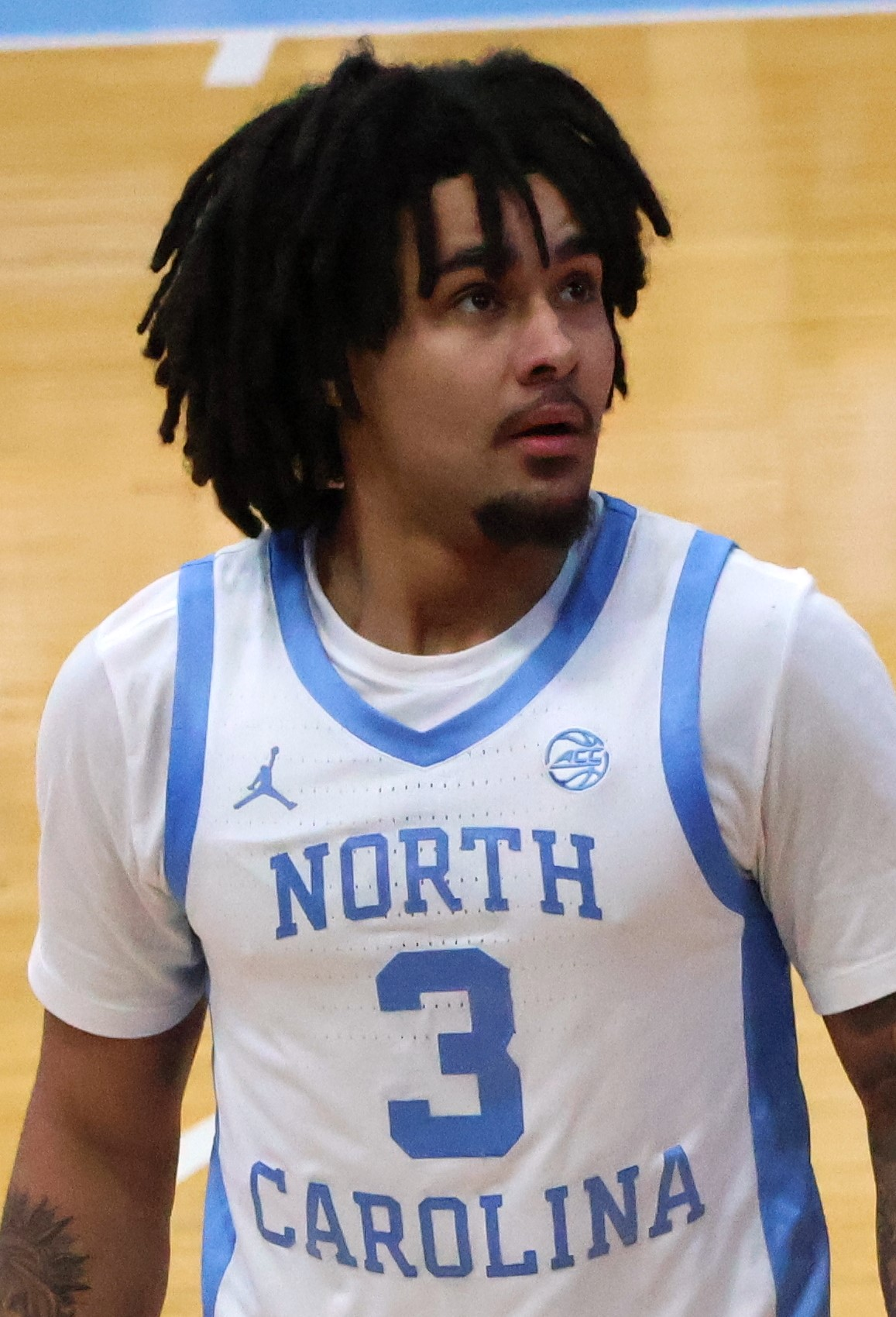
Cadeau with the 2024–25 Tar Heels

Cadeau enrolled at the University of North Carolina at Chapel Hill in 2023 and was named the Atlantic Coast Conference (ACC) Preseason Freshman of the year. In the fourth game of the season for the 2023–24 Tar Heels on November 22, 2023 Battle 4 Atlantis quarterfinal victory against Northern Iowa, Cadeau posted 15 points. Exactly one week later, he posted 10 assists with no turnovers as number 17 UNC defeated number 10 Tennessee in the ACC–SEC Challenge. On February 10, 2024, he scored a career-high 19 points and posted a career-high 4 steals with eight assists against Miami. Cadeau finished his freshman season averaging 7.3 points and 4.1 assists per game. He was selected to the ACC All-Freshman Team.

As a sophomore, Cadeau began the season with double digit scoring performances in his first 7 games for the 2024–25 Tar Heels. On December 29 against Campbell, he posted 12 points along with a career-high 12 assists to earn his first career double-double. On January 21, 2025, he scored 14 points with a then career-high 13 assists against Wake Forest. For the season averaged 9.4 points per game and was second in the ACC with 6.2 assists per game. On March 25, 2025, Cadeau entered the NCAA transfer portal after starting 68 games in his first two collegiate seasons at North Carolina.

=== Michigan ===
On March 31, 2025, Cadeau transferred to the University of Michigan to play for head coach Dusty May. He was named to the preseason Bob Cousy Award watchlist. On November 3 against Oakland, Cadeau led the 2025–26 Wolverines with a career-high 14 assists in his debut; the most in any game for a Wolverine since Mike Smith in 2021. On November 11 against Wake Forest, he followed his debut with 17 points, a career-high eight rebounds, and seven assists. Cadeau matched his 19-point career high multiple times with Michigan: On January 10 in the team's first loss of the season against Wisconsin, he posted all 19 points in the first half of the 91–88 loss, and he started out hot again 10 days later scoring 10 of the team's first 12 points on the way to 19 points against Indiana. Following the regular season he was an All-Big Ten honorable mention by the media. In the 2026 NCAA tournament, he was named to the Midwest All-Region team, leading Michigan to the Final Four. He had at least seven assists in each of the first four games of the tournament and surpassed 1,000 career points in the process. He again posted 19 points in the April 6, 2026 NCAA Division I men's basketball championship game against UConn. After Michigan won the 2026 national championship, Cadeau was named the NCAA tournament's Most Outstanding Player.

On April 24, after signing a deal to return to Michigan as a senior, Cadeau declared for the 2026 NBA draft, while maintaining his NCAA eligibility through the draft process. On May 16, he withdrew from the draft, using the process as a learning experience for the future. Ahead of his senior season, Cadeau was selected to the Preseason All-Big Ten team, which featured 11 members. He was joined by teammate Trey McKenney as the program’s 25th and 26th players to have ever been selected. He was also selected as a first-team All-Big Ten selection by the media, receiving the fourth most total votes.

Cadeau posted back-to-back double doubles with 17 points and 10 assists on November 11 against Marquette and with his 11-point, 11-assist effort in the November 15 game against William & Mary contributing to the team's all-time record 75-point half and record 8 double-digit scorers.

== National team career ==
=== Junior teams ===
Cadeau played a tournament in Sweden with his middle school team and caught the attention of the country's national team coaches when they discovered he had Swedish heritage. He was invited to the national under-15 team training camp and helped the team take first place at the 2019 North Sea Development Basketball Cup held in Denmark, averaging 9.3 points, 2.7 rebounds and 1.7 assists per game. Cadeau was subsequently called up to the national under-16 team ahead of the 2020 Baltic Sea Basketball Cup held in Estonia, where he helped Sweden win the gold medal.

Cadeau led the national under-18 team to a gold medal at the 2021 Under-18 Nordic Championships. He was unable to repeat this feat at the following year's edition, where Sweden finished fourth. In the opening game against Estonia, Cadeau recorded 40 points, seven rebounds and five steals. He was named the MVP of the tournament.

Cadeau helped Sweden win a gold medal at the 2022 FIBA U18 European Championship Division B in Romania, averaging 21.3 points, 4.3 rebounds, and 4.0 assists per game. He recorded 36 points, five rebounds, four assists, and four steals in the championship game victory against Denmark, earning tournament MVP honors.

=== Senior team ===
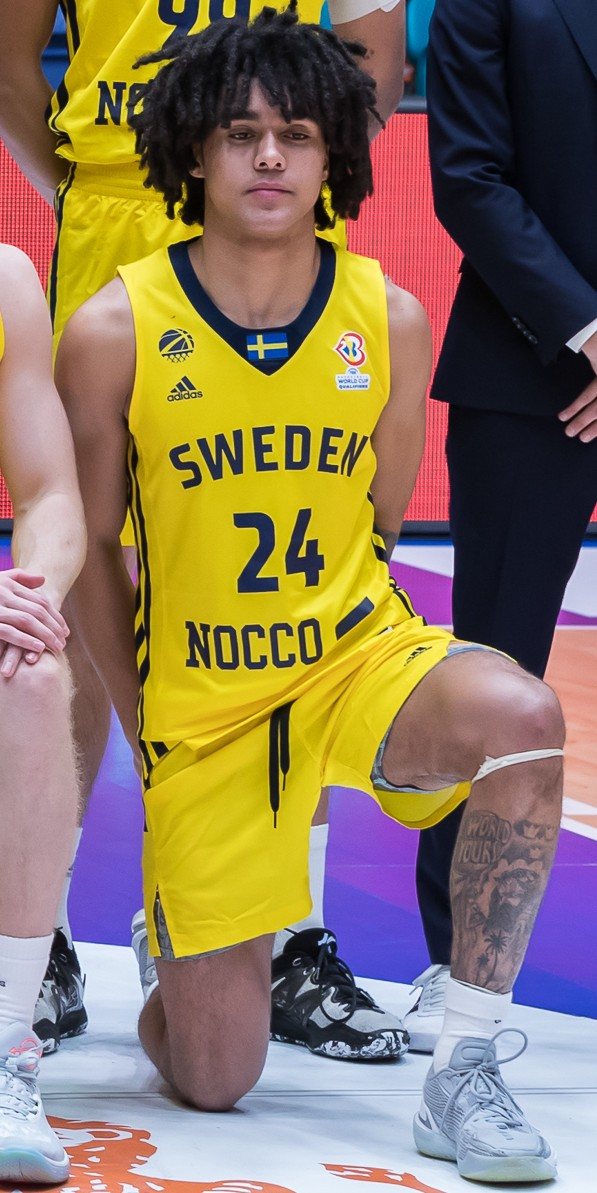
Cadeau in February 2023

Cadeau received his first call-up to the senior national team in November 2021 ahead of a pair of FIBA World Cup qualifiers against Finland and Slovenia. Being that he was only 17 years old, he called the decision completely unexpected.

Cadeau made his senior debut on 24 February 2023 against Germany in a 2023 World Cup qualifying game in Frankfurt, and he recorded four points and one steal in seven minutes of play.

== Career statistics ==
Legend
GP	Games played	GS	Games started	MPG	Minutes per game
FG%	Field goal percentage	3P%	3-point field goal percentage	FT%	Free throw percentage
RPG	Rebounds per game	APG	Assists per game	SPG	Steals per game
BPG	Blocks per game	PPG	Points per game	**Bold**	Career high

=== College ===
Year	Team	GP	GS	MPG	FG%	3P%	FT%	RPG	APG	SPG	BPG	PPG
2023–24	North Carolina	37	31	23.8	.417	.189	.648	2.2	4.1	0.8	0.1	7.3
2024–25	North Carolina	37	37	27.8	.445	.337	.670	2.9	6.2	1.1	0.3	9.4
2025–26	Michigan	40	40	27.3	.411	.376	.709	2.7	5.9	0.9	0.2	10.5
**Career**		**114**	**108**	**26.3**	**.424**	**.333**	**.679**	**2.6**	**5.4**	**0.9**	**0.2**	**9.1**

== Personal life ==
Cadeau comes from an athletic family. His father was an avid tennis player while his older brother, Justin, played college tennis at Howard. Justin is also a popular Twitch streamer who broadcasts under the pseudonym "Saucekill", with Elliot frequently appearing as a guest on his streams. Cadeau also has congenital hearing loss and is deaf in his right ear. Cadeau is also a part-time music producer for artists, specifically those in the underground rap scene, he goes under the pseudonym ripsodivine.

=== Social media and endorsements ===
On January 1, 2022, Cadeau became the first high school basketball player to sign with Roc Nation Sports for Name, Image and Likeness (NIL) representation.

In April 2022, he signed an endorsement deal with Swedish vitamin drink Vitamin Well, becoming the first American high school athlete to sign an international NIL deal. He also has deals with Leaf Trading Cards, Wilson Sporting Goods, and Swedish company Flowlife. In addition, he has his own clothing line called Elliot Cadeau Wear.

== See also ==
- Michigan Wolverines men's basketball statistical leaders
- North Carolina Tar Heels men's basketball statistical leaders
