= Kosovo men's national under-18 basketball team =

Kosovo
- Joined FIBA: 2015
- FIBA zone: FIBA Europe
- National federation: Federata e Basketbollit të Kosovës (FBK)
- Coach: Ibrahim Karabeg
- Nickname: Dardanët (Dardanians)

U19 World Cup
- Appearances: None

U18 EuroBasket
- Appearances: None

U18 EuroBasket Division B
- Appearances: 5
- Medals: None

U18 EuroBasket Division C
- Appearances: 4
- Medals: Gold: 2 (2018, 2026); Bronze: 1 (2016)
| Home | Away |

The Kosovo men's national under-18 basketball team (Albanian: Kombëtarja e basketbollit të Kosovës nën 18 vjeç, Serbian: Кошаркашкa репрезентација Косова до 18. године, romanized: Košarkaška reprezentacija Kosova do 18. godine) is a national basketball team of Kosovo, administered by the Basketball Federation of Kosovo. It represents the country in international under-18 men's basketball competitions.

== Competitive record ==
=== FIBA U18 EuroBasket Division A ===
FIBA U18 EuroBasket Division A record
| Year | Round | Pos | Pld | W | L | Ref |
|---|---|---|---|---|---|---|
| (Italy) 1964 to (Bulgaria) 1998 | Part of Yugoslavia and Serbia and Montenegro | | | | | |
| (Croatia) 2000 to (Turkey) 2014 | Not a FIBA Europe member | | | | | |
| (Greece) 2015 | Did not enter | | | | | |
| (Turkey) 2016 to (Italy) 2026 | Did not qualify | | | | | |
| Total | — | 0/41 | 0 | 0 | 0 | — |

=== FIBA U18 EuroBasket Division B ===
FIBA U18 EuroBasket Division B record
| Year | Round | Pos | Pld | W | L | Ref |
|---|---|---|---|---|---|---|
| (Slovakia) 2005 to (Bulgaria) 2014 | Not a FIBA Europe member | | | | | |
| (Austria) 2015 | Did not enter | | | | | |
| (North Macedonia) 2016 to (North Macedonia) 2018 | Did not qualify | | | | | |
| (Romania) 2019 | Class. round | 23rd | 8 | 1 | 7 | |
| (Romania) 2022 | Class. round | 21st | 7 | 1 | 6 | |
| (Portugal) 2023 | Class. round | 21st | 7 | 1 | 6 | |
| (North Macedonia) 2024 | Class. round | 21st | 7 | 1 | 6 | |
| (Romania) 2025 | Class. round | 22nd | 7 | 0 | 7 | |
| (Croatia) 2026 | Did not qualify | | | | | |
| Total | — | 5/20 | 36 | 4 | 32 | — |

=== FIBA U18 EuroBasket Division C ===
FIBA U18 EuroBasket Division C record
| Year | Round | Pos | Pld | W | L | Ref |
|---|---|---|---|---|---|---|
| (Andorra) 1997 to (Luxembourg) 1999 | Part of Serbia and Montenegro | | | | | |
| (Malta) 2001 to (Andorra) 2014 | Not a FIBA Europe member | | | | | |
| (Gibraltar) 2015 | Did not enter | | | | | |
| (San Marino) 2016 | Third place | 3rd | 6 | 5 | 1 | |
| (Cyprus) 2017 | Group stage | 5th | 3 | 1 | 2 | |
| (Kosovo) 2018 | Champions | 1st | 5 | 4 | 1 | |
| (Andorra) 2019 to (Albania) 2025 | Played in Division B | | | | | |
| (Albania) 2026 | Champions | 1st | 5 | 5 | 0 | |
| Total | 2 titles | 4/20 | 19 | 15 | 4 | — |

== Team ==
=== 2026 roster ===
The following is the Kosovo roster that were called up for the 2026 FIBA U18 EuroBasket Division C.

Kosovo national under-18 basketball team roster
Players
Coaches

| Pos. | No. | Name | Age – Date of birth | Height | Club | Ctr. |
|---|---|---|---|---|---|---|
| PG | 0 | Lis Binishi | 17 – 30 July 2008 | 1.80 m (5 ft 11 in) | The Patrick School | (United States) |
| F | 1 | Diar Libusha | 16 – 1 September 2009 | 2.02 m (6 ft 8 in) | Peja | (Kosovo) |
| PG | 2 | Fis Jashari | 18 – 12 April 2008 | 1.80 m (5 ft 11 in) | Bashkimi | (Kosovo) |
| F | 5 | Enes Gashi | 17 – 7 January 2009 | 1.95 m (6 ft 5 in) | Kerasan | (Kosovo) |
| SG | 6 | Renat Sylejmani | 17 – 3 October 2008 | 1.91 m (6 ft 3 in) | Prishtina e Re | (Kosovo) |
| SF | 7 | Rubin Shala | 18 – 3 April 2008 | 2.00 m (6 ft 7 in) | Borea | (Kosovo) |
| SG | 9 | Blin Aliu | 16 – 24 July 2009 | 1.83 m (6 ft 0 in) | Kerasan | (Kosovo) |
| SG | 10 | Besim Bytyqi | 17 – 31 October 2008 | 1.85 m (6 ft 1 in) | Bashkimi | (Kosovo) |
| PG | 12 | Yll Kastrati | 18 – 19 May 2008 | 1.85 m (6 ft 1 in) | Kerasan | (Kosovo) |
| C | 18 | Venis Haliti | 18 – 15 July 2008 | 2.06 m (6 ft 9 in) | Trepça | (Kosovo) |
| PF | 34 | Artin Emini | 18 – 1 March 2008 | 1.97 m (6 ft 6 in) | Kerasan | (Kosovo) |
| C | 35 | Halim Lebovci | 17 – 8 August 2008 | 2.02 m (6 ft 8 in) | Bora | (Kosovo) |

Head coach

- (Kosovo) Endrit Elshani

Assistant coach(es)

- (Kosovo) Ermal Selmani

Legend

- Age – describes age,
  on 21 July 2026

== See also ==
- Kosovo men's national basketball team
- Kosovo men's national under-16 basketball team
- Kosovo women's national under-18 basketball team
