= Israel men's national under-18 basketball team =

Israel
- FIBA zone: FIBA Europe
- National federation: Israel Basketball Association

U19 World Cup
- Appearances: 1
- Medals: None

U18 EuroBasket
- Appearances: 24
- Medals: None

U18 EuroBasket Division B
- Appearances: 9
- Medals: Gold: 1 (2019); Silver: 1 (2015)

The Israel men's national under-18 and under-19 basketball team is a junior national basketball team of Israel, administered by the Israel Basketball Association. It represents the country in international under-18 and under-19 men's basketball competitions.

The team won the gold medal at the 2019 FIBA U18 European Championship Division B.

== Participation in FIBA competitions ==
=== FIBA Under-19 World Cup ===
Year	Pos.	GP	W	L	Ref.
(Brazil) 1979	Did not qualify				
(Spain) 1983	Did not qualify				
(Italy) 1987	Did not qualify				
(Canada) 1991	Did not qualify				
(Greece) 1995	Did not qualify				
(Portugal) 1999	Did not qualify				
(Greece) 2003	Did not qualify				
(Serbia) 2007	Did not qualify				
(New Zealand) 2009	Did not qualify				
(Latvia) 2011	Did not qualify				
(Czech Republic) 2013	Did not qualify				
(Greece) 2015	Did not qualify				
(Egypt) 2017	Did not qualify				
(Greece) 2019	Did not qualify				
(Latvia) 2021	Did not qualify				
(Hungary) 2023	Did not qualify				
(Switzerland) 2025	7th	7	5	2	
(Czech Republic) 2027	Did not qualify				
(Indonesia) 2029	To be determined				

=== FIBA U18 EuroBasket ===
Division A						Division B					
Year	Pos.	GP	W	L	Ref.	Year	Pos.	GP	W	L	Ref.
(Italy) 1964	Did not compete										
(Italy) 1966	Did not compete										
(Spain) 1968	7th	8	4	4							
(Greece) 1970	Did not compete										
(Socialist Federal Republic of Yugoslavia) 1972	4th	7	4	3							
(France) 1974	11th	9	3	6							
(Spain) 1976	8th	8	2	6							
(Italy) 1978	Did not compete										
(Socialist Federal Republic of Yugoslavia) 1980	7th	7	3	4							
(Bulgaria) 1982	9th	7	3	4							
(Sweden) 1984	Did not compete										
(Austria) 1986	Did not compete										
(Socialist Federal Republic of Yugoslavia) 1988	10th	7	2	5							
(Netherlands) 1990	Did not compete										
(Hungary) 1992	5th	7	5	2							
(Israel) 1994	10th	7	3	4							
(France) 1996	Did not qualify										
(Bulgaria) 1998	6th	8	5	3							
(Croatia) 2000	10th	7	3	4							
(Germany) 2002	6th	8	4	4							
(Spain) 2004	8th	8	3	5							
(Serbia and Montenegro) 2005	7th	8	3	5							
(Greece) 2006	11th	8	5	3							
(Spain) 2007	11th	8	3	5							
(Greece) 2008	10th	8	4	4							
(France) 2009	15th	6	2	4							
(Lithuania) 2010	Did not qualify					(Israel) 2010	4th	9	6	3	
(Poland) 2011	Did not qualify					(Bulgaria) 2011	7th	8	5	3	
(Lithuania) (Latvia) 2012	Did not qualify					(Bosnia and Herzegovina) 2012	7th	9	7	2	
(Latvia) 2013	Did not qualify					(North Macedonia) 2013	5th	9	7	2	
(Turkey) 2014	Did not qualify					(Germany) 2014	6th	9	6	3	
(Greece) 2015	Did not qualify					(Austria) 2015	2nd place, silver medalist(s)	10	8	2	
(North Macedonia) 2016	15th	6	1	5							
(Slovakia) 2017	Did not qualify					(Estonia) 2017	4th	8	6	2	
(Latvia) 2018	Did not qualify					(North Macedonia) 2018	9th	8	7	1	
(Greece) 2019	Did not qualify					(Romania) 2019	1st place, gold medalist(s)	8	8	0	
(Turkey) 2022	8th	7	3	4							
(Serbia) 2023	6th	7	4	3							
(Finland) 2024	4th	7	3	4							
(Serbia) 2025	10th	7	3	4							
(Italy) 2026	7th	7	5	2							

== See also ==
- Israel men's national basketball team
- Israel men's national under-16 basketball team
- Israel women's national under-19 basketball team
