= Georgia men's national under-18 basketball team =

Georgia
- FIBA zone: FIBA Europe
- National federation: Georgian Basketball Federation

U19 World Cup
- Appearances: None

U18 EuroBasket
- Appearances: 1
- Medals: None

U18 EuroBasket Division B
- Appearances: 17
- Medals: None

The Georgia men's national under-18 basketball team is a national basketball team of Georgia, administered by the Georgian Basketball Federation. It represents the country in international under-18 men's basketball competitions.

== FIBA U18 EuroBasket record ==
| Division A | | | | | | Division B | | | | | |
| Year | Pos. | Pld. | W | L | Ref. | Year | Pos. | Pld. | W | L | Ref. |
|---|---|---|---|---|---|---|---|---|---|---|---|
| 1964–1992 | Part of the Soviet Union | | | | | 1964–2004 | Not held | | | | |
| (Israel) 1994 | Did not qualify | | | | | 1964–2004 | Not held | | | | |
| (France) 1996 | Did not participate | | | | | 1964–2004 | Not held | | | | |
| (Bulgaria) 1998 | Did not qualify | | | | | 1964–2004 | Not held | | | | |
| (Croatia) 2000 | Did not qualify | | | | | 1964–2004 | Not held | | | | |
| (Germany) 2002 | Did not participate | | | | | 1964–2004 | Not held | | | | |
| (Spain) 2004 | 11th | 7 | 2 | 5 | | 1964–2004 | Not held | | | | |
| (Serbia and Montenegro) 2005 | Did not participate | | | | | (Slovakia) 2005 | Did not participate | | | | |
| (Greece) 2006 | Did not participate | | | | | (Romania) 2006 | Did not participate | | | | |
| (Spain) 2007 | Did not participate | | | | | (Bulgaria) 2007 | Did not participate | | | | |
| (Greece) 2008 | (Played in Division B) | | | | | (Hungary) 2008 | 13th | 8 | 5 | 3 | |
| (France) 2009 | (Played in Division B) | | | | | (Bosnia and Herzegovina) 2009 | 15th | 8 | 3 | 5 | |
| (Lithuania) 2010 | (Played in Division B) | | | | | (Israel) 2010 | 19th | 7 | 1 | 6 | |
| (Poland) 2011 | (Played in Division B) | | | | | (Bulgaria) 2011 | 15th | 7 | 3 | 4 | |
| (Lithuania) (Latvia) 2012 | (Played in Division B) | | | | | (Bosnia and Herzegovina) 2012 | 17th | 7 | 3 | 4 | |
| (Latvia) 2013 | (Played in Division B) | | | | | (North Macedonia) 2013 | 21st | 7 | 1 | 6 | |
| (Turkey) 2014 | (Played in Division B) | | | | | (Germany) 2014 | 20th | 7 | 1 | 6 | |
| (Greece) 2015 | (Played in Division B) | | | | | (Austria) 2015 | 8th | 9 | 5 | 4 | |
| (North Macedonia) 2016 | (Played in Division B) | | | | | (North Macedonia) 2016 | 10th | 8 | 6 | 2 | |
| (Slovakia) 2017 | (Played in Division B) | | | | | (Estonia) 2017 | 18th | 8 | 2 | 6 | |
| (Latvia) 2018 | (Played in Division B) | | | | | (North Macedonia) 2018 | 21st | 8 | 3 | 5 | |
| (Greece) 2019 | (Played in Division B) | | | | | (Romania) 2019 | 8th | 8 | 4 | 4 | |
| (Turkey) 2022 | (Played in Division B) | | | | | (Romania) 2022 | 15th | 8 | 4 | 4 | |
| (Serbia) 2023 | (Played in Division B) | | | | | (Portugal) 2023 | 19th | 7 | 2 | 5 | |
| (Finland) 2024 | (Played in Division B) | | | | | (North Macedonia) 2024 | 16th | 7 | 2 | 5 | |
| (Serbia) 2025 | (Played in Division B) | | | | | (Romania) 2025 | 12th | 8 | 3 | 5 | |
| (Italy) 2026 | (Played in Division B) | | | | | (Croatia) 2026 | 7th | 7 | 4 | 3 | |

== See also ==
- Georgia men's national basketball team
- Georgia men's national under-16 basketball team
- Georgia women's national under-18 basketball team
