= North Macedonia men's national under-18 basketball team =

Youth national basketball team of North Macedonia

North Macedonia
- FIBA zone: FIBA Europe
- National federation: Basketball Federation of North Macedonia

U19 World Cup
- Appearances: None

U18 EuroBasket
- Appearances: 2
- Medals: None

U18 EuroBasket Division B
- Appearances: 11
- Medals: Gold: 1 (2024)
Home	Away

The North Macedonia men's national under-18 basketball team is a national basketball team of North Macedonia, administered by the Basketball Federation of North Macedonia. It represents the country in international under-18 men's basketball competitions.

== FIBA U18 EuroBasket participations ==
Year	Division A	Division B
2005		12th
2013		4th
2014		15th
2015		21st
2016		16th
2017		16th
2018		18th

Year	Division A	Division B
2019		4th
2022	14th	
2023		16th
2024		1st place, gold medalist(s)
2025	14th	
2026		14th

== See also ==
- North Macedonia men's national basketball team
- North Macedonia men's national under-16 basketball team
- North Macedonia women's national under-18 basketball team
