= Latvia men's national under-19 basketball team =

Latvia
- FIBA zone: FIBA Europe
- National federation: Latvian Basketball Association
- Coach: (Latvia) Nikolajs Mazurs

U19 World Cup
- Appearances: 4
- Medals: None

U18 EuroBasket
- Appearances: 22
- Medals: Silver: 1 (2018); Bronze: 2 (2007, 2010)

U18 EuroBasket Division B
- Appearances: 2
- Medals: Gold: 1 (2023)
Home	Away

The Latvia men's national under-18 and under-19 basketball team (Latvian: Nacionālā basketbola komanda zēniem līdz 18 un jaunākiem par 19 gadiem) is the national representative for Latvia in international under-18 and under-19 men's basketball competitions. They are organized by the Latvian Basketball Association.

== Championships record ==
=== FIBA U18 EuroBasket ===
Year	Position
(Hungary) 1992	Did not participate
(Israel) 1994	Did not qualify
(France) 1996	Did not qualify
(Bulgaria) 1998	4th
(Croatia) 2000	8th
(Germany) 2002	11th
(Spain) 2004	12th
(Serbia) 2005	8th
(Greece) 2006	12th
(Spain) 2007	3rd
(Greece) 2008	7th
(France) 2009	9th
(Lithuania) 2010	3rd
(Poland) 2011	10th
(Lithuania) 2012	6th
(Latvia) 2013	4th
(Turkey) 2014	8th
(Greece) 2015	10th
(Turkey) 2016	13th
(Slovakia) 2017	16th
(Latvia) 2018	2nd
(Greece) 2019	16th
(Turkey) 2022	(Division B)
(Serbia) 2023	(Division B)
(Finland) 2024	12th
(Serbia) 2025	4th
(Italy) 2026	14th

=== FIBA U18 EuroBasket Division B ===
Year	Position
(Romania) 2022	13th
(Portugal) 2023	1st

=== FIBA U19 World Cup ===
Year	Position
(Greece) 1995	Did not qualify
(Portugal) 1999	9th
(Greece) 2003	Did not qualify
(Serbia) 2007	Did not qualify
(New Zealand) 2009	Did not qualify
(Latvia) 2011	10th
(Czech Republic) 2013	Did not qualify
(Greece) 2015	Did not qualify
(Egypt) 2017	Did not qualify
(Greece) 2019	12th
(Latvia) 2021	11th
(Hungary) 2023	Did not qualify
(Switzerland) 2025	Did not qualify
(Czech Republic) 2027	Did not qualify
(Indonesia) 2029	TBD

== See also ==
- Latvia men's national basketball team
- Latvia men's national under-20 basketball team
- Latvia men's national under-17 basketball team
- Latvia women's national under-19 basketball team
