= Danish Basketball Association =

Governing body of basketball in Denmark

- Sport: Basketball
- Jurisdiction: Denmark
- Abbreviation: DBBF
- Founded: 1947
- Affiliation: FIBA
- Regional affiliation: FIBA Europe
- Headquarters: Brøndbyvester

Official website
- www.basket.dk
- (Denmark)

The Danish Basketball Association (Danish: Danmarks Basketball Forbund) also known as DBBF is the governing body of basketball in Denmark. It was founded in 1947, and they became members of FIBA in 1951.

The Danish Basketball Association operates the Danish men's national team and Danish women's national team. They organize national competitions in Denmark, for both the men's and women's senior teams and also the youth national basketball teams.

The top professional league in Denmark is Basketligaen

== See also ==
- Denmark national basketball team
- Denmark national under-19 basketball team
- Denmark national under-17 basketball team
- Denmark women's national basketball team
- Denmark women's national under-19 basketball team
- Denmark women's national under-17 basketball team
