= 2022 FIBA U18 European Championship Division B =

Basketball championship

Tournament details
- Host country: Romania
- Cities: Ploiești, Blejoi, Bucov
- Dates: 29 July – 7 August 2022
- Teams: 22 (from 1 confederation)
- Venues: 3 (in 3 host cities)

Final positions
- Champions: Sweden (3rd title)
- Runners-up: Denmark
- Third place: Finland
- Fourth place: Iceland

Tournament statistics
- MVP: (Sweden) Elliot Cadeau

Official website
- www.fiba.basketball

The 2022 FIBA U18 European Championship Division B was the 16th edition of the Division B of the European basketball championship for national under-18 teams. It was played from 29 July to 7 August 2022 in Ploiești, Blejoi and Bucov, Romania. Sweden men's national under-18 basketball team won the tournament.

== Participating teams ==
- Austria
- Belgium
- Bosnia and Herzegovina
- Bulgaria
- Cyprus ▲ (Winners, 2019 FIBA U18 European Championship Division C)
- Denmark
- Estonia
- Finland ▼ (14th place, 2019 FIBA U18 European Championship Division A)
- Georgia
- Hungary
- Iceland
- Ireland
- Kosovo
- Latvia ▼ (16th place, 2019 FIBA U18 European Championship Division A)
- Netherlands ▼ (15th place, 2019 FIBA U18 European Championship Division A)
- Norway
- Portugal
- Romania
- Slovakia
- Sweden
- Switzerland
- Ukraine

== First round ==
The draw of the first round was held on 15 February 2022 in Freising, Germany.

In the first round, the teams were drawn into four groups. The first two teams from each group advance to the quarterfinals; the third and fourth teams advance to the 9th–16th place playoffs; the other teams will play in the 17th–22nd place classification groups.

=== Group A ===
Pos	Team	Pld	W	L	PF	PA	PD	Pts	Qualification
1	Denmark	4	4	0	325	259	+66	8	Quarterfinals
2	Iceland	4	3	1	371	310	+61	7	Quarterfinals
3	Ukraine	4	2	2	279	277	+2	6	9th–16th place playoffs
4	Estonia	4	1	3	296	320	−24	5	9th–16th place playoffs
5	Ireland	4	0	4	268	373	−105	4	17th–22nd place classification

Source: FIBA

29 July 2022

Boxscore

Denmark	87–75	Iceland

Olimpia Hall, Ploiești

29 July 2022

Boxscore

Estonia	82–64	Ireland

Olimpia Hall, Ploiești

30 July 2022

Boxscore

Ukraine	55–71	Denmark

Bucov

30 July 2022

Boxscore

Iceland	105–91	Estonia

Bucov

31 July 2022

Boxscore

Ireland	80–103	Iceland

Sala Polivalenta Blejoi, Blejoi

31 July 2022

Boxscore

Estonia	53–70	Ukraine

Sala Polivalenta Blejoi, Blejoi

2 August 2022

Boxscore

Denmark	81–70	Estonia

Olimpia Hall, Ploiești

2 August 2022

Boxscore

Ukraine	102–65	Ireland

Olimpia Hall, Ploiești

3 August 2022

Boxscore

Iceland	88–52	Ukraine

Bucov

3 August 2022

Boxscore

Ireland	59–86	Denmark

Bucov

=== Group B ===
Pos	Team	Pld	W	L	PF	PA	PD	Pts	Qualification
1	Bosnia and Herzegovina	5	4	1	431	361	+70	9	Quarterfinals
2	Netherlands	5	3	2	334	335	−1	8	Quarterfinals
3	Bulgaria	5	3	2	378	341	+37	8	9th–16th place playoffs
4	Georgia	5	3	2	349	309	+40	8	9th–16th place playoffs
5	Norway	5	2	3	304	328	−24	7	17th–22nd place classification
6	Kosovo	5	0	5	277	399	−122	5	17th–22nd place classification

Source: FIBA

29 July 2022

Boxscore

Kosovo	60–87	Georgia

Sala Polivalenta Blejoi, Blejoi

29 July 2022

Boxscore

Norway	74–56	Netherlands

Sala Polivalenta Blejoi, Blejoi

29 July 2022

Boxscore

Bosnia and Herzegovina	90–89	Bulgaria

Sala Polivalenta Blejoi, Blejoi

30 July 2022

Boxscore

Georgia	71–51	Norway

Olimpia Hall, Ploiești

30 July 2022

Boxscore

Netherlands	71–99	Bosnia and Herzegovina

Olimpia Hall, Ploiești

30 July 2022

Boxscore

Bulgaria	85–65	Kosovo

Sala Polivalenta Blejoi, Blejoi

31 July 2022

Boxscore

Kosovo	44–78	Netherlands

Bucov

31 July 2022

Boxscore

Bulgaria	64–60	Georgia

Bucov

31 July 2022

Boxscore

Bosnia and Herzegovina	77–64	Norway

Bucov

2 August 2022

Boxscore

Norway	59–50	Kosovo

Sala Polivalenta Blejoi, Blejoi

2 August 2022

Boxscore

Netherlands	70–66	Bulgaria

Sala Polivalenta Blejoi, Blejoi

2 August 2022

Boxscore

Georgia	79–75	Bosnia and Herzegovina

Sala Polivalenta Blejoi, Blejoi

3 August 2022

Boxscore

Netherlands	59–52	Georgia

Olimpia Hall, Ploiești

3 August 2022

Boxscore

Kosovo	58–90	Bosnia and Herzegovina

Olimpia Hall, Ploiești

3 August 2022

Boxscore

Bulgaria	74–56	Norway

Olimpia Hall, Ploiești

=== Group C ===
Pos	Team	Pld	W	L	PF	PA	PD	Pts	Qualification
1	Romania	5	4	1	351	291	+60	9	Quarterfinals
2	Portugal	5	4	1	330	250	+80	9	Quarterfinals
3	Latvia	5	2	3	336	349	−13	7	9th–16th place playoffs
4	Hungary	5	2	3	302	289	+13	7	9th–16th place playoffs
5	Slovakia	5	2	3	303	333	−30	7	17th–22nd place classification
6	Switzerland	5	1	4	261	371	−110	6	17th–22nd place classification

Source: FIBA

29 July 2022

Boxscore

Switzerland	75–73	Latvia

Sala Polivalenta Blejoi, Blejoi

29 July 2022

Boxscore

Portugal	51–49	Hungary

Bucov

29 July 2022

Boxscore

Romania	64–68	Slovakia

Olimpia Hall, Ploiești

30 July 2022

Boxscore

Slovakia	65–51	Switzerland

Bucov

30 July 2022

Boxscore

Hungary	60–64	Romania

Olimpia Hall, Ploiești

30 July 2022

Boxscore

Latvia	63–81	Portugal

Olimpia Hall, Ploiești

31 July 2022

Boxscore

Romania	77–62	Latvia

Olimpia Hall, Ploiești

31 July 2022

Boxscore

Hungary	68–64	Slovakia

Sala Polivalenta Blejoi, Blejoi

31 July 2022

Boxscore

Portugal	73–37	Switzerland

Bucov

2 August 2022

Boxscore

Latvia	64–58	Hungary

Bucov

2 August 2022

Boxscore

Switzerland	52–93	Romania

Olimpia Hall, Ploiești

2 August 2022

Boxscore

Slovakia	48–76	Portugal

Sala Polivalenta Blejoi, Blejoi

3 August 2022

Boxscore

Hungary	67–46	Switzerland

Bucov

3 August 2022

Boxscore

Romania	53–49	Portugal

Olimpia Hall, Ploiești

3 August 2022

Boxscore

Latvia	74–58	Slovakia

Sala Polivalenta Blejoi, Blejoi

=== Group D ===
Pos	Team	Pld	W	L	PF	PA	PD	Pts	Qualification
1	Finland	4	3	1	348	226	+122	7	Quarterfinals
2	Sweden	4	3	1	319	260	+59	7	Quarterfinals
3	Belgium	4	3	1	264	209	+55	7	9th–16th place playoffs
4	Austria	4	1	3	256	356	−100	5	9th–16th place playoffs
5	Cyprus	4	0	4	194	330	−136	4	17th–22nd place classification

Source: FIBA

29 July 2022

Boxscore

Belgium	67–23	Cyprus

Bucov

29 July 2022

Boxscore

Austria	65–90	Sweden

Bucov

30 July 2022

Boxscore

Finland	110–64	Austria

Sala Polivalenta Blejoi, Blejoi

30 July 2022

Boxscore

Sweden	58–68	Belgium

Sala Polivalenta Blejoi, Blejoi

31 July 2022

Boxscore

Cyprus	60–93	Sweden

Olimpia Hall, Ploiești

31 July 2022

Boxscore

Belgium	47–79	Finland

Olimpia Hall, Ploiești

2 August 2022

Boxscore

Finland	92–37	Cyprus

Bucov

2 August 2022

Boxscore

Austria	49–82	Belgium

Bucov

3 August 2022

Boxscore

Cyprus	74–78	Austria

Sala Polivalenta Blejoi, Blejoi

3 August 2022

Boxscore

Sweden	78–67	Finland

Sala Polivalenta Blejoi, Blejoi

== 17th–22nd place classification ==
=== Group E ===
Pos	Team	Pld	W	L	PF	PA	PD	Pts	Qualification
1	Norway	2	2	0	139	96	+43	4	17th place match
2	Ireland	2	1	1	119	152	−33	3	19th place match
3	Kosovo	2	0	2	122	132	−10	2	21st place match

Source: FIBA

5 August 2022

Boxscore

Kosovo	72–73	Ireland

Bucov

6 August 2022

Boxscore

Ireland	46–80	Norway

Bucov

=== Group F ===
Pos	Team	Pld	W	L	PF	PA	PD	Pts	Qualification
1	Slovakia	2	2	0	142	104	+38	4	17th place match
2	Switzerland	2	1	1	108	116	−8	3	19th place match
3	Cyprus	2	0	2	104	134	−30	2	21st place match

Source: FIBA

5 August 2022

Boxscore

Switzerland	57–51	Cyprus

Bucov

6 August 2022

Boxscore

Cyprus	53–77	Slovakia

Bucov

=== 21st place match ===
7 August 2022

Boxscore

Kosovo	90–74	Cyprus

Olimpia Hall, Ploiești

=== 19th place match ===
7 August 2022

Boxscore

Ireland	73–88	Switzerland

Bucov

=== 17th place match ===
7 August 2022

Boxscore

Norway	49–78	Slovakia

Bucov

== 9th–16th place playoffs ==
13th place match
C4	Hungary	69
C3	Latvia	89
15th place match
B4	Georgia	64
B3	Bulgaria	41

13th–16th place semifinals
B4	Georgia	60
C4	Hungary	67
B3	Bulgaria	48
C3	Latvia	83

9th–16th place quarterfinals
A3	Ukraine	61
B4	Georgia	60
D3	Belgium	73
C4	Hungary	60
B3	Bulgaria	85
A4	Estonia	87
C3	Latvia	75
D4	Austria	77

9th–12th place semifinals
A3	Ukraine	51
D3	Belgium	60
A4	Estonia	82
D4	Austria	75

9th place match
D3	Belgium	53
A4	Estonia	71
11th place match
A3	Ukraine	82
D4	Austria	75

=== 9th–16th place quarterfinals ===
5 August 2022

Boxscore

Ukraine	61–60	Georgia

Sala Polivalenta Blejoi, Blejoi

5 August 2022

Boxscore

Belgium	73–60	Hungary

Sala Polivalenta Blejoi, Blejoi

5 August 2022

Boxscore

Bulgaria	85–87	Estonia

Sala Polivalenta Blejoi, Blejoi

5 August 2022

Boxscore

Latvia	75–77	Austria

Sala Polivalenta Blejoi, Blejoi

=== 13th–16th place semifinals ===
6 August 2022

Boxscore

Georgia	60–67	Hungary

Sala Polivalenta Blejoi, Blejoi

6 August 2022

Boxscore

Bulgaria	48–83	Latvia

Sala Polivalenta Blejoi, Blejoi

=== 9th–12th place semifinals ===
6 August 2022

Boxscore

Ukraine	51–60	Belgium

Sala Polivalenta Blejoi, Blejoi

6 August 2022

Boxscore

Estonia	82–75	Austria

Sala Polivalenta Blejoi, Blejoi

=== 15th place match ===
7 August 2022

Boxscore

Georgia	64–41	Bulgaria

Bucov

=== 13th place match ===
7 August 2022

Boxscore

Hungary	69–89	Latvia

Sala Polivalenta Blejoi, Blejoi

=== 11th place match ===
7 August 2022

Boxscore

Ukraine	82–75	Austria

Sala Polivalenta Blejoi, Blejoi

=== 9th place match ===
7 August 2022

Boxscore

Belgium	53–71	Estonia

Sala Polivalenta Blejoi, Blejoi

== Championship playoffs ==
5th place match
C2	Portugal	81
B1	Bosnia and Herzegovina	80
7th place match
B2	Netherlands	62
C1	Romania	68

5th–8th place semifinals
B2	Netherlands	65
C2	Portugal	77
B1	Bosnia and Herzegovina	87
C1	Romania	69

Quarterfinals
A1	Denmark	85
B2	Netherlands	59
D1	Finland	73
C2	Portugal	69
B1	Bosnia and Herzegovina	89
A2	Iceland	95
C1	Romania	56
D2	Sweden	77

Semifinals
A1	Denmark	77
D1	Finland	75
A2	Iceland	71
D2	Sweden	94

Final
A1	Denmark	66
D2	Sweden	79
3rd place match
D1	Finland	72
A2	Iceland	66

=== Quarterfinals ===
5 August 2022

Boxscore

Denmark	85–59	Netherlands

Olimpia Hall, Ploiești

5 August 2022

Boxscore

Finland	73–69	Portugal

Olimpia Hall, Ploiești

5 August 2022

Boxscore

Romania	56–77	Sweden

Olimpia Hall, Ploiești

5 August 2022

Boxscore

Bosnia and Herzegovina	89–95	Iceland

Olimpia Hall, Ploiești

=== 5th–8th place semifinals ===
6 August 2022

Boxscore

Netherlands	65–77	Portugal

Olimpia Hall, Ploiești

6 August 2022

Boxscore

Bosnia and Herzegovina	87–69	Romania

Olimpia Hall, Ploiești

=== Semifinals ===
6 August 2022

Boxscore

Iceland	71–94	Sweden

Olimpia Hall, Ploiești

6 August 2022

Boxscore

Denmark	77–75	Finland

Olimpia Hall, Ploiești

=== 7th place match ===
7 August 2022

Boxscore

Netherlands	62–68	Romania

Sala Polivalenta Blejoi, Blejoi

=== 5th place match ===
7 August 2022

Boxscore

Portugal	81–80	Bosnia and Herzegovina

Olimpia Hall, Ploiești

=== 3rd place match ===
7 August 2022

Boxscore

Finland	72–66	Iceland

Olimpia Hall, Ploiești

=== Final ===
7 August 2022

Boxscore

Denmark	66–79	Sweden

Olimpia Hall, Ploiești

== Final standings ==
Rank	Team	Record
1st place, gold medalist(s)	Sweden	6–1
2nd place, silver medalist(s)	Denmark	6–1
3rd place, bronze medalist(s)	Finland	5–2
4	Iceland	4–3
5	Portugal	6–2
6	Bosnia and Herzegovina	5–3
7	Romania	5–3
8	Netherlands	3–5
9	Estonia	4–3
10	Belgium	5–2
11	Ukraine	4–3
12	Austria	2–5
13	Latvia	4–4
14	Hungary	3–5
15	Georgia	4–4
16	Bulgaria	3–5
17	Slovakia	4–3
18	Norway	4–3
19	Switzerland	2–5
20	Ireland	1–5
21	Kosovo	1–6
22	Cyprus	0–7

Promoted to the 2023 FIBA U18 European Championship Division A
Signed up for the 2023 FIBA U18 European Championship Division C

== Awards ==
2022 FIBA Europe
Under-18 Championship Division B winner

Sweden
Third title

Most Valuable Player
(Sweden) Elliot Cadeau

All-Tournament Team

- SG – (Denmark) Tobias Jensen
