= Macedonian Basketball Federation =

Governing body of basketball in North Macedonia

- Sport: Basketball
- Jurisdiction: North Macedonia
- Abbreviation: MKF
- Founded: 1948
- Affiliation: FIBA
- Regional affiliation: FIBA Europe
- Headquarters: Skopje
- President: Tomica Glavcev
- Replaced: Basketball Federation of Yugoslavia (1948–1992)

Official website
- mkd.basketball
- (North Macedonia)

The Macedonian Basketball Federation (Macedonian: Македонска Кошаркарска Федерација), also known as Basketball Federation of North Macedonia (Macedonian: Кошаркарска федерација на Северна Македонија), is the governing body of basketball in North Macedonia. It was founded in 1948. The federation joined FIBA in 1993. It organizes the Macedonian premier league and runs the North Macedonia national basketball team.

== Domestic competitions ==
=== Men ===
- Macedonian First League
- Macedonian Second League
- Macedonian Third League

=== Women ===
- Macedonian Women's First League

== International competitions ==
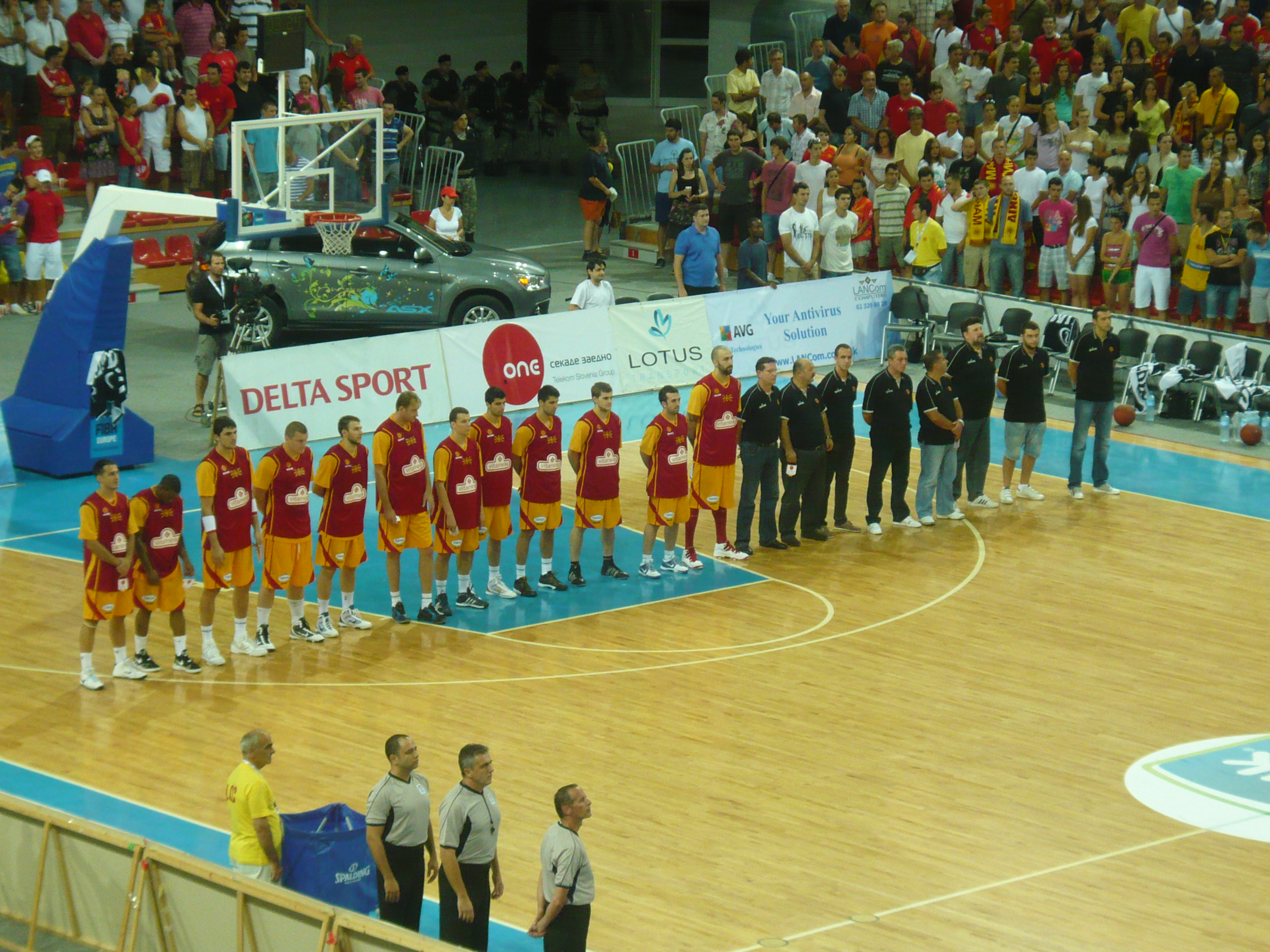
Macedonia basketball team prior to a match at Boris Trajkovski Sports Center in Skopje

=== Senior teams ===
- Men's national team
- Women's national team

=== Youth teams ===
==== U 20 ====
- North Macedonia national under-20 basketball team
- North Macedonia women's national under-20 basketball team

==== U 18 ====
- North Macedonia national under-18 basketball team
- North Macedonia women's national under-18 basketball team

==== U 16 ====
- North Macedonia national under-16 basketball team
- North Macedonia women's national under-16 basketball team

==== U 14 ====
- North Macedonia national under-14 basketball team
- North Macedonia women's national under-14 basketball team

== See also ==
- North Macedonia national basketball team
