= 2024 FIBA U18 EuroBasket Division B =

International basketball competition

Tournament details
- Host country: North Macedonia
- City: Skopje
- Dates: 26 July – 4 August 2024
- Teams: 22 (from 1 confederation)
- Venue(s): 2 (in 1 host city)

Final positions
- Champions: North Macedonia (1st title)
- Runners-up: Austria
- Third place: Bulgaria
- Fourth place: Poland

Tournament statistics
- Games played: 81
- Attendance: 14,530 (179 per game)
- MVP: (North Macedonia) Nikola Janichikj
- Top scorer: (North Macedonia) Nikola Janichikj (22.6 points per game)

Official website
- www.fiba.basketball

The 2024 FIBA U18 EuroBasket Division B was the 18th edition of the Division B of the European basketball championship for men's national under-18 teams. The tournament was played in Skopje, North Macedonia, from 26 July to 4 August 2024.

== Participating teams ==
- Austria
- Bosnia and Herzegovina
- Bulgaria
- Cyprus ▲ (Winners, 2023 FIBA U18 European Championship Division C)
- Czech Republic ▼ (16th place, 2023 FIBA U18 European Championship Division A)
- Estonia
- Georgia
- Great Britain
- Hungary
- Iceland
- Ireland
- Kosovo
- Montenegro
- Netherlands
- North Macedonia
- Norway
- Poland ▼ (14th place, 2023 FIBA U18 European Championship Division A)
- Portugal
- Romania
- Slovakia
- Switzerland
- Ukraine

== First round ==
The draw of the first round was held on 6 February 2024 in Freising, Germany.

In the first round, the teams were drawn into four groups. The first two teams from each group advance to the quarterfinals; the third and fourth teams advance to the 9th–16th place playoffs; the other teams will play in the 17th–22nd place classification groups.

All times are local (Central European Summer Time – UTC+2).

=== Group A ===
Pos	Team	Pld	W	L	PF	PA	PD	Pts	Qualification
1	Montenegro	4	3	1	324	312	+12	7	Quarterfinals
2	Bulgaria	4	3	1	352	291	+61	7	Quarterfinals
3	Slovakia	4	2	2	258	300	−42	6	9th–16th place playoffs
4	Romania	4	1	3	260	279	−19	5	9th–16th place playoffs
5	Netherlands	4	1	3	267	279	−12	5	17th–22nd place classification

Source: FIBA

26 July 2024
13:30

Boxscore

Slovakia	69–64	Netherlands
Scoring by quarter: 16–25, 23–14, 21–14, 9–11
Pts: Minarovjech 17; Rebs: Golian 18; Asts: Jendrichovsky, Pospisil 5		Pts: Beens 11; Rebs: Ngouateu 8 Asts: Ngouateu 3

Sports Centre Boris Trajkovski
Attendance: 150
Referees: Megaklis - Konstantinos Marinakis (GRE), Mikheil Vartanov (GEO), Elldin Uglari (KOS)

26 July 2024
16:00

Boxscore

Bulgaria	77–79	Montenegro
Scoring by quarter: 27–26, 14–16, 22–19, 14–18
Pts: Gavalyugov 26; Rebs: Gavalyugov 8 Asts: Gavalyugov 11		Pts: Durovic 19; Rebs: Durovic 14; Asts: Three players 3

Sports Centre Boris Trajkovski
Attendance: 100
Referees: Sergiy Chaykovskyy (UKR), Vicente Martinez Silla (ESP), Ivan Mijalkovski (MKD)

27 July 2024
11:00

Boxscore

Romania	70–90	Bulgaria
Scoring by quarter: 21–24, 22–26, 14–21, 13–19
Pts: Angelian 13; Rebs: Angelian 11; Asts: Szentkuti 6		Pts: Gavalyugov 23; Rebs: Kolev 9 Asts: Gavalyugov 6

SRC Kale
Attendance: 100
Referees: Martin Kucirek (CZE), Kyriacos Christou (CYP), Kenny Jeanmonod (SUI)

27 July 2024
13:30

Boxscore

Montenegro	83–70	Slovakia
Scoring by quarter: 15–15, 29–20, 24–17, 15–18
Pts: Radunovic 26; Rebs: Radunovic 12; Asts: Radunovic, Carapic 3		Pts: Stanko 17; Rebs: Golian 7 Asts: Minarovjech 8

SRC Kale
Attendance: 100
Referees: Polat Parlak (TUR), Marton Makrai (HUN), Vojkan Zivkovic (SRB)

28 July 2024
11:00

Boxscore

Netherlands	82–71	Montenegro
Scoring by quarter: 22–21, 12–17, 24–19, 24–14
Pts: Zwijnenburg 14; Rebs: Pinas 8 Asts: van la Parra 6		Pts: Cicic 16; Rebs: Pavlovic, Cicic 7 Asts: Komnenovic, Carapic 3

SRC Kale
Attendance: 100
Referees: Nikola Bejat (NOR), Kyriacos Christou (CYP), Kenny Jeanmonod (SUI)

28 July 2024
16:00

Boxscore

Slovakia	49–47	Romania
Scoring by quarter: 16–11, 12–14, 6–8, 15–14
Pts: Simonides 12; Rebs: Simonides 12; Asts: Jendrichovsky 3		Pts: Dinu 16; Rebs: Angelian, Rantz 7 Asts: Szentkuti 3

SRC Kale
Attendance: 100
Referees: Iain Macdonald (GBR), Vicente Martinez Silla (ESP), Alija Ferevski (MKD)

30 July 2024
16:00

Boxscore

Bulgaria	106–70	Slovakia
Scoring by quarter: 28–13, 24–18, 27–19, 27–20
Pts: Gavalyugov 16; Rebs: Vasilev 7 Asts: Dimitrov, Gavalyugov 4		Pts: Pospisil 12; Rebs: Golian 9 Asts: Jendrichovsky 5

SRC Kale
Attendance: 100
Referees: Iain Macdonald (GBR), Primož Pipan (SLO), Vicente Martinez Silla (ESP)

30 July 2024
18:30

Boxscore

Romania	60–49	Netherlands
Scoring by quarter: 11–13, 15–13, 18–13, 16–10
Pts: Dinu 15; Rebs: Dinu 9 Asts: Dinu 4		Pts: Three players 9 Rebs: Deijkers 6 Asts: Coenradie 8

Sports Centre Boris Trajkovski
Attendance: 100
Referees: Martin Kucirek (CZE), Oleksandr Oparin (UKR), Elldin Uglari (KOS)

31 July 2024
13:30

Boxscore

Netherlands	72–79	Bulgaria
Scoring by quarter: 16–23, 21–18, 12–21, 23–17
Pts: Aiyamenkhue 16; Rebs: Ngouateu 9 Asts: Coenradie 6		Pts: Gavalyugov 18; Rebs: Vasilev 8 Asts: Gavalyugov 7

SRC Kale
Attendance: 40
Referees: Martin Kucirek (CZE), Nikola Bejat (NOR), Vojkan Zivkovic (SRB)

31 July 2024
21:00

Boxscore

Montenegro	91–83	Romania
Scoring by quarter: 18–27, 19–31, 22–11, 32–14
Pts: Radunovic, Draskovic 17; Rebs: Beciragic 8 Asts: Radunovic 6		Pts: Rantz 15; Rebs: Blidaru, Angelian 5 Asts: Vlaicu 6

SRC Kale
Attendance: 100
Referees: Polat Parlak (TUR), Alija Ferevski (MKD), Ivan Mijalkovski (MKD)

=== Group B ===
Pos	Team	Pld	W	L	PF	PA	PD	Pts	Qualification
1	Switzerland	5	4	1	387	313	+74	9	Quarterfinals
2	Poland	5	3	2	356	316	+40	8	Quarterfinals
3	Hungary	5	3	2	376	309	+67	8	9th–16th place playoffs
4	Iceland	5	3	2	362	354	+8	8	9th–16th place playoffs
5	Estonia	5	2	3	330	343	−13	7	17th–22nd place classification
6	Kosovo	5	0	5	235	411	−176	5	17th–22nd place classification

Source: FIBA

26 July 2024
13:30

Boxscore

Kosovo	47–73	Estonia
Scoring by quarter: 10–19, 11–18, 10–19, 16–17
Pts: Bytyqi 9 Rebs: Rrahmani 7 Asts: Kastrati 2		Pts: Kivimägi 17; Rebs: Vändra 7 Asts: Kullamäe 7

SRC Kale
Attendance: 100
Referees: Alin Faur (ROU), Martin Kucirek (CZE), Alija Ferevski (MKD)

26 July 2024
16:00

Boxscore

Iceland	63–87	Switzerland
Scoring by quarter: 17–24, 16–22, 19–17, 11–24
Pts: Grissom 16; Rebs: Eythorsson, Svansson 5 Asts: Eythorsson 5		Pts: Nessah 19; Rebs: Njock 11; Asts: Three players 3

SRC Kale
Attendance: 50
Referees: Nikola Bejat (NOR), Kyriacos Christou (CYP), Artjoms Ribakovs (SVK)

26 July 2024
21:00

Boxscore

Poland	55–57	Hungary
Scoring by quarter: 18–15, 7–17, 15–12, 15–13
Pts: Sternicki 15; Rebs: Sternicki 11; Asts: Poradzki 3		Pts: Three players 10; Rebs: Flasar 10; Asts: Lukacsi 3

Sports Centre Boris Trajkovski
Attendance: 150
Referees: Primož Pipan (SLO), Roko Hordov (CRO), Lauri Jäämaa (FIN)

27 July 2024
11:00

Boxscore

Estonia	55–74	Iceland
Scoring by quarter: 8–21, 11–18, 24–19, 12–16
Pts: Tomann 19; Rebs: Kullamäe 7 Asts: Kullamäe 10		Pts: Stefansson, Bjorgvinsson 13; Rebs: Svansson 10; Asts: Valgardsson 4

Sports Centre Boris Trajkovski
Attendance: 20
Referees: Megaklis - Konstantinos Marinakis (GRE), Diogo Martins (POR), Mikheil Vartanov (GEO)

27 July 2024
16:00

Boxscore

Hungary	99–41	Kosovo
Scoring by quarter: 28–8, 25–16, 18–5, 28–12
Pts: Palotai 18; Rebs: Flasar 6 Asts: Lukacsi 7		Pts: Ahmeti 17; Rebs: Three players 5 Asts: Five players 1

Sports Centre Boris Trajkovski
Attendance: 70
Referees: Nikola Bejat (NOR), Angel Ivanov (BUL), Vlad-Theodor Cotrobas-Dascalu (ROU)

27 July 2024
21:00

Boxscore

Switzerland	75–61	Poland
Scoring by quarter: 16–14, 24–22, 16–17, 19–8
Pts: Nessah 28; Rebs: Nessah 11; Asts: Nessah, Ouko 5		Pts: Sternicki, Baganc 17; Rebs: Baganc 11; Asts: Sternicki 7

SRC Kale
Attendance: 100
Referees: Vladimir Zanev (BUL), Aleksandar Radonjic (AUT), Oleksandr Oparin (UKR)

28 July 2024
11:00

Boxscore

Hungary	72–73 (OT)	Estonia
Scoring by quarter: 13–20, 13–12, 16–11, 18–17, Overtime: 12–13
Pts: Rosta 14; Rebs: Buglyo 8 Asts: Lukacsi 7		Pts: Kullamäe 21; Rebs: Suvi 10; Asts: Kullamäe 7

Sports Centre Boris Trajkovski
Attendance: 10
Referees: Vladimir Zanev (BUL), Aleksandar Radonjic (AUT), Oleksandr Oparin (UKR)

28 July 2024
16:00

Boxscore

Poland	90–71	Iceland
Scoring by quarter: 26–14, 31–18, 18–17, 15–22
Pts: Baganc 22; Rebs: Sternicki, Misztal 6 Asts: Poradzki, Sternicki 6		Pts: Eythorsson 15; Rebs: Luthviksson 13; Asts: Bragason, Valgardsson 3

Sports Centre Boris Trajkovski
Attendance: 50
Referees: Sergiy Chaykovskyy (UKR), Ilias Karpanos (GRE), Vlad-Theodor Cotrobas-Dascalu (ROU)

28 July 2024
18:30

Boxscore

Kosovo	52–87	Switzerland
Scoring by quarter: 9–26, 19–15, 11–29, 13–17
Pts: Kastrati, Ahmeti 16; Rebs: Nuradini 8 Asts: Ahmeti 3		Pts: Njock 18; Rebs: Leuthardt 10; Asts: Bernegger 7

Sports Centre Boris Trajkovski
Attendance: 50
Referees: Ivan Mijalkovski (MKD), Diogo Martins (POR), Primož Pipan (SLO)

30 July 2024
13:30

Boxscore

Iceland	77–52	Kosovo
Scoring by quarter: 25–8, 14–19, 17–10, 21–15
Pts: Ludviksson 20; Rebs: Ludviksson 9 Asts: Eythorsson 4		Pts: Rrahmani 21; Rebs: Rrahmani 13; Asts: Syla 3

Sports Centre Boris Trajkovski
Attendance: 100
Referees: Mladen Lucic (MNE), Aleksandar Radonjic (AUT), Nikola Bejat (NOR)

30 July 2024
13:30

Boxscore

Switzerland	63–78	Hungary
Scoring by quarter: 15–19, 18–25, 16–17, 14–17
Pts: Nessah 22; Rebs: Nessah 6 Asts: Maniema 4		Pts: Rosta, Buglyo 13; Rebs: Flasar, Buglyo 7 Asts: Lukacsi 8

SRC Kale
Attendance: 50
Referees: Tijmen Last (NED), Ilias Karpanos (GRE), Kyriacos Christou (CYP)

30 July 2024
21:00

Boxscore

Estonia	70–75	Poland
Scoring by quarter: 12–15, 11–19, 23–25, 24–16
Pts: Olop 21; Rebs: Tomann, Binis 8 Asts: Kullamäe 11		Pts: Sternicki 23; Rebs: Baganc 8 Asts: Poradzki, Sternicki 4

Sports Centre Boris Trajkovski
Attendance: 100
Referees: Polat Parlak (TUR), Sergiy Chaykovskyy (UKR), Megaklis - Konstantinos Marinakis (GRE)

31 July 2024
11:00

Boxscore

Hungary	70–77 (OT)	Iceland
Scoring by quarter: 20–18, 15–18, 21–19, 10–11, Overtime: 4–11
Pts: Lukacsi 14; Rebs: Angyal 10; Asts: Lukacsi 5		Pts: Bjorgvinsson 21; Rebs: Ludviksson 12; Asts: Four players 2

Sports Centre Boris Trajkovski
Attendance: 100
Referees: Angel Ivanov (BUL), Sergiy Chaykovskyy (UKR), Primož Pipan (SLO)

31 July 2024
16:00

Boxscore

Kosovo	43–75	Poland
Scoring by quarter: 8–29, 17–11, 11–12, 7–23
Pts: Rrahmani 13; Rebs: Rrahmani 7 Asts: Syla 3		Pts: Cwik 13; Rebs: Sternicki, Dabrowski 5 Asts: Milicic 6

SRC Kale
Attendance: 50
Referees: Roko Hordov (CRO), Aleksandar Radonjic (AUT), Oleksandr Oparin (UKR)

31 July 2024
18:30

Boxscore

Switzerland	75–59	Estonia
Scoring by quarter: 15–8, 27–13, 15–19, 18–19
Pts: Maniema 16; Rebs: Diakite 9 Asts: Maniema 6		Pts: Tomann 18; Rebs: Tomann 8 Asts: Kullamäe 7

Sports Centre Boris Trajkovski
Attendance: 100
Referees: Iain Macdonald (GBR), Vladimir Zanev (BUL), Lauri Jäämaa (FIN)

=== Group C ===
Pos	Team	Pld	W	L	PF	PA	PD	Pts	Qualification
1	North Macedonia	5	5	0	451	369	+82	10	Quarterfinals
2	Czech Republic	5	4	1	406	308	+98	9	Quarterfinals
3	Ireland	5	3	2	341	330	+11	8	9th–16th place playoffs
4	Ukraine	5	2	3	385	375	+10	7	9th–16th place playoffs
5	Bosnia and Herzegovina	5	1	4	352	355	−3	6	17th–22nd place classification
6	Cyprus	5	0	5	232	430	−198	5	17th–22nd place classification

Source: FIBA

26 July 2024
11:00

Boxscore

Czech Republic	93–71	Ukraine
Scoring by quarter: 26–20, 16–22, 26–17, 25–12
Pts: Cank 25; Rebs: Macht 8 Asts: Three Players 3		Pts: Yiamu 17; Rebs: Sytar 10; Asts: Sushkin 7

Sports Centre Boris Trajkovski
Attendance: 150
Referees: Iain Macdonald (GBR), Diogo Martins (POR), Ngadhnjim Shabani (KOS)

26 July 2024
11:00

Boxscore

Cyprus	44–97	Bosnia and Herzegovina
Scoring by quarter: 10–29, 11–21, 15–22, 8–25
Pts: Kouzapas 10; Rebs: Koutouris 6 Asts: Georgiou 3		Pts: Acimovic 16; Rebs: Acimovic 11; Asts: Suput, Durović 5

SRC Kale
Attendance: 100
Referees: Tijmen Last (NED), Ivo Kitsing (EST), Marton Makrai (HUN)

26 July 2024
18:30

Boxscore

North Macedonia	73–63 (OT)	Ireland
Scoring by quarter: 17–20, 20–12, 15–17, 10–13, Overtime: 11–1
Pts: Janichikj 27; Rebs: Trajanov, Lukanoski 9 Asts: Petrovikj 4		Pts: Njekwe 15; Rebs: Okojie 11; Asts: Malecki, Horkan 3

SRC Kale
Attendance: 500
Referees: Polat Parlak (TUR), Kenny Jeanmonod (SUI), Vojkan Zivkovic (SRB)

27 July 2024
13:30

Boxscore

Ukraine	93–42	Cyprus
Scoring by quarter: 22–16, 21–8, 29–16, 21–2
Pts: Lokhmanchuk 17; Rebs: Yiamu 9 Asts: Romanytsia 5		Pts: Karagiannis 12; Rebs: Koutouris 6 Asts: Constantinou 3

Sports Centre Boris Trajkovski
Attendance: 20
Referees: Vicente Martinez Silla (ESP), Lauri Jäämaa (FIN), Artjoms Ribakovs (SVK)

27 July 2024
18:30

Boxscore

Bosnia and Herzegovina	87–99	North Macedonia
Scoring by quarter: 25–24, 22–25, 25–25, 15–25
Pts: Durović 18; Rebs: Acimovic 7 Asts: Duvnjak 7		Pts: Janichikj 31; Rebs: Kjirilovski 8 Asts: Kjirilovski 5

SRC Kale
Attendance: 1,000
Referees: Mladen Lucic (MNE), Iain Macdonald (GBR), Ilias Karpanos (GRE)

27 July 2024
21:00

Boxscore

Ireland	56–71	Czech Republic
Scoring by quarter: 15–13, 11–18, 14–16, 16–24
Pts: Scully 16; Rebs: Njekwe 8 Asts: Okojie 3		Pts: Ivanek 17; Rebs: Soldan 10; Asts: Kremen 4

Sports Centre Boris Trajkovski
Attendance: 40
Referees: Primož Pipan (SLO), Roko Hordov (CRO), Michal Kuzia (POL)

28 July 2024
13:30

Boxscore

Ukraine	70–59	Bosnia and Herzegovina
Scoring by quarter: 20–17, 24–13, 15–12, 11–17
Pts: Sushkin 17; Rebs: Lokhmanchuk 12; Asts: Upyr 6		Pts: Duvnjak 14; Rebs: Baberovic 10; Asts: Delic, Duvnjak 3

Sports Centre Boris Trajkovski
Attendance: 10
Referees: Roko Hordov (CRO), Mikheil Vartanov (GEO), Michal Kuzia (POL)

28 July 2024
18:30

Boxscore

Czech Republic	86–94	North Macedonia
Scoring by quarter: 27–27, 22–32, 19–13, 18–22
Pts: Cank 25; Rebs: Macht, Kristan 6 Asts: Smazak, Cank 4		Pts: Janichikj 25; Rebs: Kjirilovski 10; Asts: Marjanovikj 6

SRC Kale
Attendance: 1,000
Referees: Tijmen Last (NED), Alin Faur (ROU), Artjoms Ribakovs (SVK)

28 July 2024
21:00

Boxscore

Cyprus	53–67	Ireland
Scoring by quarter: 16–12, 9–18, 10–25, 18–12
Pts: Mannaris 23; Rebs: Mannaris, Kouzapas 8 Asts: Koutouris 5		Pts: Njekwe 14; Rebs: Gbinigie 9 Asts: Malecki, Scully 3

SRC Kale
Attendance: 100
Referees: Mladen Lucic (MNE), Eduard Uhrin (SVK), Ngadhnjim Shabani (KOS)

30 July 2024
11:00

Boxscore

Ireland	98–79	Ukraine
Scoring by quarter: 22–21, 25–19, 20–17, 31–22
Pts: Scully 16; Rebs: Osayanrhion 8 Asts: Scully 5		Pts: Lokhmanchuk 22; Rebs: Yiamu 7 Asts: Sushkin 7

SRC Kale
Attendance: 50
Referees: Roko Hordov (CRO), Diogo Martins (POR), Eduard Uhrin (SVK)

30 July 2024
11:00

Boxscore

Bosnia and Herzegovina	55–85	Czech Republic
Scoring by quarter: 18–21, 4–16, 17–28, 16–20
Pts: Baberovic 14; Rebs: Jankovic 10; Asts: Bulajic 3		Pts: Ivanek 21; Rebs: Cank, Gevorkyan 9 Asts: Cank 6

Sports Centre Boris Trajkovski
Attendance: 100
Referees: Alin Faur (ROU), Vlad-Theodor Cotrobas-Dascalu (ROU), Artjoms Ribakovs (SVK)

30 July 2024
18:30

Boxscore

North Macedonia	102–61	Cyprus
Scoring by quarter: 24–13, 17–16, 33–14, 28–18
Pts: Stojkovikj 20; Rebs: Kjirilovski, Lukanoski 9 Asts: Janichikj 7		Pts: Karagiannis 14; Rebs: Koutouris 8 Asts: Koutouris 7

SRC Kale
Attendance: 500
Referees: Mikheil Vartanov (GEO), Kenny Jeanmonod (SUI), Vojkan Zivkovic (SRB)

31 July 2024
13:30

Boxscore

Ireland	57–54	Bosnia and Herzegovina
Scoring by quarter: 15–15, 25–3, 11–16, 6–20
Pts: Seltzer, Gbinigie 11; Rebs: Malecki, Okojie 8 Asts: Three players 2		Pts: Delic 11; Rebs: Hrelja 15; Asts: Hrelja 4

Sports Centre Boris Trajkovski
Attendance: 100
Referees: Mikheil Vartanov (GEO), Vicente Martinez Silla (ESP), Kenny Jeanmonod (SUI)

31 July 2024
18:30

Boxscore

Ukraine	72–83	North Macedonia
Scoring by quarter: 16–23, 11–26, 24–10, 21–24
Pts: Sushkin 20; Rebs: Yiamu 15; Asts: Three players 4		Pts: Janichikj 21; Rebs: Lukanoski 12; Asts: Janichikj, Marjanovikj 5

SRC Kale
Attendance: 50
Referees: Alin Faur (ROU), Vlad-Theodor Cotrobas-Dascalu (ROU), Artjoms Ribakovs (SVK)

31 July 2024
21:00

Boxscore

Cyprus	32–71	Czech Republic
Scoring by quarter: 10–18, 9–15, 8–16, 5–22
Pts: Aslanidis 12; Rebs: Kouzapas 5 Asts: Aslanidis 3		Pts: Soldan 15; Rebs: Gevorkyan 12; Asts: Smazak, Paidar 5

Sports Centre Boris Trajkovski
Attendance: 100
Referees: Marton Makrai (HUN), Ivo Kitsing (EST), Michal Kuzia (POL)

=== Group D ===
Pos	Team	Pld	W	L	PF	PA	PD	Pts	Qualification
1	Austria	4	4	0	307	248	+59	8	Quarterfinals
2	Portugal	4	2	2	271	237	+34	6	Quarterfinals
3	Norway	4	2	2	254	259	−5	6	9th–16th place playoffs
4	Georgia	4	2	2	264	281	−17	6	9th–16th place playoffs
5	Great Britain	4	0	4	233	304	−71	4	17th–22nd place classification

Source: FIBA

26 July 2024
18:30

Boxscore

Georgia	80–67	Great Britain
Scoring by quarter: 18–16, 16–19, 22–16, 24–16
Pts: Bakhtadze 20; Rebs: Three players 11; Asts: Mujirishvili 7		Pts: King-Danchie 16; Rebs: Emenalo, Kraria 8 Asts: Robinson 6

Sports Centre Boris Trajkovski
Attendance: 100
Referees: Vladimir Zanev (BUL), Vlad-Theodor Cotrobas-Dascalu (ROU), Angel Ivanov (BUL)

26 July 2024
21:00

Boxscore

Norway	75–71	Portugal
Scoring by quarter: 27–18, 13–20, 18–14, 17–19
Pts: Nordheim 20; Rebs: Bergseng 11; Asts: Demoniere 6		Pts: Andrade 19; Rebs: Cherepenko 8 Asts: Andrade 4

SRC Kale
Attendance: 100
Referees: Mladen Lucic (MNE), Michal Kuzia (POL), Oleksandr Oparin (UKR)

27 July 2024
16:00

Boxscore

Austria	88–71	Georgia
Scoring by quarter: 21–13, 19–14, 20–19, 28–25
Pts: Suljanovic 34; Rebs: Schott 9 Asts: Schuch 6		Pts: Bakhtadze 21; Rebs: Aroshidze 12; Asts: Mujirishvili 7

SRC Kale
Attendance: 100
Referees: Alija Ferevski (MKD), Tijmen Last (NED), Eduard Uhrin (SVK)

27 July 2024
18:30

Boxscore

Great Britain	51–58	Norway
Scoring by quarter: 13–19, 8–13, 13–14, 17–12
Pts: Kraria 9 Rebs: Kraria 8 Asts: Four players 2		Pts: Demoniere 16; Rebs: Bergseng 14; Asts: Hellebust 3

Sports Centre Boris Trajkovski
Attendance: 50
Referees: Sergiy Chaykovskyy (UKR), Ivan Mijalkovski (MKD), Elldin Uglari (KOS)

28 July 2024
13:30

Boxscore

Norway	62–74	Austria
Scoring by quarter: 16–21, 12–17, 13–18, 21–18
Pts: Hellebust 21; Rebs: Nordheim, Kruse 6 Asts: Demoniere 4		Pts: Suljanovic 22; Rebs: Schott, Schuch 11; Asts: Kress 4

SRC Kale
Attendance: 100
Referees: Ivo Kitsing (EST), Marton Makrai (HUN), Megaklis - Konstantinos Marinakis (GRE)

28 July 2024
21:00

Boxscore

Portugal	81–52	Great Britain
Scoring by quarter: 16–16, 16–10, 24–11, 25–15
Pts: Noronha 25; Rebs: Panzo 8 Asts: Andrade, Silva 4		Pts: Kraria 14; Rebs: Emenalo, Kraria 8 Asts: Basquine 4

Sports Centre Boris Trajkovski
Attendance: 50
Referees: Polat Parlak (TUR), Martin Kucirek (CZE), Lauri Jäämaa (FIN)

30 July 2024
16:00

Boxscore

Austria	60–52	Portugal
Scoring by quarter: 14–21, 12–9, 20–8, 14–14
Pts: Suljanovic 19; Rebs: Schott 14; Asts: Michel, Schott 3		Pts: Noronha 17; Rebs: Panzo 8 Asts: Andrade, Coelho 2

Sports Centre Boris Trajkovski
Attendance: 100
Referees: Vladimir Zanev (BUL), Ivan Mijalkovski (MKD), Michal Kuzia (POL)

30 July 2024
21:00

Boxscore

Georgia	63–59	Norway
Scoring by quarter: 18–22, 17–15, 10–16, 18–6
Pts: Bakhtadze 18; Rebs: Daushvili 10; Asts: Abuladze 7		Pts: Nordheim 17; Rebs: Bergseng 10; Asts: Hellebust 4

SRC Kale
Attendance: 40
Referees: Angel Ivanov (BUL), Ivo Kitsing (EST), Ngadhnjim Shabani (KOS)

31 July 2024
11:00

Boxscore

Great Britain	63–85	Austria
Scoring by quarter: 16–26, 14–17, 12–22, 21–20
Pts: King-Danchie 17; Rebs: Kraria 12; Asts: Eweka, Kraria 3		Pts: Suljanovic 20; Rebs: Dietz, Kircher 7 Asts: Three players 3

SRC Kale
Attendance: 20
Referees: Ilias Karpanos (GRE), Eduard Uhrin (SVK), Elldin Uglari (KOS)

31 July 2024
16:00

Boxscore

Portugal	67–50	Georgia
Scoring by quarter: 21–8, 19–19, 13–9, 14–14
Pts: Noronha 17; Rebs: Panzo 7 Asts: Caetano 6		Pts: Daushvili 15; Rebs: Daushvili 16; Asts: Tabaghua 4

Sports Centre Boris Trajkovski
Attendance: 100
Referees: Tijmen Last (NED), Kyriacos Christou (CYP), Ngadhnjim Shabani (KOS)

== 17th–22nd place classification ==
=== Group E ===
Pos	Team	Pld	W	L	PF	PA	PD	Pts	Qualification
1	Estonia	2	2	0	146	109	+37	4	17th place match
2	Netherlands	2	1	1	164	128	+36	3	19th place match
3	Kosovo	2	0	2	102	175	−73	2	21st place match

Source: FIBA

2 August 2024
11:00

Boxscore

Kosovo	55–102	Netherlands
Scoring by quarter: 10–30, 29–28, 12–16, 4–28
Pts: Ahmeti 17; Rebs: Tafilaj 6 Asts: Three players 3		Pts: van den Berg 18; Rebs: Pinas 17; Asts: Ngouateu 8

SRC Kale
Attendance: 10
Referees: Kenny Jeanmonod (SUI), Megaklis - Konstantinos Marinakis (GRE), Marton Makrai (HUN)

3 August 2024
11:00

Boxscore

Netherlands	62–73	Estonia
Scoring by quarter: 22–15, 15–9, 12–34, 13–15
Pts: Aiyamenkhue, Ngouateu 11; Rebs: Ngouateu 9 Asts: van den Berg 4		Pts: Tomann 19; Rebs: Binis 9 Asts: Kullamäe 11

Sports Centre Boris Trajkovski
Attendance: 50
Referees: Diogo Martins (POR), Vojkan Zivkovic (SRB), Eduard Uhrin (SVK)

=== Group F ===
Pos	Team	Pld	W	L	PF	PA	PD	Pts	Qualification
1	Bosnia and Herzegovina	2	2	0	153	97	+56	4	17th place match
2	Great Britain	2	1	1	116	113	+3	3	19th place match
3	Cyprus	2	0	2	101	160	−59	2	21st place match

Source: FIBA

2 August 2024
11:00

Boxscore

Cyprus	57–63	Great Britain
Scoring by quarter: 19–22, 16–19, 15–4, 7–18
Pts: Koutouris 14; Rebs: Koutouris 10; Asts: Constantinou 3		Pts: Basquine 20; Rebs: Kraria 15; Asts: Wilkinson 5

Sports Centre Boris Trajkovski
Attendance: 50
Referees: Angel Ivanov (BUL), Sergiy Chaykovskyy (UKR), Vlad-Theodor Cotrobas-Dascalu (ROU)

3 August 2024
11:00

Boxscore

Great Britain	53–56	Bosnia and Herzegovina
Scoring by quarter: 19–10, 16–14, 6–24, 12–8
Pts: Kraria 11; Rebs: Kraria 12; Asts: Three players 2		Pts: Hrelja 12; Rebs: Hrelja 10; Asts: Durović, Duvnjak 4

SRC Kale
Attendance: 10
Referees: Vladimir Zanev (BUL), Angel Ivanov (BUL), Marton Makrai (HUN)

=== 21st place match ===
4 August 2024
16:30

Boxscore

Kosovo	65–51	Cyprus
Scoring by quarter: 11–14, 22–11, 18–12, 14–14
Pts: Rrahmani 14; Rebs: Rrahmani, Tusuni 8 Asts: Kastrati 4		Pts: Mannaris 11; Rebs: Koutouris 7 Asts: Aslanidis 3

Sports Centre Boris Trajkovski
Attendance: 100
Referees: Kenny Jeanmonod (SUI), Alija Ferevski (MKD), Vlad-Theodor Cotrobas-Dascalu (ROU)

=== 19th place match ===
4 August 2024
9:00

Boxscore

Netherlands	72–78	Great Britain
Scoring by quarter: 23–14, 14–22, 14–32, 21–10
Pts: Ngouateu, Beens 12; Rebs: Zwijnenburg 6 Asts: Bernardina 6		Pts: Basquine 27; Rebs: Basquine 12; Asts: Kraria 7

SRC Kale
Attendance: 10
Referees: Alin Faur (ROU), Roko Hordov (CRO), Elldin Uglari (KOS)

=== 17th place match ===
4 August 2024
9:00

Boxscore

Estonia	88–74	Bosnia and Herzegovina
Scoring by quarter: 24–17, 21–13, 20–25, 23–19
Pts: Kivimägi 23; Rebs: Tomann 10; Asts: Kullamäe 14		Pts: Jankovic, Hrelja 15; Rebs: Hrelja 5 Asts: Delic, Duvnjak 3

Sports Centre Boris Trajkovski
Attendance: 50
Referees: Ivan Mijalkovski (MKD), Ngadhnjim Shabani (KOS), Sergiy Chaykovskyy (UKR)

== 9th–16th place playoffs ==
13th place match
Ukraine	90
Romania	80
15th place match
Slovakia	70
Georgia	66

13th–16th place semifinals
Slovakia	67
Ukraine	77
Romania	87
Georgia	71

9th–16th place quarterfinals
A3	Slovakia	57
B4	Iceland	75
D3	Norway	76
C4	Ukraine	71
B3	Hungary	80
A4	Romania	62
C3	Ireland	74
D4	Georgia	69

9th–12th place semifinals
Iceland	73
Norway (OT)	77
Hungary	48
Ireland	32

9th place match
Norway	56
Hungary	76
11th place match
Iceland	62
Ireland	83

=== 9th–16th place quarterfinals ===
2 August 2024
13:30

Boxscore

Slovakia	57–75	Iceland
Scoring by quarter: 12–23, 16–18, 15–18, 14–16
Pts: Stanko 19; Rebs: Stanko 7 Asts: Nahlik 6		Pts: Eythorsson 20; Rebs: Eythorsson 9 Asts: Bragason 5

SRC Kale
Attendance: 20
Referees: Kyriacos Christou (CYP), Alin Faur (ROU), Alija Ferevski (MKD)

2 August 2024
13:30

Boxscore

Hungary	80–62	Romania
Scoring by quarter: 20–5, 19–27, 23–11, 18–19
Pts: Buglyo 13; Rebs: Rosta 7 Asts: Tallos 6		Pts: Dubuc 14; Rebs: Dubuc 6 Asts: Blidaru 4

Sports Centre Boris Trajkovski
Attendance: 50
Referees: Mladen Lucic (MNE), Diogo Martins (POR), Artjoms Ribakovs (SVK)

2 August 2024
16:00

Boxscore

Norway	76–71	Ukraine
Scoring by quarter: 15–12, 12–21, 26–19, 23–19
Pts: Nordheim 21; Rebs: Bergseng 6 Asts: Hellebust 5		Pts: Upyr 18; Rebs: Korol 7 Asts: Sushkin 4

SRC Kale
Attendance: 50
Referees: Vladimir Zanev (BUL), Ngadhnjim Shabani (KOS), Aleksandar Radonjic (AUT)

2 August 2024
16:00

Boxscore

Ireland	74–69	Georgia
Scoring by quarter: 15–19, 25–21, 15–15, 19–14
Pts: Osayanrhion 21; Rebs: Okojie 8 Asts: Okojie 3		Pts: Three players 15; Rebs: Aroshidze 9 Asts: Tabaghua 5

Sports Centre Boris Trajkovski
Attendance: 100
Referees: Lauri Jaamaa (FIN), Vojkan Zivkovic (SRB), Elldin Uglari (KOS)

=== 13th–16th place semifinals ===
3 August 2024
13:30

Boxscore

Slovakia	67–77	Ukraine
Scoring by quarter: 13–21, 19–18, 21–20, 14–18
Pts: Golian 14; Rebs: Golian 11; Asts: Minarovjech 7		Pts: Yiamu 24; Rebs: Yiamu 13; Asts: Sushkin 6

SRC Kale
Attendance: 20
Referees: Iain Macdonald (GBR), Primož Pipan (SLO), Alija Ferevski (MKD)

3 August 2024
16:00

Boxscore

Romania	87–71	Georgia
Scoring by quarter: 30–15, 21–13, 17–25, 19–18
Pts: Vlaicu 24; Rebs: Voiculescu 12; Asts: Dubuc 3		Pts: Daushvili 25; Rebs: Daushvili, Bakhtadze 8 Asts: Tabaghua 9

SRC Kale
Attendance: 30
Referees: Ilias Karpanos (GRE), Aleksandar Radonjic (AUT), Megaklis - Konstantinos Marinakis (GRE)

=== 9th–12th place semifinals ===
3 August 2024
13:30

Boxscore

Iceland	73–77 (OT)	Norway
Scoring by quarter: 15–17, 20–21, 16–8, 17–22, Overtime: 5–9
Pts: Eythorsson 22; Rebs: Ludviksson 14; Asts: Bjorgvinsson 8		Pts: Bergseng 23; Rebs: Bergseng 12; Asts: Nordheim 3

Sports Centre Boris Trajkovski
Attendance: 50
Referees: Polat Parlak (TUR), Ivan Mijalkovski (MKD), Oleksandr Oparin (UKR)

3 August 2024
21:00

Boxscore

Hungary	48–32	Ireland
Scoring by quarter: 17–2, 12–10, 7–9, 12–11
Pts: Mezofi 10; Rebs: Angyal 11; Asts: Lukacsi, Szita 3		Pts: Igbokwe 8 Rebs: Igbokwe 8 Asts: Four players 1

SRC Kale
Attendance: 50
Referees: Ivo Kitsing (EST), Martin Kucirek (CZE), Elldin Uglari (KOS)

=== 15th place match ===
4 August 2024
11:30

Boxscore

Slovakia	70–66	Georgia
Scoring by quarter: 31–14, 15–18, 9–23, 15–11
Pts: Golian 20; Rebs: Golian 10; Asts: Minarovjech 13		Pts: Abuladze 22; Rebs: Kapanadze 13; Asts: Tabaghua 5

SRC Kale
Attendance: 10
Referees: Vojkan Zivkovic (SRB), Nikola Bejat (NOR), Marton Makrai (HUN)

=== 13th place match ===
4 August 2024
11:30

Boxscore

Ukraine	90–80	Romania
Scoring by quarter: 19–16, 30–16, 16–23, 25–25
Pts: Upyr, Sinnik 17; Rebs: Hohulenko, Sinnik 8 Asts: Upyr 5		Pts: Blidaru 21; Rebs: Dubuc 9 Asts: Blidaru 6

Sports Centre Boris Trajkovski
Attendance: 50
Referees: Kyriacos Christou (CYP), Artjoms Ribakovs (SVK), Megaklis - Konstantinos Marinakis (GRE)

=== 11th place match ===
4 August 2024
16:30

Boxscore

Iceland	62–83	Ireland
Scoring by quarter: 14–19, 16–24, 16–16, 16–24
Pts: Grissom 16; Rebs: Bragason 7 Asts: Bjorgvinsson 6		Pts: Scully, Seltzer 15; Rebs: Osayanrhion, Gbinigie 10; Asts: Scully 5

SRC Kale
Attendance: 70
Referees: Lauri Jäämaa (FIN), Angel Ivanov (BUL), Aleksandar Radonjic (AUT)

=== 9th place match ===
4 August 2024
19:00

Boxscore

Norway	56–76	Hungary
Scoring by quarter: 7–19, 12–22, 17–11, 20–24
Pts: Bergseng 16; Rebs: Bergseng 13; Asts: Demoniere 5		Pts: Lukacsi 17; Rebs: Tallos, Buglyo 5 Asts: Kekesi, Angyal 5

SRC Kale
Attendance: 30
Referees: Mladen Lucic (MNE), Tijmen Last (NED), Michal Kuzia (POL)

== Championship playoffs ==
5th place match
Montenegro	77
Switzerland	57
7th place match
Czech Republic	54
Portugal	88

5th–8th place semifinals
Montenegro	95
Czech Republic	62
Switzerland	68
Portugal	67

Quarterfinals
A1	Montenegro	74
B2	Poland	82
D1	Austria	85
C2	Czech Republic	58
B1	Switzerland	78
A2	Bulgaria	84
C1	North Macedonia	71
D2	Portugal	42

Semifinals
Poland	75
Austria	88
Bulgaria	68
North Macedonia	92

Final
Austria	88
North Macedonia	98
3rd place match
Poland	64
Bulgaria	85

=== Quarterfinals ===
2 August 2024
18:30

Boxscore

Montenegro	74–82	Poland
Scoring by quarter: 23–20, 17–26, 16–17, 18–19
Pts: Krnic 19; Rebs: Radunovic, Krnic 6 Asts: Carapic 4		Pts: Sternicki 26; Rebs: Baganc 10; Asts: Zoran Milicic, Baganc 4

Sports Centre Boris Trajkovski
Attendance: 100
Referees: Iain Macdonald (GBR), Ivo Kitsing (EST), Nikola Bejat (NOR)

2 August 2024
18:30

Boxsocre

North Macedonia	71–42	Portugal
Scoring by quarter: 17–8, 13–14, 21–9, 20–11
Pts: Lukanoski 17; Rebs: Lukanoski 14; Asts: Janichikj, Marjanovikj 4		Pts: Noronha 12; Rebs: Panzo 6 Asts: Coelho, Panzo 3

SRC Kale
Attendance: 600
Referees: Vicente Martinez Silla (ESP), Mikheil Vartanov (GEO), Martin Kucirek (CZE)

2 August 2024
21:00

Boxscore

Austria	85–58	Czech Republic
Scoring by quarter: 25–15, 20–10, 31–15, 9–18
Pts: Zeleznik 19; Rebs: Suljanovic 10; Asts: Schott 4		Pts: Macht 11; Rebs: Macht 7 Asts: Paidar 4

Sports Centre Boris Trajkovski
Attendance: 100
Referees: Polat Parlak (TUR), Ivan Mijalkovski (MKD), Oleksandr Oparin (UKR)

2 August 2024
21:00

Boxscore

Switzerland	78–84	Bulgaria
Scoring by quarter: 15–27, 15–23, 22–18, 26–16
Pts: Nessah 26; Rebs: Nessah, Maniema 6 Asts: Bernegger 7		Pts: Gavalyugov 20; Rebs: Kolev 11; Asts: Gavalyugov 11

SRC Kale
Attendance: 100
Referees: Tijmen Last (NED), Ilias Karpanos (GRE), Michal Kuzia (POL)

=== 5th–8th place semifinals ===
3 August 2024
16:00

Boxscore

Montenegro	95–62	Czech Republic
Scoring by quarter: 27–10, 31–15, 19–18, 18–19
Pts: Radunovic 24; Rebs: Radunovic 10; Asts: Durovic 6		Pts: Ivanek 13; Rebs: Cank, Macht 6 Asts: Kremen 2

Sports Centre Boris Trajkovski
Attendance: 100
Referees: Vicente Martinez Silla (ESP), Nikola Bejat (NOR), Roko Hordov (CRO)

3 August 2024
18:30

Boxscore

Switzerland	68–67	Portugal
Scoring by quarter: 20–17, 15–14, 16–24, 17–12
Pts: Njock 13; Rebs: Njock 8 Asts: Sassella 4		Pts: Caetano, Panzo 13; Rebs: Carrera 9 Asts: Panzo 5

SRC Kale
Referees: Alin Faur (ROU), Ngadhnjim Shabani (KOS), Michal Kuzia (POL)

=== Semifinals ===
3 August 2024
18:30

Boxscore

Bulgaria	68–92	North Macedonia
Scoring by quarter: 20–26, 18–27, 24–16, 6–23
Pts: Trifonov 20; Rebs: Kolev 12; Asts: Gavalyugov 9		Pts: Lukanoski 20; Rebs: Lukanoski 16; Asts: Mladenovski 8

Centre Boris Trajkovski
Referees: Kyriacos Christou (CYP), Lauri Jäämaa (FIN), Mikheil Vartanov (GEO)

3 August 2024
21:00

Boxscore

Poland	75–88	Austria
Scoring by quarter: 26–22, 18–23, 15–20, 16–23
Pts: Baganc 13; Rebs: Three players 4 Asts: Poradzki 5		Pts: Suljanovic 28; Rebs: Schott 16; Asts: Schuch 6

Centre Boris Trajkovski
Attendance: 100
Referees: Tijmen Last (NED), Mladen Lucic (MNE), Kenny Jeanmonod (SUI)

=== 7th place match ===
4 August 2024
14:00

Boxscore

Czech Republic	54–88	Portugal
Scoring by quarter: 12–20, 18–25, 18–19, 6–24
Pts: Cank 9 Rebs: Gevorkyan 6 Asts: Kremen 3		Pts: Noronha 21; Rebs: Panzo 8 Asts: Caetano, Coelho 5

SRC Kale
Attendance: 50
Referees: Mikheil Vartanov (GEO), Primož Pipan (SLO), Eduard Uhrin (SVK)

=== 5th place match ===
4 August 2024
14:00

Boxscore

Montenegro	77–57	Switzerland
Scoring by quarter: 21–17, 24–8, 21–11, 11–21
Pts: Radunovic 16; Rebs: Radunovic 13; Asts: Carapic 6		Pts: Njock 11; Rebs: Ouko 9 Asts: Maniema 4

Sports Centre Boris Trajkovski
Attendance: 100
Referees: Ivo Kitsing (EST), Diogo Martins (POR), Oleksandr Oparin (UKR)

=== 3rd place match ===
4 August 2024
19:00

Boxscore

Poland	64–85	Bulgaria
Scoring by quarter: 23–26, 15–29, 16–14, 10–16
Pts: Sternicki 23; Rebs: Milicic, Sternicki 8 Asts: Sternicki 6		Pts: Gavalyugov 20; Rebs: Vasilev 10; Asts: Gavalyugov 11

Sports Centre Boris Trajkovski
Attendance: 250
Referees: Iain Macdonald (GBR), Vicente Martinez Silla (ESP), Martin Kucirek (CZE)

=== Final ===
4 August 2024
21:30

Boxscore

Austria	88–98	North Macedonia
Scoring by quarter: 29–32, 15–25, 20–21, 24–20
Pts: Zeleznik 21; Rebs: Schott 9 Asts: Suljanovic 5		Pts: Janichikj 30; Rebs: Trajanov 8 Asts: Janichikj, Marjanovikj 4

Sports Centre Boris Trajkovski
Attendance: 3,500
Referees: Polat Parlak (TUR), Ilias Karpanos (GRE), Vladimir Zanev (BUL)

== Final standings ==
Rank	Team	Record
1st place, gold medalist(s)	North Macedonia	8–0
2nd place, silver medalist(s)	Austria	6–1
3rd place, bronze medalist(s)	Bulgaria	5–2
4	Poland	4–4
5	Montenegro	5–2
6	Switzerland	5–3
7	Portugal	3–4
8	Czech Republic	4–4
9	Hungary	6–2
10	Norway	4–3
11	Ireland	5–3
12	Iceland	4–4
13	Ukraine	3–4
14	Romania	2–5
15	Slovakia	3–4
16	Georgia	2–5
17	Estonia	3–4
18	Bosnia and Herzegovina	2–5
19	Great Britain	2–5
20	Netherlands	2–4
21	Kosovo	1–6
22	Cyprus	0–7

Promoted to the 2025 FIBA U18 EuroBasket Division A
Relegated to the 2025 FIBA U18 EuroBasket Division C

== Statistics and awards ==
=== Statistical leaders ===
==== Players ====
Points

Name	PPG
(North Macedonia) Nikola Janichikj	22.6
(Austria) Imran Suljanovic	22.4
(Switzerland) Dayan Nessah	21.4
(Bulgaria) Aleksandar Gavalyugov	19.4
(Poland) Tymoteusz Sternicki	17.6

Rebounds

Name	RPG
(Austria) Fynn Schott	10.3
(United Kingdom) Aymen Kraria	10.0
(Georgia (country)) Alexandre Daushvili	10.0
(North Macedonia) Marko Lukanoski	9.9
(Norway) Ludvik Bergseng	9.9

Assists

Name	APG
(Estonia) Oliver Kullamäe	9.6
(Bulgaria) Aleksandar Gavalyugov	8.4
(Slovakia) Martin Minarovjech	5.4
(Hungary) Gabor Lukacsi	5.0
(North Macedonia) Luka Marjanovikj	4.6

Blocks

Name	BPG
(Austria) Fynn Schott	2.4
(Netherlands) Yannick Pinas	2.1
(Norway) Ludvik Bergseng	2.1
(Slovakia) Maros Golian	2.0
(Hungary) Zalan Flasar	2.0

Steals

Name	SPG
(Ukraine) Yehor Sushkin	3.5
(United Kingdom) Aymen Kraria	3.1
(North Macedonia) Stefan Stojkovikj	2.9
(Slovakia) Martin Pospisil	2.8
(Cyprus) Dimitris Mannaris	2.7
(Portugal) Jhonathan Andrade	2.7
(Austria) Fynn Schott	2.7

Efficiency

Name	EFFPG
(Austria) Fynn Schott	24.1
(Bulgaria) Aleksandar Gavalyugov	21.9
(Austria) Imran Suljanovic	20.4
(Switzerland) Dayan Nessah	20.0
(Ukraine) Desmond Yiamu	19.3

==== Teams ====
Points

Team	PPG
North Macedonia	89.0
Bulgaria	84.1
Montenegro	81.4
Austria	81.1
Ukraine	77.9

Rebounds

Team	RPG
North Macedonia	48.9
Ireland	48.0
Great Britain	47.0
Georgia	47.0
Austria	46.6

Assists

Team	APG
North Macedonia	21.4
Bulgaria	19.6
Hungary	18.6
Austria	17.9
Switzerland	17.5

Blocks

Team	BPG
Netherlands	6.4
Austria	5.0
Hungary	5.0
Ireland	4.9
Poland	4.8

Steals

Team	SPG
North Macedonia	13.9
Ukraine	13.9
Portugal	12.9
Ireland	12.1
Bulgaria	11.9

Efficiency

Team	EFFPG
North Macedonia	100.9
Bulgaria	96.9
Austria	95.0
Montenegro	89.7
Hungary	87.9

=== Awards ===
The awards were announced on 4 August 2024.

Award	Player
All-Tournament Team	(North Macedonia) Nikola Janichikj
All-Tournament Team	(North Macedonia) Marko Lukanoski
All-Tournament Team	(Austria) Imran Suljanovic
All-Tournament Team	(Austria) Fynn Schott
All-Tournament Team	(Bulgaria) Aleksandar Gavalyugov
Most Valuable Player	(North Macedonia) Nikola Janichikj
