= 2004 FIBA Europe Under-18 Championship =

International basketball competition

2004 EuroBasket Under-18
21st FIBA Europe Under-18 Championship

Tournament details
- Host country: Spain
- Teams: 12

Final positions
- Champions: Spain (2nd title)

The 2004 FIBA Europe Under-18 Championship was an international basketball competition held in Spain in 2004.

== Final ranking ==
1. Spain

2. Turkey

3. France

4. Italy

5. Serbia and Montenegro

6. Russia

7. Greece

8. Israel

9. Lithuania

10. Bulgaria

11. (Georgia (country)) Georgia

12. Latvia

== Awards ==
Winners
Spain
