= Denmark men's national under-18 basketball team =

National basketball team of Denmark

Denmark
- FIBA zone: FIBA Europe
- National federation: Danmarks Basketball Forbund

U19 World Cup
- Appearances: None

U18 EuroBasket
- Appearances: 4
- Medals: None

U18 EuroBasket Division B
- Appearances: 14
- Medals: Gold: 1 (2025); Silver: 2 (2011, 2022)
Home	Away

The Denmark men's national under-18 basketball team is a national basketball team of Denmark, administered by the Danish Basketball Association. It represents the country in international under-18 men's basketball competitions.

== FIBA U18 EuroBasket participations ==
Year	Division A	Division B
2007		17th
2008		8th
2009		14th
2010		15th
2011		2nd place, silver medalist(s)
2012	15th	
2013		17th
2014		12th
2015		10th

Year	Division A	Division B
2016		15th
2017		8th
2018		22nd
2019		18th
2022		2nd place, silver medalist(s)
2023	13th	
2024	16th	
2025		1st place, gold medalist(s)
2026	12th	

== See also ==
- Denmark men's national basketball team
- Denmark men's national under-16 basketball team
- Denmark women's national under-18 basketball team
