= 2018 FIBA U18 European Championship Division B =

Tournament details
- Host country: Macedonia
- City: Skopje
- Dates: 27 July – 5 August
- Teams: 24
- Venues: 3 (in 1 host city)

Final positions
- Champions: Netherlands (1st title)
- Runners-up: Slovenia
- Third place: Belgium
- Fourth place: Estonia

Tournament statistics
- MVP: (Netherlands) Nathan Kuta
- Top scorer: (Bulgaria) Tsvetomir Chernokojev (21.0 ppg)

Official website
- www.fiba.basketball

The 2018 FIBA U18 European Championship Division B was the 14th edition of the Division B of FIBA U18 European Championship. The competition took place in Skopje, Republic of Macedonia, from 27 July to 5 August 2018.

== Participating teams ==
- Albania
- Austria
- Azerbaijan
- Belarus
- Belgium
- Bulgaria
- Czech Republic
- Denmark
- Estonia
- Georgia
- Hungary
- Iceland
- Israel
- Luxembourg
- Macedonia
- Netherlands
- Norway ▲ (Winners, 2017 FIBA U18 European Championship Division C)
- Poland
- Portugal
- Romania
- Slovakia ▼ (15th place, 2017 FIBA U18 European Championship Division A)
- Slovenia ▼ (14th place, 2017 FIBA U18 European Championship Division A)
- Sweden
- Switzerland

== Group phase ==
In this round, the 24 teams are allocated in four groups of six teams each.

=== Group A ===
Pos	Team	Pld	W	L	PF	PA	PD	Pts	Qualification	(Portugal)	(Belarus)	(Norway)	(Poland)	(Romania)	(Switzerland)
1	Portugal	5	4	1	346	307	+39	9	Quarterfinals	—	70–64	79–80	76–62	66–59	55–42
2	Belarus	5	4	1	417	355	+62	9	Quarterfinals	64–70	—	85–79	82–74	97–69	89–63
3	Norway	5	3	2	404	391	+13	8	9th−16th place playoffs	80–79	79–85	—	92–87	71–76	82–46
4	Poland	5	2	3	411	389	+22	7	9th−16th place playoffs	62–76	74–82	87–92	—	84–71	104–68
5	Romania	5	2	3	357	394	−37	7	17th−24th place playoffs	59–66	69–97	76–71	71–84	—	82–76
6	Switzerland	5	0	5	313	412	−99	5	17th−24th place playoffs	42–55	63–89	64–82	68–104	76–82	—

Source: FIBA
Rules for classification: 1) Points; 2) Head-to-head results; 3) Points difference; 4) Points scored.

=== Group B ===
Pos	Team	Pld	W	L	PF	PA	PD	Pts	Qualification	(Estonia)	(Belgium)	(Austria)	(Hungary)	(Georgia (country))	(Azerbaijan)
1	Estonia	5	5	0	416	335	+81	10	Quarterfinals	—	71–70	85–64	88–69	87–72	85–60
2	Belgium	5	4	1	450	301	+149	9	Quarterfinals	70–71	—	108–61	81–58	83–65	108–46
3	Austria	5	3	2	338	390	−52	8	9th−16th place playoffs	64–85	61–108	—	63–61	88–76	62–60
4	Hungary	5	2	3	339	361	−22	7	9th−16th place playoffs	69–88	58–81	61–63	—	87–74	64–55
5	Georgia	5	1	4	362	395	−33	6	17th−24th place playoffs	72–87	65–83	76–88	74–87	—	75–50
6	Azerbaijan	5	0	5	271	394	−123	5	17th−24th place playoffs	60–85	46–108	60–62	55–64	50–75	—

Source: FIBA
Rules for classification: 1) Points; 2) Head-to-head results; 3) Points difference; 4) Points scored.

=== Group C ===
Pos	Team	Pld	W	L	PF	PA	PD	Pts	Qualification	(Netherlands)	(Czech Republic)	(Israel)	(Iceland)	(Luxembourg)	(North Macedonia)
1	Netherlands	5	4	1	427	326	+101	9	Quarterfinals	—	74–58	75–80	90–68	104–58	84–62
2	Czech Republic	5	4	1	393	333	+60	9	Quarterfinals	58–74	—	85–74	95–73	85–49	70–63
3	Israel	5	4	1	431	347	+84	9	9th−16th place playoffs	80–75	74–85	—	92–60	104–70	81–57
4	Iceland	5	1	4	343	404	−61	6	9th−16th place playoffs	68–90	73–95	60–92	—	82–65	60–62
5	Luxembourg	5	1	4	315	438	−123	6	17th−24th place playoffs	58–104	49–85	70–104	65–82	—	73–63
6	Macedonia	5	1	4	307	368	−61	6	17th−24th place playoffs	62–84	63–70	57–81	62–60	63–73	—

Source: FIBA
Rules for classification: 1) Points; 2) Head-to-head results; 3) Points difference; 4) Points scored.

=== Group D ===
Pos	Team	Pld	W	L	PF	PA	PD	Pts	Qualification	(Slovenia)	(Sweden)	(Bulgaria)	(Slovakia)	(Denmark)	(Albania)
1	Slovenia	5	4	1	381	290	+91	9	Quarterfinals	—	70–67	66–69	73–66	93–53	79–35
2	Sweden	5	4	1	416	313	+103	9	Quarterfinals	67–70	—	62–58	81–73	84–70	122–42
3	Bulgaria	5	3	2	364	314	+50	8	9th−16th place playoffs	69–66	58–62	—	75–60	69–77	93–49
4	Slovakia	5	2	3	368	326	+42	7	9th−16th place playoffs	66–73	73–81	60–75	—	88–50	81–47
5	Denmark	5	2	3	337	374	−37	7	17th−24th place playoffs	53–93	70–84	77–69	50–88	—	87–40
6	Albania	5	0	5	213	462	−249	5	17th−24th place playoffs	35–79	42–122	49–93	47–81	40–87	—

Source: FIBA
Rules for classification: 1) Points; 2) Head-to-head results; 3) Points difference; 4) Points scored.

== Final round ==
=== 17th−24th place playoffs ===
21st place match
D5	Denmark	64
B5	Georgia	80
23rd place match
A5	Romania	102
D6	Albania	55

21st–24th place semifinals
A5	Romania	64
D5	Denmark	76
B5	Georgia	93
D6	Albania	47

17th−24th place quarterfinals
A5	Romania	61
B6	Azerbaijan	62
D5	Denmark	54
C6	Macedonia	85
B5	Georgia	61
A6	Switzerland	63
C5	Luxembourg	84
D6	Albania	61

17th−20th place semifinals
B6	Azerbaijan	50
C6	Macedonia	65
A6	Switzerland	90
C5	Luxembourg	47

17th place match
C6	Macedonia	64
A6	Switzerland	65
19th place match
B6	Azerbaijan	53
C5	Luxembourg	57

=== 9th−16th place playoffs ===
13th place match
A3	Norway	79
D4	Slovakia	71
15th place match
C4	Iceland	86
B3	Austria	55

13st–16th place semifinals
A3	Norway	88
C4	Iceland	80
B3	Austria	65
D4	Slovakia	80

9th−16th place quarterfinals
A3	Norway	67
B4	Hungary	99
D3	Bulgaria	81
C4	Iceland	61
B3	Austria	71
A4	Poland	80
C3	Israel	93
D4	Slovakia	81

9th−12th place semifinals
B4	Hungary	78
D3	Bulgaria	72
A4	Poland	87
C3	Israel	95

9th place match
B4	Hungary	63
C3	Israel	81
11th place match
D3	Bulgaria	85
A4	Poland	83

=== Championship playoffs ===
5th place match
C2	Czech Republic	80
A2	Belarus	78
7th place match
A1	Portugal	66
D2	Sweden	69

5th–8th place semifinals
A1	Portugal	66
C2	Czech Republic	82
A2	Belarus	79
D2	Sweden	66

Quarterfinals
A1	Portugal	54
B2	Belgium	67
D1	Slovenia	68
C2	Czech Republic	65
B1	Estonia	78
A2	Belarus	60
C1	Netherlands	93
D2	Sweden	71

Semifinals
B2	Belgium	70
D1	Slovenia	73
B1	Estonia	68
C1	Netherlands	79

Final
D1	Slovenia	57
C1	Netherlands	86
3rd place match
B2	Belgium	73
B1	Estonia	67

=== Final ===
August 5, 2018
21:00

Boxscore

Slovenia	57–86	Netherlands
Scoring by quarter: 15–23, 11–19, 12–25, 19–19
Pts: Vujačić 20; Rebs: Vujačić 5 Asts: Samar 5		Pts: Van der Vuurst de Vries 35; Rebs: Mast 11; Asts: Van der Vuurst de Vries 8

SRC Kale, Skopje
Attendance: 1,000
Referees: Ademir Zurapovic (BIH), Alessandro Martolini (ITA), Mihkel Männiste (EST)

== Final standings ==
Rank	Team	Record
Gold medal	Netherlands	7–1
Silver medal	Slovenia	6–2
Bronze medal	Belgium	6–2
4th	Estonia	6–2
5th	Czech Republic	6–2
6th	Belarus	5–3
7th	Sweden	5–3
8th	Portugal	4–4
9th	Israel	7–1
10th	Hungary	4–4
11th	Bulgaria	5–3
12th	Poland	3–5
13th	Norway	5–3
14th	Slovakia	3–5
15th	Iceland	2–6
16th	Austria	3–5
17th	Switzerland	3–5
18th	Macedonia	3–5
19th	Luxembourg	3–5
20th	Azerbaijan	1–7
21st	Georgia	3–5
22nd	Denmark	3–5
23rd	Romania	3–5
24th	Albania	0–8

Promoted to the 2019 FIBA U18 European Championship Division A
Relegated to the 2019 FIBA U18 European Championship Division C

== Awards ==
2018 Under-17 European Championship B winner

Netherlands
First title

Most Valuable Player
(Netherlands) Nathan Kuta

All-Tournament Team

- (Belgium) Vrenz Bleijenbergh
- (Estonia) Henri Drell
- (Slovenia) Gregor Glas
- (Netherlands) Nathan Kuta
- (Belarus) Dzmitry Ryuny
