= 2019 FIBA U18 European Championship Division B =

Tournament details
- Host country: Romania
- City: Oradea
- Dates: 26 July – 4 August 2019
- Teams: 24

Final positions
- Champions: (gold) Israel (1st title)
- Runners-up: (silver) Poland
- Third place: (bronze) Czech Republic
- Fourth place: North Macedonia

Tournament statistics
- MVP: (Israel) Noam Dovrat

Official website
- www.fiba.basketball

The 2019 FIBA U18 European Championship Division B was the 15th edition of the Division B of FIBA U18 European Championship. The competition takes place in Oradea, Romania, from 26 July to 4 August 2019.

== Participating teams ==
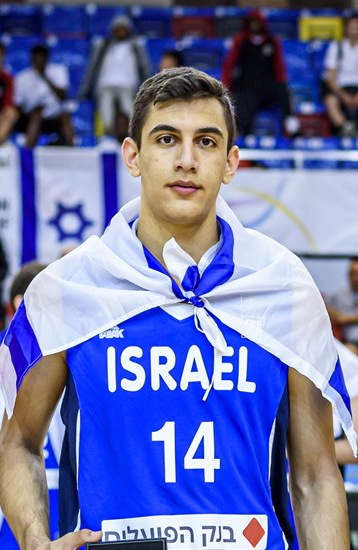
Noam Dovrat, MVP.

- Austria
- Belarus
- Belgium
- Bosnia and Herzegovina ▼ (16th place, 2018 FIBA U18 European Championship Division A)
- Bulgaria
- Czech Republic
- Denmark
- Estonia
- Georgia
- Hungary
- Iceland
- Ireland ▲ (3rd place, 2018 FIBA U18 European Championship Division C)
- Israel
- Kosovo ▲ (Winners, 2018 FIBA U18 European Championship Division C)
- Luxembourg
- North Macedonia
- Norway
- Poland
- Portugal
- Romania
- Slovakia
- Sweden
- Switzerland
- Ukraine ▼ (15th place, 2018 FIBA U18 European Championship Division A)

== Group phase ==
In this round, the 24 teams are allocated in four groups of six teams each.

=== Group A ===
Pos	Team	Pld	W	L	PF	PA	PD	Pts	Qualification	(Poland)	(Estonia)	(Belgium)	(Bulgaria)	(Switzerland)	(Romania)
1	Poland	5	4	1	355	269	+86	9	Quarterfinals	—	59–63	65–43	84–75	81–36	66–52
2	Estonia	5	4	1	357	319	+38	9	Quarterfinals	63–59	—	79–89	70–60	64–60	81–51
3	Belgium	5	4	1	373	307	+66	9	9th–16th place playoffs	43–65	89–79	—	80–68	94–40	67–55
4	Bulgaria	5	2	3	368	380	−12	7	9th–16th place playoffs	75–84	60–70	68–80	—	81–80	84–66
5	Switzerland	5	1	4	277	371	−94	6	17th–24th place playoffs	36–81	60–64	40–94	80–81	—	61–51
6	Romania	5	0	5	275	359	−84	5	17th–24th place playoffs	52–66	51–81	55–67	66–84	51–61	—

Source: FIBA
Rules for classification: 1) Points; 2) Head-to-head results; 3) Points difference; 4) Points scored.

=== Group B ===
Pos	Team	Pld	W	L	PF	PA	PD	Pts	Qualification	(North Macedonia)	(Georgia (country))	(Ukraine)	(Republic of Ireland)	(Denmark)	(Slovakia)
1	North Macedonia	5	5	0	397	341	+56	10	Quarterfinals	—	87–79	73–71	74–60	80–73	83–58
2	Georgia	5	4	1	406	308	+98	9	Quarterfinals	79–87	—	85–73	77–63	85–40	80–45
3	Ukraine	5	3	2	391	347	+44	8	9th–16th place playoffs	71–73	73–85	—	74–63	91–67	82–59
4	Ireland	5	2	3	356	342	+14	7	9th–16th place playoffs	60–74	63–77	63–74	—	81–60	89–57
5	Denmark	5	1	4	304	392	−88	6	17th–24th place playoffs	73–80	40–85	67–91	60–81	—	64–55
6	Slovakia	5	0	5	274	398	−124	5	17th–24th place playoffs	58–83	45–80	59–82	57–89	55–64	—

Source: FIBA
Rules for classification: 1) Points; 2) Head-to-head results; 3) Points difference; 4) Points scored.

=== Group C ===
Pos	Team	Pld	W	L	PF	PA	PD	Pts	Qualification	(Israel)	(Czech Republic)	(Bosnia and Herzegovina)	(Iceland)	(Norway)	(Luxembourg)
1	Israel	5	5	0	433	257	+176	10	Quarterfinals	—	61–50	82–77	97–53	93–46	100–31
2	Czech Republic	5	4	1	479	279	+200	9	Quarterfinals	50–61	—	112–68	103–65	97–52	117–33
3	Bosnia and Herzegovina	5	3	2	403	352	+51	8	9th–16th place playoffs	77–82	68–112	—	84–57	69–63	105–38
4	Iceland	5	2	3	367	391	−24	7	9th–16th place playoffs	53–97	65–103	57–84	—	96–69	96–38
5	Norway	5	1	4	297	397	−100	6	17th–24th place playoffs	46–93	52–97	63–69	69–96	—	67–42
6	Luxembourg	5	0	5	182	485	−303	5	17th–24th place playoffs	31–100	33–117	38–105	38–96	42–67	—

Source: FIBA
Rules for classification: 1) Points; 2) Head-to-head results; 3) Points difference; 4) Points scored.

=== Group D ===
Pos	Team	Pld	W	L	PF	PA	PD	Pts	Qualification	(Portugal)	(Sweden)	(Belarus)	(Hungary)	(Austria)	(Kosovo)
1	Portugal	5	4	1	385	301	+84	9	Quarterfinals	—	74–77	88–70	73–62	78–45	72–47
2	Sweden	5	4	1	418	343	+75	9	Quarterfinals	77–74	—	83–84	85–56	97–69	76–60
3	Belarus	5	4	1	416	376	+40	9	9th–16th place playoffs	70–88	84–83	—	97–72	82–59	83–74
4	Hungary	5	2	3	340	365	−25	7	9th–16th place playoffs	62–73	56–85	72–97	—	72–55	78–55
5	Austria	5	1	4	320	408	−88	6	17th–24th place playoffs	45–78	69–97	59–82	55–72	—	92–79
6	Kosovo	5	0	5	315	401	−86	5	17th–24th place playoffs	47–72	60–76	74–83	55–78	79–92	—

Source: FIBA
Rules for classification: 1) Points; 2) Head-to-head results; 3) Points difference; 4) Points scored.

== Final round ==
=== 17th–24th place playoffs ===
21st place match
B6	Slovakia	57
A6	Romania	91
23rd place match
C6	Luxembourg	49
D6	Kosovo	67

21st–24th place semifinals
B6	Slovakia	75
C6	Luxembourg	69
A6	Romania	79
D6	Kosovo	61

17th–24th place quarterfinals
A5	Switzerland	83
B6	Slovakia	61
D5	Austria	81
C6	Luxembourg	26
B5	Denmark	66
A6	Romania	62
C5	Norway	87
D6	Kosovo	72

17th–20th place semifinals
A5	Switzerland	61
D5	Austria	68
B5	Denmark	85
C5	Norway	57

17th place match
D5	Austria	67
B5	Denmark	64
19th place match
A5	Switzerland	70
C5	Norway	50

=== 9th–16th place playoffs ===
13th place match
D3	Belarus	93
A4	Bulgaria	81
15th place match
B4	Ireland	66
D4	Hungary	91

13st–16th place semifinals
B4	Ireland	86
D3	Belarus	87
A4	Bulgaria	86
D4	Hungary	79

9th–16th place quarterfinals
A3	Belgium	93
B4	Ireland	70
D3	Belarus	93
C4	Iceland	98
B3	Ukraine	97
A4	Bulgaria	74
C3	Bosnia and Herzegovina	76
D4	Hungary	60

9th–12th place semifinals
A3	Belgium	91
C4	Iceland	80
B3	Ukraine	95
C3	Bosnia and Herzegovina	74

9th place match
A3	Belgium	57
B3	Ukraine	65
11th place match
C4	Iceland	80
C3	Bosnia and Herzegovina	72

=== Championship playoffs ===
5th place match
D1	Portugal	66
A2	Estonia	76
7th place match
B2	Georgia	65
D2	Sweden	91

5th–8th place semifinals
B2	Georgia	62
D1	Portugal	73
A2	Estonia	76
D2	Sweden	68

Quarterfinals
A1	Poland	67
B2	Georgia	44
D1	Portugal	74
C2	Czech Republic	83
B1	North Macedonia	92
A2	Estonia	57
C1	Israel	95
D2	Sweden	47

Semifinals
A1	Poland	76
C2	Czech Republic	58
B1	North Macedonia	66
C1	Israel	78

Final
A1	Poland	79
C1	Israel	81
3rd place match
C2	Czech Republic	89
B1	North Macedonia	80

==== Final ====
4 August 2019
20:45

Boxscore

Poland	79–81	Israel
Scoring by quarter: 19–12, 27–19, 16–34, 17–16

Arena Antonio Alexe, Oradea
Referees:
Aleksandar Milojevic (MKD)
Valerio Grigioni (ITA)
Ali Sakaci (TUR)

== Final standings ==
Rank	Team	Record
1st place, gold medalist(s)	Israel	8–0
2nd place, silver medalist(s)	Poland	6–2
3rd place, bronze medalist(s)	Czech Republic	6–2
4th	North Macedonia	6–2
5th	Estonia	6–2
6th	Portugal	5–3
7th	Sweden	5–3
8th	Georgia	4–4
9th	Ukraine	6–2
10th	Belgium	6–2
11th	Iceland	4–4
12th	Bosnia and Herzegovina	4–4
13th	Belarus	6–2
14th	Bulgaria	3–5
15th	Hungary	3–5
16th	Ireland	2–6
17th	Austria	4–4
18th	Denmark	3–5
19th	Switzerland	3–5
20th	Norway	2–6
21st	Romania	2–6
22nd	Slovakia	1–7
23rd	Kosovo	1–7
24th	Luxembourg	0–8

Promoted to the 2022 FIBA U18 European Championship Division A
Promoted to the 2022 FIBA U18 European Championship Division A after exclusion of Russia
Relegated to the 2022 FIBA U18 European Championship Division C
