= Estonia men's national under-18 basketball team =

Estonia
- FIBA zone: FIBA Europe
- National federation: Eesti Korvpalliliit
- Coach: Martin Rausberg

U19 World Cup
- Appearances: None

U18 EuroBasket
- Appearances: 3
- Medals: None

U18 EuroBasket Division B
- Appearances: 17
- Medals: Silver: 2 (2006, 2025); Bronze: 1 (2017)
Home	Away

The Estonia men's national under-18 basketball team is a national basketball team of Estonia, administered by the Estonian Basketball Association. It represents the country in international under-18 men's basketball competitions.

== History ==
The Estonia men's national under-18 basketball team made its debut in the FIBA U18 European Championship in the early 1990s, following the country's reinstatement into FIBA in 1991 after regaining independence. The team has alternated between Division A and Division B of the continental competition, often serving as a springboard for players who later feature in the senior national team.

Estonia hosted the 2017 FIBA U18 European Championship Division B in Tallinn. The home team finished 3rd, narrowly missing out on promotion to Division A. The event was seen as an important showcase for Estonia's basketball infrastructure and rising generation of players.

Over the years, the U18 program has developed several players who later became key figures in Estonian basketball, including Maik-Kalev Kotsar, Henri Drell, and Kasper Suurorg.

== FIBA U18 EuroBasket participations ==
Year	Division A	Division B
2005		10th
2006		2nd place, silver medalist(s)
2007	12th	
2008	16th	
2009		15th
2010		5th
2011		5th
2012		6th
2013		7th
2014		17th

Year	Division A	Division B
2015		15th
2016		7th
2017		3rd place, bronze medalist(s)
2018		4th
2019		5th
2022		9th
2023		13th
2024		17th
2025		2nd place, silver medalist(s)
2026	10th	

== See also ==
- Estonia men's national basketball team
- Estonia men's national under-16 basketball team
- Estonia women's national under-18 basketball team
