= 2015 FIBA Europe Under-18 Championship Division B =

Tournament details
- Host country: Austria
- City: Oberwart, Güssing, Fürstenfeld
- Dates: 23 July – 2 August 2015
- Teams: 24 (from 1 confederation)
- Venue: 3 (in 3 host cities)

Final positions
- Champions: Sweden (2nd title)
- Runners-up: Israel
- Third place: Slovenia

Official website
- FIBA Archive

The 2015 FIBA Europe Under-18 Championship Division B was an international youth basketball competition held in Austria in 2015.

== Participating teams ==
- Albania
- Austria
- Belarus
- Belgium ▼ (15th place, 2014 FIBA Europe Under-18 Championship Division A)
- Bulgaria
- Denmark
- England ▼ (14th place, 2014 FIBA Europe Under-18 Championship Division A)
- Estonia
- Georgia
- Hungary
- Iceland
- Ireland
- Israel
- Luxembourg
- Macedonia
- Netherlands
- Poland ▼ (16th place, 2014 FIBA Europe Under-18 Championship Division A)
- Portugal
- Romania
- Scotland
- Slovakia
- Slovenia
- Sweden
- Switzerland

== First round ==
In this round, the 24 teams are allocated in four groups of six teams each. The best two teams of each group advance to the Quarterfinal groups.

=== Group A ===
Pos	Team	Pld	W	L	PF	PA	PD	Pts	Qualification
1	Poland	5	5	0	406	301	+105	10	Quarterfinal groups
2	England	5	4	1	346	274	+72	9	Quarterfinal groups
3	Switzerland	5	3	2	307	318	−11	8	9th–16th place groups
4	Estonia	5	2	3	327	307	+20	7	9th–16th place groups
5	Bulgaria	5	1	4	286	330	−44	6	17th–24th place groups
6	Albania	5	0	5	246	388	−142	5	17th–24th place groups

Source: FIBA Archive
Rules for classification: 1) Points; 2) Head-to-head results; 3) Points difference; 4) Points scored.

=== Group B ===
Pos	Team	Pld	W	L	PF	PA	PD	Pts	Qualification
1	Slovenia	5	5	0	409	289	+120	10	Quarterfinal groups
2	Hungary	5	3	2	318	335	−17	8	Quarterfinal groups
3	Belgium	5	3	2	404	319	+85	8	9th–16th place groups
4	Netherlands	5	2	3	344	307	+37	7	9th–16th place groups
5	Belarus	5	2	3	315	404	−89	7	17th–24th place groups
6	Luxembourg	5	0	5	266	402	−136	5	17th–24th place groups

Source: FIBA Archive
Rules for classification: 1) Points; 2) Head-to-head results; 3) Points difference; 4) Points scored.

=== Group C ===
Pos	Team	Pld	W	L	PF	PA	PD	Pts	Qualification
1	Sweden	5	5	0	408	254	+154	10	Quarterfinal groups
2	Georgia	5	4	1	361	327	+34	9	Quarterfinal groups
3	Portugal	5	3	2	343	329	+14	8	9th–16th place groups
4	Romania	5	2	3	333	351	−18	7	9th–16th place groups
5	Scotland	5	1	4	264	375	−111	6	17th–24th place groups
6	Slovakia	5	0	5	307	380	−73	5	17th–24th place groups

Source: FIBA Archive
Rules for classification: 1) Points; 2) Head-to-head results; 3) Points difference; 4) Points scored.

=== Group D ===
Pos	Team	Pld	W	L	PF	PA	PD	Pts	Qualification
1	Iceland	5	4	1	399	329	+70	9	Quarterfinal groups
2	Israel	5	4	1	443	331	+112	9	Quarterfinal groups
3	Denmark	5	4	1	373	341	+32	9	9th–16th place groups
4	Austria	5	2	3	352	381	−29	7	9th–16th place groups
5	Ireland	5	1	4	333	431	−98	6	17th–24th place groups
6	Macedonia	5	0	5	319	406	−87	5	17th–24th place groups

Source: FIBA Archive
Rules for classification: 1) Points; 2) Head-to-head results; 3) Points difference; 4) Points scored.

== Second round ==
=== 17th–24th place groups ===
==== Group I ====
Pos	Team	Pld	W	L	PF	PA	PD	Pts	Qualification
1	Bulgaria	3	3	0	212	184	+28	6	17th–20th place playoffs
2	Belarus	3	2	1	227	205	+22	5	17th–20th place playoffs
3	Albania	3	1	2	168	180	−12	4	21st–24th place playoffs
4	Luxembourg	3	0	3	171	209	−38	3	21st–24th place playoffs

Source: FIBA Archive
Rules for classification: 1) Points; 2) Head-to-head results; 3) Points difference; 4) Points scored.

==== Group J ====
Pos	Team	Pld	W	L	PF	PA	PD	Pts	Qualification
1	Scotland	3	2	1	228	226	+2	5	17th–20th place playoffs
2	Slovakia	3	2	1	224	189	+35	5	17th–20th place playoffs
3	Ireland	3	1	2	206	238	−32	4	21st–24th place playoffs
4	Macedonia	3	1	2	228	233	−5	4	21st–24th place playoffs

Source: FIBA Archive
Rules for classification: 1) Points; 2) Head-to-head results; 3) Points difference; 4) Points scored.

=== 9th–16th place groups ===
==== Group G ====
Pos	Team	Pld	W	L	PF	PA	PD	Pts	Qualification
1	Belgium	3	3	0	236	172	+64	6	9th–12th place playoffs
2	Netherlands	3	2	1	183	179	+4	5	9th–12th place playoffs
3	Switzerland	3	1	2	175	207	−32	4	13th–16th place playoffs
4	Estonia	3	0	3	183	219	−36	3	13th–16th place playoffs

Source: FIBA Archive
Rules for classification: 1) Points; 2) Head-to-head results; 3) Points difference; 4) Points scored.

==== Group H ====
Pos	Team	Pld	W	L	PF	PA	PD	Pts	Qualification
1	Denmark	3	2	1	237	225	+12	5	9th–12th place playoffs
2	Portugal	3	2	1	230	230	0	5	9th–12th place playoffs
3	Austria	3	1	2	203	213	−10	4	13th–16th place playoffs
4	Romania	3	1	2	214	216	−2	4	13th–16th place playoffs

Source: FIBA Archive
Rules for classification: 1) Points; 2) Head-to-head results; 3) Points difference; 4) Points scored.

=== Quarterfinal groups ===
==== Group E ====
Pos	Team	Pld	W	L	PF	PA	PD	Pts	Qualification
1	Slovenia	3	3	0	241	173	+68	6	Semifinals
2	Poland	3	2	1	213	183	+30	5	Semifinals
3	Hungary	3	1	2	163	234	−71	4	5th–8th place playoffs
4	England	3	0	3	186	213	−27	3	5th–8th place playoffs

Source: FIBA Archive
Rules for classification: 1) Points; 2) Head-to-head results; 3) Points difference; 4) Points scored.

==== Group F ====
Pos	Team	Pld	W	L	PF	PA	PD	Pts	Qualification
1	Israel	3	3	0	280	220	+60	6	Semifinals
2	Sweden	3	1	2	225	198	+27	4	Semifinals
3	Iceland	3	1	2	223	240	−17	4	5th–8th place playoffs
4	Georgia	3	1	2	204	274	−70	4	5th–8th place playoffs

Source: FIBA Archive
Rules for classification: 1) Points; 2) Head-to-head results; 3) Points difference; 4) Points scored.

== Playoff round ==
=== 21st–24th place playoffs ===
21st–24th place semifinals
1 August 2015
Albania	71
Macedonia	74
1 August 2015
Ireland	77
Luxembourg	67

21st place match
2 August 2015
Macedonia	84
Ireland	70
23rd place match
2 August 2015
Albania	64
Luxembourg	60

=== 17th–20th place playoffs ===
17th–20th place semifinals
1 August 2015
Bulgaria	51
Slovakia	72
1 August 2015
Scotland	72
Belarus	82

17th place match
2 August 2015
Slovakia	87
Belarus	78
19th place match
2 August 2015
Bulgaria	73
Scotland	62

=== 13th–16th place playoffs ===
13th–16th place semifinals
1 August 2015
Switzerland	56
Romania	51
1 August 2015
Austria	66
Estonia	62

13th place match
2 August 2015
Switzerland	76
Austria	79
15th place match
2 August 2015
Romania	57
Estonia	77

=== 9th–12th place playoffs ===
9th–12th semifinals
1 August 2015
Denmark	56
Netherlands	52
1 August 2015
Belgium	67
Portugal	61

9th place match
2 August 2015
Denmark	72
Belgium	103
11th place match
2 August 2015
Netherlands	78
Portugal	57

=== 5th–8th place playoffs ===
5th–8th place semifinals
1 August 2015
Hungary	75
Georgia	70
1 August 2015
Iceland	71
England	67

5th place match
2 August 2015
Hungary	84
Iceland	75
7th place match
2 August 2015
Georgia	71
England	76

=== 1st–4th place playoffs ===
Semifinals
1 August 2015
Slovenia	71
Sweden	78
1 August 2015
Israel	78
Poland	62

Final
2 August 2015
Sweden	73
Israel	72
3rd place match
2 August 2015
Slovenia	78
Poland	60

== Final standings ==
Rank	Team
1st place, gold medalist(s)	Sweden
2nd place, silver medalist(s)	Israel
3rd place, bronze medalist(s)	Slovenia
4	Poland
5	Hungary
6	Iceland
7	England
8	Georgia
9	Belgium
10	Denmark
11	Netherlands
12	Portugal
13	Austria
14	Switzerland
15	Estonia
16	Romania
17	Slovakia
18	Belarus
19	Bulgaria
20	Scotland
21	Macedonia
22	Ireland
23	Albania
24	Luxembourg

Promoted to the 2016 FIBA U18 European Championship Division A
