= Nathan Kuta =

Belgian-Dutch basketball player

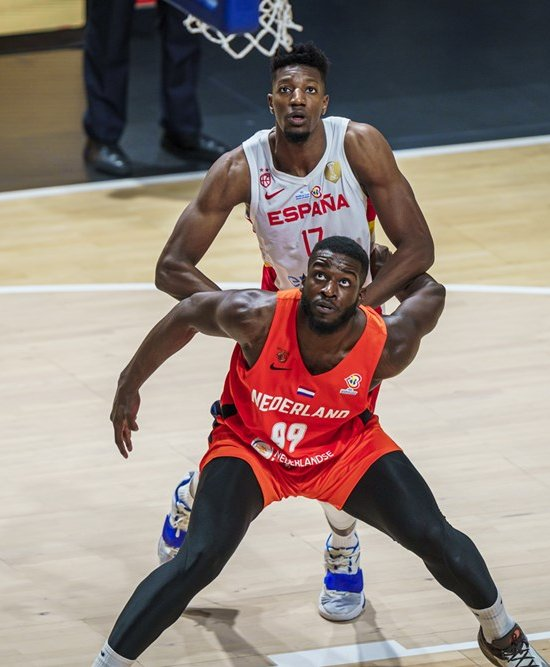
- Kuta (99) with the Netherlands national team

No. 99 – Le Mans
- Position: Power forward / center
- League: LNB Élite

Personal information
- Born: 28 April 2000 (age 26) Eindhoven, Netherlands
- Listed height: 2.04 m (6 ft 8 in)
- Listed weight: 110 kg (243 lb)

Career information
- Playing career: 2018–present

Career history
- 2018–2020: Limburg United
- 2020–2021: Okapi Aalst
- 2021–2024: Spirou
- 2024–2026: Orléans Loiret
- 2026: Maccabi Rishon LeZion
- 2026–present: Le Mans
Medals
Men's basketball
Representing the Netherlands
FIBA Europe U18 Championship Division B
Gold medal – first place	2018	National team

Nathan Kuta (Kuta Niayingwanda) (born 28 April 2000) is a Dutch professional basketball player for Le Mans of the French LNB Élite. He also represents the Netherlands internationally. Standing at 2.04 m (6 ft 8 1/2 in), Kuta plays as a power forward or center.

== Early career ==
Kuta was born in the Netherlands. When he was eleven years old, he moved with his family to Belgium. He started in Bree Basket in 2013 and the next year, he went to Cuva Houthalen. He played in U16, U18 and senior basketball with Cuva Houthalen, in the Belgian second division.

== Professional career ==
In August 2018, Kuta signed a one-year contract with Limburg United of the Belgian Pro Basketball League.

On 12 June 2020, Kuta signed with Okapi Aalst.

On 19 July 2021, Kuta signed a three-year contract with Spirou.

On June 28, 2024, he signed with Orléans Loiret of the LNB Pro B. On November 17, 2025, Kuta received a Hoops Agents Pro B Player of the Week award after having a double-double of 24 points and 10 rebounds.

== National team career ==
As a citizen of both Belgium and the Netherlands, Kuta had the option to choose either national team. Stating that he felt "that Belgium did not really believe in him", he chose the Netherlands. With the Under-18 team, Kuta won the 2018 FIBA Europe Under-18 Championship Division B. After the tournament, Kuta was named the most valuable player of the tournament after averaging 14.6 points and 10.9 rebounds per game.

On 16 November 2018, Kuta was selected by head coach Toon van Helfteren to be a part of the Netherlands senior team for the first time.

== Honors ==
Netherlands Under-18

- 2018 FIBA Europe Under-18 Championship Division B: Gold
- 2018 FIBA Europe Under-18 Championship Division B MVP
- 2018 FIBA Europe Under-18 Championship Division B All-Tournament Team
