= 2010 FIBA Europe Under-18 Championship Division B =

Tournament details
- Host country: Israel
- Teams: 20 (from 1 confederation)

Final positions
- Champions: Czech Republic (1st title)

Official website
- www.fibaeurope.com

The 2010 FIBA Europe Under-18 Championship Division B was an international basketball competition held in Israel in 2010.

== Final ranking ==
1. Czech Republic

2. Finland

3. Montenegro

4. Israel

5. Estonia

6. England

7. Belgium

8. Bosnia and Herzegovina

9. Belarus

10. Austria

11. Switzerland

12. Netherlands

13. Hungary

14. Scotland

15. Denmark

16. Luxembourg

17. Slovakia

18. Portugal

19. (Georgia (country)) Georgia

20. Romania

== Awards ==
Winners
Czech Republic
