= 2025 FIBA U18 EuroBasket Division B =

International youth basketball tournament

Tournament details
- Host country: Romania
- Cities: Pitești, Mioveni
- Dates: 25 July – 3 August 2025
- Teams: 22 (from 1 confederation)
- Venues: 3 (in 2 host cities)

Final positions
- Champions: Denmark (1st title)
- Runners-up: Estonia
- Third place: Slovakia
- Fourth place: Romania

Tournament statistics
- Games played: 81
- Attendance: 20,713 (256 per game)
- MVP: (Denmark) Noah Norgaard
- Top scorer: (Kosovo) Besim Bytyqi (22.1 ppg)

Official website
- www.fiba.basketball

The 2025 FIBA U18 EuroBasket Division B was the 19th edition of the Division B of the European basketball championship for men's national under-18 teams. The tournament was played in Pitești and Mioveni, Romania, from 25 July to 3 August 2025.

== Participating teams ==
- Azerbaijan ▲ (Winners, 2024 FIBA U18 EuroBasket Division C)
- Bosnia and Herzegovina
- Croatia ▼ (14th place, 2024 FIBA U18 EuroBasket Division A)
- Czech Republic
- Denmark ▼ (16th place, 2024 FIBA U18 EuroBasket Division A)
- Estonia
- Finland ▼ (15th place, 2024 FIBA U18 EuroBasket Division A)
- Georgia
- Great Britain
- Hungary
- Iceland
- Ireland
- Kosovo
- Montenegro
- Netherlands
- Norway
- Poland
- Portugal
- Romania
- Slovakia
- Switzerland
- Ukraine

== First round ==
The draw of the first round was held on 28 January 2025 in Freising, Germany.

In the first round, the teams were drawn into four groups. The first two teams from each group advanced to the quarterfinals; the third and fourth teams advanced to the 9th–16th place playoffs; the other teams advanced to the 17th–22nd place classification.

All times are local (Eastern European Summer Time; UTC+3).

=== Group A ===
Pos	Team	Pld	W	L	PF	PA	PD	Pts	Qualification
1	Poland	4	4	0	375	259	+116	8	Quarterfinals
2	Bosnia and Herzegovina	4	3	1	303	292	+11	7	Quarterfinals
3	Great Britain	4	2	2	289	294	−5	6	9th–16th place playoffs
4	Iceland	4	1	3	325	337	−12	5	9th–16th place playoffs
5	Ireland	4	0	4	261	371	−110	4	17th–22nd place classification

Source: FIBA

25 July 2025
13:00

Boxscore

Ireland	68–72	Great Britain
Scoring by quarter: 19–24, 18–15, 12–20, 19–13
Pts: Power 17; Rebs: Power 11; Asts: Charles 7		Pts: Ahamefule 15; Rebs: Davids 7 Asts: Babalola 4

Sala Sporturilor Mioveni
Attendance: 78
Referees: Michail Papaioannou (SUI), Frane Mjeda (CRO), Michal Scholze (CZE)

25 July 2025
15:30

Boxscore

Bosnia and Herzegovina	63–78	Poland
Scoring by quarter: 16–15, 14–20, 22–20, 11–23
Pts: Manojlovic 18; Rebs: Manojlovic 15; Asts: Bulajic 5		Pts: Lazarski 17; Rebs: Prochorowicz 12; Asts: Leniec 7

Pitești Arena
Attendance: 83
Referees: Ioannis Tiganis (GRE), László Goda (HUN), Oleksandr Oparin (UKR)

26 July 2025
13:00

Boxscore

Iceland	72–82	Bosnia and Herzegovina
Scoring by quarter: 15–22, 21–16, 16–24, 20–20
Pts: Gudmundsson 12; Rebs: Gudmundsson 10; Asts: Gudmundsson 5		Pts: Bulajic 21; Rebs: Manojlovic 17; Asts: three players 3

Sala Sporturilor Mioveni
Attendance: 45
Referees: Ioannis Tiganis (GRE), Ivo Kitsing (EST), Artjoms Ribakovs (SVK)

26 July 2025
18:00

Boxscore

Poland	107–47	Ireland
Scoring by quarter: 24–11, 19–14, 29–15, 35–7
Pts: Leniec 23; Rebs: Prochorowicz 7 Asts: Galewski 6		Pts: Quinn 13; Rebs: Quinn 7 Asts: Charles 3

Sala Sporturilor Pitești
Attendance: 55
Referees: Henri Hilke (FIN), Alexander Egil Reiertsen (NOR), Primož Pipan (SLO)

27 July 2025
13:00

Boxscore

Great Britain	72–84	Poland
Scoring by quarter: 15–23, 12–21, 23–17, 22–23
Pts: Ahamefule 20; Rebs: Ekufu, Ahamefule 7 Asts: Fyfe, Davids 3		Pts: Galewski 18; Rebs: Leniec 7 Asts: Galewski 10

Pitești Arena
Attendance: 125
Referees: Michail Papaioannou (SUI), Ivo Kitsing (EST), Artjoms Ribakovs (SVK)

27 July 2025
20:30

Boxscore

Ireland	73–105	Iceland
Scoring by quarter: 26–21, 17–25, 14–33, 16–26
Pts: Ogle 15; Rebs: Charles, Buzas 6 Asts: Quinn, Charles 3		Pts: Grissom 29; Rebs: Einarsson 8 Asts: Leifsson 9

Pitești Arena
Attendance: 149
Referees: Milosav Kaludjerovic (MNE), Frane Mjeda (CRO), Oleksandr Oparin (UKR)

29 July 2025
15:30

Boxscore

Bosnia and Herzegovina	87–73	Ireland
Scoring by quarter: 28–14, 23–12, 15–21, 21–26
Pts: Manojlovic 25; Rebs: Manojlovic 18; Asts: Kljestan 8		Pts: Burns 16; Rebs: Quinn 7 Asts: Quinn 4

Sala Sporturilor Mioveni
Attendance: 50
Referees: Ioannis Tiganis (GRE), Ivo Kitsing (EST), Elldin Uglari (KOS)

29 July 2025
15:30

Boxscore

Iceland	71–76	Great Britain
Scoring by quarter: 14–19, 13–26, 20–17, 24–14
Pts: Birnisson 12; Rebs: Gudmundsson 9 Asts: Leifsson 5		Pts: Davids, Ahamefule 14; Rebs: Davids 14; Asts: Davids 4

Sala Sporturilor Pitești
Attendance: 55
Referees: Zdravko Rutesic (MNE), Artjoms Ribakovs (SVK), Frane Mjeda (CRO)

30 July 2025
18:00

Boxscore

Poland	106–77	Iceland
Scoring by quarter: 20–23, 27–18, 29–14, 30–22
Pts: Galewski 17; Rebs: Niedzialkowski 10; Asts: Galewski 10		Pts: Hjartarson 14; Rebs: Gislason 6 Asts: Birnisson 5

Sala Sporturilor Mioveni
Attendance: 55
Referees: Zdravko Rutesic (MNE), Danilo Petkovic (SRB), Primož Pipan (SLO)

30 July 2025
20:30

Boxscore

Great Britain	69–71	Bosnia and Herzegovina
Scoring by quarter: 20–27, 18–20, 19–14, 12–10
Pts: Zajankauskas 17; Rebs: Zajankauskas 10; Asts: Fyfe 4		Pts: Bulajic 18; Rebs: Manojlovic 9 Asts: Kljestan 4

Pitești Arena
Attendance: 106
Referees: Henri Hilke (FIN), László Goda (HUN), Michal Scholze (CZE)

=== Group B ===
Pos	Team	Pld	W	L	PF	PA	PD	Pts	Qualification
1	Romania	5	4	1	375	304	+71	9	Quarterfinals
2	Denmark	5	4	1	409	333	+76	9	Quarterfinals
3	Portugal	5	4	1	351	328	+23	9	9th–16th place playoffs
4	Georgia	5	2	3	390	367	+23	7	9th–16th place playoffs
5	Ukraine	5	1	4	322	413	−91	6	17th–22nd place classification
6	Azerbaijan	5	0	5	270	372	−102	5	17th–22nd place classification

Source: FIBA

25 July 2025
18:00

Boxscore

Denmark	92–53	Ukraine
Scoring by quarter: 30–8, 14–15, 23–14, 25–16
Pts: Dalgaard-Duus 22; Rebs: Aaboe 7 Asts: Ziegler 8		Pts: Hohulenko 15; Rebs: Hohulenko 6 Asts: Hohulenko 2

Sala Sporturilor Pitești
Attendance: 74
Referees: Zdravko Rutesic (MNE), Artjoms Ribakovs (SVK), Elldin Uglari (KOS)

25 July 2025
18:00

Boxscore

Azerbaijan	34–60	Romania
Scoring by quarter: 7–25, 12–10, 7–16, 8–9
Pts: Huseynli 10; Rebs: Agbason 13; Asts: Agbason 3		Pts: Hurdubelea 11; Rebs: Rasoga 11; Asts: Dinu 4

Pitești Arena
Attendance: 1,037
Referees: Henri Hilke (FIN), Ivo Kitsing (EST), Alexander Egil Reiertsen (NOR)

25 July 2025
20:30

Boxscore

Portugal	65–61	Georgia
Scoring by quarter: 16–20, 16–11, 18–14, 15–16
Pts: Caetano 21; Rebs: Panzo 16; Asts: Caetano 6		Pts: Enukashvili 18; Rebs: Khatiashvili 8 Asts: Khatiashvili 12

Pitești Arena
Attendance: 86
Referees: Mart Uuehendrik (EST), Danilo Petkovic (SRB), Primož Pipan (SLO)

26 July 2025
15:30

Boxscore

Georgia	83–85	Denmark
Scoring by quarter: 24–13, 19–31, 23–20, 17–21
Pts: Tchirakadze 21; Rebs: Tchirakadze, Nikolaevi 8 Asts: Khatiashvili 5		Pts: Dalgaard-Duus 21; Rebs: Dada 10; Asts: Dalgaard-Duus, Rimdal 5

Sala Sporturilor Mioveni
Attendance: 54
Referees: Mart Uuehendrik (EST), László Goda (HUN), Michal Scholze (CZE)

26 July 2025
18:00

Boxscore

Romania	70–75	Portugal
Scoring by quarter: 11–13, 16–17, 22–19, 21–26
Pts: Rasoga 15; Rebs: Voiculescu, Horga 5 Asts: Dinu 4		Pts: Caetano 27; Rebs: Panzo 10; Asts: Figueira 3

Pitești Arena
Attendance: 1,473
Referees: Michail Papaioannou (SUI), Danilo Petkovic (SRB), Milosav Kaludjerovic (MNE)

26 July 2025
20:30

Boxscore

Ukraine	71–67 (OT)	Azerbaijan
Scoring by quarter: 10–14, 12–12, 16–24, 23–11, Overtime: 10–6
Pts: Hohulenko 17; Rebs: Sinnik 13; Asts: Hohulenko 6		Pts: Berkoz 13; Rebs: Mammadov 10; Asts: Berkoz 5

Sala Sporturilor Mioveni
Attendance: 24
Referees: Zdravko Rutesic (MNE), Frane Mjeda (CRO), Ngadhnjim Shabani (KOS)

27 July 2025
15:30

Boxscore

Denmark	84–72	Portugal
Scoring by quarter: 31–19, 23–19, 18–26, 12–8
Pts: Norgaard 23; Rebs: Katholm 7 Asts: Dalgaard-Duus 5		Pts: Figueira 14; Rebs: Panzo 9 Asts: Caetano 3

Sala Sporturilor Mioveni
Attendance: 85
Referees: Mart Uuehendrik (EST), Ioannis Tiganis (GRE), Ngadhnjim Shabani (KOS)

27 July 2025
15:30

Boxscore

Azerbaijan	66–82	Georgia
Scoring by quarter: 12–24, 16–18, 24–12, 14–28
Pts: Berkoz 20; Rebs: Berkoz 12; Asts: three players 2		Pts: Kavlashvili 39; Rebs: Tchirakadze 16; Asts: Khatiashvili 6

Sala Sporturilor Pitești
Attendance: 57
Referees: Zdravko Rutesic (MNE), Dimitar Georgiev (BUL), Danilo Petkovic (SRB)

27 July 2025
18:00

Boxscore

Ukraine	67–90	Romania
Scoring by quarter: 17–26, 14–24, 15–21, 21–19
Pts: Leskiv 15; Rebs: Sinnik 9 Asts: Zmiievskyi 3		Pts: Dubuc, Dinu 13; Rebs: Dinu 13; Asts: Rasoga 6

Pitești Arena
Attendance: 1,127
Referees: Henri Hilke (FIN), László Goda (HUN), Elldin Uglari (KOS)

29 July 2025
13:00

Boxscore

Georgia	93–72	Ukraine
Scoring by quarter: 25–17, 22–24, 20–17, 26–14
Pts: Tabaghua, Khatiashvili 27; Rebs: Tchirakadze 9 Asts: Khatiashvili 6		Pts: Hohulenko 19; Rebs: Sinnik 12; Asts: three players 3

Sala Sporturilor Mioveni
Attendance: 56
Referees: Mart Uuehendrik (EST), László Goda (HUN), Michal Scholze (CZE)

29 July 2025
15:30

Boxscore

Portugal	68–54	Azerbaijan
Scoring by quarter: 15–13, 22–17, 12–12, 19–12
Pts: Caetano, Panzo 16; Rebs: Panzo 17; Asts: Caetano 7		Pts: Huseynli 19; Rebs: Huseynli 12; Asts: Hummatov, Suleymanli 3

Pitești Arena
Attendance: 129
Referees: Henri Hilke (FIN), Alexander Egil Reiertsen (NOR), Danilo Petkovic (SRB)

29 July 2025
18:00

Boxscore

Romania	76–57	Denmark
Scoring by quarter: 25–17, 13–19, 17–4, 21–17
Pts: Dinu 20; Rebs: Voiculescu 9 Asts: Dinu 8		Pts: Katholm 12; Rebs: Aaboe 9 Asts: Norgaard 6

Pitești Arena
Attendance: 1,411
Referees: Michail Papaioannou (SUI), Milosav Kaludjerovic (MNE), Primož Pipan (SLO)

30 July 2025
13:00

Boxscore

Azerbaijan	49–91	Denmark
Scoring by quarter: 9–22, 16–10, 14–32, 10–27
Pts: Huseynli 11; Rebs: Agbason 11; Asts: Guliyev 2		Pts: Dalgaard-Duus 15; Rebs: Kouakou 6 Asts: Dalgaard-Duus, Burkhardt 4

Sala Sporturilor Mioveni
Attendance: 43
Referees: Mart Uuehendrik (EST), Frane Mjeda (CRO), Elldin Uglari (KOS)

30 July 2025
18:00

Boxscore

Georgia	71–79	Romania
Scoring by quarter: 21–23, 18–27, 16–11, 16–18
Pts: Khatiashvili 21; Rebs: Tchirakadze 13; Asts: Khatiashvili 4		Pts: Rasoga, Fometescu 13; Rebs: three players 5 Asts: Rasoga, Dinu 6

Pitești Arena
Attendance: 2,150
Referees: Ioannis Tiganis (GRE), Ivo Kitsing (EST), Alexander Egil Reiertsen (NOR)

30 July 2025
20:30

Boxscore

Ukraine	59–71	Portugal
Scoring by quarter: 12–14, 15–13, 21–25, 11–19
Pts: Hohulenko 11; Rebs: Sinnik, Trofimov 7 Asts: Ziegelshiffer 5		Pts: Caetano 18; Rebs: Panzo 15; Asts: Panzo 6

Sala Sporturilor Mioveni
Attendance: 50
Referees: Michail Papaioannou (SUI), Milosav Kaludjerovic (MNE), Artjoms Ribakovs (SVK)

=== Group C ===
Pos	Team	Pld	W	L	PF	PA	PD	Pts	Qualification
1	Estonia	5	5	0	415	331	+84	10	Quarterfinals
2	Hungary	5	4	1	420	315	+105	9	Quarterfinals
3	Switzerland	5	3	2	380	387	−7	8	9th–16th place playoffs
4	Czechia	5	2	3	361	380	−19	7	9th–16th place playoffs
5	Finland	5	1	4	343	420	−77	6	17th–22nd place classification
6	Kosovo	5	0	5	351	437	−86	5	17th–22nd place classification

Source: FIBA

25 July 2025
15:30

Boxscore

Finland	58–79	Estonia
Scoring by quarter: 9–23, 20–18, 15–27, 14–11
Pts: Adler 13; Rebs: three players 5 Asts: Mainio, Adler 2		Pts: Avdejev 20; Rebs: Avdejev 9 Asts: Kullamäe, Vuks 6

Sala Sporturilor Pitești
Attendance: 51
Referees: Marius Ciulin (ROU), Mikheil Vartanov (GEO), Luís Daniel Mascarenhas De Oliveira (POR)

25 July 2025
18:00

Boxscore

Kosovo	66–91	Hungary
Scoring by quarter: 15–27, 27–19, 14–21, 10–24
Pts: Nixha 18; Rebs: Tafilaj 12; Asts: Bacevac 4		Pts: Lukacsi 26; Rebs: Mezofi 10; Asts: Lukacsi 5

Sala Sporturilor Mioveni
Attendance: 50
Referees: Amalia Marchiş (ROU), Yurii Shcherbak (UKR), Michal Kuzia (POL)

25 July 2025
20:30

Boxscore

Czechia	72–90	Switzerland
Scoring by quarter: 13–22, 17–18, 16–21, 26–29
Pts: Smazak 14; Rebs: Koulisianis 10; Asts: Smazak 5		Pts: Diakite 24; Rebs: Diakite, Zumstein 11; Asts: Cokara 4

Sala Sporturilor Mioveni
Attendance: 100
Referees: Emmouil Tsolakos (GRE), Denys Povorozniuk (UKR), Hasan Bajgoric (BIH)

26 July 2025
15:30

Boxscore

Hungary	64–49	Czechia
Scoring by quarter: 15–11, 21–4, 14–16, 14–18
Pts: Flasar 16; Rebs: Flasar 11; Asts: Lukacsi 7		Pts: Smazak 15; Rebs: three players 6 Asts: Smazak 3

Sala Sporturilor Pitești
Attendance: 50
Referees: Marius Ciulin (ROU), Emmouil Tsolakos (GRE), Oleksandr Oparin (UKR)

26 July 2025
15:30

Boxscore

Switzerland	79–70	Finland
Scoring by quarter: 11–21, 26–17, 18–14, 24–18
Pts: Riethauser 26; Rebs: Diakite 13; Asts: Bernegger 5		Pts: Adler 20; Rebs: Eskelinen 13; Asts: Pallijeff, Korhonen 5

Pitești Arena
Attendance: 120
Referees: Ilias Karpanos (GRE), Stefan Zdravkovic (SRB), Michal Kuzia (POL)

26 July 2025
20:30

Boxscore

Estonia	95–61	Kosovo
Scoring by quarter: 22–19, 32–17, 26–10, 15–15
Pts: Pertel, Adamson 15; Rebs: Pertel 12; Asts: Kullamäe 9		Pts: Bytyqi 18; Rebs: Tafilaj, Tusuni 7 Asts: Bacevac, Bytyqi 5

Pitești Arena
Attendance: 122
Referees: Denys Povorozniuk (UKR), Urfan Bayramli (AZE), Hasan Bajgoric (BIH)

27 July 2025
13:00

Boxscore

Finland	75–84	Czechia
Scoring by quarter: 20–27, 17–12, 20–18, 18–27
Pts: Adler 19; Rebs: Saivosalmi 8 Asts: Adler 4		Pts: Smazak 26; Rebs: Nohel 8 Asts: Krob 5

Sala Sporturilor Mioveni
Attendance: 78
Referees: Elvis Binders-Coders (LAT), Yurii Shcherbak (UKR), Hasan Bajgoric (BIH)

27 July 2025
18:00

Boxscore

Estonia	84–72	Hungary
Scoring by quarter: 18–22, 23–15, 23–14, 20–21
Pts: Vuks 16; Rebs: Avdejev 12; Asts: Kullamäe 5		Pts: Lukacsi 16; Rebs: Flasar, Rosta 6 Asts: Flasar 5

Sala Sporturilor Mioveni
Attendance: 56
Referees: Emmouil Tsolakos (GRE), Stefan Zdravkovic (SRB), Primož Pipan (SLO)

27 July 2025
20:30

Boxscore

Kosovo	77–81	Switzerland
Scoring by quarter: 17–19, 17–12, 19–30, 24–20
Pts: Bytyqi 25; Rebs: Tafilaj 15; Asts: Bytyqi 12		Pts: Riethauser 26; Rebs: Riethauser, Zumstein 7 Asts: three players 4

Sala Sporturilor Mioveni
Attendance: 50
Referees: Mikheil Vartanov (GEO), Urfan Bayramli (AZE), Michal Kuzia (POL)

29 July 2025
18:00

Boxscore

Switzerland	69–75	Estonia
Scoring by quarter: 11–19, 19–16, 26–24, 13–16
Pts: Riethauser 14; Rebs: Riethauser 9 Asts: Riethauser 3		Pts: Adamson, Tomann 15; Rebs: Avdejev 16; Asts: Kullamäe 6

Sala Sporturilor Mioveni
Attendance: 47
Referees: Marius Ciulin (ROU), Yurii Shcherbak (UKR), Oleksandr Oparin (UKR)

29 July 2025
18:00

Boxscore

Czechia	85–69	Kosovo
Scoring by quarter: 27–21, 16–16, 23–16, 19–16
Pts: Koulisianis 16; Rebs: Nohel 10; Asts: Smazak 5		Pts: Bytyqi 24; Rebs: Tafilaj 17; Asts: Bytyqi 6

Sala Sporturilor Pitești
Attendance: 30
Referees: Ilias Karpanos (GRE), Denys Povorozniuk (UKR), Michal Kuzia (POL)

29 July 2025
20:30

Boxscore

Hungary	100–55	Finland
Scoring by quarter: 21–21, 32–6, 27–15, 20–13
Pts: Rosta 16; Rebs: Rosta 12; Asts: Flasar 9		Pts: Adler 11; Rebs: Adler 7 Asts: Adler 6

Pitești Arena
Attendance: 50
Referees: Vlad-Theodor Cotrobas-Dascalu (ROU), Urfan Bayramli (AZE), Ruslan Khaligov (AZE)

30 July 2025
13:00

Boxscore

Estonia	82–71	Czechia
Scoring by quarter: 18–14, 33–21, 21–17, 10–19
Pts: Pertel 14; Rebs: Pertel 11; Asts: Kullamäe 8		Pts: Koulisianis 21; Rebs: Pospichal 5 Asts: Smazak 6

Pitești Arena
Attendance: 20
Referees: Emmouil Tsolakos (GRE), Stefan Zdravkovic (SRB), Ruslan Khaligov (AZE)

30 July 2025
15:30

Boxscore

Switzerland	61–93	Hungary
Scoring by quarter: 12–27, 14–29, 11–20, 24–17
Pts: Diakite 22; Rebs: Diakite 6 Asts: Bernegger 4		Pts: Mezofi 22; Rebs: Rosta 8 Asts: Lukacsi 7

Pitești Arena
Attendance: 50
Referees: Elvis Binders-Coders (LAT), Denys Povorozniuk (UKR), Amalia Marchiş (ROU)

30 July 2025
15:30

Boxscore

Kosovo	78–85	Finland
Scoring by quarter: 16–17, 19–21, 18–25, 25–22
Pts: Bytyqi 26; Rebs: Tusuni 14; Asts: Jashari, Bytyqi 4		Pts: Adler 24; Rebs: Eskelinen 9 Asts: Pallijeff 6

Sala Sporturilor Mioveni
Attendance: 30
Referees: Mikheil Vartanov (GEO), Dimitar Georgiev (BUL), Luís Daniel Mascarenhas De Oliveira (POR)

=== Group D ===
Pos	Team	Pld	W	L	PF	PA	PD	Pts	Qualification
1	Slovakia	4	3	1	288	251	+37	7	Quarterfinals
2	Montenegro	4	3	1	325	304	+21	7	Quarterfinals
3	Croatia	4	3	1	337	256	+81	7	9th–16th place playoffs
4	Netherlands	4	1	3	268	267	+1	5	9th–16th place playoffs
5	Norway	4	0	4	251	391	−140	4	17th–22nd place classification

Source: FIBA

25 July 2025
13:00

Boxscore

Norway	73–92	Montenegro
Scoring by quarter: 22–24, 15–21, 19–29, 17–18
Pts: Langerod, Holsaeter 15; Rebs: Langerod 6 Asts: Holsaeter 4		Pts: Đukanović 19; Rebs: Gulić 13; Asts: Komnenović, Brnović 4

Pitești Arena
Attendance: 88
Referees: Ilias Karpanos (GRE), Stefan Zdravković (SRB), Ruslan Khaligov (AZE)

25 July 2025
15:30

Boxscore

Slovakia	57–58	Croatia
Scoring by quarter: 16–11, 17–13, 12–18, 12–16
Pts: Kubala 15; Rebs: Golian 11; Asts: Pukančík 7		Pts: Bičić 22; Rebs: Katanović 9 Asts: Bicic 2

Sala Sporturilor Mioveni
Attendance: 59
Referees: Elvis Binders-Coders (LAT), Vlad-Theodor Cotrobas-Dascalu (ROU), Dimitar Georgiev (BUL)

26 July 2025
13:00

Boxscore

Netherlands	55–62	Slovakia
Scoring by quarter: 15–10, 13–16, 17–20, 10–16
Pts: Aiyamenkhue 21; Rebs: Aiyamenkhue 16; Asts: van la Parra 4		Pts: Randuška 29; Rebs: Golian 13; Asts: Gregor 5

Pitești Arena
Attendance: 84
Referees: Elvis Binders-Coders (LAT), Amalia Marchiş (ROU), Vlad-Theodor Cotrobas-Dascalu (ROU)

26 July 2025
18:00

Boxscore

Croatia	129–53	Norway
Scoring by quarter: 29–16, 33–10, 38–11, 29–16
Pts: Salamunic 22; Rebs: Marić 9 Asts: Katanovic 7		Pts: Berbusmel 10; Rebs: Ceperuelo, Dahlberg 5 Asts: Argatu 3

Sala Sporturilor Mioveni
Attendance: 74
Referees: Mikheil Vartanov (GEO), Dimitar Georgiev (BUL), Yurii Shcherbak (UKR)

27 July 2025
15:30

Boxscore

Montenegro	85–80	Croatia
Scoring by quarter: 35–17, 24–19, 14–22, 12–22
Pts: Đukanovic 19; Rebs: Brnović 11; Asts: Mugosa 5		Pts: Katanović 19; Rebs: Gulan 7 Asts: Bičić 5

Pitești Arena
Attendance: 136
Referees: Marius Ciulin (ROU), Denys Povorozniuk (UKR), Luís Daniel Mascarenhas De Oliveira (POR)

27 July 2025
18:00

Boxscore

Norway	55–76	Netherlands
Scoring by quarter: 8–17, 10–18, 21–18, 16–23
Pts: Berbusmel 16; Rebs: Ronning 9 Asts: Berbusmel 5		Pts: Aiyamenkhue, Anike 12; Rebs: Slingerland 12; Asts: three players 3

Sala Sporturilor Pitești
Attendance: 90
Referees: Vlad-Theodor Cotrobas-Dascalu (ROU), Amalia Marchiş (ROU), Ruslan Khaligov (AZE)

29 July 2025
13:00

Boxscore

Slovakia	94–70	Norway
Scoring by quarter: 30–21, 24–15, 18–23, 22–11
Pts: Randuška 22; Rebs: Stanko 7 Asts: Minarovjech 7		Pts: Langerod 24; Rebs: Ronning 10; Asts: Lilledahl 4

Pitești Arena
Attendance: 121
Referees: Mikheil Vartanov (GEO), Amalia Marchiş (ROU), Luís Daniel Mascarenhas De Oliveira (POR)

29 July 2025
20:30

Boxscore

Netherlands	76–80 (OT)	Montenegro
Scoring by quarter: 23–15, 17–21, 17–11, 11–21, Overtime: 8–12
Pts: Gipson, van Wayenburg 15; Rebs: Aiyamenkhue, van Wayenburg 10; Asts: van la Parra 5		Pts: Komnenović 26; Rebs: Gulić 9 Asts: Komnenovic 5

Sala Sporturilor Mioveni
Attendance: 148
Referees: Elvis Binders-Coders (LAT), Emmouil Tsolakos (GRE), Dimitar Georgiev (BUL)

30 July 2025
15:30

Boxscore

Croatia	70–61	Netherlands
Scoring by quarter: 20–11, 12–22, 15–14, 23–14
Pts: Bičić 21; Rebs: Santro 9 Asts: Bubalo 6		Pts: Slingerland 14; Rebs: Slingerland 14; Asts: Anike 9

Sala Sporturilor Pitești
Attendance: 107
Referees: Marius Ciulin (ROU), Vlad-Theodor Cotrobas-Dascalu (ROU), Hasan Bajgorić (BIH)

30 July 2025
18:00

Boxscore

Montenegro	68–75	Slovakia
Scoring by quarter: 18–17, 19–25, 18–22, 13–11
Pts: Komnenović 14; Rebs: Đukanović 10; Asts: Komnenovic 6		Pts: Randuška 17; Rebs: Minarovjech 8 Asts: Minarovjech 5

Sala Sporturilor Pitești
Attendance: 86
Referees: Ilias Karpanos (GRE), Yurii Shcherbak (UKR), Urfan Bayramli (AZE)

== 17th–22nd place classification ==
=== Group E ===
Pos	Team	Pld	W	L	PF	PA	PD	Pts	Qualification
1	Ukraine	2	2	0	147	118	+29	4	17th place match
2	Ireland	2	1	1	113	133	−20	3	19th place match
3	Azerbaijan	2	0	2	124	133	−9	2	21st place match

Source: FIBA

1 August 2025
15:30

Boxscore

Azerbaijan	57–62	Ireland
Scoring by quarter: 11–16, 12–13, 26–14, 8–19
Pts: Berkoz 19; Rebs: Berkoz 11; Asts: Guliyev 3		Pts: Quinn 21; Rebs: Quinn 9 Asts: Charles 7

Sala Sporturilor Pitești
Attendance: 50
Referees: Mikheil Vartanov (GEO), Stefan Zdravkovic (SRB), Hasan Bajgoric (BIH)

2 August 2025
15:30

Boxscore

Ireland	51–76	Ukraine
Scoring by quarter: 12–12, 12–21, 10–22, 17–21
Pts: Gbinigie 18; Rebs: Power 5 Asts: Charles 6		Pts: Bilous 17; Rebs: Bilous 10; Asts: three players 3

Sala Sporturilor Pitesti
Attendance: 55
Referees: Amalia Marchiş (ROU), Ivo Kitsing (EST), Primož Pipan (SLO)

=== Group F ===
Pos	Team	Pld	W	L	PF	PA	PD	Pts	Qualification
1	Finland	2	2	0	167	134	+33	4	17th place match
2	Norway	2	1	1	138	158	−20	3	19th place match
3	Kosovo	2	0	2	154	167	−13	2	21st place match

Source: FIBA

1 August 2025
18:00

Boxscore

Kosovo	76–82	Norway
Scoring by quarter: 18–22, 16–17, 24–17, 18–26
Pts: Tafilaj 22; Rebs: Tafilaj 14; Asts: Bytyqi 6		Pts: Holsaeter 15; Rebs: Ronning 8 Asts: Lilledahl 4

Sala Sporturilor Pitești
Attendance: 71
Referees: Mart Uuehendrik (EST), Luís Daniel Mascarenhas De Oliveira (POR), Michal Kuzia (POL)

2 August 2025
18:00

Boxscore

Norway	56–82	Finland
Scoring by quarter: 15–20, 13–27, 12–14, 16–21
Pts: Dahlberg 17; Rebs: Ceperuelo, Olsen 7 Asts: Berbusmel 5		Pts: Adler 17; Rebs: Saivosalmi, Eskelinen 10; Asts: Saivosalmi 5

Sala Sporturilor Pitesti
Attendance: 35
Referees: Mart Uuehendrik (EST), László Goda (HUN), Elldin Uglari (KOS)

=== 21st place match ===
3 August 2025
15:30

Boxscore

Azerbaijan	81–77	Kosovo
Scoring by quarter: 23–21, 20–14, 22–26, 16–16
Pts: Berkoz 26; Rebs: Abdullayev, Agbason 8 Asts: Berkoz 6		Pts: Bytyqi 32; Rebs: Tusuni 13; Asts: Bacevac, Bytyqi 6

Sala Sporturilor Pitești
Attendance: 287
Referees: Ioannis Tiganis (GRE), Artjoms Ribakovs (SVK), Alexander Egil Reiertsen (NOR)

=== 19th place match ===
3 August 2025
18:00

Boxscore

Ireland	61–63	Norway
Scoring by quarter: 26–15, 6–23, 14–9, 15–16
Pts: Charles, Ogle 15; Rebs: Quinn, Charles 7 Asts: Charles 6		Pts: Ronning 15; Rebs: Ronning 13; Asts: Berbusmel 7

Sala Sporturilor Pitești
Attendance: 45
Referees: Mikheil Vartanov (GEO), Ngadhnjim Shabani (KOS), Luís Daniel Mascarenhas De Oliveira (POR)

=== 17th place match ===
3 August 2025
15:30

Boxscore

Ukraine	67–65	Finland
Scoring by quarter: 21–12, 15–22, 13–17, 18–14
Pts: Trofimov 20; Rebs: Ryzhkov 9 Asts: Hohulenko 6		Pts: Saivosalmi 13; Rebs: three players 8 Asts: Adler 2

Sala Sporturilor Pitești
Attendance: 30
Referees: Milosav Kaludjerovic (MNE), Primož Pipan (SLO), Urfan Bayramli (AZE)

== 9th–16th place playoffs ==
13th place match
Czechia	67
Switzerland	63
15th place match
Great Britain	71
Iceland	93

13th–16th place semifinals
Great Britain	70
Czechia	85
Iceland	81
Switzerland	95

9th–16th place quarterfinals
A3	Great Britain	76
B4	Georgia	100
D3	Croatia	91
C4	Czechia	84
B3	Portugal	85
A4	Iceland	74
C3	Switzerland	70
D4	Netherlands	96

9th–12th place semifinals
Georgia	62
Croatia	82
Portugal	63
Netherlands	66

9th place match
Croatia	62
Netherlands	67
11th place match
Georgia	62
Portugal	66

=== 9th–16th place quarterfinals ===
1 August 2025
13:00

Boxscore

Great Britain	76–100	Georgia
Scoring by quarter: 22–24, 13–23, 29–26, 12–27
Pts: Fyfe 22; Rebs: Ahamefule 8 Asts: Davids 3		Pts: Khatiashvili 22; Rebs: Nikolaevi 7 Asts: Dokhnadze 5

Sala Sporturilor Mioveni
Attendance: 25
Referees: Amalia Marchiş (ROU), Vlad-Theodor Cotrobas-Dascalu (ROU), Alexander Egil Reiertsen (NOR)

1 August 2025
15:30

Boxscore

Croatia	91–84	Czechia
Scoring by quarter: 24–16, 17–23, 23–27, 27–18
Pts: Katanović 19; Rebs: Katanović 10; Asts: Bubalo 9		Pts: Koulisianis 17; Rebs: Smazak 7 Asts: Smazak 10

Sala Sporturilor Mioveni
Attendance: 54
Referees: Ioannis Tiganis (GRE), Yurii Shcherbak (UKR), Elldin Uglari (KOS)

1 August 2025
18:00

Boxscore

Portugal	85–74	Iceland
Scoring by quarter: 26–10, 22–21, 20–16, 17–27
Pts: Panzo 17; Rebs: Panzo 12; Asts: Caetano 6		Pts: Gudmundsson 14; Rebs: Leifsson 9 Asts: Steinsen 4

Sala Sporturilor Mioveni
Attendance: 71
Referees: Milosav Kaluđerović (MNE), Denys Povorozniuk (UKR), Frane Mjeda (CRO)

1 August 2025
20:30

Boxscore

Switzerland	70–96	Netherlands
Scoring by quarter: 20–30, 22–22, 18–25, 10–19
Pts: Riethauser 29; Rebs: Zumstein 5 Asts: Cokara 6		Pts: Slingerland 26; Rebs: Aiyamenkhue 15; Asts: Anike 8

Sala Sporturilor Mioveni
Attendance: 76
Referees: Emmouil Tsolakos (GRE), Ruslan Khaligov (AZE), Primož Pipan (SLO)

=== 13th–16th place semifinals ===
2 August 2025
13:00

Boxscore

Great Britain	70–85	Czechia
Scoring by quarter: 17–21, 23–23, 16–15, 14–26
Pts: Ahamefule 18; Rebs: Davids 6 Asts: Fyfe 5		Pts: Smazak 27; Rebs: Sadovsky 10; Asts: Smazak 4

Sala Sporturilor Mioveni
Attendance: 65
Referees: Milosav Kaluđerović (MNE), Luís Daniel Mascarenhas De Oliveira (POR), Ruslan Khaligov (AZE)

2 August 2025
15:30

Boxscore

Iceland	81–95	Switzerland
Scoring by quarter: 13–23, 27–17, 23–28, 18–27
Pts: Gudmundsson 18; Rebs: Gudmundsson 8 Asts: Birmingham 4		Pts: Riethauser 34; Rebs: Riethauser, Zumstein 7 Asts: Zumstein 7

Sala Sporturilor Mioveni
Attendance: 88
Referees: Henri Hilke (FIN), Stefan Zdravkovic (SRB), Urfan Bayramli (AZE)

=== 15th place match ===
3 August 2025
13:00

Boxscore

Great Britain	71–93	Iceland
Scoring by quarter: 13–34, 16–15, 27–22, 15–22
Pts: Ekufu 13; Rebs: Ahamefule 9 Asts: Fyfe 3		Pts: Gudmundsson 30; Rebs: Leifsson 6 Asts: Birnisson 4

Sala Sporturilor Mioveni
Attendance: 50
Referees: Yurii Shcherbak (UKR), Hasan Bajgorić (BIH), Frane Mjeda (CRO)

=== 13th place match ===
3 August 2025
11:00

Boxscore

Czechia	67–63	Switzerland
Scoring by quarter: 11–18, 18–11, 21–15, 17–19
Pts: Smazak 30; Rebs: Pospichal 7 Asts: Strelba 5		Pts: Diakite 19; Rebs: Diallo 12; Asts: Bernegger 5

Sala Sporturilor Mioveni
Attendance: 80
Referees: Ilias Karpanos (GRE), Danilo Petković (SRB), Elldin Uglari (KOS)

=== 9th–12th place semifinals ===
2 August 2025
18:00

Boxscore

Georgia	62–82	Croatia
Scoring by quarter: 18–16, 7–23, 18–19, 19–24
Pts: Tchirakadze 24; Rebs: Tabaghua, Dokhnadze 7 Asts: Tabaghua 5		Pts: Katanović 27; Rebs: Katanović 8 Asts: Bičić 5

Sala Sporturilor Mioveni
Attendance: 50
Referees: Ilias Karpanos (GRE), Oleksandr Oparin (UKR), Michal Kuzia (POL)

2 August 2025
20:30

Boxscore

Portugal	63–66	Netherlands
Scoring by quarter: 16–25, 13–23, 16–12, 18–6
Pts: Caetano 16; Rebs: Camacho, Panzo 7 Asts: Camacho 4		Pts: Slingerland 18; Rebs: Aiyamenkhue 12; Asts: Gipson 6

Sala Sporturilor Mioveni
Attendance: 194
Referees: Elvis Binders-Coders (LAT), Artjoms Ribakovs (SVK), Hasan Bajgoric (BIH)

=== 11th place match ===
3 August 2025
18:30

Boxscore

Georgia	62–66	Portugal
Scoring by quarter: 15–15, 18–14, 15–22, 14–15
Pts: Tchirakadze 15; Rebs: Tchirakadze 10; Asts: Tchuadze 7		Pts: Panzo 14; Rebs: Panzo 5 Asts: three players 3

Sala Sporturilor Mioveni
Attendance: 100
Referees: Mart Uuehendrik (EST), Oleksandr Oparin (UKR), Stefan Zdravković (SRB)

=== 9th place match ===
3 August 2025
16:00

Boxscore

Croatia	62–67	Netherlands
Scoring by quarter: 13–21, 17–13, 24–16, 8–17
Pts: Katanovic 26; Rebs: Bičić, Dujaković 8 Asts: Bičić 4		Pts: Slingerland 18; Rebs: Aiyamenkhue 13; Asts: Anike 6

Sala Sporturilor Mioveni
Attendance: 150
Referees: Vlad-Theodor Cotrobas-Dascalu (ROU), Denys Povorozniuk (UKR), Ruslan Khaligov (AZE)

== Championship playoffs ==
5th place match
Hungary	82
Montenegro	85
7th place match
Poland	84
Bosnia and Herzegovina	97

5th–8th place semifinals
Poland	67
Hungary	99
Bosnia and Herzegovina	76
Montenegro	85

Quarterfinals
A1	Poland	74
B2	Denmark	93
D1	Slovakia	64
C2	Hungary	63
B1	Romania	70
A2	Bosnia and Herzegovina	63
C1	Estonia	79
D2	Montenegro	74

Semifinals
Denmark	70
Slovakia	57
Romania	47
Estonia	71

Final
Denmark	83
Estonia	77
3rd place match
Slovakia	85
Romania	52

=== Quarterfinals ===
1 August 2025
13:00

Boxscore

Poland	74–93	Denmark
Scoring by quarter: 13–23, 25–19, 13–24, 23–27
Pts: Galewski 14; Rebs: Chalicki 7 Asts: Galewski 4		Pts: Norgaard, Rimdal 24; Rebs: Aaboe 13; Asts: Dada 4

Pitești Arena
Attendance: 88
Referees: Zdravko Rutesic (MNE), Henri Hilke (FIN), Ivo Kitsing (EST)

1 August 2025
15:30

Boxscore

Slovakia	64–63	Hungary
Scoring by quarter: 16–19, 13–15, 19–12, 16–17
Pts: Randuška 14; Rebs: Golian 9 Asts: Minarovjech 4		Pts: Lukacsi 22; Rebs: Mezofi 9 Asts: Flasar 5

Pitești Arena
Attendance: 115
Referees: Marius Ciulin (ROU), Danilo Petkovic (SRB), Dimitar Georgiev (BUL)

1 August 2025
18:00

Boxscore

Romania	70–63	Bosnia and Herzegovina
Scoring by quarter: 12–15, 25–17, 11–13, 22–18
Pts: Rasoga 18; Rebs: Voiculescu 8 Asts: Dinu 6		Pts: Manojlović 13; Rebs: Manojlović 10; Asts: Bulajić 6

Pitești Arena
Attendance: 2,100
Referees: Michail Papaioannou (SUI), Artjoms Ribakovs (SVK), Michal Scholze (CZE)

1 August 2025
20:30

Boxscore

Estonia	79–74	Montenegro
Scoring by quarter: 27–12, 22–18, 10–26, 20–18
Pts: Kullamäe 22; Rebs: Kullamäe, Avdejev 9 Asts: Kullamäe 11		Pts: Ivelja 17; Rebs: Gulić 11; Asts: Nikezić, Komnenović 5

Pitești Arena
Attendance: 100
Referees: Elvis Binders-Coders (LAT), Ilias Karpanos (GRE), Oleksandr Oparin (UKR)

=== 5th–8th place semifinals ===
2 August 2025
13:00

Boxscore

Poland	67–99	Hungary
Scoring by quarter: 12–22, 20–24, 11–24, 24–29
Pts: Galewski, Czapla 13; Rebs: three players 4 Asts: Galewski 6		Pts: Lukacsi 26; Rebs: Asztalos 10; Asts: Flasar 10

Pitești Arena
Attendance: 67
Referees: Marius Ciulin (ROU), Yurii Shcherbak (UKR), Michal Scholze (CZE)

2 August 2025
15:30

Boxscore

Bosnia and Herzegovina	76–85	Montenegro
Scoring by quarter: 18–21, 18–25, 19–26, 21–13
Pts: Manojlović 22; Rebs: Manojlović 13; Asts: Bulajić 8		Pts: Nikezić 24; Rebs: Krnić, Đukanović 6 Asts: Đukanović 6

Pitești Arena
Attendance: 70
Referees: Mikheil Vartanov (GEO), Vlad-Theodor Cotrobas-Dascalu (ROU), Denys Povorozniuk (UKR)

=== 7th place match ===
3 August 2025
13:30

Boxscore

Poland	84–97	Bosnia and Herzegovina
Scoring by quarter: 14–17, 21–33, 26–22, 23–25
Pts: Czapla, Chac 17; Rebs: Kenig 10; Asts: Czapla 6		Pts: Bulajić 27; Rebs: Manojlović 11; Asts: Bulajić 9

Sala Sporturilor Mioveni
Attendance: 92
Referees: Michail Papaioannou (SUI), Dimitar Georgiev (BUL), László Goda (HUN)

=== 5th place match ===
3 August 2025
13:00

Boxscore

Hungary	82–85	Montenegro
Scoring by quarter: 15–21, 20–22, 28–13, 19–29
Pts: Lukacsi 20; Rebs: three players 5 Asts: Flasar 6		Pts: Krnić 28; Rebs: Gulić 7 Asts: Komnenović, Krnić 4

Pitești Arena
Attendance: 92
Referees: Emmouil Tsolakos (GRE), Amalia Marchiş (ROU), Michal Kuzia (POL)

=== Semifinals ===
2 August 2025
18:00

Boxscore

Romania	47–71	Estonia
Scoring by quarter: 10–18, 17–10, 9–15, 11–28
Pts: Horga, Dubuc 9 Rebs: Horga 7 Asts: Horga, Dinu 3		Pts: Tomann 24; Rebs: Pertel 10; Asts: Kullamäe 8

Pitești Arena
Attendance: 2,136
Referees: Zdravko Rutesić (MNE), Ioannis Tiganis (GRE), Alexander Egil Reiertsen (NOR)

2 August 2025
20:30

Boxscore

Denmark	70–57	Slovakia
Scoring by quarter: 25–13, 17–10, 13–20, 15–14
Pts: Norgaard 21; Rebs: Katholm 9 Asts: Dalgaard-Duus 5		Pts: Randuška 17; Rebs: Golian 10; Asts: Randuška 4

Pitești Arena
Attendance: 137
Referees: Michail Papaioannou (SUI), Emmouil Tsolakos (GRE), Danilo Petković (SRB)

=== 3rd place match ===
3 August 2025
18:00

Boxscore

Slovakia	85–52	Romania
Scoring by quarter: 16–15, 25–13, 25–14, 19–10
Pts: Stanko 18; Rebs: Stanko 11; Asts: Minarovjech 7		Pts: Rasoga 19; Rebs: Horga 5 Asts: Dinu 2

Pitești Arena
Attendance: 2,176
Referees: Zdravko Rutesić (MNE), Elvis Binders-Coders (LAT), Ivo Kitsing (EST)

=== Final ===
3 August 2025
20:30

Boxscore

Denmark	83–77	Estonia
Scoring by quarter: 21–17, 28–14, 17–26, 17–20
Pts: Norgaard 30; Rebs: Katholm 6 Asts: Dada 5		Pts: Tomann 30; Rebs: Tomann 9 Asts: Kullamäe 8

Pitești Arena
Attendance: 1,400
Referees: Marius Ciulin (ROU), Henri Hilke (FIN), Michal Scholze (CZE)

== Final standings ==
Rank	Team	Record
1st place, gold medalist(s)	Denmark	7–1
2nd place, silver medalist(s)	Estonia	7–1
3rd place, bronze medalist(s)	Slovakia	5–2
4	Romania	5–3
5	Montenegro	5–2
6	Hungary	5–3
7	Bosnia and Herzegovina	4–3
8	Poland	4–3
9	Netherlands	4–3
10	Croatia	5–2
11	Portugal	6–2
12	Georgia	3–5
13	Czechia	4–4
14	Switzerland	4–4
15	Iceland	2–5
16	Great Britain	2–5
17	Ukraine	3–4
18	Finland	2–5
19	Norway	2–5
20	Ireland	1–6
21	Azerbaijan	1–6
22	Kosovo	0–7

Promoted to the 2026 FIBA U18 EuroBasket Division A
Relegated to the 2026 FIBA U18 EuroBasket Division C

== Statistics and awards ==
=== Statistical leaders ===
==== Players ====
Points

Name	PPG
(Kosovo) Besim Bytyqi	22.1
(Switzerland) Klark Riethauser	21.7
(Hungary) Gábor Lukácsi	18.9
(Croatia) Borna Katanović	18.4
(Denmark) Noah Nørgaard	18.3

Blocks

Name	BPG
(Slovakia) Maroš Golian	2.2
(United Kingdom) Ike Davids	2
(Estonia) Roman Avdejev	2
(Azerbaijan) Ifeanyichukwu Agbason	1.9
(Netherlands) Endurance Aiyamenkhue	1.9

Rebounds

Name	RPG
(Bosnia and Herzegovina) Novak Manojlović	13.3
(Netherlands) Endurance Aiyamenkhue	12.7
(Portugal) João Panzo	11.4
(Kosovo) Mal Tusuni	11.3
(Kosovo) Drin Mehmed Tafilaj	10.1

Steals

Name	SPG
(Croatia) Borna Katanović	4.4
(Iceland) Atli Hjartarson	3.9
(Portugal) Apolo Caetano	3.5
(Kosovo) Besim Bytyqi	3.3
(Denmark) Jamie Dada	2.8

Assists

Name	APG
(Estonia) Oliver Kullamäe	7.6
(Hungary) Zalán Flasár	6
(Georgia (country)) Mate Khatiashvili	6
(Poland) Jakub Galewski	5.7
(Kosovo) Besim Bytyqi	5.7

Efficiency

Name	EFFPG
(Bosnia and Herzegovina) Novak Manojlović	26.4
(Switzerland) Klark Riethauser	23
(Georgia (country)) Giorgi Tchirakadze	21.8
(Croatia) Borna Katanović	21.7
(Kosovo) Besim Bytyqi	20.7

==== Teams ====
Points

Name	PPG
Poland	85.7
Hungary	83.0
Denmark	81.9
Iceland	81.9
Croatia	81.7

Blocks

Name	BPG
Great Britain	5.4
Montenegro	4.9
Slovakia	4.9
Bosnia and Herzegovina	4.1
Denmark	4.1

Rebounds

Name	RPG
Netherlands	51.9
Slovakia	48.4
Azerbaijan	47.1
Kosovo	44.9
Estonia	44.8

Steals

Name	SPG
Croatia	14.3
Denmark	13.4
Portugal	13.3
Poland	12.1
Iceland	11.3

Assists

Name	APG
Hungary	20.4
Estonia	18.6
Poland	17.6
Switzerland	17.3
Bosnia and Herzegovina	17.1

Efficiency

Name	EFFPG
Hungary	96.1
Estonia	92.5
Denmark	91.9
Montenegro	90.7
Croatia	90.6

=== Awards ===
The awards were announced on 3 August 2025.

Award	Player
All-Tournament Team	(Denmark) Noah Nørgaard
All-Tournament Team	(Denmark) Joost Dalgaard-Duus
All-Tournament Team	(Estonia) Kaur Tomann
All-Tournament Team	(Slovakia) Maroš Golian
All-Tournament Team	(Romania) David-Ioan Rasoga
Most Valuable Player	(Denmark) Noah Nørgaard
