= Great Britain men's national under-18 basketball team =

Great Britain
- FIBA zone: FIBA Europe
- National federation: British Basketball

U19 World Cup
- Appearances: None

U18 EuroBasket
- Appearances: 3
- Medals: None

U18 EuroBasket Division B
- Appearances: 5
- Medals: Silver: 1 (2017)
| Home | Away |

The Great Britain men's national under-18 basketball team is a national basketball team of Great Britain, administered by British Basketball. It represents the country in international under-18 men's basketball competitions.

== FIBA U18 EuroBasket participations ==
| Year | Division A | Division B |
|---|---|---|
| 2017 | | 2nd place, silver medalist(s) |
| 2018 | 7th | |
| 2019 | 8th | |
| 2022 | 15th | |
| 2023 | | 5th |
| 2024 | | 19th |
| 2025 | | 16th |
| 2026 | | 13th |

== See also ==
- Great Britain men's national basketball team
- Great Britain men's national under-16 basketball team
- Great Britain women's national under-18 basketball team
