= Motiejus Krivas =

Lithuanian basketball player (born 2004)

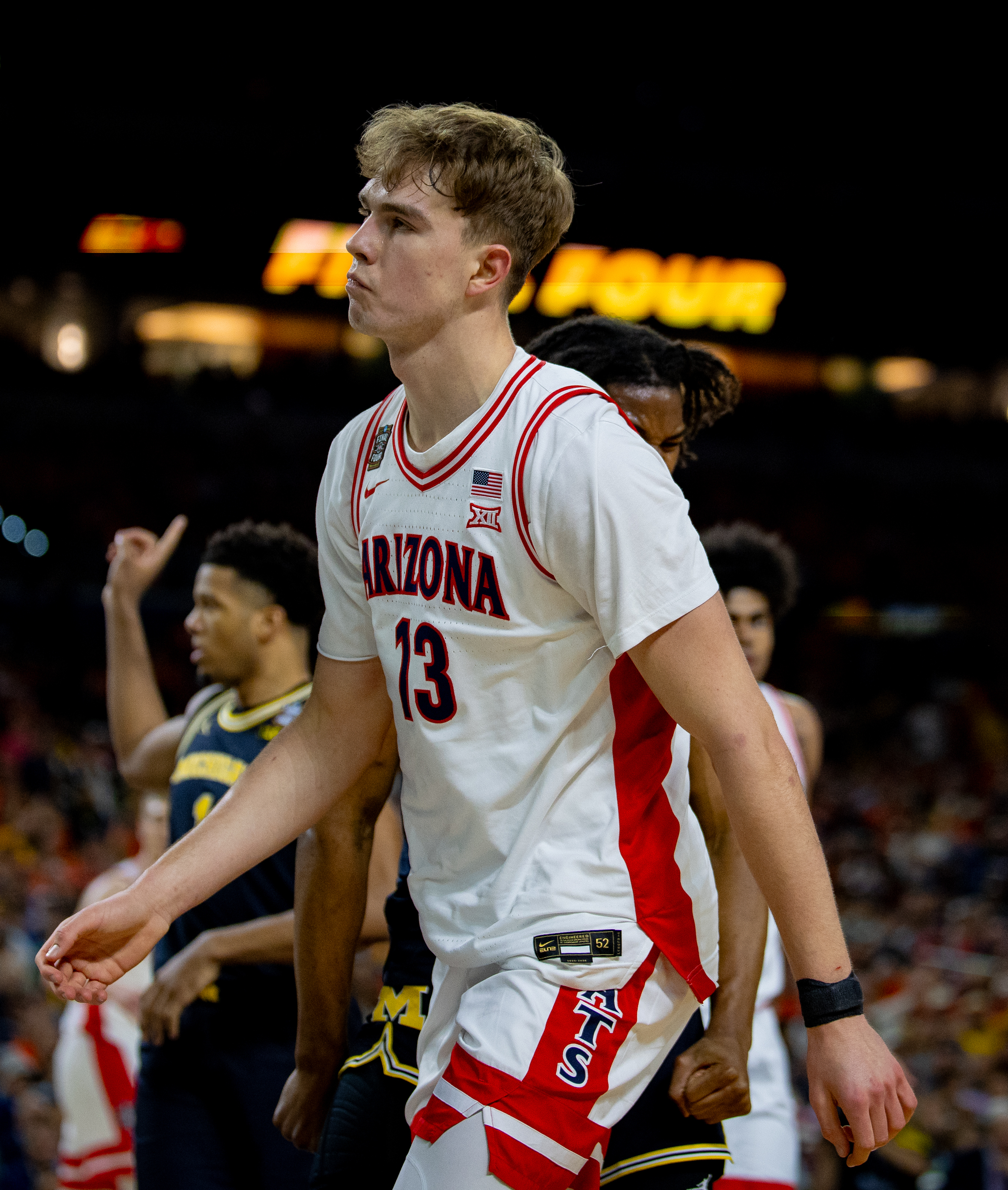
- Krivas with the Arizona Wildcats in 2026

No. 13 – Arizona Wildcats
- Position: Center
- League: Big 12 Conference

Personal information
- Born: December 1, 2004 (age 21) Šiauliai, Lithuania
- Listed height: 7 ft 2 in (2.18 m)
- Listed weight: 260 lb (118 kg)

Career information
- College: Arizona (2023–present)
- Playing career: 2019–present

Career history
- 2019–2023: Žalgiris Kaunas
- 2019–2023: →BC Žalgiris-2

Career highlights
- First-team All-Big 12 (2026); Big 12 All-Defensive Team (2026)

Motiejus Krivas (born December 1, 2004) is a Lithuanian college basketball player for the Arizona Wildcats of the Big 12 Conference.

== Early life and career ==
Krivas was born and grew up in Šiauliai, Lithuania. He began playing for BC Žalgiris-2 of the National Basketball League (NKL) in 2019. Krivas averaged 13.7 points, 9.8 rebounds, 1.6 blocks, and 1.5 assists during the 2022–23 season and was named the NKL's best defender. He also played for the senior team, Žalgiris Kaunas, in Lithuanian Basketball League and EuroLeague games. Moreover, he played for the Boston Celtics in five games during the 2023 Basketball Without Borders young players program.

== College career ==
=== Freshman season ===
Krivas committed to play college basketball in the United States for the Arizona Wildcats. He averaged 5.4 points and 4.2 rebounds per game as a freshman while primarily serving as the backup to Oumar Ballo.

=== Sophomore season ===
Krivas entered his sophomore season as the Wildcats' starting center following Ballo's transfer to Indiana. Nevertheless, he played in just first eight games of the season before suffering a season-ending foot injury. His averages were 7.9 points, 4.5 rebounds and 1.1 assists per game. While playing without Krivas the Wildcats in the 2025 NCAA Division I men's basketball tournament reached the Sweet Sixteen round, however in it they were eliminated 93–100 by the first-seeded Duke Blue Devils that were led by Cooper Flagg.

=== Junior season ===
He has been a game changer for us defensively. I feel good when he is on the court. He has great instincts, mobility at 7'2 and he does a great job contesting shots up high, and getting short rebounds that come off the basket – those are really hard to get when you are up vertically contesting a shot.

— Tommy Lloyd, Arizona head coach about Krivas importance for the team defensively.

Krivas entered his third season with the Wildcats being projected as one of the primary players of the team and appeared in the starting five in all 31 games of the NCAA regular season during which he averaged 10.8 points, 8.2 rebounds, one assist, 0.7 steals and 1.8 blocks. He has significantly contributed to his team winning the Big 12 Conference and was selected to the First Team and All-Defensive Team of the Big 12 Conference. The Wildcats also became champions of the 2026 Big 12 men's basketball tournament where they defeated UCF Knights, Iowa State Cyclones, Houston Cougars and during it Krivas was Wildcats starting five center averaging 7.3 points, 6.6 rebounds, 1.6 blocks per game. The Wildcats earned the No. 1 seed in the West region for the 2026 NCAA Division I men's basketball tournament.

Krivas in the first round of the NCAA Tournament contributed nine points, eight rebounds, two assists, and four blocks to a Wildcats crushing victory 92–58 versus the 16th-seeded LIU Sharks, which was the largest margin victory in an NCAA Tournament since 1998. In the second-round game versus the 9th-seeded Utah State Aggies Krivas recorded 11 points, 14 rebounds (nine offensive, just one rebound off from his NCAA career-high 15 rebounds), two assists, and three blocks, while the Wildcats won 78–66. In the Sweet Sixteen round Krivas contributed 14 points, five rebounds, two assists, and two blocks to a Wildcats yet another crushing victory 109–88 versus the 4th-seeded Arkansas Razorbacks. The Wildcats won the 2026 NCAA Tournament West Regional Final by 79–64 defeating the 2nd-seeded Purdue Boilermakers, while Krivas contributed to the victory six points, game-high 12 rebounds (five offensive), three assists, one block, and the Wildcats advanced to the NCAA Tournament Final Four after a 25 years hiatus. The overall successful season ended in the National Semifinal of the Final Four where the Wildcats were defeated 73–91 by the eventual champions Michigan Wolverines and Krivas (11 points, six rebounds, two steals, one assist and block) was overshadowed by Aday Mara (26 points, nine rebounds, three assists, two blocks).

=== Senior season ===
In April 2026, Krivas decided to stay in the University of Arizona for a senior season and not to participate in the 2026 NBA Draft. On November 6, 2026, Krivas scored a NCAA career high 30 points to lead the Wildcats to a 104–84 victory versus the Cal Poly Mustangs.

== National team career ==
Krivas has played for the Lithuania men's national under-18 and under-19 basketball teams and the under-20 team. His best performance statistically in the FIBA's youth tournaments was in the 2022 FIBA U18 European Championship where among his peers he averaged 13.6 points, 13.4 rebounds, 1.7 assists, 1.7 blocks per game (his efficiency points average per game was 22.3), however in the playoffs Lithuania was eliminated 64–61 in the quarterfinal by hosts and upcoming finalists Turkey.

== Player profile ==
Krivas is noted for his capabilities in interior defense and post scoring. Due to his height and playing style he received a nickname "Mount Krivas".
