= N. U. Prabhu =

Indian-American mathematician (1924–2022)

- Born: Narahari Umanath Prabhu; April 25, 1924
- Died: October 14, 2022 (aged 98)
- Education: University of Madras; University of Bombay; University of Manchester
- Known for: Queueing theory
- Awards: INFORMS Applied Probability Award of Honor (1997)
- Scientific career
- Fields: Operations research Queueing theory
- Workplaces: Cornell University
- Doctoral students: Haya Kaspi; Vidyadhar G. Kulkarni; António Pacheco

Narahari Umanath Prabhu (25 April 1924 – 14 October 2022) was an Indian-American mathematician, known for his contributions to operation research, in particular queueing theory. Although he did not seek a Ph.D., he guided a number of Ph.Ds.

== Career ==
Prabhu, who was from Mangalore and Kozhikode got a B.A. in mathematics from University of Madras (1946), a M.A. in statistics from University of Bombay (1950). Prabhu was the founding head of the department of statistics, Karnatak University, Dharwar in 1951. He obtained a M.Sc. in mathematics from University of Manchester on a thesis entitled Solution to Some Dam Problems (1957).

Prabhu lectured at Gauhati University (1950–1952), Karnatak University (1952–1961), University of Western Australia (1961–1964), before becoming associate professor at University of Michigan (1964–1965) and Cornell University (1965–1994) where he became professor (1967) and emeritus (1994). Prabhu also had longer research stays at Indian Statistical Institute in Calcutta (1961), University of Wisconsin–Madison (1970, 1973), Technion in Haifa (1973), University of Melbourne (1978), University of Maryland, College Park (1979), and Uppsala University (1984).

Prabhu was the founding editor of the journal Queueing Systems (1986–1994) and has edited several other journals, as well as published books on Foundations of Queueing Theory (Springer Verlag, 1997) and Stochastic storage processes (Springer, 1998).

The South Asia Program at Cornell created the Rabindranath Tagore Endowment in Modern Indian Literature, made possible through a gift by Professor Emeritus Narahari Umanath Prabhu and his wife, Suman Prabhu..

Prabhu died on 14 October 2022, at the age of 98.

== Awards ==
- INFORMS (Applied Probability) Award of Honor (1997)
- Honorary fellow of the Indian statistical association (1998)
