= Klark Riethauser =

Swiss basketball player (born 2008)

No. 10 – Élan Chalon
- Position: Small forward
- League: LNB Élite

Personal information
- Born: 29 March 2008 (age 18) Geneva, Switzerland
- Listed height: 2.03 m (6 ft 8 in)
- Listed weight: 91 kg (201 lb)

Career information
- Playing career: 2025–present

Career history
- 2025–present: Élan Chalon

Career highlights
- LNB Young Star Game (2026)

Klark-Luca Maxwell Riethauser (born 29 March 2008) is a Swiss professional basketball player for Élan Chalon of the LNB Élite.

== Early life and youth career ==
Riethauser was born on 29 March 2008 in Geneva, Switzerland. He tried a variety of sports growing up, though he focused on tennis for several years, even winning the Swiss under-10 national championship. Riethauser switched to basketball at age 11, joining Veyrier Salève Basket Club. He quickly excelled in the Swiss youth system. In 2023, Riethauser joined the youth academy of French club Élan Chalon. He starred on the U18 and U21 teams, helping the former win an Espoirs Pro B national title. On 11 April 2026, Riethauser scored a career-high 37 points in a U21 Espoirs Élite game against Boulazac Basket Dordogne. He was named to the 2025–26 Espoirs Élite All-Star Five after averaging 18.6 points and seven rebounds in 26 games played.

Riethauser was invited to the 2025 Basketball Without Borders (BWB) Europe camp in Manchester, but did not attend due to injury. The following year, he participated in the 2026 BWB Global camp in Los Angeles during NBA All-Star Weekend, and took college recruiting visits to Nebraska, Texas, and USC. That summer, Riethauser earned all-tournament honors at the 2025–26 EuroLeague NextGen Belgrade Qualifier after averaging 16.3 points and 5.5 rebounds per game for Next Gen Team Belgrade.

== Professional career ==
Riethauser was first called up to the Élan Chalon senior team during the 2025–26 preseason, debuting in an exhibition match against the Lions de Genève in August 2025. He made his competitive debut in the LNB Élite the following month, coming off the bench during the final seconds of a loss to Paris Basketball on 26 October. Riethauser appeared in two additional league games that season, albeit in limited minutes. He also made one appearance in the French Cup, scoring six points in a win over Tours Métropole Basket in the round of 16. Riethauser was named to the 2026 LNB Young Star Game, where he scored 10 points and grabbed seven rebounds. He also finished as the runner-up in the three-point contest held at halftime.

Despite interest from larger European clubs and National Collegiate Athletic Association (NCAA) programs like BYU, it was announced on 2 June 2026 that Riethauser had signed his first professional contract with Élan Chalon.

== National team career ==
Riethauser represented Switzerland at the 2023 FIBA U16 European Championship Division B. He played a limited role, averaging one point and three rebounds per game. Two years later, Riethauser represented Switzerland at the 2025 FIBA Under-19 Basketball World Cup. He averaged 3.5 points and 3.3 rebounds per game, helping Switzerland to an eighth-place finish on home soil. Later that summer, Riethauser played again at the 2025 FIBA U18 EuroBasket Division B. He averaged 21.7 points, 7.4 rebounds, and 2.7 assists per game.

== Personal life ==
A native of Geneva, Riethauser speaks French as his first language. His father, also from Geneva, played professional basketball in Switzerland, while his mother is a native of Cameroon.
