= Nathalie Eisenbaum =

French mathematician, statistician

Nathalie Eisenbaum is a French mathematician, statistician, and probability theorist. She works as a director of research with the Centre national de la recherche scientifique, associated with the laboratory for applied mathematics at Paris Descartes University and was previously a researcher in the Laboratoire de Probabilités, Statistique et Modélisation (laboratory for probability, statistics, and modeling) at Pierre and Marie Curie University.

Eisenbaum completed her doctorate at Pierre and Marie Curie University in 1989. Her dissertation, Temps locaux, excursions et lieu le plus visité par un mouvement brownien linéaire, was supervised by Marc Yor.

She is a Fellow of the Institute of Mathematical Statistics. In 2011, Eisenbaum and Haya Kaspi shared the Itô Prize of the Bernoulli Society for Mathematical Statistics and Probability for their joint work on permanental point processes (processes whose joint intensity can be represented as a permanent).
