= Novak Manojlović =

Bosnia and Herzegovina basketball player (born 2007)

No. 14 – Bosna
- Position: Center
- League: Bosnian League; ABA League

Personal information
- Born: October 1, 2007 (age 19) Bijeljina, Bosnia and Herzegovina
- Listed height: 205 cm (6 ft 9 in)

Career information
- Playing career: 2024–present

Career history
- 2024–present: Bosna

Novak Manojlović (Serbian Cyrillic: Новак Манојловић; born 1 October 2007) is a Bosnian professional basketball player who plays as a center for KK Bosna BH Telecom in the ABA League and the Bosnian League. Known for his size, rebounding ability, and performance at international youth competitions, Manojlović is considered one of the most promising young basketball talents in Bosnia and Herzegovina.

== Early life ==
Novak Manojlović was born on 1 October 2007 in Bijeljina, Bosnia and Herzegovina. He began his youth basketball career with the local club Budućnost Bijeljina before attracting attention as a standout junior prospect.

== Club career ==
=== KK Bosna BH Telecom ===
In July 2024, Manojlović signed with KK Bosna BH Telecom and joined the club's developmental and under-19 teams, marking his move to Sarajevo and entry into top-tier youth competition.

On 9 October 2025, he signed his first professional contract with Bosna and began seeing playing time with the senior team. During this period he also scored his first official points in a FIBA Europe Cup match on his 18th birthday.

== International career ==
=== Youth national teams ===
Manojlović has represented Bosnia and Herzegovina at youth international tournaments. At the 2025 FIBA U18 EuroBasket Division B, he averaged 17.6 points and 13.3 rebounds per game, ranking among the competition's statistical leaders.

He was also previously part of the Bosnia and Herzegovina squad at the 2024 FIBA U16 EuroBasket Division B.

=== Senior national team consideration ===
In November 2025, Manojlović was named to the wider squad for the Bosnia and Herzegovina senior national team by the new head coach Dario Gjergja, signifying recognition of his potential for future senior international play.

== Playing style ==
Standing 205 cm tall and playing as a center, Manojlović combines physical presence with rebounding skill, defensive awareness, and scoring ability in the paint. His performances in youth international competition have earned praise for both his efficiency and consistency on both ends of the court.
