= Haya Kaspi =

Israeli operations researcher and statistician

- חיה כספי
- Born: October 6, 1948 (age 77); Kibbutz HaOgen
- Education: Hebrew University of Jerusalem, Technion – Israel Institute of Technology, Cornell University
- Known for: Markov processes, Markov local time, permanental point processes
- Awards: Fellow of the Institute of Mathematical Statistics (2008), Itô Prize (2011)
- Scientific career
- Fields: Operations Research, Statistics, Probability Theory
- Workplaces: Technion – Israel Institute of Technology
- Doctoral advisor: N. U. Prabhu

Haya Kaspi (Hebrew: חיה כספי; born 6 October 1948) is an Israeli operations researcher, statistician, and probability theorist. She is a professor emeritus of industrial engineering and management at the Technion – Israel Institute of Technology.

== Education and career ==
Kaspi was born in HaOgen. She earned a bachelor's degree in mathematics at the Hebrew University of Jerusalem in 1971, and a master's degree in applied mathematics at the Technion – Israel Institute of Technology in 1974. Next, she went to the US for her doctoral studies, completing a Ph.D. in operations research at Cornell University in 1979. Her dissertation, Ladder Sets of Markov Additive Processes, was supervised by N. U. Prabhu.

After postdoctoral study at Princeton University, she returned to the Technion in 1980 as a lecturer. She was promoted to full professor in 1997.

== Recognition ==
In 2008, Kaspi was selected as a Fellow of the Institute of Mathematical Statistics "for contributions to the general theory of Markov processes and its applications, to the theory of Markov local time; and for excellence in teaching and editorial work". In 2011, Kaspi and Nathalie Eisenbaum shared the Itô Prize of the Bernoulli Society for Mathematical Statistics and Probability for their joint work on permanental point processes (processes whose joint intensity can be represented as a permanent).
