= Radhika Kulkarni =

Indian-American operations researcher

- Born: Radhika Devarajan; March 24, 1956 (age 70); Bangalore
- Education: Indian Institute of Technology Delhi (M.Sc.); Cornell University (M.S., Ph.D.)
- Known for: Bechhofer–Kulkarni selection procedure
- Awards: INFORMS Fellow (2014); WORMS Award for the Advancement of Women in OR/MS (2006)
- Scientific career
- Fields: Operations research
- Institutions: SAS Institute
- Thesis: An Investigation of Procedures for Sequential Ranking and Selection of Bernoulli Populations (1981)
- Doctoral advisor: Robert E. Bechhofer

Radhika Vidyadhar Kulkarni (born 1956) is a retired Indian and American operations researcher, and the 2022 president of INFORMS.

The Bechhofer–Kulkarni selection procedure or Bechhofer–Kulkarni stopping rule, a stopping rule for maximization in Bernoulli processes, is named after her work with her doctoral advisor, Robert E. Bechhofer.

== Education and career ==
After earning a master's degree in mathematics at IIT Delhi, Kulkarni went to Cornell University intending to do doctoral research in pure mathematics, but switched to operations research after taking a mathematical programming course in her first year. She earned a second master's degree in 1979 and completed her Ph.D. in 1981 under advisor Robert E. Bechhofer.

She worked for 35 years at the SAS Institute, including ten years as Vice President of Advanced Analytics R&D. She is the 2022 president of the Institute for Operations Research and the Management Sciences (INFORMS).

== Recognition ==
- Kulkarni was the 2006 winner of the WORMS Award for the Advancement of Women in OR/MS of INFORMS.
- In 2014 she was named a Fellow of INFORMS.

== Personal life ==
Radhika came to Cornell in 1977 to pursue a PhD in mathematics, but in fall 1978, she switched to Operations Research to work with Professor Robert Bechhofer. She came to Cornell because Cornell was the only university that agreed to waive the $20 application fee until she arrived. Even after switching from math to OR, Math funded her second year.

At Cornell, she met Vidyadhar G. Kulkarni, whom she later married. Interestingly, he, too, came to Cornell because Cornell was the only university to offer a temporary waiver of the $20 application fee. They have three sons, all of whom graduated from Cornell.
