= 2022 FIBA U18 European Championship =

International basketball competition

Tournament details
- Host country: Turkey
- City: İzmir
- Dates: 30 July – 7 August 2022
- Teams: 16 (from 1 confederation)
- Venue(s): 2 (in 1 host city)

Final positions
- Champions: Spain (5th title)
- Runners-up: Turkey
- Third place: Serbia

Tournament statistics
- MVP: (Spain) Izan Almansa
- Top scorer: (Lithuania) Paulius Murauskas (20.7 ppg)
- Top rebounds: (Lithuania) Motiejus Krivas (13.4 rpg)
- Top assists: (Israel) Noam Yaacov (6.0 apg)

Official website
- www.fiba.basketball

The 2022 FIBA U18 European Championship was the 37th edition of the European basketball championship for national under-18 teams. It was played from 30 July to 7 August 2022 in İzmir, Turkey. Spain men's national under-18 basketball team won the tournament and became the European champions for the fifth time.

== Participating teams ==
- Croatia
- Czech Republic ▲ (Third place, 2019 FIBA U18 European Championship Division B)
- France
- Germany
- Great Britain
- Greece
- Israel ▲ (Winners, 2019 FIBA U18 European Championship Division B)
- Italy
- Lithuania
- Montenegro
- North Macedonia ▲ (Fourth place, 2019 FIBA U18 European Championship Division B)
- Poland ▲ (Runners-up, 2019 FIBA U18 European Championship Division B)
- Serbia
- Slovenia
- Spain
- Turkey

== First round ==
The draw of the first round was held on 15 February 2022 in Freising, Germany.

In the first round, the teams were drawn into four groups of four. All teams advance to the playoffs.

=== Group A ===
Pos	Team	Pld	W	L	PF	PA	PD	Pts
1	France	3	3	0	283	158	+125	6
2	Israel	3	2	1	234	213	+21	5
3	Great Britain	3	1	2	177	255	−78	4
4	North Macedonia	3	0	3	186	254	−68	3

Source: FIBA

30 July 2022	France	97–45	Great Britain	Karşıyaka Arena, İzmir
12:45	Scoring by quarter: 19-15, 34-12, 26-4, 18-14
	Pts: Doualla 13; Rebs: Perrin 10; Asts: Houinsou 6	Boxscore	Pts: Davis 10; Rebs: Campbell 5 Asts: four players 2	Referees: Petros Papapetrou (GRE), Vilius Maciulaitis (LTU), Alessandro Perciavalle (ITA)

30 July 2022	Israel	79–70	North Macedonia	Karşıyaka Arena, İzmir
15:00	Scoring by quarter: 15-18, 27-18, 16-17, 21-17
	Pts: Yaacov 24; Rebs: Nekrashevich 6 Asts: Yaacov 7	Boxscore	Pts: Simikj 25; Rebs: Simikj 12; Asts: Dimitrievski 6	Referees: Ivor Matejek (CZE), Beniamino Manuel Attard (ITA), Balazs Meszaros (HUN)

31 July 2022	North Macedonia	47–104	France	Bornova Belediyesi Atatürk Sport Complex, İzmir
12:45	Scoring by quarter: 15-39, 6-25, 8-25, 18-15
	Pts: Bashoski 12; Rebs: Saiti 4 Asts: Shoshkikj Dimitrievski 3	Boxscore	Pts: Coulibaly 19; Rebs: Cissoko, Diakeno 6 Asts: Parmentelot, Houinsou 7	Referees: Radomir Vojinovic (MNE), Vilius Maciulaitis (LTU), Primož Pipan (SLO)

31 July 2022	Great Britain	61–89	Israel	Bornova Belediyesi Atatürk Sport Complex, İzmir
15:00	Scoring by quarter: 16-24, 12-30, 11-20, 22-15
	Pts: Davis 15; Rebs: Campbell 11; Asts: Walters 5	Boxscore	Pts: Yaacov 18; Rebs: Menachem 6 Asts: Lempert 5	Referees: Petros Papapetrou (GRE), Gintaras Maciulis, Gintaras (LTU), Alessandro Perciavalle (ITA)

1 August 2022	North Macedonia	69–71	Great Britain	Bornova Belediyesi Atatürk Sport Complex, İzmir
12:45	Scoring by quarter: 17-16, 16-20, 16-14, 20-21
	Pts: Simikj 19; Rebs: Simikj 13; Asts: Dimitrievski 7	Boxscore	Pts: Campbell 19; Rebs: Davis 11; Asts: Brown 6	Referees: Martin Vulic (CRO), Gintaras Maciulis (LTU), Anastasios Kardaris (GRE)

1 August 2022	France	82–66	Israel	Bornova Belediyesi Atatürk Sport Complex, İzmir
17:15	Scoring by quarter: 17-12, 30-15, 23-16, 12-23
	Pts: Perrin 20; Rebs: Perrin 8 Asts: Cissoko 5	Boxscore	Pts: Avidan 14; Rebs: four players 3 Asts: Yaacov 7	Referees: Ventsislav Velikov (BUL), Beniamino Manuel Attard (ITA), Primož Pipan (SLO)

=== Group B ===
Pos	Team	Pld	W	L	PF	PA	PD	Pts
1	Spain	3	3	0	223	149	+74	6
2	Turkey	3	2	1	218	171	+47	5
3	Poland	3	1	2	155	220	−65	4
4	Germany	3	0	3	164	220	−56	3

Source: FIBA

30 July 2022	Spain	89–44	Germany	Karşıyaka Arena, İzmir
18:15	Scoring by quarter: 24–8, 23–10, 20–9, 22–17
	Pts: Almansa 17; Rebs: Almansa 13; Asts: Villar 5	Boxscore	Pts: Ndi 8 Rebs: Schulte 7 Asts: Rapieque 3	Referees: Martin Vulic (CRO), Gintaras Maciulis (LTU), Primož Pipan (SLO)

30 July 2022	Poland	43–94	Turkey	Karşıyaka Arena, İzmir
20:30	Scoring by quarter: 15–22, 12–20, 8–23, 8–29
	Pts: Wrzeszcz 12; Rebs: Kempa 6 Asts: Wilczek 2	Boxscore	Pts: Buyukcangaz 18; Rebs: Yigitoglu 8 Asts: Cengiz 6	Referees: Radomir Vojinovic (MNE), Sinisa Prpa (SRB), Anastasios Kardaris (GRE)

31 July 2022	Germany	56–63	Poland	Bornova Belediyesi Atatürk Sport Complex, İzmir
18:15	Scoring by quarter: 15–16, 19–14, 7–15, 15–18
	Pts: Kalu, Brockhoff 16; Rebs: Brockhoff 10; Asts: Wulff 4	Boxscore	Pts: Wrzeszcz 17; Rebs: Wilczek 11; Asts: Wrzeszcz 5	Referees: Ivor Matejek (CZE), Sinisa Prpa (SRB), Anastasios Kardaris (GRE)

31 July 2022	Turkey	56–64	Spain	Karşıyaka Arena, İzmir
20:30	Scoring by quarter: 1–13, 23–14, 14–20, 18–17
	Pts: Buyuktuncel 20; Rebs: Yigitoglu 13; Asts: Sivas 4	Boxscore	Pts: Rodriguez 17; Rebs: Almansa 10; Asts: Rodriguez 7	Referees: Martin Vulic (CRO), Beniamino Manuel Attard (ITA), Ventsislav Velikov (BUL)

1 August 2022	Turkey	68–64	Germany	Karşıyaka Arena, İzmir
20:30	Scoring by quarter: 14–21, 25–18, 12–20, 17–5
	Pts: Konan 21; Rebs: Konan, Yildizoglu 9 Asts: Yildizoglu 8	Boxscore	Pts: Brockhoff 16; Rebs: Rapieque 10; Asts: Machowski, Onyejiaka 3	Referees: Radomir Vojinovic (MNE), Ivor Matejek (CZE), Alessandro Perciavalle (ITA)

1 August 2022	Spain	70–49	Poland	Bornova Belediyesi Atatürk Sport Complex, İzmir
20:30	Scoring by quarter: 9–5, 22–14, 20–9, 19–21
	Pts: Almansa 13; Rebs: Garcia, Onuetu 7 Asts: Rodriguez 7	Boxscore	Pts: Wilczek 12; Rebs: Wilczek, Duda 4 Asts: Andrzejewski 4	Referees: Petros Papapetrou (GRE), Sinisa Prpa (SRB), Vilius Maciulaitis (LTU)

=== Group C ===
Pos	Team	Pld	W	L	PF	PA	PD	Pts
1	Serbia	3	3	0	229	180	+49	6
2	Slovenia	3	2	1	193	189	+4	5
3	Greece	3	1	2	191	206	−15	4
4	Czech Republic	3	0	3	179	217	−38	3

Source: FIBA

30 July 2022	Serbia	70–52	Slovenia	Bornova Belediyesi Atatürk Sport Complex, İzmir
13:45	Scoring by quarter: 16–12, 16–14, 23–6, 15–20
	Pts: Radaković 21; Rebs: Ristić 11; Asts: Čovičković 4	Boxscore	Pts: Samar 17; Rebs: Kocevar 6 Asts: Zemljic 5	Referees: Thomas Bissuel (FRA), Kerem Baki (TUR), Alberto Baena Arroyo (ESP)

30 July 2022	Czech Republic	56–67	Greece	Bornova Belediyesi Atatürk Sport Complex, İzmir
16:00	Scoring by quarter: 13–22, 18–13, 13–18, 12–14
	Pts: Olbort 24; Rebs: Nečas 6 Asts: Navratil, Lukes 3	Boxscore	Pts: Samodurov 20; Rebs: Samodurov 13; Asts: Korkontzelos 4	Referees: Michal Proc (POL), Nir Meirson (ISR), Armin Mutapcic (GER)

31 July 2022	Slovenia	68–58	Czech Republic	Karşıyaka Arena, İzmir
13:45
	Pts: Zemljic 12; Rebs: Osojnik 11; Asts: Zemljic 5	Boxscore	Pts: Svoboda 11; Rebs: Nečas 9 Asts: Nečas 5	Referees: Igor Mitrovski (MKD), Lukasz Jankowski (POL), Balazs Meszaros (HUN)

31 July 2022	Greece	63–77	Serbia	Bornova Belediyesi Atatürk Sport Complex, İzmir
20:30	Scoring by quarter: 16–21, 15–17, 16–17, 16–22
	Pts: Samodurov, Kalatzis 12; Rebs: three players 5 Asts: Bilalis 6	Boxscore	Pts: Ćurčić 18; Rebs: Milenković 11; Asts: Ćurčić, Milijašević 3	Referees: Luis Castillo (ESP), Kerem Baki (TUR), Iain Macdonald (GBR)

1 August 2022	Greece	61–73	Slovenia	Karşıyaka Arena, İzmir
16:00	Scoring by quarter: 6–16, 19–26, 18–15, 18–16
	Pts: Zougris 20; Rebs: Zougris 7 Asts: Sprintzios 4	Boxscore	Pts: Zulic 19; Rebs: Osojnik 8 Asts: Zemljic, Samar 5	Referees: Michal Proc (POL), Javier Torres Sanchez (ESP), Armin Mutapcic (GER)

1 August 2022	Serbia	82–65	Czech Republic	Karşıyaka Arena, İzmir
18:15	Scoring by quarter: 31–13, 17–19, 15–12, 19–21
	Pts: three players 15; Rebs: Šarenac 6 Asts: M. Milošević 4	Boxscore	Pts: Svoboda 13; Rebs: Nečas 11; Asts: Nečas 5	Referees: Thomas Bissuel (FRA), Igor Mitrovski (MKD), Alberto Baena Arroyo (ESP)

=== Group D ===
Pos	Team	Pld	W	L	PF	PA	PD	Pts
1	Lithuania	3	3	0	237	171	+66	6
2	Italy	3	2	1	210	184	+26	5
3	Croatia	3	1	2	185	212	−27	4
4	Montenegro	3	0	3	153	218	−65	3

Source: FIBA

30 July 2022	Lithuania	75–56	Montenegro	Bornova Belediyesi Atatürk Sport Complex, İzmir
18:15	Scoring by quarter: 19–14, 19–17, 18–17, 19–8
	Pts: Murauskas 16; Rebs: Krivas 13; Asts: Murauskas 5	Boxscore	Pts: Jokovic 13; Rebs: Brajovic, Lekic 7 Asts: Jokovic 4	Referees: Luis Castillo (ESP), Lukasz Jankowski (POL), Iain Macdonald (GBR)

30 July 2022	Croatia	64–73	Italy	Bornova Belediyesi Atatürk Sport Complex, İzmir
20:30	Scoring by quarter: 12–18, 20–25, 20–14, 12–15
	Pts: Krajnovic 12; Rebs: Jelavic 9 Asts: Rajaofera 5	Boxscore	Pts: Gallo 15; Rebs: Innocenti 7 Asts: Moretti, Visintin 3	Referees: Ventsislav Velikov (BUL), Igor Mitrovski (MKD), Javier Torres Sanchez (ESP)

31 July 2022	Italy	61–79	Lithuania	Karşıyaka Arena, İzmir
16:00	Scoring by quarter: 19–15, 19–23, 9–18, 14–23
	Pts: Visintin 13; Rebs: Innocenti 6 Asts: Gallo 3	Boxscore	Pts: Krivas 17; Rebs: Krivas 15; Asts: Kublickas 9	Referees: Thomas Bissuel (FRA), Javier Torres Sanchez (ESP), Armin Mutapcic (GER)

31 July 2022	Montenegro	56–67	Croatia	Karşıyaka Arena, İzmir
18:15	Scoring by quarter: 17–14, 9–19, 15–14, 15–20
	Pts: Hot 13; Rebs: Brajovic 7 Asts: Hot 5	Boxscore	Pts: Jelavic 17; Rebs: Jelavic 12; Asts: Rajaofera 4	Referees: Michal Proc (POL), Nir Meirson (ISR), Alberto Baena Arroyo (ESP)

1 August 2022	Italy	76–41	Montenegro	Karşıyaka Arena, İzmir
13:45	Scoring by quarter: 18–8, 24–11, 14–6, 20–16
	Pts: Innocenti 12; Rebs: Cannavina 10; Asts: Gallo 6	Boxscore	Pts: Jokovic 10; Rebs: Boskovic 7 Asts: Hot 5	Referees: Luis Castillo (ESP), Iain Macdonald (GBR), Balazs Meszaros (HUN)

1 August 2022	Lithuania	83–54	Croatia	Bornova Belediyesi Atatürk Sport Complex, İzmir
16:00	Scoring by quarter: 22–17, 20–17, 24–13, 17–7
	Pts: Murauskas 16; Rebs: Krivas 14; Asts: Rimkus, Krivas 4	Boxscore	Pts: Bart, Vucic 9 Rebs: Kos 7 Asts: Krajnovic 5	Referees: Kerem Baki (TUR), Lukasz Jankowski (POL), Nir Meirson (ISR)

== Playoff brackets ==
=== Main bracket ===
Round of 16
3 August
France	74
Germany	51
3 August
Slovenia	85
Croatia	83
3 August
Turkey	82
Great Britain	38
3 August
Lithuania	88
Czech Republic	57
3 August
Israel	65
Poland	58
3 August
Serbia	80
Montenegro	56
3 August
Spain	73
North Macedonia	45
3 August
Italy	64
Greece	55

Quarterfinals
4 August
France	57
Slovenia	58
4 August
Turkey	64
Lithuania	61
4 August
Israel	62
Serbia	68
4 August
Spain	72
Italy	59

Semifinals
6 August
Slovenia	64
Turkey	79
6 August
Serbia	38
Spain	60

Final
7 August
Turkey	61
Spain	68
3rd place match
7 August
Slovenia	67
Serbia	70

=== 5th place bracket ===
5th–8th place semifinals
6 August
France	80
Lithuania	60
6 August
Israel	67
Italy	75

5th place match
7 August
France	66
Italy	56
7th place match
7 August
Lithuania	89
Israel	64

=== 9th place bracket ===
9th–16th place quarterfinals
4 August
Germany	88
Croatia	75
4 August
Great Britain	62
Czech Republic	80
4 August
Poland	74
Montenegro	68
4 August
North Macedonia	61
Greece	77

9th–12th place semifinals
6 August
Germany	70
Czech Republic	77
6 August
Poland	70
Greece	63

9th place match
7 August
Czech Republic	39
Poland	76
11th place match
7 August
Germany	74
Greece	67

=== 13th place bracket ===
13th–16th place semifinals
6 August
Croatia	85
Great Britain	52
6 August
Montenegro	62
North Macedonia	65

13th place match
7 August
Croatia	72
North Macedonia	59
15th place match
7 August
Great Britain	78
Montenegro	74

== Playoff results ==
=== Round of 16 ===
3 August 2022	France	74–51	Germany	Bornova Belediyesi Atatürk Sport Complex, İzmir
13:45	Scoring by quarter: 19–12, 20–13, 23–16, 12–10
	Pts: Perrin 18; Rebs: Perrin 13; Asts: Houinsou 5	Boxscore	Pts: Brockhoff 12; Rebs: Schulte 8 Asts: Machowski 5	Referees: Igor Mitrovski (MKD), Manuel Attard (ITA), Sinisa Prpa (SRB)

3 August 2022	Serbia	80–56	Montenegro	Karşıyaka Arena, İzmir
13:45	Scoring by quarter: 17–17, 27–11, 20–12, 16–16
	Pts: Šarenac 22; Rebs: Ristić 10; Asts: Šarenac 4	Boxscore	Pts: Hot 18; Rebs: Jokovic, Radonjic 5 Asts: Hot 6	Referees: Ventsislav Velikov (BUL), Gintaras Maciulis (LTU), Alberto Baena Arroyo (ESP)

3 August 2022	Israel	65–58	Poland	Karşıyaka Arena, İzmir
16:00	Scoring by quarter: 16–14, 18–14, 21–15, 10–15
	Pts: Yaacov 16; Rebs: Yaacov 10; Asts: Yaacov 9	Boxscore	Pts: Wrzeszcz 17; Rebs: Wilczek 12; Asts: Andrzejewski, Kempa 3	Referees: Martin Vulic (CRO), Iain Macdonald (GBR), Armin Mutapcic (GER)

3 August 2022	Slovenia	85–83	Croatia	Bornova Belediyesi Atatürk Sport Complex, İzmir
16:00	Scoring by quarter: 19–18, 25–22, 22–18, 19–25
	Pts: Osojnik 18; Rebs: Osojnik 7 Asts: Zemljic 6	Boxscore	Pts: Pavin 20; Rebs: Jelavic 12; Asts: Krajnovic 5	Referees: Luis Castillo (ESP), Michal Proc (POL), Alessandro Perciavalle (ITA)

3 August 2022	Italy	64–55	Greece	Karşıyaka Arena, İzmir
18:15	Scoring by quarter: 16–16, 17–9, 18–8, 13–22
	Pts: Moretti, Visintin 15; Rebs: Innocenti 8 Asts: Moretti, Visintin 6	Boxscore	Pts: Korkontzelos 13; Rebs: Zougris 10; Asts: Korkontzelos 4	Referees: Thomas Bissuel (FRA), Kerem Baki (TUR), Primož Pipan (SLO)

3 August 2022	Lithuania	88–57	Czech Republic	Bornova Belediyesi Atatürk Sport Complex, İzmir
18:15	Scoring by quarter: 27–16, 24–13, 21–13, 16–15
	Pts: Murauskas 20; Rebs: Krivas 14; Asts: Klimas 7	Boxscore	Pts: Lukes 13; Rebs: Rychtecky 5 Asts: Rychtecky 5	Referees: Radomir Vojinovic (MNE), Nir Meirson (ISR), Javier Torres Sanchez (ESP)

3 August 2022	Turkey	82–38	Great Britain	Bornova Belediyesi Atatürk Sport Complex, İzmir
20:30	Scoring by quarter: 23–11, 18–7, 30–10, 11–10
	Pts: Yigitoglu 17; Rebs: Yigitoglu 9 Asts: Mestoglu 5	Boxscore	Pts: Davis 14; Rebs: Tucker 10; Asts: Round 4	Referees: Petros Papapetrou (GRE), Lukasz Jankowksi (POL), Balazs Meszaros (HUN)

3 August 2022	Spain	73–45	North Macedonia	Karşıyaka Arena, İzmir
20:30	Scoring by quarter: 19–14, 18–7, 21–13, 15–11
	Pts: Almansa 15; Rebs: Almansa 7 Asts: Moreno 5	Boxscore	Pts: Simikj 11; Rebs: Simikj 6 Asts: Dimitrievski 4	Referees: Ivor Matejek (CZE), Vilius Maciulaitis (LTU), Anastasios Kardaris (GRE)

=== 9th–16th place quarterfinals ===
4 August 2022	Germany	88–75	Croatia	Bornova Belediyesi Atatürk Sport Complex, İzmir
13:45
		Boxscore

4 August 2022	Poland	74–68	Montenegro	Bornova Belediyesi Atatürk Sport Complex, İzmir
16:00
		Boxscore

4 August 2022	North Macedonia	61–77	Greece	Bornova Belediyesi Atatürk Sport Complex, İzmir
18:15
		Boxscore

4 August 2022	Great Britain	62–80	Czech Republic	Bornova Belediyesi Atatürk Sport Complex, İzmir
20:30
		Boxscore

=== 13th–16th place semifinals ===
6 August 2022	Croatia	85–52	Great Britain	Bornova Belediyesi Atatürk Sport Complex, İzmir
13:45
		Boxscore

6 August 2022	Montenegro	62–65	North Macedonia	Bornova Belediyesi Atatürk Sport Complex, İzmir
16:00
		Boxscore

=== 15th place match ===
7 August 2022	Great Britain	78–74	Montenegro	Bornova Belediyesi Atatürk Sport Complex, İzmir
11:00
		Boxscore

=== 13th place match ===
7 August 2022	Croatia	72–59	North Macedonia	Karşıyaka Arena, İzmir
13:45
		Boxscore

=== 9th–12th place semifinals ===
6 August 2022	Germany	70–77	Czech Republic	Bornova Belediyesi Atatürk Sport Complex, İzmir
18:15
		Boxscore

6 August 2022	Poland	70–63	Greece	Bornova Belediyesi Atatürk Sport Complex, İzmir
20:30
		Boxscore

=== 11th place match ===
7 August 2022	Germany	74–67	Greece	Bornova Belediyesi Atatürk Sport Complex, İzmir
16:00
		Boxscore

=== 9th place match ===
7 August 2022	Czech Republic	39–76	Poland	Bornova Belediyesi Atatürk Sport Complex, İzmir
18:15
		Boxscore

=== Championship quarterfinals ===
4 August 2022	France	57–58	Slovenia	Karşıyaka Arena, İzmir
13:45	Scoring by quarter: 15-7, 16-9, 10-23, 16-19
	Pts: Cissoko, Perrin 12; Rebs: Rupert 6 Asts: Houinsou 5	Boxscore	Pts: Skorjanc 14; Rebs: Mivsek 7 Asts: Zemljic 5	Referees: Ventsislav Velikov (BUL), Iain Macdonald (GBR), Alberto Baena Arroyo (ESP)

4 August 2022	Israel	62–68	Serbia	Karşıyaka Arena, İzmir
16:00	Scoring by quarter: 20–15, 19–7, 11–22, 12–24
	Pts: Yaacov 17; Rebs: Berman, Yaacov 10; Asts: Yaacov 4	Boxscore	Pts: Milijasević 16; Rebs: Đoković 15; Asts: Milijasević 8	Referees: Petros Papapetrou (GRE), Ivor Matejek (CZE), Lukasz Jankowski (POL)

4 August 2022	Spain	72–59	Italy	Karşıyaka Arena, İzmir
18:15	Scoring by quarter: 20–21, 21–14, 14–11, 17–13
	Pts: Villar 15; Rebs: Almansa 12; Asts: Rodriguez 8	Boxscore	Pts: Visintin 18; Rebs: Salvioni 6 Asts: Visintin 4	Referees: Radomir Vojinovic (MNE), Igor Mitrovski (MKD), Balazs Meszaros (HUN)

4 August 2022	Turkey	64–61	Lithuania	Karşıyaka Arena, İzmir
20:30	Scoring by quarter: 22–17, 10–10, 13–21, 19–13
	Pts: Buyuktuncel 14; Rebs: Buyuktuncel 8 Asts: Buyuktuncel 5	Boxscore	Pts: Murauskas 19; Rebs: Murauskas, Krivas 9 Asts: Babraitis, Kublickas 3	Referees: Michal Proc (POL), Martin Vulic (CRO), Anastasios Kardaris (GRE)

=== 5th–8th place semifinals ===
6 August 2022	France	80–60	Lithuania	Karşıyaka Arena, İzmir
13:45
		Boxscore

6 August 2022	Israel	67–75	Italy	Karşıyaka Arena, İzmir
16:00
		Boxscore

=== 7th place match ===
7 August 2022	Lithuania	89–64	Israel	Bornova Belediyesi Atatürk Sport Complex, İzmir
13:45
		Boxscore

=== 5th place match ===
7 August 2022	France	66–56	Italy	Karşıyaka Arena, İzmir
16:00
		Boxscore

=== Championship semifinals ===
6 August 2022	Serbia	38–60	Spain	Karşıyaka Arena, İzmir
18:15	Scoring by quarter: 7–12, 6–19, 10–19, 15–10
	Pts: Đoković 13; Rebs: three players 5 Asts: Radaković 2	Boxscore	Pts: Almansa 21; Rebs: Almansa 12; Asts: Rodriguez 4	Referees: Michal Proc (POL), Beniamino Manuel Attard (ITA), Anastasios Kardaris (GRE)

6 August 2022	Slovenia	64–79	Turkey	Karşıyaka Arena, İzmir
20:30	Scoring by quarter: 28–13, 15–26, 8–22, 13–18
	Pts: Osojnik 14; Rebs: Osojnik 7 Asts: Zemljic 5	Boxscore	Pts: Efeoglu 20; Rebs: Buyuktuncel, Efeoglu 8 Asts: Yildizoglu 6	Referees: Thomas Bissuel (FRA), Ventsislav Velikov (BUL), Ivor Matejek (CZE)

=== 3rd place match ===
7 August 2022	Slovenia	67–70	Serbia	Karşıyaka Arena, İzmir
18:15	Scoring by quarter: 16–13, 18–19, 20–20, 13–18
	Pts: Zulic 16; Rebs: Zemljic 8 Asts: Zemljic 5	Boxscore	Pts: Ćurčić 21; Rebs: Radaković 11; Asts: Milijasević 4	Referees: Luis Castillo (ESP), Kerem Baki (TUR), Beniamino Manuel Attard (ITA)

=== Final ===
7 August 2022	Turkey	61–68	Spain	Karşıyaka Arena, İzmir
20:30	Scoring by quarter: 14–22, 17–14, 8–15, 22–17
	Pts: Cengiz 12; Rebs: Buyuktuncel 7 Asts: Cengiz 5	Boxscore	Pts: Villar 20; Rebs: Almansa 15; Asts: Villar 5	Referees: Thomas Bissuel (FRA), Michal Proc (POL), Martin Vulic (CRO)

== Final standings ==
Rank	Team	Record
1st place, gold medalist(s)	Spain	7–0
2nd place, silver medalist(s)	Turkey	5–2
3rd place, bronze medalist(s)	Serbia	6–1
4	Slovenia	4–3
5	France	6–1
6	Italy	4–3
7	Lithuania	5–2
8	Israel	3–4
9	Poland	4–3
10	Czech Republic	2–5
11	Germany	2–5
12	Greece	2–5
13	Croatia	3–4
14	North Macedonia	1–6
15	Great Britain	2–5
16	Montenegro	0–7

Qualified for the 2023 FIBA Under-19 Basketball World Cup
Relegated to the 2023 FIBA U18 European Championship Division B

== Awards ==
2022 FIBA Europe
Under-18 Championship winner

Spain
Fifth title

Most Valuable Player
(Spain) Izan Almansa

All-Tournament Team

- PG – (Israel) Noam Yaacov
- SG – (Serbia) Ilija Milijašević
- SF – (Lithuania) Paulius Murauskas
- PF – (Spain) Izan Almansa – (MVP)
- C – (Turkey) Berke Büyüktuncel

== See also ==
- 2022 FIBA U18 European Championship Division B
