= Vidyadhar G. Kulkarni =

Indian-American operations researcher and academic

- Born: Vidyadhar Govind Kulkarni; September 22, 1955 (age 71); Solapur, India

Academic background
- Education: Indian Institute of Technology Bombay (B.Tech.); Cornell University (M.S., Ph.D.)
- Thesis: Ladder Processes for Markov and Semi-Markov Chains (1980)
- Doctoral advisor: N. U. Prabhu

Academic work
- Discipline: Operations research
- Sub-discipline: Applied probability, Queueing theory
- Institutions: University of North Carolina at Chapel Hill
- Notable works: Several textbooks Patent No. 5,434,848, titled Traffic Management in Packet Communications Networks
- Website: https://vkulkarn.web.unc.edu

Vidyadhar G. Kulkarni is an Indian-American operations researcher and academic. He is professor emeritus in the Department of Statistics and Operations Research at the University of North Carolina at Chapel Hill, where he served as its first department chair (2003–2009).

== Education ==
Kulkarni received a B.Tech. in mechanical engineering from the Indian Institute of Technology Bombay in 1976. He earned an M.S. in operations research in 1978 and a Ph.D. in operations research in 1980, both from Cornell University. The title of his thesis was "Ladder Processes for Markov and Semi-Markov Chains".

== Career ==
Kulkarni joined the University of North Carolina at Chapel Hill in 1981. He served as chair, Department of Operations Research (2000–2003). and, following departmental reorganization, as chair of the Department of Statistics and Operations Research (2003–2009).

His research has focused on stochastic modeling, queueing theory, service systems, telecommunications, and healthcare operations.

== Scholarship ==
Kulkarni has written two textbooks on stochastic models: one at the undergraduate level (the blue book) and one at the graduate level (the red book). The blue book is now in its second edition, while the red one is in its third edition. Both books cover the main topics in stochastic models: Discrete-time Markov chains, Poisson processes, continuous-time Markov chains, renewal processes, queueing models, Brownian motion, and diffusion processes.

- The blue book: Introduction to Modeling and Analysis of Stochastic Systems
- The red book: Modeling and Analysis of Stochastic Systems

He recently published an undergraduate text, An Introduction to Discrete Mathematics

His research has appeared in journals including Operations Research, Manufacturing & Service Operations Management, Production and Operations Management, European Journal of Operational Research, and Queueing Systems.

== Honors and recognition ==
- Kulkarni held the Norman L. Johnson Professorship at the University of North Carolina at Chapel Hill from 1997 to 2002.
- He is a co-inventor on U.S. Patent No. 5,434,848, titled Traffic Management in Packet Communications Networks.

== Personal life ==
Kulkarni is married to Radhika Kulkarni, whom he met while they were graduate students in operations research at Cornell University. Interestingly, they both came to Cornell because Cornell offered a temporary waiver of the $20 application fee. They have three sons, all of whom graduated from Cornell.
