= Noam Yaacov =

Israeli basketball player

Noam Yaacov נועם יעקב
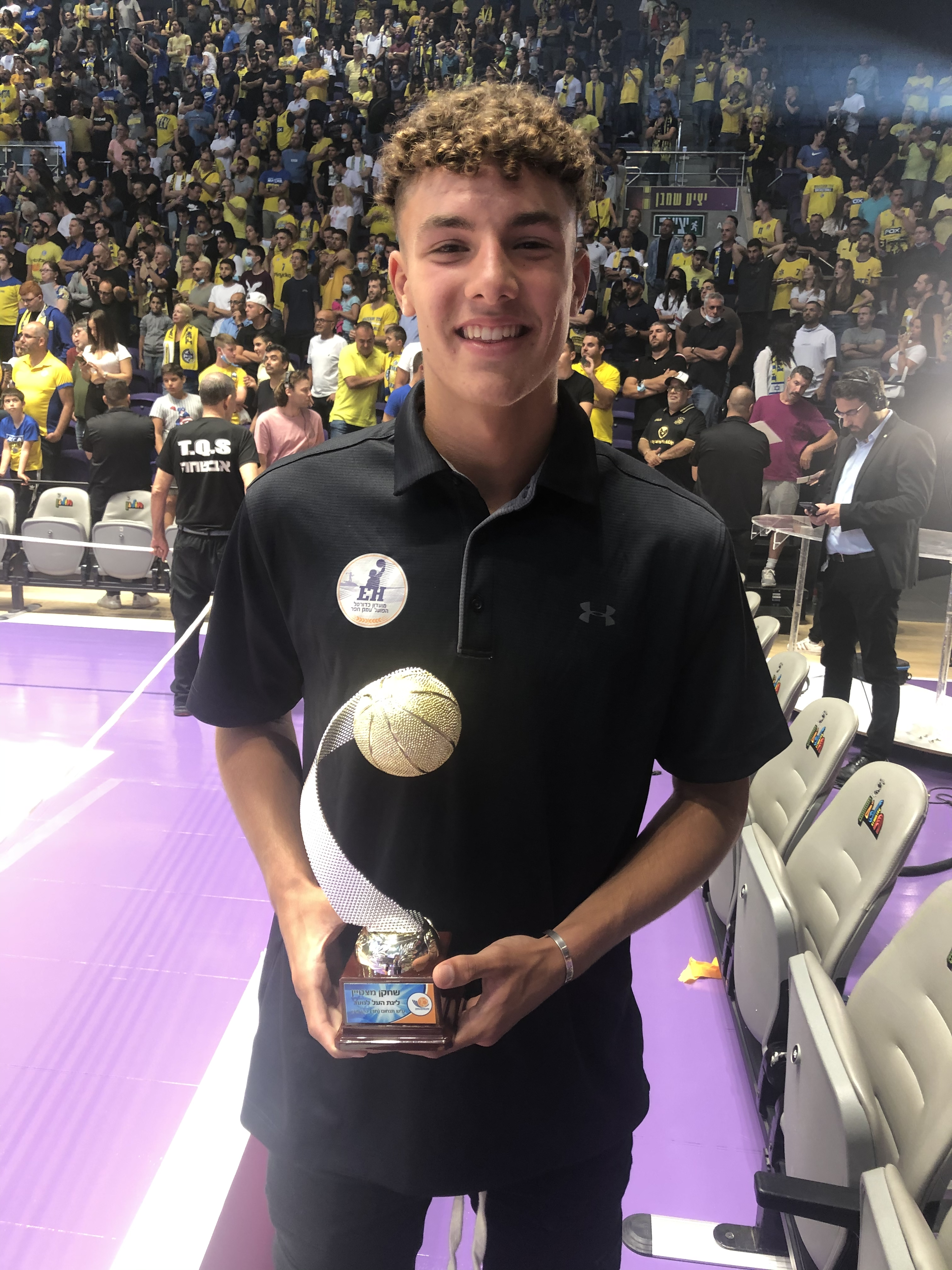
- Yaacov in 2021

No. 31 – Cleveland Charge
- Position: Point guard
- League: NBA G League

Personal information
- Born: October 20, 2004 (age 22) Virum, Denmark
- Listed height: 1.85 m (6 ft 1 in)

Career information
- NBA draft: 2026: undrafted
- Playing career: 2020–present

Career history
- 2020–2021: Hapoel Emek Hefer
- 2021–2025: ASVEL
- 2023: →Hapoel Jerusalem
- 2024–2025: →Hapoel Tel Aviv
- 2025–2026: Oostende
- 2026–present: Cleveland Charge

Career highlights
- EuroCup champion (2025); Israeli Cup winner (2023)
- Stats at NBA.com
- Stats at Basketball Reference

Noam Yaacov (Hebrew: נועם יעקב; born October 20, 2004) is an Israel-Danish professional basketball point guard, for the Cleveland Charge of the NBA G League. He also plays for the Israeli senior national team.

== Early life ==
Yaacov was born in Virum, Denmark, 15 kilometers outside of Copenhagen, to a Danish mother (Sidsel) and an Israeli-Jewish father (Yonatan). He was initially raised there, and began playing basketball at the age of four; his father was his basketball coach as he grew up.

In July 2018, at the age of 13, he immigrated to Israel without his parents, and lived with his Israeli grandparents. In Israel he resides in HaOgen, a kibbutz in which his grandparents also live. In 2021 he played for Hapoel Emek Hefer’s youth team, and was named the outstanding player of the Youth Premier League.

== College career ==
On April 20, 2026, it was announced that Yaacov had committed to play for the Utah Utes basketball team of the University of Utah, while maintaining his eligibility in the NBA draft, and participating in the NBA draft combine. On June 27, 2026, he signed with Utah for the 2026–27 season. However, on August 20, 2026, the NCAA ruled him ineligible by to play for Utah.

== Professional career ==
=== 2021–24 ===
On July 5, 2021, Yaacov signed a contract with French team ASVEL Basket of the LNB Pro A and the EuroLeague. On September 13, 2022, at 16 years of age he made his debut for the team, recording 11 points, 8 assists, and 7 rebounds. In 2021–22, Yaacov averaged 7.2 points, 4.0 assists, 3.0 rebounds, and 1.1 steals in 17.1 minutes per game, while shooting 47% from the floor, over 38 games.

In 2022–23 with ASVEL Basket he averaged 17.8 points, 8.2 assists, 5.8 rebounds, and 1.5 steals in 31.0 minutes per game over 13 games, all of them as a starter. He was named Eurobasket.com All-French ProA U21 Guard of the Year.

On January 4, 2023, Yaacov was loaned to Hapoel Jerusalem until the end of 2022–23 season, and he played for them in 22 games. He and the team won the 2022–23 Israeli Basketball State Cup.

In 2023–24, he played for ASVEL Basket, and averaged 3.0 points, 2.0 assists, and 1.0 rebounds in 12.0 minutes per game over 62 games, 4 of them as a starter.

On June 28, 2024, Yaacov was loaned to Hapoel Tel Aviv of the Israeli Basketball Premier League for the 2024-25 season. In 2024–25, he averaged 3.8 points, 3.2 assists, and 1.6 rebounds in 14.7 minutes per game over 33 games, 13 of them as a starter. He and the team won the 2025 Eurocup.

=== 2025–2026 ===
In 2025–26, playing for the Belgian team Ostende, Yaacov was named one of the three BNXT League MVP Finalists, after he averaged 17.4 points, 5.8 assists, and 1.2 steals per game, all leading the team, while adding 3.9 rebounds per game and shooting 46% from the floor, 38% from three-point range, and 76% from the free throw line, and starting 30 of the team's 40 games in which he played.

=== 2026-2027 ===
Yaacov was then invited to the 2026 NBA G League draft combine, where he impressed scouts in an NBA G League Elite Camp scrimmage. He was then called to the 2026 NBA draft combine.

On October 9, 2026, he was signed by the Cleveland Cavaliers to an Exhibit-10 contract for training camp. Before the NBA regular season he was waived by the Cavaliers and subsequently assigned to their G-League affiliate, the Cleveland Charge, for the 2026–2027 season.

Basketball commentator and former college basketball coach Fran Fraschilla wrote of Yaacov in May 2026: "He’s a scorer & playmaker who has great PNR vision & shooting form reminds me of Jimmer Fredette." NBA.com wrote:

Yaacov runs pick-and-roll with patience, changing speeds before slinging the ball to the open man while keeping his assist-to-turnover ratio positive. The point guard gets downhill with a low handle and a start-stop game that keeps bigger defenders guessing and draws fouls at a rate that points to craftiness inside the arc. He knocks down threes at a respectable clip ... and competes on the ball, also jumping in passing lanes when defending off the ball. Yaacov projects as a pick-and-roll guard who can run an NBA offense, push the pace in transition, and keep his teammates involved... NBA comparisons to Yaacov can be made to players like Goran Dragic and T. J. McConnell.

== National team career ==
=== Junior Team Israel ===
Yaacov played for Team Israel under-18 in the 2022 FIBA U18 European Championship. In seven games he averaged 19.3 points (2nd-highest in the tournament), 6.0 rebounds, 6.0 assists (leading the tournament), and 1.7 steals per game. He was selected to the All-Star 5 of the tournament.

Yaacov played for Team Israel under-20 in the 16-team 2023 FIBA U20 European Championship. In seven games he averaged 16.1 points (8th-best in the tournament), 4.4 rebounds, 7.6 assists (leading the tournament), and 1.0 steals per game, shooting 46% from the field, as Israel won the silver medal. He was again selected to the five-player All-tournament team, this time alongside teammate Danny Wolf.

Yaacov served as captain of and again played for Team Israel under-20 in the 2024 FIBA U20 European Championship. In five games he averaged 15.6 points (8th-best in the tournament), 4.5 rebounds, 7.3 assists (leading the tournament), and 1.6 steals per game.

=== Senior Team Israel ===
On 24 February 2023, Yaacov made his debut for the Israeli senior national team in the 2023 FIBA Basketball World Cup European Qualifiers. He played in two of Team Israel's 18 games, averaging 15.0 points, 4.0 rebounds, 4.5 assists, and 1.5 steals, while shooting 50% from the floor, 60% from three-point range, and 85% from the free throw line.

== Career statistics ==
Legend
GP	Games played	GS	Games started	MPG	Minutes per game
FG%	Field-goal percentage	3P%	3-point field-goal percentage	FT%	Free-throw percentage
RPG	Rebounds per game	APG	Assists per game	SPG	Steals per game
BPG	Blocks per game	PPG	Points per game	PIR	Performance index rating
**Bold**	Career high

=== EuroLeague ===
Year	Team	GP	GS	MPG	FG%	3P%	FT%	RPG	APG	SPG	BPG	PPG	PIR
2023–24	ASVEL	26	2	10.0	.328	.118	.722	.7	1.3	.3	—	2.2	1.0
Career		26	2	10.0	.328	.118	.722	.7	1.3	.3	—	2.2	1.0

=== Basketball Champions League ===
Year	Team	GP	GS	MPG	FG%	3P%	FT%	RPG	APG	SPG	BPG	PPG
2022–23	Hapoel Jerusalem	4	0	2.6	.250	.000	—	—	.2	—	—	0.5
Career		4	0	2.6	.250	.000	—	—	.2	—	—	0.5

=== Domestic leagues ===
Year	Team	League	GP	MPG	FG%	3P%	FT%	RPG	APG	SPG	BPG	PPG
2022–23	(Israel) Hapoel Jerusalem	Ligat HaAl	18	14.7	.397	.286	.783	1.6	1.9	.3	—	4.2
2023–24	(France) ASVEL	LNB Élite	35	13.6	.386	.353	.743	1.2	2.6	.5	.0	3.6

== See also ==
- Chanan Colman, Danish-Israeli professional basketball player
