= HaOgen =

Kibbutz in central Israel

HaOgen: הָעֹגֶן (Hebrew)
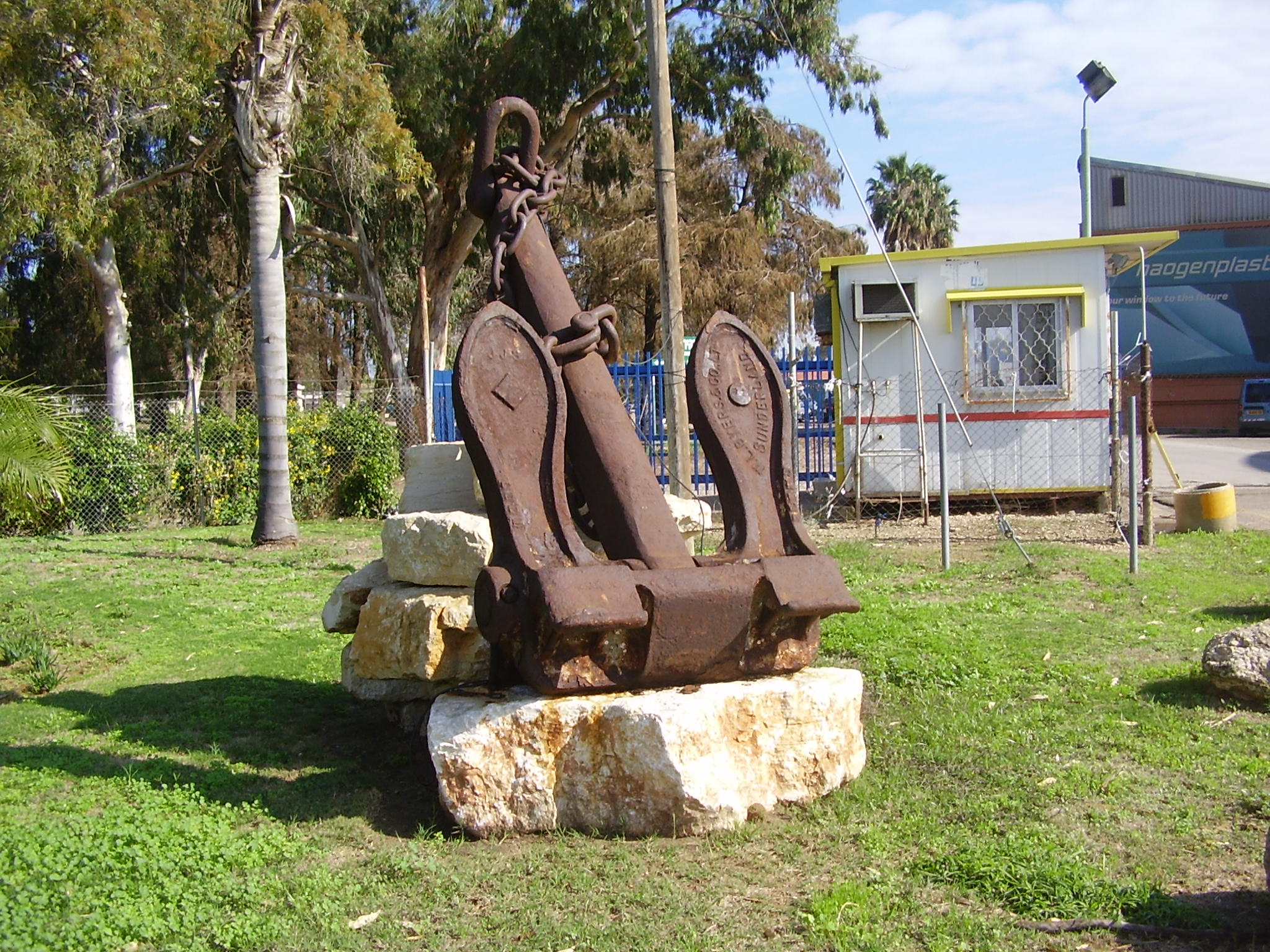

- Location within Central Israel
- Coordinates: 32°21′49″N 34°55′25″E
- Country: Israel
- District: Central
- Subdistrict: HaSharon
- Council: Hefer Valley
- Affiliation: Kibbutz Movement
- Founded: 28 August 1947
- Founder: Czechoslovak Jews
- Population (2024): 828
- Website: http://www.haogen.org.il/

HaOgen (Hebrew: העוגן, הָעֹגֶן, lit. 'Anchor') is a kibbutz in central Israel. Located in the Sharon plain, it falls under the jurisdiction of Emek Hefer Regional Council and is affiliated with Hashomer Hatzair. In 2024 it had a population of 828.

== History ==
The community was established on 22 April 1939 by Jewish refugees from Czechoslovakia. After spending eight years in a camp near Kfar Saba, they founded the kibbutz on 28 August 1947, on land located near the Arab village of Wadi Qabbani. The Jewish National Fund provided 700 dunams of land for the kibbutz.

== Notable people ==
- Haya Kaspi (born1948), operations researcher, statistician, probability theorist. and professor
- Shraga Weil (1918–2009), painter
- Noam Yaacov (born 2004), Israeli–Danish player in the Israeli Basketball Premier League
