= Samu Adler =

Finnish basketball player (born 2007)

No. 12 – Butler Bulldogs
- Position: Point guard
- League: Big East

Personal information
- Born: 10 August 2007 (age 19) Kirkkonummi, Finland
- Listed height: 1.98 m (6 ft 6 in)
- Listed weight: 90 kg (198 lb)

Career information
- High school: Helsinki Basketball Academy (Helsinki, Finland)
- College: Butler (2026–present)
- Playing career: 2023–present

Career history
- 2023–2024: HBA-Märsky
- 2024–2026: Salon Vilpas

Career highlights
- Korisliiga champion (2026); Korisliiga MVP (2026); Korisliiga Finals MVP (2026); Korisliiga Rookie of the Year (2025); Korisliiga Sixth Man of the Year (2025)

Samu Adler (born 10 August 2007) is a Finnish professional basketball player who plays as a point guard for the Butler Bulldogs. He previously played for Korisliiga team Salon Vilpas.

== Career ==
Adler started basketball with Tapiolan Honka, before joining Helsinki Basketball Academy. He played his first senior season with the academy team HBA-Märsky in the Finnish second-tier in 2023–24.

=== Salon Vilpas (2024–2026) ===
In August 2024, Adler joined Korisliiga team Salon Vilpas, after just turning 17 years of age. In February 2025, Adler played for the EuroLeague Next Generation team in the tournament in Ulm, Germany. During his debut season in Korisliiga with Vilpas, he recorded 12.2 points, 3.1 rebounds and 2.3 assists. He was named Korisliiga Rookie of the Year and Sixth Man of the Year in 2025, as Vilpas finished third and won the bronze medal.

On 7 October 2025, in the second game of the 2025–26 Korisliiga season, Adler recorded 34 points, 5 assists, 3 rebounds and 2 blocks for Vilpas in a win against Tapiolan Honka.

In May 2026, Adler led Vilpas to win the Finnish championship title and was named the Finals MVP after recording 32 points in the decisive game seven against Kataja.

=== Butler Bulldogs ===
On 20 April 2026, he committed to play for Butler University.

== National team career ==
Adler played 38 matches for the Finland U16 and U18 national teams in total.

He debuted with the Finland senior national team on 24 November 2024, against Georgia in the EuroBasket 2025 qualifiers.
