= 2019–20 Landstede Hammers season =

Landstede Hammers
2019–20 season
- Chairman: Hajo Bijleveld
- Head coach: Herman van den Belt
- Arena: Landstede Sportcentrum
- Dutch Basketball League: 1st place (cancelled due to COVID-19 pandemic)
- NBB Cup: Semifinalist
- FIBA Europe Cup: Last 16
- Dutch Supercup: Winners
Home	Away	European

The 2019–20 Landstede Hammers season was the 25th season in the existence of the club. The club played in the Dutch Basketball League (DBL), NBB Cup and FIBA Europe Cup

The season marked Landstede's first European appearance in 19 years. On 19 August 2019, the club announced they renamed to Landstede Hammers.

== Players ==
=== Squad information ===
Landstede Hammers roster
Players
Coaches

Pos.	No.	Nat.	Name	Ht.	Age
G	0	(Netherlands)	van Schaik, Bart	1.93 m (6 ft 4 in)	25 – 9 July 1999
PG	1	(United Kingdom)	van Oostrum, Devon	1.88 m (6 ft 2 in)	32 – 24 January 1993
PG	3	(Netherlands)	Oude Aarninkhof, Jerom	1.90 m (6 ft 3 in)	24 – 18 May 2000
G/F	5	(United States)	Dorsey-Walker, Sherron	1.94 m (6 ft 4 in)	32 – 16 March 1993
CG	7	(United Kingdom)	van Oostrum, Nigel (C)	1.96 m (6 ft 5 in)	34 – 19 September 1990
PG	9	(Netherlands)	Schilder, Mike	1.83 m (6 ft 0 in)	30 – 24 May 1994
PF	10	(Netherlands)	de Pagter, Ralf	2.00 m (6 ft 7 in)	35 – 22 July 1989
PF	11	(Netherlands)	Kherrazi, Mohamed	2.00 m (6 ft 7 in)	34 – 29 June 1990
C	14	(Netherlands)	Bleeker, Kevin (injured)	2.08 m (6 ft 10 in)	31 – 10 May 1993
SF	24	(United States)	Walker, Martez	1.98 m (6 ft 6 in)	29 – 2 April 1995
C	31	(Austria)	Rados, Jozo	2.05 m (6 ft 9 in)	31 – 3 August 1993
PF	42	(United States)	Dahlman, Noah	2.01 m (6 ft 7 in)	35 – 4 April 1989

Head coach

(Netherlands) Herman van den Belt

Assistant coach(es)

(Netherlands) Mark van Schutterhoef

Legend

- (C) Team captain
- (DC) Dual citizenship
- (DP) Development player
- (I) Import player
- Injured

- Roster
Updated: 6 March 2020

Note: Flags indicate national team eligibility at FIBA-sanctioned events. Players may hold other non-FIBA nationalities not displayed.

=== Depth chart ===
Pos.	Starting 5	Bench 1	Bench 2
C	Noah Dahlman	Jozo Rados	Kevin Bleeker
PF	Mohamed Kherrazi
SF	Sherron Dorsey-Walker	Ralf de Pagter
SG	Nigel Van Oostrum	Mike Schilder
PG	Devon Van Oostrum

=== Transactions ===
==== In ====
No.	Pos.	Nat.	Name	Age	Moving from		Type	Ends	Date	Source
1	PG	(United States)	Jordan Johnson	24	Rio Grande Valley Vipers	(United States)	Free	Undisclosed	31 July 2019	
24	F	(United States)	Martez Walker	24	Prometey Kamianske	(Ukraine)	Free	Undisclosed	6 August 2019	
11	PF	(Netherlands)	Mohamed Kherrazi	29	ZZ Leiden	(Netherlands)	Free	Undisclosed	12 August 2019	
1	PG	(United Kingdom)	Devon Van Oostrum	26	Prienai	(Lithuania)	Free	Undisclosed	4 December 2019	
31	C	(Austria)	Jozo Rados	26	Union Neuchâtel Basket	(Switzerland)	Free	Undisclosed	10 February 2020	

==== Out ====
No.	Pos.	Nat.	Name	Age	Moving to		Type	Date	Source
14	F	(Netherlands)	Olaf Schaftenaar	26	Real Canoe	(Spain)	Free	4 June 2019	
10	SG	(Canada)	Kaza Kajami-Keane	25	Mitteldeutscher BC	(Germany)	End of contract	31 July 2019	
16	C	(Netherlands)	Freek Vos	22	Free agent		End of contract	8 July 2019	
20	C	(United States)	Kayel Locke	24	Rain or Shine Elasto Painters	(Philippines)	End of contract		
1	PG	(United States)	Jordan Johnson	24			Released		

== Pre-season ==
The Hammers began their pre-season on 31 August 2019.
Win Draw Loss

31 August 2019 1	Landstede Hammers (Netherlands)	78–58	(Netherlands) Feyenoord	Urk
		Report		Arena: Sporthal Vlechttuinen

7 September 2019 2	Okapi Aalstar (Belgium)	78–71	(Netherlands) Landstede Hammers	Aalst
	Pts: Martin 17	Report	Pts: Johnson 22	Arena: Okapi Forum

8 September 2019 3	Kangoeroes Mechelen (Belgium)	76–76	(Netherlands) Landstede Hammers	Mechelen

12 September 2019 4	Landstede Hammers (Netherlands)	89–51	(Netherlands) Den Helder Suns	Zwolle
				Arena: Landstede Sportcentrum

17 September 2019 5	Landstede Hammers (Netherlands)	91–58	(Netherlands) Apollo Amsterdam	Zwolle
	Pts: Bleeker 20		Pts: Hope 12	Arena: Landstede Sportcentrum

== Dutch Basketball Supercup ==
As the champions of the 2018–19 Dutch Basketball League, Hammers qualified for its second Supercup game.

Game	Date	Venue	Opponents	Result	High points	High rebounds	High assists
Supercup	22 September 2019	H	ZZ Leiden	78–68	Jordan Johnson (26)	Mohamed Kherrazi (12)	Mohamed Kherrazi (6)

== Dutch Basketball League ==
=== Regular season ===
Game	Date	Venue	Opponents	Result	High points	High rebounds	High assists	Record
1	29 September 2019	A	Aris Leeuwarden	78–92	Jordan Johnson (22)	Mohamed Kherrazi (8)	Mohamed Kherrazi (6)	1–0
2	2 October 2019	H	BAL	78–54	Jordan Johnson (19)	Mohamed Kherrazi (13)	Three players (3)	2–0
3	5 October 2019	A	ZZ Leiden	82–73	Jordan Johnson (22)	Mohamed Kherrazi (11)	Jordan Johnson (8)	2–1
4	13 October 2019	H	Donar	77–70	Jordan Johnson (22)	Mohamed Kherrazi (12)	Kherrazi, Dorsey-Walker (4)	3–1
5	16 October 2019	H	Aris Leeuwarden	103–62	Martez Walker (15)	Mohamed Kherrazi (9)	Jordan Johnson (9)	4–1
6	27 October 2019	H	Heroes Den Bosch	93–80	Sherron Dorsey-Walker (21)	Mohamed Kherrazi (9)	Jordan Johnson (5)	5–1
7	2 November 2019	A	Apollo Amsterdam	84–96	Noah Dahlman (23)	Noah Dahlman (7)	Mike Schilder (8)	6–1
8	9 November 2019	A	BAL	62–89	Noah Dahlman (19)	Sherron Dorsey-Walker (7)	Jordan Johnson (7)	7–1
9	17 November 2019	H	ZZ Leiden	92–75	Noah Dahlman (20)	Mohamed Kherrazi (11)	Jordan Johnson (7)	8–1
10	23 November 2019	A	Aris Leeuwarden					

== FIBA Europe Cup ==
=== Regular season ===
Pos	Team	Pld	W	L	PF	PA	PD	Pts	Qualification
1	(Israel) Ironi Nes Ziona	6	6	0	460	405	+55	12	Advance to second round
2	(Netherlands) Landstede Hammers	6	3	3	530	477	+53	9	Advance to second round
3	(Cyprus) Keravnos	6	2	4	464	491	−27	8	
4	(Austria) Kapfenberg Bulls	6	1	5	362	443	−81	7	

Source: FIBA Europe Cup

=== Top 16 ===
Pos	Team	Pld	W	L	PF	PA	PD	Pts	Qualification
1	(Latvia) Ventspils	6	5	1	558	479	+79	11	Advance to quarterfinals
2	(Ukraine) Kyiv Basket	6	4	2	481	484	−3	10	Advance to quarterfinals
3	(Hungary) Egis Körmend	6	3	3	512	516	−4	9	
4	(Netherlands) Landstede Hammers	6	0	6	475	547	−72	6	

Source: FIBA Europe Cup
