= 2019 Dutch Basketball Supercup =

Landstede Hammers	ZZ Leiden
78	68
- Date: 22 September 2019; 13:30 GMT+2
- Venue: Landstede Sportcentrum, Zwolle

The 2019 Dutch Basketball Supercup was the 8th edition of the Dutch Basketball Supercup. The game was played in the Landstede Sportcentrum in Zwolle for the first time.

The game featured Landstede Hammers, the first-time defending champions of the 2018–19 Dutch Basketball League, and ZZ Leiden, the winners of the 2018–19 NBB Cup.

Hammers won the game and secured its second Supercup title.

== Background ==
It was the re-match of the 2018–19 NBB Cup final, which was also played in the Landstede Sportcentrum and was won by Leiden, 69–87. Landstede Hammers came off its first national title in club history and saw most of its players returning. The team strengthened itself with two new Americans, Jordan Johnson and Martez Walker. Mohamed Kherrazi was acquired from Leiden. Kherrazi played his first game against his former team. Leiden entered the Supercup as national cup winners and added five new foreign players in the offseason.

== Match details ==
Landstede led comfortably for most of the game after a 23–15 start. After a halftime score of 48–31, Leiden managed to cut the deficit but never came close to a win. Johnson set an all-time record for most points in a Supercup game with 26.

22 September 2018	Landstede Hammers	78–68	ZZ Leiden	Zwolle
13:30 GMT+2	Scoring by quarter: 23–15, 25–16, 12–17, 18–20
	Pts: Johnson 26; Rebs: Kherrazi 12; Asts: Kherrazi 6	Boxscore	Pts: Williams 19; Rebs: Persons 8 Asts: De Jong 7	Arena: Landstede Sportcentrum

Starters:			Pts	Reb	Ast
PG	1	(United States) Jordan Johnson	26	7	4
SG	5	(United States) Sherron Dorsey-Walker	16	5	1
SF	24	(United States) Martez Walker	9	2	3
PF	11	(Netherlands) Mohamed Kherrazi	3	12	6
C	42	(United States) Noah Dahlman	12	6	2
Reserves:					
G	7	(United Kingdom) Nigel van Oostrum	7	1	3
C	14	(Netherlands) Kevin Bleeker	1	5	0
F	12	(United States) Teddy Gipson	13	5	4
G	9	(Netherlands) Mike Schilder	4	2	1
C	12	(Netherlands) Ralf de Pagter	0	2	1
G	0	(Netherlands) Bart van Schaik	DNP		
G	3	(Netherlands) Jeroem Oude Aarninkhof	DNP		
Head coach:
(Netherlands) Herman van den Belt

Hammers	Leiden

Starters:			Pts	Reb	Ast
PG	2	(United States) Tayler Persons	16	8	3
SG	4	(Netherlands) Braxton Huggins	10	2	4
SF	18	(Netherlands) Worthy de Jong	11	3	5
PF	8	(Suriname) Sergio de Randamie	4	3	3
C	0	(United States) Josh Cunningham	4	3	1
Reserves:					
PF	6	(United States) Jarvis Williams	16	9	1
C	33	(Croatia) Drago Pasalic	4	4	2
PG	5	(Netherlands) Marijn Ververs	0	1	0
G/F	13	(Netherlands) Troy Emeka Koehler	DNP		
G/F	7	(Netherlands) Twan Polman	DNP		
Head coach:
(Netherlands) Rolf Franke
