= Mike Schilder =

Dutch basketball player (born 1994)

Free agent
- Position: Point guard

Personal information
- Born: 24 May 1994 (age 31) Eindhoven, Netherlands
- Listed height: 6 ft 0 in (1.83 m)

Career information
- Playing career: 2010–present

Career history
- 2010–2016: Den Bosch
- 2016–2022: Landstede Hammers
- 2022–2024: Yoast United

Career highlights
- 3× DBL champion (2012, 2015, 2019); Dutch Cup champion (2013); 3× Dutch Supercup champion (2013, 2015, 2017)

Mike Gerardus T. Schilder (born 24 May 1994) is a Dutch professional basketball player who last played for Yoast United of the BNXT League. Formerly, he played for Den Bosch of the Dutch Basketball League (DBL).

== Early life ==
Schilder started playing basketball at age 10 with High Five in Tilburg. When he was 14, he switched to the Den Bosch youth academy.

== Professional career ==
In the 2010–11 season, Schilder made his professional debut for Den Bosch, back then named EiffelTowers Den Bosch. In 2012, he re-signed for one year. In June 2013, he re-signed again with Den Bosch.

In 2016, Schilder signed with Landstede Hammers. He helped the Hammers win their first national championship in the 2018–19 season. He left the team after the 2021–22 season.

On 18 June 2022, he signed with Yoast United of the BNXT League.

== International career ==
Schilder was a member of Dutch national youth squads on multiple occasions. He played for the U20 national team at the 2014 FIBA U20 European Championship.
