= 2022 Dutch Basketball Supercup =

10th edition of the Dutch Basketball Supercup

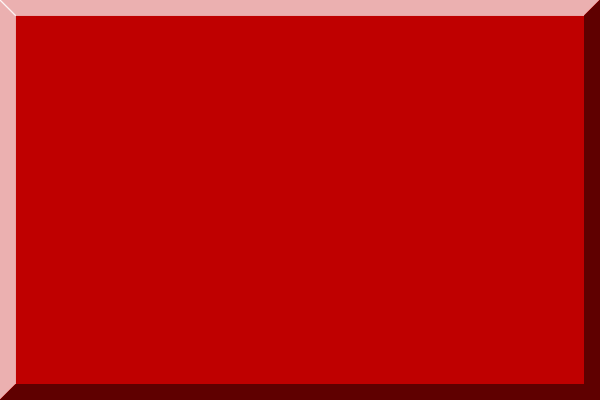

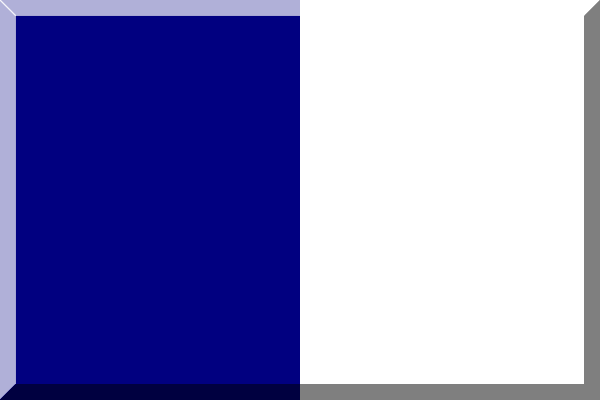
Heroes Den Bosch	Donar
76	59
Head coach: Erik Braal	Head coach: Matthew Otten
- Date: 28 September 2022; 15:00
- Venue: Maaspoort, 's-Hertogenbosch
- MVP: Chris-Ebou Ndow (Heroes Den Bosch)

The 2022 Dutch Basketball Supercup was the 10th edition of the Dutch Basketball Supercup. The game was played on 28 September 2022 in the Maaspoort in 's-Hertogenbosch. The defending Dutch champions Heroes Den Bosch easily defeated Donar, winners of the 2021–22 Dutch Basketball Cup. Heroes won their third Supercup title. Vernon Taylor of Donar was the top scorer of the game with 20 points, while Heroes player Chris-Ebou Ndow was named MVP of the game.

== Match details ==
28 September 2022	Heroes Den Bosch	76–59	Donar	's-Hertogenbosch
15:00	Scoring by quarter: 24–10, 22–18, 13–16, 17–15
	Pts: Price 14		Pts: Vernon Taylor 20	Arena: Maaspoort

Heroes / Donar
