= Kees Akerboom Jr. =

Dutch basketball player

Kees Akerboom
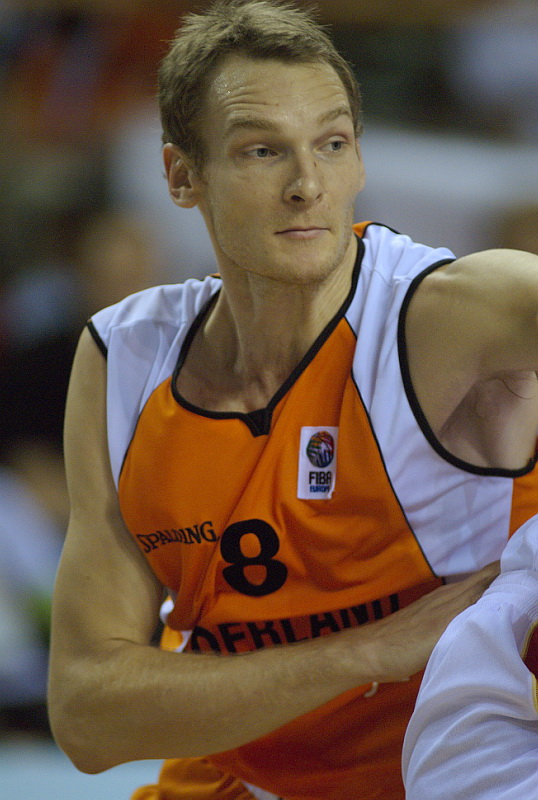
- Akerboom in 2008

Personal information
- Born: 20 December 1983 (age 42) Sint-Michielsgestel, Netherlands
- Listed height: 2.00 m (6 ft 7 in)
- Listed weight: 88 kg (194 lb)

Career information
- Playing career: 2001–2018
- Position: Small forward
- Number: 12

Career history
- 2001–2004: Den Bosch
- 2004–2006: Donar
- 2006–2018: Den Bosch

Career highlights
- No. 12 retired by Den Bosch; 3× DBL champion (2007, 2012, 2015); 4× Dutch Cup champion (2008, 2009, 2013, 2016); 2× Dutch Supercup champion (2013, 2015); All-DBL Team (2011); DBL Rookie of the Year (2003); 5× Kees Akerboom Trophy (2008, 2009, 2012, 2015, 2016); DBL MVP Under 23 (2004); 11× DBL All-Star (2004, 2006, 2008–2012, 2014–2017); DBL All-Star Game MVP (2010)

Kees Akerboom Jr. (born 20 December 1983) is a Dutch former basketball player. Kees is the son of Kees Akerboom Sr., a former successful professional basketball player as well. During the majority of his career, Akerboom played with Den Bosch, which he won three DBL championships with. He also played for the Netherlands national basketball team during his career.

== Professional career ==
Akerboom started his professional career with the same team as his father did, EiffelTowers Den Bosch in the Dutch Eredivisie.

On 29 May 2004, Akerboom signed with MPC Capitals from Groningen.

After two seasons with the Capitals, Akerboom returned to EiffelTowers. He won his first Dutch championship in 2007. He won his second in 2012, after beating ZZ Leiden 4–1 in the Finals. In 2015, Akerboom won his third championship after beating Donar 4–1 in the Finals.

On 31 May 2018, Akerboom announced his retirement at the age of 34. He set a new all-time record for games played for Den Bosch, with 671 games. His jersey number 12 was retired by Den Bosch.

== International career ==
Akerboom played 99 games for the Netherlands national basketball team over twelve years. He was a member of the team playing at EuroBasket 2015. On 5 July 2016, Akerboom's retirement from the Dutch national team was announced.

=== International statistics ===
Year	Team	GP	GS	MPG	FG%	3P%	FT%	RPG	APG	SPG	BPG	PPG
2015 EuroBasket	Netherlands	5	–	17.5	.304	.333	.750	1.2	.2	–	–	4.4

== Honours ==
=== Club ===
Den Bosch

- Dutch Basketball League: 2006–07, 2011–12, 2014–15
- NBB Cup: 2007–08, 2008–09, 2012–13
- Dutch Supercup: 2013

=== Individual ===
- DBL All-Star (11): 2004, 2006, 2008, 2009, 2010, 2011, 2012, 2014, 2015, 2016, 2017
- DBL All-First Team: 2010–11
- DBL Rookie of the Year: 2002–03
- DBL MVP Under 23: 2003–04
- DBL Three points percentage leader: 2007–08, 2008–09, 2010–11, 2011–12
- DBL All Star Game: 3 Point Contest Winner: 2008, 2009
- DBL All-Star Game MVP: 2010
