= 2017 Dutch Basketball Supercup =

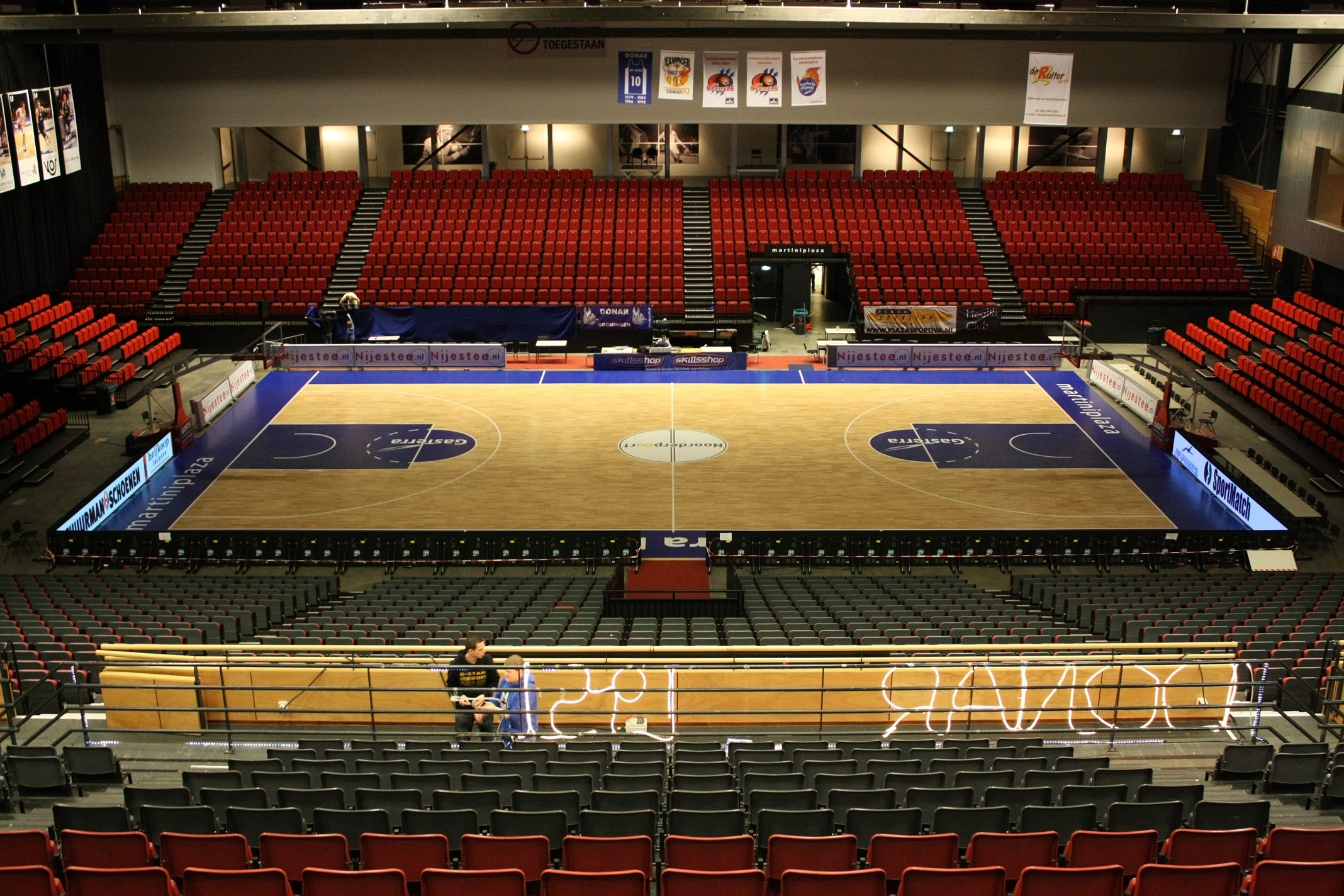
- The MartiniPlaza in Groningen hosted the game
| Donar | Landstede Zwolle |
|---|---|
| 69 | 77 |
- Date: 5 October 2017; 19:30 GMT+2
- Venue: MartiniPlaza, Groningen
- Attendance: 2,320

The 2017 Dutch Basketball Supercup was the 7th edition of the Dutch Basketball Supercup. The game was played in the MartiniPlaza in Groningen.

The game featured Donar, the defending champions of the Dutch Basketball League, and Landstede Basketbal, the runner-up of the 2016–17 NBB Cup. Landstede played in its first Supercup game.

Landstede won its first trophy in club history.

== Match details ==
| 5 October 2017 | Donar | 69–77 | Landstede Zwolle | Groningen |
| 19:30 GMT+2 | Scoring by quarter: 17–17, 22–14, 13–25, 17–21 |
| | Pts: Cunningham 16; Rebs: Dourisseau 9 Asts: Dourisseau 2 | Boxscore | Pts: Dahlman 20; Rebs: Schaftenaar 9 Asts: Gregory 7 | Arena: MartiniPlaza; Attendance: 2,320 |

| Starters: | | | Pts | Reb | Ast |
|---|---|---|---|---|---|
| PG | 20 | (United States) Brandyn Curry | 13 | 5 | 3 |
| SG | 1 | (Netherlands) Sean Cunningham | 16 | 2 | 1 |
| SF | 8 | (Netherlands) Jason Dourisseau | 8 | 9 | 2 |
| PF | 24 | (United States) Evan Bruinsma | 14 | 6 | 2 |
| C | 33 | (Croatia) Drago Pašalić | 7 | 4 | 2 |
| Reserves: | | | | | |
| G | 3 | (Netherlands) Aron Royé | 2 | 1 | 0 |
| G | 6 | (Netherlands) Sjoerd Koopmans | DNP | | |
| F | 12 | (Netherlands) Daan Maring | DNP | | |
| C | 14 | (Netherlands) Thomas Koenis | 5 | 8 | 3 |
| C | 15 | (Netherlands) Rienk Mast | DNP | | |
| F | 21 | (Netherlands) Tim Hoeve | DNP | | |
| F | 31 | (United States) Stephen Domingo | 4 | 0 | 1 |
Head coach:
(Netherlands) Erik Braal

| Donar | Landstede |

| Starters: | | | Pts | Reb | Ast |
|---|---|---|---|---|---|
| PG | 7 | (Netherlands) Nigel van Oostrum | 7 | 8 | 5 |
| SG | 24 | (United States) Sherron Dorsey-Walker | 11 | 4 | 2 |
| SF | 12 | (United States) Franko House | 4 | 2 | 0 |
| PF | 14 | (Netherlands) Olaf Schaftenaar | 18 | 9 | 0 |
| C | 42 | (United States) Noah Dahlman | 20 | 4 | 1 |
| Reserves: | | | | | |
| F | 6 | (Netherlands) Lenno Witteveen | 0 | 1 | 1 |
| G | 8 | (Netherlands) Elay Wirjo | DNP | | |
| F | 9 | (Netherlands) Bart van Schaik | DNP | | |
| G | 10 | (United States) Jordan Gregory | 15 | 1 | 7 |
| F | 12 | (Netherlands) Ralf de Pagter | 2 | 1 | 1 |
| F/C | 16 | (Netherlands) Freek Vos | 0 | 0 | 0 |
Head coach:
(Netherlands) Herman van den Belt
