= 2014 Dutch Basketball Supercup =

Donar	ZZ Leiden
78	67
- Date: 27 September 2014
- Venue: MartiniPlaza, Groningen

The 2014 Dutch Basketball Supercup was the 4th edition of the Dutch Basketball Supercup. The game was played between Donar, the winner of the 2013–14 Dutch Basketball League, and ZZ Leiden, the winner of the 2013–14 NBB Cup.

== Match details ==
27 September 2014	Donar	78–67	Zorg en Zekerheid Leiden	Groningen
19:30 GMT+2	Scoring by quarter: 18–15, 24–15, 23–17, 13–20
	Pts: DeJuan Wright 20; Rebs: Ross Bekkering 11; Asts: Sean Cunningham 5	Boxscore	Pts: Will Felder 20; Rebs: Mohamed Kherrazi 11; Asts: Rogier Jansen 4	Arena: MartiniPlaza; Attendance: 1,040

Donar	Leiden

2014 Supercup winner
Donar
(1st title)
