= Ralf de Pagter =

Dutch basketball player

No. 11 – Heroes Den Bosch
- Position: Power forward
- League: Dutch Basketball League

Personal information
- Born: 22 July 1989 (age 37) IJmuiden, Netherlands
- Listed height: 2.02 m (6 ft 8 in)

Career information
- Playing career: 2009–present

Career history
- 2009–2011: Amsterdam
- 2011–2012: Rotterdam
- 2012–2017: Den Bosch
- 2017–2023: Landstede Hammers
- 2023-present: Heroes (Den Bosch)

Career highlights
- 2x Dutch League champion (2015, 2019); 3× Dutch Cup champion (2013, 2016, 2024); 3× Dutch Supercup champion (2013, 2015, 2017); DBL All-Star (2015)

Ralf de Pagter (born 22 July 1989) is a Dutch professional basketball player, who currently plays for Heroes (Den Bosch) of the Dutch Basketball League. De Pagter usually plays at the power forward position.

== International career ==
De Pagter played games for the Dutch national basketball team, starting from 2013. De Pager played with the Netherlands at EuroBasket 2015, where he appeared in two games.

== Honours ==
=== Club ===
Den Bosch

- Dutch Basketball League: 2014–15
- NBB Cup: 2012–13, 2015–16, 2023–24
- Dutch Supercup: 2013, 2015

Landstede Hammers

- Dutch Basketball League: 2018–19
- Dutch Supercup: 2017
