= Ivica Skelin =

Croatian professional basketball coach (born 1973)

Personal information
- Born: 19 September 1973 (age 53) Split, SR Croatia, SFR Yugoslavia
- Position: Head coach
- Coaching career: 2001–present

Career history

Coaching
- 2001–2004: Verviers-Pepinster (assistant)
- 2005–2006: Split
- 2006–2008: Verviers-Pepinster
- 2008–2010: Leuven Bears
- 2010–2011: Verviers-Pepinster
- 2011–2012: Spirou Charleroi (assistant)
- 2011–2014: Croatia (assistant)
- 2012–2015: GasTerra Flames / Donar
- 2015–2018: Split
- 2016–2017: Croatia (assistant)
- 2017–2018: Croatia
- 2018–2019: New Heroes Den Bosch
- 2019–2021: Split
- 2021–2022: Twarde Pierniki Toruń
- 2022–2024: Antwerp Giants
- 2024–2025: Legia Warsaw
- 2026: Czarni Słupsk

Career highlights
- As head coach: BNXT Belgian Coach of the Year (2023); Belgian Cup winner (2023); Dutch League champion (2014); 2× Dutch Cup winner (2014, 2015); Dutch Supercup winner (2014); 2× DBL Coach of the Year (2014, 2015)

Ivica Skelin (born 19 September 1973) is a Croatian professional basketball coach, who was most recently the head coach for Czarni Słupsk of the Polish Basketball League (PLK).

== Coaching career ==
=== Early years ===
Skelin started his club coaching career with Verviers-Pepinster in Belgium as an assistant coach in 2001, at which position he served until 2004, after that he coached youth teams for the Belgian club.

In 2005 Skelin was named the head coach of KK Split. He coached the team one year, after that he went back to Verviers-Pepinster, this time as head coach serving for two seasons.

From 2008 to 2010 he was the head coach of the Leuven Bears. In 2010 he returned to Verviers-Pepinster once again for one season as head coach.

=== Netherlands ===
After being named as an assistant coach with the Belgian club Spirou in the 2010–11 season Skelin became the head coach for the Dutch club GasTerra Flames of the Dutch Basketball League (DBL) in December 2012. Skelin was signed as a replacement for coach Hakim Salem, fired due to disappointing results. After the season he signed an extension for two more years with the club. In the 2013–14 season, Skelin won the double, both the DBL and NBB Cup, with the Flames.

=== Split ===
Skelin signed as head coach of his hometown club Split once again, in November 2015. On 29 May 2018 his contract expired and he left the club and was replaced by new coach Vladimir Anzulović.

=== Return to the Netherlands ===
On 4 September 2018 Skelin returned to the Netherlands by signing a one-year contract with the New Heroes Den Bosch. Under him, the Heroes finished third in the regular season and were eliminated in the semifinals by the later champions Landstede. His contract was not renewed after the season.

=== Return to Split ===
On 8 December 2019 following the departure of Ante Grgurević, Skelin was appointed as the head coach of Split for the third time in his coaching career. Under his leadership the club managed to secure its place in the 2020–21 ABA League First Division and win the second place of the 2021 Croatian National Cup.

On 17 February 2021 following a 70–79 loss to Zadar in the national cup final, Skelin was fired from Split.

=== Poland ===
On June 9, 2021, he has signed with Twarde Pierniki Toruń of the Polish Basketball League.

=== Antwerp Giants ===
On May 10, 2022, Skelin signed a 2-year contract with Telenet Giants Antwerp of the BNXT League. On 12 March 2023, Skelin and the Giants won the Belgian Cup after beating BC Oostende in the final.

=== Return to Poland ===
On June 5, 2024, Skelin joined Legia Warsaw of the Polish Basketball League (PLK).

On January 26, 2026, he signed with Czarni Słupsk of the Polish Basketball League (PLK).

== Coaching record ==
=== Dutch Basketball League ===
Including regular season games.

Team	Year	G	W	L	W–L%	Result
GasTerra Flames	2012–13	36	26	10	.722	Eliminated in semi-finals
GasTerra Flames	2013–14	36	32	4	.889	Champions
Donar	2014–15	28	21	7	.750	Eliminated in finals
Career		100	79	21	.790	

== National team coaching ==
=== Croatia ===
From 2011 to 2014 and again from 2016 to 2017 Skelin served as an assistant coach of the senior Croatia men's national team under head coaches Josip Vranković, Jasmin Repeša and Aleksandar Petrović.

On 15 September 2017 following unsuccessful EuroBasket tournament and departure of Aleksandar Petrović, Skelin was named the head coach of the Croatia national team. He was sacked by the Croatian Basketball Federation on 8 March 2018.
