= Sam Jones (basketball, born 1978) =

American-Dutch basketball player and coach

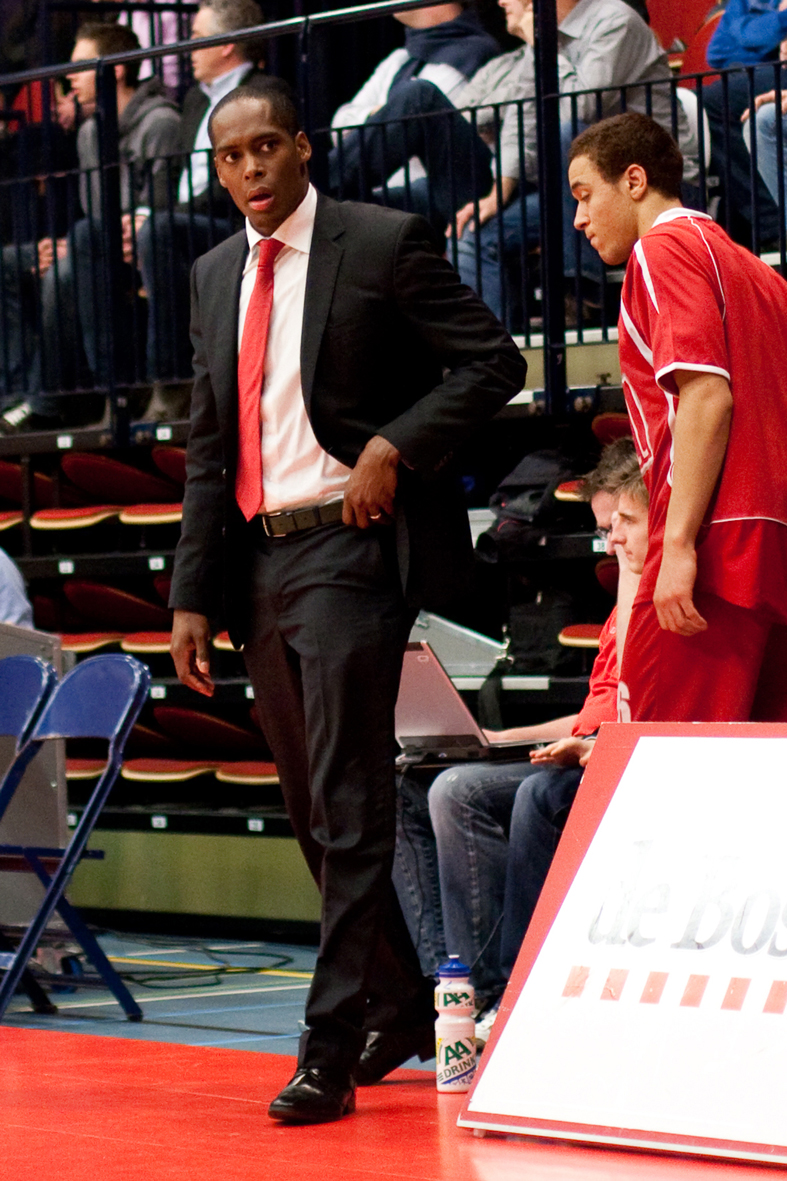
- Coach Jones during the game

Personal information
- Born: April 29, 1978 (age 48) Chicago, Illinois, U.S.
- Listed height: 1.89 m (6 ft 2 in)

Career information
- College: Northwood (1998–2000)
- Playing career: 2000–2010
- Position: Point guard
- Number: 9
- Coaching career: 2010–present

Career history

Playing
- 2000–2001: Gent United
- 2002–2007: EiffelTowers Den Bosch
- 2007: Rotterdam Challengers
- 2007–2008: Cáceres
- 2008–2009: Apollon Limassol
- 2009–2010: Keravnos
- 2010: Aris Leeuwarden

Coaching
- 2010–2013: EiffelTowers Den Bosch (assistant)
- 2013–2016: SPM Shoeters Den Bosch
- 2016–2019: Canton Charge (assistant)
- 2019–2021: Cleveland Cavaliers (player development coordinator)
- 2021–2023: Colorado State (assistant)

Career highlights
- As player: 3× DBL champion (2006, 2007); 2× DBL All-Star (2005, 2007); As coach: Dutch League champion (2015); Dutch Cup champion (2016); Dutch Supercup (2013); As assistant coach: Dutch League champion (2012); Dutch Cup winner (2013)

Samuel Lee Jones (born April 29, 1978) is an American-Dutch professional basketball coach and former player who is an assistant coach for the Colorado State Rams. He was an assistant coach for the Cleveland Cavaliers of the National Basketball Association (NBA).

During his playing career, Jones played in Europe for several clubs as well as for the Netherlands national basketball team.

== National team career ==
Jones started the process of obtaining a Dutch passport in 2017. He played 25 caps for the Netherlands national basketball team; he made his debut on August 14, 2008, against Sweden.

== Coaching career ==
After being an assistant for EiffelTowers Den Bosch (now Heroes Den Bosch) under Austrian coach Raoul Korner for three seasons, Jones became head coach of the club in 2013. In the 2014–15 season, he won his first DBL title with Den Bosch, after his team beat Donar Groningen 4–1 in the Finals.

On September 27, 2016, Jones was hired by the Canton Charge to serve as an assistant coach.

On August 21, 2019, Jones was named as a player development coordinator of the Cleveland Cavaliers.
