= Mohamed Kherrazi =

Dutch basketball player (born 1990)

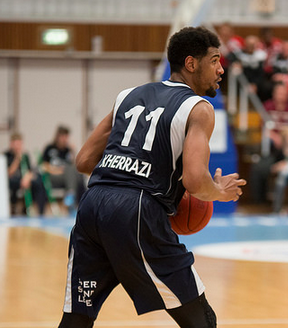
- Kherrazi playing for ZZ Leiden in 2016

Personal information
- Born: 29 June 1990 (age 36) Errachidia, Morocco
- Listed height: 2.01 m (6 ft 7 in)
- Listed weight: 93 kg (205 lb)

Career information
- Playing career: 2010–2023
- Position: Power forward
- Number: 9, 11, 14

Career history
- 2010–2011: ABC Amsterdam
- 2011–2019: ZZ Leiden
- 2019–2020: Landstede Hammers
- 2020–2021: Feyenoord
- 2020–2021: →Kangoeroes Mechelen
- 2021–2022: Heroes Den Bosch
- 2022–2023: Leuven Bears

Career highlights
- 2× Dutch national champion (2013, 2022); DBL Rookie of the Year (2010); 3× DBL Defensive Player of the Year (2015–2016, 2019); 2× Dutch Cup champion (2012, 2019); 3× Dutch Supercup champion (2011, 2012, 2019); 5× DBL All-Defense Team (2015–2019)

Mohamed Kherrazi (born 29 June 1990) is a Dutch-Moroccan former basketball player. During his career, he was a member of the Netherlands national team. Kherrazi is a three-time DBL Defensive Player of the Year winner, a record.

Kherrazi played 15 seasons of professional basketball, the majority of them being in the Netherlands with two short stints in Belgium.

== Early life ==
Kherrazi was born and grew up in Errachidia, where he started playing basketball with his brothers. They watched videos on their father's old computer and trained themselves. At age 12, his family moved to the Netherlands.

== Professional career ==
In his first professional season with ABC Amsterdam Kherrazi was named the DBL Rookie of the Year. In 2011, he signed with Zorg en Zekerheid Leiden. In the 2014–15 season, Kherrazi was named the DBL Defensive Player of the Year. In 2019, Kherrazi won his third Defensive Player award, which was a new record.

On 12 August 2019, Kherrazi signed with Landstede Zwolle.

On 1 October 2020, Kherrazi signed with Feyenoord Basketball. On 1 December, Feyenoord announced Kherrazi had extended his contract until 2022 but will play temporarily for Kangoeroes Mechelen in Belgium. Because the DBL season had been suspended due to the COVID-19 pandemic, Kherrazi continued with Kangoeroes. On 27 August 2021, Kherrazi and Feyenoord parted ways.

On 28 August 2021, Kherrazi signed a two-year contract with Heroes Den Bosch. In his first season with Heroes, Kherrazi won his second national championship. On 21 September 2022, Kherrazi and Den Bosch agreed to terminate his contract.

On December 2, 2022, he signed with Leuven Bears of the BNXT League.

In September 2023, Kherrazi announced his retirement on social media.

== National team career ==
Kherrazi made his debut for the Netherlands national basketball team in 2014, during the qualification rounds for EuroBasket 2015. With the Netherlands, Kherrazi qualified for EuroBasket 2015, which was the first continental tournament for the Dutch in 25 years.

At EuroBasket 2015, Kherrazi averaged 5.2 points and 4.3 rebounds per game, helping the Netherlands to a 1–4 record. Seven years later, he played at EuroBasket 2022, where he averaged 5.4 points and 3.4 rebounds as a starter. The Netherlands were winless at the tournament, finishing 0–5.

== Honours ==
=== Club ===
ZZ Leiden

- 2× Dutch Basketball League: (2013, 2022)
- 2× Dutch Cup: (2012, 2019)
- 2× Dutch Supercup: (2011, 2012)

Landstede Hammers

- Dutch Supercup: (2019)

=== Individual awards ===
- DBL Rookie of the Year: (2010)
- 3× DBL Defensive Player of the Year: (2015, 2016, 2019)
- 5× DBL All-Defense Team (2015, 2016, 2017, 2018, 2019)

== Player profile ==
"He (Kherrazi) is physical strong, isn't scared, is a great rebounder, an excellent defender and for a player of his age he knows how to bring the ball to the right players."

— Toon van Helfteren, 2012

Kherrazi is known as a good defender and solid rebounder. He usually plays as power forward but is occasionally used as small forward.

== Personal ==
His brother, Hicham, is also a professional player and has played for Apollo Amsterdam and Aris Leeuwarden.

In 2020, the short film Kherrazi 11:11, about his life, was released.
