= 2012 Dutch Basketball Supercup =

| EiffelTowers Den Bosch | ZZ Leiden |
|---|---|
| 57 | 67 |
- Date: 30 September 2012
- Venue: Maaspoort Sports & Events, Den Bosch

The 2012 Dutch Basketball Supercup was the 2nd edition of the Dutch Basketball Supercup. The game was played between EiffelTowers Den Bosch, the winner of the 2011–12 Dutch Basketball League, and ZZ Leiden, the winner of the 2011–12 NBB Cup.

== Match details ==
| 30 September 2012 | EiffelTowers Den Bosch | 57–67 | ZZ Leiden | Den Bosch |
| 15:00 GMT+2 | Scoring by quarter: 8-17, 9-9, 27-13, 13-28 |
| | Pts: Wright 18; Rebs: Wright 10; Asts: Young, Wright 4 | | Pts: Slagter 16; Rebs: Bekkering 9 Asts: Slagter 5 | Arena: Maaspoort Sports and Events |

| EiffelTowers | Leiden |

2012 Supercup winner
ZZ Leiden
(2nd title)
