= Jordan Gregory =

American basketball player (born 1992)

Free agent
- Position: Shooting guard

Personal information
- Born: June 26, 1992 (age 34) Pueblo, Colorado, U.S.
- Listed height: 6 ft 2 in (1.88 m)
- Listed weight: 194 lb (88 kg)

Career information
- High school: East (Pueblo, Colorado)
- College: Montana (2011–2015)
- NBA draft: 2015: undrafted
- Playing career: 2016–present

Career history
- 2016: Rockhampton Rockets
- 2016–2017: Aris Leeuwarden
- 2017–2018: Landstede Zwolle
- 2018–2019: Marín Peixegalego

Career highlights
- Dutch Supercup winner (2017); DBL scoring champion (2017)

Jordan Jace Gregory (born June 26, 1992) is an American professional basketball player.

== Professional career ==
In June 2016, Gregory signed with Aris Leeuwarden of the Dutch Basketball League (DBL). Gregory was the DBL scoring champion of the 2016–17 season, after he averaged 18.5 points per game. Gregory and Aris finished the DBL season in the 7th seed, missing out on the playoffs.

On July 18, 2017, Gregory signed a 1-year contract with Landstede Basketbal of the DBL. Over 32 regular season games, Gregory averaged 15.4 points, 4.0 rebounds and 2.4 assists per game. In the play-offs, Landstede was defeated in the semifinals by ZZ Leiden, 0–4.

In the 2018–19 season, Gregory played with CB Marín Peixegalego in the Spanish LEB Oro.
