= DBL Coach of the Year =

Dutch basketball award

The Dutch Basketball League Coach of the Year is an award given to the best coach in the Dutch highest professional basketball league. The award is given after the regular season and was first handed out in 1975 to Bill Sheridan.

== Winners ==
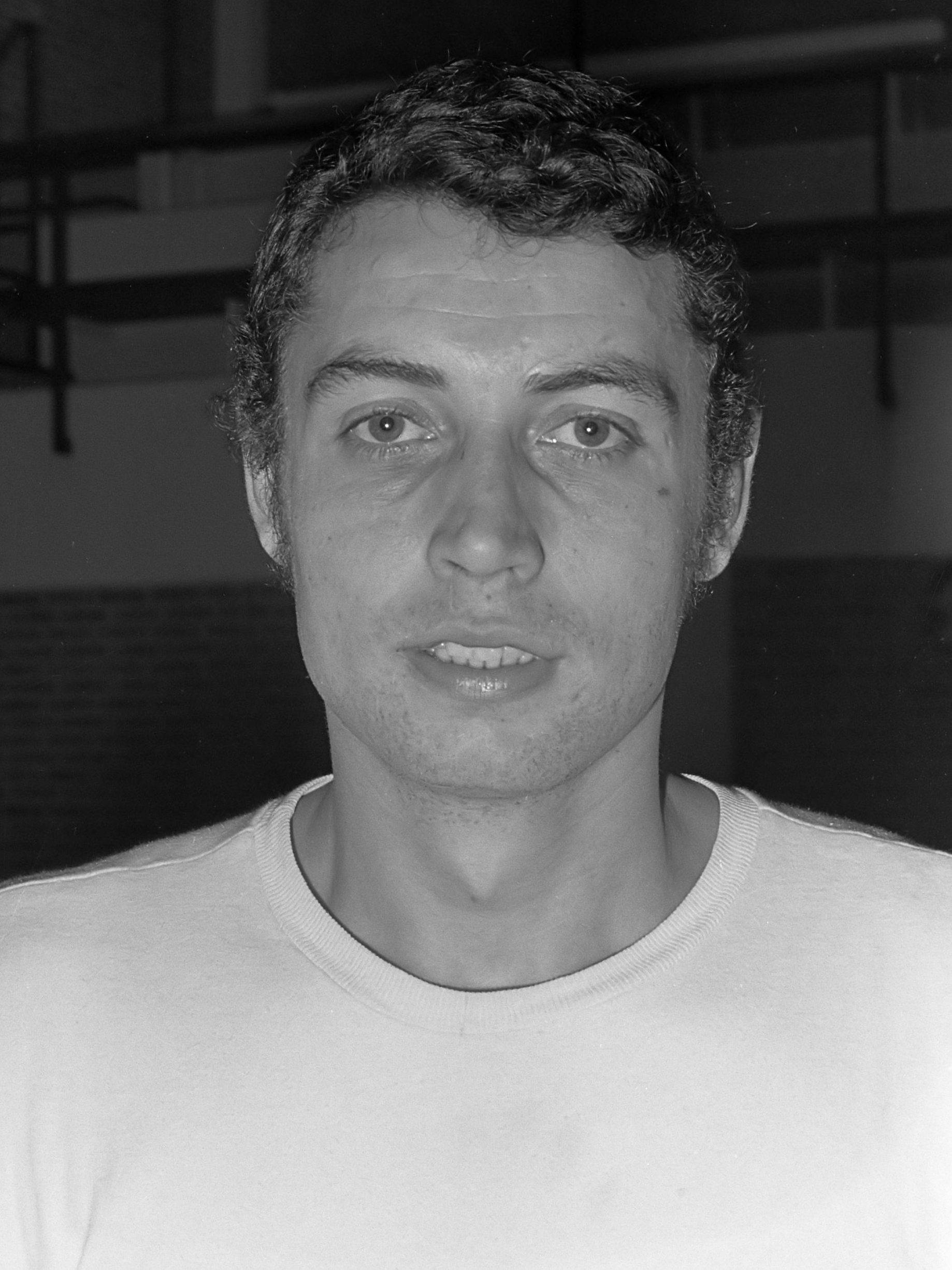
Ton Boot (1979, 1980, 1984, 1987, 1988, 1993, 2001)

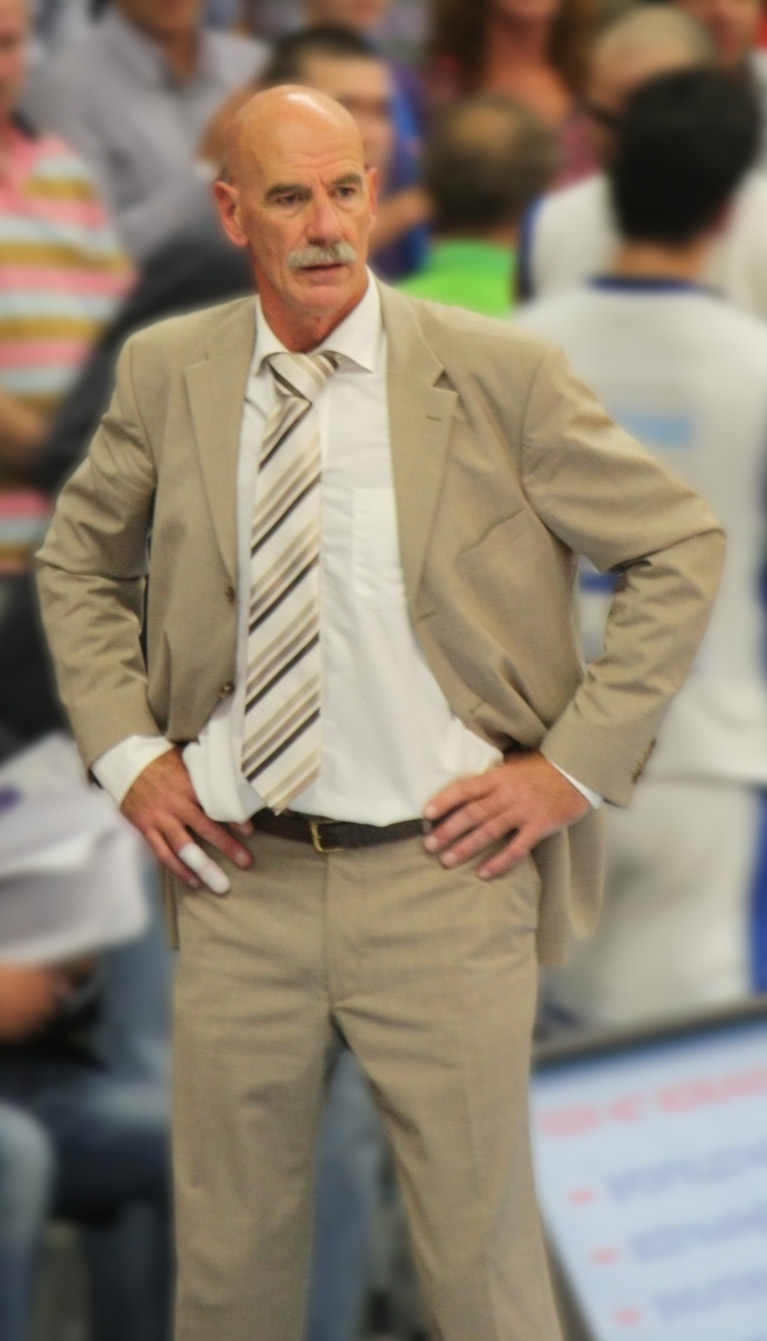
Toon van Helfteren (2003, 2010, 2011, 2012)

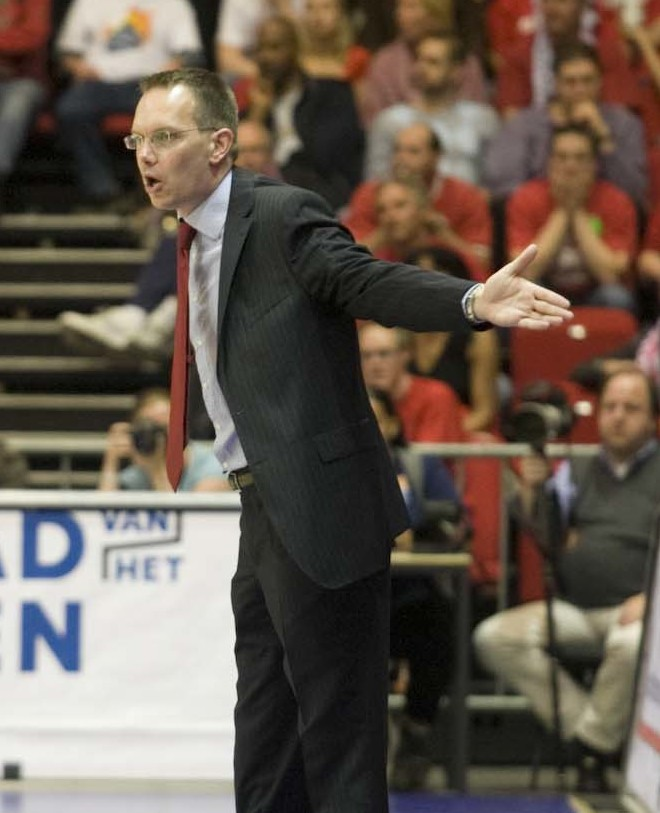
Erik Braal, who won the award three times

Key
Coach (X)	Name of the coach and number of times they had won the award at that point (if more than one)
Club (X)	Name of the club and the number of times a coach of it has won the award (if more than one)
W–L	Wins and losses
W%	Win percentage
†	Indicates multiple award winners in the same season

Year	Coach	Nationality	Team	W-L	W%	Ref.
1974–75	Bill Sheridan	United States	Punch			
1975–76	Tom Quinn	United States	Flamingo's Haarlem			
1976–77	Bill Sheridan (2)	United States	Den Bosch			
1977–78	Jim Parks	United States	Donar			
1978–79	Ton Boot	Netherlands	Den Bosch (2)			
1979–80	Ton Boot (2)	Netherlands	Den Bosch (3)			
1981–82	Edwin van der Hart	Netherlands	Amsterdam Astronauts			
1982–83	Ruud Harrewijn	Netherlands	Flamingo's Haarlem (2)			
1983–84^{†}	Ton Boot (3)	Netherlands	Den Bosch (4)			
1983–84^{†}	Maarten van Gent	Netherlands	Hatrans Haaksbergen			
1984–85	Ruud Harrewijn (2)	Netherlands	Leiden			
1985–86	Jan Dekker	Netherlands	Den Bosch (5)			
1986–87	Ton Boot (4)	Netherlands	Den Helder			
1987–88	Ton Boot (5)	Netherlands	Den Helder (2)			
1988–89	Jan Dekker (2)	Netherlands	Den Bosch (5)			
1989–90	Glenn Pinas	Netherlands	Red Giants Meppel			
1990–91	Jan Willem Jansen	Netherlands	Donar (2)			
1991–92	Jan Willem Jansen (2)	Netherlands	Akrides			
1992–93	Ton Boot (6)	Netherlands	Den Helder (3)			
1993–94	Meindert van der Veen	Netherlands	Den Helder (4)			
1994–95	Glenn Pinas (2)	Netherlands	Donar (3)			
1995–96	Glenn Pinas (3)	Netherlands	Donar (4)			
1996–97	Glenn Pinas (4)	Netherlands	Donar (5)			
1997–98	Jan Willem Jansen (3)	Netherlands	Amsterdam Astronauts (2)			
1998–99	Bob Gonnen	Netherlands	Den Helder (5)			
1999–00	Lawrence Nicols	United States	Den Bosch (6)			
2000–01	Ton Boot (7)	Netherlands	Amsterdam Astronauts (3)			
2001–02	Herman van den Belt^{^}	Netherlands	Landstede			
2002–03	Toon van Helfteren	Netherlands	Den Bosch (7)			
2003–04	Arik Shivek	Israel	Astronauts Amsterdam (4)	29–7	.805	
2004–05	Herman van den Belt^{^} (2)	Netherlands	Landstede (2)			
2005–06	Erik Braal	Netherlands	Rotterdam	20–16	.555	
2006–07	Michael Schuurs	Netherlands	Magixx	26–14	.650	
2007–08	Erik Braal (2)	Netherlands	West-Brabant Giants	27–13	.675	
2008–09	Arik Shivek (2)	Israel	Amsterdam (5)	35–5	.875	
2009–10	Toon van Helfteren (2)	Netherlands	Leiden (2)	22–14	.611	
2010–11	Toon van Helfteren (3)	Netherlands	Leiden (3)	30–6	.833	
2011–12	Toon van Helfteren (4)	Netherlands	Leiden (4)	22–6	.786	
2012–13	Raoul Korner	Austria	Den Bosch (8)	30–6	.833	
2013–14	Ivica Skelin	Croatia	Donar (6)	32–4	.888	
2014–15	Ivica Skelin (2)	Croatia	Donar (7)	21–7	.750	
2015–16	Herman van den Belt (3)	Netherlands	Landstede (3)	22–6	.786	
2016–17	Erik Braal (3)	Netherlands	Donar (8)	26–2	.923	
2017–18	Erik Braal (4)	Netherlands	Donar (9)	28–4	.875	
2018–19	Rolf Franke	Netherlands	Leiden (5)	31–3	.912	
2020–21	Geert Hammink	Netherlands	Leiden (6)	17–4	.810	

== Awards per coach ==
Awards	Player	Won in
7	Ton Boot	1979, 1980, 1984, 1987, 1988, 1993, 2001
4	Toon van Helfteren	2003, 2010, 2011, 2012
4	Glenn Pinas	1990, 1995, 1996, 1997
