= Olaf Schaftenaar =

Dutch basketball player (born 1993)

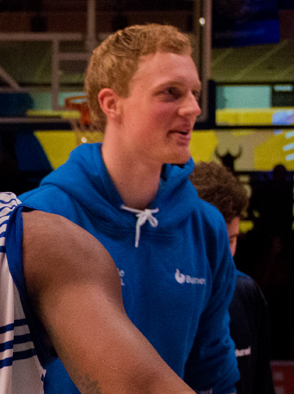
- Schaftenaar in 2016

No. 30 – Donar
- Position: Power forward
- League: BNXT League

Personal information
- Born: 15 May 1993 (age 33) Utrecht, Netherlands
- Listed height: 2.08 m (6 ft 10 in)
- Listed weight: 102 kg (225 lb)

Career information
- College: Oregon State (2012–2016)
- NBA draft: 2016: undrafted
- Playing career: 2016–present

Career history
- 2016–2019: Landstede Zwolle
- 2019–2020: Real Canoe
- 2020–2022: Bàsquet Girona
- 2022: CSU Sibiu
- 2022–present: Donar

Career highlights
- DBL champion (2019); Dutch Supercup winner (2017); DBL Rookie of the Year (2017); DBL All-Rookie Team (2017); DBL All-Star Game MVP (2017)

Olaf Schaftenaar (born 15 May 1993) is a Dutch professional basketball player for Donar of the BNXT League. He played college basketball for Oregon State before returning to the Netherlands to play professionally for Landstede Hammers. Schaftenaar also plays for the Netherlands national team.

== College career ==
He played basketball for Oregon State for four years. In his senior year, he averaged 6.4 points and 2.9 rebounds per game.

== Professional career ==
On 19 September 2016, Schaftenaar signed with Landstede Basketbal. He was named DBL Rookie of the Year after the 2016–17 DBL regular season.

In his second season, Schaftenaar and Landstede started the season by winning the Dutch Supercup on 5 October 2017. On 1 June 2019, Schaftenaar won the DBL championship with Landstede, the first in club history.

On 4 June 2019, Schaftenaar signed with Real Canoe of the Spanish LEB Oro for the 2019–20 season.

On 23 July 2020, Schaftenaar signed with Bàsquet Girona of the LEB Oro. He averaged 5.7 points and 2.2 rebounds per game in 16 games. On 26, February 2022, Schaftenaar signed with CSU Sibiu of the Liga Națională. He averaged 5.3 points on 41.3% shooting in 10 games with Sibiu.

On 10 July 2022, he signed with Donar, returning to the Netherlands after three years abroad.

== National team career ==
Schaftenaar played for the Netherlands' Under-18 and Under-20 teams. He later made his debut for the Netherlands senior team, first appearing for his country on 6 July 2017 against Bulgaria. He was on the 12-man roster for EuroBasket 2022.

== Personal life ==
Olaf is the son of Philip, who played professional basketball in the Eredivisie, and the younger brother of Oregon State alumni and professional player Roeland Schaftenaar.
