= 2015 Dutch Basketball Supercup =

SPM Shoeters Den Bosch	Donar
72	85
- Date: 4 October 2015
- Venue: Maaspoort, 's-Hertogenbosch

The 2015 Dutch Basketball Supercup was the 5th edition of the annual super cup game in Dutch basketball. This year reigning champions SPM Shoeters Den Bosch faced off against Donar Groningen, the 2014–15 NBB Cup winners.

Den Bosch won its first Supercup title.

== Teams ==
Team	Qualified as	Appearance
SPM Shoeters Den Bosch	2014–15 Dutch Basketball League champions	3rd
Donar	2014–15 NBB Cup winners	3rd

== Match ==
4 October 2015	SPM Shoeters Den Bosch	85–72	Donar	Maaspoort, 's-Hertogenbosch
15:00	Scoring by quarter: 20–12, 22–19, 17–10, 31–26
NOS	Pts: Aarts 14; Rebs: Wessels 7 Asts: Williams 4	Report	Pts: Sullivan 17; Rebs: Bekkering, Fieler 10; Asts: Brown 4

Shoeters	Donar

Game rules Game was played under FIBA rules. 2015 Supercup Winners SPM Shoeters Den Bosch; 2nd title
