= 2016 Dutch Basketball Supercup =

Sporting event

Donar	Shooters Den Bosch
88	51
- Date: 1 October 2016
- Venue: MartiniPlaza, Groningen

The 2016 Dutch Basketball Supercup was the 6th edition of the Dutch Basketball Supercup. The game was played between Shooters Den Bosch, the winner of the 2015–16 Dutch Basketball League, and Donar, the winner of the 2015–16 NBB Cup.

== Match details ==
1 October 2016	Donar	88–51	Shooters Den Bosch	Groningen
19:30 GMT+2	Scoring by quarter: 28-16, 13-15, 28-9, 19-11
	Pts: Pašalić 20; Rebs: Pašalić 9 Asts: Jeter 9	Boxscore	Pts: Lietmeijer 19; Rebs: De Vries 10; Asts: 4 players 2	Arena: MartiniPlaza; Attendance: 1,100

Donar	Den Bosch

2016 Supercup winner
Donar
(2nd title)
