= Sherron Dorsey-Walker =

American basketball player (born 1993)

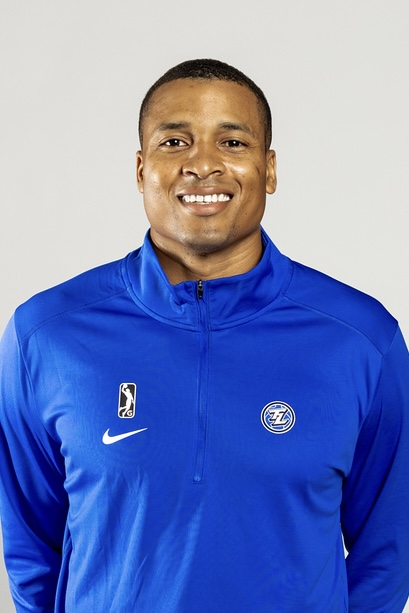
- Dorsey-Walker with Texas Legends, of the NBA G League and are affiliated with the Dallas Mavericks.

Texas Legends
- Title: Coaching associate
- League: NBA G League

Personal information
- Born: March 16, 1993 (age 33) Detroit, Michigan, U.S.
- Listed height: 1.95 m (6 ft 5 in)
- Listed weight: 91 kg (201 lb)

Career information
- High school: Pershing (Detroit, Michigan)
- College: Iowa State (2012–2015); Oakland (2015–2017)
- NBA draft: 2017: undrafted
- Playing career: 2017–2025
- Position: Shooting guard
- Coaching career: 2025–present

Career history

Playing
- 2017–2020: Landstede Hammers
- 2020–2021: Start Lublin
- 2021–2022: Wilki Morskie Szczecin
- 2022–2023: Start Lublin
- 2023: Sigortam.net Basketbol
- 2023–2025: Heroes Den Bosch

Coaching
- 2025-2026: Texas Legends (coaching associate)

Career highlights
- As player: MHSAA Class A State Champion (2009); Big 12 tournament champion (2014); Horizon League regular season (2017); 2× Dutch League champion (2019, 2025); 2× Dutch Supercup (2017, 2019); 2× Dutch Cup winner (2024, 2025); Dutch Cup MVP (2024)

Sherron Dorsey-Walker (born March 16, 1993) is an American professional basketball coach and former professional player who coached lastly for the Texas Legends, of the NBA G League and are affiliated with the Dallas Mavericks. He played college basketball for the Iowa State Cyclones and Oakland Golden Grizzlies. During his 8 year career in Europe, he played professionally in three countries: The Netherlands (BNXT League), Poland (PLK), and Turkey (TBL).

== High school career ==
Dorsey-Walker played basketball at Pershing High School in Detroit, Michigan. Three-year starter for Detroit Pershing. Garnered all-state first team honors as a senior, averaging 17.0 points, 6.7 rebounds and 3.4 assists per game in his final season. Named all-state honorable mention in sophomore and junior seasons. Helped team win a state title in his freshman season, playing alongside former MSU great and McDonalds All-American Keith Appling. Dorsey-Walker played with a list of Pershing standout including Kay Felder, Derrick Nix, Martez Walker, and Juwan Howard Jr. June 2012, Dorsey-Walker graduated as Pershing High School Class Valedictorian.

== College career ==
Spent his first two seasons at Iowa State, redshirting his first season. One of the top prospects out of Michigan. Rated No. 125 in the Rivals.com rankings and listed as the second-best player out of Michigan. Ranked as the 24th-best shooting guard in the Class of 2012.

2013–14 HIGHLIGHTS: Saw action in 20 games, scoring 1.2 points per game. Went 6-for-7 vs. UMKC (11/25), scoring a career-best 17 points. Tallied a career-high 2 steals vs. Auburn (12/2). Dorsey-Walker was a part of Iowa State 2013–14 Big 12 Conference Championship Team.

2014–15 HIGHLIGHTS: Transferred to Oakland in January. Played in 3 games for the Cyclones. Averaged 3.0 points and 1.3 rebounds per game – Went 1-for-2 vs. Oakland (11/14) in 18 minutes.

2015–16 HIGHLIGHTS: Played in all 35 games, making 29 starts. Averaged 6.5 points and 5.0 rebounds per game. Ranked 16th in the Horizon League in rebounds. Tallied 10 games of double-digit points and five games of double-figure rebounds. Third on the team in rebounds and assists. Began the season with back-to-back double-doubles against Eastern Michigan and Colorado State. Scored career-high 19 points in season opener against EMU. Grabbed career-best 16 rebounds vs. Alcorn State. Scored 14 points in win at Detroit.

2016–17 HIGHLIGHTS: CoSIDA Academic All-District Team. Named a 2017 AllState Good Works Team nominee. Started all 34 games for the Black and Gold. Averaged 13.4 points and 8.0 rebounds per game. Led the team in assists (129). A league-leader in a number of statistical categories in Horizon League play including scoring (13th, 14.4), free throw percentage (11th, .774), rebounding (T18th, 5.6), assists (8th, 3.6), steals (T10th, 1.2 spg), 3-point field goals, assist/turnover ratio (8th, 1.3) and minutes per game (6th, 34.4)

ACADEMIC HONORS: Academic All-Big 12 Second Team (2014), Big 12 Commissioner's Honor Roll (2014), and Four-time Horizon League Academic Honor Roll (2015–17).

== Professional career ==
Dorsey-Walker started his professional with Landstede Hammers where he signed in July 2017. In his rookie 2017–18 season, Dorsey-Walker averaged 11.8 points per game. At the beginning of the season, he won the Dutch Basketball Supercup with Landstede which was its first trophy in club history.

In the 2018–19 season, Dorsey-Walker won his first Dutch Basketball League (DBL) championship with Landstede, which was as well the club's first ever title. Over 47 games in the season, he averaged 13.6 points per game.

At the beginning of the 2019–20 season, Dorsey-Walker and Landstede won their second Supercup title. He played in the 2019–20 FIBA Europe Cup with Landstede, where he averaged 16.7 points and 4 rebounds in twelve games.

On July 21, 2020, he has signed with Start Lublin of the Polish Basketball League.

On May 21, 2021, he has signed with Wilki Morskie Szczecin of the PLK.

On July 6, 2022, he signed with Start Lublin of the Polish Basketball League and returned to the club after one year of separation.

On January 4, 2023, he signed with Sigortam.net Basketbol of the TBL.

On October 19, 2023, he signed with Heroes Den Bosch of the BNXT League.

On March 24, 2024, Dorsey-Walker won the Dutch Cup with Den Bosch after his 18-point performance in the final.

On July 19, 2024, he signed an extension with Heroes Den Bosch of the BNXT League.

On March 23, 2025, Dorsey-Walker and Heroes won the Dutch Cup for a second consecutive year.

On June 6, 2025, Dorsey-Walker won his second Dutch Basketball League (DBL) championship with Heroes Den Bosch, helping the club win their 18th nation championship.

On July 15, 2025, Dorsey-Walker announced his retirement from basketball. He played college basketball for the Iowa State Cyclones and Oakland Golden Grizzlies. During his 8 year career in Europe, he played professionally in three countries: The Netherlands (BNXT League), Poland (PLK), and Turkey (TBL).

== Coaching career ==
=== Texas Legends (2025) ===
In July 2025, Dorsey-Walker joined the Texas Legends coaching staff of the NBA G League and are affiliated with the Dallas Mavericks as a coaching associate.

== Honours ==
=== Club ===
Heroes Den Bosch

- Dutch Basketball League: 2024–25
- Dutch Basketball Cup: 2024, 2025

Landstede Hammers

- Dutch Basketball League: 2018–19
- Dutch Supercup: 2017, 2019
