= Roeland Schaftenaar =

Dutch basketball player

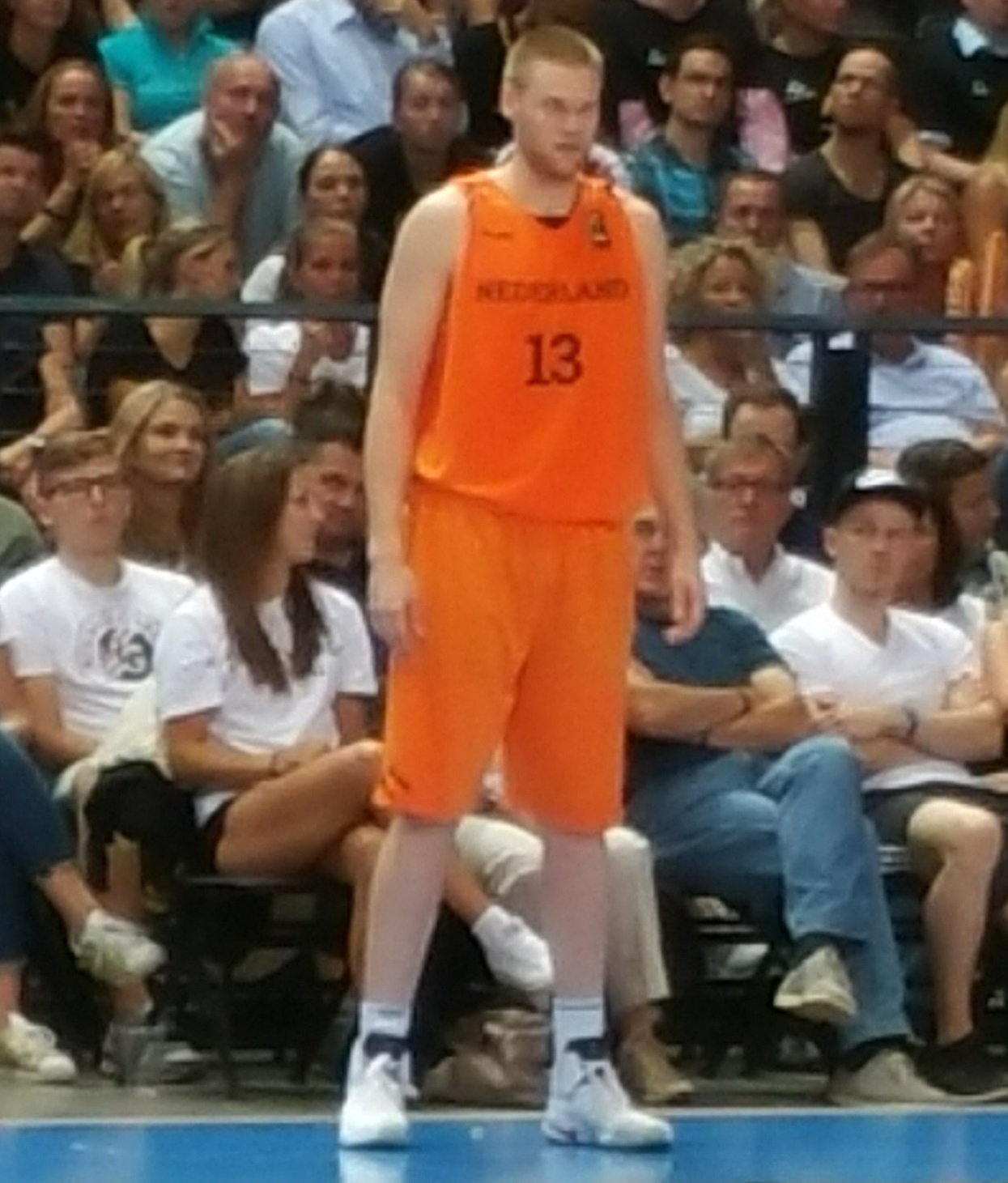
- Schaftenaar playing for the Netherlands in 2016

Personal information
- Born: 29 July 1988 (age 38) Utrecht, Netherlands
- Listed height: 6 ft 11 in (2.11 m)
- Listed weight: 240 lb (109 kg)

Career information
- College: Oregon State (2006–2010)
- NBA draft: 2010: undrafted
- Playing career: 2010–2026
- Position: Center / power forward
- Number: 10, 13

Career history
- 2010–2012: La Palma
- 2012–2014: Breogán
- 2014–2017: Rethymno Cretan Kings
- 2017–2018: Faros Larissas
- 2018–2020: Ionikos Nikaias
- 2020–2021: Cáceres
- 2021–2022: Básquet Coruña
- 2022–2026: ZZ Leiden

Career highlights
- BNXT League champion (2023); 2× Dutch League champion (2023, 2024); Dutch Cup winner (2023); Dutch Supercup winner (2023); Greek 2nd Division champion (2019); 2× All-Pac-12 Honorable mention (2009, 2010); College Basketball Invitational MVP (2009)

Roeland Pieter Schaftenaar (born 29 July 1988) is a Dutch former professional basketball player. He was also a member of the Netherlands national basketball team. Standing at 2.11 m (6 ft 11 in), he played as power forward. His brother Olaf Schaftenaar also plays professional basketball.

== Early life ==
Schaftenaar was born in Utrecht.

== College career ==
Scaftenaar played NCAA Division I college basketball at Oregon State, from 2006 to 2010.

== Professional career ==
Schaftenaar started his pro career by playing four years in the LEB Oro league, the Spanish second division.

On 11 October 2014 he signed with the Greek Basket League club Rethymno. On 24 January 2015 he extended his contract with the club for another two years. After temporarily leaving the team after the first 4 games of the 2016–17 season, he returned to Rethymno on 23 January 2017, in order to replace Brandon Edwards.

On 12 September 2017 he joined Faros Larissas of the Greek Basket League.

On 14 September 2021, Schaftenaar signed with Básquet Coruña, staying in the Spanish Leb Oro.

On 11 September 2022, Schaftenaar signed a one-year contract for ZZ Leiden, his first professional team in his native Netherlands.

In June 2026, he decided to retire from professional basketball.

== National team career ==
Schaftenaar is a member of the senior Dutch national basketball team. With the senior Dutch team, he played at the EuroBasket 2015 tournament as a starter.

== Personal life ==
Schaftenaar is the older brother of fellow Oregon State alum, and professional basketball player, Olaf Schaftenaar.

== Statistics ==
Season	Team	League	GP	MPG	PPG	RPG	APG	EFF
2013–14	CB Breogán	LEB Oro	25	25.9	10.3	6.1	2.0	14.0
2014–15	Rethymno	GBL	20	25.2	12.3	6.6	1.5	15.7
2015–16	Rethymno	GBL	26	22.6	8.3	5.2	1.8	12.5
2016–17	Rethymno	GBL	20	16.5	5.6	3.7	1.1	8.3

Source: FIBA.com
