= DeJuan Wright =

American basketball player (born 1988)

Personal information
- Born: December 7, 1988 (age 37) Detroit, Michigan, U.S.
- Listed height: 6 ft 3 in (1.91 m)

Career information
- High school: Henry Ford (Detroit, Michigan)
- College: Ferris State (2007–2008); Gillette College (2009–2010); FIU (2010–2012)
- NBA draft: 2012: undrafted
- Playing career: 2012–2021
- Position: Shooting guard

Career history
- 2012–2013: EiffelTowers Den Bosch
- 2013: Orchies
- 2014: ZZ Leiden
- 2014–2015: Donar
- 2015–2017: WBC Raiffeisen Wels
- 2017–2021: Kutaisi 2010

Career highlights
- 2× Georgian Cup champion (2018, 2021); Georgian Supercup champion (2018); 2× Dutch Cup champion (2013, 2015); DBL All-Star (2013); DBL Dunk contest winner (2013)

DeJuan Wright (born December 7, 1988) is an American former professional basketball player for Kutaisi 2010 of the Georgian Superliga. Wright usually plays the shooting guard position.

From Detroit, Wright attended Henry Ford High School and Florida International University.

== Career ==
In the 2012–2013 season, Wright played for EiffelTowers Den Bosch in the Netherlands. On September 27, 2013 Wright signed with BC Orchies in the LNB Pro B, the second league in France. He averaged 14.3 points and 5 rebounds for Orchies. Wright returned to the Netherlands on January 31, 2014 when he signed with Zorg en Zekerheid Leiden.

For the 2014–15 season Wright signed in the Netherlands again, this time for Donar from Groningen. On 12 March 2015, Wright was ruled out for the season after he tore his achilles. He averaged 15.5 points per game till his injury.

In October 2015, he signed in Austria with WBC Raiffeisen Wels.

In the summer of 2017, Wright signed with BC Kutaisi 2010 in Georgia. He played four years with Kutaisi, and won two Georgian Cups and one Georgian Supercup with team.

== Honors ==
=== Club ===
EiffelTowers Den Bosch

- NBB Cup (1): 2012–13

Donar

- NBB Cup (1): 2014–15
- Dutch Supercup (1): 2014

Kutaisi 2010

- Georgian Cup (2): 2017–18, 2020–21
- Georgian Supercup: 2018

=== Individual ===
- DBL All-Star (1): 2013
- DBL Dunk contest winner (1): 2013
