= 2011 Dutch Basketball Supercup =

ZZ Leiden	GasTerra Flames
67	60
- Date: 24 September 2011
- Venue: Nieuw Welgelegen, Utrecht

The 2011 Dutch Basketball Supercup was the inaugural game of the Dutch Basketball Supercup. The game was played between ZZ Leiden, the winner of the 2010–11 Dutch Basketball League, and GasTerra Flames, the winner of the 2010–11 NBB Cup.

== Match details ==
24 September 2011	Zorg en Zekerheid Leiden	67–60	GasTerra Flames	Utrecht
15:00 GMT+2	Scoring by quarter: 8-17, 9-9, 27-13, 13-28
	Pts: Boxley 15; Rebs: Boxley 10; Asts: Boxley 3		Pts: Dourisseau 14; Rebs: Wyatt, Dourisseau 8 Asts: Bell 6	Arena: Nieuw Welgelegen

ZZ Leiden	Flames

2011 Supercup winner
ZZ Leiden
(1st title)
