= Vernon Taylor (basketball) =

American basketball player

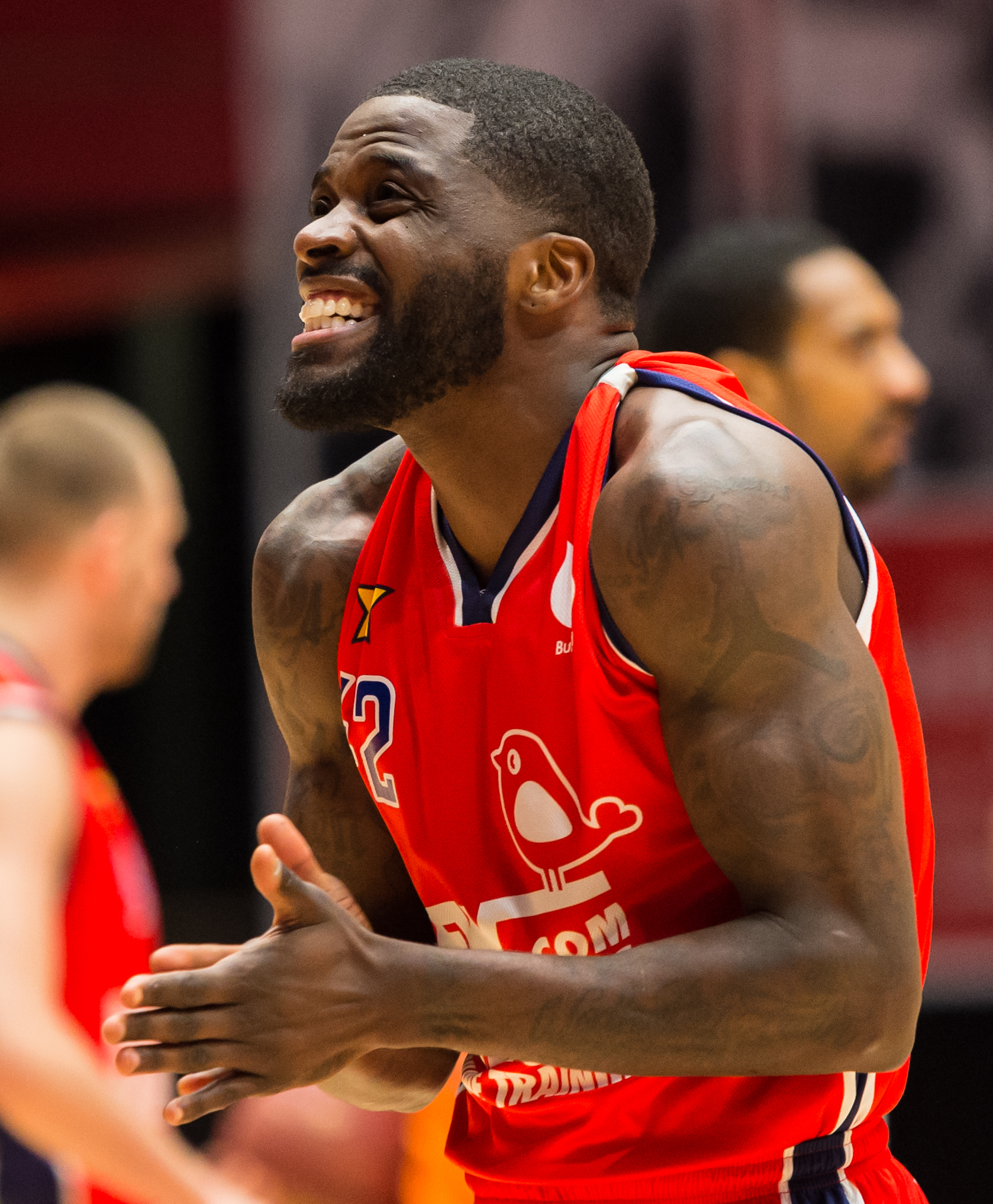
- Taylor with Den Bosch in 2019

Personal information
- Born: February 15, 1987 (age 39) Cross, South Carolina, U.S.
- Listed height: 6 ft 3 in (1.91 m)
- Listed weight: 187 lb (85 kg)

Career information
- High school: Cross (Cross, South Carolina)
- College: Spartanburg Methodist (2007–2009); Troy (2009–2011)
- NBA draft: 2011: undrafted
- Playing career: 2011–2023
- Position: Shooting guard / point guard
- Number: 2, 42

Career history
- 2011: Säynätsalon Riento
- 2011–2012: Sagesse
- 2012–2013: Porvoon Tarmo
- 2013: Kouvot
- 2013–2015: Rilski Sportist
- 2015–2016: Kangoeroes Willebroek
- 2016–2018: Okapi Aalstar
- 2018: Trefl Sopot
- 2018–2019: New Heroes Den Bosch
- 2019: Keravnos
- 2019–2020: Donar
- 2020–2021: Union Neuchâtel
- 2021–2022: SAM Massagno
- 2022–2023: Donar

Vernon Taylor (born February 15, 1987) is an American former basketball player. Standing at 6 ft 3 in (1.91 m), he played as point guard or shooting guard. Following a college career with Spartanburg Methodist and Troy, Taylor played 12 years of professional basketball in Europe. Countries in which he played include Bulgaria, Finland, Poland, Switzerland, Netherlands and Belgium.

== Early life and college career ==
Taylor was born in Cross, South Carolina, a community close to Charleston. He had described Cross as a very "family-oriented" and "hard-working" community. His favorite player was Michael Jordan growing up.

He played for the junior college Spartanburg Methodist starting from 2007, and later joined the Troy Trojans. He won the Sun Belt Conference in 2010.

== Career ==
Taylor started his professional career in Finland with Säynätsalon Riento in 2011.

He joined Sageses in Lebanon in 2011, but was released after playing just one game.

In 2015, Taylor signed with Kangoeroes Willebroek of the Belgian Pro Basketball League (PBL). He was named the MVP of Round 18 after having an index rating of 28 in a win against Liège Basket.

He signed for Okapi Aalstar in Belgium in 2016. Okapi re-signed him for the 2017–18 season.

Taylor started the 2018–19 season with Trefl Sopot in the Polish Basketball League (PLK). On 8 January 2019, he agreed with Sopot to leave the club. Late that month, Taylor signed with New Heroes Den Bosch which was looking for a replacement for injured Devon Van Oostrum.

In July 2019, he signed with Cypriotic team Keravnos.

On October 15, 2019, Taylor signed with Donar of the Dutch Basketball League (DBL) for the remainder of the 2019–20 season. The 2019–20 season was cancelled prematurely in March because of the COVID-19 pandemic. Taylor returned to the United States.

On July 6, 2020, Taylor signed in Switzerland with Union Neuchâtel of the Swiss Basketball League (SBL).

In August 2021, Taylor transferred to SAM Basket Massagno.

On August 8, 2022, Taylor returned to Donar by signing a one-year contract. He announced his retirement in October 2023.

== Personal ==
In 2023, Taylor organised the Love is Love PRO AM basketball tournament in Charleston. He wore number 42 in his final season to honour his best friend, Timothy Lee Owens, who died in 2022.
