= Sean Cunningham (basketball) =

American-Dutch basketball player

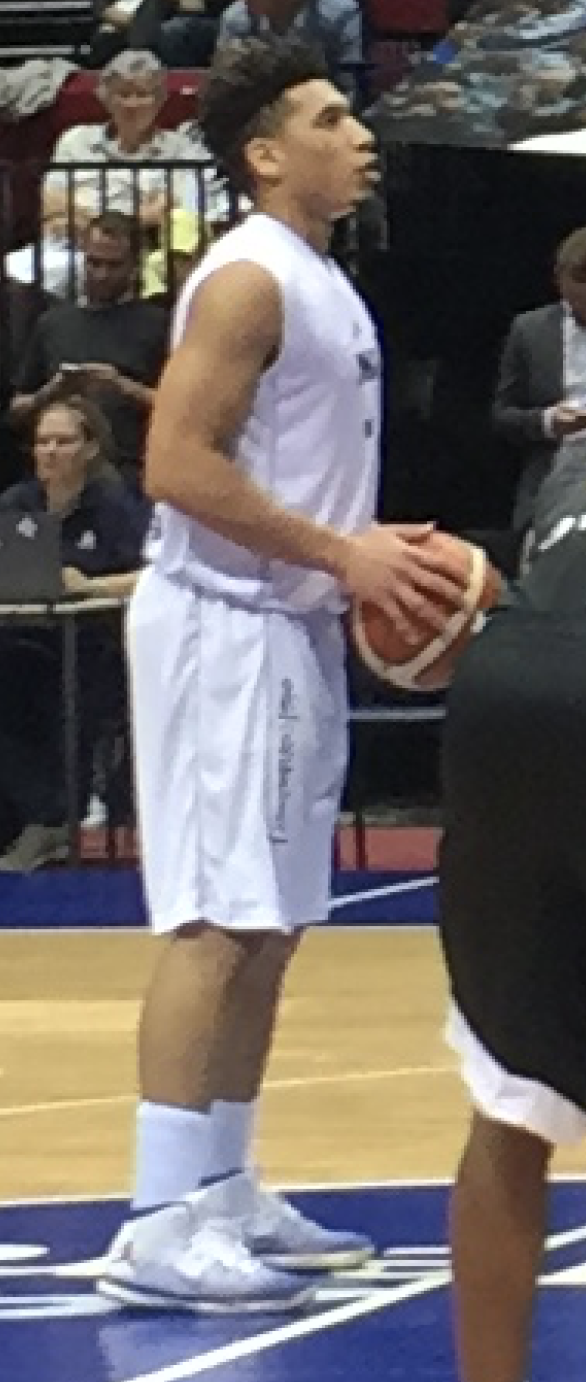
- Cunningham with Donar in 2016

Free agent
- Position: Point guard / shooting guard

Personal information
- Born: December 20, 1986 (age 39) Los Angeles, California, U.S.
- Listed height: 1.88 m (6 ft 2 in)
- Listed weight: 88 kg (194 lb)

Career information
- High school: Daniel Murphy (Los Angeles, California)
- College: UC Riverside (2005–2010)
- NBA draft: 2010: undrafted
- Playing career: 2010–present

Career history
- 2010–2011: Tindastóll
- 2011–2014: ZZ Leiden
- 2014–2019: Donar

Career highlights
- 4× DBL champion (2013, 2016–2018); 4× Dutch Cup champion (2012, 2015, 2017, 2018); 5× Dutch Supercup champion (2011, 2012, 2014, 2016, 2018); 2× DBL All-Star (2014–2015); DBL Defensive Player of the Year (2018); 2× DBL All-Defense Team (2017, 2018)

Sean Kingsley Cunningham (born December 20, 1986) is an American-Dutch professional basketball player. Cunningham usually plays the point guard or shooting guard position. He is a former member of the Dutch national basketball team.

== Career ==
Cunningham started his professional career with Tindastóll in 2010, where he averaged 15.5 points and 4.9 assists in 17 Úrvalsdeild karla games. In 2011, he signed with ZZ Leiden of the Dutch Basketball League (DBL). In the 2012–13 season, he won his first DBL championship after beating Aris Leeuwarden 4–0 in the finals.

In 2014, Cunningham transferred to DBL side Donar, after winning one DBL championship and one Dutch Cup title with Leiden. In 2016, he won his first DBL title with Donar. In the 2017–18 season, Cunningham was named the DBL Defensive Player of the Year.

== National team career ==
Although born in the United States, Cunningham has been a Dutch citizen since birth. In 2013, two of Netherlands' national team wins in the EuroBasket 2015 qualification where voided as FIBA counted him and Mohamed Kherrazi as naturalized players. Both players appeared in both the games and under FIBA rules only one naturalized player could be on the roster for any given game.

== Personal life ==
Cunningham was born and raised in Los Angeles to a Dutch mother and American father, retired Los Angeles Councilman, David Cunningham Jr. His father died in November 2017, at the age of 82. After Donar's third national championship in a row in May 2018, Cunningham dedicated the victory to his father.
