= Nigel van Oostrum =

British-Dutch basketball player (born 1990)

Personal information
- Born: 19 September 1990 (age 36) Houston, Texas, U.S.
- Listed height: 6 ft 5 in (1.96 m)
- Listed weight: 190 lb (86 kg)

Career information
- College: Franklin Pierce (2009–2012)
- NBA draft: 2012: undrafted
- Playing career: 2014–2024
- Position: Point guard / shooting guard

Career history
- 2014: Den Helder Kings
- 2014–2016: Aris Leeuwarden
- 2016–2022: Landstede Hammers

Career highlights
- DBL champion (2019); Dutch Supercup winner (2017); DBL assists leader (2016); DBL All-Rookie Team (2015); No. 7 retired by Landstede Hammers

Nigel Luuk van Oostrum (born 19 September 1990) is a British-Dutch former professional basketball player who last played for Landstede Hammers of the BNXT League.

== College career ==
Van Oostrum played college basketball with the Franklin Pierce Ravens in the NCAA Division II.

== Professional career ==
Van Oostrum started his professional career with Den Helder Kings of the Dutch Basketball League (DBL). When that club was dissolved in December 2014, he signed with Aris Leeuwarden.

In July 2016, Van Oostrum joined Landstede Basketbal. On 5 October 2017, he won his first trophy with Landstede after the club won the Dutch Basketball Supercup. In the 2018–19 season, Van Oostrum was the captain of the Landstede team that won the club's first national championship. In the following 2019–20 season, he played together with his brother Devon van Oostrum on the Hammers.

In 2022, Van Oostrum was diagnosed to have a brain tumor and underwent surgery.

On 30 April 2022, Van Oostrum's number 7 was retired by the Hammers.

== International career ==
Van Oostrum played for the England national basketball team at the U18 European Championship for Men.

== Personal ==
Van Oostrum is the son of Duco van Oostrum, who played basketball at Ymir, the precursor of Aris Leeuwarden and since 1995 teaches at Sheffield University. Nigel is the older brother of Devon and Sam, both professional players as well. He is of Indonesian descent through his mother.
