= Toon van Helfteren =

Dutch basketball player and coach

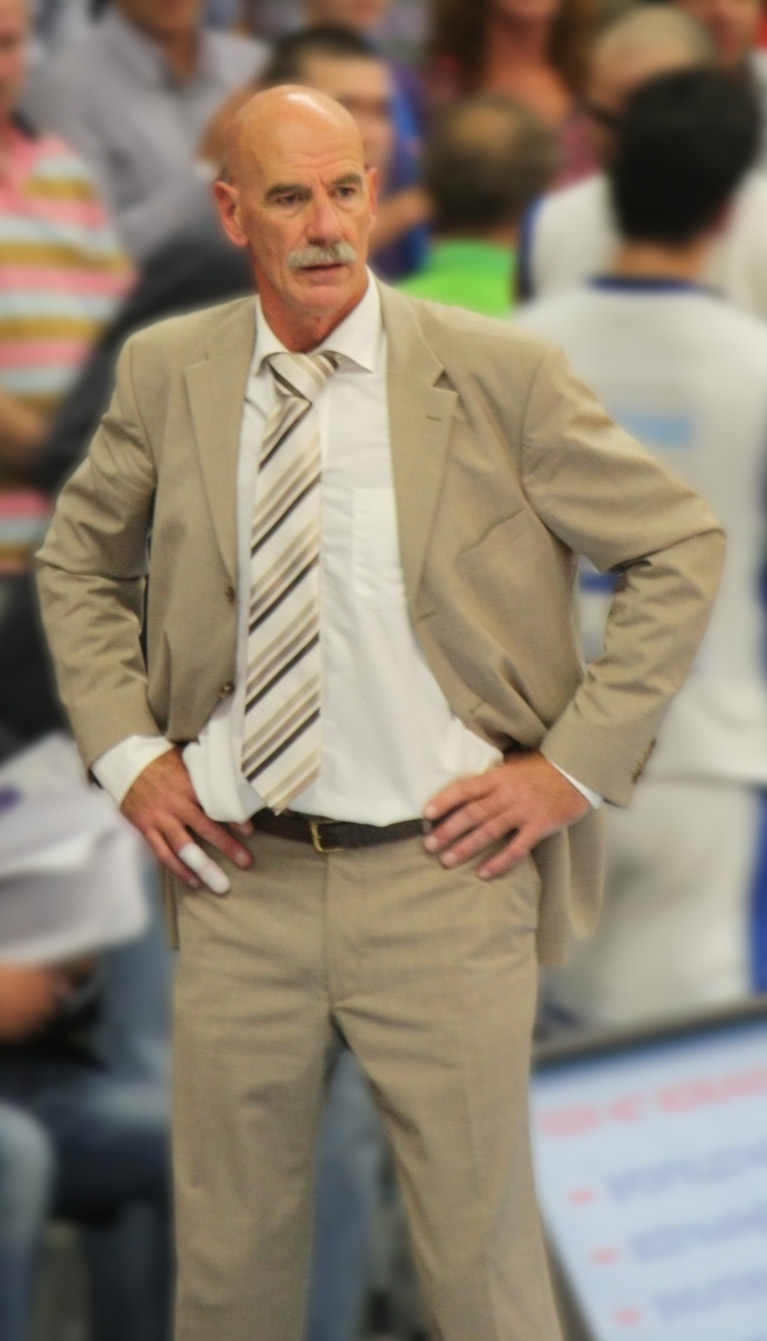
- Van Helfteren in 2011

Personal information
- Born: 20 February 1951 (age 75) Tilburg, Netherlands
- Listed height: 2.01 m (6 ft 7 in)

Career information
- Playing career: 1971–1983
- Position: Head coach
- Coaching career: 1990–present

Career history

Playing
- 1971–1983: Punch Delft
- 1983–1986: Elmex Leiden
- 1986–1990: DAS Delft

Coaching
- 1990–1992: DAS Delft
- 1997–1998: EBBC Den Bosch
- 1999-2000: DAS Delft U22
- 2000–2001: Virtus Werkendam
- 2001–2005: EBBC Den Bosch
- 2005–2006: Amsterdam Astronauts
- 2007–2008: Rotterdam
- 2008–2014: ZZ Leiden
- 2013–2019: Netherlands
- 2019–2023: Feyenoord

Career highlights
- As player: DBL champion (1975); DBL Most Valuable Player (1986); 2× DBL All-Defense Team (1975, 1980); 2× Dutch Cup champion (1974, 1978); 6× DBL All-Star (1976, 1979, 1981, 1982, 1987, 1988); As coach: 2× DBL champion (2011, 2013); 2× Dutch Cup champion (2010, 2012); 2× Dutch Supercup champion (2011, 2012); 4× DBL Coach of the Year (2003, 2010–2012)

Anton J. J. "Toon" van Helfteren (born 20 February 1951) is a Dutch former basketball player and current coach. Van Helfteren played in the Dutch Basketball League from 1971 till 1990. He was the coach of ZZ Leiden from 2008 till 2014. He also was the coach of the Dutch national basketball team for six years, starting in 2013 and ending in 2019.

== Professional career ==
A product of BC Paulus Tilburg in his hometown, he joined Punch Delft in 1971. Van Helfteren played 19 seasons in the Dutch Eredivisie from 1971 till 1990. Between 1983 and 1986 van Helfteren was a member of Elmex Leiden, from 1986 to 1990 for DAS Delft. In 1986 Van Helfteren won the Dutch MVP award.

== National team career ==
Van Helfteren played 207 games for the Dutch national basketball team, which makes him the all-time leader in games played for the Netherlands. He debuted on 12 December 1971, against Czechoslovakia in Bremerhaven.

== Coaching career ==
In 2008, Van Helfteren became the coach of Zorg en Zekerheid Leiden. With Leiden, Van Helfteren won the Dutch national championship twice: in 2011 and 2013. He has also won the DBL Coach of the Year award three times when he was with ZZ, in 2010, 2011 and 2012. After the 2013–14 season Van Helfteren left the team, which he won six trophies with.

On 15 April 2019, Feyenoord Basketball announced van Helfteren had signed a two-year contract with the team starting from the 2019–20 season. On 10 June 2022, van Helfteren and Feyenoord extended his contract for one more season.

On 21 April 2023, Feyenoord released Van Helfteren of his duties after a negative streak in the second half of the season.

=== National team ===
Van Helfteren was the head coach of the Netherlands national men's team three stints, from 1993 to 1997, from 2013 to 2015 and from 2015 to 2019. He guided the Netherlands to the EuroBasket 2017, the country's first appearance since 1987 (30 years before).

== Personal ==
In April 2019, Van Helfteren was knighted into the Order of Orange-Nassau for his services for Dutch basketball. He lives in Delft.
