= Noah Dahlman =

American basketball player (born 1989)

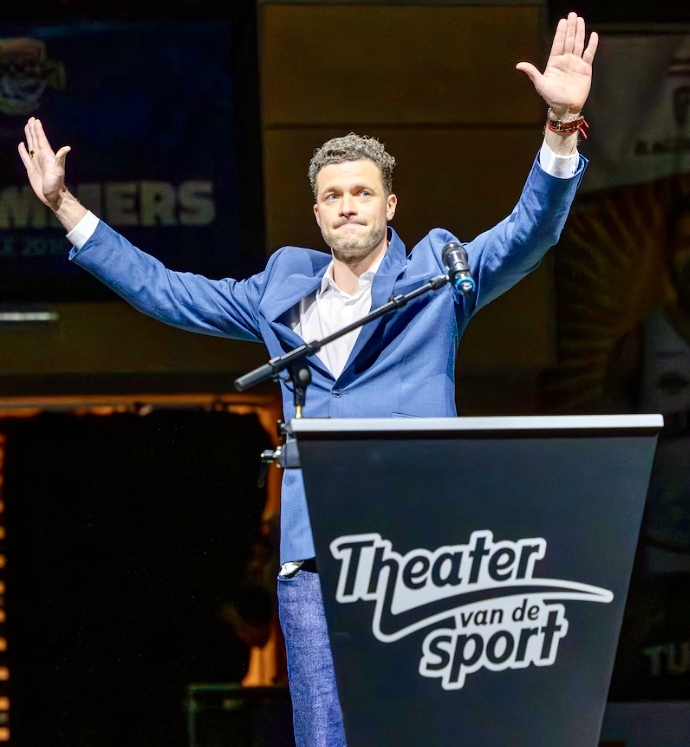
- Dahlman in 2025

Free agent
- Position: Forward

Personal information
- Born: April 4, 1989 (age 37) Braham, Minnesota, U.S.
- Listed height: 6 ft 7 in (2.01 m)
- Listed weight: 220 lb (100 kg)

Career information
- High school: Braham Area (Braham, Minnesota)
- College: Wofford (2007–2011)
- NBA draft: 2011: undrafted
- Playing career: 2011–2025

Career history
- 2011–2012: MZT Skopje
- 2012–2013: BKP Banská Bystrica
- 2013: MZT Skopje
- 2013–2014: Balkan Botevgrad
- 2014–2015: Lietkabelis
- 2015–2016: Dinamo București
- 2016–2017: Peja
- 2017–2022: Landstede Hammers
- 2022–2024: Gifu Swoops

Career highlights
- No. 42 retired by Landstede Hammers (2025); DBL champion (2019); 2× All-DBL Team (2018, 2019); Dutch Supercup winner (2017); Balkan League Player of the Year (2014); Bulgarian League MVP (2014); 2x Macedonian League champion (2012, 2013); Macedonian Cup winner (2012); Honorable Mention All-American – AP (2010); SoCon Player of the Year – Coaches (2010)

Noah Dahlman (born April 4, 1989) is an American retired professional basketball player who last played for the Gifu Swoops of the Japanese B.League. He played college basketball at Wofford College, where he was an All-American.

== College career ==
Dahlman came to Wofford from Braham, Minnesota, where he led Braham Area High School to three state championships. A 6'7" forward, Dahlman became one of the best players in Terrier history. For his career, he scored 2,013 points – most in Wofford's Division I history. He was a three-time first team Southern Conference pick and was named Southern Conference Player of the Year by the league's coaches as a junior in the 2009–10 season. Dahlman was also named an honorable mention All-American by the Associated Press that season.

Dahlman also led the Terriers to unprecedented team success. He was two-time Southern Conference tournament Most Valuable Player (2010, 2011) as Wofford gained its first two NCAA tournament bids in school history.

== Professional career ==
=== First years ===
After graduating from Wofford in 2011, Dahlman was not selected in the 2011 NBA draft. He instead signed with MZT Skopje of the Macedonian First League for the 2011–12 season. In his first professional season, he helped guide his team to a Macedonian National Championship. He was named Forward of the Year and to the All-Macedonian League First Team. In July 2013, he signed with Bulgarian team Balkan Botevgrad.

In the 2014–15 season he played with Lithuanian club Lietkabelis of the Lietuvos krepšinio lyga (LKL).

In June 2015, Dahlman signed with Dinamo București of Romania.

In 2016, he signed with KB Peja of the Kosovo Basketball Superleague.

=== Landstede Hammers ===
On July 3, 2017, Dahlman signed with Landstede Basketbal. On April 23, 2018, Dahlman was named to the All-DBL Team. Over 30 regular season games, he averaged 16.8 points and 6.2 rebounds per game. In the play-offs, second-seeded Landstede lost to third-seeded ZZ Leiden in the semi-finals, 0–4. In 4 playoff games, Dahlman averaged 13.5 points, 8.5 rebounds and 2.3 assists. On July 31, 2018, Dahlman re-signed for another season with Landstede.

In the 2018–19 season, Dahlman won the DBL championship with Landstede, the first in club history. He was also named to the All-DBL Team for a second straight year. On June 20, 2019, Dahlman extended his contract with Landstede. During the 2020–21 season, he averaged 15.5 points and 4.9 rebounds per game. Dahlman extended his contract with the team by two years on July 5, 2021. In the 2021–22 season, Dahlman led the BNXT League in efficiency rankings with an average score of 25.2 per game.

=== Gifu Swoops ===
In June 2022, Dahlman agreed with Landstede to dissolve his contract early as he signed with Japanese club Gifu Swoops of the B.League.

== Personal ==
Dahlman is the grandson of Naismith Memorial Basketball Hall of Fame coach John Kundla. His brother Isaiah played collegiately for Michigan State.

Dahlman operates youth basketball camps which also incorporate life skills.
