= Herman van den Belt =

Dutch basketball coach (born 1970)

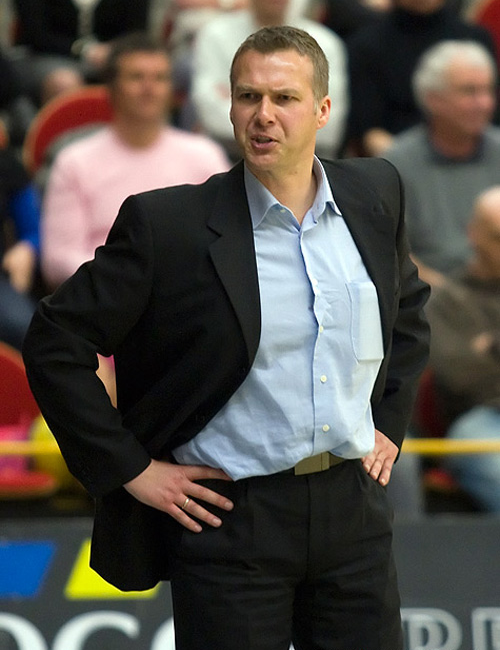
- Van den Belt coaching Landstede in 2010

Personal information
- Born: 1 January 1970 (age 56) Rijssen, Netherlands
- Coaching career: 1996–present

Career history

Coaching
- 1996–2000: Landstede Zwolle (assistant)
- 2000–2009: Landstede Zwolle
- 2009–2010: West-Brabant Giants (assistant)
- 2009–2023: Landstede Zwolle / Hammers

Career highlights
- DBL champion (2019); Dutch Supercup winner (2017); 3× DBL Coach of the Year (2002, 2005, 2016)

Herman van den Belt (born 1 January 1970) is a Dutch professional basketball coach, most known for his 25 years coaching Landstede Hammers of the Dutch Basketball League (DBL).

Starting from 1996, van den Belt has been the head coach of Landstede Hammers. The only exception was the 2009–10 season, in which he was an assistant-coach of West-Brabant Giants. In 2019, he won his first DBL championship with Zwolle.

During the 2022–23 season, on 7 March 2023, Hammers and Van den Belt parted ways after 25 years with the club.

== Honours ==
Landstede

- Dutch Basketball League: 2018–19
- Dutch Supercup: 2017
- DBL Coach of the Year (3): 2001–02, 2004–05, 2015–16
