= 2014–15 NBB Cup =

NBB Cup
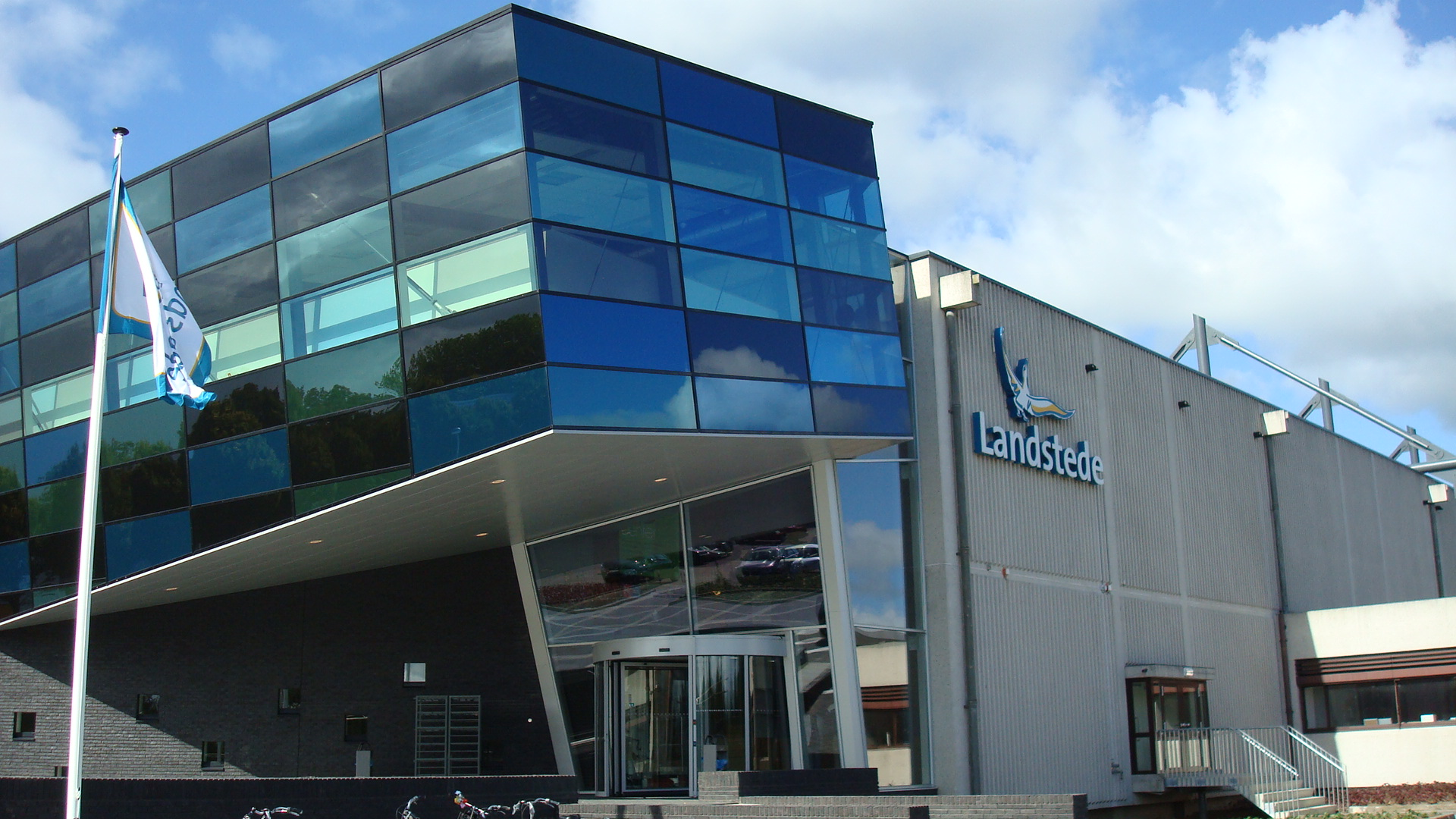
- Landstede Sportcentrum hosted the Final
- Teams: 48 (All rounds)

Finals
- Champions: Donar; 4th title
- Runners-up: SPM Shoeters Den Bosch
- Semi-finalists: ZZ Leiden; Landstede

The 2014–15 NBB Cup was the 47th season of the annual cup tournament in the Netherlands. Donar was the defending champion.

The Final was played in the Landstede Sportcentrum in Zwolle on 29 March 2015. Donar defeated SPM Shoeters Den Bosch 70–78 in the championship game.

== Format ==
In the first, second and third round teams from the Dutch second, third and fourth division participate. From the fourth round, teams from the Dutch Basketball League (DBL) enter the competition. Quarter- and semi-finals are played in a two-legged format. When a team form a tier lower than the DBL played a DBL team, one win is sufficient for the latter to advance to the next round.

== Bracket ==
Note: When a DBL-team played a team from any lower division, a win in the first leg was enough to qualify for the next round.

Quarter-finals
1	Rotterdam	61	75	136
8	Donar	91	90	180
4	Cangeroes Utrecht	45	–	45
5	ZZ Leiden	87	–	87
2	Landstede	88	–	88
7	Aarnoudse Binnenland	43	–	43
3	BSW	45	45	96
6	SPM Shoeters	86	88	172

Semi-Finals
Donar	78	85	163
ZZ Leiden	79	80	159
Landstede	60	66	126
SPM Shoeters	63	81	144

Final
Donar	78
SPM Shoeters	70

== Fourth round ==
Team 1	Score	Team 2
Challenge Sports Rotterdam	86–77	Apollo Amsterdam
De Groene Uilen	47–96	Donar
Cangeroes Utrecht	20–0 (Note: Because Den Helder Kings was declared bankrupt in December 2014, Cangeroes was given an automatic bye.)	Den Helder Kings
Challenge Sports Rotterdam 2	57–80	ZZ Leiden
Red Giants	77–90	Landstede
Binnenland	20–0 (Note: Before the start of the 2014–15 season, it was announced that Magixx was dissolved. However, the draw of the NBB Cup had already been held which gave CBV Binnenland an automatic bye to the quarterfinals.)	Magixx
Grasshoppers	81–89	BSW
SPM Shoeters Den Bosch	104–64	Aris Leeuwarden

== Quarterfinals ==
Team 1	Agg.	Team 2	1st leg	2nd leg
Challenge Sports Rotterdam	136–180	Donar	61–91	75–90
Cangeroes Utrecht	45–87	Zorg en Zekerheid Leiden	45–87	–
Landstede	88–43	Aarnoudse Binnenland	88–43	–
BSW Weert	96–172	SPM Shoeters Den Bosch	45–86	45–88

== Semifinals ==
Team 1	Agg.	Team 2	1st leg	2nd leg
Donar	163–159	Zorg en Zekerheid Leiden	78–79	85–80
Landstede	126–144	SPM Shoeters Den Bosch	60–63	66–81

== Final ==
29 March 2015	SPM Shoeters Den Bosch	70–78	Donar	Zwolle
15:30	Scoring by quarter: 20–21, 17–16, 15–13, 18–28
RTV Noord, NOS	Pts: Denson 22; Rebs: Johnson 15; Asts: Curry 7	Report	Pts: Jeter 21; Rebs: Three players 5 Asts: Jeter, Cunningham 4	Arena: Landstede Sportcentrum; Attendance: 1,500

Shoeters	Donar
