= 2013 Dutch Basketball Supercup =

ZZ Leiden	SPM Shoeters Den Bosch
47	68
- Date: 29 September 2013
- Venue: Vijf Meihal, Leiden

The 2013 Dutch Basketball Super cup was the 3rd edition of the Dutch Basketball Super cup. The game was played between ZZ Leiden, the winner of the 2012–13 Dutch Basketball League, and SPM Shoeters Den Bosch, the winner of the 2012–13 NBB Cup.

== Match details ==
29 September 2013	Zorg en Zekerheid Leiden	47–68	SPM Shoeters Den Bosch	Leiden
15:00 GMT+2	Scoring by quarter: 16-17, 12-15, 11-17, 8-19
	Pts: Duinker 15; Rebs: Duinker 6 Asts: de Jong 6		Pts: Akerboom 17; Rebs: Wessels 7 Asts: Wesley 7	Arena: Vijf Meihal; Attendance: 1,500

Leiden	Den Bosch

2014 Supercup winner
SPM Shoeters Den Bosch
(1st title)
