= Drago Pašalić =

Croatian basketball player

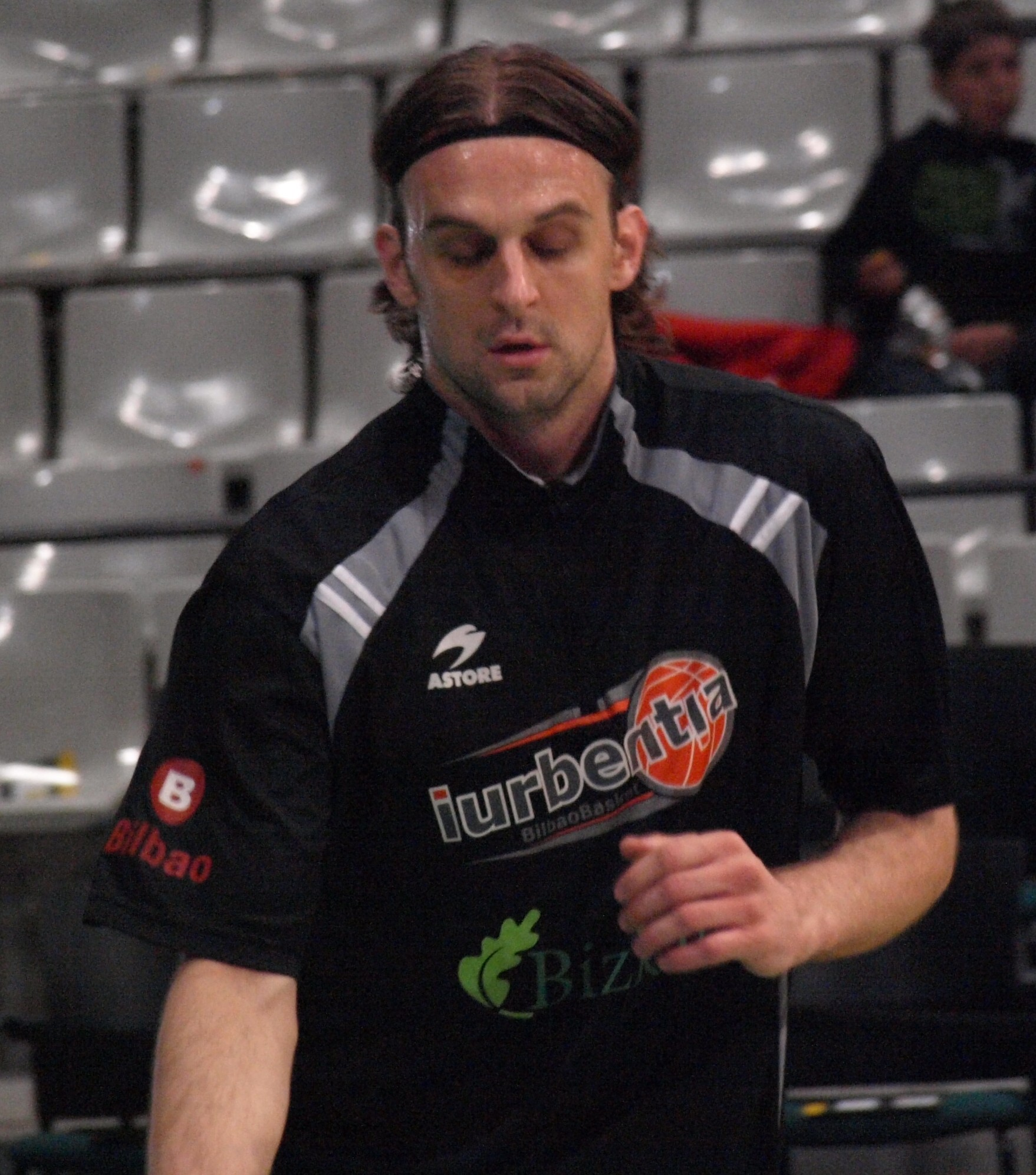
- Pašalić with Bilbao Basket, in 2009.

Donar
- Title: Technical director
- League: BNXT League

Personal information
- Born: June 23, 1984 (age 42) Split, SR Croatia, SFR Yugoslavia
- Listed height: 2.08 m (6 ft 10 in)
- Listed weight: 107 kg (236 lb)

Career information
- NBA draft: 2005: undrafted
- Playing career: 2000–2020
- Position: Power forward / center
- Number: 33

Career history
- 2000–2005: Split
- 2001–2002: →Solin
- 2005: Ülkerspor
- 2006–2007: PAOK
- 2007–2009: Bilbao
- 2009–2010: Obradoiro
- 2010: Cibona
- 2010–2011: Azovmash
- 2011–2012: Helios
- 2012–2013: Türk Telekom
- 2013: Hapoel Gilboa Galil
- 2014: Široki
- 2014–2015: Al-Arabi
- 2015: Czarni Słupsk
- 2015: Zadar
- 2016: Dąbrowa Górnicza
- 2016–2019: Donar
- 2019–2020: ZZ Leiden

Career highlights
- Croatian League champion (2003); 2× Dutch League champion (2017, 2018); Croatian Cup winner (2004); 2× Dutch Cup winner (2017, 2018); Dutch Supercup winner (2016); All-DBL Team (2017)
Medals
Men's basketball
Representing Croatia
FIBA Europe Under-18 Championship
Gold medal – first place	2002 Germany	U-18 Team
Mediterranean Games
Gold medal – first place	2009 Pescara	Team competition

Drago Pašalić (pronounced [drǎgo paʃǎliːt͡ɕ]; born June 23, 1984) is a Croatian former professional basketball player. He is the current technical director of Donar. Standing at 2.08 m (6 ft 10 in), he played both power forward and center positions. In the beginning of his career he played for the Croatian national team. He is a one-time Croatian League and two-time Dutch League champion.

== Professional career ==
His first five years as a pro, Pašalić played with his hometown team, Split. In the 2002–03 season, he won the Croatian Championship with the club.

He was an early entry candidate in the 2004 NBA draft but withdrew and became one again in 2005 but was not selected. On June 29, 2016, he signed with Donar Groningen of the Dutch Basketball League. After the 2016–17 DBL regular season, he was named to the All-DBL Team. In April 2017, Pašalić extended his contract with two more years. His contract was not renewed after the 2018–19 season. Pašalić won two DBL championships with Donar.

On August 14, 2019, he has signed with ZZ Leiden of the Dutch Basketball League. After the 2019–20 season was cancelled due to the coronavirus outbreak in March 2020, Pašalić retired.

== Executive career ==
In July 2021, Pašalić became the head of technical business of Heroes Den Bosch's youth academy. On March 15, 2022, Pašalić signed with Donar to become its full-time technical director starting from the 2022–23 season.

== Personal ==
Pašalić has three children; two daughters, Kiara and Kinge, and a son, Ivan Pašalić.

On September 30, 2020, it was announced Pašalić had suffered a cardiac arrest.

== Career statistics ==
Legend
GP	Games played	GS	Games started	MPG	Minutes per game
FG%	Field-goal percentage	3P%	3-point field-goal percentage	FT%	Free-throw percentage
RPG	Rebounds per game	APG	Assists per game	SPG	Steals per game
BPG	Blocks per game	PPG	Points per game	PIR	Performance index rating
**Bold**	Career high

=== EuroLeague ===
Year	Team	GP	GS	MPG	FG%	3P%	FT%	RPG	APG	SPG	BPG	PPG	PIR
2010–11	Cibona	7	6	23.4	.525	.235	.833	4.7	0.4	0	0.6	9.1	5.6
Career		7	6	23.4	.525	.235	.833	4.7	0.4	0	0.6	9.1	5.6

== Honours and titles ==
=== Club ===
Split

- Croatian League: 2002–03
- Croatian Cup: 2004

Donar

- Dutch Basketball League: 2016–17, 2017–18
- NBB Cup: 2016–17, 2017–18
- Dutch Supercup: 2016

=== Individual ===
- All-DBL Team: 2016–17
