= Devon van Oostrum =

British-Dutch basketball player

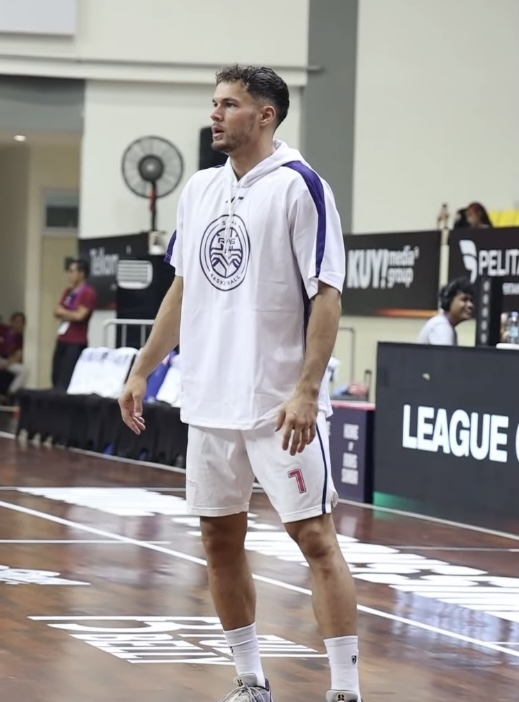
- Van Oostrum with RANS Simba Bogor in 2024

Free agent
- Position: Point guard

Personal information
- Born: 24 January 1993 (age 33) Groningen, Netherlands
- Listed height: 1.93 m (6 ft 4 in)
- Listed weight: 90 kg (198 lb)

Career information
- NBA draft: 2015: undrafted
- Playing career: 2008–present

Career history
- 2008–2009: Sheffield Sharks
- 2009–2016: Baskonia
- 2009–2011: →Fundación Baskonia
- 2011–2012: →Tarragona
- 2012–2013: →Cáceres
- 2014: →Cibona Zagreb
- 2014: →Kouvot
- 2015: → Leeds Force
- 2015: →Peñas Huesca
- 2015–2016: →Arkadikos
- 2016–2017: Koroivos Amaliadas
- 2017: MZT Skopje
- 2018–2019: New Heroes Den Bosch
- 2019: CBet Prienai
- 2019–2021: Landstede Hammers
- 2020: →Peñas Huesca
- 2022: London Lions
- 2022–2023: BK Patrioti Levice
- 2023: Trepça
- 2023–2025: RANS Simba Bogor

Career highlights
- All-IBL First Team (2025); 2x IBL All-Star (2024, 2025); Kosovo Supercup winner (2023); Slovak League champion (2023)

Devon Doekele van Oostrum (born 24 January 1993) is a British-Dutch professional basketball player for the RANS Simba Bogor of the Indonesian Basketball League (IBL). He has represented the Great Britain men's national basketball team.

== Professional career ==
After attending King Edward VII School in Sheffield, van Oostrum started his basketball career with British basketball league club Sheffield Sharks in 2008. In May 2009, van Oostrum moved to Spanish ACB team Caja Laboral, who loaned him to the reserve team Euskotren Fundación Baskonia, of the fifth tier of the Spanish basketball league.

In 2011, after playing in the 2011 Eurobasket tournament, he was loaned to Bàsquet Tarragona 2017, team of the Spanish second-tier league LEB Oro. After winning the LEB relegation playoffs, van Oostrum was called by Caja Laboral to join the roster for the 2012 ACB Playoffs.

In the summer of 2012, Baskonia sent him on loan to the LEB Oro team Cáceres Patrimonio de la Humanidad. In February 2013, he came back to the club of Vitoria after the departure of Carlos Cabezas. In September 2014, he was loaned to Cibona Zagreb for one season. On 31 October 2014, Cibona terminated contract with him, so he returned to Laboral Kutxa.

On 14 November 2014, Baskonia agreed a new loan, this time to Finnish team Kouvot. On 22 December 2014, he parted ways with Kouvot after playing 6 games with the club. On 7 January 2015 he was loaned to Leeds Force of the British Basketball League and made his debut three days later, scoring 16 points and 6 assists shooting 6-17 from the field on a loss against Plymouth Raiders. Afterwards he was loaned to Peñas Huesca of the LEB Oro.

On 11 August 2015, Van Oostrum was loaned to Arkadikos of the Greek Basket League for the 2015–16 season.

On 11 August 2016, Van Oostrum signed with Koroivos Amaliadas for the 2016–17 season. On 13 January 2017, he was released by Koroivos. Seven days later, he signed with Macedonian club MZT Skopje for the rest of the season On 27 February 2017, he parted ways with MZT Skopje because of knee injury during a semifinal match in the Macedonian Cup.

On 5 July 2018, Van Oostrum signed with New Heroes Den Bosch of the Dutch Basketball League (DBL) and the FIBA Europe Cup. On 3 October, Van Oostrum made his debut with Den Bosch in the FIBA Europe Cup qualifying game against Balkan, scoring 17 points and recording 9 rebounds and 3 assists. On 4 October, he played four minutes in his DBL debut in a win over Feyenoord Basketbal.

In August 2019, van Oostrum signed a two-month contract with CBet Prienai of the Lithuanian Basketball League (LKL). Club had an option to extend the contract for remaining of the season but decided against it and player was released on 27 October 2019.

On 4 December 2019, Van Oostrum returned to the Netherlands to sign with Landstede Hammers of the Dutch Basketball League (DBL). On the Hammers, he joined his older brother Nigel who has been on the team since 2016.

On 23 November 2020, Van Oostrum was sent on loan to Peñas Huesca for four weeks because the DBL had been suspended due to the COVID-19 pandemic. In February 2021, it was announced he had to miss the remainder of the 2020–21 season after a surgery.

On 7 September 2022, Van Oostrum signed with the London Lions for the 2022–23 BBL season.

On 11 December 2023, Van Oostrum joined RANS Simba Bogor of the Indonesian Basketball League (IBL).

== National team career ==
Van Oostrum's international debut was for England, at the 2008 FIBA Europe Under-16 Championship. He represented Great Britain at the under 20 level, and made his debut for the British senior team in a friendly against Canada. He played with Great Britain at the 2011 EuroBasket in Lithuania, and he was named British Basketball's Emerging Athlete in 2011. He missed out on a place on the Team GB squad for the 2012 Summer Olympics. He also played at the 2013 EuroBasket in Slovenia, and in the 2015 EuroBasket Qualification Tournament.

== Personal life ==
Van Oostrum is the son of Duco van Oostrum, who played basketball at the precursor of Aris Leeuwarden in the Netherlands and since 1995 teaches at Sheffield University. Devon's older brother Nigel van Oostrum plays at Landstede Basketbal since 2016. He holds dual citizenship between the United Kingdom and the Netherlands.

He is of Indonesian descent through his mother.
