= Erik Braal =

Dutch professional basketball coach

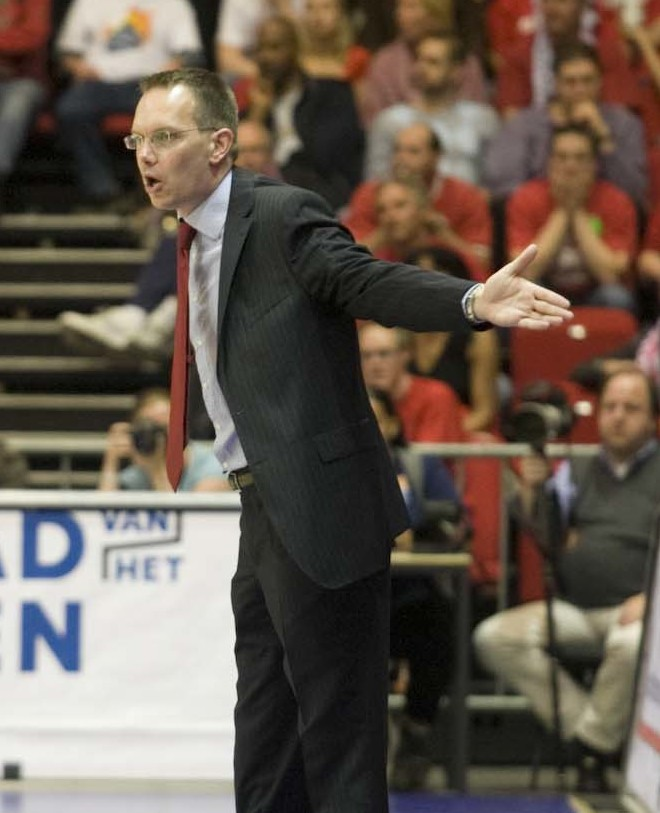
- Braal as coach of the West-Brabant Giants in 2010

Heroes Den Bosch
- Position: Head coach
- League: BNXT League

Personal information
- Born: May 16, 1971 (age 55) Werkendam, Netherlands
- Coaching career: 2003–present

Career history

Coaching
- 2003–2008: Rotterdam
- 2008–2010: West-Brabant Giants
- 2011–2013: Aris Leeuwarden
- 2013–2015: Oberwart Gunners
- 2015–2020: Donar
- 2021–present: Heroes Den Bosch

Career highlights
- 5× Dutch League champion (2016–2018, 2022, 2025); 4× Dutch Cup champion (2017, 2018, 2024, 2025); 4× Dutch Supercup champion (2016, 2018, 2022, 2025); 4× DBL Coach of the Year (2006, 2008, 2017, 2018); FIBA Europe Cup Coach of the Year (2018)

Erik Braal (born May 16, 1971) is a Dutch professional basketball coach, currently serving as head coach for Heroes Den Bosch. He was the head coach of Donar from 2015 until 2020. Braal was the most successful coach ever for the club with seven trophies won.

== Career ==
Braal was head coach of Rotterdam Basketbal for five years, from 2003 till 2008. After that he became head coach of West-Brabant Giants. He led the team to the Dutch Finals for the first time in club history, in 2009–10.

In 2011 he signed with Aris Leeuwarden. In 2012–13 he led Aris to the Finals, also for the first time in history. His team surprised everyone by beating heavy favorite EiffelTowers Den Bosch in the semifinals.

In March 2014, he signed with Austrian team Oberwart Gunners. Oberwart Gunners fired Braal during the 2004 / 2015 season due to poor results.

In June 2015, he signed a two-year deal with Donar Groningen.On 14 April 2020, Donar announced Braal's contract would not be extended in mutual consent. Braal won the most trophies in club history, with seven in total.

On 15 June 2021, Braal signed a 2-year contract with Heroes Den Bosch. He won the 2021–22 Dutch national championship with Den Bosch after beating ZZ Leiden 3–2 in the Dutch finals.

In the 2024–25 season, Braal guided Heroes to the double, winning both the Dutch Cup and the DBL finals.

== Honours ==
Donar

- 3× Dutch Basketball League: (2016, 2017, 2018)
- 2× Dutch Supercup: (2016, 2018)
- 4× Dutch Cup: (2017, 2018, 2024, 2025)

Heroes Den Bosch

- 2× Dutch national champion: (2022, 2025)
- 2× Dutch Cup: (2024, 2025)
- 2× Dutch Supercup: (2022, 2025)

=== Individual awards ===
- 4× DBL Coach of the Year: (2006, 2008, 2017, 2018)
- FIBA Europe Cup Fan Vote Coach of the Year: (2018)
