= Will Sullivan (basketball) =

American basketball player

Personal information
- Born: August 15, 1992 (age 34) Elmhurst, Illinois
- Listed height: 6 ft 3 in (1.91 m)
- Listed weight: 188 kg (414 lb)

Career information
- High school: York (Elmhurst, Illinois)
- College: Miami (Ohio) (2011–2015)
- NBA draft: 2015: undrafted
- Playing career: 2015–2016
- Position: Shooting guard / point guard
- Number: 3

Career history
- 2015–2016: Donar

Career highlights
- DBL champion (2016)

Will Sullivan (born August 15, 1992) is an American retired basketball player. Sullivan usually plays as shooting guard or point guard and is known for his shooting and defensive capabilities.

== Career ==
Sullivan played four seasons of college basketball with the Miami RedHawks.

In August 2015, he signed a one-year contract with Donar in the Dutch Basketball League (DBL). In his first professional season, Sullivan won the DBL championship with Donar.
