= Maaspoort =

Indoor arena in Den Bosch, Netherlands

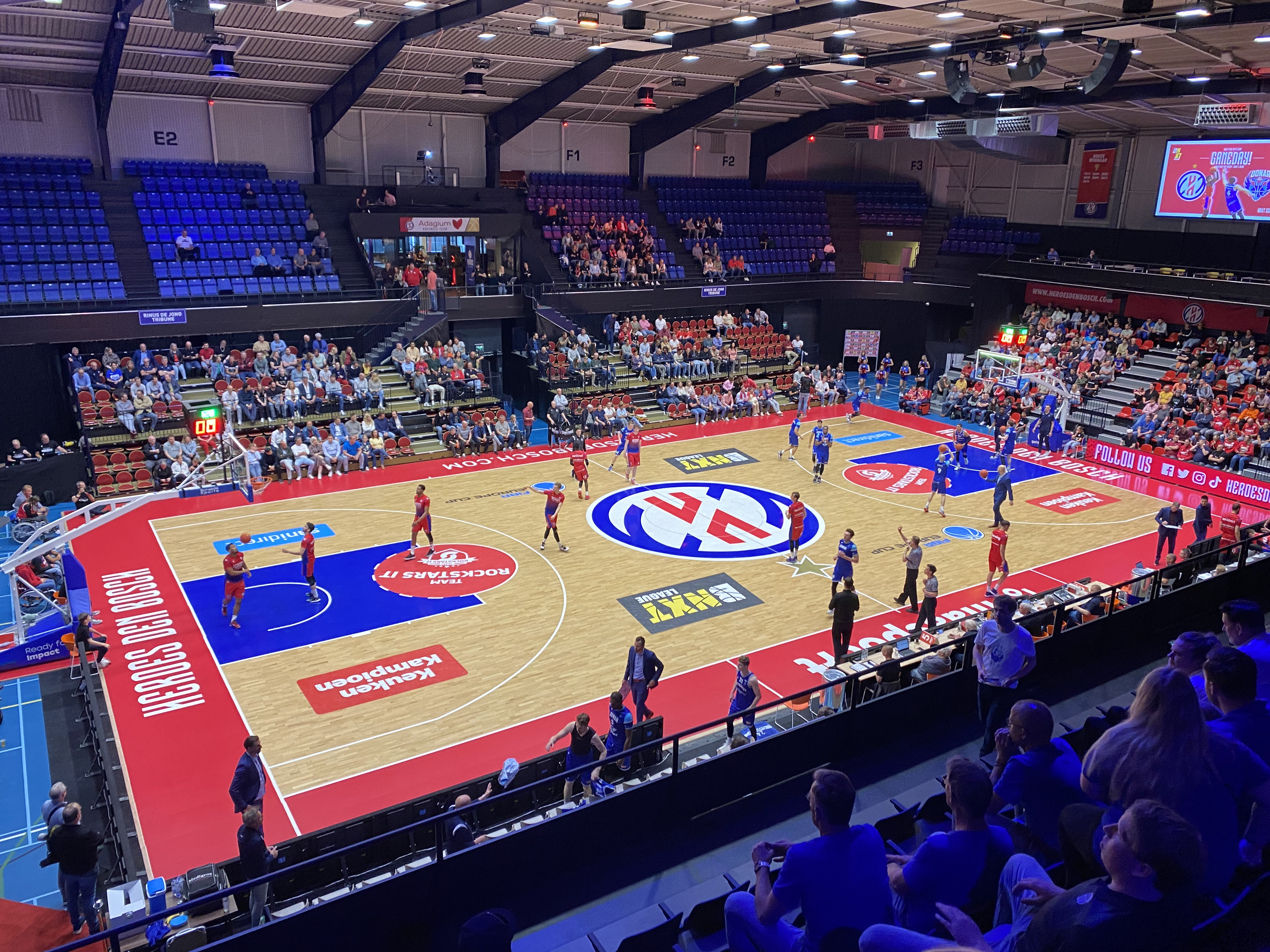
- The Maaspoort hosting a basketball game in 2022
- Interactive map of Maaspoort
- Full name: Maaspoort Den Bosch
- Location: Marathonloop 1 5235 AA 's-Hertogenbosch, Netherlands
- Coordinates: 51°43′21.64″N 5°18′55.87″E
- Capacity: 2,700 (basketball); 4,000 (concerts)

Construction
- Opened: 2 September 1982; 44 years ago

Tenant
- Heroes Den Bosch (1982–present)

Website
- www.msedb.nl

The Maaspoort (English: Meuse Gate) is an indoor arena in 's-Hertogenbosch, Netherlands. Opened on 2 September 1982, it has a seating capacity for 3,500 people in sporting events and 4,000 for concerts. It is the regular home venue of the Heroes Den Bosch basketball club. In 1982, the Maaspoort hosted the final of the FIBA Intercontinental Cup.

Preceded by Ginásio do Ibirapuera; São Paulo	FIBA Intercontinental Cup; Final Venue; 1982	Succeeded by Estadio Obras Sanitarias; Buenos Aires
