= 2012–13 NBB Cup =

NBB Cup
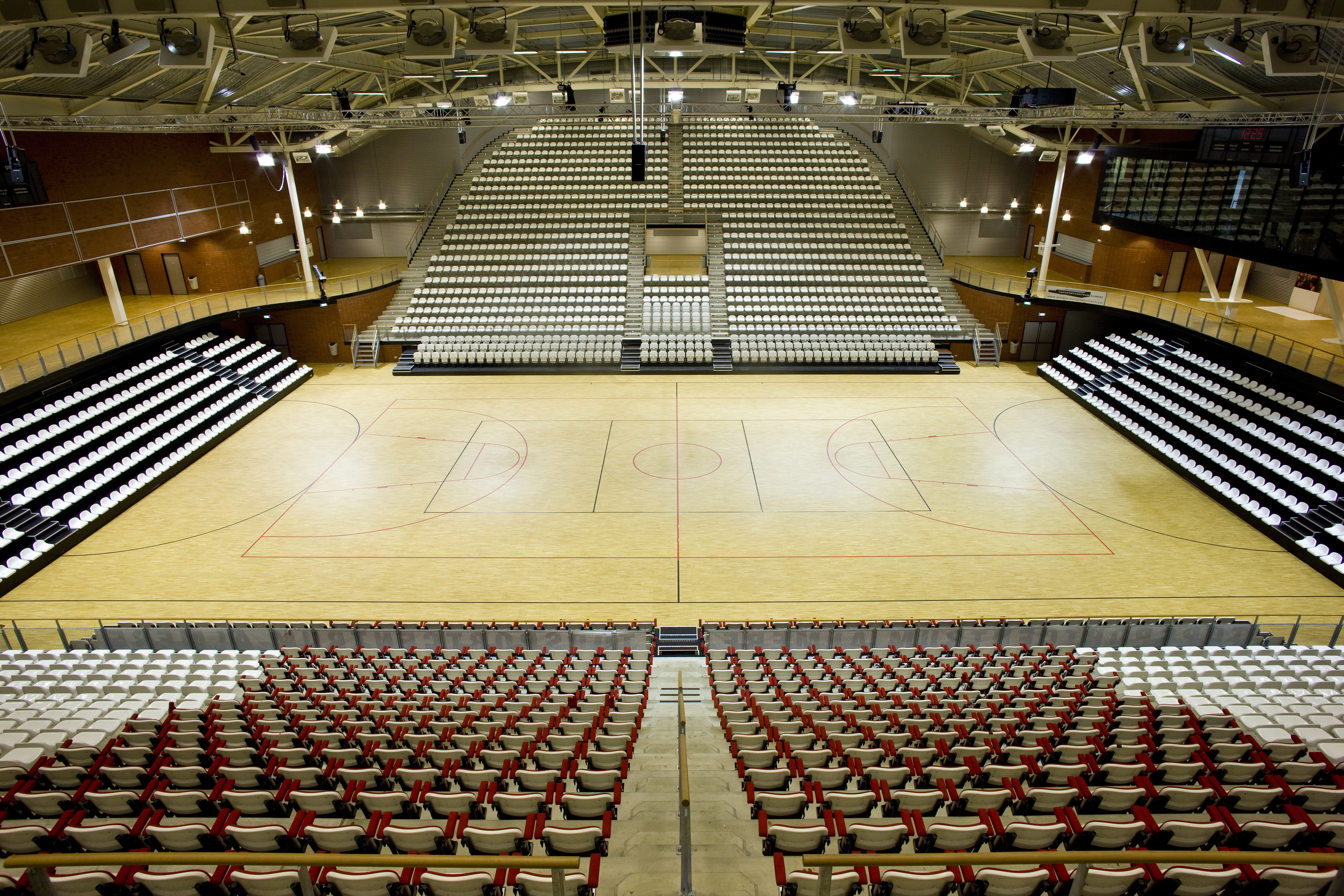
- The final was played at the Topsportcentrum in Almere
- Teams: 48 (All rounds)

Finals
- Champions: EiffelTowers Den Bosch (6th title)
- Runners-up: Landstede Zwolle

The 2012–13 NBB Cup was the 45th season of the Dutch NBB Cup. The championship game was played on March 24, 2013 in the Topsportcentrum (Almere). EiffelTowers Den Bosch won the game 73–61 over Landstede Basketbal and the club won its sixth NBB Cup title.

== Bracket ==
The bracket includes games beginning with the 4th round, when professional teams from the DBL play their first games. In the quarterfinals and semifinals, the teams played two games.

4th Round
Landstede Zwolle	79
Apollo	62
The Jugglers	82
Red Giants	68
Cangeroes Utrecht	84
Orca's Urk	82
Virtus Werkendam	62
Aris Leeuwarden	91
Matrixx Magixx	72
Stepco BSW	64
Binnenland	52
EiffelTowers Den Bosch	71
Den Helder Kings	83
Rotterdam Basketbal College	68
GasTerra Flames	49
ZZ Leiden	54

Quarterfinals
Landstede Zwolle	198
The Jugglers	101
Cangeroes Utrecht	135
Aris Leeuwarden	183
Matrixx Magixx	139
EiffelTowers Den Bosch	194
Den Helder Kings	122
Zorg en Zekerheid Leiden	144

Semifinals
Landstede Zwolle	151
Aris Leeuwarden	149
EiffelTowers Den Bosch	137
Zorg en Zekerheid Leiden	128

Final
Landstede Zwolle	61
EiffelTowers Den Bosch	73

=== Final ===
NOS

March 24, 2013
15:00

Report

Landstede Zwolle	61–75	EiffelTowers Den Bosch

Topsportcentrum, Almere
Attendance: 2,000

2013 NBB Cup Winner
EiffelTowers Den Bosch
6th title
