= Dutch Basketball Supercup =

Basketball Supercup

- Organising body: Dutch Basketball League (DBL)
- Founded: 2011; 15 years ago
- First season: 2011
- Country: Netherlands
- Number of teams: 2
- Related competitions: Dutch Basketball League; Dutch Basketball Cup
- Current champions: Landstede Hammers (3rd title) (2026)
- Most championships: ZZ Leiden (5 titles)

The Dutch Basketball Supercup, also known as the DBL Supercup, is the super cup competition of professional basketball in the Netherlands. The match is played by the champions of the Dutch Basketball League and the winner of the NBB Cup. It is a super cup competition. The first Supercup game was held in 2011.

The record holder for most Supercup titles is ZZ Leiden, who have won five trophies.

== Title holders ==
- 2011 Leiden (ZZ)
- 2012 Leiden (ZZ)
- 2013 Den Bosch (SPM Shoeters)
- 2014 Donar (GasTerra Flames)
- 2015 Den Bosch (SPM Shoeters)
- 2016 Donar
- 2017 Landstede Zwolle
- 2018 Donar
- 2019 Landstede Hammers
- 2021 Leiden (ZZ)
- 2022 Heroes Den Bosch
- 2023 Leiden (ZZ)
- 2024 Leiden (ZZ)
- 2025 Heroes Den Bosch
- 2026 Landstede Hammers

== Games ==
Year	Winner(s)	Score	Runners-up	Venue	Attendance	Top scorer	Winners' coach	Ref.
2011	ZZ Leiden	66–60	Donar (Note: Known as "GasTerra Flames".)	Nieuw Welgelegen, Utrecht		Seamus Boxley (15)	Toon van Helfteren	
2012	ZZ Leiden	67–57	Den Bosch	Maaspoort, 's-Hertogenbosch		DeJuan Wright (18)	Toon van Helfteren	
2013	Den Bosch	68–47	ZZ Leiden	Vijf Meihal, Leiden	1,500	Kees Akerboom (17)	Sam Jones	
2014	Donar	78–67	ZZ Leiden	MartiniPlaza, Groningen	1,040	DeJuan Wright (20)	Ivica Skelin	
2015	Den Bosch	85–72	Donar	Maaspoort, 's-Hertogenbosch (2)		Will Sullivan (17)	Sam Jones	
2016	Donar	88–51	Den Bosch	MartiniPlaza, Groningen (2)	1,100	Drago Pašalić (20)	Erik Braal	
2017	Landstede	77–69	Donar	MartiniPlaza, Groningen (3)	2,320	Noah Dahlman (20)	Herman van den Belt	
2018	Donar	74–69	ZZ Leiden	MartiniPlaza, Groningen (4)		Darius Thompson (21)	Erik Braal	
2019	Landstede Hammers	78–68	ZZ Leiden	Landstede Sportcentrum, Zwolle	800	Jordan Johnson (19)	Herman van den Belt	
2020	Not held due to the COVID-19 pandemic							
2021	Leiden	87–74	BAL	Vijf Meihal, Leiden (2)	500	Jhonathan Dunn and Chris Hudson (20 each)	Geert Hammink	
2022	Heroes Den Bosch	76–59	Donar	Maaspoort, 's-Hertogenbosch (3)		Vernon Taylor (20)	Erik Braal	
2023	ZZ Leiden	62–57	Landstede Hammers	Vijf Meihal, Leiden (3)		Roeland Schaftenaar (17)	Doug Spradley	
2024	ZZ Leiden	87–58	Heroes Den Bosch	Sportcomplex 1574, Leiden	1,500	Aaron Cook (18)	Doug Spradley	
2025	Heroes Den Bosch	108–77	Donar	Maaspoort, 's-Hertogenbosch (4)	1,600	Kerwin Walton (27)	Erik Braal	
2026	Landstede Hammers	70-62	Donar	Landstede Sportcentrum, Zwolle (2)		Kevon Goodwin (21)	Gaëlle Bouzin	

== Performance by club ==
Club	Winners	Runners-up	Seasons won	Seasons lost
ZZ Leiden	5	4	2011, 2012, 2021, 2023, 2024	2013, 2014, 2018, 2019
Heroes Den Bosch	4	3	2013, 2015, 2022, 2025	2012, 2016, 2024
Donar	3	6	2014, 2016, 2018	2011, 2015, 2017, 2022, 2025, 2026
Landstede Hammers	3	1	2017, 2019, 2026	2023
BAL	–	1	–	2021

== Top scorers ==
The record for most scored points in a Supercup game is 26, by Jordan Johnson of the Landstede Hammers in the 2018 edition. DeJuan Wright is the only player to be top scorer in the SuperCup twice, in 2012 and 2014.

Year	Player	Points
2011	(United States) Seamus Boxley	15
2012	(United States) DeJuan Wright	18
2013	(Netherlands) Kees Akerboom	17
2014	(United States) DeJuan Wright (2)	20
2015	(United States) Will Sullivan	17
2016	(Croatia) Drago Pašalić	20
2017	(United States) Noah Dahlman	20
2018	(United States) Darius Thompson	21
2019	(United States) Jordan Johnson	26
2021	(United States) Jhonathan Dunn	20
2021	(United States) Chris Hudson	20
2022	(United States) Vernon Taylor	20
2023	(Netherlands) Roeland Schaftenaar	17
2024	(United States) Aaron Cook	18
2025	(United States) Kerwin Walton	27
2026	(United States) Kevon Goodwin	21

== See also ==
- Dutch Basketball League
- Basketball Cup
