= 2021–22 Donar (basketball club) season =

Donar
2021–22 season
- Chairman: Jannes Stokroos
- Head coach: Matthew Otten (1st season)
- Arena: MartiniPlaza
- BNXT League: National semifinals
- Playoffs: Runners-up
- Basketball Cup: Winners
- FIBA Europe Cup: Regular Season
- Biggest win: CobraNova 57–107 Donar (39 points; 11 December)
- Biggest defeat: Donar 63–92 ZZ Leiden (29 points; 19 December)

The 2021–22 Donar season was the 50th season in the existence of the club. The club played its first season in the BNXT League, a newly established league which combines the Belgian and Dutch national leagues.

== Overview ==
This was the first season under newly hired head coach Matthew Otten, who came over from Yoast United. Otten returned to Donar after playing a on the championship team in 2010. Along with Otten, star point guard Austin Luke came over from United. Additionally, Donar recruited five new foreign players. The team managed to qualify for the regular season after it finished in second place in the qualifying tournament hosted at MartiniPlaza. In the regular season, Donar failed to advance after taking big losses against London Lions and Medi Bayreuth.

In the BNXT League season, Donar stumbled in the first quarter of the season with an opening day loss against Aris Leeuwarden. In early November, two new foreign players were signed in Donte Thomas and Jimmy Gavin. Donar ended the year 2021 with two losses against ZZ Leiden and Yoast United.

On 20 March 2022, Donar won its seventh national Basketball Cup after defeating Heroes Den Bosch in the final, which was played in the MartiniPlaza. In the national playoffs, Donar was swept 0-3 by Heroes. In the BNXT Play-offs, they reached the finals where they lost to ZZ Leiden over two games.

== Players ==
=== Squad information ===
Donar roster
Players
Coaches

Pos.	No.	Nat.	Name	Ht.	Wt.	Age
PF	0	(United States)	Thomas, Donte	2.01 m (6 ft 7 in)	102 kg (225 lb)	30 – 6 May 1996
PG	1	(United States)	Luke, Austin	1.91 m (6 ft 3 in)	93 kg (205 lb)	31 – 27 October 1994
SF	2	(United States)	Ingram, Donte	1.98 m (6 ft 6 in)	98 kg (216 lb)	29 – 15 August 1996
PG	5	(Netherlands)	Williams, Leon	1.89 m (6 ft 2 in)	75 kg (165 lb)	34 – 25 July 1991
G	6	(Netherlands)	Adetunji, Sheyi	1.87 m (6 ft 2 in)		26 – 11 September 1999
PG	9	(United States)	Gavin, Jimmy	1.91 m (6 ft 3 in)	88 kg (194 lb)	34 – 28 August 1991
PF	12	(Nigeria)	Egekeze, Amanze	2.03 m (6 ft 8 in)	100 kg (220 lb)	30 – 3 December 1995
C	14	(Netherlands)	Koenis, Thomas (C)	2.10 m (6 ft 11 in)	103 kg (227 lb)	36 – 11 December 1989
PF	19	(Netherlands)	Brandwijk, Willem	2.06 m (6 ft 9 in)	100 kg (220 lb)	30 – 31 July 1995
SF	21	(United States)	Caruso, Henry	1.93 m (6 ft 4 in)	95 kg (209 lb)	30 – 1 July 1995
C	24	(Nigeria)	Nwogbo, Lotanna	2.03 m (6 ft 8 in)	116 kg (256 lb)	33 – 30 May 1993
PF	27	(Netherlands)	Roorda, Mark	1.98 m (6 ft 6 in)		23 – 20 November 2002
F	32	(Netherlands)	Zuidema, Kjeld	1.95 m (6 ft 5 in)	90 kg (198 lb)	24 – 21 June 2001
SG	34	(United States)	Addison, Marquis	1.96 m (6 ft 5 in)	82 kg (181 lb)	34 – 6 December 1991

Head coach

- (United States) Matthew Otten

Assistant coach(es)

- (Netherlands) Jan Stalman

Legend

- (C) Team captain
- (DP) Development player
- (I) Import player
- Injured

- Roster
Updated: 14 November 2021

Note: Flags indicate national team eligibility at FIBA-sanctioned events. Players may hold other non-FIBA nationalities not displayed.

=== Depth chart ===
Pos.	Starting 5	Bench 1	Bench 2	Bench 3
C	Thomas Koenis	Lotanna Nwogbo
PF	Amanze Egekeze	Willem Brandwijk		Mark Roorda
SF	Donte Ingram	Donte Thomas	Kjeld Zuidema
SG	Henry Caruso	Marquis Addison
PG	Austin Luke	Jimmy Gavin	Leon Williams	Sheyi Adetunji

=== Transactions ===
==== In ====
No.	Pos.	Nat.	Name	Age	Moving from		Ends	Date	Source
1	PG	(United States)	Austin Luke	26	Yoast United	(Netherlands)	2022	4 June 2020	
2	G/F	(United States)	Donte Ingram	24	Nelson Giants	(New Zealand)	2022	12 June 2020	
34	SG	(United States)	Marquis Addison	29	CSU Sibiu	(Romania)	2022	22 June 2020	
12	PF	(Nigeria)	Amanze Egekeze	25	BC Gries-Oberhoffen	(France)	2022	30 June 2020	
27	PF	(Netherlands)	Mark Roorda	18	Donar U22	(Netherlands)	2022	26 July 2021	
24	C	(Nigeria)	Lotanna Nwogbo	28	Coruña	(Spain)	2022	26 July 2021	
9	PG	(United States)	Jimmy Gavin	29	Akhisar Belediyespor	(Turkey)	2022	12 November 2021	
0	PF	(United States)	Donte Thomas	25	Alba Fehérvár	(Hungary)	2022	14 November 2021	

1. In players: Players who signed after the beginning of the season

=== Out ===
No.	Pos.	Nat.	Name	Age	Moving to		Type	Date	Source
9	PF	(Croatia)	Damjan Rudež	34	Retired		Mutual consent	28 May 2021	
1	SF	(Netherlands)	Nesta Agasi	20	Yoast United	(Netherlands)	End of contract	26 June 2021	
3	PG	(Canada)	Jarred Ogungbemi-Jackson	29	Bakken Bears	(Denmark)	End of contract	10 July 2021	
7	SG	(United States)	DaVonté Lacy	28	Patrioti Levice	(Slovakia)	End of contract	20 July 2021	
22	SG	(United States)	Will Moreton	23	Albacete	(Spain)	End of contract	15 September 2021	
24	SG	(United States)	Justin Watts	31			End of contract		
33	C	(United States)	Juwann James	34	SAM Massagno	(Switzerland)	End of contract	23 September 2021	

== Preseason ==
21 August 2021 1	Donar (Netherlands)	113–43	(Netherlands) De Groene Uilen	Groningen
18:30	Scoring by quarter: 38-13, 20-7, 25-7, 24-16
	Pts: Ingram, 23; Rebs: Luke, 8 Asts: Luke, 15		Pts: Swart, 11; Rebs: Visser, 5 Asts: Multiple, 2	Arena: MartiniPlaza; Attendance: 400

29 August 2021 2	Bakken Bears (Denmark)	85–92	(Netherlands) Donar	Aarhus
14:00	Scoring by quarter: 17-24, 28-24, 8-24, 32-20
	Pts: Evans, 19; Rebs: Taylor, 7 Asts: Darboe, 5		Pts: Egekeze, 21; Rebs: Addison, 8 Asts: Luke, 8

10 September 2021 3	Donar (Netherlands)	70–59	(United Kingdom) Leicester Riders	Veendam
14:00
				Arena: Wildervanckhal

11 September 2021 4	Donar (Netherlands)	90–72	(United Kingdom) Leicester Riders	Groningen
14:00
				Arena: MartiniPlaza

19 September 2021 5	Landstede Hammers (Netherlands)	79–77	(Netherlands) Donar	Zwolle
14:00
				Arena: Landstede Sportcentrum

== BNXT League ==
=== Domestic Phase ===
==== Standings ====
Pos	Team	Pld	W	L	PF	PA	PD	Pts	Qualification
1	Heroes Den Bosch	20	18	2	1764	1399	+365	38	Advance to Elite Gold
2	ZZ Leiden	20	17	3	1749	1331	+418	37	Advance to Elite Gold
3	Donar	20	14	6	1510	1271	+239	34	Advance to Elite Gold
4	Landstede Hammers	20	14	6	1612	1433	+179	34	Advance to Elite Gold
5	Feyenoord	20	10	10	1549	1564	−15	30	Advance to Elite Gold

Source: BNXT League

==== Results ====
Due to the COVID-19 pandemic in the Netherlands, games had to be played behind closed doors from 12 November. Multiple games were rescheduled to later dates.

24 September 2021 1	Aris Leeuwarden	81–80	Donar	Leeuwarden
20:00	Scoring by quarter: 23–24, 22–17, 11–13, 25–16
	Pts: Brock 21; Rebs: Logan 9 Asts: Brock 5	Boxscore	Pts: Caruso 18; Rebs: Koenis 7 Asts: Addison 6	Arena: Kalverdijkje; Attendance: 500

26 September 2021 2	Donar	96–60	Apollo Amsterdam	Groningen
14:00	Scoring by quarter: 19–19, 24–9, 33–17, 20–15
	Pts: Ingram 23; Rebs: Ingram 10; Asts: Luke 8		Pts: Taraš 12; Rebs: Kayhan 5 Asts: Hope, Weijs 4	Arena: MartiniPlaza; Attendance: 2,000

6 October 2021 3	The Hague Royals	52–91	Donar	The Hague
20:00	Scoring by quarter: 17–22, 15–22, 14–27, 6–20
	Pts: Lopes 15; Rebs: Lopes 10; Asts: Kumelis 5	Boxscore	Pts: Ingram 20; Rebs: Brandwijk 9 Asts: Williams 7	Arena: Sportcampus Zuiderpark; Attendance: 139

9 October 2021 4	Donar	67–69OT	Landstede Hammers	Groningen
19:30	Scoring by quarter: 17–24, 9–6, 25–22, 9–8, Overtime: 7–9
	Pts: Williams 23; Rebs: Nwogbo 11; Asts: Williams 7	Boxscore	Pts: Dahlman 20; Rebs: Dahlman 11; Asts: Echols 6	Arena: MartiniPlaza; Attendance: 2,510

16 October 2021 5	Den Helder Suns	78–88	Donar	Den Helder
19:00	Scoring by quarter: 19–18, 24–20, 20–29, 15–20
	Pts: Van den Elzen 17; Rebs: Brussen 7 Asts: Three players 3	Boxscore	Pts: Caruso 25; Rebs: Caruso 14; Asts: Williams 5	Arena: Sporthal Sportlaan; Attendance: 259

23 October 2021 6	Donar	62–68	Heroes Den Bosch	Groningen
20:00	Scoring by quarter: 19–21, 18–14, 19–21, 6–12
	Pts: Caruso 25; Rebs: Caruso 8 Asts: Williams 7 PIR: Egekeze 16	Boxscore	Pts: Mounce 15; Rebs: Carlson 8 Asts: Carlson 5 PIR: Carlson 19	Arena: MartiniPlaza; Attendance: 3,000

31 October 2021 7	Landstede Hammers	63–75	Donar	Zwolle
14:00	Scoring by quarter: 16-12, 14-12, 16-27, 17-24
	Pts: Dahlman 19; Rebs: Dahlman 10; Asts: Echols 4 PIR: Bleeker 17	Boxscore	Pts: Caruso 19; Rebs: Caruso 12; Asts: Addison 6 PIR: Caruso 27	Arena: Landstede Sportcentrum; Attendance: 500

5 December 2021 8	Yoast United	81–87	Donar	Bemmel
15:00	Scoring by quarter: 18–24, 15–22, 20–25, 18–16
	Pts: Wilson 21; Rebs: N'Guessan 12; Asts: Britt 6 PIR: N'Guessan 16	Boxscore	Pts: Egekeze 21; Rebs: Caruso 12; Asts: Addison 6 PIR: Caruso 25	Arena: De Kooi; Attendance: 10

14 November 2021 9	Donar	83–40	BAL	Groningen
20:00	Scoring by quarter: 24–7, 23–10, 21–8, 15–15
	Pts: Nwogbo, Addison 15; Rebs: Nwogbo 9 Asts: Williams 8 PIR: Nwogbo 26		Pts: Mitchell 9 Rebs: De Vries 5 Asts: De Vries 3 PIR: Nossek 10	Arena: MartiniPlaza; Attendance: 0

3 December 2021 10	Donar	84–75	Feyenoord	Groningen
20:00	Scoring by quarter: 23–17, 19–21, 27–14, 15–23
	Pts: Nwogbo 14; Rebs: Caruso, Nwogbo 6 Asts: Williams 8 PIR: Nwogbo 17		Pts: Jones 19; Rebs: Van der List 6 Asts: Collins 3 PIR: Bruining 9	Arena: MartiniPlaza; Attendance: 0

19 December 2021 11	Donar	63–92	ZZ Leiden	Groningen
14:00	Scoring by quarter: 16–19, 16–20, 15–25, 16–28
	Pts: Gavin 15; Rebs: Nwogbo 7 Asts: Williams 5 PIR: Nwogbo 17	Boxscore	Pts: Bouwknecht 26; Rebs: Tubutis 8 Asts: Ververs 5 PIR: Bouwknecht 29	Arena: MartiniPlaza; Attendance: 0

22 December 2021 12	Donar	84–85	Yoast United	Groningen
20:00	Scoring by quarter: 28–28, 15–17, 22–22, 19–18
	Pts: Nwogbo 24; Rebs: Caruso 14; Asts: Williams 3 PIR: Caruso 22	Boxscore	Pts: Wilson 18; Rebs: Ferguson 7 Asts: Wilson 6 PIR: Wilson 20	Arena: MartiniPlaza; Attendance: 0

11 January 2022 13	Donar	85–58	The Hague Royals	Groningen
20:00	Scoring by quarter: 18–20, 20–15, 31–14, 16–9
	Pts: Nwogbo 20; Rebs: Thomas 8 Asts: Williams 7 PIR: Nwogbo 24	Boxscore	Pts: Te Velde 18; Rebs: Knepa 10; Asts: Lopes 10; PIR: Te Velde 16	Arena: MartiniPlaza; Attendance: 0

12 January 2021 (Note: The game between Apollo Amsterdam and Donar was forfeited by Apollo due to COVID-19.) 14	Apollo Amsterdam	0–20	Donar	Amsterdam
20:00
				Arena: Apollohal

20 January 2022 (Note: The game between BAL and Donar on 20 January was forfeited by BAL after multiple players tested positive for COVID-19.) 15	BAL	0–20	Donar	Weert
20:00
				Arena: Sporthal Boshoven

22 January 2021 16	ZZ Leiden	69–71	Donar	Leiden
20:00
				Arena: Vijf Meihal

26 January 2022 17	Feyenoord	79–93	Donar	Rotterdam
20:00
				Arena: Topsportcentrum Rotterdam

29 January 2022 18	Heroes Den Bosch	100–78	Donar	Groningen
20:30
				Arena: MartiniPlaza

16 February 2022 19	Donar	80–69	Aris Leeuwarden	Groningen
19:30
				Arena: MartiniPlaza

19 February 2022 20	Donar	93–52	Den Helder Suns	Groningen
20:00
				Arena: MartiniPlaza

=== Elite Gold ===
==== Standings ====
Pos	Team	Pld	W	L	PF	PA	PD	Pts	Qualification
5	(Netherlands) Heroes Den Bosch	10	4	6	2423	2132	+291	31	Advance to National Playoffs Semifinals (NL)
6	(Belgium) Antwerp Giants	10	6	4	2393	2204	+189	31	Advance to National Playoffs Quarterfinals (BE)
7	(Netherlands) Donar	10	5	5	2206	2025	+181	30	Advance to National Playoffs Quarterfinals (NL)
8	(Belgium) Mons-Hainaut	10	5	5	2200	2170	+30	30	Advance to National Playoffs Quarterfinals (BE)
9	(Netherlands) Landstede Hammers	10	0	10	2228	2230	−2	25	Advance to National Playoffs Quarterfinals (NL)

Source: BNXT League

==== Results ====
6 March 2022 1	Filou Oostende	98–74	Donar	Ostend
15:00
				Arena: Sleuyter Arena

16 March 2022 2	Donar	81–75	Belfius Mons-Hainaut	Groningen
19:30	Scoring by quarter: 18–13, 22–21, 23–21, 18–30
	Pts: Williams 18; Rebs: Caruso 10; Asts: Six players 2 PIR: Williams 17	Boxscore	Pts: Nzekwesi 25; Rebs: Nzekwesi 6 Asts: Morant, Pašalić 4 PIR: Nzekwesi 27	Arena: MartiniPlaza; Attendance: 2,400

27 March 2022 3	Telenet Giants Antwerp	93–95(2OT)	Donar	Antwerp
15:00
		Boxscore		Arena: Lotto Arena

30 March 2022 3	Kangoeroes Mechelen	86–61	Donar	Mechelen
20:30
				Arena: Sporthal Winketaai

2 April 2022 4	Donar	68–72	Leuven Bears	Groningen
20:00	Scoring by quarter: 12–15, 25–14, 10–28, 21–15
	Pts: Addison 23; Rebs: Thomas, Nwogbo 6 Asts: Williams 5 PIR: Addison 17	Boxscore	Pts: Heath 20; Rebs: McGlynn 9 Asts: Heath 6 PIR: Heath 24	Arena: MartiniPlaza; Attendance: 2,500

9 April 2022 5	Leuven Bears	88–83	Donar	Leuven
20:30	Scoring by quarter: 18–15, 25–19, 20–23, 25–26
	Pts: Čebašek 28; Rebs: Čebašek 12; Asts: Three players 4 PIR: Čebašek 32	Boxscore	Pts: Addison 20; Rebs: Brandwijk 10; Asts: Jimmy Gavin 5 PIR: Addison, Koenis 22	Arena: SportOase

15 April 2022 6	Donar	71–66	Kangoeroes Mechelen	Groningen
20:00	Scoring by quarter: 17–12, 25–22, 18–13, 11–19
	Pts: Gavin 15; Rebs: Brandwijk 10; Asts: Addison 4 PIR: Brandwijk 16	Boxscore	Pts: Loubry 25; Rebs: Stephens 10; Asts: Loubry 5 PIR: Stephens 29	Arena: MartiniPlaza; Attendance: 3,300; Referees: N. Zwiep, M. Shouman, J. Van Dam

19 April 2022 7	Donar	81–75	Telenet Giants Antwerp	Groningen
19:30	Scoring by quarter: 16–20, 17–19, 31–21, 17–15
	Pts: Gavin 15; Rebs: Nwogbo 11; Asts: Addison 5 PIR: Luke, Nwogbo 21	Boxscore	Pts: Brown 18; Rebs: Mwema 7 Asts: Hands 5 PIR: Mwema 19	Arena: MartiniPlaza; Attendance: 3,100

23 April 2022 8	Belfius Mons-Hainaut	74–83	Donar	Mons
15:00	Scoring by quarter: 20–21, 20–21, 19–20, 15–20
	Pts: Nzekwesi 21; Rebs: Nzekwesi 6 Asts: Pašalić 7 PIR: Nichols 19	Boxscore	Pts: Nwogbo 16; Rebs: Egekeze 8 Asts: Gavin, Luke 4 PIR: Egekeze, Nwogbo 18	Arena: Mons Arena; Attendance: 1,400

29 April 2022 9	Donar	70–87	Filou Oostende	Groningen
20:00	Scoring by quarter: 15–18, 21–21, 24–27, 10–21
	Pts: Ingram 20; Rebs: Brandwijk 9 Asts: Luke 8 PIR: Ingram 18	Boxscore	Pts: Booth 21; Rebs: Conger 7 Asts: Van der Vuurst de Vries 6 PIR: Booth 23	Arena: MartiniPlaza; Attendance: 3,700; Referees: T. Last, S. Kestein, J. Zeinstra

=== Dutch Playoffs ===
==== Quarterfinals ====
3 May 2022 Game 1	Donar	69–72	Aris Leeuwarden	Groningen
19:30	Scoring by quarter: 20–18, 16–20, 20–22, 13–12
	Pts: Thomas 12; Rebs: Koenis 6 Asts: Gavin 4 PIR: Thomas 17	Boxscore	Pts: Brock 19; Rebs: Pruitt 8 Asts: Brock 5 PIR: Brock 21	Arena: MartiniPlaza; Attendance: 2,600

5 May 2022 Game 2	Aris Leeuwarden	62–99	Donar	Leeuwarden
20:00	Scoring by quarter: 13–33, 7–27, 20–22, 22–17
	Pts: Pruitt 13; Rebs: Doorson 7 Asts: Brock 4 PIR: Pruitt 17	Boxscore	Pts: Addison 15; Rebs: Caruso 8 Asts: Gavin, Luke 6 PIR: Caruso 20	Arena: Kalverdijkje

7 May 2022 Game 3	Donar	99–82	Aris Leeuwarden	Groningen
20:00	Scoring by quarter: 28–21, 17–18, 25–25, 29–18
	Pts: Addison 25; Rebs: Brandwijk 14; Asts: three players 5 PIR: three players 21	Boxscore	Pts: Cooper 20; Rebs: Cooper, Pruitt 5 Asts: Logan 8 PIR: Logan 25	Arena: MartiniPlaza; Attendance: 2,800

==== Semifinals ====
10 May 2022 Game 1	Heroes Den Bosch	77–65	Donar	's-Hertogenbosch
20:00	Scoring by quarter: 19–11, 18–23, 23–17, 17–14
	Pts: Maxhuni 22; Rebs: Kherrazi 12; Asts: Maxhuni 5 PIR: Maxhuni, van der Mars 20	Boxscore	Pts: Egekeze 12; Rebs: Thomas 7 Asts: Luke 8 PIR: Egekeze 12	Arena: Maaspoort; Attendance: 1,200

12 May 2022 Game 2	Donar	67–73	Heroes Den Bosch	Groningen
20:00	Scoring by quarter: 11–16, 17–22, 20–20, 19–15
	Pts: Addison 16; Rebs: Caruso 9 Asts: Luke 4 PIR: Caruso 16	Boxscore	Pts: Hammink 20; Rebs: Kherrazi 10; Asts: Maxhuni 5 PIR: Mounce 21	Arena: MartiniPlaza; Attendance: 2,700

14 May 2022 Game 3	Heroes Den Bosch	81–72	Donar	's-Hertogenbosch
20:00	Scoring by quarter: 14–20, 30–14, 15–20, 22–18
	Pts: Maxhuni 17; Rebs: Mounce 8 Asts: Maxhuni 7 PIR: Mounce 22	Boxscore	Pts: Addison 17; Rebs: Caruso 8 Asts: Luke 7 PIR: Egekeze 21	Arena: Maaspoort; Attendance: 2,000

=== BNXT Playoffs ===
==== Third Round ====
20 May 2022 Game 1	Limburg United	70–78	Donar	Limburg
20:00	Scoring by quarter: 13–19, 23–15, 11–24, 23–20
	Pts: Delalieux 16; Rebs: Delalieux 7 Asts: Hammonds 6 PIR: Nelson 16	Boxscore	Pts: Addison 15; Rebs: Koenis 7 Asts: Caruso, Koenis 3 PIR: Koenis 18	Arena: Sporthal Alverberg

24 May 2022 Game 2	Donar	110–88 (188–158 agg.)	Limburg United	Groningen
20:00	Scoring by quarter: 21–20, 28–27, 34–18, 27–23
	Pts: Koenis 19; Rebs: Koenis 8 Asts: Luke 9 PIR: Koenis 26	Boxscore	Pts: Delalieux 22; Rebs: Nelson 6 Asts: Hammonds 6 PIR: Delalieux 16	Arena: MartiniPlaza; Attendance: 4,000

==== Fourth Round ====
28 May 2022 Game 1	Donar	97–63	Telenet Giants Antwerp	Groningen
20:00	Scoring by quarter: 29–24, 19–9, 25–15, 24–15
	Pts: Ingram 19; Rebs: Koenis 8 Asts: Luke 9 PIR: Luke 21	Boxscore	Pts: Tiby 18; Rebs: Tiby 9 Asts: Van Den Eynde 4 PIR: Tiby 24	Arena: MartiniPlaza; Referees: 2,700

30 May 2022 Game 2	Telenet Giants Antwerp	102–88 (185–165 agg.)	Donar	Antwerp
20:00	Scoring by quarter: 22–22, 22–18, 26–24, 32–24
	Pts: Hands 22; Rebs: Rogiers, Tiby 5 Asts: Tiby 6 PIR: Hands 23	Boxscore	Pts: Ingram 23; Rebs: Caruso 6 Asts: Luke 6 PIR: Ingram 20	Arena: Lotto Arena; Attendance: 563

==== Quarterfinals ====
1 June 2022 Game 1	Donar	84–86	Kangoeroes Mechelen	Groningen
20:00	Scoring by quarter: 20–18, 17–29, 29–22, 18–17
	Pts: Brandwijk 15; Rebs: Caruso 6 Asts: Koenis 5 PIR: Caruso 14	Boxscore	Pts: Loubry, Stephens 20; Rebs: Stephens 8 Asts: Loubry 5 PIR: Stephens 25	Arena: MartiniPlaza; Attendance: 2,500

3 June 2022 Game 2	Kangoeroes Mechelen	85–89 (173–171 agg.)	Donar	Mechelen
20:00	Scoring by quarter: 20–21, 27–20, 25–22, 13–26
	Pts: Alston 16; Rebs: Palinckx 6 Asts: Loubry 8 PIR: Loubry 19	Boxscore	Pts: Koenis 24; Rebs: Koenis 12; Asts: Williams 6 PIR: Koenis 40	Arena: Winketkaai; Attendance: 200

==== Semifinals ====
5 June 2022 Game 1	Donar	68–68	Heroes Den Bosch	Groningen
15:00	Scoring by quarter: 13–22, 16–16, 26–17, 13–13
	Pts: Thomas 13; Rebs: Koenis 9 Asts: Ingram, Williams 3 PIR: Thomas 18	Boxscore	Pts: Maxhuni 17; Rebs: Kherrazi 8 Asts: Kherrazi 4 PIR: Lautier-Ogunleye 15	Arena: MartiniPlaza; Attendance: 3,000

7 June 2022 Game 2	Heroes Den Bosch	100–101 (169–168 agg.)	Donar	's-Hertogenbosch
20:00	Scoring by quarter: 19–19, 28–27, 28–32, 25–23
	Pts: Mounce 23; Rebs: Kherrazi 7 Asts: Maxhuni 7 PIR: Maxhuni 26	Boxscore	Pts: Luke 31; Rebs: Koenis 7 Asts: Luke 9 PIR: Luke 33	Arena: Maaspoort

==== Finals ====
9 June 2022 Game 1	Donar	72–75	ZZ Leiden	Groningen
20:00	Scoring by quarter: 21–14, 18–20, 20–30, 13–11
	Pts: Williams 15; Rebs: Koenis 8 Asts: Williams 4 PIR: Koenis 19	Boxscore	Pts: Mikalauskas 19; Rebs: Mikalauskas 6 Asts: de Jong 6 PIR: Mikalauskas 20	Arena: MartiniPlaza; Attendance: 3,600

11 June 2022 Game 2	ZZ Leiden	71–70 (142–146 agg.)	Donar	Leiden
20:00	Scoring by quarter: 6–20, 13–15, 22–19, 30–16
	Pts: de Jong 18; Rebs: de Jong 10; Asts: Ververs 2 PIR: de Jong, Olisemeka 17	Boxscore	Pts: Addison 13; Rebs: Brandwijk, Williams 6 Asts: Luke, Williams 3 PIR: Brandwijk 16	Arena: Vijf Meihal; Attendance: 3,000

== Basketball Cup ==
On 20 March 2022, Donar won its seventh Dutch Basketball Cup title, tying the record held by Heroes Den Bosch for cup most titles.

=== Eightfinals ===
11 December 2021	CobraNova	57–103	Donar	Voorburg
14:00
		Report		Arena: Forum Kwadraat

=== Quarterfinals ===
16 January 2022	Landstede Hammers	73–85	Donar	Zwolle
14:00	Scoring by quarter: 13–16, 21–25, 22–25, 17–19
	Pts: De Pagter 18; Rebs: Þorbjarnarson 12; Asts: Echols 7	Boxscore	Pts: Addison 18; Rebs: Egekeze 6 Asts: Addison, Williams 5	Arena: Landstede Sportcentrum; Attendance: 1

1 February 2022	Donar	71–79OT (156–152 agg.)	Landstede Hammers	Groningen
19:00	Scoring by quarter: 19–12, 10–12, 18–27, 10–6, Overtime: 10–6
	Pts: Addison 17; Rebs: Brandwijk 11; Asts: Addison, Gavin 4 PIR: Addison 22	Boxscore	Pts: Echols 26; Rebs: De Pagter 15; Asts: Schilder 5 PIR: Echols 26	Arena: MartiniPlaza; Attendance: 1,000

=== Semifinals ===
10 February 2022	Donar	91–58	Aris Leeuwarden	Groningen
19:30
				Arena: MartiniPlaza

13 February 2022	Aris Leeuwarden	70–80 (171–128 agg.)	Donar	Leeuwarden
16:00
				Arena: Kalverdijkje

=== Final ===
20 March 2022	Donar	76–71	Heroes Den Bosch	Groningen
15:00	Scoring by quarter: 25–25, 16–15, 23–23, 12–8
NPO 1	Pts: Austin Luke, Jimmy Gavin 15; Rebs: Henry Caruso 9 Asts: Austin Luke 8	Boxscore	Pts: Austin Price 21; Rebs: Mike Carlson 7 Asts: Edon Maxhuni 5	Arena: MartiniPlaza; Attendance: 4,100; Referees: Tijmen Last, Mo Shouman, Stan Kestein

== FIBA Europe Cup ==
=== Qualification tournament ===
Donar played in the qualification tournament for the 2021–22 FIBA Europe Cup, and was also awarded to host the tournament. Donar lost the final of the qualification to Benfica, but advanced as a Lucky Loser.

==== Qualification semifinal ====
29 September 2021 Semifinal	Swans Gmunden (Austria)	53–80	(Netherlands) Donar	Groningen
19:30	Scoring by quarter: 12–22, 17–14, 15–30, 9–14
	Pts: Blazan 12; Rebs: Aughburns 8 Asts: Anderson; PIR: Aughburns, 12	Boxscore	Pts: Nwogbo 22; Rebs: Nwogbo, Ingram 9 Asts: Luke 7 PIR: Nwogbo, 29	Arena: MartiniPlaza

==== Qualification final ====
1 October 2021 Final	Donar (Netherlands)	73–81	(Portugal) Benfica	Groningen
20:00	Scoring by quarter: 17–22, 15–15, 20–22, 21–22
	Pts: Nwogbo 17; Rebs: Nwogbo 7 Asts: Luke 9 PIR: Nwogbo 19	Boxscore	Pts: Ben Romdhane 19; Rebs: Clifford 7 Asts: Barbosa 7 PIR: Ben Romdhane 23	Arena: MartiniPlaza

=== Regular season ===
Donar was drawn into Group A of the regular season, where it faced three opponents which it never faced before.

Pos	Team	Pld	W	L	PF	PA	PD	Pts	Qualification
1	(Germany) Medi Bayreuth	6	5	1	516	443	+73	11	Advance to second round
2	(United Kingdom) London Lions	6	5	1	501	444	+57	11	Advance to second round
3	(Netherlands) Donar	6	2	4	426	463	−37	8	
4	(Austria) Kapfenberg Bulls	6	0	6	432	525	−93	6	

Source: Groups Standings

13 October 2021 1	Donar (Netherlands)	60–79	(United Kingdom) London Lions	Groningen
	Scoring by quarter: 13–13, 9–26, 22–21, 16–19
	Pts: Nwogbo 13; Rebs: Williams 7 Asts: Addison 8 PIR: Egekeze 13	Boxscore	Pts: Teague 22; Rebs: Washburn 11; Asts: Reese 8 PIR: Teague 25	Arena: MartiniPlaza

19 October 2021 2	Donar (Netherlands)	64–71	(Germany) Medi Bayreuth	Groningen
20:00	Scoring by quarter: 12–22, 19–17, 18–19, 15–13
	Pts: Caruso 20; Rebs: Caruso 10; Asts: Williams 8 PIR: Caruso 18	Boxscore	Pts: Sajus 22; Rebs: Allen 11; Asts: Doreth 5 PIR: Sajus 32	Arena: MartiniPlaza

27 October 2021 3	Kapfenberg Bulls (Austria)	85–89OT	(Netherlands) Donar	Kapfenberg
18:00	Scoring by quarter: 19–21, 16–14, 18–19, 23–22, Overtime: 9–13
	Pts: Jamar 18; Rebs: Jamar 7 Asts: Scott 9 PIR: Jamar 23	Boxscore	Pts: Caruso 22; Rebs: Caruso 14; Asts: Koenis 6 PIR: Caruso 33	Arena: Walfersamhalle

3 November 2021 4	London Lions (United Kingdom)	85–67	(Netherlands) Donar	London
20:30	Scoring by quarter: 16–18, 16–19, 29–14, 24–16
	Pts: Teague 17; Rebs: Washburn, Kelley 8 Asts: Teague 6 PIR: Teague 23	Boxscore	Pts: Egekeze, Addison 19; Rebs: Brandwijk 9 Asts: Williams 10; PIR: Egekeze 20	Arena: Copper Box

10 November 2021 5	Medi Bayreuth (Germany)	84–61	(Netherlands) Donar	Bayreuth
20:00	Scoring by quarter: 24–11, 20–25, 22–13, 18–12
	Pts: Wells 18; Rebs: Seiferth 8 Asts: Wells 7 PIR: Wells 26	Boxscore	Pts: Caruso, Addison 13; Rebs: Caruso 9 Asts: Williams 5 PIR: Caruso 14	Arena: Oberfrankenhalle

17 November 2021 6	Donar (Netherlands)	85–59	(Austria) Kapfenberg Bulls	Groningen
19:30	Scoring by quarter: 21–18, 23–19, 24–18, 17–4
	Pts: Ingram 16; Rebs: Caruso 7 Asts: Williams 6 PIR: Caruso 18	Boxscore	Pts: Briggs 15; Rebs: Briggs 7 Asts: Jamar 4 PIR: Briggs 17	Arena: MartiniPlaza; Referees: Vilius Mačiulaitis, Hrvoje Ćavar, Polat Parlak

== Statistics ==
Legend
GP	Games played	GS	Games started	MPG	Minutes per game	RPG	Rebounds per game
APG	Assists per game	SPG	Steals per game	BPG	Blocks per game	PPG	Points per game
FG%	Field-goal percentage	3P%	3-point field-goal percentage	FT%	Free-throw percentage	TO	Turnovers per game
PF	Fouls per game		Team leader		League leader

=== BNXT League ===
Player	GP	MPG	FG%	3P%	FT%	RPG	APG	SPG	BPG	PPG
Marquis Addison	42	25.0	.456	.380	.747	3.0	2.3	1.3	0.1	12.3
Henry Caruso	32	23.3	.500	.347	.683	6.5	1.3	0.6	0.1	10.3
Lotanna Nwogbo	27	17.1	.520	.000	.663	4.9	1.1	0.7	0.8	10.3
Donte Ingram	39	20.9	.452	.289	.712	3.2	0.9	0.7	0.1	9.2
Jimmy Gavin	34	19.5	.434	.370	.709	1.1	2.8	0.5	0.0	9.2
Amanze Egekeze	42	21.3	.526	.355	.813	3.8	0.9	0.7	0.2	8.6
Austin Luke	25	24.6	.385	.324	.655	2.3	5.4	0.9	0.0	8.5
Leon Williams	41	27.7	.457	.380	.696	2.2	3.9	0.8	0.1	8.0
Donte Thomas	34	20.6	.491	.273	.543	4.6	1.0	0.6	0.1	7.2
Thomas Koenis	30	19.3	.601	.385	.605	5.9	1.8	0.6	0.4	6.8
Willem Brandwijk	43	18.0	.519	.333	.613	5.0	1.0	0.5	0.6	6.7
Sheyi Adetunji	17	9.1	.239	.219	.500	1.0	0.5	0.5	0.1	1.9
Kjeld Zuidema	14	6.3	.370	.125	.500	0.9	0.7	0.2	0.1	1.6
Mark Roorda	6	3.9	.000	.000	.500	0.7	0.0	0.3	0.0	0.3
