= 2022 BNXT Finals =

Donar	ZZ Leiden
142	146
Head coach: Matthew Otten	Head coach: Geert Hammink
- Date: 9 June 2022
- Venue: MartiniPlaza, Groningen
- MVP: Worthy de Jong
- Date: 11 June 2022
- Venue: Vijf Meihal, Leiden

The 2022 BNXT Finals were the concluding series of the 2021–22 BNXT League, the inaugural season of the Dutch-Belgian basketball competition. The series was played in a two-legged format with the team with the highest aggregate points winning the title.

ZZ Leiden won both games to be crowned the inaugural BNXT champion. Worthy de Jong won Finals MVP, and retired from professional basketball after the finals series.

== Venues ==
Groningen	Leiden
MartiniPlaza	Vijf Meihal
Capacity: 4,350	Capacity: 2,000

== Road to the finals ==
Donar				Round	ZZ Leiden			
Opponent	Home	Away	Acore	Group phase	Opponent	Home	Away	Score
2nd of 11 (17–3)				Domestic phase	3rd of 11 (14–6)			
3rd (6–4)				Cross-border	7th (5–5)			
Opponent	Home	Away	Score	BNXT Playoffs	Opponent	Home	Away	Score
Limburg United	110–88	70–78	188–158 (+30)	Third round	bye			
Telenet Giants Antwerp	97–63	88–102	185–165 (+20)	Fourth round	bye			
Kangoeroes Mechelen	84–86	89–85	173–171 (+2)	Quarterfinals	Leuven Bears	81–59	68–82	149–141 (+8)
Heroes Den Bosch	68–68	101–100	169–168 (+1)	Semifinals	BC Oostende	84–82	88–78	172–160 (+12)

== Games ==
=== First leg ===
9 June 2022	Donar	72–75	ZZ Leiden	MartiniPlaza
20:00	Scoring by quarter: 21–14, 18–20, 20–30, 13–11
Ziggo Sport; Sporza	Pts: Leon Williams 15; Rebs: Thomas Koenis 8 Asts: Leon Williams 4 Eff: Leon Williams 15	Boxscore	Pts: Arūnas Mikalauskas 19; Rebs: Arūnas Mikalauskas 6 Asts: Worthy de Jong 6 Eff: Arūnas Mikalauskas 20	Arena: MartiniPlaza; Attendance: 3,600

=== Second leg ===
11 June 2022	ZZ Leiden	71–70	Donar	Leiden
20:00	Scoring by quarter: 6–20, 13–15, 22–19, 30–16
Ziggo Sport; Sporza	Pts: Worthy de Jong 18; Rebs: De Jong, Olisemeka 10 each Asts: Marijn Ververs 2 Eff: Worthy de Jong 18	Boxscore	Pts: Marquis Addison 10; Rebs: Williams, Brandwijk 6 each Asts: Austin Luke 3 Eff: Willem Brandwijk 16	Arena: Vijf Meihal; Attendance: 3,000

== Rosters ==
=== Donar ===
Donar roster
Players
Coaches

Pos.	No.	Nat.	Name	Ht.	Wt.	Age
PF	0	(United States)	Thomas, Donte	2.01 m (6 ft 7 in)	102 kg (225 lb)	28 – 6 May 1996
PG	1	(United States)	Luke, Austin	1.91 m (6 ft 3 in)	93 kg (205 lb)	30 – 27 October 1994
SF	2	(United States)	Ingram, Donte	1.98 m (6 ft 6 in)	98 kg (216 lb)	28 – 15 August 1996
PG	5	(Netherlands)	Williams, Leon	1.89 m (6 ft 2 in)	75 kg (165 lb)	33 – 25 July 1991
G	6	(Netherlands)	Adetunji, Sheyi	1.87 m (6 ft 2 in)		25 – 11 September 1999
PG	9	(United States)	Gavin, Jimmy	1.91 m (6 ft 3 in)	88 kg (194 lb)	33 – 28 August 1991
PF	12	(Nigeria)	Egekeze, Amanze	2.03 m (6 ft 8 in)	100 kg (220 lb)	29 – 3 December 1995
C	14	(Netherlands)	Koenis, Thomas (C)	2.10 m (6 ft 11 in)	103 kg (227 lb)	35 – 11 December 1989
PF	19	(Netherlands)	Brandwijk, Willem	2.06 m (6 ft 9 in)	100 kg (220 lb)	29 – 31 July 1995
SF	21	(United States)	Caruso, Henry	1.93 m (6 ft 4 in)	95 kg (209 lb)	29 – 1 July 1995
C	24	(Nigeria)	Nwogbo, Lotanna (injured)	2.03 m (6 ft 8 in)	116 kg (256 lb)	31 – 30 May 1993
PF	27	(Netherlands)	Roorda, Mark (injured)	1.98 m (6 ft 6 in)		22 – 20 November 2002
F	32	(Netherlands)	Zuidema, Kjeld	1.95 m (6 ft 5 in)	90 kg (198 lb)	23 – 21 June 2001
SG	34	(United States)	Addison, Marquis	1.96 m (6 ft 5 in)	82 kg (181 lb)	33 – 6 December 1991

Head coach

- (United States) Matthew Otten

Assistant coach(es)

- (Netherlands) Jan Stalman

Legend

- (C) Team captain
- (DP) Development player
- (I) Import player
- Injured

- Roster
Updated: June 11, 2022

=== ZZ Leiden ===
ZZ Leiden roster
Players
Coaches

Pos.	No.	Nat.	Name	Ht.	Wt.	Age
SF	0	(Lithuania)	Mikalauskas, Arūnas	2.04 m (6 ft 8 in)	97 kg (214 lb)	27 – 14 September 1997
PG	2	(Netherlands)	Bouwknecht, Maarten	1.88 m (6 ft 2 in)		30 – 14 December 1994
C	3	(Denmark)	Midtgaard, Asbjørn	2.13 m (7 ft 0 in)	122 kg (269 lb)	27 – 20 September 1997
PG	4	(Netherlands)	Windt, Jamayro	1.82 m (6 ft 0 in)		23 – 17 April 2001
G	5	(Netherlands)	Ververs, Marijn (C)	1.94 m (6 ft 4 in)		26 – 17 July 1998
G/F	6	(Netherlands)	de Jong, Worthy	1.94 m (6 ft 4 in)	84 kg (185 lb)	37 – 14 March 1988
PF	7	(Lithuania)	Tubutis, Einaras	2.07 m (6 ft 9 in)	90 kg (198 lb)	26 – 4 November 1998
PF	9	(Netherlands)	Tjon Affo, Quincy	2.03 m (6 ft 8 in)		24 – 13 August 2000
C	10	(Netherlands)	van 't Hoff, Mees	2.08 m (6 ft 10 in)		23 – 27 April 2001
G/F	11	(Netherlands)	Jonathan, Kevin	2.01 m (6 ft 7 in)		22 – 24 July 2002
SG	12	(United States)	Dunn, Jhonathan	1.93 m (6 ft 4 in)		27 – 17 February 1998
F	13	(Netherlands)	van Bree, Luuk	2.06 m (6 ft 9 in)	102 kg (225 lb)	29 – 24 February 1996
C	15	(Nigeria)	Olisemeka, Peter	2.05 m (6 ft 9 in)		33 – 9 December 1991

Head coach

- (Netherlands) Geert Hammink

Assistant coach(es)

- (Netherlands) Stefan Philips

Strength & conditioning coach(es)

- (Netherlands) Johan van der Bent
- (Netherlands) Jasper Haasnoot

Physiotherapist(s)

- (Netherlands) Arjen van de Paverd
- (Netherlands) Erik van der Pot

Team manager

- (Netherlands) Bart Kriek

Legend

- (C) Team captain
- (DP) Development player
- (I) Import player
- Injured

- Roster
Updated: June 11, 2022
