= 2022–23 Donar (basketball club) season =

Donar
2022–23 season
- Chairman: Jannes Stokroos
- Head coach: Matthew Otten (2nd season)
- Arena: MartiniPlaza
- FIBA Europe Cup: TBD

The 2022–23 Donar season is the 51st season in the existence of the club. The club will play its second season of the BNXT League.

Donar will play in the regular season of the 2022–23 FIBA Europe Cup, having qualified as winners of the national cup.

From this season, Drago Pašalić is the new technical director of the club.

== Players ==
=== Squad information ===
Squad no.	Name	Nationality	Position(s)	Height	Date of birth (age)	Signed	Signed from	Contract till
5	Leon Williams	(Netherlands)	PG	1.89 m	25 July 1991 (age 35)	2019	(Netherlands) Den Helder Suns	2023
19	Willem Brandwijk	(Netherlands)	C	2.06 m	31 July 1995 (age 31)	2020	(Netherlands) Feyenoord	2024
23	Charles Callison	(United States)	PG	1.85 m	17 October 1995 (age 30)	2022	(Germany) S.Oliver Würzburg	2023
27	Mark Roorda	(Netherlands)	PF	1.98 m	20 November 2002 (age 23)	2021	(Netherlands) Donar U-22	2023
32	Kjeld Zuidema	(Netherlands)	F	1.95 m	21 June 2001 (age 25)	2020	(Netherlands) Donar U-22	2023
7	Sander Hollanders	(Netherlands)	SG	1.94 m	13 September 2001 (age 25)	2022	(Netherlands) BAL	2024
30	Olaf Schaftenaar	(Netherlands)	PF	2.08 m	15 May 1993 (age 33)	2022	(Romania) Sibiu	2023
61	Clay Mounce	(United States)	PF	2.01 m	12 March 1998 (age 28)	2022	(Netherlands) Heroes Den Bosch	2023
35	Ronalds Zaķis	(Latvia)	C	2.07 m	8 July 1987 (age 39)	2022	(Estonia) Viimsi	2023

== Transactions ==
=== Additions ===
Name	Date	From
Sander Hollanders	29 June 2022	(Netherlands) BAL
Ronalds Zaķis	13 July 2022	(Estonia) Viimsi
Olaf Schaftenaar	10 July 2022	(Romania) Sibiu
Clay Mounce	15 July 2022	(Netherlands) Heroes Den Bosch
Charles Callison	26 July 2022	(Germany) S.Oliver Würzburg
Viktor Gaddefors	11 November 2022	(Romania) Dinamo București

=== Out ===
No.	Pos.	Nat.	Name	Age	Moving to		Type	Date	Source
12	PF	(Nigeria)	Amanze Egekeze	26	Kataja	(Finland)	End of contract	August 4, 2022	
21	F	(United States)	Henry Caruso	27	Élan Chalon	(France)	End of contract	July 23, 2022	
0	F	(United States)	Donte Thomas	26	Heroes Den Bosch	(Netherlands)	End of contract	July 29, 2022	
1	PG	(United States)	Austin Luke	27	Helios Suns	(Slovenia)	End of contract	August 24, 2022	
2	G	(United States)	Donte Ingram	25	Dinamo București	(Romania)	End of contract	August 28, 2022	
9	G	(United States)	Jimmy Gavin	29	Szolnoki Olaj KK	(Hungary)	End of contract	August 15, 2022	
6	G	(Netherlands)	Sheyi Adetunji	22			End of contract		
24	C	(Nigeria)	Lotanna Nwogbo	29			End of contract		
34	SG	(United States)	Marquis Addison	30	Dinamo București	(Romania)	End of contract	August 15, 2022	
23	PG	(United States)	Charles Callison	27	Free agent		Mutual agreement	November 12, 2022	
26	PF	(Latvia)	Artjoms Butjankovs	31	Free agent		Mutual agreement	November 12, 2022	

=== Retirements ===
Name	Date
Thomas Koenis	25 June

=== Extensions ===
Name	Date
Willem Brandwijk	22 June
Mark Roorda	23 June
Kjeld Zuidema	24 June

== Pre-season ==
Date	Opponents	H / A	Score	Top scorer (points)	Top rebounder	Top assists
21 August	(Germany) EWE Baskets Oldenburg	H	L 50–91	Callison & Kačinas (11)	Zaķis (6)	Callison (6)
27 August	(Germany) Rasta Vechta	A	L 87–68	Zaķis (16)	Brandwijk (8)	Callison (3)
2 September	(Germany) Eisbären Bremerhaven	N	L 58–80			
9 September	(United Kingdom) Leicester Riders	A	L 80–75			
11 September	(United Kingdom) Leicester Riders	A	L 69–61			
16 September	(Belgium) Kangoeroes Mechelen	A				
18 September	(Belgium) Telenet Giants Antwerp	A				
24 September	(Netherlands) Feyenoord Basketball	N				

Key

- H: Home game
- A: Away game
- N: Neutral
