= 2022 BNXT League Dutch Playoffs =

Tournament details
- Country: Netherlands
- Dates: 3–29 May 2022
- Teams: 6

Final positions
- Champions: Heroes Den Bosch
- Runner-up: ZZ Leiden
- Semifinalists: Donar; Landstede Hammers

The 2022 BNXT League Dutch Playoffs is the national playoffs of the Netherlands as part of the 2021–22 BNXT League season. The playoffs will determine which team is crowned the Dutch national basketball champion. Eliminated teams advance to the BNXT Playoffs, were they play for the BNXT title. The playoffs started on 3 May 2022.

== Playoff qualifying ==
Seed	Team	Domestic Phase record	International Phase record
1	ZZ Leiden	17–3	6–4
2	Heroes Den Bosch	18–2	4–6
3	Donar	14–6	5–5
4	Landstede Hammers	14–6	0–10
5	Feyenoord	10–10	0–10
6	Aris Leeuwarden	9–11	5–5

== Bracket ==
Quarterfinals; 3–7 May
4	Landstede Hammers	2
5	Feyenoord	0
3	Donar	2
6	Aris Leeuwarden	1

Semifinals; 10–14 May
1	ZZ Leiden	3
4	Landstede Hammers	0
2	Heroes Den Bosch	3
3	Donar	0

Finals; 21–29 May
1	ZZ Leiden	2
2	Heroes Den Bosch	3

== Quarterfinals ==
The semifinals were played in a best-of-three format.

=== Donar vs Aris Leeuwarden ===
3 May 2022	Donar	69–72	Aris Leeuwarden	Groningen
19:30	Scoring by quarter: 20–18, 16–20, 20–22, 13–12
	Pts: Thomas 12; Rebs: Koenis 6 Asts: Gavin 4 PIR: Thomas 17	Boxscore	Pts: Brock 19; Rebs: Pruitt 8 Asts: Brock 5 PIR: Brock 21	Arena: MartiniPlaza; Attendance: 2,600

5 May 2022	Aris Leeuwarden	62–99	Donar	Leeuwarden
20:00	Scoring by quarter: 13–33, 7–27, 20–22, 22–17
	Pts: Pruitt 13; Rebs: Doorson 7 Asts: Brock 4 PIR: Pruitt 17	Boxscore	Pts: Addison 15; Rebs: Caruso 8 Asts: Gavin, Luke 6 PIR: Caruso 20	Arena: Kalverdijkje

7 May 2022	Donar	99–82	Aris Leeuwarden	Groningen
20:00	Scoring by quarter: 28–21, 17–18, 25–25, 29–18
	Pts: Addison 25; Rebs: Brandwijk 14; Asts: three players 5 PIR: three players 21	Boxscore	Pts: Cooper 20; Rebs: Cooper, Pruitt 5 Asts: Logan 8 PIR: Logan 25	Arena: MartiniPlaza; Attendance: 2,800

=== Landstede Hammers vs Feyenoord ===
3 May 2022	Landstede Hammers	88–79	Feyenoord	Zwolle
20:00	Scoring by quarter: 24–18, 15–15, 30–26, 19–22
	Pts: Diculescu 22; Rebs: De Pagter 7 Asts: Schilder 8 PIR: Echols 22	Boxscore	Pts: Rhodes 30; Rebs: Rhodes 9 Asts: Bruining 4 PIR: Rhodes 30	Arena: Landstede Sportcentrum; Attendance: 500

5 May 2022	Feyenoord	71–81	Landstede Hammers	Rotterdam
19:00	Scoring by quarter: 17–11, 14–26, 19–20, 21–24
	Pts: Wellian 18; Rebs: Stolk 9 Asts: Sow 4 PIR: Stolk 17	Boxscore	Pts: Dahlman 27; Rebs: Þorbjarnarson 13; Asts: Þorbjarnarson 8 PIR: Dahlman 25	Arena: Topsportcentrum Rotterdam; Attendance: 125

== Semifinals ==
The semifinals were played in a best-of-five format.

=== Heroes Den Bosch vs Donar ===
10 May 2022 Game 1	Heroes Den Bosch	77–65	Donar	's-Hertogenbosch
20:00	Scoring by quarter: 19–11, 18–23, 23–17, 17–14
	Pts: Maxhuni 22; Rebs: Kherrazi 12; Asts: Maxhuni 5 PIR: Maxhuni, van der Mars 20	Boxscore	Pts: Egekeze 12; Rebs: Thomas 7 Asts: Luke 8 PIR: Egekeze 12	Arena: Maaspoort; Attendance: 1,200

12 May 2022 Game 2	Donar	67–73	Heroes Den Bosch	Groningen
20:00	Scoring by quarter: 11–16, 17–22, 20–20, 19–15
	Pts: Addison 16; Rebs: Caruso 9 Asts: Luke 4 PIR: Caruso 16	Boxscore	Pts: Hammink 20; Rebs: Kherrazi 10; Asts: Maxhuni 5 PIR: Mounce 21	Arena: MartiniPlaza; Attendance: 2,700

14 May 2022 Game 3	Heroes Den Bosch	81–72	Donar	's-Hertogenbosch
20:00	Scoring by quarter: 14–20, 30–14, 15–20, 22–18
	Pts: Maxhuni 17; Rebs: Mounce 8 Asts: Maxhuni 7 PIR: Mounce 22	Boxscore	Pts: Addison 17; Rebs: Caruso 8 Asts: Luke 7 PIR: Egekeze 21	Arena: Maaspoort; Attendance: 2,000

=== ZZ Leiden vs Landstede Hammers ===
10 May 2022 Game 1	ZZ Leiden	91–79	Landstede Hammers	Leiden
20:00	Scoring by quarter: 24–15, 17–21, 29–19, 21–24
	Pts: Dunn 29; Rebs: Dunn 6 Asts: Tubutis 5 PIR: Dunn 29	Boxscore	Pts: Echols 24; Rebs: Bleeker 12; Asts: Bleeker, Echols 4 PIR: Echols 23	Arena: Vijf Meihal; Attendance: 1,436

12 May 2022 Game 1	Landstede Hammers	79–89	ZZ Leiden	Zwolle
19:30	Scoring by quarter: 26–26, 22–19, 14–24, 17–20
	Pts: Dahlman 30; Rebs: Four players 5 Asts: Diculescu, Echols 6 PIR: Dahlman 32	Boxscore	Pts: Dunn 25; Rebs: Midtgaard 8 Asts: De Jong 6 PIR: Dunn 24	Arena: Landstede Sportcentrum; Attendance: 500

14 May 2022 Game 3	ZZ Leiden	71–69	Landstede Hammers	Leiden
20:00	Scoring by quarter: 23–14, 18–16, 10–20, 20–19
	Pts: Midtgaard 16; Rebs: Midtgaard 12; Asts: Ververs 8 PIR: Ververs 25	Boxscore	Pts: Echols 22; Rebs: de Pagter 6 Asts: three players 4 PIR: Echols 17	Arena: Vijf Meihal; Attendance: 1,967

== Final ==
The finals will be played in a best of five format.

=== ZZ Leiden vs Heroes Den Bosch ===
21 May 2022 Game 1	ZZ Leiden	83–92	Heroes Den Bosch	Leiden
20:00	Scoring by quarter: 21–25, 22–22, 26–22, 14–23
	Pts: Bouwknecht 19; Rebs: Tubutis 6 Asts: Ververs 7 PIR: Tubutis 15	Boxscore	Pts: Price 28; Rebs: Kherrazi 10; Asts: Kherrazi 7 PIR: Price 22	Arena: Vijf Meihal; Attendance: 2,366; Referees: Tijmen Last (crewchief), Mohamed Shouman (umpire) & Stan Kestein (umpire)

23 May 2022 Game 2	Heroes Den Bosch	74–90	ZZ Leiden	's-Hertogenbosch
20:00	Scoring by quarter: 10–23, 23–24, 19–18, 22–25
	Pts: Mounce 22; Rebs: van der Mars 10; Asts: van Vliet 5 PIR: Mounce 22	Boxscore	Pts: Dunn 25; Rebs: Tubutis 8 Asts: Ververs 5 PIR: Dunn 20	Arena: Maaspoort; Attendance: 2,000; Referees: Bert van Slooten (crewchief), Nico Zwiep (umpire) & Floris Janse de Jonge (umpire)

25 May 2022 Game 3	ZZ Leiden	87–68	Heroes Den Bosch	Leiden
19:00	Scoring by quarter: 22–26, 19–18, 28–14, 18–10
	Pts: Dunn 28; Rebs: de Jong 8 Asts: Ververs 4 PIR: Dunn 27	Boxscore	Pts: Hammink 19; Rebs: Hammink, Kherrazi 7 Asts: Kherrazi 4 PIR: Hammink 22	Arena: Vijf Meihal; Attendance: 1,799; Referees: Tijmen Last (crewchief), Arnoud van Bochove (umpire) & Maurits Witvliet (umpire)

27 May 2022 Game 4	Heroes Den Bosch	61–52	ZZ Leiden	's-Hertogenbosch
20:00	Scoring by quarter: 14–17, 15–14, 16–8, 16–13
	Pts: Maxhuni 16; Rebs: Kherrazi 12; Asts: van Vliet 4 PIR: van der Mars 21	Boxscore	Pts: Dunn, Ververs 9 Rebs: Midtgaard 8 Asts: Mikalauskas 5 PIR: Ververs 13	Arena: Maaspoort; Attendance: 2,500; Referees: Bert van Slooten (crewchief), Mohamed Shouman (umpire) & Maurits Witvliet (umpire)

29 May 2022 Game 5	ZZ Leiden	74–81	Heroes Den Bosch	Leiden
15:00	Scoring by quarter: 22–17, 20–28, 11–11, 21–25
	Pts: Dunn 32; Rebs: Tubutis 7 Asts: Ververs 5 PIR: Dunn 29	Boxscore	Pts: Mounce 23; Rebs: van der Mars 16; Asts: van Vliet 7 PIR: Mounce 25	Arena: Vijf Meihal; Attendance: 2,196; Referees: Arnoud van Bochove (crewchief), Tijmen Last (umpire) & Stan Kestein (umpire)

== Winning roster ==
No.	Pos	Player
2	G	Boy van Vliet
4	F	Florian Rijkers
6	F/C	Mike Carlson
7	PG	Edon Maxhuni
9	F	Mohamed Kherrazi
10	G/F	Keime Helfrich
11	G/F	Shane Hammink
21	C	Thomas van der Mars
23	G	Dwayne Lautier-Gounleye
31	G	Austin Price
33	C	Morgan Stilma
61	PF	Clay Mounce
	HC	Erik Braal
	AC	Mike de Kraker
