= 2022–23 Heroes Den Bosch season =

Heroes Den Bosch
2022–23 season
- Owner: Bob van Oosterhout
- Head coach: Erik Braal (2nd season)
- Arena: Maaspoort
- BNXT League: TBD
- Basketball Champions League: TBD

The 2022–23 season of the Heroes Den Bosch is the 71st season of the Heroes Den Bosch, and its 2nd in the BNXT League.

Heroes will make its debut in the qualifying rounds of the Basketball Champions League.

== Roster ==
Heroes Den Bosch roster
Players
Coaches

Pos.	No.	Nat.	Name	Ht.	Age
F	1	(United States)	Thomas, Donte	2.01 m (6 ft 7 in)	30 – 6 May 1996
G	2	(Netherlands)	van Vliet, Boy	1.94 m (6 ft 4 in)	32 – 13 July 1994
PF	3	(Netherlands)	Grantsaan, Lagio	2.02 m (6 ft 8 in)	29 – 23 September 1997
PG	4	(Australia)	Naar, Emmett	1.85 m (6 ft 1 in)	32 – 3 July 1994
SF	8	(Netherlands)	Vianen, Sam (DP)	1.95 m (6 ft 5 in)	24 – 12 March 2002
PF	9	(Netherlands)	Kherrazi, Mohamed	2.00 m (6 ft 7 in)	36 – 29 June 1990
SF	10	(Netherlands)	Helfrich, Keime	1.97 m (6 ft 6 in)	29 – 5 September 1997
G	11	(United States)	Webster, Kobe	1.97 m (6 ft 6 in)	27 – 31 March 1999
C	21	(Netherlands)	van der Mars, Thomas	2.08 m (6 ft 10 in)	35 – 15 November 1990
F/C	24	(Netherlands)	Rijkers, Florian	2.07 m (6 ft 9 in)	21 – 30 August 2005
SG	25	(Norway)	Ndow, Chris-Ebou	2.01 m (6 ft 7 in)	32 – 10 December 1993
SG	31	(United States)	Price, Austin	1.93 m (6 ft 4 in)	31 – 15 September 1995
C	33	(Netherlands)	Kok, Jito	2.06 m (6 ft 9 in)	32 – 23 March 1994
PF		(Latvia)	Kohs, Verners	2.06 m (6 ft 9 in)	29 – 21 May 1997

Head coach

- (Netherlands) Erik Braal

Assistant coach(es)

- (Netherlands) Mike de Kraker

Strength & conditioning coach(es)

- (Netherlands) Rik Van Waes

Legend

- (C) Team captain
- (DP) Development player
- (I) Import player
- Injured

- Roster
- Transactions
Updated: September 9, 2022

== Transactions ==
=== Extensions ===
Player	Date	New contract	Reference
Thomas van der Mars	13 June	2 years (2024)	
Austin Price	4 July	2 years (2024)	

=== In ===
No.	Pos.	Nat.	Name	Age	Moving from		Type	Ends	Date	Source
33	C	(Netherlands)	Jito Kok	28	Spirou	(Belgium)	Free	2024	June 29, 2022	
25	G/F	(Norway)	Chris-Ebou Ndow	28	CB Coruña	(Spain)	Free	2023	July 22, 2022	
1	F	(United States)	Donte Thomas	28	Donar	(Netherlands)	Free	2023	July 28, 2022	
4	PG	(Australia)	Emmett Naar	28	Illawarra Hawks	(Australia)	Free	2023	August 1, 2022	
11	G	(United States)	Kobe Webster	24	Western Illinois (NCAA)	(United States)	College	2023	August 11, 2022	
3	PF	(Netherlands)	Lagio Grantsaan	24	Morgan State (NCAA)	(United States)	College	2023	August 21, 2022	
	PF	(Latvia)	Verner Kohs	25	Liepājas Lauvas	(Latvia)	Free	2023	September 8, 2022	

=== Out ===
No.	Pos.	Nat.	Name	Age	Moving to		Type	Date	Source
11	SG	(Netherlands)	Shane Hammink	27	Retired		Mutual consent	August 30, 2022	
7	PG	(Finland)	Edon Maxhuni	24			End of contract	July 30, 2022	
23	G/F	(United Kingdom)	Dwayne Lautier-Ogunleye	26			End of contract	July 30, 2022	
6	PF	(United States)	Mike Carlson	26	Gipuzkoa Basket	(Spain)	End of contract	July 12, 2022	
61	PF	(United States)	Clay Mounce	24	Donar	(Netherlands)	End of contract	July 15, 2022	
7	PG	(Finland)	Edon Maxhuni	24			End of contract	July 30, 2022	
33	C	(Netherlands)	Morgan Stilma	22	CB Zamora	(Spain)	End of contract	June 30, 2022	
