= Lotanna (given name) =

- Gender: Unisex
- Language: Igbo

Origin
- Origin: Nigeria
- Meaning: Remember the father
- Region of origin: Igboland

Lotanna audio is a unisex name from the Igbo tribe of Nigeria. The name means "remember the father".

== Names ==
Notable individuals with the name include:

- Lotanna Nwogbo, American-Nigerian basketball player
