= Tibor Taraš =

German basketball player (born 1997)

Free Agent
- Position: Small forward / shooting guard

Personal information
- Born: 24 September 1997 (age 29) Cologne, Germany
- Listed height: 1.98 m (6 ft 6 in)

Career information
- Playing career: 2014–present

Career history
- 2014–2018: Baunach Young Pikes
- 2018–2019: Schalke 04
- 2020–2021: RheinStars Köln
- 2021–2022: Apollo Amsterdam

Tibor Taraš (born 24 September 1997) is a German basketball player who last played for Apollo Amsterdam of the BNXT League. Standing at 1.98 m (6 ft 6 in), he plays as small forward or shooting guard.

== Professional career ==
In the 2020–21 season, Taras played for the RheinStars Köln. In the third-tier ProB league, he averaged a team-high 18.7 points per game.

On 3 August 2021, Taras signed with Apollo Amsterdam of the Dutch BNXT League. On 25 September, Taras hit a buzzer-beating game winner against The Hague Royals.
