= Kjeld Zuidema =

Dutch basketball player

No. 32 – ZZ Leiden
- Position: Small forward
- League: BNXT League

Personal information
- Born: June 21, 2001 (age 25) Eexterzandvoort, Drenthe, Netherlands
- Listed height: 6 ft 4 in (1.93 m)

Career information
- Playing career: 2020–present

Career history
- 2020–2026: Donar
- 2026–present: ZZ Leiden

Career highlights
- 2x Dutch Cup winner (2022, 2026)

Kjeld Zuidema (born June 21, 2001) is a Dutch professional basketball player for ZZ Leiden in the BNXT League.

== Professional career ==
Zuidema started his career in 2020 with Donar after coming up through its youth academy. In the first match of his professional career he was in the starting five against Almere Sailors, which was subsequently won 124–64.

In 2022, he won the first prize of the career, the Dutch Cup.

In 2023 he renewed his contract with Donar, despite the financial difficulties of the club. Due to this loyalty he was appointed as the new captain of the club.

In 2026, he won the Dutch Cup again.

On 16 July, Zuidema signed with ZZ Leiden, also playing in the BNXT League.

== International career ==
In the summer of 2025 Kjeld Zuidema made his first appearance for the Dutch national team. He played in the last match of the 2027 world cup pre-qualifying tournament. He noted 0 points, 3 rebounds and 2 steals.
