= Leon Williams (basketball, born 1991) =

Dutch basketball player

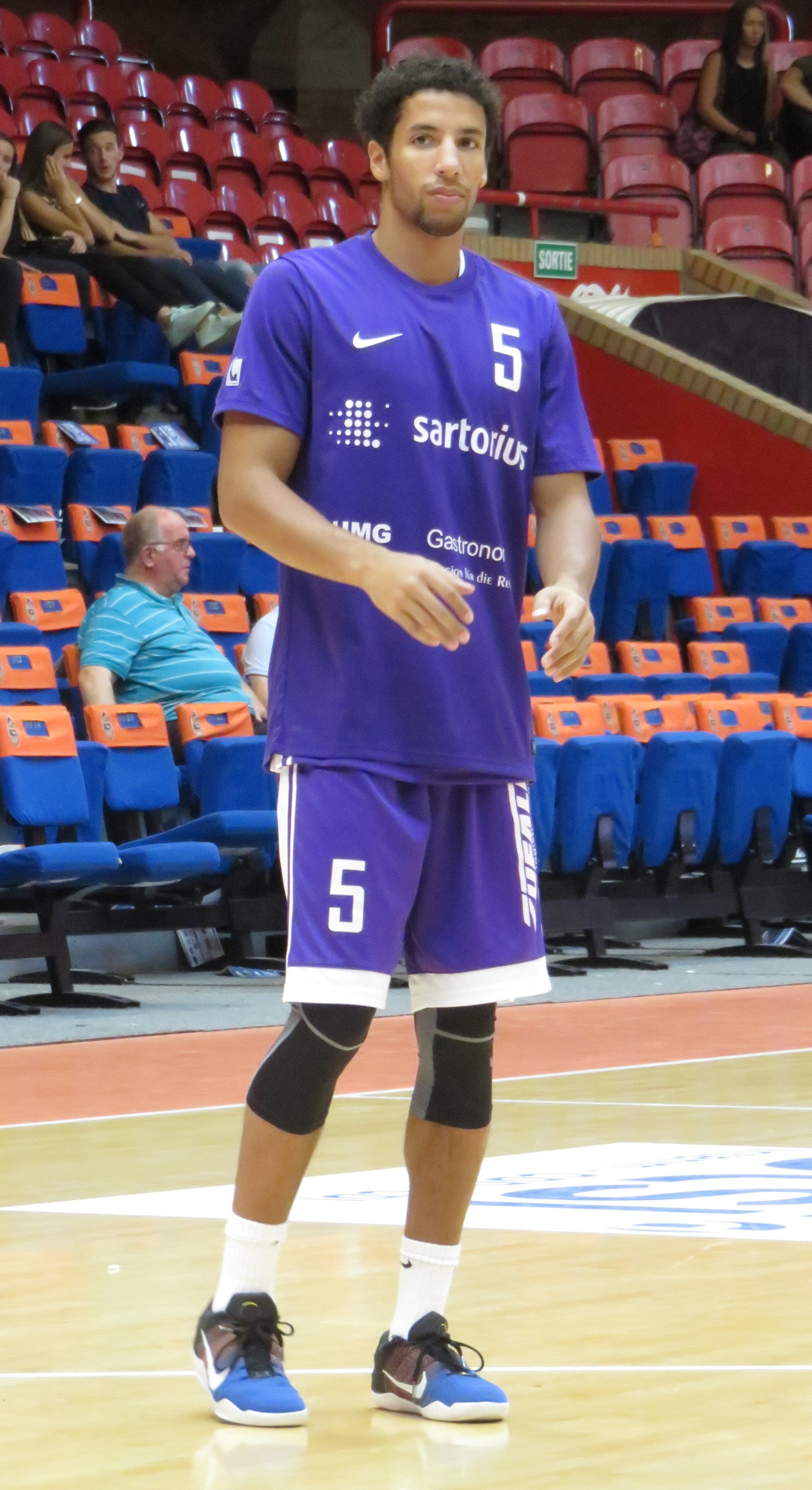
- Williams with Göttingen in 2016

No. 5 – Zeeuw & Zeeuw Rotterdam City
- Position: Point guard / shooting guard
- League: BNXT League

Personal information
- Born: 25 July 1991 (age 35) Amersfoort, Netherlands
- Listed height: 1.89 m (6 ft 2 in)
- Listed weight: 73 kg (161 lb)

Career information
- NBA draft: 2013: undrafted
- Playing career: 2010–present

Career history
- 2010–2011: West-Brabant Giants
- 2011–2012: Rotterdam
- 2012–2015: Landstede Zwolle
- 2015–2016: Den Bosch
- 2016–2018: BG Göttingen
- 2018–2019: Castelló
- 2019: Den Helder Suns
- 2019–2023: Donar
- 2020: →BG Göttingen
- 2023–2024: Libertas Livorno
- 2024–2026: Landstede Hammers
- 2026–present: Rotterdam City Basketball

Career highlights
- Dutch League champion (2026); Dutch Cup winner (2022); Dutch Supercup champion (2015); 3× DBL All-Star (2014–2016); DBL Most Improved Player (2012); DBL MVP Under 23 (2014); DBL All-Defense Team (2021)

Leon Anthony Williams (born 25 July 1991) is a Dutch professional basketball player for Zeeuw & Zeeuw Rotterdam City of the BNXT League. He is a current member of the Dutch national basketball team.

== Professional career ==
Williams started his career in Bergen op Zoom, with WCAA Giants. The season after that, he played for Rotterdam Basketbal College. In 2012, he signed with Landstede Basketbal from Zwolle. In 2013, he received the DBL Most Improved Player award. He was an DBL All-Star starter in the 2013–14 season. He also received the MVP U23 Award after the regular season.

In the 2015 offseason, Williams signed a three-year deal with SPM Shoeters Den Bosch.

On 23 June 2016, Williams signed with BG Göttingen for the 2016–17 season. Williams re-signed with Göttingen after the season. He parted ways with the team on 23 May 2018, after averaging 5.5 points per game.

On 2 September 2018, Williams signed a one-year contract with TAU Castelló of the Spanish LEB Oro.

On 25 June 2019, Williams has signed 2-year contract with Donar of the Dutch Basketball League.

On 14 May 2020, Williams signed a temporary contract with BG Göttingen of the German league. The Dutch League season had finished due to the COVID-19 pandemic.

In the 2020–21 season, Williams was named to the DBL All-Defense Team.

On December 12, 2024, he signed with Landstede Hammers of the BNXT League.

On July 18, 2026, he signed with Zeeuw & Zeeuw Rotterdam City of the BNXT League.

== Honours ==
Donar

- Dutch Basketball Cup: 2021–22

Den Bosch

- Dutch Basketball Supercup (1): 2015

=== Individual awards ===
- DBL Most Improved Player (1): 2012–13
- DBL All-Star (3): 2014, 2015, 2016
- DBL MVP Under 23 (1): 2013–14
- DBL All-Defense Team: 2020–21

== Dutch national team ==
In 2013, Williams was selected for the Dutch national basketball team by head coach Toon van Helfteren. He played as back-up point guard at the FIBA EuroBasket 2015 qualification. He averaged 5.0 points in 2 games.
