= Matthew Otten =

American basketball player and coach

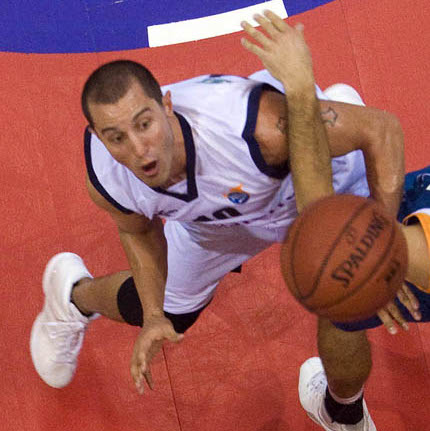
- Otten playing for GasTerra Flames in 2009

Manchester Basketball
- Title: Head coach

Personal information
- Born: December 8, 1981 (age 44) Las Vegas, Nevada, U.S.
- Listed height: 6 ft 5 in (1.96 m)

Career information
- High school: Yuba City (Yuba City, California)
- College: Yuba College (2001–2003); San Francisco State (2003–2005)
- NBA draft: 2005: undrafted
- Playing career: 2004–2015
- Position: Shooting guard
- Coaching career: 2015–present

Career history

Playing
- 2006–2007: Apollon Limassol
- 2007–2008: Cheshire Phoenix
- 2008–2009: Lugano Tigers
- 2009–2011: Donar
- 2011–2012: Mersey Tigers
- 2012–2015: Rotterdam

Coaching
- 2015–2017: Den Bosch (assistant)
- 2019–2022: Netherlands (assistant)
- 2019–2020: Dreamfield Dolphins
- 2020–2021: Yoast United
- 2021–2022: Donar
- 2024–2025: Oberwart Gunners
- 2025–present: Manchester Basketball

Career highlights
- As coach: Dutch Cup winner (2022); As player: DBL champion (2010); Dutch Cup champion (2011)

Matthew Otten (born December 8, 1981) is an American retired basketball player and current coach. He is currently serving as head coach of Manchester Basketball. Otten holds a Dutch passport as well and played the shooting guard position during his career.

== Professional career ==
Otten, who has Dutch ancestors, was raised in an US Air Force family and spent parts of his youth outside the United States. He then attended Yuba College and San Francisco State University.

He kicked off his professional career in 2006 with Apollon Limassol B.C. of Cyprus. He was part of the GasTerra Flames in 2010 and 2011, the years in which the club won a Dutch cup and national championship. In the 2011–12 season, Otten played for Mersey Tigers in the United Kingdom. In 2012 Otten returned to the Netherlands in 2012, when he signed with Rotterdam Basketbal College. After one year with the club, his contract was renewed. His numbers rose in his second season in Rotterdam, as Otten averaged 13.4 points per game compared to 9.0 the previous season. In June 2014, Otten re-signed again with Challenge Sports Rotterdam.

After the 2014–15 season, Otten retired.

== Coaching career ==
In 2015, Otten started his coaching career as an assistant with Den Bosch.

In June 2019, Otten was named an assistant coach of the Dutch men's national team, serving under Maurizio Buscaglia. He joined the team for the EuroBasket 2022 in Prague.

On 9 August 2020, Otten signed as head coach for newly established club Basketball Community Gelderland, marking his debut as head coach in the Dutch Basketball League. Later, the club was named Yoast United. With Yoast, he managed to qualify for the final of the 2021 DBL Cup where the team lost to BAL Weert.

On May 25, 2021, Otten signed a two-year contract as the head coach of Donar, with the option for a third season. On March 20, 2022, he won the Dutch Cup with Donar, guiding the team to its first trophy since 2018. In the national playoffs, Donar was swept by rival Heroes Den Bosch in the semifinals; however, the team reached the BNXT playoff finals, where they lost to ZZ Leiden.

On October 13, shortly after the start of the 2022–23 season, Otten was fired by Donar after losing the first two official games of the season.

On June 7, 2024, he was named head coach of Austrian side Oberwart Gunners. He won the Austrian Championship title in 2025. Otten left Oberwart on August 1st, 2025, to accept an offer from Manchester Basketball.

== Awards and accomplishments ==
=== As coach ===
Donar

- Dutch Cup: (2022)
- Austrian Supercup: (2024)
- Austrian Championship: (2025)

=== As player ===
Donar

- Dutch Basketball League: (2010)
- Dutch Cup: (2011)
