= Donte Ingram =

American basketball player (born 1996)

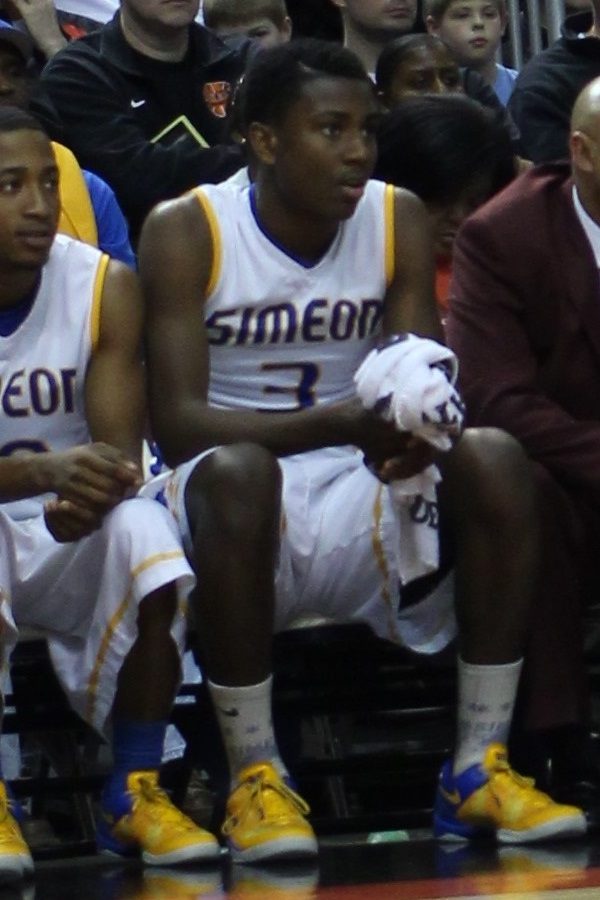
- Ingram in 2013

No. 1 – Wellington Saints
- Position: Small forward / shooting guard
- League: NZNBL

Personal information
- Born: August 15, 1996 (age 30)
- Listed height: 6 ft 6 in (1.98 m)
- Listed weight: 215 lb (98 kg)

Career information
- High school: Danville (Danville, Illinois); Simeon (Chicago, Illinois)
- College: Loyola Chicago (2014–2018)
- NBA draft: 2018: undrafted
- Playing career: 2018–present

Career history
- 2018–2019: Texas Legends
- 2019–2020: Greensboro Swarm
- 2021: Nelson Giants
- 2021–2022: Donar
- 2022–2023: Dinamo București
- 2023–2025: Al Bataeh
- 2024: Al Ahli Tripoli
- 2025–2026: Iowa Wolves
- 2026–present: Wellington Saints

Career highlights
- Dutch Cup winner (2022); Second-team All-MVC (2018); MVC tournament MVP (2018)
- Stats at Basketball Reference

Donte Ingram (born August 15, 1996) is an American professional basketball player for the Wellington Saints of the New Zealand National Basketball League (NZNBL). He played college basketball for the Loyola Ramblers. Before Loyola, he attended Simeon Career Academy and was teammates with NBA player Jabari Parker. Ingram drew national attention after helping the 2017–18 Ramblers reach the Final Four round of the 2018 NCAA tournament. He was named to the second-team All-Missouri Valley Conference as a senior.

== Early life and high school ==
Ingram was born on August 15, 1996. He is the son of Don Ingram, who played basketball in the Marines, and grew up in Danville, Illinois. In middle school he competed in Amateur Athletic Union (AAU) play for Team Trouble, alongside future Nevada player Jordan Caroline.

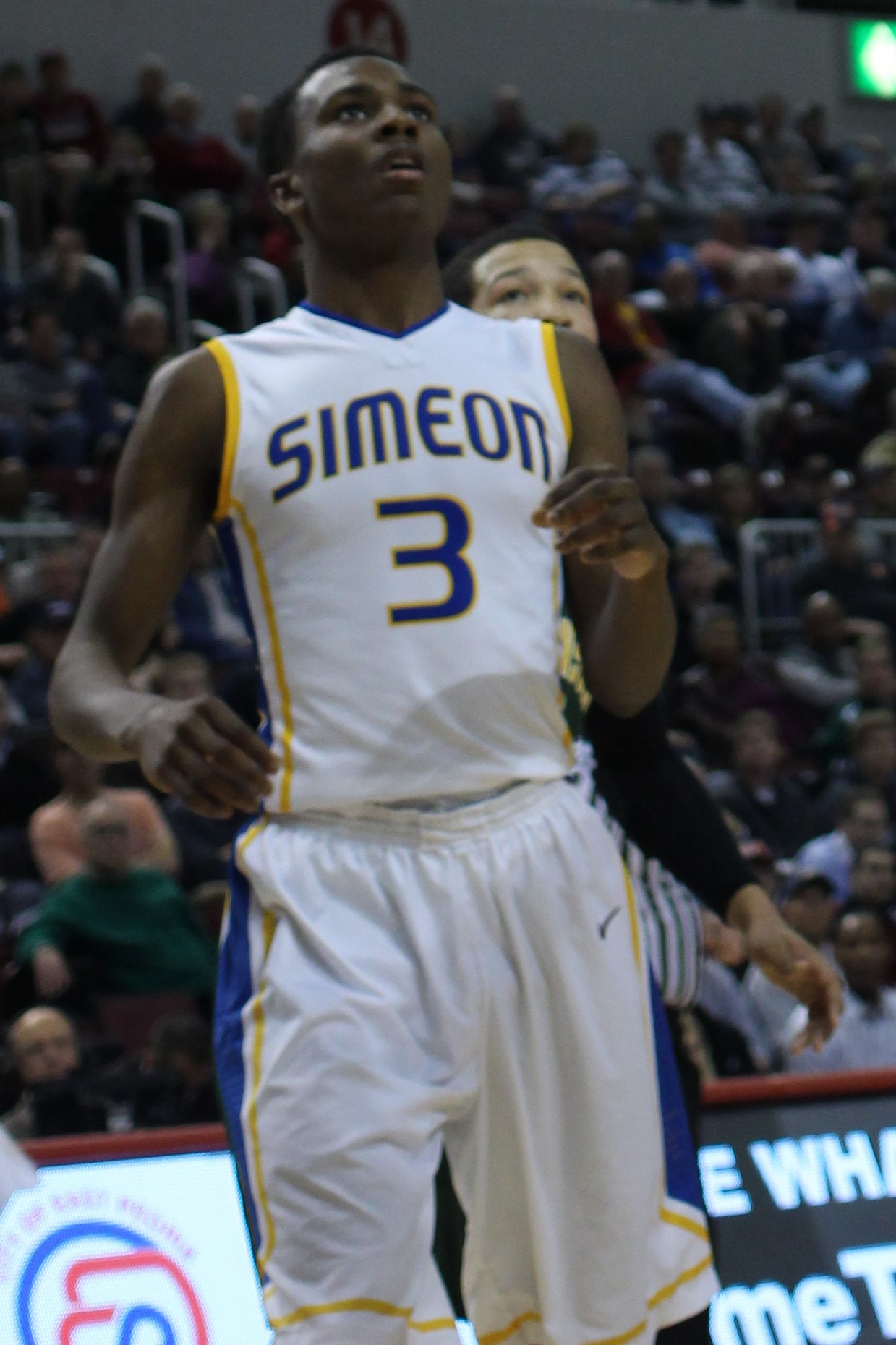
Ingram playing for Simeon in 2013

He attended Danville High School for two seasons. He competed in AAU for Mean Streets, and Jabari Parker, who played on a different AAU team, convinced him to transfer to Simeon Career Academy in Chicago. As a junior, Ingram was utilized as the sixth man on the Class 4A state championship team. Due to residency issues, Ingram was declared ineligible by the Illinois High School Association on January 15 but was reinstated on February 5. Milton Doyle, a native of Chicago, persuaded Ingram to come to Loyola (Illinois) after receiving a scholarship offer from Hampton University. One of the reasons Ingram picked the team is because his older brother DaJuan Gouard, who is now a community college coach, played for a Horizon League championship in 2002 with the Ramblers.

== College career ==
When Ingram arrived at Loyola, the team had had three straight losing seasons, but he liked coach Porter Moser and the "family" feel of the program. He was an important piece of the 2014–15 Loyola Ramblers team that won the 2015 College Basketball Invitational as a freshman, averaging 5 points and 3.1 rebounds per game. As a sophomore, he posted 7.4 points per game. His best game that year was a 19-point performance against Bradley on March 3, 2016.

I love Donte. He is a mismatch guy. He can switch defensively on (positions) one through four, he can guard a big inside, we trap the post with him, he can knock down a 3, put it on the deck and you can post him up. That gives us a lot of options offensively and defensively.

— Porter Moser, coach of Loyola Ramblers men's basketball

Ingram sprained his MCL in early December 2016 but recovered quickly. On December 17, he had 20 points and nine rebounds in an 81–75 win over UIC and hit the three-pointer to send the game to overtime. Ingram set career highs with 30 points and 10 rebounds in a 102–98 loss to Drake on December 29. He improved his scoring average to 13.6 points per game as a junior and added 6.6 rebounds per game. Ingram led the conference in three point shooting with 47.3 percent and was named to the Third Team All-Missouri Valley Conference.

As a senior, Ingram averaged 11.5 points and 6.3 rebounds per game. He was named to the Second team All-Missouri Valley Conference. Ingram was an important contributor to Loyola's 10–1 start, the best in 52 years, which included an upset of Florida. He contributed 18 points and eight rebounds in the final of the 2018 Missouri Valley tournament against Illinois State and was named most outstanding player. With the win, Loyola reached its first NCAA tournament since 1985. The Ramblers received an 11 seed, and in the Round of 64, Ingram hit a buzzer-beating 3-pointer on a pass from Marques Townes to defeat Miami 64–62 and finished with 13 points. He led Loyola on an improbable run to its first Final Four since 1963, scoring 12 points in the Elite Eight win against Kansas State. He received some media attention when a message from Chance the Rapper prompted him to open a Twitter account. After the season Ingram signed with Edge Sports International in preparation for the 2018 NBA draft.

=== College statistics ===
Year	Team	GP	GS	MPG	FG%	3P%	FT%	RPG	APG	SPG	BPG	PPG
2014–15	Loyola (Ill.)	37	1	18.3	.447	.373	.645	3.1	0.6	0.3	0.1	5.0
2015–16	Loyola (Ill.)	32	26	25.9	.394	.281	.843	4.1	0.8	0.4	0.3	7.4
2016–17	Loyola (Ill.)	28	29	32.6	.529	.458	.676	6.8	1.3	0.9	0.2	13.8
2017–18	Loyola (Ill.)	38	38	30.6	.443	.392	.680	6.4	1.6	0.9	0.4	11.0
Source: RealGM

== Professional career ==
Ingram worked out with several teams in preparation for the NBA draft and was praised for his size, versatility, shooting and defense. After going undrafted in the 2018 NBA draft, he joined the Chicago Bulls for the 2018 NBA Summer League. In five games, Ingram averaged 6.0 points, 4.8 rebounds, and 1.4 assists per game. He signed with the Dallas Mavericks on October 8, but was waived three days later. He subsequently joined the Mavericks' NBA G League affiliate, the Texas Legends, for the 2018–19 season. On the season, Ingram appeared in 43 games for the Legends, averaging 3.7 points and 2.2 rebounds per game.

Ingram joined the Greensboro Swarm for the 2019–20 NBA G League season. He averaged 4.8 points and 2.4 rebounds in 16.6 minutes per game.

On February 11, 2021, Ingram signed with the Nelson Giants of the New Zealand National Basketball League (NZNBL) for the 2021 season. He averaged 18.3 points, 6.5 rebounds, 2.4 assists, and 1.7 steals per game.

On June 12, 2021, Ingram signed with Dutch club Donar of the BNXT League for the 2021–22 season.

For the 2022–23 season, Ingram joined Romanian club Dinamo Bucharest.

For the 2023–24 season, Ingram joined Al Bataeh Club of the UAE National Basketball League. In January 2024, he joined Libyan club Al Ahli Tripoli. He then re-joined Al Bataeh for the 2024–25 season.

In November 2025, Ingram joined the Iowa Wolves for the 2025–26 NBA G League season.

On April 9, 2026, Ingram signed with the Wellington Saints for the 2026 New Zealand NBL season.

== Personal life ==
Ingram has said that he owns at least 50 pairs of sneakers. His teammate and friend, Saieed Ivey, was killed in June 2016; as a memorial, Ingram had custom Nike shoes made with the number 2 — Ivey's jersey number — on the top of the shoe and the acronym FINAO (failure is not an option), one of Ivey's favorite sayings, on the side.
