= Boy van Vliet =

Dutch basketball player

No. 3 – Landstede Hammers
- Position: Shooting guard
- League: BNXT League

Personal information
- Born: 13 July 1994 (age 32) 's-Hertogenbosch, Netherlands
- Listed height: 194 cm (6 ft 4 in)
- Listed weight: 82 kg (181 lb)

Career information
- College: North Iowa Area CC (2014–2016); Dallas Baptist (2016–2018)
- NBA draft: 2018: undrafted
- Playing career: 2018–present

Career history
- 2018–2019: Den Helder Suns
- 2019–2026: Heroes Den Bosch
- 2026–present: Landstede Hammers

Career highlights
- 2x Dutch Supercup champion (2025, 2026); 2× Dutch League champion (2022, 2025); 2× Dutch Cup winner (2024, 2025); DBL Rookie of the Year (2019)

Boy van Vliet (born 13 July 1994) is a Dutch basketball player for Landstede Hammers of the BNXT League. Standing at 194 cm (6 ft 4 1/2 in), Van Vliet plays as shooting guard. He is also a regular member of the Netherlands national basketball team.

== College career ==
Van Vliet played his first two seasons with North Iowa Area Community College (2014–2016). From 2016 to 2018, he played with the Dallas Baptist Patriots. Here, he played two seasons and averaged 14.8 points in the NCAA Division II.

=== College statistics ===
Year	Team	GP	GS	MPG	FG%	3P%	FT%	RPG	APG	SPG	BPG	PPG
2016–17	Dallas Baptist	34	18	22.8	.447	.350	.655	2.4	2.9	.8	.1	8.3
2017–18	Dallas Baptist	32	32	31.2	.486	.298	.780	4.7	4.6	1.2	.3	14.8

== Professional career ==
On 11 July 2018, Van Vliet signed a one-year contract with Den Helder Suns of the Dutch Basketball League (DBL). On 18 April 2019, he won the DBL Rookie of the Year award.

On 12 October 2019, Van Vliet signed a two-year contract with Heroes Den Bosch of his hometown 's-Hertogenbosch. He averaged 7.3 points and 1.6 assists in his first season with Heroes.

In his second season with Heroes, Van Vliet reached the Finals of the DBL for the first time, where the team lost to ZZ Leiden. He averaged 6.3 points and 3.0 assists per game. Van Vliet signed a two-year extension with the team on 9 July 2021.

On July 9, 2026, he signed with Landstede Hammers of the BNXT League.

== National team career ==
On 16 November 2018, Van Vliet was selected by head coach Toon van Helfteren to be a part of the Netherlands senior team for the first time.
