= Amanze Egekeze =

American basketball player

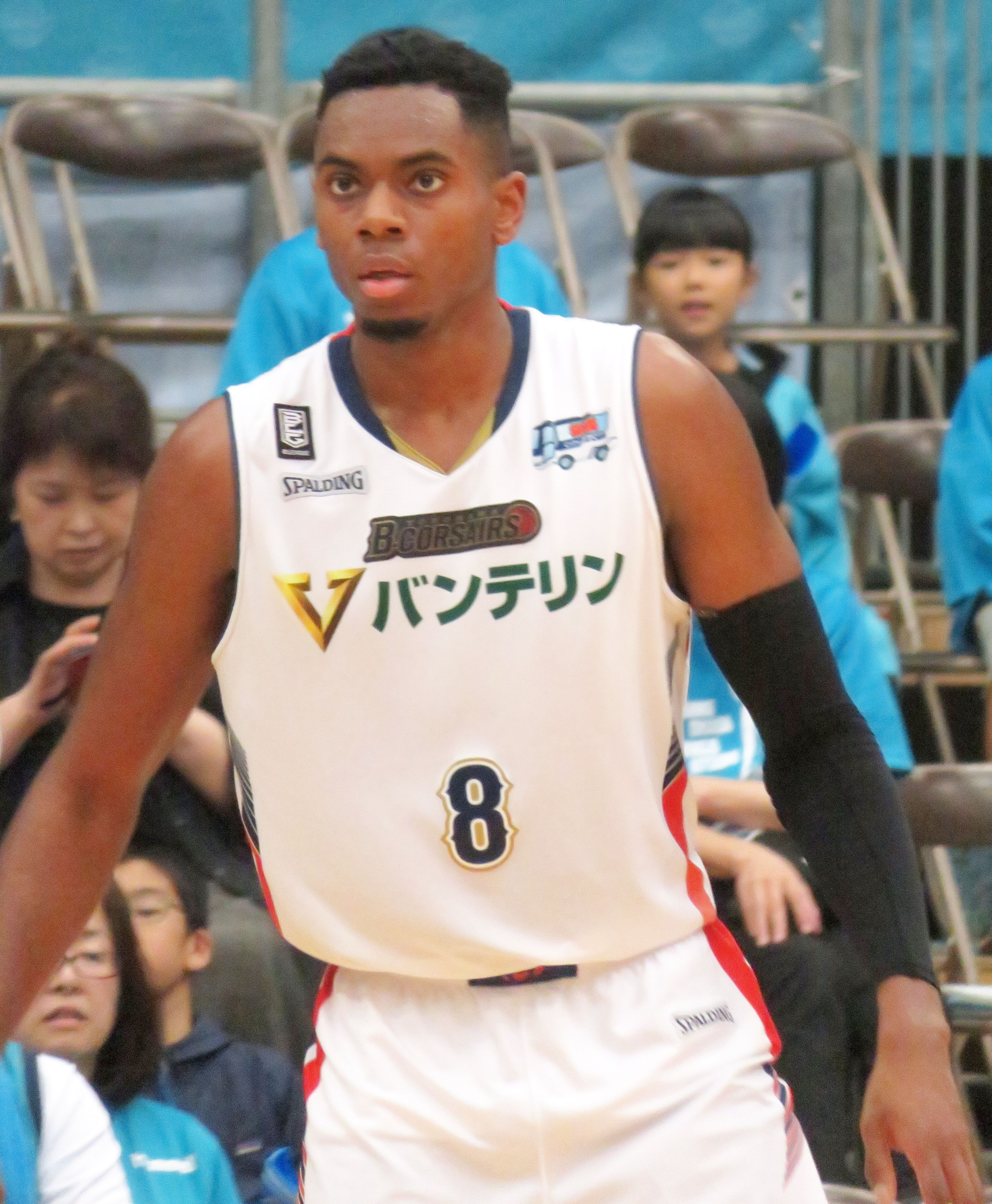
- Egekeze with Yokohama in 2018

No. 12 – Kataja
- Position: Power forward
- League: Korisliiga

Personal information
- Born: December 3, 1995 (age 30) Lake in the Hills, IL
- Listed height: 6 ft 8 in (2.03 m)
- Listed weight: 220 lb (100 kg)

Career information
- High school: Huntley (Huntley, Illinois)
- College: Belmont (2014–2018)
- NBA draft: 2018: undrafted
- Playing career: 2018–present

Career history
- 2018: Yokohama B-Corsairs
- 2019: Ryukyu Golden Kings
- 2019: Niigata Albirex BB
- 2019–2020: PAOK
- 2020–2021: BC Gries-Oberhoffen
- 2021–2022: Donar
- 2022–present: Kataja

Career highlights
- Dutch Cup winner (2022); Finnish Cup winner (2023); First-team All-OVC (2018)

Amanze Ikenna Egekeze (born December 3, 1995) is a Nigerian-American professional basketball player who plays for Kataja of the Korisliiga. He also played for the Nigerian national team. He is the son of Gilbert and Lize Egekeze, who are natives of Nigeria. His brothers are Uchenna and, Kemdi and has one sister Ogechi. Uchenna plays basketball at Calvin University.

== Early life and college career ==
Egekeze played for Huntley High School, where he was the 2014 Northwest Herald Boys Basketball Player of the Year. Egekeze played on three Class 4A regional champions.

Egekeze competed in college basketball for Belmont, where he scored 1,348 career points. As a senior, he was the second-leading scorer (16.8 per game) and rebounder (5.0 per game) for the Bruins. He was named to the First-team All-Ohio Valley Conference.

== Professional career ==
On July 13, 2018, Egekeze signed with the Yokohama B-Corsairs of the Japanese B.League. During the 2018–19 season, he also played for the Ryukyu Golden Kings and the Niigata Albirex BB from the same league.

On September 1, 2019, Egekeze signed with the Greek club PAOK. The 2019–20 season was complicated for PAOK. . Egekeze and PAOK also participated in the Champions League where they ended at the second to last position of the D group, composed of 8 teams, with 5 wins and 9 losses, thus, not qualifying for the next round.

In June 2020, Egekeze signed with the French club BC Gries-Oberhoffen. Egekeze and the BCGO participated in the Leaders Cup where they ended at the bottom of the D group, composed of 3 teams, with 1 win and 3 losses, thus, not qualifying for the next round.

On June 30, 2021, Egekeze signed with Dutch club Donar of the BNXT League. He helped Donar win the Dutch Cup.

On August 3, 2022, Egekeze signed a one-year contract with Kataja of the Korisliiga. In his first season with Kataja, He averaged 13.5 points, 6.5 rebounds, 1.9 assists and 1 steal. He also won the Finnish Cup and beat Salon Vilpas to win a bronze medal in Korisliiga

== National team career ==
In December 2020, Egekeze became a member of the Nigerian national basketball team, and played with the team in the qualifiers for AfroBasket 2021.

== Statistics ==
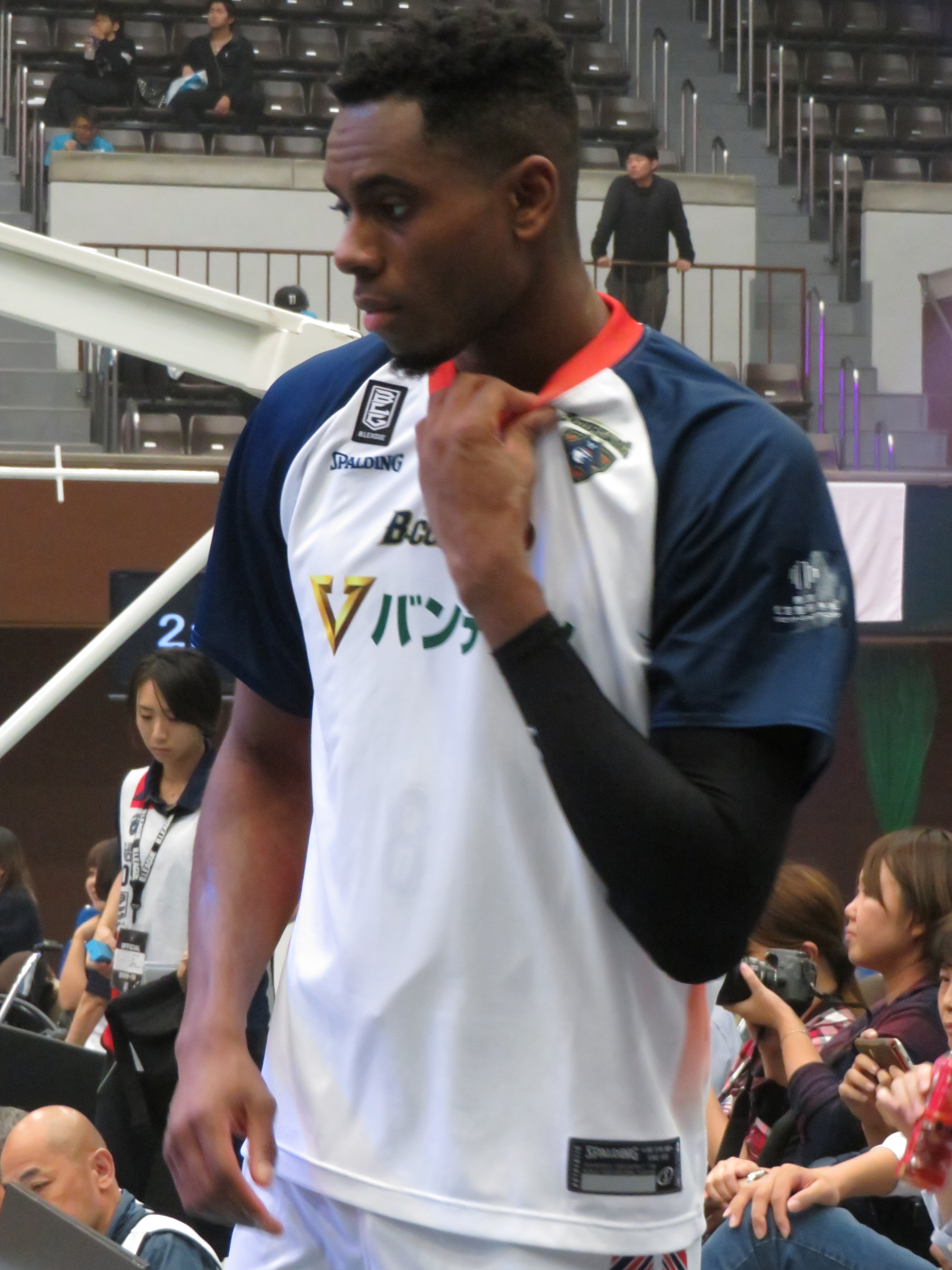
Egekeze as a member of the Yokohama B-Corsairs in 2018

Legend
GP	Games played	GS	Games started	MPG	Minutes per game
FG%	Field goal percentage	3P%	3-point field goal percentage	FT%	Free throw percentage
RPG	Rebounds per game	APG	Assists per game	SPG	Steals per game
BPG	Blocks per game	PPG	Points per game	**Bold**	Career high

=== College statistics ===
Year	Team	GP	GS	MPG	FG%	3P%	FT%	RPG	APG	SPG	BPG	PPG
2014–15	Belmont	33	23	20.0	.404	.338	.837	3.2	0.7	0.8	0.5	5.4
2015–16	Belmont	31	31	22.7	.539	.422	.768	3.4	0.7	0.4	0.4	9.0
2016–17	Belmont	30	29	27.2	.487	.384	.843	5.5	0.9	0.4	0.8	11.3
2017–18	Belmont	33	33	34.5	.505	.425	.802	6.2	0.9	0.6	0.2	16.8

=== Career statistics ===
Year	Team	GP	GS	MPG	FG%	3P%	FT%	RPG	APG	SPG	BPG	PPG
2018–19	Yokohama	15	15	33.6	.417	.280	.804	6.4	1.6	0.9	0.7	13.9
2018–19	Ryukyu	4	4	38.2	.429	.421	.714	7.2	1.8	1.0	0.2	12.2
2018–19	Niigata	2	2	31.5	.613	.467	.857	7.0	1.0	0.5	0.5	25.5
2019–20	PAOK	20	-	12.9	.635	.360	.727	2.1	0.5	0.1	0.1	3.8
2020–21	BCGO											
