= Einaras Tubutis =

Lithuanian basketball player

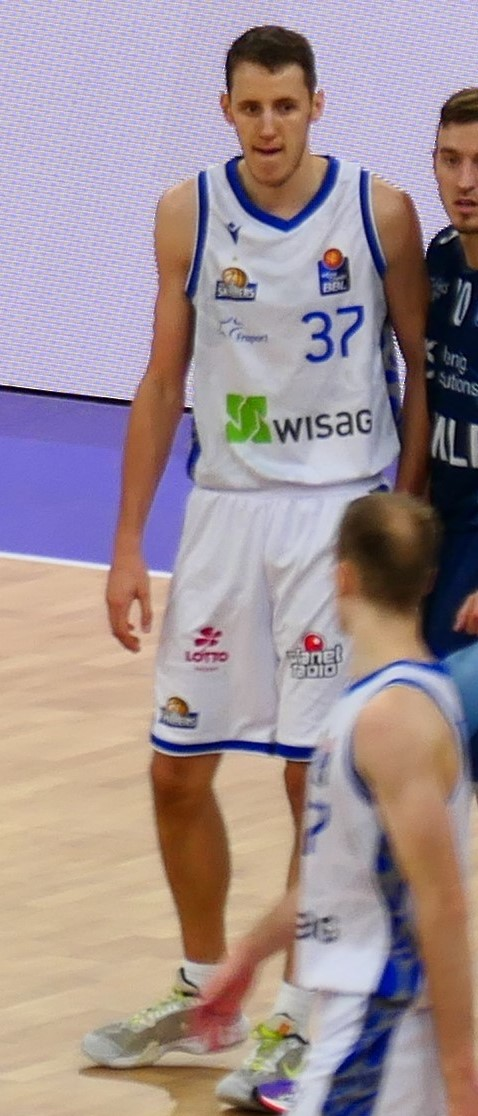
- Tubutis with Skyliners Frankfurt in October 2022

No. 37 – Neptūnas Klaipėda
- Position: Power forward
- League: LKL; EuroCup

Personal information
- Born: 4 November 1998 (age 28) Klaipėda, Lithuania
- Listed height: 2.07 m (6 ft 9 in)
- Listed weight: 95 kg (209 lb)

Career information
- NBA draft: 2020: undrafted
- Playing career: 2015–present

Career history
- 2015–2017: Vilnius Citus/VKC
- 2017–2020: Rytas Vilnius
- 2017–2020: →Perlas
- 2020–2021: CBet Prienai
- 2021–2022: ZZ Leiden
- 2022–2023: Skyliners Frankfurt
- 2023–2024: Élan Chalon
- 2024: M Basket Mažeikiai
- 2024–2025: Skyliners Frankfurt
- 2025–2026: Arka Gdynia
- 2026–present: Neptūnas Klaipėda

Career highlights
- BNXT League champion (2022); Dutch Supercup champion (2021)

Einaras Tubutis (born 4 November 1998) is a Lithuanian professional basketball player for Neptūnas Klaipėda of the Lithuanian Basketball League (LKL) and the EuroCup. Standing at 2.07 m (6 ft 9 1/2 in), he plays the power forward position. Tubutis has competed with the Lithuanian junior national teams on multiple occasions.

== Professional career ==
Tubutis made his professional career debut with Vilnius Citus/VKC team in RKL. After two season with Vilnius team, he signed with BC Perlas. Soon becoming one of the leaders, Tubutis was spotted by BC Rytas.

On 26 August 2021 he signed with ZZ Leiden of the Dutch Basketball League (DBL). Tubutis helped Leiden win the inaugural BNXT championship.

In July 2022, Tubutis signed with the German team Skyliners Frankfurt of the Basketball Bundesliga.

On 8 September 2023, he signed with Élan Chalon of the LNB Pro A.

On 1 February 2024, Tubutis signed with M Basket Mažeikiai of the Lithuanian Basketball League (LKL).

On 23 August 2024, Tubutis signed with Skyliners Frankfurt of the Basketball Bundesliga.

On August 21, 2025, he signed with Arka Gdynia of the Polish Basketball League (PLK).

On July 21, 2026, he signed with Neptūnas Klaipėda of the Lithuanian Basketball League (LKL) and the EuroCup.
