= Lotanna Nwogbo =

American-Nigerian basketball player

No. 24 – CD Estela
- Position: Center / power forward
- League: Primera FEB

Personal information
- Born: May 30, 1993 (age 33) Atlanta, Georgia
- Listed height: 6 ft 8 in (2.03 m)
- Listed weight: 255 lb (116 kg)

Career information
- High school: Mount Vernon Presbyterian School (Sandy Springs, Georgia)
- College: Tulane (2011–2013); Longwood (2014–2016)
- NBA draft: 2016: undrafted
- Playing career: 2016–present

Career history
- 2016–2017: Gimnasia Comodoro
- 2019–2020: Yeni Mamak Spor
- 2020–2021: Básquet Coruña
- 2021–2022: Donar
- 2022–2023: Básquet Coruña
- 2023–2024: Real Valladolid
- 2024: Guangxi Rhinos
- 2024–2025: Baloncesto Fuenlabrada
- 2025–2026: Estudiantes
- 2026–present: Estela

Career highlights
- Spain Cup winner (2026); Dutch Cup winner (2022); All-Big South First Team (2016)

Lotanna Afam Nwogbo (born May 30, 1993) is an American-Nigerian basketball player for Estela of the Primera FEB. Standing at 6 ft 8 in (2.03 m) tall, he plays as a center or power forward.

== Early life and high school career ==
Born in Atlanta, Nwogbo played for his high school Mount Vernon Presbyterian School. He was named first-team All-Georgia Independent School Association and All-Region after averaging 16 points and 9 rebounds in his senior season.

== College career ==
Nwogbo started his college career with Tulane. In 2013, he transferred to play for Longwood. In his senior season, he averaged 16.4 points and 8.8 rebounds. He was named to the All-Big South Conference First Team.

== Professional career ==
In 2016, Nwogbo started his professional career with Gimnasia Comodoro in the Argentinian Liga Nacional de Básquet (LNB). He averaged 11 points and 5.3 rebounds per game in 23 LNB games.

In the 2019–20 season, he returned to professional basketball when he signed in Turkey with Yeni Mamak Spor. On December 7, 2019, Nwogbo had a career-high 32 points in a 85–80 road loss to Akhisar.

On July 27, 2021, Nwogbo signed with Dutch club Donar of the BNXT League. He averaged 11.1 points and 5.3 rebounds in the BNXT competition, while missing the second half of the season due to an injury. He won the 2021–22 Dutch Basketball Cup with Donar.

On June 13, 2024, Nwogbo joined Guangxi Rhinos of National Basketball League. Nwogbo averaged 16.54 points, 8.46 rebounds, 1.75 assists in 26.31 minutes in 28 games.

On July 21, 2024, Nwogbo signed with Baloncesto Fuenlabrada of the Liga ACB.

== National team career ==
Nwogbo has played for the Nigeria national basketball team. In 2018, he played in three qualifying games for the 2019 FIBA Basketball World Cup.

== Personal ==
Lotanna is the son of Nneka and Chris Nwogbo and has two brothers, one being Zimmy who played college basketball for Cedarville University. He majored in kinesiology at Longwood University.
