= Willem Brandwijk =

Dutch basketball player

Free Agent
- Position: Small forward / power forward

Personal information
- Born: 31 July 1995 (age 31) Voorburg, Netherlands
- Listed height: 2.06 m (6 ft 9 in)
- Listed weight: 97 kg (214 lb)

Career information
- High school: Holderness School (Holderness, New Hampshire)
- College: Siena (2014–2017); IUP (2017–2019)
- NBA draft: 2019: undrafted
- Playing career: 2019–present

Career history
- 2019–2020: Feyenoord
- 2020–2023: Donar
- 2023–2024: Kangoeroes Mechelen
- 2024–2025: Spirou
- 2025: Aix Maurienne Savoie
- 2025–2026: Medi Bayreuth

Career highlights
- Dutch Cup winner (2022)

Willem Brandwijk (born 31 July 1995) is a Dutch professional basketball player who last played for Medi Bayreuth of the German ProA. He played college basketball for the IUP Cromson Hawks and Siena Saints. Standing at 2.06 m (6 ft 9 in), he has also been a member of the Netherlands national basketball team.

== Professional career ==
On 2 July 2019, Brandwijk signed with Feyenoord Basketbal of the Dutch Basketball League (DBL) for the 2019–20 season. There, he would play under Netherlands national team coach Toon van Helfteren.

On 7 July 2020, Brandwijk signed a 2-year contract with Donar. Brandwijk won his first silverware in the 2021–22 season, as he won the Dutch Cup with Donar. On 22 June 2022, he extended his contract with two more seasons until 2024.

In summer 2025, he signed with Aix-Maurienne in Elite 2, the second professional division in France and was released in December the same year.

== National team career ==
In August 2017, Brandwijk was first selected for the Netherlands national basketball team. In June 2018, he was selected by coach van Helfteren for the qualification games for the 2019 FIBA Basketball World Cup.
