= Jimmy Gavin =

American basketball player

No. 6 – Szolnoki Olajbányász
- Position: Point guard / shooting guard
- League: NB1/A

Personal information
- Born: August 28, 1991 (age 35) Arlington Heights, Illinois, U.S.
- Listed height: 6 ft 3 in (1.91 m)
- Listed weight: 195 lb (88 kg)

Career information
- High school: Prospect (Mt. Prospect, Illinois)
- College: Bradley (2012–2013); Wisconsin–Parkside (2013–2015); Winthrop (2015–2016)
- NBA draft: 2016: undrafted
- Playing career: 2016–present

Career history
- 2016–2017: Dzūkija
- 2017: Wilki Morskie Szczecin
- 2017–2018: Spartak Saint Petersburg
- 2018: Igokea
- 2018–2019: Burevestnik Jaroslav
- 2019–2020: Cherno More
- 2020: Iraklis Thessaloniki
- 2021: Akhisar Belediyespor
- 2021–2022: Donar
- 2022–present: Szolnoki Olajbányász

Career highlights
- Dutch Cup winner (2022); First-team All-Big South (2016); First-team All-GLVC (2015); Second-team All-GLVC (2014)

Jimmy Gavin (born August 28, 1991) is an American basketball player for Szolnoki Olajbányász of the Hungarian first division.

== Early career ==
Gavin played on his high school team in his freshman and sophomore year, but was unable to complete his sophomore year after he was diagnosed with Chrone's disease.

== College career ==
Gavin enrolled at Mississippi State University as a regular student focused on academics. In the spring of 2011, he left the university to return home after his younger brother was killed in a car crash.

The following year he joined the varsity team of Bradley, before transferring to the Wisconsin–Parkside Rangers in 2013. In two seasons, he scored 1,004 points in the NCAA Division II. As a senior he averaged 17.4 points and as named to the GLVC All-First Team.

In his final college season, he played in the Division I for Winthrop, averaging 18.7 points per game.

== Professional career ==
Gavin started his career with Dzūkija of the Lithuanian Basketball League (LKL). Prior, he was invited for the 2016 NBA Summer League to play for the Orlando Magic.

On November 12, 2021, Gavin signed with Donar of the BNXT League. On May 20, 2022, he won the Dutch Basketball Cup with Donar, contributing with a team-high of 15 points in the final.

== Awards and accomplishments ==
=== Club ===
Donar

- Dutch Cup: (2022)

=== Individual ===
- All-Big South First Team: (2016)
- Big South All-Tournament Team: (2016)
- GLVC All-First Team: (2015)
- GLVC All-Second Team: (2014)
- NABC All-District Midwest Second Team: (2015)
