= Austin Price =

American basketball player (born 1995)

No. 31 – Heroes Den Bosch
- Position: Point guard
- League: BNXT League

Personal information
- Born: September 16, 1995 (age 31) Indianapolis, Indiana, U.S.
- Listed height: 6 ft 4 in (1.93 m)
- Listed weight: 185 lb (84 kg)

Career information
- High school: Detroit Country Day (Beverly Hills, Michigan)
- College: Lehigh (2013–2017)
- NBA draft: 2017: undrafted
- Playing career: 2017–present

Career history
- 2017–2018: Köping Stars
- 2018–2019: Limburg United
- 2019–2020: Beroe
- 2020–2021: Maccabi Ra'anana
- 2021: Ironi Ness Ziona
- 2021–2024: Heroes Den Bosch
- 2024–2025: Argeș Pitești
- 2025–2026: Pelister
- 2026: Minyor Pernik
- 2026: Stjarnan
- 2026–present: Heroes Den Bosch

Career highlights
- Dutch League champion (2022); FIBA Europe Cup champion (2021)

Austin Price (born September 16, 1995) is an American professional basketball player for Heroes Den Bosch of the BNXT League. He played college basketball for the Lehigh Mountain Hawks.

== Early life ==
Price was born in Indianapolis, Indiana, moved to Detroit when he was a sophomore in high school, and his hometown is Farmington Hills, Michigan. He is 6-4, 185 pounds (193 cm, 83 kg).

He attended high school at Detroit Country Day (2013) in Michigan. Price played for the high school basketball team as a combo guard and team captain. As a junior, Price averaged 16 points, five assists, and two steals per game. As a senior he was team captain. Academically, he had a 3.65 GPA.

== College ==
Price attended Lehigh University (2017), majoring in Finance. He was a member of the Kappa Alpha Psi fraternity. He played basketball for the Lehigh Mountain Hawks basketball team in the Patriot League. As a freshman in 2013–14, he was named to the Patriot League All-Rookie Team, and to the Patriot League Academic Honor Roll. As a junior in 2015-16 he was second in the league with 55 steals and 1.7 steals per game, and was named third team All-Patriot League. As a senior in 2016-17 he was third in the league with 74 three-point field goals, and was again named third team All-Patriot League. He ended his Lehigh career second in school history with 240 three-pointers, and 13th in scoring with 1,453 points.

== Professional career ==
After college Price played for the Köping Stars in Sweden's second division, and was named Import Player of the Year (as the top player not from Sweden). In 2018–19 he played with Limburg United in the Pro Basketball League, the top league in Belgium.

In 2019–20 he played with BC Beroe in the Bulgarian National Basketball League, and averaged 15.6 points, 4.8 rebounds, and 2.8 assists per game. He started the 2020–21 season with Maccabi Ra'anana of the Israeli National League, and in 13 games averaged 17.7 points, 3.4 rebounds, and 3.1 assists per game.

From March 2021, Price played guard for Ironi Nes Ziona in the Israeli Premier Basketball League. He helped the team win the 2020–21 FIBA Europe Cup championship.

On July 20, 2021, Price signed a one-year contract with Heroes Den Bosch in the Netherlands. He won the Dutch national championship in the 2021–22 season. On July 4, 2022, he extended his contract with two more seasons.

In August 2026, he signed Stjarnan of the Úrvalsdeild karla in Iceland.

On October 31, 2026, he signed with Heroes Den Bosch of the BNXT League for a second stint.
