= Henry Caruso (basketball) =

American basketball player

USA Basketball
- Position: Shooting guard / small forward
- League: FIBA 3x3

Personal information
- Born: July 1, 1995 (age 31) Burlingame, California, U.S.
- Listed height: 6 ft 5 in (1.96 m)
- Listed weight: 200 lb (91 kg)

Career information
- High school: Junípero Serra (San Mateo, California)
- College: Princeton (2013–2017); Santa Clara (2017–2018)
- NBA draft: 2018: undrafted
- Playing career: 2018–present

Career history
- 2018: Auxilium Pallacanestro Torino
- 2019–2020: Heroes Den Bosch
- 2020–2022: Donar
- 2022–2023: Élan Chalon

Career highlights
- Dutch Cup winner (2022); All-Ivy League First Team (2016); NABC All-District First Team (2016); FIBA 3x3 AmeriCup MVP (2024)
Medals
Men's 3x3 basketball
Representing the United States
FIBA 3x3 AmeriCup
Gold medal – first place	2024 San Juan
Gold medal – first place	2025 León
Gold medal – first place	2026 San Salvador

Henry Caruso (born July 1, 1995) is an American basketball player who is a member of the United States men's national 3x3 team. He played college basketball at Princeton University and Santa Clara University.

== Early life ==
Henry Caruso was born on July 1, 1995, in Burlingame, California. He attended Junípero Serra High School in San Mateo, California, where he excelled in basketball. At Serra, Caruso earned all-state honors from MaxPreps, two-time team MVP, three-time all-league honoree, including first-team honors his final two seasons. He graduated as the second-leading scorer in school history with 1,453 points (school record, 1,490) and averaged 21 points and nine rebounds per game as a senior, scoring 627 points, after averaging 16 and eight as a junior and 12 and six as a sophomore. He also played football and baseball, was a three-time Scholar Athlete Award honoree and National Honor Society and California Scholarship Federation member. He graduated in 2013.

== College career ==
Caruso spent four seasons at Princeton. He was named to the First Team All-Ivy League as a junior. He averaged 15.0 points, 6.0 rebounds and shot 47 percent from 3-point range. Caruso injured his foot eight games into his senior season and missed the rest of the year. He transferred to Santa Clara as a graduate transfer, as his sister was attending the university. As a redshirt senior at Santa Clara, Caruso was team captain, averaged 12.2 points, 7.0 rebounds and 1.2 steals per game and achieved double-figure scoring in 24 games.

== Professional career ==
On August 22, 2018, Caruso signed with Auxilium Pallacanestro Torino.

On July 15, 2019, Caruso signed with Heroes Den Bosch in the Dutch Basketball League (DBL). He averaged 11.5 points, 5.0 rebounds, 1.3 assists and shot 48 percent from 3-point range before the DBL stopped due to coronavirus.

On August 23, 2020, Caruso signed with Donar of the DBL and the Basketball Champions League.

On July 22, 2022, he signed a one-year deal with French club Élan Chalon of the LNB Pro A.

== Personal life ==
Caruso is the grandson of Ann Russell Miller. He holds an Italian passport.
