= Austin Luke =

American basketball player

No. 1 – Dziki Warsaw
- Position: Point guard
- League: PLK; Europe Cup

Personal information
- Born: October 27, 1994 (age 32)
- Listed height: 6 ft 4 in (1.93 m)
- Listed weight: 200 lb (91 kg)

Career information
- High school: Rowlett (Rowlett, Texas)
- College: Belmont (2014–2018)
- NBA draft: 2018: undrafted
- Playing career: 2018–present

Career history
- 2018: VEF Rīga
- 2018–2019: Kirchheim Knights
- 2019–2020: Melilla
- 2020–2021: Yoast United
- 2021–2022: Donar
- 2022–2023: Helios Suns
- 2023: Heroes Den Bosch
- 2023: FMP
- 2024: Cedevita Junior
- 2024: Sutjeska
- 2025: Bosna
- 2025–2026: Donar
- 2026–present: Dziki Warsaw

Career highlights
- ABA League second division winner (2025); 2x Dutch Cup winner (2022, 2026); DBL assists leader (2021); 2× First-team All-OVC (2017, 2018)

Austin Luke (born October 27, 1994) is an American basketball player for Dziki Warsaw of the Polish Basketball League (PLK) and the Europe Cup. He primarily plays as point guard.

== College career ==
Luke played four years of college basketball for Belmont. He was named to the All-OVC First Team twice, in 2017 and 2018. As a senior, Luke averaged 9.2 points, 7.5 assists, and 2.9 rebounds per game.

== Professional career ==
In July 2018, Luke started his professional career in Latvia, signing with VEF Rīga. He was released after 6 games. He later signed with VfL Kirchheim Knights in the German ProA.

In the 2019–20 season, Luke played for Club Melilla Baloncesto in the Spanish LEB Oro.

On August 17, 2020, Luke signed with Basketball Community Gelderland of the Dutch Basketball League (DBL). The team later changed its name to Yoast United. Luke averaged 16.2 points and a league-high 9.6 assists over the regular season.

On April 30, 2021, Luke sent Yoast United to the final of the 2021 DBL Cup after an impressive performance against Landstede Hammers. In the semi-final, he recorded 52 points, 8 rebounds and 8 assists, including 10 three-point field goals. As a result, the seventh-ranked team Yoast reached the cup final in its debut season.

On June 4, 2021, Luke signed a one-year contract with Donar in the DBL. On May 20, 2022, he won the Dutch Basketball Cup with Donar, leading the team with team-highs of 15 points and 8 assists in the final. On June 8, Luke scored a team-high 31 points in a decisive 101–100 semifinal win over Heroes Den Bosch to bring Donar to its first ever BNXT finals.

On December 28, 2024, Luke signed a contract with Bosna Visit Sarajevo in the Bosnian League. With Bosna he won the ABA League second division, earning them a promotion back to the ABA League.

He himself however, signed a contract with Donar again for the 2025-26 season. There, he won his second Dutch Cup.

On August 4 2026, Luke signed with Dziki Warsaw of the Polish Basketball League (PLK), the fresh winners of the ENBL.
