= MartiniPlaza =

Indoor arena in Groningen, Netherlands

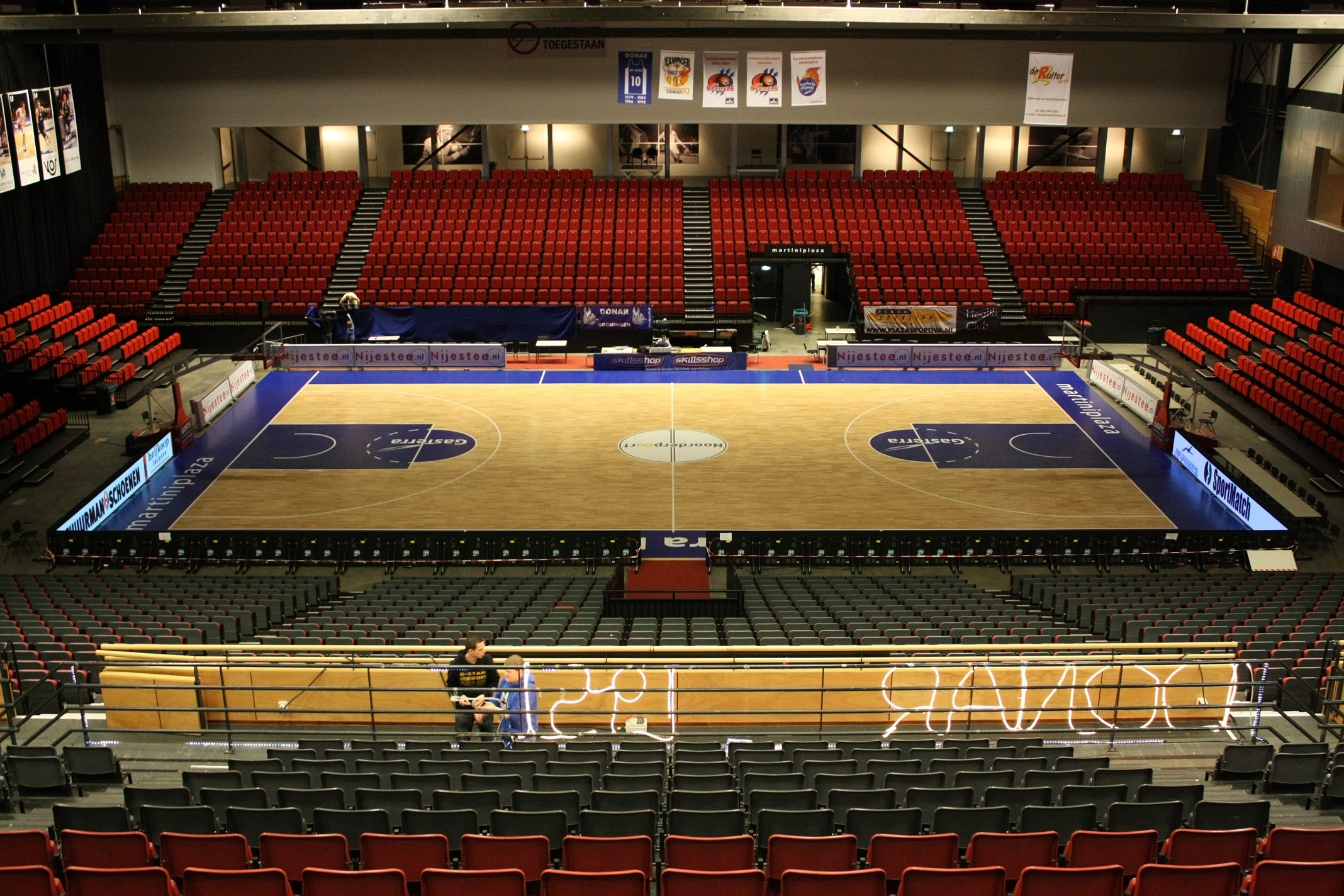
- The main hall set up as basketball court in 2011
- Interactive map of MartiniPlaza
- Full name: MartiniPlaza
- Former names: Martinihal Groningen (1969–2000)
- Location: Groningen, Netherlands
- Coordinates: 53°12′10″N 6°33′23″E
- Capacity: 4,500

Construction
- Built: 1969
- Expanded: 2000

Tenants
- Donar (2000–present); Lycurgus (occasionally)

Website
- www.martiniplaza.nl/nl/

MartiniPlaza (formerly Martinihal Groningen) is an indoor arena located in Groningen, Netherlands. It is used as an exhibition complex, theater and sports arena. The arena is the home of the basketball team Donar and has a capacity of 4,350 people.

== Concerts ==
Date	Artist	Tour
19 August 1972	Wings	Wings Over Europe Tour
10 April 1975	Genesis	The Lamb Lies Down on Broadway Tour
January 31, 1979	The Jacksons	Destiny World Tour
18 March 1995	Bob Dylan	Never Ending Tour 1995
10 December 1996	Backstreet Boys	Backstreet Boys: Live in Concert Tour
25 November 2018	Within Temptation	The Resist Tour

== Sport events ==
Date	Event	Sport
27–31 December 2012	Groninger Basketball Week	Basketball
13–15 September 2013	2013 Davis Cup World Group play-offs	Tennis
26 March 2017	2016–17 NBB Cup Final	Basketball
25 March 2018	2017–18 NBB Cup Final	Basketball
19–29 January 2022	UEFA Futsal Euro 2022 Group Stage	Futsal
13 March 2022	2021–22 NBB Cup Final	Basketball

== Gallery ==
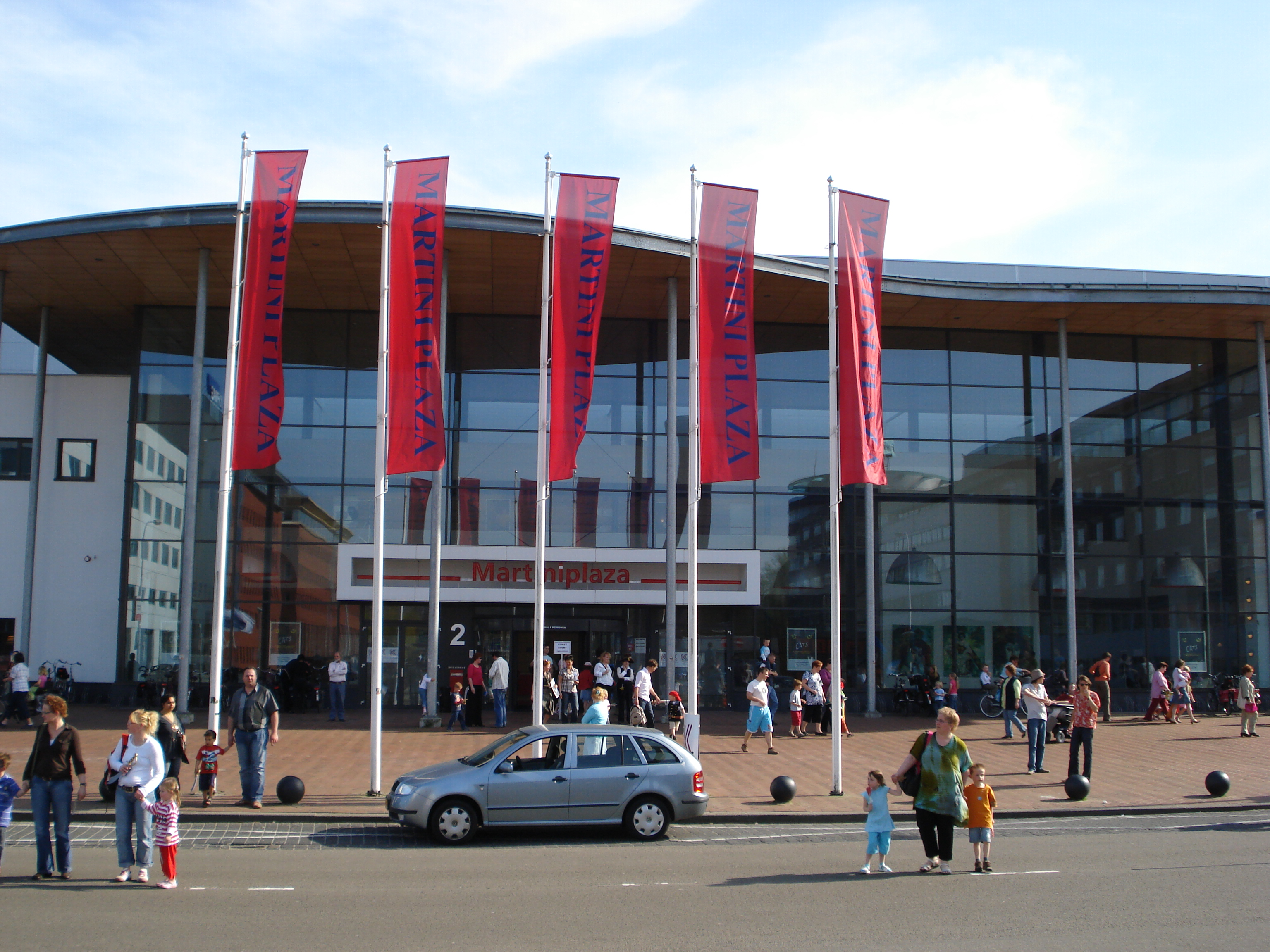
Outside view

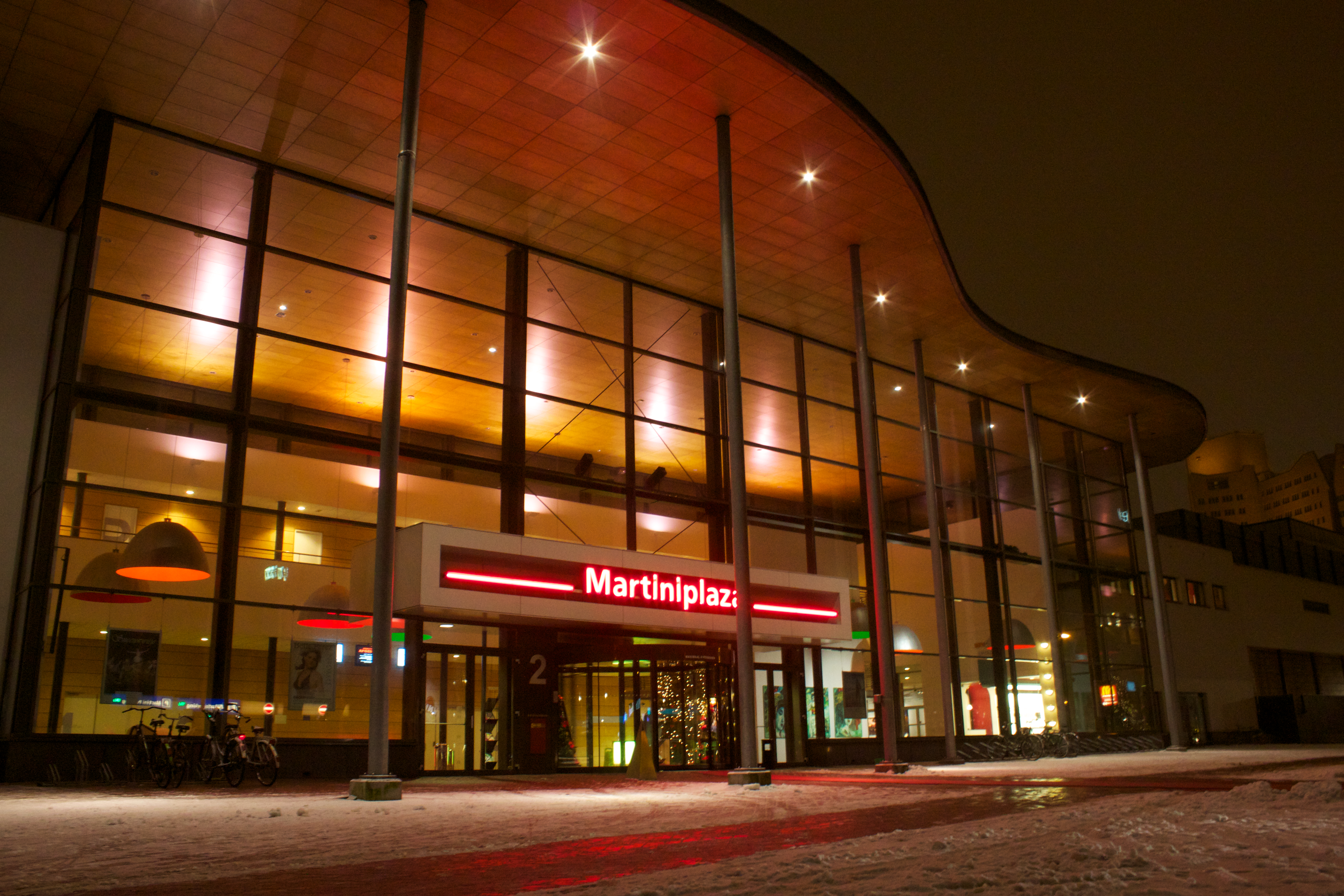
Entrance

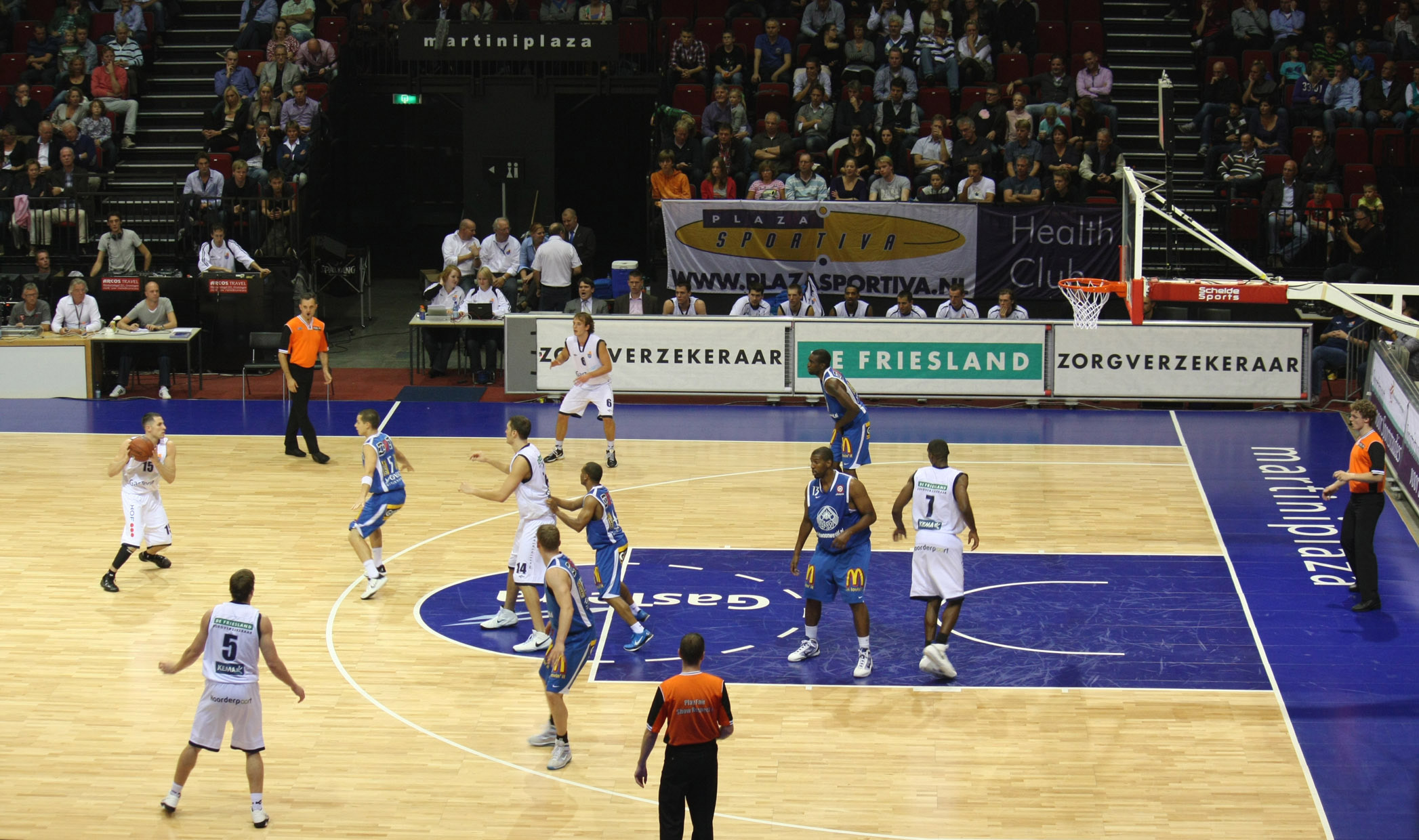
During a basketball game
