= Donte Thomas =

American basketball player (born 1996)

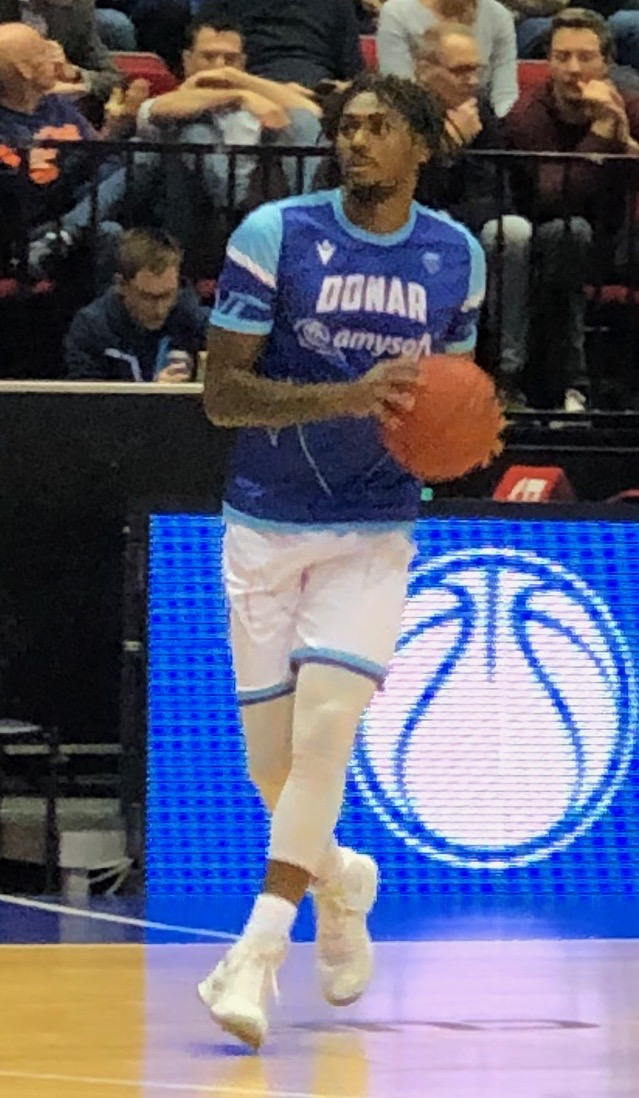
- Thomas with Donar in November 2019

Free Agent
- Position: Power forward

Personal information
- Born: May 6, 1996 (age 30) Olympia Fields, Illinois
- Listed height: 2.01 m (6 ft 7 in)
- Listed weight: 104 kg (229 lb)

Career information
- High school: Thornwood (South Holland, Illinois)
- College: Bradley (2014–2018)
- NBA draft: 2018: undrafted
- Playing career: 2018–present

Career history
- 2018–2019: KTP
- 2019–2020: Donar
- 2020–2021: Cantù
- 2021–2022: Donar
- 2022–2024: Heroes Den Bosch

Career highlights
- Dutch Cup winner (2022); Second-team All-MVC (2018); MVC All-Improved Team (2017); 2× MVC Scholar-Athlete Second Team (2017, 2018)

Donte Thomas (born May 6, 1996) is an American basketball player who last played for the Heroes Den Bosch of the BNXT League. He played college basketball for the Bradley Braves before turning professional in 2018. Standing at 6 ft 7 in (2.01 m), Thomas plays as power forward.

== High school career ==
Born in Olympia Fields, Illinois, Thomas attended Thornwood High School. He averaged 17 points, 8 rebounds and 3 assists in his junior season in 2012–13 and earned first-team all-area honours.

== College career ==
Thomas committed to play for the Bradley Braves. In the 2017–18 season, he was named to the Second-Team All-Missouri Valley Conference.

== Professional career ==
=== KTP ===
On August 5, 2018, Thomas signed a one-year contract with KTP-Basket of the Finnish Korisliiga. With KTP, Thomas averaged 15.5 points and 8.4 rebounds in 46 Korisliiga games with the team.

At the end of his rookie year, Donte Thomas was invited by the Oklahoma City Thunder to participate in an NBA free agent mini-camp in June, 2019

=== Donar ===
On July 6, 2019, Thomas signed a one-year contract with Basketball Champions League and FIBA Europe Cup participant Donar of the Dutch Basketball League (DBL). The 2019–20 DBL season was cancelled prematurely due to the COVID-19 pandemic. In 18 games with Donar, Thomas averaged 15.7 points and 7.4 rebounds per game in 27.6 minutes.

=== Cantù ===
On June 22, 2020, Thomas signed with Pallacanestro Cantù of the Italian Lega Basket Serie A (LBA). He averaged 7.0 points and 4.4 rebounds per game.

=== Return to Donar ===
On July 22, 2021, Thomas signed with Alba Fehérvár of the Nemzeti Bajnokság I/A (NB I/A). He did not play a game for the club. On November 14, 2021, Thomas returned to Donar after he signed a contract for the remainder of the 2021–22 season. He won the 2021–22 Dutch Basketball Cup with Donar.

=== Heroes Den Bosch ===
On July 28, 2022, he signed a one-year contract with Heroes Den Bosch.

== Personal ==
Donte is the son of Dontay Thomas and Latoya McCowan and has one sibling. He majored in social work at Bradley.
