= 2021–22 Dutch Basketball Cup =

Dutch Basketball Cup
- Season: 2021–22

Finals
- Champions: Donar (7th title)
- Runners-up: Heroes Den Bosch

The 2021–22 Dutch Basketball Cup was the 54th edition of the Netherlands' national basketball cup tournament. The final was played on 20 March 2022 in the MartiniPlaza, Groningen. Donar defeated Heroes Den Bosch to win its tied-record 7th cup title.

== Bracket ==
Eight-finals
CobraNova	57
Donar	102
BAL	53
Landstede Hammers	67
Aris Leeuwarden	95
Apollo Amsterdam	85
Feyenoord	82
Apollo Amsterdam	65
Lokomotief Rijswijk	81
The Hague Royals	92
BV Hoofddorp	44
ZZ Leiden	95
BS Leiden	54
Heroes Den Bosch	113
BV Noordkop	52
Den Helder Suns	94

Quarter-finals
Donar (OT)	85	71	156
Landstede Hammers	73	79	152
Aris Leeuwarden	76	89	165
Feyenoord	82	67	149
The Hague Royals	62	56	118
ZZ Leiden	80	89	169
Heroes Den Bosch	80	88	168
Den Helder Suns	63	47	110

Semi-finals
Donar	91	80	171
Aris Leeuwarden	58	70	128
ZZ Leiden	83	72	155
Heroes Den Bosch	80	77	157

Final
13 March – Groningen
Donar	76
Heroes Den Bosch	71

== Eightfinals ==
The draw for the eightfinals was held on 26 November 2021. The eightfinals began on 11 December 2021 and ended on 18 December 2021.

11 December 2021

Report

CobraNova (2)	57–102	Donar (1)

Forum Kwadraat, Voorburg

11 December 2021

Report

BAL (1)	53–67	Landstede Hammers (1)

Sporthal Boshoven, Weert

11 December 2021

Report

BV Hoofddorp (2)	44–95	ZZ Leiden (1)

Sportcomplex Koning Willem-Alexander, Hoofddorp

11 December 2021

Report

Feyenoord (1)	82–65	Yoast United (1)

Topsportcentrum, Rotterdam

12 December 2021

Report

Aris Leeuwarden (1)	95–85	Apollo Amsterdam (1)

Kalverdijkje, Leeuwarden

15 December 2021

BV Noordkop (2)	vs.	Den Helder Suns (1)

Sporthal Sportlaan, Den Helder

16 December 2021

Report

Lokomotief Rijswijk (2)	81–92	The Hague Royals (1)

De Altis, Rijswijk

18 December 2021

Report

BS Leiden (2)	54–113	Heroes Den Bosch (1)

Sporthal Houtkwartier, Leiden

== Final ==
20 March 2022	Donar	76–71	Heroes Den Bosch	Groningen
15:00	Scoring by quarter: 25–25, 16–15, 23–23, 12–8
NPO 1	Pts: Austin Luke, Jimmy Gavin 15; Rebs: Henry Caruso 9 Asts: Austin Luke 8	Boxscore	Pts: Austin Price 21; Rebs: Mike Carlson 7 Asts: Edon Maxhuni 5	Arena: MartiniPlaza; Attendance: 4,100; Referees: Tijmen Last, Mo Shouman, Stan Kestein

== See also ==
- 2021–22 BNXT League
