= 2021–22 BNXT League =

1st season of the BNXT League

- League: BNXT League
- Sport: Basketball
- Duration: 24 September 2021 – 11 June 2022
- Teams: 21
- TV partner(s): Sporza; NPO 1 Ziggo Sport

Regular season
- Top seed: Oostende
- Season MVP: Levi Randolph (Oostende)
- Top scorer: Emmanuel Nzekwesi (Mons-Hainaut)

National playoffs
- Belgian champions: Oostende (23rd title)
- Belgian runners-up: Kangoeroes Mechelen
- Dutch champions: Heroes Den Bosch (17th title)
- Dutch runners-up: ZZ Leiden

Finals
- Champions: ZZ Leiden (1st title)
- Runners-up: Donar
- Finals MVP: Worthy de Jong (ZZ Leiden)

BNXT seasons
- 2022–23 →

The 2021–22 BNXT League was the inaugural season of the BNXT League, the highest professional basketball league in Belgium and the Netherlands. It replaced the Dutch Basketball League and the Pro Basketball League.

The season started with the BNXT Supercup on 19 September, while the regular season began on 24 September 2021. The season ended on 11 June 2022 with the final game of the Finals.

ZZ Leiden won the inaugural BNXT championship. Heroes Den Bosch won the Dutch national championship while Filou Oostende won the Belgian national championship.

== Creation ==
On 10 December 2020, it was announced that the Belgian Pro Basketball League and Dutch Basketball League would merge to form a new multinational league. All clubs from the Dutch DBL voted for, while 9 of 10 teams in Belgium voted in favor of the decision. Serious talks about the initiative had been ongoing since fall 2019. On 20 May 2021, the new name "BNXT League" and logo of the league were revealed.

== Competition formula ==
The league will consist of different stages with national championships and a common BeNeLeague championship.

	Teams entering in this round
National regular season (21 teams) 24.09.2021.–20.02.2022.	10 Belgian teams; 11 Dutch teams; All teams play each other home and away
Elite Gold (10 teams) 27.02.2022–29.04.2022.	Best 5 Dutch teams; Best 5 Belgian teams; Teams play 10 games
Elite Silver (11 teams) 27.02.2022.–29.04.2022.	Bottom-6 Dutch teams; Bottom-5 Belgian teams; Teams play 10 games
National play-offs (6 teams) 03.05.2022.–29.05.2022.	Top two Gold teams from each country go directly to semifinals; Three other Gold teams play in quarter-finals; Best Silver team joins the quarter-finals
BNXT League play-offs (20 teams) 04.05.2022.–11.06.2022.	Bottom Elite Silver removed from competition; Elite Silver playoff (8 teams); BNXT playoffs R1: 4 Winners Elite Silver Playoff vs. 4 national PO . quarter-finalists dropping out; BNXT playoffs R2: Winners BNXT PO1 vs. losing semi-finalists national PO; BNXT playoffs R3: BNXT PO2 winners compete against each other; BNXT Quarter-finals: Winners BNXT PO3 vs. losing finalists national PO; BNXT Semi-finals: Winners BNXT PO4 vs. champions national PO; BNXT Finals: Winners BNXT PO5 will compete for the title of BNXT League Champion.

== Teams ==
All 22 teams from the 2020–21 Dutch Basketball League and 2020–21 Pro Basketball League were awarded licenses to play. Almere Sailors withdrew in August due to the lack of financial resources.

=== Arenas and locations ===
Location of teams in the BNXT League

Note: Table lists in alphabetical order.

Club	Location	Venue	Capacity
Netherlands
Apollo Amsterdam	Amsterdam	Apollohal	1,500
Aris Leeuwarden	Leeuwarden	Kalverdijkje	1,700
BAL	Weert	Sporthal Boshoven	1,000
Den Helder Suns	Den Helder	Sporthal Sportlaan	1,000
Donar	Groningen	MartiniPlaza	4,350
Feyenoord	Rotterdam	Topsportcentrum Rotterdam	2,500
Heroes Den Bosch	's-Hertogenbosch	Maaspoort	2,800
Landstede Hammers	Zwolle	Landstede Sportcentrum	1,200
The Hague Royals	The Hague	Sportcampus Zuiderpark	3,500
Yoast United	Bemmel	De Kooi	650
ZZ Leiden	Leiden	Vijf Meihal	2,000
Belgium
Antwerp Giants	Antwerp	Lotto Arena	5,218
Kangoeroes Mechelen	Mechelen	Winketkaai	1,500
Leuven Bears	Leuven	Sportoase	3,400
Liège Basket	Liège	Country Hall	5,000
Limburg United	Hasselt	Alverberg Sporthal	1,730
Mons-Hainaut	Mons	Mons Arena	4,000
Okapi Aalst	Aalst	Okapi Forum	2,800
Oostende	Ostend	COREtec Dôme	5,000
Phoenix Brussels	Brussels	Piscine de Neder-Over-Hembeek	1,200
Spirou	Charleroi	Spiroudome	6,200

=== Personnel and sponsorship ===
Team	Manager	Captain	Kit manufacturer	Main sponsor
Antwerp Giants	(Belgium) Luc Smout	(Belgium) Jean-Marc Mwema	Spalding	Telenet
Apollo Amsterdam	(Netherlands) Wierd Goedee	(Suriname) Sergio De Randamie	Nike	Behind The Arc
Aris Leeuwarden	(Netherlands) Vincent van Sliedregt	(Netherlands) Tim Hoeve	Craft	Vriezon
BAL	(Serbia) Radenko Varagić	(Netherlands) Roel van Overbeek	Spalding	Enerparking
Den Helder Suns	(Netherlands) Peter van Noord	(Netherlands) Nino Gorissen	Spalding	TekPark
Donar	(United States) Matthew Otten	(Netherlands) Thomas Koenis	Macron	FlexVirtual
Feyenoord	(Netherlands) Toon van Helfteren	(Netherlands) Jeroen van der List	Adidas	Zeeuw & Zeeuw
Heroes Den Bosch	(Netherlands) Erik Braal	(Netherlands) Boy van Vliet	Macron	Inamood
Kangoeroes Mechelen	(Belgium) Kristof Michiels	(Belgium) Wen Mukubu	Spalding	Bengal
Landstede Hammers	(Netherlands) Herman van den Belt	(United Kingdom) Nigel van Oostrum	Acerbis	Landstede
Leuven Bears	(Belgium) Eddy Casteels	(United States) Joshua Heath	Spalding	Stella Artois
Liège Basket	(Belgium) Lionel Bosco	(Belgium) François Lhoest	Ohka	Solidbeton
Limburg United	(Belgium) Raymond Westphalen	(United States) Clifford Hammonds	K1x	Hubo Belgium
Mons-Hainaut	(Bosnia and Herzegovina) Vedran Bosnić	(United States) Justin Cage	Olympic	Belfius
Okapi Aalst	(Belgium) Yves Defraigne	(Belgium) Senne Geukens	Spalding	CheckNet
Oostende	(Croatia) Dario Gjergja	(Serbia) Dušan Đorđević	Spalding	Filou
Phoenix Brussels	(Belgium) Jean-Marc Jaumin	(Belgium) Terry Deroover	Macron	None
Spirou	(Belgium) Sam Rotsaert	(Belgium) Alex Libert	Spalding	RTL
The Hague Royals	(Netherlands) Bert Samson	(Lithuania) Deividas Kumelis	Burned	None
Yoast United	(Belgium) Paul Vervaeck	(United States) Nate Britt	Jako	Yoast SEO
ZZ Leiden	(Netherlands) Geert Hammink	(Netherlands) Marijn Ververs	Peak	Zorg en Zekerheid

=== Coaching changes ===
Team	Outgoing coach	Manner of departure	Date of vacancy	Position in table	Incoming coach	Date of appointment
Kangoeroes Mechelen	(Belgium) Paul Vervaeck	End of contract	27 February 2021	Pre-season	(Belgium) Kristof Michiels	13 April 2021
Donar	(United States) Pete Miller	End of interim contract	25 May 2021	Pre-season	(United States) Matthew Otten	25 May 2021
Yoast United	(United States) Matthew Otten	Signed with Donar	25 May 2021	Pre-season	(Belgium) Paul Vervaeck	13 June 2021
Heroes Den Bosch	(Belgium) Jean-Marc Jaumin	End of contract	3 June 2021	Pre-season	(Netherlands) Erik Braal	15 June 2021
Aris Leeuwarden	(Belgium) Ferried Naciri	End of contract	3 June 2021	Pre-season	(Netherlands) Vincent van Sliedregt	8 June 2021
Apollo Amsterdam	(Netherlands) Edwin van der Hart	End of contract	4 June 2021	Pre-season	(Netherlands) Wierd Goedee	25 June 2021
Limburg United	(Belgium) Sacha Massot	Fired	30 September 2021	10th (0–3)	(Belgium) Raymond Westphalen	30 September 2021
Phoenix Brussels	(Belgium) Ian Hanavan	Fired	18 October 2021	10th (1–3)	(Belgium) Jean-Marc Jaumin	19 October 2021
Antwerp Giants	(Belgium) Christophe Beghin	Mutual Agreement	14 January 2022	2nd (10–5)	(Belgium) Luc Smout	14 January 2022

== National Round ==
=== Netherlands ===
==== Standings ====
Pos	Team	Pld	W	L	PF	PA	PD	Pts	Qualification
1	Heroes Den Bosch	20	18	2	1764	1399	+365	38	Advance to Elite Gold
2	ZZ Leiden	20	17	3	1749	1331	+418	37	Advance to Elite Gold
3	Donar	20	14	6	1510	1271	+239	34	Advance to Elite Gold
4	Landstede Hammers	20	14	6	1612	1433	+179	34	Advance to Elite Gold
5	Feyenoord	20	10	10	1549	1564	−15	30	Advance to Elite Gold
6	Aris Leeuwarden	20	9	11	1586	1630	−44	29	Advance to Elite Silver
7	Yoast United	20	8	12	1622	1681	−59	28	Advance to Elite Silver
8	Apollo Amsterdam	20	7	13	1346	1574	−228	27	Advance to Elite Silver
9	Den Helder Suns	20	6	14	1501	1698	−197	26	Advance to Elite Silver
10	BAL	20	6	14	1356	1556	−200	26	Advance to Elite Silver
11	The Hague Royals	20	1	19	1275	1733	−458	21	Advance to Elite Silver

Source: BNXT League

==== Results ====
Home \ Away	AMS	ARI	BAL	DON	DHE	FEY	HDB	LAN	THR	YOA	ZZL
Apollo Amsterdam	—	72–77	73–68	0–20	87–76	71–81	57–103	71–63	47–46	79–69	58–88
Aris Leeuwarden	95–75	—	83–74	81–80	86–78	76–81	83–90	73–94	91–75	87–69	70–94
BAL	94–68	76–69	—	0–20	64–61	49–74	77–87	73–101	66–61	87–81	59–85
Donar	96–60	81–69	83–40	—	93–52	84–75	62–68	67–69	85–58	84–85	63–92
Den Helder Suns	80–75	77–103	98–97	78–88	—	83–80	75–94	77–74	73–87	79–65	63–82
Feyenoord	71–77	69–66	81–62	79–93	82–78	—	82–72	76–80	103–69	79–69	50–83
Heroes Den Bosch	90–63	93–78	97–56	100–87	90–61	113–70	—	87–70	102–70	90–85	72–64
Landstede Hammers	83–68	82–75	83–73	63–75	99–98	74–61	49–65	—	95–58	88–71	68–75
The Hague Royals	70–103	62–73	64–81	52–91	79–89	78–88	54–97	45–101	—	71–93	27–88
Yoast United	103–79	94–83	93–92	81–87	84–57	86–84	71–84	72–96	87–83	—	82–88
ZZ Leiden	101–63	114–68	94–68	69–71	89–68	101–83	85–70	73–80	80–66	104–82	—

Source: BNXT League
Legend: Blue = home team win; Red = away team win.

=== Belgium ===
==== Standings ====
Pos	Team	Pld	W	L	PF	PA	PD	Pts	Qualification
1	Oostende	18	18	0	1625	1325	+300	36	Advance to Elite Gold
2	Kangoeroes Mechelen	18	13	5	1529	1432	+97	31	Advance to Elite Gold
3	Mons-Hainaut	18	12	6	1406	1383	+23	30	Advance to Elite Gold
4	Antwerp Giants	18	11	7	1527	1429	+98	29	Advance to Elite Gold
5	Leuven Bears	18	10	8	1391	1336	+55	28	Advance to Elite Gold
6	Spirou	18	9	9	1396	1375	+21	27	Advance to Elite Silver
7	Limburg United	18	8	10	1414	1460	−46	26	Advance to Elite Silver
8	Okapi Aalst	18	5	13	1338	1425	−87	23	Advance to Elite Silver
9	Phoenix Brussels	18	2	16	1305	1537	−232	20	Advance to Elite Silver
10	Liège Basket	18	2	16	1339	1568	−229	20	Advance to Elite Silver

Source: BNXT League

==== Results ====
Home \ Away	ANT	BRU	LEU	LIE	LIM	MEC	MON	OKA	OOS	SPI
Antwerp Giants	—	80–74	68–88	87–66	94–82	85–90	73–62	103–95	85–88	90–81
Phoenix Brussels	65–103	—	70–75	90–98	77–82	76–112	85–88	78–72	51–105	71–85
Leuven Bears	84–67	77–62	—	78–62	73–59	75–69	96–91	103–73	77–90	87–92
Liège Basket	75–100	71–86	94–97	—	79–92	99–103	72–84	70–55	65–112	65–91
Limburg United	72–81	72–69	72–71	86–83	—	78–98	67–68	90–73	81–88	67–72
Kangoeroes Mechelen	79–75	79–74	74–65	82–72	89–86	—	88–86	71–77	76–79	82–68
Mons-Hainaut	83–71	103–69	71–68	67–61	86–90	82–81	—	87–84	70–88	83–73
Okapi Aalst	69–91	78–62	68–57	77–71	79–72	87–92	68–69	—	74–79	55–68
Oostende	111–91	80–78	79–56	98–64	99–82	89–76	79–53	88–84	—	100–90
Spirou	65–83	77–68	75–64	83–72	81–84	79–88	70–73	74–70	72–73	—

Source: DBL
Legend: Blue = home team win; Red = away team win.

== International Round ==
=== Elite Gold ===
==== Standings ====
Pos	Team	Pld	W	L	PF	PA	PD	Pts	Qualification
1	(Belgium) Oostende	10	8	2	2460	2050	+410	36	Advance to National Playoffs Semifinals (BE)
2	(Belgium) Kangoeroes Mechelen	10	8	2	2292	2096	+196	34	Advance to National Playoffs Semifinals (BE)
3	(Netherlands) ZZ Leiden	10	6	4	2489	2053	+436	33	Advance to National Playoffs Semifinals (NL)
4	(Belgium) Leuven Bears	10	8	2	2175	2031	+144	32	Advance to National Playoffs Quarterfinals (BE)
5	(Netherlands) Heroes Den Bosch	10	4	6	2423	2132	+291	31	Advance to National Playoffs Semifinals (NL)
6	(Belgium) Antwerp Giants	10	6	4	2393	2204	+189	31	Advance to National Playoffs Quarterfinals (BE)
7	(Netherlands) Donar	10	5	5	2206	2025	+181	30	Advance to National Playoffs Quarterfinals (NL)
8	(Belgium) Mons-Hainaut	10	5	5	2200	2170	+30	30	Advance to National Playoffs Quarterfinals (BE)
9	(Netherlands) Landstede Hammers	10	0	10	2228	2230	−2	25	Advance to National Playoffs Quarterfinals (NL)
10	(Netherlands) Feyenoord	10	0	10	2085	2258	−173	24	Advance to National Playoffs Quarterfinals (NL)

Source: BNXT League

==== Results ====
Home \ Away	ANT	DON	FEY	HDB	LAN	LEU	MEC	MON	OOS	ZZL
Antwerp Giants	—	93–95	98–65	69–53	102–70	—	—	—	—	83–92
Donar	81–75	—	—	—	—	68–72	71–66	81–75	70–87	—
Feyenoord	71–91	—	—	—	—	61–67	0–20	54–73	69–72	—
Heroes Den Bosch	95–81	—	—	—	—	76–74	75–76	83–80	75–66	—
Landstede Hammers	61–78	—	—	—	—	57–82	56–70	85–86	76–86	—
Leuven Bears	—	88–83	78–72	84–65	87–61	—	—	—	—	86–57
Kangoeroes Mechelen	—	86–61	104–74	84–66	92–84	—	—	—	—	98–93
Mons-Hainaut	—	74–83	76–67	88–85	102–95	—	—	—	—	74–80
Oostende	—	98–74	96–81	100–69	83–54	—	—	—	—	78–70
ZZ Leiden	92–96	—	—	—	—	95–66	84–67	74–66	87–69	—

Source: BNXT League
Legend: Blue = home team win; Red = away team win.

=== Elite Silver ===
==== Standings ====
Pos	Team	Pld	W	L	PF	PA	PD	Pts	Qualification
1	(Belgium) Spirou	10	10	0	2323	1994	+329	34	Advance to National Playoffs Quarterfinals (BE)
2	(Belgium) Limburg United	10	8	2	2331	2216	+115	31	Advance to BNXT Playoffs
3	(Belgium) Okapi Aalst	10	9	1	2242	2060	+182	31	Advance to BNXT Playoffs
4	(Netherlands) Aris Leeuwarden	10	5	5	2318	2399	−81	28	Advance to National Playoffs Quarterfinals (NL)
5	(Netherlands) BAL	10	5	5	1994	2220	−226	27	Advance to BNXT Playoffs
6	(Belgium) Phoenix Brussels	10	7	3	2112	2264	−152	27	Advance to BNXT Playoffs
7	(Belgium) Liège Basket	10	6	4	2160	2356	−196	26	Advance to BNXT Playoffs
8	(Netherlands) Yoast United	10	1	9	2253	2458	−205	24	Advance to BNXT Playoffs
9	(Netherlands) Apollo Amsterdam	10	2	8	1991	2351	−360	24	Advance to BNXT Playoffs
10	(Netherlands) Den Helder Suns	10	2	8	2177	2538	−361	24	Advance to BNXT Playoffs
11	(Netherlands) The Hague Royals	10	0	10	1846	2568	−722	20	

Source: BNXT League

==== Results ====
Home \ Away	AMS	ARI	BAL	BRU	DHE	LIE	LIM	OKA	SPI	THR	YOA
Apollo Amsterdam	—	—	—	66–81	—	87–78	76–89	66–102	—	88–80	—
Aris Leeuwarden	79–62	—	—	75–85	—	103–87	—	82–75	79–93	—	—
BAL	—	—	—	62–56	—	68–70	83–78	58–68	65–80	—	—
Phoenix Brussels	—	90–91	77–83	—	99–87	—	—	—	—	85–71	89–81
Den Helder Suns	—	—	—	—	—	90–79	70–85	66–86	73–113	—	80–85
Liège Basket	76–62	89–80	82–84	—	85–72	—	—	—	—	87–67	—
Limburg United	91–75	91–94	91–65	—	113–66	—	—	—	—	—	75–74
Okapi Aalst	118–65	87–75	88–56	—	—	—	—	—	—	98–40	97–69
Spirou	71–61	92–50	—	—	98–50	—	—	—	—	95–58	81–66
The Hague Royals	—	—	—	53–82	82–94	—	69–93	58–85	60–111	—	—
Yoast United	—	—	59–85	58–63	—	75–88	84–111	—	57–93	—	—

Source: BNXT League
Legend: Blue = home team win; Red = away team win.

== National Playoffs ==
In the national playoffs, quarterfinals were played best-of-three format (1–1–1), semifinals and finals were played in a best-of-five format (1-1-1-1–1).

=== Netherlands ===
Heroes Den Bosch won its seventeenth national title, ending a 7-year drought, after beating ZZ Leiden in the finals. Thomas van der Mars was named the Finals MVP.

==== Bracket ====
Quarterfinals; 3–7 May
4	Landstede Hammers	2
5	Feyenoord	0
3	Donar	2
6	Aris Leeuwarden	1

Semifinals; 10–14 May
1	ZZ Leiden	3
4	Landstede Hammers	0
2	Heroes Den Bosch	3
3	Donar	0

Finals; 21 May–29 May
1	ZZ Leiden	2
2	Heroes Den Bosch	3

==== Quarterfinals ====
Team 1	Series	Team 2	Game 1	Game 2	Game 3
Donar (Netherlands)	2–1	(Netherlands) Aris Leeuwarden	69–72	99–62	99–82
Landstede Hammers (Netherlands)	2–0	(Netherlands) Feyenoord	88–79	81–71	–

==== Semifinals ====
Team 1	Series	Team 2	Game 1	Game 2	Game 3	Game 4	Game 5
ZZ Leiden (Netherlands)	3–0	(Netherlands) Landstede Hammers	91–79	89–79	71–69	–	–
Heroes Den Bosch (Netherlands)	3–0	(Netherlands) Donar	77–65	73–67	81–72	–	–

==== Finals ====
Team 1	Series	Team 2	Game 1	Game 2	Game 3	Game 4	Game 5
ZZ Leiden (Netherlands)	2–3	(Netherlands) Heroes Den Bosch	83–92	90–74	87–68	52–61	74–81

=== Belgium ===
==== Bracket ====
Quarterfinals; 3–7 May
4	Antwerp Giants	1
5	Mons-Hainaut	2
3	Leuven Bears	2
6	Spirou	1

Semifinals; 10–18 May
1	Oostende	3
4	Mons-Hainaut	0
2	Kangoeroes Mechelen	3
3	Leuven Bears	2

Finals; 21–27 May
1	Oostende	3
2	Kangoeroes Mechelen	1

==== Quarterfinals ====
Team 1	Series	Team 2	Game 1	Game 2	Game 3
Leuven Bears (Belgium)	2–1	(Belgium) Spirou	80–63	66–73	90–77
Antwerp Giants (Belgium)	1–2	(Belgium) Mons-Hainaut	111–79	73–77	64–74

==== Semifinals ====
Team 1	Series	Team 2	Game 1	Game 2	Game 3	Game 4	Game 5
Oostende (Belgium)	3–0	(Belgium) Mons-Hainaut	84–66	78–63	90–48	–	–
Kangoeroes Mechelen (Belgium)	3–2	(Belgium) Leuven Bears	63–72	86–40	78–75	86–95	77–69

==== Finals ====
Team 1	Series	Team 2	Game 1	Game 2	Game 3	Game 4	Game 5
Oostende (Belgium)	3–1	(Belgium) Kangoeroes Mechelen	103–60	74–84	86–69	91–83	–

== BNXT Playoffs ==
The highest ranked team before the start of the playoffs, always had the home court advantage. This means that they always played the last game of a playoff series or a home and away matchup at home.

=== First round ===
Team 1	Agg.	Team 2	1st leg	2nd leg
Den Helder Suns (Netherlands)	163–201	(Belgium) Limburg United	79–93	84–108
Liège Basket (Belgium)	145–147	(Belgium) Phoenix Brussels	65–72	80–75
Yoast United (Netherlands)	152–163	(Netherlands) BAL	82–82	70–81
Apollo Amsterdam (Netherlands)	128–179	(Belgium) Okapi Aalst	71–91	57–88

=== Second round ===
Team 1	Agg.	Team 2	1st leg	2nd leg
Limburg United (Belgium)	160–136	(Belgium) Spirou	84–75	76–61
Phoenix Brussels (Belgium)	155–180	(Belgium) Telenet Giants Antwerp	63–95	92–85
BAL (Netherlands)	138–158	(Netherlands) Feyenoord	69–68	69–90
Aris Leeuwarden (Netherlands)	128–161	(Belgium) Okapi Aalst	61–78	67–83

=== Third round ===
Team 1	Agg.	Team 2	1st leg	2nd leg
Limburg United (Belgium)	158–188	(Netherlands) Donar	70–78	88–110
Landstede Hammers (Netherlands)	118–183	(Belgium) Telenet Giants Antwerp	79–89	39–94
Feyenoord (Netherlands)	143–162	(Belgium) Mons-Hainaut	72–74	71–88
Okapi Aalst (Belgium)	137–147	(Belgium) Leuven Bears	71–73	66–74

=== Fourth round ===
Team 1	Agg.	Team 2	1st leg	2nd leg
Donar (Netherlands)	185–165	(Belgium) Telenet Giants Antwerp	97–63	88–102
Mons-Hainaut (Belgium)	130–151	(Belgium) Leuven Bears	74–69	55–82

=== Quarterfinals ===
Team 1	Agg.	Team 2	1st leg	2nd leg
Donar (Netherlands)	173–171	(Belgium) Kangoeroes Mechelen	84–86	89–85
Leuven Bears (Belgium)	141–149	(Netherlands) ZZ Leiden	82–68	59–81

=== Semifinals ===
Team 1	Agg.	Team 2	1st leg	2nd leg
Donar (Netherlands)	169–168	(Netherlands) Heroes Den Bosch	68–68	101–100
ZZ Leiden (Netherlands)	172–160	(Belgium) Oostende	84–82	88–78

=== Finals ===
Team 1	Agg.	Team 2	1st leg	2nd leg
Donar (Netherlands)	142–146	(Netherlands) ZZ Leiden	72–75	70–71

== Individual awards ==
The individual awards will be given during an award show held in Lint on 30 April 2022.

Category	Player	Team	Nominees	Ref.
Most Valuable Player (MVP)	(United States) Levi Randolph	(Belgium) Filou Oostende	(Denmark) Asbjørn Midtgaard (Netherlands) Emmanuel Nzekwesi (United States) Levi Randolph	
BNXT Finals MVP	(Netherlands) Worthy de Jong	(Netherlands) ZZ Leiden	–	
Belgian Playoff Finals MVP	(Netherlands) Keye van der Vuurst de Vries	(Belgium) Filou Oostende	–	
Dutch Playoff Finals MVP	(Netherlands) Thomas van der Mars	(Netherlands) Heroes Den Bosch	–	
Dream Team	(United States) Myles Stephens	(Belgium) Kangoeroes Mechelen	–	
Dream Team	(United States) Levi Randolph	(Belgium) Filou Oostende	–	
Dream Team	(Netherlands) Emmanuel Nzekwesi	(Belgium) Belfius Mons-Hainaut	–	
Dream Team	(Denmark) Asbjørn Midtgaard	(Netherlands) ZZ Leiden	–	
Dream Team	(Belgium) Wen Mukubu	(Belgium) Kangoeroes Mechelen	–	
Dutch Player of the Year	(Netherlands) Worthy de Jong	(Netherlands) ZZ Leiden	(Netherlands) Worthy de Jong (Netherlands) Ralf de Pagter (Netherlands) Thomas van der Mars	
Belgian Player of the Year	(Belgium) Wen Mukubu	(Belgium) Kangoeroes Mechelen	(Belgium) Pierre-Antoine Gillet (Belgium) Domien Loubry (Belgium) Wen Mukubu	
Rising Star of the Year (Netherlands)	(Netherlands) Sander Hollanders	(Netherlands) BAL	(Netherlands) Sander Hollanders (Netherlands) José Dimitri Maconda (Netherlands) Stan van den Elzen	
Rising Star of the Year (Belgium)	(Belgium) Haris Bratanovic	(Belgium) Filou Oostende	(Belgium) Haris Bratanovic (Belgium) Joppe Mennes (Belgium) Niels Van Den Eynde	
Sixth Man of the Year	(Finland) Mikael Jantunen	(Belgium) Filou Oostende	(Netherlands) Worthy de Jong (Finland) Mikael Jantunen (Belgium) Domien Loubry	
Defensive Player of the Year	(Netherlands) Worthy de Jong	(Netherlands) ZZ Leiden	(Netherlands) Worthy de Jong (United States) Josh Heat (Belgium) Wen Mukubu	
Coach of the Year (Netherlands)	(Netherlands) Geert Hammink	(Netherlands) ZZ Leiden	(Netherlands) Geert Hammink (Netherlands) Vincent van Sliedregt (Serbia) Radenko Varagić	
Coach of the Year (Belgium)	(Belgium) Kristof Michiels	(Belgium) Kangoeroes Mechelen	(Belgium) Eddy Casteels (Belgium) (Croatia) Dario Gjergja (Belgium) Kristof Michiels	
Referee of the Year (Netherlands)	(Netherlands) Tijmen Last	–	(Netherlands) Arnoud van Bochove (Netherlands) Tijmen Last (Netherlands) John Van Dam	
Referee of the Year (Belgium)	(Belgium) Nick van den Broeck	–	(Belgium) Renaud Geller (Belgium) Nick van den Broeck (Belgium) Samir Krehic	
Lifetime Achievement	(Netherlands) Ton Boot	–	–	
Lifetime Achievement	(Belgium) Arthur Goethals	–	–	

== Statistics ==
The following were the statistical leaders in the 2021–22 regular season.

=== Individual statistic leaders ===
Category	Player	Team(s)	Statistic
Points per game	Emmanuel Nzekwesi	Belfius Mons-Hainaut	20.1
Rebounds per game	Yarick Brussen	Den Helder Suns	9.2
Assists per game	Elvar Már Friðriksson	Telenet Giants Antwerp	7.3
Steals per game	Worthy de Jong	ZZ Leiden	2.5
Blocks per game	Shaquille Doorson	Aris Leeuwarden	1.9
Turnovers per game	Deividas Kumelis	The Hague Royals	4.2
Minutes per game	Joshua Heath	Leuven Bears	34.2
Efficiency per game	Noah Dahlman	Landstede Hammers	25.2
FG%	Emmanuel Nzekwesi	Belfius Mons-Hainaut	57.8%
3P%	Pierre-Antoine Gillet	Filou Oostende	50.0%

=== Individual game highs ===
Category	Player	Team	Statistic
Points	Ben Kovac	Den Helder Suns	43
Rebounds	Nate Grimes	Kangoeroes Mechelen	22
Assists	Anthony Collins	Feyenoord	15
Steals	Roger Moute a Bidias	Apollo Amsterdam	8
Steals	Nate Britt	Yoast United	8
Steals	Marlon Makwa	Spirou	8
Blocks	Berend Weijs	Apollo Amsterdam	6
Blocks	Amida Brimah	Filou Oostende	6
Three pointers	Austin Price	Heroes Den Bosch	9
