= Apollo Amsterdam past rosters =

This pages shows recent rosters of the professional basketball club Apollo Amsterdam based in Amsterdam, Netherlands.

== 2012-2013 ==
Results

- (Netherlands) Dutch Basketball League: 9th
- (Netherlands) NBB Cup: Quarterfinals

Roster

- 4 (Netherlands) Jirian Roodheuvel
- 5 (Netherlands) Jos van der Laan
- 6 (Netherlands) Aron Royé
- 7 (Netherlands) Patrick Faydherbe
- 8 (Netherlands) Jeremy Ormskerk
- 9 (Netherlands) Ramon Siljade
- 10 (Netherlands) Harvey van Stein
- 11 (Netherlands) Jesse Markusse
- 12 (Netherlands) Maurits Pieper
- 13 (Netherlands) Joel Brandt
- 14 (Netherlands) Berend Weijs
- 15 (France) Daacarim Soares

== 2013-2014 ==
Results

- (Netherlands) Dutch Basketball League: 8th + Quarterfinalist
- (Netherlands) NBB Cup: Round of 16

Roster

- 4 (Netherlands) Jeffrey de Vries
- 5 (Netherlands) Jos van der Laan
- 6 (Netherlands) Aron Royé
- 7 (Netherlands) Mark Ridderhof
- 8 (Netherlands) Yannick Brunink
- 9 (Netherlands) Gian Slagter
- 10 (Netherlands) Berend Weijs
- 11 (Netherlands) Julius van Sauers
- 12 (Netherlands) Andrew Dawson
- 13 (Netherlands) Joël Brandt
- 14 (Netherlands) Lucas Steijn
- 15 (Netherlands) Robert Krabbendam
- HC: (Netherlands) Hakim Salem
- AC: (Netherlands) Patrick Faydherbe

== 2014-2015 ==
Results

- NBB Cup: Round of 16

BC Apollo roster
Players
Coaches

Pos.	No.	Nat.	Name
G/F	4	(Netherlands)	Kherrazi, Hicham
SG	5	(Netherlands)	van der Laan, Jos
PG	6	(Netherlands)	Royé, Aron
G	7	(Netherlands)	Candiff, Oscar
G	8	(Netherlands)	Mulder, Stefan
G/F	9	(Netherlands)	Slagter, Gian
F/C	10	(Netherlands)	van Schaik, Max
SF	11	(Netherlands)	van Sauers, Julius
C	12	(Netherlands)	Markusse, Jesse
PG	13	(Netherlands)	van der Horst, Dimeo
PF	14	(Russia)	Fedosov, Vasily
PF	15	(Suriname)	de Randamie, Sergio

Head coach

(Estonia) Jaanus Liivak

Assistant coach(es)

(Netherlands) Patrick Faydherbe

Legend

- (C) Team captain
- Injured

- Roster
Updated: 27 January 2015

== 2020–21 ==
Apollo Amsterdam roster
Players
Coaches

Pos.	No.	Nat.	Name	Ht.	Age
G	0	(Netherlands)	Rebergen, Ids	1.90 m (6 ft 3 in)	24 – 11 September 2000
G	1	(Netherlands)	de Moes, Onne	1.90 m (6 ft 3 in)	25 – 19 December 1999
G	3	(Netherlands)	Faijdherbe, Lucas	1.93 m (6 ft 4 in)	26 – 14 July 1998
G	4	(Netherlands)	Bottelier, Keyshawn	1.88 m (6 ft 2 in)	25 – 7 September 1999
PF	5	(Netherlands)	Samson, Skip	1.97 m (6 ft 6 in)	25 – 31 December 1999
PF	8	(Suriname)	De Randamie, Sergio	2.00 m (6 ft 7 in)	40 – 5 July 1984
G	9	(Israel)	Hasson, Noam	1.91 m (6 ft 3 in)	26 – 20 July 1998
PF	13	(Netherlands)	Versteeg, Floris (C)	2.06 m (6 ft 9 in)	30 – 22 October 1994
G	17	(Italy)	Orsini, Renato	1.89 m (6 ft 2 in)	25 – 31 December 1999

Head coach

- (Netherlands) Edwin van der Hart

Legend

- (C) Team captain
- Injured

- Roster
Updated: 10 September 2020
