= 2019–20 Dutch Basketball League =

Dutch Basketball League
- Season: 2019–20
- Dates: 28 September 2019 – 20 March 2020 (Note: The 2019–20 season was ended on 20 March 2020, no champions were named.)
- Teams: 9

Finals
- Champions: None

Statistical leaders
Points	(United States) Xavier Cannefax	21.9
Rebounds	(Netherlands) Mohamed Kherrazi	8.8
Assists	(United States) Tayler Persons	7.4

The 2019–20 Dutch Basketball League (DBL) was the 60th season of the Dutch Basketball League, the highest professional basketball league in the Netherlands. The regular season started on 28 September.

On 12 March 2020, the season was postponed until 31 March because of the COVID-19 pandemic. On 14 March, the DBL announced to suspend the competition to at least 2 May. On 20 March, the DBL cancelled the rest of the season while naming no champion. Landstede Hammers qualified for the Basketball Champions League (BCL) based on the standings at the time.

== Format changes ==
From this season, the DBL adopted FIBA's home-grown players rule. Teams need to have at least 4 (for a 10-man roster) or 5 (for a 12-man roster) home-grown players on their roster. Due to this new rule, the previous limitation of maximum five foreign players, is dropped.

== Teams ==
Location of teams in the 2019–20 Dutch Basketball League

On 4 May 2019, the DBL announced all nine teams from the last season would return, excluding Dutch Windmills which was dissolved. TBG Dragons from Nijmegen was planning to make its debut season, depending on the club being able to meet all license requirements. On 28 June, the DBL announced the Dragons withdrew.

=== Arenas and locations ===
Club	Location	Venue	Capacity
Apollo Amsterdam	Amsterdam	Apollohal	1,500
Aris Leeuwarden	Leeuwarden	Kalverdijkje	1,700
BAL	Weert	Sporthal Boshoven	1,000
Den Helder Suns	Den Helder	Sporthal Sportlaan	1,000
Donar	Groningen	MartiniPlaza	4,350
Heroes Den Bosch	's-Hertogenbosch	Maaspoort	2,800
Feyenoord	Rotterdam	Topsportcentrum Rotterdam	1,000
Landstede Hammers	Zwolle	Landstede Sportcentrum	1,200
ZZ Leiden	Leiden	Vijf Meihal	2,000

=== Personnel and sponsorship ===
Team	Head coach	Team captain	Kit manufacturer	Shirt sponsor
Apollo Amsterdam	(Netherlands) Patrick Faijdherbe	(Netherlands) Berend Weijs	Nike	Paul Meijering Steel
Aris Leeuwarden	(Belgium) Ferried Naciri	(Poland) Andrzej Mazurczak	Jako	Friezon
BAL	(Serbia) Radenko Varagić	(Netherlands) Roel van Overbeek	Spalding	
Den Helder Suns	(Netherlands) Peter van Noord	(Netherlands) Boyd van der Vuurst de Vries	Burned	
Donar	(Netherlands) Erik Braal	(Netherlands) Thomas Koenis	Macron	Amysoft
Heroes Den Bosch	(Belgium) Jean-Marc Jaumin	(Netherlands) Stefan Wessels	Macron	Data City
Feyenoord	(Netherlands) Toon van Helfteren	(United States) Keyshawn Woods	Adidas	Zeeuw & Zeeuw
Landstede Hammers	(Netherlands) Herman van den Belt	(United Kingdom) Nigel van Oostrum	Acerbis	Landstede
ZZ Leiden	(Netherlands) Rolf Franke	(Netherlands) Worthy de Jong	Peak	Zorg en Zekerheid

=== Coaching changes ===
Team	Outgoing manager	Manner of departure	Date of vacancy	Position in table	Incoming manager	Date of appointment
Feyenoord	(Netherlands) Jan Stalman (interim)	End of interim spell	1 May 2019	Pre-season	(Netherlands) Toon van Helfteren	15 April 2019
Aris Leeuwarden	(Netherlands) Anne van Dijk (interim)	End of interim spell	1 May 2019	Pre-season	(Belgium) Ferried Naciri	5 June 2019
Heroes Den Bosch	(Croatia) Ivica Skelin	End of contract	23 June 2019	Pre-season	(Belgium) Jean-Marc Jaumin	23 June 2019

== Regular season ==
=== League table ===
Pos	Team	Pld	W	L	PF	PA	PD	Pts	Qualification
1	Landstede Hammers	20	17	3	1743	1483	+260	34	
2	Donar	22	17	5	1878	1510	+368	34	Qualification to Champions League qualifying rounds (Note: Initially, the first six teams would qualify for the playoffs (the first two for the semifinals, the other four quarterfinals). However, due to the interruption of the league, the playoffs were suspended. As first club in the standings, Landstede Hammers qualifies for the 2020–21 Basketball Champions League, but Donar was granted spot instead.)
3	Heroes Den Bosch	23	16	7	1933	1620	+313	32	Qualification to FIBA Europe Cup (Note: Landstede Hammers declined its invitation for the FIBA Europe Cup.)
4	ZZ Leiden	21	12	9	1665	1624	+41	24	
5	Zeeuw & Zeeuw Feyenoord	22	12	10	1715	1693	+22	24	
6	BAL	24	9	15	1607	1828	−221	18	
7	Den Helder Suns	23	7	16	1613	1839	−226	14	
8	Aris Leeuwarden	24	7	17	1548	1806	−258	14	
9	Apollo Amsterdam	23	4	19	1616	1915	−299	8	

Source: DBL

=== Results ===
Home \ Away	AMS	LEE	BAL	DHE	DON	FEY	NHO	LAN	ZZL	AMS	LEE	BAL	DHE	DON	FEY	NHO	LAN	ZZL
Apollo Amsterdam	—	80–68	59–76	103–79	71–86	61–70	57–103	84–96	81–100	—	–	76–75	73–77	–	84–68	67–90	–	–
Aris Leeuwarden	86–78	—	72–80	78–67	70–103	74–75	60–85	86–99	20–0	81–75	—	60–48	–	–	–	–	71–73	66–60
BAL	75–73	74–62	—	72–81	48–97	69–82	54–77	62–89	84–77	–	59–60	—	76–73	53–76	77–61	–	–	–
Den Helder Suns	93–77	74–63	72–67	—	72–100	72–79	66–79	78–92	91–75	–	76–51	–	—	70–88	–	–	–	–
Donar	100–53	73–63	89–52	109–65	—	74–68	91–75	–	–	83–72	–	91–54	–	—	–	79–69	–	–
Zeeuw & Zeeuw Feyenoord	93–71	98–62	70–84	91–71	102–93	—	67–57	–	79–82	–	73–43	–	91–76	79–66	—	–	–	–
Heroes Den Bosch	113–67	82–71	84–61	94–69	65–59	98–86	—	71–57	109–83	–	98–59	76–83	90–63	–	91–62	—	–	–
Landstede Hammers	79–66	103–62	78–54	89–57	77–70	103–63	93–80	—	92–75	102–71	–	–	–	69–98	89–77	–	—	92–84
ZZ Leiden	79–66	73–62	93–70	89–65	72–80	103–63	93–80	82–73	—	–	–	–	90–79	81–73	–	78–69	92–98	—

Source: DBL
Legend: Blue = home team win; Red = away team win.

== Dutch clubs in European competitions ==
Team	Competition	Progress
Donar	Champions League	First qualifying round
Donar	FIBA Europe Cup	Regular season
Landstede Hammers	FIBA Europe Cup	Second round
ZZ Leiden	FIBA Europe Cup	Second round

== See also ==
- 2019–20 Dutch Basketball Cup
- 2019 Dutch Basketball Supercup
