= 2000–01 Eredivisie (basketball) =

Eredivisie
- Teams: 12

Regular season
- Season MVP: Chris McGuthrie (Donar)
- Relegated: C3 Cobra's Den Haag

Finals
- Champions: Ricoh Astronauts (3rd title)
- Runners-up: Vanilla Weert

Statistical leaders
| Points | Omar Sneed | 27.1 |

The 2000–01 Eredivisie season was the 41st season of the Eredivisie in basketball, the highest professional basketball league in the Netherlands. Ricoh Astronauts won their 3rd national title.

== Regular season ==
Each side played teams in their own group four times (twice home and twice away), while they played teams from other groups two times (once home and once away).

=== Group A ===
| Pos | Team | Pld | W | L | Qualification or relegation |
|---|---|---|---|---|---|
| 1 | Ricoh Astronauts | 32 | 24 | 8 | Qualification to play-offs |
| 2 | Conesco Den Helder | 32 | 21 | 11 | Qualification to play-offs |
| 3 | Image Center Werkendam | 32 | 19 | 13 | Qualification to play-offs |
| 4 | Omniworld Almere | 32 | 14 | 18 | Qualification to play-offs |
| 5 | NAC | 32 | 14 | 18 | |
| 6 | C3 Cobra's Den Haag (Note: C3 Cobra's Den Haag was relegated from the Eredivisie because of financial problems.) (R) | 32 | 5 | 27 | Relegated |

Source: DBL
(R) Relegated

=== Group B ===
| Pos | Team | Pld | W | L | Qualification or relegation |
|---|---|---|---|---|---|
| 1 | Vanilla Weert | 32 | 20 | 12 | Qualification to play-offs |
| 2 | MPC Donar | 32 | 19 | 13 | Qualification to play-offs |
| 3 | Canoe Jeans EBBC | 32 | 19 | 13 | Qualification to play-offs |
| 4 | EiffelTowers Nijmegen | 32 | 18 | 14 | Qualification to play-offs |
| 5 | Gunco Rotterdam | 32 | 11 | 21 | |
| 6 | Landstede Zwolle | 32 | 6 | 26 | |

Source: DBL

== Playoffs ==
=== Bracket ===
Quarterfinals
A1 | Ricoh Astronauts | 2
B4 | EiffelTowers Nijmegen | 0
B2 | MPC Donar | 2
A3 | Image Center Werkendam | 1
A2 | Conesco Den Helder | 0
B3 | Canoe Jeans EBBC | 2
B1 | Vanilla Weert | 2
A4 | BC Omniworld Almere | 0

Semifinals
A1 | Ricoh Astronauts | 3
B2 | MPC Donar | 0
B2 | Canoe Jeans EBBC | 2
B1 | Vanilla Weert | 3

Finals
A1 | Ricoh Astronauts | 4
B1 | Vanilla Weert | 2

=== Finals ===
21 April
19:30

Boxscore

Ricoh Astronauts 91, Vanilla Weert 70
| Pts: Joe Spinks 22; Rebs: Egidijus Mikalajūnas 7 Asts: Riley Inge 9 | Pts: Omar Sneed 19; Rebs: Omar Sneed 9 Asts: Omar Sneed 5 |
Astronauts lead series 1–0

Apollohal, Amsterdam

24 April
19:30

Boxscore

Vanilla Weert 82, Ricoh Astronauts 72
| Pts: Omar Sneed 30; Rebs: Jermaine Carlton 11; Asts: Omar Sneed 4 | Pts: Sydmill Harris 14; Rebs: Spinks, Bennes 7 each Asts: Chris McGuthrie 10 |
Series tied 1–1

Sporthal Boshoven, Weert

26 April
19:30

Boxscore

Ricoh Astronauts 106, Vanilla Weert 67
| Pts: Sydmill Harris 22; Rebs: Egidijus Mikalajūnas 9 Asts: Joe Spinks 6 | Pts: Jermaine Carlton 16; Rebs: Jermaine Carlton 12; Asts: Jermaine Carlton 4 |
Astronauts lead series 2–1

Apollohal, Amsterdam

28 April
19:30

Boxscore

Vanilla Weert 79, Ricoh Astronauts 78
| Pts: Omar Sneed 41; Rebs: Omar Sneed 10; Asts: Chatney Howard 6 | Pts: Chris McGuthrie 20; Rebs: Joe Spinks 10; Asts: Chris McGuthrie 9 |
Series tied 2–2

Sporthal Boshoven, Weert

1 May
19:30

Boxscore

Ricoh Astronauts 76, Vanilla Weert 51
| Pts: Spinks, Rouwhorst 11 each Rebs: Koen Rouwhorst 12; Asts: Riley Inge 6 | Pts: Omar Sneed 16; Rebs: Jermaine Carlton 10; Asts: Somefun, Barth 3 each |
Astronauts lead series 3–2

Apollohal, Amsterdam

3 May
19:30

Boxscore

Vanilla Weert 62, Ricoh Astronauts 78
| Pts: Omar Sneed 13; Rebs: Omar Sneed 10; Asts: Three players 4 each | Pts: Joe Spinks 27; Rebs: Joe Spinks 10; Asts: Mario Bennes 5 |
Astronauts win series 4–2

Sporthal Boshoven, Weert

== Individual awards ==
- Most Valuable Player: Chris McGuthrie (Ricoh Astronauts)
- Coach of the Year: Ton Boot (Ricoh Astronauts)
- Rookie of the Year: Sydmill Harris (Ricoh Astronauts)
- First-team All-Eredivisie:
  - Ryan Robertson (EiffelTowers Nijmegen)
  - Hakeem Ward (Den Helder)
  - Joe Spinks (Ricoh Astronauts)
  - Eric Nelson (EiffelTowers Nijmegen)
  - Lamont Randolph (MPC Donar)

== Individual statistical leaders ==
| Category | Player | Team(s) | Statistic |
|---|---|---|---|
| Points per game | Omar Sneed | Vanilla Weert | 27.1 |
| Rebounds per game | Lamont Randolph | Donar | 12.4 |
| Assists per game | Ed Norvell | Canoe Jeans EBBC | 9.1 |
| Steals per game | Joe Spinks | Ricoh Astronauts | 4.4 |
| Blocks per game | Eric Nelson | Omniworld Almere | 1.4 |
