= Ferried Naciri =

Belgian basketball coach

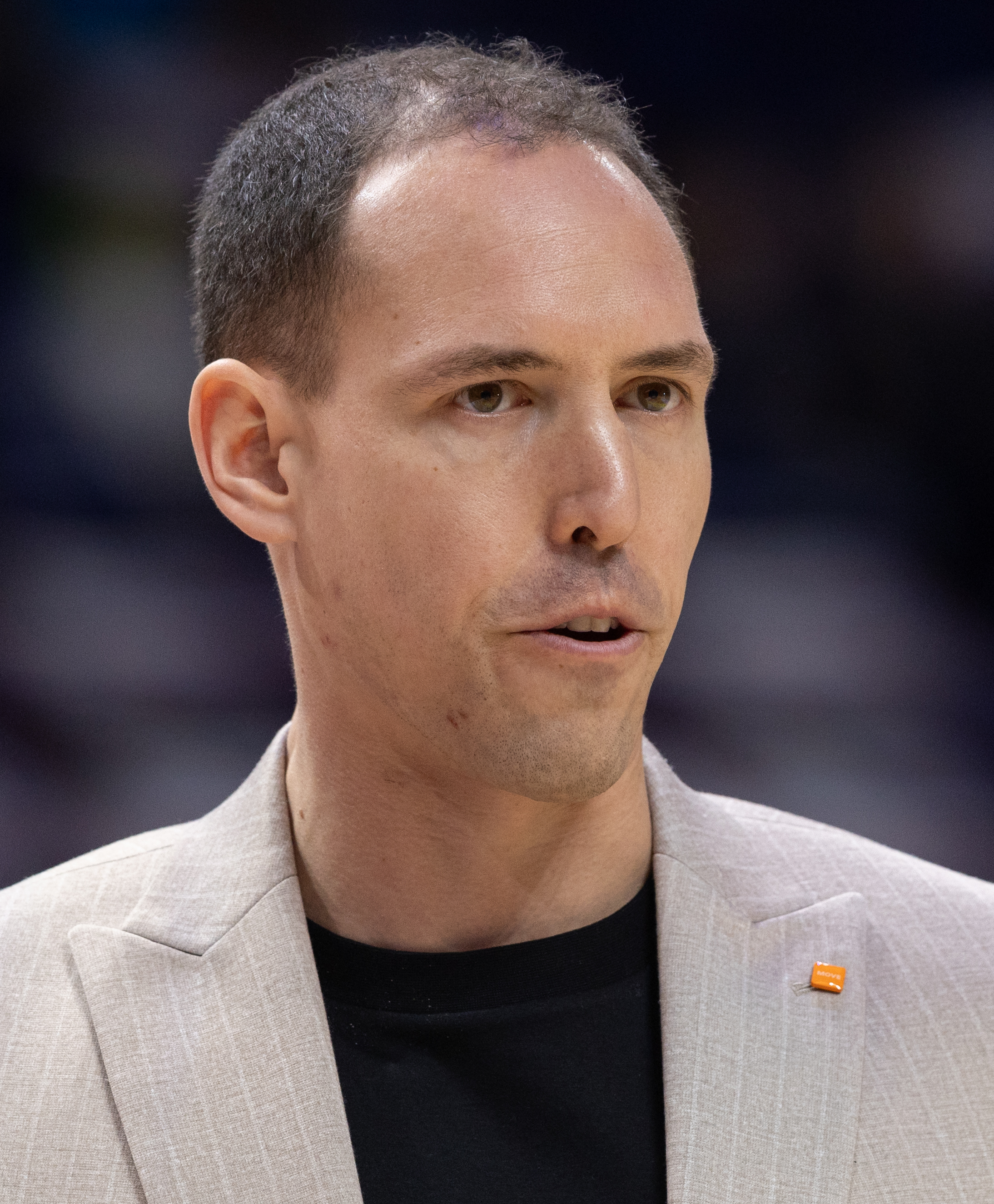
- Naciri as assistant coach of Basketball Löwen Braunschweig in 2025

Eisbären Bremerhaven
- Position: Head coach
- League: ProA

Personal information
- Born: 12 February 1989 (age 37) Mol, Belgium
- Coaching career: 2012–present

Career history

Coaching
- 2012–2013: DBC Houthalen (assistant)
- 2013–2014: Leuven Bears 2
- 2014–2017: Leuven Bears (assistant)
- 2017: Leuven Bears
- 2018–2019: Team FOG Næstved (assistant)
- 2019–2021: Aris Leeuwarden
- 2022–2025: EWE Baskets Oldenburg (assistant)
- 2025–2026: Löwen Braunschweig (assistant)
- 2026–present: Eisbären Bremerhaven

Ferried Naciri (born 12 February 1989) is a Belgian basketball coach. He is currently the head coach for Eisbären Bremerhaven of the second German division ProA. Naciri has been an assistant and head coach for clubs in Belgium, Denmark, Germany and the Netherlands.

== Coaching career ==
Naciri started coaching in 2004 with local youth teams.

In 2012, he was the assistant coach of the women's team of DBC Houthalen in the Belgian Women's League.

In 2013, he started his coaching career at Leuven Bears, initially training youth teams and the second team. In 2014, Naciri was appointed the assistant coach. In January 2017, he became the head coach of Leuven Bears in the Belgian Pro Basketball League. Naciri was replaced as Leuven head coach in December 2017.

He spent the 2018–19 season at Team FOG Næstved in Denmark as assistant coach under Chris Gillett.

Naciri signed with Aris Leeuwarden in the Netherlands for the 2019–20 season. He coached Aris to its first-ever NBB Cup final before the season was ended early because of the COVID-19 pandemic. After the 2020–21 season, he left Aris.

On July 21, 2022, Naciri signed with EWE Baskets Oldenburg of the Basketball Bundesliga (BBL) as an assistant coach.

On July 31, 2025, he signed with Löwen Braunschweig of the Basketball Bundesliga (BBL) as an assistant coach. Naciri was appointed head coach of German second-division side Eisbären Bremerhaven in June 2026.
