= TBG Dragons =

- Founded: 2015; 10 years ago
- Arena: Sporthal Horstacker
- Capacity: 1,200
- Location: Nijmegen, Gelderland, Netherlands
- President: Frans van de Geer
- Website: tbgdragons.nl
Home	Away

Top Basketbal Gelderland Dragons, known as TBG Dragons, is a Dutch basketball club based in Nijmegen, Gelderland. Founded in 2015, it is a club with focus on developing young players from Gelderland.

From 2015 until 2019, Dragons played their games in Wijchen. However, starting from August 2019 the team plans to play in Sporthal Horstacker in Nijmegen.

== History ==
After the dissolution of the professional club Matrixx Magixx, which played in Wijchen and Nijmegen, professional basketball in Gelderland disappeared. As a result TBG Dragons was founded, with the aim of providing high-level basketball for youth players.

TBG Dragons announced it had applied to play in the Dutch Basketball League (DBL) for the 2019–20 season. On 4 May 2019, the DBL announced that Dragons would be able to participate if it could meet all the licence requirements. On 28 June, the DBL announced that the Dragons withdrew from participating.
