= Sydmill Harris =

Dutch basketball player (born 1982)

Personal information
- Born: January 12, 1982 (age 44) Hoofddorp, Netherlands
- Listed height: 1.95 m (6 ft 5 in)
- Listed weight: 91 kg (201 lb)

Career information
- College: Texas (2001–2005)
- Playing career: 1999–2007
- Position: Guard

Career history
- 1999–2001: Amsterdam Astronauts
- 2005–2006: Teramo
- 2006: Matrixx Magixx
- 2006–2007: West-Brabant Giants

Career highlights
- DBL Rookie of the Year (2001)

Sydmill Harris (born January 12, 1982) is a Dutch former basketball player. After four years of college basketball with the Texas Longhorns, Harris played for Dutch Basketball League clubs Amsterdam Basketball, Matrixx Magixx and West-Brabant Giants. Harris is the son of Surinamese-born Dutch singer Oscar Harris.

Harris played 22 games for the Netherlands national team, after making his debut on 19 November 2000 against Belgium.

== Honours ==
- DBL Rookie of the Year (1): 2000–01
