= 2019–20 Dutch Basketball Cup =

2019–20 Basketball Cup
- Season: 2019–20
- Teams: 52

Finals
- Champions: No champions

The 2019–20 Basketball Cup is the 52nd edition of the Netherlands' national basketball cup tournament. This was the first season the competition was known as Basketball Cup instead of NBB Cup, as the national federation changed its name from NBB to Basketball Nederland. On 12 March 2020, competition was suspended as a result of the COVID-19 pandemic. This decision was made prior to the final, which was to be played by Donar and Aris Leeuwarden.

On 20 December 2020, it was announced that the final would not be played and no champions were named for the first time in the cup's history.

== Format ==
In the first, second and third round teams from the Dutch second, third and fourth division participate. From the fourth round, teams from the Dutch Basketball League (DBL) enter the competition. Quarter- and semi-finals are played in a two-legged format. When a team form a tier lower than the DBL played a DBL team, one win is sufficient for the latter to advance to the next round.

== Bracket ==
Round of 16
BV Hoofddorp	27
Donar	103
ZAC Landstede	47
Feyenoord	93
Virtus	47
Landstede Hammers	111
Heroes Den Bosch	89
ZZ Leiden	92
Lokomotief	67
Aris Leeuwarden	80
Apollo Amsterdam	88
BAL	79
SBU Utrecht	87
River Trotters	68
Dreamfield Dolphins	73
Den Helder Suns	83

Quarter-finals
Donar	92	73	165
Feyenoord	58	57	115
Landstede Hammers	88	98	186
ZZ Leiden	72	92	164
Aris Leeuwarden	86	71	157
Apollo Amsterdam	57	67	124
SBU Utrecht	47
Den Helder Suns	104

Semi-finals
Donar	71	93	164
Landstede Hammers	76	69	145
Aris Leeuwarden	58	67	125
Den Helder Suns	56	66	122

Final
Cancelled
Donar
Aris Leeuwarden

== Final ==
On 19 February 2020, the DBL announced the final was to be played in MartiniPlaza in Groningen on 29 March.

September 2020	Donar	Cancelled	Aris Leeuwarden	Groningen
				Arena: MartiniPlaza

== See also ==
- 2019–20 Dutch Basketball League
