= Freek Vos =

Dutch basketball player

Personal information
- Born: 7 January 1997 (age 29)
- Listed height: 201 cm (6 ft 7 in)

Career information
- Playing career: 2015–present
- Position: Center
- Number: 16

Career history
- 2015–2019: Landstede Zwolle

Career highlights
- DBL champion (2019); Dutch Supercup winner (2017); DBL Rookie of the Year (2016); DBL All-Rookie Team (2016)

Freek Vos (born 7 January 1997) is a Dutch professional basketball player, who last played for Landstede Basketbal of the Dutch Basketball League (DBL).

== Professional career ==
Vos started his professional career with Landstede Basketbal in the Dutch Basketball League in the 2015–16 season. In his rookie year, Vos averaged 2.0 points and 2.6 rebounds in 11.2 minutes per game on his way to winning the DBL Rookie of the Year award. In the 2018–19 season, Landstede won its first DBL championship.
