= Kai Edwards (basketball) =

Dutch basketball player (born 1997)

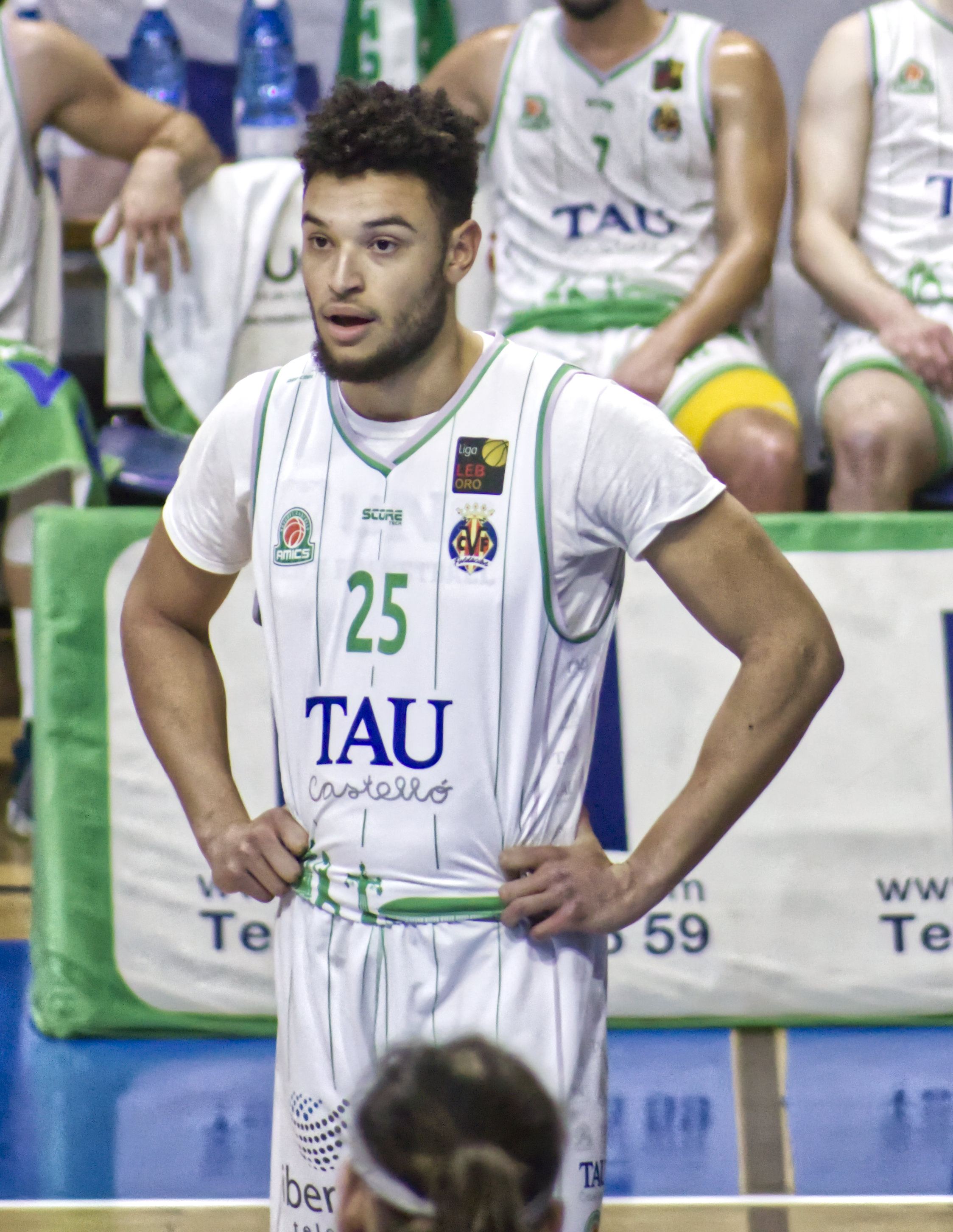
- Edwards with Castelló in 2022

No. 25 – Sangiorgese basket
- Position: Power forward
- League: Serie b1

Personal information
- Born: 10 August 1997 (age 29) Amsterdam, Netherlands
- Listed height: 2.06 m (6 ft 9 in)
- Listed weight: 102 kg (225 lb)

Career information
- High school: Het Amsterdams Lyceum (Amsterdam)
- College: Northern Colorado (2016–2020)
- NBA draft: 2020: undrafted
- Playing career: 2020–present

Career history
- 2020–2022: Castelló
- 2022–2023: Club Melilla Baloncesto
- 2023: Juaristi ISB
- 2023–2024: Feyenoord Basketball
- 2024–2025: Landstede Hammers
- 2025: CSU Sibiu
- 2025–present: Bakken Bears

Kai Simon Edwards (born 10 August 1997) is a Dutch professional basketball player for Bakken Bears of the Basketligaen. Born in Amsterdam, he played college basketball with Northern Colorado. He continued his career in Spain.

== Early career ==
Born in Amsterdam, Edwards is the son of a Dutch mother and Trinidadian father. He started playing basketball at age 15, after playing tennis in his middle and early high school years. He started his club career in the youth section of Apollo Amsterdam, where he played for their under-18 team. Edwards played for the Canarias Basketball Academy, a Spanish academy located at the Canary Islands.

== College career ==
Edwards received scholarship offers from three universities, and eventually committed to Northern Colorado.

== Professional career ==
Edwards started his career in August 2020, when he signed a one-year contract with Bahía San Agustín in the Spanish LEB Oro.

After playing the pre-season with Bahía San Augstín, Edwards signed with another LEB Oro team in Castelló, where he averaged 7 points and 4.7 rebounds in his rookie season. On 13 July 2021, Edwards extended his contract for another season averaging 6 points and 5 rebounds. On 18 July 2022, he signs for Club Melilla Baloncesto.

On 23 July 2023, Edwards returned to the Netherlands after he signed with Feyenoord Basketball.

On December 16, 2025, he signed with Bakken Bears of the Basketligaen.

== National team career ==
In July 2021, Edwards joined the training camp of the Netherlands senior team for the first time, along with his brother Jesse.

== Career statistics ==
Legend
GP	Games played	GS	Games started	MPG	Minutes per game
FG%	Field goal percentage	3P%	3-point field goal percentage	FT%	Free throw percentage
RPG	Rebounds per game	APG	Assists per game	SPG	Steals per game
BPG	Blocks per game	PPG	Points per game	**Bold**	Career high

=== College ===
Year	Team	GP	GS	MPG	FG%	3P%	FT%	RPG	APG	SPG	BPG	PPG
2016–17	Northern Colorado	29	11	16.2	.682	.000	.360	5.1	0.3	0.3	0.1	4.6
2017–18	Northern Colorado	29	1	7.0	.722	.000	.379	2.1	0.2	0.1	0.2	2.2
2018–19	Northern Colorado	**32**	**16**	20.1	**.760**	.000	.537	5.7	0.7	0.3	0.3	5.3
2019–20	Northern Colorado	31	0	**22.2**	.648	.000	**.596**	**7.1**	**0.8**	**0.4**	**0.4**	**9.4**
Career		121	28	16.6	.689	.000	.502	5.1	0.5	0.3	0.2	5.4

== Personal ==
Kai's younger brother Jesse also plays basketball, currently playing for West Virginia University.

At the University of Northern Colorado, he majored in business marketing.
