= Jesse Edwards (basketball) =

Dutch basketball player (born 2000)

Free agent
- Position: Center

Personal information
- Born: 18 March 2000 (age 26) Amsterdam, Netherlands
- Listed height: 2.13 m (7 ft 0 in)
- Listed weight: 107 kg (236 lb)

Career information
- High school: IMG Academy (Bradenton, Florida)
- College: Syracuse (2019–2023); West Virginia (2023–2024)
- NBA draft: 2024: undrafted
- Playing career: 2024–present

Career history
- 2024–2025: Minnesota Timberwolves
- 2024–2025: →Iowa Wolves
- 2025–2026: Melbourne United
- 2026: Baskonia

Career highlights
- Third-team All-ACC (2023); ACC All-Defensive team (2023)
- Stats at NBA.com
- Stats at Basketball Reference

Jesse David Edwards (born 18 March 2000) is a Dutch professional basketball player. He played college basketball for the Syracuse Orange and the West Virginia Mountaineers. Standing at 2.13 m (7 ft 0 in), he plays the center position. He also plays for the Netherlands men's national basketball team.

== Early life ==
Edwards was born in Amsterdam to a Dutch mother and a British father. He grew up with two siblings. He started playing basketball at age 14 and later joined the youth section of Apollo Amsterdam. After graduating Amsterdams Lyceum high school in the Netherlands, he went on to play on the Post Grad team for IMG Academy, a boarding school in Bradenton, Florida.

While playing for Apollo Amsterdam, he played together with Warriors' center Quinten Post.

Edwards received offers by Georgia Tech and Providence, among others. He committed to playing college basketball for Syracuse in April 2019.

College recruiting
| Name | Hometown | School | Height | Weight | Commit date |
|---|---|---|---|---|---|
| Jesse Edwards; C | Amsterdam, Netherlands | IMG Academy (FL) | 6 ft 10 in (2.08 m) | 205 lb (93 kg) | Apr 5, 2019 |
| Jesse Edwards; C | Recruit ratings: Rivals: 247Sports: ESPN: (79) | | | | |
Overall recruit ranking: Rivals: – 247Sports: – ESPN: –
Note: In many cases, Scout, Rivals, 247Sports, On3, and ESPN may conflict in their listings of height and weight.; In these cases, the average was taken. ESPN grades are on a 100-point scale.; Sources: "Syracuse 2019 Basketball Commitments". Rivals.; "2019 Syracuse Orange Recruiting Class". ESPN.; "2019 Team Ranking". Rivals.

== College career ==
Edwards averaged 2.4 points and 1.7 rebounds per game as a freshman. As a sophomore, he averaged 1.9 points and 2.6 rebounds per game. On 5 December 2021, he recorded his first career double-double, after recording 11 points and 12 rebounds against Florida State. On 8 February 2022, Edwards broke his left wrist during a game against Boston College, ending his season. He averaged 12 points and 6.5 rebounds per game as a junior, shooting 69.5 percent. In the 2022–23 season, Edwards averaged 14.5 points, 10.3 rebounds, and 2.7 blocks per game, shooting 59.2 percent.

In April 2023, Edwards transferred to West Virginia. He averaged 15.0 points on 61.3% shooting from the field, 8.0 rebounds and 1.7 blocks per game.

== Professional career ==
After going undrafted in the 2024 NBA draft, Edwards signed a two-way contract with the Minnesota Timberwolves on 9 July 2024. He was called minutes after the draft ended by the Timberwolves, he told ESPN Netherlands.

Edwards made his NBA debut on 2 March 2025 against the Phoenix Suns. He subbed in for Anthony Edwards for the remaining 1:35 of the fourth quarter. Edwards became the third Dutch player to make his NBA debut that season, following Malevy Leons and Quinten Post. On 1 August, Edwards was waived by the Timberwolves.

On 12 August 2025, Edwards signed with Melbourne United of the Australian National Basketball League (NBL).

On 10 March 2026, Edwards signed with Baskonia of the Liga ACB and the EuroLeague.

On July 10, 2026, Edwards signed with BC Roma of the Italian Lega Basket Serie A (LBA). However, on August 31, his contract was mutually terminated before appearing in any game.

== National team career ==
In July 2021, Edwards joined the training camp of the Netherlands senior team for the first time, along with his brother Kai. He was selected for the qualification games of the 2023 FIBA Basketball World Cup. On 2 July 2022, Edwards debuted in a 66–67 away loss against Iceland in which he had six points, seven rebounds, and two blocks in ten minutes of playing time.

In August 2022, Edwards rejoined the national team to participate in international competitions which includes World Cup qualifying and the Eurobasket. He was on the 12-man roster for EuroBasket 2022.

== Career statistics ==
Legend
| GP | Games played | GS | Games started | MPG | Minutes per game |
| FG% | Field goal percentage | 3P% | 3-point field goal percentage | FT% | Free throw percentage |
| RPG | Rebounds per game | APG | Assists per game | SPG | Steals per game |
| BPG | Blocks per game | PPG | Points per game | **Bold** | Career high |

=== NBA ===
| Year | Team | GP | GS | MPG | FG% | 3P% | FT% | RPG | APG | SPG | BPG | PPG |
|---|---|---|---|---|---|---|---|---|---|---|---|---|
| 2024–25 | Minnesota | 2 | 0 | 2.5 | – | – | – | .0 | .5 | .0 | .0 | .0 |
| Career | | 2 | 0 | 2.5 | – | – | – | .0 | .5 | .0 | .0 | .0 |

=== College ===
| Year | Team | GP | GS | MPG | FG% | 3P% | FT% | RPG | APG | SPG | BPG | PPG |
|---|---|---|---|---|---|---|---|---|---|---|---|---|
| 2019–20 | Syracuse | 21 | 0 | 6.9 | **.792** | — | .632 | 1.7 | .0 | .2 | .5 | 2.4 |
| 2020–21 | Syracuse | 18 | 0 | 8.9 | .462 | — | .714 | 2.6 | .0 | .3 | .4 | 1.9 |
| 2021–22 | Syracuse | 24 | 24 | 28.0 | .695 | — | .598 | 6.5 | 1.0 | 1.1 | **2.8** | 12.0 |
| 2022–23 | Syracuse | **32** | **32** | **32.5** | .592 | **1.000** | **.729** | **10.3** | **1.6** | **1.4** | 2.7 | 14.5 |
| 2023–24 | West Virginia | 23 | 22 | 28.2 | .613 | .000 | .523 | 8.0 | 1.2 | .6 | 1.7 | **15.0** |
| Career | | 118 | 78 | 22.6 | .623 | .200 | .619 | 6.4 | .9 | .8 | 1.8 | 10.0 |

== Personal life ==
His older brother Kai also plays basketball, currently plays for Landstede Hammers and played college basketball for Northern Colorado from 2016 to 2020.

== See also ==
- List of All-Atlantic Coast Conference men's basketball teams
