= Leuven Bears =

AB InBev Leuven Bears
- Leagues: BNXT League
- Founded: 1999; 27 years ago
- History: List: Telindus Leuven (1999–2001) Vastiau-Godeau Leuven (2001–2003) Basket Groot Leuven (2003–2007) Spotter Leuven (2007–2009) Leuven Bears (2009–present)
- Arena: Sportoase
- Capacity: 3,400
- Location: Leuven, Belgium
- Team colors: Black, orange, white
- Main sponsor: Stella Artois
- President: Ben De Goignies
- Head coach: Kristof Michiels
- Championships: 1 Belgian Cup
- Website: leuvenbears.be
Home	Away

Leuven Bears, for sponsorship reasons also called AB InBev Leuven Bears, is a Belgian professional basketball club from Leuven. The club competes in the BNXT League, the highest tier in Belgian basketball.

== History ==
The team has played in the Belgian First Division since 1999 and has participated in the Belgian Cup since 1954, winning the tournament in 2005. The Belgian Cup victory earned the team a place in the 2005–06 FIBA EuroCup where it finished fourth in its opening-round group and was eliminated.

Since the 2021–22 season, Leuven plays in the BNXT League, in which the national leagues of Belgium and the Netherlands have been merged.

== Honours and titles ==
- Belgian Cup
  - Winners (1): 2004–05
  - Runners-up (1): 2024–25

== Season by season ==
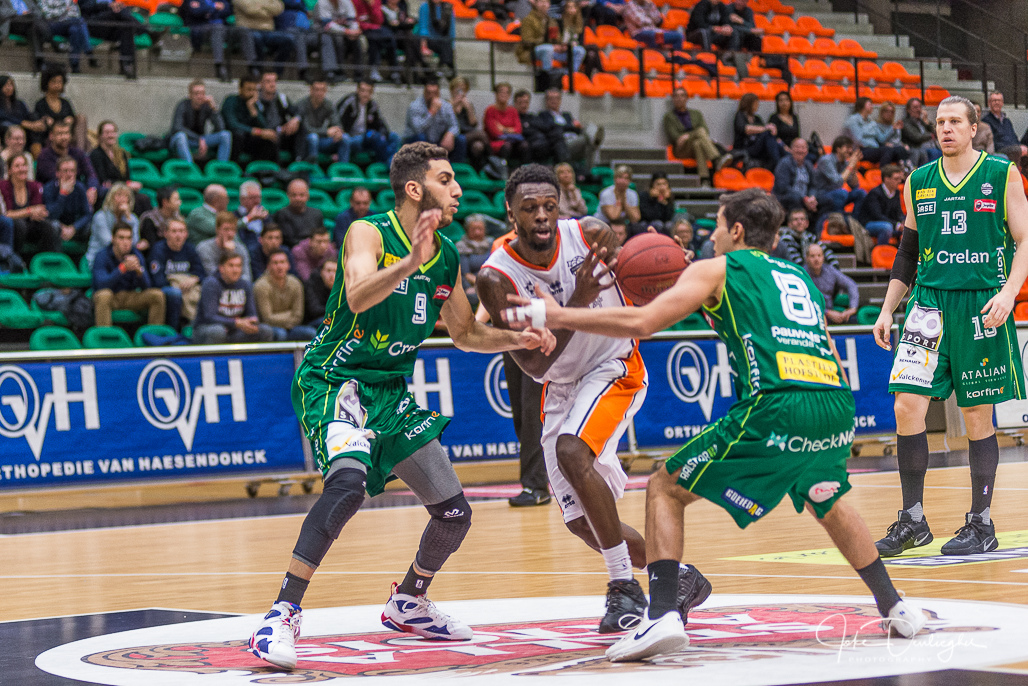
A home game of Leuven Bears in February 2017

Season	Tier	League	Pos.	Belgian Cup	European competitions
2002–03	1	BLB	5th		
2003–04	1	BLB	9th		
2004–05	1	BLB	6th		
2005–06	1	BLB	8th		3 FIBA EuroCup
2006–07	1	BLB	10th		
2007–08	1	BLB	9th		
2008–09	1	BLB	6th		
2009–10	1	BLB	9th		
2010–11	1	BLB	6th		
2011–12	1	BLB	6th	Semifinalist	
2012–13	1	BLB	6th	Quarterfinalist	
2013–14	1	BLB	7th	Quarterfinalist	
2014–15	1	BLB	11th	Quarterfinalist	
2015–16	1	BLB	11th	Quarterfinalist	
2016–17	1	BLB	9th	Quarterfinalist	
2017–18	1	BLB	10th	Round of 16	
2018–19	1	BLB	9th	Quarterfinalist	
2019–20	1	BLB	6th	Quarterfinalist	
2020–21	1	BLB	6th	Semifinalist	
2021–22	1	BNXT League	BE 3rd	Quarterfinalist	
2021–22	1	BNXT League	BNXT 4th	Quarterfinalist	
2022–23	1	BNXT League	BE 6th	Quarterfinalist	
2022–23	1	BNXT League	BNXT 11th	Quarterfinalist	
2023–24	1	BNXT League	BE 8th	Semifinalist	
2023–24	1	BNXT League	BNXT 13th	Semifinalist	
2024–25	1	BNXT League	BE 7th	Runners-up	
2024–25	1	BNXT League	BNXT 7th	Runners-up	
2025–26	1	BNXT League	BE 9th	Runners-up	
2025–26	1	BNXT League	BNXT 12th	Runners-up	

== Players ==
=== Current roster ===
Note: Flags indicate national team eligibility at FIBA-sanctioned events. Players may hold other non-FIBA nationalities not displayed.

AB InBev Leuven Bears roster
Players
Coaches

Pos.	No.	Nat.	Name	Ht.
G	1	(United States)	Thomas, Sebastian	1.85 m (6 ft 1 in)	23 – 30 September 2002
G	5	(Belgium)	Terclavers, Noa	1.93 m (6 ft 4 in)	17 – 14 March 2009
PG	6	(Belgium)	Schauvlieger, Steff	1.88 m (6 ft 2 in)	24 – 19 September 2002
G/F	7	(Belgium)	De Mol, Guillaume	1.93 m (6 ft 4 in)	20 – 8 August 2006
PG	9	(Belgium)	Solie, Stan	1.85 m (6 ft 1 in)	19 – 22 November 2006
F	10	(Belgium)	Waerniers, Tim	2.01 m (6 ft 7 in)	18 – 29 July 2008
PG	11	(Belgium)	Bucumi, Roel	1.94 m (6 ft 4 in)	23 – 11 August 2003
G	12	(Belgium)	Van De Vyver, Lowie	1.90 m (6 ft 3 in)	16 – 25 May 2010
F	17	(Greece)	Kazamias, Vasileios	1.96 m (6 ft 5 in)	19 – 10 March 2007
C	18	(Belgium)	Nørulf, Skye	2.12 m (6 ft 11 in)	19 – 30 December 2006
C	22	(Netherlands)	Visser, Jonas	2.08 m (6 ft 10 in)	25 – 6 February 2001
PF	23	(Netherlands)	Van Wayenburg, Eise	2.05 m (6 ft 9 in)	19 – 16 February 2007
C	34	(Slovenia)	Prepelič, Bine	2.00 m (6 ft 7 in)	25 – 5 August 2001
F	35	(United States)	Cleveland, Carl	1.98 m (6 ft 6 in)	25 – 17 September 2001

Head coach

- (Belgium) Kristof Michiels

Assistant coach(es)

- (Belgium) Christoff Janssens
- (Belgium) Eline Dubin

Legend

- (C) Team captain
- (FA) Free agent
- Injured

- Roster
Updated: September 22, 2026

=== Notable players ===
Note: Flags indicate national team eligibility at FIBA-sanctioned events. Players may hold other non-FIBA nationalities not displayed.

Criteria

To appear in this section a player must have either:

- Set a club record or won an individual award while at the club
- Played at least one official international match for their national team at any time
- Played at least one official NBA match at any time.

- (Belgium) Ismaël Bako
- (Belgium) D. J. Mbenga
- (Belgium) Hans Vanwijn
- (Austria) (Kosovo) Enis Murati
- (Philippines) Stanley Pringle
- (Senegal) Ibrahima Fall Faye
- (Switzerland) Jonathan Dubas
- (United States) Tu Holloway
- (United States) John Tofi
- (United States) Hugh Robertson
- (United States) Ryan Kriener

== List of head coaches ==
Period	Coach
2005–2007	(Netherlands) Peter van Noord
2008–2010	(Croatia) Ivica Skelin
2016–2018	(Belgium) Ferried Naciri
2018–2024	(Belgium) Eddy Casteels
2024–present	(Belgium) Kristof Michiels
