= Sergio De Randamie =

Surinamese basketball player

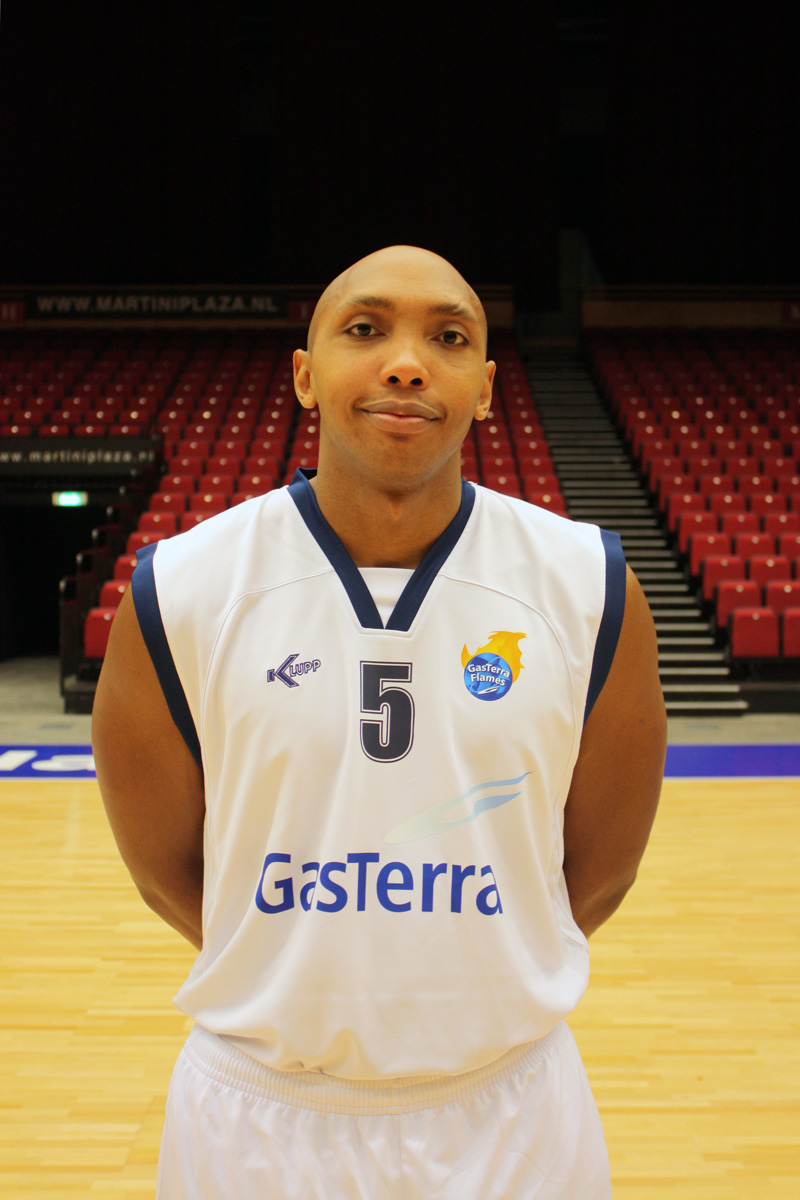
- De Randamie with GasTerra Flames in 2011

Personal information
- Born: 5 July 1984 (age 42) Paramaribo, Suriname
- Listed height: 2.01 m (6 ft 7 in)
- Listed weight: 109 kg (240 lb)

Career information
- College: Midland College (2002–2004); Houston (2004–2006)
- NBA draft: 2006: undrafted
- Playing career: 2007–2022
- Position: Power forward

Career history
- 2007–2011: ABC Amsterdam
- 2011–2013: Donar
- 2013–2014: Landstede Zwolle
- 2014: Den Helder Kings
- 2014–2015: Apollo Amsterdam
- 2015–2016: Rotterdam
- 2016–2017: Apollo Amsterdam
- 2017–2020: ZZ Leiden
- 2020–2022: Apollo Amsterdam

Career highlights
- 2× DBL champion (2008, 2009); 2× DBL All-Star (2011, 2012); DBL Sixth Man of the Year (2019)

Sergio De Randamie (born 5 July 1984) is a Surinamese former basketball player. He played the power forward or center position.

Born in Paramaribo, De Randamie played college basketball in the United States with the Houston Cougars before starting his professional career. He played 14 seasons in the Netherlands; the most with ABC and Apollo Amsterdam where he spent nine seasons. He won two national championships, in 2008 and 2009.

He played for the Suriname national basketball team on occasion.

== Career ==
De Randamie played high school basketball for Midland CC and later college basketball for the Houston Cougars from 2004 until 2006. De Randamie started his professional career in the Netherlands with ABC Amsterdam in the Dutch Basketball League. De Randamie played four years for the team, first as a back-up but later as a starter. In 2011, De Randamie left for GasTerra Flames in Groningen along with his Amsterdam coach Hakim Salem. De Randamie played two years for Groningen. At June 11, 2013 he signed a contract with Landstede Basketbal from Zwolle.

For the 2014–15 season De Randamie signed with Port of Den Helder Kings. In December 2014, Den Helder went bankrupt and De Randamie left for BC Apollo.

De Randamie signed with ZZ Leiden for the 2017–18 season. In the 2018–19 season, De Randamie came off the bench of Leiden. In April 2019, he won the DBL Sixth Man of the Year award.

On 8 July 2020, De Randamie signed with Apollo Amsterdam for his third stint with the team. On 16 August 2021, he extended his contract until 2022. He retired at the end of the 2021–22 season, at age 38.

== International career ==
De Randamie represented Suriname at the 2015 FIBA CBC Championship in the British Virgin Islands.

== Honours ==
Amsterdam

- 2× Dutch Basketball League: 2007–08, 2008–09

Individual awards

- 2× DBL All-Star: 2011, 2012
- DBL Sixth Man of the Year: 2018–19
