= Roger Moute a Bidias =

Cameroonian basketball player

No. 25 – Olympique Antibes
- Position: Small forward
- League: LNB Pro B

Personal information
- Born: 22 April 1995 (age 31) Yaoundé, Cameroon
- Listed height: 1.98 m (6 ft 6 in)
- Listed weight: 93 kg (205 lb)

Career information
- High school: Notre Dame Preparatory (Fitchburg, Massachusetts)
- College: California (2013–2017)
- NBA draft: 2017: undrafted
- Playing career: 2018–present

Career history
- 2018–2019: Raptors 905
- 2019: Rio Grande Valley Vipers
- 2020: Santa Cruz Warriors
- 2021–2022: Apollo Amsterdam
- 2022–present: Olympique Antibes

Roger Duclos Moute a Bidias (born 22 April 1995) is a Cameroonian basketball player for Olympique Antibes of the LNB Pro B. Standing at 1.98 m (6 ft 6 in), he mainly plays as small forward. Moute a Bidias also plays for the Cameroon national team.

== Early life ==
Born in Yaoundé, Moute a Bidias played basketball for the first time when he was a high school freshman.

== College career ==
Moute a Bidias played four seasons for the California Golden Bears. He was described as a defensive specialist of the team. Throughout his career, he frequently received advice from NBA-player Luc Mbah a Moute.

== Professional career ==
Moute a Bidias was signed by the Raptors 905 of the NBA G League after playing in an open try-out. However, he was injured during training camp and was released. In February, he was added to the Raptors roster again. He appeared in four games in the 2017–18 NBA G League season.

The following season, he played for the Rio Grande Valley Vipers.

On 17 January 2020, the Santa Cruz Warriors acquired Moute a Bidias.

On 22 October 2021, Moute a Bidias signed with Apollo Amsterdam of the BNXT League.

On 13 April 2022, Moute a Bidias signed with the Edmonton Stingers of the CEBL.

== National team career ==
Moute a Bidias made his debut for the Cameroon national basketball team in 2022 in the 2023 FIBA Basketball World Cup qualifiers.
