= DBC Houthalen =

- Leagues: Belgian Women's Basketball League
- Founded: 2002; 23 years ago
- Arena: Sportpark Lakerveld
- Location: Houthalen, Belgium
- Website: dbchouthalen.be

Dames Basketball Club Houthalen, or simply Houthalen, is a Belgian women's basketball club based in Houthalen. It plays in the Belgian Women's Basketball League and was established in 2002 after it separated from BC2000 Houthalen.
