= Belgian Women's Basketball League =

- Sport: Basketball
- Founded: 1934
- First season: 1934-35
- No. of teams: 12
- Country: Belgium
- Continent: FIBA Europe (Europe)
- Most titles: BC Namur-Capitale (17)
- Level on pyramid: 1
- Website: https://www.basketfeminin.com/

The Belgian Jupiler Women's Basketball League (French Championnat de Belgique de basketball féminin) is Belgium's basketball tournament among women's teams. The first tournament took place in 1934, won by Schaerbeek. BC Namur-Capitale from Saint-Servais is the biggest overall champion, with 17 titles.

== Current season teams (2018–19) ==
- BC Namur-Capitale (Namur)
- Declercq Stortbeton Waregem BC (Waregem)
- Kangoeroes Willebroek (Boom)
- Mithra Castors Braine (Braine-l'Alleud)
- DB Tulikivi Deerlijk (Deerlijk)
- Royal Spirou Monceau (Monceau-sur-Sambre)
- DBC Houthalen (Houthalen)
- BBC Gentson (Ghent)
- KB Oostende-Bredene (Ostend)
- Basket Groot Willebroek (Willebroek)
- Liège Panthers (Liège)

== List of champions ==
- 1935 : CAF Schaerbeek
- 1936 : Fémina Liège
- 1937 : Fémina Liège
- 1938 : Fémina Liège
- 1939 : Fémina Liège
- 1942 : Fémina Liège
- 1946 : Atalante Bruxelles
- 1947 : Atalante Bruxelles
- 1948 : Etoile BC Gent
- 1949 : Atalante Bruxelles
- 1950 : US Anderlecht
- 1951 : Atalante Bruxelles
- 1952 : Atalante Bruxelles
- 1953 : Atalante Bruxelles
- 1954 : Antwerpse BC
- 1955 : Antwerpse BC
- 1956 : Antwerpse BC
- 1957 : Antwerpse BC
- 1958 : Antwerpse BC
- 1959 : Antwerpse BC
- 1960 : Antwerpse BC
- 1961 : Standard de Liège Basket
- 1962 : Standard de Liège Basket
- 1963 : Standard de Liège Basket
- 1964 : Standard de Liège Basket
- 1965 : Etoile Destelbergen
- 1966 : Royal White Woluwe
- 1967 : Standard de Liège Basket
- 1968 : Standard de Liège Basket
- 1969 : Hellas BC
- 1970 : Etoile Destelbergen
- 1971 : BC Le Logis
- 1972 : BC Le Logis
- 1973 : SIM Aalst
- 1974 : Hellas BC
- 1975 : BC Le Logis
- 1976 : Amicale Merelbeke
- 1977 : DBC Aalst
- 1978 : Amicale Merelbeke
- 1979 : Stars Destelbergen
- 1980 : BC Koksijde
- 1981 : BC Koksijde
- 1982 : BC Koksijde
- 1983 : BC Koksijde
- 1984 : BC Koksijde
- 1985 : Charles Quint Bruxelles
- 1986 : Charles Quint Bruxelles
- 1987 : Charles Quint Bruxelles
- 1988 : Charles Quint Bruxelles
- 1989 : Monceau Féminin
- 1990 : Mini Flat Waregem
- 1991 : BCSS Namur
- 1992 : BCSS Namur
- 1993 : BCSS Namur
- 1994 : BCSS Namur
- 1995 : Soubry Kortrijk
- 1996 : Soubry Kortrijk
- 1997 : BCSS Namur
- 1998 : BCSS Namur
- 1999 : BCSS Namur
- 2000 : BCSS Namur
- 2001 : BCSS Namur
- 2002 : BCSS Namur
- 2003 : Dexia Namur
- 2004 : Dexia Namur
- 2005 : Dexia Namur
- 2006 : Dexia Namur
- 2007 : Dexia Namur
- 2008 : IMC Dames Waregem
- 2009 : Dexia Namur
- 2010 : BBC Sint-Katelijne-Waver
- 2011 : IMC Dames Waregem
- 2012 : Blue Cats Ieper
- 2013 : BC Namur-Capitale
- 2014 : Castors Braine
- 2015 : Castors Braine
- 2016 : Castors Braine
- 2017 : Castors Braine
- 2018 : Castors Braine
- 2019 : Castors Braine
- 2020 : Castors Braine
- 2021 : BC Namur-Capitale
- 2022 : Kangoeroes Mechelen
- 2023 : Kangoeroes Mechelen
- 2024 : Kangoeroes Mechelen
- 2025 : Castors Braine
