= Apollo Amsterdam =

- Leagues: Promotiedivisie
- Founded: 2011; 15 years ago
- History: BC Apollo; 2011–2015; Apollo Amsterdam; 2015–present
- Arena: Apollohal
- Capacity: 1,500
- Location: Amsterdam, Netherlands
- Main sponsor: Paul Meijering
- President: Mark van Meggelen
- Head coach: Wierd Goedee
- Championships: 1 Promotiedivisie
- Website: www.apollobasketball.nl
Home	Away

Apollo Amsterdam is a Dutch basketball team in Amsterdam. The club plays its games in the Promotiedivisie, the Dutch second-level league.

The club was founded in 2011 and has played in the highest national level for 14 years, from 2012 to 2023. They qualified for the national playoffs four times. The amateur section of the club is known as BC Apollo.

Apollo Amsterdam is known for their focus on developing the Dutch basketball players and giving them growth perspective in a foreign player dominated league.

== History ==
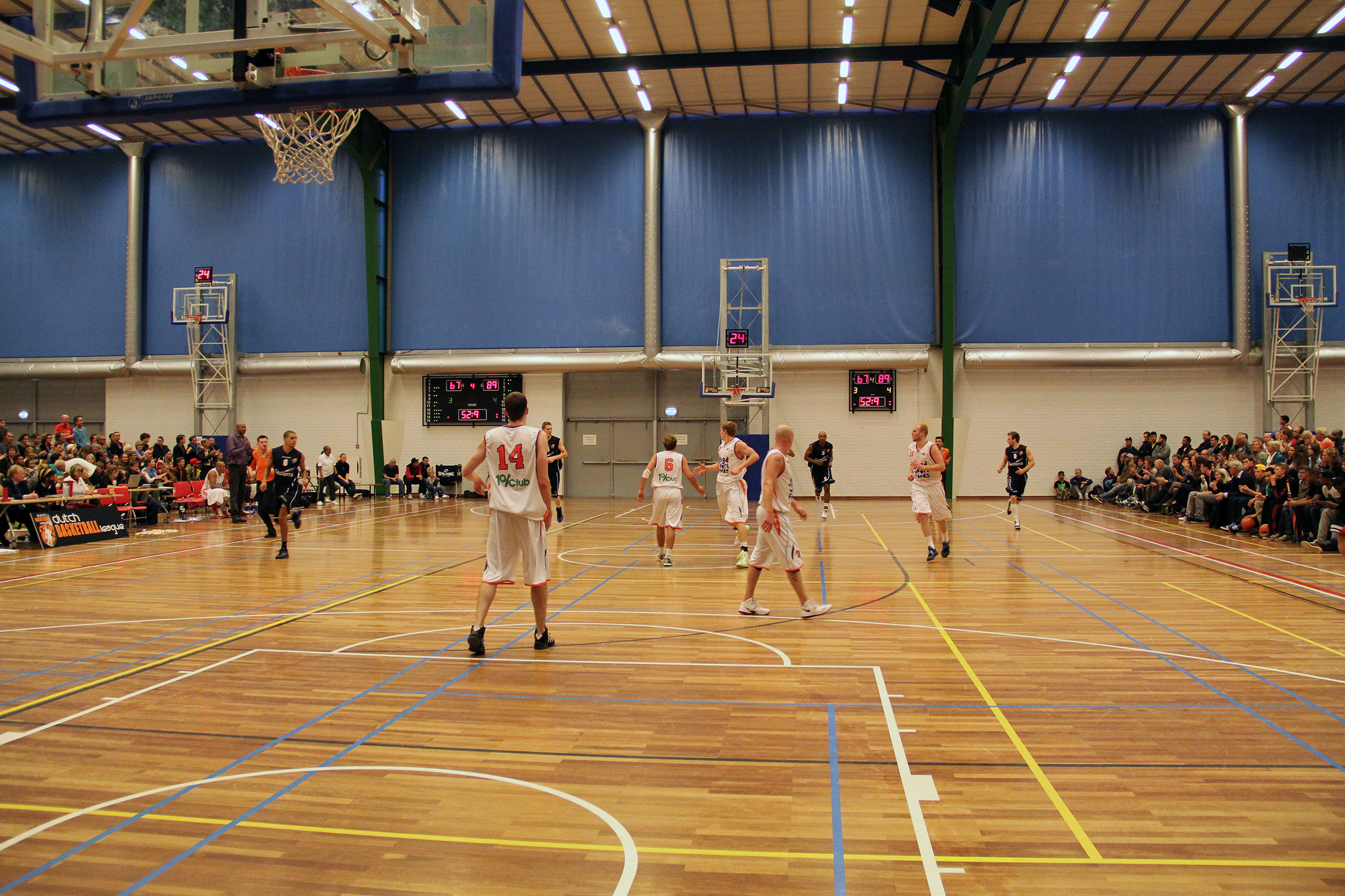
Apollo playing its first home game ever in the Dutch Basketball League in October 2012

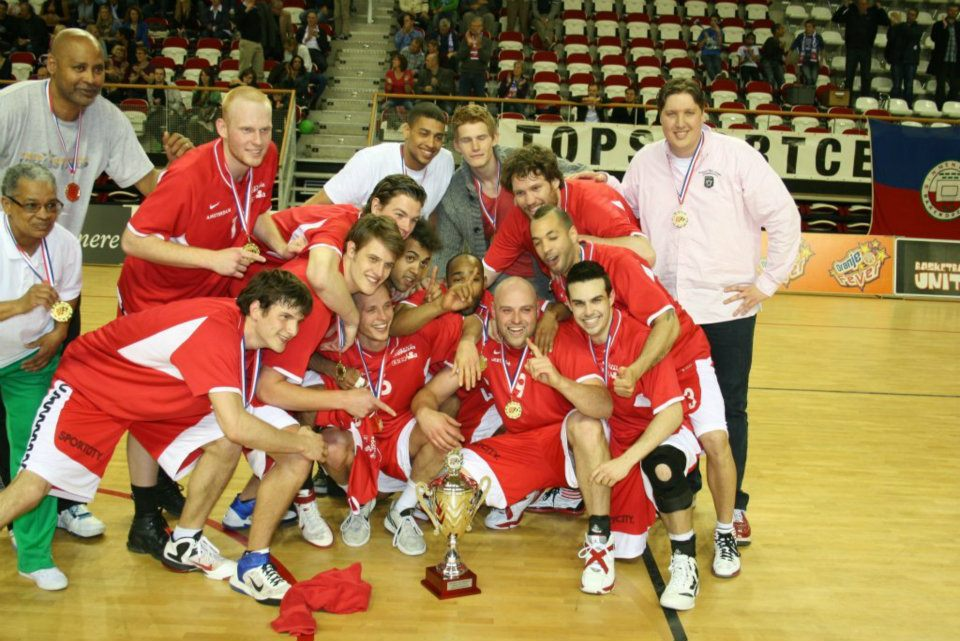
Apollo celebrating after winning the Promotiedivisie in 2012

The club was founded in 2011, as a result of a merger between BV Lely and Mosquitos, both clubs from Amsterdam. Its name is derived from its home venue the Apollohal. Apollo took over the license of the old ABC Amsterdam second team. In the first season of the club, Apollo played as an amateur team in the Promotiedivisie. They immediately won the Dutch amateur championship after defeating CBV Binnenland in the league final.

In 2012, Apollo club decided to enter the professional Dutch Basketball League (DBL) for the 2012–13 season. In its first season, led by coach Tyrone Marioneaux and All-Star Aron Royé, Apollo finished in ninth place in the DBL.

In 2013–14, Apollo managed to reach the playoffs for the first time in franchise history. The club lost in the quarterfinals to GasTerra Flames, 0–2.

During Apollo's most successful season since their establishment, the club had financial problems which made it close to withdrawing from the DBL. However, in August 2014 it was announced Apollo would continue playing in the DBL.

In the 2015–16 season, Apollo made its second appearance in the DBL playoffs where it lost to Den Bosch 0–2 in the quarterfinals.

Apollo won its first playoff game in 2016, defeating ZZ Leiden in Game 1 of the quarterfinals. However, in a packed Apollohal, Leiden retrieved home advantage and went on to beat Apollo 1–2 and advance to the semifinals.

On 1 May 2020, Apollo announced it would not play in the 2020–21 DBL season because of uncertainty caused by the COVID-19 pandemic. Apollo also announced Laki Lakner was replacing Patrick Faijdherbe as head coach. Lakner resigned after three games, and Edwin van der Hart took over for the remainder of the season. Apollo finished in ninth place for a second season in a row.

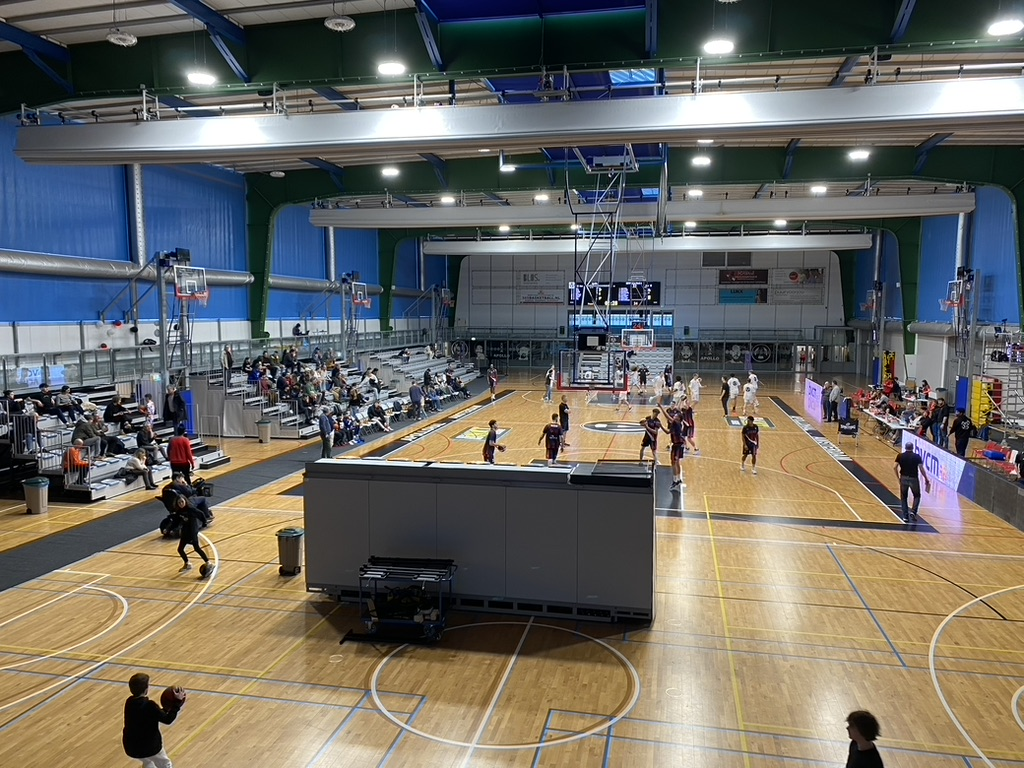
The Apollohal during a game in 2023

Since the 2021–22 season, Apollo plays in the BNXT League, in which the national leagues of Belgium and the Netherlands have been merged. In June 2021, Wierd Goedee was signed as new head coach.

In June 2023, following the 2022–23 season, Apollo was forced to withdraw from the BNXT League as it was unable to come up with the necessary budget for participation. The BNXT organisation required a minimum budget of €350,000 which Apollo was unable to bring together with its sponsorships. Apollo entered the second-level Promotiedivisie for the 2023–24 season.

== Honours ==
- Promotiedivisie

Winners (1): 2011–12

Runners-up (1): 2025–26

== Players ==
=== Individual awards ===
DBL All-Defense Team

- Berend Weijs – 2019

DBL Rookie of the Year

- Berend Weijs – 2013

DBL blocks leader

- Berend Weijs – 2013, 2014, 2018, 2019

DBL All-Rookie Team

- Lucas Steijn – 2014

=== Notable players ===
Note: Flags indicate national team eligibility at FIBA-sanctioned events. Players may hold other non-FIBA nationalities not displayed.

Criteria

To appear in this section a player must have either:

- Set a club record or won an individual award while at the club
- Played at least one official international match for their national team at any time
- Played at least one official NBA match at any time.

- (Netherlands) Aron Royé (5 seasons: 2012–14; 2014–17; 2018–19)
- (Netherlands) Dimeo van der Horst (5 seasons: 2014–19)
- (Netherlands) Berend Weijs (2014–15; 2016–17; 2020–present)
- (Suriname) Sergio De Randamie (2014–2015; 2016–2017; 2020–present)
- (Syria) Michael Madanly (1 season: 2017)
- (Netherlands) Malevy Leons (2 seasons: 2017–19)
- (Netherlands) Shaquille Doorson (1 season: 2012–13)
- (Netherlands) Jesse Edwards (youth teams only)
- (Netherlands) Quinten Post (youth teams only)
- (Netherlands) Tristan Enaruna (1 season: 2017–18)

=== NCAA Division 1 players from academy ===
The youth academy of Apollo Amsterdam has developed the following players who have played in the NCAA Division I. Players in bold have played minutes for the senior team in the Dutch Basketball League or BNXT League.

Player	Committed to	First year
**Shaquille Doorson**	Rutgers	2014
Jesse Edwards	Syracause	2019
Kai Edwards	Northern Colorado	2016
**Iyen Enaruna**	Evansville	2020
**Tristan Enaruna**	Kansas	2019
**Malevy Leons**	Bradley	2021
**Siem Uijtendaal**	Canisius	2020

=== Top scorers by seasons ===
Season	Name	PPG
2012–13	(Netherlands) Aron Royé	16.3
2013–14	(Netherlands) Aron Royé	13.2
2014–15	(Netherlands) Dimeo van der Horst	12.8
2015–16	(Netherlands) Aron Royé	15.6
2016–17	(Netherlands) Dimeo van der Horst	16.0

Season	Name	PPG
2017–18	(Syria) Micheal Madanly	16.1
2018–19	(Netherlands) Dimeo van der Horst	15.6
2019–20	(United States) Xavier Cannefax	21.9
2020–21	(Netherlands) Berend Weijs	13.5
2021–22	(Cameroon) Roger Moute a Bidias	15.9

=== Individual awards ===
DBL Top Scorer

- Xavier Cannefax – 2020

DBL Rookie of the Year

- Berend Weijs – 2013

DBL All-Rookie Team

- Lucas Steijn – 2014

== Season by season ==
Season	Tier	League	Pos.	NBB Cup
Apollo Amsterdam
2011-12	2	Promotiedivisie	Champions	
2012–13	1	DBL	9th	Eightfinals
2013–14	1	DBL	8th	Eightfinals
2014–15	1	DBL	7th	Eightfinals
2015–16	1	DBL	5th	Quarterfinals
2016–17	1	DBL	5th	Semifinals
2017–18	1	DBL	7th	Eightfinals
2018–19	1	DBL	6th	Quarterfinals
2019–20	1	DBL	9th (Note: The 2019–20 season was cancelled in March because of the COVID-19 pandemic.)	Quarterfinals
2020–21	1	DBL	9th	First round
2021–22	1	BNXT League	NL 9th	Eightfinals
2021–22	1	BNXT League	BNXT 19th	Eightfinals
2022–23	1	BNXT League	NL 10th	Eightfinals
2022–23	1	BNXT League	BNXT 20th	Eightfinals
2023-24	2	Promotiedivisie	6th	
2024-25	2	Promotiedivisie	3rd	
2025-26	2	Promotiedivisie	Runner-up	
2026–27	2	Promotiedivisie		Second round

== List of head coaches ==
The following is a list of all the head coaches of Apollo since its establishment in 2011:

Period	Coach
2011–2013	(Netherlands) Tyrone Marioneaux
2013–2014	(Netherlands) Hakim Salem
2014–2015	(Estonia) Jaanus Liivak
2015–2020	(Netherlands) Patrick Faijdherbe
2020–2021	(Croatia) Laki Lakner
2021	(Netherlands) Edwin van der Hart
2021–present	(Netherlands) Wierd Goedee
