= DBL Rookie of the Year =

Yearly basketball awards in Netherlands

The Dutch Basketball League Rookie of the Year is an award that is yearly given to the best first-year player in the DBL, the highest professional basketball league in the Netherlands. The award is handed out after the regular season. The award is handed out by the FEB (Federatie Eredivisie Basketbal). Only Dutch players can win the award.

== Winners ==
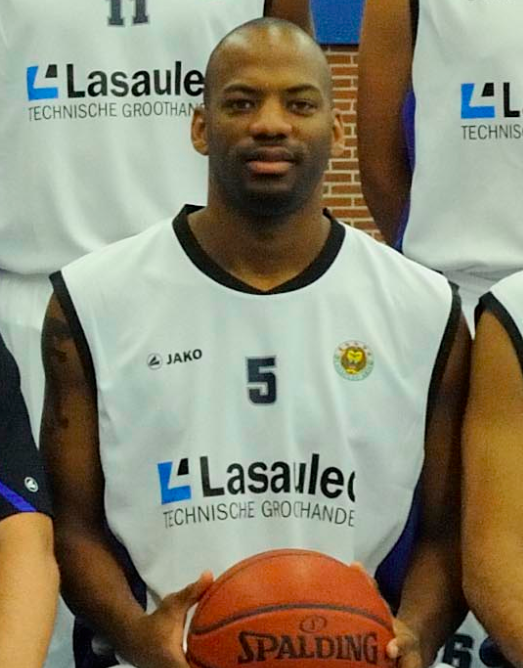
Tjoe de Paula won the award in 2002

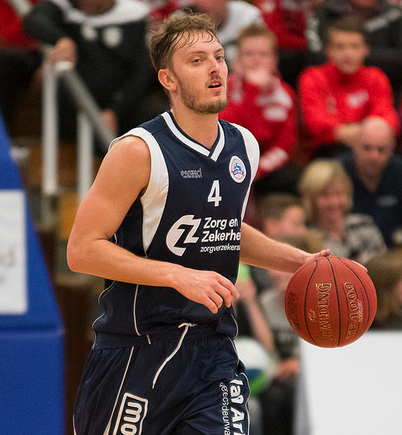
Rogier Jansen was Rookie of the Year in 2004

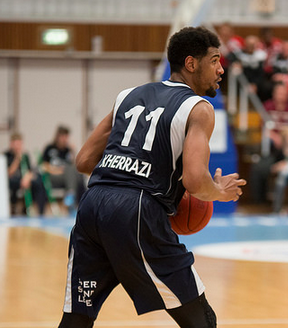
Mohamed Kherrazi was Rookie of the Year in 2010

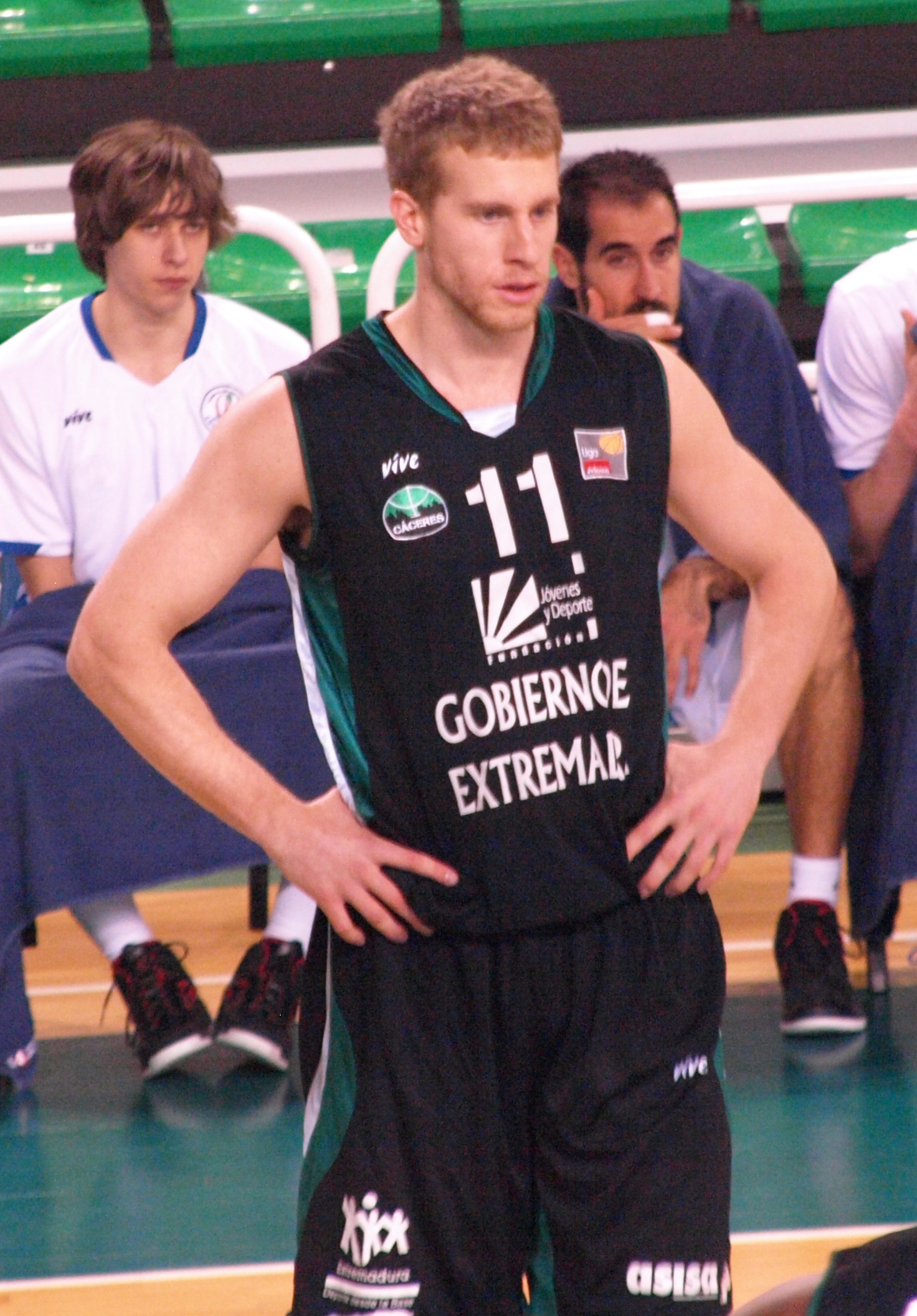
Joshua Duinker, award winner in the 2013–14 season

Key
Player (X)	Name of the player and number of times they had won the award at that point (if more than one)
Club (X)	Name of the club and the number of times a player of it has won the award (if more than one)
Nationality	Flags indicate national team eligibility at FIBA sanctioned events. Players may hold other non-FIBA nationality not displayed.
^	Denotes player who is still active in the DBL

Season	Player	Position	Nationality	Team	Ref.
1974–75	René Vervoorn		Netherlands	Rotterdam-Zuid	
1975–76	Cock van de Lagemaat		Netherlands	Buitoni Haarlem	
1976–77	Jos Wolfs		Netherlands	Buitoni Haarlem (2)	
1977–78	Eric van Solm		Netherlands	Rotterdam-Zuid (2)	
1978–79	René Ridderhof		Netherlands	Frisol Rowic Dordrecht	
1979–80	Jelle Esveldt		Netherlands	Rotterdam-Zuid (3)	
1980–81	Michael de Jager		Netherlands	Eve & Adam Stars Haarlem	
1981–82	Jos Kuipers		Netherlands	Nashua Den Bosch	
1982–83	Kees Zoutman		Netherlands	ONRO Rotterdam-Zuid (4)	
1983–84	Guus Schuyt		Netherlands	Canadians Amsterdam	
1984–85	Okke te Velde		Netherlands	Canadians Amsterdam (2)	
1985–86	Jos Bams		Netherlands	Kaypro Weert	
1986–87	Paul Santen		Netherlands	ICL Zaandam	
1988–89	Marcel Huijbens		Netherlands	Orca's Urk	
1989–90	Gerard Ackermans		Netherlands	Expand Eindhoven	
1990–91	Jeroen van Veen		Netherlands	DAS Delft	
1991–92	Virgil Ormskerk		Netherlands	De Schietstreek Rotterdam	
1992–93	Eric van der Sluis		Netherlands	Commodore Den Helder	
1993–94	Brian Benjamin		Netherlands	BV Haarlem	
1994–95	Peter van Rij		Netherlands	De Schietstreek Rotterdam (2)	
1995–96	Patrick Faijdherbe	Guard	Netherlands	Celeritas/Donar Groningen	
1996–97	Harvey van Stein	Forward	Netherlands	Akrides	
1997–98	Raoul Heinen	Forward	Netherlands	Ricoh Astronauts Amsterdam	
1998–99	Roberto van den Broek	Forward	Netherlands	RZG Donar	
1999–00	Ron Borstel	Guard	Netherlands	Canoe Jeans Den Bosch	
2000–01	Sydmill Harris	Forward	Netherlands	Ricoh Astronauts Amsterdam (2)	
2001–02	Tjoe de Paula^	Forward	Dominican Republic (Note: De Paula also owns the Dutch nationality.)	BC Noordkop Den Helder (2)	
2002–03	Kees Akerboom Jr.^	Forward	Netherlands	EBBC Den Bosch	
2003–04	Rogier Jansen	Guard	Netherlands	MPC Capitals	
2004–05	Terry Sas	Guard	Netherlands	BC Omniworld Almere	
2006–07	Calvin Smith	Forward	Netherlands	Polynorm Giants	
2007–08	Jeroen Slor	Forward	Netherlands	Rotterdam Challengers	
2008–09	Joey Schelvis	Guard	Netherlands	ZZ Leiden	
2009–10	Mohamed Kherrazi^	Forward	Netherlands (Note: Mohamed Kherrazi, born in Errachidia, also owns the Moroccan nationality.)	ABC Amsterdam (3)	
2010–11	Craig Osaikhwuwuomwan^	Center	Netherlands	ABC Amsterdam (4)	
2011–12	Valentijn Lietmeijer	Guard	Netherlands	Lasaulec Aris	
2012–13	Berend Weijs^	Center	Netherlands	Apollo Amsterdam	
2013–14	Joshua Duinker	Forward/center	Netherlands (Note: Joshua Duinker, born in Sydney, also owns the Australian nationality.)	ZZ Leiden	
2014–15	Daan Rosenmuller	Guard	Netherlands	BSW	
2015–16	Freek Vos	Center	Netherlands	Landstede Zwolle	
2016–17	Olaf Schaftenaar	Forward	Netherlands	Landstede Zwolle	
2017–18	Boyd van der Vuurst de Vries^	Guard	Netherlands	Den Helder Suns	
2018–19	Boy van Vliet^	Guard	Netherlands	Den Helder Suns	
2020–21	Emmanuel Nzekwesi^	Center	Netherlands	ZZ Leiden	
