= José Dimitri Maconda =

Dutch-Angolan basketball player

Free Agent
- Position: Point guard / shooting guard

Personal information
- Born: November 28, 2001 (age 24) Rotterdam, Netherlands
- Listed height: 1.88 m (6 ft 2 in)

Career information
- Playing career: 2020–present

Career history
- 2020–2021: Óbila CB
- 2021: Heroes Den Bosch
- 2021–2022: Aris Leeuwarden
- 2022–2023: Iraurgi SB
- 2022–2023: Sangalhos DC
- 2023–2024: LWD Basket
- 2024–2026: ZZ Leiden

José Dimitri Maconda (born 28 November 2001) is a Dutch-Angolan basketball player who last played for ZZ Leiden of the BNXT League. Standing at 188 cm (6 ft 2 in), Maconda plays as point guard. He also plays for the Angola national team.

== Early career ==
Born in Rotterdam to Angolan parents, Maconda initially played football before picking up basketball at age 10. He played for the junior teams of Rotterdam-Zuid, CBV Binnenland and BAL. Maconda then played for the Orange Lions Academy under coach Marco van den Berg.

== Professional career ==
Maconda signed his first professional contract at age 17, with Óbila CB of the Liga EBA, the Spanish fourth level.

On 21 January 2021, he signed with Heroes Den Bosch of the Dutch Basketball League (DBL) for the remainder of the season.

On 17 June 2021, Maconda signed a one-year contract with Aris Leeuwarden. He was nominated for the BNXT League Rising Star of the Year award.

On 21 July 2022, he signed for Iraurgi SB (for sponsorship reasons named Juaristi ISB) of the LEB Oro.

In June 2023, Maconda returned to Aris Leeuwarden, who by then had changed their name to LWD Basket, for a second stint.

On 20 June 2024, Maconda signed a three-year contract for ZZ Leiden.

== National team career ==
Maconda played in the Netherlands under-16 and under-18 teams and played in the European Championships for these age categories.

In August 2022, Maconda was selected for the Angola senior team. On 26 August, he made his debut when he scored 11 points in a 84–62 win over Uganda during the 2023 FIBA Basketball World Cup qualification.
