= Wierd Goedee =

Dutch basketball coach

Apollo Amsterdam
- Title: Head coach
- League: Dutch Basketball League

Personal information
- Born: 14 August 1967 (age 59)
- Listed height: 1.92 m (6 ft 4 in)

Career information
- Playing career: 1987–2001
- Position: Guard
- Coaching career: ?–present

Career history

Playing
- 1987–1992: BC Eindhoven
- 1992–1993: Canadians
- 1993–1999: EBBC Den Bosch
- 1999–2000: Virtus Werkendam
- 2000–2001: NAC

Coaching
- ?: BSW
- 2006–2010: Den Bosch (assistant)
- 2010–2011: West-Brabant Giants
- 2021–2024: Apollo Amsterdam
- 2024-present: Hot Pepper Heat

Career highlights
- As player: 2× DBL champion (1996, 1997); 2× DBL All-Star (1990, 1991); As assistant coach: 2× DBL champion (2006, 2007)

Wierd Goedee (born 14 August 1967) is a Dutch basketball coach and former player. He is the current head coach of Apollo Amsterdam, since signing in 2021. He played 33 games for the Netherlands national basketball team.

== Playing career ==
Goedee started his career with BC Eindhoven, which he helped promote to the top level Eredivisie. He then played with Canadians Amsterdam in the 1992–93 season. In 1993, he signed with EBBC Den Bosch, where he stayed for six seasons. In the following years, he played with Virtus Werkendam and NAC Basketbal. He averaged 10.1 points over his Eredivisie career.

== Coaching career ==
Goedee was the head coach of Eredivisie club BSW Weert. In 2010, Goedee became the head coach of West-Brabant Giants. He reached the final of the 2010–11 NBB Cup with Giants. The Giants were dissolved after the season due to the bankruptcy of the club.

On 25 June 2021, Goedee signed a 2-year contract to become the new head coach of Apollo Amsterdam.
