= Hakim Salem =

Egyptian-Dutch basketball coach (born 1977)

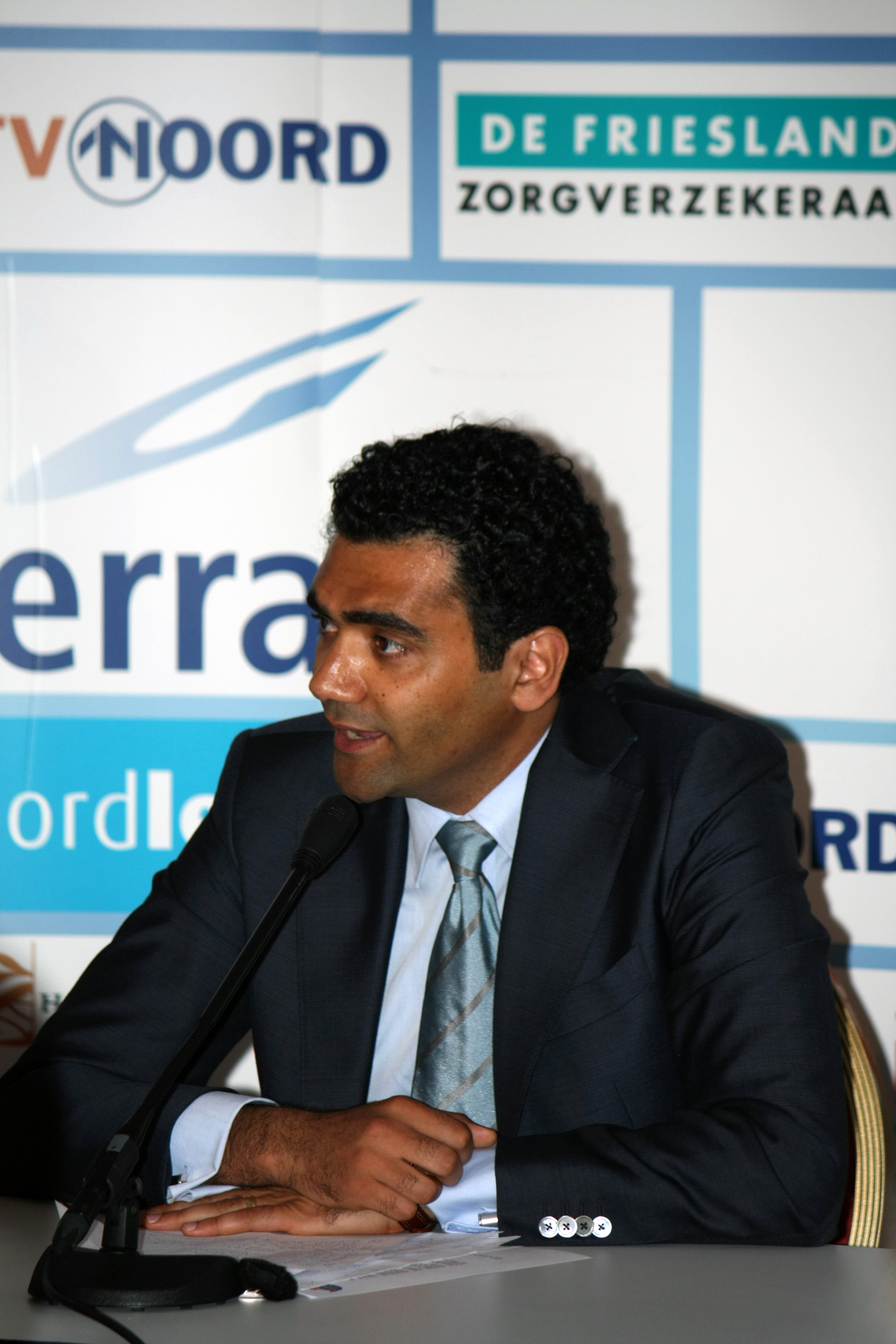
- Salem in 2011

Personal information
- Born: 30 November 1977 (age 48) Giza, Netherlands
- Position: Head coach
- Coaching career: 2010–present

Career history

Coaching
- 2010–2011: ABC Amsterdam
- 2011–2012: Donar
- 2013–2014: Apollo Amsterdam
- 2016–2017: Lecdetec.nl Bemmel
- 2015–2017: Netherlands women national team (assistant)
- 2016–2021: Netherlands women national 3x3 team
- 2017–2021: Netherlands women national team
- 2021–2023: Nyon Basket Fèminin

Hakim Salem (born 30 November 1977) is an Egyptian-born Dutch basketball coach. He was the head coach of Nyon Basket Feminin from 2021 to 2023. He was the coach of the Netherlands women's national basketball team from 2017 to 2021.

== Early life ==
Born in Giza, Salem moved to the Netherlands when he was 14 years old. He played basketball with Landslake Lions and Canadians in Amsterdam. He started his coaching career at BV Lely, where he coached several teams over 8 years. In 2009, Salem started coaching for ABC Amsterdam.

== Coaching career ==
In 2010, Salem made his debut at the highest level when he coached the ABC Amsterdam team in the Dutch Basketball League. He managed to lead the team to the playoffs. In October 2011, Salem was presented as the new coach of Donar, then named GasTerra Flames for sponsorship reasons. He signed a two-year contract, however, he was fired in December 2012 due to disappointing results.

On 5 August 2011, Salem signed as head coach of Apollo Amsterdam, a newly found club which replaced ABC Amsterdam at the highest level. In the summer of 2015, Salem was an assistant coach for the Netherlands women's team.

In January 2017, Salem was assigned as the new head coach of the Netherlands national women's team.
