= Berend Weijs =

Dutch basketball player

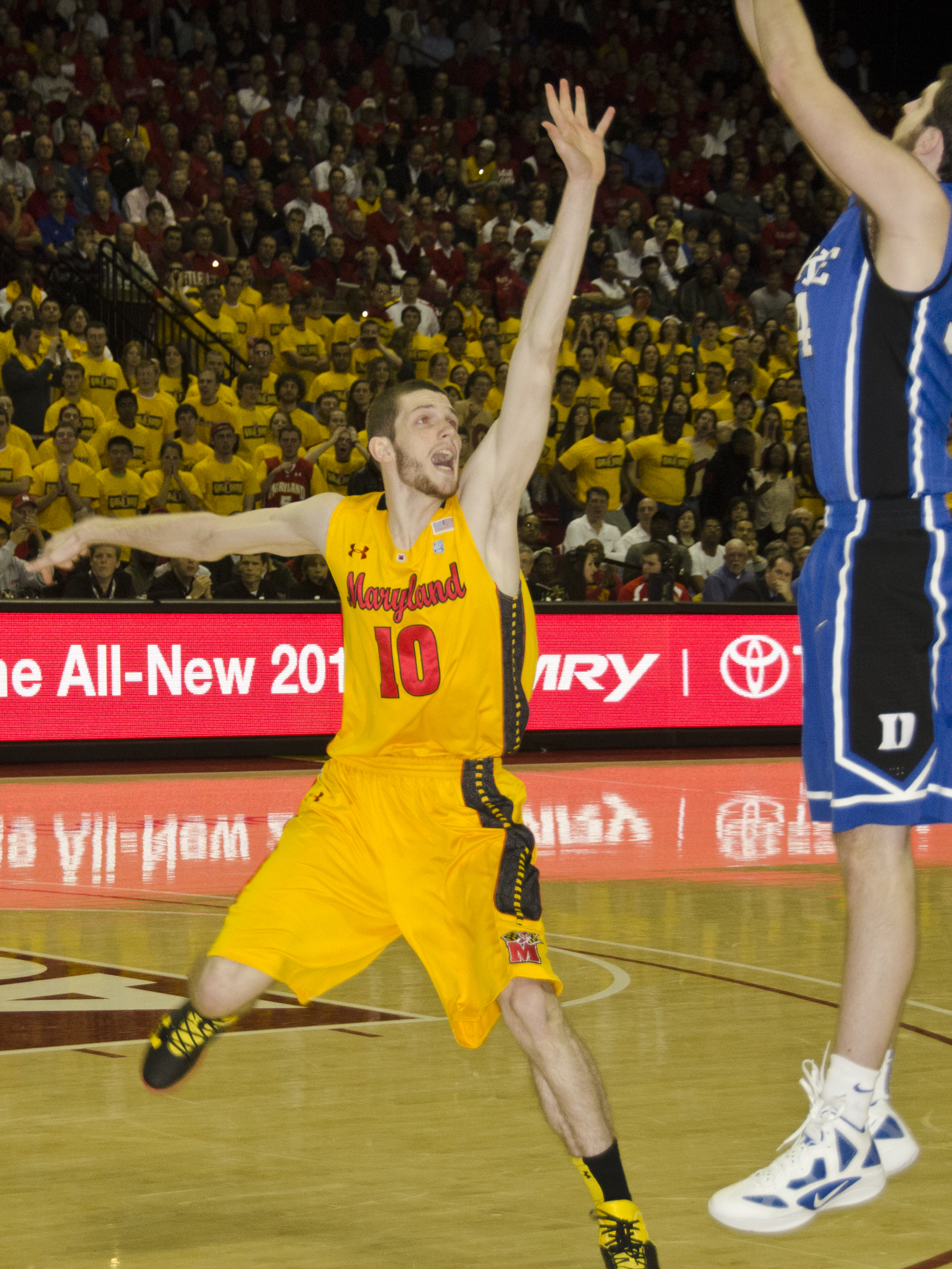
- Weijs playing with Maryland in 2012

Personal information
- Born: 15 December 1988 (age 37) Zaandam, Netherlands
- Listed height: 6 ft 10 in (2.08 m)
- Listed weight: 205 lb (93 kg)

Career information
- College: Harcum (2008–2010); Maryland (2010–2012)
- NBA draft: 2012: undrafted
- Playing career: 2012–present
- Position: Power forward / center

Career history
- 2012–2014: Apollo Amsterdam
- 2014–2017: Landslake Lions
- 2017–2020: Apollo Amsterdam
- 2021–2022: Apollo Amsterdam

Career highlights
- DBL Rookie of the Year (2013); DBL All-Defense Team (2019); 4× DBL blocks leader (2013, 2014, 2018, 2019); Dutch Second League champion (2017)

Berend Weijs (born 15 December 1988) is a Dutch basketball player who last played for Apollo Amsterdam. Standing at 2.08 m (6 ft 10 in), he plays as center and played college basketball for two seasons for Harcum College and two seasons for Maryland. Since then, he has been active as a professional player in the Netherlands.

== Professional career ==
After his collegiate time, he spent two seasons in the Dutch Basketball League with Apollo Amsterdam. Following, he played three seasons in the Dutch second division for the Landslake Lions. For the 2017–18 season, Weijs returned to Apollo Amsterdam. He averaged 11.0 points and 6.2 rebounds per game on the season and re-signed with the club on July 19, 2018. The 2019–20 season was ended early in March because of the COVID-19 pandemic. The same month, Weijs announced his retirement. He returned to Apollo in January 2021. Weijs left Apollo after the 2021–22 season.
