= Patrick Faijdherbe =

Dutch basketball player and coach

Personal information
- Born: 25 May 1973 (age 53) Amsterdam, Netherlands

Career information
- Playing career: 1994–2013
- Position: Point guard
- Coaching career: 2012–present

Career history

Playing
- 1994–1995: Piranha's Amstelveen
- 1995–1998: Donar
- 1998–2000: Panthers Fürstenfeld
- 2000–2001: EiffelTowers Nijmegen
- 2001–2003: Amsterdam Astronauts
- 2012–2013: Apollo Amsterdam

Coaching
- 2012–2013: Apollo Amsterdam (assistant)
- 2013–2015: Apollo Amsterdam (youth)
- 2015–2020: Apollo Amsterdam

Career highlights
- As player: DBL Rookie of the Year (1995)

Patrick Faijdherbe (born 25 May 1973) is a Dutch former basketball player and current coach. He served as a head coach for Apollo Amsterdam of the Dutch Basketball League (DBL) for five seasons.

== Coaching career ==
In the summer of 2015, Faijdherbe was announced as the new head coach of Apollo Amsterdam of the Dutch Basketball League. After the 2019–20 season, Faijdherbe stopped after 5 seasons with Apollo.
