= Peter van Noord =

Dutch basketball player (born 1963)

Personal information
- Born: 3 February 1963 (age 63) Amstelveen, Netherlands
- Listed height: 2.05 m (6 ft 9 in)

Career information
- College: Fresno State (1984–1985)
- Playing career: 1981–1991
- Position: Power forward / center
- Coaching career: 2004–present

Career history

Playing
- 1981–1982: Amstelveen
- 1982–1983: Flamingo's Haarlem
- 1983–1984: Den Helder
- 1985–1988: Den Helder
- 1989–1991: Red Giants

Coaching
- 2004: Netherlands U18
- 2005: Netherlands U16
- 2005–2007: Leuven Bears
- 2007–2009: Den Helder Seals
- 2012–2014: Netherlands (assistant)
- 2014–2015: Landslake Lions
- 2017–2023: Den Helder Suns
- 2018: Young Netherlands

Career highlights
- As player: DBL All-Star (1987)

Peter van Noord (born 3 February 1963) is a Dutch retired basketball player and current coach.

As a player, Van Noord was a 2.05 m (6 ft 8 1/2 in) power forward. Van Noord was a member of the Netherlands national basketball team and played with them at the 1986 FIBA World Championship and at FIBA EuroBasket in 1985 and 1987. In his professional career, he played for several teams in the Netherlands including Den Helder and Flamingo's Haarlem.

Van Noord started his coaching career in 2004, with the Netherlands Under-18 and later the Under-16 team. In 2005, he coached his first professional team with Leuven Bears in Belgium. Between 2017 and 2023, Van Noord was the head coach of the Den Helder Suns.
