= Apollohal =

Sports hall in Amsterdam, Netherlands

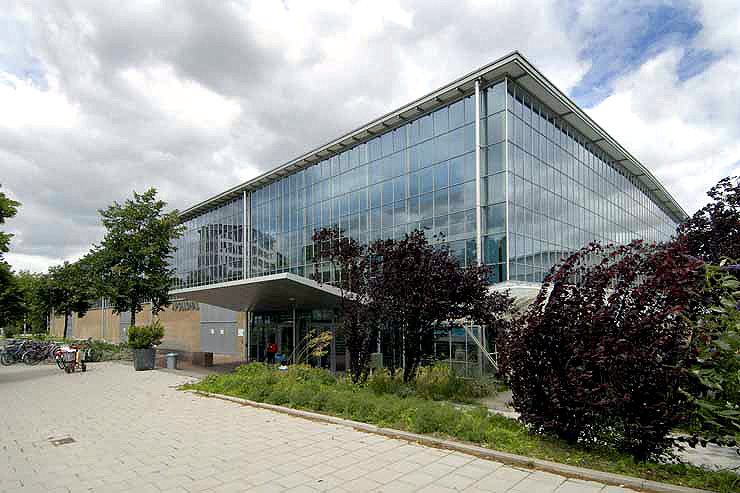
- The Apollohal in 2007
- Interactive map of Apollohal
- Address: Apollolaan 4
- Location: Amsterdam, Netherlands
- Coordinates: 52.348366502994374°N 4.884150697914121°E
- Owner: Municipality-owned
- Operator: Gemeente Amsterdam

Construction
- Built: 1934
- Opened: 1934
- Renovated: 2004
- Architect: Albert Boeken

Tenant
- Apollo Amsterdam (2011–present)

The Apollohal is an indoor sports hall located in Amsterdam, Netherlands. Built in 1934 as a tennis hall, the complex was later designated for expositions and ice skating, although throughout it was also the home base of the Mosquitos basketball club (now Apollo Amsterdam). Since it was renovated in 2004–2005, it has mainly been used as basketball hall. It is the current home arena of Apollo Amsterdam, a professional team that plays in the Dutch Basketball League (DBL). It was also used by the Amsterdam Astronauts when it was the premier basketball team in the city.

Since 2004, the building is a Rijksmonument and is on the Dutch national heritage site list.
