= 2013 DBL Playoffs =

The 2013 DBL Playoffs were the final phase of the 2012–13 Dutch Basketball League. It started on 17 April and ended on 23 May 2013. EiffelTowers Den Bosch were the defending champions. ZZ Leiden won the playoffs and its third championship. Aris Leeuwarden, who featured in their first finals ever, finished as runners-up.

== Quarterfinals ==
=== (1) EiffelTowers Den Bosch – (8) Stepco BSW ===
Omroep Brabant

17 April
20:00

http://www.basketballleague.nl/nieuws/1817

EiffelTowers Den Bosch	85–62	Stepco BSW
Scoring by quarter: 13-10, 22-16, 31-21, 19-15
Pts: Akerboom (17); Rebs: Wessels (9); Asts: 3 spelers (3)		Pts: Besseling (17); Rebs: Van Kempen (14); Asts: Fletcher (6)
1-0

Maaspoort, Den Bosch

20 April
20:00

http://www.basketballleague.nl/nieuws/1826

Stepco BSW	65–90	EiffelTowers Den Bosch
Scoring by quarter: 13 - 18, 16 - 22, 21 - 30, 15 - 20
Pts: 2 spelers, 15; Rebs: Antwan Carter, 9 Asts: 2 spelers, 4		Pts: DeJuan Wright, 21; Rebs: Stefan Wessels, 11; Asts: Matt Bauscher, 7

Sporthal Boshoven

23 April
20:00

http://www.basketballleague.nl/nieuws/1835

EiffelTowers Den Bosch	82–62	Stepco BSW
Scoring by quarter: 18 - 19, 24 - 17, 22 - 10, 18 - 16
Pts: Andre Young, 17; Rebs: Will Carter, 9 Asts: Peter van Paassen, 5		Pts: Antwan Carter, 23; Rebs: Antwan Carter, 9 Asts: 2 spelers, 5
Den Bosch wins 3–0

Maaspoort, Den Bosch

=== (2) Zorg en Zekerheid Leiden – (7) Matrixx Magixx ===
17 April
20:00

http://www.basketballleague.nl/nieuws/1818

Zorg en Zekerheid Leiden	64–53	Matrixx Magixx
Scoring by quarter: 15-9, 15-10, 25-13, 9-21
Pts: Slagter (22); Rebs: R. Bekkering (12); Asts: De Jong (4)		Pts: H. Bekkering (14); Rebs: Walker (6); Asts: Ahelegbe (4)

Vijf Meihal, Leiden

20 April
20:00

http://www.basketballleague.nl/nieuws/1827

Matrixx Magixx	54–67	Zorg en Zekerheid Leiden
Scoring by quarter: 19 - 17, 9 - 18, 11 - 20, 15 - 12
Pts: Kwadzo Ahelegbe, 16; Rebs: Robbie Sihota, 15; Asts: Mike Nardi, 4		Pts: Antoine Young, 14; Rebs: Ross Bekkering, 10; Asts: Antoine Young, 4

Sporthal Arcus, Wijchen

23 April
20:00

http://www.basketballleague.nl/nieuws/1837

Zorg en Zekerheid Leiden	88–64	Matrixx Magixx
Scoring by quarter: 26 - 15, 26 - 17, 18 - 15, 18 - 17
Pts: Michael Schachtner, 18; Rebs: Ross Bekkering, 8 Asts: Arvin Slagter, 6		Pts: Henry Bekkering, 14; Rebs: Robbie Sihota, 10; Asts: 2 spelers, 3
Leiden wins 3–0

Vijf Meihal, Leiden

=== (3) GasTerra Flames – (6) Den Helder Kings ===
18 April
19:30

http://www.basketballleague.nl/nieuws/1821

GasTerra Flames	77–61	Den Helder Kings
Scoring by quarter: 19 - 14, 17 - 10, 24 - 11, 17 - 26
Pts: Jessey Voorn, 16; Rebs: Thomas Koenis, 18; Asts: 2 spelers, 4		Pts: Storm Warren, 16; Rebs: Mark Hill, 18; Asts: 3 spelers, 2

MartiniPlaza, Groningen
Attendance: 2.160

20 April
19:30

http://www.basketballleague.nl/nieuws/1825

Den Helder Kings	57–70	GasTerra Flames
Scoring by quarter: 18 - 14, 17 - 14, 10 - 23, 12 - 19
Pts: Jeroen van der List, 12; Rebs: Jeroen van der List, 11; Asts: 2 spelers, 4		Pts: Jamal Boykin, 20; Rebs: Jamal Boykin, 9 Asts: Rogier Jansen, 9

Kingsdome, Den Helder

23 April
19:30

http://www.basketballleague.nl/nieuws/1834

GasTerra Flames	81–50	Den Helder Kings
Scoring by quarter: 22 - 5, 17 - 20, 16 - 11, 26 - 14
Pts: Rogier Jansen, 19; Rebs: Jamal Boykin, 13; Asts: 2 spelers, 5		Pts: Jeroen van der List, 12; Rebs: Jeroen van der List, 8 Asts: Mark Hill, 3
Groningen wins 3–0

MartiniPlaza, Groningen
Attendance: 2.240

=== Aris Leeuwarden vs Landstede Basketbal ===
18 April
20:00

http://www.basketballleague.nl/nieuws/1822

Aris Leeuwarden	73–67	Landstede Basketbal
Scoring by quarter: 17 - 20, 14 - 21, 17 - 11, 25 - 15
Pts: Samme Givens, 19; Rebs: Samme Givens, 14; Asts: Whit Holcomb-Faye, 8		Pts: Tanner Smith, 29; Rebs: Darryl Webb, 15; Asts: Josh Magette, 6

Kalverdijkje, Leeuwarden

21 April
16:00

http://www.basketballleague.nl/nieuws/1830

Landstede Basketbal	67–76	Aris Leeuwarden
Scoring by quarter: 18 - 11, 12 - 22, 15 - 23, 22 - 20
Pts: Tanner Smith, 19; Rebs: Darryl Webb, 14; Asts: Josh Magette, 2		Pts: Whit Holcomb-Faye, 18; Rebs: 2 spelers, 9 Asts: 2 spelers, 5

Landstede Sportcentrum, Zwolle

23 April
20:00

http://www.basketballleague.nl/nieuws/1836

Aris Leeuwarden	68–67	Landstede Basketbal
Scoring by quarter: 20 - 20, 12 - 17, 19 - 18, 27 - 22
Pts: Samme Givens, 18; Rebs: Jerrell Williams, 16; Asts: Whit Holcomb-Faye, 6		Pts: Tanner Smith, 20; Rebs: Darryl Webb, 11; Asts: Josh Magette, 6
Leeuwarden wins 3–0

Kalverdijkje, Leeuwarden

== Semifinals ==
=== (1) EiffelTowers Den Bosch – (4) Aris Leeuwarden ===
1 May
20:00

http://www.basketballleague.nl/nieuws/1842

EiffelTowers Den Bosch	67–82	Aris Leeuwarden
Scoring by quarter: 20 - 22, 19 - 16, 20 - 16, 8 - 28
Pts: Wil Carter, 14; Rebs: 2 spelers, 6 Asts: 2 spelers, 4		Pts: Samme Givens, 22; Rebs: Samme Givens, 13; Asts: Whit Holcomb-Faye, 8

Maaspoort, Den Bosch

5 May
16:00

http://www.basketballleague.nl/nieuws/1852

Aris Leeuwarden	62–60	EiffelTowers Den Bosch
Scoring by quarter: 17 - 10, 8 - 17, 17 - 21, 20 - 12
Pts: Samme Givens, 16; Rebs: Craig Osaikhwuwuomwan, 14; Asts: 2 spelers, 4		Pts: Kees Akerboom, 22; Rebs: Ralf de Pagter, 10; Asts: Andre Young, 5

Kalverdijkje, Leeuwarden

7 May
20:00

http://www.basketballleague.nl/nieuws/1856

EiffelTowers Den Bosch	106–63	Aris Leeuwarden
Scoring by quarter: 24 - 15, 28 - 15, 27 - 13, 27 - 20
Pts: DeJuan Wright, 21; Rebs: Stefan Wessels, 9 Asts: Andre Young, 9		Pts: Samme Givens, 13; Rebs: Samme Givens, 9 Asts: Whit Holcomb-Faye, 7

Maaspoort, Den Bosch

9 May
16:00

http://www.basketballleague.nl/nieuws/1858

Aris Leeuwarden	93–76	EiffelTowers Den Bosch
Scoring by quarter: 27 - 9, 23 - 23, 18 - 14, 25 - 30
Pts: Tjoe de Paula, 23; Rebs: Jerrell Williams, 9 Asts: Whit Holcomb-Faye, 6		Pts: 2 spelers, 15; Rebs: 3 spelers, 6 Asts: Andre Young, 4
Leeuwarden wins 3–1

Kalverdijkje, Leeuwarden

=== (2) Zorg en Zekerheid Leiden – (3) GasTerra Flames ===
1 May
20:00

http://www.basketballleague.nl/nieuws/1843

Zorg en Zekerheid Leiden	75–52	GasTerra Flames
Scoring by quarter: 17 - 16, 25 - 10, 17 - 9, 16 - 17
Pts: Mohamed Kherrazi, 17; Rebs: Mohamed Kherrazi, 9 Asts: Arvin Slagter, 3		Pts: Jason Dourisseau, 13; Rebs: Thomas Koenis, 8 Asts: Nate Rohnert, 4

Vijf Meihal, Leiden

3 May
19:30

http://www.basketballleague.nl/nieuws/1849

GasTerra Flames	57–64	Zorg en Zekerheid Leiden
Scoring by quarter: 6 - 9, 22 - 18, 10 - 13, 19 - 24
Pts: Nate Rohnert, 12; Rebs: Jason Dourisseau, 9 Asts: Rogier Jansen, 5		Pts: 2 spelers, 16; Rebs: 2 spelers, 11; Asts: Arvin Slagter, 2

MartiniPlaza, Groningen
Attendance: 3320

7 May
20:00

http://www.basketballleague.nl/nieuws/1855

Zorg en Zekerheid Leiden	68–64	GasTerra Flames
Scoring by quarter: 14 - 18, 18 - 13, 19 - 18, 17 - 15
Pts: Worthy de Jong, 21; Rebs: Ross Bekkering, 8 Asts: Sean Cunningham, 4		Pts: 2 spelers, 14; Rebs: Thomas Koenis, 12; Asts: 3 spelers, 3
Leiden wins 3–0

Vijf Meihal, Leiden

== Finals: (2) Zorg en Zekerheid Leiden – (4) Aris Leeuwarden ==
15 May
20:00

http://www.basketballleague.nl/nieuws/1864

Zorg en Zekerheid Leiden	74–73	Aris Leeuwarden
Scoring by quarter: 17 - 17, 22 - 21, 9 - 20, 26 - 15
Pts: Sean Cunningham, 15; Rebs: Worthy de Jong, 8 Asts: Arvin Slagter, 7		Pts: Whit Holcomb-Faye, 25; Rebs: Whit Holcomb-Faye, 9 Asts: Whit Holcomb-Faye, 5

Vijf Meihal, Leiden

18 May
20:00

http://www.basketballleague.nl/nieuws/1873

Aris Leeuwarden	63–68	Zorg en Zekerheid Leiden
Scoring by quarter: 12 - 20, 18 - 21, 13 - 11, 20 - 16
Pts: Whit Holcomb-Faye, 20; Rebs: Samme Givens, 7 Asts: Samme Givens, 3		Pts: 2 spelers, 12; Rebs: Ross Bekkering, 15; Asts: 2 spelers, 4

Sporthal Kalverdijkje, Leeuwarden

21 May
20:00

http://www.basketballleague.nl/nieuws/1876

Zorg en Zekerheid Leiden	74–64	Aris Leeuwarden
Scoring by quarter: 18 - 18, 21 - 11, 14 - 14, 21 - 21
Pts: Worthy de Jong, 18; Rebs: Ross Bekkering, 7 Asts: Arvin Slagter, 5		Pts: Samme Givens, 14; Rebs: Samme Givens, 11; Asts: Whit Holcomb-Faye, 7

Vijf Meihal, Leiden

23 May
20:00

http://www.basketballleague.nl/nieuws/1879

Aris Leeuwarden	59–65	Zorg en Zekerheid Leiden
Scoring by quarter: 14 - 11, 16 - 21, 9 - 12, 20 - 21
Pts: Whit Holcomb-Faye, 17; Rebs: Jerrell Williams, 11; Asts: Whit Holcomb-Faye, 4		Pts: Arvin Slagter, 23; Rebs: Ross Bekkering, 12; Asts: Sean Cunningham, 3
Leiden wins 4–0

Sporthal Kalverdijkje, Leeuwarden
