= 2017–18 Israeli Basketball National League =

Israeli Basketball National League
- Season: 2017–18
- Dates: October 15, 2017– May 22, 2018
- Teams: 14
- TV partner: Sport 5

Regular season
- Season MVP: (Israel) Robert Rothbart
- Relegated: Hapoel Migdal HaEmek

Finals
- Champions: Hapoel Be'er Sheva
- Runners-up: Maccabi Kiryat Gat
- Finals MVP: (United States) Storm Warren

Statistical leaders
Points	(United States) Storm Warren	21.9
Rebounds	(Cuba) Ismael Romero	12.8
Assists	(United States) Vernon Teel	8.1
Index Rating	(Israel) Robert Rothbart	26.2

The 2017–18 Israeli Basketball National League (or the Liga Leumit) is the 18th season of the Israeli Basketball National League. It started on October 15, 2017 with the first round of the regular season and ended on May 22, 2018 with the finals. Hapoel Be'er Sheva have won the championship after defeating Maccabi Kiryat Gat 3–0 in a best of five series.

== Teams ==
The following teams had changed divisions after the 2016–17 season:

Relegated from Premier League

- Maccabi Kiryat Gat

Promoted from Liga Artzit

- Maccabi Kiryat Motzkin
- Elitzur Yavne

=== Venues and locations ===
Team	City	Arena	Capacity
Elitzur Yavne	Yavne	Ralf Klain Hall	600
Hapoel Afula	Afula	Nir Ha'emak Hall	1,000
Hapoel Be'er Sheva	Be'er Sheva	Conch Arena	3,000
Hapoel Galil Elyon/Safed	Upper Galilee and Safed	HaPais Kfar Blum	2,200
Hapoel Haifa	Haifa	Romema Arena	5,000
Hapoel Kfar Saba	Kfar Saba	HaYovel Kfar Saba	680
Hapoel Migdal HaEmek	Migdal HaEmek	Yearot HaEmek	850
Hapoel Ramat Gan Givatayim	Ramat Gan and Givatayim	Zisman Hall	1,400
Ironi Kiryat Ata	Kiryat Ata	Ramaz Hall	1,000
Maccabi Hod HaSharon	Hod HaSharon	Atidim Hall	400
Maccabi Kiryat Gat	Kiryat Gat	Ashkelon Sports Arena	3,000
Maccabi Kiryat Motzkin	Kiryat Motzkin	Goshen Hall	750
Maccabi Ra'anana	Ra'anana	Metro West	1,850
Maccabi Rehovot	Rehovot	Katzir Hall	500

== League table ==
=== Regular season ===
Pos	Team	Pld	W	L	PF	PA	PD	Pts	Qualification or relegation
1	Maccabi Kiryat Gat	26	19	7	2283	2182	+101	45	Advance to playoffs
2	Ironi Kiryat Ata	26	18	8	2285	2146	+139	44	Advance to playoffs
3	Hapoel Be'er Sheva	26	18	8	2221	2131	+90	44	Advance to playoffs
4	Maccabi Rehovot	26	18	8	2140	1991	+149	44	Advance to playoffs
5	Maccabi Ra'anana	26	18	8	2240	2124	+116	44	Advance to playoffs
6	Hapoel Galil Elyon	26	14	12	2208	2094	+114	40	Advance to playoffs
7	Hapoel Ramat Gan Givatayim	26	12	14	2155	2143	+12	38	Advance to playoffs
8	Hapoel Kfar Saba	26	11	15	2000	2108	−108	37	Advance to playoffs
9	Maccabi Kiryat Motzkin	26	11	15	2077	2176	−99	37	Advance to playouts
10	Elitzur Yavne	26	10	16	2156	2222	−66	36	Advance to playouts
11	Hapoel Haifa	26	9	17	2052	2131	−79	35	Advance to playouts
12	Hapoel Afula	26	9	17	2144	2206	−62	35	Advance to playouts
13	Maccabi Hod HaSharon	26	9	17	2174	2305	−131	35	Advance to playouts
14	Hapoel Migdal HaEmek	26	6	20	2152	2328	−176	32	Advance to playouts

Updated to match(es) played on April 10, 2018. Source: ibasketball.co.il

=== Playouts ===
Pos	Team	Pld	W	L	PF	PA	PD	Pts	Qualification or relegation
1	Elitzur Yavne	31	14	17	2577	2632	−55	45	
2	Hapoel Afula	31	13	18	2568	2598	−30	44	
3	Maccabi Hod HaSharon	31	12	19	2595	2700	−105	43	
4	Maccabi Kiryat Motzkin	31	12	19	2513	2641	−128	43	
5	Hapoel Haifa	31	11	20	2429	2509	−80	42	
6	Hapoel Migdal HaEmek (R)	31	7	24	2605	2820	−215	38	Relegation to Liga Artzit

Updated to match(es) played on May 1, 2018. Source: ibasketball.co.il
(R) Relegated

== Playoffs ==
Quarter-finals
1 Maccabi Kiryat Gat	2
8 Hapoel Kfar Saba	1
4 Maccabi Rehovot	2
5 Maccabi Ra'anana	1
2 Ironi Kiryat Ata	1
7 Hapoel Ramat Gan Givatayim	2
3 Hapoel Be'er Sheva	2
6 Hapoel Galil Elyon	1

Semi-finals
Maccabi Kiryat Gat	3
Maccabi Rehovot	0
Hapoel Ramat Gan Givatayim	2
Hapoel Be'er Sheva	3

Final
Maccabi Kiryat Gat	0
Hapoel Be'er Sheva	3

== Statistical leaders ==
=== Points ===
Pos	Player	Club	PPG
1	(United States) Storm Warren	Hapoel Be'er Sheva	21.9
2	(Cuba) Ismael Romero	Hapoel Haifa	21.0
3	(United States) Folarin Campbell	Maccabi Kiryat Motzkin	21.0
4	(United States) Jimmy Hall	Hapoel Migdal HaEmek	20.4
5	(United States) Byron Wesley	Hapoel Kfar Saba	20.2

=== Assists ===
Pos	Player	Club	APG
1	(United States) Vernon Teel	Maccabi Hod HaSharon	8.1
2	(Israel) Nimrod Tishman	Maccabi Kiryat Gat	5.8
3	(Israel) Guy Lavie	Maccabi Ra'anana	5.7
4	(United States) Folarin Campbell	Maccabi Kiryat Motzkin	5.5
5	(Israel) Gal Gilinski	Hapoel Galil Elyon	5.3

=== Rebounds ===
Pos	Player	Club	RPG
1	(Cuba) Ismael Romero	Hapoel Haifa	12.8
2	(Israel) Robert Rothbart	Maccabi Kiryat Gat	12.2
3	(United States) Jimmy Hall	Hapoel Migdal HaEmek	11.3
4	(United States) Brandon Edwards	Hapoel Galil Elyon	10.9
5	(United States) Germain Jordan	Elitzur Yavne	10.8

=== Efficiency ===
Pos	Player	Club	PIR
1	(Israel) Robert Rothbart	Maccabi Kiryat Gat	26.2
2	(United States) Brandon Edwards	Hapoel Galil Elyon	25.2
3	(United States) Samme Givens	Maccabi Ra'anana	24.2
4	(United States) Jeff Allen	Hapoel Afula	24.1
5	(United States) Storm Warren	Hapoel Be'er Sheva	23.6

=== Other statistics ===
Category	Player	Team	Average
Steals	(United States) Vernon Teel	Maccabi Hod HaSharon	3.0
Blocks	(Israel) Robert Rothbart	Maccabi Kiryat Gat	2.0
Turnovers	(United States) Folarin Campbell	Maccabi Kiryat Motzkin	4.3
Minutes	(United States) Vernon Teel	Maccabi Hod HaSharon	38:16
2P%	(United States) Brandon Edwards	Hapoel Galil Elyon	62.7%
3P%	(Israel) Tony Younger	Hapoel Be'er Sheva	43.6%
FT%	(United States) Rashad Madden	Hapoel Ramat Gan Givatayim	82.6%

Source: ibasketball.co.il

== Awards ==
=== Finals MVP ===
Pos.	Player	Team
F/C	(United States) Storm Warren	Hapoel Be'er Sheva

=== Regular season MVP ===
Pos.	Player	Team
C	(Israel) Robert Rothbart	Maccabi Kiryat Gat

=== Coach of the Year ===
Coach	Team
(Israel) Yaniv Burger	Hapoel Be'er Sheva

=== All-League First Team ===
First Team
Pos.	Player	Team
G	(Israel) Guy Lavie	Maccabi Ra'anana
G	(Israel) Nimrod Tishman	Maccabi Kiryat Gat
F	(United States) Malik Cooke	Ironi Kiryat Ata
F/C	(United States) Storm Warren	Hapoel Be'er Sheva
C	(Israel) Robert Rothbart	Maccabi Kiryat Gat

Source: EuroBasket.com

== See also ==
- 2017–18 Israeli Basketball Premier League
- 2017–18 Israeli Basketball State Cup
