= List of Dutch Basketball League season rebounding leaders =

In basketball, a rebound is the act of gaining possession of the ball after a missed field goal or free throw. The Dutch Basketball League's (DBL) rebounding title is awarded to the player with the highest rebounds per game average in a given regular season. The rebounding title was first recognized in the 1985–1986 season when statistics on rebounds were first compiled.

== Leaders ==
Key
Player (X)	Name of the player and number of times they had won the award at that point (if more than one)
Club (X)	Name of the club and the number of times a player of it has won the award (if more than one)
^	Denotes player who is still active in the DBL

Season	Player	Nationality	Team	Total	RPG
1985–86	Philip Schaftenaar	Netherlands	BC Markt Utrecht	478	14.48
1986–87	Victor Alexander	United States	BS Weert	473	13.51
1987–88	Mike Reddick	United States	EBBC Den Bosch	394	10.94
1988–89	Cedric Miller	United States	Rotterdam	550	15.28
1989–90	Maurice Smith	United States	BC Eindhoven	389	11.79
1990–91	Maurice Smith (2)	United States	BC Eindhoven	423	14.58
1991–92	Ray Wingard	United States	DAS Delft	471	14.71
1992–93	Marcus Campbell	United States	Red Giants Meppel	310	11.07
1993–94	Paul van Maren	Netherlands	Rotterdam	179	11.18
1994–95	Ray Wingard (2)	United States	Red Giants Meppel	363	12.96
1995–96	Ed de Haas	Netherlands	Amsterdam	363	12.96
1996–97	Drew Henderson	Netherlands (Note: Henderson was born in the United States, but represented the Netherlands in international play.)	Assist Assen	285	15.83
1997–98	Drew Henderson (2)	Netherlands	Virtus Werkendam	386	13.79
1998–99	Drew Henderson (3)	Netherlands	Virtus Werkendam	355	13.65
1999–2000	Eric Dow	United States	BS Weert	395	12.34
2000–01	Lamont Randolph	United States	Donar	336	12.44
2001–02	Jamie Holmes	Germany	BS Weert	225	10.71
2002–03	Maurice Ingram	United States	Donar	339	13.03
2003–04	Ian Hanavan	United States	Omniworld Almere	440	12.22
2004–05	Maurice Ingram (2)	United States	BS Weert	391	13.96
2005–06	Maurice Ingram (3)	United States	BS Weert	366	14.07
2006–07	Ransford Brempong	Canada	Matrixx Magixx	419	11.02
2007–08	Dillion Sneed	United States	Aris Leeuwarden	412	10.30
2008–09	Marcus Jackson	United States	BS Weert	395	10.67
2009–10	Patrick Hilliman	Netherlands	Rotterdam Basketbal College	365	10.10
2010–11	Robbie Sihota	Canada (Note: Sihota also has the Indian nationality.)	Rotterdam Basketbal College	383	10.63
2011–12	Yamene Coleman	United States	BS Weert	283	10.10
2012–13	Darryl Webb	United States	Landstede Basketbal	356	9.89
2013–14	Kenneth van Kempen	Netherlands	BS Weert	321	8.91
2014–15	Kenneth van Kempen (2)	Netherlands	BS Weert	308	11.00
2015–16	Ross Bekkering	Canada (Note: Bekkering also holds the Dutch nationality.)	Donar	293	10.46
2016–17	Charles Mitchell	United States	New Heroes Den Bosch	218	10.9
2017–18	Roel Aarts	Netherlands	BAL	260	8.1
2018–19	Tony Washington	United States	BAL	351	11.3
2019–20 (Note: The 2019–20 season was cancelled prematurely due to the COVID-19 pandemic.)	Mohamed Kherrazi	Netherlands	Landstede Hammers	176	8.8
2020–21	Quatarrius Wilson	United States	BAL	217	10.3
2021–22 (Note: Since the 2021–22 season, the DBL was re-placed by the BNXT League. The season scoring leaders are the players from Dutch clubs with the highest point average in the domestic phase (excluding playoffs).)	Jonathan Holton	United States	Feyenoord		10.7
2022–23	Arnaldo Toro Barea	Puerto Rico	Landstede Hammers	109	13.1
