= BT Wevelgem =

- Founded: 1955
- Dissolved: 2008
- Arena: De Schelp
- Location: Wevelgem, Belgium

Basket-Team Wevelgem was a basketball team based in Wevelgem, Belgium. It got promoted to the first Belgian division for the first time in 1997. The team was long known as Power Wevelgem, as it was sponsored by the company Power Oil for 15 years, but ceased to exist in 2008 due to financial problems. Its successor Holstra Wings, emerged shortly after, under a new registration number (5022) as a new distinct legal entity.

== History ==
BT Wevelgem, originally founded as TeBa Wevelgem in 1954 by Roger Godin and Lucien Hespel, was a club that combined tennis and basketball. It joined the Belgian Basketball Federation in 1955 under the registration number 874. Early games were played outdoors, with facilities evolving over time. In 1977, a dispute between tennis and basketball led to the club’s split, and the basketball division continued as BBC Wevelgem.

The club played in regional leagues until 1979, when it advanced to the fourth division. Despite relegation in 1982, it quickly bounced back, returning to the fourth division in 1983. With coach Pat Gevaert in 1988, the club began its rise, securing promotion to the third division by 1992 and then to second division. After fluctuating results, BT Wevelgem reached the first division in 1997.

The club debuted in the first division with foreign players like Andy Gardiner and Carlos Clark. The team showed promise, defeating Oostende in a notable game, but finished eleventh. Despite struggles in the following seasons, including missing playoffs, the club remained competitive, with highlights like reaching the Belgian Basketball Cup semi-finals in 2001.

By 2003, the club faced challenges, finishing at the bottom, but secured survival in a test match. New coach Tony Vandenbosch led the team with fresh ambitions, bringing in top players like Wim Van de Keere and Hugo Sterk.

In 2008 the club faced a financial crisis, being virtually bankrupt for six months. In May, the club was involved in a legal dispute with the tax authorities over unpaid debts totaling 70,000 euros. Despite a court order to pay immediately, the debt remained unpaid, and the court's ruling was upheld in September. In early November, a curator was appointed to recover the funds.

The Court of Appeal of Ghent subsequently ordered the immediate liquidation of the club due to outstanding debts with the ONSS, which claimed 65,000 euros. The curator stated that the club was legally unable to play basketball, as its activities were restricted to liquidation efforts. Nevertheless, BT Wevelgem expressed its intent to continue playing, and the club met with the curator to determine the next steps. At the time of the financial issues, BT Wevelgem was in third place in Belgium's Division 2, just two points behind the leaders, Sint-Jan.

Eventually, BT Wevelgem was dissolved in december 2008. The youth teams were given a new registration number (5022) and continued under the name Jong Basket Wevelgem.
