= Henry Bekkering =

Canadian basketball player

Personal information
- Born: November 26, 1985 (age 40) Taber, Alberta
- Listed height: 6 ft 6 in (1.98 m)
- Listed weight: 245 lb (111 kg)

Career information
- High school: W. R. Myers (Taber, Alberta)
- College: Eastern Washington (2003–2006); Calgary (2006–2009)
- NBA draft: 2009: undrafted
- Playing career: 2009–2013
- Position: Small forward
- Number: 5, 11, 15

Career history
- 2009–2010: Matrixx Magixx
- 2010–2011: GasTerra Flames
- 2011–2013: Matrixx Magixx

Career highlights
- Dutch Cup champion (2011)

Hendrik "Henry" Bekkering (born November 26, 1985) is a Canadian former professional basketball player who holds a Dutch passport as well. Bekkering is the elder brother of Ross Bekkering, who also played professional basketball.

== College career ==
Bekkering initially attended Eastern Washington University in the United States where he played both basketball and American football as a placekicker before leaving to return to Canada to attend the University of Calgary and play for the Dinos; he was drafted in the fifth round of 2007 CFL draft by the Calgary Stampeders but ultimately did not play professional Canadian football.

While playing for the Calgary Dinos, Bekkering scored 41 points in a game in 2009. It was the first time a Calgary Dino scored over 40 points since 1997.

== Professional career ==
Bekkering started his career in 2009 in the Netherlands with Matrixx Magixx. He played one year for GasTerra Flames before returning to the Magixx. In 2013, Bekkering retired.
