= Tanner Smith (basketball) =

American basketball coach and former player (born 1990)

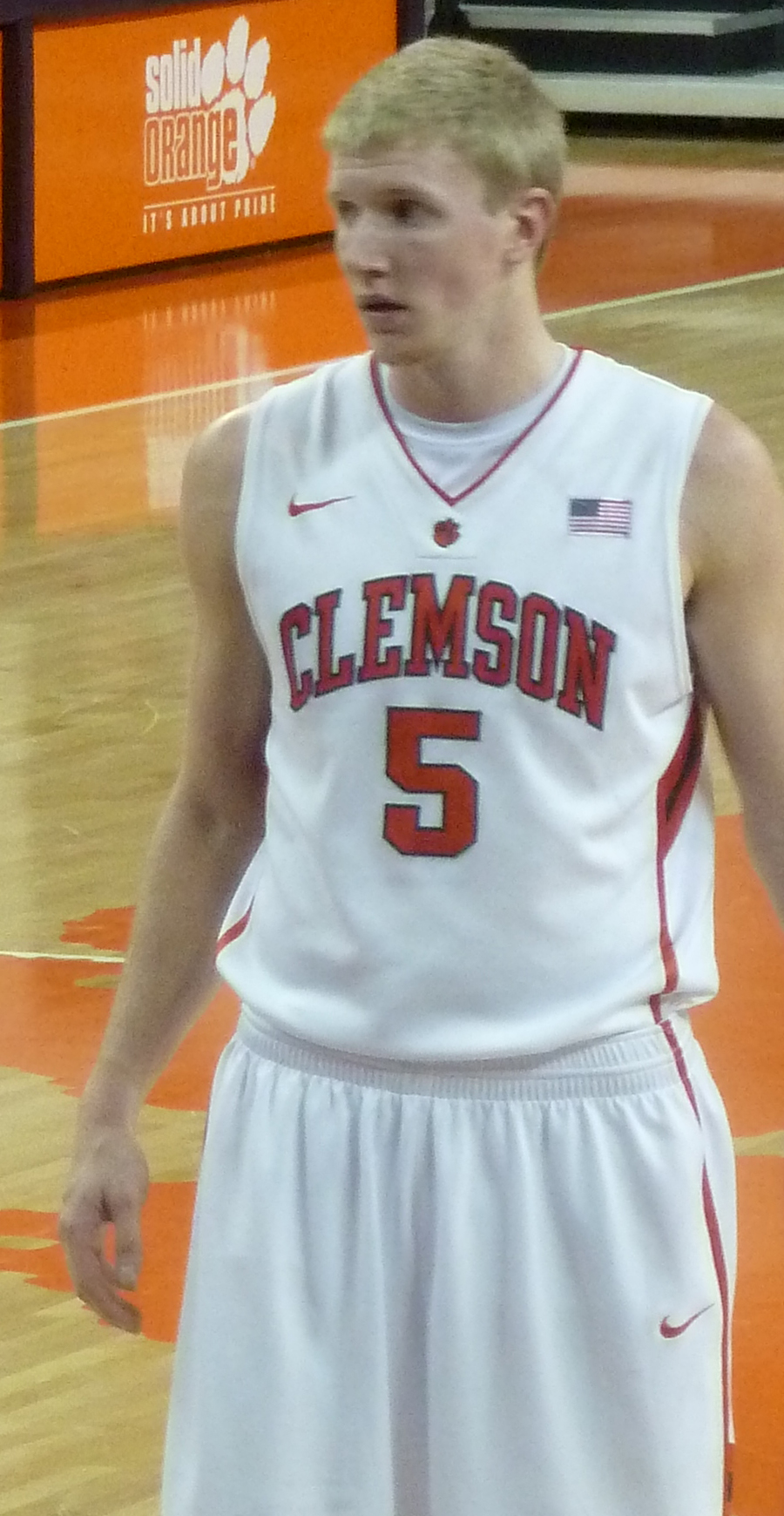
- Smith with Clemson in 2011

West Florida Argonauts
- Title: Head coach
- League: Atlantic Sun Conference

Personal information
- Born: March 30, 1990 (age 36) Alpharetta, Georgia, U.S.
- Listed height: 6 ft 5 in (1.96 m)
- Listed weight: 210 lb (95 kg)

Career information
- High school: Wesleyan School (Norcross, Georgia)
- College: Clemson (2008–2012)
- NBA draft: 2012: undrafted
- Playing career: 2012–2014
- Position: Shooting guard
- Number: 5
- Coaching career: 2014–present

Career history

Playing
- 2012–2013: Landstede Basketbal
- 2013–2014: MHP Riesen Ludwigsburg

Coaching
- 2014–2015: Mississippi State (graduate assistant)
- 2015–2017: Charlotte (Dir. of Basketball Operations)
- 2017–2018: Charlotte (assistant)
- 2018–2019: Mississippi State (Dir. of Basketball Operations)
- 2019–2021: Kennesaw State (assistant)
- 2021–2023: Stephen F. Austin (assistant)
- 2023–2026: Appalachian State (assistant)
- 2026–present: West Florida

Career highlights
- Dutch League All-Star (2013)

Tanner James Smith (born March 30, 1990) is an American college basketball coach and former professional basketball player who is currently the head coach of the West Florida Argonauts of the Atlantic Sun Conference.

== Early life ==
Smith played high school basketball at Wesleyan School in Norcross, Georgia. He was rated as a 3-star prospect in high school and as the #22 small forward in the nation by Scout.com and given a Scout Grade of 87 on ESPN.com. He was also rated 16th in the state of Georgia by Rivals.com, two spots lower than his future teammate and roommate at Clemson, Andre Young.

On September 13, 2007, Smith committed to play college basketball for Clemson under coach Oliver Purnell, over offers from Oregon, Michigan, Vanderbilt, Georgia, Auburn, and Cincinnati. Smith chose Clemson due to its location; he said it was far enough away from home for him to be independent, but still close enough that his parents could come to his games. Smith was also eager to play in the Atlantic Coast Conference, a league that he remembered "watching as a kid."

== College career ==
Smith started for three seasons as a guard on the Clemson Tigers men's basketball team. He graduated in December 2011 with a degree in Marketing, and finished playing his final season as a graduate student.

Smith earned numerous awards throughout his college career, including the 2011 C. J. Spiller Award, given to a student-athlete chosen by the Clemson student body for "exceptional representation of the school through athletics and academics." He also received Clemson's "Mr. Effort Award," given to the athlete that exhibits the most "hustle," and the 2011 "Tiger Pride Award," given to the Clemson athlete who best embodies the term "student-athlete". Smith was also a four-time member of the All-ACC Academic Team, making him only the second player in Clemson history to make the team all four years.

== Professional career ==
Smith played his first professional season in the Dutch Basketball League, playing for Landstede Basketbal from Zwolle. In July 2013, Smith signed with MHP RIESEN Ludwigsburg in Germany.

== Coaching career ==
Smith began coaching in 2014, serving as a graduate assistant for Mississippi State.

He served as the Director of Basketball Operations at Charlotte for two seasons before being promoted to a full-time assistant coach in 2017.

In 2018, Smith returned to Mississippi State as Director of Basketball Operations.

In 2019, Smith joined Kennesaw State as an assistant coach.

From 2021 through 2026, Smith served as an assistant coach at Stephen F. Austin and Appalachian State.

=== West Florida (2026–present) ===
In April 2026, Smith was hired as the head coach at the University of West Florida.

== Tanner's Totes ==
As a child, Smith was assigned to write a paper about his three wishes. In it, he wrote that he wished for a Golden Retriever, to become a professional basketball player, and to help kids with cancer. Smith established Tanner's Totes when he was in the sixth grade, after he reiterated his wish to cheer up kids with cancer. Tanner's Totes is a non-profit organization to cheer up children and teenagers with cancer through donations of large tote bags filled with toys and other recreational items. Tanner's Totes has delivered over 3,000 totes to hospitals in 25 states across the U.S.

== Head coaching record ==
=== College ===
Record table
Season	Team	Overall	Conference	Standing	Postseason
West Florida Argonauts (Atlantic Sun Conference) (2026–present)
2026–27	West Florida	3–3	0–0		
West Florida:		3–3 (.500)	0–0 (–)		
Total:		3–3 (.500)			
National champion Postseason invitational champion Conference regular season champion Conference regular season and conference tournament champion Division regular season champion Division regular season and conference tournament champion Conference tournament champion

== Career statistics ==
=== College ===
Season Averages
Season	Team	G	PPG	RPG	APG	SPG	BPG	FG%	3P%	FT%	MPG	TO	FGM-FGA	3PM-3PA	FTM-FTA
2008–09	Clemson	32	3.6	1.8	1.1	0.9	0.2	.448	.357	.667	13.2	1.1	1.3-3.0	0.5-1.3	0.4-0.7
2009–10	Clemson	32	8.7	4.2	2.2	1.2	0.4	.401	.275	.740	24.9	2.1	2.8-6.9	0.8-2.8	2.3-3.1
2010–11	Clemson	32	7.8	3.5	2.8	1.3	0.3	.411	.333	.728	29.3	1.9	2.5-6.0	1.0-2.9	1.8-2.5
2011–12	Clemson	31	11.2	5.1	4.1	1.7	0.2	.457	.351	.721	32.6	2.1	3.9-8.6	1.3-3.7	2.0-2.8
Career Averages:			7.8	3.7	2.6	1.3	0.3	0.429	.329	.714	25	1.8	2.6-6.1	0.9-2.7	1.6-2.3

Season Totals
Season	Team	G	PTS	REB	AST	STL	BLK	FG%	3P%	FT%	MIN	TO	FGM-FGA	3PM-3PA	FTM-FTA
2008–09	Clemson	32	115	57	34	29	6	.448	.357	.667	422	36	43-96	15-42	14-21
2009–10	Clemson	32	277	133	69	37	13	.401	.275	.740	798	66	89-222	25-91	74-100
2010–11	Clemson	32	248	112	89	41	8	.411	.333	.728	936	60	79-192	31-93	59-81
2011–12	Clemson	31	346	157	128	52	7	.457	.351	.721	1011	65	122-267	40-114	62-86
Career Totals:		127	986	459	320	159	34	0.429	.329	.714	3165	227	333-777	40-340	209-288
