= Chad Frazier =

American basketball player (born 1992)

Personal information
- Born: August 22, 1992 (age 34) Boston, Massachusetts, U.S.
- Listed height: 6 ft 4 in (1.93 m)
- Listed weight: 194 lb (88 kg)

Career information
- High school: First Assembly Christian School (Concord, North Carolina)
- College: Gulf Coast State (2011–2013); UAB (2013–2014)
- NBA draft: 2015: undrafted
- Playing career: 2015–2023
- Position: Point guard / shooting guard

Career history
- 2015–2016: Nea Kifissia
- 2016: Nevėžis
- 2016–2017: Cape Breton Highlanders
- 2017–2018: Windsor Express
- 2018–2019: Bakirkoy Basket
- 2020–2021: Aris Leeuwarden
- 2021–2022: Paulus Pärnu
- 2022–2023: KW Titans

Career highlights
- First-team All-Conference USA (2014)

Chad Frazier (born August 22, 1992) is an American former professional basketball player. He played college basketball at Gulf Coast State College and UAB.

Frazier played two seasons at Gulf Coast State College and averaged 15.6 points, 4.7 assists, and 3.9 rebounds per game as a sophomore. He committed to Oklahoma State and Texas A&M before choosing UAB. Frazier was the 16th best junior college prospect according to JUCORecruiting.com. As a junior at UAB, Frazier averaged 17.7 points, 4.3 assists, and 3.3 rebounds per game. He was named to the First Team All-Conference USA as well as the conference newcomer of the year. On August 6, he announced he was turning professional and not returning to college, after being charged with domestic violence, although the case was dismissed due to evidence in court on June 24th, per AL.com. Frazier had one year of collegiate eligibility remaining.

== Professional career ==
After going undrafted in the 2014 NBA draft, Frazier turned professional in 2015, playing in leagues across Europe and Canada.

=== Nea Kifissia (Greece – HEBA A1, 2015–16) ===
Frazier began his professional career with Nea Kifissia in the Greek Basket League. He appeared in 4 games, averaging 0.5 PPG, 1.0 RPG, and 0.8 APG (20.0% FG, 0.0% 3PT, 0.0% FT). Highlights: Professional debut; limited role.

=== BC Nevėžis (Lithuania – LKL, 2015–16) ===
Frazier moved to BC Nevėžis mid-season. In 2 games, he averaged 1.0 PPG, 0.5 RPG, and 0.5 APG (50.0% FG). Highlights: Brief stint.

=== Cape Breton Highlanders (NBL Canada, 2016–17) ===
With the Cape Breton Highlanders, Frazier had a breakout season, earning All-NBL Canada Second Team honors. In 35 games, he averaged 16.7 PPG, 4.2 RPG, and 5.0 APG (46.5% FG, 28.6% 3PT, 80.5% FT). As a starter in approximately 20 games, he averaged around 20 PPG, 5 RPG, and 5 APG, with a strong finish (19.2 PPG and 5.6 APG over the final 27 games). Highlights: All-NBL Canada Second Team; career-high 37 points (January 26, 2017).

=== Windsor Express (NBL Canada, 2017–18) ===
Frazier played for the Windsor Express. In 32 regular season games, he averaged 15.7 PPG, 3.4 RPG, and 2.7 APG (48.4% FG, 39.7% 3PT, 80.1% FT). In playoffs, he averaged 19.0 PPG.

=== Sigortam.net Bakirkoy (Turkey – TBL, 2018–19) ===
Frazier signed with Sigortam.net (formerly Bakirkoy Basket), earning TBL Sixth Man of the Year and helping lead the team to the TBL Finals. In 29 regular season games, he averaged 14.5 PPG, 3.8 RPG, and 2.5 APG (47.2% FG, 33.8% 3PT, 85.3% FT). Highlights: TBL Sixth Man of the Year; TBL Finals appearance.

=== Aris Leeuwarden / LWD Basket (Netherlands – DBL, 2020–21) ===
In the Dutch DBL, Frazier averaged 12.7 PPG, 4.9 RPG, and 4.0 APG (45.5% FG, 29.8% 3PT, 70.3% FT) in 11 games. Highlights: Career-high 11 rebounds (March 6, 2021).

=== Pärnu Sadam (Latvia/Estonia – Latvian-Estonian League, 2021–22) ===
Frazier had a brief stint with Pärnu Sadam. In 3 games, he averaged 8.3 PPG, 3.0 RPG, and 0.7 APG (57.1% FG, 60.0% 3PT, 85.7% FT).

=== KW Titans (NBL Canada, 2021–22) ===
In his debut with the KW Titans, Frazier earned NBLC All-Star selection. In 14 regular season games, he averaged 18.2 PPG, 4.4 RPG, and 4.0 APG (49.7% FG, 36.8% 3PT, 80.4% FT). Highlights: NBLC All-Star (2022).

=== Kutaisi (Georgia – Superliga, 2022–23) ===
Frazier played briefly in Georgia. In 5 games, he averaged 10.2 PPG, 3.0 RPG, and 3.8 APG (36.2% FG, 40.0% 3PT, 90.0% FT).

=== KW Titans (NBL Canada, 2022–23) ===
Frazier returned to the KW Titans as a returning All-Star. In 3 games, he averaged 8.7 PPG, 4.7 RPG, and 2.3 APG (29.0% FG, 35.3% 3PT, 66.7% FT). Highlights: Returning All-Star reference.

=== Career statistics ===
==== Regular season ====
Season	Team	League	GP	PPG	RPG	APG	FG%	3PT%	FT%	Notable awards/highlights
2015–16	Nea Kifissia	Greece HEBA A1	4	0.5	1.0	0.8	20.0	0.0	0.0	Professional debut
2015–16	BC Nevėžis	Lithuania LKL	2	1.0	0.5	0.5	50.0	—	—	
2016–17	Cape Breton Highlanders	NBL Canada	35	16.7	4.2	5.0	46.5	28.6	80.5	All-NBL Canada Second Team; ~20/5/5 as starter (~20 games)
2017–18	Windsor Express	NBL Canada	32	15.7	3.4	2.7	48.4	39.7	80.1	
2018–19	Sigortam.net Bakirkoy	Turkey TBL	29	14.5	3.8	2.5	47.2	33.8	85.3	TBL Sixth Man of the Year; TBL Finals
2020–21	Aris Leeuwarden	Netherlands DBL	11	12.7	4.9	4.0	45.5	29.8	70.3	
2021–22	Pärnu Sadam	Latvia/Estonia	3	8.3	3.0	0.7	57.1	60.0	85.7	
2021–22	KW Titans	NBL Canada	14	18.2	4.4	4.0	49.7	36.8	80.4	NBLC All-Star
2022–23	Kutaisi	Georgia Superliga	5	10.2	3.0	3.8	36.2	40.0	90.0	
2022–23	KW Titans	NBL Canada	3	8.7	4.7	2.3	29.0	35.3	66.7	Returning All-Star reference
Career (regular season)			138	14.5	3.8	3.4	~46.1	~34.7	~80.8	All-NBL Canada Second Team (2017); TBL Sixth Man of the Year (2019); NBLC All-Star (2022)
