= Storm Warren =

American basketball player (born 1988)

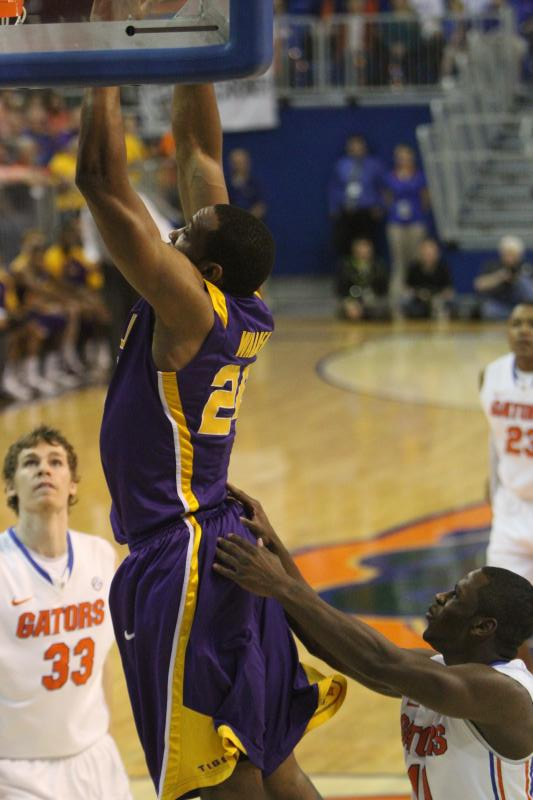

No. 24 – Hapoel Ramat Gan Givatayim
- Position: Power forward / center
- League: Israeli Basketball Premier League

Personal information
- Born: November 4, 1988 (age 38) Monroe, Louisiana
- Listed height: 6 ft 7 in (2.01 m)
- Listed weight: 230 lb (104 kg)

Career information
- High school: Richwood (Ouachita Parish, Louisiana)
- College: LSU (2008–2012)
- NBA draft: 2012: undrafted
- Playing career: 2012–present

Career history
- 2012–2013: Den Helder Kings
- 2013–2014: Namika Lahti
- 2014–2016: Nantes
- 2016–2017: Maccabi Hod HaSharon
- 2017–2018: Hapoel Be'er Sheva
- 2018–2019: Maccabi Rehovot
- 2019–2021: Biguá
- 2021: Bnei Herzliya
- 2022–present: Hapoel Ramat Gan Givatayim B.C.

Career highlights
- Israeli National League champion (2018); Israeli National League Finals MVP (2018)

Storm Warren (born November 4, 1988) is an American professional basketball player for Hapoel Ramat Gan Givatayim B.C. of the Israeli Basketball Premier League. He played college basketball for Louisiana State University before playing professionally in the Netherlands, Finland, France and Israel. Warren was named the Israeli National League Finals MVP in 2018.

== Early life and college career ==
Warren attended Richwood High School in Ouachita Parish, Louisiana, where he was named MVP of the Louisiana Sports Writers Association Class AAA team (third time as a member) and member of the All-Tournament team at the Top 28 state tournament.

Warren played college basketball for the Louisiana State University's Tigers, where he averaged 8.2 points and 5 rebounds in his senior year. Warren finished his college career with 500 rebounds (608)-100 blocks (121)-100 steals (112), just the third player to reach those marks combined in LSU history.

On March 31, 2012, Warren participated in the Reese's College All-Star game.

== Professional career ==
=== Den Helder Kings (2012–2013) ===
On August 24, 2012, Warren started his professional career with the Dutch team Den Helder Kings, signing a one-year deal. That season, Warren helped Den Helder reach the 2013 DBL Playoffs, where they eventually lost to GasTerra Flames.

=== Namika Lahti (2013–2014) ===
On September 19, 2013, Warren signed with the Finnish team Namika Lahti for the 2013–14 season.

=== Nantes (2014–2016) ===
On June 5, 2014, Warren signed with the French team Hermine Nantes Basket of the LNB Pro B. On June 18, 2015, Warren signed a one-year contract extension with Nantes. In his second season with Nantes, he averaged 13.6 points and 7.2 rebounds per game.

=== Maccabi Hod HaSharon (2016–2017) ===
On September 5, 2016, Warren signed with the Israeli team Maccabi Hod HaSharon of the Liga Leumit. On January 10, 2017, Warren recorded a career-high 50 points, shooting 18-of-27 from the field, along with 11 rebounds and 5 steals in a 97–86 win over Hapoel Migdal Haemek. Warren led Hod Hasharon to the 2017 Liga Leumit Semifinals, where they eventually lost 1–3 to Ironi Nes Ziona in a playoff series. Warren finished the season as the league top scorer by averaging 23.6 points per game, he was also the third-leading rebounder with 11.2 per game.

=== Hapoel Be'er Sheva (2017–2018) ===
On July 5, 2017, Warren signed with Hapoel Be'er Sheva for the 2017–18 season. Warren led the league in scoring with 21.9 points per game, along with 10 rebounds and 23.6 PIR per game. On May 22, 2018, Warren helped Be'er Sheva promote to the Premier League for the first time in their history, after they swept Maccabi Kiryat Gat in a best of five series. He was subsequently named Finals MVP.

On June 21, 2018, Warren signed a one-year contract extension with Be'er Sheva. On October 12, 2018, he parted ways with Be'er Sheva.

=== Maccabi Rehovot (2018–2019) ===
On October 27, 2018, Warren signed with Maccabi Rehovot for the 2018–19 season. On January 16, 2019, Warren parted ways with Rehovot after appearing in 15 games.

=== Biguá (2019–2021) ===
On January 17, 2019, Warren signed with Club Biguá de Villa Biarritz of the Uruguayan Basketball League.

=== Bnei Herzliya (2021) ===
On May 23, 2021, he has signed with for Bnei Herzliya Basket in the Israeli Basketball Premier League.
