= West Florida Argonauts men's basketball =

2026–27 West Florida Argonauts men's basketball team
- University: University of West Florida
- First season: 1967–68
- Head coach: Tanner Smith (1st season)
- Location: Pensacola, Florida
- Arena: UWF Field House (capacity: 1,750)
- Conference: Atlantic Sun Conference
- Nickname: Argonauts
- Colors: Royal blue and Kelly green
- All-time record: 563–540

NCAA Division II tournament appearances
- 2018, 2026

Conference tournament champions
- Gulf South: 2018, 2026
- Website: https://goargos.com/sports/mens-basketball

The West Florida Argonauts men's basketball team represents the University of West Florida in Pensacola, Florida, United States in men's basketball within the National Collegiate Athletic Association (NCAA). The Argonauts will join the Division I Atlantic Sun Conference on July 1, 2026, after 32 seasons in the Division II Gulf South Conference.

On April 7, 2026, West Florida announced the hiring of Tanner Smith, plays its home games at UWF Field House.

== Conference affiliations ==
- 1967–68 to 1974–75 – NAIA Independent
- 1975–76; 1993–94 – Southern States Conference (Note: No team from 1976–77 to 1992–93.)
- 1994–95 to 2025–26 – Gulf South Conference
- 2026–27 to Present – Atlantic Sun Conference

== Year-by-year results ==
Season	Conference affiliation	Win–loss (overall)	Win–loss (conference)	Conference finish	Postseason	Head coach
1967–68	NAIA Independent	19–3	n/a	n/a		Marvin Beck
1968–69	NAIA Independent	18–8	n/a	n/a		Marvin Beck
1969–70	NAIA Independent	13–12	n/a	n/a		Marvin Beck
1970–71	NAIA Independent	10–12	n/a	n/a		Marvin Beck
1971–72	NAIA Independent	14–12	n/a	n/a		Marvin Beck
1972–73	NAIA Independent	12–14	n/a	n/a		Marvin Beck
1973–74	NAIA Independent	12–17	n/a	n/a		Marvin Beck
1974–75	NAIA Independent	9–15	n/a	n/a		Marvin Beck
1975–76	SSC	19–12	n/a	n/a	NAIA Tournament	Marvin Beck
No team from 1976 to 1993
1993–94	SSC	11–16	n/a	n/a		Don Hagan
1994–95	GSC	17–11	6–8	4th East (7th Overall)	NAIA Tournament	Don Hagan
1995–96	GSC	15–15	8–6	4th East (8th Overall)	NAIA Tournament	Don Hagan
1996–97	GSC	13–13	6–8	5th East (9th Overall)		Don Hagan
1997–98	GSC	20–8	9–5	T–2nd East (4th Overall)	GSC Tournament	Don Hagan
1998–99	GSC	16–11	7–7	4th East (T–7th Overall)	GSC Tournament	Don Hagan
1999–2000	GSC	18–10	9–5	T–2nd East (T–5th Overall)	GSC Tournament	Don Hagan
2000–01	GSC	18–9	8–6	T–3rd East (T–8th Overall)	GSC Tournament	Don Hagan
2001–02	GSC	16–12	8–8	T–3rd East (T–5th Overall)	GSC Tournament	Don Hagan
2002–03	GSC	16–11	6–8	6th East (11th Overall)		Don Hagan
2003–04	GSC	17–11	8–6	4th East (8th Overall)	GSC Tournament	Don Hagan
2004–05	GSC	12–15	4–10	7th East (14th Overall)		Don Hagan
2005–06	GSC	14–13	3–11	8th East (15th Overall)		Don Hagan
2006–07	GSC	10–17	2–10	7th East (14th Overall)		Don Hagan
2007–08	GSC	13–14	3–9	T–6th East (T–12th Overall)		Don Hagan
2008–09	GSC	13–12	5–7	T–4th East (7th Overall)		Don Hagan
2009–10	GSC	11–14	2–8	6th East (T–10th Overall)		Bob Stinnett
2010–11	GSC	9–17	2–10	6th East (13th Overall)		Bob Stinnett
2011–12	GSC	19–11	8–6	T–3rd	GSC Tournament	Bob Stinnett
2012–13	GSC	13–15	7–11	T–5th	GSC Tournament	Bob Stinnett
2013–14	GSC	7–20	6–14	8th	GSC Tournament	Bob Stinnett
2014–15	GSC	7–21	3–19	10th		Bob Stinnett
2015–16	GSC	7–19	5–17	12th		Jeff Burkhamer
2016–17	GSC	20–9	14–8	T–4th	GSC Tournament	Jeff Burkhamer
2017–18	GSC	28–4	17–3	2nd	GSC Tournament Champs; NCAA D-II Tournament (South Quarterfinal)	Jeff Burkhamer
2018–19	GSC	12–16	8–12	9th		Jeff Burkhamer
2019–20	GSC	14–14	11–9	6th	GSC Tournament	Jeff Burkhamer
2020–21	GSC	7–12	7–12	5th East (8th Overall)		Jeff Burkhamer
2021–22	GSC	18–11	11–9	6th	GSC Tournament	Jeff Burkhamer
2022–23	GSC	13–15	9–15	9th		Jeff Burkhamer
2023–24	GSC	2–1; 6–19 (8–20)	0–0; 6–18 (6–18)	n/a 12th (12th)		Jeff Burkhamer; Justin Mann (Total)
2024–25	GSC	8–20	7–15	11th		Justin Mann
2025–26	GSC	25–9	15–7	3rd	GSC Tournament Champs; NCAA D-II Tournament (First Round)	Justin Mann
2026–27	A-Sun	0–0	0–0	n/a	?	Tanner Smith
42 Seasons	-	588–549	216–297	-	-	-

== Postseason ==
=== NCAA Division II tournament ===
The Argonauts appeared in the NCAA Division II tournament two times. Their combined record was 0–2.

Year	Round	Opponent	Result
2018	First Round	Barry	L, 73–90
2026	First Round	West Alabama	L, 53–58

=== NAIA tournament ===
The Argonauts appeared in the NAIA tournament one time. Their record was 0–1.

Year	Round	Opponent	Result
1976	First Round	Texas Southern	L, 59–81

== See also ==
- West Florida Argonauts women's basketball
