= Drew Henderson =

American-Dutch basketball player and coach

Personal information
- Born: March 19, 1971 (age 55) New York City, New York, U.S.
- Listed height: 6 ft 7 in (2.01 m)

Career information
- High school: McQuaid Jesuit (Rochester, New York)
- College: Fairfield (1989–1993)
- NBA draft: 1993: undrafted
- Position: Forward

Career history
- 1993–1994: Donar Groningen
- 1994–1995: Finland, France
- 1995–1997: Assist Assen
- 1997–1999: Virtus Werkendam
- 1999–2000: Brother Gent
- 2000–2001: Landstede Basketbal, Spain
- 2001–2002: Portugal

Career highlights
- 3× Eredivisie rebounding leader (1997–1999); 2× First-team All-MAAC (1992, 1993); All-MAAC Freshmen Team (1990)

Drew Henderson (born March 19, 1971) is an American-Dutch former professional basketball player and coach and a current university administrator. He has played and coached internationally. Henderson has also been a member of the Dutch national basketball team.

== Early life ==
Henderson was born in New York. A 6'7", multi-sport athlete as a child, he excelled at basketball, football, and boxing. At age 15, Henderson moved to Rochester, New York and attended McQuaid Jesuit High School, where he played basketball and won a state championship his junior year. He then earned a basketball scholarship to Fairfield University in Fairfield, Connecticut.

== College career ==
After his freshman year at Fairfield, Henderson was chosen as a member of the All-Freshman Team of the Metro Atlantic Athletic Conference (MAAC). Henderson led the MAAC in rebounding during his junior and senior seasons (1992, 1993) and was in the top 10 of the country in this category in both seasons. He was also chosen to the all-MAAC first team during these seasons. He became the first player in Fairfield history to compile over 1,500 points, 1,000 rebounds, and 100 blocked shots. Henderson set school's rebounding record at the school at 1,080. He also set the record for most assists in a single game with 20. In 2017, Henderson was inducted into the Fairfield University Hall of Fame.

== Professional career ==
Henderson began his professional career in the USBL after being drafted in the first round and being coached by NBA Hall of Fame member Nate "Tiny" Archibald. This led to a 10-day contract with the Boston Celtics in 1994, although he never appeared in a regular season NBA game.

After this, Drew went on to Europe and played professionally in seven countries over an 11-year career. He led the Eredivisie in rebounding for three consecutive seasons.

== National team career ==
On November 19, 2000, Henderson played one game for the Netherlands national basketball team in a friendly game against Belgium, after being selected by coach Maarten van Gent.

== Personal life ==
Henderson transferred to the field of higher education upon retiring from basketball, which was caused by a car accident that injured his knee. He became a university professor, administrator and English teacher in the Netherlands. Henderson earned his master's degree in the Netherlands during his basketball career.

== See also ==
- List of NCAA Division I men's basketball players with 20 or more assists in a game
