= Ross Bekkering =

Canadian-Dutch basketball player

Personal information
- Born: August 19, 1987 (age 39) Taber, Alberta
- Listed height: 2.04 m (6 ft 8 in)

Career information
- High school: W. R. Myers (Taber, Alberta)
- College: Calgary (2005–2010)
- NBA draft: 2010: undrafted
- Playing career: 2010–2016
- Position: Power forward / center
- Number: 12

Career history
- 2010–2011: ZZ Leiden
- 2011–2012: Matrixx Magixx
- 2012–2013: ZZ Leiden
- 2013–2016: Donar

Career highlights
- 4× DBL champion (2011, 2013, 2014, 2016); 2× Dutch Supercup champion (2011, 2014); 2× All-DBL Team (2013, 2016); 2× DBL All-Defense Team (2014, 2016); DBL rebounding leader (2016); DBL Statistical Player of the Year (2016); 5× DBL All-Star (2011, 2013–2016)

Ross Bekkering (born August 19, 1987) is a Canadian-Dutch former professional basketball player. Bekkering played in the Dutch Basketball League. Bekkering is the younger brother of Henry Bekkering, who was a professional basketball player as well.

He played collegiately for Calgary, where he played five years. In 2010, he started his professional career in the Netherlands with ZZ Leiden, winning the Dutch Basketball League in his rookie year. The following year, he signed with Matrixx Magixx. After one year he returned to Leiden, where he won another DBL title in 2013. Afterwards, he played three years with league rival Donar, where he added two more championships. He retired in 2016.

Four years after his retirement, in 2020, Bekkering played 3x3 basketball for the Netherlands national team. He represented the country at the 2020 Olympics in Tokyo.

== Professional career ==
Bekkering started his professional career with Zorg en Zekerheid Leiden in 2010. With Leiden Bekkering won the Dutch championship. The following season Bekkering left for Matrixx Magixx to team up with his older brother Henry Bekkering. After a year with Magixx Bekkering signed again with Leiden, and in his second season he won the championship once again.

On June 10, 2013, Bekkering signed with the GasTerra Flames from Groningen along with Leiden teammate Arvin Slagter. Bekkering won his first NBB Cup with Flames, by beating his former team Leiden 79–71 in the Final. After the DBL regular season Bekkering was selected in the DBL All-Defense Team. He extended his contract with one year in July 2014.

On June 23, 2016, Bekkering announced his retirement at age 28.

== 3x3 basketball ==
In 2021, Bekkering joined the Netherlands national 3x3 team. He played at the 2020 Summer Olympics in Tokyo, where the team finished in the fifth place.

== Honours ==
=== Professionally ===
- 4x Dutch Championship (2011, 2013, 2014, 2016)
- 2x NBB Cup (2014,2015)
- 2x Dutch Supercup (2011, 2014)

Individual awards

- 2x All-DBL Team (2013, 2016)
- 5x All-Star (2011, 2013, 2014, 2015, 2016)
- 2x DBL All-Defense Team (2014, 2016)
- DBL rebounding leader (2015–2016)
- DBL Statistical Player of the Year (2015–2016)
- Eurobasket.com Player of the Year (2015–2016)

=== College ===
Calgary

- 2x All-Canada West Team (2009, 2010)
- 2x All-Canadian Team (2009, 2010)

== Statistics ==
Legend
GP	Games played	MPG	Minutes per game	FG%	Field goal percentage
3P%	3-point field goal percentage	FT%	Free throw percentage	RPG	Rebounds per game
APG	Assists per game	SPG	Steals per game	BPG	Blocks per game
PPG	Points per game	**Bold**	Career high		Led the league

=== DBL ===
Year	Team	GP	GS	MPG	FG%	3P%	FT%	RPG	APG	SPG	BPG	PPG
2010–11	ZZ Leiden	**48** (Note: Including Playoff games.)		24.1	.568	.267	**.693**	5.5	0.9	0.6	0.6	11.1
2011–12	Magixx	19		26.1	.520	.396	.637	6.8	1.1	0.8	0.9	11.4
2012–13	ZZ Leiden	46		26.2	.550	.259	.580	8.3	1.2	0.6	0.7	12.0
2013–14	Donar	35		22.8	**.622**	.364	.586	5.9	1.5	1	0.4	8.8
2014–15	Donar	15		25.1	.622	.368	.609	6.4	2.4	1.3	0.3	11.4
2015–16	Donar	28		**29.7**	.607	**.500**	.650	**10.5**	**2.5**	**1.2**	**1.0**	**13.5**
