= Univé =

Insurance company

- Company type: Cooperative
- Industry: Insurance
- Predecessor: DLG te Assen and NOVO te Zwolle
- Founded: 1794; 231 years ago
- Headquarters: Arnhem, Netherlands
- Area served: Netherlands
- Products: Insurance, mortgages, investments
- Number of employees: 2,700 (2021)
- Website: www.unive.nl

Univé is a Dutch cooperative insurance company based in the cities of Assen and Zwolle. Univé presents itself as a nonprofit insurer claiming that therefore it has cheaper products.

== History ==
Univé is the result of many mergers. The present company was founded in 1991 by the merger of DLG (Assen) and Novo (Zwolle). A year later health insurer Ziekenfonds Noord-Holland Noord from Alkmaar joined Unive, which has since dissolved again

The affiliated mutuals have a much longer history. The oldest existing mutual (mutual insurance Unive North Groningen BA) was founded in 1794 by Geert Reinders.

Since 1996, Univé has had a website presence on the Internet. In 1997 the first online insurance (a moped policy) was sold.

== Structure ==
Univé is a cooperative association of 26 member cooperatives. These regional cooperatives have about 150 outlets in the Netherlands.

The central Univé organization consists of two large insurance companies, namely a life insurer, based in Assen and a health insurer in Alkmaar. The headquarters of the central organization is in Arnhem.

The regional cooperatives are themselves mutual insurance, which operate regionally. Each of these mutuals is in itself a provider of fire and storm insurances, and acts as an intermediary for the central insurance. The regional offices also sell other financial products such as life insurance and mortgages. Because the stated goal of the association is to provide the best possible services for the members (policyholders), the mutuals also offer other financial services products.

Both the central organization as the mutuals have each their own separate executive boards.

There are several affiliated organizations and companies.

- Compander is an expertise company that performs expert reports, in particular for fire and car damage. This company is 100% owned by Univé.
- The Stichting Univé Rechtshulp (Univé juridical assistance foundation) was established as an implementing agency for legal expenses insurance. It is owned by Univé.

As of 2006, Univé had about 3,100 employees, about half of them employed by the mutuals.

In May 2006, a collaboration with health insurer VGZ-IZA-Triassic was announced. The merger has been approved by the NMa and De Nederlandsche Bank and is effective as of January 1, 2007. The name of the insurer became Univé-VGZ-IZA-Trias.

== Criticism ==
The television program Zembla and TROS Radar paid attention the way Univé uses the agency's own damages expert Compander, which would not operate independently. Because of this insured would be disadvantaged.

On July 25, 2012 the ICT magazine Webwereld published information, in which Univé confirmed that they tried to delete negative information on Wikipedia and included their company's slogan, although this is strictly against Wikipedia guidelines which prohibit using Wikipedia for commercial purposes. However, an Univé spokesperson declared that it was their task to maintain their Wikipedia page. It is unknown if Univé's statement was made out of ignorance of the Wikipedia guidelines, or if they believe that they are not bound by these guidelines which have to be accepted when using Wikipedia.

== Community involvement ==
In their capacity as damages insurer's Unive is involved in various initiatives aimed at limiting damages and their consequences as a sponsor, for example Veilig Verkeer Nederland (Safe traffic Netherlands) and Slachtofferhulp Nederland (Victim support Netherlands).

== Sponsorships ==
Univé is nationally known as a sponsor of:

- Until late 2009 sponsor of the National Youth Orchestra of the Netherlands.
- Football Club SC Heerenveen
- Basketball club Aris Leeuwarden
- Skate Bond Nederland
- Univé Schaaktoernooi

Univé also sponsors the Unive Gym Gala and was involved in the 2005 FIFA World Youth Championship organized in the Netherlands.

The name of Univé is attached to the Univé Stadium of first division football club FC Emmen. The regional mutuals also independently sponsors a number of sporting and cultural events in their own region.
