= Patrick Hilliman =

Dutch retired basketball player (born 1982)

Personal information
- Born: 17 April 1982 (age 44) Sint Maarten
- Listed height: 2.08 m (6 ft 10 in)
- Listed weight: 220 lb (100 kg)

Career information
- College: Livingstone (2001–2002); College of Central Florida (2002–2003); High Point (2003–2005)
- NBA draft: 2005: undrafted
- Playing career: 2005–2014
- Position: Power forward / center
- Number: 14

Career history
- 2005–2006: Torrevieja
- 2006–2007: Alaior Opel Jovent
- 2007–2008: Clavijo
- 2008–2009: Promobys Valle de Almanzora
- 2009–2011: Rotterdam Challengers
- 2011–2013: ZZ Leiden
- 2013–2014: Sint-Jan
- 2014: Den Helder Kings

Career highlights
- 2x Dutch League champion (2011, 2013); Dutch Cup champion (2012); 2x Dutch Supercup champion (2011–2012); 2x DBL All-Star (2010, 2012); DBL rebounding leader (2010)

Patrick Silvester Hilliman (born 17 April 1982) is a Dutch retired basketball player. In his career, Hilliman played for Dutch Basketball League (DBL) clubs Rotterdam Challengers and ZZ Leiden. Between 2007 and 2011, Hilliman played 30 games for the Dutch national basketball team.

== Career ==
From 2005 to 2009, Patrick played in Spain for several teams in the lower divisions of the country.

In 2009, Hilliman left Spain for Holland to go play for the Rotterdam Challengers. Hilliman had an impressive debut season in the DBL, as he averaged 13.6 points and a league-leading 10.2 rebounds per game. Midway through the 2010–11 season Hilliman made a transfer to Zorg en Zekerheid Leiden, after also Groningen and Den Bosch were looking to acquire him.

During his time with Leiden, Hilliman won two DBL championships, an NBB Cup and two Supercups. He was also named a DBL All-Star again in 2011–12.

For the 2013–14 season, Hilliman took his talents to Belgium, where he began playing for Sint-Jan Basket in the Belgian Second Division. Eurobasket.com named him the Defensive Player of the Year and selected him for the All-Tweede Nationale Team.

For the 2014–15 season Hilliman returned to Holland, when he signed with Port of Den Helder Kings. In December 2014, Den Helder Kings was declared bankrupt and was dissolved.

Hilliman played three more years at amateur level in Belgium with Basics Melsese.

== Honours ==
=== Club ===
(Netherlands) Zorg en Zekerheid Leiden

- Dutch Basketball League (2): 2010–11, 2012–13
- NBB Cup (1): 2011–12
- Dutch Supercup (2): 2011, 2012

=== Individual ===
(Netherlands) Rotterdam Challengers

- DBL rebounding leader (1): 2009–10
- DBL All-Star (1): 2010

(Netherlands) Zorg en Zekerheid Leiden

- DBL All-Star (1): 2012
