= Kenneth van Kempen =

Dutch basketball player

Personal information
- Born: 7 April 1987 (age 39) Weert, Netherlands
- Listed height: 2.08 m (6 ft 10 in)

Career information
- College: Ohio (2006–2010)
- NBA draft: 2010: undrafted
- Playing career: 2004–2017
- Position: Center

Career history
- 2004–2006: BSW
- 2010–2016: BSW
- 2016–2017: Soba Antwerpen

Career highlights
- 2× DBL rebounding leader (2014, 2015); 2× DBL All-Star (2013, 2014)

Kenneth van Kempen (born 7 April 1987) is a Dutch retired basketball player. Standing at 2.08 m (6 ft 10 in), Van Kempen played as center. He spent four years playing college basketball with Ohio. Van Kempen also spent eight years of his career with BSW, a professional DBL club based in his hometown Weert.

== Honours ==
=== Professional career ===
BSW

- DBL All-Star (2): 2013, 2014
- DBL rebounding leader (2): 2014, 2015

=== College career ===
Ohio

- MAC Champion: 2010
