= Rein van der Kamp =

Dutch basketball player and coach

Personal information
- Born: 16 July 1979 (age 47) Meppel, Netherlands
- Listed height: 2.02 m (6 ft 8 in)

Career information
- Playing career: 2001–2011
- Position: Small forward
- Number: 9
- Coaching career: 2011–2012

Career history

Playing
- 2001–2005: Landstede Zwolle
- 2005–2007: Den Bosch
- 2007–2010: Aris Leeuwarden
- 2010–2011: Landstede Zwolle

Coaching
- 2011–2012: Landstede Zwolle (assistant)

Career highlights
- As player: 2x Dutch Championship (2006, 2007); All-DBL Team (2009)

Rein van der Kamp (born 17 July 1979) is a Dutch former professional basketball player. In his career, Van der Kamp played for Dutch Basketball League teams Landstede Basketbal, EiffelTowers Den Bosch and De Friesland Aris.
