= Andy Gardiner (basketball) =

British professional basketball player

Personal information
- Born: 29 November 1967 (age 58) Walthamstow, England
- Listed height: 6 ft 6 in (1.98 m)
- Position: Small forward

Career history
- 1986–1989: Bracknell Pirates/Tigers
- 1989–1993: Hawaii Loa College
- 1993–1994: Hawaii Pacific University
- 1993–1995: Derby Bucks
- 1995–1996: London Towers
- 1996–1997: Basket Willebroek
- 1997–2002: BT Holstra Wevelgem
- 2002–2003: Euphony Liège
- 2003–2004: Brighton Bears

Career highlights
- BBL League Winner 1985-86; National Cup Runner Up 1988-89; BBL Trophy Runner Up 1989-90; BBL All-Star 1991-92, 1989-90, 1988-89

Andy Derek Gardiner (born November 29, 1967) is a retired British professional basketball player.

== Playing career ==
Gardiner played for the Bracknell Pirates and Bracknell Tigers before enrolling at Hawaii Loa College, which merged with the Hawaii Pacific University during his college career.

While playing for the London Towers, Gardiner gained additional international experience, participating in the 1995–96 Korać-Cup.

Gardiner played in Belgium from 1996 to 2003. In 2002–03, he competed in the FIBA Europe Champions Cup with Euphony Liège. In 2003, he joined the Brighton Bears, coached by Nick Nurse. Gardiner won 26 caps for the English men's basketball national team.

Gardiner's daughter Timea followed in the footsteps of her father, embarking on a basketball career.
