= Timea Gardiner =

British-American basketball player

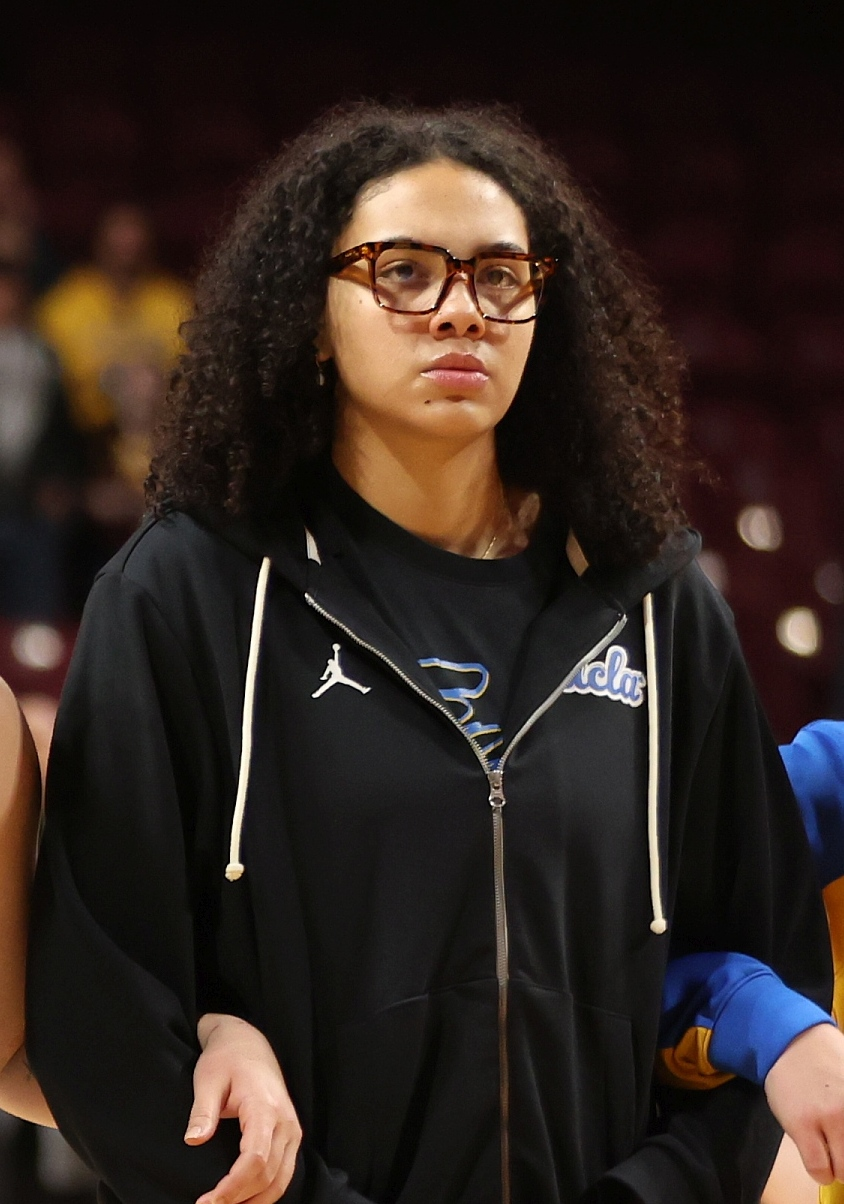
- Gardiner in 2026

No. 30 – UCLA Bruins
- Position: Forward
- League: Big Ten Conference

Personal information
- Born: October 22, 2003 (age 23) Brighton, England
- Listed height: 6 ft 3 in (1.91 m)

Career information
- High school: Fremont (Plain City, Utah, U.S.)
- College: Oregon State (2022–2024); UCLA (2024–present)

Career highlights
- NCAA champion (2026); All-Pac-12 – Coaches (2024); Pac-12 Sixth Player of the Year (2024); McDonald's All-American (2022)
Medals
Women's basketball
Representing the United States
FIBA Americas Under-16 Championship
Gold medal – first place	2019 Chile	Team

Timea Gardiner (born October 22, 2003) is a British-American college basketball player for the UCLA Bruins of the Big Ten Conference. She previously played for the Oregon State Beavers.

== Early life and high school career ==
Gardiner was born in England, where her father was playing professional basketball. She played basketball for Fremont High School in Plain City, Utah. As a senior, Gardiner was selected to play in the McDonald's All-American Game. Rated a five-star recruit and the number 6 player in the 2022 class by ESPN, she committed to play college basketball for Oregon State over offers from Stanford and UCLA. She became the highest-ranked recruit to ever sign with the program.

== College career ==
Before her freshman season at Oregon State, Gardiner crashed her scooter while riding around campus, leading to a minor injury and a CT scan that revealed blood clots in her lungs. After being sidelined for the first half of the season, she averaged 8.7 points and 3.5 rebounds per game, earning Pac-12 All-Freshman honorable mention. As a sophomore, Gardiner averaged 11.6 points and 7 rebounds per game, helping her team reach the Elite Eight of the 2024 NCAA tournament. She was named Pac-12 Sixth Player of the Year and was selected to the coaches' all-conference team. For her junior season, Gardiner transferred to UCLA.

In the 2024–25 season, Gardiner largely came off the bench but was a key perimeter shooter for the Bruins as she led the team in 3-point field goal percentage. The 2024–25 UCLA Bruins women's basketball team went on to win the Big Ten Tournament. She scored 15 points in the Elite Eight against LSU and helped lead UCLA to their first-ever Final Four. In the Final Four, they would go on to lose to the eventual national champion UConn Huskies 85–51.

Midway through the 2025–26 season, Gardiner, who had been dealing with a knee injury that had sidelined her for the first half of the season, announced she would miss the rest of the season to rehabilitate her injury and stated that she would be returning to play in the 2026–27 season. She was on the sideline for the 2025–26 UCLA Bruins women's basketball team won the National Championship.

Gardiner entered the starting lineup of the 2026–27 UCLA Bruins women's basketball team. Against Cal Poly San Luis Obispo on November 19, 2026, Gardiner set a UCLA record with 9 made 3-point field goals and scored 29 total points.

== National team career ==
Gardiner played for the United States at the 2019 FIBA Under-16 Americas Championship in Chile. She averaged 7 points and 6.5 rebounds per game, helping her team win the gold medal.

== Personal life ==
Gardiner is a dual citizen of the United Kingdom and the United States. Her father, Andy, is a native of England and played basketball for Hawaii Pacific and professionally in England and Belgium. Gardiner's mother, Cory, played volleyball for Hawaii Pacific.

== Career statistics ==
Legend
GP	Games played	GS	Games started	MPG	Minutes per game	RPG	Rebounds per game
APG	Assists per game	SPG	Steals per game	BPG	Blocks per game	PPG	Points per game
TO	Turnovers per game	FG%	Field-goal percentage	3P%	3-point field-goal percentage	FT%	Free-throw percentage
**Bold**	Career best	°	League leader

=== College ===
Year	Team	GP	GS	MPG	FG%	3P%	FT%	RPG	APG	SPG	BPG	TO	PPG
2022–23	Oregon State	15	2	20.2	**47.7**	36.2	73.3	3.5	0.9	**0.4**	0.3	1.5	8.7
2023–24	Oregon State	35	**9**	**26.7**	44.5	**39.5**	**88.5**	**7.0**	**1.4**	0.2	**0.5**	1.6	**11.6**
2024–25	UCLA	**36**	6	18.3	41.8	**39.5**	84.0	3.4	1.0	0.3	0.3	**1.0**	7.6
**Career**		86	17	22.0	44.1	39.1	85.1	4.9	1.1	0.3	0.4	1.3	9.4
Statistics retrieved from Sports-Reference.
