= Tjoe de Paula =

Dutch-Dominican basketball player

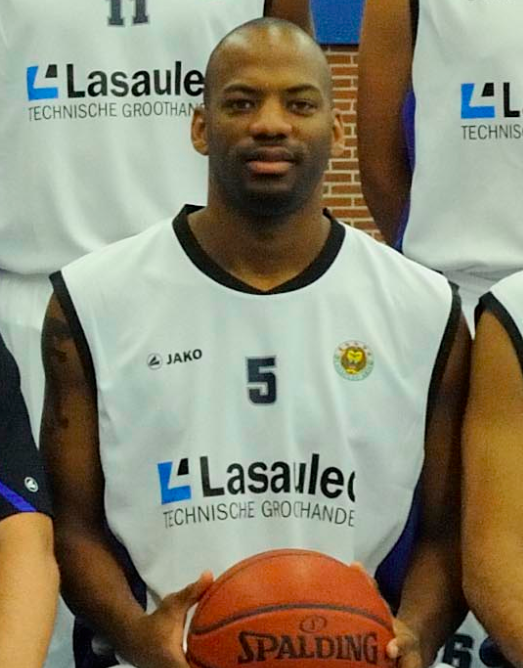
- De Paula in 2011 for Aris Leeuwarden

Personal information
- Born: 15 February 1981 (age 45) Santo Domingo, Dominican Republic
- Listed height: 1.85 m (6 ft 1 in)

Career information
- Playing career: 2001–2018
- Position: Shooting guard
- Number: 5

Career history
- 2001–2003: Noordkop Den Helder
- 2003–2004: Donar
- 2004–2005: Den Helder Seals
- 2005–2006: Atomia Brussels
- 2006–2008: Omniworld Almere
- 2008–2009: Den Helder Seals
- 2010: Gregorio
- 2010–2015: Aris Leeuwarden
- 2016–2017: Donar
- 2017–2018: Den Helder Suns

Career highlights
- No. 5 retired by Den Helder Suns; 2x Dutch League champion (2016–2017); Dutch Cup champion (2017); Dutch Supercup champion (2016); DBL Rookie of the Year (2002)

Tjoe de Paula (born 15 February 1982) is a Dutch-Dominican retired basketball player. Standing at 1.85 m (6 ft 1 in), de Paula played as shooting guard.

== Professional career ==
De Paula started his professional career with Noordkop Den Helder in 2001.

In 2010, De Paula signed with Aris Leeuwarden, where he would play for five seasons. In the 2014–15 season, he averaged 17 points per game. On 1 February 2015, De Paula scored a career-high 30 points in a 87–73 win against Rotterdam.

On 30 July 2017, De Paula signed with Den Helder Suns, newcomer in the Dutch Basketball League (DBL). After the 2017–18 season, De Paula retired. His jersey number 5 was retired by Den Helder.
