= Sint-Jan Basket =

- Nickname: Jannetjes
- Dissolved: 2014
- Arena: Sporthal Linkeroever
- Location: Antwerp, Belgium
- Team colors: Blue, Yellow
- President: Patrick Frederickx

Sint-Jan Basket was a Belgian basketball team based in Antwerp. The team played in the Tweede Nationale, the second division in Belgium. In 2014, Sint-Jan merged with Mercurius BBC.

== Notable players ==
Note: Flags indicate national team eligibility at FIBA-sanctioned events. Players may hold other non-FIBA nationalities not displayed.

Criteria

To appear in this section a player must have either:

- Set a club record or won an individual award while at the club
- Played at least one official international match for their national team at any time
- Played at least one official NBA match at any time.

- (Netherlands) Patrick Hilliman
  (1 season: 2013–14)
