= Stefan Wessels (basketball) =

Dutch basketball player

Heroes Den Bosch
- Title: General manager
- League: BNXT League

Personal information
- Born: 13 April 1984 (age 42) Haarlem, Netherlands
- Listed height: 2.03 m (6 ft 8 in)
- Listed weight: 100 kg (220 lb)

Career information
- NBA draft: 2006: undrafted
- Playing career: 2004–2021
- Position: Power forward / small forward
- Number: 7

Career history
- 2004–2009: Amsterdam
- 2009–2021: Heroes Den Bosch

Career highlights
- 5× DBL champion (2005, 2008, 2009, 2012, 2015); 3× Dutch Cup champion (2006, 2013, 2016); All-DBL Team (2013); 8× DBL All-Star (2010–2017); DBL All-Star Game MVP (2013); 3× DBL All-Defense Team (2014, 2016, 2018)

Stefan Wessels (born 13 April 1984) is a Dutch retired basketball player. He is the current General Manager of Heroes Den Bosch. In his playing career, Wessels has played for ABC Amsterdam and Heroes Den Bosch. Wessels also presented the Dutch national basketball team on various tournaments.

== Professional career ==
Wessels started his professional career in 2004, with the Amsterdam Astronauts of the Dutch top-tier Eredivisie. He was a member of the 2005, 2008 and 2009 championship teams. He also made his appearances in European competitions, as Amsterdam played in the Eurocup and EuroChallenge throughout the years.

In 2009, Wessels transferred to EiffelTowers Den Bosch. Here, he won his fourth championship in the 2011–12 season. Wessels was a key part of Den Bosch' team, as he was named to eight straight DBL All-Star teams from 2009 until 2017. In 2017, he won his fifth Dutch championship with Den Bosch, which played as "SPM Shoeters" due to sponsorship reasons.

On 7 July 2021, Wessels retired from playing basketball and was hired as General Manager for Heroes Den Bosch.
