= Kalverdijkje =

Indoor sports complex in Leeuwarden, Netherlands

- Interactive map of Kalverdijkje
- Address: Kalverdijkje 77A
- Location: Leeuwarden, Netherlands
- Coordinates: 53°12′43.1″N 5°49′33.8″E
- Owner: Municipality-owned
- Operator: BV Sport
- Capacity: 1,700
- Type: Indoor hall Swimming pool

Construction
- Expanded: 2014

Tenant
- Aris Leeuwarden (2004–present)

The Kalverdijkje is an indoor sports complex in Leeuwarden, Netherlands. The complex has a swimming pool, and hosts basketball, volleyball and korfball matches. It is also the home arena of Aris Leeuwarden, professional basketball club competing in the Dutch Basketball League.

The Kalverdijkje has two halls: the Egelantierhal and the Schieringenhal. The latter, which is the primary venue, has a seating capacity of 1,700 people following its expansion in 2014. Prior to this, it could accommodate 1,000 spectators. Aris Leeuwarden hosts its home games in this hall.

On 29 September 2017, the Kalverdijkje hosted a Basketball Champions League qualifying game, in which Donar played against CB Estudiantes.

== Sporting events ==
Dates	Event	Sport
5–15 January	1989 FIFA Futsal World Championship	Futsal
15–23 May	2013 DBL Finals	Basketball
