= Robbie Sihota =

Canadian-Indian basketball player

Personal information
- Born: October 18, 1987 (age 39) Calgary, Alberta
- Listed height: 6 ft 6 in (1.98 m)
- Listed weight: 225 lb (102 kg)

Career information
- High school: Lester B. Pearson (Calgary, Alberta)
- College: Calgary (2006–2010)
- NBA draft: 2010: undrafted
- Playing career: 2010–2017
- Position: Power forward

Career history
- 2010–2011: Rotterdam Basketbal College
- 2011: US Hiefenech
- 2011: Calgary Crush
- 2012: Edmonton Energy
- 2012–2014: Matrixx Magixx
- 2014–2015: Fribourg Olympic
- 2015–2016: MAFC
- 2016: Eisbären Bremerhaven
- 2016–2017: MAFC

Career highlights
- DBL rebounding leader (2011); Canada West Second-Team All-Star (2010)

Rajvarinder Singh Sihota (born October 18, 1987) is a Canadian-Indian retired basketball player. Sihota played at the power forward position.

== Professional career ==
On February 25, 2016, Sihota signed with Eisbären Bremerhaven.

== Honours ==
- DBL rebounding leader (1): 2010–11
