= Whit Holcomb-Faye =

American basketball player

Personal information
- Born: September 19, 1984 (age 42) Winston-Salem, North Carolina, U.S.
- Listed height: 1.85 m (6 ft 1 in)

Career information
- High school: R.J. Reynolds High School (Winston-Salem, North Carolina)
- College: Radford (2002–2006)
- NBA draft: 2006: undrafted
- Playing career: 2006–2016
- Position: Point guard

Career history
- 2006–2008: 1. FC Kaiserslautern
- 2008–2009: Bayreuth
- 2009–2010: Saar-Pfalz Braves
- 2010–2011: Tigers Tübingen
- 2011: WBC Wels
- 2011–2012: Mitteldeutscher BC
- 2012–2013: Aris Leeuwarden
- 2013–2014: Leiden
- 2014–2016: Wolves Verviers-Pepinster

Career highlights
- ProA champion (2012); DBL assists leader (2013); DBL All-Star (2013)

Robert "Whit" Holcomb-Faye (born September 19, 1984) is an American former professional basketball player. Holcomb-Faye played ten seasons as a professional player in several other hemispheres.

== Career ==
Holcomb-Faye played for multiple German teams from the 2. Basketball Bundesliga and one team from Austria before signing with Aris Leeuwarden in the summer of 2012. Holcomb-Faye was one of the main reasons the team reached the Dutch finals for the first time in its history, as he averaged 14.5 points and 5.6 assist per game in the play-offs. In the Finals Leeuwarden lost to ZZ Leiden, the team he would later sign with. For the 2014–15 season, he signed with VOO Wolves Verviers-Pepinster.

== Honours and titles ==
=== Club ===
Mitteldeutscher BC

- ProA: 2011–12

=== Individual ===
- DBL assists leader: 2012–13
- DBL All-Star: 2013
