= Andre Young (basketball) =

American basketball player (born 1990)

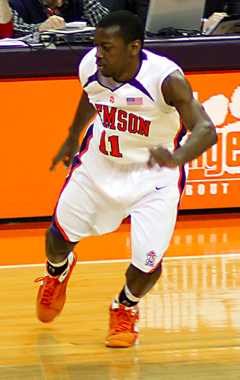
- Young playing for the Clemson Tigers in 2009

Personal information
- Born: March 16, 1990 (age 36) Albany, Georgia, US
- Listed height: 5 ft 9 in (1.75 m)
- Listed weight: 170 lb (77 kg)

Career information
- High school: Deerfield-Windsor (Albany, Georgia)
- College: Clemson (2008–2012)
- NBA draft: 2012: undrafted
- Playing career: 2012–2015
- Position: Point guard
- Number: 11

Career history
- 2012–2013: EiffelTowers Den Bosch
- 2013–2014: Goverla
- 2014–2015: Chorale Roanne

Career highlights
- Dutch Cup champion (2013); DBL Most Valuable Player (2013); All-DBL Team (2013); DBL All-Star (2013); ACC All-Defensive team (2012)

Andre Young (born March 16, 1990) is an American former professional basketball player. Standing at 5 ft 9 in (1.75 m), Young played the point guard or shooting guard position. He played four years of collegiate basketball with Clemson followed by three seasons of playing professionally in multiple countries in Europe.

== Career ==
After playing college basketball for the Clemson Tigers, Young started his professional career in the Netherlands with EiffelTowers Den Bosch from the Dutch Basketball League. In his first season, he won the league's Most Valuable Player award and got a place in the All-DBL Team. With EiffelTowers, Young won the Dutch Cup. However, he did not win the national championship despite finishing first in the regular season.

On June 12, 2013, Young signed with BC Goverla in the Ukrainian Basketball SuperLeague. He left the team in March 2014 during the ongoing Ukrainian revolution.

For the 2014–15 season, Young signed with Chorale Roanne of the French second tier Pro B.

For the 2015–16 season, he signed with another Pro B side in Boulazac Basket Dordogne. On July 28, 2015, Young was released by Boulazac after suffering a serious injury.

== Honours ==
=== With club ===
EiffelTowers Den Bosch

- NBB Cup: 2012–13

=== Individual awards ===
- DBL Most Valuable Player: 2012–13
- All-DBL Team: 2012–13
- DBL All-Star: 2013
- DBL Three-Point shootout champion: 2013
- All-ACC Defensive Team: 2011–12
