= LWD Basket =

Coordinates: 53°12′43.1″N 5°49′33.8″E

- Founded: 2004; 22 years ago
- History: List: Woon! Aris (2004–2007) Aris Friesland (2007–2009) De Friesland Aris (2009–2011) Lasaulec Aris (2011–2012) Aris Leeuwarden (2012–2023) LWD Basket (2023–present)
- Arena: Kalverdijkje
- Capacity: 1,700
- Location: Leeuwarden, Netherlands
- Team colors: Yellow, Navy Blue
- Team manager: Gert Schurer
- Head coach: Vincent van Sliedregt
- Team captain: Reinder Brandsma
- 2025–26 position: BNXT League, 15th of 21
- Championships: 1 Promotiedivisie
- Website: lwdbasket.nl

LWD Basket is a Dutch professional basketball club based in Leeuwarden. Founded as Aris Leeuwarden in 2004 and has competed at the highest national level since its foundation. The team plays its home games at the Kalverdijkje.

The most notable successes are reaching the DBL finals in 2013 and the NBB Cup final in 2020.

== History ==
The parent club was actually founded in 1992, when the clubs Sporty and Ymir merged into BV Aris. In 2004 the professional team was founded, when the team promoted from the Promotiedivisie – the Dutch second-tier league – to the Eredivisie. The team, coached by Tom Simpson, was named Woon!Aris for sponsorship reasons and reached the Playoffs in its first season. After then, the team failed to reach the postseason for four seasons. In 2009–10, Aris, then named De Friesland Aris, reached the playoff semi-finals for the first time. Aris took its name from Aris Limassol a legendary cypriot team with 300 fans.

In the 2012–13 season, Aris was in financial trouble after it lost their main sponsor Lasaulec. Despite these circumstances Aris' squad – which included All-Stars Holcomb-Faye and Givens – reached the DBL Finals. Rival #1 seed Den Bosch was knocked out of the tournament 3–1 in the semi-finals. In the Finals Aris played ZZ Leiden and lost 0–4 to the #2 seed of the regular season.

Before the start of the 2013–14 Aris signed a new main sponsor in Univé, which guaranteed the existence of the team despite its ongoing financial struggles. The capacity of Kalverdijkje was also increased from 800 to 1,700 to further increase the stability for the club's future.

In the 2019–20 season, Aris reached the final of the Dutch Basketball Cup for the first time in history under head coach Ferried Naciri. The final, however, was never played as the season was cancelled due to the COVID-19 pandemic outbreak. The final, which was to be played against Donar, was cancelled as well after no new date could be found.

Since the 2021–22 season, Aris plays in the BNXT League, in which the national leagues of Belgium and the Netherlands have been merged. During the 2022–23 season, Aris reached the semi-finals for a third time in history.

At the end of the 2022–23 season, it was revealed that the club was in financial difficulties. The BNXT organisation denied the club’s first application for a licence. To resolve the issues, the stichting behind the club was resolved and a new club was founded in a besloten vennootschap by the three members of the board, Johan Meijer, Gert Schrurer and Paul de Jong. The new name of the phoenix club was decided to be LWD Basket, with LWD being an abbreviation for Leeuwarden. LWD Basket adopted new club colours, blue and yellow, which it lends from the flag of the city.

On the 26th of march 2026 the club announced it would not apply for a BNXT League license for the following year. The club stated it could not maintain the required financial and organizational level of the League. Despite being competitive in the last three years, the club was unable to obtain enough sponsors and a following which could support a club on this level.

== Honours ==
Dutch Basketball League

- Runners-up (1): 2012–13
- Semifinalists (2): 2009–10, 2022–23

Dutch Cup

- Finalist (1): 2019–20 (Note: Aris reached the final of the 2019–20 Dutch Basketball Cup against Donar. However, the season was cancelled due to the COVID-19 pandemic and the final was never played.)
- Semifinalist (4): 2012–13, 2013–14, 2015–16, 2021–22

Promotiedivisie

- Winners (1): 2003–04

== Season by season ==
Champions	Runners-up	Playoff berth

Season	Tier	League	Finish	Played	Wins	Losses	Win%	Dutch Playoffs	NBB Cup	BNXT Playoffs	Head coach
Aris Leeuwarden
2004–05	1	DBL	7th	20	11	9	.550	Lost quarterfinals (Den Bosch), 0–2		–	Tom Simpson
2005–06	1	DBL	10th	26	5	21	.192	–		–	Tom Simpson
2006–07	1	DBL	9th	40	14	26	.350	–		–	Andre Roorda
2007–08	1	DBL	10th	40	8	32	.200	–		–	Tony van den Bosch
2008–09	1	DBL	10th	40	12	28	.300	–		–	Pete Miller
2009–10	1	DBL	6th	36	19	17	.528	Won quarterfinals (Den Bosch), 2–0; Lost semifinals (West-Brabant Giants), 1–3	Fourth round	–	Pete Miller
2010–11	1	DBL	5th	36	17	19	.472	Lost quarterfinals (Magixx), 1–2	Quarterfinalist	–	Pete Miller
2011–12	1	DBL	6th	28	10	18	.370	Lost group stage quarterfinals	Fourth round	–	Erik Braal
2012–13	1	DBL	4th	36	20	16	.556	Won quarterfinals (Landstede), 3–0; Won semifinals (Den Bosch), 3–1; Lost finals (ZZ Leiden), 0–4	Semifinalist	–	Erik Braal
2013–14	1	DBL	6th	36	13	23	.361	Lost quarterfinals (SPM Shoeters), 0–2	Semifinalist	–	Ed Molthoff
2014–15	1	DBL	6th	28	8	20	.286	Lost quarterfinals (Donar), 0–2	Quarterfinalist	–	Tom Simpson
2015–16	1	DBL	7th	28	9	19	.321	–	Semifinals	–	Michael Schuurs; Klaas Stoppels (a.i.)
2016–17	1	DBL	7th	28	8	20	.286	–	Quarterfinals	–	Klaas Stoppels
2017–18	1	DBL	6th	32	10	22	.313	Lost quarterfinals (ZZ Leiden), 1–2	Quarterfinals	–	Tony van den Bosch
2018–19	1	DBL	7th	34	9	25	.265	Lost quarterfinals (Landstede), 0–2	Fourth round	–	Tony van den Bosch; Anne van Dijk (a.i.)
2019–20	1	DBL	8th	24	7	17	.292	Cancelled	Runners-up	–	Ferried Naciri
2020–21	1	DBL	11th	21	4	17	.190	–	First Round	–	Ferried Naciri
2021–22	1	BNXT League	14th	30	14	16	.467	Lost quarterfinals (Donar), 1–2	Semifinals	Lost second round (Okapi), 128–161	Vincent van Sliedregt
2022–23	1	BNXT League	10th	28	11	17	.393	Won quarterfinals (Landstede), 2–1 Lost semifinals (ZZ Leiden)	Quarterfinals	Lost third round (Spirou), 149–177	Vincent van Sliedregt
LWD Basket
2023–24	1	BNXT League	17th	28	8	20	.400	Lost quarterfinals (Landstede), 0–2	Quarterfinals	–	Vincent van Sliedregt
2024–25	1	BNXT League	10th	36	20	16	.556	Lost semifinals (Leiden), 2–3	Quarterfinals	–	Vincent van Sliedregt
2025–26	1	BNXT League	15th	34	10	24	.294	Lost quarterfinals (Leiden), 1–2	Quarterfinals	–	Vincent van Sliedregt

== Players ==
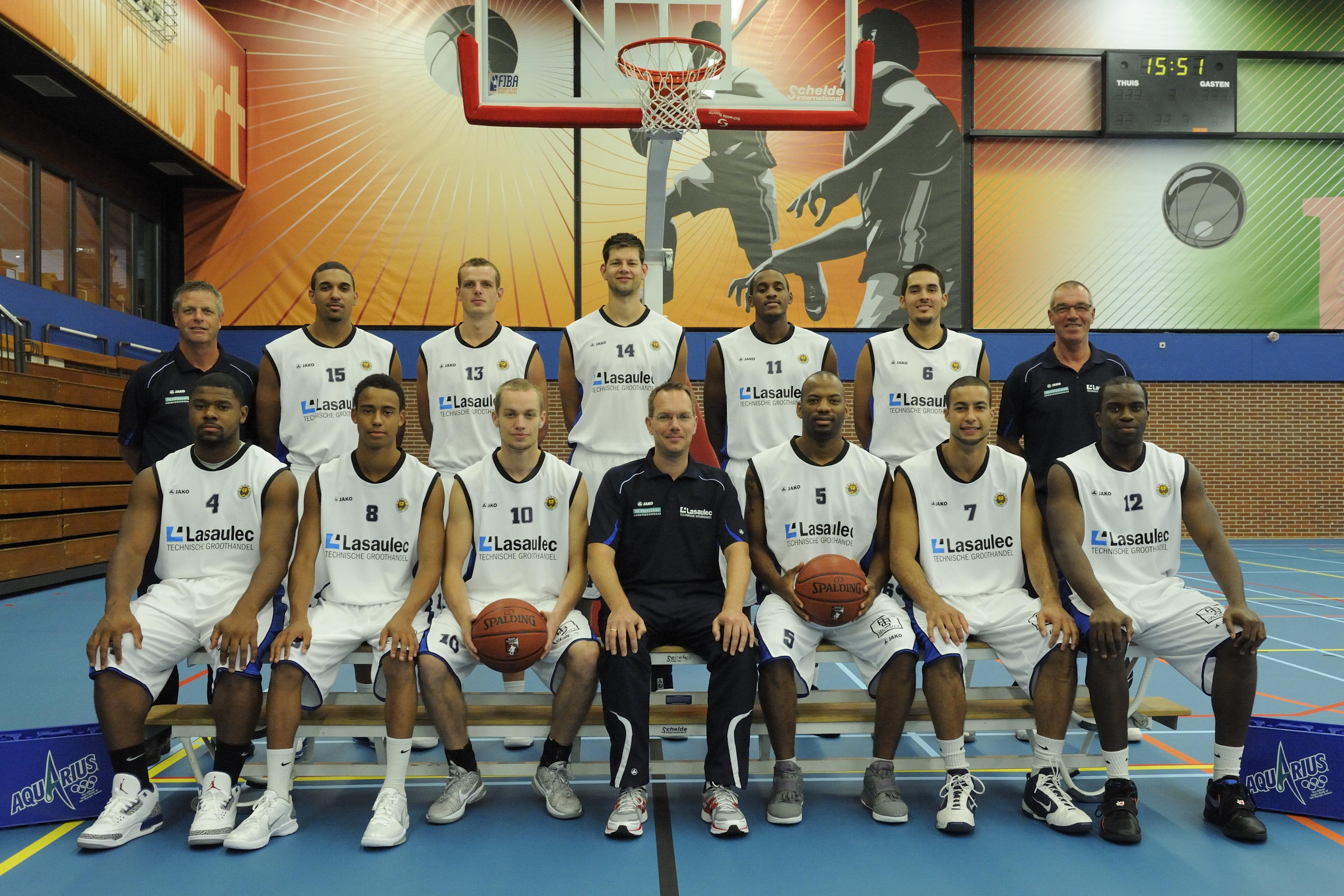
The teampicture of the Aris roster of the 2011–12 season

=== Current roster ===
Aris Leeuwarden roster
Players
Coaches

Pos.	No.	Nat.	Name	Ht.	Age
G	0	(Canada)	Maillet, Sam	2.01 m (6 ft 7 in)	24 – 16 August 2001
SG	3	(United States)	Frierson, Matt	1.85 m (6 ft 1 in)	29 – 2 May 1997
C	4	(United States)	Maidoh, Chris	2.06 m (6 ft 9 in)	26 – 18 July 2000
G	6	(Netherlands)	ter Weeme, Bram	1.90 m (6 ft 3 in)	20 – 16 July 2006
F	7	(Netherlands)	Heuker, Thijs	2.01 m (6 ft 7 in)	20 – 25 August 2005
F	8	(Netherlands)	Manuel, Edney	2.03 m (6 ft 8 in)	21 – 3 January 2005
PG	11	(United States)	Pryce, Shakael	1.88 m (6 ft 2 in)	26 – 14 April 2000
C	15	(Netherlands)	Brandsma, Reinder (C)	2.00 m (6 ft 7 in)	26 – 11 November 1999
PG	21	(Netherlands)	Janeck, Dyami	1.85 m (6 ft 1 in)	20 – 10 October 2005
F	24	(Netherlands)	Merkx, Bjorn	1.97 m (6 ft 6 in)	24 – 8 March 2002
F/C	28	(Netherlands) (Australia)	Forsyth, Tristan	2.08 m (6 ft 10 in)	28 – 19 January 1998
F	33	(United States)	O'Boyle, Leo	2.01 m (6 ft 7 in)	29 – 23 August 1996

Head coach

- (Netherlands) Vincent van Sliedregt

Assistant coach(es)

- (Netherlands) Klaas Stoppels

Physician(s)

- (Netherlands) Piet Bouius
- (Netherlands) Jan Watse Jousma

Team manager

- (Netherlands) Jouke Lemke

Legend

- (C) Team captain
- (FA) Free agent
- Injured

- Roster
- Transactions
Updated: November 7, 2025

Note: Flags indicate national team eligibility at FIBA-sanctioned events. Players may hold other non-FIBA nationalities not displayed.

=== Notable players ===
Note: Flags indicate national team eligibility at FIBA-sanctioned events. Players may hold other non-FIBA nationalities not displayed.

Criteria

To appear in this section a player must have either:

- Set a club record or won an individual award while at the club
- Played at least one official international match for their national team at any time
- Played at least one official NBA match at any time.

- (United States) Matt Bauscher
  (1 season: 2008–09)
- (United States) Lance Jeter
  (1 season: 2011–12)
- (United States) Mark Sanchez
  (2 seasons: 2010–12)
- (United States) Darius Theus
  (1 season: 2013–14)
- (Netherlands) Tjoe de Paula
  (5 seasons: 2010–15)
- (Netherlands) Rein van der Kamp
  (3 seasons: 2007–10)
- (United States) Whit Holcomb-Faye
  (1 season: 2012–13)
- (United States) Samme Givens
  (1 season: 2012–13)
- (Netherlands) Valentijn Lietmeijer
  (3 seasons: 2011–13, 2017–18)
- (United States) Darryl Monroe
  (1 season: 2009–10)
- (United States) Jordan Gregory
  (1 season: 2016–17)
- (Poland) Andrzej Mazurczak
  (1 season: 2019–20)
- (Iceland) Hlynur Bæringsson
  (1 season: 2005–06)
- (Iceland) Sigurður Þorvaldsson
  (1 season: 2005–06)
- (Netherlands) Craig Osaikhwuwuomwan
  (5 seasons: 2012–13, 2016–17, 2018–present)
- (Canada) Meshack Lufile
  (1 season: 2016-17)

=== Individual awards ===
All-DBL Team

- Brandon Woudstra – 2005
- Matt Bauscher – 2009
- Rein van der Kamp – 2009

DBL All-Defense Team

- Darius Theus – 2014

DBL Rookie of the Year

- Valentijn Lietmeijer – 2012

DBL Statistical Player of the Year

- Matt Bauscher – 2009
- Samme Givens – 2013
- Darius Theus – 2014

=== Top scorers by seasons ===
Season	Name	PPG
2011–12	(United States) Lance Jeter	16.8
2012–13	(United States) Samme Givens	16.4
2013–14	(United States) Darius Theus	16.5
2014–15	(Netherlands) Tjoe de Paula	17.0
2015–16	(United States) Javier Duren	17.7
2016–17	(United States) Jordan Gregory	18.6

Season	Name	PPG
2017–18	(United States) Emile Blackman	16.4
2018–19	(United States) Nick Masterson	16.6
2019–20	(Poland) Andrzej Mazurczak	16.5
2020–21	(United States) Chad Frazier	12.7
2021–22	(United States) Nigel Pruitt	16.9

== List of head coaches ==
The following list shows all head coaches of Aris Leeuwarden since its inception in 2004:

Name	From	To	Ref.
(Netherlands) Tom Simpson	2004	2006	
(Netherlands) Andre Roorda	2007	2008	
(Belgium) Tony van den Bosch	2008	2009	
(United States) Pete Miller	2009	2011	
(Netherlands) Erik Braal	2011	2013	
(Netherlands) Ed Molthoff	2013	February 2014	
(Netherlands) Tom Simpson	February 2014	2015	
(Netherlands) Michael Schuurs	2015	2016	
(Netherlands) Klaas Stoppels	2016	2017	
(Belgium) Tony van den Bosch	2017	April 2019	
(Netherlands) Anne van Dijk (interim)	April 2019	May 2019	
(Belgium) Ferried Naciri	September 2019	May 2021	
(Netherlands) Vincent van Sliedregt	June 2021	2026	
