= W. R. Myers High School =

Location
- 5511 54th St. Taber, Alberta, T1G 1L5; Canada; 49°47′27″N 112°08′32″W

Information
- School type: Public, high school
- Founded: 1950; 76 years ago
- Principal: Scott Petronech
- Staff: approx. 100
- Grades: 9–12
- Language: English
- Area: Taber, Alberta
- Nickname: Rebels
- Website: wrmyers.horizon.ab.ca

W. R. Myers High School is located in Taber, Alberta, Canada. Founded in 1950, it is the town's only public high school. Students at W.R. Myers range from grade 9 to grade 12. Taber's middle school, D.A. Ferguson, shares a cafeteria and a band room with W.R. Myers. The school has about 480 students and 50 staff members, both teachers and others. W.R. Myers has had large success in sports and music, creating a name for itself in western Canada. The basketball team and the WR Myers Fighting Rebels Football team has brought much success to the school.

== History ==
The new Taber High School opened its doors to students September 1950. Grades 10-12 moved into twenty classrooms equipped with a science lab, Two Home Economics rooms, one for homemaking the other for sewing, and Industrial Arts room with a small theatre, and a cafeteria with a kitchen. The structure, which cost about $200,000 to build, was to house 450 students.

In 1960 a Junior High wing and fine arts room, dubbed the "Lemon Squeezer" was constructed on the north end of the high school. The addition included two large gymnasiums, one for the Junior High grade 7-8 classes and one for the Senior High, a library and an office. At the time the new Junior/Senior High complex was named W.R Myers School in honour of Walter Ray Myers, a 27-Year school trustee. It was at this time that classes in the junior high school became departmentalized with one home room teacher and other individual teacher's instructing specific courses such as one for Math and one for Social, etc.

For nearly twenty years W.R Myers School saw little change except for a few cosmetic improvements and additions. Two air force hangars were moved just east of the school after World War II. One had three grade one classes in it, the other was the auditorium/gymnasium. Later, the grade one building became the industrial Arts shop. When the new gyms were completed at the Myers complex one of the hangars was moved to Cranford to be used as a community hall. A permanent Industrial Arts wing was added to the high school, and the air force hangar became a maintenance shop for the Taber School Division. Soon a Home Economics wing was added. It ran parallel to the Industrial arts wing. It was two story additions with a library; a visual aids room and business education classrooms. In the early 1970s, an Integrated Occupations Program for Junior and Senior High students was organized to accommodate students wanting to learn a trade rather than go to university. Students were being bussed from out-lying areas and there were many graduates working through their programs. In 1981, the two schools split, the north end becoming Taber Junior High for grades 7-9 and grades 10-12 becoming W.R. Myers High School.

With unexpected death of Junior High Principal, Donald A. Ferguson in 1985, the name was changed to D.A Ferguson Junior High. It was at that time that grade 6 classes were moved from the central school because of overcrowding.

By 1990, the grade 9 classes were moved to the high school and by 1994 D.A Ferguson had become D.A Ferguson Middle School housing grades 6-8, with W.R. Myers housing grades 9-12.

The school got a completely modern look when it underwent renovations. This included adding administration space, new library space that would be used for junior and senior high students, and an enclosed concourse hall along the east side of the school, a new ornamental façade at the entrance, and other changes to better utilize the school's space. By 2002 courses in multimedia were introduced after cable wiring was installed.

On April 28, 1999, eight days after the Columbine High School massacre, a 14-year-old former student entered the school and shot two students, killing one and wounding another.
