= 2012–13 Dutch Basketball League =

Basketball league

Dutch Basketball League
- Season: 2012–13
- Duration: 6 October 2012 – 23 May 2013
- Games played: 36
- Teams: 10

Regular season
- Top seed: EiffelTowers Den Bosch
- Season MVP: (United States) Andre Young

Finals
- Champions: ZZ Leiden (3rd title)
- Runners-up: Aris Leeuwarden
- Semi-finalists: EiffelTowers Den Bosch; GasTerra Flames

Statistical leaders
Points	(United States) Anthony Miles	18.8
Rebounds	(United States) Darryl Webb	9.9
Assists	(United States) Whit Holcomb-Faye	7.8

The 2012–13 Dutch Basketball League was the 53rd season of the Dutch Basketball League, the highest professional basketball league in the Netherlands. The season started on 6 October 2012 and ended on 23 May 2013.

Second-seeded ZZ Leiden won the DBL title, after defeating fourth-seeded Aris Leeuwarden 4–0 in the play-off finals. EiffelTowers Den Bosch player Andre Young was voted the Most Valuable Player of the regular season.

== Teams ==
Apollo Amsterdam and Den Helder Kings entered the DBL for the 2012–13 season to bring the number of teams to ten.

Location of teams in the 2012–13 Dutch Basketball League

=== Arenas and locations ===
Club	Location	Venue	Capacity
Apollo Amsterdam	Amsterdam	Apollohal	1,500
Aris Leeuwarden	Leeuwarden	Kalverdijkje	1,700
Stepco BSW	Weert	Sporthal Boshoven	1,000
Den Helder Kings	Den Helder	KingsDome	1,500
GasTerra Flames	Groningen	MartiniPlaza	4,350
EiffelTowers Den Bosch	's-Hertogenbosch	Maaspoort	2,800
Rotterdam Basketbal College	Rotterdam	Topsportcentrum Rotterdam	1,000
Landstede Basketbal	Zwolle	Landstede Sportcentrum	1,200
ZZ Leiden	Leiden	Vijf Meihal	2,000

== Regular season ==
=== Table ===
Pos	Team	Pld	W	L	PF	PA	PD	Pts	Qualification or relegation
1	EiffelTowers Den Bosch	36	30	6	3076	2503	+573	60	Qualification for playoffs
2	ZZ Leiden	36	27	9	2812	2381	+431	54	Qualification for playoffs
3	GasTerra Flames	36	26	10	2832	2623	+209	52	Qualification for playoffs
4	Aris Leeuwarden	36	20	16	3008	2862	+146	40	Qualification for playoffs
5	Landstede	36	19	17	2900	2819	+81	38	Qualification for playoffs
6	Den Helder Kings	36	18	18	2577	2625	−48	36	Qualification for playoffs
7	Matrixx Magixx	36	17	19	2902	2984	−82	34	Qualification for playoffs
8	Stepco BSW	36	16	20	2743	2924	−181	32	Qualification for playoffs
9	Apollo Amsterdam	36	4	32	2541	3064	−523	8	
10	Rotterdam Basketbal College	36	3	33	2589	3195	−606	6	

Source: DBL

=== Results ===
Team	AMS	DBO	DHE	GRO	LEE	LEI	ROT	WEE	WIJ	ZWO
AMS		63–82; 44–109	59–66; 59–85	68–89; 60–77	80–84; 80–85	68–85; 72–69	80–60; 91–97	75–76; 85–88	77–92; 87–95	71–83*; 65–68
DBO	85–56; 105–68		73–54; 82–66	64–68; 92–44	79–75*; 79–62	95–93*; 88–85	111–64; 100–73	88–66; 87–65	94–60; 96–78	86–84; 90–62
DHE	71–64; 88–66	79–64; 67–60		68–55; 72–87	53–80; 65–52	44–83; 70–75	88–70; 93–73	83–74; 71–61	95–71; 82–84	89–77; 71–64
GRO	91–67; 83–57	76–80; 75–83	83–75; 63–50		84–63; 90–87	69–67; 79–70	73–68; 105–83	97–53; 88–67	91–87; 95–74	85–83; 86–65
LEE	91–85; 103–69	60–98; 93–76	99–60; 86–60	78–71; 84–74		73–69; 72–93	120–64; 103–80	98–91; 85–61	90–96*; 98–82	91–85; 96–83
LEI	84–64; 100–49	64–59; 80–70	70–64; 71–59	70–48; 66–68	72–58; 70–59		101–66; 81–59	76–64; 91–58	86–75*; 70–54	66–56; 75–62
ROT	79–86; 71–85	46–95; 64–84	72–85; 72–73	73–77; 77–95	86–106; 75–87	49–86; 70–82		65–70; 70–74	70–80; 82–72	67–86; 80–94
WEE	82–67; 101–78	86–95; 87–92	77–85*; 80–68	83–77; 82–84	92–77; 81–79	65–63; 84–73	65–69; 83–79		78–87; 86–81	65–89; 90–92
WIJ	90–70; 86–79	68–77; 85–104	82–67; 77–67	83–64; 68–81	104–100*; 95–85	81–85; 60–74	88–70; 93–88	75–66; 84–87		100–82; 64–80
ZWO	79–64; 87–85	62–71; 78–85	77–70; 83–76	89–86; 66–74	92–69; 87–77	78–89; 72–78	97–67; 105–91	104–77; 67–77	88–78; 93–73	

* means win after overtime.

== Playoffs ==
See 2013 DBL Playoffs.

Quarterfinals
1	EiffelTowers Den Bosch	3
8	Stepco BSW	0
4	Aris Leeuwarden	3
5	Landstede Basketbal	0
2	Zorg en Zekerheid Leiden	3
7	Matrixx Magixx	0
3	GasTerra Flames	3
6	Den Helder Kings	0

Semifinals
1	EiffelTowers Den Bosch	1
4	Aris Leeuwarden	3
2	Zorg en Zekerheid Leiden	3
3	GasTerra Flames	0

Finals
4	Aris Leeuwarden	0
2	Zorg en Zekerheid Leiden	4

== Awards ==
Most Valuable Player
- (United States) Andre Young (EiffelTowers)

All-Star Team

- (United States) Andre Young (EiffelTowers)
- (Netherlands) Worthy de Jong (ZZ Leiden)
- (United States) Zach Novak ( Landstede)
- (Netherlands) Stefan Wessels (EiffelTowers)
- (Canada) Ross Bekkering (ZZ Leiden)

Best Defender of the Year

- (United States) Jason Dourisseau (GasTerra Flames)

Statistical Player of the Year

- (United States) Samme Givens (Aris Leeuwarden)

MVP Under 23

- (Netherlands) Jessey Voorn (GasTerra Flames)

Rookie of the Year

- (Netherlands) Berend Weijs (Apollo Amsterdam)

Most Improved Player

- (Netherlands) Jeroen van der List (Den Helder Kings)

Coach of the Year

- (Austria) Raoul Korner (EiffelTowers)

== Statistical leaders ==
=== Individual leaders ===
Category	Player	Team	Statistics
Points per game	(United States) Anthony Miles	Rotterdam Basketbal College	18.8
Rebounds per game	(United States) Darryl Webb	Landstede Basketbal	9.9
Assists per game	(United States) Whit Holcomb-Faye	Aris Leeuwarden	7.8
Steals per game	(United States) Josh Magette	Landstede Basketbal	2.6
Blocks per game	(Netherlands) Berend Weijs	BC Apollo	2.8
Turnovers per game	(Netherlands) Aron Royé	BC Apollo	3.0
Minutes per game	(United States) Bryquis Perine	Stepco BSW	35.8
Fouls per game	(United States) Antwan Carter	Stepco BSW	3.5
FG%	(United States) Samme Givens	Aris Leeuwarden	.660
FT%	(United States) Zack Novak	Landstede Basketbal	.843
3FG%	(Netherlands) Ties Theeuwkens	GasTerra Flames	.466

=== Team statistics ===
Category	Team	Statistics
Points per game	EiffelTowers	85.4
Rebounds per game	GasTerra Flames	40.4
Assists per game	EiffelTowers	19.3
Steals per game	EiffelTowers	15.4
Blocks per game	BC Apollo	3.3
Turnovers per game	BC Apollo	17.2
Fouls per game	Den Helder Kings	20.5
FG%	Aris Leeuwarden	.573
FT%	EiffelTowers	.762
3FG%	EiffelTowers	.364
