= Samme Givens =

American basketball player (born 1989)

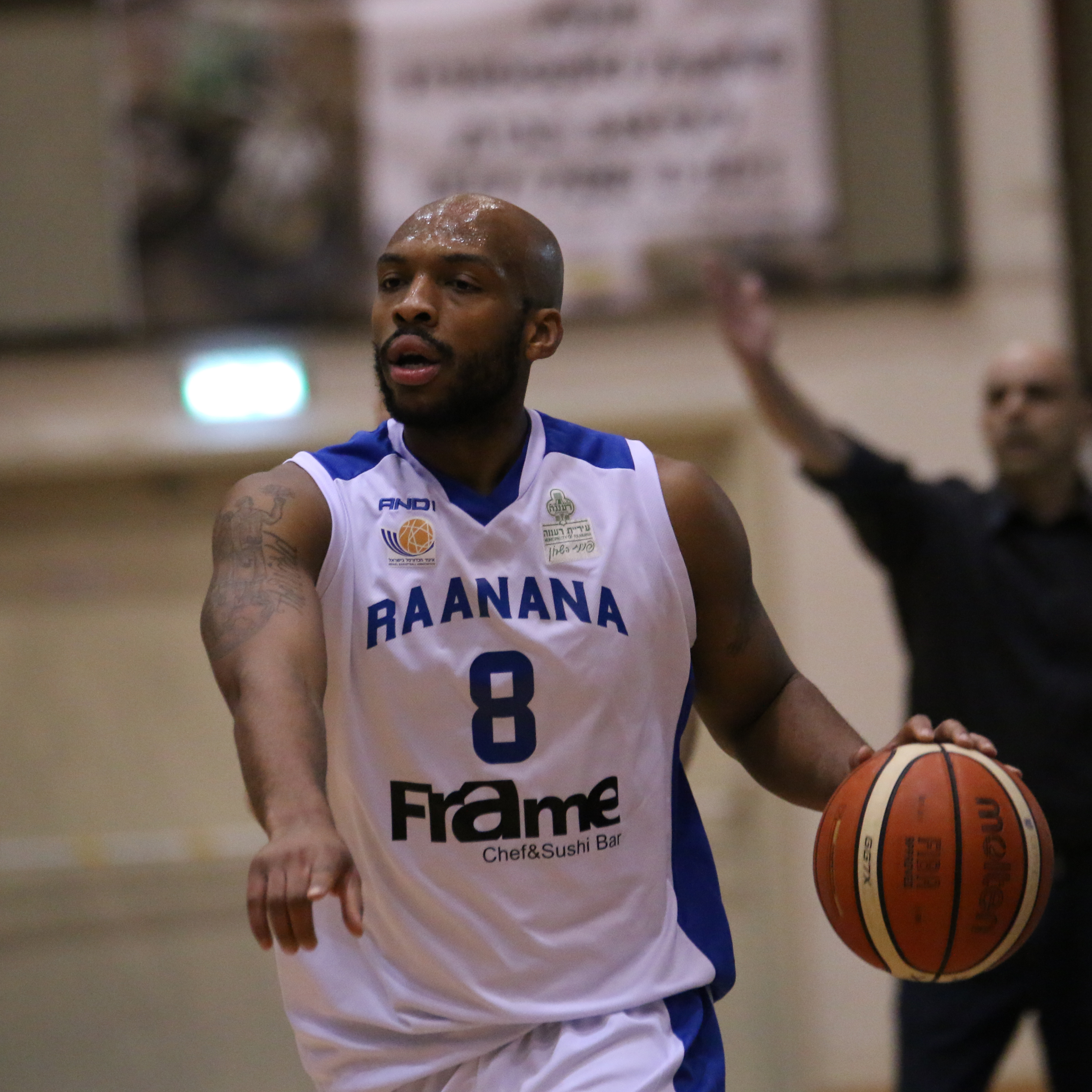
- Givens with Maccabi Ra'anana in January 2017

No. 45 – Kauhajoen Karhu
- Position: Small forward / power forward
- League: Korisliiga

Personal information
- Born: August 9, 1989 (age 37) Philadelphia, Pennsylvania
- Listed height: 6 ft 6 in (1.98 m)
- Listed weight: 220 lb (100 kg)

Career information
- High school: Academy of the New Church (Philadelphia, Pennsylvania)
- College: Drexel (2008–2012)
- NBA draft: 2012: undrafted
- Playing career: 2012–present

Career history
- 2012–2013: Aris Leeuwarden
- 2013–2014: ALM Évreux
- 2014–2015: S.Oliver Würzburg
- 2015–2018: Maccabi Ra'anana
- 2018–2019: Maccabi Haifa
- 2019–2020: Kauhajoki Karhu
- 2020–2021: Ravenna
- 2021–2022: Oberá Tenis Club
- 2022: Libertadores de Querétaro
- 2022-2023: Stella Azzurra Roma
- 2023-present: Kauhajoen Karhu

Career highlights
- Israeli National League champion (2019); DBL Statistical Player of the Year (2013)

Samme Givens (born August 9, 1989) is an American professional basketball player for Oberá Tenis Club of the La Liga Argentina de Básquet (LLA). He played college basketball for Drexel University before playing professionally in the Netherlands, France, Germany and Israel.

== Professional career ==
In his first season as a professional basketball player, Givens played for Aris Leeuwarden in the Dutch Basketball League (DBL). The website Eurobasket.com named him the most valuable player of the regular season, however, Givens did not win the official award. With Aris, Givens reached the league finals, after surprising top-seeded EiffelTowers Den Bosch in the semi-finals. On June 19, 2013, Givens signed with ALM Évreux Basket of the Pro B in France.

On September 15, 2015, Givens signed with the Israeli team Maccabi Ra'anana of the Liga Leumit. In his third season with Ra'anana, Givens averaged 18.3 points, 9.5 rebounds, 3.5 assists and 1.6 steals per game and earned a spot in the All-Liga Leumit Second Team by the Eurobasket.com website.

On July 3, 2018, Givens signed a two-year deal with Maccabi Haifa, joining his former head coach Barak Peleg. Givens won the 2019 Israeli National League Championship with Haifa.

On August 15, 2019, He signed with Kauhajoki Karhu of the Korisliiga. Averaging 17.2 points, 5.7 rebounds, 2.2 assists and 1.4 steals.

In the 2020–21 season, Givens played with Ravenna of the Italian Serie A2 Basket.

In the 2021–22 season, Givens played in Argentina with Oberá Tenis Club in Liga Nacional de Básquet.

== The Basketball Tournament ==
In the summer of 2017, Givens played in The Basketball Tournament (TBT) on ESPN for the Broad Street Brawlers. He competed for the $2 million prize, and for the Brawlers, he averaged 14.8 points per game while also averaging 7.5 rebounds per game. Givens helped the Brawlers reach the second round of the tournament, losing then to Team Colorado, 111–95.

In TBT 2018, Givens suited up for the Talladega Knights. In 4 games, he averaged 11 points, 10.3 rebounds, and 1.5 steals per game. The Talladega Knights reached the Northeast Regional Championship before falling to the Golden Eagles.

Givens completed with Team Brotherly Love in the 2020 edition of the tournament.

== Awards and accomplishments ==
=== Club ===
Maccabi Haifa

- Israeli National League: (2019)

=== Individual ===
- DBL Statistical Player of the Year: (2013)
