= Croatia men's national under-18 and under-19 basketball team =

Croatia
- Joined FIBA: 1992
- FIBA zone: FIBA Europe
- National federation: Croatian Basketball Federation
- Nickname: Kockasti

U19 World Cup
- Appearances: 7
- Medals: Silver: 1 (2015); Bronze: 2 (1999, 2009)

U18 EuroBasket
- Appearances: 22
- Medals: Gold: 3 (1996, 2002, 2012); Silver: 4 (1994, 1998, 2000, 2013); Bronze: 2 (2008, 2014)

U18 EuroBasket Division B
- Appearances: 3
- Medals: Gold: 1 (2017)
| Home | Away |

The Croatia men's national under-18 and under-19 basketball team are boys' basketball teams, administered by the Croatian Basketball Federation, that represent Croatia in international youth men's basketball competitions. The Croatia men's national under-18 basketball team (Hrvatska juniorska reprezentacija) represents Croatia at the FIBA U18 EuroBasket, where it has a chance to qualify for the FIBA U19 World Cup.

The Croatia men's under-19 team has achieved success in World Cup competition with one silver and two bronzes. But has achieved even more success in European Championships with three golds, four silvers and two bronzes.

== History ==
From 1964 to 1992 Croatian players played for Yugoslavia. Croatia participated in its first ever FIBA Europe Under-18 Championship as an independent entity in 1994. All the results of the Yugoslavia national basketball team men's, women's, youth and senior selections prior to the breakup of SFR Yugoslavia were recognized as results of the newly formed FR Yugoslavia.

The team won their first gold medal at the 1996 FIBA Europe Under-18 Championship.

== FIBA U19 World Cup competitive record ==
| Year | Pos. | GP | W | L | Ref. |
|---|---|---|---|---|---|
| 1979–1991 | Part of SFR Yugoslavia | | | | |
| (Greece) 1995 | 4th | 8 | 5 | 3 | |
| (Portugal) 1999 | 3rd | 8 | 6 | 2 | |
| (Greece) 2003 | 4th | 8 | 5 | 3 | |
| (Serbia) 2007 | Did not qualify | | | | |
| (New Zealand) 2009 | 3rd | 9 | 7 | 2 | |
| (Latvia) 2011 | 8th | 9 | 4 | 5 | |
| (Czech Republic) 2013 | 8th | 9 | 5 | 4 | |
| (Greece) 2015 | 2nd | 7 | 5 | 2 | |
| (Egypt) 2017 | Did not qualify | | | | |
| (Greece) 2019 | Did not qualify | | | | |
| (Latvia) 2021 | Did not qualify | | | | |
| (Hungary) 2023 | Did not qualify | | | | |
| (Switzerland) 2025 | Did not qualify | | | | |
| (Czech Republic) 2027 | Did not qualify | | | | |
| (Indonesia) 2029 | To be determined | | | | |
| Total | 7/14 | 58 | 37 | 21 | |

=== Past rosters ===
| 1995 Championship | 1999 Championship | 2003 Championship | 2009 Championship | 2011 Championship | 2013 Championship | 2015 Championship |
|---|---|---|---|---|---|---|
| 4 Jurica Ružić; 5 Marko Punda; 6 Gordan Giriček; 7 Ivan Perinčić; 8 Josip Sesar; 9 Vladimir Anzulović; 10 Ivan Vujić; 11 Marin Prskalo; 12 Krešimir Novosel; 13 Mate Miliša; 14 Dubravko Zemljić; 15 Sandro Nicević | 4 Srđan Subotić; 5 Ante Stamać; 6 Marko Malić; 7 Marko Morić; 8 Domagoj Devčić; 9 Boris Džidić; 10 Zoran Planinić; 11 Mario Stojić; 12 Dalibor Bagarić; 13 Zoran Pehar; 14 Andrija Žižić; 15 Ivica Škalabrin | 4 Hrvoje Perić; 5 Mario Kralj; 6 Davor Filipović; 7 Mateo Kedžo; 8 Damir Markota; 9 Marko Tomas; 10 Roko Ukić; 11 Drago Pašalić; 12 Martin Previšić; 13 Marko Banić; 14 Franko Kaštropil; 15 Ivan Novačić | 4 Nikola Došen; 5 Luka Babić; 6 Josip Bilinovac; 7 Mario Delaš (MVP+ATT); 8 Šime Olivari; 9 Dino Butorac; 10 Toni Prostran (ATT); 11 Ivan Batur; 12 Darko Planinić; 13 Domagoj Bubalo; 14 Leon Radošević; 15 Tomislav Zubčić | 4 Martin Junaković; 5 Stefan Zadravec; 6 Toni Katić; 7 Stipe Krstanović; 8 Mislav Brzoja; 9 Marino Kučan; 10 Boris Barać; 11 Marko Ramljak; 12 Dino Repeša; 13 Mario Hezonja; 14 Filip Bundović; 15 Dario Šarić | 4 Martin Junaković; 5 Tomislav Gabrić; 6 Josip Gulam; 7 Jakov Mustapić; 8 Lovro Demo; 9 Dario Šarić (ATT); 10 Mislav Brzoja; 11 Dominik Mavra; 12 Domagoj Bošnjak; 13 Ivan Bender; 14 Marin Marić; 15 Valentin Jurković | 4 Borna Kapusta; 5 Goran Filipović; 6 Ivan Majcunić; 7 Roko Badžim; 8 Luka Božić; 9 Ivan Vraneš; 10 Nik Slavica; 11 Dragan Bender; 12 Ante Žižić; 13 Ivica Zubac; 14 Ivan Karaćić; 15 Marko Arapović (ATT) |

== FIBA U18 EuroBasket competitive record ==
| Division A | | | | | | Division B | | | | | |
| Year | Pos. | GP | W | L | Ref. | Year | Pos. | GP | W | L | Ref. |
|---|---|---|---|---|---|---|---|---|---|---|---|
| 1964–1990 | Part of SFR Yugoslavia | | | | | | | | | | |
| (Hungary) 1992 | Did not participate | | | | | | | | | | |
| (Israel) 1994 | 2nd | 7 | 6 | 1 | | | | | | | |
| (France) 1996 | 1st | 7 | 7 | 0 | | | | | | | |
| (Bulgaria) 1998 | 2nd | 8 | 5 | 3 | | | | | | | |
| (Croatia) 2000 | 2nd | 8 | 7 | 1 | | | | | | | |
| (Germany) 2002 | 1st | 8 | 7 | 1 | | | | | | | |
| (Spain) 2004 | Did not qualify | | | | | | | | | | |
| (Serbia and Montenegro) 2005 | 11th | 8 | 3 | 5 | | | | | | | |
| (Greece) 2006 | 10th | 8 | 4 | 4 | | | | | | | |
| (Spain) 2007 | 8th | 8 | 2 | 6 | | | | | | | |
| (Greece) 2008 | 3rd | 8 | 5 | 3 | | | | | | | |
| (France) 2009 | 8th | 9 | 4 | 5 | | | | | | | |
| (Lithuania) 2010 | 5th | 9 | 6 | 3 | | | | | | | |
| (Poland) 2011 | 8th | 9 | 4 | 5 | | | | | | | |
| (Lithuania) (Latvia) 2012 | 1st | 9 | 8 | 1 | | | | | | | |
| (Latvia) 2013 | 2nd | 9 | 5 | 4 | | | | | | | |
| (Turkey) 2014 | 3rd | 9 | 8 | 1 | | | | | | | |
| (Greece) 2015 | 12th | 9 | 4 | 5 | | | | | | | |
| (Turkey) 2016 | 14th | 6 | 2 | 4 | | | | | | | |
| (Slovakia) 2017 | | | | | | (Estonia) 2017 | 1st | 8 | 8 | 0 | |
| (Latvia) 2018 | 11th | 7 | 3 | 4 | | | | | | | |
| (Greece) 2019 | 13th | 7 | 3 | 4 | | | | | | | |
| (Turkey) 2022 | 13th | 7 | 3 | 4 | | | | | | | |
| (Serbia) 2023 | 10th | 7 | 3 | 4 | | | | | | | |
| (Finland) 2024 | 14th | 7 | 2 | 5 | | | | | | | |
| (Serbia) 2025 | | | | | | (Romania) 2025 | 10th | 7 | 5 | 2 | |
| (Italy) 2026 | | | | | | (Croatia) 2026 | 8th | 7 | 4 | 3 | |
| Total | 22/26 | 174 | 101 | 73 | | Total | 3/20 | 22 | 17 | 5 | |

=== Past rosters ===
| 1994 Championship | 1996 Championship | 1998 Championship | 2000 Championship | 2002 Championship | 2005 Championship | 2006 Championship | 2007 Championship |
|---|---|---|---|---|---|---|---|
| 4 Krešimir Novosel; 5 Marko Punda; 6 Gordan Giriček; 7 Ivan Perinčić; 8 Ivan Vujić; 9 Ante Kapov; 10 Igor Miličić; 11 Ante Slavica; 12 Zoran Huljev; 13 Mate Miliša; 14 Dubravko Zemljić; 15 Sandro Nicević | 4 Vladimir Anzulović; 5 Branimir Longin; 6 Ivan Tomeljak; 7 Hrvoje Henjak; 8 Hrvoje Perinčić; 9 Andrej Štimac; 10 Josip Sesar; 11 Joško Poljak; 12 Marijan Mance; 13 Jurica Žuža; 14 Nikola Vujčić; 15 Dalibor Bagarić | 4 Ivan Tomas; 5 Srđan Subotić; 6 Domagoj Vidaković; 7 Ante Samac; 8 Domagoj Devčić; 9 Boris Džidić; 10 Mario Kasun; 11 Mario Stojić; 12 Marko Malić; 13 Jere Macura; 14 Andrija Žižić; 15 Krešimir Lončar | 4 Ivan Morić; 5 Eduard Pulja; 6 Marko Popović; 7 Krešimir Lončar; 8 Lovro Gligora; 9 Mladen Gligora; 10 Zoran Planinić; 11 Neven Ćuzela; 12 Toni Dijan; 13 Marin Rozić; 14 Ivan Krolo; 15 Denis Vrsaljko | 4 Luka Popović; 5 Hrvoje Gašparac; 6 Davor Filipović; 7 Mateo Kedžo; 8 Filip Bašljan; 9 Marko Tomas; 10 Roko Ukić; 11 Drago Pašalić; 12 Martin Previšić; 13 Marko Banić; 14 Franko Kaštropil; 15 Ivan Novačić | 4 Luka Bekavac; 5 Josip Blajić; 6 Luka Drezga; 7 Zvonko Buljan; 8 Franko Filipović; 9 Marko Raić; 10 Zoran Vrkić; 11 Aleksandar Ugrinoski; 12 Ivan Siriščević; 13 Ivan Papac; 14 Ante Tomić; 15 Denis Paulić | 4 Ante Nerber; 5 Teo Petani; 6 Aleksandar Ugrinoski; 7 Jure Škifić; 8 Filip Krušlin; 9 Ante Delaš; 10 Bojan Bogdanović; 11 Željko Šakić; 12 Filip Vukičević; 13 Ivan Mileković; 14 Ante Đugum; 15 Toni Soda | 4 Marko Radić; 5 Sven Smajlagić; 6 Karlo Vragović; 7 Mario Delaš; 8 Aljoša Šarac; 9 Antonio Oštrić; 10 Filip Krušlin; 11 Marijo Hajdić; 12 Pavle Marčinković; 13 Marino Šarlija; 14 Robert Rikić; 15 Miro Bilan |

| 2008 Championship | 2009 Championship | 2010 Championship | 2011 Championship | 2012 Championship | 2013 Championship | 2014 Championship | 2015 Championship |
|---|---|---|---|---|---|---|---|
| 4 Nikola Došen; 5 Toni Prostran; 6 Josip Bilinovac; 7 Sven Smajlagić; 8 Goran Fodor; 9 Ivan Ramljak; 10 Ivan Batur; 11 Darko Planinić; 12 Tomislav Zubčić; 13 Leon Radošević; 14 Mario Delaš (ATT); 15 Robert Rikić | 4 Nikola Došen; 5 Luka Babić; 6 Ante Čutura; 7 Domagoj Bubalo; 8 Dino Jakoliš; 9 Paško Vrlika; 10 Toni Prostran; 11 Ivan Batur; 12 Matteo Juričić; 13 Boris Barać; 14 Dragan Sekelja; 15 Toni Brnas | 4 Stefan Zadravec; 5 Roko Rogić; 6 Toni Katić; 7 Boris Barać; 8 Alex Percan; 9 Marino Kučan; 10 Marin Kukoč; 11 Marko Ramljak; 12 Dario Šarić; 13 Franko Šango; 14 Filip Najev; 15 Josip Matić | 4 Stipe Čubrić; 5 Martin Junaković; 6 Petar Madunić; 7 Stipe Krstanović; 8 Matej Buovac; 9 Antonio Boban; 10 Mislav Brzoja; 11 Marko Ramljak; 12 Domagoj Vuković; 13 Ante Smolić; 14 Josip Mikulić; 15 Armin Mazić | 4 Marko Proleta; 5 Tomislav Gabrić; 6 Karlo Lebo; 7 Jakov Mustapić; 8 Lovro Demo; 9 Dario Šarić (MVP+ATT); 10 Mislav Brzoja; 11 Dominik Mavra; 12 Antonio Črnjević; 13 Daniel Zovko; 14 Marin Marić; 15 Karlo Žganec | 4 Josip Gulam; 5 Ivan Jukić; 6 Paolo Marinelli (ATT); 7 Domagoj Bošnjak (ATT); 8 Tomislav Gabrić; 9 Andrija Ćorić; 10 Dorian Jelenek; 11 Juraj Kožić; 12 Bruno Žganec; 13 Marko Arapović; 14 Lovro Mazalin; 15 Karlo Žganec | 4 Borna Kapusta; 5 Goran Filipović; 6 Ivan Majcunić; 7 Roko Badžim; 8 Luka Božić; 9 Ivan Vučić; 10 Nik Slavica; 11 Dragan Bender (ATT); 12 Ante Žižić; 13 Josip Jukić; 14 Lovro Mazalin; 15 Marko Arapović | 4 Bruno Skokna; 5 Mate Kalajžić; 6 Petar Dubelj; 7 Roko Badžim; 8 Franko Kalpić; 9 Mateo Čolak; 10 Karlo Mikšić; 11 Lovro Buljević; 12 Domagoj Proleta; 13 Ivica Zubac; 14 Domagoj Vrkić; 15 Krešmir Ljubičić |

| 2016 Championship | 2017 Division B 1st | 2018 Championship | 2019 Championship | 2022 Championship | 2023 Championship | 2024 Championship |
|---|---|---|---|---|---|---|
| 4 Domagoj Šarić; 5 Mate Mandić; 6 Josip Barnjak; 7 Darko Bajo; 8 Karlo Uljarević; 9 Emil Savić; 10 Domagoj Proleta; 11 Leo Čizmić; 12 Luka Barišić; 13 Pavao Paić; 14 Krešimir Ljubičić; 15 Lovro Buljević | 4 Antonio Jordano; 5 Domagoj Šarić; 6 Luka Šamanić (MVP+ATT); 7 Darko Bajo; 8 Jan Palokaj; 9 Toni Nakić; 10 Ivan Omrčen; 11 Mateo Drežnjak; 12 Ivan Vrgoč; 13 Gabriel Marić; 14 Jakov Kukić; 15 Marko Jurić | 4 Jure Planinić; 5 Oton Janković; 6 Luka Šamanić; 7 Lovre Runjić; 8 Edi Patekar; 9 Jan Palokaj; 10 Roko Erslan; 11 Filip Vujičić; 12 Mario Rajčić; 13 Vito Čubrilo; 14 Roko Macner; 15 Danko Branković | 4 Filip Paponja; 5 Karlo Lukačić; 6 Matej Rudan; 7 Sandro Rašić; 8 Ivan Gulin; 9 Lovro Gnjidić; 10 Roko Škarica; 11 Matej Bošnjak; 12 Leon Bulić; 13 Ante Perkušić; 14 Lukša Buljević; 15 Viktor Šarić | 4 Andrija Jelavić; 5 David Pavin; 6 Vigo Bart; 7 Luka Krajnović; 8 Vice Zanki; 9 Leon Šljivarić; 10 Mihael Kos; 11 Ivan Bogdanović; 12 Marko Vučić; 13 Marino Dubravčić; 14 Stellan Rajaofera; 15 Ivan Matleković | 4 Ivan Jurić; 5 Dominik Dolić; 6 Vigo Bart; 7 Vito Perković; 8 David Pavin; 9 Toni Bilić; 10 Luka Frančešević; 11 Marko Ljubičić; 12 Noa Zemljić; 15 Pero Zubac; 16 Šimun Lončar; 17 Tin Udovičić | 2 Vice Grbić; 3 Ivan Jurić; 5 Josip Pavković; 5 Andro Mirčeta; 7 Roko Jemo; 8 Dominik Dolić; 9 Toni Torbarina; 10 Ivan Volf; 11 Vito Perković; 12 Andrej Radivojević; 13 Luka Bičić; 14 Toni Josipović |

== See also ==
- Croatia men's national basketball team
- Croatia men's national under-16 and under-17 basketball team
- Croatia women's national under-18 basketball team
