= Lithuania men's national under-18 and under-19 basketball team =

Lithuania
- Joined FIBA: 1936
- FIBA zone: FIBA Europe
- National federation: Lithuanian Basketball Federation
- Coach: Saulius Štombergas
- Nickname(s): Basketball: The Second Religion, Game of the Nation

U19 World Cup
- Appearances: 9
- Medals: Gold: 1 (2011); Silver: 1 (2003); Bronze: 1 (2013)

U18 EuroBasket
- Appearances: 26
- Medals: Gold: 2 (1994, 2010); Silver: 4 (2006, 2008, 2012, 2016); Bronze: 2 (2015, 2017)
Home	Away

The Lithuania men's national under-18 and under-19 basketball team (Lithuanian: Lietuvos nacionalinė vaikinų jaunių iki 18 ir jaunimo iki 19 krepšinio rinktinė), is the representative for Lithuania in international under-18 and under-19 men's basketball competitions, and it is organized and run by the Lithuanian Basketball Federation.

The team represents Lithuania at the FIBA U18 EuroBasket and at the FIBA U19 World Cup.

== Competitive record ==
=== FIBA U18 EuroBasket ===
Year	Pos.	Pld	W	L	Ref.
1964 to 1988	Did not participate – part of the Soviet Union				
(Netherlands) 1990	Did not participate				
(Hungary) 1992	Did not participate				
(Israel) 1994	1st	7	6	1	
(France) 1996	12th	7	2	5	
(Bulgaria) 1998	9th	7	3	4	
(Croatia) 2000	7th	8	3	5	
(Germany) 2002	4th	8	4	4	
(Spain) 2004	9th	7	4	3	
(Serbia) 2005	9th	8	4	4	
(Greece) 2006	2nd	8	7	1	
(Spain) 2007	4th	8	5	3	
(Greece) 2008	2nd	8	5	3	
(France) 2009	4th	9	7	2	
(Lithuania) 2010	1st	9	9	0	
(Poland) 2011	5th	9	6	3	
(Lithuania) 2012	2nd	9	8	1	
(Latvia) 2013	5th	9	6	3	
(Turkey) 2014	7th	9	4	5	
(Greece) 2015	3rd	9	6	3	
(Turkey) 2016	2nd	6	4	2	
(Slovakia) 2017	3rd	7	5	2	
(Latvia) 2018	5th	7	6	1	
(Greece) 2019	7th	7	3	4	
(Turkey) 2022	7th	7	5	2	
(Serbia) 2023	11th	7	3	4	
(Finland) 2024	6th	7	3	4	
(Serbia) 2025	9th	7	6	1	
(Italy) 2026	11th	7	3	4	
Total	26/28	201	127	74	

=== FIBA U19 World Cup ===
Year	Pos.	Pld	W	L	Ref.
1979 to 1987	Did not participate – part of the Soviet Union				
(Canada) 1991	Did not participate				
(Greece) 1995	5th	8	6	2	
(Portugal) 1999	Did not qualify				
(Greece) 2003	2nd	8	5	3	
(Serbia) 2007	9th	8	4	4	
(New Zealand) 2009	9th	8	5	3	
(Latvia) 2011	1st	9	7	2	
(Czech Republic) 2013	3rd	9	7	2	
(Greece) 2015	Did not qualify				
(Egypt) 2017	6th	7	5	2	
(Greece) 2019	4th	7	3	4	
(Latvia) 2021	6th	7	4	3	
(Hungary) 2023	Did not qualify				
(Switzerland) 2025	Did not qualify				
(Czech Republic) 2027	Did not qualify				
(Indonesia) 2029	To be determined				
Total	9/16	71	46	25	

== Roster ==
2019 FIBA Under-19 Basketball World Cup

Lithuania men's national under-19 basketball team roster
Players
Coaches

Pos.	No.	Nat.	Name	Ht.	Wt.	Age
SF	13	(Lithuania)	Jarumbauskas, Simas	1.92 m (6 ft 4 in)	86 kg (190 lb)	26 – 1 July 2000
PF	24	(Lithuania)	Metrikis, Klaidas	2.02 m (6 ft 8 in)	100 kg (220 lb)	26 – 21 February 2000
PG	88	(Lithuania)	Vilys, Domantas	1.88 m (6 ft 2 in)	74 kg (163 lb)	26 – 12 January 2000
F	21	(Lithuania)	Venskus, Erikas	2.05 m (6 ft 9 in)	100 kg (220 lb)	26 – 28 May 2000
SG	1	(Lithuania)	Ramanauskas, Justinas	1.95 m (6 ft 5 in)	84 kg (185 lb)	26 – 21 September 2000
SF	77	(Lithuania)	Mineikis, Nojus	2.00 m (6 ft 7 in)	87 kg (192 lb)	25 – 29 November 2000
PG	55	(Lithuania)	Vaitkus, Matas	1.80 m (5 ft 11 in)	65 kg (143 lb)	26 – 6 September 2000
PF	27	(Lithuania)	Bergaudas, Giedrius	2.10 m (6 ft 11 in)	95 kg (209 lb)	25 – 17 November 2000
SG	5	(Lithuania)	Arlauskas, Martynas	2.00 m (6 ft 7 in)	89 kg (196 lb)	26 – 10 July 2000
PG	9	(Lithuania)	Giedraitis, Dovydas	1.90 m (6 ft 3 in)	89 kg (196 lb)	26 – 17 August 2000
SF	7	(Lithuania)	Urbonavičius, Gertautas	1.98 m (6 ft 6 in)	87 kg (192 lb)	26 – 9 July 2000
PG	31	(Lithuania)	Jokubaitis, Rokas	1.93 m (6 ft 4 in)	84 kg (185 lb)	25 – 19 November 2000

Head coach

- (Lithuania) Gediminas Petrauskas

Legend

- (C) Team captain
- Injured

- Roster
Updated: 06-26-2019

== Past rosters of medal-winning teams ==
1994 FIBA Europe Under-18 Championship – Gold medal (gold)

Žydrūnas Urbonas, Andrius Jurkūnas, Šarūnas Jasikevičius, Marius Janulis, Kęstutis Marčiulionis, Nerijus Karlikanovas, Kęstutis Šeštokas, Marijus Kovaliukas, Arnas Kazlauskas, Saulius Raziulis, Mindaugas Lydeka (Head coach: Jonas Kazlauskas)

2003 FIBA Under-19 World Championship – Silver medal (silver)

Artūras Jomantas, Laurynas Pečiukaitis, Linas Kleiza, Jonas Mačiulis, Steponas Babrauskas, Valdas Dabkus, Paulius Jankūnas, Paulius Joneliūnas, Marius Prekavičius, Darius Šilinskis, Linas Lekavičius, Gediminas Maceina (Head coach: Ramūnas Butautas)

2006 FIBA Europe Under-18 Championship – Silver medal (silver)

Martynas Gecevičius, Paulius Beliavičius, Darius Gvezdauskas, Paulius Kleiza, Gabrielius Ramonas, Pranas Skurdauskas, Rokas Ūzas, Marius Valukonis, Vaidas Čepukaitis, Žygimantas Janavičius, Lukas Brazdauskis, Rokas Grinius (Head coach: Rutenis Paulauskas)

2008 FIBA Europe Under-18 Championship – Silver medal (silver)

Gediminas Bertašius, Kristijonas Gaska, Donatas Motiejūnas (MVP), Matas Sapiega, Tautvydas Šležas, Gilvydas Biruta, Mantas Kadzevičius, Augustas Pečiukevičius, Giedrius Staniulis, Evaldas Kairys, Tomas Milinskas, Marius Zimnickas (Head coach: Vitoldas Masalskis)

2010 FIBA Europe Under-18 Championship – Gold medal (gold)

Jonas Valančiūnas (MVP), Evaldas Aniulis, Vytenis Čižauskas, Rolandas Jakštas, Tadas Maželis, Deividas Pukis, Dovydas Redikas, Renaldas Simanavičius, Žygimantas Skučas, Edgaras Ulanovas, Tautvydas Sabonis, Egidijus Mockevičius (Head coach: Kazys Maksvytis)

2011 FIBA Under-19 World Championship – Gold medal (gold)

Jonas Valančiūnas (MVP), Vytenis Čižauskas, Rolandas Jakštas, Deividas Pukis, Dovydas Redikas, Renaldas Simanavičius, Žygimantas Skučas, Edgaras Ulanovas, Tautvydas Sabonis, Arnas Butkevičius, Egidijus Mockevičius, Rokas Giedraitis (Head coach: Kazys Maksvytis)

2012 FIBA Europe Under-18 Championship – Silver medal (silver)

Augustinas Jankaitis, Tomas Galeckas, Jokūbas Gintvainis, Marius Grigonis, Tautvydas Jodelis, Lukas Lekavičius, Simas Raupys, Mantvydas Stašelis, Justas Tamulis, Denis Krestinin, Benas Griciūnas, Rokas Gustys (Head coach: Arūnas Visockas)

2013 FIBA Under-19 World Championship – Bronze medal (bronze)

Augustinas Jankaitis, Tomas Dimša, Jokūbas Gintvainis, Marius Grigonis, Lukas Lekavičius, Simas Raupys, Mantvydas Stašelis, Justas Tamulis, Donatas Tarolis, Denis Krestinin, Rokas Gustys, Martinas Geben (Head coach: Tomas Masiulis)

2015 FIBA Europe Under-18 Championship – Bronze medal (bronze)

Jokūbas Švambaris, Martynas Varnas, Laurynas Beliauskas, Arnas Beručka, Laurynas Birutis, Mykolas Dieninis, Martynas Echodas, Tadas Sedekerskis, Arnoldas Kulboka, Gytis Masiulis, Aistis Pilauskas, Gvidas Galinauskas (Head coach: Saulius Štombergas)

2016 FIBA U18 European Championship – Silver medal (silver)

Tadas Sedekerskis, Arnoldas Kulboka, Gytis Masiulis, Džiugas Slavinskas, Einaras Tubutis, Grantas Vasiliauskas, Ignas Sargiūnas, Lukas Uleckas, Arnas Velička, Matas Jogėla (Head coach: Rimantas Grigas)

2017 FIBA U18 European Championship – Bronze medal (bronze)

Grantas Vasiliauskas, Elvis Juozaitis, Lukas Kišūnas, Vitalijus Kozys, Danielius Lavrinovičius, Ignas Sargiūnas, Lukas Uleckas, Tadas Vaičiūnas, Arnas Velička, Julius Daugėla, Ernestas Jonkus, Erikas Venskus (Head coach: Gediminas Petrauskas)
