= Basketball at the 1995 European Youth Summer Olympic Days =

- Venue: University of Bath; Bath, United Kingdom
- Date: 9-14 July 1995
- Nations: 8

Basketball at the 1995 European Youth Summer Olympic Days was held at the University of Bath in Bath, United Kingdom from 9 to 14 July 1995. There was no girls' competition at the 1995 edition of the Days.

== Medalists and final rankings ==
Rank	Team	Record
1st place, gold medalist(s)	Greece	4–0
2nd place, silver medalist(s)	Spain	3–1
3rd place, bronze medalist(s)	Croatia	3–1
4	Yugoslavia	2–2
5	Estonia	2–2
6	Iceland	1–3
7	France	1–3
8	Great Britain	0–4

== Participating nations ==
Eight nations competed in basketball at the 1995 European Youth Summer Olympic Days:

- Croatia
- Spain
- Estonia
- France
- United Kingdom
- Greece
- Iceland
- (Serbia and Montenegro) FR Yugoslavia

== Boys' tournament ==
=== Group A ===
Pos	Team	Pld	W	L	PF	PA	PD	Pts	Qualification	(Greece)	(Croatia)	(Iceland)	(France)
1	Greece	3	3	0	283	155	+128	6	Gold medal match	—	73–60	128–47	82–48
2	Croatia	3	2	1	227	199	+28	5	Bronze medal match	60–73	—	84–58	83–68
3	Iceland	3	1	2	171	277	−106	4	Fifth place match	47–128	58–84	—	66–65
4	France	3	0	3	181	231	−50	3	Seventh place match	48–82	68–83	65–66	—

=== Group B ===
Pos	Team	Pld	W	L	PF	PA	PD	Pts	Qualification	(Spain)	(Federal Republic of Yugoslavia)	(Estonia)	(United Kingdom)
1	Spain	3	3	0	260	201	+59	6	Gold medal match	—	70–54	91–85	99–62
2	Yugoslavia	3	2	1	196	193	+3	5	Bronze medal match	54–70	—	76–63	66–60
3	Estonia	3	1	2	233	232	+1	4	Fifth place match	85–91	63–76	—	85–65
4	Great Britain (H)	3	0	3	187	250	−63	3	Seventh place match	62–99	60–66	65–85	—

(H) Hosts

=== Final matches ===
Group A	Score	Group B
Gold medal match
Greece	102–84	Spain
Bronze medal match
Croatia	57–44	Yugoslavia
Fifth place match
Iceland	79-86	Estonia
Seventh place match
France	77–65	Great Britain
