= Turkey men's national under-18 and under-19 basketball team =

Youth basketball team representing Turkey

Turkey
- FIBA zone: FIBA Europe
- National federation: Turkish Basketball Federation
- Coach: Gökhan Güney

U19 World Cup
- Appearances: 5
- Medals: Bronze: 2 (2015, 2023)

U18 EuroBasket
- Appearances: 35
- Medals: Gold: 2 (2013, 2014); Silver: 3 (2004, 2005, 2015); Bronze: 2 (2009, 2011)
Home	Away

The Turkey men's national under-18 and under-19 basketball team (Turkish: Ümit Milli Basketbol Takımı) is the national representative for Turkey in international under-18 and under-19 men's basketball tournaments. They are formed and run by the Turkish Basketball Federation.

The team regularly competes at the FIBA U18 EuroBasket, and also won two bronze medals at the FIBA U19 World Cup.

== FIBA U18 EuroBasket ==
=== Record ===
Year	Pos.	Pld	W	L	Ref.
(Italy) 1964	Did not qualify				
(Italy) 1966	Did not qualify				
(Spain) 1968	4th	8	4	4	
(Greece) 1970	11th	7	2	5	
(Socialist Federal Republic of Yugoslavia) 1972	11th	7	1	6	
(France) 1974	13th	9	2	7	
(Spain) 1976	9th	7	3	4	
(Italy) 1978	8th	7	2	5	
(Socialist Federal Republic of Yugoslavia) 1980	9th	7	2	5	
(Bulgaria) 1982	Did not qualify				
(Sweden) 1984	8th	7	2	5	
(Austria) 1986	Did not qualify				
(Socialist Federal Republic of Yugoslavia) 1988	7th	7	3	4	
(Netherlands) 1990	9th	7	3	4	
(Hungary) 1992	Did not qualify				
(Israel) 1994	9th	7	3	4	
(France) 1996	5th	7	5	2	
(Bulgaria) 1998	11th	7	2	5	
(Croatia) 2000	Challenge Round				
(Germany) 2002	5th	8	4	4	
(Spain) 2004	2nd	8	5	3	
(Serbia) 2005	2nd	8	6	2	
(Greece) 2006	4th	8	4	4	
(Spain) 2007	8th	8	3	5	
(Greece) 2008	9th	8	5	3	
(France) 2009	3rd	9	6	3	
(Lithuania) 2010	9th	8	4	4	
(Poland) 2011	3rd	9	6	3	
(Lithuania) (Latvia) 2012	9th	8	4	4	
(Latvia) 2013	1st	9	7	2	
(Turkey) 2014	1st	9	7	2	
(Greece) 2015	2nd	9	7	2	
(Turkey) 2016	12th	6	2	4	
(Slovakia) 2017	4th	7	5	2	
(Latvia) 2018	12th	7	2	5	
(Greece) 2019	2nd	7	5	2	
(Turkey) 2022	2nd	7	5	2	
(Serbia) 2023	5th	7	5	2	
(Finland) 2024	11th	7	2	5	
(Serbia) 2025	8th	7	3	4	
(Italy) 2026	8th	7	4	3	
Total	35/41	265	135	130	

=== Squads ===
- 2004 FIBA Europe Under-18 Championship — Silver Medal
  Caner Şentürk, Yasin Görlük, Semih Erden, Cenk Akyol, Murat Göktaş, Mehmet Yağmur, Polat Kaya, Oğuz Savaş, Engin Bayav, Cem Coşkun, Erhan Yetim and Hakan Demirel. Head coach: (Bosnia and Herzegovina) Nihat İziç.
- 2005 FIBA Europe Under-18 Championship — Silver Medal
  İsmet Hacıoğlu, Yasin Görlük, Caner Öner, Cenk Akyol, Murat Göktaş, Mehmet Yağmur, Can Altıntığ, Bora Paçun, Engin Bayav, Cemal Nalga, Erhan Yetim and Oğuz Savaş. Head coach: (Bosnia and Herzegovina) Nihat İziç.
- 2009 FIBA Europe Under-18 Championship — Bronze Medal
  Firat Töz, Cenk Şekeroğlu, Kevin Kaspar, Şafak Edge, Pertev Öngüner, Rıdvan Çalışkan, Maxim Mutaf, Burak Yüksel, Furkan Aldemir, Murat Erensoy, Enes Kanter and Aydin Okçu. Head coach: (Turkey) Mustafa Derin.
- 2011 FIBA Europe Under-18 Championship — Bronze Medal
  Kenan Sipahi, Erbil Eroğlu, Berkay Candan, Mertcan Özen, Uğur Dokuyan, Samet Geyik, Buğrahan Tuncer, Metin Türen, Onur Çalban, Talat Altunbey, Ramazan Tekin and Tayfun Erülkü. Head coach: (Turkey) Erhan Toker.
- 2013 FIBA Europe Under-18 Championship — Gold Medal
  Kenan Sipahi, Berk Uğurlu, Cedi Osman, Oğulcan Baykan, Metecan Birsen, Emircan Koşut, Egemen Güven, Kartal Özmızrak, Berk Demir, Okben Ulubay, Kerem Kanter and Doğukan Şanlı. Head coach: (Turkey) Taner Günay.
- 2014 FIBA Europe Under-18 Championship — Gold Medal
  Kadir Bayram, Berk Uğurlu, Doğuş Özdemiroğlu, Yiğit Arslan, Tolga Geçim, Oğulcan Baykan, Furkan Korkmaz, Ege Arar, Ayberk Olmaz, Okben Ulubay, Metehan Akyel, Egemen Güven. Head coach: (Turkey) Ömer Uğurata
- 2015 FIBA Europe Under-18 Championship — Silver Medal
  Ömer Al, Erkan Yılmaz, Rıdvan Öncel, Enes Taşkıran, Barış Ülker, Arber Berisha, Furkan Korkmaz, Berkan Durmaz, Erten Gazi, Ercan Bayrak, Ömer Yurtseven, Mümin Tunç. Head coach: (Turkey) Mustafa Derin
- 2019 FIBA Europe Under-18 Championship — Silver Medal
  Ömercan İlyasoğlu, Boran Güler, Tibet Görener, Ömer Küçük, Berkan Aksu, Mustafa Kurtuldum, Atakan Erdek, Alperen Şengün, Furkan Haltalı, Göktuğ Baş, Tarık Sezgün, Adem Bona. Head coach: (Turkey) Derviş Gökhan Güney

== FIBA U19 World Cup ==
=== Record ===
Year	Pos.	Pld	W	L	Ref.
(Brazil) 1979	Did not qualify				
(Spain) 1983	Did not qualify				
(Italy) 1987	Did not qualify				
(Canada) 1991	Did not qualify				
(Greece) 1995	Did not qualify				
(Portugal) 1999	Did not qualify				
(Greece) 2003	8th	8	4	4	
(Serbia) 2007	7th	9	4	5	
(Australia) 2009	Did not qualify				
(Latvia) 2011	Did not qualify				
(Czech Republic) 2013	Did not qualify				
(Greece) 2015	3rd	7	6	1	
(Egypt) 2017	Did not qualify				
(Greece) 2019	Did not qualify				
(Latvia) 2021	9th	7	5	2	
(Hungary) 2023	3rd	7	6	1	
(Switzerland) 2025	Did not qualify				
(Czech Republic) 2027	Did not qualify				
(Indonesia) 2029	To be determined				
Total	4/19	38	25	13	

=== Squads ===
- 2015 FIBA U19 World Cup — Bronze Medal
  Kadir Bayram, Berk Uğurlu, Doğuş Özdemiroğlu, Yiğit Arslan, Tolga Geçim, Oğulcan Baykan, Furkan Korkmaz, Ege Arar, Ayberk Olmaz, Okben Ulubay, Mehmet Alemdaroğlu, Egemen Güven (C), Head coach: (Turkey) Ömer Uğurata

== See also ==
- Turkey men's national basketball team
- Turkey men's national under-20 basketball team
- Turkey men's national under-16 and under-17 basketball team
- Turkey women's national under-18 basketball team
