= Ivan Perinčić =

Croatian basketball coach and player

Bosna
- Title: Assistant coach
- League: Bosnian League; ABA League

Personal information
- Born: 11 February 1977 (age 49) Zadar, SR Croatia, Yugoslavia
- Listed height: 2.09 m (6 ft 10 in)
- Listed weight: 100 kg (220 lb)

Career information
- NBA draft: 1999: undrafted
- Playing career: 1996–2012
- Position: Power forward
- Number: 7, 9, 11
- Coaching career: 2015–present

Career history

Playing
- 1996–1998: Zadar
- 1998–2000: Zagreb
- 2000–2001: Zadar
- 2001–2002: Progresso Castelmaggiore
- 2002–2003: Zagreb
- 2003–2004: Türk Telekom
- 2004–2005: Dubrava
- 2005–2006: Cibona VIP
- 2006–2007: Mlékárna Kunín
- 2007–2008: Široki HT Eronet
- 2008–2009: Falco Szombathely
- 2010–2012: Zabok

Coaching
- 2015–2017: Zabok (assistant)
- 2017–2018: Zabok
- 2018–2019: Cedevita (assistant)
- 2019–2020: Gorica (assistant)
- 2020–2021: Zadar (assistant)
- 2021: Zadar
- 2025–2026: Limoges CSP (assistant)
- 2026–present: Bosna (assistant)

Career highlights
- As player: Croatian League champion (2006); Croatian Cup winner (1998); Bosnian Cup winner (2008); As assistant coach: Croatian League champion (2021); 2× Croatian Cup winner (2019, 2021)
Medals
Men's basketball
Representing Croatia
European U-18 Championship
Silver medal – second place	1994 Israel	Under-18

Ivan Perinčić (born 11 February 1977) is a Croatian professional basketball coach and former player. He currently serves as the assistant coach for Bosna of the Bosnian League and the ABA League.

== Playing career ==
Perinčić grew up with a youth system of his hometown team Zadar. A power forward, he spent his playing career in Croatia, Italy, Turkey, Bosnia and Herzegovina, the Czech Republic, and Hungary. During his playing days, he played for Zadar, Progresso Castelmaggiore, Zagreb, Türk Telekom, Dubrava, Cibona, Mlékárna Kunín, Široki, Falco Szombathely, and Zabok. He retired as a player with Zabok in 2012.

== National team career ==
In July 1994, Perinčić was a member of the Croatia under-18 team that won the silver medal at the FIBA Europe Under-18 Championship in Tel Aviv, Israel. Over four tournament games, he averaged 8.2 points per game. In July 1995, Perinčić was a member of the Croatia under-19 team that won fourth place at the FIBA Under-19 World Championship in Greece. Over eight tournament games, he averaged five points, 3.1 rebounds, and one assist per game.

== Coaching career ==
In July 2017, Zabok hired Perinčić as their new head coach. He left Zabok in July 2018 and became an assistant coach for Cedevita under Sito Alonso. In the 2019–20 season, he was an assistant coach for Gorica under Josip Sesar.

In July 2020, Perinčić became an assistant coach for Zadar under Veljko Mršić. On 15 July 2021, Zadar promoted Perinčić as the new head coach following departure of Veljko Mršić. On 18 October, Zadar fired Perinčić after a disappointing (0–4) ABA League season opening.

On June 11, 2025, he signed with Limoges CSP of the LNB Pro A as an assistant coach.

== Personal life ==
Perinčić comes from a basketball-playing family; his father is Čedomir Ćiro Perinčić, a retired basketball player, a semifinalist of the 1974–75 FIBA European Champions Cup with Zadar, and today a basketball coach; his aunt, Sonja, is also a retired basketball player for ŽKK Zadar, ŽKK Split, and for the junior's Yugoslavia national team; and his brother is Hrvoje Perinčić, also retired basketball player and now coach, working in the youth system of KK ABC Zadar.

== Career achievements ==
As player

- Croatian League champion: 1 (with Cibona: 2005–06)
- Croatian Cup winner: 1 (with Zadar: 1997–98)
- Bosnian Cup winner: 1 (with Široki: 2007–08)

As assistant coach

- Croatian League champion: 1 (with Zadar: 2020–21)
- Croatian Cup winner: 2 (Cedevita: 2018–19; with Zadar: 2020–21)
