= Greece men's national under-18 basketball team =

Greece
- Joined FIBA: 1932
- FIBA zone: FIBA Europe
- National federation: Hellenic Basketball Federation

U18 EuroBasket
- Appearances: 37
- Medals: Gold: 2 (2008, 2015); Silver: 2 (1970, 2007); Bronze: 3 (1998, 2000, 2002)
Home	Away

The Greece men's under-18 national basketball team (Greek: Εθνική ομάδα καλαθοσφαίρισης Εφήβων Κ-18 Ελλάδας, Greece youth U-18 men's national basketball team) is the representative national basketball team of Greece in international men's youth basketball competitions, such as the FIBA U18 EuroBasket. It is organized and run by the Hellenic Basketball Federation.

== FIBA U18 EuroBasket participations ==
Year	Position
(Italy) 1964	Did not participate
(Italy) 1966	Did not participate
(Spain) 1968	6th
(Greece) 1970	2nd place, silver medalist(s)
(Socialist Federal Republic of Yugoslavia) 1972	9th
(France) 1974	7th
(Spain) 1976	7th
(Italy) 1978	6th
(Socialist Federal Republic of Yugoslavia) 1980	Did not participate
(Bulgaria) 1982	Did not participate
(Sweden) 1984	9th
(Austria) 1986	6th
(Socialist Federal Republic of Yugoslavia) 1988	4th
(Netherlands) 1990	8th

Year	Position
(Hungary) 1992	4th
(Israel) 1994	6th
(France) 1996	7th
(Bulgaria) 1998	3rd place, bronze medalist(s)
(Croatia) 2000	3rd place, bronze medalist(s)
(Germany) 2002	3rd place, bronze medalist(s)
(Spain) 2004	7th
(Serbia) 2005	13th
(Greece) 2006	6th
(Spain) 2007	2nd place, silver medalist(s)
(Greece) 2008	1st place, gold medalist(s)
(France) 2009	13th
(Lithuania) 2010	8th
(Poland) 2011	14th

Year	Position
(Lithuania) (Latvia) 2012	11th
(Latvia) 2013	11th
(Turkey) 2014	4th
(Greece) 2015	1st place, gold medalist(s)
(Turkey) 2016	9th
(Slovakia) 2017	7th
(Latvia) 2018	14th
(Greece) 2019	4th
(Turkey) 2022	12th
(Serbia) 2023	7th
(Finland) 2024	10th
(Serbia) 2025	11th
(Italy) 2026	6th
Total	37/41

== See also ==
- Greece men's national basketball team
- Greece men's national under-19 basketball team
- Greece men's national under-17 basketball team
- Greece women's national under-18 basketball team
