= Italy men's national under-18 and under-19 basketball team =

Italy
- FIBA zone: FIBA Europe
- National federation: Federazione Italiana Pallacanestro

U19 World Cup
- Appearances: 8
- Medals: Silver: 2 (1991, 2017); Bronze: 1 (1987)

U18 EuroBasket
- Appearances: 40
- Medals: Gold: 1 (1990); Silver: 5 (1972, 1984, 1988, 1992, 2026); Bronze: 9 (1964, 1966, 1968, 1970, 1974, 1986, 2005, 2016, 2025)
Home	Away

The Italy men's national under-18 and under-19 basketball team is a national basketball team of Italy, administered by the Italian Basketball Federation. It represents the country in international under-18 and under-19 men's basketball competitions.

The team regularly competes at the FIBA U18 EuroBasket, and also won three medals at the FIBA U19 World Cup.

== Competitive record ==
=== FIBA U18 EuroBasket ===
Year	Position
(Italy) 1964	3rd
(Italy) 1966	3rd
(Spain) 1968	3rd
(Greece) 1970	3rd
(Socialist Federal Republic of Yugoslavia) 1972	2nd
(France) 1974	3rd
(Spain) 1976	5th
(Italy) 1978	5th
(Socialist Federal Republic of Yugoslavia) 1980	5th
(Bulgaria) 1982	4th
(Sweden) 1984	2nd
(Austria) 1986	3rd
(Socialist Federal Republic of Yugoslavia) 1988	2nd
(Netherlands) 1990	1st

Year	Position
(Hungary) 1992	2nd
(Israel) 1994	4th
(France) 1996	6th
(Bulgaria) 1998	12th
(Croatia) 2000	4th
(Germany) 2002	CR
(Spain) 2004	4th
(Serbia) 2005	3rd
(Greece) 2006	7th
(Spain) 2007	13th
(Greece) 2008	11th
(France) 2009	7th
(Lithuania) 2010	12th
(Poland) 2011	4th

Year	Position
(Lithuania) 2012	7th
(Latvia) 2013	10th
(Turkey) 2014	6th
(Greece) 2015	11th
(Turkey) 2016	3rd
(Slovakia) 2017	5th
(Latvia) 2018	10th
(Greece) 2019	9th
(Turkey) 2022	6th
(Serbia) 2023	9th
(Finland) 2024	9th
(Serbia) 2025	3rd
(Italy) 2026	2nd
Total	40/41

=== FIBA U19 World Cup ===
Year	Position
(Brazil) 1979	6th
(Spain) 1983	6th
(Italy) 1987	3rd
(Canada) 1991	2nd
(Greece) 1995	13th
(Portugal) 1999	Did not qualify
(Greece) 2003	Did not qualify
(Serbia) 2007	Did not qualify
(New Zealand) 2009	Did not qualify
(Latvia) 2011	Did not qualify
(Czech Republic) 2013	Did not qualify

Year	Position
(Greece) 2015	6th
(Egypt) 2017	2nd
(Greece) 2019	Did not qualify
(Latvia) 2021	Did not qualify
(Hungary) 2023	Did not qualify
(Switzerland) 2025	Did not qualify
(Czech Republic) 2027	Qualified
(Indonesia) 2029	TBD
Total	8/19

== See also ==
- Italy men's national basketball team
- Italy men's national under-20 basketball team
- Italy men's national under-16 and under-17 basketball team
- Italy women's national under-19 basketball team
