= Germany men's national under-19 basketball team =

Youth basketball team representing Germany

Germany
- FIBA zone: FIBA Europe
- National federation: Deutscher Basketball Bund (DBB)

U19 World Cup
- Appearances: 5
- Medals: Silver: 1 (2025)

U18 EuroBasket
- Appearances: 32
- Medals: Gold: 1 (2024); Bronze: 1 (2023)

U18 EuroBasket Division B
- Appearances: 2
- Medals: Gold: 1 (2014)
Home	Away

The Germany men's national under-18 and under-19 basketball team is the basketball side that represents Germany in international under-18 and under-19 men's competitions. It is administered by the German Basketball Federation (Deutscher Basketball Bund).

In 2023, Germany won their first ever medal at the FIBA U18 European Championship Division A. The following year, after first ever medal won at the FIBA U18 EuroBasket, Germany won its first title in FIBA U18 EuroBasket Division A.

== Tournament participations ==
=== FIBA U19 World Cup ===
Year	Result
1983	5th
1987	4th
2017	5th
2025	2nd place, silver medalist(s)
2027	Qualified

=== FIBA U18 EuroBasket ===
Year	Result in Division A
1968	11th
1970	10th
1974	14th
1976	11th
1980	6th
1982	5th
1984	5th
1986	4th
1988	9th
1990	12th
1992	7th
1994	12th
1996	8th
2002	12th
2005	14th
2006	13th
2007	9th

Year	Result in Division A	Result in Division B
2008	14th	
2009	11th	
2010	13th	
2011	11th	
2012	14th	
2013		11th
2014		1st place, gold medalist(s)
2015	8th	
2016	4th	
2017	11th	
2018	6th	
2019	11th	
2022	11th	
2023	3rd place, bronze medalist(s)	
2024	1st place, gold medalist(s)	
2025	7th	
2026	5th	

== See also ==
- Germany men's national basketball team
- Germany men's national under-17 basketball team
- Germany women's national under-19 basketball team
