= 2013 FIBA Europe Under-18 Championship =

International basketball competition

2013 FIBA U18 European Championship
30th FIBA Under-18 European Basketball Championship

Tournament details
- Host country: Latvia
- Dates: 18 – 28 July 2013
- Teams: 16 (from 1 federation)
- Venue: 3 (in 3 host cities)

Final positions
- Champions: Turkey (1st title)

Tournament statistics
- MVP: (Turkey) Kenan Sipahi
- Top scorer: (Bulgaria) Vezenkov (22.4)
- Top rebounds: (Lithuania) Sabonis (11.4)
- Top assists: (Slovenia) Rebec (8.1)
- PPG (Team): Serbia (77.6)
- RPG (Team): Serbia (47.7)
- APG (Team): Slovenia (15.7)

Official website
- www.fibaeurope.com

The 2013 FIBA Europe Under-18 Championship was the 30th edition of the FIBA Europe Under-18 Championship. 16 teams participated in the competition, held in Latvia, from 18 to 28 July 2013. Croatia were the defending champions. Turkey became the new champions, taking their first title.

== Participating teams ==
- Bosnia and Herzegovina ▲ (Winners, 2012 FIBA Europe Under-18 Championship Division B)
- Bulgaria
- Croatia
- Czech Republic ▲ (Runners-up, 2012 FIBA Europe Under-18 Championship Division B)
- England ▲ (3rd place, 2012 FIBA Europe Under-18 Championship Division B)
- France
- Greece
- Italy
- Latvia
- Lithuania
- Russia
- Serbia
- Slovenia
- Spain
- Turkey
- Ukraine

== First round ==
The first-round groups draw took place on 8 December 2012 in Freising, Germany. In the first round, the sixteen teams were allocated in four groups of four teams each. The top three teams of each group qualified for the Second Round. The last team of each group played in the Classification Group G first, then in the 9th–16th place playoffs.

Team advances to the Second Round
Team will compete in the Classification Group G

Times below are in CEST (UTC+2).

=== Group A ===
Team	Pld	W	L	PF	PA	PD	Pts
France	3	3	0	198	171	+27	6
Lithuania	3	2	1	206	206	0	5
Serbia	3	1	2	220	195	+25	4
Slovenia	3	0	3	176	228	−52	3

18 July 2013
14:00

Report

Lithuania	58–67	France
Scoring by quarter: 11–16, 11–17, 23–16, 13–18

Ventspils Olympic Center, Ventspils
Attendance: 100

18 July 2013
16:15

Report

Serbia	88–56	Slovenia
Scoring by quarter: 22–10, 24–11, 18–17, 24–18

Ventspils Olympic Center, Ventspils
Attendance: 80

19 July 2013
14:00

Report

Slovenia	69–74	Lithuania
Scoring by quarter: 30–12, 7–22, 20–13, 12–27

Ventspils Olympic Center, Ventspils
Attendance: 100

19 July 2013
16:15

Report

France	65–62	Serbia
Scoring by quarter: 16–22, 16–16, 20–14, 13–10

Ventspils Olympic Center, Ventspils
Attendance: 60

20 July 2013
14:00

Report

Slovenia	51–66	France
Scoring by quarter: 10–25, 17–9, 16–14, 8–18

Ventspils Olympic Center, Ventspils
Attendance: 50

20 July 2013
18:30

Report

Lithuania	74–70 (OT)	Serbia
Scoring by quarter: 16–22, 15–12, 18–22, 15–8, Overtime: 10–6

Ventspils Olympic Center, Ventspils
Attendance: 150

=== Group B ===
Team	Pld	W	L	PF	PA	PD	Pts
Russia	3	2	1	209	198	+11	5
Czech Republic	3	2	1	206	203	+3	5
Bosnia and Herzegovina	3	1	2	172	188	−16	4
Greece	3	1	2	192	190	+2	4

18 July 2013
18:45

Report

Greece	67–68	Czech Republic
Scoring by quarter: 13–17, 15–12, 16–18, 23–21

Ventspils Olympic Center, Ventspils
Attendance: 131

18 July 2013
21:00

Report

Russia	68–55	Bosnia and Herzegovina
Scoring by quarter: 16–20, 12–7, 22–10, 18–18
Pts: Martynov, Maleyko 13; Rebs: Gankevich 8 Asts: Martynov 5		Pts: Polutak 12; Rebs: Polutak 9 Asts: Lulić 3

Ventspils Olympic Center, Ventspils
Attendance: 30
Referees: José Martin (ESP), Igor Dragojević (MNE), Marin Mehandijev (BUL)

19 July 2013
18:30

Report

Bosnia and Herzegovina	52–51	Greece
Scoring by quarter: 8–6, 15–13, 8–13, 21–19
Pts: Lazić 13; Rebs: Polutak 7 Asts: Gačić 4		Pts: Diamantakos 13; Rebs: Mitoglou, Diamantakos 11; Asts: Stamatis 3

Ventspils Olympic Center, Ventspils
Attendance: 100
Referees: Sergiy Zashchuk (UKR), Ingus Baumanis (LAT), Tonči Anzulović (CRO)

19 July 2013
20:45

Report

Czech Republic	69–71	Russia
Scoring by quarter: 24–18, 24–20, 14–12, 7–21

Ventspils Olympic Center, Ventspils
Attendance: 80

20 July 2013
16:15

Report

Greece	74–70	Russia
Scoring by quarter: 19–21, 17–10, 20–18, 18–21

Ventspils Olympic Center, Ventspils
Attendance: 80

20 July 2013
20:45

Report

Bosnia and Herzegovina	65–69	Czech Republic
Scoring by quarter: 16–14, 10–14, 23–16, 16–25
Pts: Lulić 13; Rebs: Karamatić 12; Asts: Zahiragić 6		Pts: Pechanek 18; Rebs: Peterka 11; Asts: Kouril 4

Ventspils Olympic Center, Ventspils
Attendance: 80
Referees: Jose Martin (ESP), Emin Mogulkoc (TUR), Bert Van Slooten (NED)

=== Group C ===
Team	Pld	W	L	PF	PA	PD	Pts
Spain	3	2	1	218	184	+34	5
Latvia	3	2	1	220	188	+32	5
Italy	3	2	1	228	205	+23	5
Bulgaria	3	0	3	162	251	−89	3

18 July 2013
16:15

Report

Italy	61–88	Spain
Scoring by quarter: 16–28, 16–16, 16–24, 13–20

Liepāja Olympic Center, Liepāja
Attendance: 200

18 July 2013
18:45

Report

Latvia	85–57	Bulgaria
Scoring by quarter: 24–20, 27–15, 18–12, 16–10

Liepāja Olympic Center, Liepāja
Attendance: 800

19 July 2013
14:00

Report

Bulgaria	48–97	Italy
Scoring by quarter: 6–17, 14–30, 16–27, 12–23

Liepāja Olympic Center, Liepāja
Attendance: 150

19 July 2013
18:30

Report

Spain	61–66	Latvia
Scoring by quarter: 11–13, 14–15, 19–19, 17–19

Liepāja Olympic Center, Liepāja
Attendance: 1500

20 July 2013
14:00

Report

Bulgaria	57–69	Spain
Scoring by quarter: 18–19, 11–24, 14–14, 14–12

Liepāja Olympic Center, Liepāja
Attendance: 200

20 July 2013
18:30

Report

Italy	70–69	Latvia
Scoring by quarter: 20–15, 23–26, 8–17, 19–11

Liepāja Olympic Center, Liepāja
Attendance: 1000

=== Group D ===
Team	Pld	W	L	PF	PA	PD	Pts
Turkey	3	2	1	248	223	+25	5
Croatia	3	2	1	246	198	+48	5
England	3	1	2	216	246	−30	4
Ukraine	3	1	2	219	262	−43	4

18 July 2013
14:00

Report

Ukraine	49–81	Croatia
Scoring by quarter: 8–16, 15–14, 14–26, 12–25

Liepāja Olympic Center, Liepāja
Attendance: 150

18 July 2013
21:00

Report

Turkey	76–58	England
Scoring by quarter: 21–18, 13–18, 21–16, 21–6

Liepāja Olympic Center, Liepāja
Attendance: 150

19 July 2013
16:15

Report

England	93–81	Ukraine
Scoring by quarter: 21–22, 13–19, 25–16, 34–24

Liepāja Olympic Center, Liepāja
Attendance: 700

19 July 2013
20:45

Report

Croatia	76–84	Turkey
Scoring by quarter: 27–22, 18–21, 12–22, 19–19

Liepāja Olympic Center, Liepāja
Attendance: 200

20 July 2013
16:15

Report

Ukraine	89–88 (OT)	Turkey
Scoring by quarter: 23–23, 16–13, 14–28, 23–12, Overtime: 13–12

Liepāja Olympic Center, Liepāja
Attendance: 200

20 July 2013
20:45

Report

England	65–89	Croatia
Scoring by quarter: 12–21, 21–25, 12–24, 20–19

Liepāja Olympic Center, Liepāja
Attendance: 80

== Second round ==
Twelve advancing teams from the First Round were allocated in two groups of six teams each. The top four teams of each group advanced to the quarterfinals. The last two teams of each group played for the 9th–16th place against the teams from the Group G.

Team advances to the Quarterfinals
Team will compete in 9th – 16th Place Playoff

=== Group E ===
Team	Pld	W	L	PF	PA	PD	Pts
Russia	5	4	1	334	345	−11	9
France	5	3	2	323	305	+18	8
Lithuania	5	3	2	365	322	+43	8
Serbia	5	3	2	410	317	+93	8
Czech Republic	5	2	3	338	402	−64	7
Bosnia and Herzegovina	5	0	5	273	352	−79	5

22 July 2013
16:15

Report

Czech Republic	57–96	Lithuania
Scoring by quarter: 9–30, 20–18, 20–26, 8–22

Ventspils Olympic Center, Ventspils
Attendance: 75

22 July 2013
18:30

Report

Bosnia and Herzegovina	42–60	France
Scoring by quarter: 10–18, 16–13, 12–17, 4–12

Ventspils Olympic Center, Ventspils
Attendance: 100

22 July 2013
20:45

Report

Serbia	102–57	Russia
Scoring by quarter: 21–18, 18–7, 34–16, 29–16

Ventspils Olympic Center, Ventspils
Attendance: 80

23 July 2013
16:15

Report

Bosnia and Herzegovina	51–77	Serbia
Scoring by quarter: 9–22, 7–23, 14–17, 21–15

Ventspils Olympic Center, Ventspils
Attendance: 30

23 July 2013
18:30

Report

France	71–73	Czech Republic
Scoring by quarter: 15–21, 20–21, 21–12, 15–19

Ventspils Olympic Center, Ventspils
Attendance: 80

23 July 2013
20:45

Report

Lithuania	59–68	Russia
Scoring by quarter: 7–18, 18–15, 9–15, 25–20

Ventspils Olympic Center, Ventspils
Attendance: 300

24 July 2013
16:15

Report

Czech Republic	70–99	Serbia
Scoring by quarter: 16–23, 17–25, 21–25, 16–26

Ventspils Olympic Center, Ventspils
Attendance: 50

24 July 2013
18:30

Report

Lithuania	78–60	Bosnia and Herzegovina
Scoring by quarter: 20–15, 23–16, 16–12, 19–17

Ventspils Olympic Center, Ventspils
Attendance: 60

24 July 2013
20:45

Report

Russia	70–60	France
Scoring by quarter: 19–16, 9–17, 16–13, 26–14

Ventspils Olympic Center, Ventspils
Attendance: 100

=== Group F ===
Team	Pld	W	L	PF	PA	PD	Pts
Turkey	5	4	1	367	340	+27	9
Latvia	5	3	2	337	316	+21	8
Spain	5	3	2	355	333	+22	8
Croatia	5	2	3	385	363	+22	7
Italy	5	2	3	334	361	−27	7
England	5	1	4	291	356	−65	6

22 July 2013
16:15

Report

Italy	68–75	Turkey
Scoring by quarter: 18–26, 21–11, 17–17, 12–21

Liepāja Olympic Center, Liepāja
Attendance: 200

22 July 2013
18:30

Report

Croatia	65–72	Latvia
Scoring by quarter: 20–19, 13–17, 10–18, 22–18

Liepāja Olympic Center, Liepāja
Attendance: 1000

22 July 2013
18:30

Report

England	75–66 (OT)	Spain
Scoring by quarter: 18–14, 10–19, 17–20, 18–10, Overtime: 12–3

Liepāja Olympic Center, Liepāja
Attendance: 150

23 July 2013
16:15

Report

Spain	64–63	Croatia
Scoring by quarter: 11–17, 24–20, 17–8, 12–18

Liepāja Olympic Center, Liepāja
Attendance: 600

23 July 2013
18:30

Report

Latvia	62–64	Turkey
Scoring by quarter: 20–13, 14–17, 13–17, 15–17

Liepāja Olympic Center, Liepāja
Attendance: 1700

23 July 2013
20:45

Report

England	37–57	Italy
Scoring by quarter: 2–12, 14–12, 8–12, 13–21

Liepāja Olympic Center, Liepāja
Attendance: 80

24 July 2013
16:15

Turkey	68–76	Spain
Scoring by quarter: 14–18, 22–15, 18–21, 14–22

Liepāja Olympic Center, Liepāja
Attendance: 400

24 July 2013
18:30

Report

Latvia	68–56	England
Scoring by quarter: 17–13, 20–8, 19–17, 12–18

Liepāja Olympic Center, Liepāja
Attendance: 1300

24 July 2013
20:45

Croatia	92–78	Italy
Scoring by quarter: 21–18, 19–12, 31–25, 21–23Report

Liepāja Olympic Center, Liepāja
Attendance: 200

== Classification Group G ==
The last team of each group of the First Round competed in this Classification Round.

Team	Pld	W	L	PF	PA	PD	Pts
Greece	3	3	0	240	178	+62	6
Ukraine	3	2	1	182	192	−10	5
Slovenia	3	1	2	207	218	−11	4
Bulgaria	3	0	3	198	239	−41	3

22 July 2013
16:15

Report

Slovenia	60–65	Ukraine
Scoring by quarter: 12–15, 23–12, 18–15, 7–23

Grobiņa Sport Hall, Grobiņa
Attendance: 80

22 July 2013
18:30

Report

Greece	88–65	Bulgaria
Scoring by quarter: 22–19, 13–13, 28–15, 25–18

Grobiņa Sport Hall, Grobiņa
Attendance: 70

23 July 2013
16:15

Report

Bulgaria	77–85	Slovenia
Scoring by quarter: 22–22, 15–15, 30–23, 10–25

Grobiņa Sport Hall, Grobiņa
Attendance: 30

23 July 2013
18:30

Report

Ukraine	51–76	Greece
Scoring by quarter: 13–16, 15–11, 9–34, 14–15

Grobiņa Sport Hall, Grobiņa
Attendance: 50

24 July 2013
16:15

Slovenia	62–76	Greece
Scoring by quarter: 10–19, 20–13, 22–21, 10–23

Grobiņa Sport Hall, Grobiņa
Attendance: 50

24 July 2013
18:30

Bulgaria	56–66	Ukraine
Scoring by quarter: 18–14, 21–22, 10–8, 7–22

Grobina Sport Hall, Grobiņa
Attendance: 60

== Classification playoffs for 9th – 16th place ==
13th place match
E6	Bosnia and Herzegovina	96 OT
G2	Ukraine	85
15th place match
G4	Bulgaria	82
G3	Slovenia	75

13th – 16th place playoffs
G4	Bulgaria	57
E6	Bosnia and Herzegovina	72
G3	Slovenia	63
G2	Ukraine	68

9th – 16th place playoffs
F5	Italy	67
G4	Bulgaria	57
E6	Bosnia and Herzegovina	36
G1	Greece	63
E5	Czech Republic	87
G3	Slovenia	79
F6	England	71
G2	Ukraine	58

9th – 12th place playoffs
F5	Italy	82
G1	Greece	62
E5	Czech Republic	62
F6	England	85

9th place match
F5	Italy	59
F6	England	69
11th place match
G1	Greece	85
E5	Czech Republic	65

=== Classification games for 9th – 16th place ===
26 July 2013
14:00

Boxscore

Italy	67–57	Bulgaria
Scoring by quarter: 25–20, 20–8, 10–22, 12–7
Scoring by half: 45–28

Olympic Sports Centre, Riga
Attendance: 50
Referees: Emin Mogulkoc (TUR), Haris Bijedić (BIH), Leonardo Damian Zalazar (ARG)

26 July 2013
20:45

Boxscore

Bosnia and Herzegovina	36–63	Greece
Scoring by quarter: 10–19, 7–15, 13–14, 6–15
Scoring by half: 17–34

Olympic Sports Centre, Riga
Attendance: 20
Referees: Ivo Dolinek (CZE), Alexey Davydov (RUS), Bernard Vassallo (MLT)

26 July 2013
16:15

Boxscore

Czech Republic	87–79	Slovenia
Scoring by quarter: 20–15, 22–24, 20–23, 25–17
Scoring by half: 42–39

Olympic Sports Centre, Riga
Attendance: 60
Referees: Marko Juras (SRB), Jurgis Laurinavicius (LTU), Anastasios Manos (GRE)

26 July 2013
18:30

Boxscore

England	71–58	Ukraine
Scoring by quarter: 4–15, 17–15, 21–15, 19–13
Scoring by half: 21–30

Olympic Sports Centre, Riga
Attendance: 25
Referees: Marco Giansanti (ITA), Marko Vučkovič (SLO), Marin Mehandjiev (BUL)

=== Classification games for 13th – 16th place ===
27 July 2013
14:00

Boxscore

Bulgaria	57–72	Bosnia and Herzegovina
Scoring by quarter: 16–12, 14–17, 9–25, 18–18
Scoring by half: 30–29

Olympic Sports Centre, Riga
Attendance: 50
Referees: Marco Giansanti (ITA), Haydn Jones (WAL), Leonardo Damian Zalazar (ARG)

27 July 2013
16:15

Boxscore

Slovenia	63–68	Ukraine
Scoring by quarter: 11–13, 16–19, 19–14, 17–22
Scoring by half: 27–32

Olympic Sports Centre, Riga
Attendance: 50
Referees: David Chambon (FRA), Bert Van Slooten (NED), Luis Miguel Gallardo Oyaneder (NZL)

=== Classification games for 9th – 12th place ===
27 July 2013
18:30

Boxscore

Italy	82–62	Greece
Scoring by quarter: 18–21, 20–12, 20–18, 24–11
Scoring by half: 38–33

Olympic Sports Centre, Riga
Attendance: 30
Referees: Zoran Šutulović (MNE), Ademir Zurapović (BIH), Marin Mehandjiev (BUL)

27 July 2013
20:45

Boxscore

Czech Republic	62–85	England
Scoring by quarter: 19–20, 16–23, 18–19, 9–23
Scoring by half: 35–43

Olympic Sports Centre, Riga
Attendance: 40
Referees: Tomasz Trawicki (POL), Tonči Anzulović (CRO), Haris Bijedić (BIH)

== 1st – 8th Place Playoff ==
Quarter-finals
26 July 2013 – 14:00
Russia	72
Croatia	82
26 July 2013 – 18:30
Latvia	71
Lithuania	54
26 July 2013 – 16:15
Turkey	71
Serbia	67
26 July 2013 – 20:45
France	59
Spain	68

Semi-finals
27 July 2013 – 18:30
Croatia	72
Latvia	68
27 July 2013 – 20:45
Turkey	77
Spain	75

Final
28 July 2013 – 20:45
Croatia	74
Turkey	81
Third place
28 July 2013 – 18:30
Latvia	56
Spain	57

5–8th place bracket

5–8th place semifinals
27 July – 14:00
Russia	77
Lithuania	84
27 July – 16:15
Serbia	77
France	66

Fifth place
28 July – 16:15
Lithuania	63
Serbia	56
Seventh place
28 July – 14:00
Russia	51
France	89

=== Quarterfinals ===
26 July 2013
14:00

Report

Russia	72–82	Croatia
Scoring by quarter: 12–23, 17–21, 19–12, 24–26

Arena Riga, Riga
Attendance: 200

26 July 2013
16:15

Report

Turkey	71–67	Serbia
Scoring by quarter: 17–21, 21–15, 13–13, 20–18

Arena Riga, Riga
Attendance: 170

26 July 2013
18:30

Report

Latvia	71–54	Lithuania
Scoring by quarter: 16–11, 19–24, 21–12, 15–7

Arena Riga, Riga
Attendance: 3 000

26 July 2013
20:45

Report

France	59–68	Spain
Scoring by quarter: 13–18, 13–16, 24–15, 9–19

Arena Riga, Riga
Attendance: 250

=== Semifinals ===
27 July 2013
18:30

Report

Croatia	72–68	Latvia
Scoring by quarter: 18–23, 12–16, 20–9, 22–20

Arena Riga, Riga
Attendance: 2 500

27 July 2013
20:45

Report

Turkey	77–75	Spain
Scoring by quarter: 19–22, 15–19, 10–12, 33–22

Arena Riga, Riga
Attendance: 200

==== Classification games for 5th – 8th place ====
27 July 2013
14:00

Report

Russia	77–84	Lithuania
Scoring by quarter: 24–19, 18–16, 16–22, 19–27

Arena Riga, Riga
Attendance: 100

27 July 2013
16:15

Report

Serbia	77–66	France
Scoring by quarter: 24–17, 12–18, 20–15, 21–16

Arena Riga, Riga
Attendance: 150

== Final classification games ==
=== Match for 15th place ===
28 July 2013
14:00

Report

Bulgaria	82–75	Slovenia
Scoring by quarter: 26–25, 18–19, 19–19, 19–12

Olympic Sports Centre, Riga
Attendance: 40

=== Match for 13th place ===
28 July 2013
16:15

Report

Bosnia and Herzegovina	96–85 (OT)	Ukraine
Scoring by quarter: 16–18, 12–26, 31–16, 15–14, Overtime: 5–5, 17–6

Olympic Sports Centre, Riga
Attendance: 30

=== Match for 11th place ===
28 July 2013
18:30

Report

Greece	85–65	Czech Republic
Scoring by quarter: 17–15, 24–17, 24–12, 20–21

Olympic Sports Centre, Riga
Attendance: 33

=== Match for 9th place ===
28 July 2013
11:45

Report

Italy	59–69	England
Scoring by quarter: 15–11, 14–14, 9–21, 21–23

Olympic Sports Centre, Riga
Attendance: 40

=== Match for 7th place ===
28 July 2013
14:00

Report

Russia	51–89	France
Scoring by quarter: 18–13, 13–29, 9–26, 11–21

Arena Riga, Riga
Attendance: 100

=== Match for 5th place ===
28 July 2013
16:15

Report

Lithuania	63–56	Serbia
Scoring by quarter: 9–13, 19–18, 22–10, 13–15

Arena Riga, Riga
Attendance: 150

=== Bronze medal match ===
28 July 2013
18:30

Report

Latvia	56–57	Spain
Scoring by quarter: 17–12, 15–13, 11–16, 13–16

Arena Riga, Riga
Attendance: 3 000
Referees: Emin Mogulkoc (TUR), Marko Juras (SRB), Bernard Vassallo (MLT)

=== Final ===
28 July 2013
20:45

Report

Croatia	74–81	Turkey
Scoring by quarter: 22–16, 15–22, 18–23, 19–20

Arena Riga, Riga
Attendance: 1500
Referees: Marco Giansanti (ITA), Tomasz Trawicki (POL), Sergiy Zashchuk (UKR)

== Final standings ==
Rank	Team
1st place, gold medalist(s)	Turkey
2nd place, silver medalist(s)	Croatia
3rd place, bronze medalist(s)	Spain
4th	Latvia
5th	Lithuania
6th	Serbia
7th	France
8th	Russia
9th	England
10th	Italy
11th	Greece
12th	Czech Republic
13th	Bosnia and Herzegovina
14th	Ukraine
15th	Bulgaria
16th	Slovenia

2013 FIBA Europe Under-18 Championship winners

Turkey
First title

Team relegated to 2014 Division B

== Awards ==
Most Valuable Player
(Turkey) Kenan Sipahi

All-Tournament Team

- (Turkey) Kenan Sipahi
- (Croatia) Paolo Marinelli
- (Croatia) Domagoj Bošnjak
- (Latvia) Kristaps Porziņģis
- (Latvia) Anžejs Pasečņiks
