= 2005 FIBA Europe Under-18 Championship =

International basketball competition

2005 EuroBasket Under-18
22nd FIBA Europe Under-18 Championship

Tournament details
- Host country: Serbia and Montenegro
- Teams: 16

Final positions
- Champions: Serbia and Montenegro (1st title)

The 2005 FIBA Europe Under-18 Championship was an international basketball competition held in Serbia and Montenegro in 2005.

== Final ranking ==
1. Serbia and Montenegro

2. Turkey

3. Italy

4. Spain

5. Russia

6. France

7. Israel

8. Latvia

9. Lithuania

10. Slovenia

11. Croatia

12. Bulgaria

13. Greece

14. Germany

15. Poland

16. Belgium

== Awards ==
Winners

Serbia and Montenegro
