= 2014 FIBA Europe Under-18 Championship =

International basketball competition

2014 EuroBasket Under-18
31st FIBA Europe Under-18 Championship

Tournament details
- Host country: Turkey
- Dates: 24 July – 3 August 2014
- Teams: 16
- Venue(s): 2 (in 1 host city)

Final positions
- Champions: Turkey (2nd title)

Tournament statistics
- MVP: (Turkey) Egemen Güven
- Top scorer: (Italy) Mussini (22.6)
- Top rebounds: (Spain) Sima (12.1)
- Top assists: (Czech Republic) Pulpan (6.7)
- PPG (Team): Croatia (83.6)
- RPG (Team): Croatia (50.4)
- APG (Team): Croatia (20.0)

Official website
- www.fibaeurope.com

The 2014 FIBA Europe Under-18 Championship was the 31st edition of the FIBA Europe Under-18 Championship. 16 teams participated in the competition, held in Konya, Turkey, from 24 July to 3 August 2014. The tournament served as the qualifying tournament for the 2015 FIBA Under-19 World Championship. Turkey also successfully defended their last year's title.

== Participating teams ==
- Belgium ▲ (3rd place, 2013 FIBA Europe Under-18 Championship Division B)
- Bosnia and Herzegovina
- Croatia
- Czech Republic
- England
- France
- Greece
- Italy
- Latvia
- Lithuania
- Montenegro ▲ (Winners, 2013 FIBA Europe Under-18 Championship Division B)
- Poland ▲ (Runners-up, 2013 FIBA Europe Under-18 Championship Division B)
- Russia
- Serbia
- Spain
- Turkey

== First round ==
The first-round groups draw took place on 1 December 2013 in Freising, Germany. In the first round, the sixteen teams are allocated in four groups of four teams each. The top three teams of each group qualified for the Second Round. The last team of each group will play in the Classification Group G first, then in the 9th–16th place playoffs.

Team advances to the Second round
Team will compete in the Classification Group G

=== Group A ===
Team	Pld	W	L	PF	PA	PD	Pts
Italy	3	2	1	225	202	+23	5
Latvia	3	2	1	190	192	−2	5
Poland	3	1	2	203	213	−10	4
Belgium	3	1	2	194	205	−11	4

24 July 2014
14:00

Italy	72–55	Latvia

24 July 2014
18:30

Poland	67–63	Belgium

25 July 2014
14:00

Belgium	79–75	Italy

25 July 2014
20:45

Latvia	72–68	Poland

26 July 2014
16:15

Italy	78–68	Poland

26 July 2014
18:30

Belgium	52–63	Latvia

=== Group B ===
Team	Pld	W	L	PF	PA	PD	Pts
Croatia	3	3	0	256	175	+81	6
Lithuania	3	2	1	218	222	−4	5
France	3	1	2	207	199	+8	4
England	3	0	3	153	238	−85	3

24 July 2014
16:15

France	72–75	Lithuania

24 July 2014
20:45

Croatia	88–47	England

25 July 2014
16:15

England	45–73	France

25 July 2014
18:30

Lithuania	66–89	Croatia

26 July 2014
14:00

France	62–79	Croatia

26 July 2014
20:45

England	61–77	Lithuania

=== Group C ===
Team	Pld	W	L	PF	PA	PD	Pts
Greece	3	2	1	217	194	+23	5
Bosnia and Herzegovina	3	2	1	214	209	+5	5
Turkey	3	2	1	235	188	+47	5
Czech Republic	3	0	3	173	248	−75	3

24 July 2014
14:00

Greece	78–69	Bosnia and Herzegovina

24 July 2014
20:45

Turkey	101–51	Czech Republic

25 July 2014
16:15

Czech Republic	57–75	Greece

25 July 2014
20:45

Bosnia and Herzegovina	73–66	Turkey

26 July 2014
18:30

Bosnia and Herzegovina	72–65	Czech Republic

26 July 2014
20:45

Turkey	68–64	Greece

=== Group D ===
Team	Pld	W	L	PF	PA	PD	Pts
Montenegro	3	2	1	219	209	+10	5
Serbia	3	2	1	223	194	+29	5
Spain	3	2	1	203	203	0	5
Russia	3	0	3	176	215	−39	3

24 July 2014
16:15

Serbia	79–53	Russia

24 July 2014
18:30

Spain	73–72	Montenegro

25 July 2014
14:00

Montenegro	78–73	Serbia

25 July 2014
18:30

Russia	60–67	Spain

26 July 2014
14:00

Serbia	71–63	Spain

26 July 2014
16:15

Montenegro	69–63	Russia

== Second round ==
Twelve advancing teams from the First Round will be allocated in two groups of six teams each. The top four teams of each group will advance to the quarterfinals. The last two teams of each group will play in the 9th–16th place playoffs against the teams from the Group G.

Team advances to the Quarterfinals
Team will compete in the 9th – 16th place playoffs

=== Group E ===
Team	Pld	W	L	PF	PA	PD	Pts
Croatia	5	5	0	442	346	+96	10
Italy	5	4	1	347	330	+17	9
Latvia	5	3	2	340	367	−27	8
Lithuania	5	2	3	360	374	−14	7
France	5	1	4	331	322	+9	6
Poland	5	0	5	325	406	−81	5

28 July 2014
16:15

France	65–68	Italy

28 July 2014
18:30

Lithuania	76–78	Latvia

28 July 2014
20:45

Poland	81–101	Croatia

29 July 2014
16:15

Italy	64–61	Lithuania

29 July 2014
18:30

France	73–37	Poland

29 July 2014
20:45

Latvia	72–92	Croatia

30 July 2014
16:15

Croatia	81–65	Italy

30 July 2014
18:30

Latvia	63–59	France

30 July 2014
20:45

Lithuania	82–71	Poland

=== Group F ===
Team	Pld	W	L	PF	PA	PD	Pts
Serbia	5	4	1	377	343	+34	9
Turkey	5	3	2	358	353	+5	8
Greece	5	3	2	372	353	+19	8
Spain	5	2	3	376	383	−7	7
Montenegro	5	2	3	343	360	−17	7
Bosnia and Herzegovina	5	1	4	344	378	−34	6

28 July 2014
16:15

Spain	85–89	Greece

28 July 2014
18:30

Serbia	77–71	Bosnia and Herzegovina

28 July 2014
20:45

Turkey	78–63	Montenegro

29 July 2014
16:15

Bosnia and Herzegovina	64–73	Montenegro

29 July 2014
18:30

Greece	69–74	Serbia

29 July 2014
20:45

Spain	71–84	Turkey

30 July 2014
16:15

Montenegro	57–72	Greece

30 July 2014
18:30

Bosnia and Herzegovina	67–84	Spain

30 July 2014
20:45

Serbia	82–62	Turkey

== Classification Group G ==
The last team of each group of the First Round will compete in this classification round.

Team	Pld	W	L	PF	PA	PD	Pts
Russia	3	3	0	211	168	+43	6
Czech Republic	3	2	1	194	186	+8	5
Belgium	3	1	2	206	234	−28	4
England	3	0	3	164	187	−23	3

28 July 2014
14:00

Belgium	65–84	Russia

28 July 2014
14:00

England	50–55	Czech Republic

29 July 2014
14:00

Czech Republic	86–74	Belgium

29 July 2014
14:00

Russia	65–50	England

30 July 2014
14:00

Belgium	67–64	England

30 July 2014
14:00

Czech Republic	53–62	Russia

== Classification playoffs for 9th – 16th place ==
13th place match
G4	England	59
G2	Czech Republic	73
15th place match
E6	Poland	79
G3	Belgium	83

13th – 16th place playoffs
G4	England	83
E6	Poland	74
G3	Belgium	61
G2	Czech Republic	69

9th – 16th place playoffs
F5	Montenegro	85
G4	England	67
E6	Poland	74
G1	Russia	85
E5	France	75
G3	Belgium	60
F6	Bosnia and Herzegovina	87
G2	Czech Republic	77

9th – 12th place playoffs
F5	Montenegro	62
G1	Russia	72
E5	France	68
F6	Bosnia and Herzegovina	52

9th place match
G1	Russia	52
E5	France	77
11th place match
F5	Montenegro	85
F6	Bosnia and Herzegovina	64

=== Classification games for 9th – 16th place ===
1 August 2014
14:00

Report

Montenegro	85–67	England
Scoring by quarter: 20–17, 21–15, 21–14, 23–21
Pts: A. Dožić 21; Rebs: V. Baćović 8 Asts: A. Dožić, M. Krivokapić 4		Pts: J. D. Akodo 18; Rebs: D. Williams 6 Asts: J. D. Akodo 6

Konya Municipality Sports Complex II, Konya
Referees: Carlos Cortes (ESP), Arturas Sukys (LTU), Sergii Tyslenko (UKR)

1 August 2014
16:15

Report

Poland	74–85	Russia
Scoring by quarter: 16–25, 12–19, 19–16, 27–25
Pts: G. Kulka 20; Rebs: G. Kulka 8 Asts: A. Wlodarczyk 8		Pts: D. Sinegubov 21; Rebs: I. Karpenkov 7 Asts: N. Shantaley 5

Konya Municipality Sports Complex II, Konya
Referees: Gianluca Mattioli (ITA), Ersan Kartal (TUR), Irakli Berishvili (GEO)

1 August 2014
18:30

Report

Bosnia and Herzegovina	87–77	Czech Republic
Scoring by quarter: 25–20, 23–12, 19–25, 20–20
Pts: E. Atić 20; Rebs: M. Predić 8 Asts: M. Predić 3		Pts: S. Pursl 19; Rebs: S. Pursl 8 Asts: V. Pulpán 6

Konya Municipality Sports Complex II, Konya
Referees: Georgios Tanatzis (GRE), Andris Aunkrogers (LAT), Pavel Fuska (SVK)

1 August 2014
20:45

Report

France	75–60	Belgium
Scoring by quarter: 19–21, 15–13, 16–16, 25–10
Pts: Y. Smock 17; Rebs: A. Kaba 10; Asts: L. Dussoulier 5		Pts: T. Akyazili 14; Rebs: J. Kohajda 14; Asts: T. Akyazili 7

Konya Municipality Sports Complex II, Konya
Referees: Nikola Perlić (CRO), Miodrag Ličina (SRB), Alakbar Hasanov (AZE)

=== Classification games for 9th – 12th place ===
2 August 2014
18:30

Report

Montenegro	62–72	Russia
Scoring by quarter: 15–20, 18–22, 12–17, 17–13
Pts: Z. Nikolić 12; Rebs: Z. Nikolić 16; Asts: M. Krivokapić 5		Pts: V. Staratelev 16; Rebs: I. Karpenkov 15; Asts: A. Zuev 4

Konya Municipality Sports Complex II, Konya
Referees: Amit Balak (ISR), Vanessa Ann Devlin (AUS), Nick Van den Broeck (BEL)

2 August 2014
20:45

Report

France	68–52	Bosnia and Herzegovina
Scoring by quarter: 14–11, 13–9, 22–13, 19–19
Pts: Y. Smock 20; Rebs: A. Kaba 10; Asts: 3 players tied with 3		Pts: 3 players tied with 9 Rebs: E. Atić 5 Asts: E. Atić 3

Konya Municipality Sports Complex II, Konya
Referees: Paulo Marques (POR), Ciprian Stoica (ROU), Sergii Tyslenko (UKR)

=== Classification games for 13th – 16th place ===
2 August 2014
14:00

Report

England	83–74	Poland
Scoring by quarter: 28–22, 12–18, 27–15, 16–19
Pts: J. D. Akodo 18; Rebs: A. Menzies 15; Asts: J. D. Akodo 8		Pts: G. Kulka, M. Konopatzki 15; Rebs: G. Kulka 10; Asts: A. Wlodarczyk 8

Konya Municipality Sports Complex II, Konya
Referees: Ademir Zurapović (BIH), Andris Aunkrogers (LAT), Alakbar Hasanov (AZE)

2 August 2014
16:15

Report

Belgium	61–69	Czech Republic
Scoring by quarter: 19–17, 10–19, 17–13, 15–20
Pts: T. Akyazili 15; Rebs: M. Houdart 11; Asts: T. Akyazili 3		Pts: M. Svoboda 16; Rebs: V. Pulpán 7 Asts: V. Pulpán 7

Konya Municipality Sports Complex II, Konya
Referees: Miloš Koljenšić (MNE), Arturas Sukys (LTU), Irakli Berishvili (GEO)

== 1st – 8th place playoffs ==
Quarterfinals
1 August 2014 – 18:30
Croatia	80
Spain	55
1 August 2014 – 20:45
Turkey	78
Latvia	53
1 August 2014 – 16:15
Serbia	83
Lithuania	67
1 August 2014 – 14:00
Italy	68
Greece	85

Semifinals
2 August 2014 – 20:45
Croatia	67
Turkey	74
2 August 2014 – 18:30
Serbia	60
Greece	55

Final
3 August 2014 – 20:45
Turkey	85
Serbia	68
Third place
3 August 2014 – 18:30
Croatia	75
Greece	71

5–8th place bracket

5–8th place semifinals
2 August 2014 – 16:15
Spain	83
Latvia	78
2 August 2014 – 14:00
Lithuania	57
Italy	80

Fifth place
3 August 2014 – 16:15
Spain	68
Italy	65
Seventh place
3 August 2014 – 14:00
Latvia	56
Lithuania	90

=== Quarterfinals ===
1 August 2014
14:00

Report

Italy	68–85	Greece
Scoring by quarter: 11–20, 22–19, 20–19, 15–27
Pts: F. Mussini 24; Rebs: F. Mussini, L. Severini 5 Asts: 3 players tied with 2		Pts: V. Charalampopoulos 20; Rebs: V. Charalampopoulos 13; Asts: V. Charalampopoulos 4

Konya Municipality Sports Complex, Konya
Referees: Miloš Koljenšić (MNE), Amit Balak (ISR), Nick Van den Broeck (BEL)

1 August 2014
16:15

Report

Serbia	83–67	Lithuania
Scoring by quarter: 20–15, 21–15, 15–22, 27–15
Pts: V. Vučetić 19; Rebs: V. Vučetić 8 Asts: S. Peno 5		Pts: M. Varnas 12; Rebs: D. Sabonis 19; Asts: D. Sabonis 7

Konya Municipality Sports Complex, Konya
Referees: Gentian Cici (ALB), Janusz Calik (POL), Ciprian Stoica (ROU)

1 August 2014
18:30

Report

Croatia	80–55	Spain
Scoring by quarter: 24–12, 8–15, 23–12, 25–16
Pts: D. Bender 18; Rebs: 4 players tied with 10; Asts: L. Mazalin 7		Pts: M. Garcia 15; Rebs: Y. Sima 10; Asts: D. Gallardo 3

Konya Municipality Sports Complex, Konya
Referees: Leandro Nicolas Lezcano (ARG), Mathieu Hosselet (FRA), Semen Ovinov (RUS)

1 August 2014
20:45

Report

Turkey	78–53	Latvia
Scoring by quarter: 20–16, 19–14, 20–15, 19–8
Pts: F. Korkmaz 22; Rebs: E. Arar 10; Asts: B. Ugurlu 6		Pts: D. Cima 14; Rebs: R. Malmanis 7 Asts: E. Meznieks 3

Konya Municipality Sports Complex, Konya
Referees: Paulo Marques (POR), Ademir Zurapović (BIH), Vanessa Ann Devlin (AUS)

=== Semifinals ===
2 August 2014
18:30

Report

Serbia	60–55	Greece
Scoring by quarter: 11–14, 17–14, 18–12, 14–15
Pts: R. Đoković 21; Rebs: V. Vučetić 12; Asts: I. Đoković 4		Pts: D. Stamatis 22; Rebs: K. Mitoglou 10; Asts: D. Stamatis, V. Charalampopoulos 3

Konya Municipality Sports Complex, Konya
Referees: Carlos Cortes (ESP), Leandro Nicolas Lezcano (ARG), Semen Ovinov (RUS)

2 August 2014
20:45

Report

Croatia	67–74	Turkey
Scoring by quarter: 18–16, 12–15, 18–21, 19–22
Pts: M. Arapović 18; Rebs: M. Arapović 9 Asts: M. Arapović 5		Pts: E. Arar 14; Rebs: E. Arar 10; Asts: B. Ugurlu 7

Konya Municipality Sports Complex, Konya
Referees: Gianluca Mattioli (ITA), Gentian Cici (ALB), Janusz Calik (POL)

==== Classification games for 5th – 8th place ====
2 August 2014
14:00

Report

Lithuania	57–80	Italy
Scoring by quarter: 10–21, 10–20, 16–17, 21–22
Pts: D. Sabonis 23; Rebs: D. Sabonis 10; Asts: D. Sabonis, R. Miniotas 3		Pts: D. Flaccadori 27; Rebs: R. Cattapan 9 Asts: D. Flaccadori 6

Konya Municipality Sports Complex, Konya
Referees: Ersan Kartal (TUR), Nikola Perlić (CRO), Mathieu Hosselet (FRA)

2 August 2014
16:15

Report

Spain	83–78	Latvia
Scoring by quarter: 21–21, 18–23, 21–14, 23–20
Pts: M. Garcia 26; Rebs: Y. Sima 13; Asts: F. Alonso, J. Jimenez 5		Pts: E. Meznieks 26; Rebs: R. Malmanis, R. Lomazs 9 Asts: 3 players tied with 3

Konya Municipality Sports Complex, Konya
Referees: Georgios Tanatzis (GRE), Miodrag Ličina (SRB), Pavel Fuska (SVK)

== Final classification games ==
=== Match for 15th place ===
3 August 2014
14:00

Report

Poland	79–83	Belgium
Scoring by quarter: 16–25, 22–18, 25–18, 16–22
Pts: G. Kulka 18; Rebs: M. Fatz, M. Konopatzki 8 Asts: A. Wlodarczyk 6		Pts: M. Houdart 22; Rebs: 3 players tied with 5 Asts: T. Akyazili 4

Konya Municipality Sports Complex II, Konya
Referees: Arturas Sukys (LTU), Pavel Fuska (SVK), Alakbar Hasanov (AZE)

=== Match for 13th place ===
3 August 2014
16:15

Report

England	59–73	Czech Republic
Scoring by quarter: 21–22, 10–20, 11–17, 17–14
Pts: J. D. Akodo 19; Rebs: D. Williams 8 Asts: J. D. Akodo 4		Pts: M. Svoboda 24; Rebs: D. Skranc 14; Asts: V. Pulpán 13

Konya Municipality Sports Complex II, Konya
Referees: Ademir Zurapović (BIH), Gentian Cici (ALB), Sergii Tyslenko (UKR)

=== Match for 11th place ===
3 August 2014
18:30

Report

Montenegro	85–64	Bosnia and Herzegovina
Scoring by quarter: 22–19, 22–17, 20–13, 21–15
Pts: P. Popović 19; Rebs: Z. Nikolić 15; Asts: P. Popović 11		Pts: D. Hadžić 21; Rebs: E. Memić 5 Asts: N. Đedović 4

Konya Municipality Sports Complex II, Konya
Referees: Carlos Cortes (ESP), Janusz Calik (POL), Vanessa Ann Devlin (AUS)

=== Match for 9th place ===
3 August 2014
20:45

Report

Russia	52–77	France
Scoring by quarter: 11–15, 13–17, 7–25, 21–20
Pts: A. Zuev 11; Rebs: M. Maleyko, I. Karpenkov 4 Asts: K. Pisklov 4		Pts: Y. Smock 19; Rebs: A. Kaba 9 Asts: I. Cordinier 7

Konya Municipality Sports Complex II, Konya
Referees: Georgios Tanatzis (GRE), Nikola Perlić (CRO), Andris Aunkrogers (LAT)

=== Match for 7th place ===
3 August 2014
14:00

Report

Latvia	56–90	Lithuania
Scoring by quarter: 16–27, 10–15, 12–19, 18–29
Pts: R. Stradnieks 17; Rebs: R. Stradnieks 6 Asts: R. Birkans 4		Pts: R. Miniotas 20; Rebs: R. Miniotas 12; Asts: D. Sabonis, M. Normantas 5

Konya Municipality Sports Complex, Konya
Referees: Ademir Zurapović (BIH), Gentian Cici (ALB), Sergii Tyslenko (UKR)

=== Match for 5th place ===
3 August 2014
16:15

Report

Spain	68–65	Italy
Scoring by quarter: 17–18, 15–16, 21–14, 15–17
Pts: M. Garcia 26; Rebs: Y. Sima 18; Asts: F. Alonso 6		Pts: F. Mussini 15; Rebs: D. Flaccadori 7 Asts: F. Mussini 6

Konya Municipality Sports Complex, Konya
Referees: Miloš Koljenšić (MNE), Ciprian Stoica (ROU), Irakli Berishvili (GEO)

=== Bronze medal match ===
3 August 2014
18:30

Report

Croatia	75–71	Greece
Scoring by quarter: 11–19, 19–9, 24–24, 21–19
Pts: L. Mazalin, M. Arapović 24; Rebs: M. Arapović 16; Asts: D. Bender 10		Pts: V. Charalampopoulos 20; Rebs: V. Charalampopoulos 7 Asts: D. Stamatis 4

Konya Municipality Sports Complex, Konya
Referees: Ersan Kartal (TUR), Paulo Marques (POR), Mathieu Hosselet (FRA)

=== Final ===
3 August 2014
20:45

Report

Turkey	85–68	Serbia
Scoring by quarter: 25–11, 11–17, 32–18, 17–22
Pts: T. Geçim 18; Rebs: 4 players tied with 5 Asts: B. Uğurlu 7		Pts: S. Peno 13; Rebs: V. Vučetić, V. Marinković 6 Asts: I. Đoković 3

Konya Municipality Sports Complex, Konya
Attendance: 9 000
Referees: Leandro Nicolas Lezcano (ARG), Semen Ovinov (RUS), Amit Balak (ISR)

== Final standings ==
Rank	Team
1st place, gold medalist(s)	Turkey
2nd place, silver medalist(s)	Serbia
3rd place, bronze medalist(s)	Croatia
4th	Greece
5th	Spain
6th	Italy
7th	Lithuania
8th	Latvia
9th	France
10th	Russia
11th	Montenegro
12th	Bosnia and Herzegovina
13th	Czech Republic
14th	England
15th	Belgium
16th	Poland

2014 FIBA Europe Under-18 Championship winners

Turkey
Second title

Team qualified for the 2015 FIBA Under-19 World Championship
Team relegated to the 2015 Division B

== Awards ==
Most Valuable Player
(Turkey) Egemen Güven

All-Tournament Team

- (Italy) Federico Mussini
- (Serbia) Stefan Lazarević
- (Greece) Vassilis Charalampopoulos
- (Croatia) Dragan Bender
- (Turkey) Egemen Güven
