= 1974 FIBA Europe Under-18 Championship =

International basketball competition

1974 EuroBasket Under-18
6th FIBA Europe Under-18 Championship

Tournament details
- Host country: France
- Teams: 16

Final positions
- Champions: Yugoslavia (2nd title)

The 1974 FIBA Europe Under-18 Championship was an international basketball competition held in France in 1974.

== Final standings ==
Rank	Team
Gold medal	Yugoslavia
Silver medal	Spain
Bronze medal	Italy
4th	Sweden
5th	Soviet Union
6th	Poland
7th	Greece
8th	France
9th	Czechoslovakia
10th	Belgium
11th	Israel
12th	Netherlands
13th	Turkey
14th	West Germany
15th	Finland
16th	Austria

1974 European Championship for Juniors

Yugoslavia
Second title

Team roster

Branko Skroče, Goran Križnar, Boško Bosiočić, Rajko Žižić, Dušan Župančić, Aleksandar Paternost, Mladen Mohorović, Mihovil Nakić, Andro Knego, Darko Fabulić, Zoran Gavrilović, and Ratko Radovanović. Head coach: Bogdan Tanjević.

== Awards ==
Winners
(Socialist Federal Republic of Yugoslavia) Yugoslavia
