= Poland men's national under-19 basketball team =

Poland
- FIBA zone: FIBA Europe
- National federation: Polish Basketball Federation

U19 World Cup
- Appearances: 1 (2011)
- Medals: None

U18 EuroBasket
- Appearances: 18
- Medals: None

U18 EuroBasket Division B
- Appearances: 13
- Medals: Silver: 4 (2009, 2013, 2019, 2026); Bronze: 2 (2007, 2008)

The Poland men's national under-18 and under-19 basketball team is a national basketball team of Poland, administered by the Polish Basketball Federation. It represents the country in international under-18 and under-19 men's basketball competitions.

== FIBA U18 EuroBasket participations ==
Year	Division A	Division B
1964	6th	
1968	9th	
1970	6th	
1972	10th	
1974	6th	
1976	6th	
1978	12th	
1984	11th	
1990	6th	
1992	9th	
2002	8th	
2005	15th	
2006		6th
2007		3rd place, bronze medalist(s)
2008		3rd place, bronze medalist(s)
2009		2nd place, silver medalist(s)

Year	Division A	Division B
2010	6th	
2011	6th	
2012	16th	
2013		2nd place, silver medalist(s)
2014	16th	
2015		4th
2016		6th
2017		5th
2018		12th
2019		2nd place, silver medalist(s)
2022	9th	
2023	14th	
2024		4th
2025		8th
2026		2nd place, silver medalist(s)

== FIBA Under-19 Basketball World Cup participations ==
Year	Result
2011	7th

== See also ==
- Poland men's national basketball team
- Poland men's national under-17 basketball team
- Poland women's national under-19 basketball team
