= 2006 FIBA Europe Under-18 Championship =

International basketball competition

2006 FIBA U18 European Championship
23rd FIBA Under-18 European Basketball Championship
- 2006 FIBA Europe Under-18 Championship

Tournament details
- Host country: Greece
- Teams: 16

Final positions
- Champions: France (3rd title)

Official website
- www.fibaeurope.com

The 2006 FIBA Europe Under-18 Championship was an international basketball competition held in Greece in 2006. France won the tournament championship after winning all but one of their games.

== Final ranking ==
1. France

2. Lithuania

3. Spain

4. Turkey

5. Serbia and Montenegro

6. Greece

7. Italy

8. Bulgaria

9. Russia

10. Croatia

11. Israel

12. Latvia

13. Germany

14. Slovenia

15. Iceland

16. Ukraine

== Awards ==
Winners
France
