= 2007 FIBA Europe Under-18 Championship =

International basketball competition

2007 EuroBasket Under-18
24th FIBA Europe Under-18 Championship

Tournament details
- Host country: Spain
- Teams: 16

Final positions
- Champions: Serbia (1st title)

The 2007 FIBA Europe Under-18 Championship was an international basketball competition held in Spain in 2007.

== Final ranking ==
1. Serbia

2. Greece

3. Latvia

4. Lithuania

5. Spain

6. France

7. Croatia

8. Turkey

9. Germany

10. Russia

11. Israel

12. Estonia

13. Italy

14. Bulgaria

15. Slovenia

16. Romania

== Awards ==
Winners
Serbia
