= Russia men's national under-19 basketball team =

Youth basketball team representing Russia

Russia
- FIBA zone: FIBA Europe
- National federation: Russian Basketball Federation

FIBA U19 World Cup
- Appearances: 4
- Medals: Bronze: 1 (2011)

U18 EuroBasket
- Appearances: 21
- Medals: Silver: 1 (2010)

The Russia men's national under-18 and under-19 basketball team is a national basketball team of Russia, administered by the Russian Basketball Federation. It represented the country in international men's under-16 and under-17 basketball competitions.

After the 2022 Russian invasion of Ukraine, FIBA banned Russian teams and officials from participating in FIBA basketball competitions.

== FIBA U18 EuroBasket participations ==
| Year | Result in Division A |
|---|---|
| 1994 | 8th |
| 1996 | 10th |
| 1998 | 5th |
| 2000 | 6th |
| 2002 | 10th |
| 2004 | 6th |
| 2005 | 5th |
| 2006 | 9th |
| 2007 | 10th |
| 2008 | 8th |
| 2009 | 6th |

| Year | Result in Division A |
|---|---|
| 2010 | 2nd place, silver medalist(s) |
| 2011 | 9th |
| 2012 | 4th |
| 2013 | 8th |
| 2014 | 10th |
| 2015 | 9th |
| 2016 | 7th |
| 2017 | 9th |
| 2018 | 4th |
| 2019 | 6th |

== FIBA Under-19 Basketball World Cup participations ==
| Year | Result |
|---|---|
| 1999 | 6th |
| 2011 | 3rd place, bronze medalist(s) |
| 2013 | 9th |
| 2019 | 5th |

== See also ==
- Russia men's national basketball team
- Russia men's national under-17 basketball team
- Soviet Union men's national under-19 basketball team
- Russia women's national under-19 basketball team
