= 1976 FIBA Europe Under-18 Championship =

International basketball competition

Tournament details
- Host country: Spain
- Teams: 14
- Venue(s): (in Santiago de Compostela host cities)

Final positions
- Champions: Yugoslavia (3rd title)

The 1976 FIBA Europe Under-18 Championship was an international basketball competition held in Santiago de Compostela, Spain in 1976.

== Final standings ==
Rank	Team
Gold medal	Yugoslavia
Silver medal	Soviet Union
Bronze medal	Spain
4th	Bulgaria
5th	Italy
6th	Poland
7th	Greece
8th	Israel
9th	Turkey
10th	Belgium
11th	West Germany
12th	Sweden
13th	Finland

1976 European Championship for Juniors

Yugoslavia
Third title

=== Team roster ===
Mile Stanković, Aleksandar Petrović, Pero Vučica, Predrag Bogosavljev, Damir Pavličević, Stevo Vukasović, Branko Sikirić, Željko Pribanović, Mladen Ostojić, Čedo Brborić, Miodrag Marić, and Rade Vukosavljević.

Head coach: Luka Stančić.
