= 1972 FIBA Europe Under-18 Championship =

International basketball competition

1972 EuroBasket Under-18
5th FIBA Europe Under-18 Championship

Tournament details
- Host country: Yugoslavia
- Teams: 12

Final positions
- Champions: Yugoslavia (1st title)

The 1972 FIBA Europe Under-18 Championship (known at that time as 1972 European Championship for Juniors) was an international basketball competition held in Zadar, SFR Yugoslavia in 1972.

== Final standings ==
Rank	Team
Gold medal	Yugoslavia
Silver medal	Italy
Bronze medal	Soviet Union
4th	Israel
5th	Czechoslovakia
6th	France
7th	Spain
8th	Hungary
9th	Greece
10th	Poland
11th	Turkey
12th	Bulgaria

1972 European Championship for Juniors

Yugoslavia
First title

Team Roster

Dragan Todorić, Franc Volaj, Milan Grabovac, Dragan Kićanović, Rajko Žižić, Milan Milićević, Boris Beravs, Ratko Kaljević, Mirza Delibašić, Čedomir Perinčić, Branko Macura, and Željko Jerkov. Head coach: Mirko Novosel.
