= 1996 FIBA Europe Under-18 Championship =

International basketball competition

1996 EuroBasket Under-18
17th FIBA Europe Under-18 Championship

Tournament details
- Host country: France
- Teams: 12

Final positions
- Champions: Croatia (1st title)

The 1996 FIBA Europe Under-18 Championship was an international basketball competition held in France in 1996.

== Final ranking ==
1. Croatia

2. France

3. Yugoslavia

4. Belgium

5. Turkey

6. Italy

7. Greece

8. Germany

9. Spain

10. Russia

11. Romania

12. Lithuania

== Awards ==
Winners
Croatia
