= 1968 FIBA Europe Under-18 Championship =

International basketball competition

1968 EuroBasket Under-18
3rd FIBA Europe Under-18 Championship

Tournament details
- Host country: Spain
- Teams: 12

Final positions
- Champions: Soviet Union (3rd title)

The 1968 FIBA Europe Under-18 Championship was an international basketball competition held in Vigo, Spain in 1968.

== Final ranking ==
1. Soviet Union

2. Yugoslavia

3. Italy

4. Turkey

5. Spain

6. Greece

7. Israel

8. Finland

9. Poland

10. Czechoslovakia

11. West Germany

12. Austria

== Awards ==
Winners
Soviet Union
