= Franko Šango =

Croatian basketball player

Free agent
- Position: Small forward / shooting guard

Personal information
- Born: May 22, 1992 (age 34) Zadar, Croatia
- Listed height: 2.01 m (6 ft 7 in)
- Listed weight: 87 kg (192 lb)

Career information
- Playing career: 2010–present

Career history
- 2010–2011: Pet Bunara Zadar
- 2011–2016: Zadar
- 2013–2014: →Slavonski Brod
- 2016–2017: Polisportiva Basket Lierna
- 2017–2018: Zagreb
- 2018: Jazine Arbanasi
- 2018–2019: Vrijednosnice Osijek
- 2019–2020: Jazine Arbanasi

Franko Šango (born 22 May 1992) is a Croatian professional basketball player. Standing at 2.01 m, he plays as a swingman. He last played for Jazine Arbanasi of the second-tier First League.
