= 2002 FIBA Europe Under-18 Championship =

International basketball competition

2002 EuroBasket Under-18
20th FIBA Europe Under-18 Championship

Tournament details
- Host country: Germany
- Teams: 12

Final positions
- Champions: Croatia (2nd title)

The 2002 FIBA Europe Under-18 Championship was an international basketball competition held in Germany in 2002.

== Final ranking ==
1. Croatia

2. Slovenia

3. Greece

4. Lithuania

5. Turkey

6. Israel

7. France

8. Poland

9. Spain

10. Russia

11. Latvia

12. Germany

== Awards ==
Winners
Croatia
