= France men's national under-19 basketball team =

French Under-19 Basketball Team

France
- FIBA zone: FIBA Europe
- National federation: French Federation of Basketball
- Nickname: Les Bleus (The Blues)

U19 World Cup
- Appearances: 9
- Medals: Silver: 2 (2021, 2023); Bronze: 2 (2007, 2019)

U18 EuroBasket
- Appearances: 36
- Medals: Gold: 4 (1992, 2000, 2006, 2016); Silver: 4 (1964, 1996, 2009, 2025); Bronze: 3 (2004, 2018, 2026)
First	Second

The France men's national under-18 and under-19 basketball team is the junior national basketball team representing France in international under-18 and under-19 competitions. It is administered by the French Federation of Basketball (Fédération Française de Basket-Ball).

== Tournament participations ==
=== U19 World Cup ===
Year	Result
1995	8th
2007	3rd place, bronze medalist(s)
2009	8th
2017	7th
2019	3rd place, bronze medalist(s)
2021	2nd place, silver medalist(s)
2023	2nd place, silver medalist(s)
2025	10th
2027	Qualified

=== U18 EuroBasket ===
Year	Result in Division A
1964	2nd place, silver medalist(s)
1966	7th
1972	6th
1974	8th
1978	9th
1980	12th
1982	10th
1986	10th
1990	7th
1992	1st place, gold medalist(s)
1994	5th
1996	2nd place, silver medalist(s)

Year	Result in Division A
1998	10th
2000	1st place, gold medalist(s)
2002	7th
2004	3rd place, bronze medalist(s)
2005	6th
2006	1st place, gold medalist(s)
2007	6th
2008	4th
2009	2nd place, silver medalist(s)
2010	7th
2011	7th
2012	13th

Year	Result in Division A
2013	7th
2014	9th
2015	6th
2016	1st place, gold medalist(s)
2017	6th
2018	3rd place, bronze medalist(s)
2019	5th
2022	5th
2023	4th
2024	5th
2025	2nd place, silver medalist(s)
2026	3rd place, bronze medalist(s)

== See also ==
- France men's national basketball team
- France women's national under-19 basketball team
- France men's national under-17 basketball team
- France men's national 3x3 team
