= 1986 FIBA Europe Under-18 Championship =

International basketball competition

1986 EuroBasket Under-18
12th FIBA Europe Under-18 Championship

Tournament details
- Host country: Austria
- Teams: 12

Final positions
- Champions: Yugoslavia (4th title)

The 1986 FIBA Europe Under-18 Championship was an international basketball competition held in Austria in 1986.

== Final standings ==
1. Yugoslavia

2. Soviet Union

3. Italy

4. West Germany

5. Spain

6. Greece

7. Finland

8. Czechoslovakia

9. Hungary

10. France

11. Netherlands

12. Austria

== Awards ==
1986 Basketball European U-18 champions

Yugoslavia
4th title
