= Franko Kaštropil =

Croatian basketball player

Personal information
- Born: 8 March 1984 (age 42) Split, SR Croatia, SFR Yugoslavia
- Listed height: 2.12 m (6 ft 11 in)
- Listed weight: 111 kg (245 lb)

Career information
- Playing career: 2000–present
- Position: Center

Career history
- 2000–2002: Plastik Solin
- 2002–2003: Croatia Osiguranje
- 2003–2007: Split
- 2007–2009: Cibona
- 2007: →Rudeš Zagreb
- 2009–2011: Cedevita
- 2011–2013: Zadar
- 2013–2014: Široki Primorka
- 2014: GKK Šibenik
- 2014: Tundja Yambol
- 2014–2015: Apollon Limassol
- 2015–2016: Lille Métropole
- 2015–2016: APOEL Nicosia
- 2016: SAP Vaucluse
- 2016: Zagreb
- 2017: Široki Primorka
- 2017: Cherkaski Mavpy
- 2017–2019: Jazine Arbanasi
- 2019–2020: TV Idstein
Medals
Men's basketball
Representing Croatia
European U-18 Championship
Gold medal – first place	2002 Germany	U-18 Team

Franko Kaštropil (born 8 March 1984) is a former Croatian professional basketball player.
