= 1988 FIBA Europe Under-18 Championship =

International basketball competition

1988 EuroBasket Under-18
13th FIBA Europe Under-18 Championship

Tournament details
- Host country: Yugoslavia
- Teams: 12

Final positions
- Champions: Yugoslavia (5th title)

The 1988 FIBA Europe Under-18 Championship was an international basketball competition held in Yugoslavia in 1988.

== Final standings ==
1. Yugoslavia

2. Italy

3. Czechoslovakia

4. Greece

5. Soviet Union

6. Spain

7. Turkey

8. Sweden

9. West Germany

10. Israel

11. Finland

12. Netherlands

== Awards ==
1988 Basketball European U-18 champions

Yugoslavia
5th title
