= Martin Junaković =

Croatian basketball player (born 1994)

No. 22 – Diadora Zadar
- Position: Point guard
- League: Druga liga

Personal information
- Born: 16 February 1994 (age 32) Šibenik, Croatia
- Listed height: 1.88 m (6 ft 2 in)

Career information
- Playing career: 2009–present

Career history
- 2009–2010: Šibenik
- 2010–2012: Cedevita
- 2012–2013: Šibenka
- 2013–2014: Cibona
- 2014: Jolly Šibenik
- 2015: Šibenka
- 2015–2016: Ribola Kaštela
- 2016: Hermes Analitica
- 2016–2017: Zagreb
- 2018: AV Ohrid
- 2018: Široki
- 2018: Šibenka
- 2018–2019: Nevėžis
- 2019–2022: Zadar
- 2022–2023: Boulazac Basket Dordogne
- 2023–2024: Široki
- 2024–2025: Šibenka
- 2025–2026: Giessen 46ers
- 2026–present: Diadora Zadar

Career highlights
- ABA League champion (2014); Stanković Cup (2018); Croatian League champion (2021); 2× Croatian Cup winner (2020, 2021)
Medals
Men's basketball
Representing Croatia
FIBA Europe Under-16 Championship
Gold medal – first place	2010 Montenegro	Team

Martin Junaković (born 16 February 1994) is a Croatian professional basketball player for Diadora Zadar of the Druga liga. He won the ABA League in 2014, as a member of Cibona.

== Professional career ==
He started his career in hometown club KK Šibenik in 2009, but next year he left club and signed with Cedevita Zagreb. In 2013 he returned to Šibenik for the second time. He was one of the best player in Šibenik and played starting five. In 2015 he left club and signed with KK Zagreb. He had a great start to the 2017–18 A-1 League season, averaging 29.3 points and 7.3 assists for Zagreb. He left Zagreb in the end of December 2017, and on 3 January 2018 he signed with Macedonian First League team AV Ohrid. After short time, he signed with Bosnian-Herzegovinian team HKK Široki, but in July 2018 he left club and signed with GKK Šibenik at the third time, but he left Šibenik on 21 December 2018, because of club problems with finance and went to Lithuania, signed with BC Nevėžis.

On September 8, 2025, he signed with Giessen 46ers of the ProA.

== Personal life ==
Junaković is close friends with Croatian basketball player Dario Šarić. On 29 June 2019 he married his girlfriend Matea Žižić.
