= Ivan Novačić =

Croatian basketball player (born 1985)

Dinamo Zagreb
- Position: Small forward / power forward
- League: Croatian League

Personal information
- Born: September 9, 1985 (age 41) Zadar, SR Croatia, SFR Yugoslavia
- Listed height: 6 ft 7 in (2.01 m)
- Listed weight: 196 lb (89 kg)

Career information
- NBA draft: 2007: undrafted
- Playing career: 2003–present

Career history
- 2003–2004: Dubrava
- 2005–2007: Dubrovnik
- 2007–2009: Cedevita
- 2009–2010: Zrinjevac
- 2011–2014: Zagreb
- 2014–2016: HKK Široki
- 2016: Latina Basket
- 2016–2017: Jolly JBS
- 2017–2021, 2021–2022: Cibona
- 2022–present: Dinamo Zagreb

Career highlights
- 2× Croatian League champion (2019, 2022); Croatian Cup winner (2022)
Medals
Men's basketball
Representing Croatia
European U-18 Championship
Gold medal – first place	2002 Germany	U-18 Team

Ivan Novačić (born September 3, 1985) is a Croatian professional basketball player who last played for Dinamo Zagreb of the Croatian League.

== Career ==
Novačić debuted with the Croatian basketball club Dubrava in 2003. In 2005, he moved to Croatian basketball team Dubrovnik, then to Cedevita and one season he spent in Zrinjevac. He played three seasons in the Zagreb.

On August 24, 2014, he signed for HKK Široki

On February 11, 2016, he left HKK Široki and signed with Italian Serie A2 team Latina Basket

In 2016, he signed for Jolly JBS.

On July 1, 2017, Novačić signed with Cibona. When his contract expired in the summer of 2021, he became a free agent. On December 31, 2021, Novačić was resigned at Cibona.
