= 2017 FIBA U18 European Championship =

International basketball competition

2017 EuroBasket Under-18
34th FIBA Europe Under-18 Championship

Tournament details
- Host country: Slovakia
- Dates: 29 July – 6 August 2017
- Teams: 16
- Venue(s): 2 (in 2 host cities)

Final positions
- Champions: Serbia (3rd title)

Official website
- www.fiba.basketball

The 2017 FIBA U18 European Championship was the 34th edition of the FIBA U18 European Championship. The competition took place in Bratislava and Piešťany, Slovakia, from 29 July to 6 August 2017.

== Venues ==
Bratislava	Piešťany	2017 FIBA U18 European Championship is located in Slovakia
Hant Arena	Diplomat Arena	2017 FIBA U18 European Championship is located in Slovakia
Capacity: 4.500	Capacity: 900	2017 FIBA U18 European Championship is located in Slovakia

== Participating teams ==
- Bosnia and Herzegovina
- Finland
- France
- Germany
- Greece
- Italy
- Latvia
- Lithuania
- Montenegro ▲ (Winners, 2016 FIBA U18 European Championship Division B)
- Russia
- Serbia
- Slovenia
- Slovakia ▲ (Third place, 2016 FIBA U18 European Championship Division B)
- Spain
- Turkey
- Ukraine ▲ (Runners-up, 2016 FIBA U18 European Championship Division B)

== First round ==
The first round draw was held on 26 January 2017 in Munich, Germany. In this round, the 16 teams are allocated in four groups of four teams each. All teams advance to the Second Round of 16.

=== Group A ===
Pos	Team	Pld	W	L	PF	PA	PD	Pts
1	Turkey	3	3	0	245	212	+33	6
2	Russia	3	1	2	225	230	−5	4
3	Montenegro	3	1	2	226	239	−13	4
4	Germany	3	1	2	203	218	−15	4

Source: FIBA
Rules for classification: 1) Points; 2) Head-to-head results; 3) Points difference; 4) Points scored.

29 July 2017
16:45

Boxscore

Germany	61–70	Turkey
Scoring by quarter: 19–26, 14–7, 14–13, 14–24
Pts: J. Mattisseck 11; Rebs: M. Hollersbacher 10; Asts: N. Hassfurther 3		Pts: Y. Saybir 17; Rebs: R. Atar 10; Asts: M. Akay 3

Diplomat Arena, Piešťany
Referees:
(Croatia) Srdan Dozai
(Slovakia) Marek Kukelcik
(France) Nicolas Maestre

29 July 2017
19:00

Boxscore

Russia	81–71	Montenegro
Scoring by quarter: 24–18, 21–16, 22–21, 14–16
Pts: A. Ershov 15; Rebs: D. Khaldeev 9 Asts: D. Kasatkin 3		Pts: M. Simonovic 27; Rebs: M. Simonovi 9 Asts: P. Titic 5

Diplomat Arena, Piešťany
Referees:
(Greece) Panagiotis Anastopoulos
(Albania) Gentian Cici
(Lithuania) Gintaras Vinkauskas

30 July 2017
14:30

Boxscore

Turkey	90–77	Russia
Scoring by quarter: 21–24, 23–18, 21–24, 25–11
Pts: M. Mustafa 17; Rebs: M. Mustafa 11; Asts: S. Hazer 3		Pts: A. Shashkov 13; Rebs: D. Khaldeev 9 Asts: A. Khomenko 6

Diplomat Arena, Piešťany
Referees:
(France) Mehdi Difallah
(Bosnia and Herzegovina) Haris Bijedic
(North Macedonia) Aleksandar Milojevic

30 July 2017
21:15

Boxscore

Montenegro	81–73	Germany
Scoring by quarter: 13–11, 26–22, 12–24, 30–16
Pts: P. Titic 16; Rebs: A. Slavkovic 8 Asts: P. Titic 8		Pts: B. Buck 17; Rebs: B. Buck 6 Asts: J. Mattisseck 5

Diplomat Arena, Piešťany
Referees:
(Bosnia and Herzegovina) Ademir Zurapovic
(Latvia) Martin Kozlovskis
(Slovakia) Marek Kukelcik

1 August 2017
16:45

Boxscore

Montenegro	74–85	Turkey
Scoring by quarter: 16–20, 22–28, 16–20, 20–17
Pts: N. Zizic 12; Rebs: M. Simonovic 7 Asts: P. Titic 4		Pts: R. Atar 12; Rebs: R. Atar 9 Asts: M. Akay 12

Diplomat Arena, Piešťany
Referees:
(Greece) Panagiotis Anastopoulos
(Albania) Gentian Cici
(Latvia) Martins Kozlovskis

1 August 2017
21:15

Boxscore

Germany	69–67 (OT)	Russia
Scoring by quarter: 5–13, 19–15, 23–17, 10–12, Overtime: 12–10
Pts: J. Mattisseck 15; Rebs: P. Herkenhoff 7 Asts: P. Hadenfeldt 4		Pts: A. Khomenko 15; Rebs: A. Savrasov 8 Asts: A. Khomenko 3

Diplomat Arena, Piešťany
Referees:
(France) Mehdi Difallah
(North Macedonia) Aleksandar Milojevic
(Greece) Georgios Poursanidis

=== Group B ===
Pos	Team	Pld	W	L	PF	PA	PD	Pts
1	Serbia	3	2	1	205	185	+20	5
2	Spain	3	2	1	221	210	+11	5
3	Italy	3	2	1	183	176	+7	5
4	Ukraine	3	0	3	187	225	−38	3

Source: FIBA
Rules for classification: 1) Points; 2) Head-to-head results; 3) Points difference; 4) Points scored.

29 July 2017
14:30

Boxscore

Ukraine	52–69	Italy
Scoring by quarter: 12–18, 14–17, 11–18, 15–16
Pts: A. Voinalovych 12; Rebs: I. Sanon 7 Asts: I. Sanon 2		Pts: E. Trapani 14; Rebs: G. Caruso 10; Asts: F. Zampini 4

Diplomat Arena, Piešťany
Referees:
(Bosnia and Herzegovina) Ademir Zurapovic
(Bosnia and Herzegovina) Haris Bijedic
(North Macedonia) Alexandar Milojevic

29 July 2017
21:30

Boxscore

Serbia	70–76	Spain
Scoring by quarter: 26–10, 13–23, 13–22, 18–21
Pts: Pecarski 21; Rebs: Pecarski 8 Asts: Uskoković 4		Pts: M. Gonzalez 16; Rebs: O. Ehigitor 11; Asts: M. Gonzalez 4

Diplomat Arena, Piešťany
Referees:
(France) Mehdi Difallah
(Latvia) Martin Kozlovskis
(Greece) Georgios Poursanidis

30 July 2017
16:45

Boxscore

Italy	46–63	Serbia
Scoring by quarter: 21–15, 14–11, 7–18, 4–19
Pts: M. Ebeling 15; Rebs: G. Caruso 4 Asts: F. Zampini 4		Pts: Pecarski 15; Rebs: Pecarski 7 Asts: Uskoković 5

Diplomat Arena, Piešťany
Referees:
(Croatia) Srdan Dozai
(Albania) Gentian Cici
(Lithuania) Gintaras Vitkauskas

30 July 2017
19:00

Boxscore

Spain	84–72 (OT)	Ukraine
Scoring by quarter: 24–22, 16–11, 4–14, 23–20, Overtime: 17–5
Pts: S. Martinez 20; Rebs: J. Puerto 6 Asts: P. Molins 8		Pts: I. Sanon 24; Rebs: I. Sanon 9 Asts: I. Sanon 6

Diplomat Arena, Piešťany
Referees:
(Greece) Panagiotis Anastopoulos
(France) Nicolas Maestre
(Greece) Georgios Poursanidis

1 August 2017
14:30

Boxscore

Serbia	72–63	Ukraine
Scoring by quarter: 14–16, 18–28, 20–8, 20–11
Pts: Uskoković 16; Rebs: Pecarski 14; Asts: Vulikić 4		Pts: I. Sanon 22; Rebs: V. Kozak 9 Asts: D. Klevzunyk 3

Diplomat Arena, Piešťany
Referees:
(Croatia) Srdan Dozai
(Bosnia and Herzegovina) Haris Bijedic
(Lithuania) Gintaras Viskauskas

1 August 2017
19:00

Boxscore

Italy	68–61	Spain
Scoring by quarter: 12–11, 22–14, 11–16, 23–20
Pts: M. Serpilli 15; Rebs: G. Caruso 5 Asts: F. Zampini 5		Pts: J. Parra 14; Rebs: O. Ehigitor 7 Asts: P. Molins 3

Diplomat Arena, Piešťany
Referees:
(Bosnia and Herzegovina) Ademir Zurapovic
(Slovakia) Marek Kukelcik
(France) Nicolas Maestre

=== Group C ===
Pos	Team	Pld	W	L	PF	PA	PD	Pts
1	Lithuania	3	2	1	218	200	+18	5
2	Greece	3	2	1	223	226	−3	5
3	Slovenia	3	1	2	214	236	−22	4
4	Finland	3	1	2	240	233	+7	4

Source: FIBA
Rules for classification: 1) Points; 2) Head-to-head results; 3) Points difference; 4) Points scored.

29 July 2017
14:30

Boxscore

Finland	82–62	Lithuania
Scoring by quarter: 25–20, 15–13, 19–16, 23–13
Pts: M. Jantunen 20; Rebs: M. Jantunen 14; Asts: M. Heinonen 4		Pts: L. Uleckas 14; Rebs: V. Kozys 6 Asts: A. Velicka 5

Hant Arena, Bratislava
Referees:
(Bulgaria) Martin Horozov
(Romania) Marius Cioulin
(Scotland) Chris Dodds

29 July 2017
21:30

Boxscore

Slovenia	67–81	Greece
Scoring by quarter: 12–27, 14–23, 21–19, 20–12
Pts: M. Gorbachov 13; Rebs: N. Susa 9 Asts: N. Susa 5		Pts: D. Moraitis 24; Rebs: G. Kalaitzakis 6 Asts: D. Moraitis 8

Hant Arena, Bratislava
Referees:
(Spain) Antonio Conde
(Serbia) Aleksandar Glisic
(Montenegro) Radomir Vojinovic

30 July 2017
16:45

Boxscore

Greece	81–78	Finland
Scoring by quarter: 19–15, 27–15, 12–22, 23–26
Pts: G. Kalaitzakis 23; Rebs: G. Kalaitzakis 10; Asts: G. Kalaitzakis 3		Pts: A. Gustavson 27; Rebs: M. Jantunen 9 Asts: T. Pihlajamaki 5

Hant Arena, Bratislava
Referees:
(Turkey) Yener Yilmaz
(Bulgaria) Martin Horozov
(Ukraine) Vladyslav Isachenko

30 July 2017
21:15

Boxscore

Lithuania	75–57	Slovenia
Scoring by quarter: 22–17, 8–21, 22–6, 23–13
Pts: A. Velicka 15; Rebs: T. Vaiciunas 6 Asts: A. Velicka 6		Pts: N. Klavzar 13; Rebs: M. Susec 8 Asts: N. Klavzar 2

Hant Arena, Bratislava
Referees:
(Spain) Antonio Conde
(Italy) Saverio Lanzarini
(Germany) Christof Madinger

1 August 2017
16:45

Boxscore

Finland	80–90	Slovenia
Scoring by quarter: 24–24, 17–20, 19–22, 20–24
Pts: A. Gustavson 19; Rebs: M. Jantunen 9 Asts: M. Heinonen 5		Pts: D. Kralj 32; Rebs: D. Kralj 9 Asts: D. Kralj 5

Hant Arena, Bratislava
Referees:
(Italy) Manuel Mazzoni
(Russia) Alexey Davydov
(Scotland) Chris Dodds

1 August 2017
21:15

Boxscore

Greece	61–81	Lithuania
Scoring by quarter: 25–22, 6–23, 11–19, 1917
Pts: G. Kalaitzakis 14; Rebs: C. Liounis 6 Asts: D. Moraitis 2		Pts: A. Velicka 20; Rebs: A. Velicka 9 Asts: V. Kozys 4

Hant Arena, Bratislava
Referees:
(Serbia) Aleksandar Glisic
(Romania) Marius Ciulin
(Montenegro) Radomir Vojinovic

=== Group D ===
Pos	Team	Pld	W	L	PF	PA	PD	Pts
1	France	3	2	1	226	169	+57	5
2	Bosnia and Herzegovina	3	2	1	213	212	+1	5
3	Latvia	3	2	1	206	228	−22	5
4	Slovakia	3	0	3	183	219	−36	3

Source: FIBA
Rules for classification: 1) Points; 2) Head-to-head results; 3) Points difference; 4) Points scored.

29 July 2017
16:45

Boxscore

France	65–66	Bosnia and Herzegovina
Scoring by quarter: 20–17, 13–17, 19–17, 13–15
Pts: S. Briki 13; Rebs: M. Dossou Yovo 7 Asts: L. Beyhurst 2		Pts: S. Campara 32; Rebs: E. Cerkezovic 7 Asts: S. Campara 1

Hant Arena, Bratislava
Referees:
(Italy) Manuel Mazzoni
(Ukraine) Vladyslav Isachenko
(Turkey) Yener Yilmaz

29 July 2017
19:15

Boxscore

Slovakia	61–78	Latvia
Scoring by quarter: 19–12, 7–20, 27–27, 8–19
Pts: J. Kadasi 15; Rebs: M. Zeliznak 13; Asts: D. Javorsky 4		Pts: R. Hermanovskis 18; Rebs: E. Kaufmanis 6 Asts: R. Hermanovskis 5

Hant Arena, Bratislava
Referees:
(Italy) Saverio Lanzarini
(Russia) Alexey Davydov
(Germany) Christof Madinger

30 July 2017
14:30

Boxscore

Latvia	49–93	France
Scoring by quarter: 13–24, 9–21, 9–25, 18–23
Pts: A. Miska 10; Rebs: N. Visnevics 7 Asts: N. Atelbauers 4		Pts: B. Niasse 14; Rebs: O. Sarr 6 Asts: Y. Choupas 6

Hant Arena, Bratislava
Referees:
(Romania) Marius Cioulin
(Scotland) Chris Dodds
(Italy) Manuel Mazzoni

30 July 2017
19:00

Boxscore

Bosnia and Herzegovina	73–68	Slovakia
Scoring by quarter: 18–13, 18–18, 15–15, 22–22
Pts: S. Campara 20; Rebs: A. Alikadic 10; Asts: A. Jankovic 5		Pts: D. Javorsky 23; Rebs: M. Bizub 9 Asts: M. Majercak 5

Hant Arena, Bratislava
Referees:
(Serbia) Aleksandar Glisic
(Russia) Alexey Davydov
(Montenegro) Radomir Vojinovic

1 August 2017
14:30

Boxscore

Latvia	79–74	Bosnia and Herzegovina
Scoring by quarter: 26–20, 22–28, 13–13, 18–13
Pts: F. Lacis 18; Rebs: N. Visnevics 13; Asts: D. Atelbauers 5		Pts: S. Campara 16; Rebs: S. Adzic 7 Asts: S. Campara 7

Hant Arena, Bratislava
Referees:
(Spain) Antonio Conde
(Germany) Christof Madinger
(Turkey) Yener Yilmaz

1 August 2017
19:00

Boxscore

France	68–54	Slovakia
Scoring by quarter: 15–17, 20–11, 18–15, 15–11
Pts: I. Fevrier 16; Rebs: I. Fevrier 9 Asts: S. Briki 5		Pts: M. Majercak 11; Rebs: J. Kadasi 8 Asts: M. Majercak 4

Hant Arena, Bratislava
Referees:
(Italy) Saverio Lanzarini
(Bulgaria) Martin Horozov
(Ukraine) Vladyslav Isachenko

== Final round ==
=== Round of 16 bracket ===
Round of 16
2 August
Turkey	78
Ukraine	76
2 August
Greece	71
Latvia	65
2 August
Spain	87
Montenegro	61
2 August
France	66
Finland	58
2 August
Russia	64
Italy	82
2 August
Lithuania	79
Slovakia	55
2 August
Serbia	71
Germany	64
2 August
Bosnia and Herzegovina	65
Slovenia	59

Quarterfinals
4 August
Turkey	81
Greece	63
4 August
Spain (OT)	86
France	85
4 August
Italy	60
Lithuania	72
4 August
Serbia	82
Bosnia and Herzegovina	50

Semifinals
5 August
Turkey	69
Spain	71
5 August
Lithuania	77
Serbia	83

Final
6 August
Spain	62
Serbia	74
Third place
6 August
Turkey	88
Lithuania (OT)	97

=== 5th-8th place bracket ===
5th–8th place semifinals
5 August
Greece	53
France	81
5 August
Italy	77
Bosnia and Herzegovina	59

5th place game
6 August
France	55
Italy	79
7th place game
6 August
Greece	77
Bosnia and Herzegovina	55

=== 9th–16th place bracket ===
9th–16th place quarterfinals
4 August
Ukraine	78
Latvia	60
4 August
Montenegro	67
Finland	82
4 August
Russia	76
Slovakia	55
4 August
Germany	91
Slovenia	50

9th–12th place semifinals
5 August
Ukraine	56
Finland	70
5 August
Russia (OT)	70
Germany	69

9th place game
6 August
Finland	69
Russia	75
11th place game
6 August
Ukraine	71
Germany	89

13th–16th place semifinals
5 August
Latvia	55
Montenegro	66
5 August
Slovakia	57
Slovenia	61

13th place game
6 August
Montenegro	73
Slovenia	61
15th place game
6 August
Latvia	57
Slovakia	69

=== Round of 16 ===
2 August 2017
14:30

Boxscore

Turkey	78–76	Ukraine
Scoring by quarter: 20–19, 19–24, 22–16, 17–17
Pts: R. Atar 24; Rebs: Y. Saybir 10; Asts: M. Akay 7		Pts: I. Sanon 27; Rebs: I. Sanon 5 Asts: I. Sanon 4

Hant Arena, Bratislava
Referees:
(Bosnia and Herzegovina) Ademir Zurapovic
(France) Mehdi Difallah
(North Macedonia) Aleksandar Milojevic

2 August 2017
14:30

Boxscore

Bosnia and Herzegovina	65–59	Slovenia
Scoring by quarter: 12–17, 18–11, 16–18, 19–13
Pts: S. Campara 20; Rebs: A. Jankovic 10; Asts: S. Campara 7		Pts: D. Kralj 18; Rebs: N. Klavzar 6 Asts: N. Klavzar 9

Hant Arena, Bratislava
Referees:
(Serbia) Aleksandar Glisic
(Russia) Alexey Davydov
(Turkey) Yener Yilmaz

2 August 2017
16:45

Boxscore

Spain	87–61	Montenegro
Scoring by quarter: 23–13, 29–7, 16–24, 19–17
Pts: S. Martinez 17; Rebs: S. Martinez 9 Asts: R. Carrasco 4		Pts: M. Simonovic 20; Rebs: M. Simonovic 5 Asts: A. Slavkovic 4

Hant Arena, Bratislava
Referees:
(Greece) Georgios Poursanidis
(Bosnia and Herzegovina) Haris Bijedić
(Lithuania) Gintaras Vitkauskas

2 August 2017
16:45

Boxscore

France	66–58	Finland
Scoring by quarter: 25–14, 9–19, 16–12, 16–13
Pts: I. Fevrier 17; Rebs: Y. Choupas 7 Asts: Y. Choupas 4		Pts: M. Heinonen 16; Rebs: M. Jantunen 18; Asts: M. Heinonen 4

Hant Arena, Bratislava
Referees:
(Italy) Manuel Mazzoni
(Romania) Marius Ciulin
(Germany) Christof Madinger

2 August 2017
19:00

Boxscore

Serbia	71–64	Germany
Scoring by quarter: 26–13, 11–14, 20–25, 14–12
Pts: N. Miskovic 18; Rebs: N. Miskovic 9 Asts: V. Vulikic 5		Pts: H. Drescher 14; Rebs: P. Herkenhoff 8 Asts: J. Mattisseck 4

Hant Arena, Bratislava
Referees:
(Greece) Panagiotis Anastopoulos
(Slovakia) Marek Kukelcik
(France) Nicolas Maestre

2 August 2017
19:00

Boxscore

Lithuania	79–55	Slovakia
Scoring by quarter: 19–8, 22–19, 21–16, 17–12
Pts: V. Kozys 15; Rebs: G. Vasiliauskas 8 Asts: A. Velicka 7		Pts: M. Zeliznak 16; Rebs: M. Zeliznak 9 Asts: D. Javorsky 3

Hant Arena, Bratislava
Referees:
(Spain) Antonio Conde
(Scotland) Chris Dodds
(Bulgaria) Martin Horozov

2 August 2017
21:15

Boxscore

Russia	64–82	Italy
Scoring by quarter: 11–30, 17–17, 16–18, 20–17
Pts: A. Ershov 23; Rebs: A. Savrasov 11; Asts: D. Kasatkin 4		Pts: G. Caruso 18; Rebs: M. Serpilli 7 Asts: E. Trapani 9

Hant Arena, Bratislava
Referees:
(Croatia) Srdan Dozai
(Albania) Gentian Cici
(Latvia) Martins Kozlovskis

2 August 2017
21:15

Boxscore

Greece	71–65	Latvia
Scoring by quarter: 21–17, 14–14, 14–20, 22–14
Pts: D. Moraitis 26; Rebs: G. Kalaitzakis 7 Asts: G. Kalaitzakis 6		Pts: A. Miska 12; Rebs: A. Miska 7 Asts: D. Atelbauers 4

Hant Arena, Bratislava
Referees:
(Italy) Saverio Lanzarini
(Ukraine) Vladyslav Isachenko
(Montenegro) Radomir Vojinovic

=== Quarterfinals ===
4 August 2017
14:30

Boxscore

Turkey	81–63	Greece
Scoring by quarter: 24–18, 21–15, 18–17, 18–13
Pts: R. Atar 22; Rebs: R. Atar 11; Asts: M. Akay 7		Pts: K. Kampouridis 20; Rebs: G. Kalaitzakis 7 Asts: D. Moraitis 6

Hant Arena, Bratislava
Referees:
(Croatia) Srdan Dozai
(Albania) Gentian Cici
(Latvia) Martins Kozlovskis

4 August 2017
16:45

Boxscore

Spain	86–85 (OT)	France
Scoring by quarter: 16–15, 18–30, 19–13, 22–17, Overtime: 11–10
Pts: S. Martinez 21; Rebs: O. Ehigitor 9 Asts: J. Puerto 6		Pts: Y. Blanc 21; Rebs: O. Sarr 9 Asts: S. Briki 5

Hant Arena, Bratislava
Referees:
(Italy) Saverio Lanzarini
(Serbia) Aleksandar Glisic
(Montenegro) Radomir Vojinovic

4 August 2017
19:00

Boxscore

Italy	60–72	Lithuania
Scoring by quarter: 14–23, 16–19, 18–14, 12–16
Pts: M. Ebeling 13; Rebs: A. Pajola 5 Asts: A. Pajola 10		Pts: I. Sargiunas 18; Rebs: A. Velicka 13; Asts: A. Velicka 11

Hant Arena, Bratislava
Referees:
(Greece) Panagiotis Anastopoulos
(Slovakia) Marek Kukelcik
(France) Nicolas Maestre

4 August 2017
21:15

Boxscore

Serbia	82–50	Bosnia and Herzegovina
Scoring by quarter: 19–15, 18–9, 24–13, 21–13
Pts: A. Matic 12; Rebs: M. Pecarski 10; Asts: V. Vulikic 4		Pts: S. Campara 24; Rebs: K. Kamenjas 5 Asts: A. Jankovic 3

Hant Arena, Bratislava
Referees:
(Spain) Antonio Conde
(Germany) Christof Madinger
(Greece) Georgios Poursanidis

=== Classification 9–16 quarterfinals ===
4 August 2017
14:30

Boxscore

Ukraine	78–60	Latvia
Scoring by quarter: 27–18, 26–9, 10–19, 15–14
Pts: M. Kim 23; Rebs: M. Kim 10; Asts: V. Kozak 5		Pts: E. Kaufmanis 18; Rebs: F. Lacis 7 Asts: D. Atelbauers 2

Diplomat Arena, Piešťany
Referees:
(Romania) Marius Ciulin
(Scotland) Chris Dodds
(Turkey) Yener Yilmaz

4 August 2017
16:45

Boxscore

Montenegro	67–82	Finland
Scoring by quarter: 21–17, 18–20, 20–20, 8–25
Pts: M. Simonovic 15; Rebs: M. Simonovic 10; Asts: V. Popovic 5		Pts: T. Pihlajamaki 22; Rebs: T. Pihlajamaki 9 Asts: M. Jantunen 6

Diplomat Arena, Piešťany
Referees:
(Bosnia and Herzegovina) Ademir Zurapovic
(Russia) Alexey Davydov
(Lithuania) Gintaras Vitkauskas

4 August 2017
19:00

Boxscore

Russia	76–55	Slovakia
Scoring by quarter: 20–15, 21–16, 22–13, 13–11
Pts: A. Savrasov 18; Rebs: V. Sharapov 13; Asts: A. Khomenko 3		Pts: M. Zeliznak 13; Rebs: M. Zeliznak 9 Asts: D. Javorsky 4

Diplomat Arena, Piešťany
Referees:
(Italy) Manuel Mazzoni
(Bulgaria) Martin Horozov
(Ukraine) Vladyslav Isachenko

4 August 2017
21:15

Boxscore

Germany	91–50	Slovenia
Scoring by quarter: 20–19, 25–9, 21–10, 25–12
Pts: P. Herkenhoff 14; Rebs: P. Herkenhoff 9 Asts: P. Herkenhoff 5		Pts: M. Gorbachov 9 Rebs: M. Gorbachov 6 Asts: M. Gorbachov 2

Diplomat Arena, Piešťany
Referees:
(France) Mehdi Difallah
(Bosnia and Herzegovina) Haris Bijedic
(North Macedonia) Aleksandar Milojevic

=== Classification 13–16 semifinals ===
5 August 2017
14:30

Boxscore

Latvia	55–66	Montenegro

Diplomat Arena, Piešťany
Referees:
(Italy) Manuel Mazzoni
(Russia) Alexey Davydov
(Bulgaria) Martin Horozov

5 August 2017
16:45

Boxscore

Slovakia	57–62	Slovenia

Diplomat Arena, Piešťany
Referees:
(Turkey) Yener Yilmaz
(Romania) Marius Ciulin
(Lithuania) Gintaras Vitkauskas

=== Classification 9–12 semifinals ===
5 August 2017
19:00

Boxscore

Ukraine	56–70	Finland

Diplomat Arena, Piešťany
Referees:
(France) Mehdi Difallah
(Scotland) Chris Dodds
(North Macedonia) Aleksandar Milojevic

5 August 2017
21:15

Boxscore

Russia	70–69	Germany

Diplomat Arena, Piešťany
Referees:
(Bosnia and Herzegovina) Ademir Zurapovic
(Bosnia and Herzegovina) Haris Bijedic
(Ukraine) Vladyslav Isachenko

=== Classification 5–8 semifinals ===
5 August 2017
14:30

Boxscore

Greece	53–81	France

Hant Arena, Bratislava
Referees:
(Spain) Antonio Conde
(Serbia) Aleksandar Glisic
(Montenegro) Radomir Vojinovic

5 August 2017
16:45

Boxscore

Italy	77–59	Bosnia and Herzegovina

Hant Arena, Bratislava
Referees:
(Croatia) Srdan Dozai
(Albania) Gentian Cici
(Slovakia) Marek Kukelcik

=== Semifinals ===
5 August 2017
19:00

Boxscore

Turkey	69–71	Spain

Hant Arena, Bratislava
Referees:
(Greece) Panagiotis Anastopoulos
(Latvia) Martins Kozlovskis
(France) Nicolas Maestre

5 August 2017
21:15

Boxscore

Lithuania	77–83	Serbia

Hant Arena, Bratislava
Referees:
(Italy) Saverio Lanzarini
(Germany) Christof Madinger
(Greece) Georgios Poursanidis

=== 15th place game ===
6 August 2017
14:30

Boxscore

Latvia	57–69	Slovakia

Diplomat Arena, Piešťany
Referees:
(France) Mehdi Difallah
(North Macedonia) Aleksandar Milojevic
(Bosnia and Herzegovina) Ademir Zurapovic

=== 13th place game ===
6 August 2017
16:45

Boxscore

Montenegro	73–61	Slovenia

Diplomat Arena, Piešťany
Referees:
(Romania) Marius Ciulin
(Scotland) Chris Dodds
(Bulgaria) Martin Horozov

=== 11th place game ===
6 August 2017
19:00

Boxscore

Ukraine	71–89	Germany

Diplomat Arena, Piešťany
Referees:
(France) Mehdi Difallah
(Bosnia and Herzegovina) Haris Bijedic
(Lithuania) Gintaras Vitkauskas

=== 9th place game ===
6 August 2017
21:15

Boxscore

Finland	69–75	Russia

Diplomat Arena, Piešťany
Referees:
(Turkey) Yener Yilmaz
(Bulgaria) Martin Horozov
(Ukraine) Vladyslav Isachenko

=== 7th place game ===
6 August 2017
14:30

Boxscore

Greece	77–55	Bosnia and Herzegovina

Hant Arena, Bratislava
Referees:
(Germany) Christof Madinger
(Albania) Gentian Cici
(Slovakia) Marek Kukelcik

=== 5th place game ===
6 August 2017
16:45

Boxscore

France	55–79	Italy

Hant Arena, Bratislava
Referees:
(Greece) Georgios Poursanidis
(Serbia) Aleksandar Glisic
(Montenegro) Radomir Vojinovic

=== Third place game ===
6 August 2017
19:00

Boxscore

Turkey	88–97	Lithuania

Hant Arena, Bratislava
Referees:
(Spain) Antonio Conde
(Croatia) Srdan Dozai
(Italy) Saverio Lanzarini

=== Final ===
6 August 2017
21:15

Boxscore

Spain	62–74	Serbia

Hant Arena, Bratislava
Attendance: 1000
Referees:
(Greece) Panagiotis Anastopoulos
(France) Nicolas Maestre
(Latvia) Mārtiņš Kozlovskis

== Final standings ==
Rank	Team	Record
1st place, gold medalist(s)	Serbia	6–1
2nd place, silver medalist(s)	Spain	5–2
3rd place, bronze medalist(s)	Lithuania	5–2
4th	Turkey	5–2
5th	Italy	5–2
6th	France	4–3
7th	Greece	4–3
8th	Bosnia and Herzegovina	3–4
9th	Russia	4–3
10th	Finland	3–4
11th	Germany	3–4
12th	Ukraine	1–6
13th	Montenegro	3–4
14th	Slovenia	2–5
15th	Slovakia	1–6
16th	Latvia	2–5

Relegated to the 2018 FIBA U18 European Championship Division B

== Awards ==
2017 FIBA Europe
Under-18 Championship winner

Serbia
Third title

Most Valuable Player
(Serbia) Nikola Mišković

All-Tournament Team

- PG – (Bosnia and Herzegovina) Sani Čampara
- SG – (Lithuania) Arnas Velička
- SF – (Serbia) Nikola Mišković (MVP)
- PF – (Spain) Sergi Martínez
- C – (Turkey) Ragip Berke
