= Aleksandar Ugrinoski =

Macedonian-Croatian basketball player

Personal information
- Born: May 7, 1988 (age 38) Skopje, SR Macedonia, SFR Yugoslavia
- Listed height: 1.92 m (6 ft 4 in)

Career information
- NBA draft: 2010: undrafted
- Playing career: 2002–2013
- Position: Point guard

Career history
- 2002–2004: Cibona
- 2004–2005: →Dubrava
- 2005–2006: Cibona
- 2006–2007: Traiskirchen Lions
- 2007–2008: Utah Flash
- 2009: Rabotnički
- 2009–2010: Rilski Sportist
- 2010: Vardar
- 2010: Rimini Crabs
- 2011–2012: Las Rozas
- 2012–2013: Lirija
- 2013: Karpoš Sokoli

Career highlights
- 2× Croatian League champion (2004, 2006); Macedonian League champion (2009)

Aleksandar Ugrinoski (Macedonian: Александар Угриноски; born May 7, 1988) is a Macedonian-Croatian former professional basketball player.

== Professional career ==
Ugrinoski started out his career by coming off the bench for the Cibona VIP at age 14, later becoming the youngest player to start in Euroleague history, starting at the age of 15 years, 266 days old. Only two other players in Can Maxim Mutaf and Manuchar Markoishvili would start in the Euroleague at the age of 15. However, he finished his career playing with Karpoš Sokoli of the Macedonian First League at the young age of 25.

== Croatian national team ==
Ugrinoski was also member of U-18 Croatian national basketball team.

== See also ==
- List of youngest EuroLeague players
