= Spain men's national under-18 basketball team =

Spain
- FIBA zone: FIBA Europe
- National federation: Spanish Basketball Federation
- Coach: Daniel Miret

U18 EuroBasket
- Appearances: 41
- Medals: Gold: 6 (1998, 2004, 2011, 2019, 2022, 2025); Silver: 4 (1974, 1978, 2017, 2023); Bronze: 5 (1976, 1990, 1994, 2006, 2013)
Home	Away

The Spain men's national under-18 basketball team (Spain Youth national basketball team), is the representative for Spain in international under-18 men's basketball competitions, and it is organized and run by the Spanish Basketball Federation.

The team represents Spain at the FIBA U18 EuroBasket and it's the only team that has appeared at every Division A tournament since it was first held in 1964.

== FIBA U18 EuroBasket participations ==
Year	Position
(Italy) 1964	8th
(Italy) 1966	6th
(Spain) 1968	5th
(Greece) 1970	5th
(Socialist Federal Republic of Yugoslavia) 1972	7th
(France) 1974	2nd place, silver medalist(s)
(Spain) 1976	3rd place, bronze medalist(s)
(Italy) 1978	2nd place, silver medalist(s)
(Socialist Federal Republic of Yugoslavia) 1980	4th
(Bulgaria) 1982	6th
(Sweden) 1984	4th
(Austria) 1986	5th
(Socialist Federal Republic of Yugoslavia) 1988	6th
(Netherlands) 1990	3rd place, bronze medalist(s)

Year	Position
(Hungary) 1992	6th
(Israel) 1994	3rd place, bronze medalist(s)
(France) 1996	9th
(Bulgaria) 1998	1st place, gold medalist(s)
(Croatia) 2000	11th
(Germany) 2002	9th
(Spain) 2004	1st place, gold medalist(s)
(Serbia) 2005	4th
(Greece) 2006	3rd place, bronze medalist(s)
(Spain) 2007	5th
(Greece) 2008	5th
(France) 2009	5th
(Lithuania) 2010	11th
(Poland) 2011	1st place, gold medalist(s)

Year	Position
(Lithuania) 2012	5th
(Latvia) 2013	3rd place, bronze medalist(s)
(Turkey) 2014	5th
(Greece) 2015	7th
(Turkey) 2016	5th
(Slovakia) 2017	2nd place, silver medalist(s)
(Latvia) 2018	9th
(Greece) 2019	1st place, gold medalist(s)
(Turkey) 2022	1st place, gold medalist(s)
(Serbia) 2023	2nd place, silver medalist(s)
(Finland) 2024	13th
(Serbia) 2025	1st place, gold medalist(s)
(Italy) 2026	4th
Total	41/41

== See also ==
- Spanish Basketball Federation
- Spain national youth basketball teams
- Spain women's national under-18 basketball team
