= 1994 FIBA Europe Under-18 Championship =

International basketball competition

1994 EuroBasket Under-18
16th FIBA Europe Under-18 Championship

Tournament details
- Host country: Israel
- Teams: 12

Final positions
- Champions: Lithuania (1st title)

The 1994 FIBA Europe Under-18 Championship was an international basketball competition held in Israel in 1994.

== Final ranking ==
1. Lithuania

2. Croatia

3. Spain

4. Italy

5. France

6. Greece

7. Slovenia

8. Russia

9. Turkey

10. Israel

11. Ukraine

12. Germany

== Awards ==
Winners
Lithuania
