= 1966 FIBA Europe Under-18 Championship =

International basketball competition

1966 EuroBasket Under-18
2nd FIBA Europe Under-18 Championship

Tournament details
- Host country: Italy
- Teams: 8

Final positions
- Champions: Soviet Union (2nd title)

The 1966 FIBA Europe Under-18 Championship was an international basketball competition held in Porto San Giorgio, Italy in 1966.

== Final ranking ==
1. Soviet Union

2. Yugoslavia

3. Italy

4. Czechoslovakia

5. Bulgaria

6. Spain

7. France

8. Finland

== Awards ==
Winners
Soviet Union
