= 1990 FIBA Europe Under-18 Championship =

International basketball competition

1990 EuroBasket Under-18
14th FIBA Europe Under-18 Championship

Tournament details
- Host country: Netherlands
- Teams: 12

Final positions
- Champions: Italy (1st title)

The 1990 FIBA Europe Under-18 Championship was an international basketball competition held in the Netherlands in 1990.

== Final ranking ==
1. Italy

2. Soviet Union

3. Spain

4. Romania

5. Yugoslavia

6. Poland

7. France

8. Greece

9. Turkey

10. Netherlands

11. Czechoslovakia

12. West Germany

== Awards ==
Winners
Italy
