= 1992 FIBA Europe Under-18 Championship =

International basketball competition

1992 EuroBasket Under-18
15th FIBA Europe Under-18 Championship

Tournament details
- Host country: Hungary
- Teams: 11

Final positions
- Champions: France (1st title)

The 1992 FIBA Europe Under-18 Championship was an international basketball competition held in Hungary in 1992.

== Final ranking ==
1. France

2. Italy

3. CIS

4. Greece

5. Israel

6. Spain

7. Germany

8. Finland

9. Poland

10. Belgium

11. Hungary

== Awards ==
Winners
France
