= 1964 FIBA Europe Under-18 Championship =

International basketball competition

1964 EuroBasket Under-18
1st FIBA Europe Under-18 Championship

Tournament details
- Host country: Italy
- Teams: 8

Final positions
- Champions: Soviet Union (1st title)

The 1964 FIBA Europe Under-18 Championship was an international basketball competition held in Italy in 1964.

== Final ranking ==
1. Soviet Union

2. France

3. Italy

4. Bulgaria

5. Czechoslovakia

6. Poland

7. Yugoslavia

8. Spain

== Awards ==
Winners
Soviet Union
