= 2016 FIBA U18 European Championship Division B =

Tournament details
- Host country: Macedonia
- City: Skopje
- Dates: 29 July – 7 August 2016
- Teams: 24 (from 1 confederation)
- Venues: 3 (in 1 host city)

Final positions
- Champions: Montenegro (2nd title)
- Runners-up: Ukraine
- Third place: Slovakia

Official website
- www.fiba.basketball

The 2016 FIBA U18 European Championship Division B was the 12th edition of the Division B of FIBA U18 European Championship. The competition took place in Skopje, Republic of Macedonia, from 29 July to 7 August 2016.

== Participating teams ==
- Albania
- Austria
- Belarus
- Belgium
- Bulgaria
- Cyprus
- Czech Republic ▼ (16th place, 2015 FIBA Europe Under-18 Championship Division A)
- Denmark
- England
- Estonia
- Georgia
- Hungary
- Iceland
- Ireland
- Luxembourg
- Macedonia
- Montenegro ▼ (14th place, 2015 FIBA Europe Under-18 Championship Division A)
- Netherlands
- Poland
- Portugal
- Romania
- Scotland
- Slovakia
- Ukraine ▼ (15th place, 2015 FIBA Europe Under-18 Championship Division A)

== First round ==
In this round, the 24 teams are allocated in four groups of six teams each. The best two teams of each group will advance to the Quarterfinals.

=== Group A ===
Pos	Team	Pld	W	L	PF	PA	PD	Pts	Team advances to
1	Hungary	5	5	0	407	294	+113	10	Quarterfinals
2	Poland	5	4	1	408	332	+76	9	Quarterfinals
3	Bulgaria	5	3	2	422	348	+74	8	9th – 16th place playoffs
4	Macedonia	5	2	3	369	406	−37	7	9th – 16th place playoffs
5	Cyprus	5	1	4	271	383	−112	6	17th – 24th place playoffs
6	Ireland	5	0	5	344	458	−114	5	17th – 24th place playoffs

Source: FIBA
Rules for classification: 1) Points; 2) Head-to-head results; 3) Points difference; 4) Points scored.

29 July 2016
16:30

Boxscore

Poland	72–76	Hungary
Scoring by quarter: 19–18, 24–14, 17–20, 12–24
Pts: Wilczek 18; Rebs: Kurpisz 8 Asts: Kobel 6		Pts: Lewis 19; Rebs: Durazi 11; Asts: Lewis 4

Sports Centre Boris Trajkovski, Skopje
Referees: Milija Vojinović (SRB), Milan Brziak (SVK), Martins Kozlovskis (LAT)

29 July 2016
18:45

Boxscore

Macedonia	69–88	Bulgaria
Scoring by quarter: 16–29, 20–25, 17–10, 16–24
Pts: Mamuzikj 22; Rebs: Dimitrijević 6 Asts: Dimitrijević 6		Pts: Minchev 26; Rebs: Minchev 9 Asts: L. Dimitrov 8

Sports Centre Boris Trajkovski, Skopje
Referees: Sergio Silva (POR), Mykola Ambrosov (UKR), Sergei Beliakov (RUS)

29 July 2016
21:00

Boxscore

Cyprus	67–61	Ireland
Scoring by quarter: 25–18, 15–14, 18–15, 9–14
Pts: Mythillou 13; Rebs: Karampatakis 9 Asts: Andreou 5		Pts: Sullivan 15; Rebs: Drummond 10; Asts: Guebaili 4

Sports Centre Boris Trajkovski, Skopje
Referees: Alexey Davydov (RUS), Leifur Garðarsson (ISL), Rune Ressel Larsen (DEN)

30 July 2016
14:15

Boxscore

Bulgaria	69–74	Poland
Scoring by quarter: 18–13, 22–21, 18–18, 11–22
Pts: Minchev 19; Rebs: Minchev 10; Asts: L. Dimitrov 5		Pts: Gołębiowski 13; Rebs: Wysocki 8 Asts: Rutkowski 2

Sports Centre Jane Sandanski, Skopje
Referees: Ademir Zurapović (BIH), Vincent Delestree (BEL), Marko Vladić (AUT)

30 July 2016
16:30

Boxscore

Hungary	88–41	Cyprus
Scoring by quarter: 21–11, 25–8, 23–5, 19–17
Pts: Durazi 15; Rebs: Durazi 6 Asts: Krnjajski 6		Pts: Stavrinides 8 Rebs: Stavrinides 4 Asts: Andreou 1

Sports Centre Jane Sandanski, Skopje
Referees: Aare Halliko (EST), Milosav Kaluđerović (MNE), Preeda Muongmee (THA)

30 July 2016
18:45

Boxscore

Ireland	82–96	Macedonia
Scoring by quarter: 31–28, 20–18, 18–34, 13–16
Pts: Drummond 17; Rebs: Drummond 8 Asts: Rockall 4		Pts: Efremovski 24; Rebs: Mamuzikj 10; Asts: Dimitrijević 12

Sports Centre Boris Trajkovski, Skopje
Referees: Konstantin Simonow (GER), Milan Brziak (SVK), Mircea Constantin Serban (ROU)

31 July 2016
12:00

Boxscore

Cyprus	42–70	Poland
Scoring by quarter: 12–13, 8–18, 5–16, 17–23
Pts: Andreou 8 Rebs: Andreou 6 Asts: Stavrinides 2		Pts: Kurpisz 16; Rebs: Kurpisz 8 Asts: Kolenda 5

Sports Centre Jane Sandanski, Skopje
Referees: Sergio Silva (POR), Marc Mouton (LUX), Mircea Constantin Serban (ROU)

31 July 2016
14:15

Boxscore

Ireland	67–113	Bulgaria
Scoring by quarter: 9–24, 11–32, 24–26, 23–31
Pts: Drummond 15; Rebs: Drummond 6 Asts: Rockall 4		Pts: Minchev 30; Rebs: Minchev 8 Asts: Minchev 4

Sports Centre Jane Sandanski, Skopje
Referees: Aare Halliko (EST), David Berishvili (GEO), Ivor Matejek (CZE)

31 July 2016
18:45

Boxscore

Macedonia	56–78	Hungary
Scoring by quarter: 16–12, 11–25, 15–24, 14–17
Pts: Hot 16; Rebs: Hot 11; Asts: Dimitrijević 10		Pts: Kucsora 20; Rebs: Bordacs 9 Asts: Krnjajski 5

Sports Centre Boris Trajkovski, Skopje
Referees: Francisco Arana (SPA), Leifur Garðarsson (ISL), Vilius Maciulaitis (LTU)

2 August 2016
12:00

Boxscore

Hungary	94–55	Ireland
Scoring by quarter: 22–8, 21–10, 24–15, 27–22
Pts: Kucsora 16; Rebs: Durazi 10; Asts: Krnjajski 5		Pts: Treacy 14; Rebs: Treacy 7 Asts: Guebaili 2

Sports Centre Jane Sandanski, Skopje
Referees: Sergio Silva (POR), Vincent Delestree (BEL), Martins Kozlovskis (LAT)

2 August 2016
18:45

Boxscore

Poland	104–66	Macedonia
Scoring by quarter: 21–10, 25–20, 31–24, 27–12
Pts: Szczypiński 16; Rebs: Pietras 8 Asts: Kobel 8		Pts: Dimitrijević 22; Rebs: Mamuzikj 7 Asts: Dimitrijević 6

Sports Centre Boris Trajkovski, Skopje
Referees: Chris Dodds (SCO), Andrei Sharapa (BLR), Paul Unsworth (ENG)

2 August 2016
21:00

Boxscore

Bulgaria	82–67	Cyprus
Scoring by quarter: 19–14, 28–17, 12–13, 23–23
Pts: Kotsev 23; Rebs: Kotsev 9 Asts: L. Dimitrov 4		Pts: Andreou 12; Rebs: Stavrinides 8 Asts: Andreou 2

Sports Centre Jane Sandanski, Skopje
Referees: Rune Ressel Larssen (DEN), Milan Adamović (BIH), Anastasios Manos (GRE)

3 August 2016
16:30

Boxscore

Hungary	71–70	Bulgaria
Scoring by quarter: 18–18, 24–21, 13–16, 16–15
Pts: Durazi 16; Rebs: Volgyi 8 Asts: Krnjajski 4		Pts: Minchev 19; Rebs: Minchev 8 Asts: Kotsev 3

Sports Centre Jane Sandanski, Skopje
Referees: Gergios Poursanidis (GRE), Alexey Davydov (RUS), Andrei Sharapa (BLR)

3 August 2016
18:45

Boxscore

Macedonia	82–54	Cyprus
Scoring by quarter: 20–13, 17–9, 16–11, 29–21
Pts: Dimitrijević 23; Rebs: Dimitrijević 10; Asts: Dimitrijević 10		Pts: Hadjicostas 12; Rebs: Hadjicostas 7 Asts: Hadjicostas 2

Sports Centre Boris Trajkovski, Skopje
Referees: Francisco Arana (SPA), Martins Kozlovskis (LAT), Bernard Vassallo (MLT)

3 August 2016
21:00

Boxscore

Ireland	79–88	Poland
Scoring by quarter: 21–23, 21–19, 16–17, 21–29
Pts: Drummond 27; Rebs: Guebaili 8 Asts: Guebaili 3		Pts: Wilczek 20; Rebs: Rutkowski 11; Asts: Gołębiowski 4

Sports Centre Jane Sandanski, Skopje
Referees: Tomislav Hordov (CRO), Milan Adamović (BIH), Marc Mouton (LUX)

=== Group B ===
Pos	Team	Pld	W	L	PF	PA	PD	Pts	Team advances to
1	Montenegro	5	5	0	434	269	+165	10	Quarterfinals
2	Belgium	5	3	2	362	274	+88	8	Quarterfinals
3	Belarus	5	3	2	339	360	−21	8	9th – 16th place playoffs
4	Portugal	5	2	3	290	318	−28	7	9th – 16th place playoffs
5	Romania	5	1	4	302	391	−89	6	17th – 24th place playoffs
6	Austria	5	1	4	298	413	−115	6	17th – 24th place playoffs

Source: FIBA
Rules for classification: 1) Points; 2) Head-to-head results; 3) Points difference; 4) Points scored.

29 July 2016
12:00

Boxscore

Austria	67–79	Romania
Scoring by quarter: 28–19, 11–28, 13–15, 15–17
Pts: John 18; Rebs: McCaw 5 Asts: McCaw 4		Pts: Tohatan 16; Rebs: Berceanu 4 Asts: Diculescu 3

Sports Centre Jane Sandanski, Skopje
Referees: Georgios Poursanidis (GRE), David Berishvili (GEO), Ivor Matejek (CZE)

29 July 2016
14:15

Boxscore

Montenegro	71–59	Belgium
Scoring by quarter: 17–15, 20–14, 15–13, 19–17
Pts: Popovic 27; Rebs: Popovic 13; Asts: Dubak 3		Pts: Neri 12; Rebs: D'Espallier 5 Asts: El Mahsini 4

Sports Centre Jane Sandanski, Skopje
Referees: Milivoje Jovčić (SRB), Aare Halliko (EST), Dariusz Zapolski (POL)

29 July 2016
16:30

Boxscore

Belarus	66–54	Portugal
Scoring by quarter: 15–13, 12–14, 19–13, 20–14
Pts: Massalski 16; Rebs: Vikentsyeu 17; Asts: Mikulski 7		Pts: Costa 10; Rebs: Delgado 13; Asts: Lima 2

Sports Centre Jane Sandanski, Skopje
Referees: Anastasios Manos (GRE), Milan Adamović (BIH), Ventsislav Velikov (BUL)

30 July 2016
12:00

Boxscore

Belgium	75–57	Belarus
Scoring by quarter: 21–8, 25–16, 16–14, 13–19
Pts: Snyers 18; Rebs: Neri 10; Asts: Neri 7		Pts: Karattsou 14; Rebs: Karattsou 10; Asts: Massalski 4

Sports Centre Boris Trajkovski, Skopje
Referees: Milija Vojinović (SRB), Ilias Kounelles (CYP), Vilius Maciulaitis (LTU)

30 July 2016
14:15

Boxscore

Portugal	73–74 (OT)	Austria
Scoring by quarter: 24–23, 15–12, 12–17, 14–13, Overtime: 8–9
Pts: Lanca 21; Rebs: Delgado 8 Asts: Costa 1		Pts: Hofbauer 22; Rebs: Brajković 12; Asts: Ernst 5

Sports Centre Boris Trajkovski, Skopje
Referees: Milivoje Jovčić (SRB), Mykola Ambrosov (UKR), Sergei Beliakov (RUS)

30 July 2016
21:00

Boxscore

Romania	64–101	Montenegro
Scoring by quarter: 15–18, 19–21, 13–34, 17–28
Pts: Darwiche 13; Rebs: Calenic 8 Asts: Diculescu 2		Pts: Popović 22; Rebs: Popović 7 Asts: Čarapić 9

Sports & Recreation Centre Kale, Skopje
Referees: Francisco Arana (ESP), Chris Dodds (SCO), Paul Unsworth (ENG)

31 July 2016
14:15

Boxscore

Austria	45–91	Belgium
Scoring by quarter: 6–17, 12–28, 15–22, 12–24
Pts: Hofbauer 9 Rebs: Gentner 7 Asts: Ernst 2		Pts: Kuijt 15; Rebs: Vanderhaege 9 Asts: Mortant 4

Sports Centre Boris Trajkovski, Skopje
Referees: Tomislav Hordov (CRO), Milan Brziak (SVK), Alexey Davydov (RUS)

31 July 2016
16:30

Boxscore

Portugal	62–45	Romania
Scoring by quarter: 13–11, 12–14, 17–12, 20–8
Pts: Costa 14; Rebs: Delgado 12; Asts: Carvalho 2		Pts: Tohatan 14; Rebs: Georgiadis 12; Asts: Diculescu 1

Sports Centre Boris Trajkovski, Skopje
Referees: Branislav Mrdak (SVK), Ilias Kounelles (CYP), Aleksander Pavlov (MKD)

31 July 2016
21:00

Boxscore

Belarus	56–95	Montenegro
Scoring by quarter: 15–25, 10–22, 21–27, 10–21
Pts: Vikentsyeu 8 Rebs: Pahrabitski 6 Asts: Karattsou 3		Pts: Čarapić 17; Rebs: Čarapić 8 Asts: Čarapić 7

Sports Centre Boris Trajkovski, Skopje
Referees: Georgios Poursanidis (GRE), Konstantin Simonow (GER), Bernard Vassallo (MLT)

2 August 2016
14:15

Boxscore

Montenegro	87–45	Austria
Scoring by quarter: 22–15, 26–7, 27–12, 12–11
Pts: Čarapić 21; Rebs: Simonović 9 Asts: Čarapić 5		Pts: Ernst 13; Rebs: Brajković 12; Asts: Ernst 3

Sports Centre Boris Trajkovski, Skopje
Referees: Francisco Arana (SPA), Mykola Ambrosov (UKR), Leifur Gardarsson (ISL)

2 August 2016
16:30

Boxscore

Romania	69–77	Belarus
Scoring by quarter: 10–17, 18–17, 17–21, 24–22
Pts: Tohatan 16; Rebs: Berceanu 8 Asts: Berceanu 3		Pts: Mikulski 34; Rebs: Massalski 18; Asts: Massalski 5

Sports Centre Jane Sandanski, Skopje
Referees: Milivoje Jovčić (SRB), Preeda Muongmee (THA), Ventsislav Velikov (BUL)

2 August 2016
17:30

Boxscore

Belgium	53–56	Portugal
Scoring by quarter: 15–15, 11–15, 10–11, 17–15
Pts: Snyers 13; Rebs: Bronchart 7 Asts: Neri 2		Pts: Delgado 21; Rebs: Delgado 11; Asts: Delgado 3

Sports & Recreation Centre Kale, Skopje
Referees: Georgios Poursanidis (GRE), David Berishvili (GEO), Ademir Zurapović (BIH)

3 August 2016
12:00

Boxscore

Portugal	45–80	Montenegro
Scoring by quarter: 7–24, 16–17, 9–20, 13–19
Pts: Lima 10; Rebs: Delgado 7 Asts: Teixeira 1		Pts: Čarapić 18; Rebs: Popović 13; Asts: Čarapić 4

Sports Centre Jane Sandanski, Skopje
Referees: Vilius Maciulaitis (LTU), Ivor Matejek (CZE), Preeda Muongmee (THA)

3 August 2016
14:15

Boxscore

Belgium	84–45	Romania
Scoring by quarter: 8–15, 23–11, 29–11, 24–8
Pts: Vanderhaege 14; Rebs: Bronchart 10; Asts: El Mahsini 5		Pts: Georgiadis 10; Rebs: Birloveanu 6 Asts: Diculescu 3

Sports Centre Jane Sandanski, Skopje
Referees: Aare Halliko (EST), Mykola Ambrosov (UKR), Konstantin Simonow (GER)

3 August 2016
21:00

Boxscore

Austria	67–83	Belarus
Scoring by quarter: 18–21, 14–22, 16–25, 19–15
Pts: McCaw 21; Rebs: Brajković 13; Asts: John 4		Pts: Vikentsyeu 23; Rebs: Massalski 9 Asts: Mikulski 5

Sports & Recreation Centre Kale, Skopje
Referees: Milija Vojinović (SRB), Paul Unsworth (ENG), Dariusz Zapolski (POL)

=== Group C ===
Pos	Team	Pld	W	L	PF	PA	PD	Pts	Team advances to
1	Estonia	5	4	1	362	309	+53	9	Quarterfinals
2	Czech Republic	5	4	1	341	272	+69	9	Quarterfinals
3	Iceland	5	3	2	372	331	+41	8	9th – 16th place playoffs
4	Denmark	5	3	2	330	308	+22	8	9th – 16th place playoffs
5	Netherlands	5	1	4	326	357	−31	6	17th – 24th place playoffs
6	Luxembourg	5	0	5	255	409	−154	5	17th – 24th place playoffs

Source: FIBA
Rules for classification: 1) Points; 2) Head-to-head results; 3) Points difference; 4) Points scored.

29 July 2016
12:00

Boxscore

Netherlands	65–71	Estonia
Scoring by quarter: 11–15, 11–18, 19–17, 24–21
Pts: Ramović 20; Rebs: Hoogsteden 10; Asts: Ververs 4		Pts: Kullamäe 20; Rebs: Kullamäe 9 Asts: Kullamäe 6

Sports Centre Boris Trajkovski, Skopje
Referees: Francisco Araña (ESP), Chris Dodds (SCO), Milosav Kaluđerović (MNE)

29 July 2016
14:15

Boxscore

Denmark	53–66	Czech Republic
Scoring by quarter: 6–10, 7–30, 24–14, 16–12
Pts: Jevrić 16; Rebs: Jevrić 8 Asts: Berg 5		Pts: Váňa 16; Rebs: Kozák 17; Asts: Kolář 2

Sports Centre Boris Trajkovski, Skopje
Referees: Konstantin Simonow (GER), Mircea Constantin Serban (ROU), Paul Unsworth (ENG)

29 July 2016
17:30

Boxscore

Iceland	97–50	Luxembourg
Scoring by quarter: 29–18, 23–16, 26–8, 19–8
Pts: Halldórsson 15; Rebs: Halldórsson 14; Asts: Hermannsson 5		Pts: P. Arendt 11; Rebs: P. Arendt 4 Asts: P. Arendt 4

Sports & Recreation Centre Kale, Skopje
Referees: Branislav Mrdak (SRB), Vilius Maciulaitis (LTU), Marko Vladić (AUT)

30 July 2016
12:00

Boxscore

Czech Republic	61–59 (OT)	Iceland
Scoring by quarter: 14–6, 15–11, 7–14, 18–23, Overtime: 7–5
Pts: Tuma 18; Rebs: Tuma 15; Asts: Tuma 3		Pts: Guðmundsson 16; Rebs: Halldórsson 7 Asts: Guðmundsson 4

Sports Centre Jane Sandanski, Skopje
Referees: Sergio Silva (POR), David Berishvili (GEO), Aleksander Pavlov (MKD)

30 July 2016
17:30

Boxscore

Estonia	64–70	Denmark
Scoring by quarter: 12–17, 12–21, 18–20, 22–12
Pts: Tass 13; Rebs: Tass 6 Asts: Saaremäel 4		Pts: Berg 13; Rebs: Bank 11; Asts: Nerlov 7

Sports & Recreation Centre Kale, Skopje
Referees: Tomislav Hordov (CRO), Anastasios Manos (GRE), Ventsislas Velikov (BUL)

30 July 2016
21:00

Boxscore

Luxembourg	67–80	Netherlands
Scoring by quarter: 13–27, 19–23, 16–18, 19–12
Pts: Germeaux 19; Rebs: Cames 5 Asts: P. Arendt 3		Pts: Wirjo 15; Rebs: Banda 7 Asts: Ramović 7

Sports Centre Jane Sandanski, Skopje
Referees: Alexey Davydov (RUS), Andrei Sharapa (BLR), Dariusz Zapolski (POL)

31 July 2016
12:00

Boxscore

Iceland	73–68	Denmark
Scoring by quarter: 23–21, 18–15, 17–23, 15–9
Pts: Halldórsson 17; Rebs: Jóhannesson 8 Asts: Sverrisson 4		Pts: Kristensen 14; Rebs: Berg 13; Asts: Berg 4

Sports Centre Boris Trajkovski, Skopje
Referees: Chris Dodds (SCO), Martins Kozlovskis (LAT), Andrei Sharapa (BLR)

31 July 2016
16:30

Boxscore

Luxembourg	53–76	Estonia
Scoring by quarter: 17–19, 13–30, 17–13, 6–14
Pts: Anđelković 26; Rebs: Germeaux 8 Asts: P. Arendt 4		Pts: Kullamäe 32; Rebs: Tass 10; Asts: Kaldre 4

Sports Centre Jane Sandanski, Skopje
Referees: Sergei Beliakov (RUS), Preeda Muongmee (THA), Paul Unsworth (ENG)

31 July 2016
17:30

Boxscore

Netherlands	62–83	Czech Republic
Scoring by quarter: 17–18, 14–19, 10–14, 21–32
Pts: Wirjo 14; Rebs: van der Vuurst de Vries 10; Asts: van der Vuurst de Vries 4		Pts: Zidek 13; Rebs: Kozák 7 Asts: Kotásek 4

Sports & Recreation Centre Kale, Skopje
Referees: Milan Adamović (BIH), Mykola Ambrosov (UKR), Vincent Delestree (BEL)

2 August 2016
12:00

Boxscore

Czech Republic	73–33	Luxembourg
Scoring by quarter: 24–7, 20–12, 9–12, 20–2
Pts: Kolář 11; Rebs: Kolář 8 Asts: Kotasek 2		Pts: Anđelković 11; Rebs: Schneider 6 Asts: P. Arendt 5

Sports Centre Boris Trajkovski, Skopje
Referees: Bernard Vassallo (MLT), Milosav Kaluđerović (MNE), Ilias Kounelles (CYP)

2 August 2016
18:45

Boxscore

Denmark	59–53	Netherlands
Scoring by quarter: 17–4, 16–25, 14–15, 12–9
Pts: Kristensen 15; Rebs: Bank 9 Asts: Jevrić 5		Pts: Poulina 18; Rebs: Ramović 6 Asts: Ververs 5

Sports Centre Jane Sandanski, Skopje
Referees: Branislav Mrdak (SRB), Aleksander Pavlov (MKD), Marko Vladić (AUT)

2 August 2016
21:00

Boxscore

Estonia	86–66	Iceland
Scoring by quarter: 18–13, 26–17, 21–21, 21–15
Pts: Kullamäe 31; Rebs: Tass 15; Asts: Tass 4		Pts: Þorbjarnarson 24; Rebs: Þorbjarnarson 8 Asts: Þorbjarnarson 3

Sports Centre Jane Sandanski, Skopje
Referees: Milija Vojinović (SRB), Milan Brziak (SVK), Mircea Constantin Serban (ROU)

3 August 2016
14:15

Boxscore

Luxembourg	52–83	Denmark
Scoring by quarter: 9–24, 14–19, 14–19, 15–21
Pts: Wolff 23; Rebs: Anđelković 5 Asts: P. Arendt 5		Pts: Knudsen 14; Rebs: Bank 12; Asts: Jørgensen 3

Sports Centre Boris Trajkovski, Skopje
Referees: Chris Dodds (SCO), Milan Brziak (SVK), Mircea Constantin Serban (ROU)

3 August 2016
16:30

Boxscore

Netherlands	66–77	Iceland
Scoring by quarter: 26–18, 10–18, 10–13, 20–28
Pts: Ramovic 15; Rebs: van der Vuurst de Vries 7 Asts: van der Vuurst de Vries 5		Pts: Þorbjarnarson 26; Rebs: Þorbjarnarson 8 Asts: Stefansson 4

Sports Centre Boris Trajkovski, Skopje
Referees: Milosav Kaluđerović (MNE), David Berishvili (GEO), Ventsislav Velikov (BUL)

3 August 2016
21:00

Boxscore

Czech Republic	58–65	Estonia
Scoring by quarter: 13–17, 12–12, 16–14, 17–22
Pts: Blaha 9 Rebs: Chaloupka 5 Asts: Chaloupka 3		Pts: Tass 19; Rebs: Tass 13; Asts: Tass 4

Sports Centre Boris Trajkovski, Skopje
Referees: Milivoje Jovčić (SRB), Marko Vladić (AUT), Ademir Zurapović (BIH)

=== Group D ===
Pos	Team	Pld	W	L	PF	PA	PD	Pts	Team advances to
1	Ukraine	5	4	1	398	313	+85	9	Quarterfinals
2	Slovakia	5	4	1	355	275	+80	9	Quarterfinals
3	Georgia	5	4	1	391	296	+95	9	9th – 16th place playoffs
4	England	5	2	3	361	302	+59	7	9th – 16th place playoffs
5	Scotland	5	1	4	303	427	−124	6	17th – 24th place playoffs
6	Albania	5	0	5	241	436	−195	5	17th – 24th place playoffs

Source: FIBA
Rules for classification: 1) Points; 2) Head-to-head results; 3) Points difference; 4) Points scored.

29 July 2016
18:45

Boxscore

Ukraine	74–65	England
Scoring by quarter: 18–16, 24–16, 11–14, 21–19
Pts: Tyrtyshnyk 22; Rebs: Skapintsev 15; Asts: Tyrtyshnyk 3		Pts: Mitchell 17; Rebs: Wheatle 16; Asts: Mitchell 3

Sports & Recreation Centre Kale, Skopje
Referees: Tomislav Hordov (CRO), Vincent Delestree (BEL), Aleksander Pavlov (MKD)

29 July 2016
21:00

Boxscore

Georgia	94–39	Albania
Scoring by quarter: 30–12, 26–10, 13–10, 25–7
Pts: Babilodze 17; Rebs: Bitadze 11; Asts: Akobia 5		Pts: Jareci 11; Rebs: Lilaj 7 Asts: Hysa 5

Sports & Recreation Centre Kale, Skopje
Referees: Bernard Vassallo (MLT), Marc Mouton (LUX), Andrei Sharapa (BLR)

29 July 2016
21:00

Boxscore

Slovakia	74–56	Scotland
Scoring by quarter: 22–18, 12–15, 15–16, 25–7
Pts: Ihring 17; Rebs: Dolezaj 11; Asts: Ihring 6		Pts: Jimenez 13; Rebs: Sirrell 4 Asts: Kantorski 4

Sports Centre Jane Sandanski, Skopje
Referees: Ademir Zurapović (BIH), Ilias Kounnelles (CYP), Preeda Muongmee (THA)

30 July 2016
16:30

Boxscore

Scotland	48–101	Georgia
Scoring by quarter: 12–23, 13–30, 17–25, 6–23
Pts: Jimenez 10; Rebs: Jimenez 11; Asts: Lancaster 3		Pts: Darbaidze 14; Rebs: Korsantia 18; Asts: Bulashvili 4

Sports Centre Boris Trajkovski, Skopje
Referees: Milan Adamović (BIH), Rune Ressel Larsen (DEN), Ivor Matejek (CZE)

30 July 2016
18:45

Boxscore

Albania	50–83	Ukraine
Scoring by quarter: 4–29, 21–6, 10–27, 15–11
Pts: Lilaj 13; Rebs: Lilaj 9 Asts: Pashaj 4		Pts: Niemtsu 15; Rebs: Nykolenko 8 Asts: Horobchenko 5

Sports Centre Jane Sandanski, Skopje
Referees: Branislav Mrdak (SRB), Leifur Garðarsson (ISL), Martins Kozlovskis (LAT)

30 July 2016
21:00

Boxscore

England	48–59	Slovakia
Scoring by quarter: 11–16, 11–16, 9–11, 17–16
Pts: Amabilino Perez 13; Rebs: Wheatle 9 Asts: Mitchell 3		Pts: Drgon 17; Rebs: Dolezaj 9 Asts: Ihring 4

Sports Centre Boris Trajkovski, Skopje
Referees: Georgios Poursanidis (GRE), Marc Mouton (LUX), Bernard Vassallo (MLT)

31 July 2016
18:45

Boxscore

Slovakia	61–78	Ukraine
Scoring by quarter: 25–14, 17–24, 11–22, 8–18
Pts: Drgon 18; Rebs: Drgon 9 Asts: Ihring 7		Pts: Tyrtyshnyk 19; Rebs: Skapintsev 12; Asts: Tyrtyshnyk 7

Sports Centre Jane Sandanski, Skopje
Referees: Milivoje Jovčić (SRB), Milosav Kaluđerović (MNE), Rune Ressel Larsen (DEN)

31 July 2016
21:00

Boxscore

Scotland	83–65	Albania
Scoring by quarter: 17–20, 23–8, 23–14, 20–23
Pts: Nealon-Lino 25; Rebs: Armour 9 Asts: Jimenez 5		Pts: Lilaj 13; Rebs: Hysa 7 Asts: Qilimi 3

Sports Centre Jane Sandanski, Skopje
Referees: Anastasios Manos (GRE), Marko Vladić (AUT), Dariusz Zapolski (POL)

31 July 2016
21:00

Boxscore

Georgia	76–70	England
Scoring by quarter: 15–29, 17–15, 24–8, 20–18
Pts: Bitadze 18; Rebs: Bitadze 15; Asts: Akobia 3		Pts: Boachie-Yiadom 14; Rebs: Wheatle 14; Asts: Wheatle 2

Sports & Recreation Centre Kale, Skopje
Referees: Milija Vojinović (SRB), Ventsislav (Velikov (BUL), Ademir Zurapović (BIH)

2 August 2016
14:15

Boxscore

England	95–51	Scotland
Scoring by quarter: 22–14, 29–13, 18–10, 26–14
Pts: Boachie-Yiadom 14; Rebs: Boachie-Yiadom 8 Asts: Wheatle 8		Pts: Jimenez 16; Rebs: Jimenez 5 Asts: Kantorski 4

Sports Centre Jane Sandanski, Skopje
Referees: Alexey Davydov (RUS), Ivor Matejek (CZE), Marc Mouton (LUX)

2 August 2016
16:30

Boxscore

Albania	45–93	Slovakia
Scoring by quarter: 11–23, 9–22, 17–21, 8–27
Pts: Lilaj 20; Rebs: Lilaj 6 Asts: Hysa 3		Pts: Drgon 12; Rebs: Dolezaj 13; Asts: Majercak 6

Sports Centre Boris Trajkovski, Skopje
Referees: Konstantin Simonow (GER), Sergei Beliakov (RUS), Vilius Maciulaitis (LTU)

2 August 2016
21:00

Boxscore

Ukraine	71–72	Georgia
Scoring by quarter: 20–19, 14–18, 27–14, 10–21
Pts: Horobchenko 18; Rebs: Skapintsev 8 Asts: Tyrtyshnyk 5		Pts: Bulashvili 20; Rebs: Korsantia 9 Asts: Bulashvili 5

Sports Centre Boris Trajkovski, Skopje
Referees: Aare Halliko (EST), Tomislav Hordov (CRO), Dariusz Zapolski (POL)

3 August 2016
12:00

Boxscore

England	83–42	Albania
Scoring by quarter: 13–8, 33–12, 17–10, 20–12
Pts: Wheatle 12; Rebs: Wheatle 7 Asts: Mitchell 2		Pts: Bedini 8 Rebs: Dedolli 7 Asts: Hysa 3

Sports Centre Boris Trajkovski, Skopje
Referees: Aleksander Pavlov (MKD), Ilias Kounelles (CYP), Rune Ressel Larssen (DEN)

3 August 2016
17:30

Boxscore

Scotland	65–92	Ukraine
Scoring by quarter: 13–31, 17–23, 20–24, 15–14
Pts: Sirrell 10; Rebs: Lancaster 5 Asts: Conway 4		Pts: Bondarchuk 21; Rebs: Frolov 6 Asts: Horobchenko 8

Sports & Recreation Centre Kale, Skopje
Referees: Sergei Beliakov (RUS), Vincent Delestree (BEL), Leifur Gardarsson (ISL)

3 August 2016
18:45

Boxscore

Georgia	48–68	Slovakia
Scoring by quarter: 16–16, 1219, 11–19, 9–14
Pts: Bulashvili 11; Rebs: Bitadze 13; Asts: Darbaidze 3		Pts: Dolezaj 16; Rebs: Dolezaj 14; Asts: Ihring 5

Sports Centre Jane Sandanski, Skopje
Referees: Branislav Mrdak (SRB), Anastasios Manos (GRE), Sergio Silva (POR)

== Classification round ==
=== 17th–24th place classification ===
17th–24th place quarterfinals
5 August
Cyprus	49
Austria	64
5 August
Scotland	61
Luxembourg	65
5 August
Romania	87
Ireland	81
5 August
Netherlands	92
Albania	50

17th–20th place semifinals
6 August
Austria	81
Luxembourg	72
6 August
Romania	57
Netherlands	69

17th place
7 August
Austria	64
Netherlands	85
19th place
7 August
Luxembourg	70
Romania	64

21st–24th place semifinals
6 August
Cyprus	52
Scotland	66
6 August
Ireland	68
Albania	69

21st place
7 August
Scotland	68
Albania	71
23rd place
7 August
Cyprus	56
Ireland	72

==== 17th–24th place quarterfinals ====
5 August 2016
12:00

Boxscore

Cyprus	49–64	Austria
Scoring by quarter: 16–14, 15–18, 10–16, 8–16
Pts: Andreou 8 Rebs: Doukanaris 15; Asts: Andreou 2		Pts: McCaw 20; Rebs: Hofbauer 8 Asts: Ernst 5

Sports Centre Jane Sandanski, Skopje
Referees: Vilius Maciulaitis (LTU), Vincent Delestree (BEL), Andrei Sharapa (BLR)

5 August 2016
14:15

Boxscore

Scotland	61–65	Luxembourg
Scoring by quarter: 18–26, 14–15, 8–15, 21–9
Pts: Jimenez 16; Rebs: Lancaster 6 Asts: Jimenez 3		Pts: Anđelković 18; Rebs: Cames 13; Asts: P. Arendt 4

Sports Centre Jane Sandanski, Skopje
Referees: Marko Vladić (AUT), Milan Adamović (BIH), David Berishvili (GEO)

5 August 2016
17:30

Boxscore

Romania	87–81	Ireland
Scoring by quarter: 21–26, 23–25, 18–16, 25–14
Pts: Berceanu 22; Rebs: Georgiadis 12; Asts: Girbea 6		Pts: Drummond 25; Rebs: Rockall 6 Asts: Rockall 5

Sports & Recreation Centre Kale, Skopje
Referees: Dariusz Zapolski (POL), Rune Ressel Larssen (DEN), Anastasios Manos (GRE)

5 August 2016
21:00

Boxscore

Netherlands	92–50	Albania
Scoring by quarter: 23–14, 21–15, 31–10, 17–11
Pts: Banda 13; Rebs: van der Vuurst de Vries 7 Asts: van der Vuurst de Vries 8		Pts: Lilaj 18; Rebs: Hysa 7 Asts: Hysa 4

Sports & Recreation Centre Kale, Skopje
Referees: Milan Brziak (SVK), Leifur Gardarsson (ISL), Marc Mouton (LUX)

==== 21st–24th place semifinals ====
6 August 2016
12:00

Boxscore

Cyprus	52–66	Scotland
Scoring by quarter: 7–23, 18–10, 9–17, 18–16
Pts: Evzonas 17; Rebs: Doukanaris 12; Asts: Andreou 4		Pts: Conway 21; Rebs: Ferguson 7 Asts: Ferguson 5

Sports Centre Jane Sandanski, Skopje
Referees: Aleksander Pavlov (MKD), Milosav Kaluđerović (MNE), Marc Mouton (LUX)

6 August 2016
17:30

Boxscore

Ireland	68–69	Albania
Scoring by quarter: 13–18, 24–14, 14–12, 17–25
Pts: Drummond 26; Rebs: Curran 8 Asts: Curran 3		Pts: Lilaj 15; Rebs: Jareci 9 Asts: Jareci 3

Sports & Recreation Centre Kale, Skopje
Referees: Sergei Beliakov (RUS), Vincent Delestree (BEL), Preeda Muongmee (THA)

==== 23rd place game ====
7 August 2016
12:00

Boxscore

Cyprus	56–72	Ireland
Scoring by quarter: 18–12, 7–20, 20–21, 11–19
Pts: Evzonas 12; Rebs: Stavrinides 12; Asts: Andreou 6		Pts: Treacy 27; Rebs: Treacy 13; Asts: Rockall 4

Sports & Recreation Centre Kale, Skopje
Referees: Ademir Zurapović (BIH), Bernard Vassallo (MLT), Dariusz Zapolski (POL)

==== 21st place game ====
7 August 2016
12:00

Boxscore

Scotland	68–71	Albania
Scoring by quarter: 21–19, 8–19, 15–14, 24–19
Pts: Jimenez 17; Rebs: Nealon-Lino 10; Asts: Lancaster 3		Pts: Lilaj 17; Rebs: Lilaj 9 Asts: Hysa 3

Sports Centre Jane Sandanski, Skopje
Referees: Rune Ressel Larssen (DEN), Milan Adamović (BIH), Mircea Constantin Serban (ROU)

==== 17th–20th place semifinals ====
6 August 2016
14:15

Boxscore

Austria	81–72	Luxembourg
Scoring by quarter: 24–16, 18–19, 11–17, 28–20
Pts: John 22; Rebs: Hofbauer 9 Asts: Ohakwe 3		Pts: Anđelković 21; Rebs: Cames 8 Asts: P. Arendt 7

Sports Centre Jane Sandanski, Skopje
Referees: Aare Halliko (EST), Martins Kozlovskis (LAT), Anastasios Manos (GRE)

6 August 2016
21:00

Boxscore

Romania	57–69	Netherlands
Scoring by quarter: 12–10, 25–19, 11–22, 9–18
Pts: Darwiche 17; Rebs: Dunca 7 Asts: Darwiche 2		Pts: Bouwer 16; Rebs: Ververs 7 Asts: Ververs 6

Sports & Recreation Centre Kale, Skopje
Referees: Georgios Poursanidis (GRE), Milan Adamović (BIH), Andrei Sharapa (BLR)

==== 19th place game ====
7 August 2016
18:00

Boxscore

Luxembourg	70–64	Romania
Scoring by quarter: 14–16, 12–23, 22–10, 22–15
Pts: Anđelković 19; Rebs: P. Arent 9 Asts: P. Arent 7		Pts: Dunca 17; Rebs: Berceanu 6 Asts: Darwiche 5

Sports & Recreation Centre Kale, Skopje
Referees: Milija Vojinović (SRB), Vincent Delestree (BEL), Paul Unsworth (ENG)

==== 17th place game ====
7 August 2016
15:00

Boxscore

Austria	64–85	Netherlands
Scoring by quarter: 18–21, 23–20, 16–21, 7–23
Pts: Brajković 18; Rebs: Hofbauer 10; Asts: John 6		Pts: Nossek 15; Rebs: Nossek 7 Asts: van der Vuurst de Vries 6

Sports & Recreation Centre Kale, Skopje
Referees: Sergei Beliakov (RUS), Ilias Kounelles (CYP), Preeda Muongmee (THA)

=== 9th–16th place classification ===
9th–16th place quarterfinals
5 August
Bulgaria	92
Portugal	67
5 August
Georgia	63
Denmark	60
5 August
Belarus	83
Macedonia	82
5 August
Iceland	64
England	70

9th–12th place semifinals
6 August
Bulgaria	101
Georgia	103
6 August
Belarus	64
England	81

Ninth place
7 August
Georgia	81
England	85
Eleventh place
7 August
Bulgaria	74
Belarus	75

13th–16th place semifinals
6 August
Portugal	65
Denmark	46
6 August
Macedonia	84
Iceland	94

13th place
7 August
Portugal	60
Iceland	64
15th place
7 August
Denmark	85
Macedonia	61

==== 9th–16th place quarterfinals ====
5 August 2016
12:00

Boxscore

Bulgaria	92–67	Portugal
Scoring by quarter: 24–23, 15–15, 28–19, 25–10

Sports Centre Boris Trajkovski, Skopje

5 August 2016
16:30

Boxscore

Georgia	63–60	Denmark
Scoring by quarter: 8–15, 20–15, 15–14, 20–16

Sports Centre Jane Sandanski, Skopje

5 August 2016
18:45

Boxscore

Belarus	83–82	Macedonia
Scoring by quarter: 22–23, 18–10, 18–30, 25–19

Sports Centre Jane Sandanski, Skopje

5 August 2016
21:00

Boxscore

Iceland	64–70	England
Scoring by quarter: 8–19, 14–16, 26–15, 16–20

Sports Centre Jane Sandanski, Skopje

==== 13th–16th place semifinals ====
6 August 2016
16:30

Boxscore

Portugal	65–46	Denmark
Scoring by quarter: 13–11, 21–13, 16–18, 15–4

Sports Centre Jane Sandanski, Skopje

6 August 2016
18:45

Boxscore

Macedonia	84–94	Iceland
Scoring by quarter: 17–22, 32–27, 18–23, 17–22

Sports Centre Jane Sandanski, Skopje

==== 15th place game ====
7 August 2016
14:15

Boxscore

Denmark	85–61	Macedonia
Scoring by quarter: 16–17, 19–18, 27–10, 23–16

Sports Centre Jane Sandanski, Skopje

==== 13th place game ====
7 August 2016
16:30

Boxscore

Portugal	60–64	Iceland
Scoring by quarter: 12–12, 17–15, 18–19, 13–18

Sports Centre Jane Sandanski, Skopje

==== 9th–12th place semifinals ====
6 August 2016
12:00

Boxscore

Bulgaria	101–103	Georgia
Scoring by quarter: 15–26, 26–14, 19–19, 27–28

Sports Centre Boris Trajkovski, Skopje

6 August 2016
21:00

Boxscore

Belarus	64–81	England
Scoring by quarter: 14–18, 20–21, 19–22, 11–20

Sports Centre Jane Sandanski, Skopje

==== Eleventh place game ====
7 August 2016
18:45

Boxscore

Bulgaria	74–75	Belarus
Scoring by quarter: 17–14, 23–18, 14–23, 20–20

Sports Centre Jane Sandanski, Skopje

==== Ninth place game ====
7 August 2016
16:30

Boxscore

Georgia	81–85	England
Scoring by quarter: 26–21, 21–13, 19–33, 15–18

Sports Centre Boris Trajkovski, Skopje

=== 5th–8th place classification ===
5th–8th place semifinals
6 August
Belgium	74
Czech Republic	58
6 August
Poland	86
Estonia	60

Fifth place
7 August
Belgium	71
Poland	51
Seventh place
7 August
Czech Republic	65
Estonia	78

==== 5th–8th place semifinals ====
6 August 2016
14:15

Boxscore

Belgium	74–58	Czech Republic
Scoring by quarter: 25–16, 21–11, 12–11, 16–20

Sports Centre Boris Trajkovski, Skopje

6 August 2016
16:30

Boxscore

Poland	86–60	Estonia
Scoring by quarter: 14–14, 21–14, 21–22, 30–10

Sports Centre Boris Trajkovski, Skopje

==== Seventh place game ====
7 August 2016
12:00

Boxscore

Czech Republic	65–78	Estonia
Scoring by quarter: 13–15, 20–19, 9–24, 23–20

Sports Centre Boris Trajkovski, Skopje

==== Fifth place game ====
7 August 2016
14:15

Boxscore

Belgium	71–51	Poland
Scoring by quarter: 20–10, 12–15, 16–16, 23–10

Sports Centre Boris Trajkovski, Skopje

== Final round ==
Quarterfinals
5 August
Hungary	68
Belgium	63
5 August
Ukraine	67
Czech Republic	62
5 August
Montenegro	75
Poland	53
5 August
Estonia	67
Slovakia	71

Semifinals
6 August
Hungary	58
Ukraine	78
6 August
Montenegro	87
Slovakia	72

Final
7 August
Ukraine	72
Montenegro	83
Third place
7 August
Hungary	62
Slovakia	63

=== Quarterfinals ===
5 August 2016
14:15

Boxscore

Hungary	68–63	Belgium
Scoring by quarter: 16–20, 12–21, 29–6, 11–16

Sports Centre Boris Trajkovski, Skopje

5 August 2016
16:30

Boxscore

Ukraine	67–62	Czech Republic
Scoring by quarter: 23–10, 14–11, 18–18, 12–23

Sports Centre Boris Trajkovski, Skopje

5 August 2016
18:45

Boxscore

Estonia	67–71	Slovakia
Scoring by quarter: 16–15, 13–17, 12–18, 26–21

Sports Centre Boris Trajkovski, Skopje

5 August 2016
21:00

Boxscore

Montenegro	75–53	Poland
Scoring by quarter: 27–16, 21–18, 8–3, 19–16

Sports Centre Boris Trajkovski, Skopje

=== Semifinals ===
6 August 2016
18:45

Boxscore

Hungary	58–78	Ukraine
Scoring by quarter: 20–20, 23–13, 12–27, 3–18

Sports Centre Boris Trajkovski, Skopje

6 August 2016
21:00

Boxscore

Montenegro	87–72	Slovakia
Scoring by quarter: 22–19, 29–20, 11–16, 25–17

Sports Centre Boris Trajkovski, Skopje

=== Third place game ===
7 August 2016
18:45

Boxscore

Hungary	62–63	Slovakia
Scoring by quarter: 4–6, 20–10, 17–21, 21–26

Sports Centre Boris Trajkovski, Skopje

=== Final ===
7 August 2016
21:00

Boxscore

Ukraine	72–83	Montenegro
Scoring by quarter: 22–16, 12–27, 20–24, 18–16

Sports Centre Boris Trajkovski, Skopje
Attendance: 1000
Referees: Georgios Poursanidis (GRE), Aleksander Pavlov (MKD), Andrei Sharapa (BLR)

== Final standings ==
Rank	Team	Record
Gold medal	Montenegro	8–0
Silver medal	Ukraine	6–2
Bronze medal	Slovakia	6–2
4th	Hungary	6–2
5th	Belgium	5–3
6th	Poland	5–3
7th	Estonia	5–3
8th	Czech Republic	4–4
9th	England	5–3
10th	Georgia	6–2
11th	Belarus	5–3
12th	Bulgaria	4–4
13th	Iceland	5–3
14th	Portugal	3–5
15th	Denmark	4–4
16th	Macedonia	2–6
17th	Netherlands	4–4
18th	Austria	3–5
19th	Luxembourg	2–6
20th	Romania	2–6
21st	Albania	2–6
22nd	Scotland	2–6
23rd	Ireland	1–7
24th	Cyprus	1–7

Promoted to the 2017 FIBA U18 European Championship Division A
Relegated to the 2017 FIBA U18 European Championship Division C
