= Jessey Voorn =

Dutch basketball player

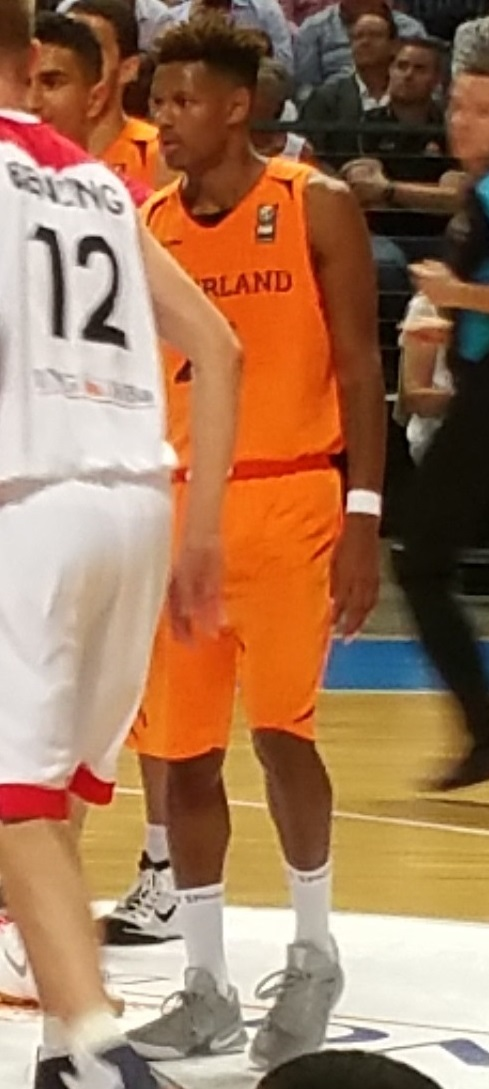
- Voorn playing for the Netherlands in 2016

Personal information
- Born: 17 March 1990 (age 36) Amsterdam, Netherlands
- Listed height: 6 ft 4 in (1.93 m)
- Listed weight: 84 kg (185 lb)

Career information
- High school: Jonesboro (Jonesboro, Georgia)
- Playing career: 2007–2019
- Position: Shooting guard

Career history
- 2007–2011: ABC Amsterdam
- 2011–2014: GasTerra Flames
- 2015: Canarias CBA
- 2015–2016: Landstede Zwolle
- 2016–2018: ZZ Leiden
- 2018–2019: Heroes Den Bosch

Career highlights
- 3× DBL champion (2008, 2009, 2014); Dutch Cup champion (2014); 3× DBL MVP Under 23 (2010, 2011, 2013); 5× DBL All-Star (2011, 2013, 2014, 2016, 2017)

Jessey Anthony Voorn (born 17 March 1990 in Amsterdam) is a Dutch professional DJ and basketball player who last played for Heroes Den Bosch. Voorn is 6 ft 4 tall and plays the shooting guard position.

== Professional career ==
Voorn started his professional career with ABC Amsterdam in 2007, where he was mainly on the bench at first. With Amsterdam he won the Dutch championship in 2009. When the club was forced to play without foreign players, Voorn got major minutes with ABC. In the 2010–11 season Voorn averaged 13.7 points per game in the Dutch Basketball League.

After his break-out season, the club from Amsterdam went bankrupt and Voorn went to Groningen to play for the GasTerra Flames. After the 2013–14 season, Voorn left Groningen.

He signed with Canarias Basketball Academy in January 2015.

For the 2014–15 season, Voorn signed with Landstede Basketbal.

On 1 July 2016, he signed a two-year deal with Zorg en Zekerheid Leiden.

On 14 June 2018, Voorn signed a two-year contract with New Heroes Den Bosch. On 15 November 2019, Voorn and Den Bosch agreed to part ways.

After this, he decided to dedicate fully to his DJ career, where he performs under the stage name MARRØN.

== 3x3 basketball ==
In 2020, Voorn joined the Netherlands national 3x3 team. He played at the 2020 Summer Olympics in Tokyo, where the team finished in the fifth place.
