= Finland men's national under-18 basketball team =

Youth basketball team representing Finland

Finland
- FIBA zone: FIBA Europe
- National federation: Basketball Finland

U19 World Cup
- Appearances: None

U18 EuroBasket
- Appearances: 17
- Medals: None

U18 EuroBasket Division B
- Appearances: 11
- Medals: Silver: 1 (2010); Bronze: 2 (2014, 2022)

The Finland men's national under-18 basketball team is a national basketball team of Finland, administered by Basketball Finland. It represents the country in international under-18 men's basketball competitions.

== FIBA U18 EuroBasket participations ==
Year	Position
(Italy) 1964	Did not participate
(Italy) 1966	8th
(Spain) 1968	8th
(Greece) 1970	Did not participate
(Socialist Federal Republic of Yugoslavia) 1972	Did not participate
(France) 1974	15th
(Spain) 1976	13th
(Italy) 1978	Did not participate
(Socialist Federal Republic of Yugoslavia) 1980	Did not participate
(Bulgaria) 1982	8th
(Sweden) 1984	7th
(Austria) 1986	7th
(Socialist Federal Republic of Yugoslavia) 1988	11th
(Netherlands) 1990	Did not participate
(Hungary) 1992	8th
(Israel) 1994	Did not participate
(France) 1996	Did not participate
(Bulgaria) 1998	Did not participate
(Croatia) 2000	Did not participate
(Germany) 2002	Did not participate
(Spain) 2004	Did not participate

Year	Position
(Slovakia) Division-B 2005	4th
(Romania) Division-B 2006	12th
(Bulgaria) Division-B 2007	9th
(Hungary) Division-B 2008	10th
(France) 2009	Did not participate
(Israel) Division-B 2010	2nd
(Poland) 2011	16th
(Bosnia and Herzegovina) Division-B 2012	4th
(North Macedonia) Division-B 2013	9th
(Bulgaria) Division-B 2014	3rd
(Greece) 2015	13th
(Turkey) 2016	8th
(Slovakia) 2017	10th
(Latvia) 2018	13th
(Greece) 2019	14th
(Romania) Division-B 2022	3rd
(Serbia) 2023	15th
(Finland) 2024	15th
(Romania) Division-B 2025	18th
(Croatia) Division-B 2026	11th

== Former players ==
- Joonas Iisalo
- Mikael Jantunen

== See also ==
- Finland men's national basketball team
- Finland men's national under-16 and under-17 basketball team
- Finland women's national under-18 basketball team
