= Calvin Poulina =

Dutch basketball player

No. 13 – Bethune Cookman Binghamton Bearcats
- Position: Forward
- League: American East (basketball)

Personal information
- Born: 23 November 1999 (age 26) Leiden
- Listed height: 2.03 m (6 ft 8 in)

Career information
- College: Bethune Cookman, Binghamton (2018–present)
- Playing career: 2012–present

Career history
- 2012-2017: ZZ Leiden
- 2017–2018: Get Better Academy

Calvin Johannes Poulina (born 23 November 1999) is a Dutch basketball player, who currently plays for the Bethune Cookman University men's basketball team.

== Early career ==
While also playing for the youth teams of ZZ Leiden, Poulina made his debut with the professional team of the club in the 2015–16 season at age 16. In the 2016–17 season, he played in nine Dutch Basketball League (DBL) games with the team and averaged 2.6 minutes.

For the 2017–18 season, he left for Czech club Get Better Academy (GBA), which plays in the 1.Liga, the Czech second-level league.

== College career ==
In June 2018, Poulina committed to the Binghamton Bearcats men's basketball team.

== National team career ==
Poulina played with the Netherlands under-16 national basketball team at the 2017 FIBA Europe Under-16 Championship.
