= Armand Salomon =

Dutch basketball coach (born 1962)

Rotterdam City
- Position: Technical Director
- League: Dutch Basketball League

Personal information
- Born: 2 February 1962 (age 64) The Hague, Netherlands
- Coaching career: 2014–present

Career history

Coaching
- 2013–2014: Rotterdam (assistant)
- 2013–2014: Rotterdam 2
- 2014–2018: Rotterdam
- 2023: Feyenoord (interim head coach)

Armand Salomon (born 2 February 1962) is a Dutch basketball coach and executive. He currently serves as the Technical Director for Rotterdam City Basketball of the Dutch Basketball League (DBL). From 2014 until 2018, and in 2023, he coached Rotterdam.

== Coaching career ==
On 16 May 2014, Salomon was appointed head coach of Rotterdam Basketbal. In May 2018, Rotterdam reached the DBL semi-finals for the first time in 12 years, after upsetting Den Bosch in the quarter-finals, 1–2.

On 23 June 2018, Salomon became director of Feyenoord Basketball, the new name of the club, while Richard den Os took over head coaching duties.

After five years without coaching, Salomon took over Feyenoord again in April 2023 after he and the management had made the decision to fire head coach Toon van Helfteren. He later returned to being the technical director again.

== Coaching record ==
=== Dutch Basketball League ===
Team	Year	G	W	L	W–L%	Result
Rotterdam	2014–15	30	8	22	.267	Lost in quarterfinals
Rotterdam	2015–16	30	9	21	.300	Lost in quarterfinals
Rotterdam	2016–17	30	12	18	.400	Lost in quarterfinals
Rotterdam	2017–18	39	17	22	.436	Lost in semi-finals
Career		129	46	83	.357	
