= Belarus men's national under-18 basketball team =

Belarus
- FIBA zone: FIBA Europe
- National federation: Belarusian Basketball Federation

Under-19 World Cup
- Appearances: None

U18 European Championship
- Appearances: None

U18 European Championship Division B
- Appearances: 10
- Medals: None
| Home | Away |

The Belarus men's national under-18 basketball team is a national basketball team of Belarus, administered by the Belarusian Basketball Federation. It represented the country in international men's under-18 basketball competitions.

After the 2022 Russian invasion of Ukraine, the FIBA suspended Belarus from participating in basketball and 3x3 basketball competitions.

== FIBA U18 European Championship participations ==
| Year | Result in Division B |
|---|---|
| 2008 | 14th |
| 2009 | 19th |
| 2010 | 9th |
| 2012 | 18th |
| 2013 | 12th |

| Year | Result in Division B |
|---|---|
| 2015 | 18th |
| 2016 | 11th |
| 2017 | 20th |
| 2018 | 6th |
| 2019 | 13th |

== See also ==
- Belarus men's national basketball team
- Belarus men's national under-16 basketball team
- Belarus women's national under-18 basketball team
