= 2023 FIBA U18 European Championship =

International basketball competition

Европско првенство у кошарци за играче до 18 година 2023.

Tournament details
- Host country: Serbia
- City: Niš
- Dates: 22–30 July 2023
- Teams: 16 (from 1 confederation)
- Venues: 2 (in 1 host city)

Final positions
- Champions: Serbia (5th title)
- Runners-up: Spain
- Third place: Germany

Official website
- www.fiba.basketball

The 2023 FIBA U18 European Championship was the 38th edition of the European basketball championship for men's national under-18 teams. It was played from 22 to 30 July 2023 in Niš, Serbia.

== Participating teams ==
- Croatia
- Czech Republic
- Denmark ▲ (Runners-up, 2022 FIBA U18 European Championship Division B)
- Finland ▲ (Third place, 2022 FIBA U18 European Championship Division B)
- France
- Germany
- Greece
- Israel
- Italy
- Lithuania
- Poland
- Serbia
- Slovenia
- Spain
- Sweden ▲ (Winners, 2022 FIBA U18 European Championship Division B)
- Turkey

== First round ==
The draw of the first round was held on 14 February 2023 in Freising, Germany.

In the first round, the teams were drawn into four groups of four. All teams advance to the playoffs.

All times are local (Central European Summer Time – UTC+2).

=== Group A ===
Pos	Team	Pld	W	L	PF	PA	PD	Pts
1	France	3	3	0	261	187	+74	6
2	Israel	3	2	1	257	253	+4	5
3	Lithuania	3	1	2	266	273	−7	4
4	Sweden	3	0	3	200	271	−71	3

Source: FIBA

22 July 2023
15:30

Boxscore

Israel	101–98	Lithuania
Scoring by quarter: 16–24, 28–19, 33–24, 24–31

Čair Sports Center, Niš

22 July 2023
20:30

Boxscore

Sweden	48–86	France
Scoring by quarter: 8–20, 9–27, 17–20, 14–19

OŠ Mika Antić, Niš

23 July 2023
15:30

Boxscore

Lithuania	99–80	Sweden
Scoring by quarter: 23–15, 28–17, 25–26, 23–22

OŠ Mika Antić, Niš

23 July 2023
18:00

Boxscore

France	83–70	Israel
Scoring by quarter: 25–18, 25–18, 16–16, 17–18

OŠ Mika Antić, Niš

24 July 2023
13:00

Boxscore

Israel	86–72	Sweden
Scoring by quarter: 17–17, 23–23, 34–14, 12–18

Čair Sports Center, Niš

24 July 2023
18:00

Boxscore

France	92–69	Lithuania
Scoring by quarter: 20–15, 24–14, 19–16, 29–24

Čair Sports Center, Niš

=== Group B ===
Pos	Team	Pld	W	L	PF	PA	PD	Pts
1	Germany	3	3	0	239	182	+57	6
2	Turkey	3	2	1	226	203	+23	5
3	Croatia	3	1	2	195	218	−23	4
4	Poland	3	0	3	181	235	−54	3

Source: FIBA

22 July 2023
15:30

Boxscore

Croatia	53–81	Germany
Scoring by quarter: 10–29, 21–19, 12–20, 10–13

OŠ Mika Antić, Niš

22 July 2023
18:00

Boxscore

Poland	63–78	Turkey
Scoring by quarter: 9–17, 20–20, 22–21, 12–20

OŠ Mika Antić, Niš

23 July 2023
13:00

Boxscore

Germany	84–62	Poland
Scoring by quarter: 29–13, 17–18, 23–22, 15–9

Čair Sports Center, Niš

23 July 2023
18:00

Boxscore

Turkey	81–69	Croatia
Scoring by quarter: 19–15, 12–17, 23–23, 27–14

Čair Sports Center, Niš

24 July 2023
13:00

Boxscore

Croatia	73–56	Poland
Scoring by quarter: 14–15, 17–12, 23–13, 19–16

OŠ Mika Antić, Niš

24 July 2023
15:30

Boxscore

Turkey	67–74	Germany
Scoring by quarter: 20–14, 13–26, 14–18, 20–16

OŠ Mika Antić, Niš

=== Group C ===
Pos	Team	Pld	W	L	PF	PA	PD	Pts
1	Serbia (H)	3	3	0	284	192	+92	6
2	Slovenia	3	2	1	231	198	+33	5
3	Finland	3	1	2	209	238	−29	4
4	Czech Republic	3	0	3	180	276	−96	3

Source: FIBA
(H) Hosts

22 July 2023
13:00

Boxscore

Finland	63–78	Slovenia
Scoring by quarter: 11–27, 18–15, 22–15, 12–21

OŠ Mika Antić, Niš

22 July 2023
20:30

Boxscore

Czech Republic	56–113	Serbia
Scoring by quarter: 9–39, 13–28, 17–26, 17–20

Čair Sports Center, Niš

23 July 2023
15:30

Boxscore

Slovenia	89–60	Czech Republic
Scoring by quarter: 27–14, 33–20, 12–13, 17–13

Čair Sports Center, Niš

23 July 2023
20:30

Boxscore

Serbia	96–72	Finland
Scoring by quarter: 19–12, 21–17, 24–25, 32–18

Čair Sports Center, Niš

24 July 2023
18:00

Boxscore

Finland	74–64	Czech Republic
Scoring by quarter: 10–15, 17–14, 21–23, 26–12

OŠ Mika Antić, Niš

24 July 2023
20:30

Boxscore

Serbia	75–64	Slovenia
Scoring by quarter: 20–21, 21–11, 18–12, 16–20

Čair Sports Center, Niš

=== Group D ===
Pos	Team	Pld	W	L	PF	PA	PD	Pts
1	Spain	3	3	0	249	195	+54	6
2	Greece	3	2	1	254	241	+13	5
3	Italy	3	1	2	248	243	+5	4
4	Denmark	3	0	3	216	288	−72	3

Source: FIBA

22 July 2023
13:00

Boxscore

Denmark	64–88	Spain
Scoring by quarter: 16–30, 6–21, 24–19, 18–18

Čair Sports Center, Niš

22 July 2023
18:00

Boxscore

Greece	88–83	Italy
Scoring by quarter: 15–26, 23–12, 20–16, 30–29

Čair Sports Center, Niš

23 July 2023
13:00

Boxscore

Italy	93–77	Denmark
Scoring by quarter: 26–12, 22–18, 24–19, 21–28

OŠ Mika Antić, Niš

23 July 2023
20:30

Boxscore

Spain	83–59	Greece
Scoring by quarter: 23–22, 26–12, 20–9, 14–16

OŠ Mika Antić, Niš

24 July 2023
15:30

Boxscore

Greece	107–75	Denmark
Scoring by quarter: 27–18, 26–18, 28–17, 26–22

Čair Sports Center, Niš

24 July 2023
20:30

Boxscore

Spain	78–72	Italy
Scoring by quarter: 18–24, 18–12, 21–12, 21–24

OŠ Mika Antić, Niš

== Playoff brackets ==
=== Main bracket ===
Round of 16
26 July 18:00
France	94
Poland	54
26 July 20:30
Slovenia	86
Italy	73
26 July 13:00
Turkey	76
Lithuania	72
26 July 15:30
Spain	77
Czech Republic	64
26 July 18:00
Israel	84
Croatia	66
26 July 20:30
Serbia	107
Denmark	62
26 July 13:00
Germany	93
Sweden	77
26 July 15:30
Greece	88
Finland	70

Quarter-finals
27 July 18:00
France	81
Slovenia	62
27 July 13:00
Turkey	67
Spain	75
27 July 20:30
Israel	65
Serbia	83
27 July 15:30
Germany	78
Greece	70

Semi-finals
29 July 18:00
France	58
Spain	70
29 July 20:30
Serbia	65
Germany	54

Final
30 July 20:30
Spain	71
Serbia	81
3rd place match
30 July 18:00
France	59
Germany	67

=== 5th place bracket ===
5th–8th place semi-finals
29 July 13:00
Slovenia	73
Turkey	84
29 July 15:30
Israel	88
Greece	77

5th place match
30 July 13:00
Turkey	90
Israel	88
7th place match
30 July 13:00
Slovenia	62
Greece	66

=== 9th place bracket ===
9th–16th place quarterfinals
27 July 18:00
Poland	83
Italy	93
27 July 13:00
Lithuania	95
Czech Republic	59
27 July 20:30
Croatia	90
Denmark	66
27 July 15:30
Sweden	72
Finland	58

9th–12th place semi-finals
29 July 18:00
Italy	89
Lithuania	87
29 July 20:30
Croatia	87
Sweden	85

9th place match
30 July 18:00
Italy	76
Croatia	61
11th place match
30 July 15:30
Lithuania	82
Sweden	79

=== 13th place bracket ===
13th–16th place semi-finals
29 July 13:00
Poland	69
Czech Republic	50
29 July 15:30
Denmark	92
Finland	70

13th place match
30 July 15:30
Poland	87
Denmark	102
15th place match
30 July 10:30
Czech Republic	76
Finland	81

== Playoff results ==
=== Round of 16 ===
26 July 2023
13:00

Boxscore

Turkey	76–72	Lithuania
Scoring by quarter: 17–23, 20–14, 16–14, 23–21

OŠ Mika Antić, Niš

26 July 2023
13:00

Boxscore

Germany	93–77	Sweden
Scoring by quarter: 22–23, 32–22, 25–13, 14–19

Čair Sports Center, Niš

26 July 2023
15:30

Boxscore

Greece	88–70	Finland
Scoring by quarter: 30–15, 18–24, 21–10, 19–21

Čair Sports Center, Niš

26 July 2023
15:30

Boxscore

Spain	77–64	Czech Republic
Scoring by quarter: 30–15, 21–21, 16–13, 10–15

OŠ Mika Antić, Niš

26 July 2023
18:00

Boxscore

France	94–54	Poland
Scoring by quarter: 26–13, 23–23, 19–6, 26–12

OŠ Mika Antić, Niš

26 July 2023
18:00

Boxscore

Israel	84–66	Croatia
Scoring by quarter: 19–18, 19–17, 27–19, 19–12

Čair Sports Center, Niš

26 July 2023
20:30

Boxscore

Serbia	107–62	Denmark
Scoring by quarter: 23–12, 28–16, 24–6, 32–28

Čair Sports Center, Niš

26 July 2023
20:30

Boxscore

Slovenia	86–73	Italy
Scoring by quarter: 20–21, 24–18, 14–23, 28–11

OŠ Mika Antić, Niš

=== 9th–16th place quarterfinals ===
27 July 2023
13:00

Boxscore

Lithuania	95–59	Czech Republic
Scoring by quarter: 29–15, 21–25, 20–14, 25–5

OŠ Mika Antić, Niš

27 July 2023
15:30

Boxscore

Sweden	72–58	Finland
Scoring by quarter: 13–10, 17–33, 15–11, 27–4

OŠ Mika Antić, Niš

27 July 2023
18:00

Boxscore

Poland	83–93	Italy
Scoring by quarter: 25–16, 17–21, 19–24, 22–32

OŠ Mika Antić, Niš

27 July 2023
20:30

Boxscore

Croatia	90–66	Denmark
Scoring by quarter: 21–21, 25–10, 17–16, 27–19

OŠ Mika Antić, Niš

=== 13th–16th place semi-finals ===
29 July 2023
13:00

Boxscore

Poland	69–50	Czech Republic
Scoring by quarter: 15–7, 24–13, 10–13, 20–17

OŠ Mika Antić, Niš

29 July 2023
15:30

Boxscore

Denmark	92–70	Finland
Scoring by quarter: 28–17, 21–28, 18–11, 25–14

OŠ Mika Antić, Niš

=== 15th place match ===
30 July 2023
10:30

Boxscore

Czech Republic	76–81	Finland
Scoring by quarter: 24–22, 18–18, 12–22, 22–19

OŠ Mika Antić, Niš

=== 13th place match ===
30 July 2023
15:30

Boxscore

Poland	87–102	Denmark
Scoring by quarter: 21–23, 21–17, 14–27, 31–35

Čair Sports Center, Niš

=== 9th–12th place semi-finals ===
29 July 2023
18:00

Boxscore

Italy	89–87 (OT)	Lithuania
Scoring by quarter: 20–19, 15–20, 24–20, 20–20, Overtime: 10–8

OŠ Mika Antić, Niš

29 July 2023
20:30

Boxscore

Croatia	87–85 (OT)	Sweden
Scoring by quarter: 21–15, 15–9, 20–32, 22–22, Overtime: 9–7

OŠ Mika Antić, Niš

=== 11th place match ===
30 July 2023
15:30

Boxscore

Lithuania	82–79	Sweden
Scoring by quarter: 25–9, 20–20, 17–19, 20–31

OŠ Mika Antić, Niš

=== 9th place match ===
30 July 2023
18:00

Boxscore

Italy	76–61	Croatia
Scoring by quarter: 18–12, 14–14, 21–13, 23–22

OŠ Mika Antić, Niš

=== Championship quarterfinals ===
27 July 2023
13:00

Boxscore

Turkey	67–75	Spain
Scoring by quarter: 18–24, 14–14, 21–19, 14–18

Čair Sports Center, Niš

27 July 2023
15:30

Boxscore

Germany	78–70	Greece
Scoring by quarter: 18–17, 20–17, 20–18, 20–18

Čair Sports Center, Niš

27 July 2023
18:00

Boxscore

France	81–62	Slovenia
Scoring by quarter: 20–20, 18–14, 22–10, 21–18

Čair Sports Center, Niš

27 July 2023
20:30

Boxscore

Israel	65–83	Serbia
Scoring by quarter: 15–20, 14–23, 19–15, 17–25

Čair Sports Center, Niš

=== 5th–8th place semi-finals ===
29 July 2023
13:00

Boxscore

Slovenia	73–84	Turkey
Scoring by quarter: 12–19, 18–23, 20–26, 23–16

Čair Sports Center, Niš

29 July 2023
15:30

Boxscore

Israel	88–77	Greece
Scoring by quarter: 28–21, 32–15, 9–26, 19–15

Čair Sports Center, Niš

=== 7th place match ===
30 July 2023
13:00

Boxscore

Slovenia	62–66	Greece
Scoring by quarter: 20–19, 12–21, 13–5, 17–21

OŠ Mika Antić, Niš

=== 5th place match ===
30 July 2023
13:00

Boxscore

Turkey	90–88	Israel
Scoring by quarter: 18–20, 23–18, 23–20, 26–32

Čair Sports Center, Niš

=== Championship semi-finals ===
29 July 2023
18:00

Boxscore

France	58–70	Spain
Scoring by quarter: 14–5, 10–26, 17–16, 17–23

Čair Sports Center, Niš

29 July 2023
20:30

Boxscore

Serbia	65–54	Germany
Scoring by quarter: 17–16, 21–17, 19–12, 8–9

Čair Sports Center, Niš

=== 3rd place match ===
30 July 2023
18:00

Boxscore

France	59–67	Germany
Scoring by quarter: 14–22, 17–13, 16–13, 12–19

Čair Sports Center, Niš

=== Final ===
30 July 2023
20:30

Boxscore

Spain	71–81	Serbia
Scoring by quarter: 24–24, 16–17, 11–15, 20–25

Čair Sports Center, Niš

== Final standings ==
Rank	Team	Record
1st place, gold medalist(s)	Serbia	7–0
2nd place, silver medalist(s)	Spain	6–1
3rd place, bronze medalist(s)	Germany	6–1
4	France	5–2
5	Turkey	5–2
6	Israel	4–3
7	Greece	4–3
8	Slovenia	3–4
9	Italy	4–3
10	Croatia	3–4
11	Lithuania	3–4
12	Sweden	1–6
13	Denmark	2–5
14	Poland	1–6
15	Finland	2–5
16	Czech Republic	0–7

Relegated to the 2024 FIBA U18 EuroBasket Division B

== Awards ==
2023 FIBA Europe
Under-18 Championship winner

Serbia
Fifth title

Most Valuable Player
(Serbia) Nikola Topić

All-Tournament Team

- PG – (Serbia) Nikola Topić – (MVP)
- SG – (Germany) Ivan Kharchenkov
- SF – (Spain) Hugo González
- PF – (Serbia) Bogoljub Marković
- C – (Spain) Aday Mara

== See also ==
- 2023 FIBA U18 European Championship Division B
