= DBL Play-offs MVP =

The DBL Play-offs MVP is an annual Dutch Basketball League award given since to the league's most valuable player in the Playoffs of a given DBL season. The award was handed out for the first time in the 2004–05 season, but after then the award disappeared. In the 2013–14 season, the award would be handed out again.

== Winners ==
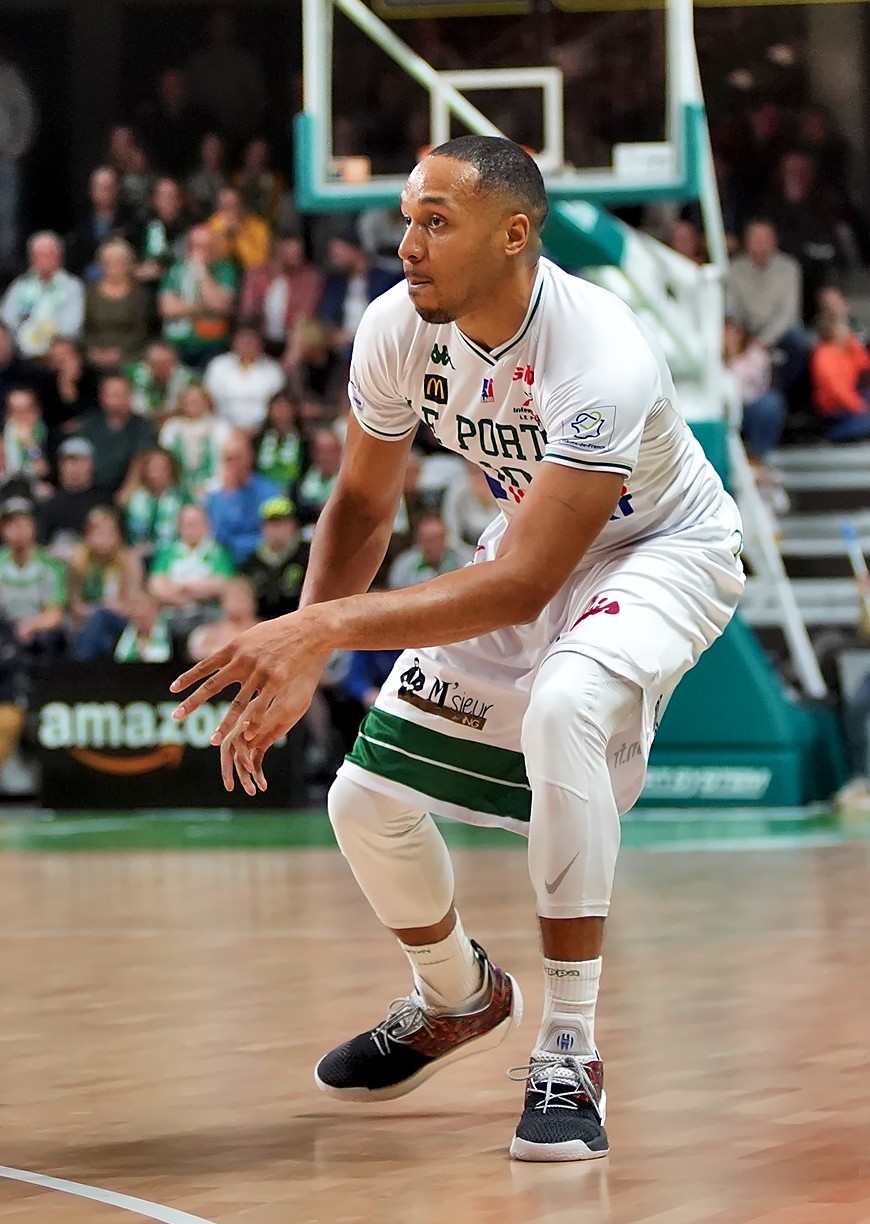
Brandyn Curry holds the record for most awards, with 2

Key
Player (X)	Name of the player and number of times they had won the award at that point (if more than one)
Club (X)	Name of the club and the number of times a player of it has won the award (if more than one)
^	Denotes player who is still active in the DBL

Year	Player	Position	Nationality	Team	Ref.
2005	Joe Spinks	Guard	United States	Amsterdam Astronauts	
2014	Arvin Slagter	Guard	Netherlands	GasTerra Flames	
2015	Brandyn Curry	Guard	United States	SPM Shoeters Den Bosch	
2016	Lance Jeter	Guard	United States	Donar	
2017	Chase Fieler	Forward	United States	Donar	
2018	Brandyn Curry (2)	Guard	United States	Donar	
2019	Kaza Kajami-Keane	Guard	Canada	Landstede Zwolle	
2021	Worthy de Jong^	Guard	Netherlands	ZZ Leiden	

== Awards by player ==
Player	Total
Brandyn Curry	2

== Awards by nationality ==
Player	Total
United States	5
Netherlands	2
Canada	1
