= Chase Fieler =

American basketball player (born 1992)

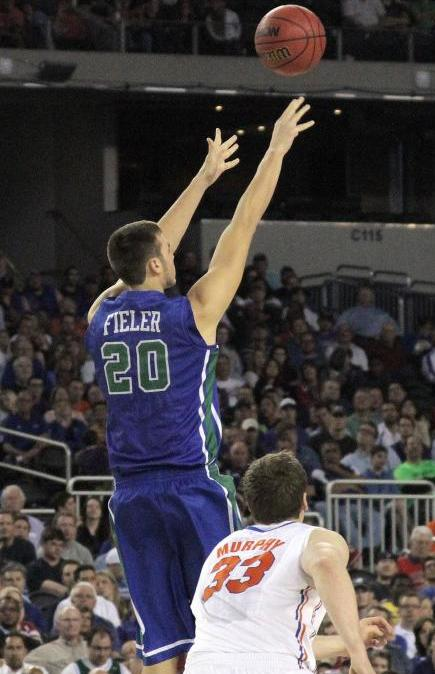
- Fieler with Florida Gulf Coast in 2013

No. 60 – Alvark Tokyo
- Position: Power forward
- League: B.League

Personal information
- Born: June 10, 1992 (age 34) Parkersburg, West Virginia, U.S.
- Listed height: 6 ft 8 in (2.03 m)
- Listed weight: 240 lb (109 kg)

Career information
- High school: Parkersburg South (Parkersburg, West Virginia)
- College: Florida Gulf Coast (2010–2014)
- NBA draft: 2014: undrafted
- Playing career: 2014–present

Career history
- 2014–2015: Ourense
- 2015–2017: Donar
- 2017–2019: Oostende
- 2019–2020: Promitheas Patras
- 2020–2021: Brose Bamberg
- 2021–2022: Utsunomiya Brex
- 2022–2025: Saga Ballooners
- 2025-: Alvark Tokyo

Career highlights
- B.League champion (2022); 2× Belgian League champion (2018, 2019); Belgian League All-Defensive Team (2018); Belgian Cup champion (2018); 2× Dutch League champion (2016, 2017); DBL Play-offs MVP (2017); Dutch Cup champion (2017); Dutch Supercup champion (2016); All-DBL Team (2017); DBL Statistical Player of the Year (2017); DBL blocks leader (2016); Greek League All Star (2020); Second-team All-Atlantic Sun (2014)

Chase Fieler (born June 10, 1992) is an American basketball player for the Alvark Tokyo of the Japanese B.League. Fieler usually plays at the power forward position.

== College career ==
Fieler played for Florida Gulf Coast University from 2010 to 2014. He was a member of the 2012–13 team that became known for its surprise run during the NCAA Tournament. He was known for his alley-oop dunk off of a pass from Brett Comer that became the iconic play of the game.

== Professional career ==
In the 2014–15 season, after not being drafted by an NBA team, Fieler started his career with Club Ourense Baloncesto in the Spanish LEB Oro. He won the Playoffs with Ourense, which earned the club the right to promotion to the first-tier Liga ACB.

For the 2015–16 season, he signed with Donar Groningen in the Netherlands. After winning the championship in 2016, he re-signed with Donar for another season. On November 15, 2016, Fieler set a new FIBA Europe Cup record with an efficiency of 46 in a 98–70 victory against Limburg United. In the 2016–17 season, Fieler was named to the All-DBL Team and was awarded the DBL Statistical Player of the Year Award. Fieler won his second Dutch title with Donar that season and was named the DBL Play-offs MVP after averaging 13.7 points in the play-offs.

On June 21, 2017, Fieler signed a two-year contract with BC Oostende of the Belgian Basketball League. He won the Belgian championship two consecutive years with Oostende, while also playing in the Basketball Champions League.

On June 24, 2019, Fieler signed a deal with Promitheas Patras of the Greek Basket League. He averaged 8.5 points and 2.3 rebounds per game and was selected to play in the HEBA Greek All Star Game.

On July 28, 2020, Fieler signed with Brose Bamberg of the German Basketball Bundesliga. He averaged 9.4 points and 3.2 rebounds in the 2020–21 season.

In July 2021, Fieler signed in Japan with Utsunomiya Brex. He won the 2021–22 B.League championship with Brex.

On June 28, 2022, Fieler signed with fellow Japanese club Saga Ballooners. On June 20, 2023, Fieler re-signed with Saga Ballooners. On May 21, 2024, Fieler re-signed with Saga Ballooners. In December 2024, he has been diagnosed with a rupture of the anterior cruciate ligament in his left knee.

== Honors and titles ==
=== Club ===
Donar

- 2× Dutch Basketball League: 2015–16, 2016–17
- NBB Cup: 2016–17
- Dutch Supercup: 2016

Oostende

- 2× Pro Basketball League: 2017–18, 2018–19
- Belgian Cup: 2017–18

=== Individual ===
- HEBA Greek All Star Game: 2020
- Belgian League All-Defensive Team: 2017–18
- DBL Play-offs MVP: 2017
- All-DBL Team: 2016–17
- DBL Statistical Player of the Year: 2016–17
- DBL blocks leader: 2015–16
- Second-team All-Atlantic Sun: 2014
