= DBL MVP Under 23 =

The Dutch Basketball League (DBL) Most Valuable Player Under 23 is an award that is yearly given to the best player under age 23 in the DBL, the highest professional basketball league in the Netherlands. The award is handed out after the regular season since 2004. The award is handed out by the FEB (Federatie Eredivisie Basketbal).

== Winners ==
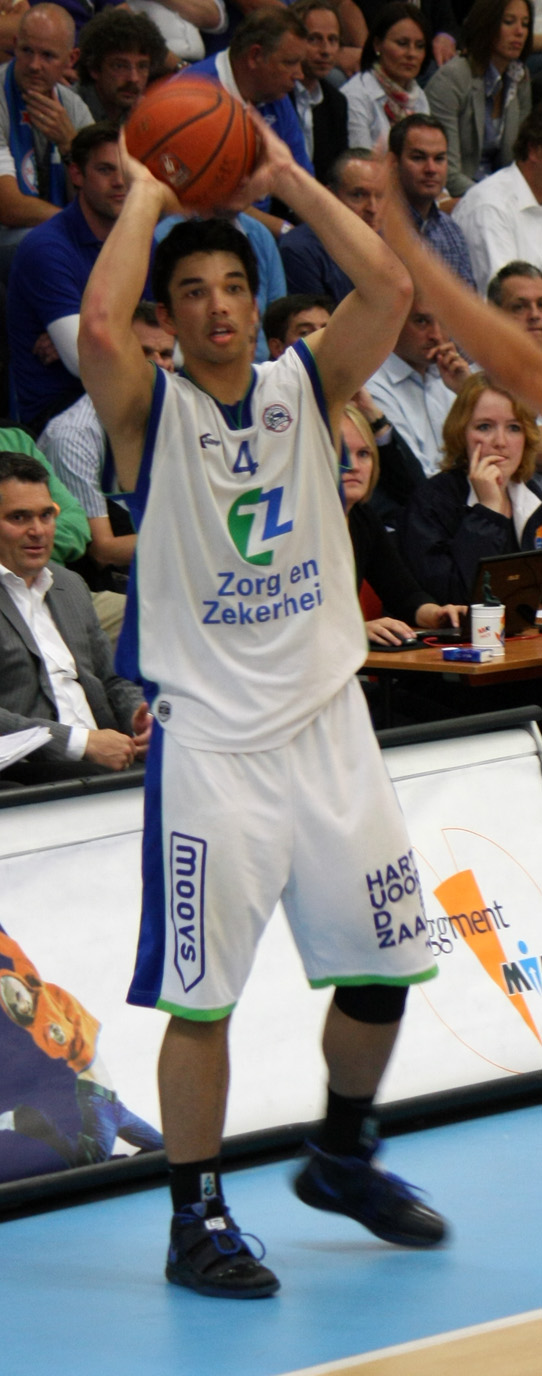
Arvin Slagter won the award in 2006 and 2008.

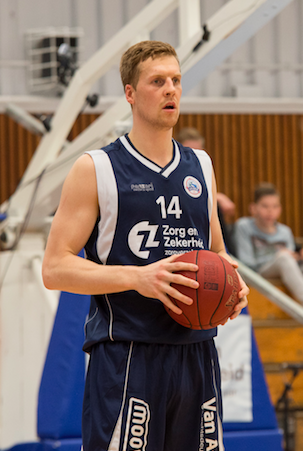
Thomas Koenis won the award in 2009 and 2012.

Key
Player (X)	Name of the player and number of times they had won the award at that point (if more than one)
Club (X)	Name of the club and the number of times a player of it has won the award (if more than one)
^	Denotes player who is still active in the DBL

Season	Player	Position	Nationality	Team	Ref.
2003–04	Kees Akerboom Jr.	Guard	Netherlands	Tulip Den Bosch	
2004–05	Marcel Aarts	Center	Netherlands	EiffelTowers Den Bosch	
2005–06	Arvin Slagter	Guard	Netherlands	Rotterdam Basketbal	
2006–07	Rogier Jansen	Guard	Netherlands	Polynorm Giants	
2007–08	Arvin Slagter (2)	Guard	Netherlands	Polynorm Giants	
2008–09	Thomas Koenis	Center	Netherlands	Den Helder Seals	
2009–10	Jessey Voorn	Guard	Netherlands	ABC Amsterdam	
2010–11	Jessey Voorn (2)	Guard	Netherlands	ABC Amsterdam	
2011–12	Thomas Koenis (2)	Center	Netherlands	GasTerra Flames	
2012–13	Jessey Voorn (3)	Guard	Netherlands	GasTerra Flames	
2013–14	Leon Williams	Guard	Netherlands	Landstede Zwolle	
2014–15	Yannick Franke	Guard	Netherlands	Challenge Sports Rotterdam	
2015–16	Maarten Bouwknecht	Guard	Netherlands	SPM Shoeters Den Bosch	
2016–17	Maarten Bouwknecht (2)	Guard	Netherlands	New Heroes Den Bosch	
2017–18	Boyd van der Vuurst de Vries	Guard	Netherlands	Den Helder Suns	
2018–19	Rienk Mast	Forward	Netherlands	Donar	
2020–21	Boyd van der Vuurst de Vries (2)	Guard	Netherlands	Den Helder Suns	
