= Slovenia men's national under-19 basketball team =

Slovenia
- Joined FIBA: 1992
- FIBA zone: FIBA Europe
- National federation: KZS

U19 World Cup
- Appearances: 3
- Medals: Bronze: 1 (2025)

U18 EuroBasket
- Appearances: 20
- Medals: Gold: 1 (2026); Silver: 1 (2002); Bronze: 2 (2019, 2024)

U18 EuroBasket Division B
- Appearances: 4
- Medals: Gold: 1 (2008); Silver: 1 (2018); Bronze: 1 (2015)
Home	Away

The Slovenia men's national under-18 and under-19 basketball team (Slovene: Slovenska košarkarska reprezentanca do 18 in mlajših od 19 let) is a national basketball team of Slovenia, administered by the Basketball Federation of Slovenia (Košarkarska zveza Slovenije). It represents the country in international under-18 and under-19 men's basketball competitions.

== Competitive record ==
=== FIBA U18 EuroBasket ===
Year	Pos.	Pld	W	L	Ref.
(Hungary) 1992	Did not participate				
(Israel) 1994	7th	7	4	3	
(France) 1996	Did not qualify				
(Bulgaria) 1998	7th	8	4	4	
(Croatia) 2000	9th	7	4	3	
(Germany) 2002	2nd	8	7	1	
(Spain) 2004	Did not qualify				
(Serbia and Montenegro) 2005	10th	8	6	2	
(Greece) 2006	14th	8	2	6	
(Spain) 2007	15th	6	2	4	
(Greece) 2008	(Division B)				
(France) 2009	12th	8	2	6	
(Lithuania) 2010	10th	8	3	5	
(Poland) 2011	12th	8	2	6	
(Lithuania) (Latvia) 2012	10th	8	3	5	
(Latvia) 2013	16th	9	1	8	
(Turkey) 2014	(Division B)				
(Greece) 2015	(Division B)				
(Turkey) 2016	11th	6	2	4	
(Slovakia) 2017	14th	7	2	5	
(Latvia) 2018	(Division B)				
(Greece) 2019	3rd	7	4	3	
(Turkey) 2022	4th	7	4	3	
(Serbia) 2023	8th	7	3	4	
(Finland) 2024	3rd	7	6	1	
(Serbia) 2025	6th	7	4	3	
(Italy) 2026	1st	7	6	1	
Total	20/27	148	71	77	

=== FIBA U18 EuroBasket Division B ===
Year	Pos.	Pld	W	L	Ref.
(Hungary) 2008	1st	8	7	1	
(Bulgaria) 2014	5th	8	5	3	
(Austria) 2015	3rd	9	8	1	
(North Macedonia) 2018	2nd	8	6	2	
Total	4/20	33	26	7	

=== FIBA U19 World Cup ===
Year	Pos.	Pld	W	L	Ref.
(Greece) 1995	Did not qualify				
(Portugal) 1999	Did not qualify				
(Greece) 2003	7th	8	3	5	
(Serbia) 2007	Did not qualify				
(New Zealand) 2009	Did not qualify				
(Latvia) 2011	Did not qualify				
(Czech Republic) 2013	Did not qualify				
(Greece) 2015	Did not qualify				
(Egypt) 2017	Did not qualify				
(Greece) 2019	Did not qualify				
(Latvia) 2021	Did not qualify				
(Hungary) 2023	9th	7	5	2	
(Switzerland) 2025	3rd	7	4	3	
(Czech Republic) 2027	Qualified				
(Indonesia) 2029	To be determined				
Total	3/17	22	12	10	

== See also ==
- Slovenia men's national basketball team
- Slovenia men's national under-20 basketball team
- Slovenia men's national under-16 and under-17 basketball team
- Slovenia women's national under-19 basketball team
