= Maarten Bouwknecht =

Dutch basketball player (born 1994)

No. 2 – Team Amsterdam
- Position: Point guard

Personal information
- Born: 14 December 1994 (age 31) Groningen, Netherlands
- Listed height: 1.85 m (6 ft 1 in)

Career information
- Playing career: 2013–present

Career history
- 2013–2015: Donar
- 2015–2019: Den Bosch
- 2019–2021: Worcester Wolves
- 2021–2024: ZZ Leiden

Career highlights
- BNXT League champion (2022); 3× Dutch League champion (2014, 2023, 2024); 4× Dutch Cup champion (2014–2016, 2023); 3× Dutch Supercup champion (2014, 2015, 2021); 2× DBL MVP Under 23 (2016–2017); DBL Most Improved Player (2017); BBL Cup champion (2020)

Maarten Bouwknecht (born 14 December 1994) is a professional 3x3 basketball player and former 5x5 player. Standing at 1.85 m (6 ft 1 in), he usually plays as point guard or shooting guard. Born in Groningen, he started his career with his hometown team Donar in 2013. He transferred to rivals Den Bosch after two seasons and became a notable force in Dutch basketball. Bouwknecht played two years in the British Basketball League (BBL) with the Worcester Wolves, before signing with ZZ Leiden where he stayed three seasons.

== Career ==
After playing in the youth teams of the club, Bouwknecht signed with the first team of GasTerra Flames (the sponsored name of Donar) in the summer of 2013. He won the Dutch Basketball League (DBL) championship and the NBB Cup in 2014.

On 23 June 2015, he signed a three-year contract with Den Bosch. In the 2015–16 season, Bouwknecht was named the DBL MVP Under 23.

On 20 August 2019, Bouwknecht signed with the Worcester Wolves of the British Basketball League (BBL). With the Wolves, Bouwknecht won the BBL Cup title.

On 4 July 2021, Bouwknecht returned to the Netherlands when he signed a one-year contract with ZZ Leiden. He won the first-ever BNXT League championship with the team. On 14 June 2022, he extended his contract with two more seasons, until 2024.

On 12 March 2023, he won the Dutch Basketball Cup with Leiden after defeating Landstede Hammers in the final. Bouwknecht scored a game-high 19 points in the final. In May, Bouwknecht won his second Dutch national championship.

== 3x3 career ==
In July 2024, Bouwknecht announced he would completely switch to 3x3 basketball and would leave the professional 5x5 game, joining Team Amsterdam. He had won two tournaments earlier with Team Utrecht and Teame Haarlem.

== National team career ==
Bouwknecht made his debut for the Netherlands men's national basketball team on 7 July 2017, under coach Toon van Helfteren in a game against Bulgaria.
