= Javier Duren =

American basketball player (born 1993)

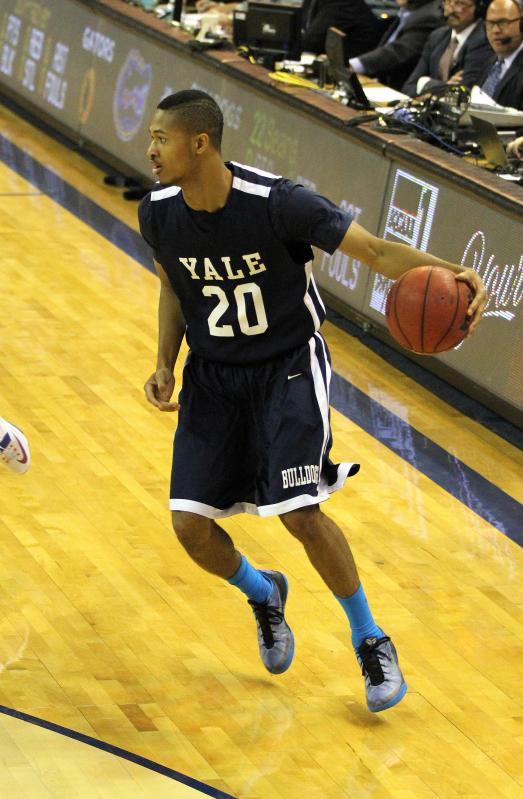
- Duren playing with Yale in 2014

Personal information
- Born: July 1, 1993 (age 33) St. Louis, Missouri, U.S.
- Listed height: 6 ft 4 in (1.93 m)
- Listed weight: 185 lb (84 kg)

Career information
- High school: Oakville (Oakville, Missouri)
- College: Yale (2011–2015)
- NBA draft: 2015: undrafted
- Playing career: 2015–2017
- Position: Point guard

Career history
- 2015–2016: Aris Leeuwarden
- 2016–2017: Kaposvári
- 2017: Nokia

Career highlights
- DBL scoring leader (2016); First-team All-Ivy League (2015)

Javier Duren (born July 1, 1993) is an American former professional basketball player. He played for the Yale Bulldogs from 2011 to 2015. He played the point guard position. Between 2019 and 2024, he worked with the St. Louis Cardinals of Major League Baseball (MLB) in their baseball operations department in various roles including manager of video operations.

== Professional career ==
In July 2015, Duren was announced as the new point guard of Aris Leeuwarden. He had a career-high 37 points against ZZ Leiden on March 29. Duren eventually became the DBL scoring leader, averaging 17.7 points per game in the 2015–16 season.

On August 11, 2016, he signed with Kaposvári KK in Hungary.

On January 30, 2017, Duren signed with BC Nokia of the Finnish Korisliiga.

On October 21, 2017, Duren was drafted by the Lakeland Magic of the NBA G League. On October 31, 2017, Duren was waived by the Magic after appearing in one preseason game.
