= 2008 FIBA Europe Under-18 Championship Division B =

2008 FIBA U18 European Championship
25th FIBA Under-18 European Basketball Championship

Tournament details
- Host country: Hungary
- Dates: July 25 – August 3
- Teams: 20 (from 49 federations)
- Venues: 2 (in 1 host city)

Final positions
- Champions: Slovenia (1st title)

Tournament statistics
- Top scorer: (Slovakia) Richard Grznár 22.0
- Top rebounds: (Romania) Rolland Török 12.8
- Top assists: (Czech Republic) Tomáš Satoranský 6.4
- PPG (Team): Netherlands 87.6
- RPG (Team): Poland 41.1
- APG (Team): Czech Republic 17.5

Official website
- U18 Men 2008 Division B

In 2008, Division B of the FIBA Europe Under-18 Championship basketball tournament was played in Hungary. The Slovenian team finished top of the table.

== Qualifying teams ==
Group A	Group B	Group C	Group D
Austria; Czech Republic; Montenegro; Netherlands; Norway	Bosnia and Herzegovina; Ireland; Slovenia; Sweden; Switzerland	Belarus; England; Poland; Portugal; Romania	Denmark; Finland; Georgia; Hungary; Slovakia

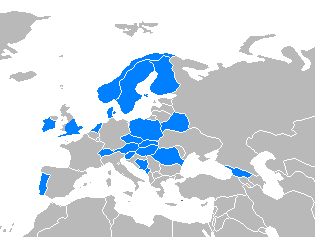

== Squads ==
At the start of tournament, all 20 participating countries will have 12 players on their roster.

== Venues ==
City	Arena	Capacity
Debrecen	Hodos Imre Sports Hall	2,000
Debrecen	Olah Gabor Sports Hall	1500

== Preliminary round ==
Qualified for the qualifying round

=== Group A ===
Team	Pts.	W	L	PCT	PF	PA	Diff
Czech Republic	7	3	1	0.750	364	288	+122
Austria	7	3	1	0.750	311	287	+24
Montenegro	6	2	2	0.500	328	335	-7
Netherlands	5	1	3	0.250	281	304	-23
Norway	4	0	4	0.000	266	336	-70

July 25
13:45

Montenegro	70–66	Norway
Scoring by quarter: 18-22, 23-8, 14-11, 15-25

Olah Gabor Sports Hall, Debrecen

July 25
16:00

Netherlands	82–89	Austria
Scoring by quarter: 17-19, 27-23, 15-26, 23-21

Olah Gabor Sports Hall, Debrecen

July 26
18:15

Czech Republic	107–71	Netherlands
Scoring by quarter: 33-23, 27-21, 24-15, 23-12

Hodos Imre Sports Hall, Debrecen

July 26
20:30

Austria	71–65	Montenegro
Scoring by quarter: 22-23, 16-19, 21-12, 12-11

Hodos Imre Sports Hall, Debrecen

July 27
16:00

Norway	63–78	Austria
Scoring by quarter: 19-20, 19-16, 9-25, 16-17

Olah Gabor Sports Hall, Debrecen

July 27
20:30

Montenegro	81–79	Czech Republic
Scoring by quarter: 19-24, 20-16, 17-25, 22-17

Olah Gabor Sports Hall, Debrecen

July 28
18:15

Czech Republic	101–63	Norway
Scoring by quarter: 20-8, 29-18, 22-20, 29-17

Hodos Imre Sports Hall, Debrecen

July 28
20:30

Netherlands	88–65	Montenegro
Scoring by quarter: 14-17, 29-18, 17-16, 28-14

Hodos Imre Sports Hall, Debrecen

July 29
13:45

Austria	73–77	Czech Republic
Scoring by quarter: 22-15, 8-23, 24-18, 19-21

Olah Gabor Sports Hall, Debrecen

July 29
16:00

Norway	74–87	Netherlands
Scoring by quarter: 11-21, 20-20, 24-24, 19-21

Olah Gabor Sports Hall, Debrecen

=== Group B ===
Team	Pts.	W	L	PCT	PF	PA	Diff
Slovenia	6	3	0	1.000	171	119	+52
Sweden	5	2	1	0.667	246	213	+33
Switzerland	5	2	2	0.500	271	302	-31
Bosnia and Herzegovina	4	2	2	0.000	208	219	-11
Ireland	2	0	2	0.000	138	151	-13

July 25
18:15

Sweden	74–66	Bosnia and Herzegovina
Scoring by quarter: 18-16, 22-15, 17-11, 17-18

Olah Gabor Sports Hall, Debrecen

July 25
20:30

Switzerland	72–68	Ireland
Scoring by quarter: 17-23, 11-16, 21-17, 23-12

Olah Gabor Sports Hall, Debrecen

July 26
13:45

Slovenia	85–63	Sweden
Scoring by quarter: 18-9, 24-18, 22-15, 19-21

Hodos Imre Sports Hall, Debrecen

July 26
16:00

Bosnia and Herzegovina	69–75	Switzerland
Scoring by quarter: 18-28, 11-7, 20-14, 20-26

Hodos Imre Sports Hall, Debrecen

July 27
13:45

Ireland	70–79	Bosnia and Herzegovina
Scoring by quarter: 19-16, 19-21, 13-24, 19-18

Olah Gabor Sports Hall, Debrecen

July 27
18:15

Switzerland	56–86	Slovenia
Scoring by quarter: 12-21, 21-31, 8-20, 15-15

Olah Gabor Sports Hall, Debrecen

July 28
13:45

Sweden	79–68	Switzerland
Scoring by quarter: 23-12, 13-10, 16-26, 27-20

Hodos Imre Sports Hall, Debrecen

July 28
16:00

Slovenia	94–42	Ireland
Scoring by quarter: 21-4, 18-12, 31-10, 24-16

Hodos Imre Sports Hall, Debrecen

July 29
18:15

Bosnia and Herzegovina	87–63	Slovenia
Scoring by quarter: 21-18, 23-17, 14-11, 29-17

Olah Gabor Sports Hall, Debrecen

July 29
20:30

Ireland	56–63	Sweden
Scoring by quarter: 13-14, 14-15, 14-14, 15-20

Olah Gabor Sports Hall, Debrecen

=== Group C ===
Team	Pts.	W	L	PCT	PF	PA	Diff
Poland	6	3	0	1.000	263	178	+85
Portugal	3	1	1	0.500	175	149	+26
England	3	1	1	0.500	163	157	+6
Romania	3	1	1	0.500	116	141	-25
Belarus	3	0	3	0.000	179	271	-92

July 25
13:45

England	81–88	Poland
Scoring by quarter: 15-31, 24-14, 20-16, 22-27

Hodos Imre Sports Hall, Debrecen

July 25
20:30

Belarus	62–69	Romania
Scoring by quarter: 19-15, 21-15, 18-19, 4-20

Hodos Imre Sports Hall, Debrecen

July 26
16:00

Portugal	69–82	England

Olah Gabor Sports Hall, Debrecen

July 26
18:15

Poland	96–50	Belarus

Olah Gabor Sports Hall, Debrecen

July 27
13:45

Belarus	67–106	Portugal

Hodos Imre Sports Hall, Debrecen

July 27
20:30

Romania	47–79	Poland

Hodos Imre Sports Hall, Debrecen

July 28
16:00

Portugal	88–63	Romania

Olah Gabor Sports Hall, Debrecen

July 28
20:30

England	67–72	Belarus

Olah Gabor Sports Hall, Debrecen

July 29
13:45

Poland	vs.	Portugal

Hodos Imre Sports Hall, Debrecen

July 29
16:00

Romania	vs.	England

Hodos Imre Sports Hall, Debrecen

=== Group D ===
Team	Pts.	W	L	PCT	PF	PA	Diff
Slovakia	7	3	1	0.500	349	318	+31
Denmark	6	2	2	1.000	277	304	-27
Finland	6	2	2	0.500	295	264	+31
Georgia	6	2	2	0.000	285	307	-22
Hungary	5	1	3	0.000	301	314	-13

July 25
16:00

Denmark	67–98	Slovakia
Scoring by quarter: 16-32, 19-18, 23-22, 9-26

Hodos Imre Sports Hall, Debrecen

July 25
18:15

Hungary	70–82	Finland
Scoring by quarter: 17-11, 14-30, 17-18, 22-23

Hodos Imre Sports Hall, Debrecen

July 26
13:45

Finland	55–65	Denmark
Scoring by quarter: 15-17, 14-15, 13-12, 13-21

Olah Gabor Sports Hall, Debrecen

July 26
20:30

Georgia	73–63	Hungary
Scoring by quarter: 16-21, 25-11, 21-18, 11-13

Olah Gabor Sports Hall, Debrecen

July 27
16:00

Denmark	81–75	Georgia
Scoring by quarter: 24-19, 16-12, 14-12, 27-32

Hodos Imre Sports Hall, Debrecen

July 27
18:15

Slovakia	77–74	Finland
Scoring by quarter: 18-29, 15-15, 23-18, 21-12

Hodos Imre Sports Hall, Debrecen

July 28
13:45

Georgia	85–79	Slovakia
Scoring by quarter: 16-28, 27-15, 19-17, 23-19

Olah Gabor Sports Hall, Debrecen

July 28
18:15

Hungary	76–67	Denmark
Scoring by quarter: 26-12, 15-20, 8-19, 27-13

Olah Gabor Sports Hall, Debrecen

July 29
18:15

Slovakia	95–92	Hungary
Scoring by quarter: 26-26, 25-16, 25-22, 19-28

Hodos Imre Sports Hall, Debrecen

July 29
20:30

Finland	84–52	Georgia
Scoring by quarter: 24-14, 17-10, 18-16, 25-12

Hodos Imre Sports Hall, Debrecen

== Qualifying round ==
Qualified for the quarterfinals

=== Group E ===
Team	Pts.	W	L	PCT
A1				
A2				
B1				
B2				

August 6
16:30

Czech Republic	vs.	Sweden

Madrid Arena, Madrid

August 6
19:00

Austria	vs.	Slovenia

Madrid Arena, Madrid

August 7
21:30

Czech Republic	vs.	Slovenia

Madrid Arena, Madrid

August 7
16:30

Austria	vs.	Sweden

Madrid Arena, Madrid

=== Group F ===
Team	Pts.	W	L	PCT
C1				
C2				
D1				
D2				

August 6
16:30

Poland	vs.	Denmark

Madrid Arena, Madrid

August 6
19:00

Portugal	vs.	Slovakia

Madrid Arena, Madrid

August 7
21:30

Poland	vs.	Slovakia

Madrid Arena, Madrid

August 7
16:30

Portugal	vs.	Denmark

Madrid Arena, Madrid

=== Group G ===
Team	Pts.	W	L	PCT
Netherlands	2	1	0	
Switzerland	2	1	0	
Bosnia and Herzegovina	1	0	0	
Montenegro	1	0	0	

August 6
16:30

Montenegro	vs.	Switzerland

Madrid Arena, Madrid

August 6
19:00

Netherlands	vs.	Bosnia and Herzegovina

Madrid Arena, Madrid

August 7
21:30

Switzerland	vs.	Netherlands

Madrid Arena, Madrid

August 7
16:30

Bosnia and Herzegovina	vs.	Montenegro

Madrid Arena, Madrid

=== Group H ===
Team	Pts.	W	L	PCT
C3				
C4				
D3				
D4				

August 6
16:30

C3	vs.	D4

Madrid Arena, Madrid

August 6
19:00

D3	vs.	C4

Madrid Arena, Madrid

August 7
21:30

D3	vs.	C3

Madrid Arena, Madrid

August 7
16:30

D4	vs.	C4

Madrid Arena, Madrid

== Knockout stage ==
=== 1st place bracket ===
Semi-finals
August 9
Slovenia	81
Slovakia	53
August 9
Poland	47
Czech Republic	71

Final
August 10
Slovenia	68
Czech Republic	60
Third place
August 10
Slovakia	60
Poland	70

=== 5th place bracket ===
Semi-finals
August 9
Portugal	68
Sweden	86
August 9
Austria	82
Denmark	75

Fifth place
August 10
Sweden	67
Austria	80
Seventh place
August 10
Portugal	69
Denmark	56

=== 9th place bracket ===
Semi-finals
August 9
Netherlands	104
Romania	71
August 9
Finland	70
Montenegro	87

9th Place
August 10
Netherlands	78
Montenegro	74
11th Place
August 10
Romania	58
Finland	64

=== 13th place bracket ===
Semi-finals
August 9
Switzerland	81
Belarus	89
August 9
Georgia	84
Bosnia and Herzegovina	78

13th Place
August 10
Belarus	66
Georgia	86
15th Place
August 10
Switzerland	72
Bosnia and Herzegovina	80

=== Semifinals ===
August 9

E1	vs.	F2

Palacio de Deportes de la Comunidad de Madrid, Madrid

August 9

F1	vs.	E2

Palacio de Deportes de la Comunidad de Madrid, Madrid

=== Classification round for 5th to 8th place ===
August 9

E3	vs.	F4

Palacio de Deportes de la Comunidad de Madrid, Madrid

August 9

F3	vs.	E4

Palacio de Deportes de la Comunidad de Madrid, Madrid

=== Classification round for 9th to 12th place ===
August 9

G1	vs.	H2

Palacio de Deportes de la Comunidad de Madrid, Madrid

August 9

H1	vs.	G2

Palacio de Deportes de la Comunidad de Madrid, Madrid

=== Classification round for 13th to 16th place ===
August 9

G3	vs.	H4

Palacio de Deportes de la Comunidad de Madrid, Madrid

August 9

H3	vs.	G4

Palacio de Deportes de la Comunidad de Madrid, Madrid

=== Final ===
August 3
20:30

Boxscore

Slovenia	68–60	Czech Republic
Scoring by quarter: 14–16, 22–17, 20–8, 12–19

Oláh Gábor Sports Hall, Debrecen
Attendance: 2 000
Referees: Milivoje Jovcic (SRB), Jaroslav Janac (SVK), Sérgio Silva (POR)

=== Classification Game for 3rd to 4th place ===
August 10

Loser of (62)	vs.	Loser of (63)

Palacio de Deportes de la Comunidad de Madrid, Madrid

=== Classification Game for 5th to 6th place ===
August 10

winner of (60)	vs.	winner of (61)

Palacio de Deportes de la Comunidad de Madrid, Madrid

=== Classification Game for 7th to 8th place ===
August 10

Loser of (60)	vs.	Loser of (61)

Palacio de Deportes de la Comunidad de Madrid, Madrid

=== Classification Game for 9th to 10th place ===
August 10

winner of (58)	vs.	winner of (59)

Palacio de Deportes de la Comunidad de Madrid, Madrid

=== Classification Game for 11th to 12th place ===
August 10

Loser of (58)	vs.	Loser of (59)

Palacio de Deportes de la Comunidad de Madrid, Madrid

=== Classification Game for 13th to 14th place ===
August 10

winner of (56)	vs.	winner of (57)

Palacio de Deportes de la Comunidad de Madrid, Madrid

=== Classification Game for 15th to 16th place ===
August 10

looser of (56)	vs.	looser of (57)

Palacio de Deportes de la Comunidad de Madrid, Madrid

=== Classification round for 17th to 20th place ===
==== Group I ====
Team	Pts.	W	L	PCT	PF	PA	Diff
Norway							
Ireland							
England							
Hungary							

July 31
21:30

Ireland	61–83	England
Scoring by quarter: 17-18, 13-19, 13-27, 18-19

Madrid Arena, Debrecen

July 31
16:30

Norway	74–87 (OT)	Hungary
Scoring by quarter: 11-20, 16-11, 22-17, 18-19, Overtime: 7-20

Madrid Arena, Debrecen

August 1
16:30

England	84–71	Norway
Scoring by quarter: 23-11, 17-14, 19-21, 25-25

Madrid Arena, Debrecen

August 1
16:30

Hungary	106–60	Ireland
Scoring by quarter: 18-12, 25-7, 29-23, 34-18

Madrid Arena, Debrecen

August 2
21:30

Norway	70–60	Ireland
Scoring by quarter: 19-17, 21-17, 24-11, 13-15

Madrid Arena, Debrecen

August 2
16:30

England	vs.	Hungary

Madrid Arena, Debrecen

== Final standings ==
Place	Team
1	Slovenia
2	Czech Republic
3	Poland
4	Slovakia
5	Austria
6	Sweden
7	Portugal
8	Denmark
9	Netherlands
10	Finland
11	Montenegro
12	Romania
13	Georgia
14	Bosnia and Herzegovina
15	Belarus
16	Switzerland
17	Hungary
18	England
19	Norway
20	Ireland
