= Marek Doležaj =

Slovak basketball player

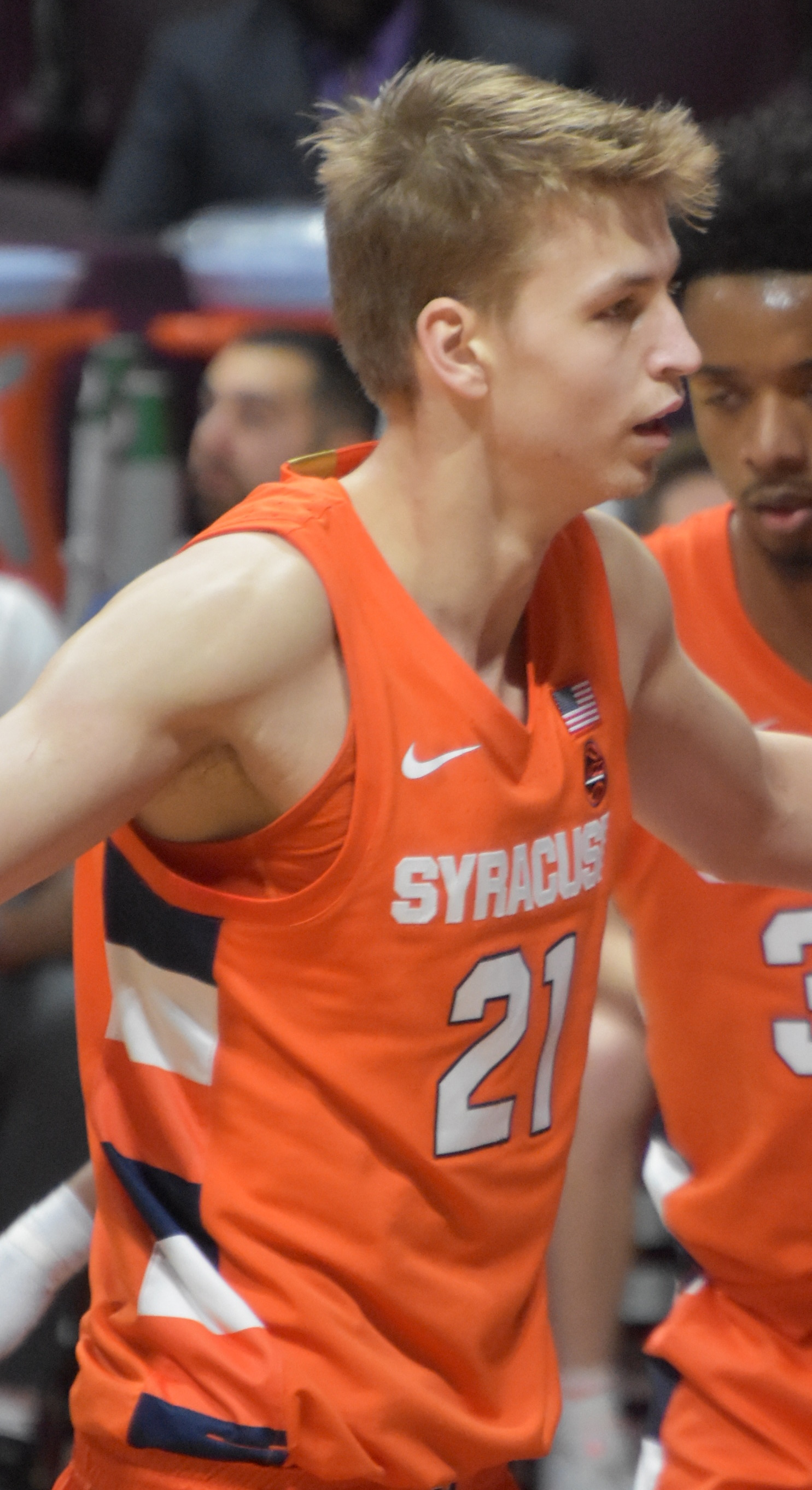
- Doležaj in 2020

SAE Scientifica Legnano
- Position: Power forward
- League: Serie B Basket

Personal information
- Born: 13 April 1998 (age 28) Bratislava, Slovakia
- Listed height: 6 ft 10 in (2.08 m)
- Listed weight: 200 lb (91 kg)

Career information
- High school: Gymnázium Hubeného (Bratislava, Slovakia)
- College: Syracuse (2017–2021)
- Playing career: 2014–present

Career history
- 2014–2015: MBK Karlovka Bratislava
- 2015–2016: Club Baloncesto El Olivar
- 2016–2017: MBK Karlovka Bratislava
- 2021–2022: Ternopil
- 2022: Iraklis Thessaloniki
- 2023: WWU Baskets Münster
- 2023–2025: Keflavík
- 2025–2026: Ármann
- 2026–present: SAE Scientifica Legnano

Career highlights
- Icelandic Cup (2024); Icelandic Super Cup (2024)

Marek Doležaj (born 13 April 1998) is a Slovak professional basketball player who plays for SAE Scientifica Legnano in the Italian Serie B Basket. He played college basketball for the Syracuse Orange. In 2024, he won the Icelandic Basketball Cup as a member of Keflavík.

== Early life ==
Doležaj was born in Bratislava, the son of Miloš Doležaj, a banker, and Ladislava, a professor. His older sister played volleyball. Doležaj grew up playing soccer but first began playing basketball at the age of seven after a coach suggested it. He studied at the Gymnázium Hubeného in Bratislava.

== Basketball ==
=== Early career ===
Doležaj joined MBK Karlovka Bratislava of the Extraliga in 2014, and averaged 2.1 points and 1.1 rebounds per game. He signed with Club Baloncesto El Olivar of the Spanish LEB Plata in October 2015. He put videos of himself playing basketball on YouTube, which attracted the attention of Syracuse assistant coach Adrian Autry. Autry eventually came to Bratislava to recruit Doležaj.

During the 2016-17 season, he played for MBK Karlovka Bratislava and averaged 11.7 points and 4.2 rebounds per game. In May 2017, he committed to play college basketball at Syracuse after talking to his best friend Jack, who grew up in Upstate, NY.

=== College career ===
As a freshman, Doležaj started the final 17 games of the season and averaged 5.8 points and 4.8 rebounds per game, helping the team reach the NCAA Tournament's Sweet 16. He averaged 4.1 points and 3.5 rebounds per game as a sophomore, starting six games. On February 1, 2020, Dolezaj scored a career-high 22 points in a 97-88 loss to Duke. As a junior, he averaged 10.4 points and 6.4 rebounds per game.

Doležaj was slowed by a broken finger as a senior. He chipped his tooth in a game against Georgetown on January 9, 2021. Doležaj averaged 9.8 points, 5.1 rebounds, and 3.3 assists per game, helping the Orange advance to the NCAA tournament's Sweet 16. He finished his career with 960 points and 649 rebounds. Doležaj declined to accept the NCAA's additional year of eligibility granted due to the COVID-19 pandemic, instead pursuing a professional career.

=== Professional career ===
On August 17, 2021, Doležaj signed with BC Ternopil of the Ukrainian Basketball SuperLeague. He averaged 9.8 points, 3.5 rebounds, 1.9 assists and 1.1 steals per game.

On January 13, 2022, Doležaj signed with Iraklis of the Greek Basket League. In 13 games, he averaged 4 points and 3.7 rebounds in 23 minutes per contest.

In July 2023, Doležaj signed with Keflavík of the Icelandic Úrvalsdeild karla. On 23 March 2024, he won the Icelandic Basketball Cup with Keflavík. On 28 September 2024, he won the Icelandic Super Cup after Keflavík defeated reigning national champions Valur 98–88 in the cup final.

In June 2025, he signed with freshly promoted Ármann. For the season he averaged 11.2 points and 6.5 rebounds, helping Ármann avoid relegation. In July 2026 he signed with SAE Scientifica Legnano in the Italian Serie B Basket.

== National team career ==
Doležaj has represented Slovakia in several international competitions. He participated in the 2015 FIBA Europe Under-18 Championship Division B, averaging 9.1 points, 9 rebounds and 4 assists per game despite being younger than most players. Doležaj posted a triple double of 11 points, 12 rebounds and 10 assists against Ireland. In the 2016 FIBA U18 European Championship Division B, he led the team in scoring and rebounding with 13.4 points, 9.4 rebounds and 1.9 assists per game. Doležaj averaged 11 points, 6.4 rebounds, and 2.4 assists in the 2018 FIBA U20 European Championship Division B qualifiers.
