= 2000 FIBA Europe Under-18 Championship =

International basketball competition

2000 EuroBasket Under-18
19th FIBA Europe Under-18 Championship

Tournament details
- Host country: Croatia
- Teams: 12

Final positions
- Champions: France (2nd title)

Tournament statistics
- MVP: (France) Tony Parker
- Top scorer: (Latvia) Šķēle (16.6) (Croatia) Planinic (16.6)
- Top rebounds: (Latvia) Cipruss (9.5)
- Top assists: (Croatia) Popovic (5.1)
- PPG (Team): Yugoslavia (80.9)
- RPG (Team): Lithuania (31.5)
- APG (Team): Greece (13.1)

The 2000 FIBA Europe Under-18 Championship was an international basketball competition held in Croatia in 2000.

== Final ranking ==
1. France

2. Croatia

3. Greece

4. Italy

5. Yugoslavia

6. Russia

7. Lithuania

8. Latvia

9. Slovenia

10. Israel

11. Spain

12. Bulgaria

== Awards ==
Winners
France

=== All-Star Five ===
- (France) Tony Parker
- (Slovenia) Beno Udrih
- (Croatia) Zoran Planinić
- (Russia) Victor Khryapa
- (Federal Republic of Yugoslavia) Blagota Sekulić

=== MVP ===
- (France) Tony Parker
