= Boyd van der Vuurst de Vries =

Dutch basketball player

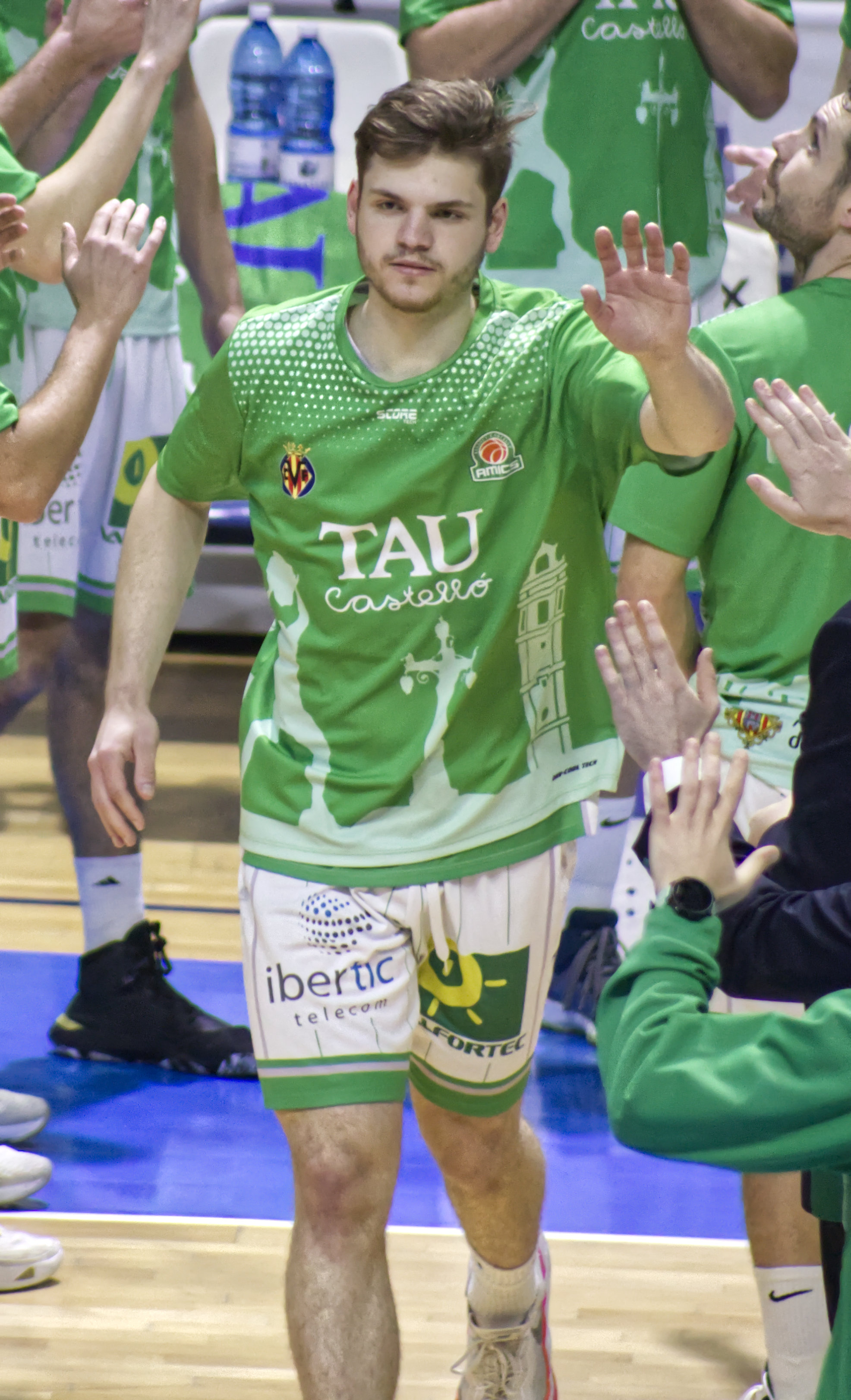
- Van der Vuurst de Vries in 2022

No. 13 – Landstede Hammers
- Position: Point guard / shooting guard
- League: BNXT League

Personal information
- Born: 16 August 1999 (age 27) Delft, Netherlands
- Listed height: 1.90 m (6 ft 3 in)

Career information
- Playing career: 2017–present

Career history
- 2017–2021: Den Helder Suns
- 2021: Okapi Aalst
- 2021–2022: Castelló
- 2022–present: Landstede Hammers

Career highlights
- Dutch Supercup champion (2026); Dutch League champion (2026); 2× DBL MVP Under 23 (2018, 2021); DBL Rookie of the Year (2018); DBL All-Rookie Team (2018)

Boyd Kjeld van der Vuurst de Vries (born 16 August 1999) is a Dutch professional basketball player, who currently plays for Landstede Hammers of the BNXT League.

== Professional career ==
Van der Vuurst de Vries made his debut in the Dutch Basketball League (DBL) in the 2017–18 season with newcomer Den Helder Suns. In his rookie season, he won the DBL MVP Under 23 award for the best league's player under age 23. Additionally, he was also named DBL Rookie of the Year of the season. After the 2020–21 season, he won the DBL MVP Under 23 a second time after a season in which he led the Suns in scoring with 14.7 points per game.

On 10 August 2021, Van der Vuurst de Vries signed with Belgian club Okapi Aalst. On 22 December, he signed with AB Castelló of the LEB Oro.

On 13 June 2022, he signed with Landstede Hammers.

== International career ==
Van der Vuurst de Vries played for the U18 and U16 Netherlands national basketball team. On 12 November 2022, he made his senior debut for the Netherlands senior team in a 77–96 home loss to Ukraine.

== Personal ==
Boyd is the older brother of Keye, who plays professionally for Club Joventut Badalona.
