= 1998 FIBA Europe Under-18 Championship =

Basketball competition

1998 EuroBasket Under-18
18th FIBA Europe Under-18 Championship

Tournament details
- Host country: Bulgaria
- Teams: 12

Final positions
- Champions: Spain (1st title)

Tournament statistics
- Top scorer: (Slovenia) S. Becirovic (28.1)
- Top rebounds: (Croatia) A. Zizic (12.0)
- Top assists: (Slovenia) S. Becirovic (3.8)
- PPG (Team): Greece (91.8)
- RPG (Team): Spain (35.4)
- APG (Team): Greece (11.9)

The 1998 FIBA Europe Under-18 Championship was an international basketball competition held in Bulgaria in 1998.

== Final ranking ==
1. Spain

2. Croatia

3. Greece

4. Latvia

5. Russia

6. Israel

7. Slovenia

8. Bulgaria

9. Lithuania

10. France

11. Turkey

12. Italy

== Awards ==
Winners
Spain
