= Matt Treacy =

Irish historian and writer

Matt Treacy is an Irish historian and writer. Treacy was a member of the Provisional IRA, and spent four years in Portlaoise Prison before being released under the Good Friday Agreement. He worked with a number of Sinn Féin politicians as an advisor and speechwriter, including Martin Ferris TD. Treacy studied and completed a PhD in Trinity College Dublin. Treacy has written histories of the IRA and the Communist Party of Ireland. Treacy contributed a column to An Phoblacht, reporting on Gaelic football and hurling, and works as a freelance journalist.

== Publications ==
- The Communist Party of Ireland 1921 - 2011, by Matt Treacy, Brocaire Books, 2012.
- A Tunnel to the Moon: The End of the Irish Republican Army, by Matt Treacy, Lulu Publishing, 2011.
- The IRA 1956–69: Rethinking the Republic, by Matt Treacy, Manchester University Press, 2013.
- A Year of the Dubs, by Matt Treacy, Lulu Publishing, 2013.
- Houses of Pain, by Matt Treacy, MTP Publishing, 2020.
