= 2015–16 Dutch Basketball League =

Dutch Basketball League
- Season: 2015–16
- Duration: October 6, 2015 – May 27, 2016
- Games played: 6 October 2,016 – 4 April 2,017 (Regular season); 21 April – 27 May 2,017 (Playoffs)
- Teams: 8
- TV partner(s): Ziggo Sport

Regular season
- Top seed: Landstede
- Season MVP: (Netherlands) Worthy de Jong

Finals
- Champions: Donar; 5th title
- Runners-up: Landstede
- Playoffs MVP: (United States) Lance Jeter

Statistical leaders
Points	(United States) Javier Duren	17.7
Rebounds	(Canada) Ross Bekkering	10.5
Assists	(Netherlands) Nigel Van Oostrum	8.1
Index Rating	(Canada) Ross Bekkering	21.3

The 2015–16 Dutch Basketball League season was the 56th season of the Dutch Basketball League, the highest professional basketball league in the Netherlands. The seasons started on October 6, 2015 and ended May 27, 2016. The defending champion was SPM Shoeters Den Bosch. Donar won its fifth national title, after beating Landstede 1–4 in the Final.

== Import players ==
Each team was allowed to play with a maximum of four foreign players, according to DBL regulations.

Team	Players			
Aris Leeuwarden	(United States) Javier Duren	(United States) Joe O'Shea	(United States) Josiah Heath	(United Kingdom) Ali Fraser
Apollo Amsterdam				
Donar	(United States) Lance Jeter	(United States) Chase Fieler	(Croatia) Dražen Bubnić	(United States) Will Sullivan
SPM Shoeters Den Bosch	(Serbia) Dejan Kravić			
Challenge Sports Rotterdam	(United States) La'Shard Anderson	(Suriname) Sergio De Randamie		
Zorg en Zekerheid Leiden	(United States) Cashmere Wright	(United States) Marquise Simmons		
Landstede Basketbal	(United States) Ricardo Glenn	(Canada) Tyson Hinz	(United States) Grant Gibbs	(United States) Steve McWhorter
BSW	(Belgium) Thomas Dreesen			

== Teams ==
Location of teams in 2015–16 Dutch Basketball League

On June 18, 2015, it was announced that all teams from the 2014–15 season would return.

Club	Location	Venue	Capacity
Apollo Amsterdam	Amsterdam	Apollohal	1,500
Donar	Groningen	MartiniPlaza	4,350
SPM Shoeters Den Bosch	's-Hertogenbosch	Maaspoort Sports and Events	2,800
BSW	Weert	Sporthal Boshoven	Unknown
Landstede	Zwolle	Landstede Sportcentrum	1,200
Zorg en Zekerheid Leiden	Leiden	Vijf Meihal	2,000
Aris Leeuwarden	Leeuwarden	Kalverdijkje	1,700
Challenge Sports Rotterdam	Rotterdam	Topsportcentrum	1,000

=== Personnel and kits ===
Team	Coach	Kit manufacturer	Shirt sponsor
Apollo Amsterdam	(Netherlands) Patrick Faijdherbe	Peak	–
Aris Leeuwarden	(Netherlands) Michael Schuurs	Jako	Univé
BSW	(Belgium) Pascal Meurs	Spalding	–
Challenge Sports Rotterdam	(Netherlands) Armand Salomon	Peak	Challenge Sports
Donar	(Netherlands) Erik Braal	Burned	Mini
Landstede	(Netherlands) Herman van den Belt	Hummel	Landstede
SPM Shoeters Den Bosch	(Netherlands) Sam Jones	Joma	SPM Shoes & Boots
Zorg en Zekerheid Leiden	(Belgium) Eddy Casteels	Panzeri Sport	Zorg & Zekerheid

1. Note Schuurs: Klaas Stoppels took over from Schuurs in February 2016, after Schuurs had medical reasons to sit down the rest of the season.

=== Managerial changes ===
Team	Outgoing manager	Manner of departure	Date of vacancy	Position in table	Incoming manager	Date of appointment
Aris Leeuwarden	(Netherlands) Tom Simpson	End of contract	–	Pre-season	(Netherlands) Michael Schuurs	23 May 2015
Donar	(Croatia) Ivica Skelin	End of contract	–	Pre-season	(Netherlands) Erik Braal	21 June 2015
BC Apollo Amsterdam	(Estonia) Jaanus Liivak	End of contract	–	Pre-season	(Netherlands) Patrick Faijdherbe	9 June 2015
BSW	(Netherlands) Niels Vorenhout	End of contract	–	Pre-season	(Belgium) Pascal Meurs	17 July 2015
Aris Leeuwarden	(Netherlands) Michael Schuurs	Health issues	26 February 2016	6th	(Netherlands) Klaas Stoppels	26 February 2016

== Regular season ==
=== Standings ===
Pos	Team	Pld	W	L	PF	PA	PD	Pts	Qualification
1	Landstede	28	22	6	2202	1909	+293	44	Qualification to semi-finals
2	ZZ Leiden	28	22	6	2150	1844	+306	44	Qualification to semi-finals
3	Donar	28	21	7	2316	1917	+399	42	Qualification to quarter-finals
4	SPM Shoeters Den Bosch	28	16	12	2128	2003	+125	32	Qualification to quarter-finals
5	Apollo Amsterdam	28	10	18	1938	2102	−164	20	Qualification to quarter-finals
6	Challenge Sports Rotterdam	28	9	19	2039	2201	−162	18	Qualification to quarter-finals
7	Aris Leeuwarden	28	9	19	2023	2290	−267	18	
8	BSW	28	3	25	1864	2394	−530	6	

Source: Dutch Basketball League, Scoresway

== Playoffs ==
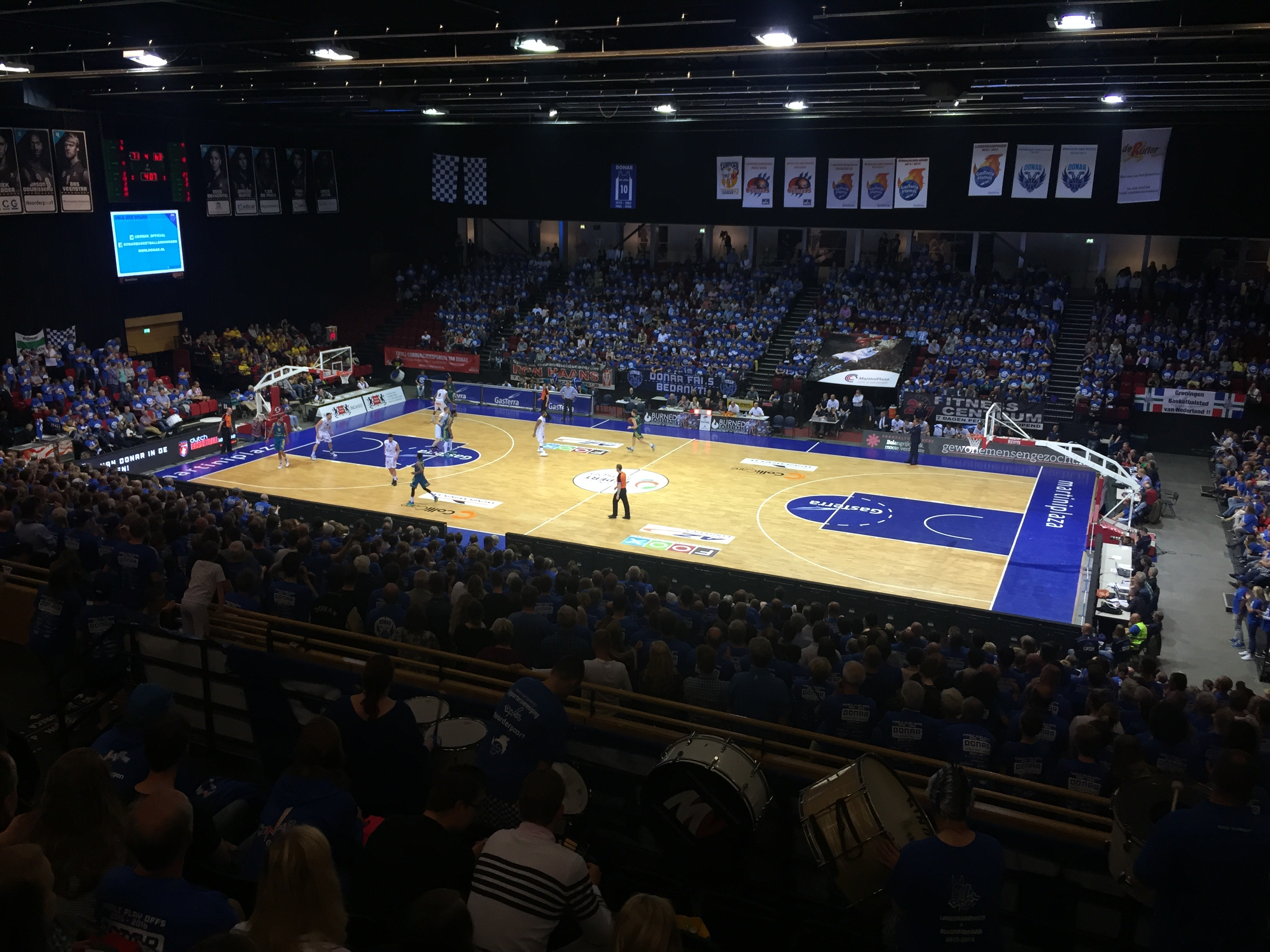
Scene of a Finals game in MartiniPlaza, Groningen

Quarterfinals; 21–23 April
4	SPM Shoeters Den Bosch	2
5	Apollo Amsterdam	0
3	Donar	2
6	Challenge Sports Rotterdam	0

Semifinals; 30 April–12 May
1	Landstede	4
4	SPM Shoeters Den Bosch	2
2	ZZ Leiden	2
3	Donar	4

Finals; 17–27 May
1	Landstede	1
3	Donar	4

== Final standings ==
Pos	Team	Pld	W	L	Qualification
1	Donar (C, O)	42	31	11	Qualification to Champions League qualifying rounds
2	Landstede	39	27	12	
3	ZZ Leiden	34	24	10	
4	SPM Shoeters Den Bosch	34	18	16	
5	Apollo Amsterdam	30	10	20	
6	Challenge Sports Rotterdam	30	9	21	
7	Aris Leeuwarden	28	9	19	
8	BSW	28	3	25	

Source: DBL
(C) Champions; (O) Play-off winners

== Awards ==
The award winners were announced on April 16.

Player and team awards for the 2015–16 season
Most Valuable Player
- (Netherlands) Worthy de Jong − ZZ Leiden
  - (Canada) Ross Bekkering − Donar
    - (United States) Grant Gibbs − Landstede Basketbal
Playoffs MVP
- (United States) Lance Jeter − Donar
Defensive Player of the Year
- (Netherlands) Mohamed Kherrazi − ZZ Leiden
Coach of the Year
- (Netherlands) Herman van den Belt − Landstede Basketbal
DBL MVP Under 23
- (Netherlands) Maarten Bouwknecht − SPM Shoeters Den Bosch
Statistical Player of the Year
- (Canada) Ross Bekkering − Donar
Sixth Man of the Year
- (Netherlands) Rogier Jansen − ZZ Leiden
Rookie of the Year
- (Netherlands) Freek Vos − Landstede Basketbal
Most Improved Player
- (United States) Grant Gibbs − Landstede Basketbal

== Statistical leaders ==
To be included a player had to have played at least 70% of his teams number of games.

=== Efficiency ===
Pos	Player	Club	PIR
1	(Canada) Ross Bekkering	Donar	21.3
2	(United States) Lance Jeter	Donar	18.9
3	(Canada) Tyson Hinz	Landstede	18.9

=== Points ===
Pos	Player	Club	PPG
1	(United States) Javier Duren	Aris Leeuwarden	17.7
2	(Netherlands) Worthy de Jong	ZZ Leiden	17.2
3	(Belgium) Thomas Dreesen	BS Weert	16.7

=== Rebounds ===
Pos	Player	Club	RPG
1	(Canada) Ross Bekkering	Donar	10.5
2	(United States) Ricardo Glenn	Landstede	9.5
3	(Serbia) Dejan Kravic	SPM Shoeters	9.4

=== Assists ===
Pos	Player	Club	APG
1	(Netherlands) Nigel Van Oostrum	Aris Leeuwarden	8.1
2	(Netherlands) Aron Royé	Apollo Amsterdam	4.5
3	(Netherlands) Leon Williams	SPM Shoeters	4.0
