= 2016–17 Dutch Basketball League =

Dutch Basketball League
- Season: 2016–17
- Duration: 8 October 2016 – 25 May 2017
- Games played: 133
- Teams: 8

Regular season
- Top seed: Donar
- Season MVP: Lance Jeter (Donar)

Finals
- Champions: Donar (6th title)
- Runners-up: Landstede Zwolle
- Playoffs MVP: Chase Fieler (Donar)

Statistical leaders
Points	Jordan Gregory	18.5
Rebounds	Charles Mitchell	10.9
Assists	Lance Jeter	6.2
Index Rating	Chase Fieler	21.5

The 2016–17 Dutch Basketball League was the 57th season of the Dutch Basketball League, the highest professional basketball league in the Netherlands. The season started on October 8, 2016 and ended May 25, 2017. Donar successfully defended its title.

== Teams ==
Location of teams in 2016–17 Dutch Basketball League

Den Bosch and BSW were both close to bankruptcy in the offseason, but managed to stay alive. Challenge Sports Rotterdam changed its name to Forward Lease Rotterdam, after they got a new main sponsor. On November 1, Den Bosch changed its name to New Heroes.

Club	Location	Venue	Capacity
Apollo Amsterdam	Amsterdam	Apollohal	1,500
Aris Leeuwarden	Leeuwarden	Sportcentrum Kalverdijkje	1,700
BSW	Weert	Sporthal Boshoven	1,000
Donar	Groningen	MartiniPlaza	4,350
Forward Lease Rotterdam	Rotterdam	Topsportcentrum	1,000
Landstede	Zwolle	Landstede Sportcentrum	1,200
New Heroes	's-Hertogenbosch	Maaspoort	2,800
Zorg en Zekerheid Leiden	Leiden	Vijf Meihal	2,000

== Foreign players ==
The number of foreign players during the 2016–17 season was restricted to four per DBL team.

Team	Player 1	Player 2	Player 3	Player 4	Left during season
Apollo Amsterdam	(Suriname) Sergio De Randamie				
Aris Leeuwarden	(United States) Jordan Gregory	(United States) Denton Koon	(Canada) Meshack Lufile	(United States) George Marshall	
BSW					
Donar	(United States) Lance Jeter	(United States) Andrew Smith	(Croatia) Drago Pašalić	(United States) Chase Fieler	
Forward Lease Rotterdam	(United States) Gregory Mays	(United States) Jermaine Marshall			(United States) La'Shard Anderson (United States) Anthlon Bell
Landstede	(United States) J.T. Tiller	(United States) Keegan Hylan	(United States) J.T. Yoho	(United States) Clayton Vette	
New Heroes	(United States) D. J. Balentine	(United States) Justin Watts	(United States) Charles Mitchell	(United States) Steve McWhorther	(United States) Antwan Scott
Zorg en Zekerheid Leiden	(United States) Daviyon Draper	(United States) Jonathan Michael Lee	(Belgium) Leigh Enobakhare		(United States) Cashmere Wright

== Regular season ==
The Regular season started on 8 October 2016 and finished 8 April 2017.

=== Standings ===
Pos	Team	Pld	W	L	PF	PA	PD	Pts	Qualification
1	Donar	28	26	2	2337	1753	+584	52	Qualification to semifinals
2	Landstede	28	20	8	2176	1947	+229	40	Qualification to semifinals
3	ZZ Leiden	28	19	9	2032	1903	+129	38	Qualification to quarterfinals
4	New Heroes	28	14	14	2081	2080	+1	28	Qualification to quarterfinals
5	Forward Lease Rotterdam	28	12	16	2086	2212	−126	24	Qualification to quarterfinals
6	Apollo Amsterdam	28	9	19	2093	2294	−201	18	Qualification to quarterfinals
7	Aris Leeuwarden	28	8	20	2088	2388	−300	16	
8	BSW	28	4	24	1966	2282	−316	8	

Source: Dutch Basketball League, Scoresway

== Play-offs ==
The play-offs started on April 15 and ended on May 28, 2017. In the quarterfinals a best-of-three format is used, while in the semifinals and finals in a best-of-seven format.

Quarterfinals
4 New Heroes	82	79
5 Forward Lease Rotterdam	61	65
3 ZZ Leiden	79	78	75
6 Apollo Amsterdam	82	70	56

Semifinals
1 Donar	84	96	77	72
4 New Heroes	76	60	64	68
2 Landstede	82	92	78	67	84	60	83
3 ZZ Leiden	88	81	64	76	78	84	56

Finals
1 Donar	80	96	74	76	85
2 Landstede	45	51	79	48	55

Source: DBL

== Final standings ==
The final standings are based upon performance in the playoffs.

Pos	Team	Pld	W	L	Qualification
1	Donar (C, O)	37	34	3	Qualification to Champions League qualifying rounds
2	Landstede	36	24	12	
3	ZZ Leiden	38	24	14	
4	New Heroes	34	16	18	
5	Forward Lease Rotterdam	30	12	18	
6	Apollo Amsterdam	31	10	21	
7	Aris Leeuwarden	28	8	20	
8	BSW	28	4	24	

Source: DBL
(C) Champions; (O) Play-off winners

== Awards ==
Most Valuable Player

Pos	Player	Team	Ref
G	(United States) Lance Jeter	Donar	

Play-offs MVP

Pos	Player	Team	Ref
F	(United States) Chase Fieler	Donar	

All-DBL Team

Pos	Player	Team	Ref
G	(United States) Lance Jeter	Donar	
G	(United States) J.T. Tiller	Landstede	
F	(United States) Clayton Vette	Landstede	
F	(United States) Chase Fieler	Donar	
C	(Croatia) Drago Pašalić	Donar	

MVP Under 23

Pos	Player	Team	Ref
G	(Netherlands) Maarten Bouwknecht	Den Bosch	

Sixth Man of the Year

Pos	Player	Team	Ref
G	(Netherlands) Arvin Slagter	Donar	

Most Improved Player

Pos	Player	Team	Ref
G	(Netherlands) Maarten Bouwknecht	New Heroes	

Defensive Player of the Year

Pos	Player	Team	Ref
G	(United States) J.T. Tiller	Landstede	

Rookie of the Year

Pos	Player	Team	Ref
F	(Netherlands) Olaf Schaftenaar	Landstede	

Sixth Man of the Year

Pos	Player	Team	Ref
G	(Netherlands) Arvin Slagter	Donar	

DBL All-Defense Team

Pos	Player	Team	Ref
G	(Netherlands) Sean Cunningham	Donar	
G	(United States) J.T. Tiller	Landstede	
F	(Netherlands) Jason Dourisseau	Donar	
F	(Netherlands) Mohamed Kherrazi	ZZ Leiden	
C	(Netherlands) Thomas Koenis	Donar	

DBL All-Rookie Team

Pos	Player	Team	Ref
G	(Netherlands) Rens Butter	ZZ Leiden	
G	(Netherlands) Sam van Dijk	Challenge Sports Rotterdam	
F	(Netherlands) Marijn Ververs	ZZ Leiden	
F	(Netherlands) Jules Schild	BSW	
F	(Netherlands) Olaf Schaftenaar	Landstede	

Coach of the Year

Player	Team	Ref
(Netherlands) Erik Braal	Donar	
