= 2019 FIBA U18 European Championship =

International basketball competition

2019 FIBA Europe Under-18 Championship

Tournament details
- Host country: Greece
- City: Volos
- Dates: 27 July – 4 August
- Teams: 16
- Venue(s): 2

Final positions
- Champions: Spain (4th title)
- Runners-up: Turkey
- Third place: Slovenia
- Fourth place: Greece

Tournament statistics
- Games played: 56
- MVP: (Spain) Santiago Aldama
- Top scorer: (Montenegro) Bojan Tomašević (21.0 ppg)
- Top rebounds: (Spain) Usman Garuba (12.9 rpg)
- Top assists: (Netherlands) Keye van der Vuurst de Vries (9.6 apg)

Official website
- www.fiba.basketball

The 2019 FIBA U18 European Championship was the 36th edition of the FIBA U18 European Championship. The competition took place in Volos, Greece, from 27 July to 4 August 2019.

== Participating teams ==
- Croatia
- Finland
- France
- Germany
- Great Britain
- Greece (Automatically qualified as host)
- Italy
- Latvia
- Lithuania
- Montenegro
- Netherlands ▲ (Winners, 2018 FIBA U18 European Championship Division B)
- Russia
- Serbia
- Slovenia ▲ (Runners-up, 2018 FIBA U18 European Championship Division B)
- Spain
- Turkey

== Venues ==
Volos	Portariá	2019 FIBA U18 European Championship is located in Greece
Nea Ionia Indoor Hall	Portaria Indoor Hall	2019 FIBA U18 European Championship is located in Greece
Capacity: 1,964	Capacity: 650	2019 FIBA U18 European Championship is located in Greece

== Preliminary round ==
The draw ceremony was held on 13 December 2018 in Belgrade, Serbia.

=== Group A ===
Pos	Team	Pld	W	L	PF	PA	PD	Pts
1	Serbia	3	2	1	236	222	+14	5
2	Turkey	3	2	1	231	191	+40	5
3	Germany	3	1	2	208	203	+5	4
4	Great Britain	3	1	2	214	273	−59	4

Source: FIBA
Rules for classification: 1) Points; 2) Head-to-head results; 3) Points difference; 4) Points scored.

27 July 2019
16:45

Boxscore

Great Britain	61–102	Turkey
Scoring by quarter: 12–22, 11–25, 21–28, 17–27
Pts: Feeney, Sulaiman 10; Rebs: Feeney 8 Asts: Evbuomwan, Sulaiman 3		Pts: Kurtuldum 19; Rebs: Şengün 8 Asts: Kurtuldum 9

Portaria Indoor Hall, Portariá

27 July 2019
19:00

Boxscore

Germany	68–75	Serbia
Scoring by quarter: 17–17, 14–22, 18–14, 19–22
Pts: Van Slooten 13; Rebs: Begue 9 Asts: Zdravevski 5		Pts: Pažin 27; Rebs: Pokuševski 13; Asts: Pažin 6

Portaria Indoor Hall, Portariá

28 July 2019
14:30

Boxscore

Turkey	62–54	Germany
Scoring by quarter: 14–8, 16–14, 7–21, 25–11
Pts: Şengün 28; Rebs: Şengün 11; Asts: İlyasoğlu 4		Pts: Zdravevski 11; Rebs: Hukporti 8 Asts: Delow 3

Nea Ionia Indoor Hall, Volos

28 July 2019
16:45

Boxscore

Serbia	85–87 (OT)	Great Britain
Scoring by quarter: 16–14, 23–17, 18–20, 20–26, Overtime: 8–10
Pts: Pažin, Marković 14; Rebs: Pokuševski 10; Asts: Pokuševski 6		Pts: Udoje 22; Rebs: Sulaiman 13; Asts: Chive 5

Nea Ionia Indoor Hall, Volos

29 July 2019
14:30

Boxscore

Great Britain	66–86	Germany
Scoring by quarter: 17–20, 26–25, 15–22, 8–19
Pts: Sulaiman 14; Rebs: Okros 7 Asts: three players 3		Pts: Samare 21; Rebs: Samare 9 Asts: Baggette 6

Portaria Indoor Hall, Portariá

29 July 2019
19:00

Boxscore

Serbia	76–67	Turkey
Scoring by quarter: 16–18, 20–14, 18–11, 22–24
Pts: Langović 14; Rebs: Marković 11; Asts: Pokuševski 6		Pts: Görener 15; Rebs: Haltali 10; Asts: Kucuk 3

Portaria Indoor Hall, Portariá

=== Group B ===
Pos	Team	Pld	W	L	PF	PA	PD	Pts
1	Montenegro	3	2	1	201	209	−8	5
2	Russia	3	2	1	216	197	+19	5
3	Italy	3	1	2	174	183	−9	4
4	Lithuania	3	1	2	194	196	−2	4

Source: FIBA
Rules for classification: 1) Points; 2) Head-to-head results; 3) Points difference; 4) Points scored.

27 July 2019
14:30

Boxscore

Italy	54–62	Montenegro
Scoring by quarter: 13–18, 9–10, 11–13, 21–21
Pts: Filoni 15; Rebs: Grant, Possamai 7 Asts: Schina, Filoni 2		Pts: Tomašević 15; Rebs: Tomašević 9 Asts: Kljajić 6

Portaria Indoor Hall, Portariá

27 July 2019
21:15

Boxscore

Russia	74–60	Lithuania
Scoring by quarter: 21–12, 14–17, 21–9, 18–22
Pts: Lakhin 18; Rebs: Lakhin 9 Asts: Belousov 5		Pts: Kancleris 14; Rebs: Tubelis 8 Asts: Marčiulionis 3

Portaria Indoor Hall, Portariá

28 July 2019
19:00

Boxscore

Lithuania	58–64	Italy
Scoring by quarter: 17–8, 12–28, 18–20, 11–8
Pts: Tubelis 15; Rebs: Kancleris 9 Asts: Kancleris, Pankratjevas 3		Pts: Casarin 13; Rebs: Ladurner 11; Asts: Casarin, Filoni 3

Nea Ionia Indoor Hall, Volos

28 July 2019
21:15

Boxscore

Montenegro	81–79	Russia
Scoring by quarter: 22–19, 18–14, 20–21, 21–25
Pts: Tomašević, Kljajić 22; Rebs: Vujisić 11; Asts: Kljajić 7		Pts: Belousov 26; Rebs: Kadoshnikov 8 Asts: Belousov 5

Portaria Indoor Hall, Portariá

29 July 2019
16:45

Boxscore

Montenegro	58–76	Lithuania
Scoring by quarter: 12–8, 17–14, 15–27, 14–27
Pts: Marinović 13; Rebs: Marinović, Bojičić 10; Asts: Milović 3		Pts: Marčiulionis 14; Rebs: Tubelis 13; Asts: Rimkus, Vaištaras 4

Nea Ionia Indoor Hall, Volos

29 July 2019
19:00

Boxscore

Russia	63–56	Italy
Scoring by quarter: 12–18, 22–16, 17–10, 12–12
Pts: Ruzhentsev 17; Rebs: Kadoshnikov, Lakhin 9 Asts: Kardanakhishvili 4		Pts: Procida, Donadio 13; Rebs: Procida, Filoni 6 Asts: Procida 3

Nea Ionia Indoor Hall, Volos

=== Group C ===
Pos	Team	Pld	W	L	PF	PA	PD	Pts
1	France	3	3	0	219	170	+49	6
2	Greece (H)	3	2	1	209	208	+1	5
3	Slovenia	3	1	2	179	209	−30	4
4	Latvia	3	0	3	208	228	−20	3

Source: FIBA
Rules for classification: 1) Points; 2) Head-to-head results; 3) Points difference; 4) Points scored.
(H) Hosts

27 July 2019
14:30

Boxscore

Slovenia	52–66	France
Scoring by quarter: 14–11, 10–19, 14–16, 14–20
Pts: Samar, Glas 12; Rebs: Stavrov 7 Asts: Samar 4		Pts: Begarin 15; Rebs: Diabate 8 Asts: Crusol, Thirouard-Samson 4

Nea Ionia Indoor Hall, Volos

27 July 2019
21:15

Boxscore

Greece	82–74	Latvia
Scoring by quarter: 18–28, 27–18, 15–17, 22–11
Pts: Nikolaidis 17; Rebs: Sotiriou 14; Asts: Nikolaidis 3		Pts: Ķilps 18; Rebs: Beks 7 Asts: Ķilps 10

Nea Ionia Indoor Hall, Volos

28 July 2019
16:45

Boxscore

Latvia	71–73	Slovenia
Scoring by quarter: 14–15, 23–20, 17–19, 17–19
Pts: Ķilps 18; Rebs: Ķilps, Šteinbergs 9 Asts: Ķilps 7		Pts: Samar 20; Rebs: Samar 10; Asts: Samar 5

Portaria Indoor Hall, Portariá

28 July 2019
21:15

Boxscore

France	80–55	Greece
Scoring by quarter: 22–13, 23–9, 16–19, 19–14
Pts: Gauzin 16; Rebs: Diabate 20; Asts: Crusol 5		Pts: Sotiriou 15; Rebs: Kourtidis 6 Asts: Karampelas 7

Nea Ionia Indoor Hall, Volos

29 July 2019
16:45

Boxscore

France	73–63	Latvia
Scoring by quarter: 17–11, 15-15, 22–19, 19–18
Pts: Cazalon 20; Rebs: Diabate 10; Asts: Crusol 4		Pts: Ķilps 15; Rebs: Šteinbergs 7 Asts: Ķilps 9

Portaria Indoor Hall, Portariá

29 July 2019
21:15

Boxscore

Greece	72–54	Slovenia
Scoring by quarter: 19–16, 19–14, 17–9, 17–15
Pts: Nikolaidis 18; Rebs: Rogkavopoulos 10; Asts: Karampelas 5		Pts: Samar, Glas 11; Rebs: Prepelič 10; Asts: Samar 5

Nea Ionia Indoor Hall, Volos

=== Group D ===
Pos	Team	Pld	W	L	PF	PA	PD	Pts
1	Spain	3	3	0	261	185	+76	6
2	Netherlands	3	1	2	216	220	−4	4
3	Finland	3	1	2	159	194	−35	4
4	Croatia	3	1	2	198	235	−37	4

Source: FIBA
Rules for classification: 1) Points; 2) Head-to-head results; 3) Points difference; 4) Points scored.

27 July 2019
16:45

Boxscore

Netherlands	65–98	Spain
Scoring by quarter: 16–27, 23–24, 6–20, 20–27
Pts: Enaruna 16; Rebs: Enaruna 7 Asts: De Vries 5		Pts: Garuba 18; Rebs: Dike 10; Asts: García 11

Nea Ionia Indoor Hall, Volos

27 July 2019
19:00

Boxscore

Finland	55–60	Croatia
Scoring by quarter: 12–9, 18–24, 7–8, 18–19
Pts: Suokas 12; Rebs: Amzil 8 Asts: Sajantila 4		Pts: Gnjidić 14; Rebs: Bošnjak, Bulić 5 Asts: Gnjidić 5

Nea Ionia Indoor Hall, Volos

28 July 2019
19:00

Boxscore

Spain	81–45	Finland
Scoring by quarter: 16–17, 16–9, 22–9, 27–10
Pts: Garuba 18; Rebs: Garuba 12; Asts: Carreño 4		Pts: Blomgren 10; Rebs: Amzil 7 Asts: Sajantila 4

Portaria Indoor Hall, Portariá

28 July 2019
14:30

Boxscore

Croatia	63–98	Netherlands
Scoring by quarter: 14–36, 18–17, 11–25, 20-20
Pts: Rudan 20; Rebs: Bošnjak 7 Asts: Lukačić 3		Pts: Enaruna 29; Rebs: Bergens, De Vries 6 Asts: De Vries 12

Portaria Indoor Hall, Portariá

29 July 2019
14:30

Boxscore

Netherlands	53–59	Finland
Scoring by quarter: 10–12, 18–19, 10–22, 15–6
Pts: Enaruna 13; Rebs: Enaruna 13; Asts: De Vries 5		Pts: Tainamo 19; Rebs: Tainamo 11; Asts: Blomgren 5

Nea Ionia Indoor Hall, Volos

29 July 2019
21:15

Boxscore

Croatia	75–82	Spain
Scoring by quarter: 24–24, 24–20, 19–20, 8–18
Pts: Rašić 34; Rebs: Rašić, Bošnjak 7 Asts: Škarica 5		Pts: Garuba 17; Rebs: Aldama 14; Asts: García 8

Portaria Indoor Hall, Portariá

== Final round ==
=== Bracket ===
Round of 16
31 July
Serbia	54
Lithuania	56
31 July
Greece	68
Finland	55
31 July
Russia	76
Germany	65
31 July
Spain	87
Latvia	52
31 July
Turkey	67
Italy	55
31 July
France	62
Croatia	53
31 July
Montenegro	62
Great Britain	77
31 July
Netherlands	72
Slovenia	79

Quarterfinals
1 August
Lithuania	66
Greece	70
1 August
Russia	77
Spain	84
1 August
Turkey	69
France	64
1 August
Great Britain	57
Slovenia	71

Semifinals
3 August
Greece	54
Spain	70
3 August
Turkey	72
Slovenia	64

Final
4 August
Spain	57
Turkey	53
3rd place game
4 August
Greece	57
Slovenia	81

5th–8th place semifinals
3 August
Lithuania	91
Russia (OT)	95
3 August
France	81
Great Britain	52

5th place game
4 August
Russia	57
France	101
7th place game
4 August
Lithuania	88
Great Britain	70

9th–16th place quarterfinals
1 August
Serbia	82
Finland	62
1 August
Germany	95
Latvia	57
1 August
Italy	68
Croatia	50
1 August
Montenegro	88
Netherlands	78

9th–12th place semifinals
3 August
Serbia	76
Germany	74
3 August
Italy	78
Montenegro	67

9th place game
4 August
Serbia	72
Italy	81
11th place game
4 August
Germany	73
Montenegro	63

13th–16th place semifinals
3 August
Finland	85
Latvia	83
3 August
Croatia	82
Netherlands	72

13th place game
4 August
Finland	66
Croatia	78
15th place game
4 August
Latvia	61
Netherlands	91

=== Round of 16 ===
31 July 2019
14:30

Boxscore

Turkey	67–55	Italy
Scoring by quarter: 7–11, 15–10, 24–14, 21–20
Pts: Kurtuldum 15; Rebs: Şengün 12; Asts: Şengün 6		Pts: Grant 14; Rebs: Grant, Donadio 7 Asts: Casarin 4

Portaria Indoor Hall, Portaria
Referees:
Gentian Cici (ALB)
Carsten Straube (GER)
Vladimir Jevtović (SRB)

31 July 2019
14:30

Boxscore

Spain	87–52	Latvia
Scoring by quarter: 18-18, 32–10, 23–8, 14–16
Pts: Aldama 19; Rebs: Garuba 10; Asts: Mejias, Dike 5		Pts: Ramza 13; Rebs: Šteinbergs 8 Asts: Šteinbergs 4

Nea Ionia Indoor Hall, Volos
Referees:
Georgios Poursanidis (GRE)
Michał Proc (POL)
Milan Španič (SLO)

31 July 2019
16:45

Boxscore

Russia	76–65	Germany
Scoring by quarter: 21–9, 14–24, 22–13, 19–19
Pts: Ruzhentsev, Gafurov 15; Rebs: Lakhin 10; Asts: Kardanakhishvili 8		Pts: Wagner 14; Rebs: Wagner 6 Asts: Delow 3

Portaria Indoor Hall, Portaria
Referees:
Saverio Lanzarini (ITA)
Zdravko Rutešić (MNE)
Ville Selkee (FIN)

31 July 2019
16:45

Boxscore

France	62–53	Croatia
Scoring by quarter: 18–13, 8–15, 12–13, 24–12
Pts: Diabate 19; Rebs: Diabate 13; Asts: Crusol 5		Pts: Gnjidić 13; Rebs: Bošnjak 9 Asts: Škarica 5

Nea Ionia Indoor Hall, Volos
Referees:
Wojciech Liszka (POL)
Iain Macdonald (GBR)
Christian Wilmore (BAH)

31 July 2019
19:00

Boxscore

Serbia	54–56	Lithuania
Scoring by quarter: 16–20, 11–16, 2–12, 25–8
Pts: Pokuševski 16; Rebs: Pažin 9 Asts: Pokuševski, Vasić 3		Pts: Kancleris 11; Rebs: Tubelis 14; Asts: Tubelis 5

Nea Ionia Indoor Hall, Volos
Referees:
Manuel Mazzoni (ITA)
Martin Horozov (BUL)
Arnaud Kom Njilo (CMR)

31 July 2019
19:00

Boxscore

Montenegro	62–77	Great Britain
Scoring by quarter: 14–17, 10–25, 17-17, 21–18
Pts: Kljajić 11; Rebs: Anđušić 7 Asts: Kljajić, Marinović		Pts: Okros 18; Rebs: Evbuomwan 7 Asts: Okros 5

Portaria Indoor Hall, Portaria
Referees:
Yener Yılmaz (TUR)
Thomas Bissuel (FRA)
Gvidas Gedvilas (LTU)

31 July 2019
21:15

Boxscore

Greece	68–55	Finland
Scoring by quarter: 8–14, 18-18, 13–19, 29–4
Pts: Nikolaidis 20; Rebs: Kourtidis 9 Asts: Karampelas, Rogkavopoulos 4		Pts: Amzil 26; Rebs: Amzil 9 Asts: Sajantila 4

Nea Ionia Indoor Hall, Volos
Referees:
Oskars Lucis (LAT)
Mārtiņš Kozlovskis (LAT)
Sergei Beliakov (RUS)

31 July 2019
21:15

Boxscore

Netherlands	72–79	Slovenia
Scoring by quarter: 7–23, 23–15, 17–21, 25–20
Pts: Enaruna 21; Rebs: Enaruna 13; Asts: De Vries 8		Pts: Prepelič, Glas 15; Rebs: Samar 10; Asts: Samar 8

Portaria Indoor Hall, Portaria
Referees:
Andris Aunkrogers (LAT)
Luis Castillo (ESP)
Josip Jurčević (CRO)

=== 9th–16th place quarterfinals ===
1 August 2019
14:30

Boxscore

Germany	95–57	Latvia
Scoring by quarter: 28–17, 24–14, 27–15, 16–11
Pts: Wagner 24; Rebs: Hukporti 8 Asts: Baggette 9		Pts: Krūmiņš 8 Rebs: Brencāns 5 Asts: Ķilps 5

Portaria Indoor Hall, Portaria
Referees:
Yener Yılmaz (TUR)
Sergei Beliakov (RUS)
Milan Španič (SLO)

1 August 2019
16:45

Boxscore

Italy	68–50	Croatia
Scoring by quarter: 14–15, 16–15, 17–7, 21–13
Pts: Grant 19; Rebs: Basso 9 Asts: Donadio 6		Pts: Bošnjak 9 Rebs: Rudan 11; Asts: three players 2

Portaria Indoor Hall, Portaria
Referees:
Georgios Poursanidis (GRE)
Thomas Bissuel (FRA)
Arnaud Kom Njilo (CMR)

1 August 2019
19:00

Boxscore

Serbia	82–62	Finland
Scoring by quarter: 24–11, 15–22, 18–13, 25–16
Pts: Vasić 12; Rebs: Marković 11; Asts: three players 4		Pts: Suokas, Amzil 11; Rebs: Amzil 6 Asts: Mervola 6

Portaria Indoor Hall, Portaria
Referees:
Saverio Lanzarini (ITA)
Gentian Cici (ALB)
Gvidas Gedvilas (LTU)

1 August 2019
21:15

Boxscore

Montenegro	88–78	Netherlands
Scoring by quarter: 18–19, 28–20, 14–19, 28–20
Pts: Tomašević 36; Rebs: Vujisić 11; Asts: Kljajić 7		Pts: Bergens 19; Rebs: Kraag, Enaruna 8 Asts: De Vries 9

Portaria Indoor Hall, Portaria
Referees:
Wojciech Liszka (POL)
Iain Macdonald (GBR)
Christian Wilmore (BAH)

=== Quarterfinals ===
1 August 2019
14:30

Boxscore

Russia	77–84	Spain
Scoring by quarter: 18–16, 22–35, 18–12, 19–21
Pts: Toptunov, Gafurov 13; Rebs: Gafurov 8 Asts: Kardanakhishvili, Kadoshnikov 3		Pts: Aldama 25; Rebs: Garuba 14; Asts: García, Aldama 4

Nea Ionia Indoor Hall, Volos
Referees:
Mārtiņš Kozlovskis (LAT)
Carsten Straube (GER)
Vladimir Jevtović (SRB)

1 August 2019
16:45

Boxscore

Turkey	69–64	France
Scoring by quarter: 11–16, 16–23, 17-17, 25–8
Pts: Görener 16; Rebs: Şengün 8 Asts: six players 2		Pts: Cazalon 21; Rebs: Diabate 10; Asts: Cazalon 5

Nea Ionia Indoor Hall, Volos
Referees:
Andris Aunkrogers (LAT)
Luis Castillo (ESP)
Josip Jurčević (CRO)

1 August 2019
19:00

Boxscore

Great Britain	57–71	Slovenia
Scoring by quarter: 10–18, 18–15, 16-16, 13–22
Pts: Okros 17; Rebs: Hughes 11; Asts: Chive, Evbuomwan 3		Pts: Prepelič 16; Rebs: Samar 10; Asts: Samar 14

Nea Ionia Indoor Hall, Volos
Referees:
Oskars Lucis (LAT)
Michał Proc (POL)
Ville Selkee (FIN)

1 August 2019
21:15

Boxscore

Lithuania	66–70	Greece
Scoring by quarter: 12–14, 14–7, 13–21, 11–15
Pts: Tubelis 23; Rebs: Tubelis 20; Asts: Sidarevičius 6		Pts: Rogkavopoulos 25; Rebs: Rogkavopoulos 15; Asts: Rogkavopoulos, Nikolaidis 3

Nea Ionia Indoor Hall, Volos
Referees:
Manuel Mazzoni (ITA)
Zdravko Rutešić (MNE)
Martin Horozov (BUL)

=== 13th–16th place semifinals ===
3 August 2019
19:00

Boxscore

Finland	85–83	Latvia
Scoring by quarter: 22–19, 22–23, 17–23, 24–18
Pts: Blomgren 21; Rebs: Amzil 9 Asts: Suokas 7		Pts: Ramza 20; Rebs: Šteinbergs 7 Asts: Ramza 7

Portaria Indoor Hall, Portaria
Referees:
Yener Yılmaz (TUR)
Luis Castillo (ESP)
Vladimir Jevtović (SRB)

3 August 2019
21:15

Boxscore

Croatia	82–72	Netherlands
Scoring by quarter: 19–24, 14–21, 26–15, 23–12
Pts: Rasic 24; Rebs: Bošnjak 9 Asts: Bošnjak 5		Pts: Kraag 17; Rebs: Enaruna 9 Asts: Vuurst de Vries 13

Portaria Indoor Hall, Portaria
Referees:
Manuel Mazzoni (ITA)
Martin Horozov (BUL)
Gvidas Gedvilas (LTU)

=== 9th–12th place semifinals ===
3 August 2019
14:30

Boxscore

Serbia	76–74	Germany
Scoring by quarter: 22–21, 21–24, 13–15, 20–14
Pts: Mašić 17; Rebs: Marković 6 Asts: three players 4		Pts: Hukporti 15; Rebs: Hukporti, Van Slooten 7 Asts: Delow 7

Portaria Indoor Hall, Portaria
Referees:
Sergei Beliakov (RUS)
Thomas Bissuel (FRA)
Iain Macdonald (GBR)

3 August 2019
16:45

Boxscore

Italy	78–67	Montenegro
Scoring by quarter: 15-11, 23-16, 24-22, 16-18
Pts: Procida 23; Rebs: Basso 7 Asts: Schina 7		Pts: Tomašević 24; Rebs: Tomašević 8 Asts: Kljajić 4

Portaria Indoor Hall, Portaria
Referees:
Oskars Lucis (LAT)
Milan Španič (SLO)
Christian Wilmore (BAH)

=== 5th–8th place semifinals ===
3 August 2019
14:30

Boxscore

Lithuania	91–95 (OT)	Russia
Scoring by quarter: 25–18, 19–23, 18–17, 17–21, Overtime: 12–16
Pts: Marčiulionis 21; Rebs: Tubelis 16; Asts: Tubelis 4		Pts: Ruzhentsev 21; Rebs: Chadov 8 Asts: Ruzhentsev 4

Nea Ionia Indoor Hall, Volos
Referees:
Georgios Poursanidis (GRE)
Arnaud Kom Njilo (CMR)
Josip Jurčević (CRO)

3 August 2019
16:45

Boxscore

France	81–52	Great Britain
Scoring by quarter: 12-21, 29-9, 17-11, 23-11
Pts: Thirouard-Samson 16; Rebs: Kamagate, Diabate 8 Asts: Gauzin, Crusol 4		Pts: Sulaiman 14; Rebs: Sulaiman 9 Asts: Chive 5

Nea lonia Indoor Hall, Volos
Referees:
Michał Proc (POL)
Zdravko Rutešić (MNE)
Ville Selkee (FIN)

=== Semifinals ===
3 August 2019
19:00

Boxscore

Turkey	72–64	Slovenia
Scoring by quarter: 15–14, 23–15, 11–21, 23–14
Pts: Şengün 15; Rebs: Şengün 8 Asts: Küçük 4		Pts: Glas 20; Rebs: Dušanič 10; Asts: Nemanič 4

Nea Ionia Indoor Hall, Volos
Referees:
Gentian Cici (ALB)
Wojciech Liszka (POL)
Carsten Straube (GER)

3 August 2019
21:15

Boxscore

Greece	54–70	Spain
Scoring by quarter: 20–12, 16–22, 10–25, 8–11
Pts: Rogkavopoulos 13; Rebs: Tsamis 4 Asts: Karampelas 7		Pts: Aldama 19; Rebs: Garuba 19; Asts: García 9

Nea Ionia Indoor Hall, Volos
Referees:
Andris Aunkrogers (LAT)
Saverio Lanzarini (ITA)
Mārtiņš Kozlovskis (LAT)

=== 15th place game ===
4 August 2019
12:00

Boxscore

Latvia	61–91	Netherlands
Scoring by quarter: 18–18, 18–23, 14–25, 11–25
Pts: Šteinbergs 14; Rebs: Šteinbergs 11; Asts: Krūmiņš 6		Pts: Enaruna 22; Rebs: Vuurst de Vries 9 Asts: Vuurst de Vries 15

Portaria Indoor Hall, Portaria
Referees:
Michał Proc (POL)
Thomas Bissuel (FRA)
Christian Wilmore (BAH)

=== 13th place game ===
4 August 2019
16:45

Boxscore

Finland	66–78	Croatia
Scoring by quarter: 19–22, 6–19, 27–12, 14–25
Pts: Blomgren 17; Rebs: Amzil 5 Asts: Sajantila 3		Pts: Bošnjak 17; Rebs: Bošnjak 10; Asts: Lukačić 4

Nea Ionia Indoor Hall, Volos
Referees:
Georgios Poursanidis (GRE)
Yener Yilmaz (TUR)
Carsten Straube (GER)

=== 11th place game ===
4 August 2019
14:15

Boxscore

Germany	73–63	Montenegro
Scoring by quarter: 24–16, 18–18, 13–17, 18–12
Pts: Slooten 13; Rebs: Hukporti 8 Asts: Begue 6		Pts: Tomašević 20; Rebs: Tomašević 7 Asts: Pajović 3

Portaria Indoor Hall, Portaria
Referees:
Andris Aunkrogers (LAT)
Ville Selkee (FIN)
Gvidas Gedvilas (LTU)

=== 9th place game ===
4 August 2019
16:30

Boxscore

Serbia	72–81	Italy
Scoring by quarter: 20–14, 21–25, 15–24, 16–18
Pts: Langović 18; Rebs: Langović 8 Asts: Manojlović 4		Pts: Donadio 27; Rebs: Basso 9 Asts: Procida 8

Portaria Indoor Hall, Portaria
Referees:
Martin Horozov (BUL)
Iain Macdonald (GBR)
Arnaud Kom Njilo (CMR)

=== 7th place game ===
4 August 2019
14:30

Boxscore

Lithuania	88–70	Great Britain
Scoring by quarter: 26–16, 17–16, 21–17, 24–21
Pts: Tubelis 18; Rebs: Tubelis 12; Asts: Mačionis 5		Pts: Evbuomwan 16; Rebs: Evbuomwan 10; Asts: Chive 4

Nea Ionia Indoor Hall, Volos
Referees:
Luis Castillo (ESP)
Zdravko Rutešić (MNE)
Vladimir Jevtović (SRB)

=== 5th place game ===
4 August 2019
18:45

Boxscore

Russia	57–101	France
Scoring by quarter: 12–28, 10–25, 16–23, 19–25
Pts: Ruzhentsev 10; Rebs: Goldin 8 Asts: Kardanakhishvili 4		Pts: Diabate 25; Rebs: Miyem 11; Asts: Cazalon 9

Portaria Indoor Hall, Portaria
Referees:
Oskars Lucis (LAT)
Josip Jurčević (CRO)
Milan Španič (SLO)

=== 3rd place game ===
4 August 2019
19:00

Boxscore

Greece	57–81	Slovenia
Scoring by quarter: 14–12, 13–14, 16–20, 14–35
Pts: Rogkavopoulos 14; Rebs: Rogkavopoulos 13; Asts: Karampelas 3		Pts: Glas 20; Rebs: Prepelič 14; Asts: Samar 12

Nea Ionia Indoor Hall, Volos
Referees:
Saverio Lanzarini (ITA)
Wojciech Liszka (POL)
Sergei Beliakov (RUS)

=== Final ===
4 August 2019
21:15

Boxscore

Spain	57–53	Turkey
Scoring by quarter: 13–16, 10–15, 19–12, 15–10
Pts: Aldama 23; Rebs: Garuba 14; Asts: García 3		Pts: Kurtuldum 19; Rebs: Şengün 11; Asts: İlyasoğlu 5

Nea Ionia Indoor Hall, Volos
Referees:
Manuel Mazzoni (ITA)
Mārtiņš Kozlovskis (LAT)
Gentian Cici (ALB)

== Final standings ==
Rank	Team	Record
1st place, gold medalist(s)	Spain	7–0
2nd place, silver medalist(s)	Turkey	5–2
3rd place, bronze medalist(s)	Slovenia	4–3
4	Greece	4–3
5	France	6–1
6	Russia	4–3
7	Lithuania	3–4
8	Great Britain	2–5
9	Italy	4–3
10	Serbia	4–3
11	Germany	3–4
12	Montenegro	3–4
13	Croatia	3–4
14	Finland	2–5
15	Netherlands	2–5
16	Latvia	0–7

Relegated to the 2022 FIBA U18 European Championship Division B

== Awards ==
2018 FIBA Europe
Under-18 Championship winner

Spain
Fourth title

Most Valuable Player
(Spain) Santiago Aldama

All-Tournament Team

- PG – (Slovenia) Žiga Samar
- SG – (Greece) Nikos Rogkavopoulos
- SF – (Spain) Santiago Aldama (MVP)
- PF – (Spain) Usman Garuba
- C – (Turkey) Alperen Şengün

== See also ==
- 2019 FIBA U18 European Championship Division B
- 2019 FIBA U18 European Championship Division C
