= Luukas Vaara =

Finnish basketball player (born 2001)

No. 20 – Val-Dieu Spirou Basket
- Position: Center
- League: BNXT League

Personal information
- Born: April 22, 2001 (age 25) Lahti, Finland
- Listed height: 2.07 m (6 ft 9 in)
- Listed weight: 100 kg (220 lb)

Career information
- High school: Helsinki Basketball Academy, (Helsinki, Finland)
- Playing career: 2018–present

Career history
- 2018–2019: Lahti Basketball
- 2019–2020: Pussihukat
- 2020–2021: HBA-Märsky
- 2021–2022: SIG Strasbourg
- 2022–2023: Phoenix Hagen
- 2023–2026: Salon Vilpas
- 2026–present: Spirou Charleroi

Luukas Vaara (born 22 April 2001) is a Finnish basketball player who plays for Salon Vilpas in Finnish Korisliiga. He started basketball in youth teams of Namika Lahti and Lahti Basketball.

== Career ==
In his early senior career, Vaara played in Finland for Lahti Basketball and Pussihukat. For the 2020–21 season, he joined Helsinki Basketball Academy team HBA-Märsky playing in second-tier Koripallon I-divisioona.

On 1 July 2021, Vaara signed with French club SIG Strasbourg. He played mostly with the U21-team but debuted in LNB Pro A with the first team.

On 15 June 2022, Vaara left Strasbourg and joined Phoenix Hagen in German second-tier Pro A.

In 2023, he returned to Finland and signed with Korisliiga team Vilpas Vikings in Salo for the 2023–24 season.

On July 9th, he signed with the Belgian club Spirou Charleroi from the BNXT League.

== International career ==
A former youth international, Vaara has played in six matches for the Finland national basketball team. He also represented Finland in the postponed 2021 Summer Universiade competitions in Chengdu in the summer 2023, where Finland finished 5th, the best position in the nation's history.
