= Thomas Tumba =

Finnish basketball player (born 2001)

No. 15 – Zeeuw & Zeeuw Rotterdam City
- Position: Forward
- League: BNXT League

Personal information
- Born: April 15, 2001 (age 25) Kinshasa, Democratic Republic of Congo
- Listed height: 1.96 m (6 ft 5 in)
- Listed weight: 100 kg (220 lb)

Career information
- High school: Helsinki Basketball Academy, (Helsinki, Finland); Redemption Christian Academy (Watervliet, New York)
- Playing career: 2017–present

Career history
- 2017–2021: HBA-Märsky
- 2022–2024: Kataja
- 2024: Morón
- 2024–2026: Kataja
- 2026–present: Rotterdam City Basketball

Career highlights
- Finnish Cup champion (2023); Korisliiga Rookie of the Year (2023); Korisliiga Defensive Player of the Year (2024); Korisliiga Sixth Man of the Year (2024)

Thomas Tumba Exaucia (born 15 April 2001) is a Finnish basketball player for Zeeuw & Zeeuw Rotterdam City of the BNXT League. Previously he was known as Thomas Exaucia, but since 2022, he started to use his mother's surname Tumba officially.

== Early career ==
In his youth, Tumba played basketball in local clubs Peli-Karhut and KTP Basket in Kotka, before joining Helsinki Basketball Academy in 2017. In August 2018, Tumba received an invitation with Awak Kuier to attend the Basketball Without Borders talent camp in Belgrad, Serbia. After four years playing with academy team HBA-Märsky, Tumba moved to United States in 2021 to join Redemption Christian Academy, and played one season in NEPSAC Power 5 -conference.

== Professional career ==
Tumba returned to Finland and signed with Joensuu-based team Kataja BC for the 2022–23 season. At the end of the season, Kataja won the Finnish Cup title, and the silver medal in Korisliiga. Tumba was also named the Rookie of the Year in Korisliiga. After the next 2023–24 season, Tumba was named the Sixth Man of the Year and the Defensive Player of the Year in Korisliiga.

On 29 July 2024, Tumba signed with Spanish team CB Morón in LEB Oro.

On 11 December 2024, Tumba returned to Finland and signed with his former club Kataja.

On July 20, 2026, he signed with Zeeuw & Zeeuw Rotterdam City of the BNXT League.

== International career ==
Tumba has played 76 games in Finnish youth national teams in total. He also represented Finland in the postponed 2021 Summer Universiade competitions in Chengdu in the summer 2023, where Finland finished 5th, the best position in the nation's history.

Tumba debuted in the Finland national team on 25 June 2024, in an Olympic qualifying preparatory friendly game against New Zealand, helping Finland take a 73–70 win.

== Personal life ==
Tumba was born in Kinshasa, Democratic Republic of the Congo (DRC). He holds dual citizenship of Finland and the DRC.
