= Prepelič =

Prepelič is a surname. Notable people with the surname include:

- Bine Prepelič (born 2001), Slovenian professional basketball player
- Klemen Prepelič (born 1992), Slovenian professional basketball player
