= Zack Bryant =

American basketball player

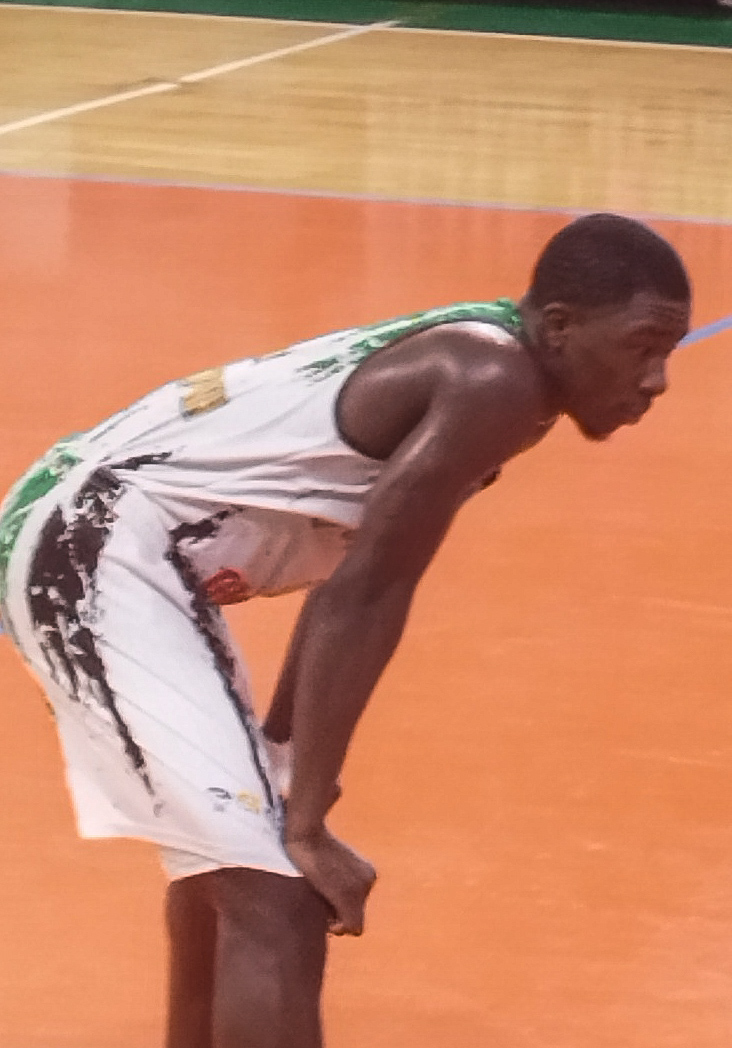
- Bryant in action with Milon

No. 3 – Bnei Herzliya
- Position: Point guard
- League: Israel Basketball Premier League

Personal information
- Born: November 24, 1997 (age 28) Hastings, Florida
- Listed height: 6 ft 2 in (1.88 m)
- Listed weight: 200 lb (91 kg)

Career information
- High school: Pedro Menendez (St. Augustine, Florida); Providence School (Jacksonville, Florida)
- College: UAB (2017–2019); Georgia Southern (2020–2021)
- NBA draft: 2021: undrafted
- Playing career: 2021–present

Career history
- 2021: BG Göttingen
- 2021–2022: Lahti Basketball
- 2022: Pallacanestro Cantù
- 2022: Czarni Słupsk
- 2022–2024: Ermis Schimatariou
- 2024: Milon
- 2024: Piratas de La Guaira
- 2025: Reales de La Vega
- 2025–2026: AGE Chalkida
- 2026–present: Bnei Herzliya

Career highlights
- Greek A2 Elite League champion (2024); Greek A2 Elite League MVP (2024); All-Greek A2 Elite League Team (2024); Third-team All-Conference USA (2019)

Zack Bryant (born November 24, 1997) is an American professional basketball player for Bnei Herzliya in the Israeli Basketball Premier League. He played college basketball for UAB and Georgia Southern.

== Early life and high school career ==
Bryant grew up in Hastings, Florida and played basketball and football. He attended Pedro Menendez High School for two seasons, and led the team to a district title in 2017. Bryant moved to Jacksonville, Florida to attend the Providence School prior to his junior year. He averaged 20.1 points and 5.9 assists per game as a senior, helping lead the team to a state runner-up finish. Bryant was named The Florida Times-Union's First Coast player of the year in 2017. Two of his brothers played football in college and Bryant was recruited to play college football as well. He committed to play basketball at UAB, the first school to offer him a scholarship, over Clemson, Georgia and Iowa State.

== College career ==
Bryant averaged 16.6 points, 3.2 rebounds, and 3.6 assists per game as a freshman, earning Conference USA All-Freshman Team honors. On January 26, 2019, he scored a career-high 30 points along with five rebounds and three assists in an 89–86 victory over Rice. As a sophomore, Bryant averaged 14.9 points, 3.9 assists (7th in the conference), 3.5 rebounds, and 1.8 steals (6th) per game. He was named to the Third Team All-Conference USA.

Bryant played three games during his junior season, averaging 11.0 points, 2.0 rebounds and 2.6 assists per game. He was dismissed from the team on November 18, 2019. Bryant transferred to Georgia Southern and sat out most of the 2019–20 season. He considered transferring after coach Mark Byington left to coach James Madison, but was persuaded to stay after new coach Brian Burg developed a relationship with him. As a senior, Bryant averaged 13.6 points (9th in the Sun Belt Conference), 2.6 rebounds, 2.6 assists and 1.2 steals per game, and shot 80.5% from the free throw line (5th).

== Professional career ==
=== 2021-24 ===
On July 5, 2021, Bryant signed his first professional contract with German team BG Göttingen of the Basketball Bundesliga.

On November 30, 2021, it was announced that Bryant had signed with the Finnish team Lahti Basketball of the Korisliiga. He averaged 21 points and 3.4 assists per game in eight games.

On February 2, 2022, he signed with the Italian team Acqua S.Bernardo Cantù of the Serie A2. He averaged 11.9 points and 1.8 assists per game, in 22 games.

On September 1, 2022, he signed with Czarni Słupsk of the Polish Basketball League (PLK).

He next played for the Greek team Ermis Schimatariou of the Greek HEBA A2. Playing 20 games for the team in 2022-23, he averaged 21.1 points (leading the league) and 4.0 assists per game, shooting 54.9% from the field. He played for the team again in 2023-24, averaging 20.8 points (leading the league) and 5.5 assists (7th) per game, shooting 50.5% from the floor, and 43.0% from three point range.

In 2024 he played for Milon in the Greek B Basket League for nine games, averaging 17.0 points and 5.2 assists per game shooting 55.3% from the floor, 41.4% from three-point range, and 80.4% from the three-point line. That year he also played for Piratas de La Guaira in the Venezuelan SuperLiga for nine games, averaging 13.4 points and 3.8 assists per game.

=== 2025-present ===
In 2025-26 he played for Bnei Herzliya in the Israeli Basketball Premier League. In eight games he averaged 21.0 points and 7.5 assists per game, shooting 54.8% from the floor, 48.3% from three-point range, and 83.3% from the free throw line. He continued playing for the team in the 2026-27 season.
