= Alexandros Nikolaidis (basketball) =

Greek basketball player

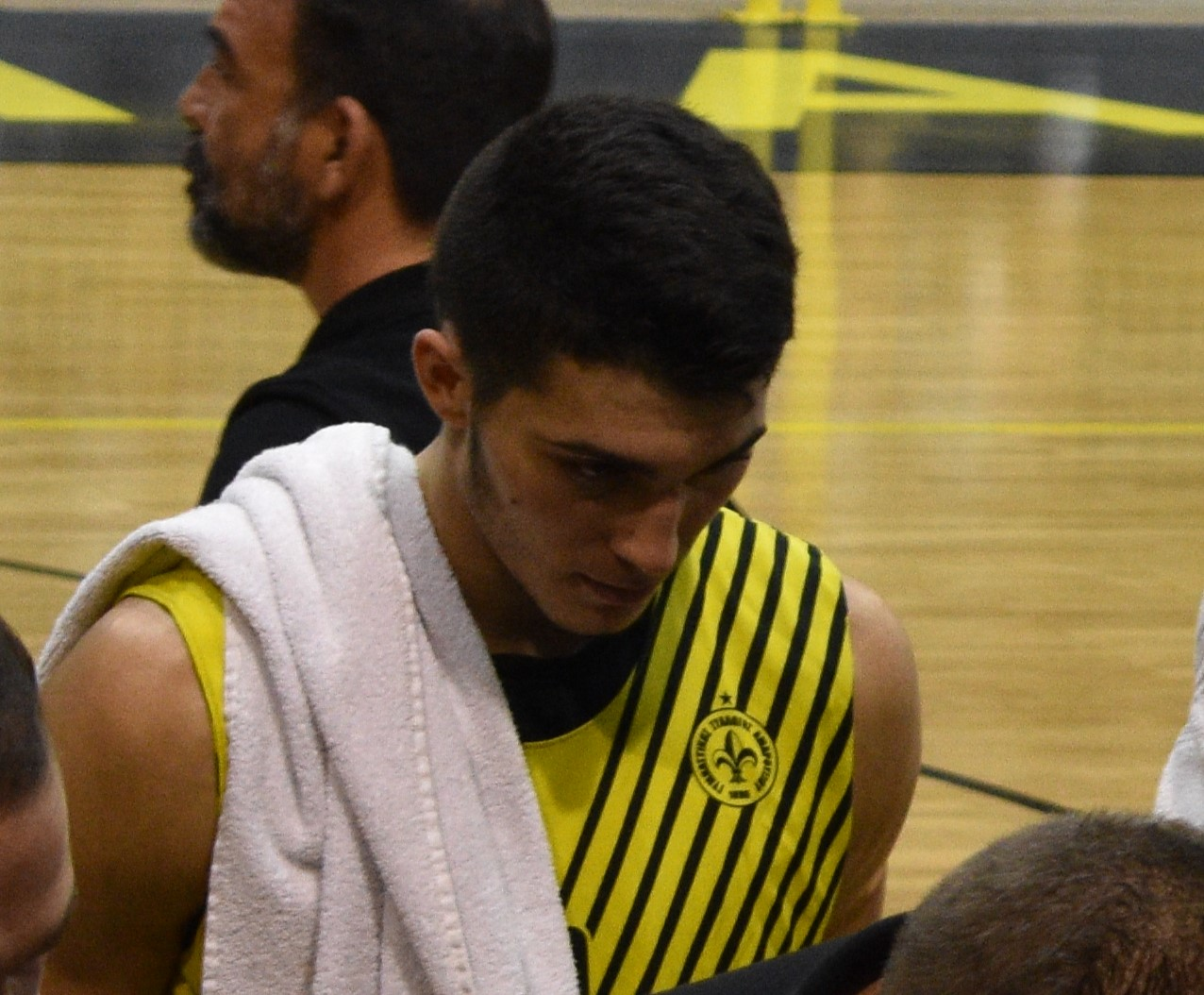
- Nikolaidis in 2023

No. 55 – Peristeri
- Position: Point guard / shooting guard
- League: Greek Basketball League

Personal information
- Born: August 21, 2002 (age 24) Greece
- Listed height: 6 ft 2.75 in (1.90 m)
- Listed weight: 175 lb (79 kg)

Career information
- Playing career: 2019–present

Career history
- 2019–2023: Olympiacos
- 2019–2021: →Olympiacos B
- 2021–2023: →Lavrio
- 2023–2025: Maroussi
- 2025–2026: Panionios
- 2026–present: Peristeri

Alexandros Nikolaidis (Greek: Αλέξανδρος Νικολαΐδης, born August 21, 2002) is a Greek professional basketball player for Peristeri B.C. of the Greek Basketball League. He is a 1.90 m (6'2 3/4") tall combo guard.

== Professional career ==
After playing in the Greek minor leagues with Mandoulides, Nikolaidis began his pro career in 2019, during the 2019–20 season, with the Greek 2nd Division club Olympiacos B Development Team, which is the reserve team of the Greek EuroLeague club Olympiacos Piraeus. Nikolaidis made his EuroLeague debut, with Olympiacos Piraeus, on 4 February 2020, in a EuroLeague 2019–20 season game versus the Lithuanian League club Žalgiris Kaunas. He replaced Georgios Printezis, as the youngest Greek born Olympiacos player to ever play in a EuroLeague game, and the second youngest Olympiacos player to ever play in a EuroLeague game overall, after Aleksej Pokuševski.

On August 16, 2021, Nikolaidis was loaned to Lavrio for the 2021–2022 season. In 21 league games, he averaged 6.9 points, 2.1 rebounds, 2.3 assists and 1.4 steals in 19 minutes per contest. On September 17, 2022, his loan agreement was renewed for another season. In 19 league games, Nikolaidis averaged 6.7 points, 2.6 rebounds and 2 assists in 21 minutes per contest.

On September 13, 2023, Nikolaidis signed with Maroussi. On July 5, 2025, it was announced that Nikolaidis will remain with the club until 2026. On December 17, 2025, he was traded to Panionios for George Papas.

== National team career ==
Nikolaidis was a member of the junior national teams of Greece. With Greece's junior national teams, he played at the 2018 FIBA Under-16 European Championship, and the 2019 FIBA Under-18 European Championship.

== Personal life ==
Nikolaidis' father, Sotos, is a former professional basketball player and a coach.His brother Apostolos (b. 2006) is also a professional basketball player, while their grandfather Apostolos Savvoulidis (1947–2015) was playing as goalkeeper for PAOK. During his club playing career, Nikolaidis' father played five seasons in Europe's top level EuroLeague competition, with the Greek clubs PAOK Thessaloniki and AEK Athens. As a youth, Nikolaidis' basketball idol was Vassilis Spanoulis.
