= Erik Sajantila =

Finnish basketball player (born 2001)

Kauhajoki Karhu
- Position: Shooting guard / power forward
- League: Korisliiga

Personal information
- Born: January 29, 2001 (age 25) Helsinki, Finland
- Listed height: 1.95 m (6 ft 5 in)
- Listed weight: 88 kg (194 lb)

Career information
- High school: Helsinki Basketball Academy (Helsinki, Finland)
- Playing career: 2017–present

Career history
- 2017–2021: HBA-Märsky
- 2021–2024: Lahti Basketball
- 2024–2025: Helsinki Seagulls
- 2025–2026: Landstede Hammers
- 2026–present: Kauhajoki Karhu

Career highlights
- Dutch League champion (2026); Finnish League champion (2025)

Erik Sajantila (born 29 January 2001) is a Finnish basketball player who plays for Korisliiga team Kauhajoki Karhu Basket.

He played for Helsinki Basketball Academy team HBA-Märsky during 2017–2021, before starting his senior career with Lahti. After winning the Finnish championship with Helsinki Seagulls in 2025, he joined Landstede Hammers where he also won the Dutch championship.

== Professional career ==
While playing for Lahti Basketball, Sajantila was named the Korisliiga Player of the Month in October 2023, with a record of 30.0 points, 5.2 rebounds and 3.8 assists per game during a 30-day span. He also scored 49 points against Bisons Loimaa.

On 25 June 2024, Sajantila signed with fellow Korisliiga team Helsinki Seagulls. They were crowned the Finnish champions in 2025.

On June 13, 2025, he signed with Landstede Hammers of the BNXT League, and went on to win the Dutch championship with the club.

After one season, he returned to Finland and joined Kauhajoki Karhu Basket for the 2026–27 season.

== International career ==
A former youth international, Sajantila also represented Finland in the postponed 2021 Summer Universiade competitions in Chengdu in the summer 2023, where Finland finished 5th, the best position in the nation's history.

He has played 11 games for the Finland B national team.

== Personal life ==
His father Martti Sajantila is a Finnish basketball coach and a former player who played for the Finland national basketball team. His uncle Antti Sajantila is a professor of medical jurisprudence at the University of Helsinki, who also played basketball in his teens.
