= Bojan Tomašević =

Montenegrin basketball player

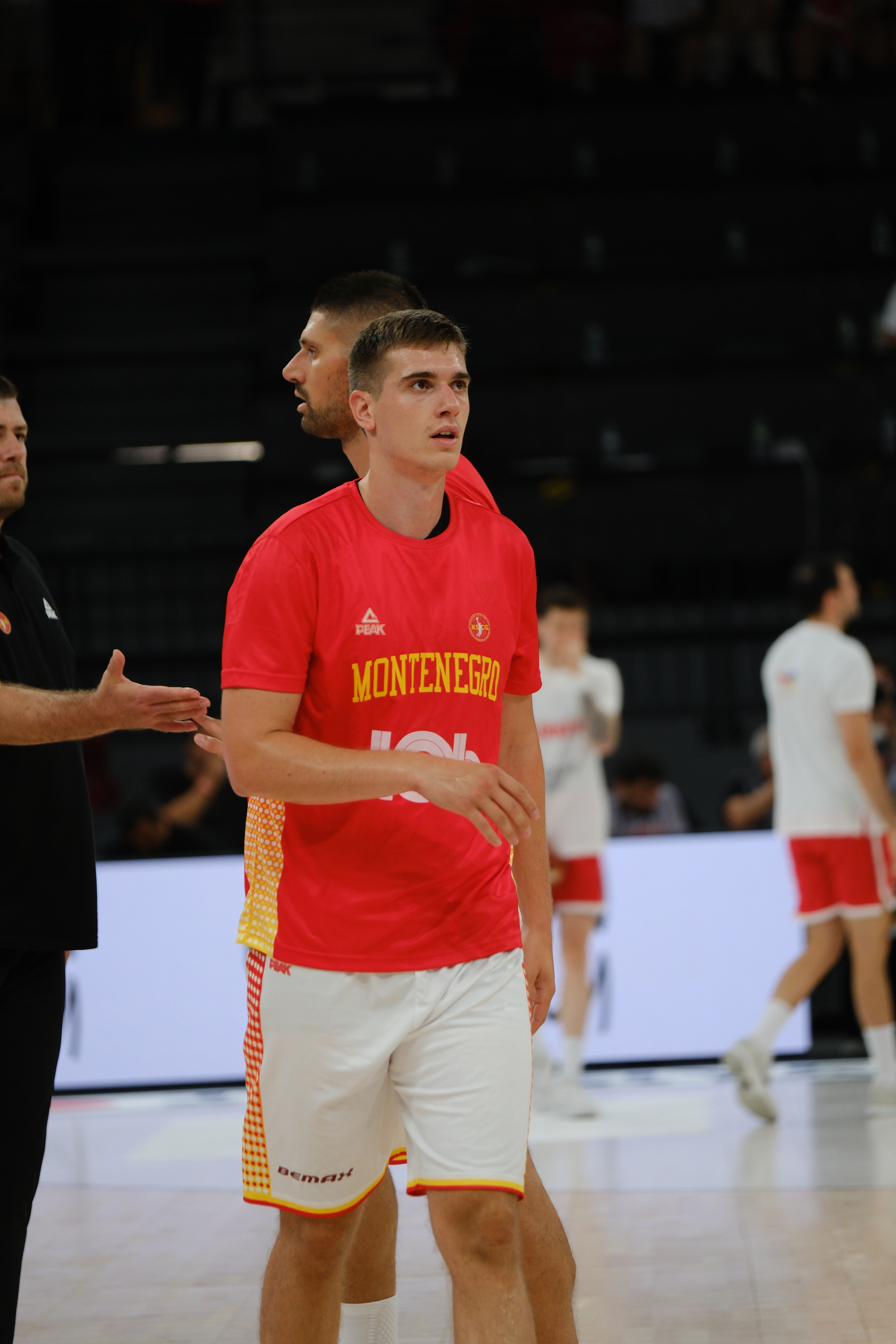
- Tomašević in 2025

No. 13 – Borac Čačak
- Position: Power forward
- League: Basketball League of Serbia; Adriatic League

Personal information
- Born: June 20, 2001 (age 25) Nikšić, Montenegro, FR Yugoslavia
- Listed height: 2.03 m (6 ft 8 in)
- Listed weight: 100 kg (220 lb)

Career information
- Playing career: 2019–present

Career history
- 2019: FMP
- 2019–2021: Dynamic Belgrade
- 2021–2024: Borac Čačak
- 2024–present: FMP

Career highlights
- All-Junior Adriatic League Team (2019)
Medals
Men's basketball
Representing Montenegro
FIBA Europe Under-16 Championship
Silver medal – second place	2017 Montenegro	U16 team

Bojan Tomašević (Serbian Cyrillic: Бојан Томашевић, born June 20, 2001) is a Montenegrin professional basketball player for FMP of the Basketball League of Serbia and the Adriatic League.

== Early career ==
Tomašević started to play basketball for OKK Montenegro in his hometown Nikšić. In summer 2015, Tomašević joined the Crvena zvezda youth team. Tomašević won the second place at the 2017–18 Junior ABA League season with the Zvezda. Over six tournament games, he averaged 11.3 points, 6.1 rebounds and 1.7 assists per game. In August 2018, Tomašević participated at the Basketball Without Borders Europe camp in Belgrade, Serbia. Tomašević won the second place at the 2018–19 Junior ABA League season with the Crvena zvezda U19 team. Over seven season games, he averaged 16.6 points, 6.4 rebounds and 1.7 assists per game, and he was selected to the Ideal Starting Five.

== Professional career ==
In April 2019, Crvena zvezda loaned out Tomašević to FMP of the Basketball League of Serbia. On April 27, he made his Serbian League debut against Zlatibor, making his two field goal attempts and one rebound in under 5 minutes of playing time.

On 11 September 2019, Tomašević signed for Dynamic Belgrade. Following the 2020–21 season Tomašević declared for the 2021 NBA draft. On July 19, 2021, he withdrawn his name from consideration for the 2021 NBA draft.

On 10 August 2021, Tomašević signed a three-year contract for Borac Čačak.

== National team career ==
Tomašević was a member of the Montenegro under-16 team that participated at the 2016 FIBA Europe Under-16 Championship in Radom, Poland. Over four tournament games, he averaged 3.8 points, 2.2 rebounds and 0.2 assists per game. Next year, he was a member of the under-16 team that won the silver medal at the 2017 FIBA Europe Under-16 Championship in Montenegro. Over seven tournament games, he averaged 13.6 points, 9.0 rebounds and 1.6 assists per game, and he was selected to the All-Tournament Team. Tomašević was a member of the Montenegro under-17 team that participated at the 2018 FIBA Under-17 Basketball World Cup in Argentina. Over seven tournament games, he averaged 19.1 points, 7.0 rebounds and 1.4 assists per game.

Tomašević was a member of the Montenegro national under-18 team that participated at the 2018 FIBA Europe Under-18 Championship in Latvia. Over seven tournament games, he averaged 13.3 points, 4.7 rebounds and 1.0 assists per game. He was the national U18 team member at the 2019 FIBA U18 European Championship in Volos, Greece. Over six tournament games, he averaged 21.0 points, 6.5 rebounds and 1.0 assists per game. He was the top scorer of the tournament. He was the top scorer of the tournament.
