= HBA-Märsky =

- Leagues: Koripallon I-divisioona; Naisten Korisliiga
- Founded: 2011; 15 years ago
- Arena: Urhea Areena
- Location: Helsinki, Finland
- Team colors: White and Blue
- Head coach: Jyri Lehtonen
- Website: www.hba.fi
Home	Away

HBA-Märsky is a Finnish basketball club, administrated by the Helsinki Basketball Academy. Their home arena is in URHEA Campus in Mäkelänrinne, Vallila, Helsinki, which also serves as the National Olympic Training Center.

== Helsinki Basketball Academy ==
Helsinki Basketball Academy is a joint program of the Finnish Basketball Association and Helsinki-based schools Mäkelänrinne Upper Secondary Sports School (nicknamed Märsky) and Pohjois-Haagan yhteiskoulu (PHYK). In 2022, a new training center was opened in Pirkkola Sports Park, Pirkkola, Helsinki, which is located near the PHYK school of Pohjois-Haaga.

The HBA program was created in 2011, with a strong influence by Henrik Dettmann, and started in 2012. The aim of the program is to develop young Finnish talented basketball players aged 13–19 to an international level for Finnish national teams, by providing year round professional coaching and education.

HBA-Märsky has teams for both boys/men and girls/women. The club's men's team competes in the Finnish second-tier Koripallon I-divisioona and its women's team plays in top-tier Naisten Korisliiga.

== Notable coaches ==
Coaches who work or have worked for the HBA-Märsky teams.

- (Finland) Petteri Koponen
- (Finland) Jyri Lehtonen
- (Finland) Anton Mirolybov
- (Finland) Hanno Möttölä
- (Finland) Jukka Toijala

== Notable former players ==
Note: Flags indicate national team eligibility at FIBA-sanctioned events. Players may hold other non-FIBA nationalities not displayed.

Criteria

To appear in this section a player must have either:

- Set a club record or won an individual award while at the club
- Played at least one official international match for their national team at any time
- Played at least one official NBA match at any time.

=== Men's team ===
- (Finland) Samu Adler
- (Finland) / (Ghana) Fiifi Aidoo
- (Finland) / (Morocco) Mustapha Amzil
- (Finland) Perttu Blomgren
- (Finland) Andre Gustavson
- (Finland) Mikael Jantunen
- (Finland) / (United States) Miro Little
- (Finland) Lauri Markkanen
- (Finland) / (Kosovo) Edon Maxhuni
- (Finland) Lassi Nikkarinen
- (Finland) / (Cameroon) Olivier Nkamhoua
- (Finland) Hannes Pöllä
- (Finland) Remu Raitanen
- (Finland) Erik Sajantila
- (Finland) Teemu Suokas
- (Finland) Ville Tahvanainen
- (Finland) Touko Tainamo
- (Finland) / (Democratic Republic of the Congo) Thomas Tumba
- (Finland) Luukas Vaara
- (Finland) Elias Valtonen

=== Women's team ===
- (Finland) / (Morocco) / (Cameroon) Sara Bejedi
- (Finland) / (South Sudan) Awak Kuier
