= Mārcis Šteinbergs =

Latvian basketball player (born 2001)

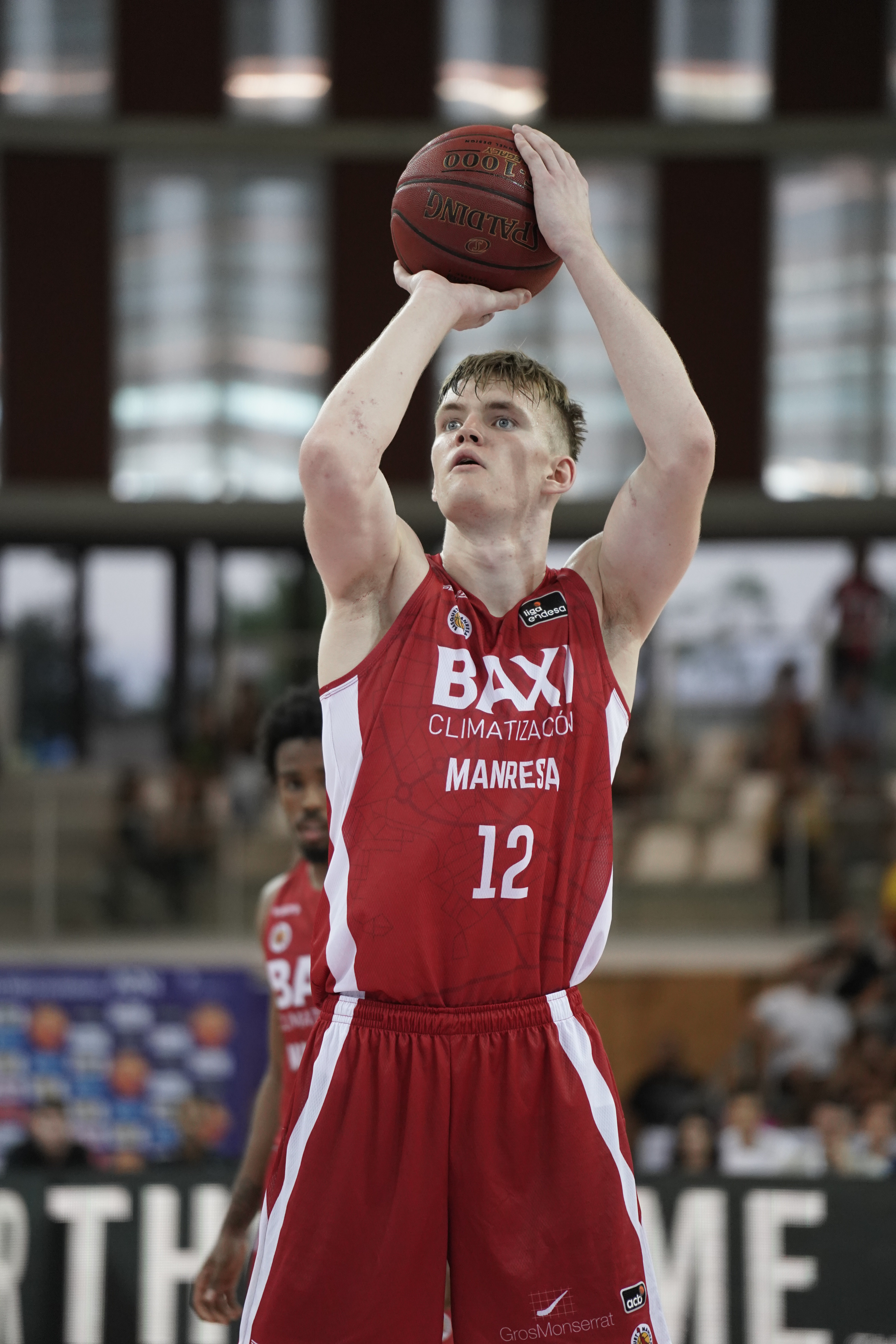
- Steinbergs with Bàsquet Manresa in 2022

No. 28 – UCAM Murcia
- Position: Power forward
- League: Liga ACB; Champions League

Personal information
- Born: 28 August 2001 (age 25) Ogre, Latvia
- Listed height: 6 ft 10 in (2.08 m)
- Listed weight: 217 lb (98 kg)

Career information
- NBA draft: 2023: undrafted
- Playing career: 2017–present

Career history
- 2017–2019: BK Ogre
- 2019–2021: CB Gran Canaria
- →2019–2021: CBA Gran Canaria
- 2021–2026: Bàsquet Manresa
- 2026–present: UCAM Murcia

Career highlights
- Lliga Catalana de Bàsquet champion (2021); Latvian Basketball Hope of the Year award (2022)
Medals
Men's basketball
Representing Latvia
European U-18 Championship
Silver medal – second place	2018 Latvia	Under-18

Mārcis Šteinbergs (born 28 August 2001) is a Latvian professional basketball player for UCAM Murcia of the Liga ACB. He also represents the senior Latvian national team. At a height of 2.08 m (6 ft 10 in), he plays at the power forward position.

== Professional career ==
Mārcis started his career at his hometown team BK Ogre. In January 2019, he signed a long-term deal with CB Gran Canaria. After playing mainly for the second team in Liga EBA and LEB Plata, Šteinbergs signed a contract with Baxi Manresa. With Manresa, he played in the 2022 Basketball Champions League Final Four. He has been nominated for the ACB Best Young Player Award on two occasions (2022, 2023).

On June 29, 2026, he signed with UCAM Murcia of the Liga ACB.

== National team ==
Mārcis represented Latvia in European U-18 Championship in 2018 and 2019. Šteinbergs has been called to the Latvian national team, playing in the Basketball World Cup qualification and EuroBasket 2025 qualification.

== Personal life ==
Mārcis' sister in a long time Latvia women's national basketball team leader Anete Šteinberga.
