= Perttu Blomgren =

Finnish basketball player (born 2001)

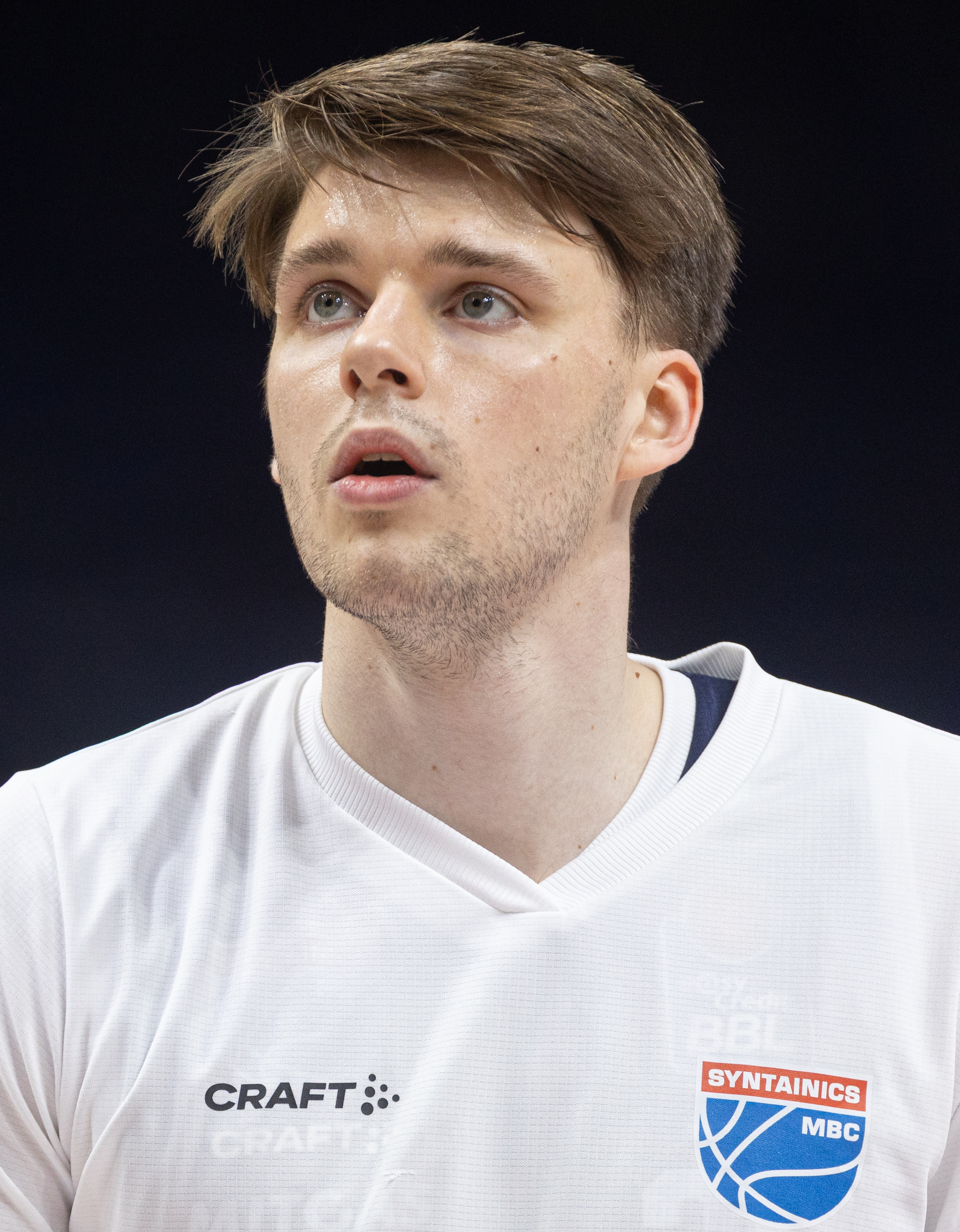
- Blomgren with Mitteldeutscher in 2025

No. 20 – Energa Trefl Sopot
- Position: Point guard / shooting guard
- League: PLK

Personal information
- Born: September 13, 2001 (age 25) Lapua, Finland
- Listed height: 1.95 m (6 ft 5 in)
- Listed weight: 88 kg (194 lb)

Career information
- High school: Helsinki Basketball Academy, (Helsinki, Finland)
- Playing career: 2016–present

Career history
- 2016–2018: Kobrat
- 2018–2020: HBA-Märsky
- 2020–2023: Salon Vilpas
- 2023–2024: Kansai Helios Domžale
- 2024: Bosna
- 2025: Ventspils
- 2025–2026: Mitteldeutscher BC
- 2026–present: Trefl Sopot

Career highlights
- Finnish Korisliiga champion (2021); Korisliiga Most Improved Player (2022); Korisliiga Defensive Player (2023)

Perttu Juhani Blomgren (born 13 September 2001) is a Finnish basketball player who plays as a point guard for Trefl Sopot in Polish Basketball League (PLK), and for the Finland national team.

== Professional career ==
Born in Lapua, Finland, Blomgren started his professional career with local club Kobrat in 2016 in first tier Korisliiga.

During 2018–2020 he played in second-tier Koripallon I-divisioona with Helsinki Basketball Academy team HBA-Märsky. In March 2017, he attended the Jordan Brand Classic -talent camp in Barcelona, Spain.

He joined Vilpas Vikings in Salo in 2020, and won the Finnish championship title with his team in 2021. Blomgren was named the Most Improved Player in 2022, and the Defensive Player of the Year in 2023.

After the 2022–23 season, Blomgren moved to Slovenia and signed a one-year deal with Kansai Helios Domžale (Helios Suns) in Slovenian First League and ABA League Second Division. At the end of the season, Blomgren helped Domžale to finish 2nd in Slovenian league and to win silver medal.

On 12 July 2024, Blomgren signed with KK Bosna in Bosnian League and ABA League Second Division.

After a stint with BK Ventspils in Latvian–Estonian Basketball League, Blomgren joined German team Mitteldeutscher BC in Basketball Bundesliga until the end of 2025.

== National team ==
A former youth international, Blomgren has played for the Finland senior national team. He also represented Finland in the postponed 2021 Summer Universiade competitions in Chengdu in the summer 2023, where Finland finished 5th, the best position in the nation's history.
