= Malte Delow =

German basketball player (born 2001)

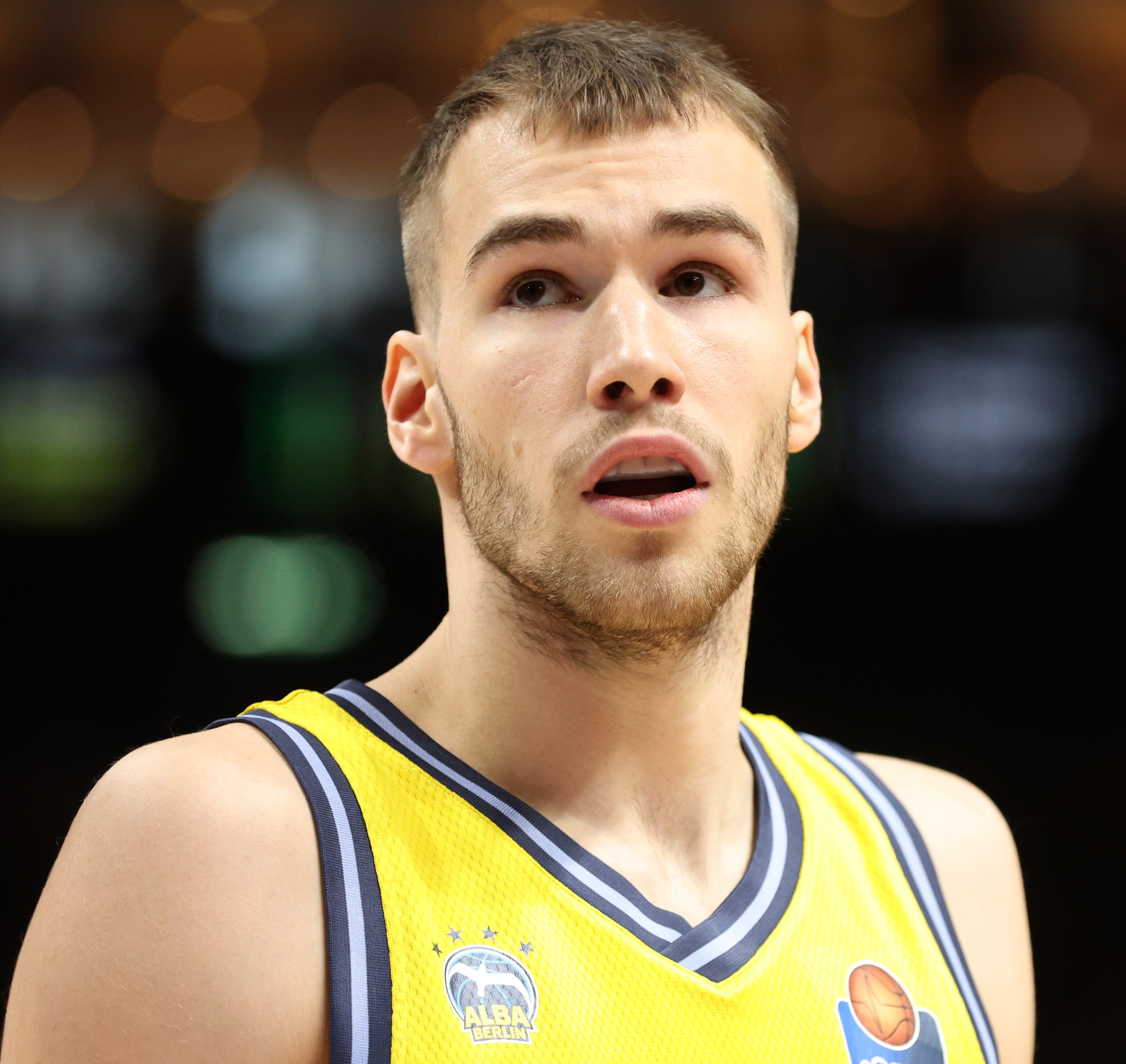

No. 6 – Alba Berlin
- Position: Small forward
- League: BBL

Personal information
- Born: 22 April 2001 (age 25) Berlin, Germany
- Listed height: 1.97 m (6 ft 6 in)
- Listed weight: 84 kg (185 lb)

Career information
- Playing career: 2017–present

Career history
- 2017–2019: Alba Berlin U18
- 2017–2019: →SSV Lokomotive Bernau
- 2019–present: Alba Berlin
- 2019–2022: →SSV Lokomotive Bernau

Career highlights
- 4x Bundesliga champion (2020–2022, 2026); 2x German Cup winner (2020, 2022)

Malte Delow (born 22 April 2001) is a German professional basketball player for Alba Berlin of the German Basketball Bundesliga (BBL). He plays the small forward position.

== Early life ==
Delow was born on 22 April 2001, in Berlin. Delow mostly played football growing up, before making the switch to basketball. After only a few months of playing basketball for the first time, Delow tried out for the youth team of Alba Berlin, where he eventually joined the club. Delow went through the youth system of Alba Berlin, winning two titles, at the U16 and U19 level.

== Professional career ==
During the 2017–18 season, Delow was loaned to second division club SSV Lokomotive Bernau, where he spent the first few seasons to begin his career. Prior to the 2019–20 season, Delow rejoined Alba Berlin, where he made his debut. He scored six points, in their victory against Vechta. At the conclusion of Delow's first season with the club, he helped the team capture their ninth Bundesliga title.

A year later, in June 2021, Delow signed his first professional contract with Alba Berlin through the 2024–25 season.

== National team career ==
Delow's first opportunity to represent Germany in international competition, came at the 2019 FIBA U18 European Championship. During the event with the Germany U18 national team, Delow finished with averages of 6 points, 3 rebounds and 3.4 assists per game.

Two years later, Delow represented the Germany U20 national team, at the 2021 FIBA U20 European Challengers competition. He completed the event with averages of 4.8 points, 4.8 rebounds and 2.8 assists per game. In July 2023, Delow was selected to play in an international U23 tournament with Germany.

The following year, in February 2024, Delow was selected to the senior Germany national team for the first time. He made his debut in a EuroBasket 2025 qualifier, scoring 13 points against Montenegro.

== Career statistics ==
Legend
GP	Games played	GS	Games started	MPG	Minutes per game
FG%	Field-goal percentage	3P%	3-point field-goal percentage	FT%	Free-throw percentage
RPG	Rebounds per game	APG	Assists per game	SPG	Steals per game
BPG	Blocks per game	PPG	Points per game	PIR	Performance index rating
**Bold**	Career high

=== EuroLeague ===
Year	Team	GP	GS	MPG	FG%	3P%	FT%	RPG	APG	SPG	BPG	PPG	PIR
2019–20	Alba Berlin	6	0	4.2	**.600**	**.500**	—	—	.2	.2	—	1.2	0.8
2020–21	Alba Berlin	23	2	8.3	.385	.267	.667	.9	.5	.4	—	1.6	0.7
2021–22	Alba Berlin	30	**15**	14.2	.395	.406	**.846**	1.9	.6	.4	—	2.9	1.9
2022–23	Alba Berlin	25	4	14.3	.513	.368	.571	2.0	1.0	.6	**.1**	3.9	3.1
2023–24	Alba Berlin	**34**	8	**16.9**	.390	.323	.783	**2.3**	**2.4**	**.8**	**.1**	**5.2**	**4.6**
Career		118	29	13.3	.420	.344	.761	1.7	1.1	.6	.0	3.4	2.7

=== Domestic leagues ===
Year	Team	League	GP	MPG	FG%	3P%	FT%	RPG	APG	SPG	BPG	PPG
2017–18	(Germany) Lok. Bernau	ProB	4	13.2	.125	.143	.000	1.0	1.0	1.2	—	0.7
2018–19	(Germany) Lok. Bernau	ProB	25	19.1	.393	.333	.846	2.8	1.0	.8	.3	4.6
2019–20	(Germany) Lok. Bernau	ProB	15	27.8	.365	.325	.719	4.1	3.9	1.5	.3	9.9
2019–20	(Germany) Alba Berlin	BBL	14	8.3	.286	.286	1.000	1.1	.5	.3	.1	1.6
2020–21	(Germany) Lok. Bernau	ProB	8	28.0	.381	.373	.550	6.6	2.5	1.5	.5	11.7
2020–21	(Germany) Alba Berlin	BBL	38	12.8	.410	.235	.692	2.0	.9	.6	.1	2.9
2021–22	(Germany) Lok. Bernau	ProB	9	21.7	.375	.280	.700	4.2	3.7	1.1	.3	9.8
2021–22	(Germany) Alba Berlin	BBL	34	17.2	.469	.383	.826	2.5	1.3	.8	.2	5.5
2022–23	(Germany) Alba Berlin	BBL	34	17.2	.450	.365	.759	2.7	2.0	.7	.1	5.6
2023–24	(Germany) Alba Berlin	BBL	46	19.5	.438	.295	.843	2.7	2.4	.5	.2	6.5
