= Teemu Suokas =

Finnish basketball player (born 2001)

Vilpas Vikings
- Position: Shooting guard
- League: Korisliiga

Personal information
- Born: March 27, 2001 (age 25) Helsinki, Finland
- Listed height: 1.88 m (6 ft 2 in)
- Listed weight: 80 kg (176 lb)

Career information
- High school: Helsinki Basketball Academy (Helsinki, Finland)
- College: Ball State (2020–2022)
- NBA draft: 2023: undrafted
- Playing career: 2017–present

Career history
- 2017–2018: Munkkiniemen Kisapojat
- 2017–2020: HBA-Märsky
- 2022–2023: Kauhajoki Karhu
- 2023–2024: Salon Vilpas
- 2024: Śląsk Wrocław
- 2024–2025: Kataja
- 2025: Cartagena
- 2025–present: Salon Vilpas

Career highlights
- 2x Korisliiga champion (2022, 2026); Korisliiga Most Improved Player (2024)

Teemu Suokas (born 27 March 2001) is a Finnish basketball player for Salon Vilpas in Korisliiga.

== Playing career ==
Suokas signed for Spanish team Cartagena for the 2025–26 season.

== International career ==
A former youth international, Suokas also represented Finland in the postponed 2021 Summer Universiade competitions in Chengdu in the summer 2023, where Finland finished 5th, the best position in the nation's history.

== Career statistics ==
Legend
GP	Games played	GS	Games started	MPG	Minutes per game
FG%	Field goal percentage	3P%	3-point field goal percentage	FT%	Free throw percentage
RPG	Rebounds per game	APG	Assists per game	SPG	Steals per game
BPG	Blocks per game	PPG	Points per game	**Bold**	Career high

=== College ===
Year	Team	GP	GS	MPG	FG%	3P%	FT%	RPG	APG	SPG	BPG	PPG
2020–21	Ball State	**19**	0	**10.3**	**.311**	**.296**	–	**1.1**	**.9**	**.1**	.0	**1.9**
2021–22	Ball State	4	0	4.5	.222	.000	.000	1.0	.3	.0	.0	1.0
Career		23	0	9.3	.296	.267	.000	1.1	.8	.0	.0	1.7
