= George Papas =

American basketball player (born 1998)

No. 5 – Olympiacos
- Position: Shooting guard
- League: Greek Basketball League; EuroLeague

Personal information
- Born: March 15, 1998 (age 28) Jersey City, New Jersey, U.S.
- Listed height: 6 ft 5 in (1.96 m)
- Listed weight: 198 lb (90 kg)

Career information
- High school: Union Catholic (Scotch Plains, New Jersey)
- College: Monmouth (2017–2022)
- NBA draft: 2022: undrafted
- Playing career: 2022–present

Career history
- 2022–2024: Olympiacos
- 2024: Promitheas Patras
- 2024–2025: Peristeri
- 2025: Panionios
- 2025–2026: Maroussi
- 2026–present: Olympiacos

Career highlights
- Greek League champion (2023); Greek Cup winner (2023); 3× Greek Super Cup winner (2022, 2023, 2026)

George Papas (Greek: Τζωρτζ Πάπας; born March 15, 1998) is an American-Greek professional basketball player for Olympiacos of the Greek Basketball League (GBL). Standing at 1.96 m (6 ft 5 in) tall, he plays at the shooting guard position.

== Early life ==
Papas was born in Jersey City, New Jersey, to Alexis Maloney and Greek-born Stefanos Papathanasiou. He has a brother 2 1/2 years his elder named Tommy, who played for Mykonos in the Greek B Basket League and for William & Mary on college level.

== College career ==
He reached the 1,000-point plateau for the Hawks in February against Marist. He also competed in the Dos Equis 3X3U 3-on-3 competition at the 2022 Final Four, the first Hawk ever selected to the event. He is also known for his antics on November 15, 2019, when Papas took the ball from Kansas point guard while time expired, to dunk the ball at the end of the game. The incident is widely regarded as classless and disrespectful, due to the “unwritten” rules of basketball.

== Professional career ==
On August 14, 2022, he signed a two-year deal, his first professional contract, with Olympiacos of the Greek Basket League and the EuroLeague.

In October 2022, he celebrated the first title of his professional career, which was the Greek Super Cup, in the Final 4 of Rhodes.

On October 10, 2022, he made his debut in the Greek Basket League, in the away match against Apollon Patras. He contributed 6 points, one rebound and one assist in 10 minutes of action in his team's 61–87 victory.

On December 12, 2022, Papas made his EuroLeague debut in the home game win against Fenerbahçe, playing 2:51 minutes and scoring 2 points.

In February 2023, he won another title with Olympiakos, that of the Greek Cup in the Final 8 of Crete.

On January 16, 2024, Papas was released from Olympiacos and joined Promitheas Patras.

After starting the 2025–2026 campaign with Panionios, Papas was traded to Maroussi for Alexandros Nikolaidis on December 17, 2025.

== International career ==
On November 7, 2022, Papas was called up for the first time by Greece for the 2023 World Cup qualifiers against Latvia and Belgium, without making an appearance. He was called up again for the last two qualifiers on February. He made his debut against Serbia on February 24, 2023, using his full surname on his jersey (Papathanasiou). Three days later against Latvia he scored his first points. A three-point shot.

== Career statistics ==
Legend
GP	Games played	GS	Games started	MPG	Minutes per game
FG%	Field-goal percentage	3P%	3-point field-goal percentage	FT%	Free-throw percentage
RPG	Rebounds per game	APG	Assists per game	SPG	Steals per game
BPG	Blocks per game	PPG	Points per game	PIR	Performance index rating
**Bold**	Career high

=== EuroLeague ===
Year	Team	GP	GS	MPG	FG%	3P%	FT%	RPG	APG	SPG	BPG	PPG	PIR
2022–23	Olympiacos	**2**	0	**3.0**	**.500**	**1.000**	**1.000**	**.5**	—	—	—	**3.5**	**3.0**
2023–24	Olympiacos	**2**	0	**3.0**	.333	.000	—	—	—	—	—	1.0	0.0
Career		4	0	3.0	.429	.333	1.000	.3	—	—	—	2.3	1.5
