= Matthieu Gauzin =

French basketball player

Coviran Granada
- Position: Point guard
- League: Primera FEB

Personal information
- Born: 27 February 2001 (age 25) Saint-Doulchard, France
- Listed height: 1.92 m (6 ft 4 in)
- Listed weight: 73 kg (161 lb)

Career information
- Playing career: 2019–present

Career history
- 2019–2022: Le Mans
- 2020–2021: →Champagne-Reims
- 2022–2023: Gravelines-Dunkerque
- 2023–2024: Metropolitans 92
- 2024–2025: SLUC Nancy
- 2025: Tofaş
- 2026–present: Granada
Medals
Men's basketball
Representing France
FIBA Under-17 World Cup
| Silver medal – second place | 2018 Argentina | Team |

Matthieu Gauzin (born 27 February 2001) is a French professional basketball player for Granada of the Spanish Primera FEB. He plays as a point guard.

== Early life and career ==
Gauzin grew up in Bourges and played tennis until he was eight years old. He started playing basketball with CJM Bourges and joined Le Mans Sarthe at age 15.

== Professional career ==
On 22 May 2019, Gauzin signed a three-year professional contract with Le Mans Sarthe of the LNB Pro A. He became the youngest player to sign with the club since Nicolas Batum. He made his senior debut in a 21 September loss to Boulazac, scoring four points in 16 minutes. On 27 November, he announced that he would not enter the 2020 NBA draft, despite being considered a potential second-round pick at the time, because he felt that he was "not ready." In 15 games in his first season, Gauzin averaged 1.5 points per game.

On 3 June 2020, Gauzin was loaned to Champagne Châlons-Reims of the Pro A for the following season.

On May 31, 2022, he has signed with BCM Gravelines-Dunkerque of the LNB Pro A.

On October 2, 2023, he signed a one month contract with Metropolitans 92 of the French LNB Pro A, on October 20, his contract was extended until end of the season.

On May 20, 2024, he signed with SLUC Nancy Basket of the LNB Pro A.

On January 7, 2025, he signed with Tofaş of Basketbol Süper Ligi (BSL).

== National team career ==
Gauzin represented France at the 2018 FIBA Under-17 Basketball World Cup in Argentina, averaging eight points per game in a bench role and helping his team win the silver medal. At the 2019 FIBA U18 European Championship in Volos, Greece, he averaged 10.7 points and 2.8 steals per game, helping France to a fifth-place finish.
