= Mustapha Amzil =

Finnish basketball player (born 2001)

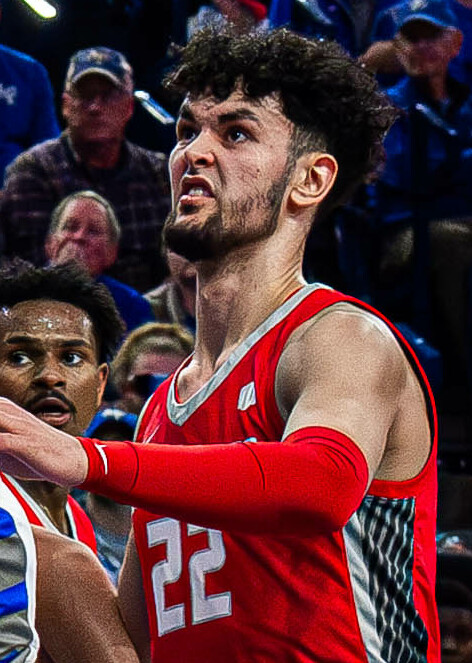
- Amzil with New Mexico Lobos in 2024

No. 22 – Yukatel Denizli Basket
- Position: Power forward
- League: Basketbol Süper Ligi

Personal information
- Born: September 12, 2001 (age 25) Kotka, Finland
- Listed height: 2.08 m (6 ft 10 in)
- Listed weight: 96 kg (212 lb)

Career information
- High school: Helsinki Basketball Academy, (Helsinki, Finland)
- College: Dayton (2020–2023); New Mexico (2023–2025)
- NBA draft: 2025: undrafted
- Playing career: 2016–present

Career history
- 2016–2017: KTP Basket
- 2017–2020: HBA-Märsky
- 2025–2026: Trepça
- 2026–present: Denizli Basket

Career highlights
- Kosovo League champion (2026); Kosovo Cup winner (2026); Kosovo Cup MVP (2026); Mountain West Sixth Man of the Year (2024); Atlantic 10 All-Rookie Team (2021)

Mustapha Amzil (born 12 September 2001) is a Finnish basketball player for Yukatel Denizli Basket of the Basketbol Süper Ligi (BSL).

== Early career ==
Born in Kotka, Amzil started to play basketball in a youth team of local club KTP Basket. He made his debut in Korisliiga, Finnish top-tier league, with KTP first team on 8 November 2016, becoming the youngest player ever to have played for the club's first team in the highest level. Amzil attended the Jordan Brand Classic -talent camp in Barcelona, Spain, in March 2017. He represented KTP until aged 15, when he joined Helsinki Basketball Academy team HBA-Märsky in 2017. During 2017–2020, Amzil played in the second-tier Koripallon I-divisioona with HBA.

== College career ==
In 2020, Amzil committed to Dayton and moved to United States to start college. In his rookie year in 2020–2021, Amzil was named three times the Rookie of the Week. At the end of the season, Amzil was named in the Atlantic 10 Conference All-Rookie Team. As a junior, he averaged 9.3 points and 4.8 rebounds per game.

After three seasons with Dayton, Amzil joined New Mexico in the summer 2023. On 12 March 2024, after his first season with New Mexico, Amzil was named the Sixth Man of the Year in the Mountain West Conference.

== Professional career ==
On 21 July 2025, Amzil returned to Europe and started his professional career after signing with Trepça in the Kosovo Superleague and FIBA Europe Cup. He played six games for Trepça in the Europe Cup and averaged 14.8 points and 7.4 rebounds. In February 2026, they won the Kosovo Cup and Amzil was named the MVP.

On August 28, 2026, he signed with Yukatel Denizli Basket of the Basketbol Süper Ligi (BSL).

== International career ==
Amzil has made 86 appearances in total for Finland under-16 and under-18 youth national teams.

He represented Finland in the postponed 2021 Summer Universiade competitions in Chengdu in the summer 2023. The team finished in 5th place, which is the best position in the nation's history. Amzil has made 10 appearances for Finland B national team.

He played his first games for the Finland national team in August 2025, in EuroBasket 2025 preparation games against Belgium and Poland, and has been part of the team during the 2027 FIBA World Cup qualifiers.

== Personal life ==
Born and raised in Finland, Amzil is of Moroccan descent on his father's side. Growing up, he played football for seven years before switching to basketball. His older sister Latifa Amzil is also a college basketball player for Detroit Mercy, and his younger brother Abdullah Amzil has played for Finland U16 and U18 national teams.

He is fluent in Finnish, Arabic and English.

== Career statistics ==
Legend
GP	Games played	GS	Games started	MPG	Minutes per game
FG%	Field goal percentage	3P%	3-point field goal percentage	FT%	Free throw percentage
RPG	Rebounds per game	APG	Assists per game	SPG	Steals per game
BPG	Blocks per game	PPG	Points per game	**Bold**	Career high

=== College ===
Year	Team	GP	GS	MPG	FG%	3P%	FT%	RPG	APG	SPG	BPG	PPG
2020–21	Dayton	19	15	**29.9**	**.496**	**.382**	.765	**5.6**	1.3	.7	.4	9.9
2021–22	Dayton	**35**	1	19.8	.399	.295	.725	4.1	.7	.2	.2	5.6
2022–23	Dayton	34	19	29.5	.442	.366	**.795**	4.8	**1.7**	.2	.3	9.3
2023–24	New Mexico	**35**	2	18.8	.403	.292	.771	3.5	.7	.6	.3	6.7
2024–25	New Mexico	32	**32**	28.7	.384	.289	.703	5.4	1.4	**.9**	**.7**	**11.1**
Career		155	69	24.8	.418	.321	.747	4.6	1.1	.5	.4	8.3
