= Lahti Basketball =

- Leagues: Korisliiga
- Founded: August 2015; 11 years ago
- Arena: Lahti Energia Arena
- Location: Lahti, Finland
- Head coach: Kristian Palotie
- Team captain: Erik Sajantila
- Website: lahtibasketball.fi
Home	Away

Lahti Basketball is a Finnish basketball club based in Lahti. It plays in the Korisliiga, the highest tier league in Finland. A phoenix club, the club was established in 2015 as a successor of Namika Lahti. Martin Mustonen and Kari Härkönen, also active with Namika, founded the club in August. Finnish international Vesa Mäkäläinen transferred from Namika to the new club.

In the 2018–19 season, Lahti Basketball promoted to the Finnish first tier Korisliiga.

== Former coaches ==
- (Finland) Pieti Poikola

== Notable players ==
- Zack Bryant
