= Portaria =

Portaria Πορταριά
- Municipal unit
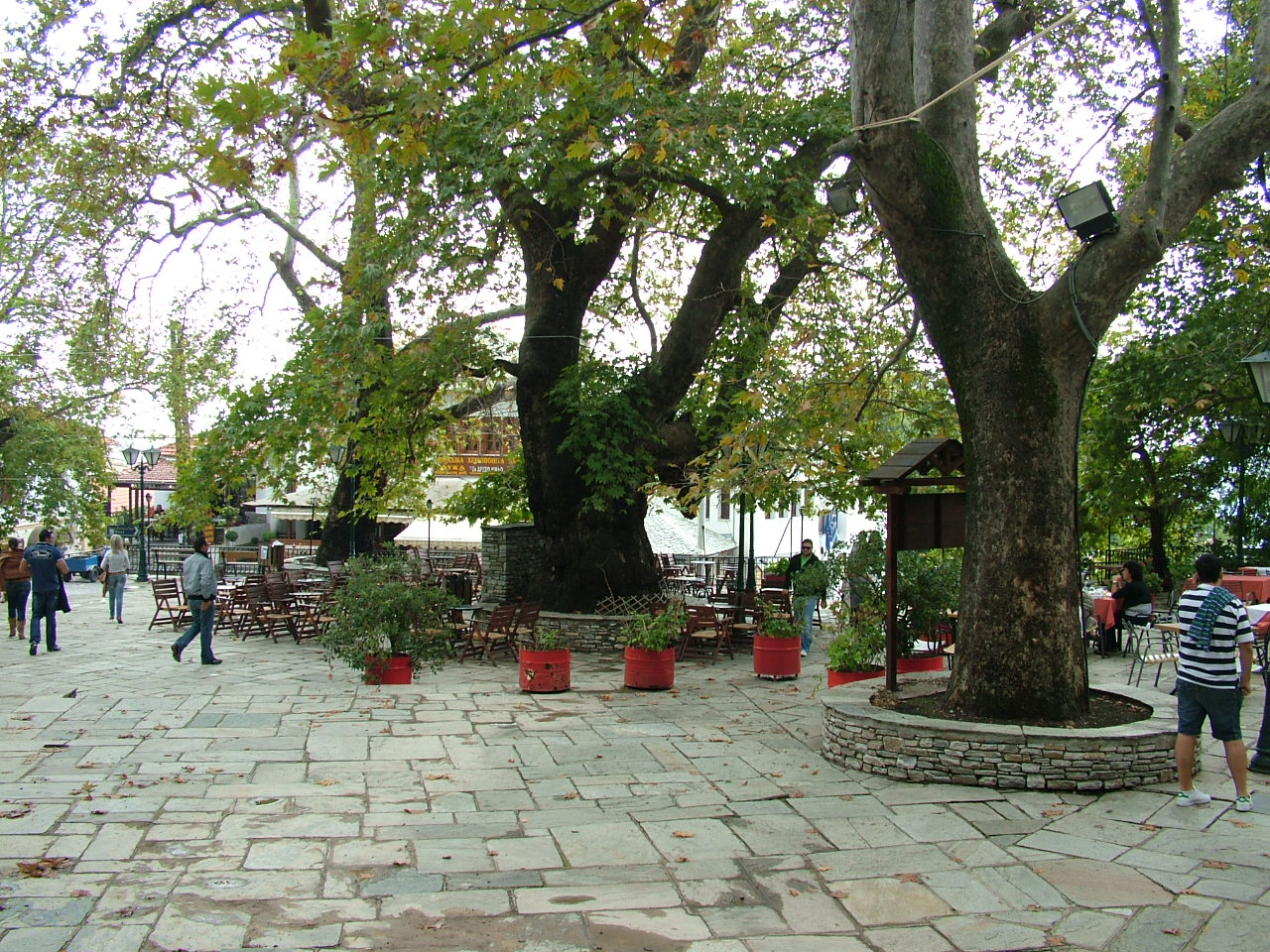
- Portaria square

- Location within the regional unit

- Location within Greece
- Coordinates: 39°23′N 23°0′E
- Country: Greece
- Administrative region: Thessaly
- Regional unit: Magnesia
- Municipality: Volos

Area
  - Municipal unit: 22.8 km^{2} (8.8 sq mi)
- Elevation: 600 m (2,000 ft)

Population (2021)
  - Municipal unit: 1,849
  - Municipal unit density: 81.1/km^{2} (210/sq mi)
  - Community: 496
- Time zone: UTC+2 (EET)
  - Summer (DST): UTC+3 (EEST)
- Postal code: 370 11
- Area code: 24280
- Vehicle registration: ΒΟ

Portaria (Greek: Πορταριά) is a village and a former municipality in Magnesia, Thessaly, Greece. Since the 2011 local government reform it is part of the municipality Volos, of which it is a municipal unit. The municipal unit has an area of 22.754 km^{2}. It is located on Mt. Pelion, facing the Pagasetic Gulf, north of Volos and its suburbs. The majority of the buildings are typical examples of Pelion architecture with their windows and doors decorated with a variety of colors. The mountaintop of Pelion is to the north. Portaria every year holds a traditional wedding in the main square of the village and many people from Volos and the surrounding villages drop by to learn how weddings were traditionally done in these villages.

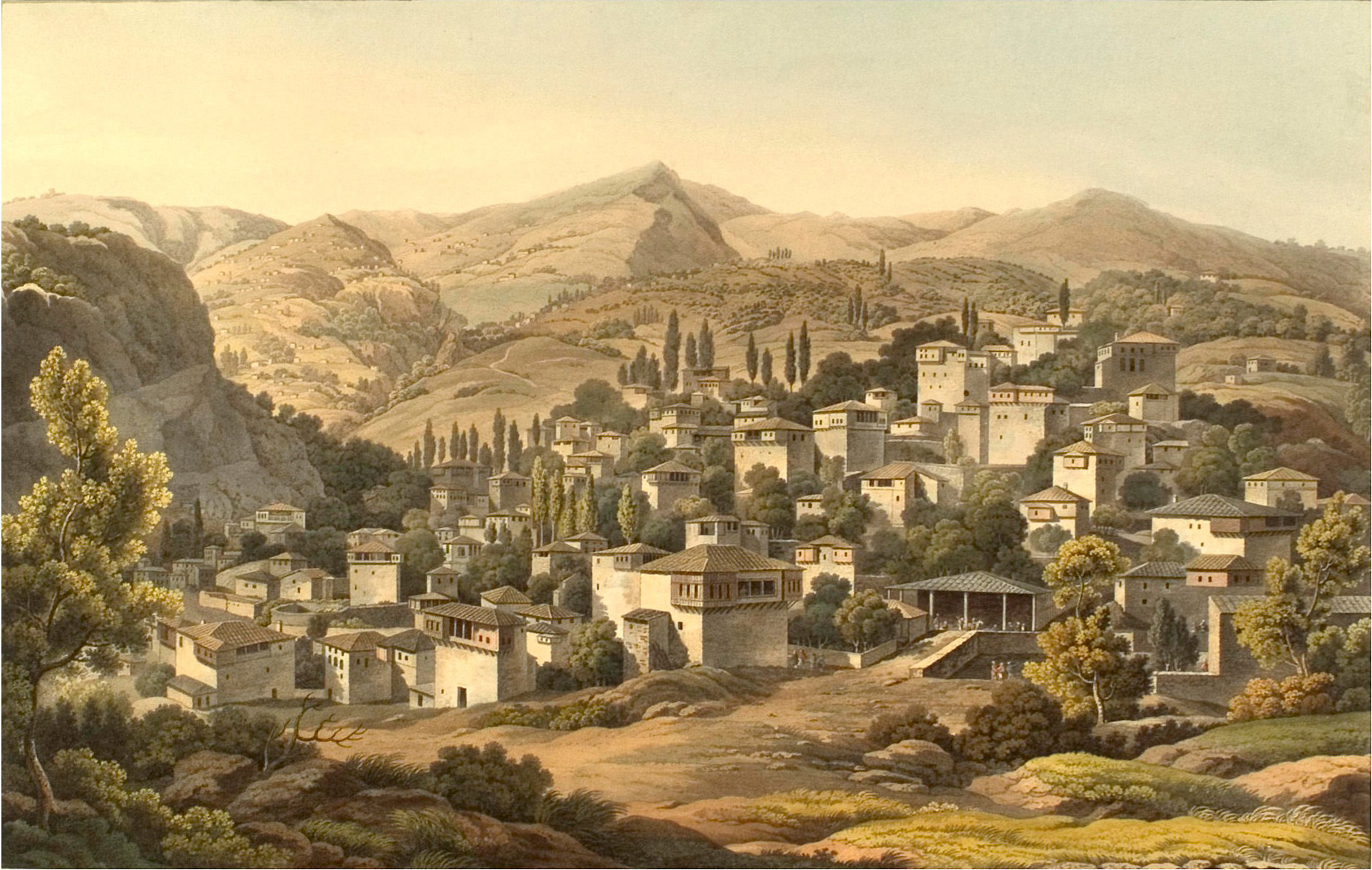
Portaria c.1820

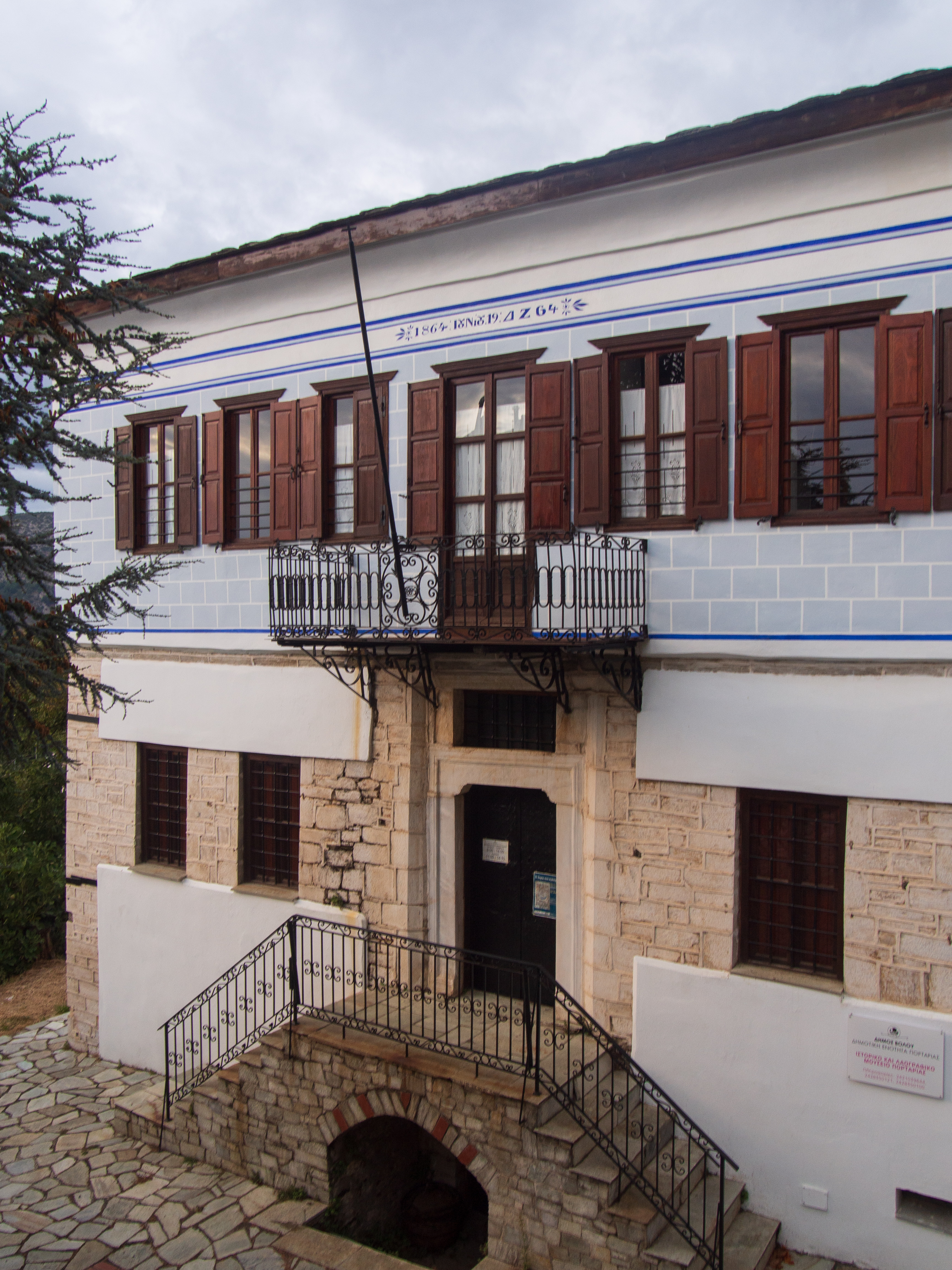
Zoulias mansion

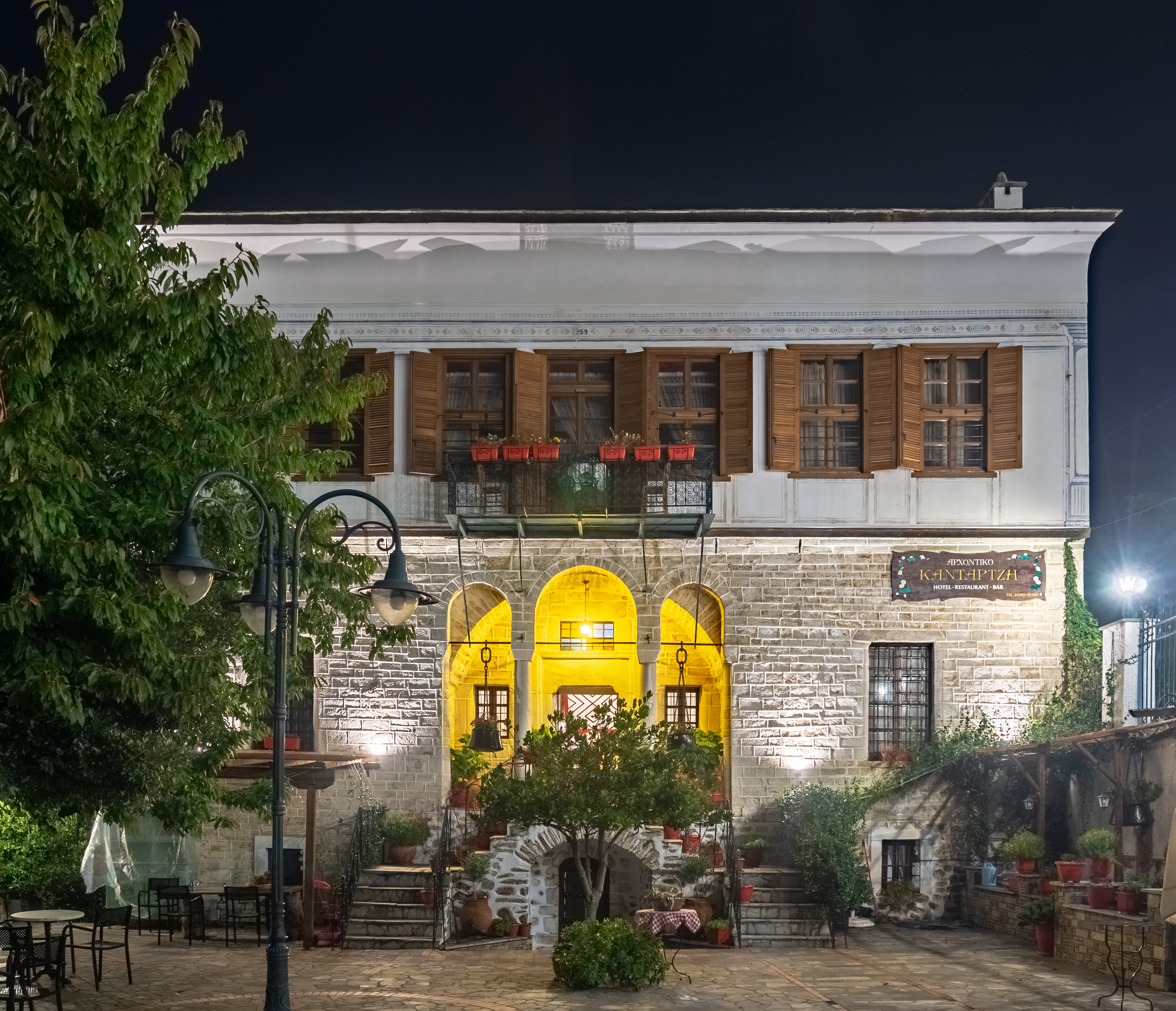
Katartzis mansion

== Historical population ==
Year	Community population	Municipal unit population
1981	769	-
1991	1,093	3,318
2001	1,327	3,201
2011	566	1,911
2021	496	1,849

== Sister cities ==
- Tourtour, France

== See also ==
- List of settlements in the Magnesia regional unit
