= Rok Nemanič =

Slovenian basketball player

No. 8 – Kansai Helios Domžale
- Position: Shooting guard / point guard
- League: Slovenian League

Personal information
- Born: December 28, 2001 (age 24) Ljubljana, Slovenia
- Listed height: 1.95 m (6 ft 5 in)

Career information
- Playing career: 2018–present

Career history
- 2018–2019: KOŠ Primorska
- 2019–2020: Koper Primorska
- 2019: → Slovan
- 2020–2023: Šentjur
- 2023-present: Kansai Helios Domžale

Career highlights
- Slovenian Cup winner (2020)
Medals
Men's basketball
Representing Slovenia
FIBA U18 European Championship
Bronze medal – third place	2019 Greece	Team

Rok Nemanič (born December 28, 2001) is a Slovenian professional basketball player. He is a 1.95m tall guard.

== Professional career ==
Nemanič started playing professional basketball for Koper Primorska.

In December 2020, He signed a multi-year contract with Šentjur.
