= Viktor Lakhin =

Russian basketball player (born 2001)

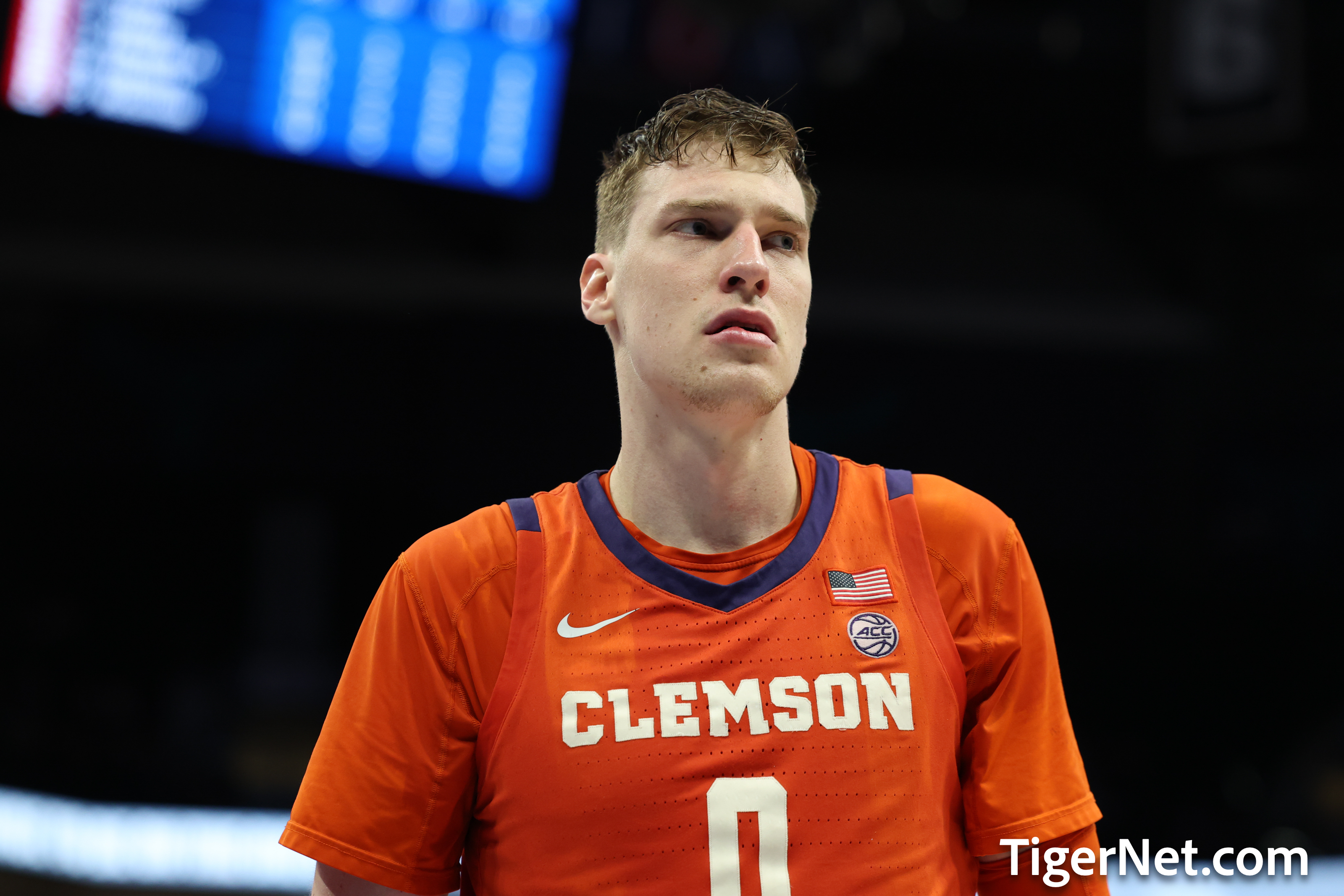

No. 0 – Stockton Kings
- Position: Center
- League: NBA G League

Personal information
- Born: July 30, 2001 (age 25) Anapa, Russia
- Listed height: 6 ft 11 in (2.11 m)
- Listed weight: 245 lb (111 kg)

Career information
- College: Cincinnati (2020–2024); Clemson (2024–2025)
- NBA draft: 2025: undrafted
- Playing career: 2025–present

Career history
- 2025–2026: Oklahoma City Blue
- 2026: Cangrejeros de Santurce
- 2026–present: Stockton Kings
- Stats at NBA.com
- Stats at Basketball Reference

Viktor Lakhin (born July 30, 2001), nicknamed “the Lakhin-ess Monster” is a Russian professional basketball player for the Stockton Kings of the NBA G League. He played college basketball for the Clemson Tigers and Cincinnati Bearcats.

== Early life ==
Lakhin was born in Russia, where he spent his youth years playing for the Russian U-18 National Team where he averaged 9.8 points and 7.0 rebounds while shooting 47.2 percent from the field. Ultimately, he decided to move to the United States to play college basketball for the Cincinnati Bearcats over other offers from Colorado, Colorado State, Ole Miss, St. John’s, Utah State, and Wake Forest.

== College career ==
=== Cincinnati ===
During his true freshman season in 2020-21, he missed the entirety of the season with a knee injury. On December 5, 2021, Lakhin totaled 13 points and 11 rebounds in a victory over Bryant. He finished the 2021-22 season, appearing in 29 games, where he averaged 4.2 points and 3.5 rebounds per game. During the 2022-23 season, Lakhin averaged 11.6 points, 7.1 rebounds, 1.4 blocks, and 1.2 steals per game. On November 12, 2023, Lakhin put up 26 points and 11 rebounds in a 85-73 victory versus Eastern Washington. In the 2023-24 season, he played in 29 games, where he averaged 9.2 points and 6.0 rebounds per game. After the conclusion of the 2023-24 season, Lakhin decided to enter his name into the NCAA transfer portal.

=== Clemson ===
Lakhin transferred to play for the Clemson Tigers. On February 8, 2025, he recorded 22 points in an upset win versus Duke. In the first round of the 2025 NCAA Division I men's basketball tournament, he recorded six points and ten rebounds before fouling out in a loss against McNeese. He finished his final collegiate season in 2024-25, playing in 34 games with 33 starts, averaging 11.4 points, 6.4 rebounds, 1.5 assists, 1.0 steal, and 1.5 blocks per game.

== Professional career ==
=== Oklahoma City Blue (2025–2026) ===
After not being selected in the 2025 NBA draft, Lakhin joined the Oklahoma City Thunder for NBA G League play but did not compete due to recovering from an injury. The Thunder signed Lakhin to their training camp roster before waiving him the next day, in order to add him to their G League affiliate the Oklahoma City Blue.

=== Cangrejeros de Santurce (2026) ===
On March 24, 2026, Lakhin signed a deal to play in Puerto Rico for Grammy Award-winning artist Bad Bunny's professional basketball team, the Cangrejeros de Santurce in the Baloncesto Superior Nacional. He joined former NBA sharpshooter Malik Beasley on the team. On May 6, 2026, he was released from the team to make space for former NBA player Chinanu Onuaku.

=== Stockton Kings (2026—present) ===
Lakhin was released by the Sacramento Kings on October 18, 2026.
