= Luc Van Slooten =

German basketball player (born 2002)

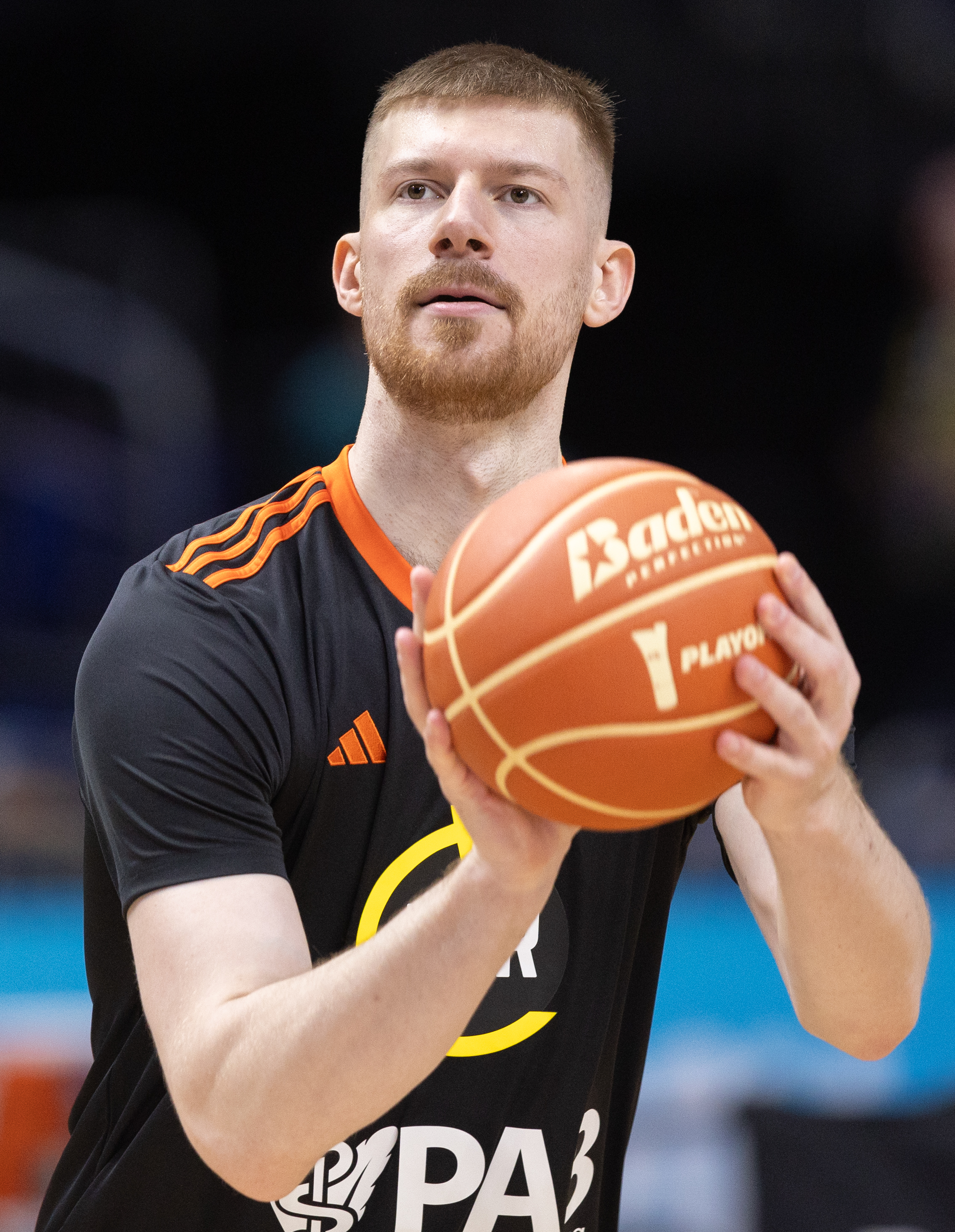
- Van Slooten in 2026

No. 11 – Crailsheim Merlins
- Position: Power forward
- League: ProA

Personal information
- Born: April 17, 2002 (age 24) Vechta, Germany
- Listed height: 2.02 m (6 ft 8 in)
- Listed weight: 96 kg (212 lb)

Career information
- Playing career: 2018–present

Career history
- 2018–2020: Rasta Vechta
- 2020–2023: Löwen Braunschweig
- 2023–2026: Rasta Vechta
- 2026–present: Crailsheim Merlins

Luc David Van Slooten (born April 17, 2002) is a German professional basketball player for Crailsheim Merlins of the German ProA. He plays the power forward position, and was considered one of Europe's top prospects at his age group.

== Early life and career ==
Van Slooten was born in Vechta, Germany to Birgit and André Van Slooten. He began playing basketball at the youth levels with TSV Quakenbrück. In the 2015–16 season, Van Slooten drew attention with Young Rasta Dragons, the youth team for German club Rasta Vechta that competed in the Jugend Basketball Bundesliga (JBBL), an under-16 league. Despite being 14 years old at the time, he averaged 14.2 points, 7.3 rebounds and 2.6 assists.

In the following season, Van Slooten was a top player for Young Rasta Dragons. In his 2016–17 campaign, he averaged 24.7 points, 8.7 rebounds, 2.6 assists, 3.4 steals and 2 blocks per game. He was named Most Valuable Player (MVP) and Rookie of the Year of the JBBL, becoming the first player in league history to win both awards in the same season. Basketball website Eurobasket.com also named Van Slooten as Most Improved Player and Newcomer of the Year in the Regionalliga North, a part of the fourth-tier German league.

Van Slooten continued his JBBL success into the 2017–18 season. In February 2018, he posted 32 points, 8 rebounds, and 9 assists in a 98–62 win over Junior Löwen Braunschweig. In addition, Van Slooten took part in the Nachwuchs Basketball Bundesliga (NBBL), the under-19 league. He also debuted in the ProA, the second-tier German league, averaging 1.5 points, 1.1 rebounds, and 0.5 assists in 8.8 minutes per game through 17 games. Van Slooten scored a season-high 7 points on March 10, 2018, in a 104–65 victory over Phoenix Hagen. In February 2018, he was loaned to Bayern Munich for the Munich qualifying tournament in the Adidas Next Generation Tournament.

== Professional career ==
On July 25, 2018, Van Slooten signed his first professional contract with Rasta Vechta. Van Slooten scored a season-high 11 points against Merlins Crailsheim. He left Vechta on August 3, 2020, to move to fellow Bundesliga side Basketball Löwen Braunschweig.

On August August 10, 2023, he signed with Rasta Vechta of the German Bundesliga for a second stint.

== National team career ==
Van Slooten debuted for Germany at the 2016 FIBA Europe Under-16 Championship, averaging 5.8 points, 1.2 rebounds, and 0.4 assists. At age 14, he was the youngest player at the tournament. Van Slooten scored a game-winning three-pointer at the buzzer against Serbia. At the 2017 FIBA Europe Under-16 Championship, when he was 15 years old, he assumed a leading role for the German team, averaging 10.4 points, 4.4 rebounds, 2.6 assists, and 2.6 steals. Van Slooten also appeared at the 2018 FIBA Europe Under-16 Championship, where he averaged 10.6 points, 5.9 rebounds, 2 assists, and 2.6 steals per game. He led Germany to a gold medal at the 2018 Albert Schweitzer Tournament, averaging 6.9 points per game.
