= Andrej Stavrov =

Slovenian basketball player

No. 9 – Krka
- Position: Shooting guard / point guard
- League: Slovenian League; ABA League First Division

Personal information
- Born: April 8, 2001 (age 25) Kranj, Slovenia
- Listed height: 2 m (6 ft 7 in)

Career information
- Playing career: 2017–present

Career history
- 2017–2021: Triglav Kranj
- 2021-present: Krka
Medals
Men's basketball
Representing Slovenia
FIBA U18 European Championship
| Bronze medal – third place | 2019 Greece | Team |

Andrej Stavrov (born April 8, 2001, in Kranj, Slovenia) is a Slovenian professional basketball player for Krka of the Slovenian League. He is a 2 m tall guard.

== Professional career ==
Stavrov started playing professional basketball for Triglav Kranj.

In August 2021, Stavrov signed a contract with the Krka.
