= Bine Prepelič =

Slovenian basketball player

No. 34 – Leuven Bears
- Position: Power forward
- League: BNXT League

Personal information
- Born: 5 August 2001 (age 25) Maribor, Slovenia
- Listed height: 2.00 m (6 ft 7 in)

Career information
- NBA draft: 2023: undrafted
- Playing career: 2019–present

Career history
- 2016–2018: Bistrica
- 2018–2019: Škofja Loka
- 2019: →Ilirija
- 2019–2022: Helios Suns
- 2022–2024: Spirou
- 2024–2025: Cedevita Olimpija
- 2025: Ilirija
- 2025–2026: CB Zamora
- 2026–present: Leuven Bears

Career highlights
- Slovenian League champion (2025); Slovenian Cup winner (2025); Slovenian Cup MVP (2025)
Medals
Men's basketball
Representing Slovenia
FIBA U18 European Championship
Bronze medal – third place	2019 Greece	Team

Bine Prepelič (born 5 August 2001) is a Slovenian professional basketball player for the Leuven Bears of the BNXT League. He is a 2.00 m tall power forward.

== Youth career ==
Prepelič started playing basketball for Bistrica in 2016 where he stayed for two seasons. In 2018, he joined Škofja Loka and was loaned to Ilirija during the season.

== Professional career ==
=== Helios Suns (2019–2022) ===
In October 2019, Prepelič signed a three-year contract with the Helios Suns, which was his first professional contract.

=== Spirou (2022–2024) ===
On 16 June 2022, he signed a contract with Spirou.

=== Cedevita Olimpija (2024–2025) ===
On 18 July 2024, he signed a two-year contract with KK Cedevita Olimpija of the Slovenian Basketball League and ABA League. On 16 June 2025, he parted ways with the club after one season.

=== Ilirija (2025) ===
On 8 September 2025, he signed for Ilirija of the Slovenian Basketball League and ABA League.

=== CB Zamora (2025–2026) ===
In December 2025, he signed for CB Zamora of the Spanish Primera FEB.

=== Leuven Bears (2026–present) ===
On September 4, 2026, he signed with Leuven Bears of the BNXT League.

== Slovenian national team ==
Prepelič made his debut for the Slovenian national team on November 11, 2022, at the 2023 FIBA Basketball World Cup qualification game against the Israel national team.
