= Basketball at the 2021 Summer World University Games – Men's tournament =

Men's basketball at the Chengdu 2021 FISU World University Games
- Venue: various
- Dates: 29 July–6 August
- Teams: 15

Medalists
1st place, gold medalist(s)		Czech Republic
2nd place, silver medalist(s)		Brazil
3rd place, bronze medalist(s)		United States

The men's tournament in basketball at the 2021 Summer Universiade in Chengdu, China was held from 29 July to 6 August.

== Preliminary round ==
Qualified for the Final eight
Qualified for the Placement 9th–16th

=== Pool A ===
Team	Pld	W	L	PF	PA	PD	Pts
Brazil	3	3	0	291	217	+74	6
Lithuania	3	2	1	257	221	+36	5
Chinese Taipei	3	1	2	227	302	−75	4
China	3	0	3	230	265	−35	3

29 July 2023
19:30 UTC+8

Boxscore

Lithuania	100–70	Chinese Taipei
Scoring by quarter: 32–18, 19–24, 25–13, 24–15

Fenghuangshan Sports Park Gymnasium

29 July 2023
19:30 UTC+8

Boxscore

China	79–89	Brazil
Scoring by quarter: 17–20, 26–20, 16–22, 20–27

Sichuan Gymnasium

30 July 2023
15:00 UTC+8

Boxscore

Brazil	118–60	Chinese Taipei
Scoring by quarter: 28–19, 22–13, 31–11, 37–17

Sichuan Gymnasium

30 July 2023
19:30 UTC+8

Boxscore

China	67–79	Lithuania
Scoring by quarter: 14–23, 10–19, 22–17, 21–20

Fenghuangshan Sports Park Gymnasium

31 July 2023
19:30 UTC+8

Boxscore

Lithuania	78–84	Brazil
Scoring by quarter: 17–18, 24–21, 9–21, 28–24

Qingshuihe Campus Gymnasium

31 July 2023
19:30 UTC+8

Boxscore

Chinese Taipei	97–84	China
Scoring by quarter: 20–26, 26–22, 30–18, 21–18

Qingbaijiang Sports Centre Gymnasium

=== Pool B ===
Team	Pld	W	L	PF	PA	PD	Pts
Argentina	3	3	0	261	163	+98	6
Romania	3	2	1	228	165	+63	5
Mongolia	3	1	2	207	218	−11	4
South Africa	3	0	3	117	267	−150	3

29 July 2023
11:00 UTC+8

Boxscore

Romania	81–62	Mongolia
Scoring by quarter: 20–9, 17–17, 19–16, 25–20

Qingshuihe Campus Gymnasium

29 July 2023
15:30 UTC+8

Boxscore

Argentina	102–36	South Africa
Scoring by quarter: 29–6, 27–12, 23–12, 23–6

Qingshuihe Campus Gymnasium

30 July 2023
11:00 UTC+8

Boxscore

Romania	56–70	Argentina
Scoring by quarter: 16–19, 16–13, 13–19, 11–19

Fenghuangshan Sports Park Gymnasium

30 July 2023
19:30 UTC+8

Boxscore

Mongolia	74–48	South Africa
Scoring by quarter: 18–13, 24–13, 15–12, 17–10

Qingshuihe Campus Gymnasium

31 July 2023
15:00 UTC+8

Boxscore

Argentina	84–71	Mongolia
Scoring by quarter: 16–16, 25–19, 22–12, 26–24

Sichuan Gymnasium

31 July 2023
19:30 UTC+8

Boxscore

South Africa	33–91	Romania
Scoring by quarter: 12–27, 12–22, 2–20, 7–22

Sichuan Gymnasium

=== Pool C ===
Team	Pld	W	L	PF	PA	PD	Pts
United States	3	3	0	265	210	+55	6
Czech Republic	3	2	1	237	200	+37	5
Poland	3	1	2	219	234	−15	4
Japan	3	0	3	161	238	−77	3

29 July 2023
11:00 UTC+8

Boxscore

Japan	56–76	Czech Republic
Scoring by quarter: 15–21, 11–17, 8–23, 22–15

Qingbaijiang Sports Centre Gymnasium

29 July 2023
15:00 UTC+8

Boxscore

United States	96–82	Poland
Scoring by quarter: 33–18, 26–21, 18–16, 19–27

Qingbaijiang Sports Centre Gymnasium

30 July 2023
11:00 UTC+8

Boxscore

Poland	68–89	Czech Republic
Scoring by quarter: 18–26, 12–29, 16–10, 22–24

Sichuan Gymnasium

30 July 2023
11:00 UTC+8

Boxscore

United States	93–56	Japan
Scoring by quarter: 30–17, 19–12, 31–10, 13–17

Qingbaijiang Sports Centre Gymnasium

31 July 2023
15:00 UTC+8

Boxscore

Japan	49–69	Poland
Scoring by quarter: 13–18, 13–13, 3–19, 20–19

Fenghuangshan Sports Park Gymnasium

31 July 2023
19:30 UTC+8

Boxscore

Czech Republic	72–76	United States
Scoring by quarter: 9–20, 21–12, 21–18, 21–26

Fenghuangshan Sports Park Gymnasium

=== Pool D ===
Team	Pld	W	L	PF	PA	PD	Pts
Finland	2	2	0	185	99	+86	4
South Korea	2	1	1	121	126	−5	3
Azerbaijan	2	0	2	89	170	−81	2

29 July 2023
11:00 UTC+8

Boxscore

Finland	105–43	Azerbaijan
Scoring by quarter: 31–7, 22–12, 23–14, 29–10

Sichuan Gymnasium

30 July 2023
19:30 UTC+8

Boxscore

South Korea	56–80	Finland
Scoring by quarter: 9–17, 15–16, 17–24, 15–23

Qingbaijiang Sports Centre Gymnasium

31 July 2023
15:00 UTC+8

Boxscore

Azerbaijan	46–65	South Korea
Scoring by quarter: 9–17, 12–13, 13–14, 12–21

Qingshuihe Campus Gymnasium

== 9th to 15th place classification ==
=== Bracket ===
9–15th place quarterfinals
C3	Poland
Bye
A3	Chinese Taipei	102
B4	South Africa	64
D3	Azerbaijan	48
C4	Japan	104
B3	Mongolia	71
A4	China	75

9–12th place semifinals
Poland	85
Chinese Taipei	82
Japan	62
China	84

9th place
Poland	87
China	76
11th place
Chinese Taipei	84
Japan	82

=== 9–15th place quarterfinals ===
2 August 2023
15:00 UTC+8

Boxscore

Japan	104–48	Azerbaijan
Scoring by quarter: 31–8, 19–12, 25–20, 29–8

Qingbaijiang Sports Centre Gymnasium

2 August 2023
19:30 UTC+8

Boxscore

Chinese Taipei	102–64	South Africa
Scoring by quarter: 25–14, 21–19, 18–16, 38–15

Qingshuihe Campus Gymnasium

2 August 2023
19:30 UTC+8

Boxscore

China	75–71	Mongolia
Scoring by quarter: 26–18, 6–14, 18–17, 25–22

Qingbaijiang Sports Centre Gymnasium

=== 13–15th place classification ===
Pos	Team	Pld	W	L	PF	PA	PD	Pts
13	Mongolia	2	2	0	147	114	+33	4
14	Azerbaijan	2	1	1	144	127	+17	3
15	South Africa	2	0	2	121	171	−50	2

3 August 2023
15:00 UTC+8

Boxscore

South Africa	62–79	Mongolia
Scoring by quarter: 19–15, 11–21, 8–25, 24–18

Qingshuihe Campus Gymnasium

4 August 2023
15:00 UTC+8

Boxscore

Mongolia	68–52	Azerbaijan
Scoring by quarter: 12–8, 16–12, 14–12, 26–20

Qingshuihe Campus Gymnasium

6 August 2023
11:00 UTC+8

Boxscore

Azerbaijan	92–59	South Africa
Scoring by quarter: 16–12, 27–18, 29–17, 20–12

Qingshuihe Campus Gymnasium

=== 9–12th place semifinals ===
3 August 2023
15:30 UTC+8

Boxscore

Chinese Taipei	82–85	Poland
Scoring by quarter: 25–26, 19–20, 22–20, 16–19

Sichuan Gymnasium

4 August 2023
19:30 UTC+8

Boxscore

Japan	62–84	China
Scoring by quarter: 14–16, 23–25, 12–22, 13–21

Qingshuihe Campus Gymnasium

=== 11th place game ===
6 August 2023
15:00 UTC+8

Boxscore

Chinese Taipei	84–82	Japan
Scoring by quarter: 27–22, 21–17, 18–18, 18–25

Qingshuihe Campus Gymnasium

=== 9th place game ===
6 August 2023
11:00 UTC+8

Boxscore

Poland	87–76	China
Scoring by quarter: 16–20, 26–21, 27–12, 18–23

Sichuan Gymnasium

== 1st to 8th place classification ==
=== Bracket ===
5th place
Romania	61
Finland	76
7th place
South Korea	66
Lithuania	99

5–8th place semifinals
Romania	66
South Korea	55
Lithuania	69
Finland	84

Quarterfinals
A1	Brazil	84
B2	Romania	66
C1	United States	86
D2	South Korea	68
B1	Argentina	78
A2	Lithuania	75
D1	Finland	66
C2	Czech Republic	68

Semifinals
Brazil	95
United States	82
Argentina	68
Czech Republic	85

Gold medal match
Brazil
Czech Republic
Bronze medal match
United States	102
Argentina	91

=== Quarterfinals ===
2 August 2023
15:00 UTC+8

Boxscore

Brazil	84–66	Romania
Scoring by quarter: 15–20, 20–20, 24–10, 25–16

Fenghuangshan Sports Park Gymnasium

2 August 2023
15:00 UTC+8

Boxscore

Lithuania	75–78	Argentina
Scoring by quarter: 22–19, 18–12, 13–24, 22–23

Sichuan Gymnasium

2 August 2023
19:30 UTC+8

Boxscore

United States	86–68	South Korea
Scoring by quarter: 16–13, 24–17, 29–9, 17–29

Fenghuangshan Sports Park Gymnasium

2 August 2023
19:30 UTC+8

Boxscore

Czech Republic	68–66	Finland
Scoring by quarter: 15–19, 17–16, 14–13, 22–18

Sichuan Gymnasium

=== 5–8th place semifinals ===
4 August 2023
15:00 UTC+8

Boxscore

Romania	66–55	South Korea
Scoring by quarter: 10–15, 14–14, 22–10, 20–16

Sichuan Gymnasium

4 August 2023
19:30 UTC+8

Boxscore

Lithuania	69–84	Finland
Scoring by quarter: 19–20, 18–19, 18–22, 14–23

Sichuan Gymnasium

=== Semifinals ===
4 August 2023
15:00 UTC+8

Boxscore

Brazil	95–82	United States
Scoring by quarter: 26–20, 24–17, 20–24, 25–21

Fenghuangshan Sports Park Gymnasium

4 August 2023
19:30 UTC+8

Boxscore

Argentina	68–85	Czech Republic
Scoring by quarter: 10–23, 17–16, 18–23, 23–23

Fenghuangshan Sports Park Gymnasium

=== 7th place game ===
6 August 2023
15:00 UTC+8

Boxscore

South Korea	66–99	Lithuania
Scoring by quarter: 22–20, 21–27, 14–27, 9–25

Sichuan Gymnasium

=== 5th place game ===
6 August 2023
11:00 UTC+8

Boxscore

Romania	61–76	Finland
Scoring by quarter: 15–13, 19–24, 9–12, 18–27

Qingbaijiang Sports Centre Gymnasium

=== Bronze medal game ===
6 August 2023
15:00 UTC+8

Boxscore

United States	102–91	Argentina
Scoring by quarter: 29–30, 30–28, 20–12, 23–21

Fenghuangshan Sports Park Gymnasium

=== Gold medal game ===
6 August 2023
19:30 UTC+8

Boxscore

Brazil	67–69	Czech Republic
Scoring by quarter: 13–16, 21–18, 16–17, 17–18
Pts: Paulo Junior 17; Rebs: Victor da Silva 10; Asts: Paulo Junior 5		Pts: Zídek 24; Rebs: Zídek 9 Asts: Sýkora 4

Fenghuangshan Sports Park Gymnasium

== Final standings ==
Place	Team	Record
1st place, gold medalist(s)	Czech Republic	5–1
2nd place, silver medalist(s)	Brazil	5–1
3rd place, bronze medalist(s)	United States	5–1
4	Argentina	4–2
5	Finland	4–1
6	Romania	3–3
7	Lithuania	3–3
8	South Korea	1–4
9	Poland	3–2
10	China	2–4
11	Chinese Taipei	3–3
12	Japan	1–5
13	Mongolia	3–3
14	Azerbaijan	1–4
15	South Africa	0–6
