= 2024 FIBA U16 EuroBasket =

International youth basketball tournament

Tournament details
- Host country: Greece
- City: Heraklion
- Dates: 9–17 August 2024
- Teams: 16 (from 1 confederation)
- Venue(s): 2 (in 1 host city)

Final positions
- Champions: France (4th title)
- Runners-up: Spain
- Third place: Serbia
- Fourth place: Greece

Tournament statistics
- Games played: 56
- Attendance: 7,650 (137 per game)
- MVP: (France) Cameron Houindo
- Top scorer: (Turkey) Omer Kutluay (19.0 points per game)

Official website
- www.fiba.basketball

The 2024 FIBA U16 EuroBasket was the 36th edition of the European basketball championship for men's national under-16 teams. The tournament was played in Heraklion, Greece, from 9 to 17 August 2024.

== Participating teams ==
- Bulgaria ▲ (Runners-up, 2023 FIBA U16 European Championship Division B)
- Croatia ▲ (Winners, 2023 FIBA U16 European Championship Division B)
- Finland
- France
- Georgia ▲ (Third place, 2023 FIBA U16 European Championship Division B)
- Germany
- Greece
- Israel
- Italy
- Latvia
- Lithuania
- Poland
- Serbia
- Slovenia
- Spain
- Turkey

== First round ==
The draw of the first round was held on 6 February 2024 in Freising, Germany.

In the first round, the teams were drawn into four groups of four. All teams advanced to the playoffs.

All times are local (Eastern European Summer Time – UTC+3).

=== Group A ===
Pos	Team	Pld	W	L	PF	PA	PD	Pts
1	Spain	3	3	0	276	171	+105	6
2	Latvia	3	2	1	219	228	−9	5
3	Turkey	3	1	2	228	214	+14	4
4	Finland	3	0	3	167	277	−110	3

Source: FIBA

9 August 2024
18:30

Boxscore

Finland	53–123	Spain
Scoring by quarter: 20–23, 12–40, 15–32, 6–28
Pts: Sellman 13; Rebs: Haruna 7 Asts: Saivosalmi, Rentola 3		Pts: Merebashvili 20; Rebs: Grau 8 Asts: Sanchez 8

University of Crete Hall
Attendance: 45
Referees: Ivor Matejek (CZE), Josip Jurcevic (CRO), Gavin Williams (GBR)

9 August 2024
21:00

Boxscore

Latvia	90–85	Turkey
Scoring by quarter: 15–21, 25–22, 30–18, 20–24
Pts: Aizpurs 24; Rebs: Cerņevskis 8 Asts: Ozers 5		Pts: Ziyaettin 35; Rebs: Koyun, Ene 8 Asts: Ziyaettin, Ene 4

University of Crete Hall
Attendance: 40
Referees: Georgios Poursanidis (GRE), Edgard Ceccarelli (FRA), Jules Gaduel (FRA)

10 August 2024
16:00

Boxscore

Spain	89–59	Latvia
Scoring by quarter: 22–15, 18–7, 30–18, 19–19
Pts: Merebashvili 16; Rebs: Merebashvili 7 Asts: Carrasco 7		Pts: Grinvalds 18; Rebs: Aizpurs 5 Asts: Six players 2

Nea Alikarnassos Arena
Attendance: 85
Referees: Michal Proc (POL), Blaz Zupancic (SLO), Mladen Lucic (MNE)

10 August 2024
21:00

Boxscore

Turkey	84–60	Finland
Scoring by quarter: 22–20, 22–11, 18–17, 22–12
Pts: Kutluay 19; Rebs: Kas 12; Asts: Fenemen, Ziyaettin 5		Pts: Saivosalmi 17; Rebs: Schales 8 Asts: Manninen 5

Nea Alikarnassos Arena
Attendance: 30
Referees: Stylianos Simeonidis (GRE), Josip Jurcevic (CRO), Kirile Tvauri (GEO)

11 August 2024
16:00

Boxscore

Turkey	59–64	Spain
Scoring by quarter: 14–15, 11–17, 18–10, 16–22
Pts: Kutluay 19; Rebs: Koyun 7 Asts: Kutluay 3		Pts: Zurita 28; Rebs: Grau, Diallo 7 Asts: Sanchez 3

University of Crete Hall
Attendance: 75
Referees: Georgios Poursanidis (GRE), Josip Jurcevic (CRO), Stylianos Simeonidis (GRE)

11 August 2024
21:00

Boxscore

Finland	54–70	Latvia
Scoring by quarter: 16–22, 8–20, 14–16, 16–12
Pts: Laitinen 16; Rebs: Haruna 15; Asts: Hopkins, Sellman 3		Pts: Ozers 14; Rebs: Kudrjavcevs, Ozers 6 Asts: Kudrjavcevs 8

University of Crete Hall
Attendance: 30
Referees: Blaz Zupancic (SLO), Andrea Bongiorni (ITA), Michal Proc (POL)

=== Group B ===
Pos	Team	Pld	W	L	PF	PA	PD	Pts
1	Serbia	3	3	0	258	188	+70	6
2	Lithuania	3	2	1	230	170	+60	5
3	Germany	3	1	2	209	197	+12	4
4	Bulgaria	3	0	3	151	293	−142	3

Source: FIBA

9 August 2024
13:30

Boxscore

Bulgaria	40–97	Lithuania
Scoring by quarter: 12–30, 10–17, 11–30, 7–20
Pts: Castanier 13; Rebs: Gidov, Kyosev 7 Asts: Gidov 5		Pts: Aliukonis 16; Rebs: Stombergas 12; Asts: Prekevicius 7

University of Crete Hall
Attendance: 55
Referees: Blaz Zupancic (SLO), Zoran Mitrovski (MKD), Andrea Bongiorni (ITA)

9 August 2024
16:00

Boxscore

Germany	69–72	Serbia
Scoring by quarter: 18–25, 21–17, 21–11, 9–19
Pts: Klein 16; Rebs: Klein 13; Asts: Kayser 6		Pts: Bjelić 24; Rebs: Gavranović 13; Asts: Ivković 4

University of Crete Hall
Attendance: 70
Referees: Michal Proc (POL), Stylianos Simeonidis (GRE), Kirile Tvauri (GEO)

10 August 2024
13:30

Boxscore

Serbia	110–59	Bulgaria
Scoring by quarter: 33–6, 28–18, 18–30, 31–5
Pts: Danilović, Bjelić 17; Rebs: Zelić 13; Asts: Karalić 5		Pts: Castanier 12; Rebs: Todorov 7 Asts: Simeonov 6

Nea Alikarnassos Arena
Attendance: 60
Referees: Edgard Ceccarelli (FRA), Gavin Williams (GBR), Andrea Bongiorni (ITA)

10 August 2024
21:00

Boxscore

Lithuania	73–54	Germany
Scoring by quarter: 16–15, 27–13, 16–14, 14–12
Pts: Zibuda 20; Rebs: Stombergas 9 Asts: Prekevicius 5		Pts: Danziger, Kemmer 9 Rebs: Klein 9 Asts: Edoka, Kayser 3

University of Crete Hall
Attendance: 50
Referees: Georgios Poursanidis (GRE), Mehmet Sahin (TUR), Jules Gaduel (FRA)

11 August 2024
16:00

Boxscore

Bulgaria	52–86	Germany
Scoring by quarter: 17–23, 11–17, 11–19, 13–27
Pts: Popov, Kamenski 11; Rebs: Popov 5 Asts: Kyosev 4		Pts: Petric 23; Rebs: Edoka 9 Asts: Petric 4

Nea Alikarnassos Arena
Attendance: 76
Referees: Zoran Mitrovski (MKD), Jules Gaduel (FRA), Mladen Lucic (MNE)

11 August 2024
21:00

Boxscore

Serbia	76–60	Lithuania
Scoring by quarter: 15–15, 23–13, 20–12, 18–20
Pts: Bjelić 20; Rebs: Gavranović 12; Asts: Bikić 5		Pts: Prekevicius 12; Rebs: Stombergas 12; Asts: Ulanovas 4

Nea Alikarnassos Arena
Attendance: 100
Referees: Ivor Matejek (CZE), Kirile Tvauri (GEO), Edgard Ceccarelli (FRA)

=== Group C ===
Pos	Team	Pld	W	L	PF	PA	PD	Pts
1	France	3	3	0	247	164	+83	6
2	Slovenia	3	2	1	209	223	−14	5
3	Georgia	3	1	2	174	198	−24	4
4	Poland	3	0	3	177	222	−45	3

Source: FIBA

9 August 2024
13:30

Boxscore

Poland	66–81	Slovenia
Scoring by quarter: 14–20, 18–27, 15–23, 19–11
Pts: Losiak 12; Rebs: Losiak 7 Asts: Losiak, Berlinski 3		Pts: Joksimovic 20; Rebs: Joksimovic 8 Asts: Joksimovic 5

Nea Alikarnassos Arena
Attendance: 80
Referees: Juozas Barkauskas (LTU), Mehmet Sahin (TUR), Elias Anttonen (FIN)

9 August 2024
16:00

Boxscore

Georgia	49–74	France
Scoring by quarter: 17–17, 6–17, 14–14, 12–26
Pts: Khatiashvili 18; Rebs: Gigineishvili 6 Asts: Tchuadze 4		Pts: Houindo 13; Rebs: Houindo 13; Asts: Elouma 4

Nea Alikarnassos Arena
Attendance: 90
Referees: Mehmet Karabilecen (TUR), Mladen Lucic (MNE), Dimitar Georgiev (BUL)

10 August 2024
13:30

Boxscore

Slovenia	62–58	Georgia
Scoring by quarter: 18–13, 13–6, 19–19, 12–20
Pts: Joksimovic 19; Rebs: Ciperle 10; Asts: Bojovic 4		Pts: Suladze 20; Rebs: Kardava 13; Asts: Khatiashvili 5

University of Crete Hall
Attendance: 40
Referees: Ventsislav Velikov (BUL), Gintaras Vitkauskas (LTU), Alfonso Olivares Iglesias (ESP)

10 August 2024
16:00

Boxscore

France	74–49	Poland
Scoring by quarter: 27–12, 13–18, 18–11, 16–8
Pts: Kouame-Zeze 14; Rebs: Mahop 9 Asts: Mahop 5		Pts: Sularski 17; Rebs: Sularski 6 Asts: Sularski 6

University of Crete Hall
Attendance: 50
Referees: Sinisa Prpa (SRB), Ritvars Helmsteins (LAT), Armin Mutapcic (GER)

11 August 2024
13:30

Boxscore

Georgia	67–62	Poland
Scoring by quarter: 11–19, 21–17, 15–17, 20–9
Pts: Kardava 19; Rebs: Gigineishvili 8 Asts: Suladze 5		Pts: Losiak 26; Rebs: Sularski 7 Asts: Musialek 7

Nea Alikarnassos Arena
Attendance: 50
Referees: Mehmet Sahin (TUR), Armin Mutapcic (GER), Dimitar Georgiev (BUL)

11 August 2024
18:30

Boxscore

Slovenia	66–99	France
Scoring by quarter: 19–21, 17–25, 17–27, 13–26
Pts: Ciperle 16; Rebs: Ciperle 7 Asts: Cop 4		Pts: Gabriel des Bordes 16; Rebs: Letailleur 7 Asts: Mahop 7

University of Crete Hall
Attendance: 80
Referees: Mehmet Karabilecen (TUR), Gintaras Vitkauskas (LTU), Elias Anttonen (FIN)

=== Group D ===
Pos	Team	Pld	W	L	PF	PA	PD	Pts
1	Greece	3	3	0	220	175	+45	6
2	Israel	3	2	1	226	209	+17	5
3	Italy	3	1	2	208	204	+4	4
4	Croatia	3	0	3	195	261	−66	3

Source: FIBA

9 August 2024
18:30

Boxscore

Israel	59–78	Greece
Scoring by quarter: 15–20, 8–24, 16–10, 20–24
Pts: Aronov 16; Rebs: Hershko, Drori 6 Asts: Amiel 3		Pts: Chaidemenos, Chatzilamprou 16; Rebs: Asimenios 11; Asts: Asimenios 5

Nea Alikarnassos Arena
Attendance: 350
Referees: Sinisa Prpa (SRB), Ritvars Helmsteins (LAT), Alfonso Olivares Iglesias (ESP)

9 August 2024
21:00

Boxscore

Croatia	66–90	Italy
Scoring by quarter: 23–18, 15–17, 13–22, 15–33
Pts: Dorotic, Santro 14; Rebs: Dorotic 13; Asts: Graso, Vuckovic 5		Pts: Cattapan 25; Rebs: Acunzo 14; Asts: Livingston Jr, Di Meo 4

Nea Alikarnassos Arena
Attendance: 80
Referees: Ventsislav Velikov (BUL), Gintaras Vitkauskas (LTU), Armin Mutapcic (GER)

10 August 2024
18:30

Boxscore

Greece	77–63	Croatia
Scoring by quarter: 19–22, 17–14, 20–12, 21–15
Pts: Chatzilamprou 33; Rebs: Chatzilamprou 12; Asts: Venetidis, Chartonas 4		Pts: Santro 18; Rebs: Dorotic 9 Asts: Graso 4

Nea Alikarnassos Arena
Attendance: 476
Referees: Ivor Matejek (CZE), Juozas Barkauskas (LTU), Elias Anttonen (FIN)

10 August 2024
18:30

Boxscore

Italy	65–73	Israel
Scoring by quarter: 22–23, 17–12, 5–17, 21–21
Pts: Di Meo 12; Rebs: Cattapan, Acunzo 10; Asts: Cattapan 8		Pts: Aronov 28; Rebs: Azriel 11; Asts: Trushkin 4

University of Crete Hall
Attendance: 60
Referees: Mehmet Karabilecen (TUR), Zoran Mitrovski (MKD), Dimitar Georgiev (BUL)

11 August 2024
13:30

Boxscore

Croatia	66–94	Israel
Scoring by quarter: 17–25, 13–20, 17–28, 19–21
Pts: Dujakovic 16; Rebs: Garac 6 Asts: Graso 6		Pts: Amiel, Azriel 16; Rebs: Agami 11; Asts: Azriel 7

University of Crete Hall
Attendance: 50
Referees: Ventsislav Velikov (BUL), Alfonso Olivares Iglesias (ESP), Juozas Barkauskas (LTU)

11 August 2024
18:30

Boxscore

Greece	65–53	Italy
Scoring by quarter: 17–14, 13–17, 14–9, 21–13
Pts: Skliros 12; Rebs: Skliros, Thomakos 6 Asts: Chartonas 6		Pts: Livingston Jr 20; Rebs: Cattapan, Livingston Jr 5 Asts: Livingston Jr 3

Nea Alikarnassos Arena
Attendance: 250
Referees: Sinisa Prpa (SRB), Gavin Williams (GBR), Ritvars Helmsteins (LAT)

== Playoff brackets ==
=== Main bracket ===
Round of 16
13 August
A1 Spain	104
B4 Bulgaria	58
13 August
C2 Slovenia	69
D3 Italy	87
13 August
B2 Lithuania	68
A3 Turkey	77
13 August
D1 Greece	68
C4 Poland	55
13 August
A2 Latvia	75
B3 Germany	68
13 August
C1 France	90
D4 Croatia	59
13 August
B1 Serbia	95
A4 Finland	78
13 August
D2 Israel	94
C3 Georgia	59

Quarterfinals
14 August
Spain	76
Italy	69
14 August
Turkey	65
Greece	75
14 August
Latvia	41
France	66
14 August
Serbia	65
Israel	56

Semifinals
16 August
Spain	77
Greece	71
16 August
France	67
Serbia	60

Final
17 August
Spain	70
France	82
3rd place match
17 August
Greece	65
Serbia	74

=== 5th place bracket ===
5th–8th place semifinals
16 August
Italy	74
Turkey	62
16 August
Latvia	72
Israel	78

5th place match
17 August
Italy	86
Israel	63
7th place match
17 August
Turkey	77
Latvia	98

=== 9th place bracket ===
9th–16th place quarterfinals
14 August
Bulgaria	65
Slovenia	84
14 August
Lithuania	98
Poland	74
14 August
Germany	63
Croatia	61
14 August
Finland (OT)	78
Georgia	75

9th–12th place semifinals
16 August
Slovenia	74
Lithuania	97
16 August
Germany	95
Finland	62

9th place match
17 August
Lithuania	87
Germany	64
11th place match
17 August
Slovenia	79
Finland	82

=== 13th place bracket ===
13th–16th place semifinals
16 August
Bulgaria	66
Poland	87
16 August
Croatia	81
Georgia	90

13th place match
17 August
Poland	57
Georgia	75
15th place match
17 August
Bulgaria	82
Croatia	63

== Playoff results ==
=== Round of 16 ===
13 August 2024
13:30

Boxscore

Spain	104–58	Bulgaria
Scoring by quarter: 30–8, 24–19, 31–19, 19–12
Pts: Carrasco, Viguer 13; Rebs: Merebashvili, Diallo 10; Asts: Bermejo 6		Pts: Kovachev 15; Rebs: Slavov 4 Asts: Slavov 5

Nea Alikarnassos Arena
Attendance: 60
Referees: Edgard Ceccarelli (FRA), Ritvars Helmsteins (LAT), Elias Anttonen (FIN)

13 August 2024
13:30

Boxscore

Latvia	75–68	Germany
Scoring by quarter: 8–23, 25–12, 26–11, 16–22
Pts: Aizpurs 26; Rebs: Ozers 6 Asts: Kudrjavcevs 5		Pts: Kayser 20; Rebs: Aguebor 6 Asts: Drucke, Kayser 3

University of Crete Hall
Attendance: 75
Referees: Blaz Zupancic (SLO), Alfonso Olivares Iglesias (ESP), Gintaras Vitkauskas (LTU)

13 August 2024
16:00

Boxscore

France	90–59	Croatia
Scoring by quarter: 15–20, 26–19, 21–7, 28–13
Pts: Towo-Nansi 14; Rebs: Elouma 7 Asts: Towo-Nansi 10		Pts: Vuckovic 19; Rebs: Vuckovic, Zrilic 8 Asts: Dujakovic 4

University of Crete Hall
Attendance: 50
Referees: Georgios Poursanidis (GRE), Andrea Bongiorni (ITA), Stylianos Simeonidis (GRE)

13 August 2024
16:00

Boxscore

Slovenia	69–87	Italy
Scoring by quarter: 15–22, 13–26, 13–26, 28–13
Pts: Stjepanovic 22; Rebs: Jarc 7 Asts: Joksimovic, Stjepanovic 4		Pts: Cattapan 26; Rebs: Acunzo 12; Asts: Livingston Jr 6

Nea Alikarnassos Arena
Attendance: 60
Referees: Juozas Barkauskas (LTU), Armin Mutapcic (GER), Michal Proc (POL)

13 August 2024
18:30

Boxscore

Serbia	95–78	Finland
Scoring by quarter: 18–16, 26–24, 31–19, 20–19
Pts: Bjelić 30; Rebs: Bikić 9 Asts: Bikić 6		Pts: Saivosalmi, Haruna 17; Rebs: Three players 7 Asts: Saivosalmi 11

University of Crete Hall
Attendance: 40
Referees: Mehmet Karabilecen (TUR), Gavin Williams (GBR), Dimitar Georgiev (BUL)

13 August 2024
18:30

Boxscore

Greece	68–55	Poland
Scoring by quarter: 11–13, 24–16, 19–14, 14–12
Pts: Chatzilamprou 16; Rebs: Skliros 7 Asts: Tsonis 5		Pts: Sularski 20; Rebs: Folga 8 Asts: Sularski 7

Nea Alikarnassos Arena
Attendance: 325
Referees: Ivor Matejek (CZE), Zoran Mitrovski (MKD), Kirile Tvauri (GEO)

13 August 2024
21:00

Boxscore

Lithuania	68–77	Turkey
Scoring by quarter: 13–18, 14–25, 14–20, 27–14
Pts: Prekevicius 15; Rebs: Three players 6 Asts: Prekevicius 8		Pts: Kutluay 24; Rebs: Alyanak 12; Asts: Kutluay 8

Nea Alikarnassos Arena
Attendance: 110
Referees: Sinisa Prpa (SRB), Mladen Lucic (MNE), Jules Gaduel (FRA)

13 August 2024
21:00

Boxscore

Israel	94–59	Georgia
Scoring by quarter: 24–18, 29–13, 19–14, 22–14
Pts: Amiel 21; Rebs: Amiel 7 Asts: Amiel, Azriel 5		Pts: Tchuadze 14; Rebs: Khatiashvili 5 Asts: Khatiashvili 4

University of Crete Hall
Attendance: 40
Referees: Ventsislav Velikov (BUL), Josip Jurcevic (CRO), Mehmet Sahin (TUR)

=== 9th–16th place quarterfinals ===
14 August 2024
13:30

Boxscore

Bulgaria	65–84	Slovenia
Scoring by quarter: 19–22, 14–21, 19–17, 13–24
Pts: Kyosev 21; Rebs: Castanier 6 Asts: Vodenicharski 4		Pts: Joksimovic 23; Rebs: Joksimovic 11; Asts: Joksimovic 6

University of Crete Hall
Attendance: 40
Referees: Ivor Matejek (CZE), Elias Anttonen (FIN), Kirile Tvauri (GEO)

14 August 2024
16:00

Boxscore

Germany	63–61	Croatia
Scoring by quarter: 15–9, 15–11, 14–21, 19–20
Pts: Edoka 20; Rebs: Danziger 8 Asts: Edoka 3		Pts: Santro 21; Rebs: Dorotic 9 Asts: Graso 7

University of Crete Hall
Attendance: 30
Referees: Juozas Barkauskas (LTU), Jules Gaduel (FRA), Andrea Bongiorni (ITA)

14 August 2024
18:30

Boxscore

Lithuania	98–74	Poland
Scoring by quarter: 22–15, 30–16, 22–25, 24–18
Pts: Linartas 18; Rebs: Stombergas 9 Asts: Cerneckis 6		Pts: Sularski 24; Rebs: Borucinski-Hrycyk 11; Asts: Three players 4

University of Crete Hall
Attendance: 40
Referees: Georgios Poursanidis (GRE), Alfonso Olivares Iglesias (ESP), Mladen Lucic (MNE)

14 August 2024
21:00

Boxscore

Finland	78–75 (OT)	Georgia
Scoring by quarter: 20–11, 15–21, 17–21, 16–15, Overtime: 10–7
Pts: Passila 22; Rebs: Sellman 13; Asts: Manninen, Passila 4		Pts: Khatiashvili 24; Rebs: Suladze 13; Asts: Khatiashvili 8

University of Crete Hall
Attendance: 30
Referees: Sinisa Prpa (SRB), Zoran Mitrovski (MKD), Dimitar Georgiev (BUL)

=== 13th–16th place semifinals ===
16 August 2024
13:30

Boxscore

Bulgaria	66–87	Poland
Scoring by quarter: 11–24, 22–13, 22–23, 11–27
Pts: Popov 12; Rebs: Tanev 7 Asts: Kyosev 7		Pts: Bloch 17; Rebs: Nagel 10; Asts: Musialek 5

University of Crete Hall
Attendance: 35
Referees: Juozas Barkauskas (LTU), Sinisa Prpa (SRB), Stylianos Simeonidis (GRE)

16 August 2024
16:00

Boxscore

Croatia	81–90	Georgia
Scoring by quarter: 26–17, 20–29, 14–15, 21–29
Pts: Vuckovic 26; Rebs: Dorotic 10; Asts: Graso 5		Pts: Kavlashvili 28; Rebs: Dokhnadze, Khatiashvili 8 Asts: Khatiashvili 6

University of Crete Hall
Attendance: 30
Referees: Mehmet Karabilecen (TUR), Alfonso Olivares Iglesias (ESP), Edgard Ceccarelli (FRA)

=== 15th place match ===
17 August 2024
11:00

Boxscore

Bulgaria	82–63	Croatia
Scoring by quarter: 26–23, 27–10, 15–16, 14–14
Pts: Slavov 25; Rebs: Slavov, Kyosev 10; Asts: Kyosev 6		Pts: Vuckovic 24; Rebs: Santro 6 Asts: Graso 6

University of Crete Hall
Attendance: 30
Referees: Armin Mutapcic (GER), Jules Gaduel (FRA), Andrea Bongiorni (ITA)

=== 13th place match ===
17 August 2024
16:00

Boxscore

Poland	57–75	Georgia
Scoring by quarter: 20–18, 12–17, 14–14, 11–26
Pts: Sularski 18; Rebs: Folga 6 Asts: Losiak, Sularski 5		Pts: Khatiashvili 28; Rebs: Khatiashvili 13; Asts: Zhgenti 5

Nea Alikarnassos Arena
Attendance: 50
Referees: Ivor Matejek (CZE), Blaz Zupancic (SLO), Josip Jurcevic (CRO)

=== 9th–12th place semifinals ===
16 August 2024
18:30

Boxscore

Slovenia	74–97	Lithuania
Scoring by quarter: 14–25, 16–21, 22–30, 22–21
Pts: Joksimovic 17; Rebs: Ciperle 5 Asts: Joksimovic, Stjepanovic 4		Pts: Jakstonis, Zilinskas 19; Rebs: Jakstonis 13; Asts: Prekevicius 7

University of Crete Hall
Attendance: 50
Referees: Georgios Poursanidis (GRE), Gavin Williams (GBR), Dimitar Georgiev (BUL)

16 August 2024
21:00

Boxscore

Germany	95–62	Finland
Scoring by quarter: 27–25, 26–10, 25–19, 17–8
Pts: Kemmer 16; Rebs: Klein 8 Asts: Edoka 6		Pts: Saivosalmi 19; Rebs: Sellman 6 Asts: Manninen 7

University of Crete Hall
Attendance: 35
Referees: Mehmet Sahin (TUR), Mladen Lucic (MNE), Andrea Bongiorni (ITA)

=== 11th place match ===
17 August 2024
13:30

Boxscore

Slovenia	79–82	Finland
Scoring by quarter: 10–27, 20–26, 27–14, 22–15
Pts: Joksimovic 21; Rebs: Karisik 13; Asts: Stjepanovic, Porenta 4		Pts: Saivosalmi 26; Rebs: Passila 9 Asts: Saivosalmi 7

University of Crete Hall
Attendance: 30
Referees: Alfonso Olivares Iglesias (ESP), Mladen Lucic (MNE), Dimitar Georgiev (BUL)

=== 9th place match ===
17 August 2024
16:00

Boxscore

Lithuania	87–64	Germany
Scoring by quarter: 23–13, 27–15, 14–24, 23–12
Pts: Zibuda 16; Rebs: Jakstonis 8 Asts: Prekevicius, Ulanovas 7		Pts: Edoka 18; Rebs: Edoka 8 Asts: Klaric, Drucke 4

University of Crete Hall
Attendance: 40
Referees: Mehmet Sahin (TUR), Stylianos Simeonidis (GRE), Elias Anttonen (FIN)

=== Championship quarterfinals ===
14 August 2024
13:30

Boxscore

Spain	76–69	Italy
Scoring by quarter: 21–7, 22–21, 15–14, 18–27
Pts: Viguer 15; Rebs: Rodriguez 11; Asts: Viguer 9		Pts: Livingston Jr 16; Rebs: Acunzo 9 Asts: Livingston Jr 6

Nea Alikarnassos Arena
Attendance: 70
Referees: Josip Jurcevic (CRO), Blaz Zupancic (SLO), Ritvars Helmsteins (LAT)

14 August 2024
16:00

Boxscore

Latvia	41–66	France
Scoring by quarter: 13–18, 9–19, 11–19, 8–10
Pts: Aizpurs 11; Rebs: Grinvalds 8 Asts: Ozers, Cernevskis 3		Pts: Houindo 22; Rebs: Houindo 10; Asts: Courset, Towo-Nansi 3

Nea Alikarnassos Arena
Attendance: 80
Referees: Mehmet Sahin (TUR), Stylianos Simeonidis (GRE), Armin Mutapcic (GER)

14 August 2024
18:30

Boxscore

Turkey	65–75	Greece
Scoring by quarter: 16–16, 21–18, 8–20, 20–21
Pts: Alyanak 18; Rebs: Ziyaettin 13; Asts: Ziyaettin 8		Pts: Tsonis, Chatzilamprou 18; Rebs: Chatzilamprou 9 Asts: Tsonis 6

Nea Alikarnassos Arena
Attendance: 500
Referees: Michal Proc (POL), Ventsislav Velikov (BUL), Edgard Ceccarelli (FRA)

14 August 2024
21:00

Boxscore

Serbia	65–56	Israel
Scoring by quarter: 16–16, 15–15, 19–16, 15–9
Pts: Karalić 19; Rebs: Gavranović 11; Asts: Gavranović 3		Pts: Shalmon 12; Rebs: Trushkin 11; Asts: Aronov 6

Nea Alikarnassos Arena
Attendance: 50
Referees: Mehmet Karabilecen (TUR), Gintaras Vitkauskas (LTU), Gavin Williams (GBR)

=== 5th–8th place semifinals ===
16 August 2024
13:30

Boxscore

Italy	74–62	Turkey
Scoring by quarter: 19–12, 18–21, 21–19, 16–10
Pts: Cattapan 30; Rebs: Acunzo 13; Asts: Livingston Jr 3		Pts: Ziyaettin 25; Rebs: Alyanak, Kas 8 Asts: Corumlular, Ziyaettin 5

Nea Alikarnassos Arena
Attendance: 60
Referees: Zoran Mitrovski (MKD), Kirile Tvauri (GEO), Jules Gaduel (FRA)

16 August 2024
16:00

Boxscore

Latvia	72–78	Israel
Scoring by quarter: 13–18, 13–26, 17–15, 29–19
Pts: Aizpurs 31; Rebs: Grinvalds 9 Asts: Kudrjavcevs 6		Pts: Azriel 19; Rebs: Musis 10; Asts: Azriel 8

Nea Alikarnassos Arena
Attendance: 80
Referees: Ivor Matejek (CZE), Elias Anttonen (FIN), Armin Mutapcic (GER)

=== 7th place match ===
17 August 2024
18:30

Boxscore

Turkey	77–98	Latvia
Scoring by quarter: 21–21, 18–34, 19–24, 19–19
Pts: Ziyaettin 21; Rebs: Alyanak 6 Asts: Fenemen 6		Pts: Grinvalds 19; Rebs: Vilskersts 6 Asts: Kudrjavcevs 7

University of Crete Hall
Attendance: 30
Referees: Gintaras Vitkauskas (LTU), Gavin Williams (GBR), Andrea Bongiorni (ITA)

=== 5th place match ===
17 August 2024
13:30

Boxscore

Italy	86–63	Israel
Scoring by quarter: 19–16, 31–13, 21–19, 15–15
Pts: Livingston Jr 19; Rebs: Acunzo 11; Asts: Livingston Jr 8		Pts: Drori 15; Rebs: Aronov 7 Asts: Aronov 8

Nea Alikarnassos Arena
Attendance: 50
Referees: Kirile Tvauri (GEO), Armin Mutapcic (GER), Ritvars Helmsteins (LAT)

=== Championship semifinals ===
16 August 2024
18:30

Boxscore

Spain	77–71	Greece
Scoring by quarter: 15–25, 25–15, 11–16, 26–15
Pts: Viguer 20; Rebs: Zurita, Rodriguez 7 Asts: Sanchez 3		Pts: Chaidemenos 16; Rebs: Tsonis 5 Asts: Tsonis 3

Nea Alikarnassos Arena
Attendance: 1,475
Referees: Josip Jurcevic (CRO), Gintaras Vitkauskas (LTU), Blaz Zupancic (SLO)

16 August 2024
21:00

Boxscore

France	67–60	Serbia
Scoring by quarter: 19–22, 18–14, 14–11, 16–13
Pts: Houindo 15; Rebs: Letailleur 10; Asts: Towo-Nansi 5		Pts: Bjelić 18; Rebs: Gavranović 8 Asts: Bjelić 4

Nea Alikarnassos Arena
Attendance: 100
Referees: Michal Proc (POL), Ventsislav Velikov (BUL), Ritvars Helmsteins (LAT)

=== 3rd place match ===
17 August 2024
18:30

Boxscore

Greece	65–74	Serbia
Scoring by quarter: 13–23, 19–16, 12–18, 21–17
Pts: Chatzilamprou 21; Rebs: Chartonas 8 Asts: Chaidemenos 4		Pts: Danilović 24; Rebs: Bjelić 12; Asts: Bjelić 7

Nea Alikarnassos Arena
Attendance: 1,183
Referees: Michal Proc (POL), Ventsislav Velikov (BUL), Edgard Ceccarelli (FRA)

=== Final ===
17 August 2024
21:00

Boxscore

Spain	70–82	France
Scoring by quarter: 13–24, 23–21, 14–14, 20–23
Pts: Zurita 21; Rebs: Viguer 7 Asts: Marina 4		Pts: Houindo 20; Rebs: Houindo 11; Asts: Mahop, Towo-Nansi 6

Nea Alikarnassos Arena
Attendance: 400
Referees: Georgios Poursanidis (GRE), Mehmet Karabilecen (TUR), Sinisa Prpa (SRB)

== Final standings ==
Rank	Team	Record
1st place, gold medalist(s)	France	7–0
2nd place, silver medalist(s)	Spain	6–1
3rd place, bronze medalist(s)	Serbia	6–1
4	Greece	5–2
5	Italy	4–3
6	Israel	4–3
7	Latvia	4–3
8	Turkey	2–5
9	Lithuania	5–2
10	Germany	3–4
11	Finland	2–5
12	Slovenia	3–4
13	Georgia	3–4
14	Poland	1–6
15	Bulgaria	1–6
16	Croatia	0–7

Relegated to the 2025 FIBA U16 EuroBasket Division B

== Statistics and awards ==
=== Statistical leaders ===
==== Players ====
Points

Name	PPG
(Turkey) Omer Kutluay	19.0
(Serbia) Andrej Bjelić	18.4
(Latvia) Ricards Aizpurs	18.1
(Greece) Chrysostomos Chatzilamprou	17.9
(Turkey) Omer Ege Ziyaettin	17.7

Rebounds

Name	RPG
(Italy) Thomas Acunzo	10.4
(Lithuania) Ignas Stombergas	8.6
(France) Cameron Houindo	7.9
(Finland) Amani Haruna	7.7
(Serbia) Vukašin Gavranović	7.4
(Italy) Federico Cattapan	7.4

Assists

Name	APG
(Lithuania) Emilis Prekevicius	5.4
(France) Aaron Towo-Nansi	5.0
(Croatia) Roko Graso	4.9
(Georgia (country)) Mate Khatiashvili	4.7
(Italy) Randy Livingston Jr	4.7

Blocks

Name	BPG
(Lithuania) Ignas Stombergas	3.1
(France) Cameron Houindo	2.3
(Finland) Amani Haruna	2.1
(Turkey) Anil Alyanak	2.1
(Italy) Thomas Acunzo	1.9

Steals

Name	SPG
(Slovenia) Lukas Bojovic	2.7
(Bulgaria) Boyan Kyosev	2.7
(France) Aaron Towo-Nansi	2.7
(Slovenia) Igor Stjepanovic	2.3
(Bulgaria) Martin Popov	2.3
(France) Cameron Houindo	2.3
(Croatia) Patrik Dorotic	2.3

Efficiency

Name	EFFPG
(Italy) Thomas Acunzo	18.6
(Lithuania) Ignas Stombergas	17.1
(France) Cameron Houindo	16.1
(Turkey) Omer Kutluay	16.0
(Georgia (country)) Ilia Suladze	15.7
(Serbia) Andrej Bjelić	15.7
(Italy) Federico Cattapan	15.7

==== Teams ====
Points

Team	PPG
Spain	86.1
Lithuania	82.9
France	78.9
Serbia	78.9
Italy	74.9

Rebounds

Team	RPG
Spain	51.1
Lithuania	47.9
Israel	45.1
France	45.0
Germany	44.0

Assists

Team	APG
France	20.9
Spain	19.9
Lithuania	19.7
Finland	18.1
Latvia	18.1
Slovenia	18.1

Blocks

Team	BPG
Germany	6.9
Lithuania	5.3
France	5.1
Greece	4.9
Turkey	4.7

Steals

Team	SPG
France	14.4
Lithuania	11.0
Spain	11.0
Slovenia	10.9
Bulgaria	10.7

Efficiency

Team	EFFPG
Spain	101.7
France	98.7
Lithuania	93.7
Serbia	91.1
Germany	83.9

=== Awards ===
The awards were announced on 17 August 2024.

Award	Player
All-Tournament Team	(France) Cameron Houindo
All-Tournament Team	(Serbia) Andrej Bjelić
All-Tournament Team	(Greece) Chrysostomos Chatzilamprou
All-Tournament Team	(France) Louka Letailleur
All-Tournament Team	(Spain) Marcos Zurita
Most Valuable Player	(France) Cameron Houindo

== See also ==
- 2024 FIBA U16 EuroBasket Division B
