= 2026 FIBA U18 EuroBasket =

International youth basketball tournament

Tournament details
- Host country: Italy
- Cities: Trento; Rovereto
- Dates: 25 July – 2 August 2026
- Teams: 16 (from 1 confederation)
- Venues: 2 (in 2 host cities)

Final positions
- Champions: Slovenia (1st title)
- Runners-up: Italy
- Third place: France
- Fourth place: Spain

Tournament statistics
- MVP: (Slovenia) Stefan Joksimović
- Top scorer: (Slovenia) Stefan Joksimović (23.1 ppg)
- Top rebounds: (Israel) David Musis (11.0 rpg)
- Top assists: (Lithuania) Emilis Prekevičius (6.6 apg)

Official website
- www.fiba.basketball

The 2026 FIBA U18 EuroBasket was the 41st edition of the European basketball championship for men's under-18 national teams. The tournament was played in Trento and Rovereto, Italy, from 25 July to 2 August 2026.

This was also the FIBA Europe's qualifying tournament for the 2027 FIBA Under-19 Basketball World Cup in the Czech Republic. Top five teams joined the automatically qualified hosts Czech Republic.

== Participating teams ==
Team	App	Last	Streak	Best placement in the tournament	Prev
Teams maintained from the 2025 edition
Austria	5th	2025	2	Twelfth place (1968, 1986, 2025)	12th
Bulgaria	22nd	2025	2	Third place (1980, 1982)	13th
Denmark	4th	2024	1	Thirteenth place (2023)	▲1st, Div. B
Spain	41st	2025	41	Champions (1998, 2004, 2011, 2019, 2022,2025)	1st
Estonia	3rd	2008	1	Twelfth place (2007)	▲2nd, Div. B
France	36th	2025	28	Champions (1992, 2000, 2006, 2016)	2nd
Germany	32nd	2025	10	Champions (2024)	7th
Greece	37th	2025	31	Champions (2008, 2015)	11th
Italy	40th	2025	21	Champions (1990)	3rd
Latvia	22nd	2025	3	Runners-up (2018)	4th
Lithuania	26th	2025	26	Champions (1994, 2010)	9th
Israel	24th	2025	5	Fourth place (2024)	10th
Serbia	37th	2025	21	Champions (1972, 1974, 1976, 1986, 1988, 2005, 2007, 2009, 2017, 2018, 2023)	5th
Slovakia	2nd	2017	1	Fifteenth place (2017)	▲3rd, Div. B
Slovenia	20th	2025	6	Runners-up (2002)	6th
Turkey	35th	2025	22	Champions (2013, 2014)	8th

== First round ==
The draw of the first round was held on 5 February 2026 in Freising, Germany.

In the first round, the teams were drawn into four groups of four. All teams advanced to the playoffs.

All times are local (Central European Summer Time; UTC+2).

=== Group A ===
Pos	Team	Pld	W	L	PF	PA	PD	Pts
1	Israel	3	3	0	268	241	+27	6
2	France	3	2	1	219	206	+13	5
3	Greece	3	1	2	230	212	+18	4
4	Austria	3	0	3	183	241	−58	3

Source: FIBA

25 July 2026
13:00

Boxscore

Israel	93–84 (OT)	Greece
Scoring by quarter: 20–23, 23–21, 17–14, 17–19, Overtime: 16–7
Pts: Aronov 30; Rebs: Musis 19; Asts: Azriel 8		Pts: Thomakos, Chatzilamprou 16; Rebs: Thomakos, Chatzilamprou 10; Asts: Poulos 7

Palasport A. Marchetti, Rovereto
Attendance: 120
Referees: Gatis Saliņš (LAT), Branimir Galić (CRO), Kirile Tvauri (GEO)

25 July 2026
20:30

Boxscore

Austria	50–76	France
Scoring by quarter: 11–22, 10–17, 12–15, 17–22
Pts: Kapic 14; Rebs: three players 5 Asts: Kapic, Witzmann 3		Pts: des Bordes 10; Rebs: Cisse 9 Asts: Omiscar 4

Palasport A. Marchetti, Rovereto
Attendance: 100
Referees: Nemanja Ninković (SRB), Elvis Binders-Čoders (LAT), Maximilian Meiler (GER)

26 July 2026
15:30

Boxscore

Greece	81–53	Austria
Scoring by quarter: 23–19, 23–11, 21–14, 14–9
Pts: Asimenios 16; Rebs: Chartonas 10; Asts: Poulos 6		Pts: Thompson 11; Rebs: Kuranovic 8 Asts: Witzmann 3

BTS Arena, Trento
Attendance: 300
Referees: Viola Györgyi (NOR), Alfonso Olivares Iglesias (ESP), Primož Pipan (SLO)

26 July 2026
18:00

Boxscore

France	77–91	Israel
Scoring by quarter: 16–18, 23–21, 20–30, 18–22
Pts: Yimga-Moukouri 20; Rebs: Yimga-Moukouri, Hottelard 7 Asts: Letailleur 5		Pts: Aronov 31; Rebs: Musis 8 Asts: Orland 4

BTS Arena, Trento
Referees: Valerio Grigioni (ITA), Rainis Värv (EST), Skirmantas Letukas (DEN)

27 July 2026
13:00

Boxscore

Israel	84–80	Austria
Scoring by quarter: 22–23, 19–14, 21–17, 22–26
Pts: Musis 21; Rebs: Musis 9 Asts: Azriel 4		Pts: Thompson 21; Rebs: Kapic 14; Asts: Chavez 8

Palasport A. Marchetti, Rovereto
Attendance: 150
Referees: Marek Kukelcik (SVK), Hrvoje Čavar (BIH), Maximilian Meiler (GER)

27 July 2026
13:00

Boxscore

France	66–65	Greece
Scoring by quarter: 15–25, 23–15, 12–19, 16–6
Pts: Yimga-Moukouri 18; Rebs: Letailleur 8 Asts: three players 3		Pts: Chatzilamprou 23; Rebs: Bilionis 13; Asts: Poulos 5

BTS Arena, Trento
Attendance: 100
Referees: Julio Anaya (PAN), Elvis Binders-Čoders (LAT), Vladimir Zanev (BUL)

=== Group B ===
Pos	Team	Pld	W	L	PF	PA	PD	Pts
1	Turkey	3	3	0	238	178	+60	6
2	Serbia	3	2	1	221	193	+28	5
3	Slovakia	3	1	2	220	269	−49	4
4	Denmark	3	0	3	210	249	−39	3

Source: FIBA

25 July 2026
13:00

Boxscore

Slovakia	70–94	Serbia
Scoring by quarter: 15–14, 23–19, 18–32, 14–29
Pts: Rybár 15; Rebs: Randuska 8 Asts: Rybár 3		Pts: Gnjato 15; Rebs: Bikić, Gnjato 5 Asts: Bjelic, Karalić 4

BTS Arena, Trento
Referees: Valerio Grigioni (ITA), Alfonso Olivares Iglesias (ESP), Primož Pipan (SLO)

25 July 2026
15:30

Boxscore

Turkey	88–62	Denmark
Scoring by quarter: 18–15, 21–13, 29–18, 20–16
Pts: Koyun 24; Rebs: Karutasu 10; Asts: Yildiz 7		Pts: Bomholt, Drejer 12; Rebs: Skaaning, Drejer 5 Asts: Skaaning 3

BTS Arena, Trento
Referees: Viola Györgyi (NOR), Andrea Bongiorni (ITA), Karol Kowalski (FIN)

26 July 2026
13:00

Boxscore

Denmark	82–87 (OT)	Slovakia
Scoring by quarter: 33–13, 24–21, 12–29, 8–14, Overtime: 5–10
Pts: Uagboe 17; Rebs: Drejer 13; Asts: Drejer 5		Pts: Randuska 36; Rebs: Kubala 15; Asts: Rybár 5

Palasport A. Marchetti, Rovereto
Attendance: 150
Referees: Ioannis Agrafiotis (GRE), Vladimir Zanev (BUL), Harel Kidron (ISR)

26 July 2026
20:30

Boxscore

Serbia	53–57	Turkey
Scoring by quarter: 10–22, 10–11, 10–11, 23–13
Pts: Danilović 11; Rebs: Bikić 8 Asts: three players 3		Pts: Karutasu 21; Rebs: Karutasu 16; Asts: Fenemen 3

Palasport A. Marchetti, Rovereto
Attendance: 1,426
Referees: Gvidas Gedvilas (LTU), Elvis Binders-Čoders (LAT), Kirile Tvauri (GEO)

27 July 2026
15:30

Boxscore

Turkey	93–63	Slovakia
Scoring by quarter: 25–9, 26–8, 23–23, 19–23
Pts: Pınar 17; Rebs: Alyanak 8 Asts: three players 5		Pts: Kubala 11; Rebs: Kubala 8 Asts: Ivanko, Gregor 3

BTS Arena, Trento
Attendance: 90
Referees: Rainis Värv (EST), Alfonso Olivares Iglesias (ESP), Andrea Bongiorni (ITA)

27 July 2026
20:30

Boxscore

Serbia	74–66	Denmark
Scoring by quarter: 15–18, 18–19, 24–12, 17–17
Pts: Danilović, Susic 11; Rebs: Bikić 9 Asts: three players 3		Pts: Troels-Smith 17; Rebs: Uagboe 10; Asts: Uagboe 5

Palasport A. Marchetti, Rovereto
Attendance: 100
Referees: Gatis Saliņš (LAT), Valerio Grigioni (ITA), Hrvoje Čavar (BIH)

=== Group C ===
Pos	Team	Pld	W	L	PF	PA	PD	Pts
1	Germany	3	3	0	288	215	+73	6
2	Slovenia	3	2	1	259	240	+19	5
3	Lithuania	3	1	2	235	238	−3	4
4	Bulgaria	3	0	3	193	282	−89	3

Source: FIBA

25 July 2026
15:30

Boxscore

Bulgaria	58–104	Germany
Scoring by quarter: 20–23, 23–26, 3–26, 12–29
Pts: Zanov 15; Rebs: Zanov 7 Asts: Popov 7		Pts: Ilic 18; Rebs: Kröger 11; Asts: Anderson, Ilic 6

Palasport A. Marchetti, Rovereto
Attendance: 90
Referees: Ioannis Agrafiotis (GRE), Marek Kukelcik (SVK), Harel Kidron (ISR)

25 July 2026
18:00

Boxscore

Slovenia	83–76	Lithuania
Scoring by quarter: 18–16, 27–13, 16–28, 22–19
Pts: Joksimović 22; Rebs: Joksimović 7 Asts: Joksimović, Cizej 4		Pts: Štombergas 27; Rebs: Jakštonis 10; Asts: Prekevičius 7

Palasport A. Marchetti, Rovereto
Attendance: 150
Referees: Julio Anaya (PAN), Rainis Värv (EST), Hrvoje Čavar (BIH)

26 July 2026
13:00

Boxscore

Germany	98–88	Slovenia
Scoring by quarter: 26–17, 19–25, 25–19, 28–27
Pts: Kayser 25; Rebs: Kemmer, Kayser 10; Asts: Anderson, Kayser 6		Pts: Joksimović 28; Rebs: Ciperle 7 Asts: Ciperle, Stjepanović 3

BTS Arena, Trento
Attendance: 300
Referees: Gatis Saliņš (LAT), Andrea Bongiorni (ITA), Aleksandar Radonjic (AUT)

26 July 2026
20:30

Boxscore

Lithuania	90–69	Bulgaria
Scoring by quarter: 23–17, 21–8, 23–19, 23–25
Pts: Černeckis 15; Rebs: Štombergas, Aliukonis 8 Asts: Prekevicius 5		Pts: Kolev 29; Rebs: Zanov, Kolev 5 Asts: Castanier 5

BTS Arena, Trento
Attendance: 1,426
Referees: Çisil Güngör (TUR), Edgard Ceccarelli (FRA), Andrea Bongiorni (ITA)

27 July 2026
15:30

Boxscore

Slovenia	88–66	Bulgaria
Scoring by quarter: 22–16, 26–12, 27–19, 13–19
Pts: Čop 19; Rebs: Čop 6 Asts: Joksimović 5		Pts: Zanov 18; Rebs: Zanov 17; Asts: Popov 5

Palasport A. Marchetti, Rovereto
Attendance: 150
Referees: Nemanja Ninkovic (SRB), Kirile Tvauri (GEO), Skirmantas Letukas (DEN)

27 July 2026
18:00

Boxscore

Germany	86–69	Lithuania
Scoring by quarter: 16–24, 24–17, 23–13, 23–15
Pts: Anderson 24; Rebs: Kiehlneker 7 Asts: Ilic 6		Pts: Zibuda 14; Rebs: Jakštonis 10; Asts: Prekevicius 6

Palasport A. Marchetti, Rovereto
Attendance: 150
Referees: Ioannis Agrafiotis (GRE), Branimir Galić (CRO), Harel Kidron (ISR)

=== Group D ===
Pos	Team	Pld	W	L	PF	PA	PD	Pts
1	Spain	3	3	0	247	209	+38	6
2	Italy (H)	3	2	1	234	204	+30	5
3	Latvia	3	1	2	218	239	−21	4
4	Estonia	3	0	3	188	235	−47	3

Source: FIBA
(H) Hosts

25 July 2026
18:00

Boxscore

Italy	89–67	Latvia
Scoring by quarter: 23–16, 22–21, 17–17, 27–13
Pts: Acunzo 13; Rebs: Abreu 10; Asts: Cattapan, Di Meo 3		Pts: Čerņevskis 22; Rebs: Rotcenkovs 7 Asts: Mūrnieks 5

BTS Arena, Trento
Referees: Gvidas Gedvilas (LTU), Vladimir Zanev (BUL), Skirmantas Letukas (DEN)

25 July 2026
20:30

Boxscore

Estonia	61–87	Spain
Scoring by quarter: 19–20, 11–15, 18–26, 13–26
Pts: Vuks 14; Rebs: Avdejev 13; Asts: Vuks 3		Pts: Fernández 19; Rebs: Diallo 11; Asts: Alonso 6

BTS Arena, Trento
Referees: Edgard Ceccarelli (FRA), Çisil Güngör (TUR), Aleksandar Radonjic (AUT)

26 July 2026
15:30

Boxscore

Latvia	64–58	Estonia
Scoring by quarter: 13–13, 17–15, 13–15, 21–15
Pts: Rotcenkovs 11; Rebs: Rotcenkovs 6 Asts: Kudrjavcevs 5		Pts: Adamson 21; Rebs: Avdejev 11; Asts: Põder, Vuks 2

Palasport A. Marchetti, Rovereto
Attendance: 865
Referees: Nemanja Ninkovic (SRB), Marek Kukelcik (SVK), Maximilian Meiler (GER)

26 July 2026
18:00

Boxscore

Spain	68–61	Italy
Scoring by quarter: 13–18, 23–8, 17–20, 15–15
Pts: Fernández 17; Rebs: Alonso, Diallo 10; Asts: Alonso 7		Pts: Bottelli 13; Rebs: Acunzo 7 Asts: Niang 6

Palasport A. Marchetti, Rovereto
Attendance: 1,389
Referees: Julio Anaya (PAN), Branimir Galić (CRO), Hrvoje Čavar (BIH)

27 July 2026
18:00

Boxscore

Italy	84–69	Estonia
Scoring by quarter: 21–17, 19–18, 19–18, 25–16
Pts: Niang 15; Rebs: Acunzo, Abreu 10; Asts: Livingston 4		Pts: Pertel 19; Rebs: Avdejev 11; Asts: Vuks 3

BTS Arena, Trento
Attendance: 300
Referees: Gvidas Gedvilas (LTU), Çisil Güngör (TUR), Aleksandar Radonjić (AUT)

27 July 2026
20:30

Boxscore

Spain	92–87	Latvia
Scoring by quarter: 25–29, 26–17, 19–29, 22–12
Pts: Niebla 19; Rebs: Niebla 8 Asts: Alonso 5		Pts: Aleksandrovs 19; Rebs: Čerņevskis 5 Asts: Aleksandrovs 8

BTS Arena, Trento
Attendance: 300
Referees: Edgard Ceccarelli (FRA), Viola Györgyi (NOR), Primož Pipan (SLO)

== Final round ==
=== Main bracket ===
Round of 16
29 July
A1 Israel	100
B4 Denmark	86
29 July
C2 Slovenia	86
D3 Latvia	76
29 July
B2 Serbia	77
A3 Greece	78
29 July
D1 Spain	99
C4 Bulgaria	66
29 July
A2 France	72
B3 Slovakia	60
29 July
C1 Germany	85
D4 Estonia	71
29 July
B1 Turkey	90
A4 Austria	64
29 July
D2 Italy	83
C3 Lithuania	71

Quarterfinals
30 July
A1 Israel	87
C2 Slovenia	95
30 July
A3 Greece	66
D1 Spain	69
30 July
A2 France	76
C1 Germany	61
30 July
B1 Turkey	59
D2 Italy	76

Semifinals
1 August
C2 Slovenia	90
D1 Spain	71
1 August
A2 France	77
D2 Italy	80

Final
2 August
C2 Slovenia	88
D2 Italy	71
3rd place match
2 August
D1 Spain	69
A2 France	74

=== Round of 16 ===
29 July 2026
13:00

Boxscore

Israel	100–86	Denmark
Scoring by quarter: 26–20, 24–20, 28–16, 22–30

Palasport A. Marchetti, Rovereto
Attendance: 150

29 July 2026
13:00

Boxscore

France	72–60	Slovakia
Scoring by quarter: 14–13, 23–15, 13–18, 22–14

BTS Arena, Trento
Attendance: 150

29 July 2026
15:30

Boxscore

Germany	85–71	Estonia
Scoring by quarter: 21–18, 19–15, 27–16, 18–22

BTS Arena, Trento
Attendance: 150

29 July 2026
15:30

Boxscore

Slovenia	86–76	Latvia
Scoring by quarter: 23–15, 22–22, 14–28, 27–11

Palasport A. Marchetti, Rovereto
Attendance: 150

29 July 2026
18:00

Boxscore

Serbia	77–78	Greece
Scoring by quarter: 22–13, 16–17, 22–28, 17–20

Palasport A. Marchetti, Rovereto

29 July 2026
18:00

Boxscore

Italy	83–71	Lithuania
Scoring by quarter: 30–20, 17–20, 15–16, 21–15

BTS Arena, Trento
Attendance: 300

29 July 2026
20:30

Boxscore

Turkey	90–64	Austria
Scoring by quarter: 21–17, 22–13, 22–13, 25–21

BTS Arena, Trento
Attendance: 300

29 July 2026
20:30

Boxscore

Spain	99–66	Bulgaria
Scoring by quarter: 23–18, 26–15, 22–20, 28–13

Palasport A. Marchetti, Rovereto
Attendance: 120

=== 9–16th classification playoffs ===
9–16th place quarterfinals
30 July
B4 Denmark	68
D3 Latvia	65
30 July
B2 Serbia	89
C4 Bulgaria	62
30 July
B3 Slovakia	66
D4 Estonia	97
30 July
A4 Austria	68
C3 Lithuania	84

9–12th place semifinals
1 August
B4 Denmark	54
B2 Serbia	70
1 August
D4 Estonia	80
C3 Lithuania	69

Ninth place match
2 August
B2 Serbia	77
D4 Estonia	67
Eleventh place match
2 August
B4 Denmark	83
C3 Lithuania	91

13–16th place semifinals
1 August
D3 Latvia	87
C4 Bulgaria	81
1 August
B3 Slovakia	61
A4 Austria	75

13th place match
2 August
D3 Latvia	71
A4 Austria	73
15th place match
2 August
C4 Bulgaria	72
B3 Slovakia	74

==== 9–16th place quarterfinals ====
30 July 2026
13:00

Boxscore

Denmark	68–65	Latvia
Scoring by quarter: 20–13, 14–14, 14–18, 20–20

Palasport A. Marchetti, Rovereto
Attendance: 100

30 July 2026
15:30

Boxscore

Serbia	89–62	Bulgaria
Scoring by quarter: 27–20, 14–15, 30–6, 18–21

Palasport A. Marchetti, Rovereto
Attendance: 50

30 July 2026
18:00

Boxscore

Slovakia	66–97	Estonia
Scoring by quarter: 8–20, 24–30, 17–25, 17–22

Palasport A. Marchetti, Rovereto
Attendance: 50

30 July 2026
20:30

Boxscore

Austria	68–84	Lithuania
Scoring by quarter: 7–19, 20–24, 22–19, 19–22

Palasport A. Marchetti, Rovereto
Attendance: 80

==== 13–16th place semifinals ====
1 August 2026
13:00

Boxscore

Latvia	87–81	Bulgaria
Scoring by quarter: 22–25, 23–15, 25–21, 17–20

Palasport A. Marchetti, Rovereto
Attendance: 150

1 August 2026
15:30

Boxscore

Slovakia	61–75	Austria
Scoring by quarter: 11–20, 20–23, 16–10, 14–22

Palasport A. Marchetti, Rovereto
Attendance: 150

==== 15th place match ====
2 August 2026
10:30

Boxscore

Bulgaria	72–74	Slovakia
Scoring by quarter: 20–14, 17–22, 17–21, 18–17

Palasport A. Marchetti, Rovereto
Attendance: 16

==== 13th place match ====
2 August 2026
13:00

Boxscore

Latvia	71–73	Austria
Scoring by quarter: 18–14, 22–17, 13–17, 18–25

BTS Arena, Trento
Attendance: 100

==== 9–12th place semifinals ====
1 August 2026
18:00

Boxscore

Denmark	54–70	Serbia
Scoring by quarter: 11–16, 11–19, 16–21, 16–14

Palasport A. Marchetti, Rovereto
Attendance: 100

1 August 2026
20:30

Boxscore

Estonia	80–69	Lithuania
Scoring by quarter: 24−22, 11−15, 23−17, 22−15

Palasport A. Marchetti, Rovereto
Attendance: 50

==== Eleventh place match ====
2 August 2026
15:30

Boxscore

Denmark	83–91	Lithuania
Scoring by quarter: 19–19, 11–32, 32–18, 21–22

Palasport A. Marchetti, Rovereto
Attendance: 150

==== Ninth place match ====
2 August 2026
18:00

Boxscore

Serbia	77–67	Estonia
Scoring by quarter: 12–23, 20–15, 19–15, 26–14

Palasport A. Marchetti, Rovereto
Attendance: 150

=== Quarterfinals ===
30 July 2026
13:00

Boxscore

Israel	87–95	Slovenia
Scoring by quarter: 23–21, 21–28, 23–20, 20–26

BTS Arena, Trento
Attendance: 200

30 July 2026
15:30

Boxscore

Greece	66–69	Spain
Scoring by quarter: 29–13, 19–13, 11–17, 7–26

BTS Arena, Trento
Attendance: 200

30 July 2026
20:30

Boxscore

France	76–61	Germany
Scoring by quarter: 12–16, 25–10, 17–17, 22–18

BTS Arena, Trento
Attendance: 300

30 July 2026
18:00

Boxscore

Turkey	59–76	Italy
Scoring by quarter: 8–27, 17–16, 15–19, 19–14

BTS Arena, Trento
Attendance: 300

=== 5–8th classification playoffs ===
5–8th place semifinals
1 August
A1 Israel	64
A3 Greece	84
1 August
C1 Germany	74
B1 Turkey	69

Fifth place match
2 August
A3 Greece	69
C1 Germany	99
Seventh place match
2 August
A1 Israel	85
B1 Turkey	79

==== 5–8th place semifinals ====
1 August 2026
13:00

Boxscore

Israel	64–84	Greece
Scoring by quarter: 21–15, 12–22, 15–21, 16–26

BTS Arena, Trento

1 August 2026
15:30

Boxscore

Germany	74–69	Turkey
Scoring by quarter: 19–18, 12–19, 27–20, 16–12

BTS Arena, Trento
Attendance: 150

==== Seventh place match ====
2 August 2026
13:00

Boxscore

Israel	85–79	Turkey
Scoring by quarter: 20–14, 15–26, 21–25, 29–14

Palasport A. Marchetti, Rovereto
Attendance: 50

==== Fifth place match ====
2 August 2026
15:30

Boxscore

Greece	69–99	Germany
Scoring by quarter: 20–19, 15–26, 16–30, 18–24

BTS Arena, Trento
Attendance: 100

=== Semifinals ===
1 August 2026
20:30

Boxscore

Slovenia	90–71	Spain
Scoring by quarter: 17−16, 24−28, 17−11, 32−16

BTS Arena, Trento
Attendance: 450

1 August 2026
18:00

Boxscore

France	77–80 (OT)	Italy
Scoring by quarter: 18–16, 12–16, 23–14, 11–18, Overtime: 13–16

BTS Arena, Trento
Attendance: 1,450

=== Third place match ===
2 August 2026
17:15

Boxscore

Spain	69–74	France
Scoring by quarter: 16–27, 18–16, 17–14, 18–17

BTS Arena, Trento
Attendance: 400

=== Final ===
2 August 2026
20:15

Boxscore

Slovenia	88–71	Italy
Scoring by quarter: 27−15, 23−22, 25−20, 18−19

BTS Arena, Trento

== Final standings ==
Rank	Team	Record
1st place, gold medalist(s)	Slovenia	6–1
2nd place, silver medalist(s)	Italy	5–2
3rd place, bronze medalist(s)	France	5–2
4th	Spain	5–2
5th	Germany	6–1
6th	Greece	3–4
7th	Israel	5–2
8th	Turkey	4–3
9th	Serbia	5–2
10th	Estonia	2–5
11th	Lithuania	3–4
12th	Denmark	1–6
13th	Austria	2–5
14th	Latvia	2–5
15th	Slovakia	2–5
16th	Bulgaria	0–7

Qualified for the 2027 FIBA Under-19 Basketball World Cup
Relegated to the 2027 FIBA U18 EuroBasket Division B
