= Charis Bilionis =

Greek basketball player

Charalampos Bilionis
No. 77 – AEK Athens
- Position: Center / power forward
- League: Greek Basket League

Personal information
- Born: 20 July 2008 (age 18) Thessaloniki, Greece
- Listed height: 6 ft 8 in (2.03 m)

Career information
- Playing career: 2024–present

Career history
- 2024–2025: Iraklis Thessaloniki
- 2025–present: AEK Athens

Charalampos Bilionis (born 20 July 2008), commonly known as Charis Bilionis, is a Greek basketball player who plays as a center and power forward for AEK B.C. and the Greek under-18 national team.

== Early life and youth career ==
Bilionis began playing basketball at the PAOK Academy. He subsequently joined Aris, with whom he won silver medals in the EKASTH championships at under-15 and under-16 level.

== Professional career ==
At the age of 16, Bilionis joined the senior men's team of Iraklis. During the 2024–25 Elite League season, he made his senior debut for the club. Iraklis achieved promotion to the Greek Basket League at the end of the 2024–25 season. Bilionis was part of the club during its promotion campaign.

On 27 August 2025, Blionis joined AEK Athens of the Greek Basket League.

== International career ==
Bilionis represented Greece at youth level before being selected for the Greek under-18 national team. He was included in Greece's squad for the 2026 FIBA U18 EuroBasket.
