= Hugo Yimga-Moukouri =

French basketball player

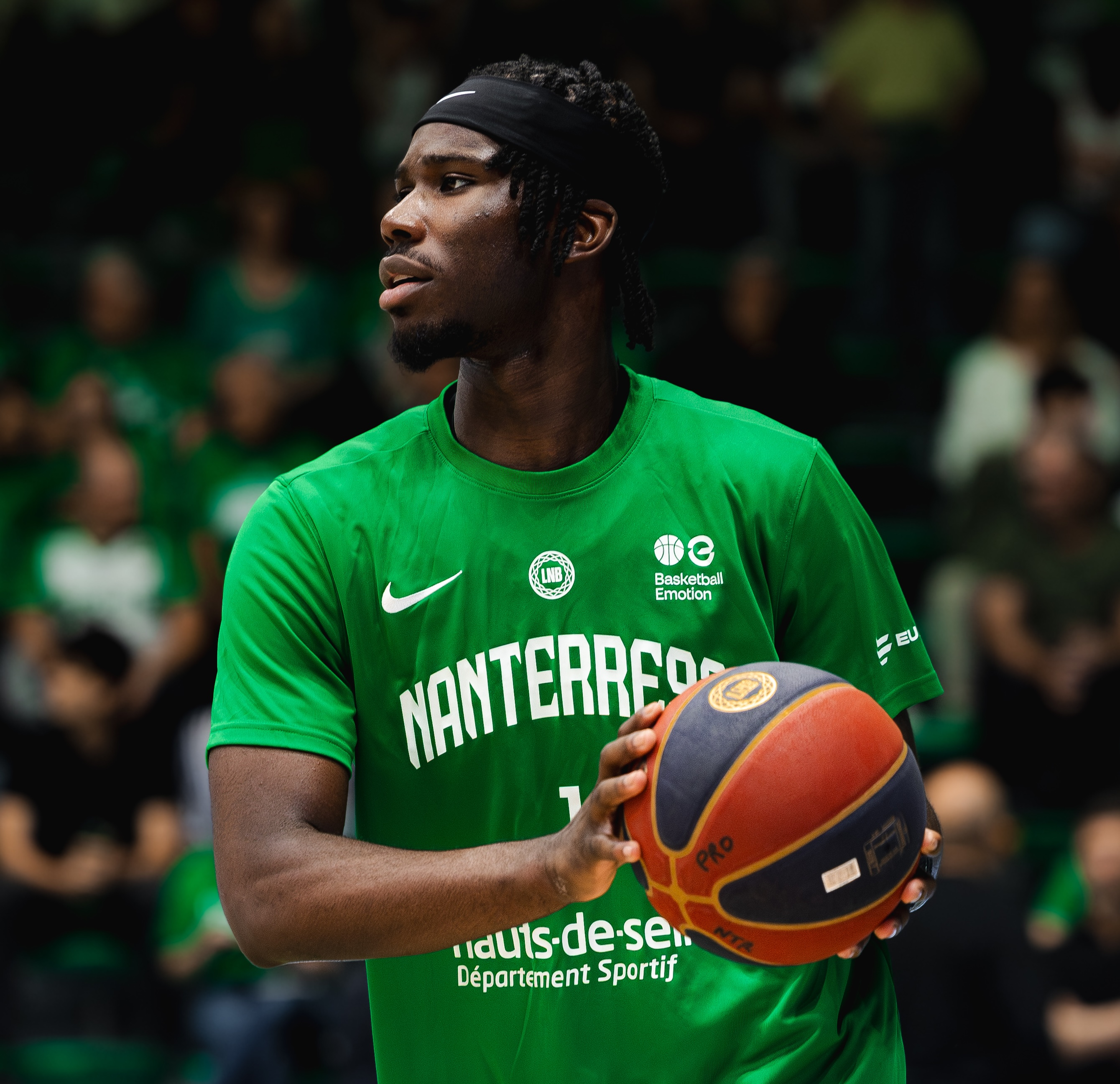
- Hugo Yimga-Moukouri in October 2025

No. 1 – Nanterre 92
- Position: Small forward
- League: LNB Élite; Champions League

Personal information
- Born: 3 July 2008 (age 18) Colombes, Hauts-de-Seine, France
- Listed height: 6 ft 9 in (2.06 m)
- Listed weight: 230 lb (104 kg)

Career information
- Playing career: 2025–present

Career history
- 2025–present: Nanterre 92
Medals
Men's basketball
Representing France
FIBA U18 EuroBasket
Bronze medal – third place	2026 Italy	Team

Hugo Yimga-Moukouri (/uːˈɡoʊjiːmɡəmuːˈkuːri/ OO-goh-YEEM-guh-moo-KOO-ree; born 3 July 2008) is a French professional basketball player who plays for Nanterre 92 of the LNB Pro A and the Champions League. He is considered one of the most promising young talents in French basketball.

== Biography ==
=== Junior career and development ===
Originally from Colombes, Hugo Yimga-Moukouri began playing basketball in Asnières-sur-Seine. He recalls his early experience in basketball: "I scored my first basket and felt a joy I can't even explain". Yimga-Moukouri joined Courbevoie Sport Basket before moving to the youth teams of Nanterre 92. He later joined the training center of the CFBB / Pôle France in 2022.

=== Club career ===
In the 2025–26 season, at age 16, he joined professional club Nanterre 92 to play in Betclic Elite. During his official presentation, Nanterre coach Julien Mahé said this about Yimga-Moukouri:

"I am very excited to work with a player with such high potential. We will work very hard with him to give him the best opportunities for individual development."

=== International career ===
Hugo Yimga-Moukouri has represented France in youth national teams:

- 2023: U16 European Championship
- 2024: U17 World Cup
- 2025: U18 European Championship

=== Playing style ===
An athletic 6'9 small forward, Hugo Yimga-Moukouri is known for his offensive versatility, ability to score near the basket or mid-range, and defensive mobility that allows him to guard multiple positions.

=== Honors and awards ===
Hugo won the bronze medal at the U16 European Championship (2023) and he won the silver medal at the U18 European Championship (2025)
