= Vasilis Chartonas =

Greek basketball player

No. 17 – AEK Athens
- Position: Small forward / shooting guard
- League: GBL; BCL

Personal information
- Born: May 21, 2008 (age 18) Thessaloniki, Greece
- Listed height: 6 ft 5 in (1.96 m)
- Listed weight: 194 lb (88 kg)

Career information
- Playing career: 2026–present

Career history
- 2026–present: AEK Athens

Vasilis Chartonas (alternate spelling: Vasileios) (Greek: Βασιλης Χαρτώνας; born May 21, 2008) is a Greek professional basketball player for AEK Athens of the Greek Basketball League (GBL) and the Basketball Champions League (BCL). He is a 1.95 m (6 ft 4 3/4 in) tall Shooting guard.

== Professional career ==
Chartonas began playing basketball with 10 Academy. He began his pro career with the senior men's team of AEK Athens in 2026, signing a 5-year contract with the club. On September 3, he made his debut with the club, scoring 3 points in a match against Maroussi.

== International career ==
Chartonas represented Greece at youth level before being selected for the Greek under-18 national team. He was included in Greece's squad for the 2026 FIBA U18 EuroBasket.
